= 1994 Minnesota Vikings season =

NFL team season

- Head coach: Dennis Green
- Offensive coordinator: Brian Billick
- Defensive coordinator: Tony Dungy
- Home stadium: Hubert H. Humphrey Metrodome

Results
- Record: 10–6
- Division place: 1st NFC Central
- Playoffs: Lost Wild Card Playoffs (vs. Bears) 18–35
- All-Pros: WR Cris Carter (1st team); G Randall McDaniel (1st team); DT John Randle (1st team); K Fuad Reveiz (2nd team)
- Pro Bowlers: WR Cris Carter; LB Jack Del Rio; G Randall McDaniel; QB Warren Moon; DT John Randle; K Fuad Reveiz

Uniform
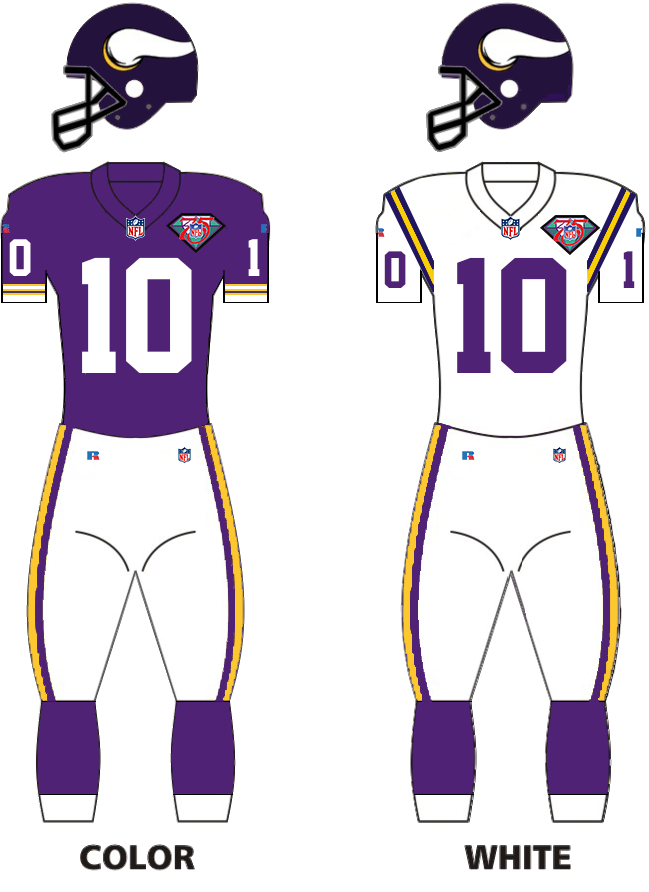

The 1994 season was the Minnesota Vikings' 34th in the National Football League (NFL) and their third under head coach Dennis Green. The team finished with a 10–6 record and reached the playoffs for a third straight season, but also failed to make it out of the wild-card round for the third year in a row, losing 35–18 to their division rival Chicago Bears.

== Offseason ==
| Additions | Subtractions |
|---|---|
| QB Warren Moon (Oilers) | WR Anthony Carter (Lions) |
| RB Amp Lee (49ers) | DE Chris Doleman (Falcons) |
| T Chris Hinton (Falcons) | LB Fred Strickland (Packers) |
| | QB Jim McMahon (Cardinals) |
| | RB Barry Word (Cardinals) |
| | DT Brad Culpepper (Buccaneers) |

=== 1994 draft ===
| Pro Bowler |

1994 Minnesota Vikings Draft
| Draft order | | Player name | Position | College | Notes |
| Round | Selection | Player name | Position | College | Notes |
|---|---|---|---|---|---|
| 1 | 18 | Dewayne Washington | Cornerback | NC State | From Broncos (Note: The Vikings traded OT Gary Zimmerman to the Broncos in exchange for first- and sixth-round selections (18th and 179th overall) and a 1995 second-round selection (42nd overall).) |
| 1 | 19 | Todd Steussie | Offensive tackle | California | |
| 2 | 40 | David Palmer | Wide receiver | Alabama | From Browns, via Eagles and Falcons (Note: The Vikings traded DE Chris Doleman and a second-round selection (45th overall) to the Falcons in exchange for a second-round selection (40th overall) and a 1995 first-round selection (11th overall).) |
| 2 | 45 | Traded to the Atlanta Falcons | | | Compensatory pick |
| 2 | 52 | Traded to the Los Angeles Raiders (Note: The Vikings traded their second-round selection (52nd overall) to the Raiders in exchange for second- and fourth-round selections (55th and 125th overall).) | | | |
| 2 | 55 | Fernando Smith | Defensive end | Jackson State | From Raiders |
| 3 | 88 | Traded to the Pittsburgh Steelers (Note: The Vikings traded their third- and sixth-round selections (88th and 180th overall) to the Steelers in exchange for TE Adrian Cooper.) | | | |
| 4 | 119 | Traded to the Houston Oilers (Note: The Vikings traded their fourth-round selection (119th overall) and a 1995 third-round selection (89th overall) to the Oilers in exchange for QB Warren Moon.) | | | |
| 4 | 125 | Mike Wells | Defensive tackle | Iowa | From Raiders |
| 5 | 134 | Shelly Hammonds | Defensive back | Penn State | From Redskins (Note: The Vikings traded QB Rich Gannon to the Redskins in exchange for a conditional fifth-round selection (134th overall).) |
| 5 | 151 | Traded to the Kansas City Chiefs (Note: The Vikings traded their fifth-round selection (151st overall) to the Chiefs in exchange for RB Barry Word.) | | | |
| 6 | 179 | Andrew Jordan | Tight end | Western Carolina | From Broncos |
| 6 | 180 | Traded to the Pittsburgh Steelers | | | |
| 7 | 211 | Pete Bercich | Linebacker | Notre Dame | |

=== Undrafted free agents ===
1994 undrafted free agents of note
| Player | Position | College |
|---|---|---|
| Malik Boyd | Cornerback | Southern |
| Phil Brown | Running back | Texas |
| Edward Buck | Safety | Texas |
| Tony Carter | Fullback | Minnesota |
| Lance Gray | Fullback | Nebraska |
| Robert Griffith | Safety | San Diego State |
| Troy Riemer | Tackle | Texas |

== Staff ==
1994 Minnesota Vikings staff
| Front office: Chairman of the board – John Skoglund; President/chief executive officer – Roger Headrick; Head coaches: Head coach – Dennis Green; Offensive coaches: Offensive coordinator/quarterbacks – Brian Billick; Running backs – Tyrone Willingham; Receivers – Jerry Rhome; Offensive line – Keith Rowen; Assistant offensive line – Chris Foerster; Offensive assistant – Carl Hargrave | Defensive coaches: Defensive coordinator – Tony Dungy; Defensive line – John Teerlinck; Inside linebackers – Monte Kiffin; Outside linebackers – Trent Walters; Defensive backs – Richard Solomon; Special teams coaches: Special teams – Gary Zauner; Strength and conditioning: Strength and conditioning – Steve Wetzel; Strength and conditioning assistant – Mike Wolf |

== Roster ==
1994 Minnesota Vikings roster
| Quarterbacks (QB): 14 Brad Johnson; 1 Warren Moon; 12 Sean Salisbury; Running backs (RB): 21 Terry Allen; 29 Chuck Evans FB; 31 Scottie Graham; 32 Amp Lee; 26 Robert Smith KR; Wide receivers (WR): 80 Cris Carter; 84 Eric Guliford; 82 Qadry Ismail KR; 22 David Palmer PR; 86 Jake Reed; 81 Chris Walsh; Tight ends (TE): 46 John Gerak; 89 Andrew Jordan; 83 Steve Jordan | Offensive linemen (OL): 62 Jeff Christy C; 75 Bernard Dafney G; 71 David Dixon G; 78 Chris Hinton T; 64 Randall McDaniel G; 60 Reggie McElroy G/T; 63 Mike Ruether C; 73 Todd Steussie T; Defensive linemen (DL): 92 Roy Barker DE; 99 James Harris DE; 90 Robert Harris DE; 91 Martin Harrison DE; 79 Roosevelt Nix DE; 93 John Randle DT; 95 Fernando Smith DE; 97 Henry Thomas DT; 98 Esera Tuaolo DT | Linebackers (LB): 50 Bobby Abrams OLB; 52 Richard Brown MLB; 55 Jack Del Rio MLB; 54 Dave Garnett OLB; 51 Carlos Jenkins OLB; 58 Ed McDaniel OLB; 59 Ashley Sheppard OLB; 57 William Sims MLB; Defensive backs (DB): 36 Malik Boyd CB; 34 Brian Davis CB; 25 Vencie Glenn FS; 24 Robert Griffith FS; 37 Lamar McGriggs SS; 27 Anthony Parker CB; 38 Todd Scott SS; 20 Dewayne Washington CB; Special teams (ST): 68 Mike Morris LS; 7 Fuad Reveiz K; 4 Mike Saxon P | Practice squad: 56 Pete Bercich LB; -- Shelly Hammonds CB/S; -- Royce Nelson G; -- Robert Staten FB; Reserve: -- Frank Boudreaux DT (PUP); 87 Adrian Cooper TE (IR); -- Donald Jones LB (IR); 61 Everett Lindsay G (IR); 85 Brent Novoselsky TE (IR); Rookies in italics 53 active, 5 reserve, 4 practice squad |

== Preseason ==
| Week | Date | Opponent | Result | Record | Venue | Attendance | Notes |
|---|---|---|---|---|---|---|---|
| 1 | July 31 | at Dallas Cowboys | L 9–17 | 0–1 | Texas Stadium | 59,062 | |
| 2 | August 7 | Kansas City Chiefs | W 17–9 | 1–1 | Tokyo Dome (Tokyo, Japan) | 49,555 | American Bowl |
| 3 | August 13 | New Orleans Saints | W 21–17 | 2–1 | Metrodome | 46,067 | |
| 4 | August 20 | at Seattle Seahawks | L 19–30 | 2–2 | Husky Stadium | 45,797 | |
| 5 | August 26 | Miami Dolphins | W 31–16 | 3–2 | Metrodome | 46,933 | |

== Regular season ==
=== Schedule ===
| Week | Date | Opponent | Result | Record | Venue | Attendance |
|---|---|---|---|---|---|---|
| 1 | September 4 | at Green Bay Packers | L 16–10 | 0–1 | Lambeau Field | 59,487 |
| 2 | September 11 | Detroit Lions | W 10–3 | 1–1 | Metrodome | 57,349 |
| 3 | September 18 | at Chicago Bears | W 42–14 | 2–1 | Soldier Field | 61,073 |
| 4 | September 25 | Miami Dolphins | W 38–35 | 3–1 | Metrodome | 64,035 |
| 5 | October 2 | at Arizona Cardinals | L 17–7 | 3–2 | Sun Devil Stadium | 67,950 |
| 6 | October 10 | at New York Giants | W 27–10 | 4–2 | Giants Stadium | 77,294 |
| 7 | Bye | | | | | |
| 8 | October 20 | Green Bay Packers | W 13–10 (OT) | 5–2 | Metrodome | 63,041 |
| 9 | October 30 | at Tampa Bay Buccaneers | W 36–13 | 6–2 | Tampa Stadium | 42,110 |
| 10 | November 6 | New Orleans Saints | W 21–20 | 7–2 | Metrodome | 57,564 |
| 11 | November 13 | at New England Patriots | L 26–20 (OT) | 7–3 | Foxboro Stadium | 58,382 |
| 12 | November 20 | New York Jets | L 31–21 | 7–4 | Metrodome | 60,687 |
| 13 | November 27 | Tampa Bay Buccaneers | L 20–17 (OT) | 7–5 | Metrodome | 47,259 |
| 14 | December 1 | Chicago Bears | W 33–27 (OT) | 8–5 | Metrodome | 61,483 |
| 15 | December 11 | at Buffalo Bills | W 21–17 | 9–5 | Rich Stadium | 66,501 |
| 16 | December 17 | at Detroit Lions | L 41–19 | 9–6 | Silverdome | 73,881 |
| 17 | December 26 | San Francisco 49ers | W 21–14 | 10–6 | Hubert H. Humphrey Metrodome | 63,326 |

=== Game summaries ===
==== Week 13: vs Tampa Bay Buccaneers ====
Week 13: Tampa Bay Buccaneers at Minnesota Vikings – Game summary

| Quarter | 1 | 2 | 3 | 4 | OT | Total |
|---|---|---|---|---|---|---|
| Buccaneers | 7 | 7 | 0 | 3 | 3 | 20 |
| Vikings | 0 | 9 | 0 | 8 | 0 | 17 |

at Hubert H. Humphrey Metrodome, Minneapolis, Minnesota

- Date: November 27, 1994
- Game time: 1:00 p.m. EDT
- Game weather: None (indoor stadium)
- Game attendance: 47,250
- Referee: Red Cashion (43)
- TV: Fox
- Pro-Football-Reference.com, NFL Game Book

Game information

First quarter

- TB – Errict Rhett 1-yard run (Michael Husted kick), 11:14. Buccaneers 7–0. Drive: 3 plays, 6 yards, 1:26.

Second quarter

- MIN – Fuad Reveiz 23-yard field goal, 13:36. Buccaneers 7–3. Drive: 12 plays, 61 yards, 6:10.
- MIN – Fuad Reveiz 21-yard field goal, 8:16. Buccaneers 7–6. Drive: 9 plays, 49 yards, 2:58.
- TB – Courtney Hawkins 14-yard pass from Craig Erickson (Michael Husted kick), 5:13. Buccaneers 14–6. Drive: 8 plays, 55 yards, 3:03.
- MIN – Fuad Reveiz 51-yard field goal, 0:33. Buccaneers 14–9. Drive: 10 plays, 53 yards, 2:41.

Third quarter

- No scoring plays.

Fourth quarter

- TB – Michael Husted 27-yard field goal, 5:24. Buccaneers 17–9. Drive: 14 plays, 86 yards, 7:58.
- MIN – Qadry Ismail 40-yard pass from Warren Moon (Warren Moon–Cris Carter pass), 1:27. Tied 17–17. Drive: 3 plays, 52 yards, 0:31.

Overtime

- TB – Michael Husted 22-yard field goal, 12:52. Buccaneers 20–17. Drive: 6 plays, 58 yards, 2:08.

Top passers

- TB – Craig Erickson – 20/38, 254 yards, TD, INT
- MIN – Warren Moon – 24/46, 286 yards, TD, INT

Top rushers

- TB – Errict Rhett – 24 rushes, 55 yards, TD
- MIN – Terry Allen – 16 rushes, 54 yards

Top receivers

- TB – Courtney Hawkins – 6 receptions, 80 yards, TD
- MIN – Qadry Ismail – 6 receptions, 101 yards, TD

=== Standings ===
NFC Central
| | W | L | T | PCT | PF | PA | STK |
|---|---|---|---|---|---|---|---|
| ^{(3)} Minnesota Vikings | 10 | 6 | 0 | .625 | 356 | 314 | W1 |
| ^{(4)} Green Bay Packers | 9 | 7 | 0 | .563 | 382 | 287 | W3 |
| ^{(5)} Detroit Lions | 9 | 7 | 0 | .563 | 357 | 342 | L1 |
| ^{(6)} Chicago Bears | 9 | 7 | 0 | .563 | 271 | 307 | L1 |
| Tampa Bay Buccaneers | 6 | 10 | 0 | .375 | 251 | 351 | L1 |

== Postseason ==
=== Game summaries ===
==== NFC Wild Card Playoffs: vs. (#6) Chicago Bears ====
NFC Wild Card Playoffs: (#6) Chicago Bears at (#3) Minnesota Vikings – Game summary

| Quarter | 1 | 2 | 3 | 4 | Total |
|---|---|---|---|---|---|
| Bears | 0 | 14 | 7 | 14 | 35 |
| Vikings | 3 | 6 | 3 | 6 | 18 |

at Hubert H. Humphrey Metrodome, Minneapolis, Minnesota

- Date: January 1
- Game time: 4:00 p.m. EST/3:00 p.m. CST
- Game weather: None (indoor stadium)
- Game attendance: 60,347
- Referee: Red Cashion (43)
- TV announcers (Fox): Pat Summerall and John Madden
- Pro-Football-Reference.com, NFL Game Book

Game information

First quarter

- MIN – Fuad Reveiz 29-yard field goal, 8:01. Vikings 3–0. 4 plays, −6 yards, 1:20.

Second quarter

- CHI – Lewis Tillman 1-yard run (Kevin Butler kick), 11:46. Bears 7–3. Drive: 16 plays, 80 yards, 8:51.
- CHI – Keith Jennings 9-yard pass from Steve Walsh (Kevin Butler kick), 8:03. Bears 14–3. Drive: 4 plays, 71 yards, 2:02.
- MIN – Cris Carter 4-yard pass from Warren Moon (pass failed), 0:19. Bears 14–9. Drive: 6 plays, 47 yards, 1:26.

Third quarter

- CHI – Raymont Harris 29-yard run (Kevin Butler kick), 12:57. Bears 21–9. Drive: 4 plays, 75 yards, 2:03.
- MIN – Fuad Reveiz 48-yard field goal, 0:05. Bears 21–12. Drive: 6 plays, 37 yards, 0:54.

Fourth quarter

- CHI – Jeff Graham 21-yard pass from Steve Walsh (Kevin Butler kick), 12:42. Bears 28–12. Drive: 6 plays, 60 yards, 2:23.
- MIN – Amp Lee 11-yard pass from Warren Moon (pass failed), 5:36. Bears 28–18. Drive: 16 plays, 76 yards, 7:06.
- CHI – Kevin Miniefield 48-yard fumble return (Kevin Butler kick), 3:05. Bears 35–18.

Top passers

- CHI – Steve Walsh – 15/23, 221 yards, 2 TD, INT
- MIN – Warren Moon – 29/52, 292 yards, 2 TD, 2 INT

Top rushers

- CHI – Raymont Harris – 13 rushes, 67 yards, TD
- MIN – Terry Allen – 12 rushes, 27 yards

Top receivers

- CHI – Jeff Graham – 4 receptions, 108 yards, TD
- MIN – Amp Lee – 11 receptions, 159 yards, TD

The Bears picked off Warren Moon twice while Steve Walsh threw two touchdowns, backs Raymont Harris and Lewis Tillman added rushing scores, and Kevin Miniefield ran back a Vikings fumble for a touchdown.

== Statistics ==
=== Team leaders ===
| Category | Player(s) | Value |
|---|---|---|
| Passing yards | Warren Moon | 4,264 |
| Passing touchdowns | Warren Moon | 18 |
| Rushing yards | Terry Allen | 1,031 |
| Rushing touchdowns | Terry Allen | 8 |
| Receptions | Cris Carter | 122 * |
| Receiving yards | Cris Carter | 1,256 |
| Receiving touchdowns | Cris Carter | 7 |
| Points | Fuad Reveiz | 132 |
| Kickoff return yards | Qadry Ismail | 807 |
| Punt return yards | David Palmer | 193 |
| Tackles | Jack Del Rio | 128 |
| Sacks | John Randle | 13.5 |
| Interceptions | Vencie Glenn; Anthony Parker | 4 |
| Forced fumbles | John Randle | 3 |

* Vikings single season record (tie).

=== League rankings ===
| Category | Total yards | Yards per game | NFL rank (out of 28) |
|---|---|---|---|
| Passing offense | 4,324 | 270.2 | 3rd |
| Rushing offense | 1,524 | 95.2 | 20th |
| Total offense | 5,848 | 365.5 | 3rd |
| Passing defense | 3,652 | 228.2 | 21st |
| Rushing defense | 1,090 | 68.1 | 1st |
| Total defense | 4,742 | 296.4 | 5th |

== Awards and honors ==
- Cris Carter, Led NFL in receptions
- Cris Carter, All-Pro selection
- Cris Carter, Pro Bowl selection
- Warren Moon, Pro Bowl selection 1994
- Warren Moon, NFL leader, passing yards, (4,264)

=== Milestones ===
- Cris Carter, 100 reception season (Carter finished the season with 122 receptions)
- Warren Moon, 3rd 4,000-yard passing season
- Warren Moon, 5th 400-yard passing game (November 6)
- Warren Moon, 6th 400-yard passing game (November 20)
