= 1995 Minnesota Vikings season =

NFL team season

- Head coach: Dennis Green
- Home stadium: Hubert H. Humphrey Metrodome

Results
- Record: 8–8
- Division place: 4th NFC Central
- Playoffs: Did not qualify
- All-Pros: G Randall McDaniel (1st team); DT John Randle (1st team); WR Cris Carter (2nd team)
- Pro Bowlers: WR Cris Carter; G Randall McDaniel; QB Warren Moon; DT John Randle

Uniform
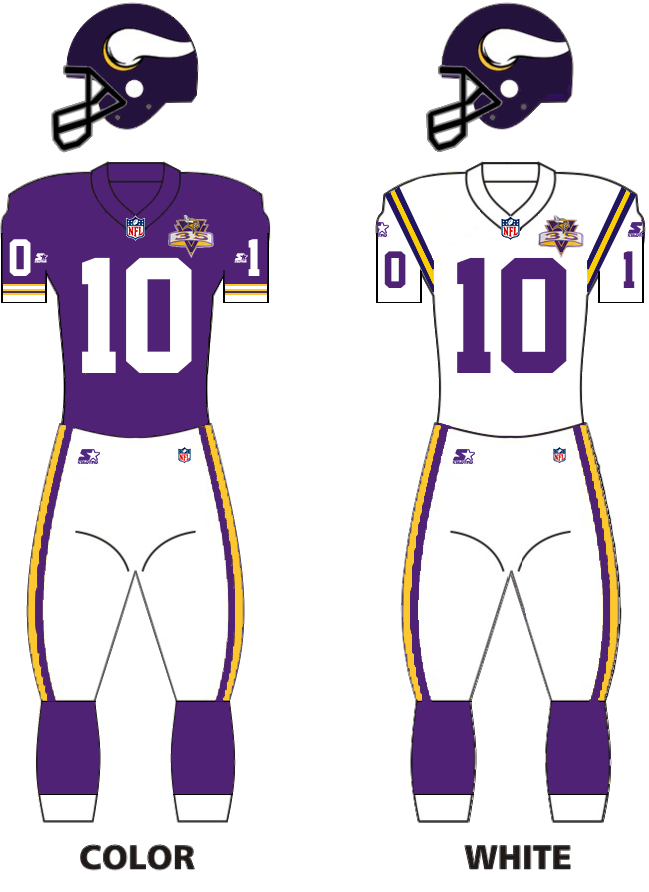

The 1995 season was the Minnesota Vikings' 35th in the National Football League (NFL). Under head coach Dennis Green, they finished with an 8–8 record and still had a chance to make the playoffs entering Week 17 against the Cincinnati Bengals; however, victories by the Chicago Bears and the Atlanta Falcons in their final games rendered the Vikings' defeat to the Bengals inconsequential, and Minnesota missed the playoffs for the first time since the 1991 season. Despite the team's poor play, rookie safety Orlando Thomas recorded a league-leading 9 interceptions of the season.

== Offseason ==
Additions	Subtractions
LB Jeff Brady (Buccaneers)	DT Henry Thomas (Lions)
DB Donald Frank (Raiders)	FS Vencie Glenn (Giants)
	RB Terry Allen (Redskins)
	LB Carlos Jenkins (Rams)
	TE Steve Jordan (retirement)
	S Todd Scott (Jets)
	T Reggie McElroy (Broncos)

=== 1995 expansion draft ===
Vikings selected during the expansion draft
Round	Selection	Name	Position	Expansion team
11	22	Dave Garnett	Linebacker	Carolina Panthers
26	52	William Sims	Linebacker	Carolina Panthers
32	63	Eric Guliford	Wide receiver	Carolina Panthers

=== 1995 draft ===
Pro Bowler

1995 Minnesota Vikings Draft
Draft order		Player name	Position	College	Notes
Round	Selection	Player name	Position	College	Notes
1	11	Derrick Alexander	Defensive end	Florida State	From Broncos, via Falcons (Note: The Vikings traded DE Chris Doleman and a 1994 second-round selection (45th overall) to the Falcons in exchange for a first-round selection (11th overall) and a 1994 second-round selection (40th overall).)
1	24	Korey Stringer	Offensive tackle	Ohio State	
2	42	Orlando Thomas	Safety	Southwestern Louisiana	From Broncos (Note: The Vikings traded OT Gary Zimmerman to the Broncos in exchange for a second-round selection (42nd overall) and 1994 first- selection and sixth-round selection (18th and 179th overall).)
2	55	Corey Fuller	Cornerback	Florida State	
3	89	Traded to the Houston Oilers (Note: The Vikings traded a third-round selection (89th overall) and a 1994 fourth-round selection (119th overall) to the Oilers in exchange for QB Warren Moon.)			
4	111	Chad May	Quarterback	Kansas State	From Broncos (Note: The Vikings traded fourth- and sixth-round selections (121st and 196th overall) to the Broncos in exchange for the a fourth-round selection (111th overall).)
4	121	Traded to the Denver Broncos			
5	157	James Stewart	Running back	Miami (FL)	
6	189	John Solomon	Defensive end	Sam Houston State	From Giants (Note: The Vikings traded S Vencie Glenn and a 1996 sixth-round selection (182nd overall) to the Giants in exchange for the a sixth-round selection (189th overall) and a 1996 fifth-round selection (137th overall).)
6	196	Traded to the Denver Broncos			
7	232	Jose White	Defensive tackle	Howard	
7	243	Jason Fisk	Defensive tackle	Stanford	Compensatory pick

=== Undrafted free agents ===
1995 undrafted free agents of note
Player	Position	College
Paul Burmeister	Quarterback	Iowa

== Staff ==
1995 Minnesota Vikings staff
Front office: Chairman of the board – John Skoglund; President/chief executive officer – Roger Headrick; Head coaches: Head coach – Dennis Green; Offensive coaches: Offensive coordinator – Brian Billick; Quarterbacks – Ray Sherman; Running backs – Carl Hargrave; Receivers – Chip Myers; Tight ends/assistant offensive line – Chris Foerster; Offensive line – Keith Rowen	Defensive coaches: Defensive coordinator – Tony Dungy; Defensive line – John Levra; Inside linebackers – Foge Fazio; Outside linebackers – Trent Walters; Defensive backs – Richard Solomon; Special teams coaches: Special teams – Gary Zauner; Strength and conditioning: Strength and conditioning – Steve Wetzel; Assistant strength and conditioning – Mark Asanovich

== Roster ==
1995 Minnesota Vikings roster
Quarterbacks (QB): 14 Brad Johnson; 5 Chad May; 1 Warren Moon; Running backs (RB): 29 Chuck Evans FB; 31 Scottie Graham; 32 Amp Lee; 30 Bobby Phillips; 26 Robert Smith; 28 James Stewart; Wide receivers (WR): 80 Cris Carter; 82 Qadry Ismail KR; 22 David Palmer; 86 Jake Reed; 81 Chris Walsh; Tight ends (TE): 87 Adrian Cooper; 85 Greg DeLong; 89 Andrew Jordan; 83 Mike Tice	Offensive linemen (OL): 63 Keith Alex G; 62 Jeff Christy C; 67 Rick Cunningham T; 71 David Dixon G; 66 John Gerak G; 61 Everett Lindsay G/C; 64 Randall McDaniel G; 73 Todd Steussie T; 77 Korey Stringer T; Defensive linemen (DL): 90 Derrick Alexander DE; 92 Roy Barker DE; 72 Jason Fisk DT; 99 James Harris DE; 91 Martin Harrison DE; 93 John Randle DT; 95 Fernando Smith DE; 98 Esera Tuaolo DT	Linebackers (LB): 53 Tuineau Alipate; 56 Pete Bercich OLB; 50 Jeff Brady MLB; 52 Richard Brown MLB; 55 Jack Del Rio MLB; 58 Ed McDaniel OLB; 51 Broderick Thomas OLB; Defensive backs (DB): 42 Harlon Barnett SS; 37 Donald Frank CB; 27 Corey Fuller CB; 24 Robert Griffith FS; 25 Alfred Jackson CB; 21 Charles Mincy S; 43 Orlando Thomas FS; 20 Dewayne Washington CB; Special teams (ST): 68 Mike Morris LS; 7 Fuad Reveiz K; 4 Mike Saxon P	Practice squad: 23 Shelly Hammonds CB; -- Mike Jerich T; -- Earl Mackey LB; -- Moses Ware WR; -- Jose White DT; Reserve: 78 Chris Hinton T (IR); 96 Keith Washington DE (IR); Rookies in italics 53 active, 2 reserve, 5 practice squad

== Preseason ==
Week	Date	Opponent	Result	Record	Venue	Attendance
1	August 7	at San Diego Chargers	W 23–19	1–0	Jack Murphy Stadium	47,934
2	August 12	at New England Patriots	L 14–21	1–1	Foxboro Stadium	56,241
3	August 18	Oakland Raiders	W 20–17	2–1	Hubert H. Humphrey Metrodome	45,306
4	August 26	Kansas City Chiefs	L 13–17	2–2	Hubert H. Humphrey Metrodome	39,349

== Regular season ==
=== Schedule ===
Week	Date	Opponent	Result	Record	Venue	Attendance
1	September 3	at **Chicago Bears**	**L** 14–31	0–1	Soldier Field	63,036
2	September 10	**Detroit Lions**	**W** 20–10	1–1	Hubert H. Humphrey Metrodome	52,234
3	September 17	Dallas Cowboys	**L** 17–23 (OT)	1–2	Hubert H. Humphrey Metrodome	60,088
4	September 24	at Pittsburgh Steelers	**W** 44–24	2–2	Three Rivers Stadium	57,853
5	Bye					
6	October 8	Houston Oilers	**W** 23–17 (OT)	3–2	Hubert H. Humphrey Metrodome	56,430
7	October 15	at **Tampa Bay Buccaneers**	**L** 17–20 (OT)	3–3	Tampa Stadium	55,703
8	October 22	at **Green Bay Packers**	**L** 21–38	3–4	Lambeau Field	60,332
9	October 30	**Chicago Bears**	**L** 6–14	3–5	Hubert H. Humphrey Metrodome	61,238
10	November 5	**Green Bay Packers**	**W** 27–24	4–5	Hubert H. Humphrey Metrodome	62,839
11	November 12	at Arizona Cardinals	**W** 30–24 (OT)	5–5	Sun Devil Stadium	51,342
12	November 19	New Orleans Saints	**W** 43–24	6–5	Hubert H. Humphrey Metrodome	58,108
13	November 23	at **Detroit Lions**	**L** 38–44	6–6	Silverdome	74,559
14	December 3	**Tampa Bay Buccaneers**	**W** 31–17	7–6	Hubert H. Humphrey Metrodome	52,879
15	December 9	Cleveland Browns	**W** 27–11	8–6	Hubert H. Humphrey Metrodome	47,984
16	December 18	at San Francisco 49ers	**L** 30–37	8–7	Candlestick Park	64,975
17	December 24	at Cincinnati Bengals	**L** 24–27	8–8	Riverfront Stadium	34,568

Note: Intra-division opponents are in bold text.

=== Standings ===
NFC Central
	W	L	T	PCT	PF	PA	STK
^{(3)} Green Bay Packers	11	5	0	.688	404	314	W2
^{(5)} Detroit Lions	10	6	0	.625	436	336	W7
Chicago Bears	9	7	0	.563	392	360	W2
Minnesota Vikings	8	8	0	.500	412	385	L2
Tampa Bay Buccaneers	7	9	0	.438	238	335	L2

== Statistics ==
=== Team leaders ===
Category	Player(s)	Value
Passing yards	Warren Moon	4,228
Passing touchdowns	Warren Moon	33
Rushing yards	Robert Smith	632
Rushing touchdowns	Robert Smith	5
Receiving yards	Cris Carter	1,371
Receiving touchdowns	Cris Carter	17
Points	Fuad Reveiz	122
Kickoff return yards	Qadry Ismail	1,037
Punt return yards	David Palmer	342
Tackles	Ed McDaniel	115
Sacks	John Randle	10.5
Interceptions	Orlando Thomas	9
Forced fumbles	Ed McDaniel	6

=== League rankings ===
Category	Total yards	Yards per game	NFL rank (out of 30)
Passing offense	4,205	262.8	5th
Rushing offense	1,733	108.3	16th
Total offense	5,938	371.1	4th
Passing defense	4,122	257.6	28th
Rushing defense	1,329	83.1	4th
Total defense	5,451	340.7	20th

== Awards and records ==
- Cris Carter, led NFL in receiving touchdowns
- Cris Carter, All-Pro selection
- Cris Carter, Pro Bowl selection
- Orlando Thomas, NFL interceptions leader (9)

=== Milestones ===
- Cris Carter, 100 reception season
- Warren Moon, 4th 4,000-yard passing season
