= 1996 Minnesota Vikings season =

NFL team season

- Head coach: Dennis Green
- Offensive coordinator: Brian Billick
- Defensive coordinator: Foge Fazio
- Home stadium: Hubert H. Humphrey Metrodome

Results
- Record: 9–7
- Division place: 2nd NFC Central
- Playoffs: Lost Wild Card Playoffs (at Cowboys) 15–40
- All-Pros: G Randall McDaniel (1st team); DT John Randle (1st team)
- Pro Bowlers: WR Cris Carter; G Randall McDaniel; DT John Randle

Uniform
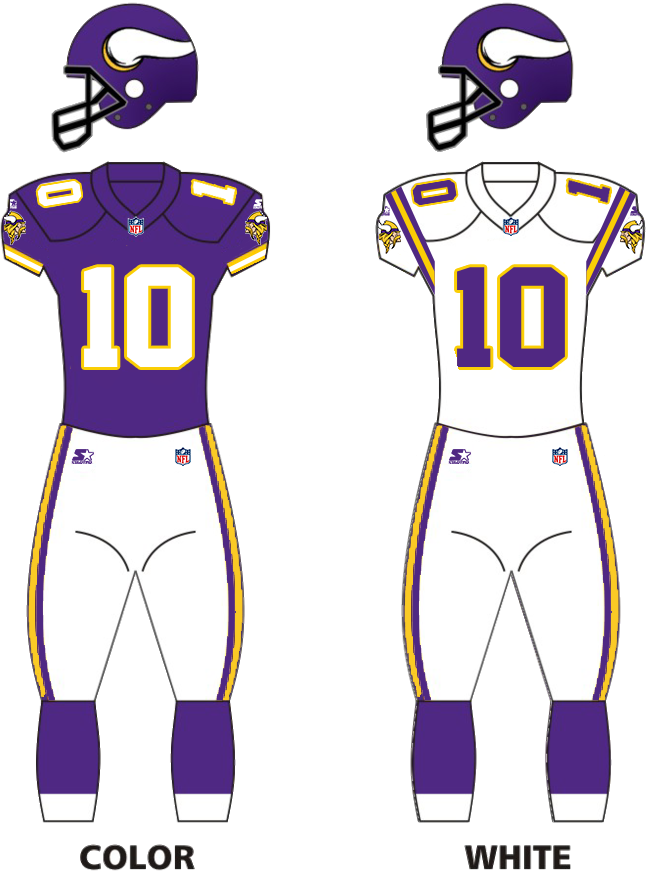

The 1996 season was the Minnesota Vikings' 36th in the National Football League (NFL). Under head coach Dennis Green, they finished with a 9–7 record and qualified for the playoffs after a one-year absence, starting a run of five consecutive playoff appearances.

They started the season with five wins in their first six games, before losing their next four. Starting quarterback Warren Moon suffered a broken collarbone during the season and missed the final six games, allowing fifth-year backup Brad Johnson to take his place. With Johnson under center, the Vikings won four of their remaining five games, including divisional victories on the road against the Detroit Lions and at home to the Tampa Bay Buccaneers. Those wins proved pivotal in the Vikings qualification for the playoffs, as their superior intra-conference record (8–4) over the Washington Redskins rendered Minnesota's week 17 loss to the eventual Super Bowl champion Green Bay Packers irrelevant, despite the Redskins defeating the defending Super Bowl champion Dallas Cowboys. The Vikings entered the playoffs as the number 6 seed in the NFC, pitting them against the Cowboys in the wildcard round. The Cowboys put up 30 unanswered points in the first half and ultimately won the game 40–15, making it the fourth time in five seasons that the Vikings' season ended in the wildcard round.

For the season, the Vikings sported new uniforms, adding the team's logo to both sleeves of the jersey as well as adding yellow number and yellow name outlines. These uniforms would remain in use with the Minnesota Vikings until 2005.

== Offseason ==
Additions	Subtractions
T Scott Dill (Buccaneers)	DE Roy Barker (49ers)
DE Robert Goff (Saints)	T Rick Cunningham (Raiders)
LB Dixon Edwards (Cowboys)	TE Adrian Cooper (49ers)
TE David Frisch (Patriots)	LB Jack Del Rio (Dolphins)
DB Anthony Prior (Jets)	S Charles Mincy (Buccaneers)
T Ariel Solomon (Steelers)	
LB Darryl Talley (Falcons)	

=== 1996 draft ===
1996 Minnesota Vikings Draft
Draft order		Player name	Position	College	Notes
Round	Selection	Player name	Position	College	Notes
1	16	Duane Clemons	Linebacker	California	
2	45	James Manley	Defensive tackle	Vanderbilt	
3	75	Moe Williams	Running back	Kentucky	
4	97	Hunter Goodwin	Tight end	Texas A&M	From Cardinals (Note: The Vikings traded their fourth- and fifth-round selections (112th and 137th overall) to the Cardinals in exchange for a fourth-round selection (97th overall).)
4	112	Traded to the Arizona Cardinals			
5	137	Traded to the Arizona Cardinals			From Giants (Note: The Vikings traded S Vencie Glenn and a sixth-round selection (182nd overall) to the Giants in exchange for a fifth-round selection (137th overall) and a 1995 sixth-round selection (189th overall).)
5	148	Sean Boyd	Defensive back	North Carolina	
6	182	Traded to the New York Giants			
7	223	Jon Merrill	Offensive tackle	Duke	

== Staff ==
1996 Minnesota Vikings staff
Front office: Chairman of the Board – John Skoglund; President/Chief Executive Officer – Roger Headrick; Head coaches: Head coach – Dennis Green; Offensive coaches: Offensive coordinator – Brian Billick; Quarterbacks – Ray Sherman; Running backs – Carl Hargrave; Receivers – Chip Myers; Tight ends – Mike Tice; Offensive line – Keith Rowen	Defensive coaches: Defensive coordinator – Foge Fazio; Defensive line – John Levra; Inside linebackers – Tom Olivadotti; Outside linebackers – Trent Walters; Defensive backs – Richard Solomon; Special teams coaches: Special teams – Gary Zauner; Strength and conditioning: Strength and conditioning – Steve Wetzel; Assistant strength and conditioning – Jeff Friday

== Roster ==
1996 Minnesota Vikings roster
Quarterbacks (QB): 14 Brad Johnson; 1 Warren Moon; 6 Jay Walker; Running backs (RB): 29 Chuck Evans FB; 31 Scottie Graham; 44 Leroy Hoard; 32 Amp Lee PR; 33 Harold Morrow FB; 21 Moe Williams RB; Wide receivers (WR): 84 Tony Bland; 80 Cris Carter; 82 Qadry Ismail KR; 22 David Palmer; 86 Jake Reed; 81 Chris Walsh; Tight ends (TE): 85 Greg DeLong; 83 David Frisch; 87 Hunter Goodwin; 89 Andrew Jordan	Offensive linemen (OL): 62 Jeff Christy C; 76 Scott Dill T; 71 David Dixon G; 66 John Gerak G; 64 Randall McDaniel G; 68 Mike Morris; 69 Ariel Solomon; 73 Todd Steussie T; 77 Korey Stringer T; Defensive linemen (DL): 90 Derrick Alexander DE; 92 Duane Clemons DE; 72 Jason Fisk DT; 94 Robert Goff DT; 91 Martin Harrison DE; 75 James Manley DT; 93 John Randle DT; 95 Fernando Smith DE; 98 Esera Tuaolo DT	Linebackers (LB): 56 Pete Bercich OLB; 50 Jeff Brady MLB; 52 Richard Brown MLB; 59 Dixon Edwards OLB; 54 Dave Garnett OLB; 55 Darryl Talley OLB; Defensive backs (DB): 42 Harlon Barnett SS; 27 Corey Fuller CB; 24 Robert Griffith SS; 25 Alfred Jackson CB; 35 Chris Johnson FS; 40 Anthony Prior CB; 43 Orlando Thomas FS; 20 Dewayne Washington CB; Special teams (ST): 17 Mitch Berger P; 9 Scott Sisson K	Practice squad: 74 Orlando Bobo G; 23 Kwame Ellis CB; 19 Lee Gissendaner WR; 60 Kenneth McDaniel G; Reserve: 51 Ben Hanks LB (IR); 61 Everett Lindsay G (IR); 48 Markco Maddox CB (IR); 58 Ed McDaniel LB (IR); 26 Robert Smith RB (IR); 28 James Stewart RB (IR); 37 Sean Vanhorse CB (IR); Rookies in italics 53 active, 7 reserve, 4 practice squad

== Preseason ==
Week	Date	Opponent	Result	Record	Venue	Attendance
1	August 3	San Diego Chargers	W 23–20 (OT)	1–0	Hubert H. Humphrey Metrodome	34,367
2	August 8	Buffalo Bills	L 12–35	1–1	Hubert H. Humphrey Metrodome	36,297
3	August 19	at Miami Dolphins	L 17–24	1–2	Joe Robbie Stadium	55,598
4	August 23	at New Orleans Saints	L 13–16	1–3	Louisiana Superdome	35,728

== Regular season ==
=== Schedule ===
Week	Date	Opponent	Result	Record	Venue	Attendance
1	September 1	**Detroit Lions**	**W** 17–13	1–0	Metrodome	52,972
2	September 8	at Atlanta Falcons	**W** 23–17	2–0	Georgia Dome	42,688
3	September 15	at **Chicago Bears**	**W** 20–14	3–0	Soldier Field	61,301
4	September 22	**Green Bay Packers**	**W** 30–21	4–0	Metrodome	64,168
5	September 29	at New York Giants	**L** 15–10	4–1	Giants Stadium	70,970
6	October 6	Carolina Panthers	**W** 14–12	5–1	Metrodome	60,894
7	October 13	at **Tampa Bay Buccaneers**	**L** 24–13	5–2	Houlihan's Stadium	32,175
8	Bye					
9	October 28	**Chicago Bears**	**L** 15–13	5–3	Metrodome	58,143
10	November 3	Kansas City Chiefs	**L** 21–6	5–4	Metrodome	59,552
11	November 10	at Seattle Seahawks	**L** 42–23	5–5	Kingdome	50,794
12	November 17	at Oakland Raiders	**W** 16–13 (OT)	6–5	Oakland–Alameda County Coliseum	41,183
13	November 24	Denver Broncos	**L** 21–17	6–6	Metrodome	59,142
14	December 1	Arizona Cardinals	**W** 41–17	7–6	Metrodome	45,767
15	December 8	at **Detroit Lions**	**W** 24–22	8–6	Silverdome	46,043
16	December 15	**Tampa Bay Buccaneers**	**W** 21–10	9–6	Metrodome	49,202
17	December 22	at **Green Bay Packers**	**L** 38–10	9–7	Lambeau Field	59,306

Note: Intra-division opponents are in bold text.

=== Standings ===
NFC Central
	W	L	T	PCT	PF	PA	STK
^{(1)} Green Bay Packers	13	3	0	.813	456	210	W5
^{(6)} Minnesota Vikings	9	7	0	.563	298	315	L1
Chicago Bears	7	9	0	.438	283	305	L1
Tampa Bay Buccaneers	6	10	0	.375	221	293	W1
Detroit Lions	5	11	0	.313	302	368	L5

== Postseason ==
Week	Date	Opponent	Result	Venue	Attendance
Wild Card	December 28	at Dallas Cowboys	L 40–15	Texas Stadium	64,682

== Statistics ==
=== Team leaders ===
Category	Player(s)	Value
Passing yards	Brad Johnson	2,258
Passing touchdowns	Brad Johnson	17
Rushing yards	Robert Smith	692
Rushing touchdowns	Leroy Hoard; Robert Smith	3
Receiving yards	Jake Reed	1,320
Receiving touchdowns	Cris Carter	10
Points	Scott Sisson	96
Kickoff return yards	Qadry Ismail	527
Punt return yards	David Palmer	216
Tackles	Jeff Brady	101
Sacks	John Randle	11.5
Interceptions	Orlando Thomas	5
Forced fumbles	John Randle	4

=== League rankings ===
Category	Total yards	Yards per game	NFL rank (out of 30)
Passing offense	3,658	228.6	8th
Rushing offense	1,546	96.6	24th
Total offense	5,204	325.2	12th
Passing defense	3,121	195.1	9th
Rushing defense	1,966	122.9	24th
Total defense	5,087	317.9	16th
