= 1993 Minnesota Vikings season =

NFL team season

- Owner: Roger Headrick
- General manager: Jeff Diamond
- Head coach: Dennis Green
- Offensive coordinator: Jack Burns; Brian Billick
- Defensive coordinator: Tony Dungy
- Home stadium: Hubert H. Humphrey Metrodome

Results
- Record: 9–7
- Division place: 2nd NFC Central
- Playoffs: Lost Wild Card Playoffs (at Giants) 10–17
- All-Pros: G Randall McDaniel (1st team); DT John Randle (1st team); DE Chris Doleman (2nd team); DT Henry Thomas (2nd team)
- Pro Bowlers: WR Cris Carter; DE Chris Doleman; G Randall McDaniel; DT John Randle

Uniform
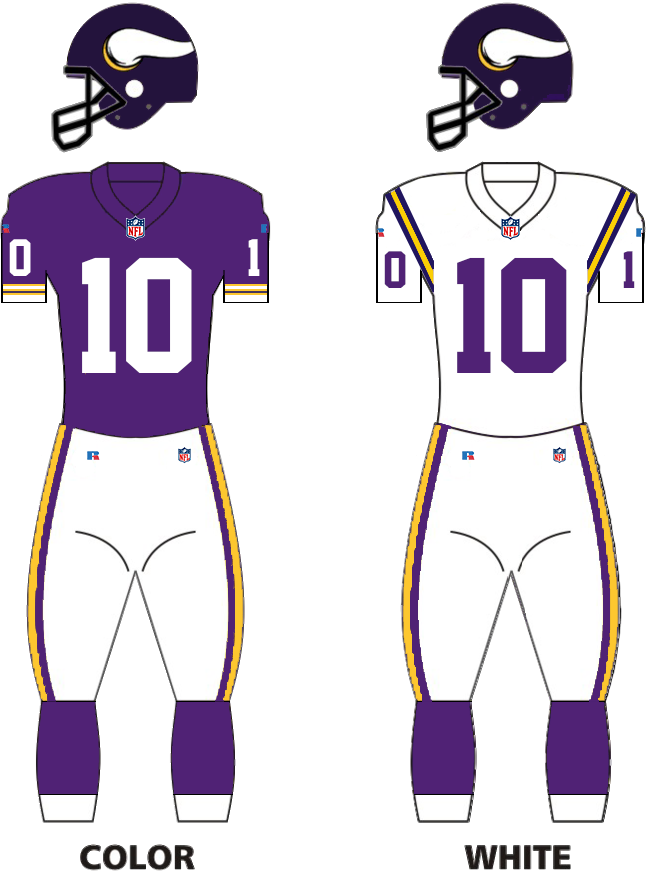

The 1993 season was the Minnesota Vikings' 33rd in the National Football League (NFL), and their second under head coach Dennis Green. The Vikings failed to match their 11–5 record from the previous season, finishing at 9–7. They finished in second place in the NFC Central to qualify for the playoffs, but lost 17–10 to the New York Giants in the wildcard round.

Newly acquired Jim McMahon, who was known for helping the Chicago Bears win Super Bowl XX in the 1985 season, was the Vikings starting quarterback for the season. He spent only one year with the team and after the season, the rebuilding Vikings decided not to renew McMahon's contract and he would go on to sign with other teams. The Vikings later acquired Warren Moon for next season.

Cris Carter and John Randle were named to play in the Pro Bowl after the season. It was the first Pro Bowl for both future Hall of Famers. Terry Allen, who had a breakout season the previous year, missed the entire season after tearing his ACL in practice.

== Offseason ==
| Additions | Subtractions |
|---|---|
| QB Jim McMahon (Eagles) | QB Rich Gannon (Redskins) |
| LB Fred Strickland (Rams) | G Brian Habib (Broncos) |
| | WR Hassan Jones (Chiefs) |
| | C Kirk Lowdermilk (Colts) |
| | LB Mike Merriweather (Jets) |
| | RB Darrin Nelson (retirement) |
| | DE Al Noga (Redskins) |
| | T Gary Zimmerman (Broncos) |
| | S Felix Wright (Chiefs) |

=== 1993 draft ===
| =Pro Bowler |

1993 Minnesota Vikings Draft
| Draft order | | Player name | Position | College | Notes |
| Round | Selection | Player name | Position | College | Notes |
|---|---|---|---|---|---|
| 1 | 21 | Robert Smith | Running back | Ohio State | |
| 2 | 52 | Qadry Ismail | Wide receiver | Syracuse | |
| 3 | 57 | John Gerak | Guard | Penn State | From Patriots, via Raiders and Seahawks (Note: The Vikings traded DT Keith Millard to the Seahawks in exchange for a third-round selection (57th overall) and 1992 second-round selection (39th overall).) |
| 3 | 79 | Gilbert Brown | Defensive tackle | Kansas | |
| 4 | 106 | Ashley Sheppard | Linebacker | Clemson | |
| 5 | 133 | Everett Lindsay | Offensive tackle | Ole Miss | |
| 6 | 160 | Traded to the Washington Redskins (Note: The Vikings traded their sixth-round selection (160th overall) to the Redskins in exchange for DE George Hinkle and WR Joe Johnson.) | | | |
| 7 | 192 | Gino Torretta | Quarterback | Miami (FL) | |
| 8 | 219 | Traded to the San Francisco 49ers (Note: The Vikings traded their eighth-round selection (219th overall) to the 49ers in exchange for RB Keith Henderson.) | | | |

=== Undrafted free agents ===
1993 undrafted free agents of note
| Player | Position | College |
|---|---|---|
| Ron Carpenter | S | Miami (OH) |
| Matt Eller | DE | Bethel (MN) |
| Eric Guliford | WR | Arizona State |
| Dave Garnett | LB | Stanford |
| Shawn Jones | S | Georgia Tech |
| Robert Staten | FB | Jackson State |

== Staff ==
1993 Minnesota Vikings staff
| Front office: Chairman of the board – John Skoglund; President/chief executive officer – Roger Headrick; Head coaches: Head coach – Dennis Green; Offensive coaches: Offensive coordinator/quarterbacks – Jack Burns; Running backs – Tyrone Willingham; Receivers – Tom Moore; Tight ends – Brian Billick; Offensive line – John Michels; Assistant offensive line – Chris Foerster | Defensive coaches: Defensive coordinator – Tony Dungy; Defensive line – John Teerlinck; Inside linebackers – Monte Kiffin; Outside linebackers – Richard Solomon; Secondary – Willie Shaw; Special teams coaches: Special teams – Tom Batta; Strength and conditioning: Strength and conditioning – Steve Wetzel; Strength and conditioning assistant – Mike Wolf |

== Roster ==
1993 Minnesota Vikings roster
| Quarterbacks (QB): 14 Brad Johnson; 9 Jim McMahon; 12 Sean Salisbury; 13 Gino Torretta; Running backs (RB): 33 Roger Craig; 31 Scottie Graham; 23 Barry Word; Wide receivers (WR): 81 Anthony Carter; 80 Cris Carter; 84 Eric Guliford PR; 82 Qadry Ismail KR; 86 Jake Reed; 89 Olanda Truitt; Tight ends (TE): 48 Todd Harrison; 83 Steve Jordan; 85 Brent Novoselsky; 46 Derek Tennell; 87 Mike Tice | Offensive linemen (OL): 72 Scott Adams G; 62 Jeff Christy C; 71 Bernard Dafney T; 66 John Gerak G; 76 Tim Irwin T; 69 Todd Kalis G; 64 Randall McDaniel G; 60 Adam Schreiber C; Defensive linemen (DL): 92 Roy Barker DE; 77 Brad Culpepper DT; 56 Chris Doleman DE; 99 James Harris DE; 90 Robert Harris DE; 93 John Randle DT; 97 Henry Thomas DT; 94 John Thornton DT; 98 Esera Tuaolo DT | Linebackers (LB): 50 Bobby Abrams OLB; 55 Jack Del Rio MLB; 54 Dave Garnett OLB; 51 Carlos Jenkins OLB; 91 Greg Manusky MLB; 58 Ed McDaniel OLB; 53 Fred Strickland OLB; Defensive backs (DB): 25 Vencie Glenn FS; 32 Shawn Jones FS; 39 Carl Lee CB; 37 Lamar McGriggs SS; 26 Audray McMillian CB; 27 Anthony Parker; 24 J. C. Pearson CB/S; 38 Todd Scott SS; Special teams (ST): 68 Mike Morris LS; 18 Harry Newsome P; 7 Fuad Reveiz K | Practice squad: 57 William Sims LB; -- Robert Staten FB; -- David Wilson S; Reserve: 21 Terry Allen RB (IR); 29 Chuck Evans FB (IR); 61 Everett Lindsay T (IR); 59 Ashley Sheppard LB (IR); 26 Robert Smith RB (IR); 35 Ronnie West WR (IR); Rookies in italics 53 active, 6 reserve, 3 practice squad |

== Preseason ==
| Week | Date | Opponent | Result | Record | Venue | Attendance | Notes |
|---|---|---|---|---|---|---|---|
| 1 | August 1 | at Dallas Cowboys | W 13–7 | 1–0 | Texas Stadium | 60,010 | |
| 2 | August 7 | Buffalo Bills | W 20–6 | 2–0 | Olympiastadion, Berlin | 67,132 | American Bowl |
| 3 | August 14 | Seattle Seahawks | W 23–10 | 3–0 | Hubert H. Humphrey Metrodome | 42,240 | |
| 4 | August 21 | at Kansas City Chiefs | L 20–27 | 3–1 | Arrowhead Stadium | 73,080 | |
| 5 | August 26 | Pittsburgh Steelers | W 30–13 | 4–1 | Hubert H. Humphrey Metrodome | 41,512 | |

== Regular season ==
=== Schedule ===
| Week | Date | Opponent | Result | Record | Venue | Attendance |
|---|---|---|---|---|---|---|
| 1 | September 5 | at Los Angeles Raiders | L 24–7 | 0–1 | Los Angeles Memorial Coliseum | 44,120 |
| 2 | September 12 | Chicago Bears | W 10–7 | 1–1 | Hubert H. Humphrey Metrodome | 57,921 |
| 3 | Bye | | | | | |
| 4 | September 26 | Green Bay Packers | W 15–13 | 2–1 | Hubert H. Humphrey Metrodome | 61,746 |
| 5 | October 3 | at San Francisco 49ers | L 38–19 | 2–2 | Candlestick Park | 63,071 |
| 6 | October 10 | Tampa Bay Buccaneers | W 15–0 | 3–2 | Hubert H. Humphrey Metrodome | 54,215 |
| 7 | Bye | | | | | |
| 8 | October 25 | at Chicago Bears | W 19–12 | 4–2 | Soldier Field | 64,677 |
| 9 | October 31 | Detroit Lions | L 30–27 | 4–3 | Hubert H. Humphrey Metrodome | 53,428 |
| 10 | November 7 | San Diego Chargers | L 30–17 | 4–4 | Hubert H. Humphrey Metrodome | 55,527 |
| 11 | November 14 | at Denver Broncos | W 26–23 | 5–4 | Mile High Stadium | 67,329 |
| 12 | November 21 | at Tampa Bay Buccaneers | L 23–10 | 5–5 | Tampa Stadium | 40,848 |
| 13 | November 28 | New Orleans Saints | L 17–14 | 5–6 | Hubert H. Humphrey Metrodome | 53,030 |
| 14 | December 5 | at Detroit Lions | W 13–0 | 6–6 | Silverdome | 63,216 |
| 15 | December 12 | Dallas Cowboys | L 37–20 | 6–7 | Hubert H. Humphrey Metrodome | 63,321 |
| 16 | December 19 | at Green Bay Packers | W 21–17 | 7–7 | Milwaukee County Stadium | 54,773 |
| 17 | December 26 | Kansas City Chiefs | W 30–10 | 8–7 | Hubert H. Humphrey Metrodome | 59,236 |
| 18 | December 31 | at Washington Redskins | W 14–9 | 9–7 | Robert F. Kennedy Memorial Stadium | 42,836 |

=== Game summaries ===
==== Week 4: vs Green Bay Packers ====
Week 4: Green Bay Packers at Minnesota Vikings – Game summary

| Quarter | 1 | 2 | 3 | 4 | Total |
|---|---|---|---|---|---|
| Packers | 7 | 3 | 0 | 3 | 13 |
| Vikings | 3 | 3 | 6 | 3 | 15 |

at Hubert H. Humphrey Metrodome, Minneapolis, Minnesota

- Date: September 26
- Game time: 1:00 p.m.
- Game weather: None (indoor stadium)
- Game attendance: 61,077
- Referee: Howard Roe (33)
- TV: CBS
- Pro-Football-Reference.com, NFL Game Book

Game information

First quarter

- GB – Brett Favre 2-yard run (Chris Jacke kick), 6:05. Packers 7–0. Drive: 14 plays, 85 yards, 8:55.
- MIN – Fuad Reveiz 35-yard field goal, 1:35. Packers 7–3. Drive: 4 plays, 9 yards, 2:06.

Second quarter

- MIN – Fuad Reveiz 19-yard field goal, 4:31. Packers 7–6. Drive: 17 plays, 81 yards, 9:41.
- GB – Chris Jacke 49-yard field goal, 0:03. Packers 10–6. Drive: 13 plays, 47 yards, 4:28.

Third quarter

- MIN – Fuad Reveiz 29-yard field goal, 10:50. Packers 10–9. Drive: 9 plays, 44 yards, 4:10.
- MIN – Fuad Reveiz 51-yard field goal, 5:35. Vikings 12–10. Drive: 8 plays, 39 yards, 2:26.

Fourth quarter

- GB – Chris Jacke 20-yard field goal, 13:48. Packers 13–12. Drive: 7 plays, 40 yards, 4:06.
- MIN – Fuad Reveiz 22-yard field goal, 0:04. Vikings 15–13. Drive: 11 plays, 78 yards, 1:49.

Top passers

- GB – Brett Favre – 20/31, 150 yards, 2 INT
- MIN – Jim McMahon – 18/35, 217 yards

Top rushers

- GB – John Stephens – 8 rushes, 62 yards
- MIN – Barry Word – 19 rushes, 65 yards

Top receivers

- GB – Edgar Bennett – 6 receptions, 49 yards
- MIN – Eric Guliford – 1 reception, 45 yards

=== Standings ===
NFC Central
| | W | L | T | PCT | PF | PA | STK |
|---|---|---|---|---|---|---|---|
| ^{(3)} Detroit Lions | 10 | 6 | 0 | .625 | 298 | 292 | W2 |
| ^{(5)} Minnesota Vikings | 9 | 7 | 0 | .563 | 277 | 290 | W3 |
| ^{(6)} Green Bay Packers | 9 | 7 | 0 | .563 | 340 | 282 | L1 |
| Chicago Bears | 7 | 9 | 0 | .438 | 234 | 230 | L4 |
| Tampa Bay Buccaneers | 5 | 11 | 0 | .313 | 237 | 376 | L1 |

== Postseason ==
| Week | Date | Opponent (seed) | Result | Record | Venue | Attendance |
|---|---|---|---|---|---|---|
| Wild Card | January 9 | at New York Giants (#4) | L 17–10 | 0–1 | Giants Stadium | 75,089 |

== Statistics ==
=== Team leaders ===
| Category | Player(s) | Value |
|---|---|---|
| Passing yards | Jim McMahon | 1,968 |
| Passing touchdowns | Jim McMahon; Sean Salisbury | 9 |
| Rushing yards | Scottie Graham | 488 |
| Rushing touchdowns | Scottie Graham | 3 |
| Receiving yards | Cris Carter | 1,071 |
| Receiving touchdowns | Cris Carter | 9 |
| Points | Fuad Reveiz | 105 |
| Kickoff return yards | Qadry Ismail | 902 |
| Punt return yards | Eric Guliford | 212 |
| Tackles | Fred Strickland | 110 |
| Sacks | Chris Doleman; John Randle | 12.5 |
| Interceptions | Vencie Glenn | 5 |
| Forced fumbles | Roy Barker; Chris Doleman; Carlos Jenkins; John Randle | 3 |

=== League rankings ===
| Category | Total yards | Yards per game | NFL rank (out of 28) |
|---|---|---|---|
| Passing offense | 3,200 | 200.0 | 14th |
| Rushing offense | 1,624 | 101.5 | 21st |
| Total offense | 4,824 | 301.5 | 17th |
| Passing defense | 2,870 | 179.4 | 6th |
| Rushing defense | 1,536 | 96.0 | 6th |
| Total defense | 4,406 | 275.4 | 1st |
