= 1997 Minnesota Vikings season =

NFL team season

- Head coach: Dennis Green
- Offensive coordinator: Brian Billick
- Defensive coordinator: Foge Fazio
- Home stadium: Hubert H. Humphrey Metrodome

Results
- Record: 9–7
- Division place: 4th NFC Central
- Playoffs: Won Wild Card Playoffs (at Giants) 23–22; Lost Divisional Playoffs (at 49ers) 22–38
- All-Pros: DT John Randle (1st team); G Randall McDaniel (2nd team); T Todd Steussie (2nd team)
- Pro Bowlers: WR Cris Carter; G Randall McDaniel; DT John Randle; T Todd Steussie

Uniform
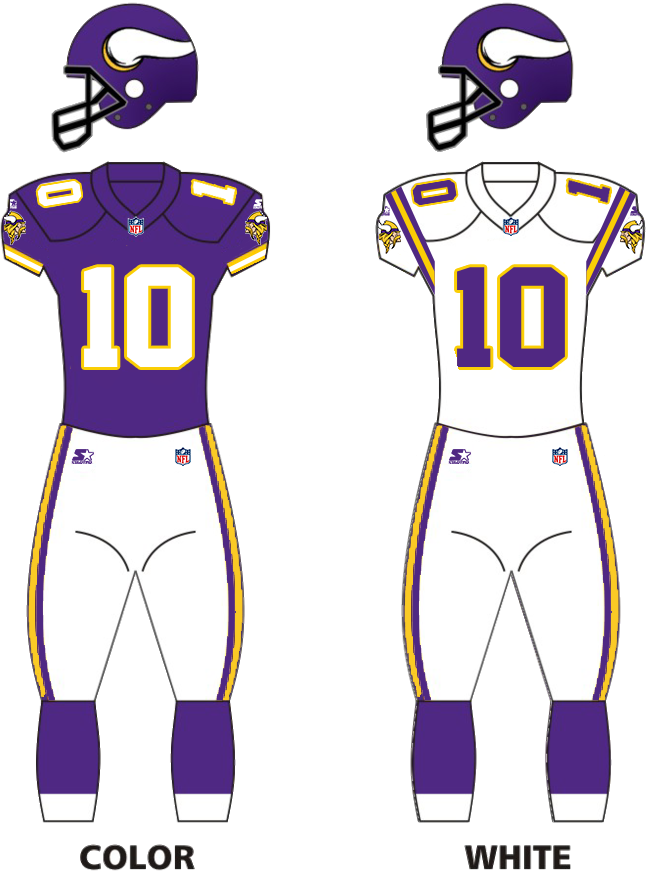

The 1997 season was the Minnesota Vikings' 37th in the National Football League (NFL) and their sixth under head coach Dennis Green. Despite an 8–2 start, the Vikings would go on to lose five consecutive games, finishing fourth in the division. The team ultimately won their final game of the regular season, matching their 9–7 record from 1996 and claiming the 6th seed in the playoffs for a second consecutive year. In the Wild Card Round against the New York Giants, the Vikings came back from a 22–13 deficit with 90 seconds to play to win 23–22, their first playoff victory since 1988. In the Divisional Round, the Vikings were defeated 38–22 by the San Francisco 49ers.

Vikings defensive tackle John Randle led the league in sacks with 15.5. Wide receiver Cris Carter's 13 touchdown receptions also were most in the league.

Before the season, the Vikings acquired Randall Cunningham after a year out of the game, a move that reunited Cunningham with his former Philadelphia Eagles teammate Cris Carter.

One notable moment from the season, was in the Week 7 game against the Carolina Panthers, Brad Johnson threw a touchdown pass to himself, making it the first time in NFL history that it happened. It would not happen again until Marcus Mariota of the Tennessee Titans did it in the 2017 AFC Wild Card Round against the Kansas City Chiefs.

== Offseason ==
=== 1997 draft ===
1997 Minnesota Vikings Draft
Draft order		Player name	Position	College	Notes
Round	Selection	Player name	Position	College	Notes
1	20	Dwayne Rudd	Linebacker	Alabama	
2	49	Torrian Gray	Safety	Virginia Tech	
3	78	Stalin Colinet	Defensive end	Boston College	
4	113	Antonio Banks	Defensive back	Virginia Tech	
5	151	Tony Williams	Defensive tackle	Memphis	
6	183	Robert Tate	Wide receiver	Cincinnati	
7	220	Artie Ulmer	Linebacker	Valdosta State	
7	235	Matthew Hatchette	Wide receiver	Langston	Compensatory pick

== Staff ==
1997 Minnesota Vikings staff
Front office: Chairman of the board – John Skoglund; President/chief executive officer – Roger Headrick; Head coaches: Head coach – Dennis Green; Offensive coaches: Offensive coordinator – Brian Billick; Quarterbacks – Ray Sherman; Running backs – Carl Hargrave; Receivers – Chip Myers; Tight ends – Dave Atkins; Offensive line – Mike Tice; Coaching assistant – Wade Harman	Defensive coaches: Defensive coordinator – Foge Fazio; Defensive line – John Levra; Inside linebackers – Tom Olivadotti; Outside linebackers – Trent Walters; Defensive backs – Richard Solomon; Special teams coaches: Special teams – Gary Zauner; Strength and conditioning: Strength and conditioning – Steve Wetzel; Assistant strength and conditioning – Jeff Friday

== Roster ==
1997 Minnesota Vikings roster
Quarterbacks (QB): 8 Todd Bouman; 7 Randall Cunningham; 6 Jay Walker; Running backs (RB): 29 Chuck Evans FB; 32 Robert Green; 44 Leroy Hoard; 33 Harold Morrow FB; 22 David Palmer; 26 Robert Smith; 21 Moe Williams; Wide receivers (WR): 84 Tony Bland; 80 Cris Carter; 89 Matthew Hatchette; 86 Jake Reed; 81 Chris Walsh; Tight ends (TE): 85 Greg DeLong; 82 Andrew Glover; 87 Hunter Goodwin	Offensive linemen (OL): 74 Orlando Bobo G; 69 LeShun Daniels G; 71 David Dixon G; 61 Everett Lindsay C; 64 Randall McDaniel G; 68 Mike Morris; 79 Eric Moss G; 78 Bob Sapp G; 73 Todd Steussie T; 77 Korey Stringer T; Defensive linemen (DL): 90 Derrick Alexander DE; 96 Jerry Ball DT; 92 Duane Clemons DE; 99 Stalin Colinet DT; 72 Jason Fisk DT; 93 John Randle DT; 95 Fernando Smith DE; 94 Tony Williams DT	Linebackers (LB): 56 Pete Bercich MLB; 50 Jeff Brady MLB; 59 Dixon Edwards OLB; 55 Ron George OLB; 58 Ed McDaniel OLB; 57 Dwayne Rudd OLB; 53 Artie Ulmer MLB; Defensive backs (DB): 43 Greg Briggs SS; 31 Duane Butler SS; 27 Corey Fuller CB; 23 Torrian Gray FS; 24 Robert Griffith SS; 42 Orlando Thomas FS; 20 Dewayne Washington CB; 37 Leonard Wheeler CB; Special teams (ST): 17 Mitch Berger P; 3 Eddie Murray K	Practice squad: 60 Ben Lynch C; 19 Yo Murphy WR; Reserve: 30 Antonio Banks CB (IR); 62 Jeff Christy C (IR); 76 Scott Dill T (IR); 14 Brad Johnson QB (IR); 40 Anthony Prior CB (IR); 83 Robert Tate (IR); Rookies in italics 53 active, 6 reserve, 2 practice squad

== Preseason ==
Week	Date	Opponent	Result	Record	Venue	Attendance	Notes
1	July 26	Seattle Seahawks	W 28–26	1–0	Fawcett Stadium (Canton, OH)	23,846	Hall of Fame Game
2	August 2	St. Louis Rams	W 26–6	2–0	Hubert H. Humphrey Metrodome	36,971	
3	August 8	at Buffalo Bills	L 3–19	2–1	Rich Stadium	32,559	
4	August 16	at Cincinnati Bengals	L 13–37	2–2	Cinergy Field	44,316	
5	August 22	San Diego Chargers	W 28–22	3–2	Hubert H. Humphrey Metrodome	44,300	

== Regular season ==
=== Schedule ===
Week	Date	Opponent	Result	Record	Venue	Attendance
1	August 31	at Buffalo Bills	**W** 34–13	1–0	Rich Stadium	79,139
2	September 7	at **Chicago Bears**	**W** 27–24	2–0	Soldier Field	59,263
3	September 14	**Tampa Bay Buccaneers**	**L** 28–14	2–1	Hubert H. Humphrey Metrodome	63,697
4	September 21	at **Green Bay Packers**	**L** 38–32	2–2	Lambeau Field	60,115
5	September 28	Philadelphia Eagles	**W** 28–19	3–2	Hubert H. Humphrey Metrodome	55,149
6	October 5	at Arizona Cardinals	**W** 20–19	4–2	Sun Devil Stadium	45,550
7	October 12	Carolina Panthers	**W** 21–14	5–2	Hubert H. Humphrey Metrodome	62,625
8	Bye					
9	October 26	at **Tampa Bay Buccaneers**	**W** 10–6	6–2	Houlihan's Stadium	66,815
10	November 2	New England Patriots	**W** 23–18	7–2	Hubert H. Humphrey Metrodome	62,917
11	November 9	**Chicago Bears**	**W** 29–22	8–2	Hubert H. Humphrey Metrodome	63,443
12	November 16	at **Detroit Lions**	**L** 38–15	8–3	Silverdome	68,910
13	November 23	at New York Jets	**L** 23–21	8–4	Giants Stadium	70,131
14	December 1	**Green Bay Packers**	**L** 27–11	8–5	Hubert H. Humphrey Metrodome	64,001
15	December 7	at San Francisco 49ers	**L** 28–17	8–6	3Com Park	55,761
16	December 14	**Detroit Lions**	**L** 14–13	8–7	Hubert H. Humphrey Metrodome	60,982
17	December 21	Indianapolis Colts	**W** 39–28	9–7	Hubert H. Humphrey Metrodome	54,107

Note: Intra-division opponents are in bold text.

=== Standings ===
NFC Central
	W	L	T	PCT	PF	PA	STK
^{(2)} Green Bay Packers	13	3	0	.813	422	282	W5
^{(4)} Tampa Bay Buccaneers	10	6	0	.625	299	263	W1
^{(5)} Detroit Lions	9	7	0	.563	379	306	W2
^{(6)} Minnesota Vikings	9	7	0	.563	354	359	W1
Chicago Bears	4	12	0	.250	263	421	L1

== Postseason ==
Week	Date	Opponent	Result	Record	Venue	Attendance
Wild Card	December 27	at New York Giants	W 23–22	1–0	Giants Stadium	77,497
Division	January 3	at San Francisco 49ers	L 38–22	1–1	3Com Park	65,018

== Statistics ==
=== Team leaders ===
Category	Player(s)	Value
Passing yards	Brad Johnson	3,036
Passing touchdowns	Brad Johnson	20
Rushing yards	Robert Smith	1,266
Rushing touchdowns	Robert Smith	6
Receiving yards	Jake Reed	1,138
Receiving touchdowns	Cris Carter	13
Points	Cris Carter	84
Kickoff return yards	David Palmer	711
Punt return yards	David Palmer	444
Tackles	Robert Griffith	114
Sacks	John Randle	15.5
Interceptions	Dewayne Washington	4
Forced fumbles	Derrick Alexander	3

=== League rankings ===
Category	Total yards	Yards per game	NFL rank (out of 30)
Passing offense	3,313	207.1	14th
Rushing offense	2,041	127.6	6th
Total offense	5,354	334.6	8th
Passing defense	3,704	231.5	29th
Rushing defense	1,983	123.9	23rd
Total defense	5,687	355.4	29th
