= Amp Lee =

American football player and coach (born 1971)

No. 22, 32, 31, 28
- Position: Running back

Personal information
- Born: October 1, 1971 (age 55); Chipley, Florida, U.S.
- Listed height: 5 ft 11 in (1.80 m)
- Listed weight: 200 lb (91 kg)

Career information
- High school: Chipley
- College: Florida State
- NFL draft: 1992: 2nd round, 45th overall pick

Career history

Playing
- San Francisco 49ers (1992–1993); Minnesota Vikings (1994–1996); St. Louis Rams (1997–1999); Philadelphia Eagles (2000); Detroit Lions (2001)*
- * Offseason or practice squad member only

Coaching
- Amsterdam Admirals (2003) Running backs coach; Berlin Thunder (2004) Running backs coach; Las Vegas Locomotives (2009–2012) Running backs coach

Awards and highlights
- Super Bowl champion (XXXIV); PFWA All-Rookie Team (1992); First-team All-American (1991); First-team All-South Independent (1990); 2× UFL champion (2009, 2010)

Career NFL statistics
- Rushing yards: 1,512
- Rushing average: 3.9
- Rushing touchdowns: 7
- Receptions: 335
- Receiving yards: 3,099
- Receiving touchdowns: 15
- Stats at Pro Football Reference

Anthonia Wayne "Amp" Lee (born October 1, 1971) is an American former professional football player who was a running back for nine seasons in the National Football League (NFL). He played college football for the Florida State Seminoles, earning first-team All-American honors in 1991. After his playing career, he was a running back coach in NFL Europe and the United Football League.

== Playing career ==
Lee was drafted by the San Francisco 49ers in the second round of the 1992 NFL draft. A 5'11", 200-lb. running back from Florida State University, Lee played in nine NFL seasons from 1992 to 2000. His best year as a professional came during the 1995 season as a member of the Minnesota Vikings when he caught 71 receptions. In 1997, Lee was named team MVP for the St. Louis Rams. He was a part of the Rams' Super Bowl XXXIV winning team.

Lee caught Joe Montana's final touchdown pass for the 49ers in 1992.

== NFL career statistics ==
Legend
	Won the Super Bowl
	Led the league
**Bold**	Career high

=== Regular season ===
Year	Team	Games		Rushing					Receiving				
Year	Team	GP	GS	Att	Yds	Avg	Lng	TD	Rec	Yds	Avg	Lng	TD
1992	SFO	**16**	**3**	**91**	362	4.0	43	**2**	20	102	5.1	17	2
1993	SFO	15	**3**	72	230	3.2	13	1	16	115	7.2	22	2
1994	MIN	13	0	29	104	3.6	16	0	45	368	8.2	35	2
1995	MIN	**16**	**3**	69	**371**	**5.4**	**66**	**2**	**71**	558	7.9	33	1
1996	MIN	**16**	**3**	51	161	3.2	12	0	54	422	7.8	21	2
1997	STL	**16**	1	28	104	3.7	14	0	61	**825**	13.5	**62**	**3**
1998	STL	14	2	44	175	4.0	38	**2**	64	667	10.4	44	2
1999	STL	7	0	3	3	1.0	4	0	3	22	7.3	15	1
2000	PHI	3	0	1	2	2.0	2	0	1	20	**20.0**	20	0
Career		116	15	388	1,512	3.9	66	7	335	3,099	9.3	62	15

=== Playoffs ===
Year	Team	Games		Rushing					Receiving				
Year	Team	GP	GS	Att	Yds	Avg	Lng	TD	Rec	Yds	Avg	Lng	TD
1992	SFO	1	0	1	6	**6.0**	6	0	0	0	0.0	0	0
1993	SFO	2	0	1	5	5.0	5	0	2	15	7.5	10	0
1994	MIN	1	0	0	0	0.0	0	0	**11**	**159**	14.5	38	**1**
1996	MIN	1	0	**7**	**26**	3.7	**8**	0	2	59	**29.5**	**43**	0
1999	STL	**3**	0	1	1	1.0	1	0	0	0	0.0	0	0
Career		8	0	10	38	3.8	8	0	15	233	15.5	43	1

== Coaching career ==
Lee was the running backs coach for the Las Vegas Locomotives of the United Football League during their existence from 2009 to 2012.

== Personal life ==
Lee is the father of former Phoenix Suns guard Saben Lee.
