= Robert Smith (running back) =

American football player (born 1972)

No. 20, 26
- Position: Running back

Personal information
- Born: March 4, 1972 (age 54); Euclid, Ohio, U.S.
- Listed height: 6 ft 2 in (1.88 m)
- Listed weight: 210 lb (95 kg)

Career information
- High school: Euclid
- College: Ohio State (1990–1992)
- NFL draft: 1993: 1st round, 21st overall pick

Career history
- Minnesota Vikings (1993–2000)

Awards and highlights
- Second-team All-Pro (2000); 2× Pro Bowl (1998, 2000); 50 Greatest Vikings; Minnesota Vikings 40th Anniversary Team; Minnesota Vikings All-Mall of America Field Team; Big Ten Freshman of the Year (1990); Second-team All-Big Ten (1992)

Career NFL statistics
- Rushing yards: 6,818
- Rushing average: 4.8
- Rushing touchdowns: 32
- Receptions: 178
- Receiving yards: 1,292
- Receiving touchdowns: 6
- Stats at Pro Football Reference

Robert Scott Smith (born March 4, 1972) is an American college football analyst for Fox Sports and the Big Ten Network. He played professionally as a running back in the National Football League (NFL) for eight seasons with the Minnesota Vikings, and played college football for the Ohio State Buckeyes.

== Early life ==
Born and raised in Euclid, Ohio, a suburb on the northeastern border of Cleveland, Smith became the first player to win Ohio's Mr. Football Award twice (in 1988 and 1989). As a junior at Euclid High School, he gained 1,564 yards on 177 rushes (8.8 yards per carry) and averaged 31 yards on 10 punt returns. In his senior season in 1989, he gained 2,042 yards on 203 carries and scored 31 touchdowns and was awarded the Bobby Dodd National Back of the Year by the Touchdown Club of Atlanta. During his Panthers' career, he rushed for a total of 5,038 yards on 548 carries with 67 touchdowns.

In track and field, Smith posted personal best times of 10.68 seconds in the 100 meters, 21.10 seconds in the 200 meters, and 46.41 seconds in the 400 meters.

== College career ==
Smith narrowed his college choices to Miami, USC, UCLA, and Ohio State. In his two seasons with the Buckeyes (1990, 1992), Smith ran for a total of 1,945 yards, leading the team both years. As a freshman in 1990, he had a personal-best 1,126 yards (88.4 yards per game), and rushed for 8 touchdowns.

Smith sat out the 1991 football season, switching to a track and field scholarship, and posted a personal-best time of 10.24 seconds in the 100 meters for the Buckeyes. He seriously considered transferring to either USC or Stanford in the Pac-10 to play football; Ohio State coach John Cooper had kept the door open for Smith to return to the Buckeyes' football team, and he did in 1992.

== Professional career ==
Pre-draft measurables
Height	Weight	Arm length	Hand span	40-yard dash	10-yard split	20-yard split	20-yard shuttle	Vertical jump	Broad jump	Bench press
6 ft 0 1/4 in (1.84 m)	195 lb (88 kg)	32 3/8 in (0.82 m)	10 1/8 in (0.26 m)	4.47 s	1.56 s	2.59 s	4.03 s	39.0 in (0.99 m)	11 ft 2 in (3.40 m)	16 reps
All values from NFLCombineResults.com

Smith was selected by the Minnesota Vikings in the first round of the 1993 NFL draft, the 21st overall pick. He suffered from a number of ailments in his first few seasons, such as injuries to both knees and ankles along with chicken pox. He finally broke through in 1997 with 1,266 yards rushing. Smith's finest year as a pro came in 2000 at age 28, leading the NFC in rushing with 1,521 yards. Not long after the season ended, it was discovered during a doctor's appointment that he would need surgery on his knee, which would be the third time he would need it in his career. On February 6, 2001, he announced his retirement.

In eight NFL seasons, Smith rushed for 6,818 yards and 32 touchdowns, along with 178 receptions for 1,292 yards and 6 touchdowns, and only nine fumbles. He also returned 1 punt for 4 yards and 19 kickoffs for a total of 460 yards. Smith wore number 20 as a rookie in 1993, but switched to number 26 when it became available in 1994 and wore it until his retirement.

== Records ==
=== NFL ===
- Second all-time Minnesota Vikings record for career rushing yards (6,818). Passed by Adrian Peterson on September 9, 2012. The previous record was 5,887; which was set in 1979 by Chuck Foreman.
- Holds the all-time NFL record for average yards per touchdown run at 27.2

== NFL career statistics ==
Year	Team	Games		Rushing						Receiving					Fumbles	
Year	Team	GP	GS	Att	Yds	Avg	Y/G	Lng	TD	Rec	Yds	Avg	Lng	TD	Fum	FR
1993	MIN	10	2	82	399	4.9	39.9	26	2	24	111	4.6	12	0	–	–
1994	MIN	14	0	31	106	3.4	7.6	14	1	15	105	7.0	15	0	–	–
1995	MIN	9	7	139	632	4.5	70.2	58	5	7	35	5.0	11	0	1	0
1996	MIN	8	7	162	692	4.3	86.5	57	3	7	39	5.6	16	0	2	1
1997	MIN	14	14	232	1,266	5.5	90.4	78	6	37	197	5.3	20	1	0	1
1998	MIN	14	14	249	1,187	4.8	84.8	74	6	28	291	10.4	12	2	1	0
1999	MIN	13	12	221	1,015	4.6	78.1	70	2	24	166	6.9	34	0	1	0
2000	MIN	16	16	295	1,521	5.2	95.1	72	7	36	348	9.7	53	3	4	3
Career		98	72	1,411	6,818	4.8	69.6	78	32	178	1,292	7.3	67	6	9	5

== After retirement ==
Before retirement, Smith made a cameo appearance in the TV series Mystery Science Theater 3000, in Season 8 Episode 3 The Mole People. He played a scantily clad, mute "hunk" given to Pearl (the series' antagonist) as a present by her minions.

Smith retired after only eight seasons in the NFL. He walked away from the game to pursue a career in medicine as well as to avoid any serious injuries. He has maintained a mostly private life since his retirement. He has mainly appeared as a guest on the ESPN news program Outside the Lines, as well FS1 UNDISPUTED as a college football analyst on various ESPN programs alongside regulars Rece Davis, Mark May, and Lou Holtz. Smith also works on the NFL Network as an analyst and has appeared on The Score to discuss the NFL.

Smith is the founder and chairman of Fan Huddle, an on-demand wellness platform featuring content hosted by professional athletes and experts.

In May 2016, Smith left ESPN to work for Fox Sports and is currently an NFL game analyst on Fox Sports, paired with Chris Myers.

Smith founded the Robert Smith Foundation, a charity whose goal is to "provide financial and moral support for Children's hospitals and cancer research."

2004 saw publication of Smith's book The Rest of the Iceberg: An Insider's View on the World of Sport and Celebrity. In it he discussed his background, his time at Ohio State and the NFL, and why he retired. He also analyzed the obsession placed on sports stars by the public.

Smith is an agnostic.

Smith is one of the amateur astronomers featured in science writer Timothy Ferris's 2007 PBS program, Seeing in the Dark, based on his 2002 book of the same name.

On ESPN on November 1, 2013, Smith openly admitted to fighting alcoholism during his playing career during an interview on SportsCenter. He explained he sought counseling and has been sober since the birth of his son, and that his family is his daily motivation to stay sober. He also appeared on ESPN's First Take with Stephen A. Smith and Skip Bayless talking about his alcoholism.

Smith lives in Texas.
