= Dewayne Washington =

American football player (born 1972)

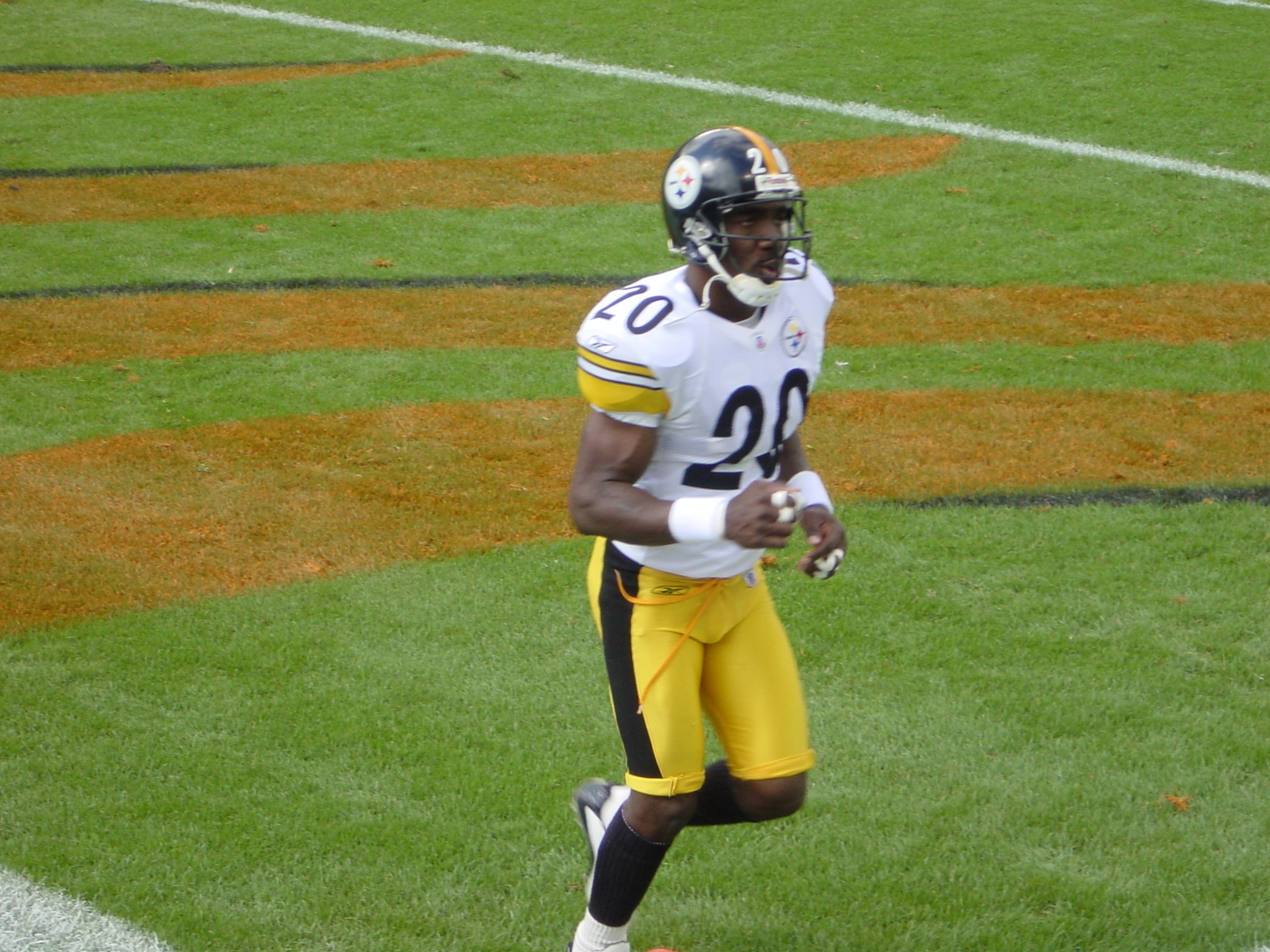
- Washington with the Pittsburgh Steelers in 2002

No. 20, 30
- Position: Cornerback

Personal information
- Born: December 27, 1972 (age 53); Durham, North Carolina, U.S.
- Listed height: 5 ft 11 in (1.80 m)
- Listed weight: 193 lb (88 kg)

Career information
- High school: Northern Durham
- College: NC State
- NFL draft: 1994: 1st round, 18th overall pick

Career history
- Minnesota Vikings (1994–1997); Pittsburgh Steelers (1998–2003); Jacksonville Jaguars (2004); Kansas City Chiefs (2005)

Awards and highlights
- PFWA All-Rookie Team (1994); Second-team All-ACC (1993)

Career NFL statistics
- Total tackles: 807
- Forced fumbles: 2
- Fumble recoveries: 7
- Passes defended: 85
- Interceptions: 31
- Defensive touchdowns: 7
- Stats at Pro Football Reference

Dewayne Neron Washington (born December 27, 1972) is an American former professional football player who was a cornerback in the National Football League (NFL). He played college football for the NC State Wolfpack and was a first-round pick (18th overall) in the 1994 NFL draft. He played in the NFL for the Minnesota Vikings, Pittsburgh Steelers, Jacksonville Jaguars, and Kansas City Chiefs. He is currently the head football coach at Heritage High School in Wake Forest, North Carolina.

== Early life ==
Washington played high school football at Northern High School in Durham, North Carolina, where he earned All-American honors from Sporting News, SuperPrep, and USA Today in 1989. After high school Washington attended North Carolina State University, grabbing three interceptions his junior year. As a senior, Washington led the team with four interceptions, and also recorded 66 tackles (51 solo) as a co-captain.

== Professional career ==
Pre-draft measurables
Height	Weight	Arm length	Hand span	40-yard dash	10-yard split	20-yard split	20-yard shuttle	Vertical jump	Broad jump	Bench press
5 ft 11 1/4 in (1.81 m)	191 lb (87 kg)	32 1/2 in (0.83 m)	9 1/8 in (0.23 m)	4.45 s	1.57 s	2.63 s	4.16 s	36.0 in (0.91 m)	9 ft 10 in (3.00 m)	12 reps
All values from NFL Combine

=== Minnesota Vikings ===
The Minnesota Vikings selected Washington in the first round (18th overall) of the 1994 NFL draft. He was the third cornerback drafted in 1994 and became the fourth highest selected player from NC State in the NFL Draft.

Dewayne Washington started all 16 games for the Minnesota Vikings as a rookie in 1994. Washington recorded 75 tackles (69 solo), and had 3 interceptions for 135 yards and 2 touchdowns as a rookie. Dewayne Washington was named defensive rookie of the year by College and Pro Football Weekly and earned All-Rookie honors from Pro Football Weekly and Pro Football Writers of America. The Vikings won the NFC Central Division with a 10–6 record, but lost in the first round of the 1994 NFL playoffs.

In 1995, Washington played in 15 games, recording 62 total tackles (57 solo), and had 1 interception for 25 yards. Washington only missed 1 game in his career. For the next 10 NFL seasons, he did not miss a game. He played in a total of 191/192 possible regular season games during his 12-year career.

In 1996, Washington recorded 75 tackles (72 solo). He had 2 interceptions for 27 yards and a touchdown that year.

In 1997, he had 84 tackles (74 solo). He had 4 interceptions that year for 71 yards, but no touchdowns. Washington was a starter for a Vikings that entered the 1997 NFL playoffs as a wildcard team, upsetting the New York Giants in the first round before falling to the San Francisco 49ers in the divisional playoffs.

=== Pittsburgh Steelers ===
On February 25, 1998, the Pittsburgh Steelers signed Dewayne Washington as an unrestricted free agent. 1998 proved to be Dewayne's best season in the NFL. In his first season with the Pittsburgh Steelers, Washington had 93 tackles (82 solo). He had 5 interceptions for 178 yards and 2 touchdowns that year. These would be the last interceptions Washington would return for touchdowns in his career.

In 1999, Washington had a career low of 52 tackles (50 solo). However, he did manage to record 4 interceptions.

In 2000, Washington had 78 tackles (70 solo). He matched his career high with 5 interceptions, returning them for 59 yards. On July 19, 2001, the Pittsburgh Steelers re-signed Dewayne Washington to a multi-year contract.

In 2001, he had 77 tackles, but only 1 interception for 15 yards. He helped Steelers win the AFC Central with a 13–3 record, advancing to the AFC Conference Championship, where they were defeated by the New England Patriots.

In 2002, he had only 55 tackles, and a career-low 45 solo tackles. Washington also had 3 interceptions for 51 yards. With a record of 10–5–1, the Steelers lost in the divisional round of the playoffs.

In 2003 Washington began to show signs of aging. That year, he had only 60 tackles (53 solo). He had only 1 interception for the second consecutive year, returning it for only 7 yards. This would be the end of Washington's six-season career in Pittsburgh.

=== Jacksonville Jaguars ===
On February 27, 2004, the Pittsburgh Steelers officially cut Dewayne Washington, making him a free agent eligible to sign with any team. On March 9, 2004, the Jacksonville Jaguars signed Dewayne Washington to be a nickel back. In 2004, Washington had 2 interceptions and 76 Tackles.

=== Kansas City Chiefs ===
In training camp before the 2005 NFL season, the Kansas City Chiefs signed Washington to a one-year contract. Washington's signing was considered less significant due to the possibility of signing Ty Law before he signed with the New York Jets. Dewayne played almost always on special teams, recording 10 tackles, 9 being solo. Despite a 10–6 record that included 4,000 yards passing by Trent Green and 1,700 yards rushing by Larry Johnson, the Chiefs failed to make the playoffs. For the first season in his career, Washington went without an interception and only started one game. In his career, Washington recorded 31 interceptions and recovered 7 fumbles. He returned four interceptions and two fumbles for touchdowns. Washington has started all 8 playoff games he has appeared in.

=== NFL statistics ===
Year	Team	Games	Combined tackles	Tackles	Assisted tackles	Sacks	Forced fumbles	Fumble recoveries	Fumble return yards	Interceptions	Interception return yards	Yards per interception return	Longest interception return	Interceptions returned for touchdown	Passes defended
1994	MIN	16	75	68	7	0.0	0	1	0	3	135	45	81	2	12
1995	MIN	15	62	54	8	0.0	0	0	0	1	25	25	25	0	9
1996	MIN	16	75	69	6	0.0	0	0	0	2	27	14	27	1	12
1997	MIN	16	84	74	10	0.0	0	0	0	4	71	18	27	0	10
1998	PIT	16	93	79	14	0.0	0	1	0	5	178	36	78	2	39
1999	PIT	16	52	50	2	0.0	0	0	0	4	1	0	1	0	18
2000	PIT	16	79	69	10	0.0	0	0	0	5	59	12	31	0	24
2001	PIT	16	77	66	11	1.0	0	1	0	1	15	15	15	0	18
2002	PIT	16	55	45	10	0.0	1	1	0	3	51	17	28	0	17
2003	PIT	16	60	53	7	0.0	0	0	0	1	7	7	7	0	8
2004	JAX	16	76	68	8	0.0	1	0	0	2	0	0	0	0	9
2005	KC	16	13	12	1	0.0	1	1	0	0	0	0	0	0	2
Career		191	801	707	94	1.0	3	5	0	31	569	18	81	5	178

== Coaching career ==
On May 11, 2015, Dewayne was introduced as the new head football coach at Heritage High School in Wake Forest, North Carolina making his head coaching debut on August 21, 2015, against Green Hope High School. Prior to accepting the head coaching job at Heritage, he served as an assistant coach at Ravenscroft School in Raleigh, North Carolina. His assistant coaches included former NFL wide receiver Torry Holt and former NFL running back Willie Parker.

In January 2018, he resigned from the position, wishing to spend more time focusing on his business and family.

== Personal life ==
Since retiring from the NFL, Dewayne has been active within his community. He has participated in various real estate projects which have helped revitalize downtown Durham, NC and started Carolina Skills Academy, a year-round football skills academy available to kids in and around The Triangle. He has also served on the Durham YMCA Board, NC State's Alumni Board and Board of Visitors, and Union Baptist Trustee Board, been involved with the 100 Black Men of America, and volunteered as a coach for Pop Warner football. Currently, Dewayne lives in Raleigh, North Carolina with his wife, NC State graduate Adama Washington, and their three children.
