= Mike Saxon =

American football player (born 1962)

No. 4, 7
- Position: Punter

Personal information
- Born: July 10, 1962 (age 64); Whittier, California, U.S.
- Listed height: 6 ft 3 in (1.91 m)
- Listed weight: 205 lb (93 kg)

Career information
- High school: Arcadia (Arcadia, California)
- College: San Diego State
- NFL draft: 1984: 11th round, 300th overall pick

Career history
- Detroit Lions (1984)*; Arizona Outlaws (1985)*; Dallas Cowboys (1985–1992); New England Patriots (1993); Minnesota Vikings (1994–1995)
- * Offseason or practice squad member only

Awards and highlights
- Super Bowl champion (XXVII); Second-team All-WAC (1983)

Career NFL statistics
- Punts: 813
- Punting yards: 33,887
- Punting average: 41.7
- Stats at Pro Football Reference

Michael Eric Saxon (born July 10, 1962) is an American former professional football player who was a punter in the National Football League (NFL) for the Dallas Cowboys, New England Patriots and Minnesota Vikings. He played college football for the San Diego State Aztecs. He won Super Bowl XXVII with the Cowboys over the Buffalo Bills.

== Early life ==
Saxon attended Arcardia High School, where he played as a wide receiver, defensive back and punter. He also practiced baseball.

After graduation he moved on to Pasadena City College, punting for the 1980 Metropolitan Conference champion. He was a two-time All-Metro Conference selection.

In 1982, he walked-on at San Diego State University and was named the starter at punter. He lost his job after struggling with his production, but regained it in the tenth game of the season against Brigham Young University, setting a school record with an 80-yard punt. He finished the year with a 41.8-yard punting average.

As a senior, he set school records with a 45.5-yard season punting average and a 54.8-yard average in one game (against Brigham Young University). He received honorable-mention All-American and second-team All-WAC honors. He also left with the school record for best career average (44.1-yards).

In 2018, he was inducted into the Pasadena City College Sports Hall of Fame.

== Professional career ==
=== Detroit Lions ===
Saxon was selected by the Detroit Lions in the 11th round (300th overall) of the 1984 NFL draft. He was also selected by the Arizona Wranglers in the 13th round (268th overall) of the 1984 USFL draft. On August 27, he was waived after averaging 43.5-yards per game during the preseason and the team deciding to keep incumbent Mike Black.

=== Arizona Outlaws ===
On October 27, 1984, he signed with the Arizona Outlaws of the United States Football League. He was released on February 11, 1985.

=== Dallas Cowboys ===
In 1985, he was signed as a free agent by the Dallas Cowboys. In the 1970s and early 1980s the Dallas Cowboys had the luxury that they didn't need to carry a punter on their roster, because quarterback Danny White could perform that role at a high level. In order to avoid a potential injury to White, the team kept searching for a replacement until finding Saxon.

His first professional punt was a 57-yarder in the season opener against the Washington Redskins, in a game where he had an average of 48.8-ýards, a net average of 43.3-yards and placed 4 punts inside the opponent's 20-yard line. He finished with a 41.9-yard average, best by a Cowboy in 16 years and by a rookie in franchise history. He also set a franchise playoff record with a 46.9-yard average against the Los Angeles Rams.

In 1986, he registered a 40.7-yard average (despite having a six-yard punt in a game against the Giants on November 2), set a franchise record with 86 punts. He set a club record and led the league with 28 punts inside the opponent's 20-yard line.

In 1987, he established himself as one of the best directional punters in the NFL, by leading the league for a second consecutive season with 20 punts inside the opponent's 20-yard line. In the season opener against the St. Louis Cardinals, he averaged 46-yards per punt, a net average of 40.5-yards had a career-long 63-yarder and placed 4 punts inside the opponent's 20-yard line.

In 1988, he was fourth in the NFC with a 40.9-yard per punt average, was among the league leaders with 24 punts inside the opponent's 20-yard line and became the second player in club history with over 300 career punts.

In 1989, he tallied a 40.9-yard average and was among the league leaders with 19 punts inside the opponent's 20-yard line. He set the second longest streak in club history with 190 punts without a block.

In 1990, he was second in the NFC, fourth in the league and fourth highest in club history, with a career best 43.2-yard average. He tied for fourth on the league with 20 punts inside the opponent's 20-yard line.

In 1991, he had a 42.6-yard average and 16 punts inside the opponent's 20-yard line. He was second in the NFC and tied for fourth in the NFL with a net punting average of 36.8 yards.

In 1992, he was fourth in the NFC with a 43-yard average (fifth in club history). He was a part of the winning team in Super Bowl XXVII, although he suffered a blocked punt in the game, ending a personal streak of 220 punts without a block. He also set the second longest streak in club history with 203 punts without a block. He played in 92 straight games. With 19 punts inside the 20 yard line, he set a club record with 166 career punts downed inside the opponent's 20, which at the time was the NFL-high since he came into the league in 1985. He set the franchise's career record in gross (41.5) and net (34.8) punting averages. He was the second player in franchise history to have two seasons with 43-yard or better gross punting average. In a total of 6 career postseason contests, he averaged 43.5 yards, ranking third in NFL playoff history.

On July 7, 1993, he was released after the team decided to have a training camp battle with young punters, which was won by John Jett. He left with a streak of 92 straight games played.

=== New England Patriots ===
On July 26, 1993, he signed with the New England Patriots and won the starter job over Shawn McCarthy. He averaged 42.4 yards per punt and was named AFC special teams player for week 6, after his game against the Phoenix Cardinals. On August 20, 1994, he was released after the team decided to keep rookie Pat O'Neill.

=== Minnesota Vikings ===
On August 28, 1994, he was signed by the Minnesota Vikings to replace Harry Newsome. In his two years, he averaged 42.9 and 40.9 yards respectively. On August 26, 1996, he was cut in favor of Mitch Berger, who could also handle kickoffs.

== NFL career statistics ==
Legend
	Won the Super Bowl
	Led the league
**Bold**	Career high

=== Regular season ===
Year	Team	Punting									
Year	Team	GP	Punts	Yds	Net Yds	Lng	Avg	Net Avg	Blk	Ins20	TB
1985	DAL	**16**	81	3,396	2,910	57	41.9	35.5	1	20	10
1986	DAL	**16**	**86**	**3,498**	**2,997**	58	40.7	34.4	1	27	10
1987	DAL	12	68	2,685	2,325	63	39.5	34.2	0	20	5
1988	DAL	**16**	80	3,271	2,732	55	40.9	34.2	0	24	**15**
1989	DAL	**16**	79	3,233	2,779	56	40.9	34.3	2	19	6
1990	DAL	**16**	79	3,413	2,815	62	**43.2**	35.6	0	20	8
1991	DAL	**16**	57	2,426	2,095	64	42.6	**36.8**	0	16	5
1992	DAL	**16**	61	2,620	2,043	58	43.0	33.5	0	19	9
1993	NWE	**16**	73	3,096	2,643	59	42.4	34.8	**3**	25	7
1994	MIN	**16**	77	3,301	2,791	**67**	42.9	36.2	0	**28**	5
1995	MIN	**16**	72	2,948	2,382	60	40.9	33.1	0	21	6
Career		172	813	33,887	28,512	67	41.7	34.8	7	239	86

=== Playoffs ===
Year	Team	Punting									
Year	Team	GP	Punts	Yds	Net Yds	Lng	Avg	Net Avg	Blk	Ins20	TB
1985	DAL	1	7	328	251	53	**46.9**	35.9	0	**2**	**2**
1991	DAL	2	8	358	307	52	44.8	**38.4**	0	**2**	1
1992	DAL	**3**	**11**	**445**	**371**	**57**	40.5	30.9	**1**	**2**	1
1994	MIN	1	4	131	130	34	32.8	32.5	0	**2**	0
Career		7	30	1,262	1,059	57	42.1	34.2	1	8	4

== Personal life ==
Saxon has a roofing business and is a co-founder of Servant Energy Partners.
