= John Randle =

American football player (born 1967)

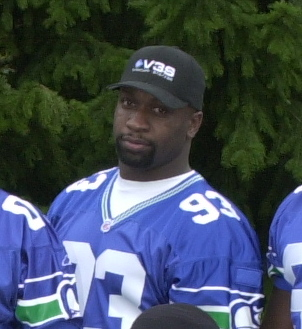
- Randle with the Seattle Seahawks in 2002

No. 93
- Position: Defensive tackle

Personal information
- Born: December 12, 1967 (age 58); Mumford, Texas, U.S.
- Listed height: 6 ft 1 in (1.85 m)
- Listed weight: 290 lb (132 kg)

Career information
- High school: Hearne (Hearne, Texas)
- College: Trinity Valley (1986–1987); Texas A&I (1988–1989)
- NFL draft: 1990: undrafted

Career history
- Minnesota Vikings (1990–2000); Seattle Seahawks (2001–2003)

Awards and highlights
- 6× First-team All-Pro (1993–1998); 7× Pro Bowl (1993–1998, 2001); NFL sacks leader (1997); NFL 1990s All-Decade Team; NFL 100th Anniversary All-Time Team; Minnesota Vikings Ring of Honor; 50 Greatest Vikings; Minnesota Vikings 40th Anniversary Team; First-team NAIA All-American (1988)

Career NFL statistics
- Tackles: 556
- Sacks: 137.5
- Forced fumbles: 29
- Fumble recoveries: 11
- Interceptions: 1
- Defensive touchdowns: 1
- Stats at Pro Football Reference
- Pro Football Hall of Fame
- College Football Hall of Fame

John Anthony Randle (born December 12, 1967) is an American former professional football player who was a defensive tackle for eleven seasons for the Minnesota Vikings and three seasons for the Seattle Seahawks of the National Football League (NFL). He was a six-time first-team All-Pro and seven-time Pro Bowler. Since becoming an official stat in 1982, his 137.5 sacks rank tenth, tied with Richard Dent, and first among defensive tackles. On February 6, 2010, he was voted into the Pro Football Hall of Fame. He played college football for the Trinity Valley Cardinals and the Texas A&I Javelinas, and was signed by the Vikings as an undrafted free agent after the 1990 NFL draft. He is considered one of the greatest undrafted players of all time.

== Early life and college ==
Born in Mumford, Texas, Randle was raised in poverty and worked odd jobs when he was young. His brother Ervin played as a linebacker in the NFL for eight years. Randle played high school football in Hearne, Texas. He started his college playing career at Trinity Valley Community College, before transferring to Texas A&M University–Kingsville.

== Professional career ==
=== Minnesota Vikings ===
Randle went undrafted; he tried out for his brother's team, the Tampa Bay Buccaneers, but at 6'1" and 244 pounds was thought to be too small, and was not signed to a contract. The Vikings picked up Randle after the draft on Head Scout Don Deisch's recommendation. They told Randle he would be picked up only if he came back with his weight over 250, so when he was weighed in he hid a chain under his sweats.

Randle played his first season in 1990. He went to his first Pro Bowl in 1993 after recording 11.5 sacks, and quickly became one of his era's dominant defensive tackles. Once Henry Thomas left the Vikings, Randle increased his training regimen. He recorded double-digit sacks during nine different seasons, including a career-high and league-leading 15.5 in 1997. In a 1999 game against the 49ers, he recorded his only career interception.

Like fellow Minnesota Viking Chris Hovan, Randle was known for eccentric face painting as well as trash-talking on the field, and disarming on-field heckling of opposing players. Among Randle's most famous on-field catchphrases was "Six footers for LIFE!", an allusion to scouting criticism of being undersized for his position.

Randle had an ongoing rivalry with Packers quarterback Brett Favre, whom he sacked more than any other quarterback; Favre said that Randle was the toughest defensive player he faced and that "on artificial turf he's unblockable". To play off the rivalry with Favre, Randle starred in a commercial featuring him sewing a miniature version of Favre's #4 jersey, which he put on a live chicken. The commercial then showed Randle chasing the chicken around what was supposed to be Randle's backyard and ended with him grilling chicken, leading to fierce protests by People for the Ethical Treatment of Animals.

Randle's pass-rushing techniques were motion-captured for 989 Sports's NFL Xtreme series. He was the cover athlete for the second game in the series.

=== Seattle Seahawks ===
At the end of the 2000 season, Randle signed with the Seattle Seahawks. In his first season with the Seahawks, he earned an invite to the Pro Bowl, the last of his career. Randle retired in 2004. He had planned to retire in 2003, but Seahawks coach Mike Holmgren convinced him to stay one more year. The Seahawks made the playoffs in 2003 while he was on the roster, but did not reach the Super Bowl, losing in the Wild Card Round to the Packers. Randle also acquired his final sack in 2003.

Randle left the NFL tied with Richard Dent for fifth in career sacks. His 137.5 sacks remain the second-highest total by a defensive tackle in NFL history, below fellow Vikings legend Alan Page, who had 148.5. Over his career, he was named to seven Pro Bowl squads. He was named All Tackle Machine of 1999 by Tackle: The Magazine.

After retiring, Holmgren said of Randle, "He has more fun than any 10 players I've ever seen. There's the John Randle football player and there's the John Randle that might come up to my office and we'll talk about something. There really are two distinctly different guys, and sometimes in this business you get to see that. For a coach, he just makes things worth it."

== NFL career statistics ==
Year	Team	Games		Tackles				Fumbles	
Year	Team	GP	GS	Cmb	Solo	Ast	Sck	FF	FR
1990	MIN	16	0	21	—	—	1.0	1	0
1991	MIN	16	8	58	—	—	9.5	2	0
1992	MIN	16	14	56	—	—	11.5	0	1
1993	MIN	16	16	59	—	—	12.5	3	0
1994	MIN	16	16	42	30	12	13.5	3	2
1995	MIN	16	16	44	33	11	10.5	1	0
1996	MIN	16	16	46	35	11	11.5	4	0
1997	MIN	16	16	58	47	11	15.5	2	2
1998	MIN	16	16	41	27	14	10.5	3	1
1999	MIN	16	16	38	29	9	10.0	4	3
2000	MIN	16	16	26	25	1	8.0	2	0
2001	SEA	15	14	34	26	8	11.0	4	1
2002	SEA	12	12	15	13	2	7.0	0	0
2003	SEA	16	9	17	12	5	5.5	0	1
Career		219	185	471	277	84	137.5	29	11

== Vikings records ==
- Most seasons leading team in sacks: 9, 1991, 1993–2000
- Most consecutive seasons leading team in sacks: 8, 1993–2000

== After football and legacy ==
Randle was elected to the College Football Hall of Fame and inducted into the Minnesota Vikings Ring of Honor in 2008. He was eligible for the Pro Football Hall of Fame starting in 2009, and was elected in 2010. Randle was inducted in Canton, Ohio, on August 7, 2010, alongside Jerry Rice, Emmitt Smith, Floyd Little, Russ Grimm, Rickey Jackson, and Dick LeBeau. He was also inducted into the Texas Sports Hall of Fame that year and had his number retired by his former high school team. In 2019, Randle was inducted into the Minnesota Sports Hall of Fame. He lives in Medina, Minnesota, with his wife and children.

Randle served as a Minnesota delegate to the 2024 Democratic National Convention.
