= Fuad Reveiz =

American football player (born 1963)

No. 7
- Position: Placekicker

Personal information
- Born: February 24, 1963 (age 63); Bogotá, Colombia
- Listed height: 5 ft 11 in (1.80 m)
- Listed weight: 227 lb (103 kg)

Career information
- High school: Miami Sunset (Miami, Florida, U.S.)
- College: Tennessee
- NFL draft: 1985: 7th round, 195th overall pick

Career history
- Miami Dolphins (1985–1988); San Diego Chargers (1990); Minnesota Vikings (1990–1995)

Awards and highlights
- First-team All-Pro (1994); Pro Bowl (1994); PFW Golden Toe Award (1994); Second-team All-American (1982); First-team All-SEC (1982); Second-team All-SEC (1984)

Career NFL statistics
- Field goals made: 188
- Field goals attempted: 250
- Field goal %: 75.2
- Long field goal: 52
- Stats at Pro Football Reference

Fuad Y. Reveiz (born February 24, 1963) is a Colombian-American former professional football player who was a placekicker for 10 seasons in the National Football League (NFL). He was selected in the seventh round of the 1985 NFL draft by the Miami Dolphins. He also played for the San Diego Chargers and the Minnesota Vikings. He was a Pro Bowl selection in 1994. He played college football for the Tennessee Volunteers from 1981 to 1984, and holds the school record for the longest field goal (60 yards).

== Early life ==
Reveiz was born in Bogotá, Colombia. He moved with his family to Miami, United States, in 1974. Reveiz played for Miami Sunset Senior High. During his sophomore season in 1978, he set a state record with a 60-yard field goal.

== College career ==
Reveiz was not highly recruited out of high school, and originally had planned to attend junior college. However, University of Tennessee coach Johnny Majors, concerned with his kickers' performance during spring practice in 1981, offered Reveiz a scholarship just prior to fall practice. Reveiz connected on 25 of 25 extra point attempts during his freshman year, and was 7 of 15 on field goal tries. He kicked a 51-yard field goal in Tennessee's win over Memphis State, which at the time was the fifth-longest in school history. Two weeks later, he kicked a last-second 28-yard field goal to give Tennessee a 24–21 win over Wichita State. His kickoffs frequently landed in or beyond the end zone.

Reveiz's best season with Tennessee came in 1982, when he was again perfect on extra point attempts, and connected on 27 of 31 field goal tries, including an NCAA-record 8 of 10 on field goal attempts of 50 yards or longer. At one point in the season, he hit 14 consecutive field goals before finally missing one in the rain against Vanderbilt. He hit a school-record 60-yarder in Tennessee's loss to Georgia Tech on October 23, and hit a 52-yarder with less than two minutes to play in the Vols' 24–24 tie against LSU (though he missed a potential game-winner from the same distance). He tied the school single-game record of five field goals in Tennessee's win over Memphis State on November 6, and matched it two weeks later in Tennessee's win over Kentucky. His mark of 27 field goals was second in the nation only to Paul Woodside's record-setting mark of 28.

Reveiz entered the 1983 season a Preseason All-American. He connected on field goals of 45 yards and 47 yards in Tennessee's 20–6 win over LSU, and hit a game-tying 27-yard field goal in the Vols' 41–34 win over Alabama. He missed the first extra point attempt of his career in Tennessee's game against The Citadel, however, and finished the season with 17 field goals on 26 attempts, a considerable drop off from the previous season.

Working with special teams coach George Cafego, Reveiz rebounded with a strong senior season in 1984, hitting 20 field goals on 23 attempts, and connecting on 29 of 30 extra point attempts. At one point in the season, he hit 18 consecutive field goals, which was an SEC record until 2014. He hit the game-winning field goal in Tennessee's 24–21 victory over Georgia Tech on October 27. He was named an All-American by Gannett News, and All-SEC by SouthSports. He competed in the annual Blue–Gray Classic at the end of the season, hitting four field goals in the South's 33–6 victory.

During his career at Tennessee, Reveiz connected on 71 of 95 field goal attempts, and 101 of 103 extra point attempts for a total of 314 points. As of 2012, his success rate of 80% on field goals of 50 yards or more remains an NCAA single-season record, his 18 consecutive field goals remained an SEC record until broken by Georgia's Marshall Morgan in 2014, and his 60-yard field goal against Georgia Tech in 1982 is tied with two others for the SEC record for longest field goal. His 71 career field goals remains a school record, and his 27 field goals in 1982 remains a school single-season record. His career total of 314 points remained a school record until broken by John Becksvoort in the early 1990s.

== Professional career ==
Reveiz was selected by the Miami Dolphins in the seventh round of the 1985 NFL draft. He was the 195th pick overall, and the fourth kicker selected that year. During preseason play prior to the 1985 season, he beat out Uwe von Schamann and Eddie Garcia for the starting job. He connected on 10 of his first 11 attempts, his only miss being a 52-yarder into a strong wind (for which Coach Don Shula took the blame). He hit a game-winning 43-yard field goal against Tampa Bay on October 20, and hit a 47-yarder that would prove to be the difference in the Dolphins' 30–27 win over New England on December 16. He finished 22 of 27 for the season, with three of his misses coming on attempts of 50 yards or more. In February 1986, following his rookie year, he became a U.S. citizen.

Reveiz missed several games during the 1988 season with a pulled thigh muscle. Further injury issues, lingering anger over the way Reveiz's repeated absences in 1988 led to inferior kickers being forced into play and failing in ways that cost Miami several games, and the rise of rookie Pete Stoyanovich led Miami to first place Reveiz on the injured reserve list prior to the 1989 season, and waive him outright a few weeks later. No team signed Reveiz for the 1989 season.

Reveiz signed with the San Diego Chargers in 1990, but hit only 2 of 7 field goal attempts, and was cut after one month. He then signed with the Minnesota Vikings, and quickly revived his career. His 24-yard field goal as time expired gave the Vikings a 24–21 win over Seattle on November 18, 1990. It would be one of seven game-winning field goals Reveiz would kick for the Vikings. He connected on 11 of 12 attempts during his limited first season with the Vikings, breaking the team's single-season record for accuracy. He hit the game-winning field goal as time expired in Minnesota's 6–3 victory over Pittsburgh on December 20, 1992, allowing the Vikings to lock up the NFC Central Division title. Between October 10, 1994, and September 17, 1995, Reveiz connected on 31 consecutive field goal attempts, which at the time was an NFL record. He hit two field goals on two attempts in the NFC's 41–13 loss in the 1995 Pro Bowl.

Consistent pain in his left planting foot forced Reveiz's retirement from professional football prior to the 1996 season.

== NFL career statistics ==
Year	Team	GP	Extra Points			Field Goals				Points
Year	Team	GP	XPM	XPA	XP%	FGM	FGA	FG%	Lng	Points
1985	MIA	16	50	52	96.2	22	27	81.5	49	116
1986	MIA	16	52	55	94.5	14	22	63.6	52	94
1987	MIA	11	28	30	93.3	9	11	81.8	48	55
1988	MIA	11	31	32	96.9	8	12	66.7	45	55
1990	SD	4	7	8	87.5	2	7	28.6	42	13
1990	MIN	9	19	19	100.0	11	12	91.7	45	52
1991	MIN	16	34	35	97.1	17	24	70.8	50	85
1992	MIN	16	45	45	100.0	19	25	76.0	52	102
1993	MIN	16	27	28	96.4	26	35	74.3	51	105
1994	MIN	16	30	30	100.0	34	39	87.2	51	132
1995	MIN	16	44	44	100.0	26	36	72.2	51	122
Career		147	367	378	97.1	188	250	75.2	52	931

== Post-playing career and personal life ==
Reveiz was naturalized as a U.S. citizen in 1986.

After his retirement from the NFL, Reveiz, an ALA Health House Registered Builder, founded a home remodeling company, Reveiz and Co. He is also the host of Weekend Remodeling and other shows on the DIY Network. He currently resides in Knoxville, Tennessee.

Reveiz and his wife, Gail, have three children: Bryanna, Nick and Shane. His son, Nick, played linebacker for the University of Tennessee from 2007 to 2010, and was a captain of the 2009 and 2010 teams. Shane also played linebacker for the Vols, from 2009 to 2011. Fuad's younger brother, Carlos, played kicker for Tennessee from 1984 to 1986.
