= James Manley (American football) =

American football player (born 1974)

No. 75
- Position: Defensive tackle

Personal information
- Born: July 11, 1974 (age 52); Birmingham, Alabama, U.S.
- Listed height: 6 ft 2 in (1.88 m)
- Listed weight: 316 lb (143 kg)

Career information
- High school: Huffman (Birmingham)
- College: Vanderbilt
- NFL draft: 1996: 2nd round, 45th overall pick

Career history
- Minnesota Vikings (1996–1997); St. Louis Rams (1998)*; New England Patriots (1999)*
- * Offseason or practice squad member only

Awards and highlights
- First-team All-SEC (1995)
- Stats at Pro Football Reference

James O. Manley III (born July 11, 1974) is an American former professional football player who was a defensive tackle in the National Football League (NFL). He played college football for the Vanderbilt Commodores. He was selected by the Minnesota Vikings in the second round of the 1996 NFL draft. He played from 1996 to 1997, but did not play in a regular season game his whole career.
