= Tony Bland (American football) =

American football player (born 1972)

No. 84, 16
- Position: Wide receiver

Personal information
- Born: December 12, 1972 (age 53); St. Petersburg, Florida, U.S.
- Listed height: 6 ft 3 in (1.91 m)
- Listed weight: 213 lb (97 kg)

Career information
- High school: Pinellas Park
- College: Florida A&M
- NFL draft: 1996: undrafted

Career history
- Minnesota Vikings (1996–1998); Tampa Bay Buccaneers (1999)*; Minnesota Vikings (1999)*
- * Offseason or practice squad member only
- Stats at Pro Football Reference

Anthony L. Bland (born December 12, 1972) is an American former professional football wide receiver who played for the Minnesota Vikings of the National Football League (NFL). He played college football at Florida A&M University.
