= Greg DeLong =

American football player (born 1973)

No. 85, 83
- Position: Tight end

Personal information
- Born: April 3, 1973 (age 53); Orefield, Pennsylvania, U.S.
- Listed height: 6 ft 4 in (1.93 m)
- Listed weight: 255 lb (116 kg)

Career information
- High school: Parkland (Allentown, Pennsylvania)
- College: North Carolina
- NFL draft: 1995: undrafted

Career history
- Cleveland Browns (1995)*; Minnesota Vikings (1995–1998); Baltimore Ravens (1999); Jacksonville Jaguars (2000)
- * Offseason or practice squad member only

Awards and highlights
- First-team All-ACC (1994)

Career NFL statistics
- Receptions: 43
- Receiving yards: 257
- Receiving touchdowns: 1
- Stats at Pro Football Reference

Gregory Andrew DeLong (born April 3, 1973) is an American former professional football player who was a tight end in the National Football League (NFL). He played college football for the North Carolina Tar Heels.

== Early life and education ==
DeLong was born in Orefield, Pennsylvania. He attended Parkland High School in South Whitehall Township, Pennsylvania and then the University of North Carolina in Chapel Hill, North Carolina, where he played football for the North Carolina Tarheels.

== Professional career ==
DeLong participated in the 1995 NFL draft but was not drafted. He was later signed by the Minnesota Vikings as an undrafted free agent that year and played with the Vikings for four years from the 1995 season through the 1998 season.

After the Vikings, DeLong played for the Baltimore Ravens in the 1999 season and then with the Jacksonville Jaguars in the 2000 season.
