= Brent Novoselsky =

American football player (born 1966)

No. 89, 85
- Position: Tight end

Personal information
- Born: January 8, 1966 (age 60); Skokie, Illinois, U.S.
- Listed height: 6 ft 2 in (1.88 m)
- Listed weight: 232 lb (105 kg)

Career information
- High school: Niles North (Skokie)
- College: Penn
- NFL draft: 1988: undrafted

Career history
- Chicago Bears (1988); Green Bay Packers (1989)*; Minnesota Vikings (1989–1994)
- * Offseason or practice squad member only

Career NFL statistics
- Receptions: 14
- Receiving yards: 108
- Touchdowns: 2
- Stats at Pro Football Reference

Brent Howard Novoselsky (born January 8, 1966) is an American former professional football player who was a tight end in the National Football League (NFL). He played college football for the Penn Quakers.

== Biography ==
Novoselsky, who is Jewish, was born in Skokie, Illinois. He went to Hebrew school at Beth Hillel.

Novoselsky's career highlight took place in the last game of the 1989 NFL season, a must-win Monday Night Football contest for his Minnesota Vikings against the Cincinnati Bengals on Christmas night in 1989. His 1-yard, over-the-shoulder TD grab from Wade Wilson on fourth-and-goal put the Vikings up 29–21 with a little over four minutes left and held up as the game's final score. It was Novoselsky's fourth and final catch of the season. The home win clinched the NFC Central Division for the Vikings over the Green Bay Packers, with whom they shared a 10–6 record (the teams split their regular season games and the Vikings advanced to the NFC playoffs at the expense of the Packers due to a superior division record, 6–2 to 5–3). Minnesota's win also eliminated the 8-8 Bengals and clinched an AFC Wild Card playoff spot for the 9-7 Pittsburgh Steelers.

Novoselsky finished his seven-year NFL career with 14 receptions and two touchdowns.

== See also ==
- List of select Jewish football players
