= Robert Staten =

American football player (born 1969)

No. 33
- Position: Fullback

Personal information
- Born: January 23, 1969 (age 57); Shubuta, Mississippi, U.S.
- Listed height: 5 ft 11 in (1.80 m)
- Listed weight: 240 lb (109 kg)

Career information
- High school: Quitman (MS)
- College: Jackson State
- NFL draft: 1993: undrafted

Career history
- Minnesota Vikings (1993)*; New England Patriots (1993)*; Minnesota Vikings (1993–1995)*; Tampa Bay Buccaneers (1996)
- * Offseason or practice squad member only
- Stats at Pro Football Reference

Robert Staten (born January 23, 1969) is an American former football running back. He played for the Tampa Bay Buccaneers in 1996.
