= James Harris (defensive end) =

American football player (born 1968)

No. 99, 93
- Position: Defensive end

Personal information
- Born: May 13, 1968 (age 58); East St. Louis, Illinois, U.S.
- Listed height: 6 ft 6 in (1.98 m)
- Listed weight: 266 lb (121 kg)

Career information
- High school: East St. Louis
- College: Temple
- NFL draft: 1992: undrafted

Career history
- Seattle Seahawks (1992)*; Minnesota Vikings (1992–1995); St. Louis Rams (1996); Oakland Raiders (1998–1999)
- * Offseason or practice squad member only

Career NFL statistics
- Tackles: 124
- Sacks: 9.5
- Interceptions: 1
- Stats at Pro Football Reference

James Edward Harris (born May 13, 1968) is an American former professional football player. He was a defensive end for six seasons in the National Football League (NFL) for the Minnesota Vikings, St. Louis Rams, and Oakland Raiders. He played college football for the Temple Owls.

== Football career ==
Harris was a quarterback at East St. Louis High School. He attended Temple University and mostly played tight end during his first 2 years before moving to defense as a linebacker. He blocked nine kicks during his college career.

Harris was not drafted out of college in the 1992 NFL draft but was signed by the Seattle Seahawks as a free agent, and then was cut during training camp. He then signed with the Minnesota Vikings to their practice but was injured for the entire 1992 season. In 1993 he backed up Chris Doleman at defensive end for the Vikings but was only active for 6 games, playing mostly on special teams. Doleman signed with the Atlanta Falcons prior to the 1994 and Harris became the starting defensive end for the Vikings. In 1995 he was coming off two foot surgeries during the offseason from an injury suffered in 1994 and suffered an ankle injury later in the 1995 season. He did not play as well as in 1994, and he spent most of the season as a backup. He was cut by the Vikings after the 1995 season.

Harris signed with the St. Louis Rams prior to the 1996 season. After playing all 16 games for the Rams as a backup in 1996, he was cut during the 1997 preseason. After missing the entire 1997 season, he signed with the Oakland Raiders for the 1998 season and became the Raiders' starting defensive end. He also started for the Raiders at defensive end in 1999, playing one game at defensive tackle against the Buffalo Bills in order to take advantage of Harris' ability to deflect passes against the Bills' short quarterback Doug Flutie. Although he deflected 12 passes during 1999, a very high total for a defensive lineman, he only had 2 1/2 sacks, and felt that the Raiders would not want to re-sign him after the season. He proved correct as the Raiders chose not to re-sign him.

== Personal life ==
On December 30, 1995, Harris was arrested in Eden Prairie, Minnesota on charges of assaulting a woman who was reported to be his wife. He pleaded guilty to third degree assault on January 25, 1996 and received a non-custodial sentence. He later said that he and his wife forgave each other for the incident.
