= William Sims (American football) =

American football player (born 1970)

No. 57
- Position: Linebacker

Personal information
- Born: December 30, 1970 (age 55); Frankfurt, West Germany
- Listed height: 6 ft 3 in (1.91 m)
- Listed weight: 258 lb (117 kg)

Career information
- High school: Brooks County (Quitman, GA)
- College: Southwestern Louisiana
- NFL draft: 1993: undrafted
- Expansion draft: 1995: 26th round, 62nd overall pick

Career history
- Minnesota Vikings (1993–1994); Carolina Panthers (1995)*; New Orleans Saints (1996–1997)*
- * Offseason or practice squad member only
- Stats at Pro Football Reference

William Alfred Sims (born December 30, 1970) is a German former professional football player who was a linebacker in the National Football League (NFL).

Sims was born in Frankfurt, West Germany. He attended Brooks County High School in Quitman, Georgia and played collegiate football at the University of Southwestern Louisiana.

Sims was signed by the Minnesota Vikings as an undrafted free agent and spent the 1993 season on their practice squad. He dressed for eight games during the 1994 season as a special teams contributor. The Carolina Panthers selected Sims as their 26th pick in the 1995 NFL expansion draft, but he did not make the team.
