= Carlos Jenkins =

American football player (born 1968)

No. 51
- Position: Linebacker

Personal information
- Born: July 12, 1968 (age 58); Palm Beach, Florida, U.S.
- Listed height: 6 ft 3 in (1.91 m)
- Listed weight: 217 lb (98 kg)

Career information
- College: Michigan State
- NFL draft: 1991: 3rd round, 65th overall pick

Career history
- Minnesota Vikings (1991–1994); St. Louis Rams (1995–1996)

Awards and highlights
- First-team All-Big Ten (1990)

Career NFL statistics
- Sacks: 9
- Interceptions: 4
- Touchdowns: 1
- Stats at Pro Football Reference

Carlos Edward Jenkins (born July 12, 1968) is an American former professional football player who was a linebacker in the National Football League (NFL). He played six seasons for the Minnesota Vikings (1991–1994) and the St. Louis Rams (1995–1996).

== Career ==
Jenkins played for the Michigan State Spartans between 1987 and 1990. During his final two years at Michigan State, Jenkins made five interceptions, returning for an average of 7.0 yards per interception.

Jenkins was selected to the Minnesota Vikings during the third round of the 1991 NFL draft. In his rookie season with the Minnesota Vikings in 1991, Jenkins made one interception, returning it for the single touchdown of his career. During the 1993 NFL season, the Vikings' defensive coordinator, Tony Dungy, remarked that Jenkins was "on his way to becoming an outstanding outside linebacker".

In 1995, the St. Louis Rams signed Jenkins as a free agent to replace linebacker Joe Kelly. At the time, head coach Rich Brooks complimented Jenkins on his "youth, speed and NFL experience", characterizing him as a "big-play production guy and an impact hitter".

In 1997, Jenkins joined the San Francisco 49ers, but was waived.

== Personal life ==
An only child, Jenkins was raised in Florida, where his mother worked for IBM.

In early 1993, while in Tampa, Florida, Jenkins suffered a motorcycle accident. According to Jenkins, he had been riding his Suzuki 1100 without a helmet at approximately seventy miles an hour when a displaced manhole cover caused him to fly off his motorcycle. The accident resulted in friction burns on fifteen percent of his body. "Things had been moving so fast and I lived fast," remarked Jenkins after the accident. "The accident brought everything to a halt."
