= Andrew Jordan (American football) =

American football player (born 1972)

No. 83, 89, 48, 49, 85
- Position: Tight end

Personal information
- Born: June 21, 1972 (age 54); Charlotte, North Carolina, U.S.
- Listed height: 6 ft 6 in (1.98 m)
- Listed weight: 263 lb (119 kg)

Career information
- High school: West Charlotte (NC)
- College: Western Carolina
- NFL draft: 1994: 6th round, 179th overall pick

Career history
- Minnesota Vikings (1994–1997); Tampa Bay Buccaneers (1997); Philadelphia Eagles (1998); Minnesota Vikings (1999–2001)

Awards and highlights
- PFWA All-Rookie Team (1994)

Career NFL statistics
- Receptions: 100
- Receiving yards: 772
- Touchdowns: 4
- Stats at Pro Football Reference

Andrew Jordan Jr. (born June 21, 1972) is an American former professional football player who was a tight end in the National Football League (NFL) for eight seasons for the Minnesota Vikings, the Philadelphia Eagles, and the Tampa Bay Buccaneers. He played college football at North Greenville University and Western Carolina University and was selected in the sixth round of the 1994 NFL draft with the 179th overall pick.
