= Chris Foerster =

American football coach (born 1961)

San Francisco 49ers
- Title: Assistant head coach, Offensive line coach

Personal information
- Born: October 12, 1961 (age 65)

Career information
- College: Colorado State

Career history
- Colorado State (1982–1987); Graduate assistant (1982); Offensive line coach (1983–1987); Stanford (1988–1991) Assistant offensive line & special teams coach; Minnesota (1992) Offensive line coach; Minnesota Vikings (1993–1995) Tight ends coach & assistant offensive line coach; Tampa Bay Buccaneers (1996–2001) Offensive line coach; Indianapolis Colts (2002–2003) Tight ends coach; Miami Dolphins (2004) Offensive coordinator; Baltimore Ravens (2005–2007) Offensive line coach; San Francisco 49ers (2008–2009) Offensive line coach; Washington Redskins (2010–2014) Offensive line coach; San Francisco 49ers (2015) Offensive line coach; Miami Dolphins (2016–2017) Offensive line coach; San Francisco 49ers (2019–present); Game-planning assistant (2019–2020); Offensive line coach (2021); Run game coordinator & offensive line coach (2022–2024); Assistant head coach & offensive line coach (2025–present)
- Coaching profile at Pro Football Reference

Christopher Flyn Foerster (born October 12, 1961) is an American professional football coach who is the assistant head coach and offensive line coach for the San Francisco 49ers of the National Football League (NFL). Previously, he worked for the Dolphins as their offensive coordinator in 2004.

== Coaching career ==
Foerster was hired by the San Francisco 49ers on February 15, 2008, as the co-offensive line coach. He assumed the title of offensive line coach in week 8 of the 2008 season.

Prior to joining the 49ers, Foerster spent three years (2005–07) as the offensive line coach and assistant head coach for the Baltimore Ravens. Foerster has also served as the offensive coordinator for the Miami Dolphins (2004), tight ends coach for the Indianapolis Colts (2002–03), offensive line coach for the Tampa Bay Buccaneers (1996–2001) and assistant offensive line/tight ends coach for the Minnesota Vikings (1993–95).

With a total of 34 years coaching experience, Foerster also made an impact in the collegiate ranks, serving as the offensive line coach for the University of Minnesota (1992), assistant offensive line & special teams coach for Stanford (1988–91) and offensive line coach for Colorado State (1983–87). He began his coaching career in 1982 as a graduate assistant at Colorado State after a successful career with the Rams as a center from 1979 to 1982. Foerster originally joined the Rams football team as a walk-on before earning a scholarship as a sophomore.

Foerster resigned from the Miami Dolphins on October 9, 2017, after video surfaced of him snorting cocaine.

On August 23, 2019, it was reported that Foerster was hired by the San Francisco 49ers as an assistant coach to help game-planning as a member of Kyle Shanahan's staff. The hire was not formally announced nor was Foerster featured on the 49ers' website. Foerster and Shanahan are close friends who previously worked together in Washington. In 2021, Foerster was promoted to offensive line coach. In 2022, after Niners offensive/run game coordinator Mike McDaniel left to become the head coach of the Miami Dolphins, Foerster was promoted to McDaniel's former position of run game coordinator. In 2025, Foerster was promoted to assistant head coach. After Shanahan was involved in a car accident in July 2026, Foerster took over head coaching duties for the start of training camp until his recovery.
