= John Gerak =

American football player (born 1970)

No. 46, 66
- Position: Guard

Personal information
- Born: January 6, 1970 (age 56); Youngstown, Ohio, U.S.
- Listed height: 6 ft 3 in (1.91 m)
- Listed weight: 290 lb (132 kg)

Career information
- High school: Struthers (OH)
- College: Penn State
- NFL draft: 1993: 3rd round, 57th overall pick

Career history
- Minnesota Vikings (1993–1996); St. Louis Rams (1997)

Career NFL statistics
- Games played: 63
- Games started: 35
- Fumble recoveries: 1
- Stats at Pro Football Reference

John Matthew Gerak (born January 6, 1970) is an American former professional football player who was a guard for five seasons with the Minnesota Vikings and the St. Louis Rams of the National Football League (NFL). He was selected by the Vikings in the third round of the 1993 NFL Draft with the 57th overall pick.
