= Trent Walters =

American football player and coach (born 1943)

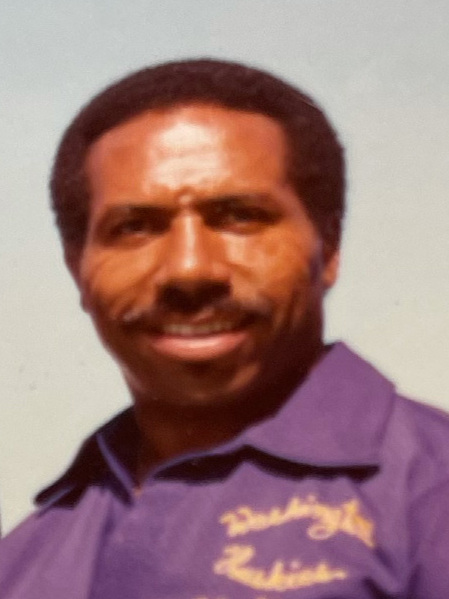
- Trent Walters

Profile
- Position: Running back

Personal information
- Born: November 20, 1943 (age 82); Knoxville, Tennessee, U.S.

Career information
- High school: Austin (TN)
- College: Indiana (1962–1965)
- NFL draft: 1966: undrafted

Career history

Playing
- Edmonton Eskimos (1966–1967)

Coaching
- Indiana (1968–1971) Assistant; Louisville (1972) Secondary coach; Indiana (1973–1980) Secondary coach; Washington (1981–1983) Secondary coach; Cincinnati Bengals (1984) Secondary coach; Pittsburgh (1985) Secondary coach; Louisville (1986–1990) Secondary coach; Texas A&M (1991–1993) Secondary coach; Minnesota Vikings (1994–1999) Outside linebackers; Minnesota Vikings (2000) Linebackers; Minnesota Vikings (2001) Defensive assistant; Notre Dame (2002–2003) Secondary coach; Philadelphia Eagles (2004–2007) Secondary coach

Trent Walters (born November 20, 1943) is a retired American football coach and Canadian football player who played for the Edmonton Eskimos of the Canadian Football League. He is the father of retired NFL player and current Cincinnati Bengals wide receivers coach Troy Walters.

== Playing career ==
Walters lettered from 1963 to 1965 during his time with the Indiana Hoosiers football team. He played professionally in the CFL with the Edmonton Eskimos from 1966 to 1967. In his career, Walters ran for 821 yards in his career on 164 attempts, scoring 5 rushing touchdowns. He also caught 21 passes for 158 yards.

== Coaching career ==
Walters coached collegiately for 27 seasons and in the National Football League for 13 seasons with three different NFL franchises, the Cincinnati Bengals, Minnesota Vikings, and Philadelphia Eagles.

=== Minnesota Vikings ===
Walters spent eight seasons on Dennis Green’s Minnesota Vikings staff, the first six as outside linebackers coach, 2000 as inside linebackers coach and 2001 as a defensive assistant. He helped the Vikings to NFL playoff berths in six of his first seven years with the club, culminating in a 15-1 season in 1998 and a 1998 NFC Championship Game appearance.

=== Philadelphia Eagles ===
In Walters' first season with the Eagles, the team appeared in Super Bowl XXXIX after losing in the NFC Championship Game the three previous seasons. Walters coached multiple Pro Bowlers in his four seasons with the franchise, including Brian Dawkins (2004–06) Michael Lewis (2004), and Lito Sheppard (2004, 2006). Dawkins and Sheppard were both First-team All-Pros in 2004, Dawkins achieved the honor again in 2006 under Walters.
