= Pete Bercich =

American football player and coach (born 1971)

No. 56, 50
- Position: Linebacker

Personal information
- Born: December 23, 1971 (age 54); Joliet, Illinois, U.S.
- Listed height: 6 ft 1 in (1.85 m)
- Listed weight: 240 lb (109 kg)

Career information
- High school: Providence Catholic (New Lenox, Illinois)
- College: Notre Dame
- NFL draft: 1994: 7th round, 211th overall pick

Career history

Playing
- Minnesota Vikings (1994–2000)

Coaching
- Minnesota Vikings (2002) Quality control; Minnesota Vikings (2003) Assistant defensive line; Minnesota Vikings (2004) Assistant linebackers; Minnesota Vikings (2005) Linebackers; Hill-Murray School (2016–2020) Head coach

Career NFL statistics
- Games played: 57
- Games started: 2
- Tackles: 33
- Fumble recoveries: 1
- Stats at Pro Football Reference

Peter James Bercich (born December 23, 1971) is an American former professional football player who was a linebacker for the Minnesota Vikings of the National Football League (NFL). He played college football for the Notre Dame Fighting Irish. He was selected by the Vikings in the seventh round of the 1994 NFL draft with the 211th overall pick. He played five seasons for the NFL's Vikings (1995–2000). After his playing days were over he spent 5 years as a Vikings' defensive assistant. He has served as the color commentator on the Vikings Radio Network since 2007. To date, his career highlight in radio broadcasting (by his own admission) was subbing for Dan "The Common Man" Cole on KFAN-AM 1130 in Minneapolis – Saint Paul on October 14, 2008. In May 2016, Bercich was hired as the head football coach at Hill-Murray School.

Pre-draft measurables
Height	Weight	Arm length	Hand span	40-yard dash	10-yard split	20-yard split	20-yard shuttle	Vertical jump	Broad jump	Bench press
6 ft 1 3/8 in (1.86 m)	240 lb (109 kg)	31 1/2 in (0.80 m)	9 1/8 in (0.23 m)	4.96 s	1.71 s	2.87 s	4.04 s	29.0 in (0.74 m)	9 ft 0 in (2.74 m)	19 reps
