= Vencie Glenn =

American football player (born 1964)

No. 25, 29
- Position: Safety

Personal information
- Born: October 26, 1964 (age 62); Grambling, Louisiana, U.S.
- Listed height: 6 ft 0 in (1.83 m)
- Listed weight: 192 lb (87 kg)

Career information
- High school: John F. Kennedy (Glenmont, MD)
- College: Indiana State
- NFL draft: 1986: 2nd round, 54th overall pick

Career history
- New England Patriots (1986); San Diego Chargers (1986–1990); New Orleans Saints (1991); Minnesota Vikings (1992–1994); New York Giants (1995)

Career NFL statistics
- Interceptions: 35
- INT yards: 544
- Touchdowns: 2
- Stats at Pro Football Reference

Vencie Leonard Glenn (born October 26, 1964) is an American former professional football player who was a safety in the National Football League (NFL). He was selected by the New England Patriots in the second round of the 1986 NFL draft. He played college football for the Indiana State Sycamores. He was a two-year starter at Kennedy High in Silver Spring, Maryland.

== College career ==
Glenn had a stellar career at Indiana State University; a two-time All-Conference safety, he was awarded the 1985 Missouri Valley Conference "Player of the Year (Defense)" and was named All-American by the AFCA. A ball-hawking safety, he still holds the ISU record for career interceptions (17), notching 2 vs. #6 Eastern Illinois in the 1983 playoffs.

In 1984, he was 4th in the Missouri Valley Conference in Interceptions (6) and 2nd in Interception Return Yardage (126).

He participated in the 1986 Senior Bowl and was invited to the Blue–Gray Football Classic.

== Professional career ==
Glenn also played for the San Diego Chargers, New Orleans Saints, Minnesota Vikings, and New York Giants.

Glenn intercepted 35 passes during his career; he ranks #25 on the San Diego Chargers career interceptions list (12 INTs); he is currently tied at #18 (14 INTs) on the Minnesota Vikings career interceptions list. Glenn is the record holder for longest interception return in Chargers history, after scoring on a 103-yard return against the Denver Broncos in 1987. This return is the third-longest in NFL history; it was the longest ever at the time until Ed Reed broke the record in 2004 and again in 2008.

He led the NFL in 'Interception Return Yardage' in 1987 with 166 yards.
