= Fernando Smith =

American football player (born 1971)

No. 95, 96, 92
- Position: Defensive end

Personal information
- Born: August 2, 1971 (age 55); Flint, Michigan, U.S.
- Listed height: 6 ft 6 in (1.98 m)
- Listed weight: 284 lb (129 kg)

Career information
- High school: Flint Northwestern
- College: Jackson State
- NFL draft: 1994: 2nd round, 55th overall pick

Career history
- Minnesota Vikings (1994–1997); Jacksonville Jaguars (1998); Baltimore Ravens (1999); Minnesota Vikings (2000)*; St. Louis Rams (2000); Minnesota Vikings (2000); Carolina Panthers (2002)
- * Offseason or practice squad member only

Career NFL statistics
- Total tackles: 161
- Sacks: 20
- Forced fumbles: 5
- Fumble recoveries: 7
- Stats at Pro Football Reference

Fernando Smith (born August 2, 1971) is an American former professional football player who was a defensive end in the National Football League (NFL). He is from Flint, MI and graduated from Flint Northwestern High School and then Jackson State University in 1994.

He was selected in the second round of the 1994 NFL draft with the 55th overall pick by the Minnesota Vikings. He played 4 seasons for the Vikings, and then one season each for the Jacksonville Jaguars, Baltimore Ravens, and St. Louis Rams before retiring in 2001.
