= David Palmer (American football) =

American football player (born 1972)

No. 22
- Positions: Wide receiver, return specialist

Personal information
- Born: November 19, 1972 (age 53); Birmingham, Alabama, U.S.
- Listed height: 5 ft 8 in (1.73 m)
- Listed weight: 180 lb (82 kg)

Career information
- High school: P.D. Jackson-Olin (Birmingham)
- College: Alabama
- NFL draft: 1994: 2nd round, 40th overall pick

Career history
- Minnesota Vikings (1994–2000)

Awards and highlights
- Consensus national championship (1992); Paul Warfield Award (1993); Consensus All-American (1993); First-team All-SEC (1993)

Career NFL statistics
- Receptions: 73
- Receiving yards: 631
- Return yards: 4,884
- Total touchdowns: 5
- Stats at Pro Football Reference

David Lee Palmer (born November 19, 1972) is an American former professional football player who was a wide receiver and return specialist for seven seasons with the Minnesota Vikings of the National Football League (NFL). He played college football for the Alabama Crimson Tide. Palmer was a member of the 1992 Alabama team that won a national championship, and he earned consensus All-American honors in 1993. He was selected by the Vikings in the second round of the 1994 NFL draft.

== Early life ==
Palmer was born in Birmingham, Alabama. He attended P.D. Jackson-Olin High School in Birmingham, where he was the star quarterback and played a variety of other positions for the Mustang high school football team.

== College career ==
While attending the University of Alabama, Palmer played for the Alabama Crimson Tide football from 1991 to 1993, where he wore jersey No. 2 and earned the nickname "The Deuce." He was recruited to play wide receiver, but his athletic abilities permitted him to fill a variety of roles. He often took snaps directly under center and ran to the right side of the line, making him one of the first "wildcat" quarterbacks. Palmer became the team's first 1,000-yard receiver in a single season. Following his junior season, Palmer was recognized as a consensus first-team All-American and was a finalist for the Heisman Trophy, for which he finished third in the voting.

He caught 102 passes in three seasons for 1,611 yards, a 15.8-yard average per attempt, with 11 touchdowns. He rushed 86 times for 598 yards and a touchdown, averaging 7 yards per carry. He completed 15 of 20 passes for 260 yards, an average of 13 yards per catch, with two touchdowns and three interceptions. He returned 83 punts for 865 yards and four touchdowns and ran back 36 kickoffs for 841 yards.

Due to an injury during the Iron Bowl, Palmer chose not to return to Tuscaloosa for his final season of college eligibility, and turned pro after the 1993 season.

== Professional career ==
Palmer was a second-round pick (40th overall) for the Minnesota Vikings in the 1994 NFL draft. Palmer spent seven seasons (1994–2000) in the NFL, all with the Vikings. His career highlights include leading the league in punt returns during the 1995 season. For his career he returned two punts and one kickoff for touchdowns, as well as one rushing and one receiving.
