= Dave Garnett =

American football player (born 1970)

No. 54, 52
- Position: Linebacker

Personal information
- Born: December 6, 1970 (age 55); Pittsburgh, Pennsylvania, U.S.
- Listed height: 6 ft 2 in (1.88 m)
- Listed weight: 219 lb (99 kg)

Career information
- High school: Naperville North (Naperville, Illinois)
- College: Stanford (1989–1992)
- NFL draft: 1993: undrafted

Career history
- Minnesota Vikings (1993–1994); Carolina Panthers (1995)*; Denver Broncos (1995); Minnesota Vikings (1996)
- * Offseason or practice squad member only

Career NFL statistics
- Tackles: 34
- Fumble recoveries: 3
- Stats at Pro Football Reference

David Eugene Garnett (born December 6, 1970) is an American former professional football player who was a linebacker for four seasons in the National Football League (NFL) with the Minnesota Vikings and Denver Broncos. He played college football for the Stanford Cardinal football.

== Early life ==
David Eugene Garnett was born on December 6, 1970, in Pittsburgh, Pennsylvania. He attended Naperville North High School in Naperville, Illinois.

== College career ==
Garnett was a four-year letterman for the Stanford Cardinal from 1989 to 1992. He appeared in ten games, starting five, as a freshman in 1989 and posted 51 tackles. He was third on the team in tackles with 65 in 1990 and earned honorable mention All-Pac-10 recognition. In 1991, he was second on the Cardinal in tackles with 64 and missed one game due to a fractured thumb, earning honorable mention All-Pac-10 honors for the second straight season.

== Professional career ==
After going undrafted in the 1993 NFL draft, Garnett signed with the Minnesota Vikings on May 4, 1993. He played in all 16 games for the Vikings during his rookie year in 1993, recording 11 tackles. He also appeared in one playoff game that season. He played in nine games during the 1994 season, totaling five solo tackles, two assisted tackles, two fumble recoveries, and one kick return for no yards.

Garnett was selected by the Carolina Panthers in the 1995 NFL expansion draft. He was released on May 22, 1995.

He signed with the Denver Broncos on May 31, 1995. He was released on August 22 but later re-signed on October 3. He played in three games for the Broncos during the 1995 season, recording two solo tackles and one assisted tackle, before being released again on October 24, 1995.

Garnett was signed by the Vikings again on February 26, 1996. He appeared in 12 games, starting four, in 1996, totaling eight solo tackles, five assisted tackles, and one fumble recovery. He became a free agent after the season.
