= Mike Morris (long snapper) =

American football player and coach (born 1961)

Current position
- Title: Strength and conditioning coach
- Team: Concordia–St. Paul
- Conference: NSIC

Biographical details
- Born: February 22, 1961 (age 65); Centerville, Iowa, U.S.
- Education: Northeast Missouri State University

Playing career
- 1979–1982: Northeast Missouri State
- 1983: Michigan Panthers
- 1984: Arizona Outlaws
- 1986: Denver Broncos (Note: Offseason and/or practice squad member only)
- 1987–1988: St. Louis / Phoenix Cardinals
- 1989: Kansas City Chiefs
- 1989: New England Patriots
- 1990: Seattle Seahawks
- 1990: Cleveland Browns
- 1991–1999: Minnesota Vikings
- Position: Long snapper

Coaching career (HC unless noted)
- 2011–present: Concordia–St. Paul (S&C)

Mike Morris (born February 22, 1961) is an American former professional football player who was a long snapper in the National Football League (NFL) for 14 seasons. He played college football for the Northeast Missouri State Bulldogs. He also played in the United States Football League (USFL) for two seasons. He currently serves as the strength and conditioning coach at Concordia University, St. Paul.

== Playing career ==
Morris was a four-year starter at Northeast Missouri State (now known as Truman State University), and entered the National Football League as an undrafted free agent. He played brief stints for the St. Louis/Phoenix Cardinals, the Kansas City Chiefs, the New England Patriots, the Seattle Seahawks, and the Cleveland Browns before settling in as the long snapper for the Minnesota Vikings, where he played at a high level consistently throughout the 1990s.

== Coaching career ==
On July 28, 2011, Morris was hired as the Strength and conditioning coach at the Concordia University, St. Paul.

== Broadcasting ==
Following the end of his football career, Morris took over the morning drive time slot on sports radio station KFAN. Morris broadcast using the moniker 'Superstar Mike Morris.' His show was known as The Power Trip Morning Show, and every show had a common theme ending with a tribute to a particular soldier and a thanks to the soldiers of the US armed forces. 'The Power Trip Morning Show' continues to air as of July 2020 with other local personalities (and no longer features the traditional ending). Morris was also the co-host of Vikings Fanline, adding his thoughts (as a former NFL player) after games, often including banter and strong opinions with live callers over the radio airwaves.

In 2001, Morris was offered the position of Minnesota Vikings radio play by play announcer by KFAN after Lee Hamilton was fired after one preseason game. Morris's hiring, however, was vetoed by the Vikings & the job was given to Terry Stembridge Jr.

On September 9, 2013, Morris and co-host Bob Sansevere started "Mike & Bob Afternoons" on WGVX 105 The Ticket. Sansevere later got his own time slot, Morris teamed with co-host Ben Holsen on a new show called "Radioactive Sports". The format for both shows was Minnesota sports talk. 105 The Ticket later changed its format thus eliminating all local programming and ending Radioactive Sports.

Morris appeared on ESPN1500 in Minneapolis during the Mackey & Judd show. He is generally on Mondays and Fridays, and also hosts Viking Ventline for the station. Morris is the owner of a physical conditioning studio in Burnsville, Minnesota, the "MILO Barbell Company". He was released from the station as part of broader layoffs in August 2018. Today, Morris is a weekly contributor to the JimBob Sports Jamboree on Bob FM and hosts his own podcast Star Struck with The Superstar Mike Morris.

== See also ==
- Career Statistics
- Power Trip Morning Show
- Concordia University, St.Paul
