= Ownership of the Minnesota Vikings =

The Minnesota Vikings are a professional American football team based in Minneapolis. They compete in the National Football League (NFL) as a member club of the National Football Conference (NFC) North division. The Vikings have been owned by Zygi Wilf and members of the Wilf family since 2005. He purchased the team from Red McCombs, who had owned it since 1998. Between 1960 and 1998, the Vikings were owned by various syndicates. From 1984 to 1991, control of the team was fought over by two ownership groups - one led by Carl Pohlad and Irwin L. Jacobs and the other by general manager Mike Lynn.

== Boyer, Winter, and Skoglund ==
In 1959, Bill Boyer, Max Winter, and H. P. Skoglund were awarded the Minneapolis-St. Paul franchise in the new American Football League. In an effort to fight back against the new league, Chicago Bears owner George Halas proposed adding Dallas and Houston to the NFL. However, the ownership group for the proposed Houston franchise backed out after they were unable to find a suitable stadium, which led Boyer's group to withdraw from the AFL and apply for an NFL franchise. On January 28, 1960, Minneapolis was awarded an expansion franchise that would begin playing in 1961.

The Vikings first ownership group, Minnesota Pro Football, Inc. (later renamed Minnesota Vikings Football Club, Inc.), had three major shareholders (Bill Boyer, Max Winter, H. P. Skoglund) and two minor shareholders (Northwest Publications Inc. and Ole Haugsrud). In 1970, Boyer transferred his stock to a trust. When he died in 1973 his son-in-law, John Steele, succeeded him as an officer and director of the Vikings.

In 1977 the NFL instituted a rule which barred publicly held corporations from having substantial ownership of a franchise. This forced Northwest Publications to sell its stock, which was purchased by Winter and Skoglund. This gave Winter and Skoglund 350 voting shares each, while the Boyer estate held 200 shares and Haugsrud's trustees held the remaining 100.

In 1978, ownership was transferred to another corporation, Vikings II, Inc., for tax purposes. The shares held by Haugsrud's trustees were bought out and voting stock in the new corporation was equally divided between Winter, the Skoglund estate, and the Boyer trustees. Max Winter, John Steele Jr., John Skoglund, Sheldon Kaplan, and Mike Lynn were elected directors of Vikings II. Winter was elected president, Steele was vice president, Skoglund was treasurer, and Kaplan was the secretary.

== Purchase by Pohlad and Jacobs and legal disputes ==
In 1984, Winter reached an agreement to sell his shares to PJ Acquisition Corp., a company formed by Carl Pohlad and Irwin L. Jacobs. The sale was challenged by the Skoglund and Boyer heirs, however, in 1986 Judge O. Harold Odland ruled that two right-of-first-refusal agreements were invalid because they were not properly ratified by trustees of the Boyer estate. On July 17, 1986, the National Football League owners approved the sale of Winter's stock to Pohlad and Jacobs. On September 7, 1986, Pohlad and Jacobs purchased 87 shares of nonvoting stock from David Weiner, which gave the pair a majority interest in the Vikings, but not control of the team. On May 27, 1987, the Minnesota Supreme Court declined to rehear the case.

On May 29, 1987, Lynn and Minnesota businessmen Wheelock Whitney Jr. and Jaye F. Dyer purchased the majority of voting stock owned by the Boyer estate. On July 29, 1987, the team's board of directors was expanded from five to nine members. Jacobs, Pohlad, Whitney, Dyer were added to the board and Winter, Lynn, Kaplan, Skoglund, and Steele were reelected. On September 4, 1987, the board of directors voted 6 to 3 to remove Winter as team president and replace him with Whitney.

== Sale by Pohlad and Jacobs ==
In 1989, Lynn and his partners bought out most of the stock owned by the Boyer and Skoglund estates, however Lynn and his group did not ask the NFL ownership to approve its purchase due to ongoing litigation from Pohlad and Jacobs. On July 26, 1991, NFL commissioner Paul Tagliabue and the league finance committee informed Lynn that the league would not approve his group's ownership of the Vikings unless it had one general partner who owned 60% of the group's stock or 30% of all of the club's stock. On December 16, 1991, Lynn, Whitney and Dyer's group purchased Pohlad and Jacobs' shares for $50 million. Two months later, Lynn's stake in the team was purchased by the club's other partners.

The new ownership group consisted of:

- Roger Headrick, former Exxon and Pillsbury executive and friend and neighbor of Mike Lynn who took over the team's daily operations when Lynn became president of the World League of American Football in 1991.
- John C. Skoglund, insurance businessman and heir of H. P. Skoglund
- Jaye F. Dyer, founder of Dyco Petroleum
- Philip S. Maas, son-in-law of team founder Bill Boyer
- James H. Binger, former president and chairman of Honeywell
- N. Bud Grossman, CEO of Cogel Management and co-founder of Dyco Petroleum
- James R. Jundt, manager of an investment-management firm
- Elizabeth MacMillan, wife of Cargill CEO Whitney MacMillan
- Carol S. Sperry, heir of H. P. Skoglund
- Wheelock Whitney Jr., former executive at Dain Bosworth

== Failed sale to Tom Clancy and purchase by McCombs ==
On October 28, 1997, vice chairman and part owner Philip Maas announced that the team was up for sale. The bidders for the team were reported to be team president Roger Headrick, former owner Carl Pohlad, San Antonio businessman Red McCombs, and Philadelphia Flyers chairman Ed Snider. On February 3, 1998, co-owner James Jundt announced that author Tom Clancy would purchase the team for $200 million. On May 20, 1998, Clancy withdrew his offer to buy the team to better position himself in his divorce proceedings. On July 2, 1998, Red McCombs agreed to purchase the Vikings for $250 million - beating out a $220 million bid from Minnesota Timberwolves owner Glen Taylor.

== Failed sale to Reggie Fowler and purchase by Zygi Wilf ==
In February 2005, Vikings owner Red McCombs agreed to sell the team to Arizona-based entrepreneur Reggie Fowler. Fowler would have been the first minority owner of an NFL franchise. However, he was unable to prove that his finances were sound enough to complete the purchase, and his application to buy the team was rejected by the league. He brought in various partners, including New York-based real estate developer Zygi Wilf, who took over as the lead owner, with Fowler as one of the minor partners. The deal to install Wilf as owner was concluded in May 2005. By October 2014, Fowler was no longer a limited partner of the Minnesota Vikings.
