= List of Minnesota Vikings head coaches =

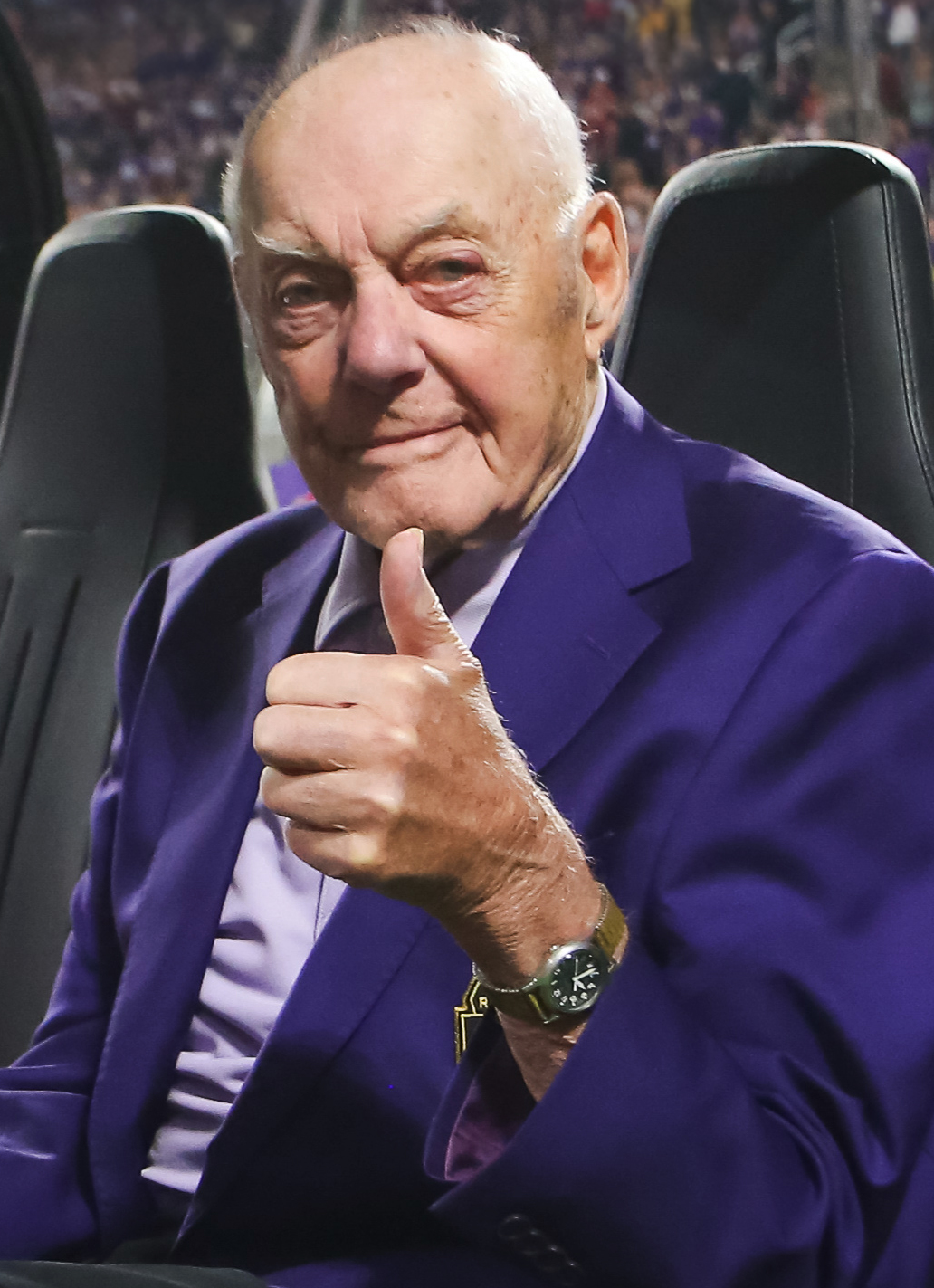
Bud Grant was head coach of the Minnesota Vikings from 1967 to 1983 and 1985.

The Minnesota Vikings are a professional American football team based in Minneapolis, Minnesota. The Vikings are members of the North Division of the National Football Conference in the National Football League (NFL). The club was founded by Minneapolis businessmen Bill Boyer, H. P. Skoglund and Max Winter in 1959 as a member of the American Football League. However, they forfeited their membership in January 1960 and became the National Football League's 14th franchise in 1961.

There have been ten head coaches in the history of the franchise, beginning with Norm Van Brocklin, who was head coach for six seasons between 1961 and 1967. Van Brocklin's successor, Bud Grant, is the only coach to have had more than one tenure with the franchise, and also the only one to have won an NFL championship with the team, at the 1969 NFL Championship Game. Grant is the all-time leader in games coached (243), wins (151), and winning percentage (.620). Les Steckel has the worst winning percentage of the franchise's ten head coaches (.188), with just three wins in his only season in charge. Two Vikings coaches have been inducted into the Pro Football Hall of Fame: Grant and Van Brocklin, although Van Brocklin was elected for his playing career. Mike Tice is the only former Vikings player to have become a head coach for the franchise. Dennis Green was the first African American head coach in franchise history. Former defensive coordinator Leslie Frazier, who took over as interim head coach from Brad Childress after the latter was fired on November 22, 2010, was the team's head coach from January 3, 2011, until December 30, 2013, when he was fired after compiling a 21–32–1 record as head coach. On January 15, 2014, the Vikings appointed Mike Zimmer as the team's ninth head coach. He served for eight years until being fired on January 10, 2022, compiling a 72–56–1 record with the team. Two days after he helped the Los Angeles Rams to victory in Super Bowl LVI as their offensive coordinator, the Vikings signed Kevin O'Connell to be their 10th head coach in team history.

== History ==
Following the Minnesota Vikings' admission to the National Football League, there were ultimately two candidates for the position of head coach: Philadelphia Eagles quarterback Norm Van Brocklin and Winnipeg Blue Bombers head coach Bud Grant. Van Brocklin was favored by three of the Vikings' five board members, and after discussions with the franchise management on January 18, Van Brocklin signed an initial three-year contract and was appointed as head coach on January 18, 1961. In Van Brocklin's first season in charge of the Vikings, the team won just three of their 14 games, a record that got worse before it got better. The team had a record of 2–11–1 in Van Brocklin's second season as head coach, but improved to 8–5–1 in the 1964 season. However, this was not enough to reach the NFL Championship Game as the team finished tied for second place in the Western Conference.

By Van Brocklin's final season at the helm, his relationship with starting quarterback Fran Tarkenton had deteriorated to the point that the two could no longer work together. This resulted in Van Brocklin's resignation on February 11, 1967, shortly followed by Tarkenton being traded to the New York Giants. In the search for Van Brocklin's replacement, Vikings founder Max Winter and general manager Jim Finks re-approached Bud Grant, who joined the Minnesota side on March 10, 1967, after 10 seasons coaching the Winnipeg Blue Bombers. With a record of 8–6, the Vikings finished top of their division in Grant's second season in charge, reaching the playoffs for the first time in franchise history. However, they lost out to the Baltimore Colts 24–14 in their Western Conference Championship Game. The following year, they went two better by beating the Los Angeles Rams and the Cleveland Browns to claim the NFL Championship, before losing out to the Kansas City Chiefs 23–7 in Super Bowl IV. Nine more divisional titles followed in the next 11 seasons, including NFC Championships in 1973, 1974 and 1976, making Grant the first head coach to lead a team to four Super Bowls, although he won none of them.

Grant retired as head coach after the 1983 season, and was replaced by receivers coach Les Steckel in January 1984. However, under Steckel, the team had their worst season since 1962, only managing to win three of their 16 games in 1984. After Steckel was fired, Grant was coaxed out of retirement to replace him for the 1985 season. After Grant's second retirement, Vikings assistant coach Jerry Burns was named as his successor. Burns' tenure as head coach lasted for six seasons, including three playoff appearances, one of which resulted in a loss to the Washington Redskins in the 1987 NFC Championship Game.

Burns retired from coaching at the end of the 1991 season, and the Vikings turned to Stanford Cardinal head coach Dennis Green as his successor, making Green the first African American head coach in franchise history. In the first nine years of Green's tenure with the Vikings, the closest he came to a losing record was an 8–8 record in 1995, the only season in which his team missed the playoffs. Three years later, Green's team played out the best season in franchise history, losing only to the Tampa Bay Buccaneers on the way to a 15–1 record. The team received a bye to the Divisional Playoffs, in which they beat the Arizona Cardinals to set up a Conference Championship Game against the Atlanta Falcons. With six minutes left in the fourth quarter and the Vikings in the lead at 27–20, they drove down the field to set up a 38-yard field goal for kicker Gary Anderson, who had not missed a single kick all season. A successful kick would have given the Vikings a two-score lead with just over two minutes left to play, but Anderson hooked his kick wide left, allowing the Falcons to take the ball back downfield for a game-tying touchdown. They followed this with a field goal in overtime, denying the Vikings a fifth Super Bowl appearance.

Green's 10th season at the Vikings helm turned out to be his final year in Minnesota; with a 5–10 record with one game remaining in the 2001 season, the Vikings management bought out the final two years of Green's contract and promoted offensive line coach and former tight end Mike Tice to the top job for the final game of the season. Tice remained in the job for a further four seasons, but only reached the playoffs once, losing out to the Philadelphia Eagles in the Divisional Playoffs of the 2004 season. Tice's contract was allowed to expire at the end of the 2005 season, and he was quickly replaced by Eagles offensive coordinator Brad Childress. After Childress' first season in charge, the Vikings' regular season record improved by two wins a season from 6–10 in 2006 to 12–4 in 2009. They reached the playoffs as NFC North champions in consecutive years in 2008 and 2009; they lost out to Childress' former team, the Eagles, in the 2008 NFC Wildcard game, but beat the Dallas Cowboys in the 2009 Divisional game to reach their first NFC Championship Game since 2000. However, they lost to the New Orleans Saints and missed out on the Super Bowl. The following season, the Vikings picked up just three wins in their first 10 games; after the seventh defeat of the season, Childress was fired and defensive coordinator Leslie Frazier took over as interim head coach. Frazier was named head coach on a permanent basis on January 3, 2011, but his first full season in charge saw the Vikings finish with a 3–13 record. The following year saw a dramatic turnaround as the Vikings finished at 10–6 in 2012, just edging out the Chicago Bears to make the playoffs as the NFC's sixth seed with a win over the Green Bay Packers in week 17; however, the team slumped again in 2013, as a final 5–10–1 record ultimately saw Frazier fired on December 30, 2013.

On January 15, 2014, the Vikings announced the hiring of the Cincinnati Bengals' defensive coordinator Mike Zimmer as head coach, and in his first year at the helm, the team finished at 7–9, just missing the playoffs. The Vikings again improved to 11–5 in 2015, beating the Packers in week 17 to win the NFC North for the first time since 2009 and snapping a streak of five consecutive titles by Green Bay; however, they went on to lose to the Seattle Seahawks in the wildcard round of the playoffs. After going 5–0 to start the 2016 season (which was their first season in their newly completed U.S. Bank Stadium) despite a slew of injuries, the team won just three games after their bye week and finished 8–8. In 2017, Zimmer led the team to a 13–3 record and a first-round bye on the way to the NFC Championship Game against the Eagles, who won 38–7, leaving the Vikings just short of becoming the first team ever to reach a Super Bowl played in their own stadium. Zimmer's Vikings posted back-to-back losing seasons in 2020 and 2021, and on January 10, 2022, he was fired with a record of just three playoff appearances and two division titles in his eight seasons with the team. Los Angeles Rams offensive coordinator Kevin O'Connell was appointed as Zimmer's replacement in February 2022, shortly after helping the Rams to victory in Super Bowl LVI.

== Head coaches ==
GC	Games coached
W	Wins
L	Losses
T	Ties
Win%	Win percentage
*†	Elected into the Pro Football Hall of Fame as a coach

Note: Statistics are correct as of the end of the 2025 NFL season.

List of Minnesota Vikings head coaches
# (Note: A running total of the number of coaches of the Vikings. Thus, any coach who has two or more terms as head coach is only counted once.)	Image	Name	Seasons (Note: Each year is linked to an article about that particular NFL season.)			Regular season					Playoffs				Overall					Accomplishments	Ref.
#	Image	Name	Total	First	Last	GC	W	L	T	Win%	GC	W	L	Win%	GC	W	L	T	Win%	Accomplishments	Ref.
1	Norm Van Brocklin	Norm Van Brocklin	6	1961	1966	84	29	51	4	.369	—				84	29	51	4	.369		
2	Bud Grant wearing a cap	Bud Grant^{†} (Note: Grant's full coaching record with the Vikings is 259 regular season games coached with a record of 158–96–5 and a winning percentage of .620. He is also 10–12 (.455) in 22 playoff games.)	17	1967	1983	243	151	87	5	.632	22	10	12	.455	265	161	99	5	.617	Inducted Pro Football Hall of Fame (1994); 1 NFL Championship (1969); 3 NFC Championships (1973, 1974, 1976); 11 NFC Central titles (1968, 1969, 1970, 1971, 1973, 1974, 1975, 1976, 1977, 1978, 1980); AP Coach of the Year (1969); Pro Football Weekly Coach of the Year (1969); Sporting News Coach of the Year (1969); UPI NFL Coach of the Year (1969)	
3		Les Steckel	1	1984		16	3	13	0	.188	—				16	3	13	0	.188		
–	Bud Grant wearing a cap	Bud Grant^{†}	1	1985		16	7	9	0	.438	—				16	7	9	0	.438		
4	Jerry Burns wearing a suit and tie, holding a piece of paper	Jerry Burns	6	1986	1991	95	52	43	0	.547	6	3	3	.500	101	55	46	0	.545	1 NFC Central title (1989)	
5		Dennis Green	10	1992	2001 (Note: With a losing record (5–10) for the first time in ten seasons with the franchise, the Vikings bought out the last two years of Dennis Green's contract with a game remaining in the 2001 season. Assistant coach Mike Tice took over for the final game of the season. Tice was named head coach on a permanent basis on January 10, 2002.)	159	97	62	0	.610	12	4	8	.333	171	101	70	0	.591	4 NFC Central titles (1992, 1994, 1998, 2000); UPI NFC Coach of the Year (1992)	
6	Mike Tice wearing a T-shirt, cap and sunglasses	Mike Tice	5	2001	2005	65	32	33	0	.492	2	1	1	.500	67	33	34	0	.493		
7	Brad Childress wearing glasses and a headset	Brad Childress	5	2006	2010 (Note: After 10 games of the 2010 season, with the Vikings at 3–7, Childress was fired as head coach and replaced by assistant head coach Leslie Frazier for the remaining six games. Frazier was named head coach on a permanent basis on January 3, 2011.)	74	39	35	0	.527	3	1	2	.333	77	40	37	0	.519	2 NFC North titles (2008, 2009)	
8	Leslie Frazier wearing a cap and sunglasses	Leslie Frazier	4	2010	2013	54	21	32	1	.398	1	0	1	.000	55	21	33	1	.391		
9	Mike Zimmer wearing a cap and sunglasses on top of his head	Mike Zimmer	8	2014	2021	129	72	56	1	.562	5	2	3	.400	134	74	59	1	.556	2 NFC North titles (2015, 2017)	
10		Kevin O'Connell*	4	2022 – present		68	43	25	0	.632	2	0	2	.000	60	43	27	0	.614	1 NFC North title (2022)	
