= Mike Lynn =

American football executive

Personal information
- Born: May 18, 1936; Scranton, Pennsylvania, U.S.
- Died: July 21, 2012 (aged 76); Oxford, Mississippi, U.S.

Career history
- 1972: Memphis Pros (president)
- 1974: Minnesota Vikings (assistant to the owner)
- 1975–1990: Minnesota Vikings (executive vice president and general manager)
- 1990–1991: World League of American Football (president)
- 1990–1992: Minnesota Vikings (executive vice president)
- 1991–1992: Minnesota Vikings (minority owner)

Awards and highlights
- 1976 NFC Champions

Michael Lynn III (May 18, 1936 – July 21, 2012) was an American football general manager and executive. He served as the general manager of the National Football League's Minnesota Vikings from 1975 to 1990.

== Early life ==
Lynn's father died of a brain tumor when Lynn was 12 years old and he delivered papers, ushered in a movie theatre, and worked in a box factory to help support his family. Raised in Rockaway, New Jersey, he graduated from Morris Hills High School in 1955. He attended Pace University, but dropped out after less than a year.

At the age of 17, Lynn was the manager of a drive-in movie theater owned by Walter Reade, becoming the youngest person in the chain's history to serve as manager of a theater. After a stint in the United States Army, Lynn was again worked for Reade as assistant to the general manager of his movie distribution company. After Reade's death, Lynn managed movie theaters in Delaware and Memphis, Tennessee. He then worked as an executive with Corondolet, a Memphis-based chain of department stores.

== Memphis ==
From 1966 to 1974, Lynn was President of Mid South Sports, Inc., a group that sought to acquire a National Football League franchise for Memphis. Lynn also served as President of the Memphis Pros of the American Basketball Association in 1972.

== Minnesota Vikings ==
=== General manager ===
In 1974, Lynn was hired by the Minnesota Vikings as an assistant to the owner. He was named general manager in 1975 by Vikings president Max Winter following the departure of GM Jim Finks. Although Lynn was the general manager, head coach Bud Grant had the final say on personnel. After Grant's first retirement, Lynn signed a contract that gave him total authority to run the team and a raise to $300,000 a year and $1 million in deferred compensation.

The Vikings went to one Super Bowl and won four Division Championships during Lynn's first four years with the team and made a total of ten playoff appearances in his sixteen years as general manager. He was also instrumental in the construction of the Hubert H. Humphrey Metrodome and bringing Super Bowl XXVI to the city. For his work on the Metrodome, Lynn negotiated a deal that gave him 10% of the luxury suite revenue for every event ever held at the stadium.

After the 1985 season, Winter attempted to fire Lynn, claiming that the 1984 agreement that gave him control of the team was signed "under duress". In 1986, Winter sold his stake in the team to Carl Pohlad and Irwin L. Jacobs, setting up a battle between Pohlad and Jacobs, who owned a majority of the team's shares, and the heirs of Winter's co-founders Bill Boyer and H. P. Skoglund, who held a majority of voting stock, for control of the Vikings. On May 29, 1987, Lynn and Minnesota businessmen Wheelock Whitney Jr. and Jaye F. Dyer purchased the majority of voting stock owned by the Boyer estate. On September 3, 1987, the Vikings board of directors fired Winter. In 1989, Lynn and his partners bought out most of the stock owned by the Boyer and Skoglund estates, however the group did not ask the NFL ownership to approve its purchase due to ongoing litigation from fellow owners Carl Pohlad and Jacobs.

In 1989, Lynn was a leader in a group of NFL owners that blocked Jim Finks' appointment as commissioner. The job ultimately went to Paul Tagliabue.

In 1989, thinking that the Vikings were a big-time running back away from being a great team, he dealt what eventually turned into 5 players and 8 draft picks to the Dallas Cowboys in exchange for running back Herschel Walker. The three 1st round and three 2nd round picks eventually netted the Cowboys Emmitt Smith, Darren Woodson, and Russell Maryland and three Super Bowl rings. On the Vikings' side, Walker gained 148 yards rushing on 18 carries in his first game, but averaged less than 81 yards a game for the other 26 games.

== WLAF ==
In 1990, Lynn was named president of the World League of American Football. He resigned as Vikings general manager, but retained his ownership stake and the title of executive vice president. Lynn resigned as WLAF president on August 3, 1991, after less than one year on the job.

== Departure from Vikings ==
On July 26, 1991, NFL commissioner Paul Tagliabue and the league finance committee informed Lynn that the league would not approve his group's ownership of the Vikings unless it had one general partner who owned 60% of the group's stock or 30% of all of the club's stock. On December 16, 1991, Lynn, Whitney and Dyer's group purchased Pohlad and Jacobs' shares for $50 million. However, two months later, Lynn's stake in the team was purchased by the club's other partners, ending his involvement with the team.

== Later life and death ==
In 1983, Lynn purchased Walter Place in Holly Springs, Mississippi. The Lynns fulfilled the ambition of former Walter Place owner Oscar Johnson by building a walking park with water features and botanical gardens on an adjacent piece of property. They also acquired Featherston Place and Polk Place. Lynn died on July 21, 2012, at Baptist Memorial Hospital – North Mississippi in Oxford, Mississippi.

Preceded by Tex Schramm	World League of American Football President; 1990–1991	Succeeded by None
