= Roger Headrick =

American business executive (born 1936)

President and CEO of the Minnesota Vikings
- In office January 1, 1991 – August 21, 1998
- Preceded by: Wheelock Whitney Jr.
- Succeeded by: Gary Woods

CFO of the Pillsbury Company
- In office February 15, 1982 – January 31, 1989
- Preceded by: Walter D. Scott
- Succeeded by: Paul S. Walsh

Personal details
- Born: Roger Lewis Headrick; May 13, 1936 (age 89) West Orange, New Jersey, U.S.
- Spouse: C. Lynn Cowell
- Children: 4
- Education: Williams College (BA); Columbia Business School (MBA)

Roger Lewis Headrick (born May 13, 1936) is an American business executive who served as president of the Minnesota Vikings of the National Football League from 1991 to 1998.

== Early life ==
Headrick was born on May 13, 1936, in West Orange, New Jersey. He earned a bachelor's degree in history and literature from Williams College in 1958 and received a master's in business administration from the Columbia Business School in 1960. In 1962 he married C. Lynn Cowell, daughter of Harrington Park, New Jersey mayor E. J. H. Cowell. They had four children.

== Business career ==
Headrick began his business career as a financial analyst with Esso Standard Eastern, the Far East affiliate of the Standard Oil Company of New Jersey. In 1965 he became the treasurer of Esso Standard Sekiyu K.K. He returned to Esso Standard Eastern in 1968 as assistant treasurer and assistant manager for financial planning. From 1970 to 1973 he was the vice president of Esso Philippines Inc. From 1973 to 1978 he was the treasurer and manager for financial planning at Esso Eastern Inc. In 1978 he was named deputy controller of Exxon.

In 1982, Headrick was named executive vice president and chief financial officer of the Pillsbury Company. He remained with the company until its purchase by Grand Metropolitan in 1989. Later that year he founded an investment company with former First Bank executive William F. Farley and became CEO of ProtaTek International, a small company that manufactures animal vaccines.

== Minnesota Vikings ==
In 1989, Headrick was part of a ten-person group formed by his friend and neighbor Mike Lynn that purchased controlling interest in the Minnesota Vikings. When Lynn left the Vikings in 1991 to become president of the World League of American Football, Headrick was elected president and chief executive officer and took over daily operations of the team. Headrick was heavily involved in all aspects of the organization, which led to comparisons to Jerry Jones and George Steinbrenner. Although he had final say on personnel moves, he delegated to head coach Dennis Green, whom he hired to succeed the retired Jerry Burns as head coach in 1992, and vice president Jeff Diamond, due to his lack of football knowledge.

During Headrick's tenure as president, the Vikings rebuilt from the Herschel Walker trade and became a consistent playoff team. He approved the aggressive pursuit of free agents, which led to the signing of Felix Wright. However, after the 1995 season, which saw newcomers Rick Cunningham, Chris Hinton, and Broderick Thomas underperform, the team became more selective with its free agent signings.

After a heated argument between Headrick and Gary Zimmerman over the offensive lineman's contract, Zimmerman vowed to retire before playing another game for the Vikings. Zimmerman was traded to the Denver Broncos for three draft picks that were used to select Dewayne Washington, Andrew Jordan, and Orlando Thomas.

Following multiple disappointing playoff performances, there were reports that owners Wheelock Whitney Jr. and Jaye F. Dyer had spoken with their friend, outgoing Notre Dame head coach Lou Holtz, about taking the Vikings job. Headrick, however, publicly backed Green. On January 10, 1997, the Vikings board of directors voted 6 to 4 to retain Green. Green and Headrick had a falling out after the 1997 season after Headrick blocked offensive coordinator Brian Billick and defensive coordinator Foge Fazio from interviewing for other coordinator positions and refused to extend Green or his assistants contract while the team was still up for sale. Billick resigned to become offensive coordinator of the Dallas Cowboys, but commissioner Paul Tagliabue ruled that he could not take the job while still under contract with the Vikings.

On October 28, 1997, vice chairman and part-owner Philip Maas announced that the team was up for sale. Headrick worked with a group led by Alabama surgeon Larry Lemak that would allow him to be a limited partner and remain the team's chief executive officer if they purchased the team. On February 2, 1998, the board of directors accepted a $200 million bid from author Tom Clancy. Headrick claimed he had the right of first refusal under the Vikings ownership bylaws and matched Clancy's offer. On March 19, 1998, commissioner Paul Tagliabue ruled Headrick did not have the right to match Clancy's offer. Headrick chose not to challenge Tagliabue's ruling. On May 20, 1998, Clancy withdrew his offer to buy the team to better position himself in his divorce proceedings. Headrick again attempted to purchase the team on July 2, 1998, but Red McCombs agreed to buy the Vikings for $250 million. McCombs did not want to retain Headrick and he resigned as team president on August 21, 1998.

== Other work ==
Since leaving the Vikings, Headrick has served as CEO of ProtaTek International, managing general partner of HMCH Ventures, a venture capital firm, and was a director of Chemtura. He was also a longtime director of Caremark International. When the company merged with CVS Corporation to form CVS Caremark in 2007, Headrick and fellow Caremark director C.A. Lance Piccolo's nominations to the new board were opposed by Institutional Shareholder Services and CtW Investment Group. Headrick was elected to the board but received the largest number of votes cast against him and resigned after two months.
