= Tim Irwin =

American football player (born 1958)

No. 76, 78
- Position: Offensive tackle

Personal information
- Born: December 13, 1958 (age 67); Memphis, Tennessee, U.S.
- Listed height: 6 ft 7 in (2.01 m)
- Listed weight: 300 lb (136 kg)

Career information
- High school: Central (Knoxville, Tennessee)
- College: Tennessee
- NFL draft: 1981: 3rd round, 74th overall pick

Career history
- Minnesota Vikings (1981–1993); Miami Dolphins (1994); Tampa Bay Buccaneers (1994)

Awards and highlights
- 50 Greatest Vikings; Minnesota Vikings 40th Anniversary Team; First-team All-SEC (1980); Second-team All-SEC (1979)

Career NFL statistics
- Games played: 201
- Games started: 187
- Fumble recoveries: 8
- Stats at Pro Football Reference

Timothy Edward Irwin (born December 13, 1958) is an American former professional football player who was an offensive tackle in the National Football League (NFL). He played college football for the Tennessee Volunteers and played in the National Football League (NFL) for 14 years. Most of his professional career was with the Minnesota Vikings.

In 1990, he earned his J.D. degree and was admitted to the Tennessee bar. In 2000, he opened his own law office in Knoxville, Tennessee, where he practiced in the field of criminal defense, juvenile justice, personal injury and sports law. In 2005, he was appointed Judge of the Juvenile Court for Knox County, along with former NFL linebacker Ron McCartney.

Irwin was also a co-founder of the Catholic Youth Football League in Knoxville. The league allows children who do not have a school team to play on a faith-based team and compete together against schools in the area.

== Tim Irwin/Food City Bass Tournament ==
Since 1987, Irwin has sponsored the Tim Irwin/Food City Bass Tournament held in Lenoir City, Tennessee. Proceeds from the tournament benefit the Boys & Girls Clubs of the Tennessee Valley and has raised over $1 million since 1990. In recognition of his efforts, Irwin was inducted into the Boys & Girls Clubs of America Alumni Hall of Fame on May 14, 2009, in Atlanta, Georgia.
