= List of Minnesota Vikings broadcasters =

The Minnesota Vikings' flagship radio station is KFXN-FM. The games are also heard on the "Vikings Radio Network" in Minnesota, Wisconsin, Iowa, South Dakota, and North Dakota, as well as many other outlets. Paul Allen has been the play-by-play announcer since the 2002 NFL season and Pete Bercich is the analyst, who began his first season in 2007.

WCCO was the flagship station from 1961 to 1969. Dick Enroth was the original announcer, succeeded by Ray Christensen. KSTP (AM) held the rights from 1970 to 1975. WCCO again from 1976 to 1984. KSTP (FM) 1985–1987. WCCO 1988–1990. KFAN 1991–1995. WCCO 1996–2000. KFAN (KFXN-FM) since 2001.

After Jim Morse called the 1970 games, Joe McConnell was the radio play by play announcer 1971–76, 1985–87. Joe Starkey was the radio play by play announcer 1977. Ray Scott was the radio play by play announcer 1978–82. Tim Moreland was the radio play by play announcer 1983–84. Brad Nessler was the radio play by play announcer 1988–89. John Carlson was the play by play announcer 1990. Dan Rowe was the radio play by play announcer 1991–2000. Terry Stembridge, Jr. was the radio play by play announcer 2001.

Telecasts of preseason games not shown on national networks are aired on KMSP-TV (Channel 9) in the Twin Cities with Paul Allen doing play-by-play as well.
