= Minnesota Vikings =

NFL team in Minneapolis, Minnesota

- Current season
Logo	Wordmark
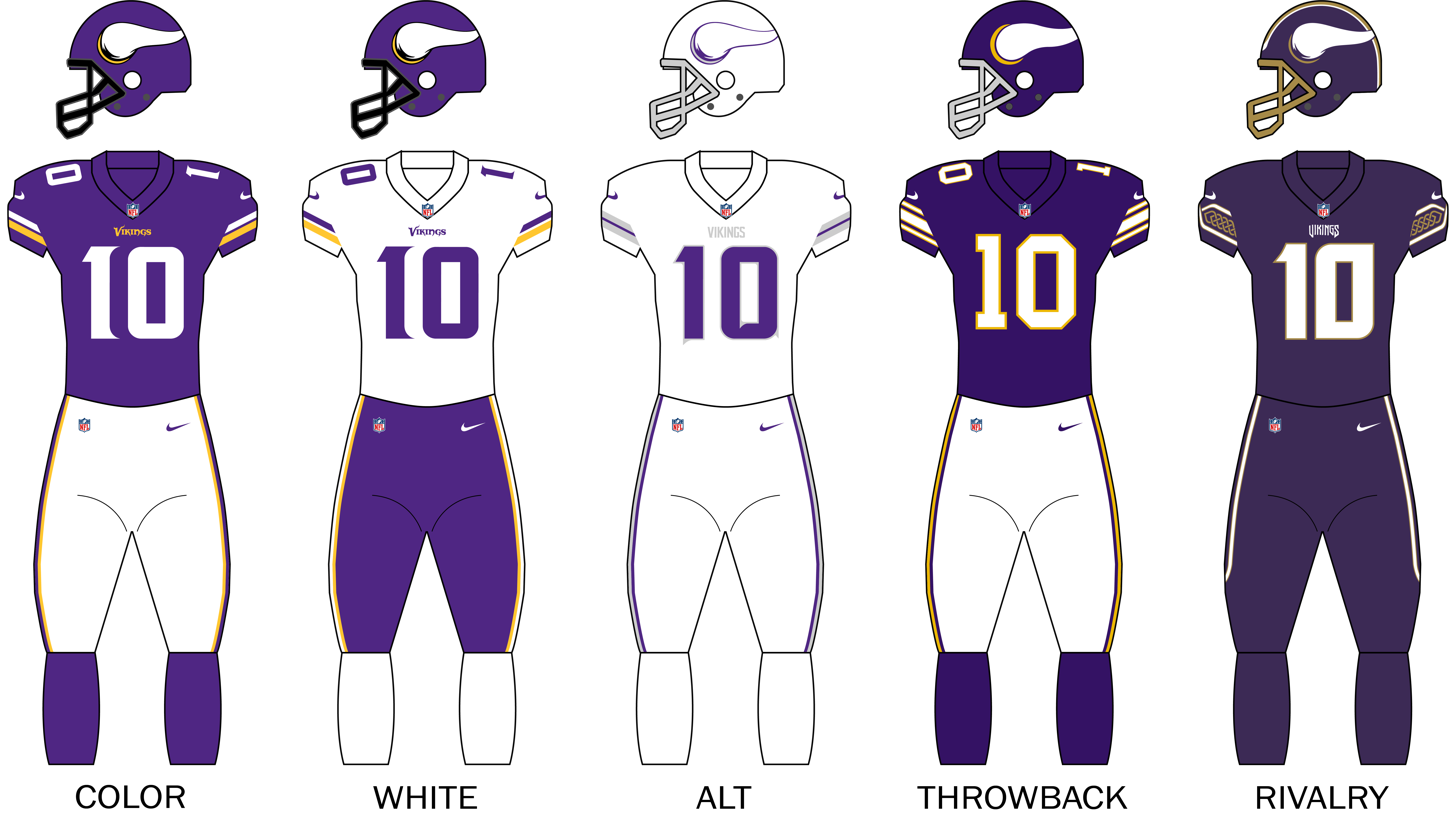
- Uniforms

General information
- Founded: January 28, 1960; 66 years ago
- Stadium: U.S. Bank Stadium Minneapolis, Minnesota
- Headquartered: TCO Performance Center; Eagan, Minnesota
- Colors: Purple, gold, white
- Fight song: Skol, Vikings
- Mascot: Viktor the Viking
- Website: vikings.com

Personnel
- Owner: Zygi Wilf
- General manager: Nolan Teasley
- Head coach: Kevin O'Connell
- President: Mark Wilf

Nicknames
- The Vikes; The Purple and Gold; The Purple; The Purple People Eaters (defensive line, 1967–1977)

Team history
- Minnesota Vikings (1961–present)

Home fields
- Metropolitan Stadium (1961–1981); Hubert H. Humphrey Metrodome (1982–2013); TCF Bank Stadium (2014–2015); U.S. Bank Stadium (2016–present)

League / conference affiliations
- National Football League (1961–present): Western Conference (1961–1969); Central Division (1967–1969); National Football Conference (1970–present); NFC Central (1970–2001); NFC North (2002–present)

Championships
- League championships: 0†: NFL championships (pre-1970 AFL–NFL merger) (1) 1969; † – Does not include 1969 NFL championship won during the same season that the Super Bowl was contested
- Conference championships: 4: NFL Western: 1969; NFC: 1973, 1974, 1976
- Division championships: 21: NFL Central: 1968, 1969; NFC Central: 1970, 1971, 1973, 1974, 1975, 1976, 1977, 1978, 1980, 1989, 1992, 1994, 1998, 2000; NFC North: 2008, 2009, 2015, 2017, 2022

Playoff appearances (32)
- NFL: 1968, 1969, 1970, 1971, 1973, 1974, 1975, 1976, 1977, 1978, 1980, 1982, 1987, 1988, 1989, 1992, 1993, 1994, 1996, 1997, 1998, 1999, 2000, 2004, 2008, 2009, 2012, 2015, 2017, 2019, 2022, 2024

Owners
- Bill Boyer, Max Winter, & H. P. Skoglund (1960–1986); Irwin L. Jacobs & Carl Pohlad (1986–1987); Wheelock Whitney Jr., Jaye F. Dyer, Irwin L. Jacobs & Carl Pohlad (1987–1991); Ten equal partners (1991–1998); Red McCombs (1998–2005); Zygi Wilf (2005–present)

The Minnesota Vikings are a professional American football team based in Minneapolis. The Vikings compete in the National Football League (NFL) as a member of the National Football Conference (NFC) North division. Founded in 1960 as an expansion team, the team began play the following year. They are named after the Vikings of medieval Scandinavia, reflecting the prominent Scandinavian American culture of Minnesota. The team plays its home games at U.S. Bank Stadium in the Downtown East section of Minneapolis.

The Vikings have an all-time overall record of 537–438–11, (Note: As of the end of the 2024 season.) the highest regular season and combined winning percentage among NFL franchises that have not won a Super Bowl, in addition to the most playoff runs, division titles, and (tied with the Buffalo Bills) Super Bowl appearances. They also have the most conference championship appearances of non-winning Super Bowl teams, with them being one of four (along with the Pittsburgh Steelers, Denver Broncos and Los Angeles Rams) to appear in a conference championship every decade since the 1970s.

== History ==
Professional football in the Minneapolis–Saint Paul area (the "Twin Cities") began with the Minneapolis Marines/Red Jackets, an NFL team that played intermittently in the 1920s and 1930s. A new professional team in the area did not surface again until August 1959, when Minnesota businessmen Bill Boyer, H. P. Skoglund, and Max Winter were awarded a franchise in the new American Football League (AFL). Five months later, in January 1960, after significant pressure from the NFL, the ownership group, along with Bernard H. Ridder, reneged on its agreement with the AFL and was then awarded the National Football League's 14th franchise, with play to begin in 1961. Ole Haugsrud was added to the NFL team ownership because, in the 1920s, when he sold his Duluth Eskimos team back to the league, the agreement allowed him 10 percent of any future Minnesota team. The teams from Ole Haugsrud's high school, Central High School in Superior, Wisconsin, were also called the Vikings and had a similar purple-and-yellow color scheme.

From the team's first season in 1961 to 1981, the team called Metropolitan Stadium in suburban Bloomington home. The Vikings conducted summer training camp at Bemidji State University from 1961 to 1965. In 1966, the team moved their training camp to Minnesota State University in Mankato. The training camp at Minnesota State was one of the longest continuously running training camp events in the NFL and is remembered as part of the golden era history of the team. The Vikings played their home games at the Hubert H. Humphrey Metrodome in Minneapolis from 1982 to 2013. The Vikings played their last game at the Metrodome on December 29, 2013, defeating the Detroit Lions 14–13 to end the season.

Since the team's first season in 1961, the Vikings have had one of the highest winning percentages in the NFL. As of 2022, they have won at least three games in every season except in 1962, and are one of only seven NFL teams to win at least 15 games in a regular season. The Vikings have won one NFL Championship, in 1969, before the league's merger with the American Football League (AFL) in 1970. Since the merger, the team has qualified for the playoffs 28 times, third-most in the league (trailing only the Dallas Cowboys and Pittsburgh Steelers). The team played in Super Bowls IV, VIII, IX and XI, but failed to win any of them. In addition, they have lost in their last six NFC Championship Game appearances, stretching back to 1978. The Vikings have 15 members in the Pro Football Hall of Fame.

=== 1960s ===
The team was officially named the Minnesota Vikings on September 27, 1960; the name is partly meant to reflect Minnesota's place as a center of Scandinavian American culture. From the start, the Vikings embraced a marketing program that produced first-year season ticket sales of nearly 26,000 and an average home attendance of 34,586, about 85 percent of Metropolitan Stadium's capacity of 40,800. The capacity of Met Stadium was eventually increased to 47,900. Bert Rose, former public relations director for the Los Angeles Rams, was appointed the team's first general manager. The search for the first head coach saw the team court then-Northwestern University head coach Ara Parseghian, who, according to Minneapolis Star writer Jim Klobuchar—the Vikings' first beat reporter for that newspaper—visited team management in the Twin Cities under the condition that his visit was to be kept secret from his employer. His cover was blown by columnist Sid Hartman, who reported the visit and forced Parseghian to issue denials. Philadelphia Eagles assistant Nick Skorich and a man with Minnesota ties who was working in the CFL, Bud Grant, were also candidates until a different Eagle, quarterback Norm Van Brocklin, was hired on January 18, 1961. Van Brocklin had just finished his career as a player on a high note, having defeated the Green Bay Packers in the 1960 NFL Championship Game.

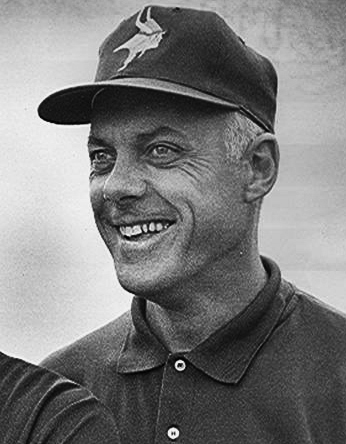
Head coach Bud Grant (1967–1983 and 1985)

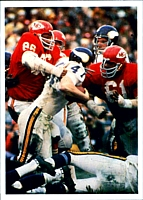
The Vikings were upset by the Chiefs 23–7 in Super Bowl IV.

As a new franchise, the Vikings had the first overall selection in the 1961 NFL draft, and they picked running back Tommy Mason of Tulane. They also took a young quarterback from the University of Georgia named Fran Tarkenton in the third round. Notable veterans acquired in the offseason were George Shaw and Hugh McElhenny. The Vikings won their first regular-season game, defeating the Chicago Bears 37–13 on Opening Day 1961. Tarkenton came off the bench to throw four touchdown passes and run for another to lead the upset. Reality set in as the expansion team lost its next seven games on their way to a 3–11 record. The losing continued throughout much of the 1960s as the Vikings had a combined record of 32 wins, 59 losses, and 7 ties in their first seven seasons with only one winning season (8–5–1 in 1964).

On March 7, 1967, quarterback Fran Tarkenton was traded to the New York Giants for a first-round and second-round draft choice in 1967, a first-round choice in 1968 and a second-round choice in 1969. With the picks, Minnesota selected Clinton Jones and Bob Grim in 1967, Ron Yary in 1968 and Ed White in 1969. On March 10, 1967, the Vikings hired new head coach Bud Grant to replace Van Brocklin, who had resigned on February 11, 1967. Grant came to the Vikings from the Canadian Football League as head coach for the Winnipeg Blue Bombers, whom he led to four Grey Cup Championships in 10 years. Replacing Tarkenton at quarterback was eight-year CFL veteran and Grey Cup champion Joe Kapp. During the late 1960s, the Vikings built a powerful defense known as the Purple People Eaters, led by Alan Page, Carl Eller, Gary Larsen, and Jim Marshall. In 1968, that stingy defense earned the Vikings their first Central Division title and their first playoff berth.

In 1969, the Vikings secured a 12–2 record. The team had 12 straight regular-season victories after a season-opening loss to the New York Giants, which was the longest single-season winning streak in 35 years. The Vikings defeated the Cleveland Browns 27–7 in the last pre-merger NFL Championship Game on January 4, 1970, at Metropolitan Stadium. The Vikings became the first modern NFL expansion team to win an NFL Championship Game, and earned a berth in Super Bowl IV. However, the heavily favored Vikings lost that game to the Kansas City Chiefs, 23–7. The team MVP that season was Joe Kapp, who threw for seven touchdowns against the Baltimore Colts – still an all-time NFL record. However, Kapp refused to accept the award, stating, "There is not one most valuable Viking... there are 40 most valuable Vikings!"

=== 1970s ===
The team continued to dominate in 1970 (moving into the newly formed NFC Central) and 1971, reaching the playoffs behind the stubborn "Purple People Eaters" defensive line. In 1971, Alan Page won the NFL Most Valuable Player Award given by the Associated Press. He was the first defensive player to win the award.

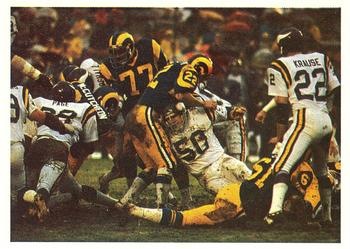
The Vikings' famed Purple People Eaters defensive line stopping a Rams rush in the 1977 NFC Divisional Playoff game.

On January 27, 1972, the Vikings traded Norm Snead, Bob Grim, Vince Clements and first-round draft picks in 1972 and 1973 to the New York Giants to reacquire the popular Fran Tarkenton. While the acquisitions of Tarkenton and wide receiver John Gilliam improved the passing attack, the running game was inconsistent and the Vikings finished with a disappointing 7–7 record. The Vikings addressed the problem by drafting running back Chuck Foreman with their first pick in the 1973 draft. Co-owner Bill Boyer died on February 19, 1973 and was replaced on the team's board of directors by his son-in-law Jack Steele.

The Vikings won their first nine games of 1973 and finished the season with a 12–2 record. They then advanced to their second Super Bowl in franchise history, Super Bowl VIII, against the Miami Dolphins at Rice Stadium in Houston, Texas. However, the Dolphins prevailed, 24–7.

The Vikings won the Central Division again in 1974 with a 10–4 record. In the playoffs they built on their cold-weather reputation, defeating both the St. Louis Cardinals 30–14 and the Los Angeles Rams 14–10 in frozen Metropolitan Stadium. The Vikings played in their second straight Super Bowl, Super Bowl IX (3rd overall), losing to the Pittsburgh Steelers, 16–6, at Tulane Stadium in New Orleans on January 12, 1975.

Led by Tarkenton and running back Chuck Foreman, the 1975 Vikings got off to a 10–0 start and easily won another division title. However, the Vikings lost to the Dallas Cowboys in the playoffs, 17–14, on a controversial touchdown pass from the Cowboys' quarterback Roger Staubach to wide receiver Drew Pearson that became known as the Hail Mary. The touchdown was controversial because many felt that Pearson pushed off on Vikings defensive back Nate Wright, committing pass interference. As the Metropolitan Stadium crowd was stunned to learn that no penalty was called, debris was thrown on the field for several minutes. A Corby's Whiskey bottle struck game official Armen Terzian, rendering him unconscious.

The Vikings played in Super Bowl XI, their third Super Bowl (fourth overall) in four years, against the Oakland Raiders at the Rose Bowl in Pasadena, California, on January 9, 1977. The Vikings, however, lost 32–14.

In 1977, the Vikings again won the Central Division with a 9–5 record and advanced to their 4th NFC Championship Game in 5 years, but were defeated by the eventual Super Bowl Champion Cowboys, 23–6, at Texas Stadium.

By 1978, age was taking its toll on the Vikings, but they still made the playoffs with an 8–7–1 record. There was no more playoff magic as the Rams finally defeated the Vikings, 34–10 in Los Angeles after having lost in their previous four playoff matchups (in 1969, '74, '76 and '77). Quarterback Fran Tarkenton retired after the season holding league passer records in attempts (6,467), completions (3,686), yards (47,003), and touchdowns (342).

In December 1979, ground was broken for construction of the Hubert H. Humphrey Metrodome in downtown Minneapolis.

=== 1980s ===
On May 15, 1981, the Vikings moved into a new facility in suburban Eden Prairie that housed the team's offices, locker room and practice fields. The complex was named "Winter Park" after Max Winter, one of the Vikings' founders, who served as the team's president from 1965 to 1987. The Vikings played their final game at Metropolitan Stadium on December 20 to conclude the 1981 NFL season by losing to the Kansas City Chiefs, 10–6.

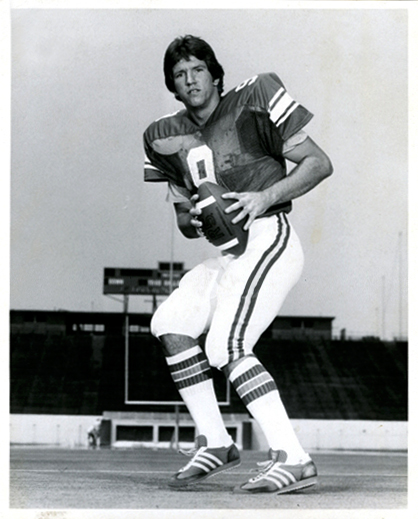
"Two-minute" Tommy Kramer (1977–1989)

The Vikings played their first game at the Metrodome in a preseason matchup against the Seattle Seahawks on August 21, 1982, in a game Minnesota won, 7–3. The first touchdown in the new facility was scored by Joe Senser on an 11-yard pass from Tommy Kramer. The first regular-season game in the Metrodome was the 1982 opener on September 12, when the Vikings defeated Tampa Bay, 17–10. Rickey Young scored the first regular-season touchdown in the facility on a 3-yard run in the 2nd quarter. That year the defense led by Joey Browner began a dominant 10-year run as a premier NFL defensive back. The Vikings beat the St. Louis Cardinals 28–10 on August 6, 1983, at Wembley Stadium in London in the first international game in the NFL.

On January 27, 1984, Bud Grant retired as head coach of the Vikings. With a career regular-season record of 151–87–5 (.632) in 17 seasons with Minnesota, Grant led the franchise to 12 playoff appearances, 11 division titles, and four Super Bowls. Les Steckel, who was an offensive assistant with the Vikings for 5 seasons, was then named the 3rd head coach in franchise history. Steckel, who came to the Vikings in 1979 after working as an assistant with the 49ers, was the youngest head coach in the NFL in 1984 at age 38. However, the Vikings lost a franchise-worst 13 games. After the season Steckel was fired, and on December 18, 1984, Bud Grant came out of retirement and was rehired as the head coach of the Vikings.

On January 6, 1986, after the 1985 season, Bud Grant re-retired, this time permanently, as head coach of the Vikings. At the time of his retirement, he held the 6th best winning record for a coach in NFL history with 168 career wins, including playoffs. In 18 seasons, he led the Vikings to a 158–96–5 regular-season record. Longtime Vikings assistant coach Jerry Burns was named the fourth head coach in team history on January 7, 1986. He served as the Vikings' offensive coordinator from 1968 to 1985, when the team won 11 division titles and played in four Super Bowls. In his first season, the Vikings, led by the NFL Comeback Player of the Year Tommy Kramer, went 9–7, their first winning record in four years. On August 2, 1986, Fran Tarkenton was the first player who played the majority of his career with the Vikings to be inducted into the Pro Football Hall of Fame.

After the strike-shortened 1987 season, the 8–7 Vikings, who had finished 8–4 in regular games, but 0–3 using strike-replacement players, pulled two upsets in the playoffs. They defeated the 12–3 New Orleans Saints 44–10 at the Louisiana Superdome in the Wild Card game. The following week, in the Divisional Playoff game, they beat the 13–2 San Francisco 49ers 36–24 at Candlestick Park. During that game, Anthony Carter set the all-time record for most receiving yards in a playoff game with 227 yards. The Vikings played the Washington Redskins in the NFC Championship Game on January 17, 1988, at RFK Stadium. Trailing 17–10, the Vikings drove to the Redskins' 6-yard line with a little over a minute left in the game, but failed to get the ball into the end zone. The Vikings' hopes of a Super Bowl ended when Darrin Nelson dropped a pass from Wade Wilson on fourth down at the goal line.

On October 12, 1989, the Vikings acquired Herschel Walker from Dallas. The final result of the trade gave the Vikings Walker, third-round choice Mike Jones, fifth-round choice Reggie Thornton and 10th-round choice Pat Newman in 1990 and a third-round choice Jake Reed in 1991. Dallas received Issiac Holt, David Howard, Darrin Nelson, Jesse Solomon, Alex Stewart, a first-, second- and a sixth-round choice in 1990, first- and second-round choices in 1991 and a first-, second- and third-round choice in 1992. Two of those selections turned into Emmitt Smith and Darren Woodson. Walker's performance fell short of expectations in his three seasons with the Vikings, while the Cowboys rode their draft picks to three Super Bowl victories in the early-to-mid-1990s.

=== 1990s ===
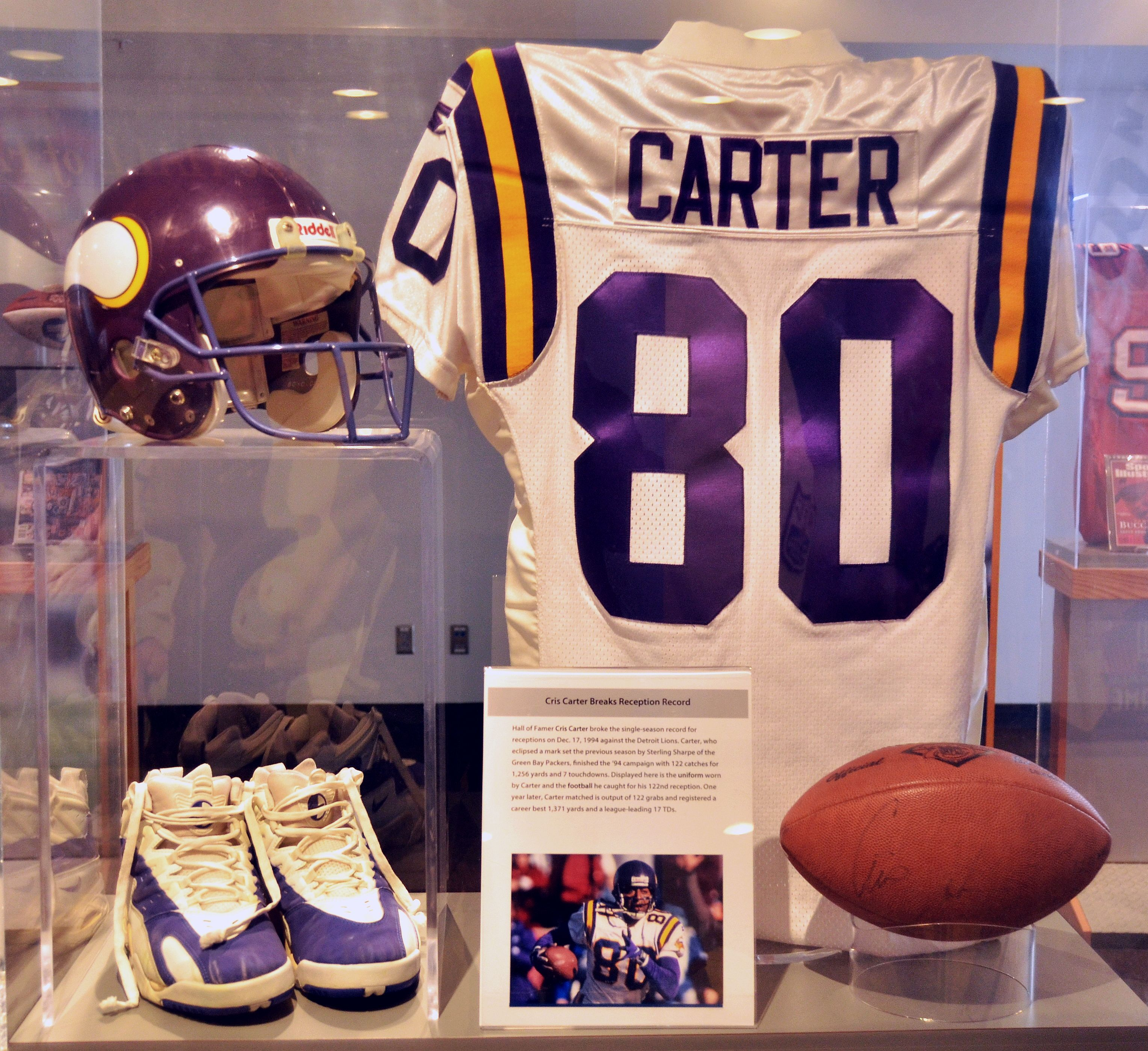
Cris Carter's Hall of Fame display. Carter was a Viking from 1990 to 2001.

On December 3, 1991, Jerry Burns announced his retirement effective at the end of the 1991 season. In six seasons as head coach of the Vikings, Burns compiled a career record of 52–43 (.547). He also led Minnesota to three playoff appearances, including a division title and an NFC Championship Game. Dennis Green was later named the fifth head coach in team history, after turning around a struggling Stanford University football program as head coach from 1989 to 1991. In his 10 seasons as the coach of the Vikings, Green won four NFC Central division titles, had eight playoff appearances, two NFC Championship Game appearances and an all-time record of 97–62. The Vikings therefore had the fifth highest winning percentage among all NFL teams during the regular season in the 1990s.

==== 1998 ====
1998 was a year to remember for the franchise. With a spectacular offense led by quarterback Randall Cunningham (who replaced an injured Brad Johnson), running back Robert Smith, veteran wide receiver Cris Carter, and explosive rookie Randy Moss, the Vikings set a then-NFL record by scoring a total of 556 points, never scoring fewer than 24 in a game. The Vikings finished the season 15–1, their only loss was to the Tampa Bay Buccaneers 27–24 in Week 9. In the playoffs, the Vikings rolled past the Arizona Cardinals 41–21, and came into the Metrodome heavily favored for their NFC title showdown with the Atlanta Falcons, who had gone 14–2 in the regular season. After kicker Gary Anderson, who had just completed the first perfect regular season in NFL history (not missing a single extra point or field goal attempt the entire year), missed a 38-yard field goal attempt with just over 2 minutes remaining, the Falcons' ensuing drive tied the game. This led to a controversial decision by head coach Dennis Green to run out the clock and let the game go to overtime. Though the Vikings won the coin toss, Atlanta went on to win it 30–27 in overtime on Morten Andersen's 38-yard field goal. The Vikings became the first 15–1 team to fail to reach the Super Bowl.

==== 1999 ====
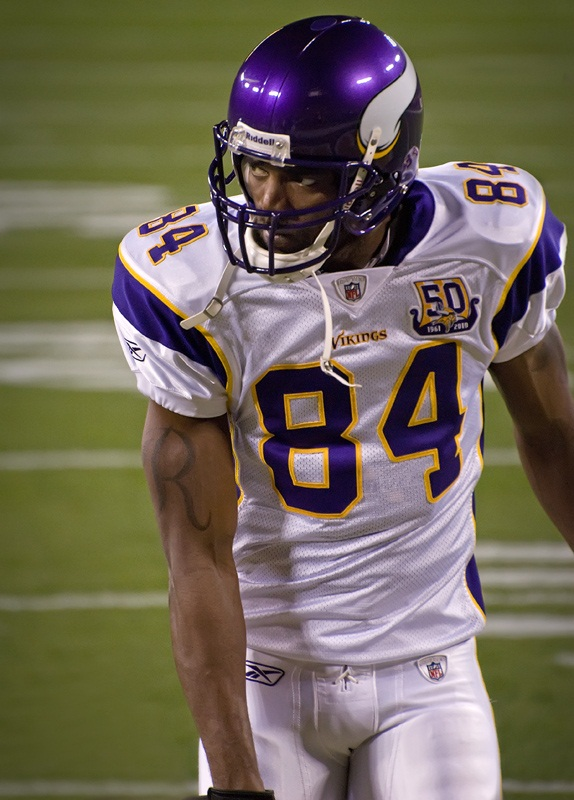
Randy Moss (1998–2004 and 2010)

Cunningham resumed duties in 1999, but after a 2–4 start, Jeff George replaced him as starting quarterback. He finished the season with an 8–2 record, and led the Vikings into the postseason once again, with an overall team record of 10–6. Minnesota beat Dallas in the Wild Card game 27–10, and faced playoff newcomer Kurt Warner and the St. Louis Rams in the Divisional matchup. The game was a shootout that Minnesota led 17–14 at halftime, but the Rams outscored Minnesota 35–20 in the second half to win 49–37.

=== 2000s ===
The Vikings entered the decade by winning the divisional championship and an appearance in the 2000 NFC Championship game, where they were defeated 41–0 by the New York Giants. The following season, they struggled to a 5–11 record. The team made the playoffs again in 2004, but did not win another divisional title until 2008. Since the merger, the 2000s became the decade with the fewest playoff berths for the franchise.

==== 2000 ====
In 2000, the Vikings went 11–5. The Vikings were 11–2 after 14 weeks, but stumbled briefly, losing their last three to the Rams, Packers and Colts while starting quarterback Daunte Culpepper was hampered by injury. Nonetheless, the Vikings made the playoffs for the fifth straight year. After easily beating the Saints in the Divisional game 34–16, they traveled to New York City to face the Giants in the NFC Championship Game. Though they were the road team, the Vikings were favored to win the game (since most considered their 11–2 record with Culpepper more indicative than their 0–3 record when he was out). Instead, the Vikings were defeated 41–0, their worst defeat in playoff history. Robert Smith, who ran for 1,521 yards that season, retired at the end of the year after only playing eight NFL seasons.

==== 2001–2005 ====
In 2001, after a disappointing 5–11 season, the Vikings bought out the contract of Dennis Green, despite his successful coaching tenure with the team. Mike Tice coached the final game of 2001, losing to the Ravens 19–3. Tice was named the permanent coach after the season, but he would not lead the Vikings back to the playoffs until 2004. In 2002, as part of the league's realignment with the addition of the Houston Texans, the Vikings and their other traditional NFC Central rivals became members of the newly formed NFC North.

During the 2003 season, the Vikings came close to getting into the playoffs. However, the Arizona Cardinals completed a game-winning touchdown on 4th-and-28 with 0:00 left, knocking the Vikings out of the playoffs. The moment of Arizona's touchdown was actually the first moment the entire season in which the Vikings hadn't led their division. The Vikings became the second team in football history to miss the playoffs after getting off to a 6–0 start, after the 1978 Washington Redskins.

In 2004, Daunte Culpepper amassed MVP-like statistics, throwing for 4,717 passing yards (leading the NFL), 39 passing touchdowns (a Viking record), and 5,123 total yards (an NFL record). In the wild card game, the Vikings defeated the rival Green Bay Packers at Lambeau Field in their first-ever playoff meeting, 31–17. In doing so, the Vikings became the second team in NFL history to have a .500 record (8–8) in the regular season and win a playoff game (The St. Louis Rams did the same thing only a day earlier). In the divisional round, the Vikings were defeated by the eventual NFC champion Philadelphia Eagles.

On March 2, 2005, Vikings wide receiver Randy Moss was traded to the Oakland Raiders for linebacker Napoleon Harris and the Raiders' first-round draft pick. After struggling to a disappointing 2–5 start to the 2005 season, Vikings lost quarterback Daunte Culpepper to a season-ending knee injury. This injury was a very significant part to this Minnesota Vikings team due to the fact they also lost Moss. The dynamic duo from years earlier was now gone and a new leader would eventually emerge. The Vikings finished the 2005 season with a 9–7 record.

In October, 17 team members were part of a party of about 90 that went out on a pleasure cruise on local Lake Minnetonka. The incident erupted into scandal when media reported a number of the players had performed sex acts and that prostitutes had been flown in. Four players were ultimately charged with misdemeanors related to the party.

Mike Tice was fired by owner Zygi Wilf after the 2005 season and was replaced by Brad Childress.

==== 2006–2008 ====
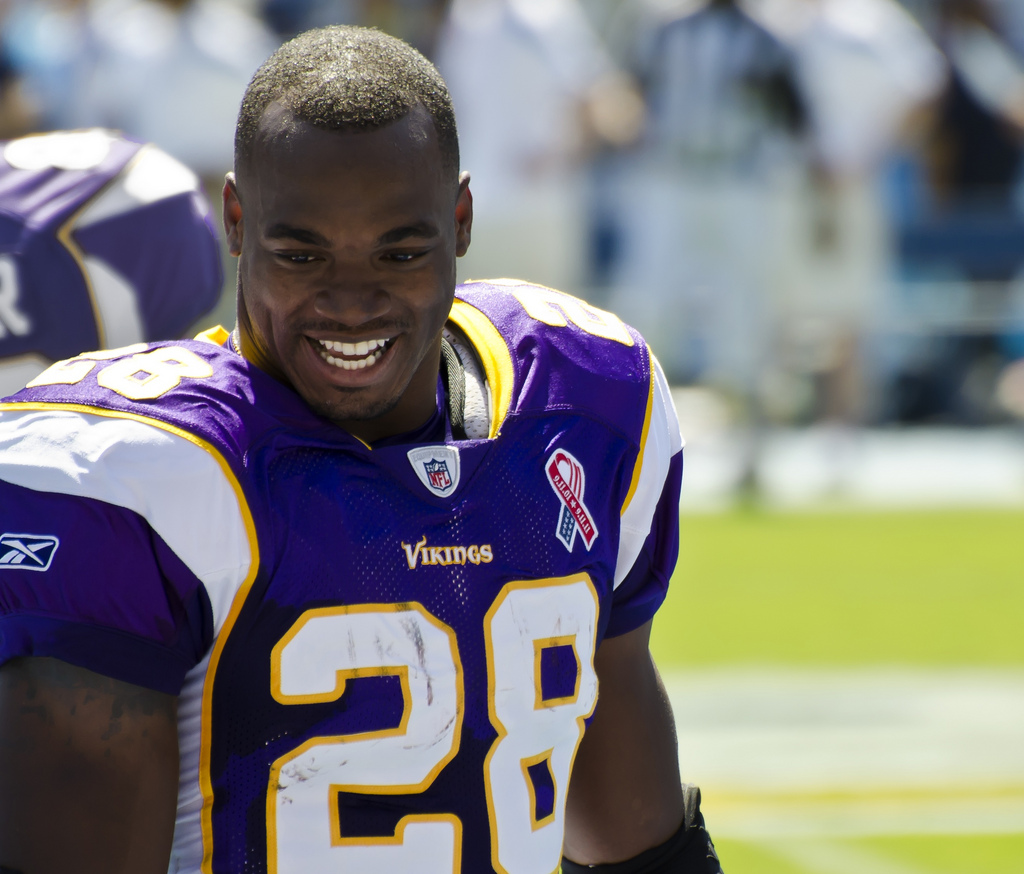
All-Pro running back Adrian Peterson was selected 7th overall by the Vikings in the 2007 NFL draft, and played for the Vikings from 2007 to 2016.

Minnesota began the 2006 season 4–2 (with Childress becoming the first Vikings coach to start his career 2–0), but finished the year at 6–10, receiving the 7th pick in the NFL draft. With their pick, the Vikings selected Adrian Peterson out of the University of Oklahoma.

Peterson's first career touchdown was a 60-yard screen pass against the Atlanta Falcons in his debut game. When the Vikings played the Chicago Bears in Week 6, Peterson broke the record for single-game All-Purpose (rushing, receiving, kick returning) yards (361 total yards, 224 rushing). In Week 9, Peterson broke the NFL single-game rushing record set by Jamal Lewis in 2003 by rushing for 296 yards against the San Diego Chargers. Despite a strong push in the middle of the season, winning five straight games, the Vikings lost their final two games to finish the season at 8–8 and missed the playoffs.

In Week 13 of the 2008 season against the Bears, Gus Frerotte hooked up with Bernard Berrian and set the record for longest play in franchise history with a 99-yard touchdown pass. In the 2009 season, Adrian Peterson led the NFL with 1760 rushing yards, breaking the franchise record. The Vikings clinched the NFC North championship for the first time after defeating the New York Giants 20–19 in Week 17, when kicker Ryan Longwell made the game-winning field goal. Peterson had 19 carries for 109 yards and added a touchdown during the game.

On January 4, 2009, the Vikings hosted the Philadelphia Eagles for the wild-card round, their first home playoff game in eight years. The Eagles led the Viking 16–14 at halftime and, coming off a 44–6 victory over the Dallas Cowboys, went on to defeat the Vikings 26–14.

Since 2006, the Vikings have been known especially for their strong run defense (#1 in the NFL in 2006, 2007, and 2008). They are the first NFL team to accomplish this since the AFL–NFL merger in 1970, anchored by the Williams Wall consisting of defensive tackle Kevin Williams and nose tackle Pat Williams (no relation). With the addition of sack-leader Jared Allen in 2008, the dominant front four began being called by several nicknames, including "Thunder and Plunder" and "Shock and AWE" (an acronym of their surname initials).

==== 2009 ====
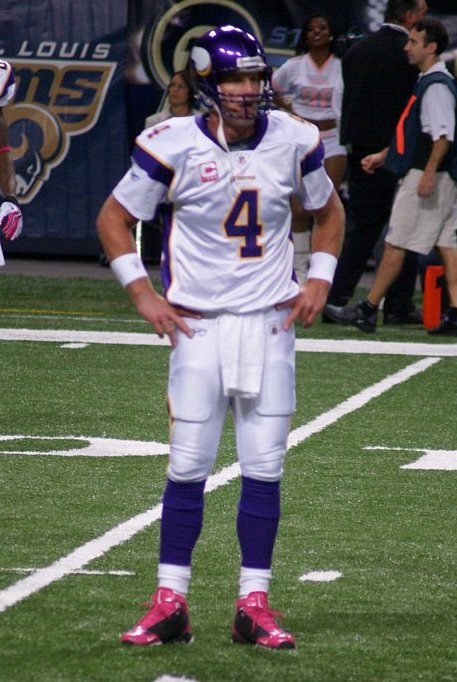
Brett Favre played for the Vikings in 2009 and 2010.

On August 18, 2009, after months of speculation and negotiations, twice-retired veteran quarterback Brett Favre, who until 2007 had played 16 years for division archrival Green Bay Packers, signed a two-year, $25 million deal with the Vikings.

On October 5, 2009, the Vikings hosted the Green Bay Packers as Favre played his former team for the first time. With a 30–23 victory on Monday Night Football, the Vikings moved to a 4–0 record. Favre became the first quarterback in NFL history to defeat all 32 current teams as a starter. Over 21.8 million viewers tuned in to watch the game, beating the previous record for a cable television program set by a game between the Philadelphia Eagles and the Dallas Cowboys in 2008 (18.6 million viewers).

The Vikings defeated the New York Giants, 44–7, in Week 17 to help the team clinch the second seed in the conference and a first-round-bye with an Eagles loss later that same day. The Vikings ended the regular season with a 12–4 record, their best record since 2000 and the first 11-plus win season since their record-setting 1998 campaign. The Vikings played the Dallas Cowboys in the divisional round on January 17, 2010, and won the game by a score of 34–3, advancing the Vikings to the NFC Championship game, the ninth in franchise history. This would also be the first NFC Championship game for the team since the 2000 season. Minnesota traveled to New Orleans the next week to face top-seeded Saints in the first conference championship game held at the Superdome. Despite out-gaining the Saints on offense by nearly a twofold margin, the Vikings were hindered by five turnovers, including a Favre interception in the final minute of the fourth quarter in Saints territory. They were beaten in overtime, 31–28, as the Saints won the coin toss and kicked a 40-yard field goal on the first possession of overtime. (Note: Due in part to this outcome, during the subsequent off-season the NFL rules committee adjusted the overtime rules for the 2010 postseason, and in 2011 for both regular season and postseason games. The new rules state that unless the first possession of overtime ends in a touchdown or safety, both teams must have the opportunity to possess the ball. Under the new rules, the Vikings would have had an opportunity to possess the ball after the Saints kicked a field goal on the overtime's first possession in the NFC Championship.)

=== 2010s ===
The Vikings performed similarly in the 2010s, only making the playoffs four times and going 2–4 in those games. Additionally, there was inconsistency at the quarterback position, with thirteen quarterbacks starting at least one game for the team during this decade. Despite their performance, the team performed better in the regular season overall after the 2013 season, including an NFC Championship appearance in 2017.

==== 2010–2013 ====
In the first week of the 2010 NFL regular season, the Vikings played the defending Super Bowl champions, the New Orleans Saints. The Vikings lost 14–9. In Week 2, the Vikings played the Miami Dolphins and lost 14–10. The Vikings defeated the Detroit Lions 24–10 in the third week of the season. After a week four bye-week, the Vikings received star wide receiver Randy Moss in a trade with the New England Patriots. Even with the addition of Moss, the Vikings lost to the New York Jets 29–20 in Week 5. The Vikings won a crucial victory against another struggling team in the form of the Dallas Cowboys 24–21, but in Week 7, the Vikings lost to the Green Bay Packers 28–24. In Week 9, the Vikings played the Arizona Cardinals at home and won 27–24 in overtime, coming back from a 24–10 deficit in the final four minutes of regulation. Favre threw for a career-high 446 passing yards. The Vikings then played the Chicago Bears, but were defeated, and then went on to be blown out 31–3 at home by the Packers the following game. Head coach Brad Childress was fired the next Monday. With Leslie Frazier filling in for the fired Childress, the Vikings won two games in a row. One against the Washington Redskins on the road, and a blowout win over the Buffalo Bills at home.

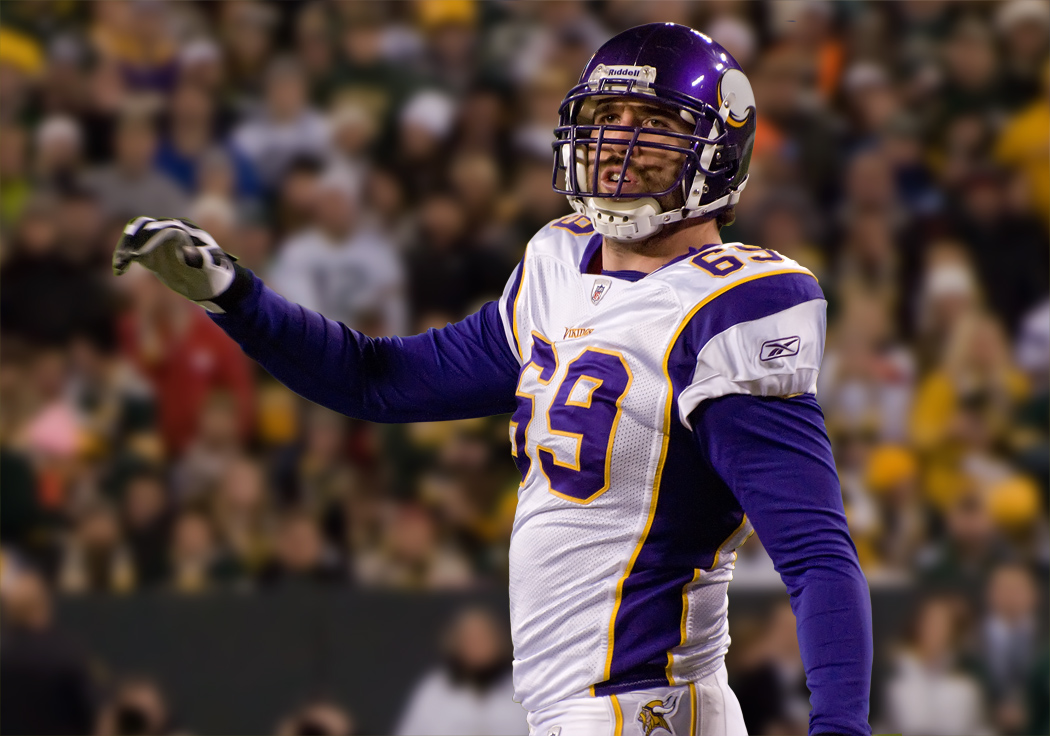
Defensive end Jared Allen played for the Vikings from 2008 to 2013.

After a winter storm dropped nearly 17 inches (430 mm) of snow in the Minneapolis/St Paul area the Saturday before the Vikings December 12 home game versus the New York Giants and 30 mph (48 km/h) gusts drove snow removers off the dome's roof overnight, several panels were damaged as the weight of the snow caused the roof to collapse. After viewing the damage, Vikings management and the NFL decided to move the game to Monday and play it at Ford Field in Detroit, Michigan. Because of ongoing repairs to the roof of the Metrodome, the Vikings played their December 20 game versus the Chicago Bears at TCF Bank Stadium. Favre threw the final touchdown pass of his career (to Percy Harvin) in this game. On December 26, the NFL announced that the game versus the Philadelphia Eagles was being postponed to Tuesday, December 28, 2010, because of blizzard conditions. This marks the third consecutive venue or date change for a Vikings game and was the first NFL game played on a Tuesday since 1964. The Vikings proceeded to upset the dynamic Eagles offense, led by a resurgent Michael Vick, 24–14 with rookie Joe Webb at the helm. The Vikings finished the season 6–10 with a 20–13 loss against the Detroit Lions.

The 2010–11 season was a step down for the Minnesota Vikings. After coming within a few plays of Super Bowl XLIV, Minnesota ended the 2010 season with a 6–10 record and a last place finish in the NFC North for the first time since 1990. During the season, the Vikings had many distractions, including trading for Randy Moss and then waiving him only a month later, Brett Favre's NFL investigation for allegedly sending inappropriate text messages to Jets' employee Jenn Sterger while he was with the team in 2008, the Metrodome's collapse and resulting venue changes, and finally head coach Brad Childress' firing on November 22 after a 31–3 loss at the hands of the rival Green Bay Packers.

After serving as the interim head coach for the final six games of the season (finishing with a 3–3 record), defensive coordinator Leslie Frazier was officially named the head coach on January 3, 2011, after signing a three-year contract. On January 17, Brett Favre retired for the third, and officially last, time, leaving the team in search of a long-term replacement at the quarterback position. Wasting no time after being appointed head coach, Frazier began to restructure the team's coaching staff, including letting go of offensive coordinator Darrell Bevell and hiring Mike Singletary as linebackers coach and Bill Musgrave as the new offensive coordinator. Their first-round draft pick was Christian Ponder, a quarterback from Florida State University. The team finished with a 3–13 record, tied with the 1984 Vikings for the second-worst record in franchise history.

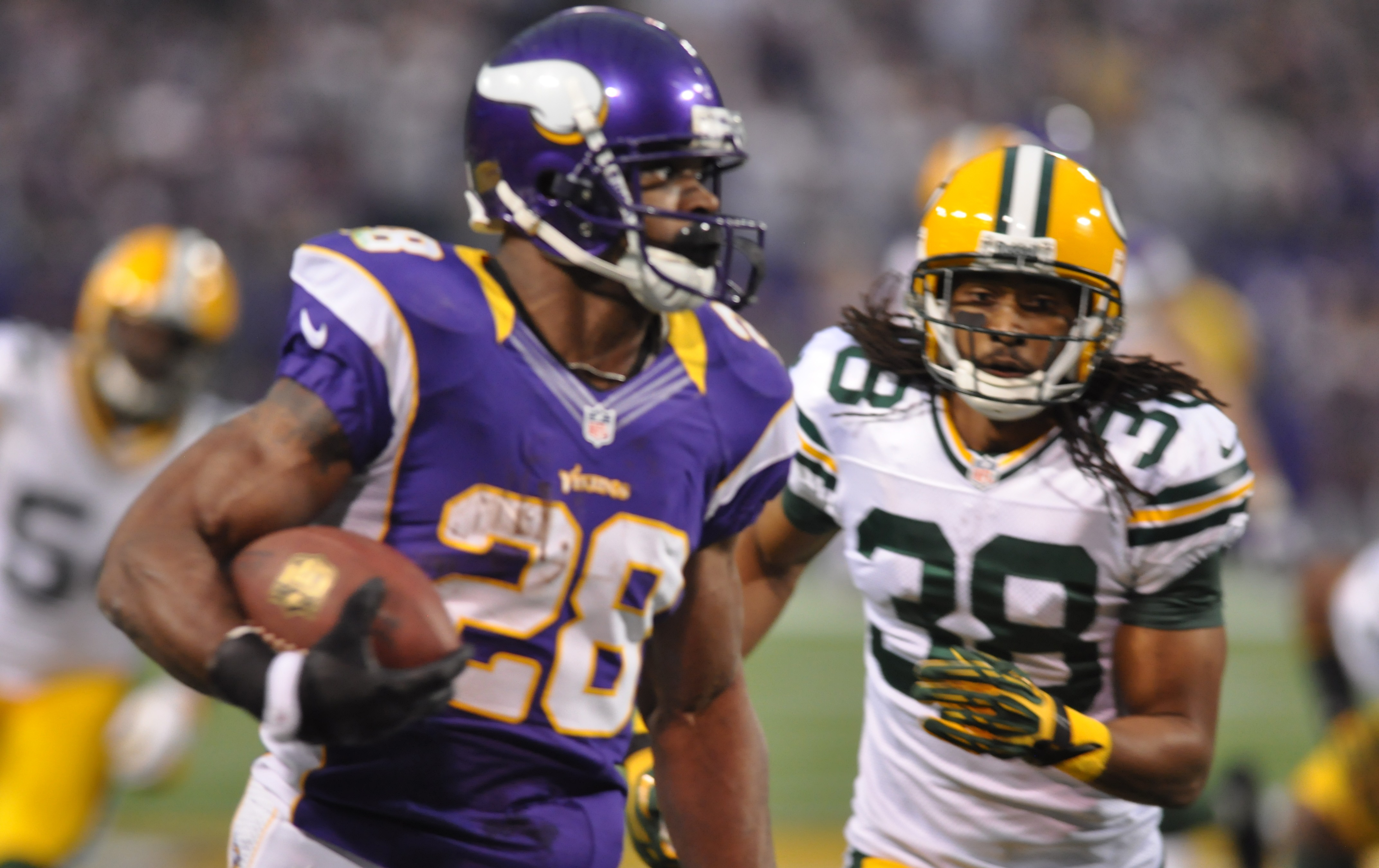
In 2012, Adrian Peterson rushed for 2,097 yards – 8 yards short of Eric Dickerson's single-season record.

During the 2012 NFL draft, the team selected USC lineman Matt Kalil with the 4th overall pick after a trade with the Cleveland Browns, and Notre Dame safety Harrison Smith in the first round. Both players were instrumental in helping the Vikings reach the playoffs for the 27th time in franchise history, as was fellow draftee, sixth-round kicker Blair Walsh. After beating the Packers in the final game of 2012 to reach the playoffs as the NFC's sixth seed, the Vikings lost 24–10 to the Packers in the rematch at Lambeau Field in the wild-card round. The team was forced to play backup Joe Webb during the game after Ponder was sidelined due to an arm injury sustained from the previous week. Peterson was later named the league's MVP, after rushing for 2,097 yards, the second most rushing yards in a season in NFL history.

In the 2013 season, the Vikings finished with five wins, ten losses, and one tie, with no road wins. Notable moments include acquired free agent Matt Cassel outplaying Christian Ponder at the quarterback position and the defense allowing a league-worst 480 points, coming within four points of matching the franchise's worst set in 1984. This was also the last season played at the Metrodome as a new stadium deal was reached. Leslie Frazier was fired after the regular season ended.

==== 2014–2019 ====
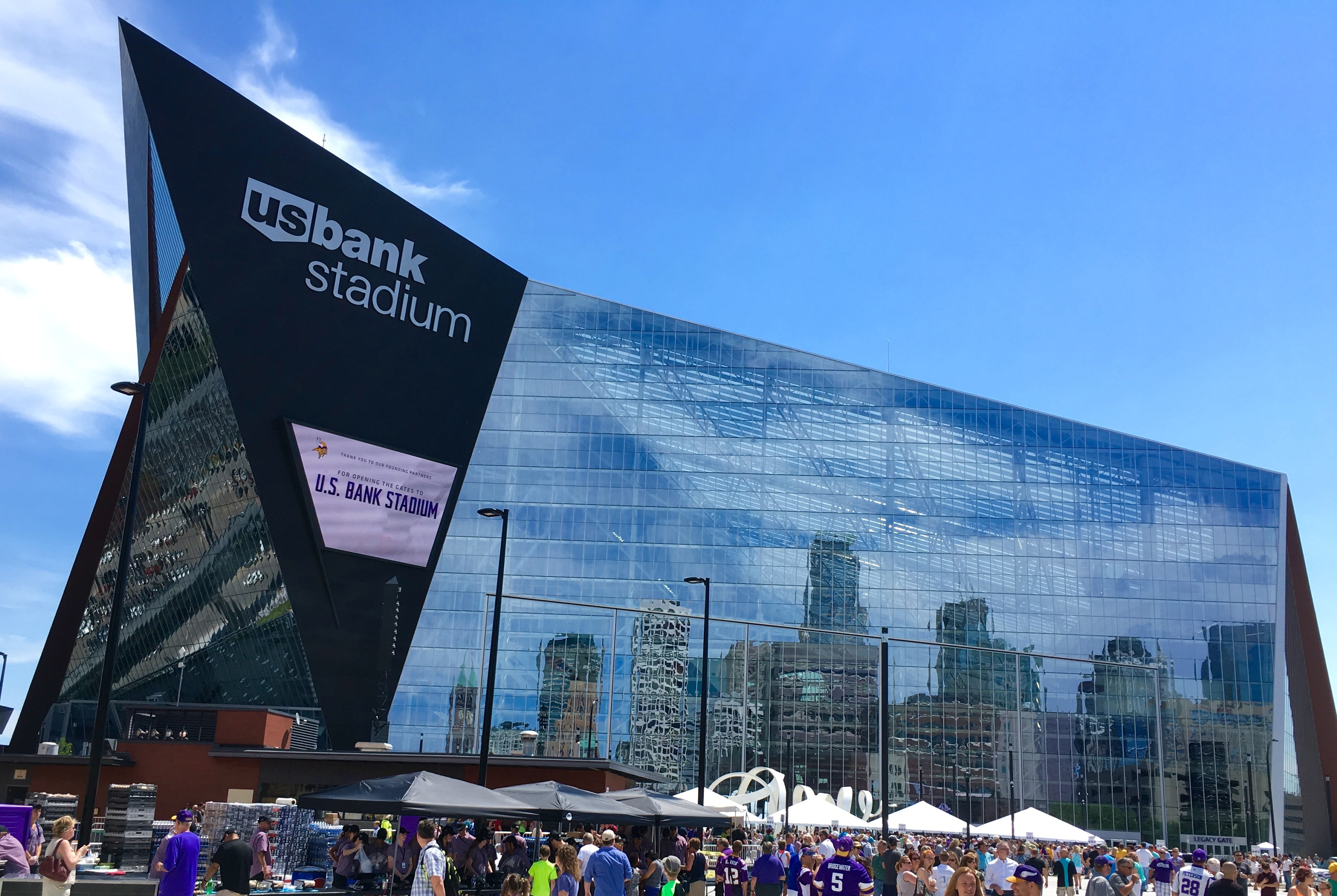
The Vikings moved to U.S. Bank Stadium in 2016

The team hired former Cincinnati Bengals defensive coordinator Mike Zimmer to replace Leslie Frazier as head coach on January 16, 2014. Former Cleveland Browns offensive coordinator Norv Turner replaced Bill Musgrave, and George Edwards replaced Alan Williams as defensive coordinator. In the 2014 NFL draft, the Vikings selected Anthony Barr, a linebacker out of UCLA, and Teddy Bridgewater, a quarterback out of the University of Louisville. Bridgewater would later lose the starting job to Matt Cassel only to become the starter for the Vikings when Cassel was lost to a season-ending foot injury in week 3. Star running back Adrian Peterson only played in one regular-season game due to his ongoing child abuse trial, with NFL commissioner Roger Goodell placing Peterson on the Commissioner's Exempt List indefinitely. On April 16, 2015, the league released a statement issuing Peterson's reinstatement to occur on April 17, 2015. The Vikings concluded their season with seven wins and nine losses, winning only one game against a divisional opponent, although Bridgewater set a franchise record for wins by a rookie starting quarterback. On January 3, 2016, the Vikings beat divisional rival Green Bay 20–13 to win the NFC North for the first time since 2009. The Vikings, led by their top 5 defense, ended the 2015 season with an 11–5 record, and a #3 seed in the playoffs. However, they lost to the Seattle Seahawks 10–9 after Blair Walsh missed a 27-yard field goal in the third coldest game in NFL playoff history.

The Vikings were responsible for a historic milestone in the late rounds of the 2016 NFL draft. Their sixth-round selection, German wide receiver Moritz Böhringer, was the first European player ever to be drafted by an NFL team without having previously played at any level in North America. After Teddy Bridgewater went down with a knee injury in the preseason of 2016, the Vikings traded their 2017 first round pick and a conditional fourth round pick to the Philadelphia Eagles for quarterback Sam Bradford, who threw for 20 touchdowns, 5 interceptions, 3,877 yards, and while starting the season a league best 5–0, completed the season 3–8 for a season total of 8–8. After the knee injury, the Vikings declined to pick up the fifth-year option on Bridgewater. Running back Adrian Peterson went down to injury in Week 2 against the Green Bay Packers with a torn meniscus and was placed on the Injured Reserve until Week 15. On February 28, 2017, the Vikings announced they would not exercise Peterson's 2017 contract option which made him a free agent. Had they exercised the option, Peterson would be owed $18 million for the 2017 season. On April 25, 2017, the New Orleans Saints signed Peterson to a two-year, $7 million contract, ending his tenure with the Vikings since his debut in 2007 as a rookie. He holds several Vikings records including most career rushing touchdowns, career rushing yards, and most rushing yards in a season.

In the summer of 2017, the Vikings ownership announced they would end the 52-year annual tradition of summer training camp in Mankato at Minnesota State University, Mankato, as they built a large new headquarters building, training facility and area property development in Eagan on the site of the former Northwest Airlines offices completed in the spring of 2018 in time for the 2018 summer training camp that July.

The Vikings won the NFC North for the second time in three years in 2017, finishing with a 13–3 record that saw them go into the playoffs as the No. 2 seed in the NFC. In the divisional round, they came up against the New Orleans Saints. With less than 10 seconds remaining in the game and trailing by a single point, the Vikings lined up on 3rd-and-10 on their own 39-yard line. Quarterback Case Keenum threw the ball to wide receiver Stefon Diggs inside field goal range near the right sideline, giving the receiver a chance to get out of bounds with just enough time for a game-winning field goal attempt. However, safety Marcus Williams missed his attempted tackle, allowing Diggs to run down the sideline unopposed for the first walk-off game-winning touchdown in NFL playoff history. On KFAN 100.3, radio announcer Paul Allen called the play the 'Minneapolis Miracle'. The Vikings went on to the NFC Championship for the opportunity to play in Super Bowl LII in their own stadium, only to lose 38–7 to the eventual Super Bowl champion Philadelphia Eagles.

On March 15, 2018, quarterback Kirk Cousins signed a three-year fully guaranteed $84 million contract with the Vikings. The signing made Cousins the highest paid football player at the time. The Vikings finished with an 8–7–1 record and missed the playoffs in the 2018 season.

On September 22, 2019, the Vikings defeated the Oakland Raiders for their 500th win as a franchise, with an overall record of 500–427–11 at that point. The team finished the 2019 season at 10–6, clinching a wild card spot. The Vikings went on to pull an upset victory in the wild card round against the New Orleans Saints 26–20 in overtime. The victory advanced the team to the divisional round, where they lost to the eventual NFC champions San Francisco 49ers 10–27.

=== 2020s ===
==== 2020 ====
The Vikings used the 22nd overall pick in the 2020 NFL draft on All-Pro wide receiver Justin Jefferson. After falling to the New Orleans Saints on Christmas Day, the Minnesota Vikings were eliminated from the 2020 playoffs. The Vikings finished 7–9 in 2020, the first losing season since 2014 and only the second under Zimmer.

==== 2021 ====
In 2021, the Vikings missed the playoffs for the second straight season after a 37–10 loss to the Green Bay Packers in Week 17. After a 31–17 win over the Chicago Bears in Week 18 to finish the season 8–9, the team fired head coach Mike Zimmer and general manager Rick Spielman on January 10, 2022.

==== 2022 ====
On January 26, 2022, the Vikings hired Kwesi Adofo-Mensah, former vice president of football operations at the Cleveland Browns and Director of R&D at the San Francisco 49ers, to be the team's new general manager. After the Los Angeles Rams won Super Bowl LVI on February 13, 2022, the Vikings subsequently named then-Rams offensive coordinator Kevin O'Connell as their franchise's 10th head coach on February 16. The Vikings finished the regular season as NFC North champions with a 13–4 record. They also set an NFL record by winning 11 one-score games, the most in any NFL season. The Vikings entered the playoffs as the number three seed in the NFC, but lost in the wild-card round to the New York Giants 31–24.

==== 2023 ====
In Week 8, the Vikings lost Kirk Cousins for the season to an Achilles injury. The Vikings closed out the year with Jaren Hall, Joshua Dobbs, and Nick Mullens seeing time at quarterback. The team finished the 2023 season with a 7–10 record. In the offseason, Cousins departed for the Atlanta Falcons. The Vikings had the 10th overall pick in the 2024 NFL draft and used it on Michigan quarterback J. J. McCarthy.

==== 2024 ====
While first-round draft pick JJ McCarthy was originally speculated to have the opportunity to be a starter, battling for the QB1 positions with journeyman backup Sam Darnold, who had been signed in the offseason. However, after encountering knee swelling the day after his NFL debut in a pre-season game, McCarthy underwent knee surgery for his meniscus, ending his season. Darnold became the starter, but there was not much excitement around him. Initial predictions for the Vikings record were shaky, with estimations such as 9–8 and 7–10. Darnold, however, had a breakout season, leading the Vikings to a 14–3 record, becoming the first quarterback in the NFL to win 14 games in their first season with a team.

== Logo and uniforms ==
The Vikings' trademark horned helmet and purple-and-gold uniforms were designed by Los Angeles Examiner cartoonist Karl Hubenthal. Bert Rose and Norm Van Brocklin both knew Hubenthal from their days with the Los Angeles Rams organization. Hubenthal also designed the original Norseman logo.

From the team's debut in 1961 to 1995, the Vikings' logos and uniforms essentially remained the same. Reflecting Minnesota's Scandinavian cultural heritage, one of the team's two primary logos consists of a profile of a blond Norseman, while the other consists of a white Viking horn.

Minnesota Vikings wordmark (1982–2003)

The team's helmet is purple with a Viking horn logo on each side. Each horn is outlined in gold. The horn logo was slightly revised in 2006. The original uniform design consisted of white pants, gold trim, and either purple or white jerseys. On the jersey's sleeves was the Northwestern stripe pattern in white with gold trim. For the white uniform the stripes were purple with gold trim as well. From 1962 to 1964, the Vikings wore purple pants with their white jerseys (The Vikings, with their current uniform, still wear purple pants with yellow and white trim). In 1969, the design for the white uniforms had changed to a completely different stripe pattern, which was over the shoulders, then the purple ones, which were around the sleeve cuff. These unique shoulder stripes were first worn in 1969, the year they went to their first Super Bowl. There have also been minor changes to the uniform design throughout the years, such as changing the color of the face mask from gray to white in 1980, and then to purple in 1985. In addition, the Norseman logo was added to the sleeves in 1996, and the purple jersey stripes were toned down with that change. The TV numbers, previously located on the jersey sleeves, moved up to the shoulders as well that year. The Vikings continued to wear black shoes until Les Steckel became head coach in 1984; they were the last NFL team to make the change from black to white shoes. In 2006, the team returned to black shoes for the first time since the 1983 season.

The Vikings tweaked their Norseman logo, which involved updating the shading, altering the shape and base of the horns, thickening the mustache and face, making the gold tones brighter, and shortening the braid. The new logo was unveiled on February 14, 2013. On March 28, the team reported that new uniforms will be unveiled on April 25.

On April 25, 2013, the Minnesota Vikings unveiled the club's new uniforms during its annual NFL draft party.

From 1969 through 1973, the Vikings had an alternate purple jersey without stripes for warm-weather games.

The team's uniforms were redesigned in 2006, the first significant change in the franchise's 46-year history. Although the team colors remained the same, trim lines were added to the outside shoulders and sleeves, and the sides of the jerseys and pants. In addition, the horn on the helmet was slightly more defined. Included in the new design are both white and purple pants. The purple pants have not been regularly used since 2007, but resurfaced twice in 2010.

The team wore black armbands for the last four games in 1978 in memory of Jack "Jocko" Nelson, an assistant coach who died during the season. In 1985, the team wore a 25 years patch on their jerseys. In 1989, they wore a "40 for 60" patch honoring the 1969 NFL championship team. They wore a 35 years patch in 1995, 40 years in 2000 and 45 years in 2005. They also wore patches in 1999 for assistant coach Chip Myers who died in the offseason and in 2001 for Korey Stringer. The Vikings, like other teams, wore NFL 50th and 75th-anniversary patches in 1969 and 1994.

They also wore "TS" decals on their helmets in memory of Tony Sparano in the 2018 NFL season, their offensive-line coach who died before the season started.

On December 24, 2022, in a Week 16 game against the New York Giants, the Vikings wore all-white uniforms at home in the regular season for the first time. As part of the "Winter Whiteout" event, the team painted its logo and end zones white with purple accents, and encouraged fans at the stadium to wear white. The Vikings again wore the all-white uniforms at home against the Detroit Lions on December 24, 2023. On June 6, 2024, the Vikings unveiled a new alternate "Winter Warrior" uniform, which is all-white with purple and silver stripes and a new Vikings wordmark. The uniform is paired with an alternate white helmet, featuring a silver middle stripe and the traditional horn decal in silver trimmed in purple.

In 2023, the Vikings unveiled throwback uniforms based on the 1960s purple uniforms, which had gold trim on the numbers. However, the current matte purple helmet would be used, with gray facemasks and throwback horn decals.

In 2026, the Vikings unveiled a "Rivalries" uniform which they wore once per season at home against each of their NFC North opponents. Inspired by Viking culture, the uniforms featured a deep purple base in the helmets, uniforms and pants with ivory and metallic gold accents, incorporating Nordic knot striping and Rune symbols.

=== All-purple uniforms ===
On October 11, 1964, for a home game against the Detroit Lions, the Vikings decided to wear their road uniform of white jerseys and purple pants. However, the Lions mistakenly only brought their white jerseys to Minnesota. The game began with both teams wearing white, but it proved too confusing, and ahead of the second quarter, the Vikings changed into their purple jerseys. However, they did not change their pants, resulting in the first time the Vikings wore all-purple for a game. It was not until 43 years later, on December 17, 2007, (a Monday Night Football game against the Chicago Bears) that the Vikings again wore both purple jerseys and purple pants—the first time they wore all-purple intentionally. They repeated this three years later, the wearing all-purple for the November 7, 2010, home game against the Arizona Cardinals.

The NFL introduced "Color Rush" uniforms for all 32 teams in the 2016 season, specifically for Thursday Night Football games. The Vikings had an all-purple uniform with gold numbers and stripes on the pants, which made its only appearance as a Color Rush uniform in Week 13 at home against the Dallas Cowboys. After the program was discontinued in 2018, these uniforms have become the team's primary alternate and are now known under the name "Primetime Purple". However, the Vikings only wear these uniforms during home Thursday Night games. They wore the uniforms under the Primetime Purple name for the first time during a game against the Washington Redskins in 2019. In the team's Wild Card game against the New Orleans Saints during the 2019 season, the Vikings wore all purple again. However, instead of the regular alternates, they wore the regular home uniforms with the away purple pants. They wore the combination in games against the Saints in 2020 and 2022.

In 2020, the Primetime Purple uniforms made an appearance in a late-afternoon game against the Cowboys. The next season, they were worn for a Thursday Night home game against the Pittsburgh Steelers. The uniform was most recently worn during a Thanksgiving Day game against the New England Patriots in 2022.

=== All-white uniform ===
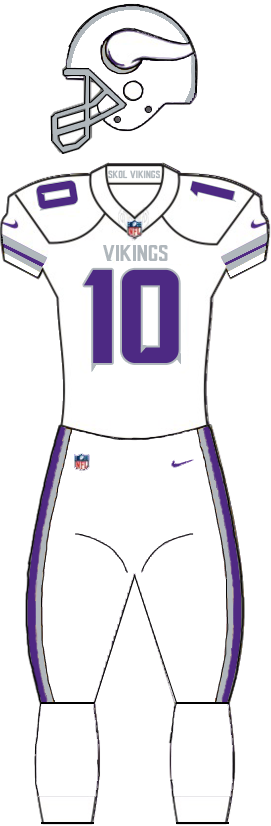

On June 6, 2024, the Minnesota Vikings unveiled an all-white "Winter Warrior" uniform. It features a white helmet with a satin finish and is adorned with a metallic gray stripe inspired by the metal stripping found on traditional Viking helmets. The uniform is based on the team's decision to wear their standard white jerseys and white pants for one game in both the 2022 and 2023 seasons, which the Vikings dubbed "Winter Whiteouts". This uniform is the first in Minnesota history to include a white helmet. These uniforms were worn for their 2024 Winter Whiteout game against the Bears.

== Team culture ==
=== Mascots ===
After several failed attempts at developing an official team-owned mascot, the Vikings finally introduced Viktor the Viking during the 2007 Vikings' season. Team officials had long indicated that they were after a mascot concept that would primarily appeal to the team's younger fan base. Viktor the Viking, a muscle-bound, blond-haired and mustachioed character, wears a Vikings' #1 jersey and an oversized Vikings helmet with protruding horns and a small yellow nose guard.

From 1970 to 1992, truck driver Hub Meeds dressed as a Viking and served as the team mascot. Meeds asked to become the mascot after being accidentally let onto the field by security during Super Bowl IV in New Orleans.

From 1994 to 2015, the team mascot was Ragnar (played by Joseph Juranitch) and was based on the legendary Viking Ragnar Lodbrok. Juranitch admits to being somewhat of an eccentric—he holds the current world record for fastest time shaving a beard with an axe, but has not shaved his beard since he won the Ragnar job among 3,000 applicants. Ragnar drove onto the field at the beginning of a game dressed in Viking garb, on a motorcycle, while a cheerleader used to ride a snowmobile. Although never one to shy away from confrontations with opposing players, notably Chad "Ochocinco" Johnson, he had a soft spot for Brett Favre while the quarterback started for the rival Green Bay Packers. In 2015, the Vikings announced that they were not able to reach a new contract agreement with Juranitch which he wanted $20,000 per game, and released him.

Another mascot associated with the Vikings was "Vikadontis Rex", a purple foam dinosaur. Vikadontis was the official mascot of the Minnesota Vikings Children's Fund and took part in the 1995 Celebrity Mascot Olympics. Vikadontis was retired starting with the 2000 season. The team also had an NFL Huddles mascot in the mid-1980s (somewhat similar to Viktor the Viking). Krazy George Henderson was also employed as a cheerleader from 1982 to 1985.

=== Fight song ===
"Skol, Vikings" is the fight song of the Minnesota Vikings. It was introduced around the time the team was founded in 1961. It is always played whenever the team scores a touchdown, field goal or safety, at the end of each half, and upon victory. The word skol is an anglicization of the Swedish, Danish, and Norwegian skål, meaning "cheers!"

=== Helga hats ===
Vikings fans are known to dress up in "Helga hats", purple hats with white horns and blonde braids, mimicking the helmets popularly believed to have been worn by Viking warriors. The original Helga Hats are still hand assembled in the Twin Cities area.

=== Vikings horn ===
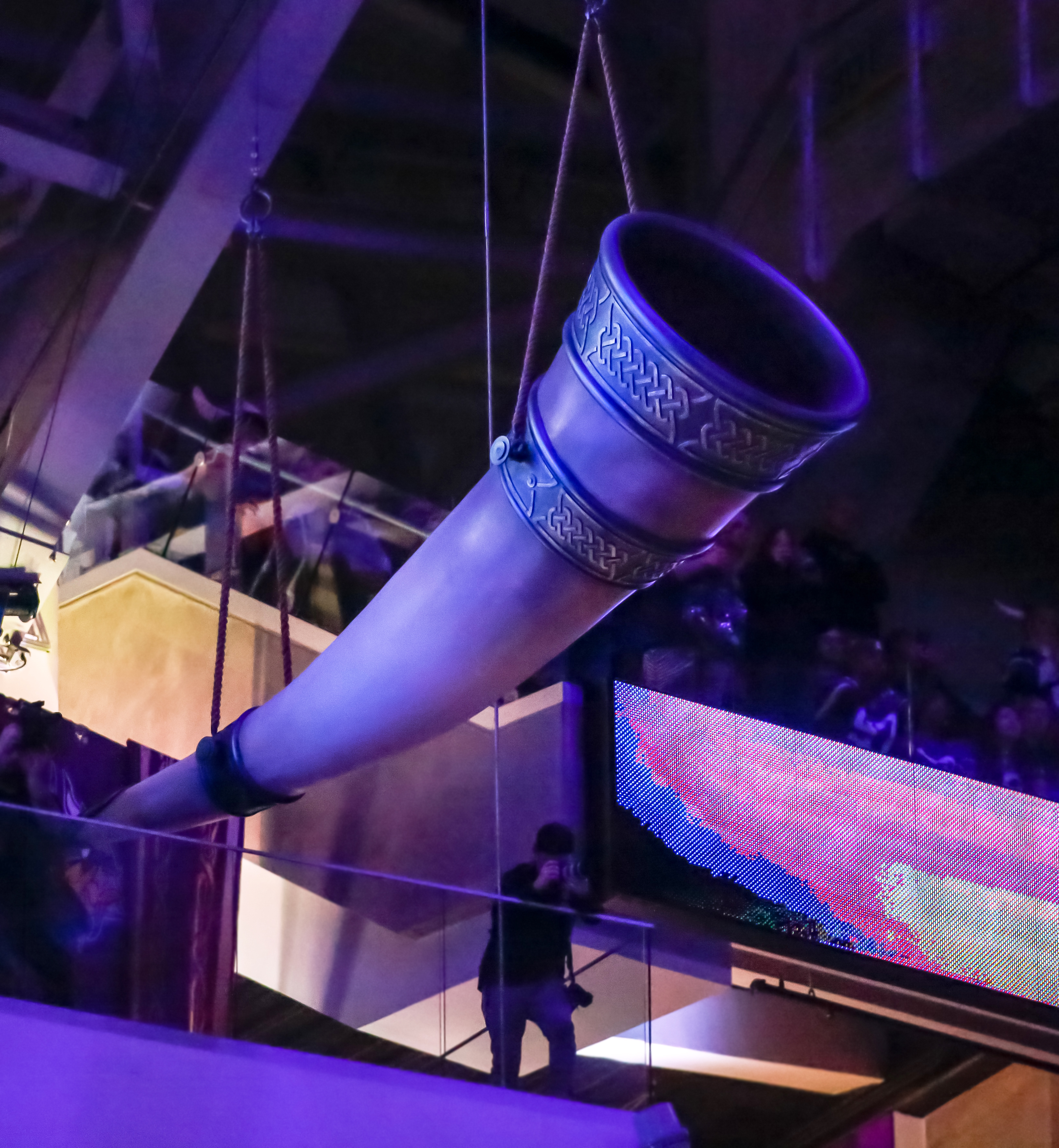
The gjallarhorn at U.S. Bank Stadium

During home games, the Vikings' Gjallarhorn is played during its pre-game ceremonies, a tradition that started in 2007. The ceremony has been an opportunity to honor past Viking greats (most notably Randy Moss) along with Minnesota-related folks (such as the Minnesota Duluth Bulldogs men's ice hockey team when they won the NCAA hockey championship). The first horn broke right before the playing of the 2016 playoff game in Minnesota versus the Seattle Seahawks, owing to below-zero temperatures (at the time, the Vikings were playing at Huntington Bank Stadium, an outdoor stadium) that cracked it. Both the first and second horns were created by Todd Johnson, a general manager at a music store.

=== Skol Chant ===
The Skol Chant is a cheer that is used in U.S. Bank Stadium for Minnesota Vikings games. It involves fans clapping their hands above their heads and yelling "skol" in response to the beat of a drum. The chant is a modified take on the "Viking war chant" used by supporters of the Iceland national football team at UEFA Euro 2016.

=== Association with Prince ===
Prince, a native of Minneapolis, was a lifelong Vikings fan and recorded the song "Purple and Gold" for the team in 2010. After the musician’s passing in 2016, the Vikings adopted his Billboard Hot 100 number-one hit “Let's Go Crazy” as its touchdown song.

== Rivalries ==
=== Divisional ===
==== Chicago Bears ====
The Vikings' rivalry with the Chicago Bears began when the Vikings entered the league as an expansion team in 1961. The first time these two teams met, the Vikings managed an upset over the Bears 37–13 in Minnesota. Both teams are members of the NFC North, and play at least twice a year. The Vikings lead the overall series 65–57–2. The teams have met once in the postseason, a 35–18 Bears win in the 1994 Wild Card Round.

==== Detroit Lions ====
The Vikings and Detroit Lions have played twice annually since the Vikings entered the league's Western Conference in 1961. The two teams moved to the NFC Central after the AFL-NFL merger in 1970, which became the NFC North after the NFL's 2002 realignment. This is the only NFC North rivalry without any head-to-head postseason meetings. The Vikings lead the all-time series 80–41–2.

==== Green Bay Packers ====
The rivalry between the Vikings and the Green Bay Packers began in 1961, similarly to their other divisional rivalries. Much like other Minnesota-Wisconsin sports rivalries, such as that between the Wisconsin Badgers and Minnesota Golden Gophers. It is also considered to be the most widely acknowledged rivalry within NFC North. Events such as Randy Moss mooning the Green Bay crowd in the first playoff game between these two teams (won by the Vikings), and former Packer great Brett Favre's move to the Vikings have created more resentment between these teams. The Packers lead the all-time series 66–60–3, despite the two teams splitting their two playoff contests.

=== Conference ===
==== New Orleans Saints ====
The Vikings have developed a heated NFC rivalry with the New Orleans Saints, who have become known as the Vikings' biggest out-of-division rival. The Vikings lead the overall series 23–13, including 4–1 in the playoffs. This rivalry has featured many notable playoff matchups, such as the 2009 NFC Championship Game and the 2017 NFC Divisional Round game.

=== Historic ===
==== Dallas Cowboys ====
The rivalry between the Cowboys and the Vikings heated up during the 1970s, with several of their games impacting the NFC playoff race during that decade. The Cowboys lead the all-time series 19–15, including a 4–3 record against the Vikings in the playoffs.

==== Los Angeles Rams ====
The Vikings' rivalry with the Los Angeles Rams was most heated in the 1970s when the two teams faced off in many consequential playoff games. To-date, the Vikings are the Rams' second most played playoff opponent with seven games, and the Rams are tied with the Cowboys as the most played playoff opponent for the Vikings. The Vikings lead the all-time series 27–18–1 and are 5–2 in the playoffs.

== Players ==
=== Current roster ===
Minnesota Vikings roster
Quarterbacks (QB): 12 Max Brosmer; 8 Kirk Cousins; 1 Kyler Murray; 11 Carson Wentz; Running backs (RB): 45 Max Bredeson FB; 31 DeeJay Dallas; 33 Aaron Jones; 27 Jordan Mason; Wide receivers (WR): 3 Jordan Addison; 13 Tai Felton; 18 Justin Jefferson; 14 Jauan Jennings; 82 Jeshaun Jones; 4 Myles Price RS; Tight ends (TE): 86 Gavin Bartholomew; 87 T. J. Hockenson; 85 Ben Yurosek	Offensive linemen (OL): 64 Blake Brandel C; 71 Christian Darrisaw T; 76 Will Fries G; 60 Joe Huber G; 65 Michael Jurgens C; 75 Brian O'Neill T; 78 Caleb Tiernan T; 72 Ryan Van Demark T; Defensive linemen (DL): 95 Caleb Banks; 90 Tyrion Ingram-Dawkins; 97 Domonique Orange; 61 Jalen Redmond; 50 Levi Drake Rodriguez; 99 Elijah Williams	Linebackers (LB): 51 Blake Cashman; 32 Chaz Chambliss OLB; 41 Jake Golday; 0 Ivan Pace Jr.; 15 Dallas Turner OLB; 43 Andrew Van Ginkel OLB; 17 Kyle Van Noy OLB; 55 Eric Wilson; Defensive backs (DB): 20 Charles Demmings CB; 26 Theo Jackson S; 44 Josh Metellus S; 7 Byron Murphy CB; 23 James Pierre CB; 2 Isaiah Rodgers CB; 22 Harrison Smith S; 29 Jacob Thomas S; 6 Jakobe Thomas S; 5 Zemaiah Vaughn CB; 24 Jay Ward S; Special teams (ST): 42 Andrew DePaola LS; 16 Will Reichard K; 19 Brett Thorson P	Practice squad: 38 Da'Veawn Armstead CB; 57 Keshawn Banks OLB; 34 Damon Bankston RB; 36 Macéo Beard S (IPP); 9 Odell Beckham Jr. WR; 37 D'Anthony Bell S; 89 Dillon Bell WR; 81 Michael Briscoe WR (PS/I); 68 Henry Byrd G; 83 Devin Culp TE; 54 Kenny Dyson OLB; 25 D'Wayne Eskridge WR; 59 Bangally Kamara LB; 79 Jack Nelson T; 67 Josh Priebe G; 96 Jahvaree Ritzie DT; 56 Josh Ross LB; 52 Jihad Ward OLB; Reserve: -- Jamal Adams LB (IR); 92 Tyler Batty OLB (IR); 21 Demond Claiborne RB (IR); 74 Donovan Jackson G (IR); 84 Josh Oliver TE (IR); 98 Bo Richter OLB (IR); 62 Nick Samac C (IR) 53 active, 16 practice squad (1 IPP), 8 reserve As of November 18, 2026. Rookies in italics.; Roster; Depth chart; Transactions

=== Retired numbers ===
Minnesota Vikings retired numbers
No.	Player	Position	Tenure	Retired
10	Fran Tarkenton	QB	1961–1966; 1972–1978	October 7, 1979
53	Mick Tingelhoff	C	1962–1978	November 25, 2001
70	Jim Marshall	DE	1961–1979	November 28, 1999
77^{†}	Korey Stringer	OT	1995–2000	November 19, 2001
80	Cris Carter	WR	1990–2001	September 14, 2003
88	Alan Page	DT	1967–1978	September 25, 1988

- ^{†} = Posthumous

=== Pro Football Hall of Famers ===
Minnesota Vikings Hall of Famers
Players
No.	Name	Position(s)	Tenure	Inducted
1	Warren Moon	QB	1994–1996	2006
3	Jan Stenerud	K	1984–1985	1991
4	Brett Favre	QB	2009–2010	2016
7	Morten Andersen	K	2004	2017
10	Fran Tarkenton	QB	1961–1966; 1972–1978	1986
22	Paul Krause	S	1968–1979	1998
33	Roger Craig	RB	1992–1993	2026
39	Hugh McElhenny	RB	1961–1962	1970
44	Dave Casper	TE	1983	2002
53	Mick Tingelhoff	C	1962–1978	2015
56	Chris Doleman	DE	1985–1993, 1999	2012
58	Jim Langer	C	1980–1981	1987
64	Randall McDaniel	G	1988–1999	2009
65	Gary Zimmerman	OT	1986–1992	2008
69	Jared Allen	DE	2008–2013	2025
73	Ron Yary	OT	1968–1981	2001
76	Steve Hutchinson	G	2006–2011	2020
80	Cris Carter	WR	1990–2001	2013
81	Carl Eller	DE	1964–1978	2004
84	Randy Moss	WR	1998–2004, 2010	2018
88	Alan Page	DT	1967–1978	1988
93	John Randle	DT	1990–2000	2010
Coaches and Executives
Name		Position(s)	Tenure	Inducted
Jim Finks		GM	1964–1973	1995
Bud Grant		HC	1967–1983, 1985	1994

Italics = played only a minor portion of their career with the Vikings, and are recognized primarily based upon achievements with other teams

=== Ring of Honor ===
Elected to the Pro Football Hall of Fame

Minnesota Vikings Ring of Honor
Players
No.	Name	Position(s)	Tenure	Inducted
10	Fran Tarkenton	QB	1961–1966; 1972–1978	September 9, 1998
20	Bobby Bryant	CB	1967–1980	September 22, 2024
22	Paul Krause	S	1968–1979	November 15, 1998
28	Ahmad Rashad	WR	1976–1982	October 1, 2017
28	Adrian Peterson	RB	2007–2016	November 9, 2026
30	Bill Brown	RB	1962–1974	September 26, 2004
44	Chuck Foreman	RB	1973–1979	September 30, 2007
47	Joey Browner	S	1983–1991	October 27, 2013
53	Mick Tingelhoff	C	1962–1978	November 25, 2001
55	Scott Studwell	LB	1977–1990	November 29, 2009
56	Chris Doleman	DE	1985–1993, 1999	October 23, 2011
59	Matt Blair	LB	1974–1985	October 25, 2012
64	Randall McDaniel	G	1988–1999	December 17, 2006
69	Jared Allen	DE	2008–2013	October 30, 2022
70	Jim Marshall	DE	1961–1979	November 28, 1999
73	Ron Yary	OT	1968–1981	September 9, 2001
77	Korey Stringer	OT	1995–2000	November 19, 2001
80	Cris Carter	WR	1990–2001	September 14, 2003
81	Carl Eller	DE	1964–1978	November 10, 2002
83	Steve Jordan	TE	1982–1994	October 24, 2019
84	Randy Moss	WR	1998–2004, 2010	September 11, 2017
88	Alan Page	DT	1967–1978	September 20, 1998
93	John Randle	DT	1990–2000	November 30, 2008
93	Kevin Williams	DT	2003–2013	October 3, 2021
Coaches and Executives
Name		Position(s)	Tenure	Inducted
Jerry Burns		HC	1986–1991	November 6, 2005
Jim Finks		GM	1964–1973	October 18, 1998
Bud Grant		HC	1967–1983, 1985	November 8, 1998
Dennis Green		HC	1992–2001	September 23, 2018
Fred Zamberletti		Medical adviser	1961–2011	December 20, 1998

=== 25th Anniversary Team (1985) ===
- Fran Tarkenton QB, #10
- Bill Brown RB, #30
- Chuck Foreman RB, #44
- Ahmad Rashad WR, #28
- Sammy White WR, #85
- Stu Voigt TE, #83
- Ron Yary OT, #73
- Grady Alderman OT, #67
- Ed White G, #62
- Milt Sunde G, #64
- Mick Tingelhoff C, #53
- Jim Marshall DE, #70
- Alan Page DT, #88
- Gary Larsen DT, #77
- Carl Eller DE, #81
- Matt Blair OLB, #59
- Scott Studwell ILB, #55
- Jeff Siemon ILB, #50
- Roy Winston OLB, #60
- Bobby Bryant CB, #20
- Ed Sharockman CB, #45
- Paul Krause S, #22
- Karl Kassulke S, #29
- Fred Cox K, #14
- Greg Coleman P, #8
- Bud Grant HC

=== 40th Anniversary Team (2000) ===
- Fran Tarkenton QB, #10
- Chuck Foreman RB, #44
- Robert Smith RB, #26
- Ahmad Rashad WR, #28
- Cris Carter WR, #80
- Steve Jordan TE, #83
- Ron Yary OT, #73
- Randall McDaniel OG, #64
- Mick Tingelhoff C, #53
- Ed White OG, #62
- Tim Irwin OT, #76
- Jim Marshall DE, #70
- Alan Page DT, #88
- John Randle DT, #93
- Carl Eller DE, #81
- Matt Blair LB, #59
- Scott Studwell LB, #55
- Jeff Siemon LB, #50
- Bobby Bryant CB, #20
- Carl Lee CB, #39
- Paul Krause S, #22
- Joey Browner S, #47
- Greg Coleman P, #8
- Fred Cox K, #14
- Darrin Nelson KR, #20
- Bill Brown ST, #30

=== 50 Greatest Vikings (2010) ===
In connection with the team's 50th anniversary, the Vikings announced a group of 50 top players on December 19, 2010.

- Grady Alderman OT, #67
- Jared Allen DE, #69
- Matt Birk C, #75/78
- Matt Blair LB, #59
- Bill Brown RB, #30
- Joey Browner S, #47
- Bobby Bryant CB, #20
- Anthony Carter WR, #81
- Cris Carter WR, #80
- Fred Cox K, #14
- Daunte Culpepper QB, #11
- Chris Doleman DE/LB, #56
- Carl Eller DE, #81
- Chuck Foreman RB, #44
- John Gilliam WR, #42
- Bud Grant Coach
- Wally Hilgenberg LB, #58
- Steve Hutchinson G #76
- Tim Irwin OT, #76
- Steve Jordan TE, #83
- Tommy Kramer QB, #9
- Paul Krause S, #22
- Gary Larsen DT, #77
- Carl Lee CB, #39
- Jim Marshall DE, #70
- Randall McDaniel G, #64
- Keith Millard DT, #75
- Randy Moss WR, #84
- Dave Osborn RB, #41
- Alan Page DT, #88
- Adrian Peterson RB, #28
- John Randle DT, #93
- Ahmad Rashad WR, #28
- Ed Sharockman CB, #45
- Jeff Siemon LB, #50
- Robert Smith RB, #20/26
- Scott Studwell LB, #55
- Doug Sutherland DT, #69
- Fran Tarkenton QB, #10
- Henry Thomas DT, #97
- Mick Tingelhoff C, #53
- Stu Voigt TE, #83
- Gene Washington WR, #84
- Ed White G, #62
- Sammy White WR, #85
- Kevin Williams DT, #93
- Antoine Winfield CB, #26
- Roy Winston LB, #60
- Ron Yary OT, #73
- Gary Zimmerman OT, #65

=== All-Mall of America Field Team (2013) ===
In 2013, in recognition of their final season at the Metrodome, the Vikings organized a fan vote to determine the best players at each position to play for the team in their time at the stadium. They named 12 players on offense, 11 on defense, four special teams players and a head coach.

Offense

- QB – #11 Daunte Culpepper, 1999–2005
- RB – #28 Adrian Peterson, 2007–2013
- RB – #26 Robert Smith, 1993–2000
- WR – #81 Anthony Carter, 1985–1993
- WR – #80 Cris Carter, 1990–2001
- WR – #84 Randy Moss, 1998–2004, 2010
- TE – #83 Steve Jordan, 1982–1994
- OT – #76 Tim Irwin, 1981–1993
- OT – #65 Gary Zimmerman, 1986–1992
- OG – #76 Steve Hutchinson, 2006–2011
- OG – #64 Randall McDaniel, 1988–1999
- C – #78 Matt Birk, 1998–2008

Defense

- DE – #69 Jared Allen, 2008–2013
- DE – #56 Chris Doleman, 1985–1993, 1999
- DT – #93 John Randle, 1990–2000
- DT – #93 Kevin Williams, 2003–2013
- LB – #52 Chad Greenway, 2006–2013
- LB – #58 Ed McDaniel, 1992–2001
- LB – #55 Scott Studwell, 1977–1990
- CB – #39 Carl Lee, 1983–1993
- CB – #26 Antoine Winfield, 2004–2012
- S – #24 Robert Griffith, 1994–2001
- S – #47 Joey Browner, 1983–1991

Special teams

- K – #8 Ryan Longwell, 2006–2011
- P – #5/#4 Chris Kluwe, 2005–2012
- KR – #12 Percy Harvin (WR), 2009–2012
- ST – #81 Chris Walsh (WR), 1994–2002

Head coach

- HC – Dennis Green, 1992–2001

== Coaches ==
=== Head coaches ===
The Vikings have had ten head coaches in franchise history. Bud Grant served two non-consecutive stints as head coach.

Minnesota Vikings head coaches
Name	Years	Won	Lost	Ties	Winning %	Postseason
Norm Van Brocklin	1961–1966	29	51	4	.345	—
Bud Grant	1967–1983, 1985	158	96	5	.610	1968–71, 1973–78, 1980, 1982
Les Steckel	1984	3	13	0	.188	—
Jerry Burns	1986–1991	52	43	0	.547	1987–89
Dennis Green	1992–2001	97	62	0	.610	1992–94, 1996–2000
Mike Tice	2001–2005	32	33	0	.492	2004
Brad Childress	2006–2010	39	35	0	.527	2008, 2009
Leslie Frazier	2010–2013	21	32	1	.398	2012
Mike Zimmer	2014–2021	72	56	1	.562	2015, 2017, 2019
Kevin O'Connell	2022–present	43	24	0	.641	2022, 2024
Total		546	445	11	.554	32

=== Current staff ===
Minnesota Vikings staff
Front office: Owner/chairman – Zygi Wilf; Owner/vice chairman – Leonard Wilf; Owner/president – Mark Wilf; Chief operating officer – Andrew Miller; Executive vice president of football operations – Rob Brzezinski; General manager – Nolan Teasley; Assistant general manager – Andrew Healy; Assistant general manager – Trent Kirchner; Director of scouting strategy – Tyler Hamblin; Football advisor – Ryan Pace; Director of player personnel – Ryan Monnens; Assistant director of player personnel – Chisom Opara; Director of pro personnel – Sam DeLuca; Assistant director of pro personnel – Azzaam Kapadia; Director of college scouting – Mike Sholiton; Senior manager, football administration – Emily Badis; Director of football quantitative methods – Chris French; Head coaches: Head coach – Kevin O'Connell; Assistant head coach – Frank Smith; Offensive coaches: Offensive coordinator – Wes Phillips; Assistant offensive coordinator – Chris O'Hara; Offensive passing game coordinator/quarterbacks – Josh McCown; Assistant quarterbacks/passing game specialist – Jordan Traylor; Offensive running game coordinator/running backs – Curtis Modkins; Wide receivers – Keenan McCardell; Assistant wide receivers – Derron Montgomery; Tight ends/game management coordinator – Ryan Cordell; Offensive line – Keith Carter; Assistant offensive line – Derek Warehime; Offensive assistant – Ben Ellefson; Offensive quality control – Kyle Caskey	Defensive coaches: Defensive coordinator – Brian Flores; Defensive running game coordinator – Ryan Nielsen; Assistant defensive line – Patrick Hill; Outside linebackers – Thad Bogardus; Senior defensive assistant/inside linebackers – Mike Siravo; Assistant linebackers – Dalmin Gibson; Defensive passing game coordinator/defensive backs – Gerald Alexander; Assistant defensive backs – Chenzo Funari; Defensive assistant – Charlie Frye, Will Johnson; Special teams coaches: Special teams coordinator – Matt Daniels; Assistant special teams coordinator – Chili Davis; Strength and conditioning: Vice president, player health and performance – Tyler Williams; Director of sports medicine – Matt Duhamel; Associate head athletic trainer – Connor Whicker; Head performance dietician – Ben Hawkins; Head strength coach – Joe Distor Jr.; → Coaching staff → Front office → More NFL staffs

== Radio and television ==
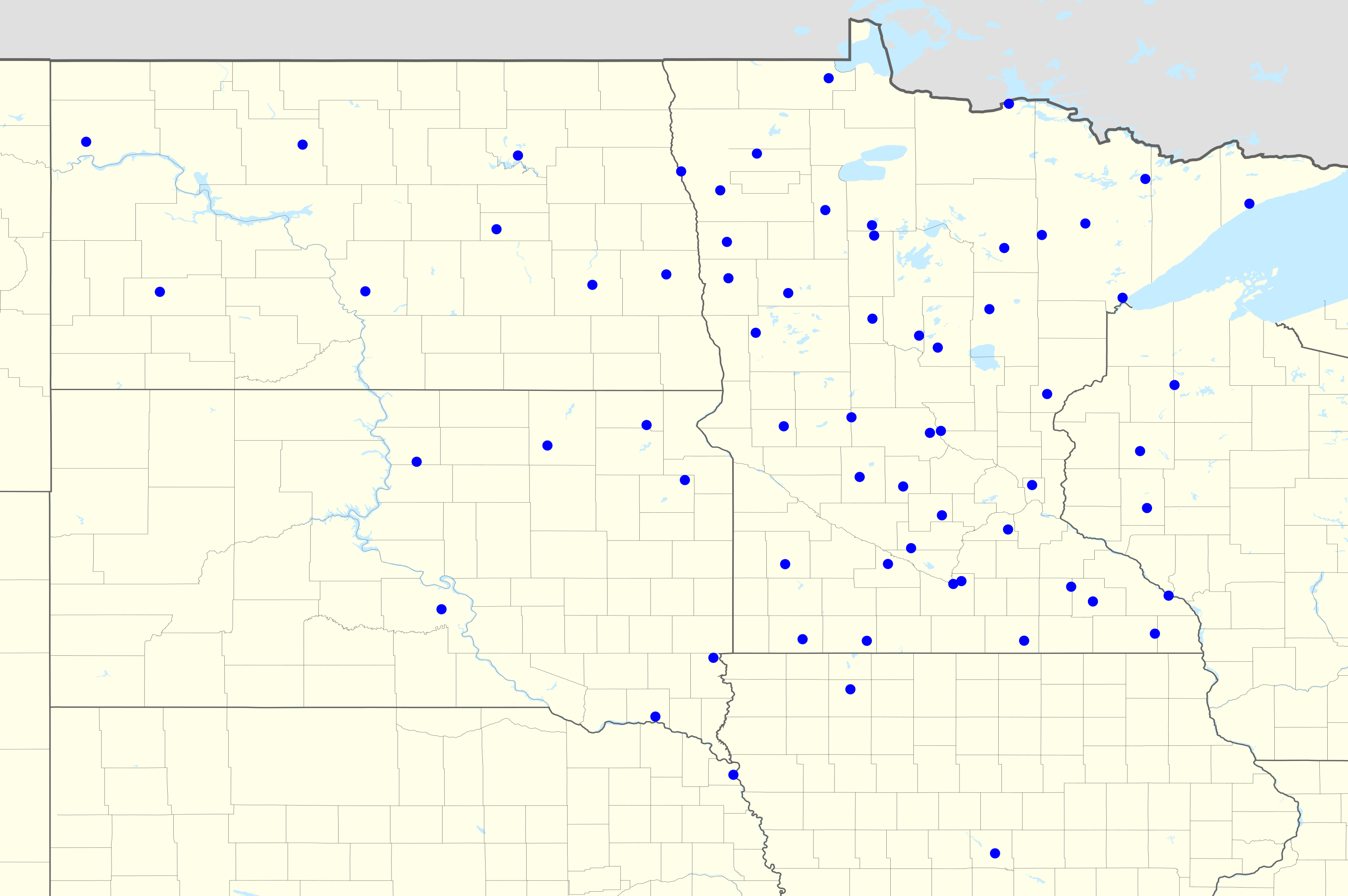
Map of radio affiliates

The Vikings' flagship radio station is KFXN-FM (100.3), which uses the branding "KFAN" based on its former calls on 1130 AM before a format flip between the AM and FM stations before the 2011 season. 1130 AM also continues to broadcast game play-by-play as KTLK.

The games are also heard on the "KFAN Radio Network" in Minnesota, Wisconsin, Iowa, South Dakota, and North Dakota, as well as many other outlets. Paul Allen has been the play-by-play announcer since the 2002 NFL season with Pete Bercich filling in as analyst, who began his first season in 2007.

Telecasts of preseason games not shown on national networks are aired on KMSP (Channel 9) in the Twin Cities with a simulcast of KFAN's radio broadcast while Fox Sports North shows a tape delay later.

=== Radio affiliates ===
Minnesota

City	Call sign	Frequency
Aitkin	KKIN-FM	94.3 FM
Albert Lea	KQPR	96.1 FM
Alexandria	KIKV	100.7 FM
Bemidji	KBUN	1450 AM
Bemidji	KBHP	101.1 FM
Benson	KSCR	93.5 FM
Blue Earth	KBEW	98.1 FM
Brainerd	KBLB	93.3 FM
Crookston	KROX	1260 AM
Dassel	KARP	106.9 FM
Detroit Lakes	KBOT	104.1 FM
Detroit Lakes	KDLM	1340 AM
Duluth	KJOQ	1490 AM
Duluth	KQDS	94.9 FM
Ely	WELY	1450 AM
Ely	WELY	94.5 FM
Eveleth	KRBT	1340 AM
Fergus Falls	KBRF	1250 AM
Frazee	KDLB	94.5 FM
Grand Rapids	KMFY	96.9 FM
Hibbing	WNMT	650 AM
International Falls	KSDM	104.1 FM
Jackson	KUXX	105.7 FM
Mankato	KFSP	1230 AM
Mankato	KNUJ	105.9 FM
Mankato	KXLP	94.1 FM
Marshall	KARL	105.1 FM
Morris	KKOK	95.7 FM
New Ulm	KNUJ	107.3 FM
Pine City	WCMP	100.9 FM
Rochester	KFAN	1270 AM
Rochester	KRCH	101.7 FM
Roseau	KCAJ	102.1 FM
St. Cloud	WJON	1240 AM
Spring Grove	KQYB	98.3 FM
Thief River Falls	KTRF	1230 AM
Twin Cities	KFXN	100.3 FM
Twin Cities	KTLK	1130 AM
Wadena	KSKK	1070 AM
Waseca	KFOW	1170 AM
Willmar	KWLM	1340 AM
Willmar	K242CF	96.3 FM
Winona	KWNO	1230 AM
Worthington	KWOA	730 AM

Iowa

City	Call sign	Frequency
Des Moines	KXNO	1460 AM
Sioux City	KMNS	620 AM
Spencer	KICD	1240 AM
Spencer	K252EX	98.3 FM
Mason City	KLKK	103.7 FM

North Dakota

City	Call sign	Frequency
Bismarck	KXMR	710 AM
Carrington	KDAK	1600 AM
Devils Lake	KDLR	1240 AM
Dickinson	KLTC	1460 AM
Fargo	KFGO	790 AM
Fargo	KFGO	104.7 FM
Grand Forks	KKXL	1440 AM
Jamestown	KQDJ	1400 AM
Jamestown	K246AM	97.1 FM
Minot	KRRZ	1390 AM
Oakes	KDDR	1220 AM
Oakes	K240CJ	95.9 FM
Valley City	KOVC	1490 AM
Williston	KEYZ	660 AM

South Dakota

City	Call sign	Frequency
Aberdeen	KGIM	1420 AM
Aberdeen	K296FW	107.1 FM
Milbank	KMSD	1510 AM
Milbank	K252FB	98.3 FM
Mobridge	KMLO	100.7 FM
Pierre	KPLO	94.5 FM
Sioux Falls	KWSN	1230 AM
Sioux Falls	K251BH	98.1 FM
Sisseton	KBWS	102.9 FM
Watertown	KPHR	106.3 FM
Yankton	WNAX	570 AM
Yankton	K260BO	99.9 FM

Wisconsin

City	Call sign	Frequency
Amery	WZEZ	104.9 FM
Eau Claire	WMEQ	880 AM
Eau Claire	W292EG	106.3 FM
Hayward	WHSM	101.1 FM
Rice Lake	WKFX	99.1 FM

== See also ==
- Pro Football Hall of Fame
- List of Minnesota Vikings starting quarterbacks
- List of Minnesota Vikings head coaches
- List of Minnesota Vikings first-round draft picks
- Minnesota Vikings draft history
- List of Minnesota Vikings broadcasters

== Notes ==
Preceded by Baltimore Colts	NFL champions 1969	Succeeded by Baltimore Colts (as first Super Bowl champions post-AFL–NFL merger)
