= Les Steckel =

American football player and coach (born 1946)

Personal information
- Born: July 1, 1946 (age 80); Whitehall, Pennsylvania, U.S.

Career information
- High school: Whitehall
- College: Kansas

Career history
- San Francisco 49ers (1978) Wide receivers coach; Minnesota Vikings (1979–1983) Wide receivers coach; Minnesota Vikings (1984) Head coach; New England Patriots (1985–1988) Quarterbacks coach/wide receivers coach; Brown (1989) Offensive coordinator; Colorado (1991) Wide receivers coach; Colorado (1992) Offensive coordinator; Denver Broncos (1993–1994) Tight ends coach; Houston Oilers (1995–1996) Wide receivers coach/tight ends coach; Tennessee Oilers (1997) Offensive coordinator/quarterbacks coach; Tennessee Oilers/Titans (1998–1999) Offensive coordinator; Tampa Bay Buccaneers (2000) Offensive coordinator; Buffalo Bills (2003) Running backs coach; Centre (2021) Offensive coordinator/quarterbacks coach

Head coaching record
- Regular season: 3–13 (.188)
- Career: 3–13 (.188)
- Coaching profile at Pro Football Reference

Les Steckel (born July 1, 1946) is a retired American football coach. He was the third head coach of the Minnesota Vikings in 1984, and also worked as an assistant coach with the San Francisco 49ers, New England Patriots, Denver Broncos, Houston Oilers/Tennessee Titans, Buffalo Bills and Tampa Bay Buccaneers.

== Early life ==
Steckel was born in Whitehall, Pennsylvania and attended the University of Kansas, where he was a Golden Gloves boxing champion and graduated in 1968 with a triple degree in social work, human relations, and political science. He volunteered on the Robert F. Kennedy presidential campaign that year.

He then enlisted in the Marines and served in Vietnam as infantry. He retired from the Marine Reserves after thirty years of service with the rank of colonel.

After his return from Vietnam in 1970, Steckel was stationed in Quantico, Virginia, where he played football for the Quantico Marines football team until 1971. He joined the USMC Reserves in 1972.

== Coaching career ==
Steckel then worked as an assistant football coach at the University of Colorado from 1973 to 1976. He was an assistant at Navy in 1977, then an assistant with the San Francisco 49ers in 1978.

Steckel joined the Minnesota Vikings coaching staff as the receivers coach in 1979 and remained an assistant coach through the 1983 season. When longtime head coach Bud Grant retired after the 1983 season, Steckel was promoted as his successor over longtime offensive coordinator Jerry Burns, making him the youngest coach in the NFL at the time. As a coach with a military background, Steckel emphasized discipline. His practices, such as using Marine-style exercise machines, did not sit well with a number of players; according to longtime Star Tribune columnist Sid Hartman, they essentially mutinied against Steckel during the season. He was fired after one season, in which the team posted a 3–13 record. He was succeeded by Grant, who briefly came out of retirement to fill the post.

He later worked as an assistant coach or coordinator with the New England Patriots from 1985 to 1988, then with Brown University in 1989, followed by another two years at the University of Colorado from 1991 to 1992. He returned to the NFL with the Denver Broncos from 1993 to 1994, followed by five years with the Houston Oilers/Tennessee Titans, where he helped lead them to Super Bowl XXXIV as offensive coordinator. In a surprise move, Steckel left the Titans just three weeks later to become offensive coordinator of Tampa Bay Buccaneers in 2000. The result was the Bucs' highest-scoring season ever, a 10–6 record, and a trip to the playoffs. Despite his transformation of the team's offense, Steckel's play-calling caused friction with his players, and there were rumors of a feud between him and defensive coordinator Monte Kiffin. Less than one year on the job, he was fired after the Bucs lost 21–3 to the Philadelphia Eagles in the NFC Wild Card Game. His final year of professional coaching was with the Buffalo Bills in 2003. During the 2002 season, Steckel served as an assistant coach for his son Luke's high school team, going on to win the Tennessee state high school championship. On March 1, 2005, he became president of the Fellowship of Christian Athletes, a position he held for 12 years until his retirement in 2017.

In January 2021, Steckel joined the coaching staff at Centre College, in Danville, Kentucky, as the team's quarterbacks coach. Shortly after joining the team, Centre College's offensive coordinator Ben Fox left to become the head coach for Maryville College. Steckel was then promoted to offensive coordinator, and he left the team after the season. The Colonels finished the season 2-2 while averaging 31.5 points per game. Trentin Dupper, the Colonels' quarterback, earned the Southern Athletic Association Newcomer of the Year award under Steckel's tutelage.

== Personal life ==
He is married to Chris Steckel (née Pickett), and they have three children: Lesley, a graduate of Baylor University, Luke Steckel, a former football player at Princeton University and current Tight Ends coach for the Las Vegas Raiders, and Christian, a graduate of Baylor, and current reporter and host for Bally Sports Southwest. Les's brother, Dave Steckel, is the former head coach of the Missouri State Bears football team and previously served under Gary Pinkel at Missouri. Dave served as the defensive coordinator for the team when they won back-to-back SEC East championships in 2013 and 2014.

== Head coaching record ==
Team	Year	Regular season					Postseason			
Team	Year	Won	Lost	Ties	Win %	Finish	Won	Lost	Win %	Result
MIN	1984	3	13	0	.188		–	–	–	–
MIN total		3	13	0	.188		–	–	–	–
Total		3	13	0	.188		–	–	–	–
