= Bill Boyer =

American businessman (died 1973)

Edgar William Boyer (January 16, 1906 – February 19, 1973) was an American businessman who was a founder of the Minnesota Vikings.

== Early life ==
Boyer was born in Minneapolis on January 16, 1906. He graduated from North Community High School and took night classes at the University of Minnesota for two years.

== Ford Motor Company ==
In 1924, he began working for the Ford Motor Company in St. Paul, Minnesota. He rose through the company, becoming its are sales manager in 1935. In 1936, he moved to Milwaukee to become Ford's wholesale manager. He became retail manager in 1937 and the following year was put in charge used car sales nationwide. When World War II broke out, Boyer was put in charge of Ford's Indianapolis branch. In 1943, Boyer became a partner in J. W. Gilfillan's Ford dealership in Minneapolis. He bought out Gilfillan's shares in 1964 and the dealership was renamed Bill Boyer Ford.

== Minnesota Vikings ==
In 1959, Boyer, Max Winter, and H. P. Skoglund were awarded the Minneapolis-St. Paul franchise in the new American Football League. In an effort to fight back against the new league, Chicago Bears owner George Halas proposed adding Dallas and Houston to the NFL. However, the ownership group for the proposed Houston franchise backed out after they were unable to find a suitable stadium, which led Boyer's group to withdraw from the AFL and apply for an NFL franchise. On January 28, 1960, Minneapolis was awarded an expansion franchise that would begin playing in 1961.

Boyer served as president of the Minnesota Vikings from 1960 to 1965, and a vice president until his death. He died at the age of 67 on February 19, 1973, at Palm Springs, California. He was buried in Lakewood Cemetery in Minneapolis.

Boyer helped start the National Football League's Punt, Pass, and Kick competition by presenting the idea, which was conceived by National Football League Properties employee Carl Schroeder, to the league and the Ford Motor Company.
