= Max Winter =

American sports executive

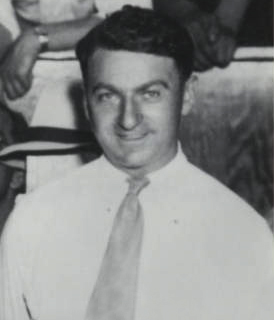
Max Winter

Max Winter (June 29, 1903 – July 26, 1996) was a Minneapolis businessman and sport executive who helped found the Minnesota Vikings.

== Biography ==
Winter was born in Ostrava, Austria-Hungary (modern day Czech Republic). He emigrated with his family and settled in Minneapolis, Minnesota. He graduated from North High School in Minneapolis in 1922 (see North High Polaris for 1922). He attended Hamline University on a basketball scholarship.

Winter opened The 620 Club in 1934 with his brother Henry and boxing manager/promoter Ernie Fliegel as equal partners. Located at 620 Hennepin Avenue in downtown Minneapolis, the restaurant specialized in turkey. The club was sold in 1971 and revamped the same year to become Moby Dick's bar (aka "Moby's).

In 1947, Winter became part owner with Ben Berger, Sid Hartman, and Morris Chalfen and assumed the general manager duties of the new Minneapolis Lakers in the National Basketball League. By the mid-1950s, Winter was interested in attracting a pro football team to Minneapolis. He attempted to get an expansion team in the National Football League; when that failed Winter and his partners joined with the newly created American Football League in the fall of 1959.

By 1960, with creation of the AFL, the NFL decided to expand to both Dallas and Minneapolis-St. Paul. Minnesota was granted an NFL franchise at the league owners' meetings in Miami on January 28, 1960. Winter and his group, out of the AFL and received an NFL expansion team that began in the 1961 season. The team was named the Minnesota Vikings on September 27, 1960. The founding group consisted of Max Winter, Bill Boyer, H. P. Skoglund, Ole Haugsrud and Bernard H. Ridder Jr.

Winter remained on the Vikings board of directors until 1989. He served as team president from 1965 to 1987. In 1985, Winter shocked and angered his fellow Vikings owners when he attempted to sell his share of the team to Irwin L. Jacobs and Carl Pohlad. The case went to the Minnesota Supreme Court and finally was settled in Winter's favor. https://law.justia.com/cases/minnesota/supreme-court/1987/c5-86-637-2.html

== Legacy ==
When the Minnesota Vikings headquarters and training facility opened in Eden Prairie, Minnesota, the Vikings had named it Winter Park, in honor of Max Winter. Their headquarters is now in Eagan, Minnesota.
