= Jaye F. Dyer =

American business executive (1927–2009)

- Born: April 22, 1927; Moore, Oklahoma, U.S.
- Died: June 2, 2009 (aged 82); Wayzata, Minnesota, U.S.
- Education: University of Oklahoma (BS)
- Occupations: Executive Vice President of Apache Corporation; Founder and CEO of Dyco Petroleum Corporation; Former co-owner of the Minnesota Vikings
- Spouse: Betty J. Dyer
- Children: 3

Jaye Floyd Dyer (April 22, 1927–June 2, 2009) was an American energy executive and sports team owner.

Dyer was born in 1927 in Moore, Oklahoma. He served in the United States Navy from 1945 to 1946. He graduated from the University of Oklahoma in 1951 with a Bachelor's degree in Geology and entered the oil and gas industry. He rose to the position of executive vice president of Apache Corporation.

In 1971, Dyer formed Dyco Petroleum Corporation. The company went public in 1976 and was listed on the New York Stock Exchange in 1981. In 1985, Dyco was sold to Diversified Energies in a stock swap. Dyer continued to lead Dyco as a division of Diversified Energies until 1989, when he was succeeded as president by former Enron executive Daniel L. Dienstbier. Dyer stayed on as Dyco's chairman.

In 1986, Dyer purchased part of the Minnesota Vikings. He mediated disputes between the teams directors and was the team's managing partner for a time. He sold his interest in the team in 1998.

== Personal Life & Death ==
Dyer was married to Betty J. Dyer. The couple had three children: Michael (son), Jan (daughter), and Karen (daughter)

Dyer died on June 2, 2009, at his home in Wayzata, Minnesota.
