= H. P. Skoglund =

American businessman (1903–1977)

Howell Pomeroy Skoglund (July 5, 1903 – November 5, 1977) was an American businessman who was the president of the North American Life and Casualty Company and a founding owner of the Minnesota Vikings of the National Football League.

== Early life ==
Skoglund was born July 5, 1903, in Starbuck, Minnesota. He graduated from St. Olaf College in 1925 and turned down the opportunity to work for his family’s lumber business to move to Minneapolis, where he found a job as a clerk for the C.J. Hoigaard Company. In 1929 he was named secretary of the company.

== North American Life and Casualty ==
In 1933, Skoglund became the president of the North American Life and Casualty Company. The thirty-year-old Skoglund was the youngest president in the life insurance industry. One month after taking over, Skoglund fired all 160 of the company's salesman and started over with four salesmen. He then focused on selling low-cost hospital and accident insurance with the idea that this would eventually attract new life insurance customers. By 1941 the number of NALAC's active life insurance policies had increased sixfold. In 1947 the company joined Investors Diversified Services to provide term life insurance for people purchasing investment fund shares. This arrangement lasted until 1957, when IDS started its own life insurance company. The company expanded into Canada and in the 1960s began marketing to working women. By 1960, the company had $1 billion in active policies. In 1964 NALAC passed the $2 billion mark. Skoglund retired in 1974 and moved to Sun City, Arizona.

== Minnesota Vikings ==
An avid sports fan, Skoglund owned 20% of the Minnesota Vikings and was the team's longtime chairman. He also played in role in the construction of Metropolitan Stadium through NALAC's purchase of bonds.

== Other activities ==
Skoglund served as chairman of the St. Olaf College board of regents, was president of the Fairview Hospital board of trustees, and was a director of the Minneapolis and St. Louis Railway and North Central Airlines. He also owned a cattle ranch outside Cody, Wyoming, a livestock farm in Starbuck, Minnesota, was part-owner of a residential community outside Palm Springs, California, and owned the Ventura County Railroad.

== Philanthropy ==
Skoglund was a leading donor to the American Lutheran Church. He picked out the site for the ALC's Sun City church and contributed $150,000 towards its construction. He also gave $3 million in gifts to St. Olaf College, including a fieldhouse named after him.

== Personal life ==
Skoglund died of a heart attack on November 5, 1977, in Sun City. He was buried in Lakewood Cemetery in Minneapolis.
