= 1998 NFC Championship Game =

NFL conference title game decided by a last-minute missed field goal

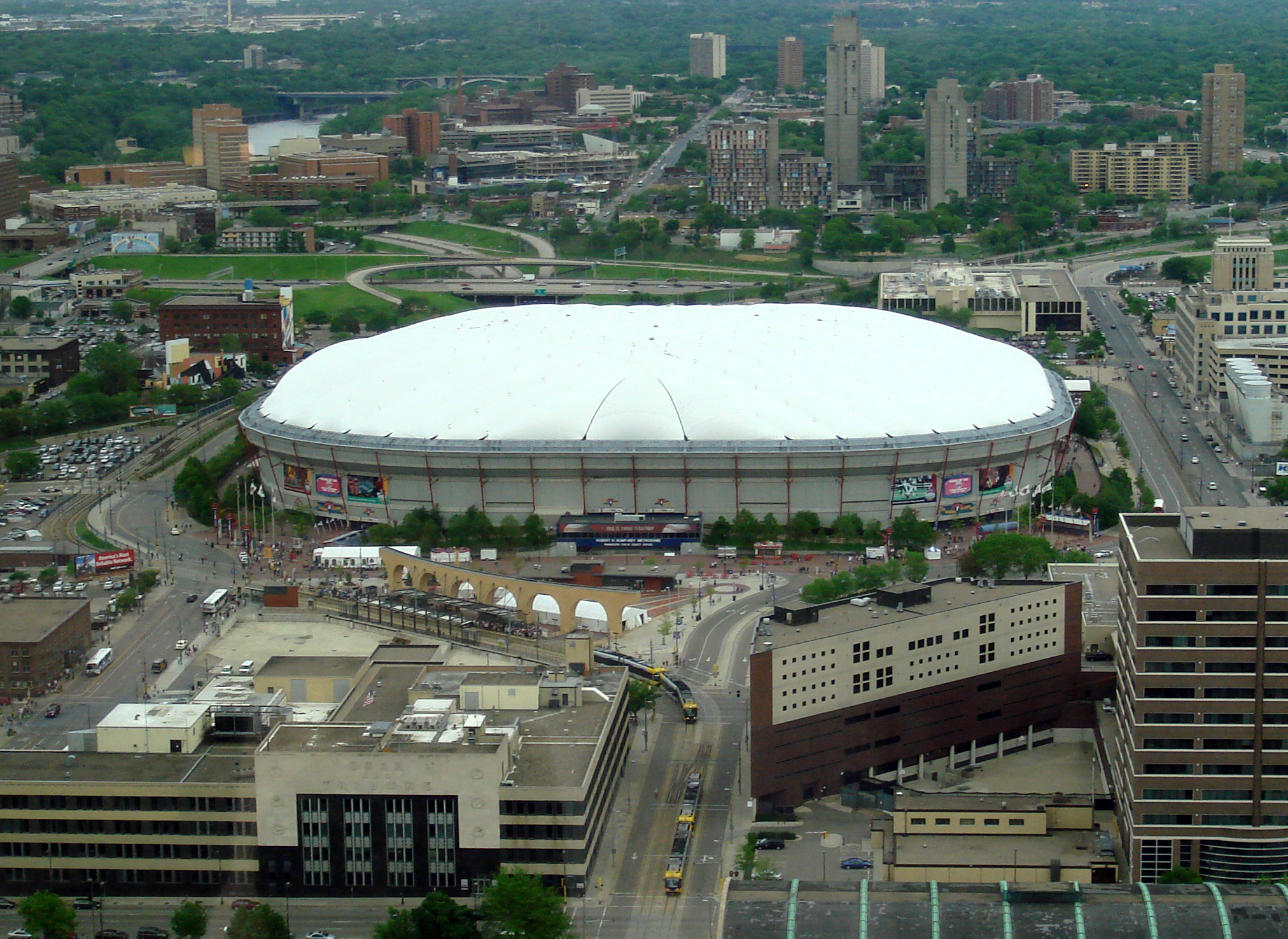
- Hubert H. Humphrey Metrodome, the site of the game
Atlanta Falcons (2) (14–2)	Minnesota Vikings (1) (15–1)
30	27
Head coach: Dan Reeves	Head coach: Dennis Green
	1	2	3	4	OT	Total
ATL	7	7	3	10	3	30
MIN	7	13	0	7	0	27
- Date: January 17, 1999
- Stadium: Hubert H. Humphrey Metrodome; Minneapolis, Minnesota
- Favorite: Vikings by 11
- Referee: Walt Coleman
- Attendance: 64,060

TV in the United States
- Network: Fox
- Announcers: Pat Summerall and John Madden

The 1998 National Football Conference (NFC) Championship Game was the 29th title game (Note: In this series of articles, title game refers to pre–merger AFL and NFL Championship Games up to and including the 1969 season as well as post–merger AFC and NFC Championship Games from the 1970 season onward.) of the NFC. This National Football League (NFL) playoff game was played on January 17, 1999, to determine the NFC champion for the 1998 NFL season. The visiting Atlanta Falcons defeated the heavily favored Minnesota Vikings 30–27 in sudden death overtime to win their first conference championship and advance to the franchise's first Super Bowl appearance. As a result of their loss, the Vikings were eliminated from the playoffs and became the first team in NFL history to have at least 15 wins in the regular season and not win the Super Bowl, a feat that was also later accomplished by the 2004 Pittsburgh Steelers, 2007 New England Patriots (who won 16 games), 2011 Green Bay Packers, 2015 Carolina Panthers, and 2024 Detroit Lions and Kansas City Chiefs.

The game is considered one of the most memorable conference championship games in NFL history. Entering the playoffs, the Vikings were the favorite to win the Super Bowl, as they had set the NFL record for most points scored by a team in a single season. They had gone undefeated in their home stadium, the Hubert H. Humphrey Metrodome, during the regular season, and their placekicker, Gary Anderson, had become the first kicker in NFL history to convert every field goal and extra point attempt in a season. At a critical moment late in the game, Anderson missed a field goal for the first time that year, which, if converted, would have given the Vikings a nearly insurmountable 10-point lead. Instead, the Falcons scored a touchdown to tie the game on their ensuing drive and subsequently won by a field goal in overtime. Due to its impact on the game's outcome, Anderson's missed field goal has since become the focal point of the loss.

The Falcons lost 34–19 to the Denver Broncos two weeks later in Super Bowl XXXIII. The Falcons would not return to the Super Bowl until the 2016 NFL season, when the Falcons lost in overtime to the New England Patriots in Super Bowl LI. Although the game long stood as the proudest moment in the history of the Falcons franchise, the 1998 NFC Championship Game has been remembered for the effect it had on the Vikings players and their fan base, as it is seen by some sportswriters as one of the most devastating losses in NFL history.

== Background ==
=== Minnesota Vikings ===
Entering the 1998 season, the Minnesota Vikings had accumulated a history of disappointing losses despite their elite level of play. Although they were the first NFL franchise to play in four Super Bowls, they also became the first to lose four Super Bowls after their final appearance in Super Bowl XI. In other seasons, they had come within seconds of winning playoff games only to lose in dramatic fashion. During a 1975 Divisional round playoff game, the Vikings lost to the Dallas Cowboys on a 50-yard touchdown pass from Roger Staubach to Drew Pearson that Vikings fans, media personalities, and former players claim should have been nullified by offensive pass interference. Twelve years later, the Vikings lost to the Washington Redskins in the 1987 NFC Championship Game after running back Darrin Nelson dropped a game-tying touchdown pass on fourth down in the game's final minute. This history of misfortune led the NFL Network to rank the Vikings as the second most "snake-bitten" franchise of all-time, behind only the Cleveland Browns for their playoff losses in the late 1980s.

Under head coach Dennis Green, the Vikings were perennial playoff contenders throughout the 1990s, but they experienced little success once they reached the postseason. In the first round of the 1998 NFL draft, the Vikings selected wide receiver Randy Moss, who, despite his talent, was passed by several teams, even those in need of a wide receiver, due to concerns surrounding Moss's misbehavior and multiple arrests during high school and college. Moss used this as motivation to make teams who passed on him regret their decision. That year, Moss set the NFL record for most touchdown receptions by a rookie with 17, and combined with future Hall of Fame wide receiver Cris Carter and quarterback Randall Cunningham, he formed the centerpiece of the Vikings' offensive attack, which also set an NFL record by scoring 556 points during the season. The Vikings' defense was led by future Hall of Fame defensive tackle John Randle and was ranked sixth overall in points allowed during the season.

The Vikings finished the regular season with a record of 15–1 and held the first overall seed in the NFC playoffs; the two previous NFL teams to finish the regular season with 15 wins, the 1984 San Francisco 49ers and the 1985 Chicago Bears, had each won the Super Bowl. Former player turned analyst Brian Baldinger claimed that "They were easily the best team in football," and Pro Football Hall of Fame writer Ray Didinger observed, "It seems like this is the unstoppable team." Dan Barreiro, a sports radio host in the Minneapolis area, noted that for the Vikings franchise, "'98 was the season. All the stars had aligned."

Vikings placekicker Gary Anderson had joined the team that off-season after playing for three different teams in his 16-year NFL career. In 1998, he became the first placekicker in NFL history to convert every field goal and extra point attempted, scoring a regular season record of 164 points in the process. He finished the regular season 35/35 on field goals, with a long of 53 yards, and 59/59 on extra points. As a result, he was voted to the 1998 NFC Pro Bowl team, the fourth Pro Bowl invitation of his career, and was voted to the AP All-Pro team for the first time. He also converted every field goal and extra point attempt in a Divisional playoff round victory against the Arizona Cardinals the week before the NFC Championship. Entering the NFC Championship Game, his last miss was on December 15, 1997, against the Denver Broncos, when he was a member of the San Francisco 49ers.

=== Atlanta Falcons ===
The Atlanta Falcons had a "frustrating" team history, as described by Atlanta sports journalist Terence Moore. Moore singled out the 1980 divisional playoff game against the Dallas Cowboys, in which the Falcons gave up a 14-point lead en route to a defeat, as well as a 6-turnover performance during their 1991 divisional playoff defeat against the Washington Redskins as notable examples of frustration. Prior to the 1998 season, the Falcons had never advanced to the NFC Championship game, let alone to a Super Bowl.

The 1998 season was not expected to be any different, as the Falcons had failed to reach the playoffs the previous two seasons and only made the playoffs twice in the previous fifteen seasons. However, head coach Dan Reeves, who was hired before the previous season, had overhauled the roster in an attempt to reverse the team's fortunes. Thirty-eight of the fifty-three players on the 1998 Falcons team had been brought in by Reeves over the previous year, including journeyman quarterback Chris Chandler, who had a career-best season in 1998. Running back Jamal Anderson also posted a career-high 1,846 rushing yards, which led the NFC that year, and the defense finished fourth overall in points allowed. As a result, the Falcons won the NFC West with a record of 14–2 and clinched the second overall seed in the NFC playoffs, behind only the Vikings. The team was nicknamed the "Dirty Birds" after a touchdown dance created by tight end O.J. Santiago but popularized by Anderson.

After experiencing chest pains following the team's 27–17 victory over the New Orleans Saints on December 13, Reeves underwent quadruple bypass surgery. The team was coached by defensive coordinator Rich Brooks for the final two regular season games. Reeves was able to return to the team in time for their first playoff game, in which the Falcons beat their division rival, the San Francisco 49ers, to clinch a spot in the Conference Championship. Despite an impressive season, they were not expected to match up well against the Vikings, who had beaten teams by an average of 23.22 points at home that year and were installed as 11-point favorites for the Championship Game.

== Game summary ==
We're playing at home, and if we win, we're going to the Bowl. I thought at that moment that everything that I had done, that my payoff would be the Super Bowl.

— Vikings wide receiver Cris Carter

The Falcons won the coin toss before the game and elected to receive the opening kickoff. They drove down the field and scored first on a five-yard touchdown pass to Jamal Anderson. On the next drive, the Vikings answered the score with a 31-yard touchdown pass from Cunningham to Randy Moss, tying the game at 7. Neither team scored in the remainder of the first quarter. In the second quarter, Gary Anderson kicked a field goal after the Vikings recovered a Falcons fumble to make the score 10–7. After forcing the Falcons to punt on the next drive, the Vikings scored another touchdown on a one-yard run by Cunningham, increasing the lead to 17–7 with five minutes remaining in the first half. The Falcons then lost another fumble, which gave possession back to the Vikings. On the ensuing drive, Moss dropped what would have been a touchdown pass in the end zone, leaving Gary Anderson to kick another field goal to make the score 20–7. After forcing another Falcons punt, the Vikings attempted to increase their lead before halftime, but Falcons lineman Chuck Smith forced a fumble on Cunningham, and the Falcons recovered the ball deep in Vikings territory. The Falcons subsequently scored on a 14-yard touchdown pass from Chris Chandler to Terance Mathis to cut their deficit to 20–14 by the end of the half.

The Falcons forced the Vikings to punt on the opening drive of the second half, and two long plays by wide receiver Tim Dwight set up a 27-yard field goal by Morten Andersen, which cut the Falcons' deficit to three points. The Vikings answered the score on their ensuing possession, driving 82 yards in 15 plays to score a touchdown on a five-yard Matthew Hatchette reception, which made the score 27–17 with just over 13 minutes left in the fourth quarter. The Falcons responded with a 70-yard completion to Tony Martin, which set up a 24-yard field goal by Morten Andersen to make the score 27–20. On the ensuing Vikings drive, Cunningham fumbled a snap and the Falcons recovered the ball on the Vikings' 30-yard line; the Falcons failed to score after an incomplete pass turned the ball over on downs with six minutes left in the game. The Vikings then drove down to the Falcons' 22-yard line, where an incomplete pass on 3rd down set up a field goal attempt by Gary Anderson.

=== Anderson's kick ===
Here's the snap, the kick is up, and it is ... no good! No good! Gary Anderson has missed a field goal for the first time in two years!

— Falcons radio broadcast of the NFC Championship Game

The incompletion on 3rd down stopped the clock with 2:11 left in the game. The field goal attempt was placed from 39 yards away, which is not considered a particularly difficult field goal distance by NFL standards. Because the game was played indoors at the Metrodome, there were no adverse weather conditions that might have affected the kick. The ball was snapped on 4th down with punter Mitch Berger holding from the left hash mark. The Vikings faced a heavy rush from cornerback Michael Booker on the left side of the line of scrimmage and cornerbacks Ronnie Bradford and Ray Buchanan on the right, who ran into Anderson and knocked him to the ground after the kick. The ball sailed about a foot wide left of the upright with 2:07 left on the game clock. Afterward, Anderson stood on the field momentarily with arms akimbo before heading to the sideline, as Falcons players celebrated around him.

A converted field goal would have given the Vikings a 10-point lead, which would have almost certainly clinched victory, according to Pro Football Prospectus and the NFL Network documentary The Missing Rings. Citing a mathematical algorithm by sports analytics company numberFire, The New York Post reported that the Vikings had a 95.23% chance of winning the game had Anderson converted the field goal.

=== End of regulation and overtime ===
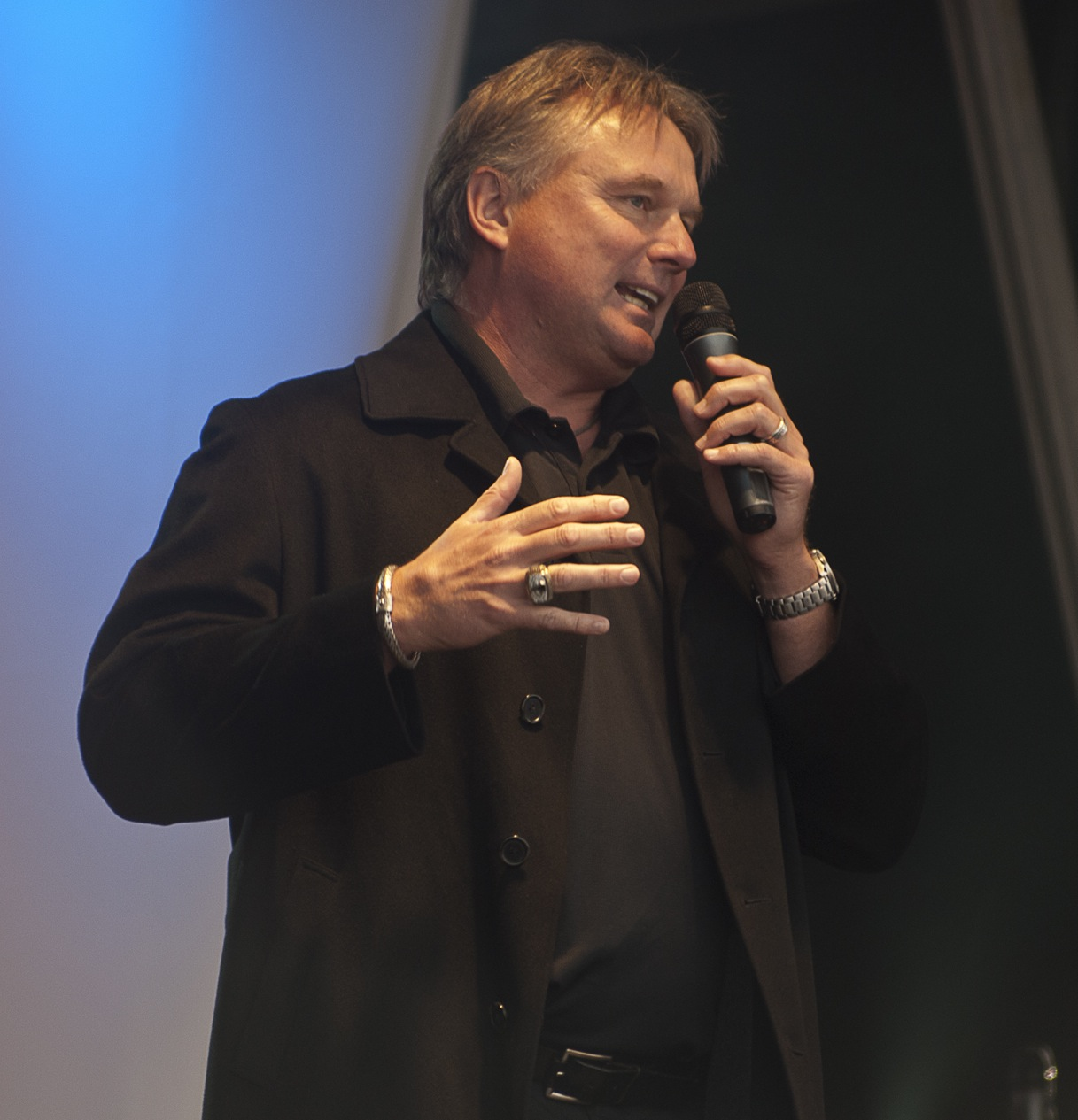
Atlanta Falcons placekicker Morten Andersen, pictured here in 2010, kicked the game winning field goal in overtime to lift the Falcons over the Vikings in the 1998 NFC Championship game.

The Falcons took possession of the football at their own 29-yard line and quickly drove down the field. With just over a minute left in the game, Vikings safety Robert Griffith dropped an interception off a deflected pass, which would have also almost certainly clinched victory. Instead, Chandler threw a touchdown pass to Mathis on the next play, tying the game 27–27 with 49 seconds remaining in regulation. On the ensuing possession, the Vikings managed only seven yards and then kneeled on third down, which ran out the clock and forced overtime. Under the NFL overtime rules then in force, the first team to score in the overtime period would win.

The Vikings won the coin toss and started overtime with possession of the football on their own 29-yard line, but managed to convert only one first down and punted to Atlanta. The Falcons drove to their own 41-yard line before being stopped on 3rd down, and they punted the ball back to Vikings. On the ensuing drive, Cunningham attempted a deep pass to Moss that was narrowly broken up by Eugene Robinson; had the pass been completed, it most likely would have resulted in a touchdown and victory for the Vikings. Instead, the Vikings had to punt on 4th down again. The Falcons then drove to the Vikings' 21-yard line, where Morten Andersen converted a 38-yard field goal for the win.

== Aftermath ==
=== Player reactions ===
After the game, Gary Anderson was described as "inconsolable". Although the Vikings still led by seven points at the time, his missed kick had a demoralizing effect on the team. ESPN contributor Ben Goessling noted "how swiftly it pulled the bottom out from under a team that had an air of inevitability about it to that point." Writing for the website Sporting News, Jeff Diamond, the Vikings' general manager at the time, observed that, "Our team played the rest of the game as if it was in shock that our automatic kicker had missed at the most critical time." Randle concurred, describing his reaction to the kick as, "I was standing there like someone just punched me in my stomach, and was like, 'Oh my God, oh my God.'" Brian Billick, the offensive coordinator of the 1998 Vikings, went as far as stating, "I'm not sure the city had ever rebounded from it." Cunningham concurred by claiming, "With that kick, it just seemed like the whole franchise went wide left."

Carter openly wept in the locker room after the game and was affected so badly by the loss that he considered retirement. "Walking off that field and losing like that," Carter reflected, "I didn't even know if I wanted to play football anymore. Because I just, I felt like that I would never win after that." He went on to call the game, "The most devastating loss that I've ever been a part of." Both Carter and fellow Hall of Fame member Randle believed that the 1998 Vikings team was their best chance at winning a Super Bowl; neither player ever won the Super Bowl in their careers.

Randle described the feeling after the game as, "It's like driving down a street and getting every green light for the next ten miles, and you're just cruising along, and it's just smooth. And all of a sudden, you're getting there, you're almost there, and all of a sudden, the fucking light turns red, and you get sideswiped." Randle further laments the loss due to the background of many of his teammates, whom he described as "misfits, guys who just got their second chance." Beyond Moss's legal troubles, Carter had been released by the Philadelphia Eagles early in his career for substance abuse issues, and Cunningham was released by the Eagles and remained unsigned to a team two seasons prior. Randle himself was considered undersized coming out of college and was not heavily pursued by NFL teams.

Cunningham drew on his religious faith to persevere through the loss, believing that God had a reason for everything to happen. Years later, he reflected, "It just wasn't our destiny to be in the Super Bowl. That's my conclusion. Because if it was, we would have gone." Immediately after the game, he expressed this belief in an attempt to console Carter. The following season, Cunningham was benched for poor play after six games and was released by the Vikings at the end of the year. He also would never play in a Super Bowl.

Overjoyed with victory, Falcons players also wept after the game, and the team ripped open pillows and threw feathers in celebration on their charter flight back to Atlanta. Buchanan stated that the win "feels like a miracle" due to the negative perception of the Falcons in years past. "This team was dirt. People stepped on us and wiped their feet on the doormat. Now we feel like a bunch of Michael Jordans." Chandler joked that due to his game-winning field goal, Morten Andersen "gets to keep his green card", referring to Andersen's Danish nationality, while running back Jamal Anderson felt vindicated for the media's continuous focus on the Vikings in the days leading up to the game, which made him feel disrespected.

Falcons defensive end Chuck Smith questioned the Vikings' toughness because of the ease with which they had won during the season. "It's one thing to beat up on people," said Smith, "but how do you react when someone's finally hitting you back? We've been slugging it out all year." Years later, Smith went on to criticize Gary Anderson in particular for his missed field goal and its contribution to the Vikings' loss.

=== Media analysis ===
By virtue of their loss, the 1998 Vikings became the first team in NFL history to compile a regular season record of 15–1 and not win the Super Bowl. Fox Sports, NBC Sports, and the NFL Network each named the team as one of the five greatest not to win the Super Bowl, and coach Dennis Green believed that the 1998 Vikings would have been considered the best NFL team of their generation had they gone on to win. As part of a series celebrating the 100th anniversary of the league, the NFL ranked the 1998 Vikings as the 38th greatest team in league history, the third highest ranking for a team that didn't win a championship and the highest for a team that failed to play in either the Super Bowl or the NFL Championship Game. In a 2018 retrospective, Sports Illustrated called the 1998 Vikings "The Greatest Team Never to Make It".

The loss had a dramatic effect on Minnesota sports culture, as the 1998 Vikings were considered the team most likely to deliver a championship to a franchise that had already suffered multiple heartbreaking defeats. Both Damon Amendolara of CBS Radio and Don Banks of Sports Illustrated consider the Vikings' loss as one of the most devastating in NFL history and criticized the television program NFL Top 10 for not including it on a list of such losses. Banks further noted that "The Vikings have never completely recovered from that game," a sentiment shared by Bill Simmons and NFL Films. This perception has extended into popular culture, as the game became a plot point in the episode "Little Minnesota" of the television show How I Met Your Mother when Robin, a Canadian character, asks the significance of a banner in a Minnesota-themed bar that reads, "I'm drinking till I forget the 1999 [sic] NFC Championship."

Gary Anderson's missed kick has been singled out as the main contributing factor to the Vikings' loss, as the Falcons were able to capitalize on the late shift in momentum produced by an unexpected opportunity to tie and eventually win the game. Considering this impact on the game's outcome and the historic performances of Anderson and the 1998 Vikings team, the miss has since been noted as a memorable moment in the greater history of the NFL. Paul Allen, the play-by-play radio announcer for the Vikings, and Dan Barreiro both consider the miss as one of the most devastating moments in the history of Minnesota sports. According to Chad Hartman, another sports radio host based in Minneapolis, "[Anderson] will always be known as the guy who was a part of screwing up the Vikings' trip to the Super Bowl, even though he had this magnificent season." ESPN voted the miss as the most memorable play in Vikings history, and ESPN contributor Ben Goessling believes that the miss influenced misfortunes that the franchise faced in subsequent years, including two additional conference championship losses following the 2000 and 2009 seasons.

Anderson has claimed that in greater context, the miss was not particularly notable, and it is only remembered because the Falcons won the game. Buchanan, who was attempting to block Anderson's kick, believes that Anderson would not have been able to convert the field goal regardless, since if the kick was on target, it would have "hit [Buchanan] in the face mask." Vikings backup quarterback Brad Johnson echoed this sentiment, stating, "I think someone got loose on the left end and they almost blocked it, and [Anderson] tried to slice it in there." Several sportswriters, as well as Randle, have defended Anderson, pointing out that the Vikings' defense deserved the real blame for the loss for allowing Atlanta to tie the game after Anderson's miss. Barreiro also criticized the performance of Vikings starting quarterback Cunningham, who he felt did not handle the pressure of the game well and called "dreadful down the stretch".

Vikings head coach Dennis Green was criticized for his decision to kneel on 3rd down and play for overtime instead of attempting to score before the end of regulation. Radio host Bob Sansevere, author of The Best Minnesota Sports Arguments, called it "one of the all-time boneheaded decisions a coach has ever made in any sport". Of Green's play call, Peter King of Sports Illustrated wrote, "Minnesota coach Dennis Green did a great job this year, but if he doesn't wake up and stare at the ceiling in the next few days and say out loud: 'Boy, I screwed that one up,' then he's not being honest with himself." Nonetheless, local Minneapolis newspaper Star Tribune has contended that taking a knee was the correct decision due to the performance of the Vikings' offense, whose struggles that day were also noted by Carter.

Falcons head coach Dan Reeves was praised for his ability to lead the team after having heart surgery only weeks prior, as Reeves' comeback proved to be an emotional rallying point for the team. Austin Murphy of Sports Illustrated noted that Reeves' return "[galvanized] the already close-knit Falcons", and Falcons linebacker Jessie Tuggle agreed: "Dan has really inspired us all. ... He walked in the meeting room four days after having had surgery, and you could have heard a pin drop. We wanted to hear every last word he had to say." Reeves described his time during the season as "more rewarding than any other teams I've been involved in", and to Falcons special teams coach Joe DeCamillis, Reeves' leadership that season was "his best coaching job ever". CBS called Reeves' return "an amazing comeback that people will be talking about for years".

Chandler was considered to be the offensive hero of the game, despite the attention that the Vikings' offense received during the season. Media analysis before the game noted that the Vikings' defense needed to focus on shutting down Falcons running back Jamal Anderson; feeling overlooked, Chandler used the coverage as extra motivation. In a retrospective for the website SportsGrid, Geoff Magliocchetti detailed the end of the game, in which he claims that Chandler "embarked on the drive of his life, an 8-play, 71-yard masterpiece, finding Mathis from 16 yards out for the tying score."

The Falcons missed the playoffs the following season (while their home stadium hosted the Super Bowl) and would not return to the postseason until 2002. Following the 2001 season, Chandler was released by the team, and Jamal Anderson retired due to a knee injury. As a result, their win in the 1998 NFC Championship game stood as the franchise's proudest moment for years, (Note: Following two additional losses in the NFC Championship Game during the 2004 and 2012 seasons, the Falcons returned to the Super Bowl in 2017, where they lost to the New England Patriots 34 – 28 after leading 3 – 28 in the third quarter.) particularly due to the atmosphere of pessimism that surrounded the franchise at the time. An NFL Films retrospective on the Falcons' season noted that "years of pain were wiped away in one unforgettable afternoon," and Dan Weiner stated that, "The 1998 season was a dream come true ... For once, the Atlanta Falcons made believers of us all." In 2010, ESPN named the 1998 team as the greatest Falcons team of all-time, and the network also voted Morton Andersen's game-winning field goal as the top play in Falcons' history.

=== Super Bowl XXXIII ===
In the hours before the AFC Championship Game, the Denver Broncos were watching the NFC Championship Game on the JumboTron at Mile High Stadium to see who they would play in Super Bowl XXXIII should they defeat the New York Jets. Broncos head coach Mike Shanahan expressed surprise at Anderson's missed kick, and running back Terrell Davis said that the Falcons' subsequent victory put the Broncos in the mindset that they had "won the Super Bowl already," as their greatest potential challenge had been eliminated. This distraction nearly cost the Broncos, as they played a poor game. Tim Connolly, the Vikings team president at the time, recalled that Shanahan insinuated relief that the Broncos were not playing the Vikings when the two met at a reception after the conference championship games.

Two weeks later in the Super Bowl, the Falcons played the Broncos, the game pitting coach Dan Reeves against his former team and their star quarterback, John Elway. Reeves had led the Broncos to three Super Bowl appearances, all losses, and he was fired as the Broncos' head coach after the 1992 NFL season. Afterward, Elway was quoted as saying, "These last three years have been hell. I know I would not have been back here if Dan Reeves had been here. It wasn't worth it to me. I didn't enjoy it. It wasn't any fun, and I got tired of working with him." Reeves responded by saying, "Just tell him it wasn't exactly heaven for me either. One of these days I hope he grows up. Maybe he'll mature sometime." During his tenure, Reeves had also fired Shanahan, who was an assistant coach on the team, and these points of contention became a media storyline entering the game. Nonetheless, all parties involved stated that any lingering animosity had long since passed.

The Falcons lost Super Bowl XXXIII by a score of 34–19, which earned the Broncos their second consecutive Super Bowl victory. The game was anticipated as a match up between the Vikings and the Broncos, and the Falcons' presence in the game was noted as an anticlimax. The night before the game, safety Eugene Robinson was arrested for soliciting a prostitute. Although Robinson played in the game, the distraction contributed to a poor performance by the Falcons team, who managed only six points in six drives deep into Denver territory and surrendered a season-high point total.

== Statistics ==
=== Box score ===
Quarter	1	2	3	4	OT	Total
Falcons	7	7	3	10	3	30
Vikings	7	13	0	7	0	27

at Hubert H. Humphrey Metrodome, Minneapolis Minnesota

- Date: January 17, 1999
- Game time: 12:30 pm CT
- Gamebook

Scoring summary

Quarter	Time	Drive			Team	Scoring information	Score	
Quarter	Time	Plays	Yards	TOP	Team	Scoring information	ATL	MIN
1	8:21	12	76	6:39	ATL	J. Anderson 5-yard touchdown reception from Chandler, Andersen kick good	7	0
1	5:33	4	80	2:48	MIN	Moss 31-yard touchdown reception from Cunningham, G. Anderson kick good	7	7
2	9:52	12	48	6:16	MIN	29-yard field goal by G. Anderson	7	10
2	5:53	6	33	3:41	MIN	Cunningham 1-yard touchdown run, G. Anderson kick good	7	17
2	2:45	6	39	1:28	MIN	35-yard field goal by G. Anderson	7	20
2	0:56	1	14	0:03	ATL	Mathis 14-yard touchdown reception from Chandler, Andersen kick good	14	20
3	5:36	10	62	6:03	ATL	27-yard field goal by Andersen	17	20
4	13:41	15	82	6:55	MIN	Hatchette 6-yard touchdown reception from Cunningham, G. Anderson kick good	17	27
4	11:02	7	73	2:39	ATL	24-yard field goal by Andersen	20	27
4	0:49	8	71	1:18	ATL	Mathis 16-yard touchdown reception from Chandler, Andersen kick good	27	27
OT	3:08	10	70	5:20	ATL	38-yard field goal by Andersen	30	27
"TOP" = time of possession. For other American football terms, see Glossary of American football.							30	27

=== Statistical comparison ===
Per Pro Football Reference:

Statistic	Atlanta Falcons	Minnesota Vikings
First downs	25	26
Total net yards	427	356
Rushing attempts	29	34
Net yards rushing	110	102
Rushing touchdowns	0	1
Yards per rush	3.79	3
Passing – completions/attempts	27/43	29/48
Net yards passing	317	254
Passing touchdowns	3	2
Yards per attempt	7.91	5.54
Sacked-yards	3–23	3–12
Turnovers	2	2
Interceptions thrown	0	0
Fumbles-lost	2–2	3–2
Punts-Average yardage	4–44.8	4–50.8
Punt returns-yards	2–35	0–0
Kickoff returns-yards	4–110	3–75
Penalties-total yards	4–65	6–30
Time of possession	35:04	36:48

=== Individual leaders ===
Per Pro Football Reference:

Falcons Passing
	C/ATT^{1}	Yds	TD	INT	Rating
Chris Chandler	27/43	340	3	0	110.6
Falcons Rushing
	Car^{2}	Yds	TD	LG^{3}	Yds/Car
Jamal Anderson	23	67	0	11	2.91
Tim Dwight	3	28	0	21	9.33
Chris Chandler	2	15	0	9	7.5
Ken Oxendine	1	0	0	0	0
Falcons Receiving
	Rec^{4}	Yds	TD	LG^{3}	Target^{5}
Tony Martin	5	129	0	70	8
Terance Mathis	6	73	2	19	14
O. J. Santiago	3	54	0	26	4
Jamal Anderson	6	33	1	11	8
Ronnie Harris	1	29	0	29	2
Brian Kozlowski	3	11	0	5	3
Harold Green	2	9	0	8	2
Ed Smith	1	2	0	2	1
Tim Dwight	0	0	0	0	1

Vikings Passing
	C/ATT^{1}	Yds	TD	INT	Rating
Randall Cunningham	29/48	266	2	0	89.4
Vikings Rushing
	Car^{2}	Yds	TD	LG^{3}	Yds/Car
Robert Smith	21	71	0	16	3.38
Randall Cunningham	6	13	1	7	2.17
Leroy Hoard	6	10	0	5	1.67
Charles Evans	1	8	0	8	8
Vikings Receiving
	Rec^{4}	Yds	TD	LG^{3}	Target^{5}
Randy Moss	6	75	1	31	13
Cris Carter	6	67	0	17	9
Matthew Hatchette	4	34	1	14	7
Andrew Glover	4	34	0	11	5
Leroy Hoard	3	23	0	11	4
Greg DeLong	2	17	0	11	4
David Palmer	2	9	0	9	2
Charles Evans	1	9	0	9	1
Robert Smith	1	–1	0	–1	3

^{1}Completions/attempts ^{2}Carries ^{3}Long gain ^{4}Receptions ^{5}Times targeted

== Personnel ==
=== Starting lineups ===
As credited during the Fox Sports broadcast of the 1998 NFC Championship game:

Atlanta	Position	Position	Minnesota
Offense
Tony Martin	WR		Randy Moss‡
Bob Whitfield	LT		Todd Steussie
Calvin Collins	LG		Randall McDaniel‡
Robbie Tobeck	C		Jeff Christy
Gene Williams	RG		David Dixon
Ephraim Salaam	RT		Korey Stringer
O.J. Santiago	TE		Andrew Glover
Terance Mathis	WR		Cris Carter‡
Chris Chandler	QB		Randall Cunningham
Jamal Anderson	RB		Robert Smith
Brian Kozlowski	FB		Charles Evans
Defense
Lester Archambeau	LE		Derrick Alexander
Travis Hall	LT		Jerry Ball
Shane Dronett	RT		Tony Williams
Chuck Smith	RE		John Randle‡
Cornelius Bennett	WLB		Dwayne Rudd
Jessie Tuggle	MLB		Ed McDaniel
Henri Crockett	SLB		Dixon Edwards
Ray Buchanan	LCB		Corey Fuller
Michael Booker	RCB		Jimmy Hitchcock
William White	SS		Robert Griffith
Eugene Robinson	FS		Orlando Thomas
Special teams
Morten Andersen‡	K		Gary Anderson
Dan Stryzinski	P		Mitch Berger

Hall of Fame‡

=== Officials ===
As credited during the Fox Sports broadcast of the 1998 NFC Championship game:

- Referee: Walt Coleman (#65)
- Umpire: Ron Botchan (#110)
- Head linesman: Mark Baltz (#26)
- Line judge: Byron Boston (#18)
- Field judge: Bill Lovett (#98)
- Side judge: Neely Dunn (#89)
- Back judge: Billy Smith (#2)

== See also ==
- 2015 Minnesota Vikings season (a missed field goal by Blair Walsh in the NFC Wild Card)
- Double Doink
- Wide Right (Buffalo Bills)
