= 1998 Minnesota Vikings season =

NFL team season

- Owner: Red McCombs
- General manager: Jeff Diamond
- Head coach: Dennis Green
- Home stadium: Hubert H. Humphrey Metrodome

Results
- Record: 15–1
- Division place: 1st NFC Central
- Playoffs: Won Divisional Playoffs (vs. Cardinals) 41–21; Lost NFC Championship (vs. Falcons) 27–30 (OT)
- All-Pros: 9: K Gary Anderson (1st team); QB Randall Cunningham (1st team); G Randall McDaniel (1st team); WR Randy Moss (1st team); DT John Randle (1st team); S Robert Griffith (2nd team); OLB Dwayne Rudd (2nd team); T Todd Steussie (2nd team); C Jeff Christy (2nd team)
- Pro Bowlers: 10: K Gary Anderson; WR Cris Carter; C Jeff Christy; QB Randall Cunningham; LB Ed McDaniel; G Randall McDaniel; WR Randy Moss; DT John Randle; RB Robert Smith; T Todd Steussie

Uniform
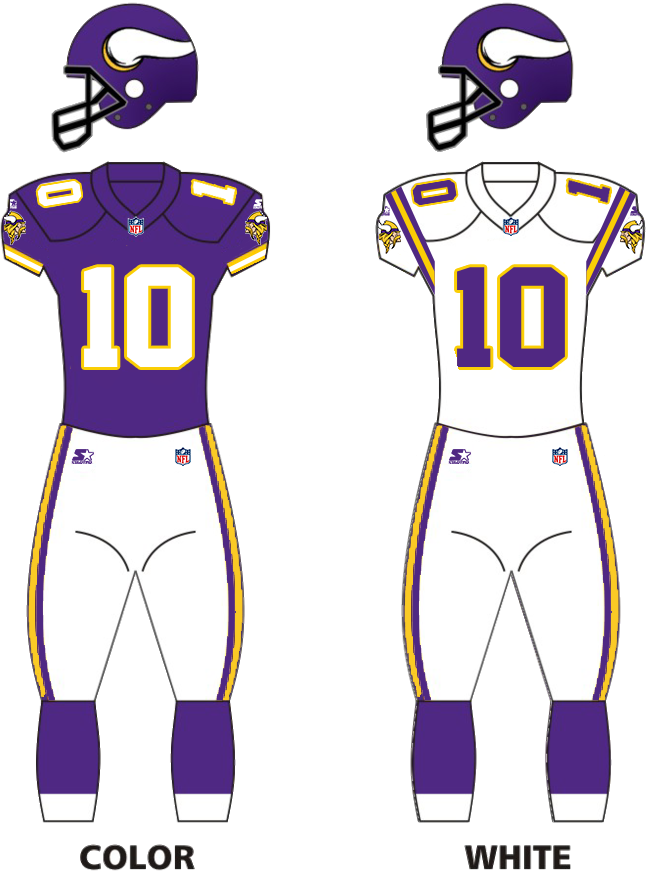

The 1998 season was the Minnesota Vikings' 38th in the National Football League (NFL), and their seventh under head coach Dennis Green. The Vikings became the third team in NFL history to win 15 games during the regular season, which earned them the National Football Conference (NFC) Central division championship and the first overall seed in the NFC playoffs. The team entered the playoffs as the favorite to win Super Bowl XXXIII, but their season ended when they were upset by the Atlanta Falcons 30–27 in the 1998 NFC Championship Game.

The 1998 Vikings team is known for its offense, which featured veteran quarterback Randall Cunningham, running back Robert Smith, and Hall of Fame wide receivers Cris Carter and rookie Randy Moss. The team scored an NFL record 556 points during the season, and Moss set an NFL record by catching 17 touchdown passes, the most ever by a rookie. On special teams, Gary Anderson became the first placekicker in NFL history to convert every field goal and extra point he attempted. The Vikings defense ranked sixth in the league in points allowed and was led by Hall of Fame defensive tackle John Randle.

In the NFC Championship Game, which was the first for the franchise in 11 years, Gary Anderson missed a field goal for the first time that season. Had the field goal been converted, it would have given the Vikings a nearly insurmountable 10-point lead late in the game. Instead, the Falcons tied the game on their ensuing drive and won by a field goal in sudden death overtime.

The 1998 Vikings were the first NFL team to compile a regular season record of 15–1 and not reach the Super Bowl. Their loss in the NFC Championship Game is also considered by their fans to be one of the most devastating losses in NFL history.

The 1998 Vikings are widely regarded as the greatest team in NFL history to not make the Super Bowl.

Despite the team's dominance during the regular season, the Vikings only faced three teams that finished with a winning record: the Packers, the Jaguars (each of whom finished 11–5) and the Cowboys (who finished 10–6).

== Offseason ==
Additions	Subtractions
K Gary Anderson (49ers)	CB Dewayne Washington (Steelers)
	LB Ron George (Chiefs)
	LB Jeff Brady (Panthers)

=== 1998 draft ===
Pro Bowler
Pro Football Hall of Fame

1998 Minnesota Vikings Draft
Draft order		Player name	Position	College	Notes
Round	Selection	Player name	Position	College	Notes
1	21	Randy Moss	Wide receiver	Marshall	
2	51	Kailee Wong	Linebacker	Stanford	
3	80	Ramos McDonald	Cornerback	New Mexico	
4	110	Kivuusama Mays	Linebacker	North Carolina	
5	144	Kerry Cooks	Safety	Iowa	
6	173	Matt Birk	Offensive tackle	Harvard	
7	208	Chester Burnett	Linebacker	Arizona	
7	225	Tony Darden	Cornerback	Texas Tech	Compensatory pick

=== Undrafted free agents ===
1998 undrafted free agents of note
Player	Position	College
Corey Bridges	Wide receiver	South Carolina
Ryan Collins	Tight end	St. Thomas (Minnesota)
Cory Withrow	Center	Washington State

== Staff ==
1998 Minnesota Vikings staff
Front office: Owner – Red McCombs; President – Gary Woods; Executive vice president/general manager – Tim Connolly; Head coaches: Head coach – Dennis Green; Offensive coaches: Offensive coordinator – Brian Billick; Quarterbacks – Chip Myers; Running backs – Carl Hargrave; Wide receivers – Hubbard Alexander; Tight ends – Dave Atkins; Offensive line – Mike Tice; Coaching assistant – Wade Harman	Defensive coaches: Defensive coordinator – Foge Fazio; Defensive line – Andre Patterson; Inside linebackers – Tom Olivadotti; Outside linebackers – Trent Walters; Defensive backs – Richard Solomon; Special teams coaches: Special teams – Gary Zauner; Strength and conditioning: Strength and conditioning – Steve Wetzel; Assistant strength and conditioning – Jeff Friday

== Roster ==
1998 Minnesota Vikings roster
Quarterbacks (QB): 8 Todd Bouman; 7 Randall Cunningham; 11 Jay Fiedler; 14 Brad Johnson; Running backs (RB): 29 Chuck Evans FB; 44 Leroy Hoard; 33 Harold Morrow FB; 22 David Palmer; 26 Robert Smith; Wide receivers (WR): 18 Tony Bland; 80 Cris Carter; 89 Matthew Hatchette; 84 Randy Moss; 86 Jake Reed; 83 Robert Tate; 81 Chris Walsh; Tight ends (TE): 85 Greg DeLong; 82 Andrew Glover; 87 Hunter Goodwin	Offensive linemen (OL): 75 Matt Birk; 62 Jeff Christy C; 71 David Dixon G; 61 Everett Lindsay G/T; 76 Chris Liwienski G/T; 64 Randall McDaniel G; 73 Todd Steussie T; 77 Korey Stringer T; Defensive linemen (DL): 90 Derrick Alexander DE/DT; 96 Jerry Ball DT; 92 Duane Clemons DE; 99 Stalin Colinet DE; 72 Jason Fisk DT; 93 John Randle DT; 98 Ben Williams DT; 94 Tony Williams DT	Linebackers (LB): 56 Pete Bercich OLB; 59 Dixon Edwards OLB; 55 Bobby Houston OLB; 53 Kivuusama Mays MLB; 58 Ed McDaniel MLB; 57 Dwayne Rudd OLB; 52 Kailee Wong OLB; Defensive backs (DB): 30 Antonio Banks CB; 38 Anthony Bass CB/S; 31 Duane Butler SS; 27 Corey Fuller CB; 24 Robert Griffith SS; 37 Jimmy Hitchcock CB; 34 Ramos McDonald CB; 42 Orlando Thomas FS; Special teams (ST): 1 Gary Anderson K; 17 Mitch Berger P; 68 Mike Morris LS	Practice squad: 49 Obafemi Ayanbadejo FB; -- Ryan Collins TE; 69 LeShun Daniels G; 60 Chris Harrison G; Reserve: 74 Orlando Bobo G (IR); 25 Tony Darden CB (IR); 23 Torrian Gray S (IR); 79 Eric Moss G (IR); 28 Anthony Phillips CB (IR); 21 Moe Williams RB (IR); Rookies in italics 53 active, 6 reserve, 4 practice squad

== Preseason ==
Week	Date	Opponent	Result	Record	Venue	Attendance
1	August 9	at New England Patriots	W 28–0	1–0	Foxboro Stadium	54,111
2	August 15	Kansas City Chiefs	W 34–0	2–0	Hubert H. Humphrey Metrodome	60,955
3	August 22	at Carolina Panthers	W 25–22 (OT)	3–0	Ericsson Stadium	64,569
4	August 28	San Diego Chargers	W 42–28	4–0	Hubert H. Humphrey Metrodome	62,127

== Regular season ==
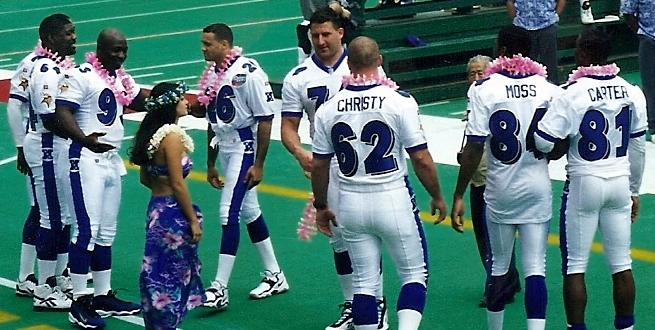
Ten Vikings (not all pictured) were named to the 1999 Pro Bowl.

Prior to the start of the 1998 season, the Vikings were sold to Red McCombs. The NFL had not been happy with the Vikings' ownership arrangement of 10 owners with none owning more than 30 per cent. The ownership decided to sell the club. At first it appeared that Tom Clancy would become the new owner. However, his attempt to buy the team fell through. So in July 1998, the team was sold to McCombs, who was from San Antonio, Texas.

1998 was a year to remember for the Minnesota Vikings. With a spectacular offense led by quarterback Randall Cunningham, who had the best year of his NFL career, running back Robert Smith, veteran wide receiver Cris Carter, and explosive rookie Randy Moss, the Vikings set a then-NFL record by scoring a total of 556 points, never scoring fewer than 24 in a game. The Vikings finished the season 15–1, their only loss by three points to the Tampa Bay Buccaneers in week nine. 12 of their 15 wins came by a margin of at least 10 points.

According to Football Outsiders, "The Vikings led the league with 52 plays of 25+ yards. They had 22 offensive plays of 40+ yards; no other team had more than 16 plays of that length."

=== Schedule ===
Week	Date	Opponent	Result	Record	Venue	Attendance
1	September 6	**Tampa Bay Buccaneers**	**W** 31–7	1–0	Hubert H. Humphrey Metrodome	62,538
2	September 13	at St. Louis Rams	**W** 38–31	2–0	Trans World Dome	56,234
3	September 20	**Detroit Lions**	**W** 29–6	3–0	Hubert H. Humphrey Metrodome	63,107
4	September 27	at **Chicago Bears**	**W** 31–28	4–0	Soldier Field	57,783
5	October 5	at **Green Bay Packers**	**W** 37–24	5–0	Lambeau Field	59,849
6	Bye					
7	October 18	Washington Redskins	**W** 41–7	6–0	Hubert H. Humphrey Metrodome	64,004
8	October 25	at **Detroit Lions**	**W** 34–13	7–0	Pontiac Silverdome	77,885
9	November 1	at **Tampa Bay Buccaneers**	**L** 24–27	7–1	Raymond James Stadium	64,979
10	November 8	New Orleans Saints	**W** 31–24	8–1	Hubert H. Humphrey Metrodome	63,779
11	November 15	Cincinnati Bengals	**W** 24–3	9–1	Hubert H. Humphrey Metrodome	64,232
12	November 22	**Green Bay Packers**	**W** 28–14	10–1	Hubert H. Humphrey Metrodome	64,471
13	November 26	at Dallas Cowboys	**W** 46–36	11–1	Texas Stadium	64,366
14	December 6	**Chicago Bears**	**W** 48–22	12–1	Hubert H. Humphrey Metrodome	64,247
15	December 13	at Baltimore Ravens	**W** 38–28	13–1	Ravens Stadium at Camden Yards	69,074
16	December 20	Jacksonville Jaguars	**W** 50–10	14–1	Hubert H. Humphrey Metrodome	64,363
17	December 26	at Tennessee Oilers	**W** 26–16	15–1	Vanderbilt Stadium	41,121

Note: Intra-division opponents are in bold text.

=== Game summaries ===
==== Week 1: vs. Tampa Bay Buccaneers ====
Week 1: Tampa Bay Buccaneers at Minnesota Vikings – Game summary

Quarter	1	2	3	4	Total
Buccaneers	0	0	7	0	**7**
**Vikings**	14	7	0	10	**31**

at Hubert H. Humphrey Metrodome, Minneapolis, Minnesota

- Date: September 6
- Game time: 12:00 p.m. CT
- Game weather: None (indoor stadium)
- Game attendance: 62,538
- Referee: Johnny Grier (23)
- TV announcers (Fox): Sam Rosen and Jerry Glanville
- Recap, Game Book

Game information

**First quarter**

- MIN – Cris Carter 1-yard pass from Brad Johnson (Gary Anderson kick), 6:31. Vikings 7–0. **Drive: 6 plays, 56 yards, 2:34.**
- MIN – Randy Moss 48-yard pass from Brad Johnson (Gary Anderson kick), 1:44. Vikings 14–0. **Drive: 3 plays, 67 yards, 1:31.**

**Second quarter**

- MIN – Randy Moss 31-yard pass from Brad Johnson (Gary Anderson kick), 6:14. Vikings 21–0. **Drive: 9 plays, 69 yards, 4:08.**

**Third quarter**

- TB – Lorenzo Neal 3-yard pass from Trent Dilfer (Michael Husted kick), 5:14. Vikings 21–7. **Drive: 8 plays, 45 yards, 5:01.**

**Fourth quarter**

- MIN – Gary Anderson 43-yard field goal, 14:16. Vikings 24–7. **Drive: 12 plays, 55 yards, 5:58.**
- MIN – Cris Carter 18-yard pass from Brad Johnson (Gary Anderson kick), 5:24. Vikings 31–7. **Drive: 3 plays, 23 yards, 1:29.**

**Top passers**

- TB – Trent Dilfer – 17/25, 207 yards, TD
- MIN – Brad Johnson – 15/25, 189 yards, 4 TD, INT

**Top rushers**

- TB – Warrick Dunn – 12 rushes, 47 yards
- MIN – Robert Smith – 18 rushes, 90 yards

**Top receivers**

- TB – Bert Emanuel – 7 receptions, 98 yards
- MIN – Randy Moss – 4 receptions, 95 yards, 2 TD

Cris Carter and rookie Randy Moss caught two touchdowns apiece as the Vikings routed the Bucs 31–7 despite being outgained in yards 319 to 298.

==== Week 2: at St. Louis Rams ====
Week 2: Minnesota Vikings at St. Louis Rams – Game summary

Quarter	1	2	3	4	Total
**Vikings**	14	10	7	7	**38**
Rams	0	10	14	7	**31**

at Trans World Dome, St. Louis, Missouri

- Date: September 13
- Game time: 12:00 p.m. CT
- Game weather: None (indoor stadium)
- Game attendance: 56,234
- Referee: Bob McElwee (95)
- TV announcers (FOX): Ray Bentley, Ron Pitts
- Recap, Game Book

Game information

**First quarter**

- MIN – Robert Smith 24-yard run (Gary Anderson kick), 10:10. Vikings 7–0. **Drive: 8 plays, 72 yards, 4:50.**
- MIN – Andrew Glover 3-yard pass from Brad Johnson (Gary Anderson kick), 3:40. Vikings 14–0. **Drive: 2 plays, 8 yards, 0:44.**

**Second quarter**

- STL – Greg Hill 1-yard run (Jeff Wilkins kick), 14:55. Vikings 14–7. **Drive: 7 plays, 74 yards, 3:45.**
- MIN – Gary Anderson 24-yard field goal, 4:18. Vikings 17–7. **Drive: 8 plays, 37 yards, 3:49.**
- STL – Jeff Wilkins 53-yard field goal, 2:24. Vikings 17–10. **Drive: 6 plays, 25 yards, 1:54.**
- MIN – Robert Smith 74-yard run (Gary Anderson kick), 1:49. Vikings 24–10. **Drive: 2 plays, 84 yards, 0:35.**

**Third quarter**

- STL – Greg Hill 5-yard run (Jeff Wilkins kick), 5:15. Vikings 24–17. **Drive: 4 plays, 14 yards, 1:54.**
- STL – Eddie Kennison 71-yard punt return (Jeff Wilkins kick), 3:37. Tied 24–24.
- MIN – Leroy Hoard 1-yard run (Gary Anderson kick), 0:46. Vikings 31–24. **Drive: 7 plays, 60 yards, 2:51.**

**Fourth quarter**

- STL – Isaac Bruce 80-yard pass from Tony Banks (Jeff Wilkins kick), 14:50. Tied 31–31. **Drive: 2 plays, 92 yards, 0:56.**
- MIN – Cris Carter 19-yard pass from Randall Cunningham (Gary Anderson kick), 2:09. Vikings 38–31. **Drive: 6 plays, 45 yards, 1:44.**

**Top passers**

- MIN – Brad Johnson – 18/31, 208 yards, TD, 2 INT
- STL – Tony Banks – 25/45, 283 yards, TD, 4 INT

**Top rushers**

- MIN – Robert Smith – 23 rushes, 179 yards, 2 TD
- STL – Greg Hill – 21 rushes, 82 yards, 2 TD

**Top receivers**

- MIN – Randy Moss – 6 receptions, 89 yards
- STL – Isaac Bruce – 11 receptions, 192 yards, TD

Brad Johnson was intercepted twice and eventually knocked out of the game; his replacement Randall Cunningham threw a late touchdown to Cris Carter. Robert Smith rushed for 179 yards and two touchdowns as the Rams stayed within a touchdown despite four Tony Banks interceptions. A last-minute goalline stand by the Vikings sealed a 38–31 win.

==== Week 3: vs. Detroit Lions ====
Week 3: Detroit Lions at Minnesota Vikings – Game summary

Quarter	1	2	3	4	Total
Lions	3	3	0	0	**6**
**Vikings**	0	6	13	10	**29**

at Hubert H. Humphrey Metrodome, Minneapolis, Minnesota

- Date: September 20
- Game time: 12:00 p.m. CT
- Game weather: None (indoor stadium)
- Game attendance: 63,107
- Referee: Phil Luckett (59)
- TV announcers (FOX): Pat Summerall, John Madden
- Recap, Game Book

Game information

**First quarter**

- DET – Jason Hanson 37-yard field goal, 4:01. Lions 3–0. **Drive: 14 plays, 61 yards, 6:41.**

**Second quarter**

- DET – Jason Hanson 49-yard field goal, 12:51. Lions 6–0. **Drive: 9 plays, 42 yards, 4:39.**
- MIN – Gary Anderson 27-yard field goal, 6:24. Lions 6–3. **Drive: 13 plays, 75 yards, 6:27.**
- MIN – Gary Anderson 28-yard field goal, 1:51. Tied 6–6. **Drive: 8 plays, 47 yards, 2:04.**

**Third quarter**

- MIN – Randy Moss 5-yard pass from Randall Cunningham (Gary Anderson kick), 11:41. Vikings 13–6. **Drive: 3 plays, 22 yards, 0:55.**
- MIN – Gary Anderson 42-yard field goal, 3:36. Vikings 16–6. **Drive: 7 plays, 27 yards, 4:11.**
- MIN – Gary Anderson 29-yard field goal, 1:02. Vikings 19–6. **Drive: 7 plays, 16 yards, 1:49.**

**Fourth quarter**

- MIN – Leroy Hoard 11-yard run (Gary Anderson kick), 14:45. Vikings 26–6. **Drive: 1 play, 11 yards, 0:05.**
- MIN – Gary Anderson 34-yard field goal, 1:51. Vikings 29–6. **Drive: 5 plays, 23 yards, 1:00.**

**Top passers**

- DET – Charlie Batch – 20/40, 160 yards, 2 INT
- MIN – Randall Cunningham – 20/35, 220 yards, TD

**Top rushers**

- DET – Barry Sanders – 22 rushes, 69 yards
- MIN – Robert Smith – 15 rushes, 39 yards

**Top receivers**

- DET – Herman Moore – 9 receptions, 66 yards
- MIN – Andrew Glover – 3 receptions, 50 yards

Cunningham made his first start of the season and threw for 220 yards and a five-yard score to Randy Moss. The game was mostly a Gary Anderson field goal exhibition as he booted five field goals plus two PATs, the second on Leroy Hoard's 11-yard rushing touchdown in the Vikings 29–6 win.

==== Week 4: at Chicago Bears ====
Week 4: Minnesota Vikings at Chicago Bears – Game summary

Quarter	1	2	3	4	Total
**Vikings**	7	3	14	7	**31**
Bears	7	14	0	7	**28**

at Soldier Field, Chicago, Illinois

- Date: September 27
- Game time: 3:15 p.m. CT
- Game weather: Partly sunny, 74 °F (23 °C)
- Game attendance: 57,783
- Referee: Ed Hochuli (85)
- TV announcers (FOX): Tim Ryan, Ronnie Lott, Bill Maas
- Recap, Game Book

Game information

**First quarter**

- MIN – Robert Smith 67-yard pass from Randall Cunningham (Gary Anderson kick), 12:43. Vikings 7–0. **Drive: 5 plays, 81 yards, 2:17.**
- CHI – Bobby Engram 33-yard pass from Erik Kramer (Jeff Jaeger kick), 9:04. Tied 7–7. **Drive: 7 plays, 84 yards, 3:39.**

**Second quarter**

- MIN – Gary Anderson 50-yard field goal, 8:38. Vikings 10–7. **Drive: 9 plays, 23 yards, 4:48.**
- CHI – Chris Penn 23-yard pass from Erik Kramer (Jeff Jaeger kick), 6:12. Bears 14–10. **Drive: 5 plays, 80 yards, 2:26.**
- CHI – Bobby Engram 4-yard pass from Erik Kramer (Jeff Jaeger kick), 0:28. Bears 21–10. **Drive: 7 plays, 66 yards, 4:18.**

**Third quarter**

- MIN – Andrew Glover 19-yard pass from Randall Cunningham (Gary Anderson kick), 11:24. Bears 21–17. **Drive: 5 plays, 34 yards, 1:49.**
- MIN – Cris Carter 35-yard pass from Randall Cunningham (Gary Anderson kick), 1:44. Vikings 24–21. **Drive: 4 plays, 68 yards, 1:34.**

**Fourth quarter**

- MIN – Randy Moss 44-yard pass from Randall Cunningham (Gary Anderson kick), 10:06. Vikings 31–21. **Drive: 1 play, 44 yards, 0:07.**
- CHI – Ryan Wetnight 19-yard pass from Erik Kramer (Jeff Jaeger kick), 1:53. Vikings 31–28. **Drive: 6 plays, 82 yards, 0:45.**

**Top passers**

- MIN – Randall Cunningham – 16/25, 275 yards, 4 TD
- CHI – Erik Kramer – 25/39, 372 yards, 4 TD, INT

**Top rushers**

- MIN – Robert Smith – 19 rushes, 76 yards
- CHI – Edgar Bennett – 11 rushes, 47 yards

**Top receivers**

- MIN – Robert Smith – 2 receptions, 83 yards, TD
- CHI – Bobby Engram – 6 receptions, 123 yards, 2 TD

Cunningham and Erik Kramer of the Bears squared off in a spirited duel. Cunningham's four touchdowns (to Smith, Andrew Glover, Carter, and Moss) were answered by Kramer's four scores (to Bobby Engram, Chris Penn, and Ryan Wetnight). The Vikings got the better of the duel as they intercepted Kramer once and won 31–28.

==== Week 5: at Green Bay Packers ====
Week 5: Minnesota Vikings at Green Bay Packers – Game summary

Quarter	1	2	3	4	Total
**Vikings**	3	21	3	10	**37**
Packers	0	10	0	14	**24**

at Lambeau Field, Green Bay, Wisconsin

- Date: October 5
- Game time: 7:20 p.m. CT
- Game weather: Light fog, scattered showers, 58 °F (14 °C)
- Game attendance: 59,849
- Referee: Gerry Austin (34)
- TV announcers (ABC): Al Michaels, Dan Dierdorf & Boomer Esiason
- Recap, Game Book

Game information

**First quarter**

- MIN – Gary Anderson 33-yard field goal, 3:14. Vikings 3–0. **Drive: 14 plays, 65 yards, 7:00.**

**Second quarter**

- GB – Ryan Longwell 40-yard field goal, 14:53. Tied 3–3. **Drive: 10 plays, 45 yards, 3:21.**
- MIN – Jake Reed 56-yard pass from Randall Cunningham (Gary Anderson kick), 12:09. Vikings 10–3. **Drive: 5 plays, 80 yards, 2:44.**
- GB – Roell Preston 101-yard kick return (Ryan Longwell kick), 11:52. Tied 10–10. **Drive: 0 plays, 0 yards, 0:17.**
- MIN – Randy Moss 52-yard pass from Randall Cunningham (Gary Anderson kick), 9:56. Vikings 17–10. **Drive: 4 plays, 76 yards, 1:56.**
- MIN – Robert Smith 24-yard pass from Randall Cunningham (Gary Anderson kick), 4:43. Vikings 24–10. **Drive: 4 plays, 65 yards, 0:47.**

**Third quarter**

- MIN – Gary Anderson 25-yard field goal, 11:17. Vikings 27–10. **Drive: 9 plays, 48 yards, 3:43.**

**Fourth quarter**

- MIN – Gary Anderson 25-yard field goal, 13:31. Vikings 30–10. **Drive: 13 plays, 79 yards, 7:21.**
- MIN – Randy Moss 44-yard pass from Randall Cunningham (Gary Anderson kick), 10:16. Vikings 37–10. **Drive: 4 plays, 57 yards, 2:20.**
- GB – Tyrone Davis 11-yard pass from Doug Pederson (Ryan Longwell kick), 3:03. Vikings 37–17. **Drive: 6 plays, 65 yards, 1:17.**
- GB – Bill Schroeder 16-yard pass from Doug Pederson (Ryan Longwell kick), 0:49. Vikings 37–24. **Drive: 11 plays, 58 yards, 2:18.**

**Top passers**

- MIN – Randall Cunningham – 20/32, 442 yards, 4 TD
- GB – Brett Favre – 13/23, 114 yards, 3 INT

**Top rushers**

- MIN – Robert Smith – 25 rushes, 78 yards
- GB – Travis Jervey – 8 rushes, 55 yards

**Top receivers**

- MIN – Randy Moss – 5 receptions, 190 yards, 2 TD
- GB – Antonio Freeman – 3 receptions, 53 yards

Randall Cunningham and Randy Moss unleashed a passing clinic on Monday Night at Lambeau Field as Cunningham tossed for 442 yards and Moss caught five passes for 190 yards and two scores (Moss also had a 75-yard touchdown reception called back due to holding). Cris Carter added eight for 119 yards as the Vikings also intercepted Brett Favre three times; backup Doug Pederson took over and threw two scores in the fourth quarter, but they did nothing to assuage a 37–24 Vikings win.

==== Week 7: vs. Washington Redskins ====
Week 7: Washington Redskins at Minnesota Vikings – Game summary

Quarter	1	2	3	4	Total
Redskins	7	0	0	0	**7**
**Vikings**	14	7	3	17	**41**

at Hubert H. Humphrey Metrodome, Minneapolis, Minnesota

- Date: October 18
- Game time: 12:00 p.m. CT
- Game weather: None (indoor stadium)
- Game attendance: 64,004
- Referee: Dick Hantak (105)
- TV announcers (FOX): Dick Stockton & Matt Millen
- Recap, Game Book

Game information

**First quarter**

- WAS – Terry Allen 2-yard run (Cary Blanchard kick), 12:48. Redskins 7–0. **Drive: 1 play, 2 yards, 0:03.**
- MIN – Andrew Glover 11-yard pass from Randall Cunningham (Gary Anderson kick), 8:31. Tied 7–7. **Drive: 7 plays, 68 yards, 4:17.**
- MIN – Leroy Hoard 1-yard run (Gary Anderson kick), 3:40. Vikings 14–7. **Drive: 6 plays, 73 yards, 2:45.**

**Second quarter**

- MIN – Cris Carter 1-yard pass from Randall Cunningham (Gary Anderson kick), 0:14. Vikings 21–7. **Drive: 10 plays, 61 yards, 0:59.**

**Third quarter**

- MIN – Gary Anderson 49-yard field goal, 9:00. Vikings 24–7. **Drive: 7 plays, 19 yards, 2:41.**

**Fourth quarter**

- MIN – Robert Smith 19-yard run (Gary Anderson kick), 12:48. Vikings 31–7. **Drive: 4 plays, 66 yards, 2:02.**
- MIN – Gary Anderson 46-yard field goal, 3:53. Vikings 34–7. **Drive: 10 plays, 48 yards, 5:16.**
- MIN – Leroy Hoard 1-yard run (Gary Anderson kick), 1:51. Vikings 41–7. **Drive: 4 plays, 12 yards, 1:02.**

**Top passers**

- WAS – Gus Frerotte – 10/26, 117 yards, INT
- MIN – Randall Cunningham – 20/34, 259 yards, 2 TD

**Top rushers**

- WAS – Terry Allen – 13 rushes, 62 yards, TD
- MIN – Robert Smith – 24 rushes, 103 yards, TD

**Top receivers**

- WAS – Michael Westbrook – 2 receptions, 35 yards
- MIN – Cris Carter – 5 receptions, 109 yards, TD

==== Week 8: at Detroit Lions ====
Week 8: Minnesota Vikings at Detroit Lions – Game summary

Quarter	1	2	3	4	Total
**Vikings**	0	10	17	7	**34**
Lions	3	10	0	0	**13**

at Pontiac Silverdome, Pontiac, Michigan

- Date: October 25
- Game time: 12:00 p.m. CT/1:00 p.m. ET
- Game weather: None (indoor stadium)
- Game attendance: 77,885
- Referee: Tony Corrente (99)
- TV announcers (FOX): Pat Summerall & John Madden
- Recap, Game Book

Game information

**First quarter**

- DET – Jason Hanson 47-yard field goal, 2:31. Lions 3–0. **Drive: 10 plays, 49 yards, 4:07.**

**Second quarter**

- MIN – Jake Reed 11-yard pass from Randall Cunningham (Gary Anderson kick), 11:50. Vikings 7–3. **Drive: 11 plays, 77 yards, 5:41.**
- DET – Johnnie Morton 1-yard pass from Charlie Batch (Jason Hanson kick), 4:15. Lions 10–7. **Drive: 13 plays, 76 yards, 7:35.**
- MIN – Gary Anderson 35-yard field goal, 1:16. Tied 10–10. **Drive: 7 plays, 34 yards, 2:59.**
- DET – Jason Hanson 48-yard field goal, 0:00. Lions 13–10. **Drive: 9 plays, 50 yards, 1:16.**

**Third quarter**

- MIN – Gary Anderson 44-yard field goal, 7:15. Tied 13–13. **Drive: 9 plays, 32 yards, 3:15.**
- MIN – Cris Carter 10-yard pass from Randall Cunningham (Gary Anderson kick), 4:42. Vikings 20–13. **Drive: 5 plays, 59 yards, 0:43.**
- MIN – Robert Smith 57-yard run (Gary Anderson kick), 1:38. Vikings 27–13. **Drive: 4 plays, 85 yards, 1:54.**

**Fourth quarter**

- MIN – Jimmy Hitchcock 79-yard interception return (Gary Anderson kick), 4:08. Vikings 34–13.

**Top passers**

- MIN – Randall Cunningham – 17/30, 190 yards, 2 TD, 2 INT
- DET – Charlie Batch – 20/37, 231 yards, TD, INT

**Top rushers**

- MIN – Robert Smith – 19 rushes, 134 yards, TD
- DET – Barry Sanders – 24 rushes, 127 yards

**Top receivers**

- MIN – Cris Carter – 5 receptions, 73 yards, TD
- DET – Johnnie Morton – 7 receptions, 89 yards, TD

==== Week 9: at Tampa Bay Buccaneers ====
Week 9: Minnesota Vikings at Tampa Bay Buccaneers – Game summary

Quarter	1	2	3	4	Total
Vikings	7	10	7	0	**24**
**Buccaneers**	7	10	0	10	**27**

at Raymond James Stadium, Tampa, Florida

- Date: November 1
- Game time: 12:00 p.m. CT/1:00 p.m. ET
- Game weather: Partly cloudy, 83 °F (28 °C)
- Game attendance: 64,979
- Referee: Ron Blum (7)
- TV announcers (FOX): Dick Stockton & Matt Millen
- Recap, Game Book

Game information

**First quarter**

- TB – Warrick Dunn 10-yard run (Michael Husted kick), 7:45. Buccaneers 7–0. **Drive: 13 plays, 65 yards, 7:15.**
- MIN – Robert Smith 9-yard run (Gary Anderson kick), 3:01. Tied 7–7. **Drive: 8 plays, 76 yards, 4:44.**

**Second quarter**

- TB – Reidel Anthony 12-yard pass from Trent Dilfer (Michael Husted kick), 10:47. Buccaneers 14–7. **Drive: 13 plays, 80 yards, 7:14.**
- MIN – Jake Reed 44-yard pass from Randall Cunningham (Gary Anderson kick), 4:16. Tied 14–14. **Drive: 12 plays, 90 yards, 6:31.**
- TB – Michael Husted 29-yard field goal, 0:36. Buccaneers 17–14. **Drive: 9 plays, 69 yards, 3:40.**
- MIN – Gary Anderson 45-yard field goal, 0:00. Tied 17–17. **Drive: 4 plays, 53 yards, 0:36.**

**Third quarter**

- MIN – Jake Reed 1-yard pass from Randall Cunningham (Gary Anderson kick), 9:23. Vikings 24–17. **Drive: 9 plays, 75 yards, 5:37.**

**Fourth quarter**

- TB – Michael Husted 38-yard field goal, 11:47. Vikings 24–20. **Drive: 4 plays, 3 yards, 0:57.**
- TB – Mike Alstott 6-yard run (Michael Husted kick), 5:48. Buccaneers 27–24. **Drive: 7 plays, 43 yards, 3:49.**

**Top passers**

- MIN – Randall Cunningham – 21/25, 291 yards, 2 TD, INT
- TB – Trent Dilfer – 11/22, 132 yards, TD

**Top rushers**

- MIN – Robert Smith – 13 rushes, 46 yards, TD
- TB – Mike Alstott – 19 rushes, 128 yards, TD

**Top receivers**

- MIN – Jake Reed – 6 receptions, 117 yards, 2 TD
- TB – Reidel Anthony – 5 receptions, 65 yards, TD

The Vikings' quest for perfection ended as Warrick Dunn and Mike Alstott ran for 243 rushing yards and two scores. Two Cunningham touchdown throws put the Vikings up 24–17 until Alstott's score in the fourth quarter proved the key to Tampa's 27–24 upset of the Vikings. The win was the third in six tries for Bucs coach Tony Dungy over his former boss Dennis Green.

==== Week 10: vs. New Orleans Saints ====
Week 10: New Orleans Saints at Minnesota Vikings – Game summary

Quarter	1	2	3	4	Total
Saints	0	7	10	7	**24**
**Vikings**	7	10	7	7	**31**

at Hubert H. Humphrey Metrodome, Minneapolis, Minnesota

- Date: November 8
- Game time: 12:00 p.m. CT
- Game weather: None (indoor stadium)
- Game attendance: 63,779
- Referee: Walt Coleman (65)
- TV announcers (FOX): Sam Rosen & Jerry Glanville
- Recap, Game Book

Game information

**First quarter**

- MIN – Cris Carter 14-yard pass from Brad Johnson (Gary Anderson kick), 2:32. Vikings 7–0. **Drive: 9 plays, 94 yards, 4:15.**

**Second quarter**

- MIN – Gary Anderson 28-yard field goal, 1:37. Vikings 10–0. **Drive: 18 plays, 70 yards, 11:23.**
- MIN – Leroy Hoard 4-yard run (Gary Anderson kick), 1:25. Vikings 17–0. **Drive: 1 play, 4 yards, 0:03.**
- NO – Aaron Craver 100-yard kickoff return (Doug Brien kick), 1:11. Vikings 17–7. **Drive: 0 plays, 0 yards, 0:14.**

**Third quarter**

- NO – Doug Brien 20-yard field goal, 7:56. Vikings 17–10. **Drive: 9 plays, 55 yards, 5:31.**
- MIN – Robert Smith 61-yard run (Gary Anderson kick), 7:33. Vikings 24–10. **Drive: 1 play, 61 yards, 0:23.**
- NO – Aaron Craver 9-yard pass from Billy Joe Tolliver (Doug Brien kick), 3:08. Vikings 24–17. **Drive: 6 plays, 80 yards, 4:25.**

**Fourth quarter**

- NO – Sammy Knight 91-yard interception return (Doug Brien kick), 10:10. Tied 24–24.
- MIN – Leroy Hoard 1-yard run (Gary Anderson kick), 3:43. Vikings 31–24. **Drive: 11 plays, 81 yards, 6:27.**

**Top passers**

- NO – Billy Joe Tolliver – 11/16, 168 yards, TD
- MIN – Brad Johnson – 28/38, 316 yards, TD, 2 INT

**Top rushers**

- NO – Lamar Smith – 11 rushes, 21 yards
- MIN – Robert Smith – 20 rushes, 137 yards, TD

**Top receivers**

- NO – Aaron Craver – 2 receptions, 58 yards, TD
- MIN – Andrew Glover – 9 receptions, 93 yards

Cunningham threw only two passes against New Orleans and Brad Johnson came off the bench to throw for 316 yards and a touchdown despite two picks; Sammy Knight ran back one pick for a 91-yard touchdown in the fourth. Robert Smith rushed for 137 yards; he and Leroy Hoard accounted for three touchdowns in Minnesota's 31–24 win.

==== Week 11: vs. Cincinnati Bengals ====
Week 11: Cincinnati Bengals at Minnesota Vikings – Game summary

Quarter	1	2	3	4	Total
Bengals	0	3	0	0	**3**
**Vikings**	7	0	7	10	**24**

at Hubert H. Humphrey Metrodome, Minneapolis, Minnesota

- Date: November 15
- Game time: 12:00 p.m. CT
- Game weather: None (indoor stadium)
- Game attendance: 64,232
- Referee: Ed Hochuli (85)
- TV announcers (CBS): Kevin Harlan & Sam Wyche
- Recap, Game Book

Game information

**First quarter**

- MIN – Randall Cunningham 3-yard run (Gary Anderson kick), 6:31. Vikings 7–0. **Drive: 9 plays, 59 yards, 5:24.**

**Second quarter**

- CIN – Doug Pelfrey 37-yard field goal, 6:56. Vikings 7–3. **Drive: 10 plays, 72 yards, 4:58.**

**Third quarter**

- MIN – Dwayne Rudd 63-yard fumble return (Gary Anderson kick), 3:39. Vikings 14–3.

**Fourth quarter**

- MIN – Gary Anderson 32-yard field goal, 12:48. Vikings 17–3. **Drive: 7 plays, 21 yards, 3:50.**
- MIN – Randy Moss 61-yard pass from Randall Cunningham (Gary Anderson kick), 11:26. Vikings 24–3. **Drive: 1 play, 61 yards, 0:07.**

**Top passers**

- CIN – Neil O'Donnell – 10/17, 77 yards
- MIN – Randall Cunningham – 13/20, 224 yards, TD, 2 INT

**Top rushers**

- CIN – Corey Dillon – 21 rushes, 66 yards
- MIN – Robert Smith – 18 rushes, 58 yards

**Top receivers**

- CIN – Darnay Scott – 4 receptions, 31 yards
- MIN – Randy Moss – 4 receptions, 99 yards, TD

==== Week 12: vs. Green Bay Packers ====
Week 12: Green Bay Packers at Minnesota Vikings – Game summary

Quarter	1	2	3	4	Total
Packers	0	7	0	7	**14**
**Vikings**	10	10	0	8	**28**

at Hubert H. Humphrey Metrodome, Minneapolis, Minnesota

- Date: November 22
- Game time: 12:00 p.m. CT
- Game weather: None (indoor stadium)
- Game attendance: 64,471
- Referee: Phil Luckett (59)
- TV announcers (FOX): Pat Summerall & John Madden
- Recap, Game Book

Game information

**First quarter**

- MIN – Gary Anderson 35-yard field goal, 11:57. Vikings 3–0. **Drive: 4 plays, 3 yards, 1:16.**
- MIN – Jimmy Hitchcock 58-yard interception return (Gary Anderson kick), 1:23. Vikings 10–0.

**Second quarter**

- MIN – Gary Anderson 28-yard field goal, 9:37. Vikings 13–0. **Drive: 11 plays, 66 yards, 5:39.**
- GB – Tyrone Davis 12-yard pass from Brett Favre (Ryan Longwell kick), 3:38. Vikings 13–7. **Drive: 11 plays, 80 yards, 5:59.**
- MIN – Cris Carter 4-yard pass from Randall Cunningham (Gary Anderson kick), 0:24. Vikings 20–7. **Drive: 10 plays, 76 yards, 3:14.**

**Third quarter**

- No scoring plays.

**Fourth quarter**

- GB – Tyrone Davis 2-yard pass from Brett Favre (Ryan Longwell kick), 7:31. Vikings 20–14. **Drive: 10 plays, 71 yards, 6:02.**
- MIN – Randy Moss 49-yard pass from Randall Cunningham (Randall Cunningham run), 3:17. Vikings 28–14. **Drive: 6 plays, 79 yards, 4:14.**

**Top passers**

- GB – Brett Favre – 31/39, 303 yards, 2 TD, INT
- MIN – Randall Cunningham – 20/30, 264 yards, 2 TD, INT

**Top rushers**

- GB – Darick Holmes – 16 rushes, 51 yards
- MIN – Leroy Hoard – 3 rushes, 39 yards

**Top receivers**

- GB – Bill Schroeder – 7 receptions, 93 yards
- MIN – Randy Moss – 8 receptions, 153 yards, TD

==== Week 13: at Dallas Cowboys ====
Week 13: Minnesota Vikings at Dallas Cowboys – Game summary

Quarter	1	2	3	4	Total
**Vikings**	21	3	15	7	**46**
Cowboys	6	6	10	14	**36**

at Texas Stadium, Irving, Texas

- Date: November 26
- Game time: 3:15 p.m. CT
- Game weather: Clear, 72 °F (22 °C)
- Game attendance: 64,366
- Referee: Bill Carollo (63)
- TV announcers (FOX): Pat Summerall & John Madden
- Recap, Game Book

Game information

**First quarter**

- MIN – Randy Moss 51-yard pass from Randall Cunningham (Gary Anderson kick), 13:03. Vikings 7–0. **Drive: 4 plays, 80 yards, 1:57.**
- DAL – Richie Cunningham 30-yard field goal, 9:35. Vikings 7–3. **Drive: 6 plays, 67 yards, 3:28.**
- MIN – Cris Carter 54-yard pass from Randall Cunningham (Gary Anderson kick), 7:17. Vikings 14–3. **Drive: 5 plays, 77 yards, 2:18.**
- DAL – Richie Cunningham 46-yard field goal, 3:04. Vikings 14–6. **Drive: 6 plays, 42 yards, 4:13.**
- MIN – Randy Moss 56-yard pass from Randall Cunningham (Gary Anderson kick), 2:41. Vikings 21–6. **Drive: 1 plays, 56 yards, 0:23.**

**Second quarter**

- DAL – Patrick Jeffers 67-yard pass from Troy Aikman (pass failed), 2:32. Vikings 21–12. **Drive: 3 plays, 67 yards, 0:20.**
- MIN – Gary Anderson 24-yard field goal, 0:16. Vikings 24–12. **Drive: 12 plays, 61 yards, 2:16.**

**Third quarter**

- DAL – Emmitt Smith 2-yard run (Richie Cunningham kick), 8:55. Vikings 24–19. **Drive: 11 plays, 76 yards, 6:05.**
- MIN – Leroy Hoard 12-yard run (Randall Cunningham–Randy Moss pass), 6:27. Vikings 32–19. **Drive: 5 plays, 70 yards, 2:28.**
- DAL – Richie Cunningham 47-yard field goal, 1:20. Vikings 32–22. **Drive: 7 plays, 3 yards, 2:22.**
- MIN – Randy Moss 56-yard pass from Randall Cunningham (Gary Anderson kick), 0:06. Vikings 39–22. **Drive: 3 plays, 76 yards, 1:14.**

**Fourth quarter**

- DAL – Emmitt Smith 1-yard run (Richie Cunningham kick), 8:48. Vikings 39–29. **Drive: 12 plays, 80 yards, 6:18.**
- MIN – Leroy Hoard 50-yard run (Gary Anderson kick), 7:33. Vikings 46–29. **Drive: 3 plays, 73 yards, 1:15.**
- DAL – Emmitt Smith 4-yard run (Richie Cunningham kick), 1:09. Vikings 46–36. **Drive: 10 plays, 47 yards, 3:50.**

**Top passers**

- MIN – Randall Cunningham – 17/35, 359 yards, 4 TD, INT
- DAL – Troy Aikman – 34/57, 455 yards, TD

**Top rushers**

- MIN – Leroy Hoard – 5 rushes, 58 yards, 2 TD
- DAL – Emmitt Smith – 18 rushes, 44 yards, 3 TD

**Top receivers**

- MIN – Randy Moss – 3 receptions, 163 yards, 3 TD
- DAL – Michael Irvin – 10 receptions, 137 yards

Cunningham and Moss led a wild 46–36 win at Dallas as Moss caught just three passes – for 163 yards and three touchdowns. Cris Carter snagged seven passes for 135 yards and a score and Leroy Hoard ran in two more touchdowns. Troy Aikman threw for a career-high 455 yards and a score to Patrick Jeffers while Emmitt Smith ran in three scores; despite 513 total yards the Cowboys could not keep pace with the Vikings. The game was also a penalty-laden affair with a combined 23 fouls eating 230 yards.

==== Week 14: vs. Chicago Bears ====
Week 14: Chicago Bears at Minnesota Vikings – Game summary

Quarter	1	2	3	4	Total
Bears	0	0	14	8	**22**
**Vikings**	14	13	7	14	**48**

at Hubert H. Humphrey Metrodome, Minneapolis, Minnesota

- Date: December 6
- Game time: 7:20 p.m. CT
- Game weather: None (indoor stadium)
- Game attendance: 64,247
- Referee: Bob McElwee (95)
- TV announcers (ESPN): Mike Patrick, Joe Thiesmann & Paul Maguire
- Recap, Game Book

Game information

**First quarter**

- MIN – Randy Moss 5-yard pass from Randall Cunningham (Gary Anderson kick), 13:14. Vikings 7–0. **Drive: 3 plays, 76 yards, 1:46.**
- MIN – Leroy Hoard 24-yard pass from Randall Cunningham (Gary Anderson kick), 6:20. Vikings 14–0. **Drive: 9 plays, 66 yards, 4:41.**

**Second quarter**

- MIN – Gary Anderson 30-yard field goal, 12:21. Vikings 17–0. **Drive: 11 plays, 49 yards, 6:28.**
- MIN – Gary Anderson 20-yard field goal, 8:35. Vikings 20–0. **Drive: 7 plays, 37 yards, 2:35.**
- MIN – Randy Moss 3-yard pass from Randall Cunningham (Gary Anderson kick), 0:21. Vikings 27–0. **Drive: 7 plays, 89 yards, 2:46.**

**Third quarter**

- CHI – Bobby Engram 47-yard pass from Steve Stenstrom (Jeff Jaeger kick), 13:33. Vikings 27–7. **Drive: 3 plays, 80 yards, 1:27.**
- MIN – Randy Moss 34-yard pass from Randall Cunningham (Gary Anderson kick), 12:14. Vikings 34–7. **Drive: 4 plays, 78 yards, 1:19.**
- CHI – Edgar Bennett 5-yard run (Jeff Jaeger kick), 5:03. Vikings 34–14. **Drive: 9 plays, 59 yards, 4:02.**

**Fourth quarter**

- MIN – Leroy Hoard 8-yard run (Gary Anderson kick), 11:31. Vikings 41–14. **Drive: 8 plays, 66 yards, 3:55.**
- MIN – Dwayne Rudd 94-yard fumble return (Gary Anderson kick), 5:46. Vikings 48–14.
- CHI – Steve Stenstrom 4-yard run (Steve Stenstrom–Chris Penn pass), 2:38. Vikings 48–22. **Drive: 7 plays, 60 yards, 3:08.**

**Top passers**

- CHI – Steve Stenstrom – 25/42, 303 yards, TD, INT
- MIN – Randall Cunningham – 21/31, 349 yards, 4 TD, INT

**Top rushers**

- CHI – Edgar Bennett – 12 rushes, 21 yards, TD
- MIN – Leroy Hoard – 19 rushes, 69 yards, TD

**Top receivers**

- CHI – Bobby Engram – 9 receptions, 140 yards, TD
- MIN – Randy Moss – 8 receptions, 106 yards, 3 TD

Four years after Warren Moon's overtime win over the Bears on Sunday Night Football, the Vikings clinched the NFC Central title by once again hosting the Bears on Sunday Night Football. Randall Cunningham unleashed four more touchdowns, three of them to Randy Moss. Leroy Hoard added a rushing score while the Bears fumbled at the Vikings six-yard line and Dwayne Rudd scored with the turnover. The Vikings won 48–22.

==== Week 15: at Baltimore Ravens ====
Week 15: Minnesota Vikings at Baltimore Ravens – Game summary

Quarter	1	2	3	4	Total
**Vikings**	12	13	10	3	**38**
Ravens	14	0	0	14	**28**

at Ravens Stadium at Camden Yards, Baltimore, Maryland

- Date: December 13
- Game time: 3:15 p.m. CT/4:15 p.m. ET
- Game weather: Mostly cloudy, 46 °F (8 °C)
- Game attendance: 69,074
- Referee: Jerry Markbreit (9)
- TV announcers (FOX): Sam Rosen & Jerry Glanville
- Recap, Game Book

Game information

**First quarter**

- MIN – Gary Anderson 43-yard field goal, 10:06. Vikings 3–0. **Drive: 11 plays, 50 yards, 4:54.**
- BAL – Corey Harris 95-yard kickoff return (Matt Stover kick), 9:49. Ravens 7–3. **Drive: 0 plays, 0 yards, 0:17.**
- MIN – Gary Anderson 31-yard field goal, 3:55. Ravens 7–6. **Drive: 6 plays, 16 yards, 1:55.**
- BAL – Patrick Johnson 97-yard kickoff return (Matt Stover kick), 3:39. Ravens 14–6. **Drive: 0 plays, 0 yards, 0:16.**
- MIN – David Palmer 88-yard kickoff return (pass failed), 3:22. Ravens 14–12. **Drive: 0 plays, 0 yards, 0:17.**

**Second quarter**

- MIN – Gary Anderson 45-yard field goal, 12:55. Vikings 15–14. **Drive: 9 plays, 28 yards, 3:35.**
- MIN – Randy Moss 17-yard pass from Randall Cunningham (Gary Anderson kick), 11:36. Vikings 22–14. **Drive: 2 plays, 17 yards, 1:06.**
- MIN – Gary Anderson 24-yard field goal, 5:17. Vikings 25–14. **Drive: 12 plays, 43 yards, 4:06.**

**Third quarter**

- MIN – Gary Anderson 46-yard field goal, 13:50. Vikings 28–14. **Drive: 4 plays, −1 yard, 0:49.**
- MIN – Cris Carter 11-yard pass from Randall Cunningham (Gary Anderson kick), 11:09. Vikings 35–14. **Drive: 5 plays, 28 yards, 2:17.**

**Fourth quarter**

- BAL – Floyd Turner 42-yard pass from Jim Harbaugh (kick aborted), 12:05. Vikings 35–20. **Drive: 5 plays, 77 yards, 2:46.**
- MIN – Gary Anderson 20-yard field goal, 2:51. Vikings 38–20. **Drive: 17 plays, 96 yards, 9:14.**
- BAL – Priest Holmes 2-yard run (Jim Harbaugh–Floyd Turner pass), 2:06. Vikings 38–28. **Drive: 4 plays, 69 yards, 0:45.**

**Top passers**

- MIN – Randall Cunningham – 32/55, 345 yards, 2 TD, INT
- BAL – Jim Harbaugh – 16/26, 212 yards, TD, INT

**Top rushers**

- MIN – Leroy Hoard – 26 rushes, 68 yards
- BAL – Priest Holmes – 8 rushes, 39 yards, TD

**Top receivers**

- MIN – Matthew Hatchette – 6 receptions, 95 yards
- BAL – Floyd Turner – 10 receptions, 147 yards, TD

Vikings offensive coordinator Brian Billick faced his employer for the following season as the two teams combined for just 143 rushing yards. This unusual game featured three kick-off returns for TDs and four fumbles (all in their own half by the Ravens) in just the first 21 minutes of play. Overall, the Ravens coughed up five fumbles but the Vikings offense was largely held in check, with Gary Anderson booting six field goals and Randall Cunningham held to two touchdowns, one to Randy Moss. Future 49ers coach Jim Harbaugh threw a 42-yard touchdown to his former Colts teammate Floyd Turner while Corey Haris, David Palmer on kick returns and Priest Holmes on a two-yard run gave the Ravens the rest of their points scored in a 38–28 Vikings win.

==== Week 16: vs. Jacksonville Jaguars ====
Week 16: Jacksonville Jaguars at Minnesota Vikings – Game summary

Quarter	1	2	3	4	Total
Jaguars	0	3	0	7	**10**
**Vikings**	3	9	14	24	**50**

at Hubert H. Humphrey Metrodome, Minneapolis, Minnesota

- Date: December 20
- Game time: 7:20 p.m. CT
- Game weather: None (indoor stadium)
- Game attendance: 64,363
- Referee: Johnny Grier (23)
- TV announcers (ESPN): Mike Patrick, Joe Theismann & Paul Maguire
- Recap, Game Book

Game information

**First quarter**

- MIN – Gary Anderson 48-yard field goal, 8:31. Vikings 3–0. **Drive: 10 plays, 43 yards, 4:04.**

**Second quarter**

- MIN – Gary Anderson 53-yard field goal, 5:01. Vikings 6–0. **Drive: 6 plays, 14 yards, 2:44.**
- MIN – Andrew Glover 14-yard pass from Randall Cunningham (pass failed), 1:52. Vikings 12–0. **Drive: 5 plays, 48 yards, 1:49.**
- JAX – Mike Hollis 25-yard field goal, 0:00. Vikings 12–3. **Drive: 10 plays, 73 yards, 1:52.**

**Third quarter**

- MIN – Randy Moss 43-yard pass from Randall Cunningham (Gary Anderson kick), 13:57. Vikings 19–3. **Drive: 2 plays, 69 yards, 1:03.**
- MIN – Andrew Glover 14-yard pass from Randall Cunningham (Gary Anderson kick), 3:55. Vikings 26–3. **Drive: 11 plays, 82 yards, 5:13.**

**Fourth quarter**

- MIN – Cris Carter 1-yard pass from Brad Johnson (Gary Anderson kick), 12:38. Vikings 33–3. **Drive: 10 plays, 67 yards, 4:36.**
- MIN – Gary Anderson 44-yard field goal, 7:46. Vikings 36–3. **Drive: 7 plays, 18 yards, 2:50.**
- MIN – Jimmy Hitchcock 30-yard interception return (Gary Anderson kick), 7:25. Vikings 43–3.
- MIN – Chuck Evans 1-yard run (Gary Anderson kick), 6:58. Vikings 50–3. **Drive: 1 play, 1 yard, 0:05.**
- JAX – Pete Mitchell 1-yard pass from Jonathan Quinn (Mike Hollis kick), 2:56. Vikings 50–10. **Drive: 9 plays, 80 yards, 4:02.**

**Top passers**

- JAX – Jonathan Quinn – 12/27, 88 yards, TD, 2 INT
- MIN – Randall Cunningham – 16/30, 210 yards, 3 TD

**Top rushers**

- JAX – Fred Taylor – 23 rushes, 105 yards
- MIN – Robert Smith – 19 rushes, 101 yards

**Top receivers**

- JAX – Fred Taylor – 4 receptions, 25 yards
- MIN – Randy Moss – 3 receptions, 72 yards, TD

Despite giving up 108 penalty yards, the Vikings reached 50 points for only the sixth time in franchise history and the first time since 1974 in a 50–10 win over the AFC Central champion Jacksonville Jaguars. Randall Cunningham threw for 210 yards and three touchdowns, then gave way to Brad Johnson who added a touchdown of his own. Cunningham was one of three Vikings players who rushed for 161 yards and a Chuck Evans touchdown while Jimmy Hitchcock intercepted Jonathan Quinn and scored from 30 yards out.

==== Week 17: at Tennessee Oilers ====
Week 17: Minnesota Vikings at Tennessee Oilers – Game summary

Quarter	1	2	3	4	Total
**Vikings**	2	6	15	3	**26**
Oilers	3	10	3	0	**16**

at Vanderbilt Stadium, Nashville, Tennessee

- Date: December 26
- Game time: 11:30 a.m. CT
- Game weather: Sunny and clear, 35 °F (2 °C)
- Game attendance: 41,121
- Referee: Tom White (123)
- TV announcers (FOX): Dick Stockton & Matt Millen
- Recap, Game Book

Game information

**First quarter**

- MIN – Penalty on Steve McNair enforced in the end zone for a safety, 10:55. Vikings 2–0.
- TEN – Al Del Greco 36-yard field goal, 3:27. Oilers 3–2. **Drive: 11 plays, 61 yards, 6:56.**

**Second quarter**

- MIN – Gary Anderson 39-yard field goal, 14:53. Vikings 5–3. **Drive: 7 plays, 42 yards, 3:34.**
- TEN – Al Del Greco 33-yard field goal, 10:22. Oilers 6–5. **Drive: 9 plays, 41 yards, 4:31.**
- TEN – Eddie George 2-yard run (Al Del Greco kick), 5:06. Oilers 13–5. **Drive: 7 plays, 65 yards, 2:54.**
- MIN – Gary Anderson 23-yard field goal, 0:18. Oilers 13–8. **Drive: 12 plays, 68 yards, 4:52.**

**Third quarter**

- MIN – Randy Moss 5-yard pass from Randall Cunningham (Randall Cunningham–Randy Moss pass), 9:02. Vikings 16–13. **Drive: 9 plays, 76 yards, 5:58.**
- TEN – Al Del Greco 45-yard field goal, 4:07. Tied 16–16. **Drive: 11 plays, 32 yards, 4:55.**
- MIN – Cris Carter 38-yard pass from Randall Cunningham (Gary Anderson kick), 1:18. Vikings 23–16. **Drive: 6 plays, 79 yards, 2:49.**

**Fourth quarter**

- MIN – Gary Anderson 30-yard field goal, 1:03. Vikings 26–16. **Drive: 6 plays, 9 yards, 1:08.**

**Top passers**

- MIN – Randall Cunningham – 23/35, 235 yards, 2 TD, INT
- TEN – Steve McNair – 16/33, 261 yards

**Top rushers**

- MIN – Robert Smith – 15 rushes, 73 yards
- TEN – Eddie George – 14 rushes, 54 yards, TD

**Top receivers**

- MIN – Cris Carter – 6 receptions, 78 yards, TD
- TEN – Jackie Harris – 4 receptions, 83 yards

The Vikings became the final club to play against Tennessee before they officially became the Titans. The Oilers clawed to a 13–8 halftime lead despite an intentional grounding penalty against Steve McNair that led to a safety. Two Randall Cunningham touchdowns in the third quarter put the game away to a 26–16 Vikings win, the 15th of the season. With this loss the Oilers became the first team in NFL history to have three straight 8–8 seasons.

=== Standings ===
NFC Central
	W	L	T	PCT	PF	PA	STK
^{(1)} Minnesota Vikings	15	1	0	.938	556	296	W8
^{(5)} Green Bay Packers	11	5	0	.688	408	319	W3
Tampa Bay Buccaneers	8	8	0	.500	314	295	W1
Detroit Lions	5	11	0	.313	306	378	L4
Chicago Bears	4	12	0	.250	276	368	L1

== Postseason ==
In the playoffs, the Vikings rolled past the Arizona Cardinals 41–21, and came into the Metrodome heavily favored for their NFC title showdown with the Atlanta Falcons, who had finished 14–2. Leading 20–7 just before halftime, the Vikings controversially called a deep pass play on third down, which led to a Cunningham fumble deep in Minnesota territory. Shortly thereafter, the Falcons scored to cut the lead to 20–14. The Vikings were again leading 27–20 with two minutes left in the fourth quarter and had a chance to potentially put the game out of reach with a field goal. However, kicker Gary Anderson, who had gone 35 for 35 in the regular season, missed a 39-yard attempt from the left hash. He pulled it left. With multiple defensive injuries for the Vikings the Falcons subsequently marched downfield and scored the game-tying touchdown several plays later.

Dennis Green instructed quarterback Randall Cunningham to take a knee on a third down deep in Viking territory with about 30 seconds remaining rather than risk having to punt back to Atlanta following their game-tying touchdown. Minnesota won the coin toss in overtime but failed to score in two overtime possessions. Atlanta eventually won 30–27 in overtime after Morten Andersen's 38-yard field goal.

=== Schedule ===
Round	Date	Opponent	Result	Record	Venue	Attendance
Division	January 10, 1999	Arizona Cardinals	W 41–21	1–0	Hubert H. Humphrey Metrodome	63,760
NFC Championship	January 17, 1999	Atlanta Falcons	L 27–30 (OT)	1–1	Hubert H. Humphrey Metrodome	64,060

=== Game summaries ===
==== NFC Divisional Round: vs (#6) Arizona Cardinals ====
NFC Divisional Playoffs: (#6) Arizona Cardinals at (#1) Minnesota Vikings – Game summary

Quarter	1	2	3	4	Total
Cardinals	0	7	7	7	21
Vikings	7	17	10	7	41

at Hubert H. Humphrey Metrodome, Minneapolis, Minnesota

- Date: January 10
- Game time: 3:15 p.m. CST
- Game weather: None (indoor stadium)
- Game attendance: 63,760
- TV announcers (FOX): Pat Summerall & John Madden
- Recap, Game Book

Game information

First quarter

- MIN – Leroy Hoard 1-yard run (Gary Anderson kick), 7:40. Vikings 7–0. Drive: 13 plays, 80 yards, 7:20.

Second quarter

- MIN – Andrew Glover 15-yard pass from Randall Cunningham (Gary Anderson kick), 12:45. Vikings 14–0. Drive: 4 plays, 62 yards, 1:34.
- MIN – Gary Anderson 34-yard field goal, 11:24. Vikings 17–0. Drive: 4 plays, 0 yards, 1:03.
- ARI – Mario Bates 1-yard run (Chris Jacke kick), 3:32. Vikings 17–7. Drive: 13 plays, 80 yards, 7:52.
- MIN – Leroy Hoard 16-yard pass from Randall Cunningham (Gary Anderson kick), 0:24. Vikings 24–7. Drive: 8 plays, 74 yards, 3:08.

Third quarter

- ARI – Mario Bates 1-yard run (Chris Jacke kick), 7:25. Vikings 24–14. Drive: 14 plays, 80 yards, 7:35.
- MIN – Gary Anderson 20-yard field goal, 3:59. Vikings 27–14. Drive: 6 plays, 54 yards, 3:26.
- MIN – Randy Moss 2-yard pass from Randall Cunningham (Gary Anderson kick), 1:31. Vikings 34–14. Drive: 3 plays, 10 yards, 0:35.

Fourth quarter

- ARI – Mario Bates 1-yard run (Chris Jacke kick), 11:45. Vikings 34–21. Drive: 8 plays, 25 yards, 2:53.
- MIN – Leroy Hoard 6-yard run (Gary Anderson kick), 4:33. Vikings 41–21. Drive: 12 plays, 73 yards, 7:12.

Top passers

- ARI – Jake Plummer – 23/41, 242 yards, 2 INT
- MIN – Randall Cunningham – 17/27, 236 yards, 3 TD, INT

Top rushers

- ARI – Adrian Murrell – 15 rushes, 62 yards
- MIN – Robert Smith – 19 rushes, 124 yards

Top receivers

- ARI – Rob Moore – 6 receptions, 91 yards
- MIN – Cris Carter – 5 receptions, 82 yards

==== NFC Championship Game: vs (#2) Atlanta Falcons ====
NFC Divisional Playoffs: (#2) Atlanta Falcons at (#1) Minnesota Vikings – Game summary

Quarter	1	2	3	4	OT	Total
Falcons	7	7	3	10	3	30
Vikings	7	13	0	7	0	27

at Hubert H. Humphrey Metrodome, Minneapolis, Minnesota

- Date: January 17
- Game time: 11:30 a.m. CST
- Game weather: None (indoor stadium)
- Game attendance: 64,060
- TV announcers (FOX): Pat Summerall & John Madden
- Recap, Game Book

Game information

First quarter

- ATL – Jamal Anderson 5-yard pass from Chris Chandler (Morten Andersen kick), 8:21. Falcons 7–0. Drive: 12 plays, 76 yards, 6:39.
- MIN – Randy Moss 31-yard pass from Randall Cunningham (Gary Anderson kick), 5:33. Tied 7–7. Drive: 5 plays, 80 yards, 2:48.

Second quarter

- MIN – Gary Anderson 29-yard field goal, 9:52. Vikings 10–7. Drive: 12 plays, 49 yards, 6:16.
- MIN – Randall Cunningham 1-yard run (Gary Anderson kick), 5:53. Vikings 17–7. Drive: 6 plays, 33 yards, 3:41.
- MIN – Gary Anderson 35-yard field goal, 2:45. Vikings 20–7. Drive: 5 plays, 39 yards, 1:28.
- ATL – Terance Mathis 14-yard pass from Chris Chandler (Morten Andersen kick), 0:56. Vikings 20–14. Drive: 1 play, 14 yards, 0:03.

Third quarter

- ATL – Morten Andersen 27-yard field goal, 5:36. Vikings 20–17. Drive: 10 plays, 62 yards, 6:03.

Fourth quarter

- MIN – Matthew Hatchette 5-yard pass from Randall Cunningham (Gary Anderson kick), 13:41. Vikings 27–17. Drive: 15 plays, 82 yards, 6:55.
- ATL – Morten Andersen 24-yard field goal, 11:02. Vikings 27–20. Drive: 7 plays, 73 yards, 2:39.
- ATL – Terance Mathis 16-yard pass from Chris Chandler (Morten Andersen kick), 0:49. Tied 27–27. Drive: 8 plays, 71 yards, 1:18.

Overtime

- ATL – Morten Andersen 38-yard field goal, 3:08. Falcons 30–27. Drive: 10 plays, 70 yards, 5:20.

Top passers

- ATL – Chris Chandler – 27/43, 340 yards, 3 TD
- MIN – Randall Cunningham – 29/48, 266 yards, 2 TD

Top rushers

- ATL – Jamal Anderson – 23 rushes, 67 yards
- MIN – Robert Smith – 21 rushes, 71 yards

Top receivers

- ATL – Tony Martin – 5 receptions, 129 yards
- MIN – Randy Moss – 6 receptions, 75 yards, TD

The 16–1 Vikings, boasting the league's first 500-point offense since the 1983 Washington Redskins, were heavy favorites at Hubert H. Humphrey Metrodome and raced to a 20–7 lead in the second quarter off two Randall Cunningham touchdowns (one rushing and a throw to Randy Moss), but at the end of the first half Chris Chandler found Terance Mathis for a 14-yard score. After a Morten Andersen field goal made it 20–17 in the third, the Vikings moved back out to a 10-point lead on another Cunningham TD throw (this one to Matthew Hatchette). In the final 10 minutes of regulation, the Falcons were forced to turn the ball over on downs, but the Vikings fumbled it right back and Andersen kicked another field goal for a 27–20 score. In the final four minutes, Gary Anderson, who had not missed a field goal all season, shanked a 39-yarder to give the Falcons a chance. Chandler led the Falcons downfield and connected with Mathis in the end zone with 49 seconds remaining. The Vikings got the ball in overtime but Eugene Robinson stopped a deep pass to Moss and the Falcons got it back on a punt. Chandler led the Falcons downfield again and Andersen nailed a 38-yard field goal at 11:52 of the extra period; the 30–27 final sent the Falcons to Super Bowl XXXIII.

== Statistics ==
=== Team leaders ===
Category	Player(s)	Value
Passing yards	Randall Cunningham	3,704
Passing touchdowns	Randall Cunningham	34
Rushing yards	Robert Smith	1,187
Rushing touchdowns	Leroy Hoard	9
Receiving yards	Randy Moss	1,313
Receiving touchdowns	Randy Moss	17 *
Points	Gary Anderson	164 *
Kickoff return yards	David Palmer	1,176
Punt return yards	David Palmer	289
Tackles	Ed McDaniel	125
Sacks	John Randle	10.5
Interceptions	Jimmy Hitchcock	7
Forced fumbles	Ed McDaniel; John Randle	3

- Vikings single season record.

=== Best performances ===
- Randall Cunningham, 442 passing yards vs. Green Bay (October 5)
- Randy Moss, 3 receptions, 163 yards, 3 TD at Dallas (November 26)

=== League rankings ===
Category	Total yards	Yards per game	NFL rank (out of 30)
Passing offense	4,328	270.5	1st
Rushing offense	1,936	121.0	11th
Total offense	6,264	391.5	2nd
Passing defense	3,452	215.8	19th
Rushing defense	1,614	100.9	11th
Total defense	5,066	316.6	13th

== Awards and records ==
- Randall Cunningham, Bert Bell Award
- Randy Moss, led rookies in receiving yards (1,313 yards). Moss also set the record for most receiving touchdowns for a rookie, 17, a record that still stands today.
- The Vikings became just the third team to post a 15–1 win–loss record since the implementation of the 16-game schedule in 1978. They joined the 1984 San Francisco 49ers and the 1985 Chicago Bears, but became the first of those teams to fail to win the Super Bowl.
- To date, the only teams to complete a 15–1 season (or better) are the 1984 San Francisco 49ers, the 1985 Chicago Bears, the 1998 Minnesota Vikings, the 2004 Pittsburgh Steelers, the 2007 New England Patriots, the 2011 Green Bay Packers and the 2015 Carolina Panthers. Only the 49ers and Bears capped their seasons with a Super Bowl victory, while the Packers were the only one of the group not to win a playoff game.
- The Vikings' high-powered offense set a record, which stood until the 2007 season, for most points scored in a season with 556. They eclipsed the 1983 Washington Redskins, who scored 541. The 2007 New England Patriots beat the record by scoring 589 points. The 1998 Vikings now rank fifth all time, behind the 606 points scored by the 2013 Denver Broncos. It is worth noting that the 1998 Vikings followed in the footsteps of the 1983 Redskins and set a mark the 2007 Patriots and 2013 Broncos matched: none of these teams won the Super Bowl (in fact, the Vikings are the only one of these four squads not to have won their conference championship).
