= 1997 All-Pro Team =

Official list of the best NFL players in 1997

The 1997 All-Pro Team is composed of the National Football League players that were named to the Associated Press, Pro Football Writers Association, and The Sporting News All-Pro Teams in 1997. Both first and second teams are listed for the AP team. These are the three teams that are included in Total Football II: The Official Encyclopedia of the National Football League. In 1997 the Pro Football Writers Association and Pro Football Weekly combined their All-pro teams, a practice with continues through 2008.

== Teams ==
Offense
Position	First team	Second team
Quarterback	Brett Favre, Green Bay Packers (AP, PFWA, TSN)	Steve Young, San Francisco 49ers (AP-2)
Running back	Barry Sanders, Detroit Lions (AP, PFWA, TSN); Terrell Davis, Denver Broncos (AP, PFWA, TSN)	Jerome Bettis, Pittsburgh Steelers (AP-2)
Fullback	Mike Alstott, Tampa Bay Buccaneers (AP)	Charles Way, New York Giants (AP-2)
Wide receiver	Rob Moore, Arizona Cardinals (AP, PFWA); Herman Moore, Detroit Lions (AP, PFWA, TSN); Tim Brown, Oakland Raiders (TSN)	Tim Brown, Oakland Raiders (AP-2); Yancey Thigpen, Pittsburgh Steelers (AP-2)
Tight end	Shannon Sharpe, Denver Broncos (AP, PFWA, TSN)	Wesley Walls, Carolina Panthers (AP-2)
Tackle	Tony Boselli, Jacksonville Jaguars (AP, PFWA, TSN); Jonathan Ogden, Baltimore Ravens (AP, PFWA, TSN)	Todd Steussie, Minnesota Vikings (AP-2); Willie Roaf, New Orleans Saints (AP-2)
Guard	Larry Allen, Dallas Cowboys (AP, PFWA, TSN); Dave Szott, Kansas City Chiefs (AP, PFWA); Randall McDaniel, Minnesota Vikings (TSN)	Will Shields, Kansas City Chiefs (AP-2); Randall McDaniel, Minnesota Vikings (AP-2)
Center	Dermontti Dawson, Pittsburgh Steelers (AP, PFWA, TSN)	

Special teams
Position	First team	Second team
Kicker	Richie Cunningham, Dallas Cowboys (AP, TSN); Pete Stoyanovich, Kansas City Chiefs (PFWA)	Jason Hanson, Detroit Lions (AP-2)
Punter	Bryan Barker, Jacksonville Jaguars (AP, PFWA); Matt Turk, Washington Redskins (TSN)	Matt Turk, Washington Redskins (AP-2)
Kick Returner	Eric Metcalf, San Diego Chargers (AP)	Darrien Gordon, Denver Broncos (AP-2t); Michael Bates, Carolina Panthers (AP-2t)
Punt Returner	Darrien Gordon, Denver Broncos (PFWA, TSN)	

Defense
Position	First team	Second team
Defensive end	Bruce Smith, Buffalo Bills (AP, PFWA, TSN); Michael Strahan, New York Giants (AP, PFWA, TSN)	Neil Smith, Denver Broncos (AP-2); Chuck Smith, Atlanta Falcons (AP-2t); Reggie White, Green Bay Packers (AP-2t)
Defensive tackle	John Randle, Minnesota Vikings (AP, PFWA, TSN); Dana Stubblefield, San Francisco 49ers (AP, PFWA, TSN)	Warren Sapp, Tampa Bay Buccaneers (AP-2); Ted Washington, Buffalo Bills (AP-2)
Middle linebacker	Hardy Nickerson, Tampa Bay Buccaneers (AP); Levon Kirkland, Pittsburgh Steelers (AP, PFWA, TSN)	Winfred Tubbs, New Orleans Saints (AP-2); Ray Lewis, Baltimore Ravens (AP-2t); Junior Seau, San Diego Chargers (AP-2t)
Outside linebacker	Jessie Armstead, New York Giants (AP, PFWA, TSN); John Mobley, Denver Broncos (AP, PFWA, TSN)	Derrick Brooks, Tampa Bay Buccaneers (AP-2); Chris Slade, New England Patriots (AP-2)
Cornerback	Aeneas Williams, Arizona Cardinals (AP, PFWA, TSN); Deion Sanders, Dallas Cowboys (AP, PFWA, TSN)	Cris Dishman, Washington Redskins (AP-2); James Hasty, Kansas City Chiefs (AP-2t); Doug Evans, Green Bay Packers (AP-2t)
Safety	Carnell Lake, Pittsburgh Steelers (AP, PFWA, TSN); LeRoy Butler, Green Bay Packers (AP, PFWA, TSN)	Merton Hanks, San Francisco 49ers (AP-2); Darryl Williams, Seattle Seahawks (AP-2)

== Key ==
- AP = Associated Press first-team All-Pro
- AP-2 = Associated Press second-team All-Pro
- AP-2t = Tied for second-team All-Pro in the AP vote
- PFWA = Pro Football Writers Association All-Pro
- TSN = The Sporting News All-Pro
