= 1999 Pro Bowl =

National Football League all-star game

1999 NFL Pro Bowl
NFC	AFC
10	23
Head coach: Dennis Green (Minnesota Vikings)	Head coach: Bill Belichick (New York Jets)
	1	2	3	4	Total
NFC	3	0	7	0	10
AFC	7	3	10	3	23
- Date: February 7, 1999
- Stadium: Aloha Stadium; Honolulu, Hawaii
- Co-MVPs: Keyshawn Johnson (New York Jets), Ty Law (New England Patriots)
- Referee: Dick Hantak
- Attendance: 50,075

TV in the United States
- Network: ABC
- Announcers: Al Michaels, Dan Dierdorf, Boomer Esiason, Lesley Visser and Dan Fouts

The 1999 Pro Bowl was the NFL's all-star game for the 1998 season. The game was played on February 7, 1999, at Aloha Stadium in Honolulu. For the fourth time in the past five years, the AFC beat the NFC, doing so 23–10. Keyshawn Johnson of the New York Jets and Ty Law of the New England Patriots were the game's MVPs. This game was also the last game in the careers of Denver Broncos quarterback John Elway and of Detroit Lions running back Barry Sanders. The referee was Dick Hantak.

== AFC ==
=== Quarterbacks ===
- John Elway – Denver Broncos
- Doug Flutie – Buffalo Bills
- Vinny Testaverde – New York Jets

=== Running backs ===
- Terrell Davis – Denver Broncos
- Marshall Faulk – Indianapolis Colts
- Sam Gash – Buffalo Bills
- Eddie George – Tennessee Oilers
- Curtis Martin – New York Jets

=== Wide receivers ===
- Keyshawn Johnson – New York Jets
- Jermaine Lewis – Baltimore Ravens
- Ed McCaffrey – Denver Broncos
- Eric Moulds – Buffalo Bills
- Jimmy Smith – Jacksonville Jaguars

=== Tight Ends ===
- Ben Coates – New England Patriots
- Shannon Sharpe – Denver Broncos

=== Offensive linemen ===
- Tony Boselli – Jacksonville Jaguars
- Ruben Brown – Buffalo Bills
- Dermontti Dawson – Pittsburgh Steelers
- Tony Jones – Denver Broncos
- Bruce Matthews – Tennessee Titans
- Tom Nalen – Denver Broncos
- Jonathan Ogden – Baltimore Ravens
- Mark Schlereth- Denver Broncos
- Will Shields – Kansas City Chiefs

=== Defensive linemen ===
- Tim Bowens – Miami Dolphins
- Michael McCrary – Baltimore Ravens
- Darrell Russell – Oakland Raiders
- Michael Sinclair – Seattle Seahawks
- Bruce Smith – Buffalo Bills
- Ted Washington – Buffalo Bills
- Cortez Kennedy – Seattle Seahawks

=== Linebackers ===
- Zach Thomas – Miami Dolphins
- Chad Brown – Seattle Seahawks
- Mo Lewis – New York Jets
- Ray Lewis – Baltimore Ravens
- Bill Romanowski – Denver Broncos
- Junior Seau – San Diego Chargers

=== Defensive backs ===
- Rodney Harrison – San Diego Chargers
- Ty Law – New England Patriots
- Aaron Glenn - New York Jets
- Lawyer Milloy – New England Patriots
- Shawn Springs – Seattle Seahawks
- Sam Madison – Miami Dolphins
- Steve Atwater – Denver Broncos
- Charles Woodson – Oakland Raiders

=== Punter ===
- Craig Hentrich – Tennessee Oilers

=== Kicker ===
- Jason Elam - Denver Broncos

== NFC ==
=== Quarterbacks ===
- Chris Chandler – Atlanta Falcons
- Randall Cunningham – Minnesota Vikings
- Steve Young – San Francisco 49ers

=== Running backs ===
- Mike Alstott – Tampa Bay Buccaneers
- Jamal Anderson – Atlanta Falcons
- Garrison Hearst – San Francisco 49ers
- Barry Sanders – Detroit Lions
- Emmitt Smith – Dallas Cowboys
- Robert Smith – Minnesota Vikings

=== Wide receivers ===
- Michael Bates – Carolina Panthers
- Cris Carter – Minnesota Vikings
- Antonio Freeman – Green Bay Packers
- Randy Moss – Minnesota Vikings
- Roell Preston – Green Bay Packers
- Jerry Rice – San Francisco 49ers

=== Tight Ends ===
- Mark Chmura – Green Bay Packers
- Wesley Walls – Carolina Panthers

=== Offensive linemen ===
- Larry Allen – Dallas Cowboys
- Jeff Christy – Minnesota Vikings
- Kevin Gogan – San Francisco 49ers
- Randall McDaniel – Minnesota Vikings
- William Roaf – New Orleans Saints
- Todd Steussie – Minnesota Vikings
- Tony Mayberry – Tampa Bay Buccaneers
- Nate Newton – Dallas Cowboys

=== Defensive linemen ===
- Warren Sapp – Tampa Bay Buccaneers
- Michael Strahan – New York Giants
- John Randle – Minnesota Vikings
- Kevin Carter – St. Louis Rams
- Robert Porcher – Detroit Lions
- Luther Elliss – Detroit Lions
- Bryant Young – San Francisco 49ers
- Leon Lett - Dallas Cowboys

=== Linebackers ===
- Jessie Armstead – New York Giants
- Derrick Brooks – Tampa Bay Buccaneers
- Ed McDaniel – Minnesota Vikings
- Jessie Tuggle – Atlanta Falcons
- Kevin Greene – Carolina Panthers
- Winfred Tubbs- San Francisco 49ers
- Hardy Nickerson – Tampa Bay Buccaneers

=== Defensive backs ===
- Ray Buchanan – Atlanta Falcons
- LeRoy Butler – Green Bay Packers
- Eugene Robinson – Atlanta Falcons
- Deion Sanders – Dallas Cowboys
- Aeneas Williams – Arizona Cardinals
- Darren Woodson – Dallas Cowboys

=== Punter ===
- Mitch Berger – Minnesota Vikings

=== Kicker ===
- Gary Anderson - Minnesota Vikings
