= Todd Steussie =

American football player (born 1970)

No. 73, 75, 79
- Position: Offensive tackle

Personal information
- Born: December 1, 1970 (age 55); Canoga Park, California, U.S.
- Listed height: 6 ft 6 in (1.98 m)
- Listed weight: 310 lb (141 kg)

Career information
- High school: Agoura (Agoura Hills, California)
- College: California (1989–1993)
- NFL draft: 1994: 1st round, 19th overall pick

Career history
- Minnesota Vikings (1994–2000); Carolina Panthers (2001–2003); Tampa Bay Buccaneers (2004–2005); St. Louis Rams (2006–2007)

Awards and highlights
- 2× Second-team All-Pro (1997, 1998); 2× Pro Bowl (1997, 1998); PFWA All-Rookie Team (1994); First-team All-American (1993); Morris Trophy (1993); 2× First-team All-Pac-10 (1992, 1993); Second-team All-Pac-10 (1991)

Career NFL statistics
- Games played: 213
- Games started: 185
- Fumble recoveries: 7
- Stats at Pro Football Reference

Todd Edward Steussie (/ˈstjuːsi/; born December 1, 1970) is an American former professional football player who was an offensive tackle in the National Football League (NFL). He played college football for the California Golden Bears and was selected by the Minnesota Vikings in the first round of the 1994 NFL draft with the 19th overall pick. Steussie played for the Vikings, Carolina Panthers, Tampa Bay Buccaneers, and St. Louis Rams.

== Early life and college ==
Steussie attended Agoura High School graduating in 1989 in Agoura Hills, California, and was a letterman in football. In football, he was a first team All-State selection as a defensive lineman.

Steussie played collegiately at the University of California, Berkeley, where he was a three-time All-Pac-10 selection (twice first-team). As a senior he was honored with the Morris Trophy as the conference's best offensive lineman, and was selected as a first-team All-American. In 2013 he was inducted into the school's hall of fame.

== Professional career ==
Steussie was selected in the first round (19th pick overall) of the 1994 NFL draft by the Minnesota Vikings. He was the fourth offensive tackle to be drafted, after Bernard Williams, Wayne Gandy, and Aaron Taylor.

He would go on to become part of a big offensive line with the Vikings alongside Randall McDaniel, Jeff Christy, David Dixon, and Korey Stringer, and was named to two All-Pro teams and two Pro Bowls during his seven-year tenure with the Vikings. (The Pro Bowls following the 1997 and 1998 seasons). He played in 10 playoff games with the Vikings including 2 NFC Championship games (1998+2000 seasons)

Steussie was signed by the Carolina Panthers before the 2001 season and was part of an offensive line that allowed team record 29 sacks during a 1–15 season. Two years later, Steussie made his first Super Bowl appearance in Super Bowl XXXVIII. In 2004, he was released by the Panthers.

Steussie would play the next two seasons with the Tampa Bay Buccaneers and joined the St. Louis Rams in 2006, where he became a starter for the first time since the 5th game of the 2004 season. He started 15 games in 2006 (8 at LT, 7 at LG). During this year, he helped Steven Jackson and Marc Bulger to breakout Pro Bowl seasons. He was given an injury settlement after undergoing foot surgery on August 31, 2007. Before week 12, Steussie was signed by the Rams after his foot fully recovered from surgery. He came back to the Rams and started 4 days later. Steussie then started the final six games. He was a free agent after the 2007 season.
