= 1998 All-Pro Team =

Official list of the best NFL players in 1998

The 1998 All-Pro Team is composed of the National Football League players that were named to the Associated Press, Pro Football Writers Association, and The Sporting News All-Pro Teams in 1998. Both first and second teams are listed for the AP team. These are the three teams that are included in Total Football II: The Official Encyclopedia of the National Football League. In 1998, the Pro Football Writers Association and Pro Football Weekly combined their All-pro teams, a practice which continues through 2026.

== Teams ==
Offense
Position	First team	Second team
Quarterback	Randall Cunningham, Minnesota Vikings (AP, PFWA); Steve Young, San Francisco 49ers (TSN)	Steve Young, San Francisco 49ers (AP-2)
Running back	Jamal Anderson, Atlanta Falcons (AP, PFWA, TSN); Terrell Davis, Denver Broncos (AP, PFWA, TSN)	Marshall Faulk, Indianapolis Colts (AP-2); Barry Sanders, Detroit Lions (AP-2)
Fullback	Mike Alstott, Tampa Bay Buccaneers (AP)	Sam Gash, Buffalo Bills (AP-2)
Wide receiver	Antonio Freeman, Green Bay Packers (AP, PFWA, TSN); Randy Moss, Minnesota Vikings (AP, PFWA, TSN)	Eric Moulds, Buffalo Bills (AP-2); Ed McCaffrey, Denver Broncos (AP-2t); Jimmy Smith, Jacksonville Jaguars (AP-2t)
Tight end	Shannon Sharpe, Denver Broncos (AP, PFWA, TSN)	Ben Coates, New England Patriots (AP-2)
Tackle	Tony Boselli, Jacksonville Jaguars (AP, PFWA, TSN); Larry Allen, Dallas Cowboys (AP, PFWA, TSN)	Todd Steussie, Minnesota Vikings, (AP-2); Jonathan Ogden, Baltimore Ravens (AP-2)
Guard	Randall McDaniel, Minnesota Vikings (AP, PFWA, TSN); Bruce Matthews, Tennessee Oilers (AP, PFWA, TSN)	Kevin Gogan, San Francisco 49ers (AP-2); Ruben Brown, Buffalo Bills (AP-2)
Center	Dermontti Dawson, Pittsburgh Steelers (AP, PFWA, TSN)	Kevin Mawae, New York Jets (AP-2t); Jeff Christy, Minnesota Vikings (AP-2t)

Special teams
Position	First team	Second team
Placekicker	Gary Anderson, Minnesota Vikings (AP, PFWA, TSN)	Jason Elam, Denver Broncos (AP-2)
Punter	Craig Hentrich, Tennessee Oilers (AP, PFWA, TSN)	Matt Turk, Washington Redskins (AP-2)
Kick returner	Jermaine Lewis, Baltimore Ravens (AP); Roell Preston, Green Bay Packers (PFWA)	Roell Preston, Green Bay Packers (AP-2)
Punt returner	Jermaine Lewis, Baltimore Ravens (TSN); Terry Fair, Detroit Lions (PFWA)	
Special teams	Bennie Thompson, Baltimore Ravens (PFWA)	

Defense
Position	First team	Second team
Defensive end	Michael Strahan, New York Giants (AP, PFWA); Reggie White, Green Bay Packers (AP, PFWA, TSN); Michael McCrary, Baltimore Ravens (TSN)	Michael Sinclair, Seattle Seahawks (AP-2); Bruce Smith, Buffalo Bills (AP-2)
Defensive tackle	Darrell Russell, Oakland Raiders (AP, PFWA); John Randle, Minnesota Vikings (AP, PFWA, TSN); Bryant Young, San Francisco 49ers (TSN)	Warren Sapp, Tampa Bay Buccaneers (AP-2); La'Roi Glover, New Orleans Saints (AP-2t); Bryant Young, San Francisco 49ers (AP-2t)
Inside Linebacker	Junior Seau, San Diego Chargers (AP, PFWA, TSN-OLB); Zach Thomas, Miami Dolphins (AP); Ray Lewis, Baltimore Ravens (TSN)	Jessie Tuggle, Atlanta Falcons (AP-2); Ray Lewis, Baltimore Ravens (AP-2)
Outside linebacker	Chad Brown, Seattle Seahawks (AP, PFWA, TSN); Mo Lewis, New York Jets (AP, PFWA)	Dwayne Rudd, Minnesota Vikings (AP-2); Derrick Brooks, Tampa Bay Buccaneers (AP-2)
Cornerback	Ty Law, New England Patriots (AP, PFWA, TSN); Deion Sanders, Dallas Cowboys (AP, PFWA, TSN)	Sam Madison, Miami Dolphins (AP-2); Ray Buchanan, Atlanta Falcons (AP-2)
Safety	Rodney Harrison, San Diego Chargers (AP, PFWA, TSN-t); LeRoy Butler, Green Bay Packers (AP, PFWA, TSN); Robert Griffith, Minnesota Vikings (TSN-t); Darren Woodson, Dallas Cowboys (TSN-t)	Robert Griffith, Minnesota Vikings (AP-2); Lawyer Milloy, New England Patriots (AP-2)

== Key ==
- AP = Associated Press first-team All-Pro
- AP-2 = Associated Press second-team All-Pro
- AP-2t = Tied for second-team All-Pro in the AP vote
- PFWA = Pro Football Writers Association All-NFL
- TSN = The Sporting News All-Pro
