= Ramos McDonald =

American football player (born 1976)

No. 34, 35, 25
- Position: Cornerback

Personal information
- Born: April 30, 1976 (age 50); Dallas, Texas, U.S.
- Listed height: 5 ft 11 in (1.80 m)
- Listed weight: 195 lb (88 kg)

Career information
- High school: Liberty-Eylau (Texarkana, Texas)
- College: New Mexico
- NFL draft: 1998: 3rd round, 80th overall pick

Career history
- Minnesota Vikings (1998–1999); San Francisco 49ers (1999); New York Giants (2000); Oakland Raiders (2001)*; Seattle Seahawks (2002)*
- * Offseason or practice squad member only

Career NFL statistics
- Tackles: 56
- Interceptions: 1
- Passes defended: 11
- Stats at Pro Football Reference

Ramos McDonald (born April 30, 1976) is an American former professional football player who was a cornerback in the National Football League (NFL). He played three years in the NFL for the Minnesota Vikings, San Francisco 49ers, and New York Giants. He was selected by the Vikings in the third round of the 1998 NFL draft with the 80th overall pick.
