= Andrew Glover =

American football player (born 1967)

No. 87, 82
- Position: Tight end

Personal information
- Born: August 12, 1967 (age 59); New Orleans, Louisiana, U.S.
- Listed height: 6 ft 6 in (1.98 m)
- Listed weight: 250 lb (113 kg)

Career information
- High school: East Ascension (Gonzales, Louisiana)
- College: Grambling State (1987–1990)
- NFL draft: 1991: 10th round, 274th overall pick

Career history
- Los Angeles / Oakland Raiders (1991–1996); Minnesota Vikings (1997–1999); New Orleans Saints (2000); Oakland Raiders (2001)*
- * Offseason or practice squad member only

Career NFL statistics
- Receptions: 208
- Receiving yards: 2,478
- Receiving touchdowns: 24
- Stats at Pro Football Reference

Andrew Lee Glover (born August 12, 1967) is an American former professional football player who was a tight end in the National Football League (NFL). He played college football for the Grambling State Tigers and was selected 274th overall by the Los Angeles Raiders in the tenth round of the 1991 NFL draft. Glover attended East Ascension High School in Gonzales, Louisiana.

Glover and his wife, Mary, were the main plaintiffs in a class action suit against the NFL for its negligence in preventing brain injuries to its players.

== NFL career statistics ==
Legend
**Bold**	Career high

=== Regular season ===
Year	Team	Games		Receiving				
Year	Team	GP	GS	Rec	Yds	Avg	Lng	TD
1991	RAI	16	1	5	45	9.0	18	3
1992	RAI	16	2	15	178	11.9	30	1
1993	RAI	15	0	4	55	13.8	26	1
1994	RAI	16	16	33	371	11.2	27	2
1995	OAK	16	9	26	220	8.5	25	3
1996	OAK	14	4	9	101	11.2	25	1
1997	MIN	13	11	32	378	11.8	**43**	3
1998	MIN	16	12	**35**	**522**	**14.9**	36	**5**
1999	MIN	16	13	28	327	11.7	31	1
2000	NOR	16	14	21	281	13.4	39	4
Career		154	82	208	2,478	11.9	43	24

=== Playoffs ===
Year	Team	Games		Receiving				
Year	Team	GP	GS	Rec	Yds	Avg	Lng	TD
1991	RAI	1	0	0	0	0.0	0	0
1997	MIN	2	1	5	**102**	**20.4**	**31**	0
1998	MIN	2	1	**7**	56	8.0	15	**1**
1999	MIN	2	2	1	12	12.0	12	0
2000	NOR	2	2	2	21	10.5	16	0
Career		9	6	15	191	12.7	31	1
