= Terence Moore =

American sports journalist

Terence Moore is an American sports journalist based in Atlanta.

== Life and career ==
Moore was born in South Bend, Indiana. Courtesy of his father who was transferred several times across the Midwest as an AT&T supervisor, Moore went to high school in Cincinnati and in Chicago before he finished his prep days in Milwaukee, where he starred in baseball and football and became news editor of the high school newspaper. Moore majored in Economics at Miami University in Oxford, Ohio, where he graduated in 1978 with a bachelor's degree in business.

Early in his career, Moore spent three years at The Cincinnati Enquirer. He then worked for five years at The San Francisco Examiner. Moore subsequently worked for The Atlanta Journal-Constitution (AJC) for nearly 25 years, where he was a sports columnist, from December 1984 through April 2009, when he took a voluntary buyout to devote his time to television and Internet work. He has voted for Baseball Hall of Famers since 1991, which is the longest stretch ever for a Black member of the Baseball Writers' Association of America (BBWAA).

Moore also appeared regularly on "The Ed Show" among other MSNBC entities, and he is part of various episodes of the NFL Network's Top Ten list, along with multiple "30 for 30" shows on ESPN. In addition, he has a regular segment every Sunday night on the highly rated "Sports Zone" show, which appears on Atlanta's WSB-TV (Channel 2), the most-watched ABC affiliate in the country. As for the Internet, Moore is a national columnist for Forbes.com after serving in that same role for AOL FanHouse, Sports on Earth.com, MLB.com and CNN.com. He also is a contributing editor to Atlanta Magazine.

Moore has written two books: The Real Hank Aaron and Red Brick Magic: Sean McVay, John Harbaugh and Miami University's Cradle of Coaches.
