= Chuck Evans (fullback) =

American football player (1967–2008)

No. 29
- Position: Fullback

Personal information
- Born: April 16, 1967; Augusta, Georgia, U.S.
- Died: October 12, 2008 (aged 41); Atlanta, Georgia, U.S.
- Listed height: 6 ft 1 in (1.85 m)
- Listed weight: 240 lb (109 kg)

Career information
- High school: Glenn Hills (Augusta)
- College: Clark Atlanta
- NFL draft: 1992: 11th round, 295th overall pick

Career history
- Minnesota Vikings (1992–1998); Baltimore Ravens (1999–2000)

Awards and highlights
- Super Bowl champion (XXXV)

Career NFL statistics
- Rushing yards: 498
- Rushing average: 3.2
- Rushing touchdowns: 4
- Stats at Pro Football Reference

Charles Evans (April 16, 1967 – October 12, 2008) was an American professional football fullback who played for the Minnesota Vikings and Baltimore Ravens. He retired after the 2000 NFL season after playing in the National Football League (NFL) for eight years.

== Early life ==
Evans went to Glenn Hills High School in Augusta, Georgia and went to college at Clark Atlanta University. Charles was also a veteran of the United States Marine Corps.

== NFL career ==
Evans was drafted in the 11th round of the 1992 NFL draft by the Minnesota Vikings. Evans might be best known for being the starting fullback for the 1998 Minnesota Vikings which scored the most points by a team (556) in a season in NFL history. He played the fullback position, which required him to block, catch the ball out of the back field, and every once in a while carry the ball.

His best year statistically was his first with the Baltimore Ravens in 1999. He had 38 carries for 134 yards and 32 receptions for 235 yards and a touchdown. He won a Super Bowl ring with the Ravens in 2000. Around the NFL he was considered among the top in the league at his position.

== Professional career ==
=== Minnesota Vikings ===
Evans was selected by the Vikings in the 11th round of the 1992 NFL draft with the 295th overall pick. He was drafted from Clark Atlanta University, a Division II school. He went on to play in three games as a rookie and became a full-time player in his second year. Charles thrived as a role player and became one of offensive coordinator Brian Billick's favorite players. He was a key part of the record breaking 1998 Minnesota Vikings offense that set the record for most points in a season (556).

=== Baltimore Ravens ===
After a record breaking year in 1998, Brian Billick was given the head coaching job of the Baltimore Ravens. A few players, including Chuck Evans, decided to follow him. In 1999, Evans had his most productive year offensively, and the newly coached team finished with an 8–8 record. Evans only participated in one game in the 2000 season, but earned a ring as the team went on to win Super Bowl XXXV.

=== Death ===
Chuck Evans died on October 12, 2008 in Atlanta, of heart failure. He was 41 years old.

== Career statistics ==
Year	Team	G	Rushing				Receiving			
Year	Team	G	Att	Yards	AVG	TD	Rec.	Yards	AVG	TD
1993	MIN	3	14	32	2.3	0	4	39	9.8	0
1994	MIN	14	6	20	3.3	0	1	2	2.0	0
1995	MIN	16	19	59	3.1	1	18	119	6.6	1
1996	MIN	16	13	29	2.2	0	22	135	6.1	0
1997	MIN	16	43	157	3.7	2	21	152	7.2	0
1998	MIN	16	23	67	2.9	1	12	84	7.0	0
1999	BAL	16	38	134	3.5	0	32	235	7.3	1
2000	BAL	1	0	0	0	0	0	0	0	0
Total		97	156	498	3.2	4	110	766	7.0	2
