= Matthew Hatchette =

American football player (born 1974)

Matt Hatchette
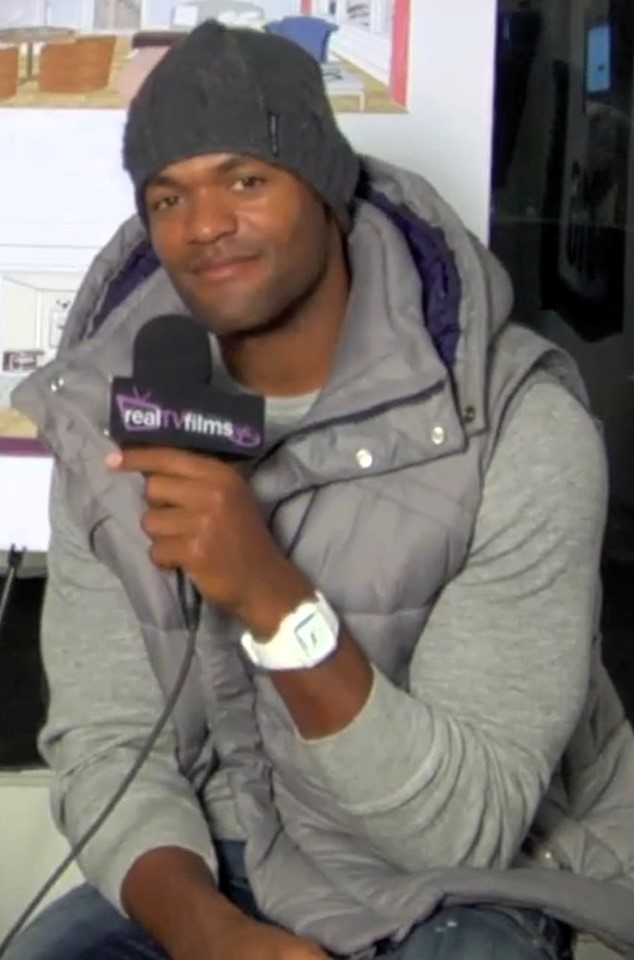
- Hatchette interviewed in 2014

No. 89, 19, 81, 1
- Position: Wide receiver

Personal information
- Born: May 1, 1974 (age 52); Jefferson, Ohio, U.S.
- Listed height: 6 ft 3 in (1.91 m)
- Listed weight: 200 lb (91 kg)

Career information
- High school: Delphos Jefferson
- College: Mercyhurst; Langston
- NFL draft: 1997: 7th round, 235th overall pick

Career history

Playing
- Minnesota Vikings (1997–2000); New York Jets (2001); Oakland Raiders (2002)*; Amsterdam Admirals (2003); Jacksonville Jaguars (2003)
- * Offseason or practice squad member only

Coaching
- Pierce College (2015) Offensive coordinator and quarterbacks coach; Orange Lutheran HS (CA) (2016) Offensive coordinator and quarterbacks coach; Long Beach Poly HS (CA) (2017) Offensive coordinator and quarterbacks coach; Loyola HS (CA) (2018–2024) Offensive coordinator and quarterbacks coach; Huntington Beach HS (CA) (2025–present) Head coach

Awards and highlights
- All-NFL Europe (2003)

Career NFL statistics
- Receptions: 60
- Receiving yards: 887
- Receiving touchdowns: 6
- Stats at Pro Football Reference

Matthew Isaac Hatchette (born May 1, 1974) is an American former professional football player who played wide receiver for eight regular seasons for the Minnesota Vikings, New York Jets, and Jacksonville Jaguars. He was selected in the seventh round of the 1997 NFL draft.

== NFL career ==
During his career, he caught 60 passes for 887 yards and six touchdowns, averaging 14.8 yards per catch. His playoff statistics are six receptions for 39 yards and two touchdowns.

Hatchette signed with the Oakland Raiders in 2002, but was released in the pre-season due to a serious shoulder injury.

Hatchette played one season for the Amsterdam Admirals, an NFL Europe team, in 2003. He was named to the All-NFL Europe Team that year and broke the league's receiving records in number of passes caught, yardage, and touchdowns.

Following his success in Amsterdam, Hatchette signed with the Jacksonville Jaguars in 2003. In Jacksonville, he played in six games, catching 15 passes for 203 yards and two touchdowns. He was released following the 2003 season and retired shortly thereafter.

== Coaching career ==
Hatchette was offensive coordinator and quarterbacks coach at Pierce Junior College in 2015, Orange Lutheran High School in 2016, Long Beach Poly High School in 2017, and Loyola High School from 2018 to 2024.

Hatchette became the head football coach at Huntington Beach High School in February 2025.
