= Ed McDaniel =

American football player (born 1969)

No. 58
- Position: Linebacker

Personal information
- Born: February 23, 1969 (age 57); Batesburg-Leesville, South Carolina, U.S.
- Listed height: 5 ft 11 in (1.80 m)
- Listed weight: 230 lb (104 kg)

Career information
- High school: Batesburg-Leesville
- College: Clemson (1988–1991)
- NFL draft: 1992: 5th round, 125th overall pick

Career history
- Minnesota Vikings (1992–2001)

Awards and highlights
- Pro Bowl (1998); NFL forced fumbles co-leader (1995); Minnesota Vikings All-Mall of America Field Team; Third-team All-American (1991); First-team All-ACC (1991)

Career NFL statistics
- Tackles: 796
- Sacks: 19.5
- Interceptions: 4
- Interception yards: 21
- Forced fumbles: 15
- Fumble recoveries: 5
- Stats at Pro Football Reference

Edward McDaniel (born March 23, 1969) is an American former professional football player who was a linebacker for the Minnesota Vikings in the National Football League (NFL). He played college football for the Clemson Tigers and was selected by Minnesota in the fifth round of the 1992 NFL draft with the 125th overall pick. He spent his entire professional career with the Vikings.

Pre-draft measurables
Height	Weight	Arm length	Hand span	40-yard dash	10-yard split	20-yard split	20-yard shuttle	Vertical jump	Broad jump	Bench press
5 ft 11 1/4 in (1.81 m)	232 lb (105 kg)	31 5/8 in (0.80 m)	9 1/2 in (0.24 m)	4.80 s	1.70 s	2.74 s	4.24 s	33.5 in (0.85 m)	9 ft 8 in (2.95 m)	18 reps
