= Jeff Christy =

American football player (born 1969)

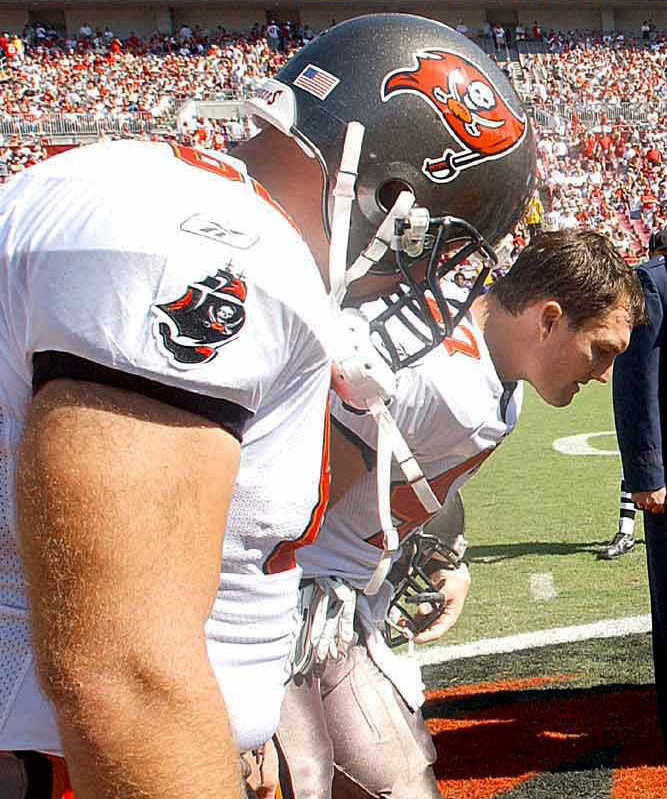
- Christy (left) with John Lynch in 2002

No. 62
- Position: Center

Personal information
- Born: February 3, 1969 (age 57); Natrona Heights, Pennsylvania, U.S.
- Listed height: 6 ft 2 in (1.88 m)
- Listed weight: 285 lb (129 kg)

Career information
- High school: Freeport Area Senior (Freeport, Pennsylvania)
- College: Pittsburgh (1987–1991)
- NFL draft: 1992: 4th round, 91st overall pick

Career history
- Phoenix Cardinals (1992)*; Minnesota Vikings (1993–1999); Tampa Bay Buccaneers (2000–2002)
- * Offseason or practice squad member only

Awards and highlights
- Super Bowl champion (XXXVII); First-team All-Pro (1999); Second-team All-Pro (1998); 3× Pro Bowl (1998–2000); Second-team All-East (1991)

Career NFL statistics
- Games played: 148
- Games started: 139
- Fumble recoveries: 1
- Stats at Pro Football Reference

Jeffrey Allen Christy (born February 3, 1969) is an American former professional football player who was a center for the Arizona Cardinals, Minnesota Vikings, and Tampa Bay Buccaneers of the National Football League (NFL). He played college football for the Pittsburgh Panthers.

== Early life ==
Christy was a starter during all four of his years at the Freeport Senior High School, playing as a fullback, linebacker, kicker and punter. During this time, he rushed for 2,842 total yards, made 340 career tackles, and scored 337 points. He also set nine school records, including the most points in a season (208, which was also a state record) and career, most touchdowns in a season (26) and career (45), and most field goals in a season (6).

Christy attended the University of Pittsburgh, where he received all-Big East first-team honors as a senior.

On September 21, 2007, the Freeport Senior High School retired Jeff Christy's number, 40. It was the first ever number retirement in the school's history.

Christy is now married to Kristen, with two daughters, Nicolette and Kennedy and a son, Mac. He currently resides in Saxonburg, Pennsylvania.

== Professional career ==
In 1992, Christy was selected with the 91st overall pick in the fourth round by the Phoenix Cardinals. He was cut by the team and would miss the entire 1992 season. He was signed by the Minnesota Vikings in 1993 and played there until 1999. During this span he selected to both the Pro Bowl and All-Pro teams in 1998 and 1999. Christy signed with the Tampa Bay Buccaneers in 2000. Jeff Christy was filling a major need for Tampa Bay, who was trying to improve an offensive line that ranked 28th of 31 teams that previous season. That season, he was selected to a third Pro Bowl and started every game, including Super Bowl XXXVII against the Oakland Raiders. Throughout his career, Jeff started 139 out of 148 of his games played. In August 2001, Jeff Christy injured his medial collateral ligament (MCL) and kept him sidelined for three to five weeks. Christy played for the Buccaneers until his retirement in 2003.
