= Randall McDaniel =

American football player (born 1964)

- McDaniel in 2007

No. 64
- Position: Guard

Personal information
- Born: December 19, 1964 (age 61); Phoenix, Arizona, U.S.
- Listed height: 6 ft 3 in (1.91 m)
- Listed weight: 276 lb (125 kg)

Career information
- High school: Agua Fria (Avondale, Arizona)
- College: Arizona State (1984–1987)
- NFL draft: 1988: 1st round, 19th overall pick

Career history
- Minnesota Vikings (1988–1999); Tampa Bay Buccaneers (2000–2001)

Awards and highlights
- 7× First-team All-Pro (1990, 1992–1996, 1998); 2× Second-team All-Pro (1991, 1997); 12× Pro Bowl (1989–2000); NFL 1990s All-Decade Team; NFL 100th Anniversary All-Time Team; PFWA All-Rookie Team (1988); Minnesota Vikings Ring of Honor; 50 Greatest Vikings; Minnesota Vikings 40th Anniversary Team; Consensus All-American (1987); First-team All-American (1986); Morris Trophy (1987); 2× First-team All-Pac-10 (1986, 1987); Rose Bowl champion (1986); Freedom Bowl champion (1987)

Career NFL statistics
- Games played: 222
- Games started: 220
- Fumble recoveries: 2
- Stats at Pro Football Reference
- Pro Football Hall of Fame
- College Football Hall of Fame

Randall Cornell McDaniel (born December 19, 1964) is an American former professional football player who was a guard in the National Football League (NFL), primarily with the Minnesota Vikings and two seasons with the Tampa Bay Buccaneers. He was inducted into the Pro Football Hall of Fame in 2009.

== Early life and college ==
McDaniel played high school football and ran track at Agua Fria High School in Avondale, Arizona, then played college football at Arizona State University, where he participated in the school's first ever Rose Bowl appearance in 1987. In recognition of his Rose Bowl accomplishments, McDaniel was inducted into the Rose Bowl Hall of Fame in 2018. He was joined by fellow Sun Devil Curley Culp on August 3, 2013, as the only Pro Football Hall of Fame members to be born in the state of Arizona.

== Professional career ==
Pre-draft measurables
Height	Weight	Hand span	40-yard dash	10-yard split	20-yard split	Vertical jump	Broad jump	Bench press
6 ft 3 3/4 in (1.92 m)	268 lb (122 kg)	10 in (0.25 m)	4.60 s	1.66 s	2.71 s	35.0 in (0.89 m)	9 ft 11 in (3.02 m)	17 reps

Also a standout track and field athlete, McDaniel still holds the fastest 100-meter dash time ever among offensive linemen in the NFL at 10.64 seconds, setting this record as a high school senior in a state meet, electronically timed. He recorded a PR of 50.04 seconds in the 400-meter dash. In the throwing events, he got top-throws of 16.76 meters in the shot put and 47.42 meters in the discus. He also benched 435, inclined 380, dead lifted 660, and squatted 650 in competition. In addition, he was timed at 4.6 seconds in the 40-yard dash and had a one step vertical leap of 37 inches at just 9% body fat.

He began his professional career being drafted by the Minnesota Vikings in the first round of the 1988 NFL draft. He started every Vikings regular-season game from 1990 to 1999, as well as a record 11 consecutive Pro Bowls. He is widely recognized as one of the greatest and most versatile offensive linemen ever to play the game. He started in 12 consecutive Pro Bowls (1989–2000), tied with Champ Bailey and Will Shields for the most Pro Bowls played. He also started 202 consecutive games in his career. During his time with the Minnesota Vikings, he occasionally would play fullback in short-yardage and goal-line situations.

He was released on February 10, 2000, as part of a salary-cap move. He eventually signed with the Tampa Bay Buccaneers on a three-year, $6M contract. He played two seasons there before retiring. On February 27, 2002, he signed a one-day contract to retire with Vikings. When he played for Tampa Bay, in 2000, he became the oldest player in the NFL to score his first touchdown reception at 36 years, 282 days old.

== Legacy ==
During the 2006 season, McDaniel was inducted into the Minnesota Vikings "Ring of Honor".

McDaniel was inducted into the National Football Foundation College Hall of Fame in 2008. McDaniel was also inducted into the Pro Football Hall of Fame on January 31, 2009. McDaniel's bust, sculpted by Scott Myers, was unveiled at the Enshrinement Ceremony on August 8, 2009. In 2011, McDaniel was inducted into the National High School Hall of Fame.

A multi-use sports center was built in Randall's hometown of Avondale in 2010 and was named in his honor (Randall McDaniel Sports Complex).

After 13 years of volunteering in schools, McDaniel said that he had been working in public schools since retirement.

== Personal life ==
McDaniel's nephews, Jarrod and Dakota Mermis, both played collegiate ice hockey for the University of Denver. While he was undrafted into the National Hockey League, Dakota plays for the Toronto Maple Leafs.
