= History of the Minnesota Vikings =

The Minnesota Vikings are an American football team based in Minneapolis, Minnesota. After initially committing to become one of the founding members of the American Football League (AFL) in 1959, the team joined the National Football League (NFL) as an expansion franchise and played their first game in 1961, as part of the Western Conference. In 1967, they were placed into the new Central division, which became part of the National Football Conference following the AFL–NFL merger in 1970. The divisions were reorganized again in 2002, with the Vikings as part of the NFC North, in which they have played ever since. The Vikings have won their division 20 times and appeared in the playoffs 30 times, leading to four conference championships (in 1969, 1973, 1974 and 1976) and one NFL title in 1969.

The team has had three home stadiums, all in the Minneapolis–Saint Paul metropolitan area: Metropolitan Stadium in Bloomington (1961–1981), and the Hubert H. Humphrey Metrodome (1981–2013) and U.S. Bank Stadium (2016–present) in Minneapolis itself; during the construction of U.S. Bank Stadium (2014–2015), they also played at the Minnesota Golden Gophers' Huntington Bank Stadium, also in Minneapolis.

== Origins ==
Professional football history in the Twin Cities began in the 1920s; the Minneapolis Marines joined the American Professional Football Association (later to become the National Football League) in 1921, but folded in 1924; they were resurrected as the Minneapolis Red Jackets in 1929 but lasted just two seasons before merging with the Frankford Yellow Jackets. A new professional team in the area did not surface again until August 1959, when three Minneapolis businessmen – Bill Boyer, H.P. Skoglund and Max Winter – were awarded a franchise in the new American Football League. Harry Gustafson is, in-part, credited with providing the "Vikings" name. Gustafson was part of an ownership group for a professional bowling team in the short-lived National Bowling League (NBL) in the early 1960s. Winter was also a part of that ownership group. In a narrative recounted by Winter and later confirmed by Gustafson, the two of them compiled a list of names for the bowling team, and Gustafson, an attorney, filed copyright for two names: "The Twin City Skippers" and the "Minnesota Vikings." The bowling team became the Skippers, but Gustafson retained the legal right to the "Vikings" name, which was used by Winter for the football team. Winter later credited Harry with giving him the name. Under the ownership of Max Winter, the franchise recognized Gustafson in 1989 during a pre-game ceremony at which the team presented Gustafson with a plaque for his "input in establishing the Viking name and the Viking tradition." Ole Haugsrud was added to the NFL team ownership because of an agreement he had with the NFL since the 1920s when he sold his Duluth Eskimos team back to the league. The agreement allowed him 10% of any future Minnesota team. The ownership group, along with Bernard H. Ridder, forfeited its AFL membership (which was subsequently passed onto the Oakland Raiders) and then were awarded the National Football League's 14th franchise on January 28, 1960, with play to begin in 1961.

== 1961–1966: Early years ==
Bill Boyer served as the team president from 1960 to 1964. Joe Thomas was hired as head scout. Minnesota's first management team was led by general manager Bert Rose, who was appointed as GM on August 5, 1960. In an article on August 6, 1960, in the Minneapolis Tribune, it was reported that the team would use the name "Minnesota" instead of "Minneapolis–Saint Paul". The article also stated that several nicknames were suggested for the team, including "Chippewas", "Miners", "Vikings" and "Voyageurs". The team was officially named the Minnesota Vikings on September 27, 1960; the name is partly meant to reflect Minnesota's place as a center of Scandinavian American culture. From the start, the Vikings embraced an energetic marketing program that produced a first-year season ticket sales of nearly 26,000 and an average home attendance of 34,586, about 85 percent of the 40,800-seat capacity of Metropolitan Stadium in Bloomington. Eventually, the stadium's capacity was increased to 47,900. On January 18, 1961, the Vikings named Norm Van Brocklin as head coach after Winnipeg Blue Bombers head coach Bud Grant turned down the job.

The Vikings' trademark horned helmet and purple-and-gold uniforms were designed by Los Angeles Examiner cartoonist Karl Hubenthal. Bert Rose and Norm Van Brocklin both knew Hubenthal from their days in Los Angeles—Rose having served as the Rams' public relations director, and Van Brocklin having played as their quarterback. Rose, an alumnus of the University of Washington, instructed Hubenthal to produce a uniform using the same colors as his alma mater. Hubenthal also composed the Vikings' original Norseman logo. The team has retained the basic elements of all those designs to the present day.

The Vikings played their first game, an exhibition game, against the Dallas Cowboys on August 5, 1961. The game was played at Howard Wood Field in Sioux Falls, South Dakota. The Vikings won their first regular-season game, defeating the Chicago Bears 37–13 on the opening day of 1961. Rookie Fran Tarkenton replaced starting quarterback George Shaw to throw four touchdown passes and run for another to lead the upset. The expansion team lost its next seven games on its way to a 3–11 record.

The team's second season in 1962 was the first, and to date, only season in franchise history in which the team failed to win at least three games. It is also the worst season ever by regular season winning percentage in Vikings' history.

Rose resigned from his position as GM on June 1, 1964. Jim Finks, then-general manager of the Calgary Stampeders, was named his successor on September 11, 1964. The Vikings had their first winning season in 1964, finishing with 8 wins, 5 losses and 1 tie. The 1964 season is also remembered by fans for a road game against the San Francisco 49ers in which defensive end Jim Marshall picked up a fumble and ran it to the wrong end zone. He thought he had scored a touchdown for the Vikings, but instead had scored a safety for the 49ers. The Vikings did go on to win the game, 27–22. 1964 was also the only season that the Vikings wore white jerseys at home games. This led to confusion when the Detroit Lions came to Bloomington with only their white jerseys. The game started with both teams wearing white jerseys. The Vikings retrieved their purple jerseys from Midway Stadium in Saint Paul. The Vikings changed from white jerseys to purple jerseys on the sidelines. That led to the Vikings wearing all-purple uniforms.

Max Winter became the team president in 1965. The Vikings played their first regular season night game and first regular season non Sunday game, when they played the New York Giants Saturday night October 9, 1965 at Met Stadium. In November of that year, the volatile Van Brocklin quit one day after the team had been eliminated from the postseason in a 41–21 defeat to the Baltimore Colts, but came back 24 hours later. Two months after that brief departure, Van Brocklin signed a new contract that would keep him with the franchise through 1970, but then quit for good, abruptly announcing his departure on February 11, 1967, saying he had lost control of the team, and the Vikings once again pursued the services of Bud Grant, who was still with Winnipeg. This time, Grant accepted the Vikings' offer and became the new Vikings head coach on March 11, 1967.

== 1967–1978: The Purple People Eaters era ==
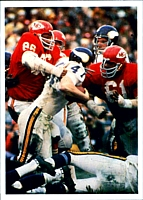
The Vikings playing against the Chiefs in Super Bowl IV.

On March 7, 1967, Fran Tarkenton was traded to the New York Giants for first- and second-round selections in the 1967 draft, a first-round selection in 1968, and a second-round selection in 1969. With these picks, Minnesota selected Clinton Jones and Bob Grim in 1967, Ron Yary in 1968, and Ed White in 1969.

During the late 1960s, the Vikings were building a powerful defense known as the Purple People Eaters, led by Alan Page, Carl Eller, Gary Larsen, and Jim Marshall. In 1968, that stingy defense earned the Vikings their first Central Division title and their first playoff berth. They lost to Baltimore 24–14 in the Western Conference championship game.

In 1969, the Vikings earned a 12–2 record, the best in the NFL. An opening-game one-point loss to the New York Giants, quarterbacked by former Viking Fran Tarkenton, was followed by 12 consecutive wins thanks to the leadership of Joe Kapp, who threw seven touchdown passes against the Baltimore Colts to tie an NFL record on their opening home game. The Vikings played their first regular-season game in Minneapolis, when the October 5 game against the Packers was moved to Memorial Stadium. That game also saw a then-record home crowd of 60,740. The Vikings defeated the Cleveland Browns 27–7 in the NFL Championship Game on January 4, 1970, at Metropolitan Stadium. Minnesota became the first modern NFL expansion team to win an NFL Championship Game, which earned the team a berth in Super Bowl IV. The heavily favored Vikings lost that game to the Kansas City Chiefs, 23–7, at Tulane Stadium in New Orleans.

The team continued to shine in 1970 and 1971 as their "Purple People Eater" defense led them back to the playoffs. In 1971, the defense was so impressive that Alan Page became the first-ever defensive player to win the NFL Most Valuable Player Award (MVP). The first post-merger game was a rematch with Kansas City, which the Vikings won 27–10. However, quarterback Joe Kapp had been traded away during the 1970 offseason, and his replacement, Gary Cuozzo, delivered some quite mediocre performances. Nonetheless, the defense carried the team to a 12–2 regular season record and the top of the newly created NFC Central division. They lost the divisional round of the playoffs to San Francisco, 17–14. Continued strong defense made up for Cuozzo's shortcomings as the Vikings won their division again in 1971 with an 11–3 record. The 1971 season saw the Vikings play their first regular season game on artificial turf, when they played Philadelphia at Veterans Stadium October 10. For the second year in a row, they lost the divisional round at home, this time to Dallas (the score being 20–12) in the first NFL game played on Christmas Day.

During this period, the issue of a new stadium began to surface. Metropolitan Stadium had originally been designed for baseball and was inadequate for an NFL team, seating 48,500 when the league now required a capacity of at least 50,000. Also, the stadium experienced harsh weather conditions late in the season. As the coldest venue in the NFL, it provided a considerable home field advantage to the Vikings, but was miserable for players, staff, and fans after October. However, no replacement was available for the time being.

On January 27, 1972, the Vikings decided to get Fran Tarkenton back. In exchange for him, they traded Norm Snead, Bob Grim, Vince Clements, and a first-round selection in 1972 and 1973 to the New York Giants. While the acquisitions of Tarkenton and wide receiver John Gilliam improved the passing attack, the running game was inconsistent, and the Vikings finished with a disappointing 7–7 record. The Vikings addressed the problem by drafting running back Chuck Foreman with their first pick in the 1973 draft. Co-owner Bill Boyer died on February 19, 1973 and was replaced on the team's board of directors by his son-in-law Jack Steele.

The Vikings won their first nine games of 1973 and finished the season with a 12–2 record. In the playoffs, they defeated the Washington Redskins 27–20 and the Dallas Cowboys 27–10. On January 13, 1974, the Vikings played the second Super Bowl in franchise history, Super Bowl VIII, against the Miami Dolphins at Rice Stadium in Houston, Texas. The Dolphins prevailed 24–7.

The Vikings won the Central Division again in 1974 with a 10–4 record. In the playoffs, they built on their cold weather reputation, defeating both the St. Louis Cardinals 30–14 and the Los Angeles Rams 14–10 in frozen Metropolitan Stadium. On January 12, 1975, The Vikings played in their second straight Super Bowl, Super Bowl IX (3rd overall), losing to the Pittsburgh Steelers, 16–6, at Tulane Stadium in New Orleans. In 1975, Mike Lynn, who had been hired the previous year as an assistant to Max Winter, was named general manager of the Vikings.

In 1975, the Vikings, led by MVP Tarkenton and Chuck Foreman, finished 12–2, losing only to Detroit and Washington while remaining undefeated until late in the season. However, the Vikings lost to the Dallas Cowboys in the playoffs, 17–14, on a controversial touchdown pass from Cowboys quarterback Roger Staubach to wide receiver Drew Pearson that became known as the Hail Mary. On the Vikings' next possession, Tarkenton was sacked just short of the end zone as he stepped back to pass, but the referees refused to penalize Dallas for pass interference. Afterwards, angry fans pelted the field with snowballs and one referee was struck in the head with a beer bottle, mimicking an incident two weeks earlier during the regular season finale in Buffalo where Foreman was hit in the eye with a snowball.

The Vikings finished 11–2–1 in 1976, winning their division once again and beating Washington at home, 35–20. They then won the NFC Championship in the last playoff game at Metropolitan Stadium over the Los Angeles Rams, 24–13, to advance to their third Super Bowl in four years. However, a championship continued to elude them when they lost to Oakland 32–14 at the Rose Bowl in Pasadena, California on January 9, 1977. Co-owner Ole Haugsrud died on March 13, 1976, and his widow, Margaret, took his place on the team's board of directors. In 1977, team attorney Sheldon Kaplan replaced Ridder on the board. Co-owner H. P. Skoglund died on November 5, 1977. In 1978, John Skoglund replaced his father on the team's board of directors, and general manager Mike Lynn replaced Margaret Haugsrud on the board.

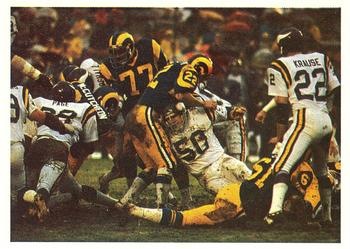
The Vikings' famed Purple People Eaters defensive line stopping a Rams rush in the 1977 NFC Divisional Playoff game.

In 1977, Minnesota again won the Central with a 9–5 record, but the team was showing signs of age. Fran Tarkenton had torn his ACL in the previous season's playoff game with the Redskins and lost the ability to perform his trademark scrambling. After years of beating the Rams in frozen Metropolitan Stadium, they finally had to go to Los Angeles for the divisional round due to receiving the #3 playoff seed and being denied home advantage. Instead of bright sunshine, there were heavy rains that turned the Los Angeles Memorial Coliseum into a mud bath, and the Vikings prevailed 14–7 on Monday December 26. On January 1, 1978, the Vikings played the Dallas Cowboys in their fourth NFC Championship Game in five years at Texas Stadium. Minnesota lost to the eventual Super Bowl champions, 23–6.

By 1978, age was taking its toll on the Vikings, but they still took advantage of a weak division to make the playoffs with an 8–7–1 record. The team had all but run out of gas as the Rams finally defeated them 34–10 in Los Angeles. Fran Tarkenton retired at the end of the season just short of his 39th birthday.

== 1979–1985: Ups and downs ==
With Tommy Kramer taking over as quarterback, the Vikings fell to a 7–9 record in 1979. After that season ended, defensive end Jim Marshall, the last link to the inaugural 1961 team, retired.

The Minnesota legislature approved a new stadium in 1979, and construction of the Hubert H. Humphrey Metrodome began in December 1979. A domed facility was chosen because of the harsh Minnesota winters and because it could be used for a much wider variety of activities than an outdoor facility.

In 1980, the Vikings won the NFC Central again with a 9–7 record, clinching the division title against the Cleveland Browns in the Miracle at the Met, but lost the divisional round in Philadelphia, 31–16. On May 15, 1981, the Vikings moved into a new facility in suburban Eden Prairie that houses the team's offices, locker room, and practice fields. The complex was named "Winter Park" after Max Winter, one of the Vikings' founders, who served as the team's president from 1965 to 1987. The Vikings played their first game at the Hubert H. Humphrey Metrodome in a preseason matchup against Seattle on August 21, 1982; Minnesota prevailed 7–3. The first touchdown in the new facility was scored by tight end Joe Senser on an 11-yard pass from Tommy Kramer. The first regular-season game in the Metrodome was the 1982 opener on September 12, when the Vikings defeated Tampa Bay 17–10. Running back Rickey Young scored the first regular season touchdown in the facility on a three-yard run in the second quarter. A players strike shortened the 1982 regular season to nine games, with the Vikings qualifying for the postseason with a 5–4 record. In the first round of the 16-team playoffs, the Vikings defeated the visiting Atlanta Falcons 30–24, but then lost at the Washington Redskins 21–7 in the second round.

The Vikings and St. Louis Cardinals played the first American football game in London's Wembley Stadium in a preseason game on August 6, 1983. The game was the dubbed the "Global Cup". The Vikings won 28–10. This was three years before the NFL started the American Bowl series. On January 27, 1984, Bud Grant retired as head coach of the Vikings. Over the past 17 seasons, Grant had led Minnesota to 12 playoff appearances, 11 division titles, and four Super Bowls. His regular-season record during those 17 years as 151–87–5 (.632).

Grant was replaced by Les Steckel, the Vikings' wide receivers coach for the past five seasons, on January 29, 1984. Steckel, who had come to the Vikings in 1979 after working as an assistant with the 49ers, was the youngest head coach in the NFL at age 38. His disciplinarian approach did not play well in the locker room; at one point the players were in open mutiny. The Vikings lost a franchise-worst 13 games and the defense allowed a total of 484 points, also a franchise-worst, in Steckel's only season as head coach. After the season, Steckel was fired, and on December 18, 1984, Grant was re-hired as the head coach of the Vikings.

== 1986–1991: Jerry Burns era ==
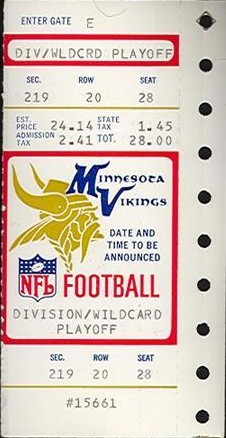
A ticket for the 1988 NFC Wildcard Game between the Vikings and the Rams.

On January 6, 1986, following the 1985 season, Grant re-retired, this time for good. At the time of his retirement, he was the sixth-winningest coach in NFL history with 168 career wins, including the playoffs. In 18 seasons, he led the Vikings to a 158–96–5 regular season record. Longtime Vikings assistant coach Jerry Burns was named the fourth head coach in team history on January 7, 1986. He served as the Vikings offensive coordinator from 1968 to 1985, when the team won 11 division titles and played in four Super Bowls. In his first season, the Vikings, led by the NFL Comeback Player of the Year Tommy Kramer, went 9–7, their first winning record in four years. In his second season, he led the Vikings to the NFC championship game.

Following the strike-shortened 1987 season, the 8–7 Vikings, who had finished 8–4 in regular games but 0–3 using replacement players, pulled two upsets in the playoffs by beating the two teams with the best regular season records. They beat the 12–3 New Orleans Saints 44–10 at the Louisiana Superdome in the Wild Card Playoff game. The following week, in the Divisional Playoffs, they beat the 13–2 San Francisco 49ers, 36–24 at Candlestick Park. During that game, Anthony Carter set the all-time record for most receiving yards in a playoff game with 227 yards. The Vikings played the Washington Redskins in the NFC Championship Game on January 17, 1988, at RFK Stadium. Trailing 17–10, the Vikings drove to the Redskins 6-yard line with a little over a minute left in the game but failed to get the ball into the end zone. Running back Darrin Nelson dropped a pass from Wade Wilson at the goal line to officially end the Vikings' hopes of a Super Bowl. Nelson was later traded to the Dallas Cowboys in possibly the worst trade in NFL history, the Herschel Walker deal. The Vikings and Chicago Bears played a preseason game at Ullevi Stadium in Gothenburg, Sweden on August 14, 1988. The Vikings won 28–21.

The Vikings' board of directors added four new members in 1988. Wheelock Whitney, Jr., Jaye Dyer, Irwin L. Jacobs and Carl Pohlad. They joined Max Winter, John Skoglund, Jack Steele, Sheldon Kaplan and Mike Lynn. Whitney became the new team president, replacing Winter. Winter left the board in 1989 and was replaced by Gerald Schwalbach.

On October 12, 1989, the Vikings acquired running back Herschel Walker from Dallas. The final result of the trade gave the Vikings Walker, third-round pick Mike Jones, fifth-round pick Reggie Thornton, and 10th-round pick Pat Newman in 1990, and third-round pick Jake Reed in 1991. Meanwhile, Dallas received Issiac Holt, David Howard, Darrin Nelson, Jesse Solomon, Alex Stewart, a first-, second- and sixth-round selection in 1990, a first- and second-round selection in 1991, and first-, second- and third-round selections in 1992. Two of those selections turned into Emmitt Smith and Darren Woodson. Walker's performance fell short of expectations in his three seasons with the Vikings, while the Cowboys rode their draft picks to three Super Bowl victories in the 1990s.

Roger Headrick became team president on January 1, 1991. He, along with Philip Maas, joined the board of directors replacing Jack Steele and Sheldon Kaplan. On December 3, 1991, Jerry Burns announced his retirement effective at the end of the 1991 season. In six seasons as head coach of the Vikings, Burns compiled a career record of 52–43 (.547). He also led Minnesota to three playoff appearances, including a division title and an NFC Championship game.

== 1992–2001: Dennis Green era ==
The ownership of the Vikings was restructured on December 16, 1991. Irwin Jacobs and Carl Pohlad sold their shares. The team was now owned by ten people: Roger Headrick (CEO and team president), John Skoglund (his family had owned part of the team since it was founded), Jaye Dyer, Philip Maas, Mike Lynn, Wheelock Whitney, James Binger, Bud Grossman, Elizabeth MacMillan and Carol Sperry. On January 10, 1992, Dennis Green was named the fifth head coach in team history. He came to Minnesota after turning around a struggling Stanford University football program as head coach from 1989 to 1991. In his 10 seasons as the coach of the Vikings, Green won four NFC Central division titles, had eight playoff appearances, two NFC Championship game appearances, and an all-time record of 97–62. Max Winter, one of the founders of the team, died on July 26, 1996.

The Vikings played two American Bowl preseason games overseas in the 1990s. On August 7, 1993, at Olympiastadion in Berlin, Germany, they defeated the Buffalo Bills 20–6. They also defeated the Kansas City Chiefs 17–9 at the Tokyo Dome on August 6, 1994.

=== 1998: 15–1: The year that could have been ===
Prior to the start of the 1998 season, the Vikings were sold to Red McCombs, a businessman from San Antonio, Texas. The NFL had not been happy with the Vikings' ownership arrangement of ten owners with none owning 30%. The ownership decided to sell the club. At first it appeared that author Tom Clancy was to become the new owner. However, his attempt to buy the team fell through, and in July 1998, the team was sold to McCombs.

1998 was a year to remember for the Minnesota Vikings. After losing starting quarterback Brad Johnson to a broken leg on a non-play (false start penalty), the Vikings went on to a spectacular offensive season led by Randall Cunningham, who had his best NFL season ever, running back Robert Smith, veteran wide receiver Cris Carter, and explosive rookie wide receiver Randy Moss. The Vikings set a then-NFL record by scoring a total of 556 points (a record since topped only four times, most recently the 2013 Denver Broncos, who scored 606), never scoring fewer than 24 in a game. The scoring total remained a record until 2007, when the New England Patriots scored 589. The Vikings finished the season 15–1, their only loss by 3 points to the Tampa Bay Buccaneers in Week 9. In the divisional playoffs, the Vikings rolled past the Arizona Cardinals 41–21 and came into the Metrodome heavily favored for their NFC Championship Game showdown with the Atlanta Falcons, who had finished 14–2. However, kicker Gary Anderson, who had gone 35 for 35 on field goal attempts in the regular season, missed a 38-yard attempt with just over two minutes remaining and the Vikings leading 27–20. The miss allowed the Falcons to drive downfield and tie the game. The Vikings had one more opportunity to score at the end of regulation, but head coach Dennis Green opted to down the ball and go to overtime (even though the Vikings had arguably the most potent offense in NFL history). The Falcons went on to win 30–27 in overtime on Morten Andersen's field goal, which was, coincidentally, also a 38-yarder. The Vikings became the first 15–1 team to fail to reach the Super Bowl.

=== 1999: Back to the playoffs ===
Randall Cunningham resumed quarterbacking duties again in 1999, but after a 2–4 start, Jeff George was given the starting job. He finished the season with an 8–2 record and led the Vikings into the postseason once again, with an overall team record of 10–6. The Vikings beat the Dallas Cowboys in the wild card game 27–10, and faced playoff newcomers Kurt Warner and the St. Louis Rams in the divisional playoffs. The game was a shootout which Minnesota led 17–14 at halftime, but the Rams outscored the Vikings 35–20 in the second half to win 49–37. St. Louis went on to win Super Bowl XXXIV.

=== 2000: Back to the NFC Championship ===
In 2000, led by first-year starting quarterback Daunte Culpepper (a 1999 first-round draft pick out of Central Florida), the Vikings had a season in which Robert Smith ran for a team record 1,521 yards with seven touchdowns. The Vikings were 11–2 after Week 14, but slumped briefly, losing their last three to the St. Louis Rams, Green Bay Packers and Indianapolis Colts while Culpepper was hampered by injury. They went on to make the playoffs for the fifth straight year and after easily beating the New Orleans Saints in the divisional game 34–16, the Vikings were humiliated 41–0 by the New York Giants in the NFC Championship Game In addition, Robert Smith retired at the end of the year, after playing only eight NFL seasons.

=== 2001: Tragedy and hope ===
Tragedy struck the Minnesota Vikings in the summer of 2001, when offensive tackle Korey Stringer died of heat stroke in training camp in Mankato, Minnesota. Even though Minnesota is known as a cold-weather state, in July and August it is known to be brutally hot.

The 2001 season started off with a 24–13 loss to the Carolina Panthers. This was the only win of the season for Carolina, who ended up 1–15. Over the next 16 weeks, wins for Minnesota were few and far between. Some season highlights included a 35–13 win over the rival Green Bay Packers in Week 6, and a Week 10 victory over the New York Giants in which Randy Moss pulled in 10 receptions for 171 yards and three touchdowns leading to a 28–16 victory. But despite having a 12th-ranked offense, their defense was in the bottom five, and the Vikings finished 5–11.

After the disappointing season, the Vikings bought out the contract of Dennis Green, who had become a polarizing force in the Viking fan base despite his successful coaching tenure with the team. Mike Tice coached the final game of 2001, losing to the Baltimore Ravens.

== 2002–2005: Mike Tice era ==
On January 10, 2002, Mike Tice, a former Vikings tight end, was named the sixth head coach in team history. Tice was the third of the six Vikings head coaches to be promoted from within the team's coaching ranks but was the first to have actually played for the Vikings.

In Tice's first season, the Vikings had a dismal 6–10 record, which he turned around in 2003 with a fast 6–0 start. However, the Vikings struggled in their next nine games going 3–6, and needed a win heading into the Week 17 game against the 3–12 Arizona Cardinals to secure a playoff spot. On the last play of the game and facing a 4th down and 25, wide receiver Nathan Poole caught a 28-yard touchdown pass that gave the Cardinals an 18–17 win. The shocking defeat, coupled with a Green Bay win over Denver, led to the Packers winning the NFC North division at 10–6, while the Vikings were 9–7, joining the 1978 Washington Redskins as the only teams to start the season 6–0 and miss the playoffs (a feat since matched by the 2009 Denver Broncos). The following season the Cardinals hired Dennis Green as their head coach.

=== 2004: Playoffs and Culpepper's historic season ===
As in the 2003 season, the Vikings finished the season going 3–7 over the final 10 weeks after starting 5–1, the worst performance ever by an NFL playoff team over the last 10 games. Unlike 2003, however, they made the playoffs with an 8–8 record. Daunte Culpepper amassed MVP-like statistics, throwing for 4,717 passing yards (leading the NFL), 39 passing touchdowns (a Viking record), and 5,123 total yards (an NFL record). In the wild card matchup, the Vikings defeated the rival Green Bay Packers in their first ever playoff meeting, 31–17, becoming the second team in NFL history to have a .500 record (8–8) in the regular season and win a playoff game, a day after the first such team, the St. Louis Rams over the Seattle Seahawks. In the divisional round, the Vikings were defeated 27–14 by the eventual NFC champion Philadelphia Eagles, ending their season in a game noted for Viking penalties, turnovers, and other miscues.

=== 2005: New owners ===
Red McCombs sold the team to a group led by Zygi Wilf in May 2005. Wilf was originally going to be a limited partner to Reggie Fowler. However, Fowler was not able to purchase the team. Wilf then became the lead owner, and Fowler is one of a group of ownership partners.

Minnesota traded wide receiver Randy Moss to the Oakland Raiders for linebacker Napoleon Harris and the Raiders' first- and seventh-round picks of the 2005 NFL draft. With their first-round pick (#7 overall) the Vikings selected wide receiver Troy Williamson out of South Carolina. A common misconception is the Vikings freed a ton of salary cap space by trading Moss. The reality is they were already more than $30 million under the cap, and dangerously close to the NFL's salary floor. They actually had to absorb about $7–10 million just to trade Moss. But they still had around $20 million in cap space and signed five new defensive starters to shore up their previously 28th-ranked defense. The Vikings fan base wondered if this was the franchise's biggest blunder in team history or one of their greatest moves.

At first, the move looked like a blunder. The Vikings started off by losing their first two games to the Tampa Bay Buccaneers (24–13) and the Cincinnati Bengals (37–8). They won in Week 3 against the New Orleans Saints (33–16), but then they went on to lose their next two road games to the Atlanta Falcons (30–10) and the division rival Chicago Bears (28–3). The Vikings won at home against fellow division rival Green Bay 23–20 by winning the same way the Packers did last season, which was a last-second field goal. However, the Vikings had little to celebrate the next week; not only did they lose to the Carolina Panthers 38–13 on the road, but they also lost star quarterback Daunte Culpepper for the season with a knee injury. Culpepper had thrown twice as many interceptions as touchdowns up to that point. At this point, the Vikings were 2–5.

Taking Culpepper's place was Brad Johnson (Vikings from 1992 to 1998 and quarterback of the Super Bowl XXXVII champion Tampa Bay Buccaneers) and, upon taking over, led the Vikings to a six-game winning streak, including victories over the Detroit Lions at home (27–14), the New York Giants (24–21), the Green Bay Packers at Lambeau Field (20–17, once again on a last-second field goal), the Cleveland Browns (24–12), the Detroit Lions at Ford Field (21–16), and a 27–13 home victory over the St. Louis Rams. Johnson ended up with the lowest interception-to-attempt ratio in Vikings history and the third-best passer rating in the NFC. The winning streak ended with an 18–3 loss to the Pittsburgh Steelers, the eventual Super Bowl champions. Christmas Day 2005 will go down as a day Vikings fans would much rather forget. After having their chances of winning the NFC North extinguished when the Bears defeated the Packers earlier in the day, the Vikings were officially eliminated from NFC playoff contention with a 30–23 loss to the Baltimore Ravens. The Vikings won their last game of the 2005 season against the Bears, with a 34–10 victory. However, the Vikings fired head coach Mike Tice immediately following the game. They ended up with a 9–7 record and one win away from the playoffs.

== 2006–2010: Brad Childress era ==
Prior to the 2006 season, the Vikings hired Brad Childress as the 7th head coach in Vikings history. The Vikings started their season with two narrow victories. They edged the Washington Redskins in Washington by a field goal, 19–16, and beat the Carolina Panthers at home, 16–13, to earn Childress a place in the record books by starting 2–0 as the head coach of the Vikings. They lost their next two games, each by close margins, one to the Chicago Bears (16–19) and the other to the Buffalo Bills in Buffalo (12–17).

In week five of the season, the Vikings relied on points scored late in the game to win against the Detroit Lions. While down 17–3 going into the fourth quarter, the Vikings scored 23 unanswered points, including two defensive touchdowns, resulting in a final score of 26–17.

After a bye in week six, the Vikings won easily over the Seattle Seahawks in Seattle, 31–13. Chester Taylor scored the longest touchdown in Vikings history in the win, running 95 yards for the score. A four-week losing streak ensued. The first loss was to the New England Patriots on Monday Night Football. The Vikings had won their last four home games on Monday Night Football, but the Patriots ended the streak when they blew out the Vikings at home, 31–7. Minnesota's only score came off Mewelde Moore's 73-yard punt return for a touchdown. The following week saw a 9–3 loss to the San Francisco 49ers. The loss was especially crushing after a touchdown pass was called back because of a block in the back penalty against Travis Taylor. In week ten, the Vikings lost again as they were outscored 23–17 at home by their division rivals, the Green Bay Packers.

The following week, fans had anticipated a match up between the Vikings and their former quarterback, Daunte Culpepper, who was acquired by the Miami Dolphins in the offseason for a second-round draft pick, but Culpepper had been benched in favor of Joey Harrington three weeks earlier. The Vikings lost their fourth straight game to Miami, 24–20. The game was out of reach after Jason Taylor returned a 51-yard interception for a touchdown. The Vikings defense set a team record by limiting the Dolphins to −3 yards rushing on 14 carries in the loss. The losing streak finally ended with the Arizona Cardinals and former head coach Dennis Green in town. The Vikings pulled off a 31–26 win, capped by a Vikings interception in the end zone to end the game. The Cardinals took a 7–0 lead on the first play of the game with a kickoff return touchdown by J. J. Arrington. Following the win over Arizona, the Vikings played the Chicago Bears closely, until the Bears' special teams (a Devin Hester punt return touchdown) as well as their defense (an interception return touchdown) put the game out of reach; the Vikings lost 23–13. Tarvaris Jackson made his NFL debut, completing the first pass of his career and finishing the day having completed 3 of 4 passes for 35 yards, with one fumble.

In Week 14, the Vikings pulled off their second win in three weeks, beating the Detroit Lions, 30–20. The Vikings' top running back, Chester Taylor, was out with bruised ribs, but backup Artose Pinner had the game of his life against a team that cut him a mere three months ago. He gained 125 yards and had three touchdowns, leading the Vikings to victory. Once again, the Vikings run defense matched a team record set only three weeks earlier by holding the Lions to −3 yards on 10 carries. The Vikings forced six turnovers, and only had two themselves.

Two losses followed—one to the New York Jets (26–13) and another to the Green Bay Packers (9–7). The game against Green Bay marked Tarvaris Jackson's first NFL start, as well as the elimination of any playoff possibilities for the Vikings. The Vikings ended the season by getting blown out by the St. Louis Rams, 41–21. The game saw Tarvaris Jackson make his second career start. The Vikings' defense was attempting to set a new NFL record (since the NFL–AFL merger) of giving up the fewest rushing yards per game in one season. This attempt was thwarted by the Rams' rushing attack, led by Stephen Jackson's 142 yards, which accumulated 168 yards on the ground. The Vikings ended the season giving up an average of 61.6 rushing yards per game, which fell behind the record of 60.6 rushing yards per game held by the 2000 Baltimore Ravens. Their 6–10 record served to solidify a third-place finish in the NFC North, as well as the seventh overall draft pick in the 2007 NFL draft.

With the seventh worst record in the 2006 NFL season, the Vikings selected prized running back Adrian Peterson out of the University of Oklahoma, who led the Sooners to the 2007 Tostitos Fiesta Bowl. Peterson made his Vikings regular season debut on September 9, catching a 60-yard screen pass from Tarvaris Jackson that went into the end zone for a touchdown against the troubled Atlanta Falcons at the Metrodome. The Vikings stumbled out of the gate after that huge win over Atlanta, losing to Detroit at Ford Field 20–17 in overtime, the Kansas City Chiefs at Arrowhead Stadium 13–10, and Brett Favre and the Green Bay Packers 23–16 at home. That game between the Packers and Vikings is noteworthy in that quarterback Brett Favre threw touchdown pass #421 (to Greg Jennings), breaking Dan Marino's mark of 420.

After a three-game skid, the Vikings then stormed back by winning against fellow division rival Chicago Bears at Soldier Field 34–31, but then dropped their next two games against the powerful Dallas Cowboys (14–10) and Philadelphia Eagles (23–16). In Week 9, at home to the San Diego Chargers, Adrian Peterson set a new single-game rushing record with 296 yards, breaking Jamal Lewis' record set on September 14, 2003 (against the Cleveland Browns). Not only that, Chargers cornerback Antonio Cromartie returned Vikings kicker Ryan Longwell's 57-yard field goal attempt 109 and a half yards for a touchdown, setting an unbreakable record for the longest single play in NFL history. The Vikings then lost the next week against the Green Bay Packers at Lambeau Field 34–0, which marked the first time since 1991 that the Vikings had failed to score a point in a regular-season game. The Vikings then made a midseason playoff push by winning the next five games: the Daunte Culpepper-led Oakland Raiders at home (29–22), the New York Giants in the Meadowlands (41–17), the Detroit Lions at home (42–10), the San Francisco 49ers at Monster Park (27–7), and the Chicago Bears at home on Monday Night Football (20–13). However, the Vikings bid for a Wild Card playoff berth ended when they lost to the Washington Redskins 32–21 on NBC's "Sunday Night Football." The Vikings then dropped their final regular season game against the Denver Broncos at Invesco Field 22–19. However, unlike in 2004, the Vikings had an 8–8 record but did not make the playoffs. Adrian Peterson also won the NFL's Rookie of the Year award.

To replace departing free agent quarterbacks Kelly Holcomb and Brooks Bollinger, the Vikings signed veteran Gus Frerotte, a former Vikings backup from 2003 to 2004, and drafted USC quarterback John David Booty. To amp up the passing attack, the Vikings snatched veteran wide receiver Bernard Berrian away from the Chicago Bears. To stiffen up the defense as well, the Vikings signed former Kansas City Chiefs defensive end Jared Allen to a six-year, $72.4 million contract.

The Vikings stumbled out of the gate in the first two games of the season, losing to the Green Bay Packers (who were without Brett Favre, who had signed with the Jets, for the first time in 16 years) 24–19 at Lambeau Field on Monday Night Football and to Peyton Manning and the Indianapolis Colts 18–15 at the Vikings' home opener on September 14. However, in a move that drew a lot of praise from Vikings fans, coach Brad Childress benched starting quarterback Tarvaris Jackson and replaced him with Gus Frerotte. Frerotte got the Vikings their first win, defeating the Carolina Panthers 20–10 at home. During the game, cornerback Antoine Winfield sacked Panthers quarterback Jake Delhomme, forcing a fumble that Winfield returned 19 yards for a touchdown; Childress said after the game that he thought Winfield had a half-second left, at the time he picked up the football, before it would have been ruled a dead ball and hence an incomplete pass. However, the Vikings then lost to the undefeated Tennessee Titans at LP Field 30–17, and defeated the New Orleans Saints 30–27 on Frerotte's first start on MNF since 1997. The game featured heroics from Winfield yet again, returning a blocked field goal 59 yards for a touchdown. It was the first and longest in franchise history. The Vikings then defeated the Detroit Lions 12–10 thanks in part to Ryan Longwell's game-winning 26-yard field goal, but then lost to the Chicago Bears 48–41 at Soldier Field. The 89 combined total points in the game were the largest ever in the rivalry between the two teams since the Vikings joined the league in 1961.

Following their Week 8 bye, the Vikings easily defeated future Viking quarterback Sage Rosenfels and the Houston Texans 28–21, and finally beat the Green Bay Packers 28–27 at home in Week 10, Brad Childress' first win against the Packers in his tenure with the Vikings. After losing to the Tampa Bay Buccaneers at Raymond James Stadium (the host site of Super Bowl XLIII later in the season) 19–13, a four-week winning streak ensued. The Vikings beat the floundering Jacksonville Jaguars 30–12, the Chicago Bears 34–14 on Sunday Night Football, and the Daunte Culpepper-led Detroit Lions at Ford Field 20–16. However, Gus Frerotte was injured in the Lions game and was replaced by Tarvaris Jackson, who had been sitting out since the Week 2 loss to the Colts. The Vikings proceeded to a solid victory in the desert, defeating the Arizona Cardinals 35–14. Jackson had a career day, throwing four touchdown passes (to Berrian, wide receiver Sidney Rice, running back Chester Taylor and wide receiver Bobby Wade respectively). However, in Week 16 the Vikings lost to the Atlanta Falcons 24–17 due in no small favors to the Vikings' many turnovers (six). The Bears tied proceeded to tie the Vikings for the division lead when they beat the Green Bay Packers on Monday Night Football the next night. So, it came down to the wire when the Vikings hosted the NFC East champion New York Giants at home for the final game of the season. The Vikings refused to display the Bears–Texans score on the Metrodome scoreboard so that the players would not get distracted, and as such the Vikings won the game 20–19 thanks in large part to Ryan Longwell's game-winning 51-yard field goal. The win made the Vikings the NFC North champions for the 17th time and for the first time since 2000 (when it was called the NFC Central). But the ensuing playoff match with Philadelphia turned into a disaster when Brad Childress decided to pull Gus Frerotte and replace him as starting QB with Tarvaris Jackson despite frantic protests from the team. Jackson performed poorly and the Eagles won it 26–14.

After his March 2008 retirement from Green Bay, Brett Favre decided to return to action that summer and was traded to the New York Jets by his former team. The trade included a clause that would have forced the Jets to forfeit all of their 2009 draft picks to the Packers if they tried to trade him to Minnesota. Following a 2008 season in which the Jets did not reach the playoffs with a 9–7 record, Favre retired a second time. During the spring of 2009, rumors began swirling of Favre signing with the Vikings, something Green Bay had not permitted him to do the previous year and which prompted the trade to the Jets. However, he was already engaged in secret negotiations with the Vikings, which were made public in the summer. On August 17, he signed a two-year deal with the team and instantly provoked the outrage of Packers fans, former players (including former Viking quarterback Fran Tarkenton) and other critics. The season nonetheless began well. Favre's first game as a Viking was a 34–20 victory over Cleveland. On Monday, October 5, he faced his former Green Bay teammates in the Metrodome and beat them 30–23. The Vikings then defeated the Rams and Ravens before losing their first game of the season in Pittsburgh. After that, they traveled to Lambeau Field where Favre had to endure continuous boos and heckling throughout the game. The Packers fell a second time, the score being 38–26. After the bye week came three wins at home over weak opponents, after which the Vikings faced the Cardinals in Arizona and lost 30–17 in a contest where linebacker E. J. Henderson broke his leg and was taken out of commission for the rest of the season. The Vikings dropped two of the next three games, including an overtime loss to Chicago in freezing weather. The last game of the regular season saw them sweep a Giants team that had recently been eliminated from playoff contention. As a result, Minnesota won the NFC North for the second year in a row, the first time in 31 years the franchise had logged back-to-back division titles, and secured the No. 2 playoff seed with the Cowboys' win over Philadelphia later in the day. In the divisional round, they routed the Cowboys 34–3 with little difficulty, but in the Conference Championship had to face a 13–3 Saints team. In a long, difficult game in which Favre was hit multiple times (though never sacked) by a New Orleans defense that forced six fumbles, recovering three, the Vikings fought to a standstill.

Despite the mistakes and crushing hits to Favre (who suffered a painful ankle injury), the Vikings drove to the Saints' 33-yard-line with seconds remaining in regulation. However, after Minnesota called a time out, they were penalized for allowing 12 men in the huddle. On the next play, Favre threw across the middle and was intercepted by New Orleans cornerback Tracey Porter, ending the potential game-winning field goal attempt with seven seconds left in regulation. In overtime, New Orleans won the coin toss and drove down field and kicked a 38-yard field goal, bringing the final score to 31–28 and sending them to the Super Bowl.

The Vikings had an unremarkable draft in 2010, and Brett Favre remained uncertain as to whether he would come back for the second year of his contract. To add to the uncertainty, his daughter Brittney gave birth, making him the first active player in the NFL to be a grandfather. To convince him, Childress secretly sent three of his players down to Hattiesburg. Reporters were curious as to why three of the Vikings' stars were missing from training camp, but Childress was mum on their location. He finally announced his return on August 17, saying that there was unfinished business. To sweeten his deal, Favre's salary was increased from $13 million to $16 million with performance guarantees. This announcement of his return was just in time for the second preseason game in San Francisco. However, the Vikings found themselves with a badly thinned receiving corps due to Sidney Rice suffering from an injury sustained in the game with New Orleans and Percy Harvin having severe migraine headaches. The team also traded Sage Rosenfels to the Giants. The regular season got off to an unpromising start when Minnesota lost its first game in New Orleans, but this much-hyped rematch of the NFC Championship resulted in a score of only 14–9. In Week 2, the Vikings fell at home to Miami for the first time since 1979 (with the score being 14–10). Favre threw four interceptions in the two games, although that was in part because of the team's inadequate receiver corps. They did manage to win in Week 3 against the Lions, but mostly due to the efforts of Adrian Peterson, who ran for an 80-yard touchdown in the third quarter. With the Vikings' passing game still in disarray, Favre threw one touchdown pass and two interceptions. During the bye week, the team tried to fix their offensive woes by getting wide receiver Randy Moss back from New England in exchange for a third-round draft pick. They next headed for a Monday Night Football match with the Jets. After being shut out in the first half, Minnesota rallied as Favre threw three touchdown passes. However, with two minutes remaining, he threw an interception that was returned for a touchdown. Another scoring drive failed when the Vikings ran out of time and they lost 28–20. Minnesota was able to eke out a 24–21 win over the penalty-ridden Cowboys in Week 6. Next, the team returned to Green Bay where Favre was again booed. However, there was no miraculous victory this time as he threw three interceptions (one returned for a touchdown), and three Vikings touchdowns were overturned by the referees, giving Green Bay a 28–23 win. Brad Childress was fined $35,000 by the NFL for criticizing the officiating afterwards. Then the Vikings traveled to New England where both Favre and Moss were booed by Patriots fans. During the third quarter, Favre was hit in the chin and taken off the field bleeding, where it was determined that he suffered a skin laceration. Tarvaris Jackson took over and threw a three-yard touchdown pass and two-point conversion, pulling the Vikings to within 3 points at 21–18. However, a second Patriots touchdown ended the game at 28–18.

Afterwards, Randy Moss strongly criticized the Vikings front office, describing it as being incompetent. He was then cut from the roster, ending a three-week return to his former team. Two days later, Tennessee signed Moss after 20 other teams turned him down. Meanwhile, the Vikings headed back home to host Arizona, prevailing in a 27–24 overtime win. Brett Favre surprised everyone by passing for 446 yards (a career-high), 36 passes (also a career-high) and two touchdowns. The win also was good luck for Brad Childress, who had been coming under increased criticism for his coaching ability. However, the next game against Chicago was a 27–13 loss as the Vikings' inability to win on the road continued, virtually excluding them from playoff contention. After his impressive Week 10 performance, Brett Favre's numbers shrank back to one touchdown, three interceptions, and only 170 yards. The next week, the Vikings hosted the Packers in Week 12 with their playoff hopes riding on the game. The Vikings got off to a quick start shutting down Green Bay's offense and leading 3–0 at the end of the first quarter. However, the game turned in favor of the Packers when Favre threw an interception in the second quarter and went on to lose 31–3. This final disaster sealed Childress's fate, and he was fired the next day, November 22. Defensive coordinator Leslie Frazier was named interim head coach. Things got off to a decent start under the new coach when the Vikings won 17–13 in Washington, breaking their road losing streak. Brett Favre made a surprise 10-yard run to pick up the game-winning first down. Afterwards, the team returned home to face Buffalo in Week 13. On the first play of the game, Favre was knocked out with a shoulder injury. Tarvaris Jackson took over and led Minnesota to a 38–14 victory despite throwing three interceptions. Meanwhile, Favre was diagnosed with a sprained shoulder. He nonetheless expressed his willingness to play the Giants in Week 14 for his 298th consecutive start.

However, fate took a bizarre turn when the Midwestern United States was blasted with a snowstorm on the weekend of December 11–12. The Giants could not reach Minnesota in time, forcing the game to be moved to Monday night. Then on Sunday, the Metrodome's inflatable roof collapsed under the weight of 10 feet of snow. After considering several alternate sites, the NFL settled on Detroit's Ford Field for the game.

Speculation as to whether Brett Favre would play came to a surprise end when he announced that, due to numbness in his throwing hand, he was going to sit out, ending his consecutive start record at 297 games. For the first time since September 1992, Favre stepped onto the field with a clipboard in hand and no uniform on as Tarvaris Jackson took over. However, he was not able to accomplish much as the Giants routed Minnesota 21–3, completely removing them from playoff contention.

Meanwhile, it was announced that the Metrodome's roof could not be fixed in time for the upcoming Monday Night game with Chicago. Thus, the NFL made the controversial decision to hold the game at the University of Minnesota's TCF Bank Stadium, an outdoor facility that would subject players and fans to Minnesota's harsh winter weather, and making for the Vikings' first open-air home game since December 1981. Attempting to remedy their poor quarterback situation, the team signed veteran free agent Patrick Ramsey. Meanwhile, Tarvaris Jackson was placed on injured reserve due to a toe injury sustained in the Giants game. Favre remained on the bench as Joe Webb was chosen to start in the Bears game. But on the eve of the game, Favre announced his willingness to play and proceeded to take the field. After only a few minutes, he was taken away after being knocked into the frozen ground and concussed. The Bears easily won the game 40–17. Despite dire predictions, Joe Webb managed to lead Minnesota past the playoff-bound Eagles in Week 16, but they lost the final game in Detroit to close 2010 at 6–10 and a last place finish in the NFC North for the first time since 1990.

== 2011–2013: Leslie Frazier era ==
With Favre's retirement and Tarvaris Jackson's departures at the end of the season, Joe Webb was widely expected to take over as the starting quarterback. However, the Vikings front office reportedly did not believe he was suitable for the position and the team instead drafted Florida State quarterback Christian Ponder with the 12th overall pick in the 2011 draft.

Aside from drafting Ponder, the Vikings also had to deal with a highly unpopular league lockout that lasted from March to July. As soon as it ended, unrestricted free agents Tarvaris Jackson and Sidney Rice both found new homes in Seattle. Most importantly, the team acquired veteran quarterback Donovan McNabb from Washington with the intention of him starting until either Ponder or Webb were deemed ready enough.

The Vikings had a disastrous start to 2011 when they lost in San Diego 24–17. McNabb threw for a meager 39 yards and only one pass greater than 10 yards. A 103-yard Percy Harvin kick return was the highlight of the game. In Week 2, the Buccaneers beat Minnesota 24–20 and their fortunes continued to slide in Week 3 as Detroit rallied from a 20–0 deficit to win in overtime 23–20 and end a nine-game losing streak against the Vikings, who now got off to their first 0–3 start since 1967. Minnesota headed to Kansas City in Week 4 hoping for a victory over the winless Chiefs, but the game was another loss at 22–17, and the Vikings now began 0–4 for the first time since 1962 (the franchise's second year of existence). After finally beating Arizona in Week 5, Minnesota's season continued to unravel after an overwhelming defeat in Chicago. Donovan McNabb was benched and Christian Ponder took over as starting quarterback. The Vikings only won two more games during the rest of the season; against the Panthers and Redskins for a 3–13 finish. McNabb meanwhile was cut from the roster in Week 12. During the Redskins game, Adrian Peterson sustained a severe ACL tear and Ponder a head injury. With Joe Webb starting, the Vikings ended an abysmal season by losing at home to Chicago.

The off-season saw Minnesota clean out a number of veteran players such as Jim Kleinsasser (who retired after 10 seasons), Ryan Longwell and Cedric Griffin. They brought in offensive tackle Matt Kalil from USC with the No. 4 pick in the 2012 NFL draft.

2012 began on a positive note with a 26–23 overtime win at home over the Jaguars. In Week 2, the Vikings traveled to Indianapolis, but solid offensive performance was negated by poor clock management and a series of personal fouls in the fourth quarter, costing them the game. Returning home for Week 3, Minnesota faced 2–0 San Francisco, which had soundly beaten Detroit and Green Bay, and was being touted as the best team in the conference. The Vikings' two-pronged offense (Percy Harvin and Adrian Peterson) proved effective at overstretching the 49ers defense and they rode to victory 24–13. Christian Ponder continued to show progress as a quarterback and Minnesota preserved its 20-year-long home win streak against San Francisco. In Week 17, the Vikings faced the Green Bay Packers, who had already clinched the division. The Vikings won 37–34 in a game in which running back Adrian Peterson ran for 199 yards, finishing the season just nine yards short of the league's all-time single-season rushing record of 2,105 yards, set by Los Angeles Rams running back Eric Dickerson in 1984.

The Vikings made the playoffs for the 27th time in franchise history, their first trip since the Brett Favre era, clinching their first Wild Card berth of the decade, but fell to the Green Bay Packers 24–10.

In the 2013 season, the Vikings ended up 5–10–1 with no road wins. In week 4, they played host to the Steelers in the International Series game in London, beating them 34–27, and in week 12 they played out a 26–26 tie with the Packers at Lambeau Field. The Vikings had obvious flaws on both offense and defense. The offense suffered from inefficiency and uncertainty at the quarterback position and a carousel of signal callers between Ponder and acquired free agents Matt Cassel and Josh Freeman. Cassel outplayed a regressing Ponder and eventually earn the starting job late in the season. The defense allowed a league-worst 480 points, coming within four points of matching the franchise-worst set in 1984. The Vikings lost four games by allowing the opposition to make game-winning scores in the final minutes of the game. Some Vikings players also suffered injury, notably Adrian Peterson and Kyle Rudolph. In spite of these problems, the Vikings managed to win four straight home games, including their season finale against the Lions. Despite the Vikings finishing better than how they started, Coach Frazier was fired on December 30, 2013, the day after the season ended. This was the last season the Vikings played at the Metrodome before it was demolished to make way for U.S. Bank Stadium.

== 2014–2021: Mike Zimmer era ==
After the disastrous end of the 2013 season, head coach Leslie Frazier was fired and the team began their search for the ninth head coach in team history. Among the candidates they interviewed were Cincinnati Bengals offensive coordinator Jay Gruden (who ended up as the head coach of the Washington Redskins), former Vikings (and Seattle Seahawks) offensive coordinator Darell Bevell, and Cincinnati Bengals defensive coordinator Mike Zimmer. After several weeks, Zimmer was named the ninth head coach in Vikings history on January 15, 2014. Coordinators Bill Musgrave and Alan Williams were replaced by former Cleveland Browns offensive coordinator Norv Turner and former Miami Dolphins linebacker coach George Edwards, respectively. Zimmer had been a coordinator and assistant coach within the NFL for two decades, but this was his first head coaching job in the NFL. With Josh Freeman's departure, Matt Cassel was widely expected to start the season at QB, with former first-round pick Christian Ponder as his backup. However, many in the Minnesota sports media felt that Ponder no longer was a part of the Vikings overall plans. The team drafted UCLA linebacker Anthony Barr with the 9th overall pick, and also drafted Louisville quarterback Teddy Bridgewater with the last pick in the first round of the 2014 NFL Draft, trading a 2nd- and 4th-round pick to the Seattle Seahawks for the 32nd pick. The team was reportedly ready to draft polarizing Texas A&M quarterback Johnny Manziel, but the Cleveland Browns ended up drafting him 22nd overall. Bridgewater later got the starting job at the quarterback position when Cassel went out with a season-ending foot injury. Though the Vikings struggled offensively and once again got eliminated from playoff contention, Bridgewater showed signs of being a potential franchise quarterback, and the Vikings' defense had also improved from last season, to offset the struggles. The Vikings improved on their five-win 2013 season with an overtime win over the New York Jets, who the Vikings hadn't beaten since 1975. That game saw wide receiver Jarius Wright turn a screen pass from Bridgewater into an 87-yard touchdown. A 13–9 win over the Bears in the season finale helped the Vikings avoid being swept by the division, and ended up with a 7–9 record.

Star running back Adrian Peterson was indicted by a grand jury in Montgomery County, Texas, being charged with reckless or negligent injury to a child. The Vikings deactivated Peterson for their next game against the New England Patriots. The Vikings announced that Peterson would play against the New Orleans Saints, but subsequently reversed the decision amid fan backlash and sponsor withdrawals. The Vikings then placed Peterson on the Commissioner's exempt list, requiring him to remain away from team activities while he settles his legal situation. Peterson later agreed to a plea deal in court and attempted to be reinstated, but the NFL suspended him without pay for the rest of the season and denied his appeal. Peterson rejoined the team for the 2015 season, starting against the San Francisco 49ers. The Vikings went 11–5 during the regular season and won the NFC North, setting up a Wild Card playoff clash against the Seattle Seahawks. With the Vikings trailing the Seahawks 10–9 with 26 seconds left, they had a chance to win with a 27-yard field goal; however, Blair Walsh missed wide left and the Vikings' season was over.

In 2016, after Bridgewater suffered a season-ending knee injury in preseason, the Vikings traded for Eagles quarterback Sam Bradford, giving up their first-round pick in the 2017 NFL draft. The Vikings started out 5–0 prior to their bye week, but lost their next four and ultimately won just three more games on the season, finishing with an 8–8 record and missing the playoffs. Adrian Peterson left the team as a free agent in the off-season, and the team drafted Florida State running back Dalvin Cook to replace him. In 2017, Bradford was injured prior to the Vikings' Week 2 game against the Pittsburgh Steelers, leading to backup quarterback Case Keenum taking over for the remainder of the season. They posted a 13–3 record to win Zimmer's second NFC North title in three seasons, and earn the NFC's #2 seed. In the divisional round, the Vikings scored the first 17 points of the game against the New Orleans Saints, but the Saints made a fourth-quarter comeback to lead 24–23 with 25 seconds left. With the Vikings on their own 39-yard line, Keenum threw to Stefon Diggs near the sideline; Saints safety Marcus Williams missed his attempted tackle, allowing Diggs to stay inbounds and run unchallenged into the endzone for the game-winning touchdown as time expired on a play that was later dubbed the Minneapolis Miracle. In the NFC Championship Game against the Philadelphia Eagles, the Vikings scored the first touchdown of the game, but the Eagles scored 38 unanswered points to advance to Super Bowl LII.

In the offseason, Keenum left as a free agent and the Vikings signed quarterback Kirk Cousins. With Cousins under center, the Vikings managed an 8–7–1 record in 2018, though Adam Thielen posted multiple NFL receiving records throughout the season, including recording eight consecutive 100+ yard receiving games. In Cousins' second season with the Vikings, they started 2–2 but won six of their next seven games before their bye week. They then won just two of their final five games to finish 10–6 and earn the sixth seed in the playoffs. In the wild card round, the Vikings faced the Saints in the Superdome and took a 20–10 lead by the end of the third quarter, though the Saints came back in the fourth to tie the game at 20–20. The Vikings received the ball in overtime and went 75 yards in 9 plays, culminating with a touchdown catch from Kyle Rudolph in the back of the end zone. The following week, the Vikings lost 27–10 to the #1 seed San Francisco 49ers.

Ahead of the 2020 season, the Vikings traded Stefon Diggs to the Buffalo Bills in exchange for the 22nd overall pick in the 2020 NFL draft; they used that pick to draft Diggs' replacement, LSU wide receiver Justin Jefferson. The Vikings started the 2020 season at 1–5 prior to their bye week, before a 5–1 run after the bye got them back to 6–6; however, three defeats in their last four games, including a 52–33 loss to the Saints in which Alvin Kamara rushed for a league record six touchdowns, meant they were eliminated from playoff contention despite a final-day win over the Lions. Jefferson picked up 133 receiving yards in that game to finish with 1,400 yards on the season, setting a new league record for receiving yards by a rookie.

The Vikings began the 2021 season with a 1–3 record in their first four games, but returned to .500 with two straight wins going into their bye week. After the bye, the Vikings alternated between losing two in a row and winning two in a row for their next 10 games, though only the final defeat, a 37–10 loss to the Green Bay Packers at Lambeau Field, was by more than 8 points. That loss eliminated the Vikings from playoff contention for the second season in a row, the first time they had missed the postseason two years in a row under Mike Zimmer. Despite a final-day victory over the Bears, Zimmer was fired the next day, ending his eight-year tenure with the Vikings. He was replaced in February 2022 by former Rams offensive coordinator Kevin O'Connell. The Vikings also fired general manager Rick Spielman.

== 2022–present: Kevin O'Connell era ==
Under Kevin O'Connell and new general manager Kwesi Adofo-Mensah, the Vikings started 8–1, the first time since 2009. They improved on their 8–9 record from the previous year and gained a 13–4 record, clinching the NFC North for the first time since 2017. Despite the record, they had a negative point differential (-3), the first time this had been done by a team with 12 wins in NFL history.

In Week 15, while playing against the Indianapolis Colts, the Vikings were initially projected to lose, as they were trailing 0–33. However, the Vikings were able to pull off the biggest comeback in NFL history, tying the game 36–36 to head into overtime. Kicker Greg Joseph would make a 40-yard field goal to secure the record-breaking win for the Vikings.

With their 13–4 record, the Vikings reached the Wild Card with the 3rd seed in the NFC, and faced the New York Giants. Despite the game being projected in the Vikings' favor, the Vikings would lose to the Giants 24–31. The game would be set in stone when the Giants' defense swarmed T. J. Hockenson at midfield after a 3-yard catch to force a turnover on downs with only 1:44 to go in the final quarter, and no Vikings timeouts remaining.

The 2023 season would be a disaster for the Vikings. They started 0–3 for the second time in the past four seasons. They failed to improve upon their 13–4 record from 2022 after a Week 5 loss to the eventual back to back Super Bowl champion Kansas City Chiefs and match that record with a Week 11 loss to the Denver Broncos. However, after having a 1–4 record, the Vikings would win 5 games straight, going to a 6–4 record. During Minnesota's Week 8 game against their division rival, the Green Bay Packers, starting quarterback Kirk Cousins ruptured his achilles tendon, ruling him out for the rest of the season. They went through a quarterback carousel for the rest of the season, going 1–6 in their last 7 games including 4 straight losses to end the season. In Week 16, they were knocked out of division contention following a loss to the Detroit Lions, and in Week 18, they were eliminated from playoff contention after losing to the Lions again.

2024 would be a great improvement from their last season as they acquired quarterback Sam Darnold from the 49ers. They started at 5–0 for the first time since 2016 and after their loss to the Rams in week 8, they would go on to a 9-game winning streak as they would earn 14 wins in a season for the first time since 1998. However, despite their impressive record, it was not enough to win the NFC North as they would go on to lose to the Detroit Lions in Week 18, to finish at 14–3 and earn the #5 seed of the playoffs, also becoming the first team in NFL History to finish a season with 14 wins as a Wild Card. To make things even worse, they would go on to lose once again to the Rams 27–9 in the Wild Card round, ending their season.
