= Super Bowl XI =

1977 Edition of the Super Bowl

Oakland Raiders (1) (AFC) (13–1)	Minnesota Vikings (1) (NFC) (11–2–1)
32	14
Head coach: John Madden	Head coach: Bud Grant
	1	2	3	4	Total
OAK	0	16	3	13	32
MIN	0	0	7	7	14
- Date: January 9, 1977
- Kickoff time: 12:47 p.m. PST (UTC-8)
- Stadium: Rose Bowl; Pasadena, California
- MVP: Fred Biletnikoff, wide receiver
- Favorite: Raiders by 4
- Referee: Jim Tunney
- Attendance: 103,438

Ceremonies
- National anthem: None (Vikki Carr sang "America the Beautiful")
- Coin toss: Jim Tunney
- Halftime show: Disney presents "It's A Small World" with the Los Angeles Unified All-City Band

TV in the United States
- Network: NBC
- Announcers: Curt Gowdy and Don Meredith
- Nielsen ratings: 44.4 (est. 62 million viewers)
- Market share: 73
- Cost of 30-second commercial: $125,000

Radio in the United States
- Network: NBC Radio
- Announcers: Jim Simpson and John Brodie

Super Bowl XI was an American football game between the American Football Conference (AFC) champion Oakland Raiders and the National Football Conference (NFC) champion Minnesota Vikings to decide the National Football League (NFL) champion for its 1976 season. The Raiders defeated the Vikings by the score of 32–14 to win their first Super Bowl. The game was played on January 9, 1977, at the Rose Bowl in Pasadena, California. This remains the earliest scheduled calendar date for a Super Bowl; and the most recent Super Bowl to begin before 4:00 P.M. ET.

This was the Raiders' second Super Bowl appearance after losing Super Bowl II. They posted a 13–1 regular season record before defeating the New England Patriots and the Pittsburgh Steelers in the playoffs. The Vikings and their Purple People Eaters defense were making their fourth Super Bowl appearance after posting an 11–2–1 regular season record and playoff victories over the Washington Redskins and the Los Angeles Rams. The Vikings became the first team to lose four Super Bowls, a record they held until the Denver Broncos lost their fifth Super Bowl to the Seattle Seahawks in Super Bowl XLVIII. The Vikings had not won in their previous three attempts, losing Super Bowl IV to the Kansas City Chiefs in the final Super Bowl before the AFL–NFL merger, and followed with losses in Super Bowls VIII and IX to the Miami Dolphins and Pittsburgh Steelers, respectively.

Super Bowl XI was dominated by the Raiders. Oakland gained a Super Bowl record 429 yards, including a Super Bowl record 288 yards in the first half, en route to winning Super Bowl XI. After a scoreless first quarter, Oakland scored on three consecutive possessions to take a 16–0 lead at halftime. The Raiders also had two fourth quarter interceptions, including cornerback Willie Brown's 75-yard return for a touchdown. Oakland wide receiver Fred Biletnikoff, who had 4 catches for 79 yards which set up three Raider touchdowns, was named the game's Most Valuable Player (MVP). Among the wide receivers who have won the Super Bowl MVP, Biletnikoff was the only one to not have gained 100 yards in his performance until Cooper Kupp in Super Bowl LVI. This was the first Super Bowl since Super Bowl V in which neither team had appeared in the previous Super Bowl.

== Background ==
=== Host selection process ===
The NFL awarded Super Bowl XI to Pasadena, California on March 19, 1975, at the owners' meetings held in Honolulu. After awarding two consecutive Super Bowl host sites during both the 1972 and 1973 owners' meetings, respectively, the league went back to awarding only one host site at this meeting. However, the winner was still provided with nearly two years of preparation time. A total of six cities submitted bids: Pasadena (Rose Bowl), Los Angeles (Coliseum), Dallas, Houston, New Orleans, and Montreal. Pasadena won on the sixth ballot, with the stadium's capacity (104,701) the leading factor.

The selection of Pasadena was mildly controversial. For the first time, the Super Bowl would be played in a stadium which never housed an NFL franchise. The city of Pasadena entered the bidding last-minute, in an effort to address rising maintenance costs of the stadium. At the time, the Rose Bowl had no permanent major football tenant (UCLA did not move in until 1982) outside of single neutral site games such as the Rose Bowl Game and Pasadena Bowl. Super Bowl XI would take place only eight days after the 1977 Rose Bowl on the same field. Stadium officials expressed confidence the turf would be in good condition. Pac-8 executive director Wiles Hallock, along with some individual members of the Tournament of Roses Committee opposed the city's bid. However, former Pasadena mayor Don Yokaitis, who made the presentation, successfully touted the stadium's prestige, tradition, and capacity. It would be the first of five Super Bowls played at the Rose Bowl.

=== Oakland Raiders ===
This game marked the second Super Bowl appearance for the Oakland Raiders, who lost Super Bowl II. Two years after their Super Bowl loss, former head coach John Rauch left for Buffalo and the Raiders made Rauch's assistant, linebackers coach John Madden a first time head coach. In Madden's first 8 seasons the Raiders had posted an 83–22–7 record (for a .772 winning percentage counting ties, second only to the Vikings' .781 in the NFL). Super Bowl XI was Oakland's first NFL championship, culminating seven playoff appearances since 1968, including six losses in the AFL/AFC Championship Game. With the exception of the 1972 Steelers, all of the Raiders' opponents would end up winning the Super Bowl.

The Raiders offense was led by quarterback Ken Stabler, who finished as the top rated passer in the AFC, passing for 2,737 yards, 27 touchdowns, and 17 interceptions. His 66.7 completion percentage (194 completions out of 291 attempts) was the second highest in the league. Stabler's main passing weapon was wide receiver Cliff Branch, who caught 46 passes for 1,111 yards (24.2 yards per catch average) and 12 touchdowns. Fred Biletnikoff was also a reliable deep threat, with 43 receptions for 551 yards and 7 touchdowns, while tight end Dave Casper recorded 53 receptions for 691 yards and 10 touchdowns.

In addition to their great passing attack the Raiders also had a powerful running game, led by fullback Mark van Eeghen (1,012 rushing yards, 17 receptions) and halfback Clarence Davis (516 rushing yards, 27 receptions). Another reason for the Raiders' success on offense was their offensive line, led by left tackle Art Shell and left guard Gene Upshaw.

Injuries early in the season forced the Raiders to switch from a 4–3 to a 3–4 defense. The switch benefited the team, as they won their last 10 games and finished the regular season with the best record in the league, 13–1. The Raiders' defense was anchored by great linebackers, such as Phil Villapiano and Ted Hendricks, while defensive end Otis Sistrunk anchored the defensive line. Their defensive secondary was extremely hard-hitting and talented, led by safeties Jack Tatum and George Atkinson, and cornerbacks Skip Thomas and Willie Brown.

Brown, Upshaw, Biletnikoff and running back Pete Banaszak were the only holdovers from the Oakland team which was defeated nine years earlier in Super Bowl II.

Many accused the Raiders defense of being overly aggressive, especially Atkinson, who inflicted a severe concussion on Pittsburgh Steelers wide receiver Lynn Swann in the previous season's AFC Championship Game. Atkinson added to the reputation as the Raiders advanced through the playoffs to Super Bowl XI, as Atkinson inflicted another concussion to Swann in the Raiders' 1976 season opener. In the Raiders' 24–21 playoff win over the New England Patriots, Atkinson broke the nose of Patriots tight end Russ Francis. In reaction, Pittsburgh head coach Chuck Noll complained of a "criminal element" in Atkinson's play. Atkinson himself denied deliberately trying to injure anyone and pointed out at 6′0″ and 185 pounds, he was one of the smallest players on the field. The Raiders and their fans were often known to counter these accusations against Atkinson and Jack Tatum by pointing out the physical way Pittsburgh cornerback Mel Blount covered Oakland's speedy split end Cliff Branch.

Two of the Raiders' players (whose names were not revealed) bought marijuana from Red Hot Chili Peppers singer Anthony Kiedis' father, Blackie Dammett, smoked it before the game, and played the game under the effects of the drug. This was revealed on Kiedis' biography from 2004, Scar Tissue.

=== Minnesota Vikings ===
The Vikings, coached by Bud Grant, won the NFC Central for the eighth time in the last nine seasons with an 11–2–1 record, and advanced to their fourth Super Bowl in eight years. They were the only team who had lost three Super Bowls (they had previously lost Super Bowls IV, VIII and IX), and did not want to be the first one to lose four. They were the first team to appear in a fourth Super Bowl.

Once again, the Vikings had a powerful offense led by 36-year-old quarterback Fran Tarkenton and running back Chuck Foreman. In his 16th NFL season, Tarkenton was already the league's all-time leader in pass completions (3,186), passing yards (41,802), and touchdown passes (308). He had another fine season in 1976, completing 61.9 percent of his passes for 2,961 yards, 17 touchdowns, and only 8 interceptions. Foreman had the best season of his career, rushing for 1,155 yards and 13 touchdowns, while also catching 55 passes for 567 yards and another touchdown. Fullback Brent McClanahan also contributed 634 combined rushing and receiving yards. The Vikings also added two new weapons to their offense: veteran wide receiver Ahmad Rashad and rookie wide receiver Sammy White combined for 104 receptions, 1,577 receiving yards, and 13 touchdowns, while tackle Ron Yary once again anchored the offensive line.

The Vikings' "Purple People Eaters" defense, anchored by Carl Eller, Jim Marshall, and Alan Page, were also dominating teams again. During this regular season, they led the NFC in fewest points allowed (176). Also, defensive back Nate Wright led the team with 7 interceptions for 47 yards, while safety Paul Krause had 2 interceptions for 21 yards. Pro Bowl linebacker Matt Blair intercepted two passes and recovered five fumbles.

Tarkenton became the second quarterback to start three Super Bowls, following his Super Bowl VIII counterpart Bob Griese. Eleven players were on the roster for Super Bowl IV, VIII, IX, and XI for the Vikings: Bobby Bryant, Fred Cox, Carl Eller, Wally Hilgenberg, Paul Krause, Jim Marshall, Alan Page, Mick Tingelhoff, Ed White, Roy Winston and Ron Yary.

=== Playoffs ===
The Vikings went on to dominate the Washington Redskins, 35–20, and then defeated the Los Angeles Rams, 24–13, in the playoffs. Ten of the Vikings' points in the NFC Championship Game came from blocked kicks.

The Raiders overcame an 11-point fourth-quarter deficit to defeat the New England Patriots, the only team to beat the Raiders all season, 24–21, with the aid of a penalty call against the Patriots. New England's Ray Hamilton was tagged for roughing the passer in the fourth quarter, turning an incomplete pass on 3rd and 18 into a first down, and the Raiders went on to score on Stabler's 1-yard touchdown run with 14 seconds left in the contest.

In the AFC Championship Game Oakland then faced the Pittsburgh Steelers, a team which had won the two previous Super Bowls and defeated the Raiders in the playoffs in three out of the last four seasons. However, coming into this game without injured starting running backs Franco Harris and Rocky Bleier, the Steelers were soundly thrashed this time around, losing to Oakland, 24–7.

This was the first Super Bowl game to match both conferences' No. 1 seeds, the first one held in the Rose Bowl, the last Super Bowl to finish under daylight and the last where both teams' placekickers (Minnesota's Fred Cox and Oakland's Errol Mann) used the straight-on style.

Scheduled on the 9th day of January, the game marks the earliest Super Bowl played during the calendar year. The regular season started one week earlier than usual in order to avoid having playoff games on Christmas Day, which fell on a Saturday in 1976. By moving the season up, the divisional playoffs were held December 18 and 19, and the conference championship games Sunday, December 26. The local starting time for this Super Bowl, 12:47 pm Pacific Time, also was the earliest in history, two minutes earlier than Super Bowl VII at the nearby Los Angeles Memorial Coliseum in 1973.

The Raiders became the first West Division team from either conference to reach a post-merger Super Bowl. They also became the first team to play in a Super Bowl in their home state; the Raiders later played another in-state Super Bowl, Super Bowl XXXVII in San Diego, during the 2002 season.

== Broadcasting ==
The game was televised in the United States by NBC, with play-by-play announcer Curt Gowdy and color commentator Don Meredith. This was Meredith's last broadcast with NBC, as he returned to ABC to rejoin the Monday Night Football crew for the 1977 season, where he had been a commentator from 1970 through 1973. Bryant Gumbel, Lee Leonard, and analyst John Brodie anchored NBC's pregame, halftime, and postgame coverage. With kickoff at 12:30 p.m. PST, this remains the most recent Super Bowl completed in daylight.

== Entertainment ==
=== Pregame festivities ===
The pregame festivities featured the Los Angeles Unified School District (LAUSD) All-City Band and frisbee dog Ashley Whippet. Later, singer Vikki Carr sang "America the Beautiful". To date, this is the only game in Super Bowl history the national anthem was not sung. This was the third time in the game's history "America the Beautiful" was sung before a game, as Charley Pride sang the song at Super Bowl VIII three years prior, and the Grambling State University Band and a choir sang the same song at Super Bowl IX the following year.

This was the first Super Bowl where the official coin toss was held at midfield three minutes prior to kickoff. Prior to 1976, the official toss was held 30 minutes prior to kickoff, with captains called to midfield three minutes prior to kickoff so the referee could inform fans and media of the results of the toss. Jim Tunney became the last referee to conduct the Super Bowl coin toss ceremony by himself. The year before, former United States Secretary of the Navy John Warner became the first non-official to toss the coin. The next year, Chicago Bears great Red Grange (with Tunney as referee) began the tradition of celebrities or other special guests participating in the coin toss ceremony. This tradition then was slightly altered in Super Bowl LIV in February 2020, when Retired Colonel Charles E. McGee let referee Bill Vinovich toss the coin instead.

=== Halftime show ===
The halftime show was produced by Disney and was based on It's a Small World, an attraction at Disneyland and the Magic Kingdom. The show featured the cast members of The New Mickey Mouse Club. It was the first Super Bowl halftime show to include crowd participation as people in the stadium performed a mass card stunt on cue. The LAUSD All-City Band also played during the show.

== Game summary ==
=== First quarter ===
The Raiders took the opening kickoff and advanced all the way to the Vikings' 12-yard line on quarterback Ken Stabler's 25-yard pass to tight end Dave Casper and a 20-yard run by running back Clarence Davis, but came up empty after kicker Errol Mann hit the left upright on his 29-yard field goal attempt. Later in the quarter, after Minnesota had punted twice and Oakland once, the Vikings had a great opportunity to score when Minnesota linebacker Fred McNeill blocked Ray Guy's second punt and recovered the ball on the Raiders' 3-yard line. The Vikings' special teams' unit was known for blocking punts, but this was the first time it had happened to Guy, who only had three blocked in his 14-year Pro Football Hall of Fame career. However, two plays later, Minnesota running back Brent McClanahan fumbled the ball while being tackled by linebacker Phil Villapiano, and linebacker Willie Hall recovered the ball for Oakland on the Raider's 3 yard line. A 35-yard run by Davis around left end from the Oakland 5 ignited a Raider's drive. On its sixth play Stabler completed another 25-yard pass to Casper, who broke through what Stabler called "10 tackles" en route to the Vikings 7 yard-line. Minnesota's defense proved stout, and kept Oakland out of the end zone as time expired in the first quarter.

=== Second quarter ===
Stalled by Minnesota deep in Vikings territory to start the second quarter, Oakland was forced to kick a field goal. Mann connected from 24-yards out 48 seconds into the period, giving the Raiders a 3-0 lead.

After forcing Minnesota to punt following a three-and-out, the Raiders took possession at their own 36. Stabler completed a 19-yard pass to Casper to reach the Minnesota 26. Running back Carl Garrett carried the ball on three consecutive plays and gained 20 yards, then Stabler hit wide receiver Fred Biletnikoff along the right sideline for 5 yards to the 1-yard line. A 1-yard touchdown pass from Stabler to Casper, his fourth and final reception of the game, completed the 64-yard 10-play drive and increased the Raiders' lead to 10–0. On the Vikings' next possession, running back Chuck Foreman gained 7 yards on first down and 6 yards on second down, but a holding penalty on offensive tackle Ron Yary made it 2nd-and-13. Tarkenton threw an incomplete pass to wide receiver Sammy White, then a long pass to wide receiver Ahmad Rashad was broken up by cornerback Willie Brown, resulting in another three-and-out. Oakland got the ball back in excellent field position, after cornerback/punt returner Neal Colzie returned Minnesota's punt 25 yards to the Vikings' 35-yard line. After three running plays, Stabler completed an 18-yard pass to Biletnikoff at the 1-yard line, and running back Pete Banaszak scored on a 1-yard touchdown run on the next play. Mann missed the extra point attempt wide right, leaving the Raiders up 16–0 with 3:33 left in the half. To this point, Minnesota had picked up only one first down. They added three more before halftime, including a meaningless 26-yard completion from quarterback Fran Tarkenton to Foreman before time expired, which ended up being their longest gain of the entire game. The score at halftime marked the fourth time in as many Super Bowl games the Vikings failed to score in the first half.

=== Third quarter ===
The second half began with Minnesota taking the kick. After punts by both teams, Oakland's Colzie returned another Vikings' punt 12 yards to the Raiders' 46. An 18-yard run by Davis and a 10-yard reception by wide receiver Cliff Branch set up a 40-yard Mann field goal, increasing the Raiders' lead to 19–0. With ten minutes gone in the third period, the Vikings had gone 40 minutes without scoring, same as in all their previous Super Bowls; Oakland also had enough points to win, the same as in Minnesota Super Bowl losses to Kansas City in 1969, Miami in 1973, and Pittsburgh in 1974.

Tarkenton threw three consecutive incomplete passes on the Vikings' ensuing drive, setting up a Minnesota punt. However, instead of another three-and-out, Oakland linebacker Ted Hendricks received a roughing the kicker penalty for a late hit on Minnesota punter Neil Clabo. The five yard penalty and a new set of downs set the Vikings up for a 12-play, 68-yard drive, with Tarkenton completing passes to tight end Stu Voigt, wide receiver Ahmad Rashad, and Foreman for gains of 15, 21, and 10 yards, respectively. Tarkenton then hit White for an 8-yard touchdown pass, cutting their deficit to 19–7 with 47 seconds remaining in the period.

=== Fourth quarter ===
Vikings defensive tackle Alan Page sacked Stabler for an 11-yard loss to start the fourth quarter, leading to an Oakland punt. The Vikings then advanced to the Oakland 37-yard line behind Tarkenton completions to White of 14 and 18 yards, with the second featuring a combined hit from safeties Jack Tatum and Skip Thomas which sent White's helmet and mouthguard flying (and left him momentarily knocked out). On 3rd-and-3, Hall intercepted a pass from Tarkenton and returned it 16 yards to the Minnesota 46. Three plays later, Biletnikoff's 48-yard reception from Stabler moved the ball to the Vikings' 2-yard line. Banaszak rushed in for another touchdown, increasing the Raiders' lead to 26–7. All three Raiders offensive touchdowns had been preceded on the previous play by key receptions by Biletnikoff.

White returned the ensuing kickoff 19 yards to the Minnesota 32-yard line. Four plays later Tarkenton completed a 25-yard pass to Rashad to the Oakland 28. On the next play, cornerback Willie Brown put the game completely out of reach by intercepting a pass intended for White and returned it 75 yards for an Oakland touchdown. Mann's extra point attempt again went wide right, but Oakland's lead was now 32–7.

After both teams turned the ball over on downs, a four-score Minnesota comeback was considered impossible and the Vikings brought in backup quarterback Bob Lee. He then led Minnesota 86 yards in 9 plays, scoring on a 14-yard touchdown pass to Voigt with only 25 seconds remaining. Oakland wide receiver Mike Siani recovered Minnesota's ensuing onside kick to end the game and secure the Raiders' first Super Bowl title. The Vikings walked sadly off the field with their 4th Super Bowl loss against no victories; as of 2026, Minnesota has come close to returning to a Super Bowl numerous times but not done so.

== Post-game ==
Stabler finished the game with 12 out of 19 pass completions for 180 yards and 1 touchdown. Davis, who was the top rusher in the game, gained 137 yards on just 16 rushing attempts, an average of 8.5 yards per carry. Of Davis' 16 carries, 11 were runs to the left side, which is where the blocking of guard Gene Upshaw, tackle Art Shell and Casper dominated defensive end Jim Marshall and linebacker Wally Hilgenberg. The Raiders respected the Vikings defensive stars but felt that Upshaw and Shell were so much bigger and stronger than Marshall, Hilgenberg and Alan Page that they would neutralize the Vikings' exceptional quickness and dominate the line of scrimmage; this plan was successful as Marshall made no tackles in the game and Hilgenberg made only two. Oakland set a new rushing record for the Super Bowl with 266 yards gained. As of Super Bowl LVI, only the Washington Redskins have rushed for more yards, doing so in both Super Bowls XVII and XXII. The Raiders had 52 rushing carries, becoming the third consecutive Viking Super Bowl opponent to rush more than 50 times.

Fred Biletnikoff earned MVP honors after his 4 receptions for 79 yards; his selection has been widely praised historically because the voters recognized while his overall numbers weren't overwhelming (until Cooper Kupp was the MVP of Super Bowl LVI, Biletnikoff was the only wide receiver to earn such an honor despite not having at least 100 yards receiving), his plays set up three of Oakland's TDs and were the key to making the game a rout for the Raiders. Casper finished the game with 4 receptions for 70 yards and 1 touchdown. Colzie returned 4 punts for a Super Bowl record 43 yards. Foreman had a solid performance for Minnesota, contributing 44 rushing yards and 62 receiving yards. Tarkenton completed 17 out of 35 pass attempts for 205 yards, 1 touchdown, and 2 interceptions. White recorded 163 total yards, catching 5 passes for 77 yards and 1 touchdown, rushing once for 7 yards, and returning 4 kickoffs for 79 yards. The Raiders won their first Super Bowl and according to Brown, winning Super Bowl XI "made up for the other Raiders who came before and didn't have a chance to participate on a winning Super Bowl team. This victory meant not only a lot to me, it meant a lot to the entire Raider organization." The win was particularly satisfying for Brown, who scored a Super Bowl touchdown and earned his first championship ring after 14 years of professional football.

=== Box score ===
Super Bowl XI: Oakland Raiders 32, Minnesota Vikings 14

Quarter	1	2	3	4	Total
Raiders (AFC)	0	16	3	13	32
Vikings (NFC)	0	0	7	7	14

at Rose Bowl, Pasadena, California

- Date: January 9, 1977
- Game time: 12:47 p.m. PST
- Game weather: 74 °F (23.3 °C), sunny

Scoring summary

Quarter	Time	Drive			Team	Scoring information	Score	
Quarter	Time	Plays	Yards	TOP	Team	Scoring information	OAK	MIN
2	14:12	12	90	5:23	OAK	24-yard field goal by Errol Mann	3	0
2	7:10	10	64	5:21	OAK	Dave Casper 1-yard touchdown reception from Ken Stabler, Mann kick good	10	0
2	3:33	5	35	2:20	OAK	Pete Banaszak 1-yard touchdown run, Mann kick no good (wide right)	16	0
3	5:16	5	31	2:12	OAK	40-yard field goal by Mann	19	0
3	:47	12	68	4:29	MIN	Sammy White 8-yard touchdown reception from Fran Tarkenton, Fred Cox kick good	19	7
4	7:39	4	54	2:27	OAK	Banaszak 2-yard touchdown run, Mann kick good	26	7
4	5:43	—	—	—	OAK	Interception returned 75 yards for touchdown by Willie Brown, Mann kick no good (wide right)	32	7
4	:25	9	86	1:31	MIN	Stu Voigt 13-yard touchdown reception from Bob Lee, Cox kick good	32	14
"TOP" = time of possession. For other American football terms, see Glossary of American football.							32	14

== Final statistics ==
Sources: NFL.com Super Bowl XI, Super Bowl XI Play Finder Oak, Super Bowl XI Play Finder Min

=== Statistical comparison ===
Statistic	Oakland Raiders	Minnesota Vikings
First downs	21	20
First downs rushing	13	2
First downs passing	8	15
First downs penalty	0	3
Third down efficiency	9/18	6/17
Fourth down efficiency	0/1	1/2
Net yards rushing	266	71
Rushing attempts	52	26
Yards per rush	5.1	2.7
Passing – Completions/attempts	12/19	24/44
Times sacked-total yards	2–17	1–4
Interceptions thrown	0	2
Net yards passing	163	282
Total net yards	429	353
Punt returns-total yards	4–43	3–14
Kickoff returns-total yards	2–47	7–136
Interceptions-total return yards	2–91	0–0
Punts-average yardage	5–32.4	7–37.9
Fumbles-lost	0–0	1–1
Penalties-total yards	4–30	2–25
Time of possession	33:27	26:33
Turnovers	0	3

=== Individual leaders ===
Raiders passing
	C/ATT^{1}	Yds	TD	INT	Rating
Ken Stabler	12/19	180	1	0	111.7
Raiders rushing
	Car^{2}	Yds	TD	LG^{3}	Yds/Car
Clarence Davis	16	137	0	35	8.56
Mark van Eeghen	18	73	0	11	4.06
Pete Banaszak	10	19	2	6	1.90
Carl Garrett	4	19	0	13	4.75
Hubert Ginn	2	9	0	9	4.50
Mike Rae	2	9	0	11	4.50
Raiders receiving
	Rec^{4}	Yds	TD	LG^{3}	Target^{5}
Fred Biletnikoff	4	79	0	48	7
Dave Casper	4	70	1	25	7
Cliff Branch	3	20	0	10	4
Carl Garrett	1	11	0	11	1

Vikings passing
	C/ATT^{1}	Yds	TD	INT	Rating
Fran Tarkenton	17/35	205	1	2	52.7
Bob Lee	7/9	81	1	0	141.2
Vikings rushing
	Car^{2}	Yds	TD	LG^{3}	Yds/Car
Chuck Foreman	17	44	0	7	2.59
Sammy Johnson	2	9	0	8	4.50
Sammy White	1	7	0	7	7.00
Robert Miller	2	4	0	3	2.00
Bob Lee	1	4	0	4	4.00
Brent McClanahan	3	3	0	2	1.00
Vikings receiving
	Rec^{4}	Yds	TD	LG^{3}	Target^{5}
Sammy White	5	77	1	29	13
Chuck Foreman	5	62	0	26	9
Stu Voigt	4	49	1	15	5
Robert Miller	4	19	0	13	6
Ahmad Rashad	3	53	0	25	5
Sammy Johnson	3	26	0	17	3

^{1}Completions/attempts ^{2}Carries ^{3}Long gain ^{4}Receptions ^{5}Times targeted

=== Records set ===
The following records were set in Super Bowl XI, according to the official NFL.com box score and the ProFootball reference.com game summary.

Some records have to meet NFL minimum number of attempts to be recognized. The minimums are shown (in parentheses).

Player records set
Passing records
Most attempts, game	35	Fran Tarkenton (Minnesota)
Most attempts, career	89	Fran Tarkenton (Minnesota)
Most completions, career	46	Fran Tarkenton (Minnesota)
Most passing yards, career	489	Fran Tarkenton (Minnesota)
Most interceptions thrown, career	6	Fran Tarkenton (Minnesota)
Receiving records
Most receptions, career	15	Chuck Foreman (Minnesota)
Defense
Most interception yards gained, game	75	Willie Brown (Oakland)
Most interception yards gained, career	75	Willie Brown (Oakland)
Longest interception return	75 yards	Willie Brown (Oakland)
Special teams
Most punt return yards gained, game	43	Neal Colzie (Oakland)
Records tied
Longest scoring play	75-yard interception return	Willie Brown
Most touchdowns, game	2	Pete Banaszak (Oakland)
Most touchdowns, career	2	Pete Banaszak (Oakland)
Most rushing touchdowns, game	2	Pete Banaszak (Oakland)
Most rushing touchdowns, career	2	Pete Banaszak (Oakland)
Most interceptions returned for TD, game	1	Willie Brown
Most kickoff returns, game	4	Sammy White (Minnesota)
Most 40-plus yard field goals, game	1	Errol Mann (Oakland)

Team records set
Most Super Bowl appearances	4	Vikings
Most Super Bowl losses	4	Vikings
Points
Most points scored in any quarter of play	16 (2nd)	Raiders
Most points, second quarter	16	Raiders
Touchdowns
Longest touchdown scoring drive	86 yards	Vikings
Net yards
Most net yards, rushing and passing	429	Raiders
Rushing
Most rushing yards (net)	266	Raiders
Passing
Most passing attempts	44	Vikings
Most passes completed	24	Vikings
Most yards passing (net)	282	Vikings
First downs
Most first downs, passing	15	Vikings
Defense
Most yards allowed	429	Vikings
Most yards allowed in a win	353	Raiders
Kickoff returns
Most yards gained, game	136	Vikings
Punt returns
Most yards gained, game	43	Raiders
Highest average return yardage, game (3 returns)	10.8	Raiders (43–4)
Records tied
Fewest points, first half	0	Vikings
Most touchdowns, losing team	2	Vikings
Fewest rushing touchdowns	0	Vikings
Most passing touchdowns	2	Vikings
Fewest first downs, rushing	2	Vikings
Most kickoff returns, game	7	Vikings
Fewest first downs, penalty	0	Raiders
Most touchdowns scored by interception return	1	Raiders
Fewest turnovers, game	0	Raiders

Turnovers are defined as the number of times losing the ball on interceptions and fumbles.

Team records set, both team totals
	Total	Raiders	Vikings
Points
Most points scored, second half	30	16	14
Net yards
Most net yards, rushing and passing	782	429	353
Rushing
Most rushing yards (net)	337	266	71
Passing
Most passes completed	36	12	24
Most passing yards (net)	445	163	282
First downs
Most first downs	41	21	20
Fumbles
Fewest fumbles	1	0	1
Punt returns
Most yards gained, game	57	43	14
Records tied, both team totals
Most touchdowns	6	4	2
Most rushing attempts	78	52	26
Most first downs, passing	23	8	15

== Starting lineups ==
Hall of Fame‡

Oakland	Position	Minnesota
Offense
Cliff Branch‡	WR	Ahmad Rashad
Art Shell‡	LT	Steve Riley
Gene Upshaw‡	LG	Charlie Goodrum
Dave Dalby	C	Mick Tingelhoff‡
George Buehler	RG	Ed White
John Vella	RT	Ron Yary‡
Dave Casper‡	TE	Stu Voigt
Fred Biletnikoff‡	WR	Sammy White
Ken Stabler‡	QB	Fran Tarkenton‡
Clarence Davis	RB	Brent McClanahan
Mark van Eeghen	RB	Chuck Foreman
Defense
John Matuszak	LE	Carl Eller‡
Dave Rowe	LT	Doug Sutherland
Otis Sistrunk	RT	Alan Page‡
Phil Villapiano	RE	Jim Marshall
Monte Johnson	LLB	Matt Blair
Willie Hall	MLB	Jeff Siemon
Ted Hendricks‡	RLB	Wally Hilgenberg
Skip Thomas	LCB	Nate Wright
Willie Brown‡	RCB	Bobby Bryant
George Atkinson	LS	Jeff Wright
Jack Tatum	RS	Paul Krause‡

== Officials ==
- Referee: Jim Tunney #32 second Super Bowl (VI)
- Umpire: Lou Palazzi #51 third Super Bowl (IV, VII)
- Head linesman: Ed Marion #26 third Super Bowl (V, IX)
- Line judge: Bill Swanson #38 first Super Bowl
- Back judge: Tom Kelleher #25 third Super Bowl (IV, VII)
- Field judge: Armen Terzian #23 first Super Bowl
- Alternate referee Gene Barth #14 worked Super Bowl XVIII as referee
- Alternate umpire Pat Harder #88 was alternate for Super Bowls V and XVI

Note: A seven-official system was not used until 1978

== Aftermath ==
The NFL Films highlight film was the first Super Bowl recap to feature radio clips to narrate key plays throughout the game. The play-by-play announcers were Bill King (Raiders) and Joe McConnell (Vikings).

The Vikings' loss in Super Bowl XI meant the franchise finished with a 0–4 Super Bowl record under head coach Bud Grant, even though in the same eight-season span their regular season record was 87–24–1, which was the best in the NFL.

Grant coached Minnesota eight more seasons, but never managed to guide the team back to a Super Bowl. In fact, as of the 2025 season, this remains the Vikings' most recent appearance in a Super Bowl, although they have qualified for the postseason a further 24 times and have reached the NFC Championship six times in 1977, 1987, 1998, 2000, 2009 and 2017. Grant was the last surviving coach from the first 14 Super Bowls until his death on 11 March 2023.

Despite a few mediocre seasons, the Raiders would remain an NFL power until 1985 and win two more Super Bowls in their 1980 and 1983 seasons – the second after moving to Los Angeles in 1982. In contrast to their 13–1 1976 regular season, both of these would be won in major upsets. The Raiders would fall to mediocrity in the latter part of the 1980s and most of the 1990s when they were affected by stadium problems which saw them again playing in Oakland in 1995 – although they did reach the AFC Championship in 1991 and be demolished 51–3 by the Bills – before a 33–15 three-season record between 2000 and 2002 saw them return to the Super Bowl for the first time in 19 seasons, losing out to the Tampa Bay Buccaneers. Since then, the Raiders have been mainly NFL cellar-dwellers, with only two postseason appearances; one in 2016 and again in 2021, along with a record of seven straight seasons with no more than five victories between 2003 and 2009. Principal owner Al Davis died on 8 October 2011 and John Madden died on 28 December 2021. The picture of Madden celebrating this victory was on the cover of the next gen version of Madden NFL 23.
