= Paul Dickson (American football) =

American football player (1937–2011)

No. 71, 76, 68
- Positions: Defensive tackle, offensive tackle

Personal information
- Born: February 26, 1937; Waco, Texas, U.S.
- Died: June 7, 2011 (aged 74); Minneapolis, Minnesota, U.S.
- Listed height: 6 ft 5 in (1.96 m)
- Listed weight: 252 lb (114 kg)

Career information
- High school: Waco
- College: Baylor
- NFL draft: 1959: 1st round, 9th overall pick

Career history
- Los Angeles Rams (1959); Dallas Cowboys (1960); Cleveland Browns (1961)*; Minnesota Vikings (1961–1970); St. Louis Cardinals (1971); Chicago Bears (1972)*
- * Offseason or practice squad member only

Awards and highlights
- NFL champion (1969); Second-team All-SWC (1958)

Career NFL statistics
- Games played: 152
- Games started: 87
- Fumble recoveries: 4
- Sacks: 25.5
- Stats at Pro Football Reference

Paul Serafin Dickson (February 26, 1937 – June 7, 2011) was an American professional football defensive tackle in the National Football League (NFL) for the Los Angeles Rams, Dallas Cowboys, Minnesota Vikings, and St. Louis Cardinals. He played college football for Baylor University.

== Early life ==
Dickson attended Waco High School before moving on to Baylor University, where he became a two-way right tackle and a two-year starter. As a sophomore, he was a part of the upset win (13–7) against the University of Tennessee in the 1957 Sugar Bowl.

== Professional career ==
=== Los Angeles Rams ===
Dickson was selected by the Los Angeles Rams in the first round (9th overall) of the 1959 NFL draft. The Rams used him as a backup offensive tackle. He was waived on September 13, 1960.

=== Dallas Cowboys ===
On September 14, 1960, Dickson was claimed off waivers by the Dallas Cowboys and played as an offensive right tackle (8 starts).

The Cowboys traded its first round draft choice in the 1961 NFL draft, as part of the deal to get Eddie LeBaron from the Washington Redskins, so on December 27, 1960, he was traded along with a first round pick (#4-Gary Collins) in the 1962 NFL draft, in exchange for the Cleveland Browns first round draft choice (13th overall) in 1961, in order to select future hall of famer Bob Lilly, the first draft choice in Cowboys franchise history.

=== Cleveland Browns ===
On September 12, 1961, the Cleveland Browns traded him along with Jim Marshall, Jim Prestel, Dick Grecni, Jamie Caleb and Billy Gault, to the Minnesota Vikings in exchange for a second-round choice (#17-Chuck Hinton) and an eleventh-round pick (#142-Ronnie Meyers).

=== Minnesota Vikings ===
In 1961, Dickson was one of the original players in the Minnesota Vikings inaugural season. Following the trade, he was switched from right offensive tackle to defensive tackle - a position he would play for the rest of his career. In practice, he was known for playing at full-speed, much to the irritation of his teammates on the offensive side of the ball. He was the regular starter at right defensive tackle and a key player from 1962 to 1967.

In 1968, he was passed on the depth chart by future hall of famer Alan Page. The next year, although he was a backup, he was still considered a part of the Vikings' famous "Purple People Eaters" or "The Four Norsemen" defensive line, which consisted mainly of Marshall (DE), Page (DT), Gary Larsen (DT), and Carl Eller (DE). He played in Super Bowl IV at Tulane Stadium in New Orleans, Louisiana, losing to the Kansas City Chiefs.

In 1971, he spent time on the team's taxi squad before being released.

=== St. Louis Cardinals ===
On November 10, 1971, he was claimed off waivers by the St. Louis Cardinals, where he was reunited with his former defensive line coach with the Vikings, Bob Hollway, then in his first season as Cardinals head coach. He Joined the team on November 20, after reconsidering his retirement decision. He was cut during the 1972 training camp.

=== Chicago Bears ===
On May 3, 1972, he was claimed off waivers by the Chicago Bears, but was released before the start of the season.

== Personal life ==
Dickson returned to Minneapolis, after his one season in St. Louis, to live and work in sales, marketing and customer relations for computer companies. He was also a member and president of the Minnesota chapter of the NFL Alumni Association. He was nicknamed "Suitcase" because of his large hands and feet.

In January 1971, he joined Viking teammate Marshall in a snowmobile excursion that ended in tragedy. Planning to travel across the Great Divide of the Rocky Mountains, a party of 16 became fragmented, and then got caught in a blizzard, having to spend a frigid night in the snow with few provisions. Dickson, Marshall and three others huddled together in a grove of trees, and lit all the cash they had on them -- "Hundreds, twenties, ones, they were all the same denomination: burnable," Marshall said—in order to start a small fire to avoid freezing. Although everyone was rescued the next day, Minneapolis Federal Reserve President Hugh Galusha died of hypothermia.

On June 7, 2011, he died of a blood infection. He was survived by his second wife Maureen and his two sons from his first marriage.
