= Armen Terzian =

American-Armenian football official (1915–1989)

Armen Terzian (1915–1989) was an American-Armenian American football official in the National Football League (NFL) from 1961 to 1981. He was a field judge and wore uniform number 23.

== Career ==
Armen was the field judge for the New Orleans Saints' first regular season game vs. the Los Angeles Rams on September 17, 1967, at Tulane Stadium. Terzian signaled the Saints' first touchdown when John Gilliam returned the opening kickoff 94 yards.

Terzian officiated an NFC Divisional Playoff game in December 1975 at Metropolitan Stadium between the Minnesota Vikings and the visiting Dallas Cowboys. Following a late Hail Mary touchdown pass by the Cowboys—that could have been called off for pass interference—to take the lead, an angry fan threw a whiskey bottle that hit Terzian in the forehead. He was momentarily unconscious, though Armen did not require stitches. Terzian wore a large white bandage around his forehead and exited the game on foot during the final few seconds.

The following season Terzian officiated Super Bowl XI, also a Vikings' loss.

During a 1978 game between the Kansas City Chiefs and Buffalo Bills at Rich Stadium, Chiefs coach Marv Levy protested a call by Terzian by screaming "Hey Armen! Hey you over-officious jerk!". The sound bite has been a staple of NFL Films highlights of coaches on the sideline since.

When the NFL adopted an instant replay review system in 1986, Armen became a replay official. Under the system used at the time which is similar to the one used in American college football today, the replay official would page one of the officials (in this case, the umpire) who would inform the referee that he wanted to take a closer look at the play to see if something was missed. Only the replay official could initiate a review; unlike today's NFL, coaches were not allowed to challenge plays (the collegiate system also allows challenges, although the procedure is different).

Terzian's career ended because of an incident in Week 3 of the 1988 season, during the game between the New York Giants and Dallas Cowboys at Texas Stadium. The Cowboys were to receive the opening kickoff, and running back Darryl Clack stood at his two-yard line to receive the kick from Raul Allegre. Clack lost sight of the ball in the sunlight and could not field it cleanly. It bounced into the end zone, where Clack picked it up and was swarmed by Giants defenders. Mark Collins tackled Clack and referee Pat Haggerty ruled the play a safety and gave two points to New York.

The play had not been called correctly on the field as it was treated as a fumble and not a muffed kick. Since Clack had muffed the kick, the rules dictated that the play should have resulted in a touchback and a Dallas possession at their 20-yard line. Armen never made the call to review the play, and the safety stood. It also proved to be the margin of victory in the 12–10 result, with the Giants defeating the Cowboys. Terzian admitted his error later, releasing a statement to this effect to the press during the game. NFL Commissioner Pete Rozelle chose to suspend Terzian for his actions after the game, and Terzian responded by submitting his resignation which Rozelle accepted several weeks later.

== Death ==
Terzian died in 1989 at the age of 74.
