= Gary Larsen =

American football player (born 1942)

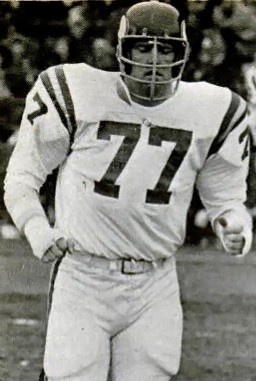
- Larsen with the Minnesota Vikings

No. 83, 77
- Position: Defensive tackle

Personal information
- Born: March 13, 1940 (age 86); Fargo, North Dakota, U.S.
- Listed height: 6 ft 5 in (1.96 m)
- Listed weight: 261 lb (118 kg)

Career information
- High school: MSTC (Moorhead, Minnesota)
- College: Concordia–Moorhead (1957, 1961–1963)
- NFL draft: 1964: 10th round, 133rd overall pick

Career history
- Los Angeles Rams (1964); Minnesota Vikings (1965–1974)

Awards and highlights
- NFL champion (1969); 2× Pro Bowl (1969, 1970); 50 Greatest Vikings; Minnesota Vikings 25th Anniversary Team

Career NFL statistics
- Fumble recoveries: 12
- Sacks: 39.5
- Stats at Pro Football Reference

Gary Larsen (born March 13, 1940) is an American former professional football player who was a defensive tackle in the National Football League (NFL).

== Early life ==
Larsen was born on March 13, 1940, in Fargo, North Dakota, to Alton and Ethel Larsen. He grew up on a wheat farm near Moorhead and Sabin in northern Minnesota. His father died in a farm accident when Larsen was in junior high school. He attended MSTC (Moorhead State Teachers College) High School in Moorhead, where he played eight-man football. As a center on the school's basketball team, he set school scoring records over his three-year career. He first played center as a 14-year old sophomore at 6 ft 2 in (1.88 m), but was 6 ft 5 in (1.96 m) as a senior.

He also was a discus thrower and threw shot put on the school's track team (setting conference records in those events), and was an outstanding offensive and defensive player on the school's football team, playing as a lineman and in the backfield. In 1956, he was selected by the Minneapolis Sunday Tribune as a lineman on its six and eight-man All-State high school football team; as well as being selected All-City by The Fargo Forum. He played football from his freshman year on, with the team winning conference titles in 1953, 1955 and 1956, losing only one game during those three years.

Basketball was his first love in high school. As a junior, he led the basketball team to a conference title and led the conference in scoring. During his senior year (1957), Larsen led the MSTC High School Baby Dragons to victory over the Moorhead High School Spuds in the Minnesota District 23 basketball tournament in March 1957. Defeating Moorhead in this game was one of Larsen's biggest high school thrills, though the Baby Dragons lost in the next round, with Larsen tying as game high-scorer with 18 points.

== College career ==
He played college football at Concordia College in two separate stints. He enrolled at Concordia in 1957 and played on the team that won the Minnesota Intercollegiate Athletic Conference (MIAC) title. In 1958, he left to join the United States Marines due to struggling with his grades. He spent three years there (playing two in service football) and started a family with his newly married wife Wende that resulted in him having a three month old daughter by the time he returned to Concordia in 1961. A stout defensive tackle and/or end, teams averaged 2.9 yards per carry versus Concordia in his senior season. He played varsity football and basketball in the 1962-63 and 1963-64 school years. In a February 1964 basketball game against the North Dakota State University Bison, Larsen had 26 points and 17 rebounds.

Larsen was twice selected All-MIAC at tackle. He was the football team's co-captain in his senior year.

== Professional career ==
=== Los Angeles Rams ===
The Los Angeles Rams selected Larsen in the 10th round of the 1964 NFL draft, 133rd overall. He started his NFL career in 1964 with the Rams, backing up future Hall of Fame left tackle Merlin Olsen (part of the Rams' Fearsome Foursome of Olsen, Roosevelt Grier, David "Deacon" Jones and Lamar Lundy). When Larsen would come in the game at Olsen's spot at left tackle, Olsen would move over to take Lundy's spot at left defensive end. Larsen started in the final game of the 1964 season against the Green Bay Packers, recovering one or two fumbles. After Larsen's rookie season, he was traded as a "throw-in" part of a deal that sent Larsen and former All-Pro receiver Jim Phillips to the Minnesota Vikings for Jack Snow (drafted by the Vikings to his disapproval) in 1965. Larsen was happy with the trade.

=== Minnesota Vikings ===
At the time he came to Minnesota in 1965, the Vikings had left defensive end Carl Eller (a fellow second-year player) and right defensive end Jim Marshall on the roster. Eller would go on to a Hall of Fame career with the Vikings. Marshall was a member of the first Vikings team in 1961, and played 19 years, with 270 consecutive starts, for the team. Larsen started nine games in 1965 and all 14 games in 1966, playing at left tackle next to Eller. In 1967, future Hall of Famer Alan Page was drafted to play defensive tackle, becoming the final piece of what became generally known as the "Purple People Eaters" with Eller, Marshall, and Larsen; the four of whom originally referring to themselves as the "Purple Gang".

However, the Purple People Eater unit did not start with Page's joining the team in 1967. Rather, Page replaced Larsen who had started at left tackle next to Eller in 1966, with veteran Paul Dickson starting the majority of games at right tackle, as he had in 1966. The Vikings had a 3–8–3 record in 1967. In 1968, Vikings coach Bud Grant moved Larsen back to the starting lineup at left tackle, with Page at right tackle and Dickson as a backup.

The team was markedly improved in 1968, winning the NFL's Central Division with an 8–6 record. Grant attributed the team's improvement in large part to the defensive line. Larsen's play was outstanding (including an early season game where he tackled Detroit Lions quarterback Bill Munson five times for losses); and the versatile Page, who could play any position on the line, improved the team's pass rush. In 1968, Larsen had 10 quarterback sacks, Eller eight, Page 11 and Marshall 10; all but Larsen being selected to the Pro Bowl.

For the next four seasons (1969-72) Larsen started every Vikings game at left tackle, and started 12 of 14 games in 1973, all alongside Eller, Page and Marshall. He played out his option with the Vikings in 1974, and the Vikings did not offer him a new contract in 1975.

Larsen (nicknamed the “Norse Nightmare”) was a key piece of the unit's success because Larsen gave Eller, Marshall and Page the freedom to go to where the football was located during a play because, as Jim Marshall said, "'he had our backs all the time'". The four linemen would reach the Super Bowl three times (all losses), twice as a starting unit: Super Bowl IV (doing so by winning the 1969 NFL Championship Game), Super Bowl VIII and Super Bowl IX. Larsen did not start in Super Bowl IX, his final game as a player. The 35-year old Larsen had been supplanted by Doug Sutherland in the lineup during the season due to injuries to his foot along with a sore knee; Larsen starting six games and Sutherland eight during the 1974 regular season.

In 1969, the entire unit was elected to the Pro Bowl (the first time one team sent four defensive linemen), and none of the unit missed a game from 1968 to 1973. Larsen made the Pro Bowl for the second and last time in 1970, along with Eller and Page.

Sacks were not officially tracked until 1982, but statisticians have retroactively accounted for a majority of NFL sacks going back to 1960, with Larsen being found to have had 38.5 sacks in his career, with ten occurring in 1968. Larsen was recognized as one of the 50 Greatest Vikings in 2010.

== Personal life ==
Larsen and his wife Wende have four daughters. As of 2013, Larsen lived in Lacey, Washington with his wife after years spent in Bellevue, Washington managing a Ford dealership. In 2013, Larsen was one of more than 4,500 former football players who filed a lawsuit against the league over concussions and other head injuries.
