= Doug Sutherland (American football) =

American football player (1948–2022)

No. 60, 69
- Position: Defensive tackle

Personal information
- Born: August 1, 1948; Superior, Wisconsin, U.S.
- Died: April 5, 2022 (aged 73)
- Listed height: 6 ft 3 in (1.91 m)
- Listed weight: 250 lb (113 kg)

Career information
- High school: Superior
- College: UW–Superior
- NFL draft: 1970: 14th round, 348th overall pick

Career history
- New Orleans Saints (1970); Minnesota Vikings (1971–1980); Seattle Seahawks (1981)

Awards and highlights
- 50 Greatest Vikings

Career NFL statistics
- Fumble recoveries: 4
- Stats at Pro Football Reference

Douglas A. Sutherland (August 1, 1948 – April 5, 2022) was an American professional football player who was a defensive tackle in the National Football League (NFL).

== Career ==
He played college football at the University of Wisconsin–Superior in his hometown of Superior, Wisconsin. He was selected in the 14th round of the 1970 NFL draft with the New Orleans Saints. He became a part of the famous Purple People Eaters for the Minnesota Vikings from 1971 through 1980, primarily filling in for Gary Larsen in 1975. He played in Super Bowls VIII, IX and XI. He finished his NFL career in 1981 with the Seattle Seahawks.

In his career, Sutherland recorded 29 sacks.

== Death ==
Sutherland died on April 5, 2022 at the age of 73.
