= Jim Marshall (defensive end) =

American football player (1937–2025)

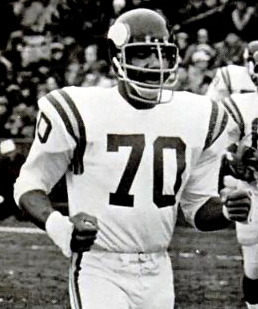
- Marshall, c. 1970

No. 64, 80, 70
- Position: Defensive end

Personal information
- Born: December 30, 1937; Wilsonville, Kentucky, U.S. (Note: Some sources list Danville, Kentucky.)
- Died: June 3, 2025 (aged 87); Minneapolis, Minnesota, U.S.
- Listed height: 6 ft 4 in (1.93 m)
- Listed weight: 248 lb (112 kg)

Career information
- High school: East (Columbus, Ohio)
- College: Ohio State (1956–1958)
- NFL draft: 1960: 4th round, 44th overall pick
- AFL draft: 1960

Career history
- Saskatchewan Roughriders (1959); Cleveland Browns (1960); Minnesota Vikings (1961–1979)

Awards and highlights
- NFL champion (1969); 3× Second-team All-Pro (1964, 1968, 1969); 2× Pro Bowl (1968, 1969); 50 Greatest Vikings; Minnesota Vikings 25th Anniversary Team; Minnesota Vikings 40th Anniversary Team; Minnesota Vikings Ring of Honor; Minnesota Vikings No. 70 retired; National champion (1957); Third-team All-American (1958); 2× Second-team All-Big Ten (1957, 1958); NFL records: Most consecutive games played with one team: 270; Most consecutive starts by a defensive player: 270 (Note: 289, including playoffs)

Career NFL statistics
- Sacks: 130.5 (Note: Sacks were not officially tracked by the NFL until 1982, but retroactively, statisticians have tracked sacks for careers such as Marshall.)
- Safeties: 1
- Fumble recoveries: 30
- Interceptions: 1
- Interception yards: 30
- Defensive touchdowns: 1
- Games played: 282
- Games started: 277
- Stats at Pro Football Reference

James Lawrence Marshall (December 30, 1937 – June 3, 2025) was an American professional football player who was a defensive end in the National Football League (NFL) for 20 seasons, primarily with the Minnesota Vikings. He recovered an NFL career-record 29 opponents' fumbles. He also holds the league career marks for most consecutive starts (270) and most games played (282) by a defensive player. The Vikings retired his No. 70, and he was inducted into the Vikings Ring of Honor.

Marshall played college football for the Ohio State Buckeyes, before leaving to play for the Saskatchewan Roughriders of the Canadian Football League (CFL). He was selected by the Cleveland Browns in the fourth round of the 1960 NFL draft. Marshall played one season with the Browns before being traded to the Vikings. In 1964, he recovered a fumble and returned it 66 yards in the wrong direction into the Vikings' end zone, where he threw the ball out of bounds, resulting in a safety for the opposition San Francisco 49ers.

== Early life ==
Marshall was born on December 30, 1937, in Wilsonville, Kentucky, in Boyle County. His family moved to Columbus, Ohio, when he was five, but he would spend summers in Wilsonville. He attended Columbus's East High School. He was on the football team that was twice undefeated, and was selected All-State, All-City, and a high school All-American.

== College career ==
Marshall played college football for the Ohio State Buckeyes (1957–1958). In 1958, he was named an All-American at tackle. He was also a track star at Ohio State University, setting school records at discus and shot put in 1958.

In 1957, the Buckeyes were 9–1 overall, 7–0 in the Big Ten Conference, and ended the season ranked second to Auburn in the Associated Press (AP) national poll, and ranked first by UPI and the Football Writers Association of American. Along with Marshall, the team included other future NFL players Jim Houston, Dick LeBeau, and Bill Jobko. Marshall played in the 1958 Rose Bowl (January 1, 1958), which the Buckeyes won 10–7 over Oregon.

The 1958 Buckeye team ended the season ranked 8th in the AP poll. In a November 1958 game against Purdue, Marshall had a 25-yard interception return for a touchdown, and a 22-yard return of a blocked punt for another touchdown; Ohio State's only two touchdowns in the game. Jim Houston had blocked the punt Marshall recovered, and deflected the pass Marshall intercepted.

In 1978, Marshall was inducted into the Ohio State Hall of Fame.

== Professional career ==
=== Canadian Football League ===
Marshall left school before his senior year, primarily for financial reasons, and played for the Saskatchewan Roughriders of the Canadian Football League (CFL) in 1959. The Roughriders had obtained Marshall's CFL rights from the Ottawa Rough Riders in April 1959. Marshall typically played defensive line, but was used on offense as well. In one game he caught a touchdown pass against the Winnipeg Blue Bombers, who were coached by Bud Grant, Marshall's future head coach on the Vikings. After one year, he was traded to the Cleveland Browns in an NFL–CFL transaction, being swapped for Bob Ptacek, who had played against Marshall in college at the University of Michigan. Cleveland's Paul Brown had selected Marshall in the fourth round of the 1960 NFL draft, obtaining the rights to sign him.

=== National Football League ===
Marshall played the 1960 season with the Browns. He contracted encephalitis during military training before the 1961 season, and was seriously ill, even being placed in an induced coma to save his life. He was traded along with five other players (including fellow defensive lineman Paul Dickson) to the expansion Minnesota Vikings in exchange for two draft picks in the 1962 NFL draft. He played from 1961 to 1979 with the Vikings and finished with a then-record 282 consecutive games played (since surpassed by punter Jeff Feagles). Marshall started 270 consecutive games while playing for the Vikings, an NFL record since surpassed by Brett Favre.

Marshall played in the Pro Bowl in 1968 and 1969. He recovered 30 fumbles during his career, an NFL record. He was a member of the Vikings' famous "Purple People Eaters" (which consisted of Marshall (DE), Alan Page (DT), Gary Larsen (DT), and Carl Eller (DE)), and was the final player from Minnesota's initial expansion team of 1961 to retire. Marshall had 127 career sacks as a Viking, second-most in team history behind Eller. At the time of his retirement in 1979, Marshall had played in every game in Vikings history. In his final Vikings home game, he had two sacks, and was awarded a game ball, the first ever awarded by longtime Vikings coach Bud Grant.

Marshall was one of 11 players to have played in all four of the Vikings' Super Bowl appearances in the 1970s.

== Legacy and Hall of Fame case ==
Marshall was a two-time Pro Bowl and three-time second-team All-Pro selection. His No. 70 was retired by the Vikings and he was inducted into their Ring of Honor. In 2004, Marshall was named to the Professional Football Researchers Association Hall of Very Good in the association's second HOVG class. Marshall was a finalist for the Pro Football Hall of Fame in 2004 but was not elected. In 2008, NFL Network named Marshall the second-best player not in the Hall of Fame on their NFL Top 10 program, behind only Green Bay Packers offensive lineman Jerry Kramer. Kramer would be inducted into the Hall of Fame in 2018. In 2023 and 2024, Marshall was listed as a semifinalist for the senior nominees but failed to advance to the final 12.

Additionally, despite his 2 Pro Bowl appearances and 3 2nd team All-Pro selections, Marshall accumulated more sacks than: Pro Bowl defensive ends in 12 seasons; 1st team All-Pro defensive ends in 5 seasons; 2nd team All-Pro defensive ends in 6 seasons. He also out sacked defensive ends named to the rival American Football League All-Pro and Pro Bowl teams in each of the 10 seasons the league existed.

Marshall was a Viking team captain 14 times which remains a team record. In 2024, the Vikings honored this achievement with the Jim Marshall Vikings Captains Legacy wall at TCO Performance Center.

Many of Marshall's teammates, coaches and opponents have spoken highly of his play and leadership. Bud Grant, not one to give undue praise, repeatedly lauded Marshall as the best he ever coached saying "He's the greatest Viking we ever had." In 1974, Norm Van Brocklin said Marshall "was the best football player I had at Minnesota". Ron Yary said "He made me into a better football player because I wanted to play for Jim, I didn't want to let him down." Fran Tarkenton said "Jim Marshall set the tone for how this franchise goes today".

His fellow Purple People Eater teammates have praised Jim as well. Alan Page said "If you looked in the dictionary and tried to find the definition of a football player, Jim Marshall's picture would be there." Carl Eller added "Jim, more than anything, inspiration all through my career." Gary Larsen put it most succinctly, "Captain Jim, everybody looked up to him."

Paul Wiggin, a fellow defensive end on the 1960 Browns and a longtime coach and scout added "I studied 30 great linemen at that time, both inside and outside players, and at the end of that Jim Marshall, in my opinion, was the most natural and best football player of all of them." Wiggin also touched on Bud Grants admiration for Jim, saying "if Bud Grant thinks that much of you, you probably belong in the Hall of Fame."

Gale Sayers, Hall of Fame running back for the Chicago Bears, told NFL Films "He was just as Good as Carl Eller. No question about it." In 1999, Jim Langer, Hall of Fame Miami Dolphins center, wrote a letter to a fan where he said "Jim Marshall is truly one of the great players in NFL history." NFL Films co-founder Steve Sabol said "No player in the history of the game ever played harder, longer than Jim Marshall.

As of 2026, Marshall has yet to be inducted into the Pro Football Hall of Fame.

== Wrong way run ==
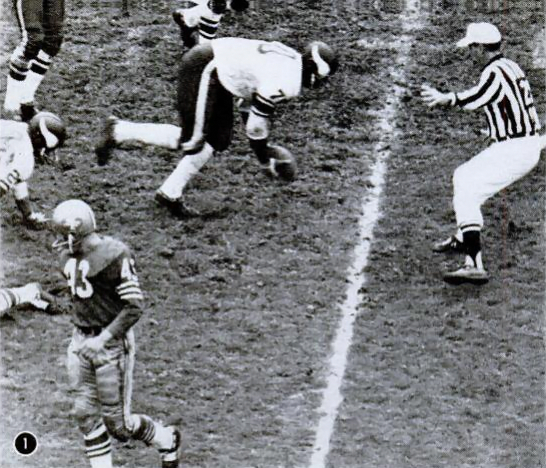
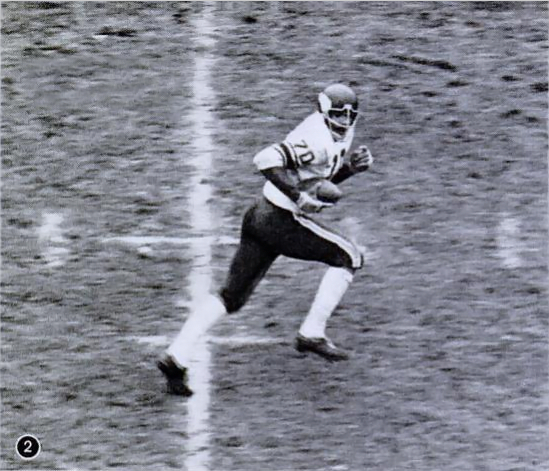
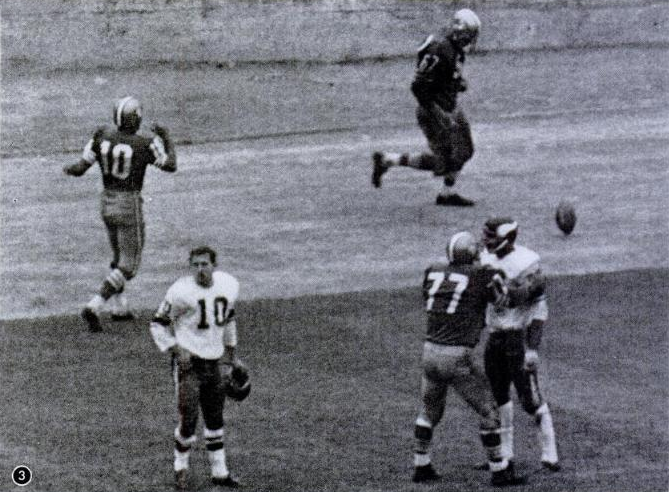
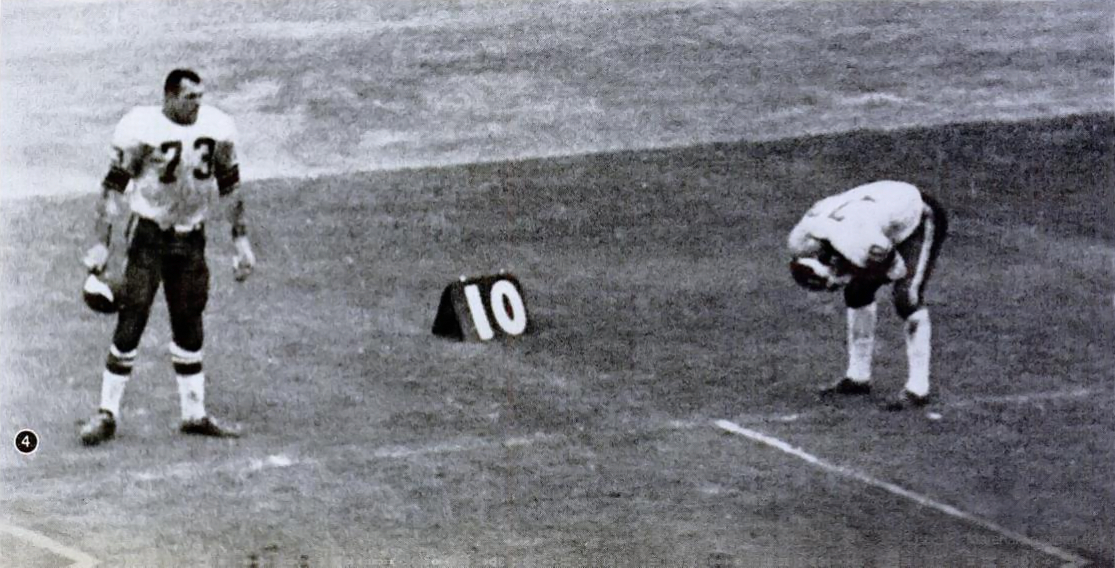
Marshall recovers the fumble (1), before running in the wrong direction (2). In the aftermath of the 49ers' safety, opposing tackle Bruce Bosley (No. 77) congratulates Marshall on the play, (3) as he quickly realizes what has happened. (4)

Marshall ran in the wrong direction with Minnesota against the San Francisco 49ers on October 25, 1964. After recovering an offensive fumble, he ran 66 yards the wrong way into his team's own end zone. After completing the run, thinking that he had scored a touchdown for the Vikings, Marshall then pitched the ball in celebration, and the ball landed out of bounds, resulting in a safety for the 49ers. Marshall did not realize what he had done until 49ers lineman Bruce Bosley thanked him, and teammate Fran Tarkenton, who was on the near sideline, followed by telling Marshall what he had done. According to Marshall, when he approached Vikings head coach Norm Van Brocklin after the play, all Van Brocklin said was, "Well Jim, you've done the most interesting thing in this game today." Despite the gaffe, the Vikings won the game 27–22. This was largely thanks to Marshall sacking 49ers quarterback George Mira and forcing a fumble, which was recovered by Carl Eller, who ran 45 yards for a touchdown.

Marshall later received a letter from Roy Riegels, who had made a wrong way run in the 1929 Rose Bowl, stating, "Welcome to the club." In 2019, Marshall's miscue was ranked No. 54 among the NFL's 100 Greatest Plays.

== NFL records ==
=== Active ===
- Most seasons played by a defensive player: 20
- Most complete seasons played by a defensive player: 20
- Most consecutive games started, including playoffs, by a defensive player: 289
- Most consecutive regular-season games played by a defensive player: 282
- Most consecutive regular-season starts played by a defensive player: 270
- Most consecutive regular-season starts played with one team: 270
- Most opponent fumbles recovered: 29 (tied by Jason Taylor)
- Most fumble recoveries by a defensive end: 30
- Most yardage lost on a fumble recovery: 66

=== Former ===
- Most consecutive regular-season games played: 282 (broken by Jeff Feagles, 2005)
- Most consecutive regular-season games started: 270 (broken by Brett Favre, 2009)

== Personal life ==
Marshall resided in St. Louis Park, Minnesota. He was married twice: firstly to Anita, with whom he had two daughters, and then a second time, to Susan. In September 2009, when quarterback Brett Favre was set to surpass Marshall's record of consecutive games started, he could not attend the game as it coincided with his wedding anniversary. A few days later, Marshall visited the Vikings' practice facilities to congratulate Favre in person.

After his retirement from professional football, Marshall was involved in the financial services industry, real estate, and insurance. He was also involved with foundations serving the needs of homeless and unemployed youth.

Marshall was well known for his off the field, danger seeking exploits. He admitted to having "jumped out of airplanes 2,067 times" Marshall survived a hang-gliding crash in August 1980 that resulted in a broken leg, a broken arm, and a three-and-a-half-hour surgery.

The most dangerous of his exploits came in early 1971 when Marshall, teammate Paul Dickson, Minnesota sportswriter Jim Klobuchar, and 13 others went on a snowmobile run through the Beartooth Mountains of Wyoming and Montana. A wind storm caused the snowmobiles to freeze up. The group was split up into three smaller parties with Marshall and Dickson having to burn the cash in their wallets to stay warm in the sub-zero-degree weather. Marshall was convicted of possession of cocaine in 1991 and received four years of probation. He was granted a pardon in 2007.

Marshall died in Minneapolis, Minnesota on June 3, 2025, at the age of 87, following a period of hospitalization.

== See also ==
- Iron man
- Own goal
