= Purple People Eaters =

1960s and 1970s NFL defensive line for the Minnesota Vikings

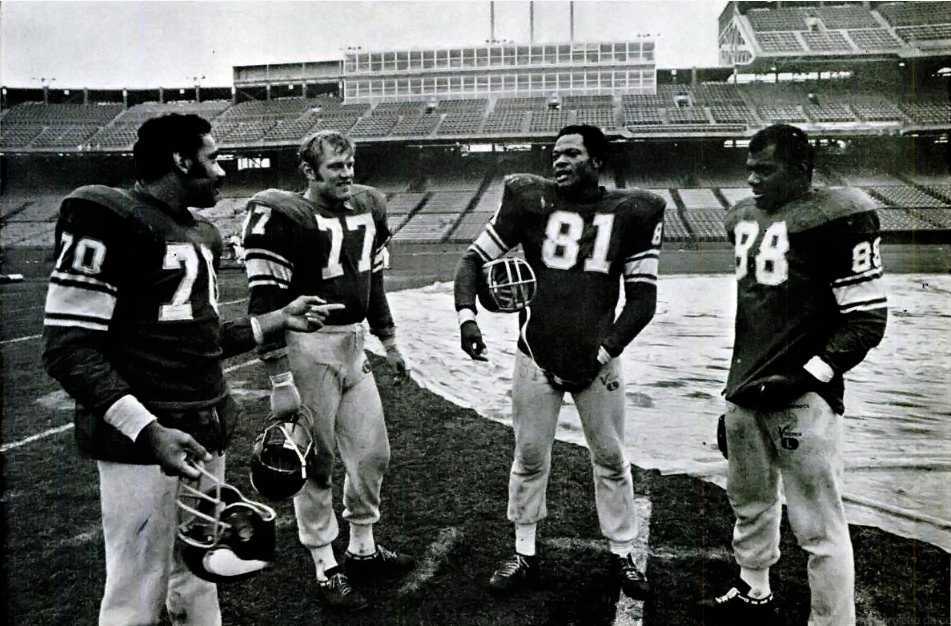
The Purple People Eaters in January 1970 at Metropolitan Stadium. From left to right: Marshall, Larsen, Eller, and Page.

The Purple People Eaters was the nickname given to the defensive line of the Minnesota Vikings from 1967 to 1977, consisting mainly of Alan Page, Carl Eller, Jim Marshall, and Gary Larsen.

The term is a reference to a popular song from 1958, the efficiency of the defense, and the color of their uniforms. The motto of the Purple People Eaters was "Meet at the quarterback."

The Purple People Eaters mainly consisted of:

- Defensive tackle Alan Page, 9 Pro Bowl selections (1968–1976), NFL MVP (1971), Pro Football Hall of Fame
- Defensive end Carl Eller, 6 Pro Bowl selections (1968–1971, 1973–1974), Pro Football Hall of Fame
- Defensive end Jim Marshall, 2 Pro Bowl selections (1968–1969)
- Defensive tackle Gary Larsen, 2 Pro Bowl selections (1969–1970)

Larsen was replaced in 1974 by Doug Sutherland.

Marshall said that the players disliked the name "Purple People Eaters" and called themselves "The Purple Gang", but "we've got to ride with it because it's our handle". The group was a major factor in the post-season success of the Vikings from the late 1960s through the 1970s. The Purple People Eaters were one of the most identifiable front fours in National Football League history, with the "Fearsome Foursome" of the Los Angeles Rams during the 1960s and early 1970s, the "Steel Curtain" of the Pittsburgh Steelers during the 1970s, the "New York Sack Exchange" of the New York Jets during the 1980s, and the “Monsters of the Midway" of the Chicago Bears during the 1980s.

Eller and Page were inducted into the Pro Football Hall of Fame. Many people argue that Jim Marshall should be in the Hall of Fame as well.

== Building the Purple People Eaters ==
When the Minnesota Vikings first came into the NFL in 1961, they picked up Jim Marshall from the Cleveland Browns during a number of early September trades that moved six Cleveland players to the Vikings for two 1962 draft picks. In 1964, Carl Eller was drafted in the first round. In the next season, they acquired Gary Larsen from the Los Angeles Rams. Then in 1967, the Vikings drafted Alan Page in the first round.

== Late 1960s and early 1970s ==
The Purple People Eaters were a key part of a Vikings team that won 10 division titles in 11 years, leading to five NFC Championships and four Super Bowl appearances.

In 1968, Marshall, Eller and Page all made the Pro Bowl as the defense collected 44 sacks (11 for Page, 10 for Larsen, 10 for Marshall and 8 for Eller), and ranked 6th in the league in points allowed as the Vikings won their first division title. In week 2 against the Green Bay Packers, Marshall sacked Packers Quarterback Bart Starr in his own end zone for a safety en route to a 26-13 victory.

In 1969, the Vikings ranked number one in both total yards and points allowed. This included two shutouts and the final seven game stretch where they only allowed 2 offensive touchdowns. Marshall, Eller, Page and Larsen all made the Pro Bowl as the defense sacked the opposing quarterback 49 times with Eller leading the league with 15, and Marshall second in the league with 14.

On Thanksgiving against the Detroit Lions during a driving snowstorm, Marshall and Page combined for one of the most remarkable plays in NFL history. Page tipped a pass which was intercepted by Marshall, who ran for 30 yards, then lateraled it as he was being tackled to Page who then ran 15 yards for a touchdown. The Vikings won the game 27–0.

In the Western Conference championship game, the Vikings hosted the Los Angeles Rams. Late in the fourth quarter, protecting a one-point lead, Eller sacked Rams quarterback Roman Gabriel in the end zone for a safety to make it 23-20. On the Rams next drive, Page intercepted Gabriel to clinch a 23-20 win.

The win allowed the Vikings to advance to their first-ever NFL Championship where they defeated the Cleveland Browns 27–7 before losing in an 23-7 upset to the Kansas City Chiefs in Super Bowl IV.

In 1970, the Vikings once again ranked number one in total yards and points allowed, with two shutouts and allowing only 2 offensive touchdowns in the first 6 games of the season, while scoring 3 defensive touchdowns of their own. That year Eller, Page and Larsen made the pro bowl as the Vikings collected 49 sacks. Page also led the league with seven fumble recoveries for 77 yards and a touchdown. His touchdown came in a week 4 game against the Chicago Bears. All four down linemen got to Bears quarterback Jack Concannon, Larsen & Eller forced a fumble which was recovered by Page who returned it 65 yards for a touchdown. The next week, Page also picked off Dallas Cowboys quarterback Roger Staubach and returned it 27 yards.

In week one against the Chiefs, the Vikings defense limited the Chiefs to 63 yards rushing and forced four turnovers. One included a second quarter fumble forced by Eller, recovered by Marshall who then lateraled the ball to Roy Winston, who went on to score a touchdown as the Vikings avenged their Super Bowl loss with a decisive 27–10 victory.

Late in the first half in a week 6 game against the Los Angeles Rams, The Vikings defense executed a key goal line stand by keeping the rams out of the endzone on three straight running plays.

In 1971, The Vikings defense fell to number two in fewest yards allowed but for the third year in a row, ranked number one in fewest points allowed. This included 3 shutouts. That year, Eller was voted NEA NFL Defensive Player of the Year and to his fourth straight first team All-Pro selection. Meanwhile, Page became the first defensive player to be voted NFL MVP, and the only defensive lineman to ever earn the honor. Page's MVP season was highlighted by his Week 13 performance against the Detroit Lions. In the second quarter, after being called for a personal foul and for roughing the passer on consecutive plays, Page sacked QB Greg Landry on first down. On second down, Page tackled Altie Taylor for a 4-yard loss. On third down, Page tackled Landry after a gain of two yards, ending the drive. In the fourth quarter, Page blocked a Lion punt out of the end zone for a safety.

Page would score 2 other safeties that year. One in week 3 when he sacked Buffalo Bills quarterback Dennis Shaw in his own end zone, and in the Divisional Playoff game against the Cowboys by sacking Staubach in his own end zone.

== Three Super Bowls in four years ==
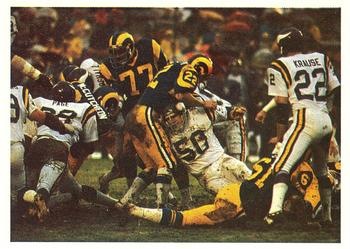
The Vikings' Purple People Eaters defensive line stopping a Rams rushing play in the 1977 NFC Divisional Playoff game.

With the Vikings intimidating line leading their defense and their future Hall of Fame quarterback Fran Tarkenton leading the offense, the Vikings went on to participate in Super Bowls VIII, IX, and XI, though the Vikings lost each one. Also from 1973-1976, while they didn’t reclaim the number one spot in scoring defense, they remained in the top three.

In 1973, Eller became an All Pro for the fifth time in six years. Page meanwhile was named NEA Defensive Player of the Year as the Vikings ranked second in the league in points allowed.

In the NFC Championship, The Vikings limited Dallas to 153 yards of total offense, sacked Staubach 3 times and forced 6 turnovers including two fumble recoveries by Gary Larsen en route to a 27–10 victory and the Vikings returned to the Super Bowl for the second time in five years.

In 1974, the Vikings ranked third in points allowed. That year Doug Sutherland started in place of Larsen (who was playing his last season) and continued for the next seven years.

The Vikings defense played major roles throughout their playoff run. A turning point in the Divisional round against the St. Louis Cardinals came in the third quarter when Page and Eller forced a fumble which was recovered and scored by defensive back Nate Wright. From there the Vikings scored 23 unanswered points en route to winning 30–14.

Then in the NFC Championship against the Rams, two back-to-back sacks ended a crucial drive for the Rams. First Eller and Sutherland combined for a sack. Then Marshall, Page and Bob Lurtsema combined for the sack as the Vikings held on to win 14-10 and advance to Super Bowl IX, a 16–6 loss to the Pittsburgh Steelers and their fabled Steel Curtain defense.

In 1975, Page made his eighth consecutive Pro Bowl as the Vikings' defense recorded 46 sacks, ranked third in the league in points allowed. The Vikings also became the first defense since the 1970 merger to be ranked number one against both the run and the pass en route to winning another division title.

In 1976, The Vikings defense ranked second in points allowed, won another divisional title and made it to their third Super Bowl in four years (fourth overall). That year, Page accounted for 18 of the Vikings 45 sacks and made his 9th consecutive Pro Bowl.

In 1977, The Vikings won yet another division title and made it to their fourth NFC Championship in five years. That year, Eller accounted for 15 of the Vikings 30 sacks. Eller also recorded a safety in week 2 against the Tampa Bay Buccaneers when he sacked Buccaneers quarterback Randy Hedberg in his own endzone en route to a 9–3 victory.

== Retirement ==
Alan Page played for the Vikings until 1978 where six games in he was waived and then signed by the Chicago Bears, who he played for until he retired after the 1981 season. As a Bear, Page collected 40 sacks. He was voted into the Pro Football Hall of Fame in 1988. After retirement Page became an attorney until 1992, when he was elected to the Minnesota Supreme Court, the first African-American to do so. He was re-elected 3 more times until his retirement in 2015 when turned 70, reaching the mandatory retirement age. In 2018 he was awarded the Presidential Medal of Freedom.

Carl Eller also played with the Vikings until 1978, and one more season with the Seattle Seahawks before retiring after the 1979 season. He was inducted into the Pro Football Hall of Fame in 2004. About a decade later Eller went on to found various substance-abuse clinics in the Twin Cities area, named Triumph Life Centers. He acquired a degree in Human Services from Metropolitan State University in 1994. In 2020 Eller partnered with Halberd Corporation in work related to impact caused brain injuries such as PTSD and CTE.

Jim Marshall retired after the 1979 season with the Vikings, completing his 20th season. Marshall never missed a game, setting a NFL record with 282 consecutive games (most by defensive player). Marshall was a finalist for the Pro Football Hall of Fame in 2004. In his last home game against the Buffalo Bills, Marshall collected two sacks and was carried off the field by his teammates in celebration. The Vikings won the game 10–3.

Gary Larsen retired in 1974 after 10 seasons with the Vikings.

Doug Sutherland remained with the Vikings until 1981 when he (like Eller) spent his last season with the Seahawks before retiring.

Along with Page and Eller being inducted to the Hall of Fame, the Purple People Eaters received several franchise accolades. Marshall, Eller, and Page have been inducted the Vikings Ring of Honor, The Vikings retired numbers 88 and 70 to Page and Marshall respectively, Eller, Larsen, Page, and Marshall were selected to the Vikings 25th Anniversary team, Eller, Page and Marshall were selected to the Vikings 40th Anniversary team, and Eller, Larsen, Page, Marshall, and Sutherland were selected to be part of the 50 Greatest Vikings.

Marshall died on June 3, 2025.
