= Carl Eller =

American football player (born 1942)

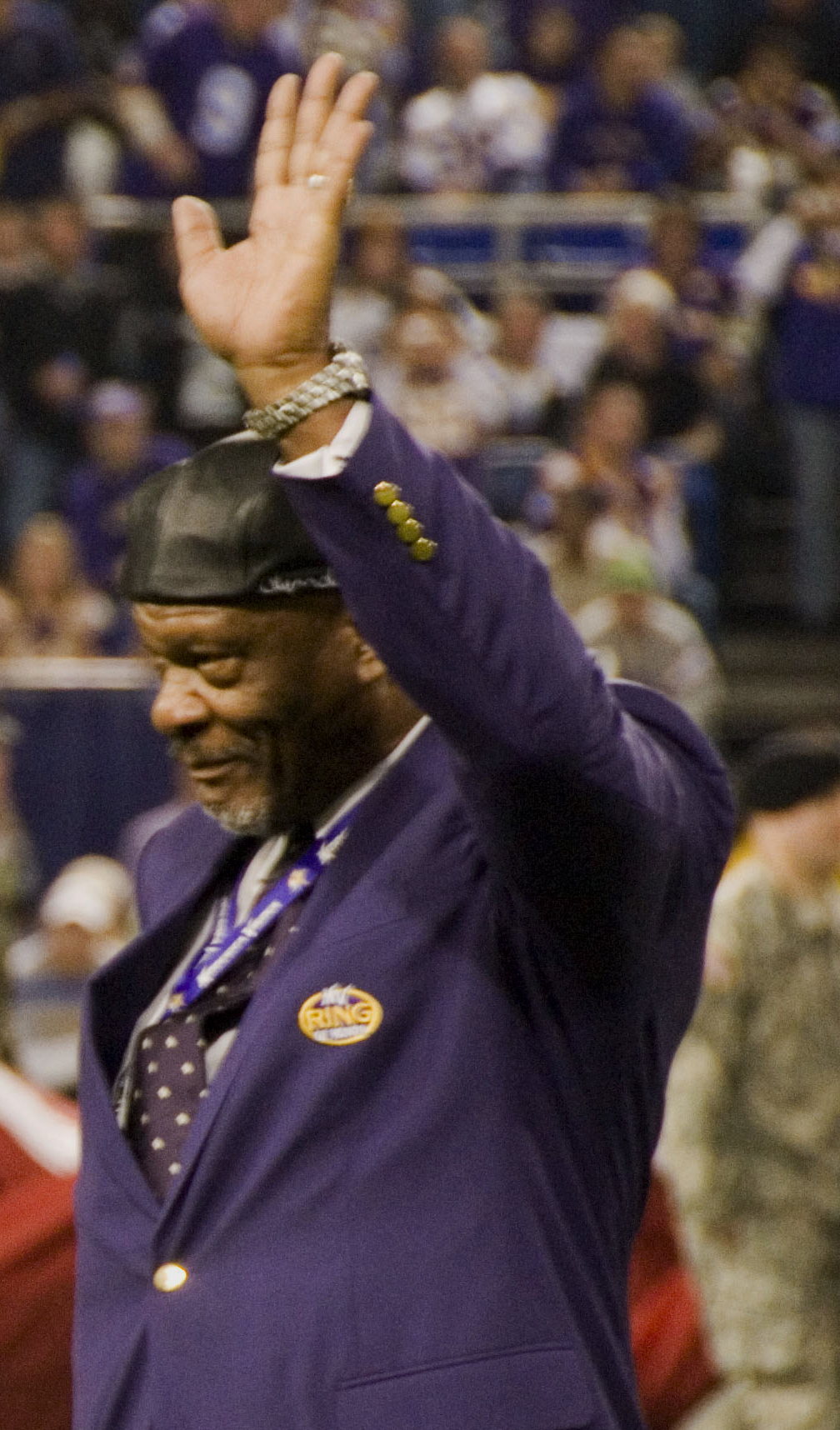
- Eller in 2007

No. 81, 71
- Position: Defensive end

Personal information
- Born: January 25, 1942 (age 84); Winston-Salem, North Carolina, U.S.
- Listed height: 6 ft 6 in (1.98 m)
- Listed weight: 247 lb (112 kg)

Career information
- High school: Atkins (Winston-Salem)
- College: Minnesota (1961–1963)
- NFL draft: 1964: 1st round, 6th overall pick
- AFL draft: 1964: 1st round, 5th overall pick

Career history
- Minnesota Vikings (1964–1978); Seattle Seahawks (1979)

Awards and highlights
- NFL champion (1969); NEA NFL Defensive Player of the Year (1971); 5× First-team All-Pro (1968–1971, 1973); 2× Second-team All-Pro (1967, 1972); 6× Pro Bowl (1968–1971, 1973, 1974); NFL sacks co-leader (1969); NFL 1970s All-Decade Team; Minnesota Vikings Ring of Honor; 50 Greatest Vikings; Minnesota Vikings 25th Anniversary Team; Minnesota Vikings 40th Anniversary Team; National champion (1960); Consensus All-American (1963); First-team All-Big Ten (1963); Second-team All-Big Ten (1962); Rose Bowl champion (1961)

Career NFL statistics
- Sacks: 133.5
- Safeties: 2
- Interceptions: 1
- Fumble recoveries: 23
- Defensive touchdowns: 1
- Stats at Pro Football Reference
- Pro Football Hall of Fame
- College Football Hall of Fame

Carl Lee Eller (born January 25, 1942) is an American former professional football player who played as a defensive end in the National Football League (NFL) from 1964 through 1979. He was born in Winston-Salem, North Carolina and played college football for the Minnesota Golden Gophers. He was elected to the Pro Football Hall of Fame in 2004.

== Early life ==
Eller was born on January 25, 1942, in Winston-Salem, North Carolina. Eller's family was poor, and his father died when Eller was young. Early in his Professional Football Hall of Fame acceptance speech, Eller acknowledges how great his parents were in his life.

He attended Atkins High School, where he excelled in football, and was inspired and given direction by his high school football coaches. His team won the 1959 state football championship. One of his championship teammates was future NBA player Happy Hairston. He was also on the track team, in discus and shot put.

He got the nickname "Moose" while playing sandlot football around the same time.

== College career ==
He was recruited to the University of Minnesota by head coach Murray Warmath, on the recommendation of Bobby Bell, a fellow North Carolina high school player, from Shelby. Eller played defensive tackle from 1961 to 1963, and began starting in his sophomore year (1961), playing with a broken hand that year. In 1961 and 1962, Eller played tackle alongside Bell, a future NFL Hall of Fame linebacker and the 1962 Outland Trophy winner.

As a sophomore, on January 1, 1962, Eller starred in helping lead the Golden Gophers to a 21–3 Rose Bowl victory over UCLA. Eller played both offensive left tackle and defensive tackle in the game, throwing key blocks as an offensive lineman during the game. The team had been divided on whether to go back to the Rose Bowl, after losing the game one year earlier, but quarterback Sandy Stevens convinced the team they should go for Eller's sake, as he might never have another opportunity to play in the game. In 1972, a group of writers and Rose Bowl experts included Eller at defensive tackle on their 50-year Rose Bowl team.

While Eller shared the starting position at offensive tackle as a sophomore, he became a full-time, two-way player as a junior and senior and was voted All-American in 1962 and 1963.

The 1962 Naval Academy team included Eller on its all-opponent team. As a junior in 1962, he was second team All-Big Ten, and the following year Eller was a consensus All-American and first team All-Big Ten. In 1963, he also won the school's Bronko Nagurski Award as the team's most valuable player. As a senior (1963), Eller was the runner-up for the Outland Trophy.

During his freshman year in college, the 1960 Gophers were National Champions and Big Ten Champions, losing in the Rose Bowl; though Eller did not play on that team. Minnesota was a losing team in the immediate prior seasons, and coach Warmath had decided to field a racially and geographically diverse team. Eller, who was on the 1960 freshman team, believed and emphasized that the ultimately successful Minnesota teams during that era were “'a major, major factor in the [Black] freedom movement.'"

At the University of Minnesota, Eller joined the Mu chapter of the Alpha Phi Alpha fraternity.

== Professional career ==
In 1964, Eller was selected in the first round of the NFL draft by the Minnesota Vikings (6th overall). He was also selected in the first round of the American Football League draft by the Buffalo Bills (5th overall), who could not sign him. As the left defensive end in the Vikings front four, he was a major factor in the unit known as the "Purple People Eaters" (the other members being Alan Page, Jim Marshall and Gary Larsen).

Starting in 1968, Eller's fifth campaign, Minnesota won 10 Central Division titles in the next 11 seasons. The Vikings won the NFL Championship in 1969, losing to the AFL Champion Kansas City Chiefs in Super Bowl IV. The Vikings also won the NFC Championships in 1973, 1974, and 1976, but lost in the Super Bowl each year. Eller was one of 11 Vikings to play in all four of their Super Bowls.

He was selected to play in six Pro Bowls (1968–1971, 1973, and 1974). After being traded with an eighth-round pick to Seattle Seahawks for defensive tackle Steve Niehaus, Eller played his final season in 1979 with the Seattle Seahawks, where he ran his career total to 225 games. In his career, "Moose" only missed three games and started 209 out of the 225 he played.

Eller is credited as the Vikings' all-time sack leader with 130½. He also had 3 sacks with the Seahawks in 1979 for a career total of 133½. He set a career high with 15 sacks in 1969 and matched that total in 1977; he also amassed 7 seasons with 10 or more sacks. He recovered 23 fumbles during his career.

Eller was first-team All-NFL from 1968 to 1971, and again in 1973. He was also second-team All-Pro in 1967 and 1972 and was named first-team All-NFC by the AP, UPI, and The Sporting News in 1975. Including his Pro Bowls, Eller had a nine-year consecutive streak of post-season honors which began in 1967 with his second-team All-Pro selection and ended in 1975 with his All-NFC honors. He was named to the Pro Football Hall of Fame 1970s All-Decade Team.

He was voted the winner of the George Halas Trophy in 1971 as the NFL's Defensive Player of the Year as awarded by the Newspaper Enterprise Association.

== Honors and awards ==
In 2004, Eller was elected to the Pro Football Hall of Fame. He was elected to the College Football Hall of Fame in 2006. In 2000, Eller was named to the Vikings' 40th Anniversary Team and in 2010, he was named to the Vikings' 50th Anniversary team. Beginning in 1984, following each football season, the Carl Eller Award is given to the University of Minnesota's Defensive Player of the Year. In 1992, he was inducted into the University of Minnesota's M Club Hall of Fame.

In 2003, he was named to the Professional Football Researchers Association Hall of Very Good in the association's inaugural HOVG class.

== Life after football ==
As a licensed drug and alcohol counselor, Eller founded a group of substance-abuse clinics in the Twin Cities called Triumph Life Centers in 1986. He obtained a college degree in Human Services from Metropolitan State University in 1994 and went on to work for the Minnesota Department of Human Services, addressing issues of health disparities between white people and people of color.

Eller was arrested in 2006 for driving under the influence and pleaded guilty. He was arrested in 2008 for fourth-degree assault of a police officer and second-degree refusal to submit to chemical testing, both gross misdemeanors. He was sentenced and served 60 days in the county workhouse.

Eller later served as president of the NFL Retired Players Association. In 2020, he joined the Halberd Corporation, a research-based publicly traded company that helps discover and develop medical treatments for diseases, as a consultant.
