= 2000 Indianapolis Colts season =

48th season in franchise history

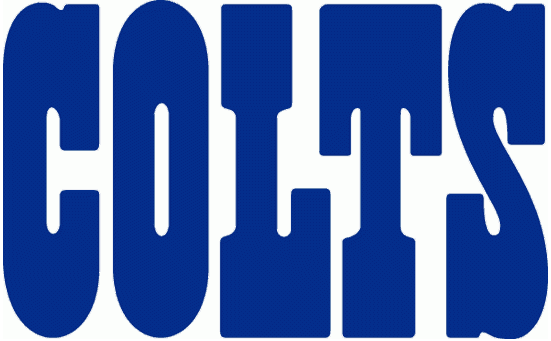
- Owner: Jim Irsay
- General manager: Bill Polian
- Head coach: Jim Mora
- Offensive coordinator: Tom Moore
- Defensive coordinator: Vic Fangio
- Home stadium: RCA Dome

Results
- Record: 10–6
- Division place: 2nd AFC East
- Playoffs: Lost Wild Card Playoffs (at Dolphins) 17–23 (OT)
- Pro Bowlers: QB Peyton Manning; RB Edgerrin James; WR Marvin Harrison

The 2000 season was the Indianapolis Colts' 48th in the National Football League (NFL) and their 17th in Indianapolis. They finished second in the AFC East with a 10–6 record, but lost in overtime to their division rival Miami Dolphins in the wildcard round of the playoffs.

As in the previous season, the Colts once again sent Peyton Manning, Edgerrin James and Marvin Harrison to the Pro Bowl at the end of the season.

== Offseason ==
Additions	Subtractions
RB Abdul-Karim al-Jabbar (Browns)	TE/LS Bradford Banta (Jets)
DT Bernard Holsey (Giants)	LB Bertrand Berry (Eskimos)
LB Dwight Hollier (Dolphins)	DT Tony McCoy (Cardinals)

=== NFL draft ===
2000 Indianapolis Colts draft
Round	Pick	Player	Position	College	Notes
1	28	Rob Morris	LB	BYU	
2	59	Marcus Washington	LB	Auburn	
3	91	David Macklin	CB	Penn State	
4	122	Josh Williams	DT	Michigan	
5	138	Matt Johnson	C	BYU	
7	235	Rob Renes	DT	Michigan	
7	238	Rodregis Brooks	CB	UAB	
Made roster † Pro Football Hall of Fame * Made at least one Pro Bowl during career

=== Undrafted free agents ===
2000 undrafted free agents of note
Player	Position	College
John Baker	Punter	North Texas
Mike Furrey	Wide Receiver	Northern Iowa
Steve Gleason	Safety	Washington State
Trevor Insley	Wide Receiver	Nevada
Kevin McDougal	Running Back	Colorado State
John Mlerandi	Center	Notre Dame
Ike Ried	Linebacker	Ohio Western
Justin Snow	Long snapper	Baylor
Brian Wofford	Wide Receiver	Clemson

== Personnel ==
=== Staff ===
2000 Indianapolis Colts staff
Front office: Owner and chief executive officer – Jim Irsay; President – Bill Polian; Director of football operations – Dom Anile; Director of pro player personnel – Clyde Powers; Director of player development – Steve Champlin; Coordinator of player personnel – John Becker; Director of pro scouting – Chris Polian; Director of college scouting – Mike Butler; Head coaches: Head coach – Jim E. Mora; Assistant head coach/defensive backs – George Catavolos; Offensive coaches: Offensive coordinator – Tom Moore; Quarterbacks – Bruce Arians; Running backs – Gene Huey; Receivers – Jay Norvell; Tight ends – Tony Marciano; Offensive line – Howard Mudd	Defensive coaches: Defensive coordinator – Vic Fangio; Defensive line – Todd Grantham; Linebackers – Mike Murphy; Defensive assistant – John Pagano; Special teams coaches: Special teams – Kevin Spencer; Strength and conditioning: Strength and conditioning – Jon Torine; Assistant strength and conditioning – Richard Howell

=== Roster ===
2000 Indianapolis Colts roster
Quarterbacks (QB): 9 Billy Joe Hobert; 13 Kelly Holcomb; 18 Peyton Manning; Running backs (RB): 30 Lennox Gordon; 36 Jim Finn FB; 32 Edgerrin James; 39 Paul Shields FB; Wide receivers (WR): 84 E. G. Green; 88 Marvin Harrison; 86 Jerome Pathon KR; 80 Terrence Wilkins; Tight ends (TE): 85 Ken Dilger; 83 Josh Keur; 81 Marcus Pollard	Offensive linemen (OL): 54 Phil Armour C; 78 Tarik Glenn T; 69 Ben Gilbert G; 74 Waverly Jackson G; 73 Adam Meadows T; 76 Steve McKinney G; 50 Larry Moore G; 63 Jeff Saturday C; Defensive linemen (DL): 93 Lionel Barnes DE; 92 Chad Bratzke DE; 64 Larry Chester DT; 79 Bernard Holsey DE; 62 Ellis Johnson DT; 65 Brandon Miller DT; 91 Chukie Nwokorie DE; 99 Brad Scioli DE; 90 Mark Thomas DE; 95 Bernard Whittington DT; 96 Josh Williams DT	Linebackers (LB): 97 Cornelius Bennett OLB; 51 Phil Glover MLB; 56 Dwight Hollier MLB; 52 Mike Peterson OLB; 98 Sam Sword MLB; 55 Ratcliff Thomas OLB; 53 Marcus Washington OLB; Defensive backs (DB): 47 Billy Austin FS; 29 Jason Belser FS; 26 Tony Blevins CB/S; 20 Jeff Burris CB; 37 Chad Cota SS; 31 Clifton Crosby CB; 27 David Macklin CB; 21 Mustafah Muhammad CB; 38 Tyrone Poole CB; Special teams (ST): 17 Hunter Smith P; 48 Justin Snow LS; 12 Mike Vanderjagt K	Practice squad: 23 Derek Fox S; 59 Josh Gentry LB; 10 Drew Haddad WR; 15 Isaac Jones WR; 72 Tim Ridder T; Reserve: 42 Rodregis Brooks CB (IR); 1 Trevor Insley WR (IR); -- Shawn King DE (Susp.); 43 Kevin McDougal RB (IR); 94 Rob Morris LB (IR); 61 Rob Renes DT (IR); Rookies in italics 52 active, 6 reserve, 5 practice squad

== Preseason ==
Week	Date	Opponent	Result	Record	Venue	Recap
1	July 29	Atlanta Falcons	L 13–20	0–1	RCA Dome	Recap
2	August 5	at Seattle Seahawks	L 16–28	0–2	Husky Stadium	Recap
3	August 12	New Orleans Saints	W 17–0	1–2	Ross–Ade Stadium (West Lafayette)	Recap
4	August 19	vs. Pittsburgh Steelers	W 24–23	2–2	Estadio Azteca (Mexico City)	Recap
5	August 24	Minnesota Vikings	W 32–30	3–2	RCA Dome	Recap

== Regular season ==
=== Schedule ===
Week	Date	Opponent	Result	Record	Venue	Attendance
1	September 3	at Kansas City Chiefs	**W** 27–14	1–0	Arrowhead Stadium	78,357
2	September 10	Oakland Raiders	**L** 31–38	1–1	RCA Dome	56,769
3	Bye					
4	September 25	Jacksonville Jaguars	**W** 43–14	2–1	RCA Dome	56,816
5	October 1	at **Buffalo Bills**	**W** 18–16	3–1	Ralph Wilson Stadium	72,617
6	October 8	at **New England Patriots**	**L** 16–24	3–2	Foxboro Stadium	60,292
7	October 15	at Seattle Seahawks	**W** 37–24	4–2	Husky Stadium	63,593
8	October 22	**New England Patriots**	**W** 30–23	5–2	RCA Dome	56,828
9	October 29	Detroit Lions	**W** 30–18	6–2	RCA Dome	56,971
10	November 5	at Chicago Bears	**L** 24–27	6–3	Soldier Field	66,944
11	November 12	**New York Jets**	**W** 23–15	7–3	RCA Dome	56,657
12	November 19	at Green Bay Packers	**L** 24–26	7–4	Lambeau Field	59,869
13	November 26	**Miami Dolphins**	**L** 14–17	7–5	RCA Dome	56,935
14	December 3	at **New York Jets**	**L** 17–27	7–6	Giants Stadium	78,138
15	December 11	**Buffalo Bills**	**W** 44–20	8–6	RCA Dome	56,671
16	December 17	at **Miami Dolphins**	**W** 20–13	9–6	Pro Player Stadium	73,884
17	December 24	Minnesota Vikings	**W** 31–10	10–6	RCA Dome	56,672
Note: Intra-division opponents are in **bold** text.

=== Game summaries ===
==== Week 1: at Kansas City Chiefs ====
Week 1: Indianapolis Colts at Kansas City Chiefs

Quarter	1	2	3	4	Total
**Colts**	0	7	7	13	**27**
Chiefs	0	7	7	0	**14**

at Arrowhead Stadium, Kansas City, Missouri

- Date: September 3
- Game time: 1:00 p.m. EST
- Game weather: 90 °F or 32.2 °C; relative humidity 50%, wind 5 miles per hour (8.0 km/h; 4.3 kn)
- Game attendance: 78,357
- Referee: Larry Nemmers
- TV announcers (CBS): Verne Lundquist, Dan Dierdorf, and Bonnie Bernstein

Game information

**First quarter**

- No scoring plays

**Second quarter**

- IND — James 1-yard run (Vanderjagt kick), 14:15. Colts 7–0
- KC — Richardson 11-yard pass from Grbac (Stoyanovich kick), 5:23. 7–7

**Third quarter**

- IND — James 27-yard pass from Manning (Vanderjagt kick), 8:23. Colts 14–7
- KC — Alexander 21-yard pass from Grbac (Stoyanovich kick), 4:25. 14–14

**Fourth quarter**

- IND — Vanderjagt 23-yard field goal, 13:37. Colts 17–14
- IND — Burris 27-yard interception return (Vanderjagt kick), 12:38. Colts 24–14
- IND — Vanderjagt 40-yard field goal, 4:01. Colts 27–14

**Top passers**

- IND — Peyton Manning, 22/32, 273 yards, TD, INT
- KC — Elvis Grbac, 16/37, 212 yards, 2 TD, INT

**Top rushers**

- IND — Edgerrin James, 28 rushes, 124 yards, TD
- KC — Tony Richardson, 13 rushes, 58 yards

**Top receivers**

- IND — Marvin Harrison, 9 receptions, 115 yards
- KC — Sylvester Morris, 3 receptions, 58 yards

==== Week 2: vs. Oakland Raiders ====
Week 2: Oakland Raiders (1–0) at Indianapolis Colts (1–0)

Quarter	1	2	3	4	Total
Raiders	0	7	24	7	**38**
Colts	14	10	0	7	**31**

at RCA Dome

- Game time: 1:00 p.m. EST
- Game weather: Dome
- Game attendance: 56,769
- TV announcers (CBS): Greg Gumbel, Todd Blackledge, and Armen Keteyian

Game information

**First quarter**

- IND — Pollard 13-yard pass from Manning (Vanderjagt kick), 10:17. Colts 7–0
- IND — James 6-yard rush (Vanderjagt kick), 4:57. Colts 14–0

**Second quarter**

- IND — James 10-yard pass from Manning (Vanderjagt kick), 11:28. Colts 21–0
- OAK — Gannon 3-yard rush (Janikowski kick), 2:51. Colts 21–7
- IND — Mike Vanderjagt 31-yard field goal, 0:03. Colts 24–7

**Third quarter**

- OAK — Gannon 7-yard rush (Janikowski kick), 10:56. Colts 24–14
- OAK — Janikowski 24-yard field goal, 7:30. Colts 24–17
- OAK — Gannon 6-yard rush (Janikowski kick), 3:58. 24–24
- OAK — Wheatley 6-yard rush (Janikowski kick), 0:41. Raiders 31—24

**Fourth quarter**

- OAK — Wheatley 1-yard rush (Janikowski kick), 5:39. Raiders 38–24
- IND — Harrison 50-yard pass from Manning (Vanderjagt kick), 4:07. Raiders 38–31

**Top passers**

- OAK — Rich Gannon, 15/22, 207 yards
- IND — Peyton Manning, 33/48, 367 yards, 3 TD, 2 INT

**Top rushers**

- OAK — Napoleon Kaufman, 8 rushes, 66 yards
- IND — Edgerrin James, 18 rushes, 91 yards, TD

**Top receivers**

- OAK — Tim Brown, 8 receptions, 66 yards
- IND — Marvin Harrison, 10 receptions, 141 yards, TD

This was the first time the Raiders had ever visited Indianapolis, Their previous regular season away game against the Colts occurred as far back as 1975, although they also played in Baltimore during the 1977 postseason. This anomaly was due to old NFL scheduling formulas in place prior to 2002, whereby teams had no rotating schedule opposing members of other divisions within their own conference, but instead played interdivisional conference games according to position within a season's table.

==== Week 4: vs. Jacksonville Jaguars ====
Week 4: Jacksonville Jaguars (2–1) at Indianapolis Colts (1–1)

Quarter	1	2	3	4	Total
Jaguars	0	14	0	0	**14**
**Colts**	7	14	5	17	**43**

at RCA Dome

- Game time: 9:00 p.m., EST
- Game weather: Dome
- Game attendance: 56,816
- Referee: Mike Carey

Game information

**First quarter**

- IND — Harrison 76-yard pass from Manning (Vanderjagt kick), 10:59. Colts 7–0

**Second quarter**

- JAX — Smith 9-yard pass from Brunell (Lindsey kick), 7:36. 7—7
- IND — Wilkins 27-yard pass from Manning (Vanderjagt kick), 5:09. Colts 14–7
- IND — Pathon 16-yard pass from Manning (Vanderjagt kick), 1:28. Colts 21–7
- JAX — Smith 26-yard pass from Brunell (Lindsey kick), 0:11. Colts 21–14

**Third quarter**

- IND — Vanderjagt 41-yard field goal, 5:32. Colts 24–14
- IND — Brunell sacked by Bratzke in end zone for safety, 1:10. Colts 26–14

**Fourth quarter**

- IND — Vanderjagt 22-yard field goal, 11:31. Colts 29–14
- IND — Dilger 4-yard pass from Manning (Vanderjagt kick), 8:42. Colts 36–14
- IND — James 14-yard rush (Vanderjagt kick), 5:55. Colts 43–14

**Top passers**

- JAX — Mark Brunell, 21/36, 229 yards, 2 TD, 2 INT
- IND — Peyton Manning, 23/36, 440 yards, 4 TD

**Top rushers**

- JAX — Fred Taylor, 14 rushes, 57 yards
- IND — Edgerrin James, 22 rushes, 89 yards, TD

**Top receivers**

- JAX — Jimmy Smith, 9 receptions, 132 yards, 2 TD
- IND — Terrence Wilkins, 9 receptions, 148 yards, TD

==== Week 5: at Buffalo Bills ====
Week 5: Indianapolis Colts (2–1) at Buffalo Bills (2–1)

Quarter	1	2	3	4	Total
**Colts**	0	7	0	11	**18**
Bills	3	6	0	7	**16**

at Ralph Wilson Stadium

- Game time: 1:01 p.m., EST
- Game weather: 70 °F or 21.1 °C, relative humidity 52%, wind 10 miles per hour (16 km/h; 8.7 kn)
- Game attendance: 72,617
- Referee: Gerry Austin

Game information

**First quarter**

- BUF — Christie 19-yard field goal, 7:19. Bills 3–0

**Second quarter**

- BUF — Christie 30-yard field goal, 14:12. Bills 6–0
- BUF — Christie 27-yard field goal, 8:54. Bills 9–0
- IND – Harrison 14-yard pass from Manning (Vanderjagt kick), 4:09. Bills 9–7

**Third quarter**

- No scoring plays

**Fourth quarter**

- IND — Wilkins 10-yard pass from Manning (James run), 14:10. Colts 15–9
- BUF – Moulds 40-yard pass from Johnson (Christie kick), 1:08. Bills 16–15
- IND — Vanderjagt 45-yard field goal, 0:00. Colts 18–16

**Top passers**

- IND — Peyton Manning, 16/27, 187 yards, 2 TD, INT
- BUF — Rob Johnson, 21/32, 246 yards, TD

**Top rushers**

- IND — Edgerrin James, 19 rushes, 60 yards
- BUF — Jonathan Linton, 13 rushes, 58 yards

**Top receivers**

- IND — Marvin Harrison, 3 receptions, 45 yards, TD
- BUF — Eric Moulds, 9 receptions, 112 yards, TD

==== Week 6: at New England Patriots ====
Week 6: Indianapolis Colts (3–1) at New England Patriots (1–4)

Quarter	1	2	3	4	Total
Colts	0	10	3	3	**16**
**Patriots**	3	7	0	14	**24**

at Foxboro Stadium

- Date: October 8, 2000
- Game time: 1:02 p.m., EST
- Game weather: 55 °F or 12.8 °C, wind 20 miles per hour (32 km/h; 17 kn)
- Game attendance: 60,292
- Referee: Walt Coleman

Game information

**First quarter**

- NWE — Vinatieri 21-yard field goal, 10:01. Patriots 3–0

**Second quarter**

- IND — Harrison 17-yard pass from Manning (Vanderjagt kick), 8:24. Colts 7–3
- IND — Vanderjagt 33-yard field goal, 0:10. Colts 10–3
- NWE — Tony Simmons 44-yard pass from Bishop (Adam Vinatieri kick), 0:00. 10–10

**Third quarter**

- IND — Vanderjagt 33-yard field goal, 4:41. Colts 13–10

**Fourth quarter**

- NWE — Bjornson 2-yard pass from Bledsoe (Vinatieri kick), 14:56. Patriots 17–13
- NWE — Glenn 4-yard pass from Bledsoe (Vinatieri kick), 7:26. Patriots 24–13
- IND — Vanderjagt 34-yard field goal, 0:36. Patriots 24–16

**Top passers**

- IND — Peyton Manning, 31/54, 334 yards, TD, 3 INT
- NWE — Drew Bledsoe, 15/23, 142 yards, 2 TD

**Top rushers**

- IND — Edgerrin James, 24 rushes, 75 yards
- NWE — Kevin Faulk, 12 rushes, 64 yards

**Top receivers**

- IND — Marvin Harrison, 13 receptions, 159 yards, TD
- NWE — Terry Glenn, 5 receptions, 51 yards, TD

==== Week 10: at Chicago Bears ====
Week 10: Indianapolis Colts at Chicago Bears

Quarter	1	2	3	4	Total
Colts	10	7	7	3	**27**
**Bears**	0	3	7	14	**24**

at Soldier Field, Chicago, Illinois

- Date: November 5, 2000
- Game time: 3:15 p.m. CST
- Game weather: Overcast, 57 °F (14 °C)
- Game attendance: 66,944
- TV announcers (CBS): Ian Eagle and Mark May

Game information

**First quarter**

**Second quarter**

**Third quarter**

**Fourth quarter**

Top passers

- IND – Peyton Manning – 26/39, 302 yards, 2 TD, INT
- CHI – Jim Miller – 24/35, 203 yards, TD

Top rushers

- IND – Edgerrin James – 17 rushes, 68 yards, TD
- CHI – James Allen – 16 rushes, 85 yards

Top receivers

- IND – Ken Dilger – 5 receptions, 66 yards
- CHI – Marcus Robinson – 8 receptions, 90 yards, TD

==== Week 12: at Green Bay Packers ====
Week 12: Indianapolis Colts at Green Bay Packers

Quarter	1	2	3	4	Total
Colts	0	0	3	21	**24**
**Packers**	0	14	0	7	**21**

at Lambeau Field, Green Bay, Wisconsin

- Date: November 19, 2000
- Game time: 12:00 p.m. CST
- Game weather: Overcast, 27 °F (−3 °C)
- Game attendance: 59,869
- TV announcers (CBS): Ian Eagle and Mark May

Game information

**First quarter**

**Second quarter**

**Third quarter**

**Fourth quarter**

Top passers

- IND – Peyton Manning – 25/44, 294 yards, 3 TD, INT
- GB – Brett Favre – 23/36, 301 yards, 2 TD, INT

Top rushers

- IND – Edgerrin James – 17 rushes, 71 yards
- GB – Ahman Green – 24 rushes, 153 yards

Top receivers

- IND – E. G. Green – 6 receptions, 81 yards, TD
- GB – Bill Schroeder – 8 receptions, 155 yards

==== Week 17: vs. Minnesota Vikings ====
Week 17: Minnesota Vikings (11–4) at Indianapolis Colts (9–6)

Quarter	1	2	3	4	Total
Vikings	7	3	0	0	**10**
**Colts**	7	14	7	3	**31**

at Hubert H. Humphrey Metrodome, Minneapolis, Minnesota

- Date: December 24
- Game time: 4:15 p.m. EST
- Game weather: None (indoor stadium)
- Game attendance: 56,672
- Referee: Bill Carollo (63)
- TV announcers (FOX): Pat Summerall, John Madden, D.J. Johnson
- Recap, Game Book

Game information

**First quarter**

- IND – Marvin Harrison 4-yard pass from Peyton Manning (Mike Vanderjagt kick), 7:32. Colts 7–0. **Drive: 13 plays, 75 yards, 5:45.**
- MIN – Randy Moss 42-yard pass from Daunte Culpepper (Gary Anderson kick), 3:07. Tied 7–7. **Drive: 8 plays, 81 yards, 4:25.**

**Second quarter**

- IND – Edgerrin James 52-yard pass from Peyton Manning (Mike Vanderjagt kick), 9:12. Colts 14–7. **Drive: 6 plays, 87 yards, 2:43.**
- MIN – Gary Anderson 31-yard field goal, 5:04. Colts 14–10. **Drive: 4 plays, 5 yards, 1:22.**
- IND – Marvin Harrison 15-yard pass from Peyton Manning (Mike Vanderjagt kick), 1:19. Colts 21–10. **Drive: 9 plays, 76 yards, 3:45.**

**Third quarter**

- IND – Marvin Harrison 18-yard pass from Peyton Manning (Mike Vanderjagt kick), 7:47. Colts 28–10. **Drive: 5 plays, 55 yards, 2:25.**

**Fourth quarter**

- IND – Mike Vanderjagt 28-yard field goal, 9:54. Colts 31–10. **Drive: 13 plays, 85 yards, 6:33.**

**Top passers**

- MIN – Daunte Culpepper – 7/10, 97 yards, TD
- IND – Peyton Manning – 25/36, 283 yards, 4 TD, INT

**Top rushers**

- MIN – Robert Smith – 15 rushes, 37 yards
- IND – Edgerrin James – 26 rushes, 128 yards

**Top receivers**

- MIN – Cris Carter – 4 receptions, 67 yards
- IND – Marvin Harrison – 12 receptions, 109 yards, 3 TD

This was the first occasion the Colts hosted the Vikings in the regular season since 1968 in Baltimore, although the two teams would again play in the Colts’ stadium during that postseason. The intervening gap of 31 seasons constitutes the second-longest gap without one team visiting another in NFL history, and at the time was a record. (Note: Tampa Bay did not play at Buffalo until 2009, although the Buccaneers joined the league 33 seasons previously.)

== Standings ==
AFC East
	W	L	T	PCT	PF	PA	STK
^{(3)} Miami Dolphins	11	5	0	.688	323	226	W1
^{(6)} Indianapolis Colts	10	6	0	.625	429	326	W3
New York Jets	9	7	0	.563	321	321	L3
Buffalo Bills	8	8	0	.500	315	350	W1
New England Patriots	5	11	0	.313	276	338	L1

== Playoffs ==
The team earned a Wild Card berth to the playoffs as the No. 6 seed and traveled to Miami to face the Dolphins. The Dolphins turned the ball over three times in the first half as the Colts staked a 14–0 lead by halftime. Miami then outscored the Colts 17–3 in the second half to send it to overtime. The Colts had a chance to win the game with a 49-yard FG but Mike Vanderjagt's kick was wide right. The Dolphins then marched 61 yards in 11 plays, ending with a Lamar Smith game-winning touchdown.

Round	Date	Opponent (seed)	Result	Record	Venue	Attendance
Wild Card	December 30	at Miami Dolphins (3)	L 17–23	0–1	Pro Player Stadium	73,193

== Awards and records ==
- Marvin Harrison, AFC Pro Bowl Selection
- Edgerrin James, AFC Offensive Player of the Week, week 7
- Edgerrin James, AFC Offensive Player of the Week, week 15
- Edgerrin James, AFC Pro Bowl Selection,
- Peyton Manning, AFC Offensive Player of the Week, week 4
- Peyton Manning, AFC Offensive Player of the Week, week 17
- Peyton Manning, AFC Pro Bowl Selection
- Hunter Smith, AFC Special Teams Player of the Month, September
- Mike Vanderjagt, AFC Special Teams Player of the Week, week 5
