= 1999 Indianapolis Colts season =

47th season in franchise history

- Owner: Jim Irsay
- General manager: Bill Polian
- Head coach: Jim Mora
- Home stadium: RCA Dome

Results
- Record: 13–3
- Division place: 1st AFC East
- Playoffs: Lost Divisional Playoffs (vs. Titans) 16–19
- Pro Bowlers: QB Peyton Manning; RB Edgerrin James; WR Marvin Harrison

The 1999 Indianapolis Colts season was the 47th season for the team in the National Football League and 16th in Indianapolis. The Indianapolis Colts finished the National Football League's 1999 season with a record of 13 wins and 3 losses, and won the AFC East for the first time since 1987. This was the franchise's first 10-win season since 1977, when they were still in Baltimore. This season resulted in the franchise's first playoff appearance since 1996.

This season marked a turning point for the Colts franchise, as the team had only made the playoffs three times since 1977. Since 1999, the Colts have been one of the more successful NFL franchises, with 15 playoff appearances, two AFC Championships, and earning a Super Bowl title in Super Bowl XLI. This was the first time a team had done a 10-game single-season turnaround, and since then only the 2008 Miami Dolphins and 2025 New England Patriots have been able to match it.

Despite completing a great turnaround from 3–13 to 13–3, the Colts would go on to lose to the eventual AFC Champion Tennessee Titans in the Divisional Round of the playoffs. After the 1999 season, the Colts never reached the top of the AFC East again, moving to the new AFC South division in 2002.

In the 1999 NFL Draft the Colts selected right guard Brandon Burlsworth with the 63rd overall pick. Tragically, days before he signed with the Colts and being named a starter, he was killed in a road accident with a semitruck.

== Offseason ==
The Colts made a major trade on April 16 when they sent Marshall Faulk, who rushed for over 1,300 yards and caught 86 passes in 1998, to the St. Louis Rams for two draft picks.

=== 1999 expansion draft ===
Colts selected during the expansion draft
Pick	Name	Position	Expansion team
12	Elijah Alexander	Linebacker	Cleveland Browns

=== NFL draft ===
1999 Indianapolis Colts draft
Round	Pick	Player	Position	College	Notes
1	4	Edgerrin James * ^{†}	RB	Miami (FL)	
2	36	Mike Peterson	LB	Florida	from St. Louis
3	63	Brandon Burlsworth	OG	Arkansas	Died in a car accident before the start of the season.
4	96	Paul Miranda	CB	Central Florida	from Cleveland via San Francisco
5	138	Brad Scioli	DE	Penn State	from St. Louis
7	210	Hunter Smith	P	Notre Dame	
7	250	Corey Terry	LB	Tennessee	supplemental compensatory selection
Made roster † Pro Football Hall of Fame * Made at least one Pro Bowl during career

=== Undrafted free agents ===
1999 undrafted free agents of note
Player	Position	College
Chris Eberly	Running back	Penn State
Chris Gall	Fullback	Indiana
Isaac Jones	Wide Receiver	Purdue
Josh Keur	Tight End	Michigan State
Chukie Nwokorie	Defensive End	Purdue
Tim Ridder	Tackle	Notre Dame
Roderick Robinson	Quarterback	Arkansas-PB
Paul Shields	Fullback	Arizona
Kirby Smart	Defensive back	Georgia
Terrence Wilkins	Wide Receiver	Virginia

== Personnel ==
=== Staff / Coaches ===
1999 Indianapolis Colts staff
Front office: Owner and chief executive officer – Jim Irsay; President – Bill Polian; Director of football operations – Dom Anile; Director of pro player personnel – Clyde Powers; Director of pro scouting – Chris Polian; Head coaches: Head coach – Jim E. Mora; Assistant head coach/defensive backs – George Catavolos; Offensive coaches: Offensive coordinator – Tom Moore; Quarterbacks – Bruce Arians; Running backs – Gene Huey; Receivers – Jay Norvell; Tight ends – Tony Marciano; Offensive line – Howard Mudd	Defensive coaches: Defensive coordinator – Vic Fangio; Defensive line – Todd Grantham; Linebackers – Mike Murphy; Defensive assistant – John Pagano; Special teams coaches: Special teams – Kevin Spencer; Strength and conditioning: Strength and conditioning – Jon Torine

=== Roster ===
1999 Indianapolis Colts roster
Quarterbacks (QB): 13 Kelly Holcomb; 18 Peyton Manning; 4 Steve Walsh; Running backs (RB): 23 Keith Elias; 43 Scott Greene FB; 32 Edgerrin James; 34 Leeland McElroy; 39 Paul Shields FB; Wide receivers (WR): 84 E. G. Green; 88 Marvin Harrison; 15 Isaac Jones; 86 Jerome Pathon; 16 Chad Plummer; 80 Terrence Wilkins RS; Tight ends (TE): 85 Ken Dilger; 81 Marcus Pollard	Offensive linemen (OL): 78 Tarik Glenn T; 74 Waverly Jackson G; 59 Jason Johnson C; 76 Steve McKinney G; 73 Adam Meadows T; 50 Larry Moore C; 63 Jeff Saturday G; 71 Jamie Wilson T; Defensive linemen (DL): 57 Bertrand Berry DE; 72 Shane Bonham DT; 92 Chad Bratzke DE; 64 Larry Chester DT; 62 Ellis Johnson DT; 61 Tony McCoy DT; 91 Chukie Nwokorie DE; 99 Brad Scioli DE; 90 Mark Thomas DE; 95 Bernard Whittington DT	Linebackers (LB): 53 Mike Barber MLB; 97 Cornelius Bennett OLB; 52 Mike Peterson OLB; 56 Spencer Reid MLB; 55 Ratcliff Thomas OLB; Defensive backs (DB): 47 Billy Austin FS; 29 Jason Belser FS; 26 Tony Blevins CB; 20 Jeff Burris CB; 37 Chad Cota SS; 21 Paul Miranda CB; 31 Mustafah Muhammad CB; 38 Tyrone Poole CB; 27 Thomas Randolph CB; 40 Eric Smedley SS; Special teams (ST): 83 Bradford Banta LS; 7 Danny Kight K; 17 Hunter Smith P; 12 Mike Vanderjagt K	Practice squad: 46 Josh Keur TE; 25 Craig Miller CB; 65 Tim Ridder T; 75 Paul Snellings T; 58 Nate Stimson LB; Reserve: 54 Phil Armour C (IR); 51 Jeff Brady LB (IR); 87 Lake Dawson WR (IR); 44 Darick Holmes RB (IR); 96 Shawn King DE (Susp.); 5 Eric Olsen K (Military Reserve); Rookies in italics 53 active, 6 reserve, 5 practice squad

== Regular season ==
=== Schedule ===
Week	Date	Opponent	Result	Record	Venue	Attendance
1	September 12	**Buffalo Bills**	**W** 31–14	1–0	RCA Dome	56,238
2	September 19	at **New England Patriots**	**L** 28–31	1–1	Foxboro Stadium	59,640
3	September 26	at San Diego Chargers	**W** 27–19	2–1	Qualcomm Stadium	56,942
4	Bye					
5	October 10	**Miami Dolphins**	**L** 31–34	2–2	RCA Dome	56,810
6	October 17	at **New York Jets**	**W** 16–13	3–2	Giants Stadium	78,112
7	October 24	Cincinnati Bengals	**W** 31–10	4–2	RCA Dome	55,996
8	October 31	Dallas Cowboys	**W** 34–24	5–2	RCA Dome	56,860
9	November 7	Kansas City Chiefs	**W** 25–17	6–2	RCA Dome	56,689
10	November 14	at New York Giants	**W** 27–19	7–2	Giants Stadium	78,081
11	November 21	at Philadelphia Eagles	**W** 44–17	8–2	Veterans Stadium	65,521
12	November 28	**New York Jets**	**W** 13–6	9–2	RCA Dome	56,689
13	December 5	at **Miami Dolphins**	**W** 37–34	10–2	Pro Player Stadium	74,096
14	December 12	**New England Patriots**	**W** 20–15	11–2	RCA Dome	56,975
15	December 19	Washington Redskins	**W** 24–21	12–2	RCA Dome	57,013
16	December 26	at Cleveland Browns	**W** 29–28	13–2	Cleveland Browns Stadium	72,618
17	January 2	at **Buffalo Bills**	**L** 6–31	13–3	Ralph Wilson Stadium	61,959
Note: Intra-division opponents are in **bold** text.

== Standings ==
AFC East
	W	L	T	PCT	PF	PA	STK
^{(2)} Indianapolis Colts	13	3	0	.813	423	333	L1
^{(5)} Buffalo Bills	11	5	0	.688	320	229	W3
^{(6)} Miami Dolphins	9	7	0	.563	326	336	L2
New York Jets	8	8	0	.500	308	309	W4
New England Patriots	8	8	0	.500	299	284	W1

== Notable games ==
=== Week 1 vs Bills ===
The 1999 Colts season began with a 31–14 rout of the Buffalo Bills. Peyton Manning's fourth career NFL win came via two touchdown throws to Marvin Harrison, an Edgerrin James rushing score, a 74-yard interception return touchdown by Tony Blevins, and a Mike Vanderjagt field goal. Doug Flutie of the Bills had one touchdown throw and two picks.

=== Week 2 at Patriots ===
Manning erupted in the first half, completing 14 of 17 throws with three touchdown throws to Marvin Harrison along with an Edgerrin James rushing score while the Patriots shot themselves in the foot with penalties, ultimately committing fifteen fouls eating up 135 yards and trailing the Colts 28–7. But from the start of the second half the Patriots shut down Manning, limiting him to just four completions in 13 throws. Following a Manning interception in the third quarter a Terry Allen touchdown catch put the Patriots down 28–14, and was followed by 17 unanswered Patriots points; Marcus Pollard fumbled the ball to Ty Law and Drew Bledsoe passes to Terry Glenn led to a three-yard Ben Coates touchdown catch. After Law forced a Manning three-and-out Bledsoe marched the Patriots down field and connected with Coates for a 10-yard tying touchdown with three minutes to go. James was then hammered by Tebucky Jones and fumbled the ball to Brandon Mitchell, and from there the Patriots reached range for Adam Vinatieri's 26-yard game-winner with 35 seconds left in a 31–28 Patriots triumph.

=== Week 3 at San Diego ===
Manning's Indianapolis predecessor Jim Harbaugh started for the Chargers and a Manning score to Marvin Harrison put the Colts up 10–0, but the Chargers scored 16 points in the second quarter. With the Chargers up 19–13 in the fourth Manning scored twice, once on a rush, for the 27–19 win.

=== Week 5 vs. Dolphins ===
The Colts' uneven start to the season continued against the Miami Dolphins, who were going through controversy themselves following reactions by Dan Marino and coach Jimmy Johnson ("I don't always say the right things, but I say what I feel", Johnson said after the Colts game) to a 23–18 loss to Buffalo the week before. Indianapolis clawed to a 17–9 lead in the third quarter, but it was the fourth quarter where the game exploded. First Tony Martin caught a 28-yard Marino touchdown two minutes into the quarter; on the ensuing kickoff Terrence Wilkins ran back 97 yards for a Colts touchdown. Over the next ten minutes Miami's Cecil Collins and Olindo Mare and Indy's Marcus Pollard put the score at 31–25 Indianapolis. With three minutes to go Manning deliberately ran out the back of the endzone for a safety to bleed clock, and the Colts were forced to kick off to Miami. On the ensuing Dolphins drive a Marino pass was initially ruled a fumble but Gerald Austin overruled the penalty after review. Marino drove to the Colts' 2-yard line (the key play was a 58-yard completion to Oronde Gadsden on fourth down; Marino audibled out of what Johnson had intended; Johnson's reluctance to give Marino that power was the main source of friction), and with 27 seconds remaining threw to Oronde Gadsden in the endzone; he caught the ball and was thrown out of bounds before his feet touched the ground inbounds, but following a huddle by referees the play was ruled a touchdown based on force-out rules (which would be changed years later). The 34–31 Dolphins triumph put the Colts at 2–2.

=== Week 6 at NY Jets ===
The Colts fell behind 13–0 in the second quarter, but from there the game (and the season) turned in Indy's favor. A Terrence Wilkins touchdown catch and two Mike Vanderjagt field goals tied the game, then Vanderjagt kicked the game-winner with 14 seconds remaining, putting the Colts to the 16–13 final and the start of an 11-game winning streak.

=== Week 7 vs. Bengals ===
The 1–5 Bengals were never in contention as four Colts touchdowns, two by Edgerrin James, were easily enough in a 31–10 Indianapolis win.

=== Week 8 vs Cowboys ===
The latest Super Bowl V rematch began as the Cowboys, despite Michael Irvin being out for the year with injury, clawed to a 17–3 lead in the second quarter. The Colts then stormed back with 17-straight points. An exchange of touchdowns left the score 28–24 and Troy Aikman was pulled early in the fourth. A scary incident occurred when Mark Thomas of the Colts was accidentally kicked in the head and had to be put on a stretcher.

=== Week 9 vs. Chiefs ===
In a battle of 5–2 teams the lead changed four times as Manning ran in the winning score with 10:49 to go. With the Colts up 25–17 Warren Moon came in for the final twenty two seconds for the Chiefs but his pass to Joe Horn fell incomplete.

=== Week 10 at NY Giants ===
Week Ten: Indianapolis Colts (6–2) at New York Giants (5–3)

Quarter	1	2	3	4	Total
Colts	7	0	17	3	27
Giants	0	6	0	13	19

at Giants Stadium, East Rutherford, New Jersey

- Date: November 14, 1999
- Game time: 1:00 p.m. EDT
- Game weather: Overcast, 56 °F (13 °C)
- Game attendance: 78,081
- Referee: Bob McElwee
- TV announcers (CBS): Ian Eagle, Mark May
- Box Score

Game information

First quarter

- IND – Marvin Harrison 19-yard pass from Peyton Manning (Mike Vanderjagt kick), 0:48. Colts 7–0. Drive: 9 plays, 97 yards, 4:15.

Second quarter

- NYG – Cary Blanchard 33-yard field goal, 12:09. Colts 7–3. Drive: 7 plays, 52 yards, 3:39.
- NYG – Cary Blanchard 42-yard field goal, 2:45. Colts 7–6. Drive: 10 plays, 37 yards, 4:39.

Third quarter

- IND – Marvin Harrison 57-yard pass from Peyton Manning (Mike Vanderjagt kick), 9:06. Colts 14–6. Drive: 3 plays, 80 yards, 1:19.
- IND – Mike Vanderjagt 40-yard field goal, 4:24. Colts 17–6. Drive: 7 plays, 25 yards, 3:11.
- IND – Terrence Wilkins 39-yard punt return (Mike Vanderjagt kick), 2:44. Colts 24–6.

Fourth quarter

- NYG – Amani Toomer 33-yard pass from Kent Graham (pass failed), 14:17. Colts 24–12. Drive: 8 plays, 80 yards, 3:27.
- IND – Mike Vanderjagt 35-yard field goal, 11:37. Colts 27–12. Drive: 5 plays, 63 yards, 2:40.
- NYG – Pete Mitchell 7-yard pass from Kent Graham (Cary Blanchard kick), 6:50. Colts 27–19. Drive: 13 plays, 72 yards, 4:47.

Top passers

- IND – Peyton Manning – 20/35, 237 yards, 2 TD, INT
- NYG – Kent Graham – 27/50, 253 yards, 2 TD, 2 INT

Top rushers

- IND – Edgerrin James – 16 rushes, 108 yards
- NYG – Tiki Barber – 9 rushes, 57 yards

Top receivers

- IND – Marvin Harrison – 6 receptions, 109 yards, 2 TD
- NYG – Ike Hilliard – 6 receptions, 78 yards

Two Marvin Harrison touchdowns and a Terrence Wilkins punt return score highlighted a 27–19 Colts win. Former Colt Cary Blanchard booted two field goals.

=== Week 11 at Eagles ===
The Colts erupted to their biggest point total of the season with 44. Manning had three touchdowns and Edgerrin James two more. Rookie Donovan McNabb in his second start was picked off twice.

=== Week 12 vs. NY Jets ===
The Jets limited Manning to one touchdown with two picks but Bill Parcells experiment Ray Lucas in his fourth start completed just twelve passes in a 13–6 Colts win.

=== Week 13 at Dolphins ===
The season rematch was another high-scoring affair. Edgerrin James ran in two first-half touchdowns while Chad Cota scored off a Miami fumble for a 24–10 Colts halftime lead. Once again Miami fought back; first Sam Madison picked off Manning and ran back for a 25-yard touchdown, then Dan Marino touchdown throws to Stanley Pritchett and Tony Martin offset a Manning touchdown to Terrence Wilkins and left the score tied at 31 early in the fourth. Mike Vanderjagt's field goal in the final five minutes was answered by an Olindo Mare kick with 36 seconds to go, but the Colts drove to range of a 53-yard Vanderjagt kick on the final play. The kick was good for a 37–34 Colts win, their eighth straight.

=== Week 14 vs. Patriots ===
Peyton Manning's first career win over the Patriots was a 20–15 affair in which he threw for only 186 yards and two touchdowns. The Patriots committed 12 penalties for 86 yards and Drew Bledsoe was sacked five times despite throwing for 379 yards and a late-fourth-quarter touchdown to Shawn Jefferson.

=== Week 15 vs. Redskins ===
Down at the start of the fourth the Colts scored twice, enough to absorb a late Redskins score and successful onside kick; the Skins though failed to convert fourth down for the 24–21 Indianapolis win.

=== Week 16 at Browns ===
The Colts' first trip to Cleveland since a 23–17 loss in 1988 turned into a hard-fought affair. The Colts trailed 14–7 in the second quarter, then trailed 28–19 at the end of the third quarter, but clawed to a 28–26 score in the fourth off an Edgerrin James rushing touchdown, then rallied for the win on a 21-yard Vanderjagt field goal with four seconds left. It was Indy's 13th win of the season, the first 13-win season for the Colts since the ill-fated 1968 Baltimore Colts went 13–1 before facing Joe Namath (ironically following a Colts playoff win over the Browns), and locked up a playoff bye for Indianapolis.

== Postseason ==
The Colts earned the No. 2 seed for the playoffs and received a bye for the Wild-Card round of the playoffs. They played host to the Tennessee Titans in the Divisional round. This was the first-ever NFL playoff game played in Indianapolis, and the franchise's first home playoff game since 1977, when it was still in Baltimore.

The game was close throughout until Titans running back Eddie George ran for a 68-yard touchdown in the 3rd quarter. George rushed for a team playoff-record 162 yards to help lead the Titans to victory.

Playoff Round	Date	Opponent (seed)	Result	Record	Game Site	Attendance
Wild Card	First-round Bye					
Divisional	January 16, 2000	Tennessee Titans (4)	L 16–19	0–1	RCA Dome	57,097

== See also ==
- History of the Indianapolis Colts
- Indianapolis Colts seasons
