= 1998 Indianapolis Colts season =

46th season in franchise history; first with Peyton Manning

- Owner: Jim Irsay
- General manager: Bill Polian
- Head coach: Jim E. Mora
- Home stadium: RCA Dome

Results
- Record: 3–13
- Division place: 5th AFC East
- Playoffs: Did not qualify
- Pro Bowlers: RB Marshall Faulk

The 1998 Indianapolis Colts season was the 46th season for the team in the National Football League (NFL) and 15th in Indianapolis. The Indianapolis Colts finished the National Football League's 1998 season with a record of 3 wins and 13 losses, and finished fifth in the AFC East division.

Coming off a 3–13 season the year before, the Colts drafted quarterback Peyton Manning with the first overall pick in the 1998 NFL draft. Manning would mark the beginning of a new era for the Colts, as he would lead them to their second Super Bowl title nine seasons later.

This season was Marshall Faulk's last with the Colts as he was traded to the St. Louis Rams in the off-season. He had his best seasons in St. Louis, helping the Rams to two Super Bowls in 1999 and 2001 and winning the league's MVP in 2000.

On November 29, the Colts played their first game in Baltimore since the controversial relocation in 1984.

As previously mentioned, this was Faulk's final year in a Colts uniform and he finished his Indianapolis career in style rushing for 1,319 yards and 6 touchdowns and catching a team leading 86 passes for 908 yards and 4 touchdowns leading the entire NFL in total yards from scrimmage with 2,227 (beating out 2nd-place finisher and league MVP Terrell Davis by just two yards). Another bright spot was rookie quarterback Peyton Manning who passed for 3,739 yards and 26 touchdowns, but he also led the NFL in interceptions thrown with 28. Although the Colts only matched their 3–13 record from the preceding season, seven of those losses were by seven points or fewer. The Colts did not win a single game on the road. After the season, Craig Heyward retired.

== Offseason ==
Additions	Subtractions
DT Jeff Zgonina (Rams)	QB Jim Harbaugh (Ravens)
G Tom Myslinski (Steelers)	G Doug Widell (Packers)
S Tim Hauck (Seahawks)	WR Sean Dawkins (Saints)
RB Craig Heyward (Rams)	K Cary Blanchard (Redskins)
LB Jeff Herrod (Eagles)	WR Brian Stablein (Patriots)
CB Jeff Burris (Bills)	G Jason Mathews (Oilers)
WR Torrance Small (Rams)	LB Steve Grant (Buccaneers)
QB Bill Musgrave (Broncos)	G Eugene Chung (Chiefs)
	FS Derwin Gray (Panthers)

=== NFL draft ===
1998 Indianapolis Colts draft
Round	Pick	Player	Position	College	Notes
1	1	Peyton Manning * ^{†}	QB	Tennessee	
2	32	Jerome Pathon	WR	Washington	
3	71	E. G. Green	WR	Florida State	from Baltimore
4	93	Steve McKinney	C	Texas A&M	from Indianapolis via Baltimore
5	135	Antony Jordan	LB	Vanderbilt	from Cincinnati
7	190	Aaron Taylor	C	Nebraska	
7	231	Corey Gaines	S	Tennessee	compensatory selection
Made roster † Pro Football Hall of Fame * Made at least one Pro Bowl during career

=== Undrafted free agents ===
1998 undrafted free agents of note
Player	Position	College
Larry Chester	Defensive tackle	Temple
Mike Vanderjagt	Kicker	West Virginia

== Personnel ==
=== Staff ===
1998 Indianapolis Colts staff
Front office: Owner and chief executive officer – Jim Irsay; President – Bill Polian; Director of football operations – Dom Anile; Director of pro player personnel – Clyde Powers; Director of pro scouting – Chris Polian; Director of college scouting – George Boone; Head coaches: Head coach – Jim E. Mora; Assistant head coach – George Catavolos; Offensive coaches: Offensive coordinator – Tom Moore; Quarterbacks – Bruce Arians; Running backs – Gene Huey; Receivers – Jay Norvell; Tight ends – Tony Marciano; Offensive line – Howard Mudd	Defensive coaches: Defensive coordinator – Rusty Tillman; Defensive line – Greg Blache; Linebackers – Mike Murphy; Defensive backs – George Catavolos; Defensive assistant – John Pagano; Special teams coaches: Special teams – Kevin Spencer; Strength and conditioning: Conditioning – Jon Torine; Strength – Tom Zupancic

=== Roster ===
1998 Indianapolis Colts roster
Quarterbacks (QB): 13 Kelly Holcomb; 18 Peyton Manning; 10 Doug Nussmeier; Running backs (RB): 23 Keith Elias; 28 Marshall Faulk; 43 Scott Greene FB; 44 Chris Hetherington FB; 21 Lamont Warren KR; Wide receivers (WR): 80 Aaron Bailey; 84 E. G. Green; 11 Kaipo McGuire; 86 Jerome Pathon; 87 Torrance Small; Tight ends (TE): 85 Ken Dilger; 81 Marcus Pollard	Offensive linemen (OL): 71 Jon Blackman T; 78 Tarik Glenn T; 74 Waverly Jackson T; 60 Jason Johnson C; 58 Jay Leeuwenburg C; 76 Steve McKinney G; 73 Adam Meadows T; 72 Larry Moore G; 67 Tom Myslinski G; Defensive linemen (DL): 57 Bertrand Berry DE; 64 Larry Chester DT; 93 Jason Chorak DE; 94 Nate Hobgood-Chittick DT; 62 Ellis Johnson DT; 61 Tony McCoy DT; 75 Mark Thomas DE; 96 Van Tuinei DE; 95 Bernard Whittington DE; 90 Jeff Zgonina DT	Linebackers (LB): 50 Elijah Alexander OLB; 53 Mike Barber MLB; 54 Jeff Herrod MLB; 91 Antony Jordan OLB; 52 Steve Morrison OLB; 51 Ron Rogers OLB; Defensive backs (DB): 47 Billy Austin CB; 29 Jason Belser S; 25 Robert Blackmon SS; 26 Tony Blevins CB; 20 Jeff Burris CB; 27 Rico Clark CB; 45 Tim Hauck FS; 40 Ray McElroy CB; 34 Monty Montgomery CB; 38 Tyrone Poole CB; Special teams (ST): 83 Bradford Banta LS; 17 Chris Gardocki P; 12 Mike Vanderjagt K	Practice squad: 46 Kantroy Barber RB; 16 Eddie Goines WR; 65 Chance McCarty DE; 14 Kio Sanford WR; Reserve: 53 Sammie Burroughs LB (IR); 99 Albert Fontenot DE (IR); 98 Dan Footman DE (IR); 88 Marvin Harrison WR (IR); 34 Craig Heyward FB (NF-Inj.); 36 Charles Kirby FB (IR); 79 Tony Mandarich G (IR); 41 Nakia Reddick S (IR); 56 Andre Royal LB (IR); 68 Trey Sartin T (IR); 97 Kendel Shello DT (IR); Rookies in italics 53 active, 11 reserve, 4 practice squad

== Regular season ==
=== Schedule ===
Week	Date	Opponent	Result	Record	Venue	Attendance
1	September 6	**Miami Dolphins**	**L** 15–24	0–1	RCA Dome	60,587
2	September 13	at **New England Patriots**	**L** 6–29	0–2	Foxboro Stadium	60,068
3	September 20	at **New York Jets**	**L** 6–44	0–3	Giants Stadium	66,321
4	September 27	New Orleans Saints	**L** 13–19 (OT)	0–4	RCA Dome	48,480
5	October 4	San Diego Chargers	**W** 17–12	1–4	RCA Dome	51,988
6	October 11	**Buffalo Bills**	**L** 24–31	1–5	RCA Dome	52,938
7	October 18	at San Francisco 49ers	**L** 31–34	1–6	3Com Park	68,486
8	Bye					
9	November 1	**New England Patriots**	**L** 16–21	1–7	RCA Dome	58,056
10	November 8	at **Miami Dolphins**	**L** 14–27	1–8	Pro Player Stadium	73,400
11	November 15	**New York Jets**	**W** 24–23	2–8	RCA Dome	55,520
12	November 22	at **Buffalo Bills**	**L** 11–34	2–9	Rich Stadium	49,032
13	November 29	at Baltimore Ravens	**L** 31–38	2–10	Ravens Stadium	68,898
14	December 6	at Atlanta Falcons	**L** 21–28	2–11	Georgia Dome	61,141
15	December 13	Cincinnati Bengals	**W** 39–26	3–11	RCA Dome	55,179
16	December 20	at Seattle Seahawks	**L** 23–27	3–12	Kingdome	58,703
17	December 27	Carolina Panthers	**L** 19–27	3–13	RCA Dome	58,182
Note: Intra-division opponents are in **bold** text.

== Standings ==
AFC East
	W	L	T	PCT	PF	PA	STK
^{(2)} New York Jets	12	4	0	.750	416	266	W6
^{(4)} Miami Dolphins	10	6	0	.625	321	265	L1
^{(5)} Buffalo Bills	10	6	0	.625	400	333	W1
^{(6)} New England Patriots	9	7	0	.563	337	329	L1
Indianapolis Colts	3	13	0	.188	310	444	L2

== Season summary ==
=== Week 11 vs Jets ===
Week Eleven: New York Jets (6–3) at Indianapolis Colts (1–8)

Quarter	1	2	3	4	Total
Jets	3	20	0	0	23
Colts	10	0	7	7	24

at RCA Dome, Indianapolis, Indiana

- Date: November 15, 1998
- Game time: 1:00 p.m.
- Game weather: Indoors (dome)
- Game attendance: 55,520
- TV announcers (CBS): Ian Eagle & Mark May
- Box Score, Box Score

Team	Category	Player	Statistics
Jets	Passing	Vinny Testaverde	12/28, 249 Yds, TD, INT
Jets	Rushing	Curtis Martin	28 Rush, 134 Yds
Jets	Receiving	Wayne Chrebet	4 Rec, 112 Yds, TD
Colts	Passing	Peyton Manning	26/44, 276 Yds, 3 TD, 2 INT
Colts	Rushing	Marshall Faulk	20 Rush, 69 Yds
Colts	Receiving	Marvin Harrison	9 Rec, 128 Yds, TD

Scoring summary

Quarter	Time	Drive			Team	Scoring information	Score	
Quarter	Time	Plays	Yards	TOP	Team	Scoring information	NYJ	IND
1	10:17	7	19	2:36	Colts	31-yard field goal by Mike Vanderjagt	0	3
1	6:39	7	38	3:38	Jets	37-yard field goal by John Hall	3	3
1	3:25	6	40	3:14	Colts	Torrance Small 4-yard touchdown reception from Peyton Manning, Mike Vanderjagt kick good	3	10
2	14:02	7	74	4:23	Jets	Wayne Chrebet 63-yard touchdown reception from Vinny Testaverde, John Hall kick good	10	10
2	8:31	8	60	3:44	Jets	40-yard field goal by John Hall	13	10
2	0:22	12	62	5:00	Jets	25-yard field goal by John Hall	16	10
2	0:00				Jets	Missed field goal returned 104 yards for touchdown by Aaron Glenn, John Hall kick good	23	10
3	6:28	4	49	1:32	Colts	Marvin Harrison 38-yard touchdown reception from Peyton Manning, Mike Vanderjagt kick good	23	17
4	0:24	15	80	2:40	Colts	Marcus Pollard 14-yard touchdown reception from Peyton Manning, Mike Vanderjagt kick good	23	24
"TOP" = time of possession. For other American football terms, see Glossary of American football.							23	24

== See also ==
- History of the Indianapolis Colts
- Indianapolis Colts seasons
- Colts–Patriots rivalry
