= 2000 New York Jets season =

2000 season of NFL team New York Jets

- Owner: Woody & Christopher Johnson
- General manager: Bill Parcells
- Head coach: Al Groh
- Home stadium: Giants Stadium

Results
- Record: 9–7
- Division place: 3rd AFC East
- Playoffs: Did not qualify
- Pro Bowlers: C Kevin Mawae; FB Richie Anderson; LB Mo Lewis

Uniform
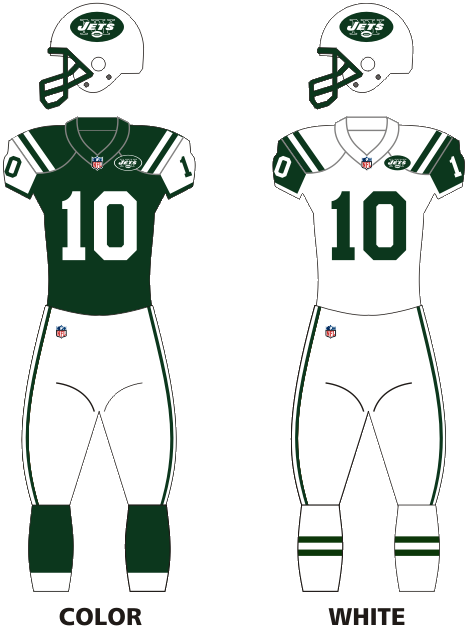

The 2000 New York Jets season was the 41st season for the team, and the 31st in the National Football League. It was also their first under the ownership of Woody and Christopher Johnson, who purchased the team in January 2000 from the estate of former owner Leon Hess.

The team tried to improve upon its 8–8 record from 1999 under new head coach Al Groh, who became the successor for Bill Parcells after Bill Belichick abruptly resigned to take the same position with the New England Patriots. Although they managed to finish one game better than they had in 1999, their 9–7 record (including three losses to close the year) was not enough to make the playoffs.

Shortly after the season ended, Groh resigned as coach to take the head coaching position at the University of Virginia, his alma mater.

Shortly after that, Parcells stepped down as Director of Football Operations and retired from football. Like his previous retirement, it proved to be temporary: Parcells was back in the NFL in 2003 as the head coach of the Dallas Cowboys, where he would remain until 2006.

== Offseason ==
Additions	Subtractions
DT Shane Burton (Bears)	FS Steve Atwater (retirement)
LS Bradford Banta (Colts)	WR Keyshawn Johnson (Buccaneers)
	LB Chad Cascadden (Patriots)
	DE Anthony Pleasant (49ers)
	LS John Hudson (Ravens)
	S Omar Stoutmire (Giants)
	QB Rick Mirer (49ers)
	CB Otis Smith (Patriots)
	DE Bobby Hamilton (Patriots)

=== NFL draft ===
2000 New York Jets draft
Round	Pick	Player	Position	College	Notes
1	12	Shaun Ellis *	DE	Tennessee	from Carolina via Washington and San Francisco
1	13	John Abraham *	LB	South Carolina	from San Diego via Tampa Bay
1	18	Chad Pennington	QB	Marshall	
1	27	Anthony Becht	TE	West Virginia	from Tampa Bay
3	78	Laveranues Coles *	WR	Florida State	
5	143	Windrell Hayes	WR	USC	
6	179	Tony Scott	CB	NC State	
7	218	Richard Seals	G	Utah	
Made roster * Made at least one Pro Bowl during career

=== Undrafted free agents ===
2000 undrafted free agents of note
Player	Position	College
Matt Farmer	Wide receiver	Air Force
Brian Gill	Defensive end	McNeese State
Jon Michals	Defensive end	Minnesota
Jake Moreland	Tight end	Western Michigan
Keith Short	Center	Virginia Tech

== Personnel ==
=== Staff/coaches ===
2000 New York Jets staff
Front office: Owner – Woody Johnson; Director of football operations – Bill Parcells; Director of pro player development/contract negotiations – Mike Tannenbaum; Head coaches: Head coach – Al Groh; Offensive coaches: Offensive coordinator – Dan Henning; Running backs – Maurice Carthon; Wide receivers – Todd Haley; Tight ends – Ken Whisenhunt; Offensive line – Bill Muir & Ray Lavigne (Lavigne took over in Week 11); Assistant offensive line – William Roberts	Defensive coaches: Defensive coordinator – Mike Nolan; Defensive line – Ray Hamilton; Linebackers – Bob Sutton; Secondary – Todd Bowles; Quality control – Peter Redebaugh; Special teams coaches: Special teams – Mike Sweatman; Strength and conditioning: Strength and conditioning – John Lott

=== Roster ===
New York Jets 2000 final roster
Quarterbacks: 6 Ray Lucas; 10 Chad Pennington; 16 Vinny Testaverde; Running backs: 20 Richie Anderson FB; 23 Marlion Jackson; 32 Leon Johnson; 28 Curtis Martin; 34 Bernie Parmalee; 33 Jerald Sowell FB; Wide receivers: 80 Wayne Chrebet; 87 Laveranues Coles; 86 Windrell Hayes; 85 Desmond Kitchings; 83 Dwight Stone; 89 Dedric Ward PR; Tight ends: 88 Anthony Becht; 37 Jake Moreland	Offensive linemen: 76 Jumbo Elliott T; 69 Jason Fabini T; 78 Cornell Green T; 71 Kerry Jenkins G; 79 David Loverne G; 63 J. P. Machado C; 68 Kevin Mawae C; 70 Chad Slaughter T; 77 Randy Thomas G; 74 Ryan Young T; Defensive linemen: 73 Maurice Anderson DE; 97 Dorian Boose DE; 98 Shane Burton DE; 92 Shaun Ellis DE; 72 Jason Ferguson NT; 93 Ernie Logan NT; 91 Jason Wiltz DE	Linebackers: 58 James Farrior OLB; 54 Dwayne Gordon ILB; 55 Marvin Jones ILB; 53 Courtney Ledyard OLB; 57 Mo Lewis OLB; 56 Roman Phifer OLB; Defensive backs: 42 Marcus Coleman CB; 25 Nick Ferguson SS; 47 Scott Frost FS; 31 Aaron Glenn CB; 21 Victor Green SS; 40 Chris Hayes FS; 24 Ray Mickens CB; 38 Earthwind Moreland CB; 27 Tony Scott CB; Special teams: 81 Bradford Banta LS; 1 Brett Conway K; 9 John Hall K; 7 Tom Tupa P	Reserve lists: 94 John Abraham LB (IR); 51 Bryan Cox LB (IR); 15 Matt Farmer WR (Miltitary Reserve); 62 Greg Lotysz T (IR); 95 Rick Lyle DE (IR); 99 Eric Ogbogu DE (IR); 66 David Viger G (Military Reserve); Practice squad: 85 Steve Brominski TE; 96 Jon Michals DE; 82 Shannon Myers WR; 50 J. J. Syvrud LB; rookies in italics 53 active, 7 inactive, 4 practice squad

== Preseason ==
Week	Date	Opponent	Result	Record	Venue
1	July 29	New Orleans Saints	W 24–20	1–0	Giants Stadium
2	August 4	at Green Bay Packers	L 24–37	1–1	Lambeau Field
3	August 12	at Baltimore Ravens	L 0–10	1–2	PSINet Stadium
4	August 18	New York Giants	W 27–24	2–2	Giants Stadium

== Regular season ==
=== Schedule ===
The Jets were ranked 12th in the NFL in total offense and finished tied with Philadelphia for 10th in total defense.

Week	Date	Opponent	Result	Record	Venue	Recap
1	September 3	at Green Bay Packers	**W** 20–16	1–0	Lambeau Field	Recap
2	September 11	**New England Patriots**	**W** 20–19	2–0	Giants Stadium	Recap
3	September 17	**Buffalo Bills**	**W** 27–14	3–0	Giants Stadium	Recap
4	September 24	at Tampa Bay Buccaneers	**W** 21–17	4–0	Raymond James Stadium	Recap
5	Bye					
6	October 8	Pittsburgh Steelers	**L** 3–20	4–1	Giants Stadium	Recap
7	October 15	at **New England Patriots**	**W** 34–17	5–1	Foxboro Stadium	Recap
8	October 23	**Miami Dolphins**	**W** 40–37 (OT)	6–1	Giants Stadium	Recap
9	October 29	at **Buffalo Bills**	**L** 20–23	6–2	Ralph Wilson Stadium	Recap
10	November 5	Denver Broncos	**L** 23–30	6–3	Giants Stadium	Recap
11	November 12	at **Indianapolis Colts**	**L** 15–23	6–4	RCA Dome	Recap
12	November 19	at **Miami Dolphins**	**W** 20–3	7–4	Pro Player Stadium	Recap
13	November 26	Chicago Bears	**W** 17–10	8–4	Giants Stadium	Recap
14	December 3	**Indianapolis Colts**	**W** 27–17	9–4	Giants Stadium	Recap
15	December 10	at Oakland Raiders	**L** 7–31	9–5	Network Associates Coliseum	Recap
16	December 17	Detroit Lions	**L** 7–10	9–6	Giants Stadium	Recap
17	December 24	at Baltimore Ravens	**L** 20–34	9–7	PSINet Stadium	Recap
Note: Intra-division opponents are in **bold** text.

=== Standings ===
AFC East
	W	L	T	PCT	PF	PA	STK
^{(3)} Miami Dolphins	11	5	0	.688	323	226	W1
^{(6)} Indianapolis Colts	10	6	0	.625	429	326	W3
New York Jets	9	7	0	.563	321	321	L3
Buffalo Bills	8	8	0	.500	315	350	W1
New England Patriots	5	11	0	.313	276	338	L1

=== Best performances ===
- Curtis Martin, Week 14, 203 Rushing Yards vs. Indianapolis (Franchise Record)
- Richie Anderson, Week 8, 109 Rushing Yards vs. Miami
- Richie Anderson, Week 15, 103 Rushing Yards vs. Oakland
- Wayne Chrebet, Week 8, 104 Receiving Yards vs. Miami
- Wayne Chrebet, Week 11, 140 Receiving Yards vs. Indianapolis
- Laveranues Coles, Week 9, 131 Receiving Yards vs. Buffalo
- Vinny Testaverde, Week 8, 378 Passing Yards vs. Miami Dolphins
- Vinny Testaverde, Week 17, 481 Passing Yards vs. Baltimore Ravens
- Dedric Ward, Week 1, 104 Receiving Yards vs. Green Bay
- Dedric Ward, Week 2, 100 Receiving Yards vs. New England

=== Statistics ===
- NFL leader, passes attempted, 637 passes
- NFL leader (tied), times sacked, 20

== Awards and records ==
- Bryan Cox, AFC Defensive Player of the Week, week 14
- Mo Lewis, AFC Defensive Player of the Week, week 7
- Curtis Martin, AFC Offensive Player of the Month, September

== See also ==
- The Monday Night Miracle (Week 8 game)
