= 2004 All-Pro Team =

Official list of the best NFL players in 2004

The 2004 All-Pro Team was composed of the National Football League players that were named to the Associated Press, Pro Football Writers Association, and The Sporting News All-Pro Teams in 2004. Both first and second teams are listed for the AP team. These are the three teams that are included in Total Football II: The Official Encyclopedia of the National Football League. In 2004, the Pro Football Writers Association and Pro Football Weekly combined their All-Pro teams, a practice with continues through 2008. In 2004, the AP reinstated the “Fullback” position.

== Teams ==
Offense
Position	First team	Second team
Quarterback	Peyton Manning, Indianapolis Colts (AP, PFWA, TSN)	
Running back	LaDainian Tomlinson, San Diego Chargers (AP); Curtis Martin, New York Jets (AP, PFWA, TSN); Shaun Alexander, Seattle Seahawks (PFWA); Edgerrin James, Indianapolis Colts (TSN)	Shaun Alexander, Seattle Seahawks (AP-2); Edgerrin James, Indianapolis Colts (AP-2)
Fullback	William Henderson, Green Bay Packers (AP)	Tony Richardson, Kansas City Chiefs (AP-2)
Wide receiver	Muhsin Muhammad, Carolina Panthers (AP, PFWA); Terrell Owens, Philadelphia Eagles (AP, PFWA, TSN); Marvin Harrison, Indianapolis Colts (TSN)	Hines Ward, Pittsburgh Steelers (AP-2); Marvin Harrison, Indianapolis (AP-2)
Tight end	Antonio Gates, San Diego Chargers (AP, PFWA, TSN)	Tony Gonzalez, Kansas City Chiefs (AP-2)
Tackle	Walter Jones, Seattle Seahawks (AP, PFWA, TSN); Willie Roaf, Kansas City Chiefs (AP-t, PFWA); Willie Anderson, Cincinnati Bengals (AP-t); Orlando Pace, St. Louis Rams (TSN)	Jonathan Ogden, Baltimore Ravens (AP-2)
Guard	Alan Faneca, Pittsburgh Steelers (AP, PFWA, TSN); Brian Waters, Kansas City Chiefs (AP, PFWA, TSN)	Steve Hutchinson, Seattle Seahawks (AP-2); Will Shields, Kansas City Chiefs (AP-2)
Center	Jeff Hartings, Pittsburgh Steelers (AP, TSN); Kevin Mawae, New York Jets (PFWA)	Kevin Mawae, New York Jets, (AP-2)

Special teams
Position	First team	Second team
Kicker	Adam Vinatieri, New England Patriots (AP, PFWA, TSN)	David Akers, Philadelphia Eagles (AP-2)
Punter	Shane Lechler, Oakland Raiders (AP, PFWA, TSN)	Brad Maynard, Chicago Bears (AP-2)
Kick Returner	Eddie Drummond, Detroit Lions (AP); Terrence McGee, Buffalo Bills (PFWA, TSN)	Terrence McGee, Buffalo Bills (AP-2)
Punt Returner	Eddie Drummond, Detroit Lions (PFWA, TSN)	
Special Teams	Larry Izzo, New England Patriots (PFWA)	

Defense
Position	First team	Second team
Defensive end	Dwight Freeney, Indianapolis Colts (AP, PFWA, TSN); Julius Peppers, Carolina Panthers (AP, PFWA, TSN)	Bertrand Berry, Arizona Cardinals (AP-2); Patrick Kerney, Atlanta Falcons (AP-2)
Defensive tackle	Kevin Williams, Minnesota Vikings (AP, PFWA, TSN); Richard Seymour, New England Patriots (AP, PFWA, TSN)	Shaun Rogers, Detroit Lions (AP-2); Jamal Williams, San Diego Chargers (AP-2)
Inside linebacker	James Farrior, Pittsburgh Steelers (AP, PFWA, TSN); Ray Lewis, Baltimore Ravens (AP, TSN)	Tedy Bruschi, New England Patriots (AP-2); Donnie Edwards, San Diego Chargers (AP-2)
Outside linebacker	Takeo Spikes, Buffalo Bills (AP, PFWA, TSN); Derrick Brooks, Tampa Bay Buccaneers (AP, PFWA)	Joey Porter, Pittsburgh Steelers (AP-2); Keith Brooking, Atlanta Falcons (AP-2)
Cornerback	Champ Bailey, Denver Broncos (AP, PFWA, TSN); Rondé Barber, Tampa Bay Buccaneers (AP-t); Lito Sheppard, Philadelphia Eagles (AP-t, PFWA); Chris McAlister, Baltimore Ravens (TSN)	Chris McAlister, Baltimore Ravens (AP-2)
Safety	Brian Dawkins, Philadelphia Eagles (AP, PFWA, TSN); Ed Reed, Baltimore Ravens (AP, PFWA, TSN)	Rodney Harrison, New England Patriots (AP-2); Troy Polamalu, Pittsburgh Steelers (AP-2)

== Key ==
- AP = Associated Press first-team All-Pro
- AP-2 = Associated Press second-team All-Pro
- PFWA = Pro Football Writers Association All-NFL
- TSN = The Sporting News All-Pro
