= Jeff Burris =

American football player and coach (born 1972)

Personal information
- Born: June 6, 1972 (age 54); Rock Hill, South Carolina, U.S.
- Listed height: 6 ft 0 in (1.83 m)
- Listed weight: 190 lb (86 kg)

Career information
- Position: Cornerback (No. 22, 20, 21)
- High school: Northwestern (Rock Hill)
- College: Notre Dame
- NFL draft: 1994: 1st round, 27th overall pick

Career history

Playing
- Buffalo Bills (1994–1997); Indianapolis Colts (1998–2001); Cincinnati Bengals (2002–2003); New England Patriots (2004)*
- * Offseason or practice squad member only

Coaching
- Sacramento Mountain Lions (2011) Defensive backs coach; UMass (2012) Cornerbacks coach; Miami Dolphins (2013–2015) Assistant defensive backs coach; Notre Dame (2016) Defensive analyst; Northern Iowa (2017) Defensive backs coach; Louisiana Tech (2018–2020) Cornerbacks coach; Louisiana (2021–2023) Cornerbacks coach; Louisiana Tech (2024) Co-defensive coordinator & safeties coach; New York Giants (2025) Cornerbacks coach

Awards and highlights
- PFWA All-Rookie Team (1994); Consensus All-American (1993)

Career NFL statistics
- Tackles: 536
- Interceptions: 19
- INT return yards: 302
- Touchdowns: 2
- Stats at Pro Football Reference

Jeffrey Lamar Burris (born June 6, 1972) is an American professional football coach and former player who was most recently the cornerbacks coach for the New York Giants of the National Football League (NFL). He played professionally in the NFL as a cornerback.

Burris played college football for the Notre Dame Fighting Irish, and was a consensus All-American. He was selected by the Buffalo Bills in the first round of the 1994 NFL draft, and he played professionally for the Bills, Indianapolis Colts and Cincinnati Bengals of the NFL.

== Early life ==
Burris was born in Rock Hill, South Carolina. He graduated from Northwestern High School in Rock Hill, where he played for the Northwestern Trojans high school football team.

== College career ==
While attending the University of Notre Dame, Burris played for the Notre Dame Fighting Irish football team from 1990 to 1993. He was the Irish's primary running back in their goal line jumbo package, rushing for 167 yards on 29 carries and 10 touchdowns and catching one pass for 3 yards and a touchdown. As a senior in 1993, he was recognized as a consensus first-team All-American as a defensive back.

== Professional career ==
The Buffalo Bills selected Burris in the first round (27th pick overall) of the 1994 NFL Draft. He played for the Bills from 1994 to 1997.

In his ten-year career, Burris played in 144 regular season games, started 119 of them, compiling 529 tackles, and 19 interceptions for 302 return yards and two touchdowns.

== NFL career statistics ==
Legend
	Led the league
**Bold**	Career high

=== Regular season ===
Year	Team	Games		Tackles				Interceptions				Fumbles			
Year	Team	GP	GS	Comb	Solo	Ast	Sck	Int	Yds	TD	Lng	FF	FR	Yds	TD
1994	BUF	16	0	16	13	3	0.0	2	24	0	24	0	**1**	0	0
1995	BUF	9	9	34	28	6	0.0	1	19	0	19	0	0	0	0
1996	BUF	15	15	50	41	9	0.0	1	28	0	28	**1**	**1**	0	0
1997	BUF	14	14	45	39	6	0.0	2	19	0	10	0	**1**	0	0
1998	IND	14	14	68	57	11	0.0	1	0	0	0	0	0	0	0
1999	IND	16	16	**84**	68	**16**	2.0	2	**83**	0	**55**	**1**	0	0	0
2000	IND	16	16	77	**69**	8	**3.0**	**4**	38	**1**	27	0	0	0	0
2001	IND	15	15	58	54	4	0.0	3	69	**1**	30	0	0	0	0
2002	CIN	16	13	64	52	12	0.0	1	5	0	5	0	**1**	**32**	0
2003	CIN	13	8	40	36	4	0.0	2	17	0	17	**1**	0	0	0
		144	120	536	457	79	5.0	19	302	2	55	3	4	32	0

=== Playoffs ===
Year	Team	Games		Tackles				Interceptions				Fumbles			
Year	Team	GP	GS	Comb	Solo	Ast	Sck	Int	Yds	TD	Lng	FF	FR	Yds	TD
1996	BUF	1	1	4	**4**	0	0.0	**1**	**38**	**1**	**38**	0	0	0	0
1999	IND	1	1	**5**	**4**	1	0.0	0	0	0	0	0	0	0	0
2000	IND	1	1	4	2	**2**	0.0	0	0	0	0	0	0	0	0
		3	3	13	10	3	0.0	1	38	1	38	0	0	0	0

== Coaching career ==
Burris began his coaching career in 2007 at Fishers High School in Fishers, IN, where he helped work on the technique of cornerbacks and safeties as well as installing a defensive scheme.

Burris joined the United Football League’s Sacramento Mountain Lions as the defensive backs coach in 2011, hired by former Minnesota Vikings and Arizona Cardinals coach Dennis Green. Burris stayed with the Mountain Lions through their 2011 campaign, finishing with a 2–3 record.

On March 5, 2012, Burris was announced as the cornerbacks coach for the UMass Minutemen, working under new head coach Charley Molnar. He coached the Minutemen for the 2012 season.

In 2013 it was announced that Burris would become the assistant defensive backs coach and defensive quality control coach for the Miami Dolphins. Burris was the assistant defensive backs coach/defensive quality control coach for the Miami Dolphins. On October 8, 2015, Jeff Burris was promoted to assistant defensive backs coach for the Dolphins.

On June 3, 2016, Burris was hired as a defensive analyst for his alma mater, the University of Notre Dame.

After leaving his alma mater, Burris spent the 2017 season coaching defensive backs at the Northern Iowa.

In the spring of 2018, Burris was hired by Skip Holtz as the Cornerbacks Coach at Louisiana Tech.

On February 7, 2025, the New York Giants hired Burris to serve as their cornerbacks coach. On January 21, 2026, it was announced that Burris would not be retained by the Giants on new head coach John Harbaugh's inaugural staff.
