= Bernard Whittington =

American football player (born 1971)

No. 95, 97
- Positions: Defensive end, defensive tackle

Personal information
- Born: August 20, 1971 (age 55); St. Louis, Missouri, U.S.
- Listed height: 6 ft 5 in (1.96 m)
- Listed weight: 290 lb (132 kg)

Career information
- High school: Hazelwood East (St. Louis)
- College: Indiana (1989–1993)
- NFL draft: 1994: undrafted

Career history
- Indianapolis Colts (1994–2000); Cincinnati Bengals (2001–2002)

Career NFL statistics
- Tackles: 376
- Sacks: 12
- Fumble recoveries: 5
- Stats at Pro Football Reference

Bernard Maurice Whittington (born August 20, 1971) is an American former professional football player who was a defensive end in the National Football League (NFL). He played college football for the Indiana Hoosiers before playing professionally with the Indianapolis Colts from 1994 to 2000 and for the Cincinnati Bengals from 2001 to 2002.

== NFL career statistics ==
Legend
**Bold**	Career high

=== Regular season ===
Year	Team	Games		Tackles				Interceptions				Fumbles			
Year	Team	GP	GS	Comb	Solo	Ast	Sck	Int	Yds	TD	Lng	FF	FR	Yds	TD
1994	IND	13	8	36	22	14	0.0	0	0	0	0	**1**	0	0	0
1995	IND	16	13	48	32	16	2.0	0	0	0	0	**1**	1	0	0
1996	IND	16	14	**66**	**46**	**20**	3.0	0	0	0	0	**1**	0	0	0
1997	IND	15	6	45	35	10	0.0	0	0	0	0	0	0	0	0
1998	IND	15	11	49	39	10	**4.0**	0	0	0	0	0	**2**	0	0
1999	IND	15	15	33	27	6	1.0	0	0	0	0	0	0	0	0
2000	IND	15	12	42	31	11	1.0	0	0	0	0	0	0	0	0
2001	CIN	16	5	21	17	4	0.0	0	0	0	0	0	0	0	0
2002	CIN	16	11	36	22	14	1.0	0	0	0	0	0	**2**	0	0
		137	95	376	271	105	12.0	0	0	0	0	3	5	0	0

=== Playoffs ===
Year	Team	Games		Tackles				Interceptions				Fumbles			
Year	Team	GP	GS	Comb	Solo	Ast	Sck	Int	Yds	TD	Lng	FF	FR	Yds	TD
1995	IND	3	3	7	5	**2**	0.0	0	0	0	0	0	0	0	0
1996	IND	1	1	**8**	**6**	**2**	0.0	0	0	0	0	0	0	0	0
1999	IND	1	1	6	**6**	0	0.0	0	0	0	0	0	0	0	0
2000	IND	1	1	2	0	**2**	**0.5**	0	0	0	0	0	0	0	0
		6	6	23	17	6	0.5	0	0	0	0	0	0	0	0
