= Larry Chester =

American football player (born 1975)

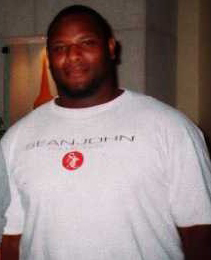
- Chester with the Dolphins in 2002

No. 64
- Position: Defensive tackle

Personal information
- Born: October 17, 1975 (age 51); Hammond, Louisiana, U.S.
- Listed height: 6 ft 2 in (1.88 m)
- Listed weight: 325 lb (147 kg)

Career information
- High school: Hammond
- College: Temple
- NFL draft: 1998: undrafted

Career history
- Indianapolis Colts (1998–2000); Carolina Panthers (2001); Miami Dolphins (2002–2004)

Awards and highlights
- PFWA All-Rookie Team (1998); Second-team All-Big East (1997)

Career NFL statistics
- Tackles: 198
- Sacks: 8.5
- Forced fumbles: 5
- Stats at Pro Football Reference

Larry Travis Chester (born October 17, 1975) is an American former professional football player who was a defensive tackle in the National Football League (NFL).

After playing college football for the Temple Owls, Chester signed with the Indianapolis Colts as an undrafted free agent in 1998, and stayed with the Colts organization until 2000. He was picked up by Carolina Panthers for a season, then played with the Miami Dolphins for another three seasons.

== NFL career statistics ==
Legend
| **Bold** | Career high |

| Year | Team | Games | | Tackles | | | | Interceptions | | | | Fumbles | | | |
| Year | Team | GP | GS | Comb | Solo | Ast | Sck | Int | Yds | TD | Lng | FF | FR | Yds | TD |
|---|---|---|---|---|---|---|---|---|---|---|---|---|---|---|---|
| 1998 | IND | 14 | 2 | 23 | 20 | 3 | **3.0** | 0 | 0 | 0 | 0 | **1** | 0 | 0 | 0 |
| 1999 | IND | 16 | 8 | **40** | **30** | 10 | 1.0 | 0 | 0 | 0 | 0 | 0 | **1** | 0 | 0 |
| 2000 | IND | 16 | 0 | 16 | 10 | 6 | 2.5 | 0 | 0 | 0 | 0 | 0 | **1** | 0 | 0 |
| 2001 | CAR | 11 | 5 | 37 | 27 | 10 | 0.5 | 0 | 0 | 0 | 0 | 0 | **1** | 0 | 0 |
| 2002 | MIA | 16 | 16 | 37 | 26 | 11 | 1.5 | 0 | 0 | 0 | 0 | 0 | **1** | 0 | 0 |
| 2003 | MIA | 15 | 15 | 38 | 20 | **18** | 0.0 | 0 | 0 | 0 | 0 | 0 | **1** | 0 | 0 |
| 2004 | MIA | 2 | 2 | 7 | 7 | 0 | 0.0 | 0 | 0 | 0 | 0 | **1** | 0 | 0 | 0 |
| | | 90 | 48 | 198 | 140 | 58 | 8.5 | 0 | 0 | 0 | 0 | 2 | 5 | 0 | 0 |
