= Paul Miranda =

American football player (born 1976)

No. 21, 22
- Position: Cornerback

Personal information
- Born: May 2, 1976 (age 50); Brooklyn, New York, U.S.

Career information
- High school: Thomas County Central (Thomasville, Georgia)
- College: UCF
- NFL draft: 1999: 4th round, 96th overall pick

Career history
- Indianapolis Colts (1999); Seattle Seahawks (2000); San Francisco 49ers (2000)*; Seattle Seahawks (2000-2001); Miami Dolphins (2002); Oakland Raiders (2003)*
- * Offseason or practice squad member only

Career NFL statistics
- Games played-started: 16-2
- Tackles: 15
- Fumble recoveries: 1
- Stats at Pro Football Reference

Paul Nathaniel Miranda (born May 2, 1976) is an American former professional football player who was a cornerback in the National Football League (NFL). He was selected by the Indianapolis Colts in the fourth round (96th overall) of the 1999 NFL draft and also played for the Seattle Seahawks and Miami Dolphins. He played college football for the UCF Knights.
