= Tony Scott (American football) =

American football player (born 1976)

No. 27
- Position: Defensive back

Personal information
- Born: October 3, 1976 (age 50); Lawndale, North Carolina, U.S.
- Listed height: 5 ft 10 in (1.78 m)
- Listed weight: 193 lb (88 kg)

Career information
- High school: Burns (Lawndale); Hargrave Military Academy (Chatham, Virginia)
- College: NC State (1996–1999)
- NFL draft: 2000: 6th round, 179th overall pick

Career history
- New York Jets (2000–2001); New England Patriots (2002)*; Seattle Seahawks (2003)*; Colorado Crush (2004); Nashville Kats (2005); Colorado Crush (2006); (2007); Dallas Desperados {2006); Grand Rapids Rampage (2007); Cleveland Gladiators (2008)
- * Offseason or practice squad member only

Awards and highlights
- Second-team All-ACC (1999)

Career NFL statistics
- Games played: 23
- Stats at Pro Football Reference
- Stats at ArenaFan.com

Anthony M. Scott (born October 3, 1976) is an American former professional football player who was a cornerback in the National Football League (NFL). He played college football for the NC State Wolfpack. He was selected by the New York Jets in the sixth round of the 2000 NFL draft and played for the Jets from 2000 to 2001.

== College career ==
After playing high school football at Burns High School in Lawndale, North Carolina, Scott had a brief stint at Hargrave Military Academy before becoming a starter for the Wolfpack at North Carolina State University. As a freshman, Scott had an interception for 30 yards as NC State finished a struggling 3–8. The next year, Scott had an interception for no return yards as the Wolfpack had a 6–5 season. Then as a junior, Scott had two interceptions for 36 yards leading NC State to a 7–5 record. Finally as a senior, Scott had four interceptions for 38 yards helping NC State finish the year with a 6–6 record. Scott finished his college career with eight interceptions for 104 yards and a 22–24 career record.

== Professional career ==
=== Draft ===
Scott entered the 2000 NFL draft and was selected in the sixth round by the New York Jets with the 179th pick.

=== Rookie season ===
Scott played in all 16 games as a rookie, totaling an interception for no yards, a fumble recovery and a tackle as the Jets finished 9–7 with no playoff appearance.

=== 2001 ===
In his second season, Scott only played seven games due to injuries and only had three tackles as the Jets went on to make the playoffs but lose in the wild card round. Scott soon retired after finishing his career with an interception, a fumble recovery and four tackles.
