= Edgerrin James =

American football player (born 1978)

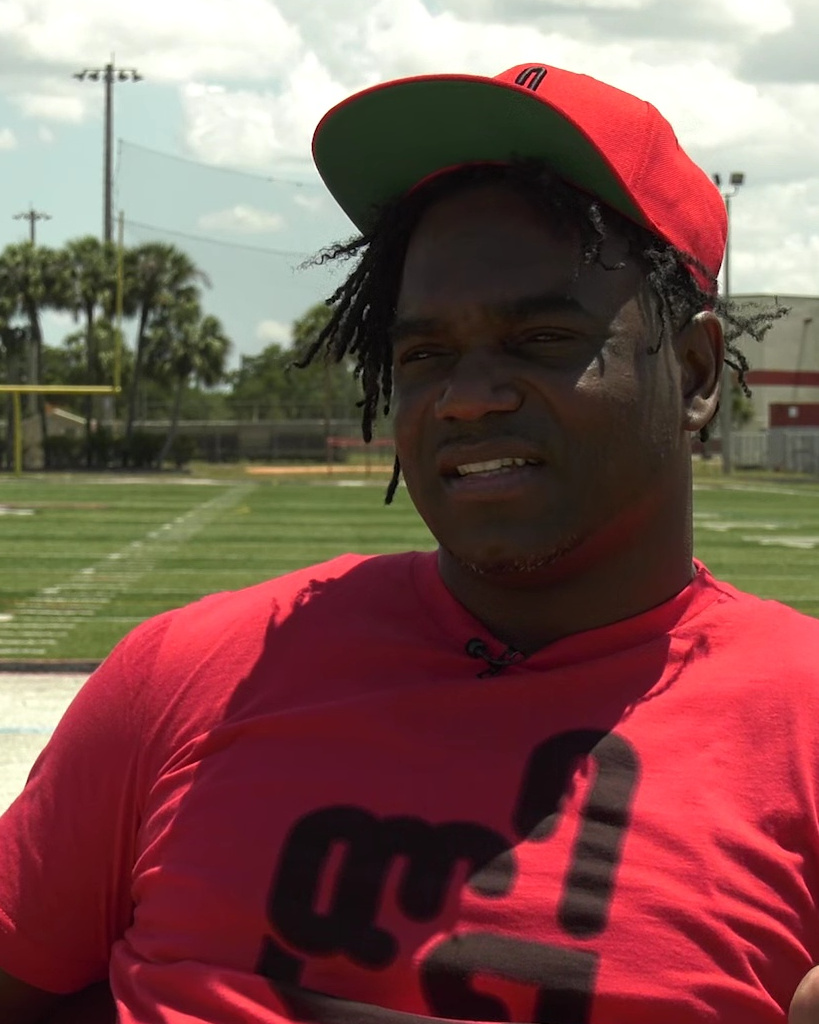
- James in 2021

No. 32
- Position: Running back

Personal information
- Born: August 1, 1978 (age 48); Immokalee, Florida, U.S.
- Listed height: 6 ft 0 in (1.83 m)
- Listed weight: 219 lb (99 kg)

Career information
- High school: Immokalee
- College: Miami (FL) (1996–1998)
- NFL draft: 1999: 1st round, 4th overall pick

Career history
- Indianapolis Colts (1999–2005); Arizona Cardinals (2006–2008); Seattle Seahawks (2009)

Awards and highlights
- NFL Offensive Rookie of the Year (1999); 3× First-team All-Pro (1999, 2000, 2004); 4× Pro Bowl (1999, 2000, 2004, 2005); 2× NFL rushing yards leader (1999, 2000); NFL 2000s All-Decade Team; NFL All-Rookie Team (1999); Indianapolis Colts Ring of Honor; First-team All-Big East (1998)

Career NFL statistics
- Rushing attempts: 3,028
- Rushing yards: 12,246
- Rushing touchdowns: 80
- Receptions: 433
- Receiving yards: 3,364
- Receiving touchdowns: 11
- Stats at Pro Football Reference
- Pro Football Hall of Fame

Edgerrin Tyree James (/ˈɛdʒərɪn/; born August 1, 1978) is an American former professional football running back who played in the National Football League (NFL) for 11 seasons, primarily with the Indianapolis Colts. He played college football for the Miami Hurricanes, receiving first-team All-Big East honors in 1998 and becoming the first player in school history to rush for more than 1,000 yards in consecutive seasons. James was selected fourth overall by the Colts in the 1999 NFL draft.

In his first season, James led the league in rushing yards, earning him AP NFL Offensive Rookie of the Year. James went on to lead the league in rushing yards a second time while receiving four Pro Bowl and three first-team All-Pro selections. Following seven seasons in Indianapolis, James spent his next three years with the Arizona Cardinals and was a member of the team that made the franchise Super Bowl debut in Super Bowl XLIII. In his final season, he was a member of the Seattle Seahawks.

Obtaining over 10,000 yards during his career, James ranks 14th in all-time rushing. James also holds the Colts' franchise record for career rushing yards. He was inducted to the Pro Football Hall of Fame in 2020.

== Early life ==
Edgerrin Tyree James was born on August 1, 1978, in Immokalee, Florida. He attended Immokalee High School.

== College career ==
James was recruited by the University of Miami. He proved to be one of the most successful running backs in the school's history.

James ranks third in all-time University of Miami rushing yards. He was the only running back in school history to post two consecutive seasons with 1,000-plus rushing yards, and he ranks first in school history with the most 100-plus rushing games (14). All single season records held by James have since been broken by former Baltimore Ravens running back Willis McGahee.

James was inducted into the University of Miami Sports Hall of Fame on April 23, 2009, at its 41st Annual Induction Banquet at Jungle Island in Miami.

== Professional career ==
Pre-draft measurables
Height	Weight	Arm length	Hand span	40-yard dash	10-yard split	20-yard split	20-yard shuttle	Three-cone drill	Wonderlic
6 ft 0 in (1.83 m)	216 lb (98 kg)	30 in (0.76 m)	8 7/8 in (0.23 m)	4.38 s	1.49 s	2.54 s	3.88 s	6.87 s	19
All values from NFL Combine

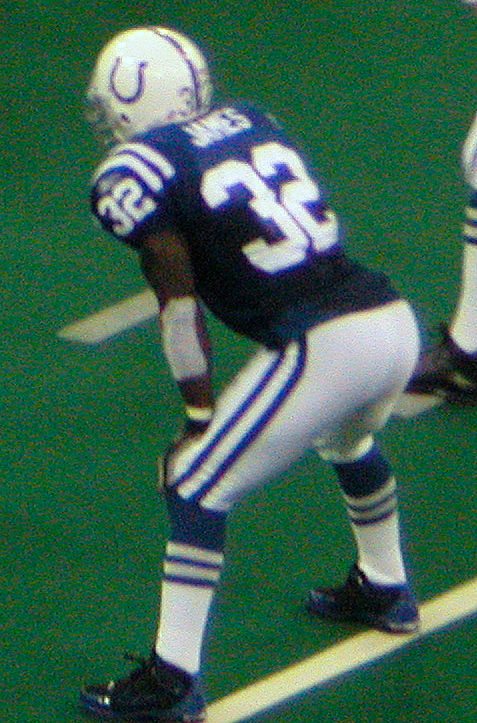
James with the Colts in 2004

=== Indianapolis Colts ===
The Indianapolis Colts selected James in the first round of the 1999 NFL draft as the fourth overall pick. James signed a seven-year, $49 million rookie contract. Some critics believed that the Colts made a mistake by choosing James over the reigning Heisman Trophy winner Ricky Williams.

James quieted the critics and was an immediate success, and was named the 1999 NFL Offensive Rookie of the Year by the Associated Press. James won the NFL rushing title in his first two seasons. He was the last NFL player to win the rushing title in his rookie season before Ezekiel Elliott. Six games into the 2001 season, he tore his ACL.

James had over 1,500 rushing yards in both the 2004 and 2005 seasons.

James left Indianapolis as its all-time leading rusher with 9,226 yards. After James's departure in March 2006, the Colts won Super Bowl XLI the following season. Although he was not on the team at the time, Colts owner Jim Irsay still sent him a Super Bowl ring.

On September 23, 2012, James was inducted into the Indianapolis Colts Ring of Honor during the week 3 game against the Jacksonville Jaguars.

=== Arizona Cardinals ===
James signed a four-year, $30 million deal with the Arizona Cardinals on March 23, 2006. With the retirement of Corey Dillon, James became the active leader in career rushing yards at the start of 2007, and remained so through his last game in November 2009 (though he would be passed by LaDainian Tomlinson by the end of the season). James went through a stretch of 10 games out of the 2008 season where he carried the ball only 20 times. Through this time, Ken Whisenhunt brought him in strictly as a pass protector. In week 17 against the Seattle Seahawks, James carried the ball 14 times for 100 yards. James said he would not come back to Arizona following the 2009 NFL playoffs, despite a year left on his contract. In the Cardinals' first playoff game since 1998, James averaged 4.6 yards per carry against the Atlanta Falcons in the Wild Card Round. In the Divisional Round of the playoffs, James rushed for 57 yards and a touchdown in the Cardinals' upset victory over the heavily favored Carolina Panthers. James rushed for 73 yards in the Cardinals' 32–25 win over the Philadelphia Eagles in the NFC Championship. James rushed 9 times for 33 yards in the Cardinals' 27–23 loss to the Pittsburgh Steelers in Super Bowl XLIII.

His long-time girlfriend, the mother of his children, died of cancer in April 2009. After this, he asked for his release from the team, and the Cardinals honored his request on April 28.

=== Seattle Seahawks ===
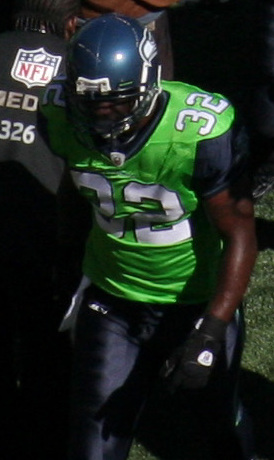
James with the Seahawks in 2009

After spending the 2009 offseason grieving with his four children and declining NFL offers, James finally agreed to a one-year, $2 million contract with the Seattle Seahawks on August 24, 2009, missing the team's training camp. The team released running back T. J. Duckett to make room for James on the roster. However, James rushed for only 125 yards on a career-low 46 carries. He played in only seven games, and on November 3, 2009, Seattle cut him from the team.

On July 26, 2011, James announced his retirement from professional football. He had amassed 12,246 rushing yards (11th all-time at the time of his last game in 2009) and 80 rushing touchdowns (15th).

=== Colts franchise records ===
- Most career rushing yards (9,226)
- Best career rushing yards per game average: 96.1
- Most seasons with 1,000 rushing yards (5)

== Career statistics ==
=== NFL ===
Legend
	Led the league
**Bold**	Career high

Year	Team	Games		Rushing					Receiving				
Year	Team	GP	GS	Att	Yds	Avg	Lng	TD	Rec	Yds	Avg	Lng	TD
1999	IND	**16**	**16**	369	1,553	4.2	**72**	**13**	62	586	**9.5**	54	4
2000	IND	**16**	**16**	**387**	**1,709**	4.4	30	**13**	**63**	**594**	9.4	**60**	**5**
2001	IND	6	6	151	662	4.4	29	3	24	193	8.0	27	0
2002	IND	14	14	277	989	3.6	20	2	61	354	5.8	23	1
2003	IND	13	13	310	1,259	4.1	43	11	51	292	5.7	17	0
2004	IND	**16**	**16**	334	1,548	**4.6**	40	9	51	483	9.5	56	0
2005	IND	15	15	360	1,506	4.2	33	**13**	44	337	7.7	20	1
2006	ARI	**16**	**16**	337	1,159	3.4	18	6	38	217	5.7	14	0
2007	ARI	**16**	**16**	324	1,222	3.8	27	7	24	204	8.5	26	0
2008	ARI	13	7	133	514	3.9	35	3	12	85	7.1	16	0
2009	SEA	7	0	46	125	2.7	10	0	3	19	6.3	7	0
Career		148	135	3,028	12,246	4.0	72	80	433	3,364	7.8	60	11

=== College ===
Season	Team	GP	Rushing				Receiving			
Season	Team	GP	Att	Yds	Avg	TD	Rec	Yds	Avg	TD
1996	Miami	7	71	446	6.3	2	6	90	15.0	0
1997	Miami	10	184	1,098	6.0	13	19	250	13.2	1
1998	Miami	11	242	1,416	5.9	17	17	255	15.0	2
Career		28	497	2,960	6.0	32	42	595	14.2	3

== Personal life ==
James resides in Miami, Florida. He has six children, four of them with his long-time girlfriend Andia Wilson:

- Qui James has a bachelor's degree from Howard University and a juris doctor from the University of the District of Columbia.
- Eyahna James is an R&B singer who goes by the stage name Eyahna J.
- Edgerrin "Jizzle" James Jr. is on the basketball team at UNC Charlotte.
- Euro James.

Andia Wilson died in 2009 from leukemia at the age of 30. Her death led to James's retirement from the NFL, so he could focus on raising his children. James's other children are:

- Eden James, a running back for Howard.
- Emani James, who attends North Carolina A&T.

Edgerrin James is the second cousin of LA Chargers safety Derwin James.
