= Chukie Nwokorie =

American football player (born 1975)

No. 91, 90
- Position: Defensive end

Personal information
- Born: July 10, 1975 (age 51); Tuskegee, Alabama, U.S.
- Listed height: 6 ft 3 in (1.91 m)
- Listed weight: 285 lb (129 kg)

Career information
- High school: Jefferson (Lafayette, Indiana)
- College: Purdue
- NFL draft: 1999: undrafted

Career history
- Indianapolis Colts (1999–2002); Green Bay Packers (2003–2004); Denver Broncos (2005)*; Las Vegas Gladiators (2006); Grand Rapids Rampage (2007)
- * Offseason or practice squad member only

Career NFL statistics
- Games played: 36
- Total tackles: 62
- Sacks: 7.5
- Forced fumbles: 2
- Fumble recoveries: 3
- Defensive touchdowns: 1
- Stats at Pro Football Reference

Career AFL statistics
- Total tackles: 35
- Sacks: 2
- Interceptions: 1
- Stats at ArenaFan.com

Chijioke Obinna "Chukie" Nwokorie (pronounced CHOO-key Wha-KOR-ee) (born July 10, 1975) is an American former professional football player who was a defensive end in the National Football League (NFL). Nworkorie played college football for the Purdue Boilermakers before earning a position in 1999 with the Indianapolis Colts as an undrafted free agent in 1999.

Nworkorie had a five-year career in the NFL, followed by a two-year stint in the Arena Football League (AFL). His final season of professional football came in 2007.

== Biography ==
=== Early life ===
Chukie Nwokorie was born July 10, 1975, in Tuskegee, Alabama, to parents who had immigrated to the United States from Nigeria, making him an American citizen by virtue of birth. He spent his first seven years in Alabama but was uprooted and taken to Nigeria at that age when his parents divorced. He would remain there, living in poverty, until he was 16.

As a teenager, Nwokorie was adopted by John and Patricia Stephenson of Lafayette, Indiana, adding him to the Stephenson family, which included three boys and a girl.

He played just two years high school football at Jefferson High School in Lafayette. He initially thought of becoming a placekicker. "My junior year, I said I was going to try football and be a kicker, because I'd always played soccer, he said. "That was the easiest thing — just kick the ball. When I started doing that, they wanted to work me other places. They tried me at fullback but that didn't work out — I kept dropping the ball."

Nwokorie was crafted into a defensive lineman. Despite his limited playing experience he still managed to achieve honorable mention for the Indiana All-State team in 1994. As a high school player for the Bronchos, Nwokorie notched 88 career tackles, with 8.5 sacks, four forced fumbles, and three fumble recoveries.

=== College career ===
He played college football at Purdue University where he was a four-year letter winner and a one-year starter.

Nwokorie was knocked out of the first two games by a knee injury during his senior season at Purdue, an injury which limited his production all year. This negatively affected his standing as an NFL prospect. He was not invited to the NFL Scouting Combine in Indianapolis and forced to rely upon private workouts for interested scouts.

Despite his relative lack of playing experience, his Purdue coaches considered Nwokorie an excellent prospect for the NFL. His defensive ends coach, Randy Melvin, said of Nwokorie: "He's a physical specimen. Background-wise, he's a tough kid and really knows how to work. He's the typo of guy you may not know about, but he's got a real good upside to him. Put a little more experience with it and you might have something."

=== NFL career ===
Nwokorie was not selected during the 1999 NFL draft, forcing him to enter the National Football League as an undrafted free agent. He signed a deal with the Indianapolis Colts in April 1999 as part of the post-draft frenzy of teams to add undrafted players to their preseason rosters. In addition to the Colts, the Pittsburgh Steelers, Cincinnati Bengals, and Chicago Bears expressed interest in bringing Nwokorie to training camp on a free agent deal. Although Indianapolis would seem to have been a simple and logical geographic choice for the adopted Hoosier Nwokorie, he stated that the decision to stay in Indiana was actually made by his agent on the basis of team need, with the Colts seen as the best opportunity among the four candidates for Nwokorie to make the team.

Nwokorie did win a place the Colts roster, one of four undrafted free agents to make the 53-man roster of head coach Jim Mora. The final cut had been nerve-wracking, with Nwokorie understanding himself to be "on the bubble." He told a journalist: "To tell the truth, I didn't really know if I'd make the squad or not. I came in Friday to practice and I was still looking to my left and looking to my right because of what I've seen so far of being through camp. Things change on a daily basis. So, I wasn't sure if I was part of the team."

The Colts saw Nwokorie a future prospect rather than a player ready to be inserted into an NFL starting lineup. He was hampered by his late exposure to the sport, not even watching football until his senior year of high school, and sometimes having difficulty with the complexity of defensive coordinator Vic Fangio's zone blitz scheme.

He only appeared in just three games during his first two years in the league. His first NFL game action came on November 7, 1999, when he was inserted for a few plays on special teams in the Colts' victory against the Kansas City Chiefs. Deemed too raw for NFL game action, Nwokorie spent most of his first two years on the team's inactive list.

In 2001 Nwokorie was made part of the Colts' regular defensive rotation, seeing action in all 16 games. He started at left defensive end six times, owing to injuries to teammates Chad Bratzke and Brad Scioli.

His career highlight came in the opening game of the 2001 season against the New York Jets. Nwokorie grabbed a fumble that bounced to him at his own 5-yard line. This led to a rumbling, stumbling 95-yard touchdown return swerving down the sideline abreast of Jets quarterback Vinny Testaverde, who was unable to put the massive Colt on the ground.

Nwokorie ended the 2001 season with 45 tackles and five sacks for the Colts.

Catastrophe soon followed. Late in the offseason ahead of the 2002 NFL campaign, Nwokorie injured a disc in his lower back that left him unable to play football. The injury placed Nwokorie on the Physically Unable to Perform list for the bulk of the season. He appeared in just three games in 2002 for new Colts head coach Tony Dungy, making just two tackles on the year.

Nwokorie became an unrestricted free agent at the end of the 2002 season and explored his options, visiting the facilities of the New York Giants and Green Bay Packers, with the Seattle Seahawks and Denver Broncos also reportedly expressing an interest. In April 2003, Nwokorie signed a contract with the Packers, a two-year deal paying him $2 million — with $500,000 of that amount paid up front as a signing bonus and an additional $300,000 on the contract in the form of possible incentive bonuses. According to his agent, Frank Murtha, the Packers had pursued Nwokorie for two years and the big defensive end had liked the idea of playing there. "He didn't necessarily take the biggest monetary offer," Murtha said. "He took the greatest opportunity to get on the field."

Nwokorie played a total of 14 games in a reserve role for Green Bay in 2003. His play there was mostly unmemorable, with Nwokorie generating 16 solo tackles (five of which were for a loss) and forcing one fumble. After an injury in training camp, Nwokorie was waived by the Packers on September 5, 2004, thereby terminating his contract ahead of the 2004 season. Nwokorie was unclaimed following his release by the Packers and found himself out of football completely at the age of 29.

In January 2005 Nwokorie signed a deal with the Denver Broncos as an unrestricted free agent.

=== Arena League career ===
Nwokorie played two seasons in the Arena Football League with the Las Vegas Gladiators (2006) and the Grand Rapids Rampage (2007).

=== Life after football ===
During 2004–2005 he took a position as an intern at WNOU, a local radio station in Indianapolis, working on a show called Morning Mess.

As of May 2016 he lived in Indianapolis, Indiana with his wife, Jamila and worked in business development.

As a more than four-year veteran of the NFL, Nwokorie is vested with the league and thereby entitled to be part of a health initiative under auspices of the National Football League Players' Association (NFLPA), the union of the league's players. The program, called "The Trust: Brain and Body," entails a complete two-day exam of body and brain in an effort to catch and address football-related medical situations. Nwokorie underwent the first of these in 2016, receiving a clean bill of health.

A second exam was scheduled for 2021 but was postponed due to the COVID-19 epidemic. In the interim, Nwokorie himself contracted the virus, which laid him up for about 10 days. With the NFLPA's medical program running again, Nwokorie went to the Cleveland Clinic in 2023 for his complete medical exam. He was shocked to learn that tests showed he was suffering from heart failure, with only 25% of the organ functioning properly. Dietary and lifestyle changes brought no improvement, forcing him to undergo open heart surgery to implant a dual chamber defibrillator in March 2024 in an effort to restore heart function.

Cost of the procedure topped $95,000, leading his friend and former Colts teammate Rick DeMulling to start a Go Fund Me campaign on Nworkorie's behalf. Nearly $20,000 was contributed during the first days of the campaign, with NFL Alumni chapters contributing $13,200 of this total.
