= Chad Bratzke =

American football player (born 1971)

No. 77, 92
- Position: Defensive end

Personal information
- Born: September 15, 1971 (age 55); Waukegan, Illinois, U.S.
- Listed height: 6 ft 5 in (1.96 m)
- Listed weight: 270 lb (122 kg)

Career information
- High school: Bloomingdale (Valrico, Florida)
- College: Eastern Kentucky
- NFL draft: 1994: 5th round, 155th overall pick

Career history
- New York Giants (1994–1998); Indianapolis Colts (1999–2003)

Career NFL statistics
- Tackles: 413
- Sacks: 56.5
- Fumble recoveries: 9
- Stats at Pro Football Reference

Chad Alan Bratzke (born September 15, 1971) is an American former professional football player who was a defensive end in the National Football League (NFL). He played college football for the Eastern Kentucky Colonels.

== College career ==
Bratzke played college football at Eastern Kentucky University. As a freshman, he totaled 47 solo tackles, 6 sacks, and 2 fumble recoveries. His career stats included 253 tackles (150 solo) and 27 sacks. In his senior year, he posted 87 tackles (57 solo), 11 sacks, and two fumble recoveries. He was named Ohio Valley Conference ("OVC") Defensive Player of the Year and Kodak All-American. He earned OVC All-Defense honors as a junior after totaling 71 tackles (36 solo), nine sacks and one fumble recovery.

== Professional career ==
Bratzke was selected in the fifth round of the 1994 NFL Draft. Over the course of his career, he spent ten seasons in the NFL, splitting his time evenly between the New York Giants and the Indianapolis Colts. He joined the Colts as an unrestricted free agent on March 1, 1999.

Bratzke recorded 48 of his 56.5 career sacks from 1998 onward. During his career, he posted 11 games with multiple sacks. His 12-sack performance in the 1999 season ranks among the seven double-digit sack seasons by an individual player in franchise history, alongside Dwight Freeney (13.0 in 2002), Johnie Cooks (11.5 in 1984), Vernon Maxwell (11.0 in 1983), Jon Hand (10.0 in 1989), Tony Bennett (10.5 in 1995), and Dan Footman (10.5 in 1997). He also recorded two three-sack games with the Colts, against Washington on December 19, 1999, and Denver on January 6, 2002.

Bratzke recorded four consecutive seasons with at least 80 tackles between 1998 and 2001, posting totals of 80, 81, 93, and 80, respectively, before finishing the 2002 season with 70 tackles. In 2002, he started all 16 games for a defense that ranked seventh in the NFL in points allowed and eighth overall. It marked the third time in four seasons with the franchise that he started every game in a single year.

He opened the 2002 season strongly, recording two sacks and five quarterback pressures in the first two games at Jacksonville and against Miami. That year, Bratzke totaled 70 tackles (49 solo), six sacks, 30 quarterback pressures, five forced fumbles, three batted passes, one pass defended, and one fumble recovery. He ranked second on the team in quarterback pressures and seventh in tackles, recording four or more tackles in 13 games.

His notable performances included six tackles, one sack, and one forced fumble at Jacksonville, followed by four solo tackles, one sack, and one forced fumble against Miami. He later added a sack against Baltimore in Week 6 and registered a sack and a forced fumble versus Dallas in Week 11. In Week 15 against Cleveland, he made his first career start at defensive tackle, recording six tackles, one sack, one forced fumble, and two quarterback pressures, including a key goal-line stop that helped the team rally from a 16-point deficit. He closed the season with six tackles, four of them solo, against New York in Week 16.

== NFL career statistics ==
Legend
**Bold**	Career high

=== Regular season ===
Year	Team	Games		Tackles				Interceptions				Fumbles			
Year	Team	GP	GS	Comb	Solo	Ast	Sck	Int	Yds	TD	Lng	FF	FR	Yds	TD
1994	NYG	2	0	0	0	0	0.0	0	0	0	0	0	0	0	0
1995	NYG	6	0	5	2	3	0.0	0	0	0	0	0	0	0	0
1996	NYG	16	16	52	43	9	5.0	0	0	0	0	0	**2**	0	0
1997	NYG	10	10	35	23	12	3.5	0	0	0	0	1	**2**	0	0
1998	NYG	16	16	**79**	**57**	**22**	11.0	0	0	0	0	1	1	0	0
1999	IND	16	16	48	34	14	**12.0**	0	0	0	0	**3**	1	**3**	0
2000	IND	16	16	64	46	18	7.5	0	0	0	0	1	1	0	0
2001	IND	15	15	60	45	15	8.5	0	0	0	0	1	1	0	0
2002	IND	16	16	45	34	11	6.0	0	0	0	0	0	1	0	0
2003	IND	16	3	25	16	9	3.0	0	0	0	0	1	0	0	0
		129	108	413	300	113	56.5	0	0	0	0	8	9	3	0

=== Playoffs ===
Year	Team	Games		Tackles				Interceptions				Fumbles			
Year	Team	GP	GS	Comb	Solo	Ast	Sck	Int	Yds	TD	Lng	FF	FR	Yds	TD
1999	IND	1	1	4	**4**	0	0.0	0	0	0	0	0	0	0	0
2000	IND	1	1	4	**4**	0	0.0	**1**	**4**	0	**4**	0	0	0	0
2002	IND	1	1	2	2	0	0.0	0	0	0	0	0	0	0	0
2003	IND	3	0	**7**	**4**	**3**	0.0	0	0	0	0	0	0	0	0
		6	3	17	14	3	0.0	1	4	0	4	0	0	0	0

== Personal life ==
Bratzke and his family moved to Florida when he was seven, and while there he attended Bloomingdale High School in Valrico, Florida. He has made sizable donations to Eastern Kentucky University to build the Student Athlete Academic Success Center. He is currently heavily involved with CLF (Childhood Leukemia Foundation) and Joy's House. He has made several appearances on Colts 2000 Care-A-Van tours.

== See also ==
- History of the New York Giants (1994-present)
