= Bertrand Berry =

American gridiron football player (born 1975)

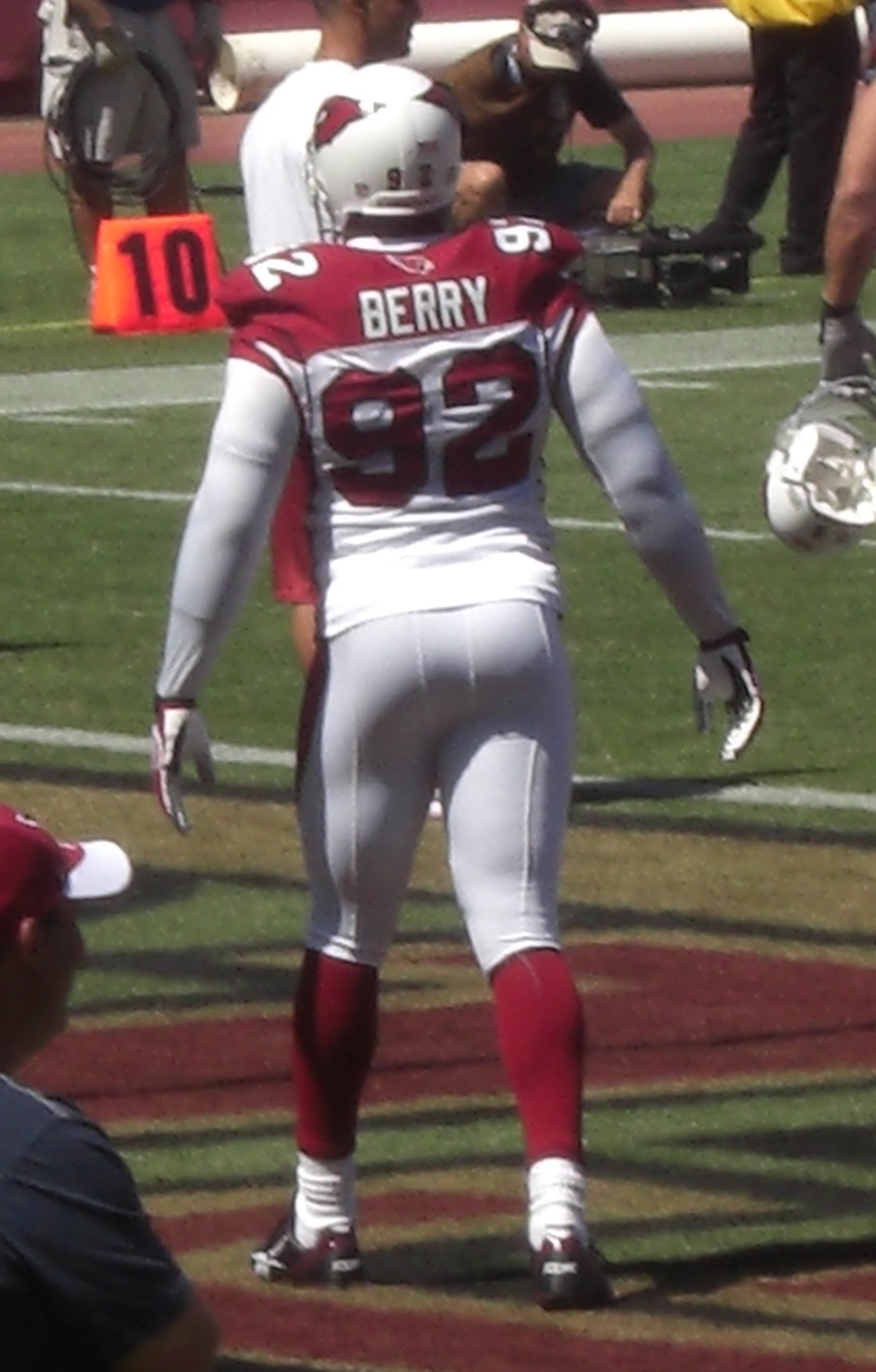
- Berry with the Arizona Cardinals in 2008

No. 57, 90, 92
- Position: Defensive end

Personal information
- Born: August 15, 1975 (age 51); Houston, Texas, U.S.
- Listed height: 6 ft 3 in (1.91 m)
- Listed weight: 254 lb (115 kg)

Career information
- High school: Humble (Humble, Texas)
- College: Notre Dame
- NFL draft: 1997: 3rd round, 86th overall pick

Career history
- Indianapolis Colts (1997–1999); St. Louis Rams (2000)*; Edmonton Eskimos (2000); Denver Broncos (2001–2003); Arizona Cardinals (2004–2009)
- * Offseason or practice squad member only

Awards and highlights
- Second-team All-Pro (2004); Pro Bowl (2004)

Career NFL statistics
- Tackles: 232
- Sacks: 65
- Forced fumbles: 14
- Fumble recoveries: 14
- Passes defended: 17
- Stats at Pro Football Reference

Bertrand Demond Berry (born August 15, 1975) is an American former professional football player who was a defensive end in the National Football League (NFL). He played college football for the Notre Dame Fighting Irish.

== Early life ==
Berry, whose nickname is "King" started his football career in the Humble Area Football League with the Cardinals as a running back.HAFL Berry attended Humble High School in Humble, Texas, and was a star running back for the Wildcats. where he was a three-sport standout in basketball, football, and track. In basketball, he was a two-time all-district selection, and in track, he threw the discus and set the school record for the shuttle hurdle relays.

== College career ==
Berry attended the University of Notre Dame and was a four-year letterman in football. He finished his NCAA football career with 187 tackles and 16.5 sacks.

== Professional career ==
Berry was selected by the Indianapolis Colts in the third round of the 1997 NFL draft, starting out as a linebacker before switching to defensive end. He spent most of his time there playing between defense and special teams, starting most of the games on defense. He signed with the St. Louis Rams in 2000, but was cut during training camp.

He signed with the Edmonton Eskimos of the Canadian Football League on September 26, 2000, on October 11 after seeing action in two games. He recorded one tackle in his two appearances.

By the 2003 season with the Denver Broncos, he was the starter at defensive end and led the team in tackles and sacks. He was picked up as a free agent by Arizona before the 2004 season, during which he was named as a starter to represent the NFC in the 2005 Pro Bowl.

On March 18, 2009, Berry agreed to a one-year contract.

On January 21, 2010, Berry announced his retirement from the NFL. He finished his career with 232 total tackles, 65 sacks and 13 forced fumbles.

=== NFL statistics ===
Year	Team	GP	COMB	TOTAL	AST	SACK	FF	FR
1997	IND	10	11	4	7	0.0	0	0
1998	IND	16	48	36	12	4.0	2	0
1999	IND	16	12	5	7	1.0	1	0
2001	DEN	14	20	18	2	2.0	0	2
2002	DEN	16	18	14	4	6.5	0	2
2003	DEN	16	36	24	12	11.5	3	1
2004	ARI	16	49	39	10	14.5	4	2
2005	ARI	8	33	25	8	6.0	1	1
2006	ARI	10	23	20	3	6.0	3	1
2007	ARI	9	21	17	4	2.5	0	1
2008	ARI	14	22	15	7	5.0	2	1
2009	ARI	15	10	9	1	6.0	0	2
Career		160	303	226	77	65.0	16	13

Key

- GP: games played
- COMB: combined tackles
- TOTAL: total tackles
- AST: assisted tackles
- SACK: sacks
- FF: forced fumbles
- FR: fumble recoveries

== Broadcasting career ==
In August 2011, Berry began hosting a radio show on The Fan AM 1060 KDUS in Phoenix called The Bertrand Berry Show with Mike Grose every weekday from 1:00 to 3:00. The show was cancelled effective December 28, 2012.

On April 23, 2015, Berry had a fill-in role for Ron Wolfley on the Doug and Wolf Show on Arizona Sports 98.7 FM, a local Arizona radio station. On August 3, Berry began hosting "Off the Edge with B-Train" on Arizona Sports 98.7 FM.
