= Ratcliff Thomas =

American football player (born 1974)

Profile
- Position: Linebacker

Personal information
- Born: January 2, 1974 (age 52)

Career information
- College: Maryland
- NFL draft: 1997: undrafted

Career history
- Carolina Panthers (1997)*; Indianapolis Colts (1998–2001); New England Patriots (2002)*
- * Offseason or practice squad member only

Career NFL statistics
- Tackles: 79
- Sacks: 0
- Interceptions: 1
- Stats at Pro Football Reference

Ratcliff Thomas (born January 2, 1974) is an American former professional football player who was a linebacker in the National Football League (NFL). He played college football for the Maryland Terrapins. He played four seasons in the NFL with the Indianapolis Colts (1998–2001) and appeared in 34 games. He totaled 24 defensive tackles, along with an interception (D. McNabb) also blocked the first punt in ten years to lead to Edgerrin James first professional touchdown.

During Thomas' tenure with Colts, he was named special teams captain. Usually used on special teams but he was a viable back up that played every LB position. Thomas also amassed 55 career special teams tackles, leading the Colts with a career-high 31 special team tackles during the 1999 season, also being named to Sports Illustrated All-Pro Team that same year and finished second on the club with 20 in 2000. He played in each of the Colts postseason games during the 1999 and 2000 campaigns, recorded numerous tackles on defense and two special teams.

Thomas attended T. C. Williams High School, where he was a two-sport star in both football and basketball. Basketball: The McDonald's All-American nominee finished on the top 5 scoring list in the school's history and appeared in the Capital Classic preliminary game. Thomas led his team to several District championships and play-off berths each of his three varsity seasons. Also named team's MVP, All-Region guard and Player of the Year in the city of Alexandria. Thomas received a Division-1 scholarship University of Maryland BC to play basketball, which he later reneged to play football.

Football: Thomas was a two-way starter, a 1,000-yard rusher at RB and as a LB was the Titans' best defensive player. Thomas led the Titans to several national rankings, as high as 9th in the country by USA Today, and an undefeated season as a junior that ended in a loss in the Regional Championship. He was named the state of Virginia Defensive Player of the Year. Thomas graduated in 1992, and his #29 jersey was retired in September 2000. He is also a member of the Fairfax Football Hall of Fame, the Alexandria Dream Team and was named the 46th greatest athlete of all time by a Northern VA publication.

Thomas attended Hargrave Military Academy, where he played in the postgraduate football program. Highly recruited as a linebacker, Thomas chose the University of Maryland, College Park.

A native of Alexandria, Virginia, Thomas was a four-year letterman at the University of Maryland, College Park. He was named to the Freshman All-American team alongside the likes of Ray Lewis. Thomas was the first player to lead the Terrapins in tackles for three consecutive seasons (E. J. Henderson and D'Qwell Jackson have since duplicated that feat). Thomas recorded 427 career tackles, the then third-highest (currently fifth-highest) total in school history. Also starting every game of his career at UMD.

In 2007, Thomas served as defense coordinator for his Alma mater T.C. Williams for several seasons. In 2010, Thomas became defense coordinator for the Edison Eagles High School football team in Alexandria, Virginia.
