= Rodregis Brooks =

American football player (born 1978)

No. 26
- Position: Cornerback

Personal information
- Born: August 30, 1978 (age 48); Alexander City, Alabama, U.S.

Career information
- College: UAB
- NFL draft: 2000: 7th round, 238th overall pick

Career history
- Indianapolis Colts (2000–2002)

Awards and highlights
- Second-team All-American (1999); C-USA Special Teams POY (1999)

Career NFL statistics
- Games: 5
- Tackles: 4
- Stats at Pro Football Reference

Rodregis Brooks (born August 30, 1978) is an American former professional football player who was a defensive back in the National Football League (NFL). He was selected by the Indianapolis Colts in the seventh round (238th overall) of the 2000 NFL draft after playing college football for the UAB Blazers. Brooks played a total of five games for the Colts in 2001 before washing out of the league.
