= Paul Shields (American football) =

American football player (born 1976)

No. 39
- Position: Running back

Personal information
- Born: January 31, 1976 (age 50); Camp Springs, Maryland, U.S.
- Listed height: 6 ft 1 in (1.85 m)
- Listed weight: 238 lb (108 kg)

Career information
- High school: Paradise Valley (Phoenix, Arizona)
- College: Arizona
- NFL draft: 1999: undrafted

Career history
- Indianapolis Colts (1999)*; Philadelphia Eagles (1999)*; Indianapolis Colts (1999–2000); Arizona Cardinals (2001)*; Kansas City Chiefs (2002)*
- * Offseason or practice squad member only
- Stats at Pro Football Reference

Paul Lamont Shields Jr. (born January 31, 1976) is an American former professional football running back who played two seasons with the Indianapolis Colts of the National Football League (NFL). He played college football at Scottsdale Community College and the University of Arizona.

== Early life and college ==
Paul Lamont Shields Jr. was born on January 31, 1976, in Camp Springs, Maryland. He attended Paradise Valley High School in Phoenix, Arizona.

Shields first played college football at Scottsdale Community College. He then transferred to play for the Arizona Wildcats of the University of Arizona, where he was a two-year letterman from 1997 to 1998. He caught two passes for 47 yards and one touchdown in 1997. Shields rushed 15 times for 51 yards in 1998 while also catching one pass for nine yards.

== Professional career ==
Shields signed with the Indianapolis Colts on April 22, 1999, after going undrafted in the 1999 NFL draft. He was released on September 6 and signed to the team's practice squad the next day. He was released by the Colts on September 14, 1999.

Shields was signed to the practice squad of the Philadelphia Eagles on September 21, 1999.

On September 29, 1999, Shields was signed to the Colts' active roster off of the Eagles practice squad. He played in 13 games, starting three, for the Colts during the 1999 season, catching four passes for 37 yards on seven targets while also posting four solo tackles. He also appeared in one playoff game that year, recording one solo tackle and one assisted tackle. Shields became a free agent after the season and re-signed with the Colts. He was released on August 28, 2000. He was re-signed on October 4, released on October 7, and re-signed again on October 9, 2000. Overall, Shields played in seven games for the Colts in 2000 and posted one solo tackle. He became a free agent after the 2001 season and was not offered a tender by the Colts.

Shields signed with the Arizona Cardinals on May 21, 2001. He was released by the Cardinals on September 2, 2001.

Shields was signed by the Kansas City Chiefs on January 16, 2002. He was released by the Chiefs on September 1, 2002.

== Personal life ==
Shields and his wife were accused of taking $1.4 million from a couple in a repossessed-home Ponzi scheme in 2012.
