= Phil Armour =

American football player (born 1976)

Phillip "Phil" Armour
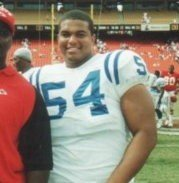
- Indianapolis Colts @ Kansas City Chiefs, c.2000

No. 54
- Position: Center

Personal information
- Born: December 9, 1976 (age 49); Geneva, Illinois, U.S.
- Listed height: 6 ft 3 in (1.91 m)
- Listed weight: 318 lb (144 kg)

Career information
- College: North Texas
- NFL draft: 1999: undrafted

Career history
- Indianapolis Colts (1999–2000)

Awards and highlights
- First-team All-Big West (1996, 1997, 1998); UNT Athletics Hall of Fame
- Stats at Pro Football Reference

Phillip Armour (born December 9, 1976) is an American former professional football player who was a center for the Indianapolis Colts of the National Football League (NFL). He played college football for the North Texas Mean Green.

Armour accepted a full football scholarship from the University of North Texas (Denton, TX) in January 1995. After starting for 4 years at UNT, Armour signed with the Indianapolis as an undrafted free agent immediately after the 1999 NFL Draft. After being injured in his first training camp with the Colts and being placed on injured reserve for the entire 1999 season, Armour made the Colts' 53-man roster for the 2000 season. He was released by the Colts in April 2001, and retired from professional football in 2003.

== Early life ==
Armour was born in Geneva, IL, to Corin J. Armour and Joe C. Armour. He lived in the suburbs of Chicago until 2nd-Grade, when his mother relocated he and his sister (Sonja F. Clay, née Armour) to Frisco, TX, to live with their maternal grandparents. Armour, his sister and his mother then moved to Denton, TX, a year later to begin 3rd-Grade. Armour attended Evers Park Elementary for 3rd and 4th-Grade, Hodges Elementary for 5th and 6th-Grade, Strickland Middle School for 7th-thru-9th-Grade, and Denton High School for 10th-thru-12th-Grade; he graduated from DHS in May 1995.

Denton High School (Denton, TX) #66; District 5-5A

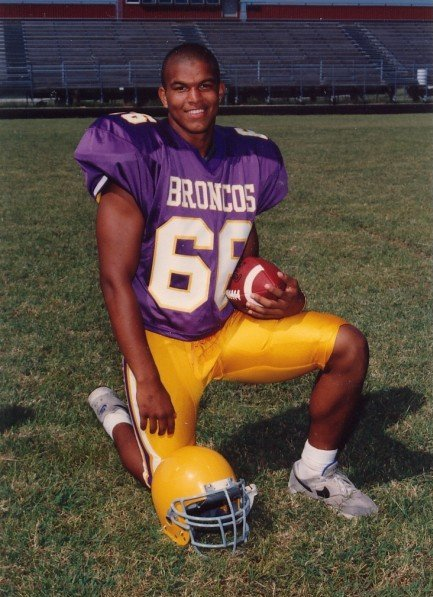
Armour Senior Year at Denton High School, Aug.1994

- Sophomore Year (1992 season) - Armour started at Defensive Tackle; 44 tackles and 3 sacks.
- Junior Year (1993 season) - Armour started at Defensive Tackle and Offensive Center; 83 tackles and 10 sacks; earned 2nd-Team All-District honors at DT; earned Denton Record Chronicle 1st-Team All-Area honors at DT.
- Senior Year (1994 season) - Armour started at Inside Linebacker and Offensive Center; 110 tackles and 13 sacks; earned 2nd-Team All-District honors at LB.

Armour visited five Division-I schools before committing to UNT: North Carolina State University, University of Kansas, Southern Methodist University, Colorado State University, and The University of North Texas.

== College ==
The University of North Texas (Denton, TX) #67; NCAA Div. I; Independent/Big West Conference

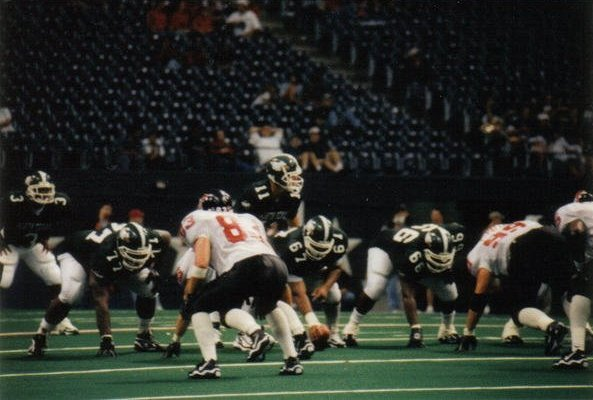
Armour (#67) vs Texas Tech University, Sep.1998

- Freshman Year (1995 season) - Armour started at Defensive End for the first 5 games; 14 tackles and 1 sack; after suffering a fractured neck vs. Oklahoma in the 4th game of the season, Armour played 1 play vs. University of Nevada in the 5th game before re-injuring himself and being held out the remainder of his Freshman season; he was moved to Offensive Center during the offseason.
- Sophomore Year (1996 season) - Armour started at Offensive Center all 11 games; earned 1st-Team All Big West Center
- Junior Year (1997 season) - Armour started at Offensive Center all 11 games; earned 1st-Team All Big West Center
- Senior Year (1998 season) - Armour started at Offensive Center all 11 games; earned 1st-Team All Big West Center—becoming the first UNT player in 30 years to earn 1st-Team All-Conference Honors 3 years in a row since Mean Joe Greene accomplished that feat during his playing years of 1965-1968

Armour was invited to, and played in, two post-season all-star games following his Senior year at UNT:

74th-Annual East-West Shrine Game in Stanford, CA, at Stanford Stadium on January 16, 1999.

53rd-Annual Hooters Hula Bowl in Maui, HI, at War Memorial Stadium on January 23, 1999.

Armour went undrafted in the 1999 NFL draft, and signed with the Indianapolis Colts as an Undrafted Free Agent immediately after the draft ended. He signed his NFL rookie contract on May 21, 1999.

== NFL ==
Indianapolis Colts #54; AFC East Division

- 1999 Season (Rookie Year) - Armour placed on season-ending Injured Reserve in late-July after suffering a Lisfranc Dislocation of his left foot during a joint practice vs. the St. Louis Rams in training camp.
- 2000 Season (2nd Year -- 1st Accrued Season) - Armour made the 53-man Active Roster as a backup Offensive Center to Jeff Saturday; he was active for all 16 regular season games, and the 1 playoff game; he saw action in 3 games during the 2000 NFL season:

November 12 vs. New York Jets; November 19 @ Green Bay Packers; November 26 vs. Miami Dolphins

Armour was released from the Indianapolis Colts during the offseason on April 21, 2001. He officially retired from the NFL in January 2003.

== Personal life ==
As of 2016, Armour has two sons, Blaise M. Armour (born January 26, 2002) and Major S. Armour (born December 27, 2015), and lives with his wife (Hailey R. Armour, née Miele—married on October 28, 2015) and children in Leander, TX. He has been a Sales Executive for Avant Technology in Pflugerville, TX, since July 15, 2002.
