= Isaac Jones (American football) =

American football player (born 1975)

No. 15
- Position: Wide receiver

Personal information
- Born: December 7, 1975 (age 50); Little Rock, Arkansas, U.S.
- Listed height: 6 ft 0 in (1.83 m)
- Listed weight: 190 lb (86 kg)

Career information
- High school: Wallingford (PA) Strath Haven
- College: Purdue
- NFL draft: 1999: undrafted

Career history
- Indianapolis Colts (1999–2000); Philadelphia Eagles (2001)*; Indianapolis Colts (2001)*
- * Offseason or practice squad member only

Career NFL statistics
- Receptions: 1
- Receiving yards: 8
- Stats at Pro Football Reference

Isaac Douglas Jones (born December 7, 1975) is an American former professional football player who was a wide receiver in the National Football League (NFL). He was signed Indianapolis Colts as an undrafted free agent in 1999. He played college football for the Purdue Boilermakers.

Isaac was selected to lead "Shout" during the Missouri vs. Purdue game on September 15, 2018.
