= Terrence Wilkins =

American gridiron football player (born 1975)

No. 80, 81, 82, 10
- Position: Wide receiver

Personal information
- Born: July 29, 1975 (age 51); Washington, D.C., U.S.
- Listed height: 5 ft 10 in (1.78 m)
- Listed weight: 180 lb (82 kg)

Career information
- High school: Bishop Denis J. O'Connell (Arlington, Virginia)
- College: Virginia
- NFL draft: 1999: undrafted

Career history
- Indianapolis Colts (1999–2001); St. Louis Rams (2002); Carolina Panthers (2003)*; Indianapolis Colts (2003); Miami Dolphins (2004); Calgary Stampeders (2005); Indianapolis Colts (2006)
- * Offseason or practice squad member only

Awards and highlights
- Super Bowl champion (XLI); Led NFL in Non-Offensive TDs (1999) (3); NFL All-Rookie Team (1999)

Career NFL statistics
- Receptions: 124
- Receiving yards: 1,497
- Receiving touchdowns: 7
- Return yards: 6,398
- Return touchdowns: 4
- Stats at Pro Football Reference

Terrence Olondo Wilkins (born July 29, 1975) is an American former professional football player who was a wide receiver and return specialist for the Indianapolis Colts of the National Football League (NFL). He also played with St. Louis Rams, and was a preseason member of the Miami Dolphins in 2004 and also played with the Calgary Stampeders in the Canadian Football League (CFL) in 2005. He had 1,466 career receiving yards with the Colts, and was also part of the Super Bowl XLI team during the 2006 season, beating the Chicago Bears.

Terrence Wilkins graduated from Bishop Denis J. O'Connell High School in Arlington, Virginia in 1994. Previously, he attended St. Stephen's and St. Agnes School in Alexandria, Virginia.

== College career ==
Wilkins played college football at the University of Virginia. After spending his freshman season as a backup running back, he converted to wide receiver. Despite his small size (5'8 and 180 pounds), Wilkins excelled at this role. He finished his next three seasons with 97 receptions for 1,495 yards (5th in school history) and 5 touchdowns, while adding another 1,155 return yards on special teams. In his senior season, Wilkins led the team with 45 receptions for 811 yards, an average of 18 yards per catch.

== Professional career ==
Wilkins went undrafted and signed with the Colts as a free agent in 1999. He served as the team's starting returner for kickoffs and punts, and eventually made it into the starting lineup on offense as well, finishing third on the team in receiving, while racking up a total of 2,089 total yards. This set the record for most yards gained by an undrafted rookie, and made him one of only six rookies ever to gain more than 2,000 yards. He spent two more years with the Colts before being traded to the St. Louis Rams for a 6th-round draft pick. After spending 2003 back with the Colts, it would be three more years before he would play another regular season game. After a little time on the Miami Dolphins roster in 2004, Wilkins was out of the NFL until 2006, when he rejoined the Colts. At 31 years old, Wilkins put up a career high 1,297 kick return yards (9th in the NFL) and another 411 total return yards in Indianapolis' 4 playoff games. In the Colts 29-17 Super Bowl XLI victory, Wilkins returned 4 kicks for 89 yards and 3 punts for 42. It turned out to be his final NFL game.

== Career statistics ==
Terrence Wilkins – receiving statistics
Season	1999	2000	2001	2002	2003	2006
Receptions	42	43	34	5	0	0
Yards	565	569	332	31	0	0
Touchdowns	4	3	0	0	0	0
