= Josh Keur =

American football player (born 1976)

No. 83
- Position: Tight end

Personal information
- Born: September 4, 1976 (age 50); Muskegon, Michigan, U.S.
- Listed height: 6 ft 4 in (1.93 m)
- Listed weight: 280 lb (127 kg)

Career information
- High school: Orchard View
- College: Michigan State
- NFL draft: 1999: undrafted

Career history
- Indianapolis Colts (1999–2000); Cincinnati Bengals (2001)*
- * Offseason or practice squad member only

Awards and highlights
- Second-team All-Big Ten (1997)
- Stats at Pro Football Reference

Joshua Jacob Keur (born September 4, 1976) is an American former professional football player who was a tight end for the Indianapolis Colts of the National Football League (NFL). He played college football for the Michigan State Spartans. He never played in a regular season NFL game.
