= George Catavolos =

American football player and coach (born 1945)

George Catavolos (born May 8, 1945, in Chicago, Illinois), is an American football coach. He was a three-year letterman at Purdue and was the Boilermakers' co-captain during the team's 1967 Rose Bowl Championship season; his last-second interception of an attempted two-point conversion locked up the victory for the Boilermakers. He began coaching at Purdue in 1967 and spent 17 years in college coaching. He has coached in the National Football League for 28 seasons with the Indianapolis Colts for 11 years, the Carolina Panthers, the Washington Redskins, and the Buffalo Bills.

== Coaching career ==
- 1967–1968 Purdue (GA)
- 1969 Middle Tennessee (Assistant)
- 1970 Louisville (Assistant)
- 1971–1976 Purdue (Assistant)
- 1977–1981 Kentucky (Assistant)
- 1982–1983 Tennessee (DB)
- 1984–1993 Indianapolis Colts (DB)
- 1995–1997 Carolina Panthers (DB)
- 1998–2001 Indianapolis Colts (AHC)
- 2002–2003 Washington Redskins (DB)
- 2004–2005 Detroit Lions (DB)
- 2006–2011 Buffalo Bills (DB)
