= Waverly Jackson =

American football player (born 1972)

No. 74
- Position: Tackle/guard

Personal information
- Born: December 19, 1972 (age 53); South Hill, Virginia, U.S.
- Listed height: 6 ft 2 in (1.88 m)
- Listed weight: 315 lb (143 kg)

Career information
- High school: Park View (South Hill)
- College: Virginia Tech
- NFL draft: 1997: undrafted

Career history
- Carolina Panthers (1997)*; Indianapolis Colts (1998–2002)
- * Offseason or practice squad member only

Career NFL statistics
- Games played: 68
- Games started: 22
- Stats at Pro Football Reference

Waverly Arthur Jackson Jr. (born December 19, 1972) is an American former professional football player who was an offensive tackle and guard in the National Football League (NFL). He played college football for the Virginia Tech Hokies. He was signed by the Carolina Panthers as an undrafted free agent in 1997 and played for the Indianapolis Colts.
