= Tony Blevins =

American football player (born 1975)

No. 22, 26
- Position: Defensive back

Personal information
- Born: January 29, 1975 (age 51); Rockford, Illinois, U.S.
- Listed height: 6 ft 0 in (1.83 m)
- Listed weight: 165 lb (75 kg)

Career information
- High school: Rockhurst (Kansas City, Missouri)
- College: Kansas
- NFL draft: 1998: undrafted

Career history
- San Francisco 49ers (1998); Indianapolis Colts (1998–2000)

Awards and highlights
- Second-team All-Big 12 (1997)

Career NFL statistics
- Tackles: 111
- Sacks: 1
- Interceptions: 2
- Touchdowns: 1
- Stats at Pro Football Reference

Tony Blevins (born January 29, 1975) is an American former professional football player who was a cornerback for three seasons in the National Football League (NFL). He played college football for the Kansas Jayhawks.

In 1998, Blevins joined the San Francisco 49ers as a rookie free agent and was promoted to the active roster in early October. By the end of the month, he was released to make room for tackle Kirk Scrafford to return to the team.

From 1998 to 2000, he was with the Indianapolis Colts. In September 1999 against rivals Buffalo Bills, Blevins had an interception and 74-yard return, scoring a touchdown.
