= Mark Thomas (defensive end) =

American football player (born 1969)

No. 72, 95, 75, 90
- Position: Defensive end

Personal information
- Born: May 6, 1969 (age 57); Lilburn, Georgia, U.S.
- Listed height: 6 ft 5 in (1.96 m)
- Listed weight: 265 lb (120 kg)

Career information
- High school: Parkview (Lilburn)
- College: NC State
- NFL draft: 1992: 4th round, 89th overall pick
- Expansion draft: 1995: 5th round, 10th overall pick

Career history
- San Francisco 49ers (1992–1994); Carolina Panthers (1995–1996); Chicago Bears (1997–1998); Indianapolis Colts (1998–2001)

Awards and highlights
- Super Bowl champion (XXIX)

Career NFL statistics
- Tackles: 158
- Sacks: 27
- Fumble recoveries: 4
- Stats at Pro Football Reference

Mark Andrew Thomas (born May 6, 1969) is an American former professional football player who was a defensive end for 10 seasons in the National Football League (NFL) for the San Francisco 49ers, Carolina Panthers, Chicago Bears, and Indianapolis Colts. He played college football for the NC State Wolfpack and was selected in the fourth round of the 1992 NFL draft.
