= Billy Austin (American football) =

American football player (born 1975)

William Dominic "Billy" Austin
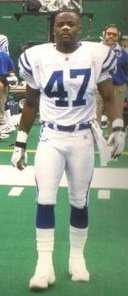

No. 47
- Position: Cornerback

Personal information
- Born: March 8, 1975 (age 51); Washington, D.C., U.S.
- Listed height: 5 ft 10 in (1.78 m)
- Listed weight: 195 lb (88 kg)

Career information
- High school: Kempner (Sugar Land, Texas)
- College: New Mexico
- NFL draft: 1998: undrafted

Career history
- St. Louis Rams (1998)*; Indianapolis Colts (1998–2000)
- * Offseason or practice squad member only

Career NFL statistics
- Tackles: 44
- Passes defended: 1
- Fumble recoveries: 1
- Stats at Pro Football Reference

William Dominic Austin (born March 8, 1975) is an American former professional football player who was a cornerback in the National Football League (NFL).

He graduated from Kempner High School in Sugar Land, Texas. He played college football at New Mexico. He attended the University of New Mexico from 1993 to 1997 and was an All-Conference defensive back his sophomore, junior, and senior years. He played for the Indianapolis Colts from 1998, 1999, 2000 and was a part of the AFC East Championship team in 1999.

He currently resides in Houston, Texas.

== After football ==
After being diagnosed with stage 4 cancer, Austin launched the Tackles 4 Cancer nonprofit. His mission to assist other cancer patients with transportation to and from their treatments served as the fundamental mission of the organization. Now cancer-free, he has hosted over 20 events with celebrities and was featured as an inspirational figure by Beyonce's BeGood Foundation.
