= Adam Meadows =

American football player (born 1974)

No. 73, 75
- Position: Offensive tackle

Personal information
- Born: January 25, 1974 (age 52); Powder Springs, Georgia, U.S.
- Listed height: 6 ft 5 in (1.96 m)
- Listed weight: 290 lb (132 kg)

Career information
- High school: McEachern
- College: Georgia
- NFL draft: 1997: 2nd round, 48th overall pick

Career history
- Indianapolis Colts (1997–2003); Carolina Panthers (2004)*; Denver Broncos (2006)
- * Offseason or practice squad member only

Awards and highlights
- Third-team Associated Press All-American (1996); First-Team All-SEC 1996

Career NFL statistics
- Games played: 106
- Games started: 99
- Fumble recoveries: 1
- Stats at Pro Football Reference

Jonathan Adam Meadows (born January 25, 1974) is an American former professional football player. He played college football for the Georgia Bulldogs.

== Early life and college ==
Meadows attended McEachern High School in Powder Springs, Georgia, and was a letterman in football and basketball. Meadows attended the University of Georgia and was a four-year member of the starting lineup in football.

== Professional career ==
Pre-draft measurables
Height	Weight	Arm length	Hand span	40-yard dash	10-yard split	20-yard split	20-yard shuttle	Vertical jump
6 ft 4 7/8 in (1.95 m)	297 lb (135 kg)	33 1/2 in (0.85 m)	9 3/4 in (0.25 m)	5.04 s	1.78 s	2.94 s	4.47 s	30.0 in (0.76 m)

Meadows was selected by the Indianapolis Colts in the 1997 NFL draft and retired after a shoulder injury. Meadows and his wife moved to Macon, Georgia, until 2006 when he made a comeback to the NFL by signing with the Denver Broncos.

== Coaching career ==
After retiring from the NFL, Meadows became an offensive and defensive line coach for the Prince Avenue Wolverines high school team in 2008. As of August 2019, he is the offensive line coach for the Mountain Brook Spartans in Birmingham, Alabama.
