= Tony McCoy (American football) =

American football player (born 1969)

No. 94, 61
- Position: Defensive tackle

Personal information
- Born: June 10, 1969 (age 57); Orlando, Florida, U.S.
- Listed height: 6 ft 1 in (1.85 m)
- Listed weight: 289 lb (131 kg)

Career information
- High school: Maynard Evans (Orlando)
- College: Florida
- NFL draft: 1992: 4th round, 105th overall pick

Career history
- Indianapolis Colts (1992–1999); Arizona Cardinals (2000)

Awards and highlights
- First-team All-SEC (1991)

Career NFL statistics
- Games played: 114
- Games started: 79
- Tackles: 327
- Sacks: 23
- Forced fumbles: 3
- Stats at Pro Football Reference

Anthony Bernard McCoy (born June 10, 1969) is an American former professional football player who was a defensive tackle for nine seasons in the National Football League (NFL) during the 1990s and early 2000s. McCoy played college football for the Florida Gators, and thereafter, he played in the NFL for the Indianapolis Colts and the Arizona Cardinals.

== Early life ==
McCoy was born in Orlando, Florida, in 1969. He attended Maynard Evans High School in Orlando, and played high school football for the Evans Trojans.

== College career ==
McCoy accepted an athletic scholarship to attend the University of Florida in Gainesville, Florida, where he played for coach Galen Hall and coach Steve Spurrier's Gators teams from 1988 to 1991. As a senior in 1991, McCoy was a key member of the Florida defense as the Gators won their first-ever official Southeastern Conference (SEC) football championship; he was recognized as a first-team All-SEC selection and an honorable mention All-American, and was selected by his fellow Gators as the team's most valuable player. He finished his college career with seventeen quarterback sacks.

McCoy returned to Gainesville after his NFL career was over and completed his bachelor's degree in sociology in 2001.

== Professional career ==
The Indianapolis Colts chose McCoy in the fourth round (105th pick overall) in the 1992 NFL draft. He played for the Colts for eight seasons from 1992 to 1999. He played his final NFL season for the Arizona Cardinals in 2000. In his nine-year NFL career, McCoy started seventy-nine of 114 games in which he played, and finished his professional career with twenty-three quarterback sacks and three recovered fumbles.

== Life after football ==
McCoy received his minister's license through the United Christian Church and Ministerial Association in 1996. He currently serves as the senior pastor of Hope International Church, a non-denominational Christian church located in Groveland, Florida.

== See also ==
- Florida Gators football, 1980–89
- Florida Gators football, 1990–99
- History of the Indianapolis Colts
- List of Florida Gators in the NFL draft
- List of University of Florida alumni
