= Larry Moore (American football) =

American football player (born 1975)

No. 72, 50
- Position: Guard

Personal information
- Born: June 1, 1975 (age 51); San Diego, California, U.S.
- Listed height: 6 ft 3 in (1.91 m)
- Listed weight: 300 lb (136 kg)

Career information
- High school: Monte Vista (Spring Valley, California)
- College: BYU
- NFL draft: 1997: undrafted

Career history

Playing
- Seattle Seahawks (1997)*; Washington Redskins (1997)*; Seattle Seahawks (1997)*; Indianapolis Colts (1998–2001); Washington Redskins (2002–2003); Cincinnati Bengals (2004–2005)
- * Offseason or practice squad member only

Coaching
- Bridgewater College (2008) Tight ends coach; Incarnate Word (2011–2014) Tight ends coach & academic coordinator; Incarnate Word (2015–2016) Running backs coach; Incarnate Word (2017) Offensive line coach; Central Catholic High School (2019-present) Offensive line coach

Career NFL statistics
- Games played: 96
- Games started: 73
- Fumble recoveries: 3
- Stats at Pro Football Reference

Larry Maceo Moore (born June 1, 1975) is an American former professional football player who was a guard in the National Football League (NFL). Moore was a two-year starter playing college football for the BYU Cougars, earning first-team All-WAC honors as a junior and senior. In 1997, he spent time with the Washington Redskins and the Seattle Seahawks. He played for the Indianapolis Colts before returning to the Redskins. He became Washington's starting center in 2002 in all 16 games, replacing Cory Raymer. In 2003, he started eight of 16 games. In 2004, he lost his starting job to the man he previously replaced, Cory Raymer. Moore was also the offensive line coach at the University of the Incarnate Word in San Antonio, Texas.

== Education ==
- High School – Monte Vista High School (Spring Valley, CA)
- Community College – Grossmont College (El Cajon, CA)
- University – Brigham Young University
