= Bradford Banta =

American football player (born 1970)

Personal information
- Born: December 14, 1970 (age 55); Baton Rouge, Louisiana, U.S.
- Listed height: 6 ft 6 in (1.98 m)
- Listed weight: 253 lb (115 kg)

Career information
- High school: LSU Lab (Baton Rouge, LA)
- College: USC (1989–1993)
- NFL draft: 1994: 4th round, 106th overall pick

Career history

Playing
- Indianapolis Colts (1994–1999); New York Jets (2000); Detroit Lions (2001–2003); Buffalo Bills (2004); San Francisco 49ers (2007)*
- * Offseason or practice squad member only

Coaching
- Chattanooga (2007) Tight ends coach; Detroit Lions (2008–2011) Assistant special teams coach; Detroit Lions (2012–2013) Assistant linebackers coach; Washington Redskins (2014–2016) Assistant special teams coach; New Orleans Saints (2017–2018) Special teams coordinator; Michigan (2019–2023) Special teams analyst

Awards and highlights
- CFP national champion (2023)

Career NFL statistics
- Games played: 156
- Games started: 2
- Fumble recoveries: 1
- Stats at Pro Football Reference

Bradford Banta (born December 14, 1970) is an American former professional football player and coach. He played tight end and long snapper in the National Football League (NFL) from 1994 to 2004. Banta also coached in the NFL from 2008 to 2018. He was an assistant coach for the Michigan Wolverines from 2019 to 2023, winning a national championship in his final season. Banta played college football for the USC Trojans.

== College career ==
At the University of Southern California, Banta was a two-year starter at tight end for Trojans (1989–93), as well as a four-time letter-winner. He earned honorable mention All-Pac-10 Conference honors as a junior and senior and received his bachelor's degree in communications with a minor in sociology in 1993.

== Professional career ==
Banta was selected in the fourth round of the 1994 NFL draft, 106 overall, by the Indianapolis Colts. He went on and played from 1994 to 2004 for the Indianapolis Colts, the New York Jets, the Detroit Lions, and the Buffalo Bills. He is noted for committing two unnecessary roughness penalties in a Monday Night Football matchup against the Miami Dolphins in 2000.

Banta served as a long snapper for a majority of his career, and played exclusively on special teams with the Lions. He had previously played tight end in offensive situations for the Colts.

After his playing days, Banta worked with as a supervisor for George Wright Construction for a year and in Chase's Home Financial Division for nearly two years in Chattanooga, Tennessee.

== Coaching career ==
=== University of Tennessee at Chattanooga ===
Banta coached the tight ends during the Chattanooga Mocs' 2007 season.

=== Detroit Lions ===
Banta was the assistant special teams coach for the Detroit Lions from 2008 to 2011, and then the assistant linebackers coach for the 2012 and 2013 seasons.

=== Washington Redskins ===
On February 4, 2014, it was announced that Banta would join the team as the Washington Redskins assistant special teams coach, serving under Ben Kotwica.

=== New Orleans Saints ===
On January 31, 2017, the New Orleans Saints hired Banta as their Special teams coordinator.

=== Michigan Wolverines ===
In February 2019, Banta was hired by Jim Harbaugh and the University of Michigan as a special teams analyst. He remained with the program until 2023, when they won a national championship.
