= 1996 Indianapolis Colts season =

44th season in franchise history

- Owner: Robert Irsay
- General manager: Bill Tobin
- Head coach: Lindy Infante
- Offensive coordinator: Lindy Infante
- Defensive coordinator: Jim Johnson
- Home stadium: RCA Dome

Results
- Record: 9–7
- Division place: 3rd AFC East
- Playoffs: Lost Wild Card Playoffs (at Steelers) 14–42

The 1996 Indianapolis Colts season was the 44th season for the team in the National Football League (NFL) and 13th in Indianapolis.

Despite leading the Colts to the AFC Championship Game the previous season, head coach Ted Marchibroda left the team after failing to come to terms with the club on a contract extension. The decision enraged many of the Colts, who loved playing for Marchibroda and blamed the front office for driving him away (Tony Siragusa often, and profanely, brought up his fury by stating "We had a great thing going, and this guy (GM Tobin) dismantled it"). Offensive coordinator Lindy Infante was promoted to head coach. Ironically, Marchibroda would quickly be hired to coach the newly relocated & then-unnamed NFL franchise in Baltimore that would eventually be named the Baltimore Ravens, thus returning to the city where he had previously coached the Colts when they were still based in Maryland.

On October 13 Indianapolis hosted the Ravens, thus not only pitting the Colts against the team based in their former home but also matching up Marchibroda against his former team. The Colts won 26–21. This game also has the distinction of being the first NFL on TNT broadcast after TNT's parent Turner Broadcasting System completed its merger with Time Warner only three days earlier.

The season saw the Colts draft Marvin Harrison. Harrison would go on to become a member of the Pro Football Hall of Fame, after spending his entire career as a Colt. Harrison was named to Pro Bowl several times and later helped the Colts win a Super Bowl in 2006. He continued to play for the team until 2008 and retired during the 2009 season.

The Indianapolis Colts finished the National Football League's 1996 season with a record of 9 wins and 7 losses, finished third in the AFC East division and reached the playoffs for the second consecutive season. Their Wild Card round game would be a rematch of the previous season's AFC title game, but would not be nearly as close as the Colts would be blown out 42–14 by the Pittsburgh Steelers.

== Offseason ==
=== NFL draft ===
1996 Indianapolis Colts draft
Round	Pick	Player	Position	College	Notes
1	19	Marvin Harrison ^{†}	Wide receiver	Syracuse	
2	51	Dedric Mathis	Defensive back	Houston	
3	82	Scott Slutzker	Tight end	Iowa	
Made roster † Pro Football Hall of Fame * Made at least one Pro Bowl during career

== Personnel ==
=== Staff ===
1996 Indianapolis Colts staff
Front office: President emeritus – Robert Irsay; Senior executive vice president/general manager/coo – Jim Irsay; Vice president/director of football operations – Bill Tobin; Assistant general manager – Bob Terpening; Director of pro player personnel – Clyde Powers; Director of college player personnel – George Boone; Head coaches: Head coach – Lindy Infante; Offensive coaches: Running backs – Gene Huey; Receivers – Jimmy Robinson; Tight ends/quality control – Tom Batta; Offensive line – Ron Blackledge; Assistant to the offensive line – Charlie Davis; Offensive assistant/assistant quarterbacks – Buddy Geis	Defensive coaches: Defensive coordinator – Jim Johnson; Defensive line – Greg Blache; Linebackers – Chuck Bresnahan; Secondary – Pat Thomas; Defensive assistant – Fred Bruney; Special teams coaches: Special teams – Hank Kuhlmann; Strength and conditioning: Strength and conditioning – Tom Zupancic

=== Roster ===
1996 Indianapolis Colts roster
Quarterbacks (QB): 12 Kerwin Bell; 4 Jim Harbaugh; 13 Kelly Holcomb; 11 Paul Justin; Running backs (RB): 28 Marshall Faulk; 33 Clif Groce FB; 44 Chris Hetherington FB; 20 Leon Neal; 21 Lamont Warren; 46 Vince Workman; Wide receivers (WR): 80 Aaron Bailey; 87 Sean Dawkins; 15 Chris Doering; 88 Marvin Harrison; 86 Brian Stablein PR; 10 Mark Stock; Tight ends (TE): 85 Ken Dilger; 81 Marcus Pollard; 84 Scott Slutzker	Offensive linemen (OL): 75 Troy Auzenne T; 65 Eric Mahlum G; 58 Jay Leeuwenburg C; 63 Kirk Lowdermilk C; 79 Tony Mandarich T; 67 Jason Mathews T; 71 Kipp Vickers T; 72 Derek West T; 64 Doug Widell G; Defensive linemen (DL): 56 Tony Bennett DE; 96 Richard Dent DE; 62 Ellis Johnson DE; 90 Steve Martin DT; 61 Tony McCoy DT; 97 Kendel Shello DT; 98 Tony Siragusa DT; 95 Bernard Whittington DE	Linebackers (LB): 51 Trev Alberts OLB; 50 Elijah Alexander OLB; 53 Sammie Burroughs OLB; 59 Steve Grant MLB; 54 Jeff Herrod MLB; 52 Steve Morrison OLB; Defensive backs (DB): 29 Jason Belser FS; 34 Ray Buchanan CB; 38 Eugene Daniel CB; 30 Derwin Gray SS; 35 Steve Hall FS; 39 Richard Jones CB; 26 Dedric Mathis CB; 40 Ray McElroy SS; Special teams (ST): 83 Bradford Banta LS; 14 Cary Blanchard K; 17 Chris Gardocki P	Practice squad: -- Shawn Banks LB; 66 Steve Hardin G; 27 Arnold Mickens RB; Reserve: 16 Avery Anderson WR (IR); 55 Quentin Coryatt LB (IR); 32 Zack Crockett FB (IR); 42 Roosevelt Potts RB (Susp.); 49 David Tate S (IR); 36 Damon Watts CB (IR); 94 David Wilkins DE (IR); 57 Phil Yeboah-Kodie LB (IR); Rookies in italics 53 active, 8 reserve, 3 practice squad

== Regular season ==
=== Schedule ===
Week	Date	Opponent	Result	Record	Venue	Attendance
1	September 1	Arizona Cardinals	**W** 20–13	1–0	RCA Dome	48,133
2	September 8	at **New York Jets**	**W** 21–7	2–0	The Meadowlands	63,534
3	September 15	at Dallas Cowboys	**W** 25–24	3–0	Texas Stadium	63,021
4	September 23	**Miami Dolphins**	**W** 10–6	4–0	RCA Dome	60,891
5	Bye					
6	October 6	at **Buffalo Bills**	**L** 13–16 (OT)	4–1	Rich Stadium	79,401
7	October 13	Baltimore Ravens	**W** 26–21	5–1	RCA Dome	56,978
8	October 20	**New England Patriots**	**L** 9–27	5–2	RCA Dome	58,725
9	October 27	at Washington Redskins	**L** 16–31	5–3	RFK Stadium	54,254
10	November 3	San Diego Chargers	**L** 19–26	5–4	RCA Dome	58,484
11	November 10	at **Miami Dolphins**	**L** 13–37	5–5	Joe Robbie Stadium	66,623
12	November 17	**New York Jets**	**W** 34–29	6–5	RCA Dome	48,322
13	November 24	at **New England Patriots**	**L** 13–27	6–6	Foxboro Stadium	58,226
14	December 1	**Buffalo Bills**	**W** 13–10 (OT)	7–6	RCA Dome	53,804
15	December 5	Philadelphia Eagles	**W** 37–10	8–6	RCA Dome	52,689
16	December 15	at Kansas City Chiefs	**W** 24–19	9–6	Arrowhead Stadium	71,136
17	December 22	at Cincinnati Bengals	**L** 24–31	9–7	Cinergy Field	49,389
Note: Intra-divisional opponents are in **bold** text.

=== Standings ===
AFC East
	W	L	T	PCT	PF	PA	STK
^{(2)} New England Patriots	11	5	0	.688	418	313	W1
^{(4)} Buffalo Bills	10	6	0	.625	319	266	W1
^{(6)} Indianapolis Colts	9	7	0	.563	317	334	L1
Miami Dolphins	8	8	0	.500	339	325	W2
New York Jets	1	15	0	.063	279	454	L7

== Playoffs ==
The team received a Wild Card playoff berth to the playoffs and traveled to Pittsburgh to play the Steelers. The Colts came back from a 13-point lead in the first half but the Steelers scored 29 unanswered points in the second half and went on to beat the Colts.

Round	Date	Opponent (seed)	Result	Record	Venue	Attendance
Wild Card	December 29	at Pittsburgh Steelers (3)	L 14–42	0–1	Three Rivers Stadium	58,078

== See also ==
- History of the Indianapolis Colts
- List of Indianapolis Colts seasons
- Colts–Patriots rivalry
