= 1995 Indianapolis Colts season =

43rd season in franchise history

- Owner: Robert Irsay
- General manager: Bill Tobin
- Head coach: Ted Marchibroda
- Offensive coordinator: Lindy Infante
- Defensive coordinator: Vince Tobin
- Home stadium: RCA Dome

Results
- Record: 9–7
- Division place: 2nd AFC East
- Playoffs: Won Wild Card Playoffs (at Chargers) 35–20; Won Divisional Playoffs (at Chiefs) 10–7; Lost AFC Championship (at Steelers) 16–20

The 1995 Indianapolis Colts season was the 43rd season for the team in the National Football League and 12th in Indianapolis. The Indianapolis Colts finished the National Football League's 1995 season with a record of 9 wins and 7 losses, and finished tied for second in the AFC East division with the Miami Dolphins. However, the Colts finished ahead of Miami based on head-to-head sweep (2–0).

The Colts' 9–7 record was good enough to get them into the playoffs for the first time since 1987, largely due to the insertion of Jim Harbaugh into the starting quarterback role. It was only the second playoff appearance for the franchise since it moved from Baltimore in 1984, and was its first playoff appearance in a non-strike year since 1977. They defeated the defending conference champion San Diego Chargers in their first playoff game (their first playoff win since 1971, when the team was still located in Baltimore), then upset the top-seeded Kansas City Chiefs in the Divisional Playoffs. The Colts would fall short in the AFC Championship Game against the Pittsburgh Steelers, in a game that came down to the final play.

== Offseason ==
=== Expansion draft ===
Indianapolis Colts selected during the expansion draft
Round	Overall	Name	Position	Expansion team
13	26	Dewell Brewer	Running Back	Carolina Panthers
27	54	Paul Butcher	Linebacker	Carolina Panthers

=== NFL draft ===
1995 Indianapolis Colts draft
Round	Pick	Player	Position	College	Notes
1	12	Ellis Johnson	Defensive tackle	Florida	
2	48	Ken Dilger *	Tight end	Illinois	
3	79	Zack Crockett	Fullback	Florida State	
4	114	Ray McElroy	Cornerback	Eastern Illinois	
5	149	Derek West	Tackle	Colorado	
6	187	Brian Gelzheiser	Linebacker	Penn State	
Made roster * Made at least one Pro Bowl during career

=== Undrafted free agents ===
1995 undrafted free agents of note
Player	Position	College
Ben Bronson	Wide receiver	Baylor
Conrad Clarks	Defensive back	Northeast Louisiana
Steve Morrison	Linebacker	Michigan
Marcus Pollard	Tight end	Bradley

=== Transactions ===
- July 29: The Indianapolis Colts signed wide receiver Wendell Davis

== Personnel ==
=== Staff ===
1995 Indianapolis Colts staff
Front office: President/treasurer – Robert Irsay; Vice president/general manager – Jim Irsay; Vice president/director of football operations – Bill Tobin; Assistant general manager – Bob Terpening; Director of pro player personnel – Clyde Powers; Director of college player personnel – George Boone; Head coaches: Head coach – Ted Marchibroda; Offensive coaches: Offensive coordinator – Lindy Infante; Running backs – Gene Huey; Receivers – Jimmy Robinson; Tight ends/quality control – Tom Batta; Offensive line – Ron Blackledge	Defensive coaches: Defensive coordinator – Vince Tobin; Defensive line – Greg Blache; Linebackers – Jim Johnson; Secondary – Pat Thomas; Defensive assistant – Fred Bruney; Special teams coaches: Special teams – Hank Kuhlmann; Strength and conditioning: Strength and conditioning – Tom Zupancic

=== Roster ===
1995 Indianapolis Colts roster
Quarterbacks (QB): 7 Craig Erickson; 4 Jim Harbaugh; 11 Paul Justin; Running backs (RB): 32 Zack Crockett FB; 28 Marshall Faulk; 27 Clif Groce; 25 Ronald Humphrey; 21 Lamont Warren; Wide receivers (WR): 80 Aaron Bailey; 10 Wendell Davis; 87 Sean Dawkins; 16 Bobby Olive; 86 Brian Stablein; 88 Floyd Turner; Tight ends (TE): 85 Ken Dilger; 81 Marcus Pollard	Offensive linemen (OL): 66 Seth Dittman T; 69 Randy Dixon G; 75 Shawn Harper T; 63 Kirk Lowdermilk C; 65 Eric Mahlum G; 74 Jason Mathews T; 79 Joe Staysniak G; 71 Kipp Vickers G; 72 Derek West T; 67 Will Wolford T; Defensive linemen (DL): 56 Tony Bennett DE; 62 Ellis Johnson DT; 61 Tony McCoy DT; 93 Freddie Joe Nunn DE; 99 Mike Pelton DT; 98 Tony Siragusa DT; 95 Bernard Whittington DE	Linebackers (LB): 51 Trev Alberts OLB; 57 Quentin Coryatt OLB; 59 Steve Grant OLB; 54 Jeff Herrod MLB; 55 Devon McDonald OLB; 92 Steve Morrison OLB; 97 Scott Radecic MLB; 96 Trevor Wilmot OLB; Defensive backs (DB): 33 Ashley Ambrose CB; 29 Jason Belser FS; 34 Ray Buchanan CB; 35 Conrad Clarks FS; 38 Eugene Daniel CB; 30 Derwin Gray SS; 40 Ray McElroy CB; 49 David Tate SS; 36 Damon Watts CB; Special teams (ST): 83 Bradford Banta LS; 14 Cary Blanchard K; 17 Chris Gardocki P	Practice squad: 64 Garin Patrick C; Reserve: 84 Flipper Anderson WR (IR); 94 Thomas McLemore TE (NF-Inj.); 42 Roosevelt Potts FB (IR); 46 Vince Workman RB (IR); Rookies in italics 53 active, 4 reserve, 1 practice squad

== Preseason ==
=== Schedule ===
Week	Date	Opponent	Result	Record	Venue	Attendance	Recap
1	August 4	Cincinnati Bengals	L 21–34	0–1	RCA Dome	39,946	
2	August 12	at Seattle Seahawks	W 20–17	1–1	Kingdome	38,006	
3	August 19	at Green Bay Packers	W 20–17 (OT)	2–1	Lambeau Field	55,624	
4	August 24	Chicago Bears	W 29–7	3–1	RCA Dome	45,626	

=== Game summaries ===
==== Week P1: vs. Cincinnati Bengals ====
Preseason Week 1: Cincinnati Bengals at Indianapolis Colts – Game summary

Quarter	1	2	3	4	Total
Bengals	7	10	10	7	34
Colts	3	8	0	10	21

at Hoosier Dome • Indianapolis, Indiana

- Date: August 4, 1995
- Game time: 7:30 p.m. EST
- Game attendance: 39,946
- TV: WTTV

==== Week P2: at Seattle Seahawks ====
Preseason Week 2: Indianapolis Colts at Seattle Seahawks – Game summary

Quarter	1	2	3	4	Total
Colts	3	0	7	10	20
Seahawks	0	0	3	14	17

at Kingdome • Seattle, Washington

- Date: August 12, 1995
- Game time: 9:00 p.m. EST
- Game attendance: 38,006
- TV: WTTV

==== Week P3: at Green Bay Packers ====
Preseason Week 3: Indianapolis Colts at Green Bay Packers – Game summary

Quarter	1	2	3	4	OT	Total
Colts	6	0	3	8	3	20
Packers	0	17	0	0	0	17

at Lambeau Field • Green Bay, Wisconsin

- Date: August 19, 1995
- Game time: 12 Noon EST
- Game attendance: 55,624
- TV: WTTV

== Regular season ==
=== Schedule ===
Week	Date	Opponent	Result	Record	Venue	Attendance	Recap
1	September 3	Cincinnati Bengals	**L** 21–24 (OT)	0–1	RCA Dome	42,445	Recap
2	September 10	at **New York Jets**	**W** 27–24 (OT)	1–1	Giants Stadium	65,134	Recap
3	September 17	at **Buffalo Bills**	**L** 14–20	1–2	Rich Stadium	62,499	Recap
4	Bye						
5	October 1	St. Louis Rams	**W** 21–18	2–2	RCA Dome	58,616	Recap
6	October 8	at **Miami Dolphins**	**W** 27–24 (OT)	3–2	Joe Robbie Stadium	68,471	Recap
7	October 15	San Francisco 49ers	**W** 18–17	4–2	RCA Dome	60,273	Recap
8	October 22	at Oakland Raiders	**L** 17–30	4–3	Oakland–Alameda County Coliseum	53,543	Recap
9	October 29	**New York Jets**	**W** 17–10	5–3	RCA Dome	49,250	Recap
10	November 5	**Buffalo Bills**	**L** 10–16	5–4	RCA Dome	59,612	Recap
11	November 12	at New Orleans Saints	**L** 14–17	5–5	Louisiana Superdome	44,122	Recap
12	November 19	at **New England Patriots**	**W** 24–10	6–5	Foxboro Stadium	59,544	Recap
13	November 26	**Miami Dolphins**	**W** 36–28	7–5	RCA Dome	60,414	Recap
14	December 3	at Carolina Panthers	**L** 10–13	7–6	Memorial Stadium	49,841	Recap
15	December 10	at Jacksonville Jaguars	**W** 41–31	8–6	Jacksonville Municipal Stadium	66,099	Recap
16	December 17	San Diego Chargers	**L** 24–27	8–7	RCA Dome	55,318	Recap
17	December 23	**New England Patriots**	**W** 10–7	9–7	RCA Dome	54,685	Recap
Note: Intra-division opponents are in **bold** text.

=== Game summaries ===
==== Week 1: vs. Cincinnati Bengals ====
Week 1: Cincinnati Bengals at Indianapolis Colts – Game summary

Quarter	1	2	3	4	OT	Total
Bengals (1–0)	3	10	8	0	3	**24**
Colts (0–1)	7	3	0	11	0	**21**

at RCA Dome, Indianapolis, Indiana

- Date: September 3, 1995
- Game time: 12 Noon EST
- Game attendance: 42,445
- Referee: Walt Coleman
- TV announcers (NBC): Tom Hammond (play-by-play), Bob Trumpy (color commentator) and Tunch Ilkin (sideline reporter)
- Pro-Football-Reference.com

==== Week 2 at Jets ====
Week Two: Indianapolis Colts (0–1) at New York Jets (0–1)

Quarter	1	2	3	4	OT	Total
**Colts**	0	3	7	14	3	**27**
Jets	14	3	7	0	0	**24**

at Giants Stadium, East Rutherford, New Jersey

- Date: September 10, 1995
- Game time: 3:05 p.m. EST
- Game weather: Sunny, 68 °F (20 °C)
- Game attendance: 65,134
- Referee: Larry Nemmers
- TV announcers (NBC): Tom Hammond and Bob Trumpy
- Box Score, Box Score

Game information

**First quarter**

- NYJ – Charles Wilson 5-yard pass from Boomer Esiason (Nick Lowery kick), 5:52. Jets 7–0. **Drive: 15 plays, 70 yards, 9:08.**
- NYJ – Otis Wilson 49-yard interception return (Nick Lowery kick), 3:51. Jets 14–0.

**Second quarter**

- NYJ – Nick Lowery 28-yard field goal, 11:41. Jets 17–0. **Drive: 8 plays, 64 yards.**
- IND – Mike Cofer 20-yard field goal, 0:27. Jets 17–3. **Drive: 11 plays, 73 yards.**

**Third quarter**

- NYJ – Wayne Chrebet 5-yard pass from Boomer Esiason (Nick Lowery kick), 13:14. Jets 24–3. **Drive: 4 plays, 24 yards.**
- IND – Tony Bennett 32-yard fumble return (Mike Cofer kick), 2:11. Jets 24–10.

**Fourth quarter**

- IND – Sean Dawkins 15-yard pass from Jim Harbaugh (Mike Cofer kick), 8:46. Jets 24–17. **Drive: 12 plays, 80 yards.**
- IND – Marshall Faulk 14-yard pass from Jim Harbaugh (Mike Cofer kick), 2:38. Tie 24–24. **Drive: 7 plays, 75 yards.**

**Overtime**

- IND – Mike Cofer 52-yard field goal, 10:33. Colts 27–24. **Drive: 7 plays, 48 yards.**

Top passers

- IND – Craig Erickson – 12/18, 141 yards, INT
- NYJ – Boomer Esiason – 19/30, 198 yards, 2 TD

Top rushers

- IND – Marshall Faulk – 21 rushes, 81 yards
- NYJ – Adrian Murrell – 11 rushes, 52 yards

Top receivers

- IND – Sean Dawkins – 5 receptions, 60 yards, TD
- NYJ – Adrian Murrell – 4 receptions, 68 yards

==== Week 3: at Buffalo Bills ====
Week 3: Indianapolis Colts at Buffalo Bills – Game summary

Quarter	1	2	3	4	Total
Colts (1–2)	7	7	0	0	**14**
Bills (2–1)	7	7	3	3	**20**

at Rich Stadium, Orchard Park, New York

- Date: September 17, 1995
- Game time: 12 Noon EST
- Game attendance: 62,499
- Referee: Bernie Kukar
- TV announcers (NBC): Tom Hammond (play-by-play) and Bob Trumpy (color commentator)
- Pro-Football-Reference.com

==== Week 5: vs. St. Louis Rams ====
Week 5: St. Louis Rams at Indianapolis Colts – Game summary

Quarter	1	2	3	4	Total
Rams (4–1)	7	3	0	8	**18**
Colts (2–2)	7	7	7	0	**21**

at RCA Dome, Indianapolis, Indiana

- Date: October 1, 1995
- Game time: 12 Noon EST
- Game attendance: 58,616
- Referee: Mike Carey
- TV announcers (FOX): Kevin Harlan (play-by-play) and Jerry Glanville (color commentator)
- Pro-Football-Reference.com

==== Week 6: at Miami Dolphins ====
Week 6: Indianapolis Colts at Miami Dolphins – Game summary

Quarter	1	2	3	4	OT	Total
Colts (3–2)	0	3	7	14	3	**27**
Dolphins (4–1)	14	10	0	0	0	**24**

at Joe Robbie Stadium, Miami Gardens, Florida

- Date: October 8, 1995
- Game time: 3:01 p.m. EST
- Game attendance: 68,471
- Referee: Tom White
- TV announcers (NBC): Dick Enberg (play-by-play), Paul Maguire (color commentator), Phil Simms (color commentator) and Jim Gray (sideline reporter)
- Pro-Football-Reference.com

==== Week 7: vs. San Francisco 49ers ====
Week 7: San Francisco 49ers at Indianapolis Colts – Game summary

Quarter	1	2	3	4	Total
49ers (4–2)	0	7	7	3	**17**
Colts (4–2)	3	3	9	3	**18**

at RCA Dome, Indianapolis, Indiana

- Date: October 15, 1995
- Game time: 12 Noon EST
- Game attendance: 60,273
- Referee: Gary Lane
- TV announcers (FOX): Dick Stockton (play-by-play) and Matt Millen (color commentator)
- Pro-Football-Reference.com

==== Week 8: at Oakland Raiders ====
Week 8: Indianapolis Colts at Oakland Raiders – Game summary

Quarter	1	2	3	4	Total
Colts (4–3)	3	7	7	0	**17**
Raiders (6–2)	7	3	17	3	**30**

at Oakland–Alameda County Coliseum, Oakland, California

- Date: October 22, 1995
- Game time: 3:05 p.m. EST
- Game attendance: 53,543
- Referee: Gerry Austin
- TV announcers (NBC): Don Criqui (play-by-play) and Beasley Reece (color commentator)
- Pro-Football-Reference.com

==== Week 9: vs. New York Jets ====
Week 9: New York Jets at Indianapolis Colts – Game summary

Quarter	1	2	3	4	Total
Jets (2–7)	3	0	0	7	**10**
Colts (5–3)	3	14	0	0	**17**

at RCA Dome, Indianapolis, Indiana

- Date: October 29, 1995
- Game time: 1:00 p.m. EST
- Game attendance: 49,250
- Referee: Jerry Markbreit
- TV announcers (NBC): Marv Albert (play-by-play) and Cris Collinsworth (color commentator)
- Pro-Football-Reference.com

==== Week 10: at Buffalo Bills ====
Week 10: Buffalo Bills at Indianapolis Colts – Game summary

Quarter	1	2	3	4	Total
Bills (6–3)	10	6	0	0	**16**
Colts (5–4)	7	0	3	0	**10**

at RCA Dome, Indianapolis, Indiana

- Date: November 5, 1995
- Game time: 4:05 p.m. EST
- Game attendance: 59,612
- Referee: Larry Nemmers
- TV announcers (NBC): Dan Hicks (play-by-play) and Cris Collinsworth (color commentator)
- Pro-Football-Reference.com

==== Week 11: at New Orleans Saints ====
Week 11: Indianapolis Colts at New Orleans Saints – Game summary

Quarter	1	2	3	4	Total
Colts (5–5)	0	7	0	7	**14**
Saints (4–6)	0	7	7	3	**17**

at Louisiana Superdome, New Orleans, Louisiana

- Date: November 12, 1995
- Game attendance: 44,122
- Referee: Dick Hantak
- TV announcers (NBC): Tom Hammond (play-by-play) and Bob Trumpy (color commentator)
- Pro-Football-Reference.com

==== Week 12: at New England Patriots ====
Week 11: Indianapolis Colts at New England Patriots – Game summary

Quarter	1	2	3	4	Total
Colts (6–5)	0	17	0	7	**24**
Patriots (4–7)	3	0	7	0	**10**

at Foxboro Stadium, Foxborough, Massachusetts

- Date: November 19, 1995
- Game attendance: 59,544
- Referee: Ron Blum
- TV announcers (NBC): Don Criqui (play-by-play) and Beasley Reece (color commentator)
- Pro-Football-Reference.com

==== Week 13: vs. Miami Dolphins ====
Week 13: Miami Dolphins at Indianapolis Colts – Game summary

Quarter	1	2	3	4	Total
Dolphins (6–6)	0	6	8	14	**28**
Colts (7–5)	14	10	2	10	**36**

at RCA Dome, Indianapolis, Indiana

- Date: November 26, 1995
- Game time: 1:01 p.m. EST
- Game attendance: 60,414
- Referee: Bob McElwee
- TV announcers (NBC): Jim Lampley (play-by-play) and Bob Trumpy (color commentator)
- Pro-Football-Reference.com

==== Week 14: at Carolina Panthers ====
Week 14: Indianapolis Colts at Carolina Panthers – Game summary

Quarter	1	2	3	4	Total
Colts (7–6)	10	0	0	0	**10**
Panthers (6–7)	0	10	0	3	**13**

at Memorial Stadium, Clemson, South Carolina

- Date: December 3, 1995
- Game attendance: 49,841
- Referee: Ed Hochuli
- TV announcers (NBC): Jim Lampley (play-by-play) and Bob Golic (color commentator)
- Pro-Football-Reference.com

==== Week 15: at Jacksonville Jaguars ====
Week 15: Indianapolis Colts at Jacksonville Jaguars – Game summary

Quarter	1	2	3	4	Total
**Colts**	14	10	3	14	**41**
Jaguars	0	7	3	21	**31**

at Jacksonville Municipal Stadium, Jacksonville, Florida

- Date: December 10, 1995
- Game time: 1:00 pm EST/2:00 pm CST
- Game weather: 49°, relative humidity 56%, wind 17 mph
- Game attendance: 66,099
- Referee: Mike Carey
- TV announcers (NBC): Jim Donovan, and John Dockery

On the opening kickoff, Colts return specialist Aaron Bailey, found a gap and sprinted 95 yards for a touchdown. The Jaguars countered by moving the ball to the Colts' 9–yard line; however, Mike Hollis' 27–yard field goal attempt was blocked. In response, the Colts scored another touchdown, with Bailey catching a 14–yard pass. A 45–yard completion to wide receiver Willie Jackson contributed to a Jaguars touchdown, cutting the Colts lead to 7 early in the second quarter. After a Colts punt, Cedric Tillman fumbled the ball during the return, with the Colts' Derwin Gray recovering the ball, which set up another Colts touchdown. On the following drive, Jaguars' quarterback Mark Brunell was intercepted by cornerback Eugene Daniel, who returned it to Jacksonville's 3–yard line. Nevertheless, the Colts were unable to score a touchdown and opted for a field goal, concluding the first half with the Colts leading 24–7. The Jaguars commenced the second half with a successful field goal drive, which the Colts promptly matched with a field goal of their own. As the fourth quarter began, the Jaguars executed a touchdown drive, reducing the Colts lead to 10. They attempted an onside kick, but the Colts recovered, leading to a subsequent touchdown for the Colts. In response, the Jaguars quickly scored a touchdown in just four plays, highlighted by a 31–yard pass to Jackson. The Jaguars attempted another onside kick, but the Colts recovered once more and added another touchdown to their tally. In the closing minutes, the Jaguars mounted a drive where Brunell connected with Jackson for another touchdown. They made a third attempt at an onside kick, but the Colts again recovered, ultimately securing a 41–31 victory in their inaugural matchup.

==== Week 16: vs. San Diego Chargers ====
Week 16: San Diego Chargers at Indianapolis Colts – Game summary

Quarter	1	2	3	4	Total
Chargers (8–7)	7	0	7	13	**27**
Colts (8–7)	3	7	0	14	**24**

at RCA Dome, Indianapolis, Indiana

- Date: December 17, 1995
- Game time: 4:05 p.m. EST
- Game attendance: 55,318
- Referee: Gary Lane
- TV announcers (NBC): Don Criqui (play-by-play) and Beasley Reece (color commentator)
- Pro-Football-Reference.com

==== Week 17: vs. New England Patriots ====
Week 17: New England Patriots at Indianapolis Colts – Game summary

Quarter	1	2	3	4	Total
Patriots (6–10)	0	7	0	0	**7**
Colts (9–7)	0	0	7	3	**10**

at RCA Dome, Indianapolis, Indiana

- Date: December 23, 1995
- Game time: 8:01 p.m. EST
- Game attendance: 54,685
- Referee: Howard Roe
- TV announcers (ESPN): Mike Patrick (play-by-play), Joe Theismann (color commentator) and Mark Malone (sideline reporter)
- Pro-Football-Reference.com

=== Standings ===
AFC East
	W	L	T	PCT	PF	PA	STK
^{(3)} Buffalo Bills	10	6	0	.625	350	335	L1
^{(5)} Indianapolis Colts	9	7	0	.563	331	316	W1
^{(6)} Miami Dolphins	9	7	0	.563	398	332	W1
New England Patriots	6	10	0	.375	294	377	L2
New York Jets	3	13	0	.188	233	384	L4

== Playoffs ==
The team received a Wild-Card playoff berth for the playoffs and traveled to San Diego to play the Chargers. They went on to beat the Chargers, their first playoff win in 24 years and first since moving to Indianapolis. They also won their Divisional Round game against the #1 seed Kansas City Chiefs but would fall short in the AFC Championship game to the Pittsburgh Steelers.

=== Schedule ===
Round	Date	Opponent (seed)	Result	Record	Venue	Attendance	Recap
Wild Card	December 31	at San Diego Chargers (4)	W 35–20	1–0	Jack Murphy Stadium	61,182	Recap
Divisional	January 7, 1996	at Kansas City Chiefs (1)	W 10–7	2–0	Arrowhead Stadium	77,594	Recap
Conference Championship	January 14, 1996	at Pittsburgh Steelers (2)	L 16–20	2–1	Three Rivers Stadium	61,062	Recap

=== Game summaries ===
==== AFC Wild Card Playoffs: at (4) San Diego Chargers ====
AFC Wild Card Playoffs: Indianapolis Colts at San Diego Chargers – Game summary

Quarter	1	2	3	4	Total
Colts	0	14	7	14	35
Chargers	3	7	7	3	20

at Jack Murphy Stadium, San Diego, California

- Date: December 31, 1995
- Game time: 4:00 p.m. EST
- Game attendance: 61,182
- Referee: Gary Lane
- TV announcers (NBC): Dick Enberg (play-by-play), Paul Maguire (color commentator), Phil Simms (color commentator) and Jim Gray (sideline reporter)
- Pro-Football-Reference.com

Scoring summary

Quarter	Time	Drive			Team	Scoring information	Score	
Quarter	Time	Plays	Yards	TOP	Team	Scoring information	IND	SD
1	9:28	9	30	3:25	Chargers	54-yard field goal by Carney	0	3
2	14:03	8	27	3:45	Colts	Dilger 2-yard touchdown reception from Harbaugh, Blanchard kick good	7	3
2	5:48	18	68	8:15	Chargers	Pupunu 6-yard touchdown reception from Humphries, Carney kick good	7	10
2	1:27	8	80	4:01	Colts	Crockett 33-yard touchdown run, Blanchard kick good	14	10
3	10:40	7	81	3:39	Chargers	Jefferson 11-yard touchdown reception from Humphries, Carney kick good	14	17
3	0:41	7	81	3:39	Colts	Dawkins 42-yard touchdown reception from Harbaugh, Blanchard kick good	21	17
4	11:53	8	55	3:48	Chargers	30-yard field goal by Carney	21	20
4	11:28	1	66	0:25	Colts	Crockett 66-yard touchdown run, Blanchard kick good	28	20
4	6:55	6	23	3:31	Colts	Harbaugh 3-yard touchdown run, Blanchard kick good	35	20
"TOP" = time of possession. For other American football terms, see Glossary of American football.							35	20

==== AFC Divisional Playoffs: at (1) Kansas City Chiefs ====
AFC Divisional Playoffs: Indianapolis Colts at Kansas City Chiefs – Game summary

Quarter	1	2	3	4	Total
Colts	0	7	3	0	10
Chiefs	7	0	0	0	7

at Arrowhead Stadium, Kansas City, Missouri

- Date: January 7, 1996
- Game time: 4:00 p.m. EST
- Game attendance: 77,594
- Referee: Jerry Markbreit
- TV announcers (NBC): Dick Enberg (play-by-play), Paul Maguire (color commentator), Phil Simms (color commentator) and Jim Gray (sideline reporter)
- Pro-Football-Reference.com

Scoring summary

Quarter	Time	Drive			Team	Scoring information	Score	
Quarter	Time	Plays	Yards	TOP	Team	Scoring information	IND	KC
1	0:29	5	62	2:28	Chiefs	Dawson 6-yard touchdown reception from Bono, Elliott kick good	0	7
2	5:49	18	77	8:40	Colts	Turner 5-yard touchdown reception from Harbaugh, Blanchard kick good	7	7
3	2:48	9	35	4:34	Colts	30-yard field goal by Blanchard	10	7
"TOP" = time of possession. For other American football terms, see Glossary of American football.							10	7

==== AFC Championship Game: at (2) Pittsburgh Steelers ====
AFC Championship Game: Indianapolis Colts at Pittsburgh Steelers – Game summary

Quarter	1	2	3	4	Total
Colts	3	3	3	7	16
Steelers	3	7	3	7	20

at Three Rivers Stadium, Pittsburgh, Pennsylvania

- Date: January 14, 1996
- Game time: 12:30 p.m. EST
- Game attendance: 61,062
- Referee: Bernie Kukar
- TV announcers (NBC): Dick Enberg (play-by-play), Paul Maguire (color commentator), Phil Simms (color commentator), Jim Gray (sideline reporter) and Will McDonough (sideline reporter)
- Pro-Football-Reference.com

Scoring summary

Quarter	Time	Drive			Team	Scoring information	Score	
Quarter	Time	Plays	Yards	TOP	Team	Scoring information	IND	PIT
1	12:17	4	7	1:58	Colts	34-yard field goal by Blanchard	3	0
1	1:50	11	40	5:53	Steelers	31-yard field goal by Johnson	3	3
2	12:08	10	61	4:42	Colts	36-yard field goal by Blanchard	6	3
2	0:13	17	80	7:27	Steelers	Stewart 5-yard touchdown reception from O'Donnell, Johnson kick good	6	10
3	9:57	10	61	5:03	Colts	37-yard field goal by Blanchard	9	10
3	0:43	7	44	3:17	Steelers	36-yard field goal by Johnson	9	13
4	8:46	4	70	2:11	Colts	Turner 47-yard touchdown reception from Harbaugh, Blanchard kick good	16	13
4	1:34	8	67	1:29	Steelers	Morris 1-yard touchdown run, Johnson kick good	16	20
"TOP" = time of possession. For other American football terms, see Glossary of American football.							16	20

== Awards and records ==
- Jim Harbaugh, NFL Passing Leader, (Passer Rating 100.7)
- Jim Harbaugh, NFL Comeback Player of the Year

== See also ==
- History of the Indianapolis Colts
- Indianapolis Colts seasons
- Colts–Patriots rivalry
- 1995 AFC Championship game
