= 1997 Indianapolis Colts season =

45th season in franchise history

- Owner: Jim Irsay
- General manager: N/A
- Head coach: Lindy Infante
- Offensive coordinator: Lindy Infante
- Defensive coordinator: Jim Johnson
- Home stadium: RCA Dome

Results
- Record: 3–13
- Division place: 5th AFC East
- Playoffs: Did not qualify

The 1997 Indianapolis Colts season was the 45th season for the team in the National Football League and 14th in Indianapolis. The Colts finished the National Football League’s 1997 season with a record of 3 wins and 13 losses, and finished fifth in the AFC East division. The Colts would start horribly, losing their first ten games for their worst start since 1986. They became only the second team to start 0–10 since 1987 after the 1993 Bengals, before an upset home win over eventual NFC Champion Green Bay. That would turn out to be the only good highlight all season for the Colts, as the team fell to a league-worst 3–13 record, and earned the first overall pick in the 1998 NFL draft, where they selected quarterback Peyton Manning.

== Offseason ==
=== NFL draft ===
1997 Indianapolis Colts draft
Round	Pick	Player	Position	College	Notes
1	19	Tarik Glenn *	Offensive tackle	California	
2	48	Adam Meadows	Offensive tackle	Georgia	
3	86	Bertrand Berry *	Defensive end	Notre Dame	
Made roster * Made at least one Pro Bowl during career

== Personnel ==
=== Staff ===
1997 Indianapolis Colts staff
Front office: President emeritus – Robert Irsay; Senior executive vice president/general manager/coo – Jim Irsay; Vice president/director of football operations – Bill Tobin; Assistant general manager – Bob Terpening; Director of pro player personnel – Clyde Powers; Director of college player personnel – George Boone; Head coaches: Head coach – Lindy Infante; Offensive coaches: Running backs – Gene Huey; Receivers – Jimmy Robinson; Tight ends/quality control – Tom Batta; Offensive line – Ron Blackledge; Assistant to the offensive line – Charlie Davis; Offensive assistant/assistant quarterbacks – Buddy Geis	Defensive coaches: Defensive coordinator – Jim Johnson; Defensive line – Greg Blache; Linebackers – Chuck Bresnahan; Secondary – Pat Thomas; Defensive assistant – Fred Bruney; Special teams coaches: Special teams – Hank Kuhlmann; Strength and conditioning: Strength and conditioning – Tom Zupancic

=== Roster ===
1997 Indianapolis Colts roster
Quarterbacks (QB): 12 Kerwin Bell; 4 Jim Harbaugh; 13 Kelly Holcomb; Running backs (RB): 32 Zack Crockett FB; 28 Marshall Faulk; 33 Clif Groce FB; 44 Chris Hetherington FB; 20 Leon Neal; 21 Lamont Warren; Wide receivers (WR): 80 Aaron Bailey KR; 87 Sean Dawkins; 15 Chris Doering; 88 Marvin Harrison; 18 Nate Jacquet PR; 86 Brian Stablein PR; Tight ends (TE): 85 Ken Dilger; 81 Marcus Pollard	Offensive linemen (OL): 66 Eugene Chung G; 78 Tarik Glenn G; 58 Jay Leeuwenburg C; 79 Tony Mandarich T; 67 Jason Mathews G; 73 Adam Meadows T; 71 Kipp Vickers T; 72 Derek West T; 64 Doug Widell G; Defensive linemen (DL): 99 Albert Fontenot DE; 98 Dan Footman DE; 62 Ellis Johnson DT; 90 Steve Martin DT; 61 Tony McCoy DT; 92 Carl Powell DE; 97 Kendel Shello DT; 95 Bernard Whittington DT	Linebackers (LB): 50 Elijah Alexander OLB; 57 Bertrand Berry OLB; 53 Sammie Burroughs OLB; 55 Quentin Coryatt OLB; 59 Steve Grant MLB; 52 Steve Morrison OLB; 51 Scott Von der Ahe MLB; Defensive backs (DB): 29 Jason Belser FS; 25 Robert Blackmon SS; 27 Rico Clark CB; 26 Carlton Gray CB; 30 Derwin Gray FS; 39 Emmanuel McDaniel CB; 40 Ray McElroy CB; 34 Monty Montgomery CB; 49 David Tate SS; Special teams (ST): 83 Bradford Banta LS; 14 Cary Blanchard K; 17 Chris Gardocki P	Practice squad: 60 Jason Johnson C; -- Anthone Lott CB; 10 Kaipo McGuire WR; Reserve: 56 Tony Bennett DE (IR); 11 Paul Justin QB (IR); 65 Eric Mahlum G (PUP); 23 Dedric Mathis CB (IR); 84 Scott Slutzker TE (IR); 36 Damon Watts CB (IR); 69 Clay Williams T (IR); 37 Abu Wilson RB (IR); Rookies in italics 53 active, 8 reserve, 3 practice squad

== Regular season ==
=== Schedule ===
Week	Date	Opponent	Result	Record	Game Site	Attendance
1	August 31	at **Miami Dolphins**	**L** 10–16	0–1	Pro Player Stadium	70,813
2	September 7	**New England Patriots**	**L** 6–31	0–2	RCA Dome	53,632
3	September 14	Seattle Seahawks	**L** 3–31	0–3	RCA Dome	49,194
4	September 21	at **Buffalo Bills**	**L** 35–37	0–4	Rich Stadium	55,340
5	Bye					
6	October 5	**New York Jets**	**L** 12–16	0–5	RCA Dome	48,295
7	October 12	at Pittsburgh Steelers	**L** 22–24	0–6	Three Rivers Stadium	57,925
8	October 20	**Buffalo Bills**	**L** 6–9	0–7	RCA Dome	61,139
9	October 26	at San Diego Chargers	**L** 19–35	0–8	Jack Murphy Stadium	63,177
10	November 2	Tampa Bay Buccaneers	**L** 28–31	0–9	RCA Dome	58,512
11	November 9	Cincinnati Bengals	**L** 13–28	0–10	RCA Dome	58,473
12	November 16	Green Bay Packers	**W** 41–38	1–10	RCA Dome	60,928
13	November 23	at Detroit Lions	**L** 10–32	1–11	Pontiac Silverdome	62,803
14	November 30	at **New England Patriots**	**L** 17–20	1–12	Foxboro Stadium	58,507
15	December 7	at **New York Jets**	**W** 22–14	2–12	The Meadowlands	61,168
16	December 14	**Miami Dolphins**	**W** 41–0	3–12	RCA Dome	61,282
17	December 21	at Minnesota Vikings	**L** 28–39	3–13	Metrodome	54,107
Note: Intra-divisional opponents are in **bold** text.

=== Game summaries ===
==== Week 9 (Sunday, October 26, 1997): at San Diego Chargers ====
Although unknown at the time, this game was of significant consequence in NFL history. The loser of this game would have the first pick in the 1998 NFL draft, which for the Colts was Peyton Manning.

== Standings ==
AFC East
	W	L	T	PCT	PF	PA	STK
^{(3)} New England Patriots	10	6	0	.625	369	289	W1
^{(6)} Miami Dolphins	9	7	0	.563	339	327	L2
New York Jets	9	7	0	.563	348	287	L1
Buffalo Bills	6	10	0	.375	255	367	L3
Indianapolis Colts	3	13	0	.188	313	401	L1

== See also ==
- History of the Indianapolis Colts
- Indianapolis Colts seasons
- Colts–Patriots rivalry
