= 1995–96 NFL playoffs =

American football tournament

- Dates: December 30, 1995–January 28, 1996
- Season: 1995
- Teams: 12
- Games played: 11
- Super Bowl XXX site: Sun Devil Stadium; Tempe, Arizona
- Defending champions: San Francisco 49ers
- Champion: Dallas Cowboys (5th title)
- Runner-up: Pittsburgh Steelers
- Conference runners-up: Green Bay Packers; Indianapolis Colts
NFL playoffs
← 1994–95	1996–97 →

The National Football League playoffs for the 1995 season began on December 30, 1995. The postseason tournament concluded with the Dallas Cowboys defeating the Pittsburgh Steelers in Super Bowl XXX, 27–17, on January 28, 1996, at Sun Devil Stadium in Tempe, Arizona.

== Participants ==
Within each conference, the three division winners and the three non-division winners with the best overall regular season records qualified for the playoffs. The three division winners were seeded 1–3 based on the overall won-lost-tied record, and the three wild card teams were seeded 4–6. The NFL did not use a fixed bracket playoff system, and there were no restrictions regarding teams from the same division matching up in any round. In the first round, dubbed the wild-card playoffs or wild-card weekend, the third-seeded division winner hosted the sixth seed wild card, and the fourth seed hosted the fifth. The 1 and 2 seeds from each conference received a first-round bye. In the second round, the divisional playoffs, the number 1 seed hosted the worst-remaining seed from the first round (seed 4, 5, or 6), while the number 2 seed played the other team (seed 3, 4, or 5). The two winning teams from each conference's divisional playoff games then meet in the respective AFC and NFC Conference Championship games, hosted by the higher seed. Although the Super Bowl, the championship round of the playoffs, was played at a neutral site, the designated home team was based on an annual rotation by conference.

Playoff seeds
Seed	AFC	NFC
1	Kansas City Chiefs (West winner)	Dallas Cowboys (East winner)
2	Pittsburgh Steelers (Central winner)	San Francisco 49ers (West winner)
3	Buffalo Bills (East winner)	Green Bay Packers (Central winner)
4	San Diego Chargers (wild card)	Philadelphia Eagles (wild card)
5	Indianapolis Colts (wild card)	Detroit Lions (wild card)
6	Miami Dolphins (wild card)	Atlanta Falcons (wild card)

== Bracket ==
Dec 31 – Lambeau Field	Jan 6 – 3Com Park
6	Atlanta	20
3	Green Bay	27
3	Green Bay	37	Jan 14 – Texas Stadium
2	San Francisco	17
NFC
Dec 30 – Veterans Stadium	3	Green Bay	27
Jan 7 – Texas Stadium
1	Dallas	38
5	Detroit	37	NFC Championship
4	Philadelphia	11
4	Philadelphia	58	Jan 28 – Sun Devil Stadium
1	Dallas	30
Wild-card round
Divisional round
Dec 31 – Jack Murphy Stadium	N1	Dallas	27
Jan 7 – Arrowhead Stadium
A2	Pittsburgh	17
5	Indianapolis	35	Super Bowl XXX
5	Indianapolis	10
4	San Diego	20	Jan 14 – Three Rivers Stadium
1	Kansas City	7
AFC
Dec 30 – Rich Stadium	5	Indianapolis	16
Jan 6 – Three Rivers Stadium
2	Pittsburgh	20
6	Miami	22	AFC Championship
3	Buffalo	21
3	Buffalo	37
2	Pittsburgh	40

== Schedule ==
In the United States, ABC broadcast the first two Wild Card playoff games. Fox then televised the rest of the NFC games. NBC broadcast the rest of the AFC playoff games and Super Bowl XXX.

Round	Away team	Score	Home team	Date	Kickoff (ET / UTC−5)	TV
Wild-card round	Miami Dolphins	22–37	Buffalo Bills	December 30, 1995	12:30 p.m.	ABC
Wild-card round	Detroit Lions	37–58	Philadelphia Eagles	December 30, 1995	4:00 p.m.	ABC
Wild-card round	Atlanta Falcons	20–37	Green Bay Packers	December 31, 1995	12:30 p.m.	Fox
Wild-card round	Indianapolis Colts	35–20	San Diego Chargers	December 31, 1995	4:00 p.m.	NBC
Divisional round	Buffalo Bills	21–40	Pittsburgh Steelers	January 6, 1996	12:30 p.m.	NBC
Divisional round	Green Bay Packers	27–17	San Francisco 49ers	January 6, 1996	4:00 p.m.	Fox
Divisional round	Philadelphia Eagles	11–30	Dallas Cowboys	January 7, 1996	12:30 p.m.	Fox
Divisional round	Indianapolis Colts	10–7	Kansas City Chiefs	January 7, 1996	4:00 p.m.	NBC
Conference championships	Indianapolis Colts	16–20	Pittsburgh Steelers	January 14, 1996	12:30 p.m.	NBC
Conference championships	Green Bay Packers	27–38	Dallas Cowboys	January 14, 1996	4:00 p.m.	Fox
Super Bowl XXX Sun Devil Stadium Tempe, Arizona	Dallas Cowboys	27–17	Pittsburgh Steelers	January 28, 1996	6:15 p.m.	NBC

== Wild-card round ==
=== Saturday, December 30, 1995 ===
==== AFC: Buffalo Bills 37, Miami Dolphins 22 ====
Miami Dolphins vs. Buffalo Bills – Game summary

Quarter	1	2	3	4	Total
Dolphins	0	0	0	22	22
Bills	10	14	3	10	37

at Rich Stadium, Orchard Park, New York

- Game time: 12:30 p.m. EST
- Game weather: 30 °F (−1 °C), cloudy
- Game attendance: 73,103
- Referee: Red Cashion
- TV announcers (ABC): Brent Musburger and Dick Vermeil

Game information

First quarter

- BUF – Thurman Thomas 1-yard run (Steve Christie kick). Bills 7–0.
- BUF – Steve Christie 48-yard field goal. Bills 10–0.

Second quarter

- BUF – Darick Holmes 21-yard run (Steve Christie kick). Bills 17–0.
- BUF – Steve Tasker 37-yard pass from Jim Kelly (Steve Christie kick). Bills 24–0.

Third quarter

- BUF – Steve Christie 23-yard field goal. Bills 27–0.

Fourth quarter

- MIA – O. J. McDuffie 5-yard pass from Dan Marino (Pete Stoyanovich kick). Bills 27–7.
- BUF – Tim Tindale 44-yard run (Steve Christie kick). Bills 34–7.
- MIA – Randal Hill 45-yard pass from Dan Marino (Pete Stoyanovich kick). Bills 34–14.
- BUF – Steve Christie 42-yard field goal. Bills 37–14.
- MIA – Terry Kirby 1-yard run (O.J. McDuffie pass from Dan Marino). Bills 37–22.

Top passers

- MIA – Dan Marino – 33/64, 422 yards, 2 TD, 3 INT
- BUF – Jim Kelly – 12/22, 195 yards, 1 TD, 2 INT

Top rushers

- MIA – Keith Byars – 4 rushes, 22 yards
- BUF – Thurman Thomas – 25 rushes, 158 yards, 1 TD

Top receivers

- MIA – O. J. McDuffie – 11 receptions, 154 yards, 1 TD
- BUF – Steve Tasker – 5 receptions, 108 yards, 1 TD

Although Dolphins quarterback Dan Marino completed 33 out of 64 passes for 422 yards, the Bills jumped to a 27–0 lead going into the fourth quarter, forced four turnovers, and rushed 341 yards, the second highest amount in NFL postseason history and the most since Chicago gained 382 rushing yards in the 1940 NFL championship game.

Buffalo started the scoring with a 58-yard drive, 45 yards which came from 3 receptions by Steve Tasker (who normally only played on special teams). Thurman Thomas finished off the possession with a 1-yard touchdown run to give the Bills a 7–0 early lead. Miami had to punt on their next drive, and John Kidd's kick went just 29 to the Bills 44-yard line. Three carries by Thomas for 26 yards on the following drive set up Steve Christie's 48-yard field goal. At the end of Miami's next possession, Kidd's 48-yard punt pinned Buffalo back at their own 1-yard line. Buffalo then drove 98 yards, with receiver Bill Brooks picking up 21 yards on an end-around run and Kelly completing a 26-yard pass to Tasker. Darick Holmes' 34-yard run then moved the ball to the Dolphins 1, but that was as far as the drive would go, as Gene Atkins intercepted Kelly's pass in the end zone on the first play of the second quarter.

Still, Miami was unable to build any momentum. They managed to drive into Buffalo territory, only to turn the ball over on downs at the Bills 32. Then Thomas went back to work, breaking off a 13-yard run on the next play, and later taking off for a 32-yard gain to the Dolphins 21-yard line. On the next play, Buffalo scored on Holmes' 21-yard touchdown run, increasing their lead to 17–0. Then on the Dolphins' next drive, Dan Marino threw a pass that was deflected by Phil Hansen and picked off by linebacker Marlo Perry, giving Buffalo the ball on their 38-yard line. Following an 18-yard run and 7-yard reception by Thomas, Kelly capitalized on the turnover with a 37-yard touchdown throw to Tasker, increasing the Bills lead to 24–0. The next three drives would end poorly for both teams. First Miami turned the ball over on downs again when linebacker Cornelius Bennett tackled Terry Kirby one yard short of a first down on 4th and 10 from the Bills 40-yard line. Then Buffalo gave the ball right back when Kelly threw a pass that was intercepted by Troy Vincent. Miami went on to drive 61 yards, including Marino's 31-yard completion to wide receiver Gary Clark, to the Bills 35-yard line, but their drive ended there and Pete Stoyanovich missed a 53-yard field goal attempt on the last play of the half.

The situation didn't get better for Miami in the third quarter. On their first drive Marino was intercepted by defensive back Fimel Johnson. Then on their next possession, Marino fumbled a snap out of shotgun formation, and Bills defensive end Bryce Paup recovered it, resulting in Christie's second field goal that gave the Bills a 27–0 lead. The Dolphins responded by driving 67 yards, including Marino's 31-yard completion to O. J. McDuffie, to cut the score to 27–7 with McDuffie's 5-yard touchdown catch early in the fourth quarter. But after a Bills punt, the Dolphins turned the ball over on downs at the Bills 39. Following two carries by Thomas for 17 yards, fullback Tim Tindale, a rookie from Canada's Western Ontario University who had never gained more than 6 yards in a single carry before this game, took off for a 44-yard touchdown run, giving the Bills a 34–7 lead.

The game was essentially over by now, but there was plenty more scoring. Miami stormed back, driving 68 yards in 7 plays to score on Marino's 45-yard bomb to Randal Hill. Buffalo responded with 3 carries by Tindale for 23 yards to set up Christie's 42-yard field goal. Miami then moved the ball 73 yards in 9 plays. The key player on the drive was running back Terry Kirby, who caught 3 passes for 46 yards and finished it off with a 1-yard touchdown run, making the final score of the game 37–22. The Dolphins managed to recover an onside kick, but lost the ball when Marino was intercepted by rookie Ken Irvin.

Both teams combined for a playoff record 1,038 total yards (502 for Miami, 536 for Buffalo). Thomas rushed for 158 yards, caught 3 passes for 48 yards, and scored a touchdown. Tasker rushed for 7 yards, while also catching 5 passes for 108 yards and a score, giving him his first career 100-yard receiving game (he would only have one more before his retirement after the 1997 season). Holmes rushed for 87 yards and a touchdown, while Tindale compiled 68 yards (more than his entire career regular season total) and a score of his own. McDuffie was the Dolphins top offensive performer with 11 receptions for 154 yards and a touchdown. This was the final game in the career of Dolphins head coach Don Shula, who retired as the NFL's all-time leader in coaching wins. It also marked a continuation of dominance against Miami by Bills coach Marv Levy. Since taking over as Buffalo's coach in 1986, Levy recorded a 17–5 record against the Dolphins, including 3–0 in the playoffs. This was the Bills' last playoff victory until 2020.

This was the third postseason meeting between the Dolphins and Bills. Buffalo won both prior meetings.

Previous playoff games
Buffalo leads 2–0 in all-time playoff games

1990

Miami Dolphins 34 @ Buffalo Bills 44

1990 AFC Divisional playoffs

1992

Buffalo Bills 29 @ Miami Dolphins 10

1992 AFC Championship Game

==== NFC: Philadelphia Eagles 58, Detroit Lions 37 ====
Detroit Lions vs. Philadelphia Eagles – Game summary

Quarter	1	2	3	4	Total
Lions	7	0	14	16	37
Eagles	7	31	13	7	58

at Veterans Stadium, Philadelphia

- Game time: 4:00 p.m. EST
- Game weather: 38 °F (3 °C), clear
- Game attendance: 66,099
- Referee: Ron Blum
- TV announcers (ABC): Al Michaels, Frank Gifford, and Dan Dierdorf

Game information

First quarter

- PHI – Charlie Garner 15-yard run (Gary Anderson kick). Eagles 7–0.
- DET – David Sloan 32-yard pass from Scott Mitchell (Jason Hanson kick). Tied 7–7.

Second quarter

- PHI – Gary Anderson 21-yard field goal. Eagles 10–7.
- PHI – Fred Barnett 22-yard pass from Rodney Peete (Gary Anderson kick). Eagles 17–7.
- PHI – Barry Wilburn 24-yard interception return (Gary Anderson kick). Eagles 24–7.
- PHI – Ricky Watters 1-yard run (Gary Anderson kick). Eagles 31–7.
- PHI – Rob Carpenter 43-yard pass from Rodney Peete (Gary Anderson kick). Eagles 38–7.

Third quarter

- PHI – Ricky Watters 45-yard pass from Rodney Peete (Gary Anderson kick). Eagles 45–7.
- PHI – Gary Anderson 31-yard field goal. Eagles 48–7.
- PHI – Gary Anderson 39-yard field goal. Eagles 51–7.
- DET – Herman Moore 68-yard pass from Don Majkowski (Jason Hanson kick). Eagles 51–14.
- DET – Johnnie Morton 7-yard pass from Don Majkowski (Jason Hanson kick). Eagles 51–21.

Fourth quarter

- PHI – William Thomas 30-yard interception return (Gary Anderson kick). Eagles 58–21.
- DET – David Sloan 2-yard pass from Don Majkowski (Ron Rivers run). Eagles 58–29.
- DET – Ron Rivers 1-yard run (Herman Moore pass from Don Majkowski). Eagles 58–37.

Top passers

- DET – Don Majkowski – 14/23, 206 yards, 3 TD, 2 INT
- PHI – Rodney Peete – 17/25, 270 yards, 3 TD

Top rushers

- DET – Barry Sanders – 10 rushes, 40 yards
- PHI – Charlie Garner – 12 rushes, 78 yards, 1 TD

Top receivers

- DET – Herman Moore – 7 receptions, 133 yards, 1 TD
- PHI – Fred Barnett – 8 receptions, 109 yards, 1 TD

Prior to this game, Detroit tackle Lomas Brown famously guaranteed on television that the Lions would win. The Eagles responded by opening up with a 51–7 lead over the Lions. The Eagles scored 31 points in the second quarter, recorded 6 interceptions, and held running back Barry Sanders to 40 rushing yards en route to a 58–37 victory in the second highest scoring game in NFL postseason history. The Eagles' 58 points were the third highest total in NFL postseason history, behind the Lions' 59 points in 1957 and the Bears' 73 points in the 1940 NFL championship game. Their 31-second quarter points was the second highest single quarter total in a postseason game, behind the Redskins' 35 second quarter points in Super Bowl XXII. Two Redskins players from that game, Barry Wilburn and linebacker Kurt Gouveia were playing on Philadelphia's defense in this one, and both would record an interception in this game.

Philadelphia scored first after Mark McMillian intercepted a pass from Detroit QB Scott Mitchell and returned it 16 yards to the Lions 15-yard line, setting up Charlie Garner's 15-yard touchdown run. Detroit responded with Mitchell's 32-yard touchdown pass to tight end David Sloan. Then Philadelphia exploded in the second quarter, starting with a 30-yard Garner run to set up Gary Anderson's 21-yard field goal. After a punt, the Eagles increased their lead to 17–7 with Rodney Peete's 22-yard touchdown to wide receiver Fred Barnett. Wilburn returned an interception 24 yards for a score less than a minute later, and then Gouveia picked off a pass from Mitchell to give his team a first down at the Lions 34. Following two 13-yard catches by Barnett, Ricky Watters' 1-yard touchdown run made the score 31–7. Later on with just five second left in the half, Eagles receiver Rob Carpenter caught a 43-yard touchdown reception on a Hail Mary pass on 3rd and 25, making the score 38–7 going into halftime.

In the second half, a 45-yard touchdown reception by Watters and two more field goals by Anderson increased the Eagles' lead, 51–7, still with slightly more than nine minutes remaining in the third quarter. From there, backup quarterback Don Majkowski replaced Mitchell and threw a 68-yard touchdown pass to Herman Moore. Then Lions' linebacker Chris Spielman recovered an Eagles' fumble and Majkowski converted it into another touchdown, a 7-yard toss to receiver Johnnie Morton, cutting the score to 51–21. But Philadelphia linebacker William Thomas quickly put any thoughts of a Lions' comeback to rest by returning an interception 30 yards for a touchdown 23 seconds into the fourth quarter. All that lay ahead for the Lions were a pair of meaningless touchdowns, a 2-yard catch by Sloan and a 1-yard run by Ron Rivers to make the final score 58–37.

Peete completed 17 of 25 passes for 270 yards and 3 touchdowns, while also rushing for 17 yards. Barnett caught 8 passes for 109 yards and a touchdown. Watters rushed for 49 yards, caught 3 passes for 64 yards, and scored 2 touchdowns. Lions receiver Herman Moore caught 7 passes for 133 yards and a touchdown.

This was the first postseason meeting between the Lions and Eagles.

=== Sunday, December 31, 1995 ===
==== NFC: Green Bay Packers 37, Atlanta Falcons 20 ====
Atlanta Falcons vs. Green Bay Packers – Game summary

Quarter	1	2	3	4	Total
Falcons	7	3	0	10	20
Packers	14	13	0	10	37

at Lambeau Field, Green Bay, Wisconsin

- Game time: 12:30 p.m. EST/11:30 a.m. CST
- Game weather: 33 °F (1 °C), foggy
- Game attendance: 60,453
- Referee: Dick Hantak
- TV announcers (Fox): Pat Summerall and John Madden

Game information

First quarter

- ATL – Eric Metcalf 65-yard pass from Jeff George (Morten Andersen kick). Falcons 7–0.
- GB – Edgar Bennett 8-yard run (Chris Jacke kick). Tied 7–7.
- GB – Robert Brooks 14-yard pass from Brett Favre (Chris Jacke kick). Packers 14–7.

Second quarter

- ATL – Morten Andersen 31-yard field goal. Packers 14–10.
- GB – Antonio Freeman 76-yard punt return (kick failed). Packers 20–10.
- GB – Mark Chmura 2-yard pass from Brett Favre (Chris Jacke kick), 14:11. Packers 27–10.

Third quarter

- No scoring plays.

Fourth quarter

- ATL – J. J. Birden 27-yard pass from Jeff George (Morten Andersen kick), 0:53. Packers 27–17.
- GB – Dorsey Levens 18-yard pass from Brett Favre (Chris Jacke kick), 7:15. Packers 34–17.
- ATL – Morten Andersen 22-yard field goal, 10:54. Packers 34–20.
- GB – Chris Jacke 25-yard field goal, 13:04. Packers 37–20.

Top passers

- ATL – Jeff George – 30/54, 366 yards, 2 TD, 2 INT
- GB – Brett Favre – 24/35, 199 yards, 3 TD

Top rushers

- ATL – Craig Heyward – 9 rushes, 21 yards
- GB – Edgar Bennett – 24 rushes, 108 yards, 1 TD

Top receivers

- ATL – Eric Metcalf – 8 receptions, 114 yards, 1 TD
- GB – Robert Brooks – 7 receptions, 73 yards, 1 TD

The Packers scored 13 unanswered points in the second quarter en route to a 37–20 victory over the Falcons.

Green Bay got an early scoring opportunity when George Teague intercepted a pass from Falcons quarterback Jeff George and returned it 30 yards to the Atlanta 22-yard line on the second play of the game. However, a 3rd down sack by Chris Doleman pushed the Packers back to the 28 and Chris Jacke missed a 46-yard field goal attempt. Atlanta scored first on quarterback Jeff George's 65-yard touchdown pass to wide receiver Eric Metcalf. But Green Bay countered, starting with Antonio Freeman's 42-yard kickoff return to the Packers 48-yard line. 52 yards and 8 plays later, the Packers scored on Edgar Bennett's 8-yard touchdown run. On Green Bay's next drive, they took advantage of a 35-yard pass interference penalty against Ron Davis, driving 78 yards to score on Brett Favre's 14-yard touchdown pass to Robert Brooks.

On the second play of the second quarter, Morten Andersen's 31-yard field goal made the score 14–10 at the end of a drive that featured a 55-yard completion from George to receiver Terance Mathis. However, Packers wide receiver Antonio Freeman returned a punt 76 yards for a touchdown, and Green Bay extended their lead to 20–10 (after the two-point conversion attempt failed). In the closing minutes of the first half, the Packers marched 85-yards in 14 plays to score on Favre's 2-yard touchdown to tight end Mark Chmura to reach a 27–10 halftime lead.

After the first five drives of the third quarter ended in punts, Atlanta started an 80-yard drive that ended on George's 27-yard touchdown pass to J. J. Birden, making the score 27–17 less than two minutes into the fourth quarter. However, Atlanta's comeback hopes were soon dashed as Green Bay went on to drive 70 yards to score on Favre's 18-yard touchdown pass to running back Dorsey Levens. The key play of the drive was Favre's 20-yard completion to Brooks on 3rd and 8 from the Falcons 45-yard line, Favre's longest completion of the game. All that remained from this point would be a field goal from each team over the next two possessions.

Bennett turned in the best postseason performance of his career, finishing the game with 108 rushing yards, 3 receptions for 11 yards, and a touchdown. Favre threw for 199 yards and 3 touchdowns. Freeman had 72 punt return yards, 54 kickoff return yards, and 14 receiving yards. Metcalf had 227 all-purpose yards (8 receptions for 114 yards, 6 kickoff returns for 107 yards 2 punt returns for 6 yards) and a touchdown.

This was the first postseason meeting between the Falcons and Packers.

==== AFC: Indianapolis Colts 35, San Diego Chargers 20 ====
Indianapolis Colts vs. San Diego Chargers – Game summary

Quarter	1	2	3	4	Total
Colts	0	14	7	14	35
Chargers	3	7	7	3	20

at Jack Murphy Stadium, San Diego

- Game time: 4:00 p.m. EST/1:00 p.m. PST
- Game weather: 66 °F (19 °C), cloudy
- Game attendance: 61,182
- Referee: Gary Lane
- TV announcers (NBC): Dick Enberg, Phil Simms, and Paul Maguire
- Box score

Game information

First quarter

- SD – John Carney 54-yard field goal, 9:28. Chargers 3–0. Drive: 9 plays, 30 yards, 3:25.

Second quarter

- IND – Ken Dilger 2-yard pass from Jim Harbaugh (Cary Blanchard kick), 14:03. Colts 7–3. Drive: 8 plays, 27 yards, 3:45.
- SD – Alfred Pupunu 6-yard pass from Stan Humphries (John Carney kick), 5:48. Chargers 10–7. Drive: 18 plays, 68 yards, 8:15.
- IND – Zack Crockett 33-yard rush (Cary Blanchard kick), 1:47. Colts 14–10. Drive: 8 plays, 80 yards, 4:01.

Third quarter

- SD – Shawn Jefferson 11-yard pass from Stan Humphries (John Carney kick), 4:20. Chargers 17–14. Drive: 12 plays, 90 yards, 6:50.
- IND – Sean Dawkins 42-yard pass from Jim Harbaugh (Cary Blanchard kick), 0:41. Colts 21–17. Drive: 7 plays, 81 yards, 3:39.

Fourth quarter

- SD – John Carney 30-yard field goal, 11:53. Colts 21–20. Drive: 8 plays, 55 yards, 3:48.
- IND – Zack Crockett 66-yard rush (Cary Blanchard kick), 11:28. Colts 28–20. Drive: 1 play, 66 yards, 0:25.
- IND – Jim Harbaugh 3-yard rush (Cary Blanchard kick), 6:55. Colts 35–20. Drive: 6 plays, 23 yards, 3:31.

Top passers

- IND – Jim Harbaugh – 16/27, 175 yards, 2 TD, INT
- SD – Stan Humphries – 23/47, 292 yards, 2 TD, 4 INT

Top rushers

- IND – Zack Crockett – 13 rushes, 147 yards, 2 TD
- SD – Aaron Hayden – 18 rushes, 80 yards

Top receivers

- IND – Floyd Turner – 5 receptions, 64 yards
- SD – Ronnie Harmon – 10 receptions, 133 yards

Rookie fullback Zack Crockett, who had only one rushing attempt during the regular season, found himself thrust into the starting lineup to replace injured starter Marshall Faulk on the first play of the game. He proved up to the task, rushing for a franchise playoff record 147 yards and scoring two touchdowns to help the Colts win their first playoff game in 24 years. San Diego gained 429 yards of total offense, but quarterback Stan Humphries threw four interceptions, two to safety Jason Belser. Chargers running back Ronnie Harmon caught 10 passes for 133 yards, while Andre Coleman added six kickoff returns for 122.

The Chargers jumped to a 3–0 lead on their first drive by moving 30 yards and scoring with John Carney's 54-yard field goal. Later in the period, Colts linebacker Steve Grant intercepted a pass from Humphries and returned it 13 yards to the Chargers 33-yard line. But his team was unable to capitalize on the turnover. Five plays later, San Diego linebacker Junior Seau picked off a pass from Jim Harbaugh at the San Diego 1-yard line.

A 46-yard punt return by Colts cornerback Ray Buchanan to the Chargers 27 set up Harbaugh's 2-yard touchdown pass to tight end Ken Dilger a minute into the second quarter. But San Diego recaptured the lead on their ensuing possession by moving the ball 68 yards in 18 plays, converting five third downs on a drive in which no play gained more than 10 yards. Humphries's 6-yard scoring pass to tight end Alfred Pupunu at the end of it made the score 10–7. However, the Colts came right back with an 80-yard drive in which Harbaugh completed 4 of 5 passes for 43 yards and rushed for 2 before Crockett scored on 33-yard touchdown run to give the Colts a 14–10 lead. The Chargers countered with a drive to Indianapolis's 17-yard line. But with 17 seconds left in the first half, Humphries' pass was intercepted in the end zone by Ray McElroy.

4 minutes into the third quarter, San Diego put together another long scoring drive, this one covering 90 yards in 12 plays, the longest a 24-yard reception by Harmon. Humphries finished it off with an 11-yard touchdown pass to Shawn Jefferson, giving the Chargers a 17–14 lead. Indianapolis quickly struck back with a 7-play, 81-yard drive in which Harbaugh completed 4/5 passes for 67 yards, the last a 42-yarder to wide receiver Sean Dawkins.

In the fourth quarter, runs by Terrell Fletcher and Aaron Hayden for respective gains of 20 and 15 yards set up Carney's 30-yard field goal to cut Indianapolis' lead to 21–20. But on the Colts' next drive, Crockett ran for a 66-yard touchdown and the Colts never looked back. On the Chargers' next possession, Belser intercepted a pass from Humphries and returned it 32 yards to the San Diego 23-yard line. Harbaugh then completed a 21-yard pass to Floyd Turner before taking the ball into the end zone himself on a 3-yard run. The Chargers had three more drives, but they would only result in another Belser interception, a turnover on downs, and time expiring in the game.

This was the first postseason meeting between the Colts and Chargers.

== Divisional round ==
=== Saturday, January 6, 1996 ===
==== AFC: Pittsburgh Steelers 40, Buffalo Bills 21 ====
Buffalo Bills vs. Pittsburgh Steelers – Game summary

Quarter	1	2	3	4	Total
Bills	0	7	7	7	21
Steelers	7	16	3	14	40

at Three Rivers Stadium, Pittsburgh, Pennsylvania

- Game time: 12:30 p.m. EST
- Game weather: 21 °F (−6 °C), clear
- Game attendance: 59,072
- Referee: Larry Nemmers
- TV announcers (NBC): Marv Albert and Cris Collinsworth

Game information

First quarter

- PIT – John L. Williams 1-yard run (Norm Johnson kick). Steelers 7–0.

Second quarter

- PIT – Ernie Mills 10-yard pass from Neil O'Donnell (Norm Johnson kick). Steelers 14–0.
- PIT – Norm Johnson 45-yard field goal. Steelers 17–0.
- PIT – Norm Johnson 38-yard field goal. Steelers 20–0.
- BUF – Thurman Thomas 1-yard run (Steve Christie kick). Steelers 20–7.
- PIT – Norm Johnson 34-yard field goal. Steelers 23–7.

Third quarter

- PIT – Norm Johnson 39-yard field goal. Steelers 26–7.
- BUF – Tony Cline 2-yard pass from Alex Van Pelt (Steve Christie kick). Steelers 26–14.

Fourth quarter

- BUF – Thurman Thomas 9-yard pass from Jim Kelly (Steve Christie kick). Steelers 26–21.
- PIT – Bam Morris 13-yard run (Norm Johnson kick). Steelers 33–21.
- PIT – Bam Morris 2-yard run (Norm Johnson kick). Steelers 40–21.

Top passers

- BUF – Jim Kelly – 14/29, 135 yards, TD, 3 INT
- PIT – Neil O'Donnell – 19/35, 262 yards, TD, 2 INT

Top rushers

- BUF – Thurman Thomas – 14 rushes, 46 yards, TD
- PIT – Bam Morris – 25 rushes, 106 yards, 2 TD

Top receivers

- BUF – Steve Tasker – 2 receptions, 38 yards
- PIT – Yancey Thigpen – 3 receptions, 77 yards

Running back Bam Morris scored two touchdowns in the fourth quarter as the Steelers stopped the Bills, minus Hall of Fame defensive end Bruce Smith who fell ill the day before the game, from coming back from a 20–0 deficit. By the end of the game, the Steelers outgained them in total yards 409–250 and forced four turnovers.

Pittsburgh started off the scoring with a 76-yard drive in which receiver Yancy Thigpen caught a 43-yard pass and fullback John L. Williams finished it off with a 1-yard touchdown run. The Bills responded with a drive to the Steelers 21-yard line, but then Darick Holmes was tackled for a 13-yard loss by safety Carnell Lake and Steve Christie missed a 52-yard field goal attempt. Morris then rushed for 44 yards on a 58-yard possession that ended on Neil O'Donnell's 13-yard touchdown completion to Ernie Mills.

Early in the second quarter, Steelers receiver Andre Hastings returned a punt 12 yards to the Bills 43-yard line, setting up Norm Johnson's 45-yard field goal. Now facing a 17–0 deficit, the Bills offense self-destructed on their next drive. Facing 3rd and 8, Jim Kelly was sacked by linebacker Kevin Greene and fumbled the ball. Center Kent Hull recovered the fumble for Buffalo, but it didn't help much. On the next play, Lee Flowers stormed into the backfield and tackled punter Chris Mohr on the Bills 12-yard line, leading to another Johnson field goal that gave Pittsburgh a 20–0 lead. Buffalo responded with a drive to the Steelers 30-yard line, only to lose the ball when Lake forced a fumble from Thurman Thomas that was recovered by Chris Oldham. However, the Bills soon got the ball back with excellent field position after Rohn Stark punted the ball 33 yards to the Steelers 49. Kelly then got the team to the 1-yard line with three completions, hitting Tony Cline for 17 yards, Andre Reed for 5, and Steve Tasker for 26. Thomas then ran the ball into the end zone, cutting the score to 20–7. Only 45 seconds remained in the half, but O'Donnell proved up to the challenge of earning his team some more points, completing 4 consecutive passes for 53 yards to get the team to the Bills 16-yard line. Johnson finished the drive with his third field goal, giving the Steelers a 23–7 halftime lead.

In the third quarter, Lake intercepted a pass from Kelly and returned it 3 yards to the Buffalo 25-yard line, leading to Johnson's fourth field goal that put the team up 26–7. Both teams had to punt on their following drives, and Tasker returned Stark's 30-yard punt 4 yards to the Steelers 42-yard line. A few plays later, he took a handoff on a reverse and ran 40 yards to the 3. Alex Van Pelt (who replaced an injured Jim Kelly) finished the drive with 2-yard touchdown pass to Cline, making the score 26–14.

Early in the fourth quarter, Buffalo took advantage of yet another poor punt from Stark, this one a 31-yard kick that gave them the ball on the Pittsburgh 36. Van Pelt then guided the team to the 11-yard line, where Kelly returned to the field and eventually hit Thomas for a 9-yard scoring completion, cutting the score to 26–21 with 11:23 left in the game. But Pittsburgh then marched 76 yards, including O'Donnell's 3rd down conversion passes to Thigpen and Andre Hastings for gains of 21 and 17 yards, to score on Morris' 13-yard touchdown run, increasing their lead to 33–21. The following three drives would result in interceptions, with Kelly throwing a pick to Jerry Olsavsky and Matt Darby nabbing a pass from O'Donnell. On the next play, Linebacker Levon Kirkland intercepted a pass from Kelly and returned it 4 yards to the Bills 23-yard line to set up Morris' 2-yard score with 1:58 remaining to clinch the victory.

With the Steelers win, they snapped the Bills' 10 game postseason winning streak against the AFC dating back to 1990. Morris rushed for 106 yards and caught 2 passes for 7. Lake had an interception and a fumble recovery.

This was the third postseason meeting between the Bills and Steelers. Both teams split the first two meetings.

Previous playoff games
Tied 1–1 in all-time playoff games

1974

Buffalo Bills 14 @ Pittsburgh Steelers 32

1974 AFC Divisional playoffs

1992

Buffalo Bills 24 @ Pittsburgh Steelers 3

1992 AFC Divisional playoffs

==== NFC: Green Bay Packers 27, San Francisco 49ers 17 ====
Green Bay Packers vs. San Francisco 49ers – Game summary

Quarter	1	2	3	4	Total
Packers	14	7	3	3	27
49ers	0	3	7	7	17

at 3Com Park at Candlestick Point, San Francisco

- Game time: 4:00 p.m. EST/1:00 p.m. PST
- Game weather: 59 °F (15 °C), clear
- Game attendance: 69,311
- Referee: Bob McElwee
- TV announcers (Fox): Dick Stockton and Matt Millen

Game information

First quarter

- GB – Craig Newsome 31-yard fumble return (Chris Jacke kick). Packers 7–0.
- GB – Keith Jackson 3-yard pass from Brett Favre (Chris Jacke kick). Packers 14–0.

Second quarter

- GB – Mark Chmura 13-yard pass from Brett Favre (Chris Jacke kick). Packers 21–0.
- SF – Jeff Wilkins 21-yard field goal. Packers 21–3.

Third quarter

- SF – Steve Young 1-yard run (Jeff Wilkins kick). Packers 21–10.
- GB – Chris Jacke 27-yard field goal. Packers 24–10.

Fourth quarter

- GB – Chris Jacke 26-yard field goal. Packers 27–10.
- SF – Derek Loville 2-yard run (Jeff Wilkins kick). Packers 27–17.

Top passers

- GB – Brett Favre – 21/28, 299 yards, 2 TD
- SF – Steve Young – 32/65, 328 yards, 2 INT

Top rushers

- GB – Edgar Bennett – 23 rushes, 51 yards
- SF – Steve Young – 9 rushes, 77 yards, TD

Top receivers

- GB – Robert Brooks – 4 receptions, 103 yards
- SF – Jerry Rice – 11 receptions, 117 yards

For the first time ever since becoming the head coach of the Packers, Mike Holmgren was coaching against his former team where he was the Offensive Coordinator and Quarterbacks coach for six seasons.

The Packers jumped to a 21–0 lead en route to a 27–17 victory. Green Bay quarterback Brett Favre threw for 222 yards in the first half, and ended up with completing 21 out of 28 passes for 299 yards and two touchdowns. Receiver Robert Brooks caught four passes for 103 yards. Meanwhile, their defense sacked 49ers quarterback Steve Young three times and intercepted him twice. Young ended up setting a playoff record with 65 pass attempts, but completed only 32 of them for 328 yards. He added 77 yards on the ground. For the second playoff game in a row, Green Bay did not lose any turnovers, while the 49ers turned the ball over 4 times.

The Packers took the opening kickoff and held onto the ball for 7:11 before kicker Chris Jacke's 44-yard field goal attempt was blocked by 49ers safety Tim McDonald. But on San Francisco's first play, running back Adam Walker fumbled after being hit by linebacker Wayne Simmons. Rookie cornerback Craig Newsome picked up the ball and returned it 31 yards for the touchdown. Then after forcing the 49ers to punt, the Packers advanced 62 yards, with Favre completing a 35-yard pass to tight end Keith Jackson and a 20-yarder to Brooks, to score on Favre's 3-yard touchdown to Jackson, who finished the day with four receptions for 101 yards.

Green Bay would later drive 72 yards in 7 plays to score on tight end Mark Chmura's 13-yard touchdown reception before Young's 32-yard completion to Jerry Rice set up Jeff Wilkins 21–3 field goal to cut the lead to 21–3 at the end of the half. In the second half, Jacke kicked two field goals while the 49ers could only manage two touchdowns: a 1-yard run by Young and a 2-yarder by running back Derek Loville.

This was the only time during the 1990s that an NFC team won a divisional playoff game on the road. Rice finished the game with 11 receptions for 117 yards, while 49ers tight end Brent Jones had 8 catches for 112.

This was the first postseason meeting between the Packers and 49ers.

=== Sunday, January 7, 1996 ===
==== NFC: Dallas Cowboys 30, Philadelphia Eagles 11 ====
Philadelphia Eagles vs. Dallas Cowboys – Game summary

Quarter	1	2	3	4	Total
Eagles	0	3	0	8	11
Cowboys	3	14	6	7	30

at Texas Stadium, Irving, Texas

- Game time: 12:30 p.m. EST/11:30 a.m. CST
- Game weather: 32 °F (0 °C), clear
- Game attendance: 64,371
- Referee: Gerald Austin
- TV announcers (Fox): Pat Summerall and John Madden

Game information

First quarter

- DAL – Chris Boniol 24-yard field goal. Cowboys 3–0.

Second quarter

- PHI – Gary Anderson 26-yard field goal. Tied 3–3.
- DAL – Deion Sanders 21-yard run (Chris Boniol kick). Cowboys 10–3.
- DAL – Emmitt Smith 1-yard run (Chris Boniol kick). Cowboys 17–3.

Third quarter

- DAL – Chris Boniol 18-yard field goal. Cowboys 20–3.
- DAL – Chris Boniol 51-yard field goal. Cowboys 23–3.

Fourth quarter

- DAL – Michael Irvin 9-yard pass from Troy Aikman (Chris Boniol kick). Cowboys 30–3.
- PHI – Randall Cunningham 4-yard run (Reggie Johnson pass from Randall Cunningham). Cowboys 30–11.

Top passers

- PHI – Randall Cunningham – 11/26, 161 yards, INT
- DAL – Troy Aikman – 17/24, 253 yards, TD, INT

Top rushers

- PHI – Ricky Watters – 13 rushes, 39 yards
- DAL – Emmitt Smith – 21 rushes, 99 yards, TD

Top receivers

- PHI – Calvin Williams – 5 receptions, 56 yards
- DAL – Kevin Williams – 6 receptions, 124 yards

With Eagles starting quarterback Rodney Peete injured early on, the Cowboys held Philadelphia to only 227 yards and 11 points.

The Cowboys scored on their second drive of the game, moving the ball 37 yards to Chris Boniol's 24-yard field goal. Following an Eagles punt, Mark McMillian intercepted a pass from Dallas quarterback Troy Aikman and returned it 34 yards to the Cowboys 43, setting up Gary Anderson's 26-yard field goal on the first play of the second quarter. On Philadelphia's field goal drive, Peete suffered a concussion when he was tackled by Darren Woodson one yard short of a first down on the Dallas 9-yard line, knocking him out of the game and Randall Cunningham replaced him.

In the second quarter, Dallas running back Emmitt Smith rushed four times for 25 yards and caught a 22-yard reception on a 70-yard drive that Deion Sanders finished with a 21-yard touchdown on an end-around run. The Eagles managed just one first down before punting. Cowboys then marched 79 yards, including a Troy Aikman's completions of 37 and 26 yards to receiver Kevin Williams and fullback Daryl Johnston. Johnston's catch gave the team a first down on the Eagles 1-yard line, and Smith ran the ball into the end zone on the next play, giving the team a 17–3 lead with 3:42 left in the half.

Williams returned the second half kickoff 24 yards, and then caught a 34-yard pass as his team drove 59 yards to score on Boniol's 18-yard field goal, making the score 20–3. On Dallas' next drive, they upped their lead to 23–3 with Boniol's franchise record 51-yard field goal.

In the fourth quarter, Sanders intercepted a pass from Cunningham and returned it 12 yards to the Eagles 21-yard line, leading to their final score on Aikman's 9-yard pass to Michael Irvin. The Eagles responded as Cunningham completed 4/5 passes for 63 yards before taking the ball into the end zone himself on a 4-yard run. He also completed a pass for a 2-point conversion, but by then only 2:36 remained in the game.

Aikman finished the game 17/24 for 253 yards and a touchdown, with one interception. Irvin, who was double teamed most of the game, had only one reception, but Williams caught 6 passes for 124 yards and returned 2 kickoffs for 45. Smith rushed for 99 yards and a touchdown, while also catching 3 passes for 40. Eagles running back Ricky Watters, who rushed for 1,273 yards during the season, finished this game with just 39 yards on 13 attempts, though he also caught 4 passes for 45 yards. As of the end of the 2022 season, this is the most recent Divisional Playoff win for the Cowboys. They have lost seven of those games since (1996, 2007, 2009, 2014, 2016, 2018 and 2022).

This was the third postseason meeting between the Eagles and Cowboys. Both teams split the first two meetings.

Previous playoff games
Tied 1–1 in all-time playoff games

1980

Dallas Cowboys 7 @ Philadelphia Eagles 20

1980 NFC Championship Game

1992

Philadelphia Eagles 10 @ Dallas Cowboys 34

1992 NFC Divisional playoffs

==== AFC: Indianapolis Colts 10, Kansas City Chiefs 7 ====
Indianapolis Colts vs. Kansas City Chiefs – Game summary

Quarter	1	2	3	4	Total
Colts	0	7	3	0	10
Chiefs	7	0	0	0	7

at Arrowhead Stadium, Kansas City, Missouri

- Game time: 4:00 p.m. EST/3:00 p.m. CST
- Game weather: 14 °F (−10 °C), clear
- Game attendance: 77,594
- Referee: Jerry Markbreit
- TV announcers (NBC): Dick Enberg, Phil Simms, and Paul Maguire

Game information

First quarter

- KC – Lake Dawson 20-yard pass from Steve Bono (Lin Elliott kick). Chiefs 7–0.

Second quarter

- IND – Floyd Turner 5-yard pass from Jim Harbaugh (Cary Blanchard kick). Tied 7–7.

Third quarter

- IND – Cary Blanchard 30-yard field goal. Colts 10–7.

Fourth quarter

- No scoring plays.

Top passers

- IND – Jim Harbaugh – 12/27, 112 yards, TD, INT
- KC – Steve Bono – 11/25, 122 yards, TD, 3 INT

Top rushers

- IND – Lamont Warren – 20 rushes, 76 yards
- KC – Marcus Allen – 21 rushes, 94 yards

Top receivers

- IND – Sean Dawkins – 4 receptions, 37 yards
- KC – Lake Dawson – 4 receptions, 70 yards, TD

The Chiefs, who held the league's best record during the regular season (13–3), were heavily favored to beat the 9–7 Colts, particularly since Indianapolis star running back Marshall Faulk was inactive due to injury, along with defensive tackle Tony Siragusa due to illness. But by the end of the game, Kansas City lost four turnovers and kicker Lin Elliott missed three field goals en route to a 10–7 Colts upset.

After the first four possessions of the game resulted in punts, Kansas City scored on quarterback Steve Bono's 20-yard touchdown to wide receiver Lake Dawson with 29 seconds left in the first quarter on a drive that covered 62 yards in 5 plays. Indianapolis countered with a long methodical 18-play drive in which they converted five third downs and one fourth down on the way to Jim Harbaugh's 5-yard touchdown pass to receiver Floyd Turner to tie the game. Harbaugh had made several key plays on the drive, converting a 3rd and 11 with an 18-yard scramble and three plays later finding receiver Aaron Bailey for a 13-yard completion on 3rd and 10. Running back Lamont Warren also made a big play by converting a 4th and 1 situation with a 4-yard gain. Later on, Colts kicker Cary Blanchard missed a 47-yard field goal attempt with 57 seconds left in the half. Kansas City then drove to the Colts 17-yard line, only to have Elliott hit the uprights from 35 yards out.

In the third period, Ashley Ambrose intercepted a pass from Bono at midfield, setting up Blanchard's 30-yard field goal to give his team the lead. Early in the fourth quarter, the Chiefs reached the Indianapolis 22-yard line, but all they got was another missed field goal, this one from 39 yards with 10:36 left to play. Indianapolis failed to gain a first down with their next two drives, while Bono threw consecutive interceptions, one to linebacker Quentin Coryatt and another to cornerback Eugene Daniel. After the Coryatt interception, the Colts had a chance to increase their lead, but Blanchard missed a field goal attempt from 49 yards out. With 4:12 left in the game, Rich Gannon replaced Bono and led the Chiefs from their own 18 to the Colts 25-yard line. But with 42 seconds left, Elliott missed his third field goal of the day, a 42-yard attempt, and Indianapolis escaped with a win.

This was the first postseason meeting between the Colts and Chiefs.

== Conference championships ==
=== Sunday, January 14, 1996 ===
==== AFC: Pittsburgh Steelers 20, Indianapolis Colts 16 ====
Indianapolis Colts vs. Pittsburgh Steelers – Game summary

Quarter	1	2	3	4	Total
Colts	3	3	3	7	16
Steelers	3	7	3	7	20

at Three Rivers Stadium, Pittsburgh

- Game time: 12:30 p.m. EST
- Game weather: 50 °F (10 °C), clear
- Game attendance: 61,062
- Referee: Bernie Kukar
- TV announcers (NBC): Dick Enberg, Phil Simms, and Paul Maguire

Game information

First quarter

- IND – Cary Blanchard 34-yard field goal. Colts 3–0.
- PIT – Norm Johnson 31-yard field goal. Tied 3–3.

Second quarter

- IND – Cary Blanchard 36-yard field goal. Colts 6–3.
- PIT – Kordell Stewart 5-yard pass from Neil O'Donnell (Norm Johnson kick). Steelers 10–6.

Third quarter

- IND – Cary Blanchard 37-yard field goal. Steelers 10–9.
- PIT – Norm Johnson 36-yard field goal. Steelers 13–9.

Fourth quarter

- IND – Floyd Turner 47-yard pass from Jim Harbaugh (Cary Blanchard kick). Colts 16–13.
- PIT – Bam Morris 1-yard run (Norm Johnson kick). Steelers 20–16.

Top passers

- IND – Jim Harbaugh – 21/33, 267 yards, TD
- PIT – Neil O'Donnell – 25/41, 205 yards, TD, INT

Top rushers

- IND – Lamont Warren – 15 rushes, 53 yards
- PIT – Erric Pegram – 10 rushes, 46 yards

Top receivers

- IND – Sean Dawkins – 7 receptions, 96 yards
- PIT – Yancey Thigpen – 6 receptions, 65 yards

On the Steelers opening drive, Neil O'Donnell's first pass of the game was tipped by defensive tackle Tony Siragusa and intercepted by Jeff Herrod, who returned it to the Pittsburgh 24-yard line. But the Colts drive was halted when Ray Seals tackled running back Lamont Warren for a loss on third down and one. On the next play, Cary Blanchard hit the right upright on his 34-yard field goal, but it still bounced in and the Colts took a 3–0 lead. After each team punted, Pittsburgh's Norm Johnson kicked a field goal to even the game with under two minutes left in the first quarter. The field goal occurred after Kordell Stewart dropped a pass in the end zone. Replays showed Colts safety Jason Belser made contact with Stewart just before the ball arrived, but no penalty flag was thrown.

In the second quarter, a 30-yard reception by Colts receiver Sean Dawkins set up Blanchard's second field goal. But later on, Pittsburgh drove 80 yards in 17 plays, featuring three third down conversion runs by Kordell Stewart, and scored on O'Donnell's 5-yard third and goal touchdown pass to Stewart with 13 seconds left in the half to make it 10–6. Replays showed Stewart had put half a foot out of bounds before making the catch, which would have made him an ineligible receiver, but the penalty was not called.

On Indianapolis' first drive of the second half, they drove 61 yards in nine plays, featuring a 29-yard completion from Jim Harbaugh to tight end Ken Dilger. Blanchard finished the drive with his third field goal to cut their deficit to 10–9. Then after forcing a three and out, Indy drove 35 yards in nine plays to set up another field goal try, which would have put the Colts up 12–10. But this time Blanchard's 47-yard attempt sailed wide right. Taking over on their own 37, Pittsburgh mounted a drive in Colts territory where Johnson's 37-yard field goal put them back up by four points, at 13–9.

Early in the fourth quarter, a long punt return by Steelers receiver Andre Hastings gave them the ball at midfield. But all they got out of their great field position was a missed field goal. After that, Harbaugh threw a 47-yard touchdown pass to wide receiver Floyd Turner to take the lead, 16–13. After a Steelers punt, their defense got a big chance when Warren fumbled deep in Colts territory, but guard Joe Staysniak recovered the ball in mid-air to keep the drive going. Later on, cornerback Willie Williams tackled Warren behind the line on third down and one to force a punt, giving Pittsburgh the ball back with 3:03 left in the game.

Pittsburgh then marched 67 yards to score the winning touchdown. Running back Byron Bam Morris scored the game-winning 1-yard touchdown run with 1:34 remaining in the game to pull Pittsburgh ahead for good. The drive was aided by O'Donnell's 9-yard completion to Hastings on fourth down and 3 from the 47-yard line, as well as an earlier dropped potential interception that went in and out of the arms of linebacker Quentin Coryatt. On the next play after Hastings' fourth down conversion catch, O'Donnell completed a 37-yard pass to Ernie Mills on the Indianapolis 1-yard line, setting up Morris' 1-yard scoring run. The Colts got the ball back and advanced to the Steelers' 29 with 5 seconds left, narrowly avoiding a turnover when Chris Oldham dropped a wide open interception. On the game's final play, Harbaugh attempted a hail mary pass which he lofted high and came down into a crowd of players in the end zone; the ball momentarily was against the Colts' WR Aaron Bailey's chest but it hit the turf before he could haul it in.

The Colts were the first No. 5 seed to advance to a conference championship game since the 1990 playoff expansion. Harbaugh completed 21 of 33 passes for 267 yards and a touchdown.

The game was featured as one of the NFL's Greatest Games as 60 Minutes. It marked the end of a thrilling and hard-fought season for the Colts, in which 15 of their 19 games were decided by one score, including three that went into overtime.

This was the third postseason meeting between the Colts and Steelers. Pittsburgh won both previous meetings when the Colts were previously in Baltimore.

Previous playoff games
Pittsburgh leads 2–0 in all-time playoff games

1975

Baltimore Colts 10 @ Pittsburgh Steelers 28

1975 AFC Divisional playoffs

1976

Pittsburgh Steelers 40 @ Baltimore Colts 14

1976 AFC Divisional playoffs

==== NFC: Dallas Cowboys 38, Green Bay Packers 27 ====
Green Bay Packers vs. Dallas Cowboys – Game summary

Quarter	1	2	3	4	Total
Packers	10	7	10	0	27
Cowboys	14	10	0	14	38

at Texas Stadium, Irving, Texas

- Game time: 4:00 p.m. EST/3:00 p.m. CST
- Game weather: 78 °F (26 °C), clear
- Game attendance: 65,135
- Referee: Ed Hochuli
- TV announcers (Fox): Pat Summerall and John Madden

Game information

First quarter

- GB – Chris Jacke 46-yard field goal. Packers 3–0.
- DAL – Michael Irvin 6-yard pass from Troy Aikman (Chris Boniol kick). Cowboys 7–3.
- DAL – Michael Irvin 4-yard pass from Troy Aikman (Chris Boniol kick). Cowboys 14–3.
- GB – Robert Brooks 73-yard pass from Brett Favre (Chris Jacke kick). Cowboys 14–10.

Second quarter

- GB – Keith Jackson 24-yard pass from Brett Favre (Chris Jacke kick). Packers 17–14.
- DAL – Chris Boniol 34-yard field goal. Tied 17–17.
- DAL – Emmitt Smith 1-yard run (Chris Boniol kick). Cowboys 24–17.

Third quarter

- GB – Chris Jacke 37-yard field goal. Cowboys 24–20.

Fourth quarter

- GB – Robert Brooks 1-yard pass from Brett Favre (Chris Jacke kick). Packers 27–24.
- DAL – Emmitt Smith 5-yard run (Chris Boniol kick). Cowboys 31–27.
- DAL – Emmitt Smith 16-yard run (Chris Boniol kick). Cowboys 38–27.

Top passers

- GB – Brett Favre – 21/39, 307 yards, 3 TD, 2 INT
- DAL – Troy Aikman – 21/33, 255 yards, 2 TD

Top rushers

- GB – Edgar Bennett – 9 rushes, 46 yards
- DAL – Emmitt Smith – 35 rushes, 150 yards, 3 TD

Top receivers

- GB – Robert Brooks – 6 receptions, 105 yards, 2 TD
- DAL – Michael Irvin – 7 receptions, 100 yards, 2 TD

Running back Emmitt Smith rushed for 150 rushing yards and 3 touchdowns, while also catching 2 passes for 17 yards as the Cowboys overcame a Packers 27–24 lead in the fourth quarter.

Green Bay got off to a slow start as league MVP quarterback Brett Favre threw incompletions on his first six pass attempts of the game and the team failed to gain any yards on their first 9 plays. However, Packers linebacker Bernardo Harris blocked a punt from John Jett on the game's opening drive that gave the team the ball at the Dallas 23 and enabled them to score first on Chris Jacke's 46-yard field goal. Dallas stormed right back with an 11-play, 80-yard drive, featuring a 35-yard reception by Deion Sanders. Troy Aikman finished the drive with a 6-yard touchdown pass to Michael Irvin. Then Dallas defensive tackle Leon Lett intercepted a screen pass from Favre on the Packers 13, and they scored another touchdown on Aikman's 4-yard throw to Irvin, giving the team a 14–3 lead. However, Favre's first completion of the day turned out to be a big one, a 73-yard touchdown bomb to Robert Brooks. Dallas was forced to punt on their next drive, and Antonio Freeman gave his team great field position with a 39-yard return, with an additional 15 yards coming from a facemask penalty on Jett. This gave the Packers the ball on the Dallas 35, and two plays into the second quarter, Favre threw a 24-yard touchdown pass to tight end Keith Jackson. Despite only holding the ball for 2:53 in the first quarter, Green Bay now had the lead at 17–14.

The Cowboys responded with two long drives for 10 points and a 24–17 halftime lead. Chris Boniol tied the game with his 29th consecutive field goal, putting it through the uprights from 34 yards to conclude a 60-yard drive. Packers punter Craig Hentrich subsequently pinned Dallas back at their own 1-yard line with a 57-yard kick, but Smith bailed his team out with a 25-yard run on the next play, starting off a playoff-record 99-yard drive. Irvin made two big receptions on it, converting the drive's only third down with a 10-yard catch and later hauling in a pass for a 28-yard gain on the Packers 16-yard line. With 24 seconds left in the half, Smith finished the drive with a 1-yard touchdown run.

Personal fouls against Lett and Dixon Edwards helped start two Green Bay scoring drives in the third quarter. They opened the half with a 52-yard drive to score on Jacke's 37-yard field goal. The next time they got the ball, Favre's 54-yard completion to tight end Keith Jackson set up his 1-yard touchdown pass to Brooks that gave the Packers a 27–24 lead. Dallas regained the lead a few plays into the fourth quarter after Smith's 5-yard touchdown run capped off a 90-yard possession. Green Bay responded with a drive past midfield, but Cowboys cornerback Larry Brown put an end to it by intercepting Favre's pass and returning it 28 yards to the Dallas 48. Irvin made a juggling reception near the sidelines for a 36-yard gain on the next play, and then Smith took the ball into the end zone with a 16-yard run to ice the game. Green Bay's final two possessions would each end with a turnover on downs.

Aikman completed 21 of 33 passes for 255 yards and two touchdowns. Irvin caught 7 passes for 100 yards and 2 scores. Favre threw for 307 yards and 3 touchdowns, with 2 interceptions. Brooks finished the game with 6 receptions for 105 yards and 2 touchdowns. Freeman had 212 all-purpose yards (10 rec, 148 KR, 54 PR)

After the contest, Reggie White was so visibly upset, he started shouting at television crews who were filming him on the sidelines. This was the third consecutive year that Dallas eliminated Green Bay from the playoffs (all three games were played in Dallas). "We keep coming down here and getting lessons," said Packers coach Mike Holmgren, whose team had lost six in a row in Dallas since October 1993. "I'm tired of getting lessons."

Meanwhile, the Cowboys were jubilant about making their third Super Bowl appearance in the last four seasons. "We're going home", Irvin said after the game. "We let somebody else borrow our house last year, but we're going back where we belong. I'm going to check the lease, make sure they cleaned up after themselves."

This was the sixth postseason meeting between the Packers and Cowboys. Dallas had won three of the prior five meetings. This was also their latest playoff victory against Green Bay, as the Packers would go on to win 3 straight playoff games against the Cowboys after that.

Previous playoff games
Dallas leads 3–2 in all-time playoff games

1966

Green Bay Packers 34 @ Dallas Cowboys 27

1966 NFL Championship Game

1967

Dallas Cowboys 17 @ Green Bay Packers 21

1967 NFL Championship Game

1982

Green Bay Packers 26 @ Dallas Cowboys 37

1982 NFC Second Round playoffs

1993

Green Bay Packers 17 @ Dallas Cowboys 27

1993 NFC Divisional playoffs

1994

Green Bay Packers 9 @ Dallas Cowboys 35

1994 NFC Divisional playoffs

== Super Bowl XXX: Dallas Cowboys 27, Pittsburgh Steelers 17 ==
Super Bowl XXX – Dallas Cowboys vs. Pittsburgh Steelers – Game summary

Quarter	1	2	3	4	Total
Cowboys (NFC)	10	3	7	7	27
Steelers (AFC)	0	7	0	10	17

at Sun Devil Stadium, Tempe, Arizona

- Date: January 28, 1996
- Game attendance: 76,347
- Referee: Red Cashion
- TV announcers (NBC): Dick Enberg, Phil Simms and Paul Maguire

This was an NFL-leading third Super Bowl meeting between the Cowboys and Steelers. Pittsburgh won both previous meetings.

Previous playoff games
Pittsburgh leads 2–0 in all-time playoff games

1975

Dallas Cowboys 17 vs. Pittsburgh Steelers 21

Super Bowl X

1978

Pittsburgh Steelers 35 vs. Dallas Cowboys 31

Super Bowl XIII
