= 1995 AFC Championship Game =

1995 NFL playoff sporting event

1995 AFC Championship
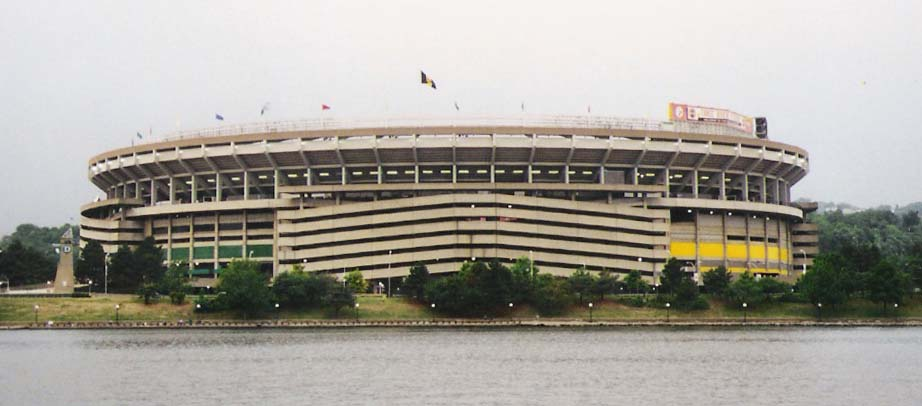
- Three Rivers Stadium, the site of the game
Indianapolis Colts (5) (9–7)	Pittsburgh Steelers (2) (11–5)
16	20
Head coach: Ted Marchibroda	Head coach: Bill Cowher
	1	2	3	4	Total
IND	3	3	3	7	16
PIT	3	7	3	7	20
- Date: January 14, 1996
- Stadium: Three Rivers Stadium; Pittsburgh, Pennsylvania
- Favorite: Steelers by 11
- Referee: Bernie Kukar
- Attendance: 61,062

TV in the United States
- Network: NBC
- Announcers: Dick Enberg, Phil Simms, and Paul Maguire

The 1995 AFC Championship Game was the championship game for the American Football Conference (AFC) for the 1995 season. The game was played on January 14, 1996, at Three Rivers Stadium in Pittsburgh, home of the Pittsburgh Steelers, who hosted the Indianapolis Colts for the chance to play the winner of the National Football Conference (NFC) in Super Bowl XXX in Tempe, Arizona. This game is also known The Immaculate Deflection.

While it was considered a mismatch between an expected Super Bowl contender (Pittsburgh) and a Cinderella team (Indianapolis) in the week leading up to the game, it turned out to be very competitive, going down to the last play of the game when Colts quarterback Jim Harbaugh threw a Hail Mary pass that was ruled a dropped pass by officials in the end zone by the intended receiver, Aaron Bailey. The dropped pass gave the Steelers a 20–16 victory and sent them to Super Bowl XXX, the team's first Super Bowl appearance since Super Bowl XIV sixteen years earlier.

The game marked a turning point for both franchises. For Steelers head coach Bill Cowher, it was the first of only two times the Steelers advanced to the Super Bowl during his 15-year tenure, as the team hosted the AFC Championship Game five times between 1994 and 2004 but lost their other four appearances. Their other AFC Championship win was a road game in 2005, and they eventually won Super Bowl XL in that season. For the Colts, it marked a brief period of success in the mid-1990s for a franchise that otherwise struggled between its 1984 move to Indianapolis (as well as the team's last few years in Baltimore before that) and the team drafting Peyton Manning with the number one overall pick in the 1998 NFL draft.

The game has been ranked among the best Conference Championship games in the history of the National Football League by several publications, including Sports Illustrated, ESPN, AOL, and several local publications throughout the United States. NFL Films went on to feature the game in both its ongoing NFL Films Game of the Week and NFL's Greatest Games series.

== Background ==
Entering the 1995 NFL season, the Pittsburgh Steelers were a favorite to make it to the Super Bowl following a 12–4 regular season the year before behind its "Blitzburgh" defense that saw the team upset by the San Diego Chargers 17–13 in the 1994 AFC Championship Game. However, the team got off to a slow start, starting the 1995 season at 3–4 before ripping through the NFL on an eight-game winning streak. The team's last regular season loss was in Week 17 against the Green Bay Packers, 24–19 at Lambeau Field, a game that had no playoff implications since both teams had already clinched their respective playoff seedings entering the game. The Steelers' 11–5 record was good enough for the AFC Central Division championship (four games ahead of the Cincinnati Bengals and Houston Oilers) and the conference's number 2 seed, earning a first-round bye in the playoffs.

The Colts were coming off an 8–8 season in 1994 that was the team's best record since 1987, when the team won the AFC East with a 9–6 record during the strike-shortened season. Aside from the 1987 season, the Colts had not appeared in the playoffs since 1977 when the team was in Baltimore. Behind veteran quarterback Jim Harbaugh, the 1995 season would change that, as several come-from-behind victories propelled the team to a 9–7 record and the number 5 seed in the AFC playoffs.

When the playoffs started, the Steelers defeated the Buffalo Bills 40–21 in the divisional round to advance to their second consecutive AFC Championship Game. Meanwhile, the Colts defeated the defending AFC champion San Diego Chargers 35–20 at Jack Murphy Stadium, then pulled off the upset by defeating the top-seeded Kansas City Chiefs 10–7 at Arrowhead Stadium. The upset of the Chiefs meant that the AFC Championship Game would be a home game for the Steelers instead of traveling to Kansas City for the AFC Championship Game. The upset also marked the Colts' first AFC Championship Game appearance in 24 years, since the then-Baltimore Colts lost to the Miami Dolphins 21–0 in 1971.

The Colts were the first number 5 seed to advance to a conference championship game since the 1990 playoff expansion. It marked the first time since the 1970 merger that no team that was a member of the American Football League at any point in its history participated in the AFC Championship Game, as both the Colts and Steelers were with the "old" NFL before moving to the newly formed AFC in 1970 to even out the two conferences. (Since then, only the 2008 AFC Championship Game between the Steelers and their archrivals, the Baltimore Ravens, has the AFC title been played for between two non-AFL teams.) The game was a rematch of the Week 3 contest between the two teams from the previous season, which the Steelers won at home, 31–21. The 1995 AFC Championship Game was the second of four consecutive seasons in which the two teams met in Pittsburgh, an uncommon sight for non-division rivals.

== Game summary ==
On the Steelers opening drive, Neil O'Donnell's first pass of the game was tipped by defensive tackle Tony Siragusa and intercepted by Jeff Herrod, who returned it to the Pittsburgh 24-yard line. The Colts' drive was halted when Ray Seals tackled running back Lamont Warren for a loss on third down and one. On the next play, Cary Blanchard hit the right upright on his 34-yard field goal, but it still bounced in and the Colts took a 3–0 lead. After each team punted, Pittsburgh's Norm Johnson kicked a field goal to even the game with under two minutes remaining in the first quarter. The field goal occurred after Kordell Stewart dropped a pass in the end zone. Replays showed Colts safety Jason Belser made contact with Stewart just before the ball arrived, but no penalty flag was thrown.

In the second quarter, a 30-yard reception by Colts receiver Sean Dawkins set up Blanchard's second field goal. But later on, Pittsburgh drove 80 yards in 17 plays, featuring three third down conversion runs by Kordell Stewart, and scored on O'Donnell's 5-yard third and goal touchdown pass to Stewart with 13 seconds left in the half, making the score 10–6. Replays showed Stewart had put half a foot out of bounds before making the catch, which would have made him an ineligible receiver, but the penalty was not called. As it was during the seven-year period when the NFL did not implement instant replay, the play could not be challenged and reversed.

On Indianapolis' first drive of the second half, they drove 61 yards in nine plays, featuring a 29-yard completion from Jim Harbaugh to tight end Ken Dilger. Blanchard finished the drive with his third field goal to cut their deficit to 10–9. Then after forcing a three and punt, Indy drove 35 yards in nine plays to set up another field goal try, which would have put the Colts up 12–10. But this time Blanchard's 47-yard attempt sailed wide right. Taking over on their own 37, Pittsburgh mounted a drive in Colts territory where Johnson's 37-yard field goal put them back up by four points, at 13–9.

Early in the fourth quarter, a long punt return by Steelers receiver Andre Hastings gave them the ball at midfield. But all they got out of their great field position was a missed field goal. After that, Harbaugh threw a 47-yard touchdown pass to wide receiver Floyd Turner to take the lead, 16–13. After a Steelers punt, their defense got a big chance when Warren fumbled deep in Colts territory, but guard Joe Staysniak recovered the ball in mid-air to keep the drive going. Later on, defensive back Willie Williams tackled Warren behind the line on third down and one to force a punt, giving Pittsburgh the ball back with 3:03 left in the game.

Pittsburgh then marched 67 yards to score the winning touchdown. Running back Byron Bam Morris scored the game-winning 1-yard touchdown run with 1:34 remaining in the game to pull Pittsburgh ahead for good. The drive was aided by O'Donnell's 9-yard completion to Hastings on fourth down and 3 from the 47-yard line, as well as an earlier dropped potential interception that went in and out of the arms of linebacker Quentin Coryatt. On the next play after Hastings' fourth down conversion catch, O'Donnell completed a 37-yard pass to Ernie Mills on the Indianapolis 1-yard line, setting up Morris' 1-yard scoring run. The Colts got the ball back and advanced to the Steelers' 29 with 5 seconds left, narrowly avoiding a turnover when defensive back Chris Oldham dropped a wide open interception.

On the game's final play, Harbaugh threw a high, lofting pass toward the end zone. The ball was deflected by several players on both sides before hitting Colts receiver Aaron Bailey in the chest. As Bailey was landing after his leaping attempt to catch it, he had a second chance as the ball landed in his midsection. Bailey tried to close his hands around the ball, as he had the first time, but could not haul it in. Bailey did eventually emerge from the ground with the ball in his possession, but the officials ruled the pass incomplete as, just before Bailey secured the ball, it had bounced off of the turf after being deflected by a Steeler defensive back. The game was over and the Steelers advanced to their first Super Bowl in sixteen years.

Harbaugh completed 21 of 33 passes for 267 yards and a touchdown.

== Aftermath ==
The missed call on Kordell Stewart's touchdown catch in the second quarter brought some debate following the game on whether or not the league should bring back instant replay, which had been repealed in 1992 after being used since 1986. Replays at the time demonstrated that there would have been enough evidence to reverse the call and penalize Stewart for an illegal touching foul (stepping out of bounds before catching the pass). Jim Harbaugh later stated in postgame interviews that the missed call on Stewart and the missed pass interference call on Jason Belser that could have led to a Pittsburgh touchdown instead of a field goal were a "wash". Despite this game, there was no real desire by league owners to reinstate instant replay for 1996. A different instant replay system than the original eventually returned for the 1999 NFL season, and has since been made a permanent addition of the NFL rules.

The game marked the only home AFC Championship Game in Bill Cowher's 15-year tenure that the Steelers won, having advanced to the game at home in 1994, 1995, 1997, 2001, and 2004. Except for this game mentioned—which the Steelers narrowly won—the other home matchups were losses. The only time the team played for the AFC title on the road during Cowher's tenure, the 2005 matchup against the Denver Broncos at Invesco Field at Mile High, was the only AFC Championship Game the Steelers won decisively during Cowher's tenure, winning 34–17. It was also the only year in which the Steelers won the Super Bowl with Cowher as their head coach, defeating the Seattle Seahawks in Super Bowl XL 21–10.

The game was the last for Ted Marchibroda in his second stint as the Colts head coach, having coached the Colts from 1975 to 1979 when the team was in Baltimore. Following the Cleveland Browns relocation controversy, the newly christened Baltimore Ravens hired Marchibroda to be their inaugural head coach. Following him to Baltimore was ex-Colts Floyd Turner (whose number 88 in Indianapolis was immediately picked up by Marvin Harrison, who spent the next 13 years with the Colts) and former University of Pittsburgh standout Tony Siragusa; Siragusa later picked up a Super Bowl ring when the Ravens won Super Bowl XXXV. Marchibroda was fired after the 1998 season and returned to the Colts as a color commentator for their radio network until retiring following the Colts victory in Super Bowl XLI at the end of the 2006 NFL season, after which he became a pre-game commentator for the Colts for a time before Marchibroda's death in January 2016. A native of Franklin, Pennsylvania north of Pittsburgh, Marchibroda's last game as Colts head coach actually came in his hometown, with Marchibroda having played quarterback for the Steelers in the 1950s.

The Steelers played the Dallas Cowboys two weeks later in Super Bowl XXX, renewing the rivalry the two teams had in the 1970s, when the two teams were among the most dominant teams in the NFL. The heavily favored Cowboys defeated the Steelers 27–17 to give the latter team their first Super Bowl defeat.

The Colts and Steelers both made the playoffs in 1996, with the Steelers defeating the Colts 42–14 in the wild-card round. The following year, the two teams met for the fourth consecutive year in Pittsburgh in Week 7, in which the Steelers defeated the struggling Colts 24–22, dropping the Colts to 0–6 en route to a 3–13 season and the team drafting Peyton Manning first overall in the 1998 NFL draft. The four consecutive losses in Pittsburgh formed part of a longer losing streak for the Colts, who after defeating the Steelers 41–7 at Pitt Stadium in 1968 lost 12 straight games against the Steelers in Pittsburgh before breaking through with a 24–20 win at Heinz Field in 2008; the 2008 win is also the last victory for the Colts against the Steelers in any capacity as of 2023, as the Steelers currently have an eight-game winning streak against the Colts both home and away. The Colts finished 0–11 lifetime at Three Rivers Stadium.

Jim Harbaugh, who after retiring worked his way up to being an NFL head coach himself with the San Francisco 49ers, has stated that the 1995 AFC Championship Game continues to haunt him: "Coming that close to your dream of participating in the Super Bowl, and then seeing it brush by your face in an instant, and you walk off the field and you go 'there will be other days'. And then you realize it was the only day." Harbaugh eventually reached the Super Bowl with the 49ers, only to lose Super Bowl XLVII to the Baltimore Ravens, coached by his brother John Harbaugh.

The game itself was not viewable to many residents in the Pittsburgh suburb of Monroeville, Pennsylvania due to a power outage from Time Warner Cable, angering many residents. Time Warner, which was already in a dispute with the municipality over carriage fees, eventually traded its Monroeville systems to Comcast as part of their joint acquisition of the assets of Adelphia Communications in 2006.

== Officials ==
- Referee: Bernie Kukar (#86)
- Umpire: Hendi Ancich (#115)
- Head linesman: Earnie Frantz (#111)
- Line judge: Ron Baynes (#56)
- Back judge: Tim Millis (#80)
- Side judge: Doug Toole (#4)
- Field judge: John Robison (#46)

== See also ==
- 2005 AFC Divisional playoff game (Pittsburgh–Indianapolis)
- List of Hail Mary passes in American football
