= Zack Crockett =

American football player (born 1972)

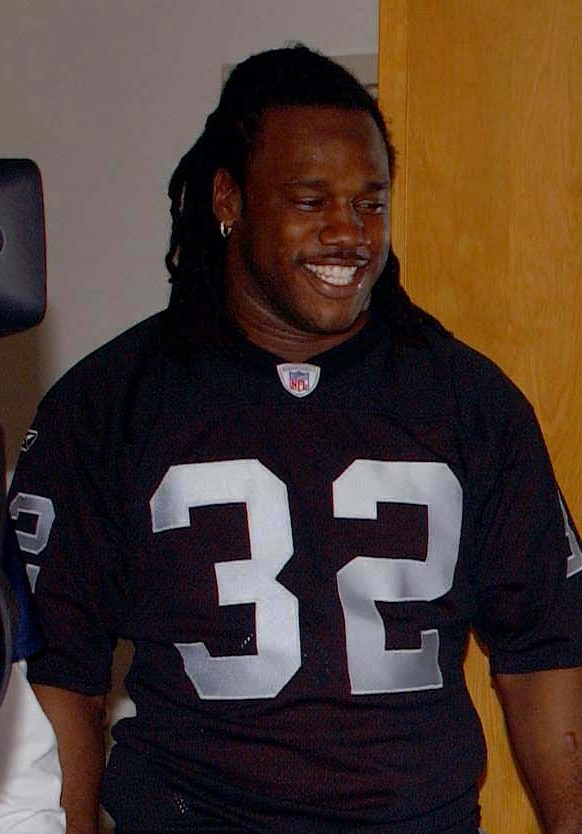
- Crockett in 2005

No. 32, 34, 30
- Position: Fullback

Personal information
- Born: December 2, 1972 (age 53); Pompano Beach, Florida, U.S.
- Listed height: 6 ft 2 in (1.88 m)
- Listed weight: 240 lb (109 kg)

Career information
- High school: Blanche Ely (Pompano Beach)
- College: Florida State
- NFL draft: 1995: 3rd round, 79th overall pick

Career history
- Indianapolis Colts (1995–1998); Jacksonville Jaguars (1998); Oakland Raiders (1999–2006); Tampa Bay Buccaneers (2007); Dallas Cowboys (2007)

Awards and highlights
- National champion (1993)

Career NFL statistics
- Rushing yards: 1,701
- Rushing average: 3.3
- Rushing touchdowns: 36
- Receptions: 96
- Receiving yards: 680
- Receiving touchdowns: 2
- Stats at Pro Football Reference

Zachary Theopolis Crockett (born December 2, 1972) is an American former professional football player who was a fullback in the National Football League (NFL). He played college football for the Florida State Seminoles and was selected by the Indianapolis Colts in the third round of the 1995 NFL draft. After his playing career, he became an NFL scout.

== Early life ==
Crockett attended Blanche Ely High School in Pompano Beach, Florida and was a letterman in football. In football, he garnered All-District and All-State honors.

== Professional career ==
Pre-draft measurables
Height	Weight	Arm length	Hand span	Bench press
6 ft 1 5/8 in (1.87 m)	244 lb (111 kg)	31 7/8 in (0.81 m)	10 7/8 in (0.28 m)	20 reps

Crockett played three seasons with the Colts, (1995–1997). During his rookie year he only recorded one rushing attempt during 16 games during the regular season. Perhaps one of his finer professional career moments came during the 1995 AFC Wildcard game, where he started in place of an injured Marshall Faulk. During this game against the San Diego Chargers, Crockett rushed for 147 yards and scored 2 touchdowns to help the Colts win their first playoff game in 24 years. During his final two seasons with the Colts, Crockett started 16 of 21 games played, accumulating a total of just 464 yards on 126 carries (3.64 YPC) and one touchdown.

After being released by the Colts, Crockett played for the Jacksonville Jaguars in 1998 playing in 12 games, and starting two of them. The next year, he was a free agent and found his home, with the Oakland Raiders. In 2001, he led the Raiders in regular season rushing touchdowns, with six. In 2002, he surpassed Jon Ritchie and became Oakland's full time starter. That postseason, Crockett, by then regarded as a “short-yardage specialist”, scored a touchdown during a 30–10 win over the New York Jets in the divisional round. In 2003, he led the Raiders with eight rushing touchdowns.

On September 1, 2007, the Raiders released him. On October 10, 2007, signed with the Tampa Bay Buccaneers and on October 23, 2007, they released him. He was re-signed on December 12 and was released again on December 19. He was claimed off waivers by the Dallas Cowboys on the same day. After practicing some with the Cowboys and being inactive for his first game with them, he was cut on December 24, 2007.

== NFL career statistics ==
Legend
	Led the league
**Bold**	Career high

=== Regular season ===
Year	Team	Games		Rushing					Receiving				
Year	Team	GP	GS	Att	Yds	Avg	Lng	TD	Rec	Yds	Avg	Lng	TD
1995	IND	16	0	1	0	0.0	0	0	2	35	**17.5**	19	0
1996	IND	5	5	31	164	**5.3**	25	0	11	96	8.7	**32**	**1**
1997	IND	16	11	**95**	**300**	3.2	20	1	15	**112**	7.5	19	0
1998	IND	2	1	2	5	2.5	5	0	1	1	1.0	1	0
1998	JAX	10	1	0	0	0.0	0	0	1	4	4.0	4	0
1999	OAK	13	1	45	91	2.0	7	4	8	56	7.0	12	**1**
2000	OAK	16	4	43	130	3.0	11	7	10	62	6.2	15	0
2001	OAK	16	0	57	145	2.5	10	6	2	10	5.0	8	0
2002	OAK	16	0	40	118	3.0	33	**8**	0	0	0.0	0	0
2003	OAK	16	7	48	145	3.0	44	7	7	53	7.6	16	0
2004	OAK	16	9	48	232	4.8	**47**	2	**16**	87	5.4	11	0
2005	OAK	16	10	60	208	3.5	24	1	13	111	8.5	23	0
2006	OAK	16	9	39	163	4.2	17	0	10	53	5.3	14	0
2007	TAM	1	0	1	0	0.0	0	0	0	0	0.0	0	0
		175	58	510	1,701	3.3	47	36	96	680	7.1	32	2

=== Playoffs ===
Year	Team	Games		Rushing					Receiving				
Year	Team	GP	GS	Att	Yds	Avg	Lng	TD	Rec	Yds	Avg	Lng	TD
1995	IND	3	2	**20**	**161**	**8.1**	**66**	**2**	**6**	**37**	**6.2**	**12**	0
1998	JAX	2	0	0	0	0.0	0	0	0	0	0.0	0	0
2000	OAK	2	2	1	3	3.0	3	0	3	18	6.0	9	0
2001	OAK	2	0	5	8	1.6	3	1	0	0	0.0	0	0
2002	OAK	3	0	5	20	4.0	7	**2**	0	0	0.0	0	0
		12	4	31	192	6.2	66	5	9	55	6.1	12	0

== Personal life ==
His brother, Henri Crockett, was also an American football player, who played for the Atlanta Falcons (1997–2001) and the Minnesota Vikings (2002–2003).

In cooking, Crockett is regarded as a "gourmet chef" and his chosen favorite dish to prepare for family is Peking Duck and Lamb Chops. He has statesd that his favorite film is Pulp Fiction. He stated also enjoys travelling the world to different resorts and learning different cultures. He states that being an avid traveler and finally relaxing is something he is looking to do in the future.

He is a member of Omega Psi Phi fraternity.
