= Ellis Johnson (defensive lineman) =

American football player (born 1973)

No. 62, 61
- Positions: Defensive tackle, defensive end

Personal information
- Born: October 30, 1973 (age 53); Wildwood, Florida, U.S.
- Listed height: 6 ft 2 in (1.88 m)
- Listed weight: 288 lb (131 kg)

Career information
- High school: Wildwood (FL)
- College: Florida
- NFL draft: 1995: 1st round, 15th overall pick

Career history
- Indianapolis Colts (1995–2001); Atlanta Falcons (2002–2003); Denver Broncos (2004)

Awards and highlights
- First-team All-American (1994); First-team All-SEC (1994); CNN Defensive Player of the Year (1994); University of Florida Athletic Hall of Fame

Career NFL statistics
- Games played: 149
- Games started: 89
- Tackles: 356
- Sacks: 51
- Interceptions: 3
- Stats at Pro Football Reference

Ellis Bernard Johnson (born October 30, 1973) is an American former professional football player who was a defensive tackle in the National Football League (NFL) for ten seasons during the 1990s and 2000s. Johnson played college football for the University of Florida, and was recognized as the National Defensive Player of the Year. He was selected in the first round of the 1995 NFL draft, and played professionally for the Indianapolis Colts, Atlanta Falcons and Denver Broncos of the NFL.

== Early life ==
Johnson was born in Wildwood, Florida in 1973. He attended Wildwood High School, where he played high school football for the Wildwood Wildcats.

== College career ==
Johnson accepted an athletic scholarship to attend the University of Florida in Gainesville, Florida, where he played for coach Steve Spurrier's Florida Gators football team from 1991 to 1994. As a senior team captain on the Gators' 1994 Southeastern Conference (SEC) championship team, Johnson was a first-team All-SEC selection, an honorable mention All-American, and CNN's National Defensive Player of the Year; he was also selected by his Gators teammates as the team's most valuable player. He finished his four years as a Gator with 16.3 quarterback sacks and 26.8 tackles for a loss.

In a retrospective series published by The Gainesville Sun in 2006, Johnson was rated No. 32 among the top 100 Gators of the first 100 seasons of Florida football. He was inducted into the University of Florida Athletic Hall of Fame as a "Gator Great" in 2007.

== Professional career ==
=== Indianapolis Colts ===
The Indianapolis Colts selected Johnson in the first round (fifteenth pick overall) of the 1995 NFL Draft. He played for the Colts from 1995 to 2001. During those seven seasons, he started eighty-four of 104 games, recording 269 tackles, thirty-three quarterback sacks and two interceptions.

=== Atlanta Falcons ===
Johnson signed with the Atlanta Falcons before the 2002 season, and he played for the Falcons from 2002 to 2003. In the two years, he started five of thirty-two games, recording sixty-seven tackles, and fifteen sacks.

=== Denver Broncos ===
Johnson was traded by the Falcons to the Denver Broncos before the 2004 season in exchange for the Broncos' fifth-round selection in the 2005 NFL draft. In his only season with the Broncos, he played in thirteen games, recording sixteen tackles, three sacks and an interception. The interception came on a deflected pass in the famous "snow game" with the Oakland Raiders, and Johnson put on an impressive burst of speed to reach the end zone.

== NFL career statistics ==
Legend
**Bold**	Career high

=== Regular season ===
Year	Team	Games		Tackles					Interceptions					Fumbles			
Year	Team	GP	GS	Cmb	Solo	Ast	Sck	TFL	Int	Yds	TD	Lng	PD	FF	FR	Yds	TD
1995	IND	**16**	2	18	15	3	4.5	-	-	-	0	-	-	0	0	0	0
1996	IND	12	6	22	14	8	0.0	-	-	-	0	-	-	0	0	0	0
1997	IND	15	15	**56**	**38**	**18**	4.5	-	**1**	18	0	18	-	**1**	**2**	0	0
1998	IND	**16**	**16**	55	**38**	17	**8.0**	-	-	-	0	-	-	**1**	0	0	0
1999	IND	**16**	**16**	45	34	11	7.5	**10**	0	0	0	0	**4**	0	1	0	0
2000	IND	13	13	40	29	11	5.0	6	**1**	-1	0	-1	3	**1**	0	0	0
2001	IND	**16**	**16**	34	20	14	3.5	4	0	0	0	0	**4**	**1**	0	0	0
2002	ATL	**16**	2	29	25	4	7.0	8	0	0	0	0	3	0	0	0	0
2003	ATL	**16**	3	42	34	8	**8.0**	8	0	0	0	0	1	**1**	1	**4**	0
2004	DEN	13	0	16	15	1	3.0	5	**1**	**32**	**1**	**32**	1	0	0	0	0
Career		149	89	357	262	95	51.0	41	3	49	1	32	16	5	4	4	0

=== Playoffs ===
Year	Team	Games		Tackles					Interceptions					Fumbles			
Year	Team	GP	GS	Cmb	Solo	Ast	Sck	TFL	Int	Yds	TD	Lng	PD	FF	FR	Yds	TD
1995	IND	**3**	**1**	2	2	0	0.0	-	-	-	-	-	-	0	0	0	0
1996	IND	1	0	**6**	**6**	0	0.0	-	-	-	-	-	-	0	0	0	0
1999	IND	1	**1**	4	1	**3**	0.0	0	-	-	-	-	-	0	0	0	0
2000	IND	1	**1**	3	1	2	**1.0**	0	-	-	-	-	-	0	0	0	0
2002	ATL	2	0	2	1	1	0.0	**1**	-	-	-	-	-	0	0	0	0
2004	DEN	1	0	1	1	0	0.0	**1**	-	-	-	-	-	0	0	0	0
Career		9	3	18	12	6	1.0	2	-	-	-	-	-	0	0	0	0

== See also ==
- 1994 College Football All-America Team
- History of the Indianapolis Colts
- List of Florida Gators football All-Americans
- List of Florida Gators in the NFL draft
- List of University of Florida Athletic Hall of Fame members
- List of Indianapolis Colts first-round draft picks
