= Ken Dilger =

American football player (born 1971)

No. 85
- Position: Tight end

Personal information
- Born: February 2, 1971 (age 55); Mariah Hill, Indiana, U.S.
- Listed height: 6 ft 5 in (1.96 m)
- Listed weight: 250 lb (113 kg)

Career information
- High school: Heritage Hills (Lincoln City, Indiana)
- College: Illinois
- NFL draft: 1995: 2nd round, 48th overall pick

Career history
- Indianapolis Colts (1995–2001); Tampa Bay Buccaneers (2002–2004)

Awards and highlights
- Super Bowl champion (XXXVII); Pro Bowl (2001); PFWA All-Rookie Team (1995); Shrine Bowl (1995); Second-team All-Big Ten (1994); Liberty Bowl champion (1994); Indiana Football Hall of Fame (2022)

Career NFL statistics
- Receptions: 356
- Receiving yards: 4,099
- Receiving touchdowns: 24
- Stats at Pro Football Reference

Kenneth Ray Dilger (born February 2, 1971) is an American former professional football player who was a tight end in the National Football League (NFL) for the Indianapolis Colts and Tampa Bay Buccaneers. Dilger played college football for the Illinois Fighting Illini.

== Early life ==
Ken Dilger was raised in Mariah Hill in Spencer County, Indiana. He attended Heritage Hills High School in Lincoln City, Indiana, where he played quarterback on the football team. As a senior, Dilger threw for a school-record 2,005 yards and 23 touchdowns. Dilger totaled 3,750 passing yards in his high school career. He also starred in basketball and baseball.

== College career ==
Dilger was recruited by the University of Illinois Urbana-Champaign, where he joined the football team in 1990 as a quarterback. He redshirted his freshman year. During spring practice for the 1991 season, Dilger transitioned to tight end at the request of offensive coordinator Gene Dahlquist. He climbed the team hierarchy rapidly and secured the starting tight end position before the season began.

As a redshirt freshman in 1991, Dilger caught 18 passes for 212 yards and one touchdown. His 212 receiving yards set a freshman record for Illinois. In the second game of the season against Missouri, Dilger dropped a late pass in the endzone from quarterback Jason Verduzco that could have won the game, but the Illini lost 19–23. He redeemed himself throughout the season, with his best performance of the year coming in a 21–24 loss against Iowa, where he had five receptions for 77 yards. The Illini were ranked as high as #13 in the AP poll during the season, and played in the 1991 John Hancock Bowl, but lost 3–6 in a defensive struggle against UCLA. They finished the year at 6–6, with defensive coordinator Lou Tepper replacing John Mackovic at head coach prior to the bowl game.

In the lead-up to the 1992 season, Dilger tore cartilage in his right knee in late-August and underwent arthroscopic knee surgery. While preparing to return to the lineup, Dilger tore cartilage in his left knee, which was also surgically repaired on September 28, 1992. After missing the first five games of the season, Dilger returned in a 14–24 loss to Iowa, where he caught one pass for six yards. Dilger recorded six catches on the season for 42 yards before breaking his left wrist during practice prior to the 1992 Holiday Bowl, which ended his season.

In his redshirt junior year, Dilger battled for the starting tight end spot with senior David Olson. Dilger won out, and featured in all 11 games for the Illini. Dilger's first touchdown reception of the season came on a 17-yard pass from quarterback Johnny Johnson as the Illini upset #13-ranked Michigan, 24–21, on October 23, 1993. Dilger followed up with a 26-yard TD reception the next week in a 20–13 win over Northwestern. Dilger had 17 receptions for 212 yards and two touchdowns on the year, as the Illini finished with a 5–6 record.

Dilger's 1994 redshirt senior season was the best of his college career. Despite suffering a hamstring injury in the opening game of the season against Washington State, Dilger finished the year as the Illini's second leading receiver and tied for most receiving touchdowns. In the third game of the season against Northern Illinois, Dilger led the Illini in receiving with five receptions for 78 yards. Against #17 Ohio State two weeks later, Dilger scored the deciding touchdown in a 24–10 upset victory. Illinois finished the year with a 30–0 shutout win against East Carolina in the 1994 Liberty Bowl. Dilger recorded a 17-yard touchdown reception in the game, totaling seven catches for 60 yards. Dilger finished the year with 48 receptions for 607 yards and six touchdowns and was named to the 1994 All-Big Ten Second-Team.

== Professional career ==
Pre-draft measurables
Height	Weight	Arm length	Hand span	40-yard dash	20-yard shuttle	Vertical jump	Broad jump	Bench press
6 ft 4 7/8 in (1.95 m)	252 lb (114 kg)	33 1/4 in (0.84 m)	10 1/8 in (0.26 m)	4.80 s	4.19 s	33.5 in (0.85 m)	9 ft 4 in (2.84 m)	17 reps
All values from NFL Combine

Dilger was projected as a middle-round pick in the 1995 NFL draft, and was ranked as the ninth overall tight end by USA Today. He also displayed versatility as a long snapper at the 1995 NFL Combine, despite never serving as a long snapper in a collegiate game.

=== Indianapolis Colts (1995–2001) ===
The Indianapolis Colts selected Dilger in the second round (48th overall pick) of the 1995 NFL draft. Dilger signed a reported five-year contract with the Colts on July 15, 1995, and he joined the team in training camp at Anderson University in Anderson, Indiana. Dilger started the season as the backup tight end behind Charles Arbuckle, but Arbuckle was waived during the Colts bye week leading to Dilger taking over the starting role in week five. Dilger's breakout game as a rookie came in the Colts' week-six comeback victory in overtime against the previously undefeated Miami Dolphins, where he recorded four catches for 92 yards. His first NFL touchdown came the following week as the Colts upset the defending Super Bowl champion San Francisco 49ers, 18–17. Dilger recorded seven receptions for 125 yards and one touchdown, forming a partnership with quarterback Jim Harbaugh. Dilger proved to be a regular contributor throughout his rookie year, and finished the regular season with 42 receptions, a career-high 635 receiving yards, and four touchdowns. He was named to the 1995 PFWA NFL All-Rookie Team.

The Colts made the 1995-96 NFL playoffs, their first playoff appearance since 1987. Dilger scored a touchdown in the Colts' Wild Card game against the San Diego Chargers. After beating the Kansas City Chiefs in a frigid game, the Colts made it to the 1995 AFC Championship Game, facing off against the Pittsburgh Steelers. The Colts lost after a last-second throw to Aaron Bailey fell incomplete in the end zone. Dilger had one reception for 30 yards in the AFC Championship Game.

In 1996, Dilger built upon his success as a rookie as the full-time starting tight end. In a week-two 21–7 victory against the New York Jets, Dilger set a franchise record for tight end receiving yards in a game when he recorded seven receptions for 156 yards and one touchdown. Dilger's targets dropped as rookie wide receiver Marvin Harrison became the Colts primary pass catcher. Despite a sluggish end of the season, Dilger finished the year with 42 receptions for 503 yards and tied his career-high of four touchdown receptions. The Colts made the 1996-97 NFL playoffs, losing in the Wild Card round to the Steelers.

Dilger's 1997 season started slow, complicated by a hamstring injury that caused him to miss two games in weeks six and seven. The Colts offense faltered in 1997, and with a young offensive line, Dilger was tasked with blocking more than pass catching. Despite his new role, Dilger still served as a pass catcher when needed. In a week-16 rout of the Dolphins, Dilger recorded five catches for 100 yards and three touchdowns. He finished the 1997 season with 27 receptions, 380 receiving yards, and three touchdowns, as the Colts went 3–13 on the year.

The 1998 season brought many changes to the Colts. The Colts had a new quarterback in first-overall draft pick Peyton Manning, new head coach Jim Mora, and new offensive coordinator Tom Moore. The Colts employed a two tight end formation, where Dilger shared starting duties with Marcus Pollard. Pollard's emergence, coupled with a sputtering Colts offense, meant limited productivity for Dilger. His first scoring play of the season was on a trick-play extra point, where long snapper Bradford Banta made a direct snap to Dilger who ran it in for a two-point conversion. Dilger's lone touchdown on the season came in a week-nine loss to the Miami Dolphins. He finished the season with 31 receptions for 303 yards and one touchdown.

In 1999, Dilger continued to split time with Pollard. Dilger was continued to serve as the pass-blocking tight end while Pollard established his pass catching capabilities. The emergence of rookie running back Edgerrin James also led to more run blocking scenarios. The Colts offense found their rhythm throughout the 1999 season, and Dilger's productivity rose from the previous season. He finished the 1999 season with 40 catches for 479 yards and two touchdowns. The Colts had a historic turn around from the previous season, going 13–3 and winning their division. In the 1999-00 NFL playoffs, they lost in the Divisional Round to the Tennessee Titans. Dilger had two receptions for 12 yards in the 16–19 loss.

On February 10, 2000, Dilger re-signed with the Colts on a five-year, $15 million contract that included a $4.5 million signing bonus. The Colts planned to use the franchise tag on Dilger had he not signed a new contract. Dilger expressed excitement in the new contract, stating that he was looking forward to ending his career with the Colts. Dilger had become an important part of the Colts diverse offensive attack, whether it was through blocking, pass-catching, or lining up in the backfield as an H-back.

Dilger remained consistent in the 2000 season. In a week-two loss to the Oakland Raiders, Dilger recorded eight receptions for 96 yards. The following week, he had five receptions for 38 yards and one touchdown in a 43–14 win over the Jacksonville Jaguars. In week six, Dilger had six catches for 93 yards and one touchdown against the Seattle Seahawks. He finished the 2000 regular season with a career-high 47 receptions, 538 yards, and three touchdowns. The Colts made the 2000-01 NFL playoffs, losing in overtime to the Miami Dolphins. Dilger recorded three catches for 16 yards in the loss 17–23 loss.

Dilger's 2001 season was less productive statistically than prior years. He started the season slow, averaging only 25 receiving yards in the first six games. In weeks seven and eight Dilger did not have a reception. His lone touchdown reception came in a win against the Atlanta Falcons in week 14 when Dilger leapt over two defenders on the way to the end zone. The following week, Dilger threw a 39-yard touchdown pass to Marvin Harrison after receiving a backfield throw from Manning. The Colts finished the year at 6–10, and Dilger had 32 catches for 343 yards and one touchdown. Dilger played through a knee injury throughout the year, and planned to have surgery after the regular season. However, Dilger was named to the 2001 Pro Bowl as an alternate due to other players' injuries and delayed his surgery until after the game.

In January 2002, Dilger was included in the Colts list of players available in the 2002 NFL expansion draft for the newly created Houston Texans. Dilger was not selected by the Texans. The Colts subsequently released Dilger on February 21, 2002, along with cornerback Jeff Burris, safety Chad Cota, and defensive tackle Mike Wells to clear salary cap space.

=== Tampa Bay Buccaneers (2002–2004) ===
After declining offers from the Seattle Seahawks, Dallas Cowboys, and Chicago Bears, Dilger signed a three-year, $3.34 million contract, including an $800,000 signing bonus, with the Tampa Bay Buccaneers on April 17, 2002.

Dilger provided a veteran presence for newly hired head coach Jon Gruden, who brought in Dilger both for his pass-catching ability but also to bolster the Buccaneers' run-blocking. Despite battling injuries throughout the year, Dilger appeared in all 16 games, with 34 receptions for 329 yards and two touchdowns on the year. The Buccaneers went 12-4 and won the newly-formed NFC South division. Dilger and the Bucs beat the San Francisco 49ers in the Divisional round of the 2002-03 NFL playoffs, where Dilger recorded three catches for 35 yards. In the 2002 NFC Championship Game against the Philadelphia Eagles, Dilger had three receptions for 41 yards as the Bucs won 27–10. Dilger then had one catch for 12 yards in Super Bowl XXXVII, where Tampa Bay defeated the Oakland Raiders 48–21.

In 2003, Dilger and the Buccaneers looked to build on their success of the previous year. In week five, Dilger made his first return to Indianapolis since being released by the Colts. Dilger and the Buccaneers lost 35–38 in overtime in a game where the Bucs were leading 35–14 with less than 10 minutes remaining in the fourth quarter. Dilger had six receptions for 63 yards in the game. Dilger was involved with a strange play when he was the target of a Brad Johnson throw in the first quarter that was intercepted by Colts safety Mike Doss. Doss then fumbled the ball while being tackled by Buccaneers' center John Wade. The fumble was recovered by Buccaneers' wide receiver Keenan McCardell and returned for a 57-yard touchdown. Dilger suffered several injury setbacks throughout the year and finished with 22 catches for 244 yards and one touchdown.

The Buccaneers started 0–4 in the 2004 season and Dilger saw limited offensive production during that span. In the team's first win against the New Orleans Saints, Dilger had three catches for 60 yards, including a 45-yard touchdown reception from quarterback Brian Griese. Dilger had five games of at least four receptions on the year as he saw more action as a pass-catcher. Despite the Buccaneers finishing the year at 5–11, Dilger had 39 receptions for 345 yards and three touchdowns.

Dilger finished his career with regular season totals of 356 receptions, 4,099 receiving yards (11.5 average per reception), and 24 touchdowns.

== Career statistics ==
=== NFL ===
Legend
	Won the Super Bowl
**Bold**	Career high

==== Regular season ====
Year	Team	Games		Receiving			
Year	Team	GP	GS	Rec	Yds	Avg	TD
1995	IND	16	13	42	**635**	**15.1**	**4**
1996	IND	16	16	42	503	12.0	**4**
1997	IND	14	14	27	380	14.1	3
1998	IND	16	16	31	303	9.8	1
1999	IND	15	15	40	479	12.0	2
2000	IND	16	16	**47**	538	11.4	3
2001	IND	16	16	32	343	10.7	1
2002	TB	16	15	34	329	9.7	2
2003	TB	15	15	22	244	11.1	1
2004	TB	16	14	39	345	8.8	3
Career		156	150	356	4,099	11.5	24

==== Playoffs ====
Year	Team	Games		Receiving			
Year	Team	GP	GS	Rec	Yds	Avg	TD
1995	IND	3	3	3	39	**13.0**	**1**
1996	IND	1	1	1	4	4.0	0
1999	IND	1	1	2	12	6.0	0
2000	IND	1	1	3	16	5.3	0
2002	TB	3	3	**7**	**88**	12.6	0
Career		9	9	16	159	9.9	1

=== College ===
Season	Team	GP	Receiving			
Season	Team	GP	Rec	Yds	Avg	TD
1991	Illinois	11	18	212	11.8	1
1992	Illinois	6	6	42	7.0	0
1993	Illinois	11	17	212	12.5	2
1994	Illinois	11	48	607	12.6	6
Career		39	89	1,073	12.1	9

== Personal life ==
Dilger graduated from the University of Illinois with a degree in marketing.

After retiring as a player, Dilger served as an analyst for Indianapolis television station WISH-TV for 14 years, providing Colts pre-game coverage.

Dilger and his wife Heidi have two children. The couple founded the Dilger Foundation in Indianapolis, and from 1995 to 2005 they helped raise money for local children's charities. They also founded a banana bread business.

Dilger was inducted into the Indiana Football Hall of Fame in 2022.
