= Conrad Clarks =

American football player (born 1969)

No. 35
- Position: Defensive back

Personal information
- Born: April 21, 1969 (age 57); Franklin, Louisiana, U.S.
- Listed height: 5 ft 10 in (1.78 m)
- Listed weight: 200 lb (91 kg)

Career information
- High school: Franklin
- College: Northeast Louisiana
- NFL draft: 1995: undrafted

Career history
- Indianapolis Colts (1995)
- Stats at Pro Football Reference

Conrad G. Clarks (born April 21, 1969) is an American former professional football player who was a defensive back for one season with the Indianapolis Colts of the National Football League (NFL). He played college football at Pearl River Community College and Northeast Louisiana.

== Early life and college ==
Conrad G. Clarks was born on April 21, 1969, in Franklin, Louisiana, and attended Franklin High School there. He graduated from Franklin High in 1990.

Clarks played college football at Pearl River Community College from 1991 to 1992, and earned first-team all-state honors. He then lettered for the Northeast Louisiana Indians of Northeast Louisiana University from 1993 to 1994. He was hampered by an injured quad muscle for six games his senior year and also missed one game due to the injury. He had 25 solo tackles during one game his senior year. Clarks earned first-team all-independent honors for his performance during the 1994 season.

== Professional career ==
Clarks was rated the No. 7 safety in the 1995 NFL draft by USA Today. After going undrafted, Clarks signed with the Indianapolis Colts on April 27 as a 26-year-old rookie. He had also received interest from the Jacksonville Jaguars and New York Giants. Clarks played in six games for the Colts during the 1995 season, and was listed as a safety. He also appeared in three playoff games that year. Clarks was released on July 16, 1996.
