= Steve Hall (American football) =

American football player (born 1973)

No. 35, 23
- Position: Cornerback

Personal information
- Born: April 15, 1973; Fort Wayne, Indiana, U.S.
- Died: December 21, 2022; Terre Haute, Indiana, U.S.
- Listed height: 6 ft 0 in (1.83 m)
- Listed weight: 209 lb (95 kg)

Career information
- High school: New Haven (IN)
- College: Kentucky

Career history
- Indianapolis Colts (1996)*; Minnesota Vikings (1996); Indianapolis Colts (1996); Minnesota Vikings (1997)*
- * Offseason or practice squad member only

Career statistics
- Games played: 3
- Stats at Pro Football Reference

Steven Lamont Hall (born April 15, 1973) was an American former professional football cornerback who played one season in the National Football League (NFL) for the Indianapolis Colts and the Minnesota Vikings. He went to college at Kentucky.
