= Kendel Shello =

American football player (born 1973)

No. 97
- Position: Defensive end

Personal information
- Born: November 24, 1973 (age 52); New Iberia, Louisiana, U.S.
- Listed height: 6 ft 3 in (1.91 m)
- Listed weight: 301 lb (137 kg)

Career information
- High school: New Iberia
- College: Southern
- NFL draft: 1996: undrafted

Career history
- Indianapolis Colts (1996–1998); Oakland Raiders (1999)*; San Diego Chargers (1999)*
- * Offseason or practice squad member only

Career NFL statistics
- Tackles: 10
- Sacks: 2
- Fumble recoveries: 1
- Stats at Pro Football Reference

Kendel Shello (born November 24, 1973) is an American former professional football player who was a defensive end for the Indianapolis Colts of the National Football League (NFL) from 1996 to 1998. He played college football for the Southern Jaguars.
