= Floyd Turner =

American football player (born 1966)

No. 88, 85, 87
- Position: Wide receiver

Personal information
- Born: May 29, 1966 (age 60); Shreveport, Louisiana, U.S.
- Listed height: 5 ft 11 in (1.80 m)
- Listed weight: 199 lb (90 kg)

Career information
- High school: Mansfield (LA)
- College: Northwestern State
- NFL draft: 1989: 6th round, 159th overall pick

Career history
- New Orleans Saints (1989–1993); Indianapolis Colts (1994–1995); Baltimore Ravens (1996–1998)

Career NFL statistics
- Receptions: 281
- Receiving yards: 3,805
- Receiving touchdowns: 31
- Stats at Pro Football Reference

Floyd Turner Jr. (born May 29, 1966) is an American former professional football player who was a wide receiver in the National Football League (NFL). He played nine seasons for New Orleans Saints (1989–1993), the Indianapolis Colts (1994–1995), and the Baltimore Ravens (1996, 1998). He played college football for the Northwestern State Demons before being selected by the Saints in the sixth round of the 1990 NFL draft. After his playing days ended, Turner was involved in a check laundering scheme that stole over 12 million dollars from Bank One.

Turner wore number 88 with the Colts just before the arrival of Marvin Harrison. He wore number 87 with the Baltimore Ravens.

== NFL career statistics ==
Legend
**Bold**	Career high

=== Regular season ===
Year	Team	Games		Receiving				
Year	Team	GP	GS	Rec	Yds	Avg	Lng	TD
1989	NOR	13	1	22	279	12.7	54	1
1990	NOR	**16**	0	21	396	**18.9**	**68**	4
1991	NOR	**16**	4	**64**	**927**	14.5	65	**8**
1992	NOR	2	2	5	43	8.6	18	0
1993	NOR	10	2	12	163	13.6	52	1
1994	IND	**16**	**16**	52	593	11.4	28	6
1995	IND	14	12	35	431	12.3	47	4
1996	BAL	11	6	38	461	12.1	27	2
1998	BAL	**16**	3	32	512	16.0	66	5
Career		114	46	281	3,805	13.5	68	31

=== Playoffs ===
Year	Team	Games		Receiving				
Year	Team	GP	GS	Rec	Yds	Avg	Lng	TD
1990	NOR	1	0	1	6	6.0	6	0
1991	NOR	1	0	5	75	**15.0**	26	1
1995	IND	**3**	**3**	**9**	**134**	14.9	**47**	**2**
Career		5	3	15	215	14.3	47	3
