= Clif Groce =

American football player (born 1972)

No. 27, 33, 46
- Position: Running back

Personal information
- Born: July 30, 1972 (age 54); College Station, Texas, U.S.
- Listed height: 5 ft 11 in (1.80 m)
- Listed weight: 245 lb (111 kg)

Career information
- High school: A&M Consolidated (College Station)
- College: Texas A&M
- NFL draft: 1995: undrafted

Career history
- Indianapolis Colts (1995–1998); New England Patriots (1998); Cincinnati Bengals (1998–2000); Houston Texans (2002)*
- * Offseason or practice squad member only

Career NFL statistics
- Rushing attempts-yards: 67-276
- Receptions-yards: 49-305
- Touchdowns: 1
- Stats at Pro Football Reference

Clifton Allen Groce (born July 30, 1972) is an American former professional football player who was a running back in the National Football League. He played college football for the Texas A&M Aggies before playing in the NFL for the Indianapolis Colts from 1995 to 1997 and the Cincinnati Bengals from 1999 to 2000. He signed with the Houston Texans in 2002, but he did not play.
