= Derek West (American football) =

American football player (born 1972)

No. 72, 73
- Position: Offensive tackle

Personal information
- Born: March 28, 1972 (age 54); Denver, Colorado, U.S.
- Listed height: 6 ft 8 in (2.03 m)
- Listed weight: 309 lb (140 kg)

Career information
- High school: Arvada (CO) Pomona
- College: Colorado
- NFL draft: 1995: 5th round, 149th overall pick

Career history
- Indianapolis Colts (1995–1997); Rhein Fire (1998); Arizona Cardinals (1999)*
- * Offseason or practice squad member only

Career NFL statistics
- Games played: 5
- Stats at Pro Football Reference

Derek West (born March 28, 1972) is an American former professional football player who was a tackle for the Indianapolis Colts of the National Football League (NFL). He played college football for the Colorado Buffaloes and was selected by Indianapolis in the fifth round of the 1995 NFL draft. He played for the Colts from 1995 to 1997.
