= 2002 New York Jets season =

2002 season of NFL team New York Jets

- Owner: Woody & Christopher Johnson
- Head coach: Herman Edwards
- Home stadium: The Meadowlands

Results
- Record: 9–7
- Division place: 1st AFC East
- Playoffs: Won Wild Card Playoffs (vs. Colts) 41–0; Lost Divisional Playoffs (at Raiders) 10–30
- All-Pros: C Kevin Mawae (2nd team)
- Pro Bowlers: C Kevin Mawae; DE John Abraham

Uniform
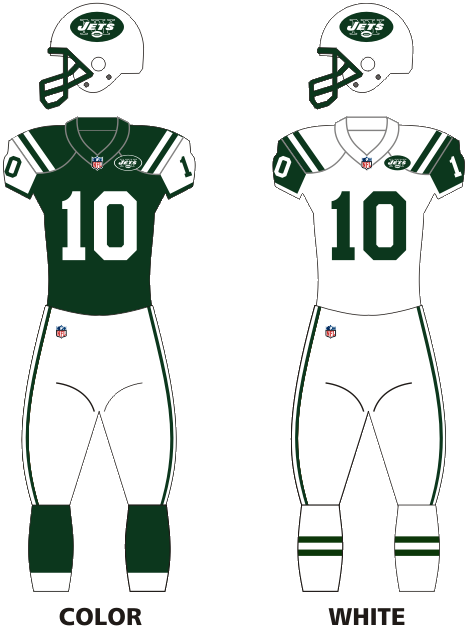

The 2002 season was the New York Jets' 33rd in the National Football League (NFL), their 43rd season overall and their second under head coach Herman Edwards. The team tried to improve upon their 10–6 record from 2001 but failed to do so after a 2–5 start. However, the Jets recovered and finished 9–7, winning their second AFC East division title.

After a 24–21 week 8 loss to the Cleveland Browns at the Meadowlands dropped the Jets' season record to 2–5, head coach Herman Edwards gave his famous "You play to win the game" response to a question in his press conference the following Tuesday. Edwards' vigorous defense of his team's refusal to quit, along with the midseason debut of quarterback Chad Pennington, helped spark the Jets' turnaround.

After posting a stunning rout of the Indianapolis Colts by a score of 41–0 at the Meadowlands in the Wild Card round of the playoffs, they lost for the second year in a row to the eventual AFC champion Oakland Raiders, 30–10 in the Divisional round.

As of the 2026 season, this is the Jets' most recent AFC East division title and is also the last time they have hosted a home playoff game.

== Offseason ==
Additions	Subtractions
P Matt Turk (Dolphins)	P Tom Tupa (Buccaneers)
CB Aaron Beasley (Jaguars)	G Kerry Jenkins (Buccaneers)
G Dave Szott (Redskins)	DT Shane Burton (Panthers)
DT Josh Evans (Titans)	DE Rick Lyle (Patriots)
CB Donnie Abraham (Buccaneers)	LB James Farrior (Steelers)
LB Sam Cowart (Bills)	WR Craig Yeast (CFL)
DT Larry Webster (Ravens)	G David Loverne (Redskins)
FS Sam Garnes (Giants)	S Victor Green (Patriots)
DE Steve White (Buccaneers)	DE Eric Ogbogu (Bengals)
	S Chris Hayes (Patriots)
	DT Steve Martin (Patriots)
	WR Matthew Hatchette (Raiders)

=== 2002 expansion draft ===
New York Jets selected during the expansion draft
Round	Overall	Name	Position	Expansion team
—	2	Ryan Young	Offensive Tackle	Houston Texans
—	3	Aaron Glenn	Cornerback	Houston Texans
—	3	Marcus Coleman	Cornerback	Houston Texans

=== 2002 NFL draft ===
2002 New York Jets draft
Round	Pick	Player	Position	College	Notes
1	22	Bryan Thomas	DE	UAB	
2	57	Jon McGraw	S	Kansas State	
3	88	Chris Baker	TE	Michigan State	
4	121	Alan Harper	DT	Fresno State	
5	154	Jonathan Goodwin *	G	Michigan	from Washington
Made roster * Made at least one Pro Bowl during career

=== Undrafted free agents ===
2002 undrafted free agents of note
Player	Position	College
Kroy Bailey	Wide receiver	North Carolina
Scott Bradley	Linebacker	Boston College
Jay Brooks	Cornerback	Texas A&M
Jaime Burrow	Linebacker	Nebraska
Ataveus Cash	Wide receiver	Howard
Joe Cooper	Linebacker	Ohio State
Andrew Davison	Cornerback	Kansas
Little John Flowers	Running back	Michigan State
Marcus Floyd	Cornerback	Indiana
Jerimiah Janssen	Linebacker	St. Norbert
Matt Knutson	Tackle	North Dakota
Chad Kuhns	Fullback	Wisconsin
Faaesea Mailo	Guard	USC
Tavon Mason	Wide receiver	Virginia
Kyle McCann	Quarterback	Iowa
Brandon Moore	Guard	Illinois
Idris Price	Linebacker	New Haven
Johnathan Reese	Running back	Columbia
Doug Shanahan	Safety	Hofstra
Chris Smith	Tackle	UC Davis

== Staff ==
2002 New York Jets staff
Front office: Owner – Woody Johnson; Salary cap analyst/pro personnel assistant – Dawn Aponte; Head coaches: Head coach – Herman Edwards; Offensive coaches: Offensive coordinator – Paul Hackett; Running backs – Bishop Harris; Wide receivers – Mose Rison; Tight ends – Phil Pettey; Offensive line – Doug Marrone; Senior offensive assistant – Jimmy Raye; Offensive assistant – Eric Price; Offensive quality control – Mike Henning	Defensive coaches: Defensive coordinator – Ted Cottrell; Linebackers – Bob Sutton; Defensive backs – Bill Bradley; Defensive assistant/linebackers – Dave Merritt; Special teams coaches: Special teams coordinator – Mike Westhoff; Special teams – Al Roberts; Strength and conditioning: Strength and conditioning – John Lott; Strength assistant – Sal Alosi

== Roster ==
2002 New York Jets roster
Quarterbacks (QB): 8 Todd Husak; 10 Chad Pennington; 16 Vinny Testaverde; Running backs (RB): 20 Richie Anderson FB; 34 LaMont Jordan; 28 Curtis Martin; 26 Chad Morton; 33 Jerald Sowell FB; Wide receivers (WR): 84 Jonathan Carter; 80 Wayne Chrebet; 87 Laveranues Coles; 83 Santana Moss PR; 82 Kevin Swayne; 89 Tory Woodbury; Tight ends (TE): 81 Chris Baker; 88 Anthony Becht	Offensive linemen (OL): 76 Jumbo Elliott T; 69 Jason Fabini T; 78 Jonathan Goodwin G; 63 J. P. Machado G; 68 Kevin Mawae C; 67 Kareem McKenzie T; 60 Dennis O'Sullivan C; 71 Chris Smith T; 79 Dave Szott G; 77 Randy Thomas G; Defensive linemen (DL): 94 John Abraham DE; 92 Shaun Ellis DE; 91 Josh Evans DT; 72 Jason Ferguson DT; 98 Alan Harper DT; 93 James Reed DT; 99 Bryan Thomas DE; 75 Larry Webster DT; 95 Steve White DE	Linebackers (LB): 53 Khary Campbell OLB; 56 Sam Cowart OLB; 51 James Darling OLB; 58 Jason Glenn OLB; 55 Marvin Jones MLB; 57 Mo Lewis OLB; 50 Kelvin Moses MLB; Defensive backs (DB): 29 Donnie Abraham CB; 21 Aaron Beasley CB; 39 Andrew Davison CB; 42 Sam Garnes SS; 25 Nick Ferguson SS; 38 Jon McGraw FS; 24 Ray Mickens CB; 22 Damien Robinson FS; Special teams (ST): 85 James Dearth LS; 9 John Hall K; 1 Matt Turk P	Practice squad: 6 Ataveus Cash WR; 44 Little John Flowers RB; 62 Faaesea Mailo G (IR); 97 Giradie Mercer DT; 61 Brandon Moore G; 36 Johnathan Reese RB; Reserve: 23 Jamie Henderson CB (IR); Rookies in italics 53 active, 2 reserve, 5 practice squad

== Preseason ==
Week	Date	Opponent	Result	Record	Venue	Recap
1	August 8	at Pittsburgh Steelers	W 16–6	1–0	Heinz Field	Recap
2	August 15	at Baltimore Ravens	W 34–16	2–0	Ravens Stadium	Recap
3	August 24	New York Giants	W 28–7	3–0	Giants Stadium	Recap
4	August 30	Philadelphia Eagles	W 23–16	4–0	Giants Stadium	Recap

== Regular season ==
=== Schedule ===
Under the NFL's newly established schedule rotation, during the 2002 regular season the Jets played against all of the teams from the AFC West, as well as the Cleveland Browns from the AFC North and the Jacksonville Jaguars from the AFC South, who finished in the same positions as the Jets in their respective divisions in 2001. Their non-conference opponents were from the NFC North.

Week	Date	Opponent	Result	Record	Venue	Recap
1	September 8	at **Buffalo Bills**	**W** 37–31 (OT)	1–0	Ralph Wilson Stadium	Recap
2	September 15	**New England Patriots**	**L** 7–44	1–1	Giants Stadium	Recap
3	September 22	at **Miami Dolphins**	**L** 3–30	1–2	Pro Player Stadium	Recap
4	September 29	at Jacksonville Jaguars	**L** 3–28	1–3	Alltel Stadium	Recap
5	October 6	Kansas City Chiefs	**L** 25–29	1–4	Giants Stadium	Recap
6	Bye					
7	October 20	Minnesota Vikings	**W** 20–7	2–4	Giants Stadium	Recap
8	October 27	Cleveland Browns	**L** 21–24	2–5	Giants Stadium	Recap
9	November 3	at San Diego Chargers	**W** 44–13	3–5	Qualcomm Stadium	Recap
10	November 10	**Miami Dolphins**	**W** 13–10	4–5	Giants Stadium	Recap
11	November 17	at Detroit Lions	**W** 31–14	5–5	Ford Field	Recap
12	November 24	**Buffalo Bills**	**W** 31–13	6–5	Giants Stadium	Recap
13	December 2	at Oakland Raiders	**L** 20–26	6–6	Network Associates Coliseum	Recap
14	December 8	Denver Broncos	**W** 19–13	7–6	Giants Stadium	Recap
15	December 15	at Chicago Bears	**L** 13–20	7–7	Memorial Stadium	Recap
16	December 22	at **New England Patriots**	**W** 30–17	8–7	Gillette Stadium	Recap
17	December 29	Green Bay Packers	**W** 42–17	9–7	Giants Stadium	Recap

Note: Intra-division opponents are in bold text.

=== Game summaries ===
==== Week 1: at Buffalo Bills ====
Week 1: New York Jets (0–0) at Buffalo Bills (0–0) – Game summary

Quarter	1	2	3	4	OT	Total
**Jets**	0	17	3	11	6	**37**
Bills	3	14	7	7	0	**31**

at Ralph Wilson Stadium, Orchard Park, New York

- Date: September 8, 2002
- Game time: 1:00 p.m.
- Game weather: Sunny, 86 °F (30 °C)
- Game attendance: 72,751
- Referee: Bob McElwee (95)
- TV announcers (CBS): Greg Gumbel, Phil Simms, and Armen Keteyian
- Recap, Game Book

Game information

**First quarter**

- BUF – Mike Hollis 52-yard field goal, 9:04. Bills 3–0. **Drive: 11 plays, 49 yards, 5:56.**

**Second quarter**

- BUF – Travis Henry 5-yard run (Mike Hollis kick), 12:25. Bills 10–0. **Drive: 10 plays, 80 yards, 5:31.**
- NYJ – Chad Morton 98-yard kickoff return (John Hall kick), 12:11. Bills 10–7. **Drive: 0 plays, 0 yards, 0:14.**
- NYJ – Anthony Becht 1-yard pass from Vinny Testaverde (John Hall kick), 9:12. Jets 14–10. **Drive: 3 plays, 19 yards, 1:36.**
- BUF – Travis Henry 3-yard run (Mike Hollis kick), 2:37. Bills 17–14. **Drive: 11 plays, 74 yards, 6:35.**
- NYJ – John Hall 34-yard field goal, 0:05. Tied 17–17. **Drive: 12 plays, 59 yards, 2:32.**

**Third quarter**

- NYJ – John Hall 45-yard field goal, 10:50. Jets 20–17. **Drive: 7 plays, 42 yards, 4:10.**
- BUF – Travis Henry 2-yard run, 0:58. Bills 24–20. **Drive: 6 plays, 29 yards, 3:26.**

**Fourth quarter**

- NYJ – John Hall 33-yard field goal, 9:25. Bills 24–23. **Drive: 4 plays, 9 yards, 1:30.**
- NYJ – Wayne Chrebet 18-yard pass from Vinny Testaverde (Vinny Testaverde–Anthony Becht pass), 4:47. Jets 31–24. **Drive: 4 plays, 60 yards, 1:35.**
- BUF – Eric Moulds 29-yard pass from Drew Bledsoe (Mike Hollis kick), 0:26. Tied 31–31. **Drive: 14 plays, 76 yards, 4:21.**

**Overtime**

- NYJ – Chad Morton 96-yard kickoff return, 14:46. Jets 37–31. **Drive: 0 plays, 0 yards, 0:14.**

**Top passers**

- NYJ – Vinny Testaverde – 24/30, 210 yards, 2 TD
- BUF – Drew Bledsoe – 26/39, 271 yards, TD, 2 INT

**Top rushers**

- NYJ – LaMont Jordan – 7 rushes, 32 yards
- BUF – Travis Henry – 31 rushes, 149 yards, 3 TD

**Top receivers**

- NYJ – Wayne Chrebet – 5 receptions, 58 yards, TD
- BUF – Eric Moulds – 8 receptions, 112 yards, TD

==== Week 2: vs. New England Patriots ====
Week 2: New England Patriots (1–0) at New York Jets (1–0) – Game summary

Quarter	1	2	3	4	Total
**Patriots**	0	10	17	17	**44**
Jets	0	0	7	0	**7**

at Giants Stadium, East Rutherford, New Jersey

- Date: September 15, 2002
- Game time: 1:00 pm
- Game weather: Hazy, rain, 78 °F (26 °C)
- Game attendance: 78,726
- Referee: Larry Nemmers (20)
- TV announcers (CBS): Dick Enberg, Dan Dierdorf, and Bonnie Bernstein
- Recap, Game Book

Game information

**Second quarter**

- NE – Cam Cleeland 1-yard pass from Tom Brady (Adam Vinatieri kick), 9:00. Patriots 7–0. **Drive: 6 plays, 80 yards, 3:06.**
- NE – Adam Vinatieri 28-yard field goal, 0:05. Patriots 10–0. **Drive: 19 plays, 70 yards, 6:40.**

**Third quarter**

- NE – Tebucky Jones 24-yard fumble return (Adam Vinatieri kick), 13:15. Patriots 17–0.
- NE – Adam Vinatieri 31-yard field goal, 5:56. Patriots 20–0. **Drive: 12 plays, 65 yards, 6:02.**
- NE – Victor Green 90-yard interception return (Adam Vinatieri kick), 4:47. Patriots 27–0.
- NYJ – Anthony Becht 11-yard pass from Vinny Testaverde (John Hall kick), 0:57. Patriots 27–7. **Drive: 4 plays, 69 yards, 1:53.**

**Fourth quarter**

- NE – Deion Branch 49-yard pass from Tom Brady (Adam Vinatieri kick), 11:13. Patriots 34–7. **Drive: 8 plays, 75 yards, 4:57.**
- NE – Adam Vinatieri 40-yard field goal, 8:47. Patriots 37–7. **Drive: 4 plays, 2 yards, 1:26.**
- NE – Kevin Faulk 2-yard run (Adam Vinatieri kick), 3:22. Patriots 44–7. **Drive: 7 plays, 37 yards, 4:35.**

**Top passers**

- NE – Tom Brady – 25/35, 269 yards, 2 TD, INT
- NYJ – Vinny Testaverde – 15/23, 150 yards, TD, INT

**Top rushers**

- NE – Antowain Smith – 15 rushes, 66 yards
- NYJ – Matt Turk – 1 rush, 14 yards

**Top receivers**

- NE – Troy Brown – 9 receptions, 94 yards
- NYJ – Santana Moss – 1 reception, 35 yards

==== Week 3: at Miami Dolphins ====
Week 3: New York Jets (1–1) at Miami Dolphins (2–0) – Game summary

Quarter	1	2	3	4	Total
Jets	0	3	0	0	**3**
**Dolphins**	10	3	0	17	**30**

at Pro Player Stadium, Miami Gardens, Florida

- Date: September 22, 2002
- Game time: 1:00 pm
- Game weather: Sunny, 90 °F (32 °C)
- Game attendance: 73,426
- Referee: Gerald Austin (34)
- TV announcers (CBS): Greg Gumbel, Phil Simms, and Armen Keteyian
- Recap, Game Book

Game information

**First quarter**

- MIA – Olindo Mare 53-yard field goal, 3:30. Dolphins 3–0. **Drive: 8 plays, 45 yards, 4:07.**
- MIA – Randy McMichael 10-yard pass from Jay Fiedler (Olindo Mare kick), 1:10. Dolphins 10–0. **Drive: 2 plays, 26 yards, 0:47.**

**Second quarter**

- MIA – Olindo Mare 25-yard field goal, 13:30. Dolphins 13–0. **Drive: 4 plays, 5 yards, 1:33.**
- NYJ – John Hall 20-yard field goal, 10:00. Dolphins 13–3. **Drive: 7 plays, 56 yards, 3:44.**

**Fourth quarter**

- MIA – Olindo Mare 29-yard field goal, 12:20. Dolphins 16–3. **Drive: 13 plays, 81 yards, 8:31.**
- MIA – Ricky Williams 53-yard run (Olindo Mare kick), 5:00. Dolphins 23–3. **Drive: 6 plays, 81 yards, 3:49.**
- MIA – Travis Minor 5-yard run (Olindo Mare kick), 2:00. Dolphins 30–3. **Drive: 4 plays, 21 yards, 2:08.**

**Top passers**

- NYJ – Vinny Testaverde – 14/25, 125 yards, 2 INT
- MIA – Jay Fiedler – 16/30, 185 yards, TD

**Top rushers**

- NYJ – Curtis Martin – 16 rushes, 43 yards
- MIA – Ricky Williams – 24 rushes, 151 yards, TD

**Top receivers**

- NYJ – Wayne Chrebet – 5 receptions, 64 yards
- MIA – Randy McMichael – 5 receptions, 79 yards, TD

==== Week 4: at Jacksonville Jaguars ====
Week 4: New York Jets (1–2) at Jacksonville Jaguars (1–1) – Game summary

Quarter	1	2	3	4	Total
Jets	0	3	0	0	**3**
**Jaguars**	7	7	14	0	**28**

at Alltel Stadium, Jacksonville, Florida

- Date: September 29, 2002
- Game time: 1:00 pm
- Game attendance: 55,670
- Referee: Walt Coleman
- TV announcers (CBS): Ian Eagle, Solomon Wilcots
- Recap

Game information

**First quarter**

- JAX – Stacey Mack 1-yard run (Hayden Epstein kick), 13:34. Jaguars 7–0. **Drive: 2 plays, 73 yards, 0:59.**

**Second quarter**

- JAX – Stacey Mack 1-yard run (Hayden Epstein kick), 7:55. Jaguars 14–0. **Drive: 7 plays, 52 yards, 4:11.**
- NYJ – John Hall 46-yard field goal, 5:59. Jaguars 14–3. **Drive: 6 plays, 39 yards, 1:52.**

**Third quarter**

- JAX – Stacey Mack 8-yard run (Hayden Epstein kick), 10:40. Jaguars 21–3. **Drive: 4 plays, 46 yards, 2:13.**
- JAX – Fred Taylor 22-yard run (Hayden Epstein kick), 0:48. Jaguars 28–3. **Drive: 7 plays, 56 yards, 4:18.**

**Top passers**

- NYJ – Chad Pennington – 21/34, 281 yards, INT
- JAX – Mark Brunell – 10/15, 173 yards

**Top rushers**

- NYJ – Curtis Martin – 8 rushes, 44 yards
- JAX – Fred Taylor – 21 rushes, 142 yards, TD

**Top receivers**

- NYJ – Laveranues Coles – 8 receptions, 97 yards
- JAX – Fred Taylor – 3 receptions, 95 yards

==== Week 5: vs. Kansas City Chiefs ====
Week 5: Kansas City Chiefs (2–2) at New York Jets (1–3) – Game summary

Quarter	1	2	3	4	Total
**Chiefs**	3	9	3	14	**29**
Jets	7	8	0	10	**25**

at Giants Stadium, East Rutherford, New Jersey

- Date: October 6, 2002
- Game time: 4:05 pm
- Game weather: Partly Cloudy, 66 °F (19 °C)
- Game attendance: 78,149
- Referee: Johnny Grier (23)
- TV announcers (CBS): Dick Enberg, Dan Dierdorf, and Bonnie Bernstien
- Recap, Game Book

Game information

**First quarter**

- KC – Morten Anderson 36-yard field goal, 7:18. Chiefs 3–0. **Drive: 7 plays, 23 yards, 3:20.**
- NYJ – Curtis Martin 17-yard run (John Hall kick), 4:56. Jets 7–3. **Drive: 5 plays, 56 yards, 2:36.**

**Second quarter**

- KC – Morten Anderson 40-yard field goal, 9:00. Jets 7–6. **Drive: 12 plays, 58 yards, 6:48.**
- KC – Priest Holmes 12-yard run (pass failed), 1:46. Chiefs 12–7. **Drive: 9 plays, 80 yards, 4:35.**
- NYJ – Anthony Becht 2-yard pass from Chad Pennington (Curtis Martin run), 0:12. Jets 15–12. **Drive: 7 plays, 61 yards, 1:32.**

**Third quarter**

- KC – Morten Anderson 27-yard field goal, 11:11. Tied 15–15. **Drive: 8 plays, 58 yards, 3:54.**

**Fourth quarter**

- NYJ – Santana Moss 27-yard pass from Chad Pennington (John Hall kick), 13:43. Jets 22–15. **Drive: 12 plays, 89 yards, 5:36.**
- KC – Dante Hall 60-yard pass from Trent Green (Morten Anderson kick), 10:32. Tied 22–22. **Drive: 5 plays, 79 yards, 3:16.**
- NYJ – John Hall 25-yard field goal, 3:11. Jets 25–22. **Drive: 14 plays, 61 yards, 7:21.**
- KC – Priest Holmes 19-yard pass from Trent Green (Morten Anderson kick), 0:35. Chiefs 29–25. **Drive: 10 plays, 78 yards, 2:27.**

**Top passers**

- KC – Trent Green – 23/33, 296 yards, 2 TD, INT
- NYJ – Chad Pennington – 22/29, 237 yards, 2 TD, INT

**Top rushers**

- KC – Priest Holmes – 23 rushes, 152 yards, TD
- NYJ – Curtis Martin – 21 rushes, 119 yards, TD

**Top receivers**

- KC – Priest Holmes – 9 receptions, 81 yards, TD
- NYJ – Laveranues Coles – 8 receptions, 116 yards

==== Week 7: vs. Minnesota Vikings ====
Week 7: Minnesota Vikings (1–4) at New York Jets (1–4) – Game summary

Quarter	1	2	3	4	Total
Vikings	0	0	0	7	**7**
**Jets**	3	7	7	3	**20**

at Giants Stadium, East Rutherford, New Jersey

- Date: October 20, 2002
- Game time: 1:00 pm
- Game weather: Partly Cloudy, 57 °F (14 °C)
- Game attendance: 78,516
- Referee: Mike Carey (94)
- TV announcers (FOX): Curt Menefee, Tim Ryan, and John DiScepolo
- Recap, Game Book

Game information

**First quarter**

- NYJ – John Hall 38-yard field goal, 7:42. Jets 3–0. **Drive: 12 plays, 60 yards, 7:27.**

**Second quarter**

- NYJ – Laveranues Coles 7-yard pass from Chad Pennington (John Hall kick), 2:44. Jets 10–0. **Drive: 12 plays, 84 yards, 6:31.**

**Third quarter**

- NYJ – Curtis Martin 5-yard run (John Hall kick), 7:17. Jets 17–0. **Drive: 6 plays, 90 yards, 3:25.**

**Fourth quarter**

- NYJ – John Hall 37-yard field goal, 6:24. Jets 20–0. **Drive: 10 plays, 73 yards, 5:45.**
- MIN – Moe Williams 1-yard run (Gary Anderson kick), 3:17. Jets 20–7. **Drive: 9 plays, 72 yards, 3:13.**

**Top passers**

- MIN – Daunte Culpepper – 26/39, 288 yards, 3 INT
- NYJ – Chad Pennington – 24/29, 324 yards, TD

**Top rushers**

- MIN – Michael Bennett – 12 rushes, 56 yards
- NYJ – Curtis Martin – 21 rushes, 70 yards, TD

**Top receivers**

- MIN – Randy Moss – 4 receptions, 86 yards
- NYJ – Santana Moss – 5 receptions, 111 yards

==== Week 8: vs. Cleveland Browns ====
Week 8: Cleveland Browns (3–4) at New York Jets (2–4) – Game summary

Quarter	1	2	3	4	Total
**Browns**	3	3	15	3	**24**
Jets	14	7	0	0	**21**

at Giants Stadium, East Rutherford, New Jersey

- Date: October 27, 2002
- Game time: 1:00 pm
- Game weather: Overcast, 57 °F (14 °C)
- Game attendance: 78,502
- Referee: Bob McElwee (95)
- TV announcers (CBS): Kevin Harlan, Randy Cross, and Beasley Reece
- Recap, Game Book

Game information

**First quarter**

- NYJ – Santana Moss 63-yard punt return (John Hall kick), 14:37. Jets 7–0.
- CLE – Phil Dawson 23-yard field goal, 8:15. Jets 7–3. **Drive: 10 plays, 74 yards, 6:09.**
- NYJ – Laveranues Coles 37-yard pass from Chad Pennington (John Hall kick), 6:10. Jets 14–3. **Drive: 5 plays, 70 yards, 2:15.**

**Second quarter**

- NYJ – Wayne Chrebet 8-yard pass from Chad Pennington (John Hall kick), 14:51. Jets 21–3. **Drive: 8 plays, 62 yards, 4:22.**
- CLE – Phil Dawson 26-yard field goal, 7:33. Jets 21–6. **Drive: 7 plays, 41 yards, 3:39.**

**Third quarter**

- CLE – Mark Campbell 5-yard pass from Tim Couch (Phil Dawson kick), 4:57. Jets 21–13. **Drive: 11 plays, 60 yards, 4:41.**
- CLE – Andre Davis 4-yard pass from Tim Couch (Tim Couch–Dennis Northcutt Pass), 0:17. Tied 21–21. **Drive: 3 plays, 11 yards, 1:26.**

**Fourth quarter**

- CLE – Phil Dawson 35-yard field goal, 4:20. Browns 24–21. **Drive: 14 plays, 61 yards, 8:33.**

**Top passers**

- CLE – Tim Couch – 32/48, 294 yards, 2 TD
- NYJ – Chad Pennington – 19/26, 183 yards, 2 TD, INT

**Top rushers**

- CLE – Jamel White – 14 rushes, 25 yards
- NYJ – Curtis Martin – 18 rushes, 65 yards

**Top receivers**

- CLE – Kevin Johnson – 5 receptions, 73 yards
- NYJ – Laveranues Coles – 5 receptions, 61 yards, TD

==== Week 9: at San Diego Chargers ====
Week 9: New York Jets (2–5) at San Diego Chargers (6–1) – Game summary

Quarter	1	2	3	4	Total
**Jets**	14	17	3	10	**44**
Chargers	0	7	6	0	**13**

at Qualcomm Stadium, San Diego, California

- Date: November 3, 2002
- Game time: 4:05 pm
- Game weather: Sunny, 69 °F (21 °C)
- Game attendance: 59,772
- Referee: Bill Leavy (127)
- TV announcers (CBS): Dick Enberg, Dan Dierdorf, and Bonnie Bernstein
- Recap, Game Book

Game information

**First quarter**

- NYJ – Chad Pennington 8-yard run (John Hall kick), 3:45. Jets 7–0. **Drive: 12 plays, 91 yards, 6:55.**
- NYJ – Santana Moss 52-yard punt return (John Hall kick), 1:10. Jets 14–0.

**Second quarter**

- NYJ – Anthony Becht 1-yard pass from Chad Pennington (John Hall kick), 6:17. Jets 21–0. **Drive: 6 plays, 48 yards, 3:40.**
- SD – Curtis Conway 13-yard pass from Drew Brees (Steve Christie kick), 3:44. Jets 21–7. **Drive: 6 plays, 67 yards, 2:48.**
- NYJ – Curtis Martin 17-yard run (John Hall kick), 1:10. Jets 28–7. **Drive: 6 plays, 60 yards, 2:28.**
- NYJ – John Hall 24-yard field goal, 0:06. Jets 31–7. **Drive: 4 plays, 4 yards, 0:16.**

**Third quarter**

- NYJ – John Hall 32-yard field goal, 6:18. Jets 34–7. **Drive: 11 plays, 52 yards, 6:00.**
- SD – LaDainian Tomlinson 7-yard run (kick blocked), 2:00. Jets 34–13. **Drive: 6 plays, 67 yards, 2:22.**

**Fourth Quarter**

- NYJ – John Hall 38-yard field goal, 8:02. Jets 37–13. **Drive: 7 plays, 17 yards, 4:43.**
- NYJ – LaMont Jordan 61-yard run (John Hall kick), 2:00. Jets 44–13. **Drive: 8 plays, 90 yards, 3:31.**

**Top passers**

- NYJ – Chad Pennington – 28/37, 253 yards, TD
- SD – Drew Brees – 22/35, 192 yards, TD, 2 INT

**Top rushers**

- NYJ – LaMont Jordan – 13 rushes, 107 yards, TD
- SD – LaDainian Tomlinson – 12 rushes, 60 yards, TD

**Top receivers**

- NYJ – Laveranues Coles – 5 receptions, 60 yards
- SD – Stephen Alexander – 7 receptions, 84 yards

==== Week 10: vs. Miami Dolphins ====
Week 10: Miami Dolphins (5–3) at New York Jets (3–5) – Game summary

Quarter	1	2	3	4	Total
Dolphins	0	3	7	0	**10**
**Jets**	7	3	0	3	**13**

at Giants Stadium, East Rutherford, New Jersey

- Date: November 10, 2002
- Game time: 8:30 pm
- Game weather: Cloudy, 65 °F (18 °C)
- Game attendance: 78,920
- Referee: Larry Nemmers (20)
- TV announcers (ESPN): Mike Patrick, Paul Maguire, Joe Theismann, and Suzy Kolber
- Recap, Game Book

Game information

**First quarter**

- NYJ – Curtis Martin 6-yard run (John Hall kick), 7:00. Jets 7–0. **Drive: 1 play, 6 yards, 0:06.**

**Second quarter**

- MIA – Olindo Mare 28-yard field goal, 11:36. Jets 7–3. **Drive: 11 plays, 69 yards, 5:10.**
- NYJ – John Hall 30-yard field goal, 0:03. Jets 10–3. **Drive: 9 plays, 34 yards, 2:51.**

**Third quarter**

- MIA – Rob Konrad 4-yard pass from Ray Lucas (Olindo Mare kick), 7:26. Tied 10–10. **Drive: 5 plays, 39 yards, 2:22.**

**Fourth quarter**

- NYJ – John Hall 27 field goal, 2:22. Jets 13–10. **Drive: 11 plays, 84 yards, 5:09.**

**Top passers**

- MIA – Ray Lucas – 19/28, 227 yards, 1 TD
- NYJ – Chad Pennington – 17/27, 167 yards

**Top rushers**

- MIA – Ricky Williams – 20 rushes, 53 yards
- NYJ – Curtis Martin – 19 rushes, 74 yards, TD

**Top receivers**

- MIA – James McKnight – 2 receptions, 52 yards
- NYJ – Laveranues Coles – 5 receptions, 80 yards

==== Week 11: at Detroit Lions ====
Week 11: New York Jets (4–5) at Detroit Lions (3–6) – Game summary

Quarter	1	2	3	4	Total
**Jets**	7	6	8	10	**31**
Lions	0	7	7	0	**14**

at Ford Field, Detroit, Michigan

- Date: November 17, 2002
- Game time: 4:15 pm
- Game weather: None (indoor stadium)
- Game attendance: 61,720
- Referee: Johnny Grier (23)
- TV announcers (CBS): Ian Eagle, Solomon Wilcots
- Recap, Game Book

Game information

**First quarter**

- NYJ – Santana Moss 10-yard pass from Chad Pennington (John Hall kick), 6:30. Jets 7–0. **Drive: 12 plays, 80 yards, 6:16.**

**Second quarter**

- NYJ – Wayne Chrebet 15-yard pass from Chad Pennington (kick blocked), 14:20. Jets 13–0. **Drive: 7 plays, 77 yards, 4:47.**
- DET – Bill Schroeder 37-yard pass from Joey Harrington (Jason Hanson kick), 11:20. Jets 13–7. **Drive: 6 plays, 78 yards, 3:19.**

**Third quarter**

- DET – Bill Schroeder 7-yard pass from Joey Harrington (Jason Hanson kick), 7:15. Lions 14–13. **Drive: 8 plays, 80 yards, 4:32.**
- NYJ – Wayne Chrebet 4-yard pass from Chad Pennington (Chad Pennington–Laveranues Coles pass), 0:41. Jets 21–14. **Drive: 12 plays, 66 yards, 6:34.**

**Fourth quarter**

- NYJ – John Hall 22-yard field goal, 11:20. Jets 24–14. **Drive: 7 plays, 43 yards, 3:32.**
- NYJ – Anthony Becht 1-yard pass from Chad Pennington (John Hall kick), 3:50. Jets 31–14. **Drive: 10 plays, 77 yards, 6:26.**

**Top passers**

- NYJ – Chad Pennington – 21/26, 229 yards, 4 TD, INT
- DET – Joey Harrington – 15/30, 171 yards, 2 TD, INT

**Top rushers**

- NYJ – Curtis Martin – 22 rushes, 112 yards
- DET – James Stewart – 15 rushes, 93 yards

**Top receivers**

- NYJ – Laveranues Coles – 7 receptions, 114 yards
- DET – Bill Schroeder – 3 receptions, 57 yards, 2 TD

==== Week 12: vs. Buffalo Bills ====
Week 12: Buffalo Bills (5–5) at New York Jets (5–5) – Game summary

Quarter	1	2	3	4	Total
Bills	3	0	10	0	**13**
**Jets**	3	14	7	7	**31**

at Giants Stadium, East Rutherford, New Jersey

- Date: November 24, 2002
- Game time: 1:00 pm
- Game weather: Partly Cloudy, 50 °F (10 °C)
- Game attendance: 78,745
- Referee: Ron Blum (7)
- TV announcers (CBS): Dick Enberg, Dan Dierdorf and Bonnie Bernstein
- Recap, Game Book

Game information

**First quarter**

- BUF – Mike Hollis 43-yard field goal, 8:31. Bills 3–0. **Drive: 13 plays, 55 yards, 6:34.**
- NYJ – John Hall 23-yard field goal, 3:20. Tied 3–3. **Drive: 10 plays, 58 yards, 5:32.**

**Second quarter**

- NYJ – LaMont Jordan 1-yard run (John Hall kick), 11:20. Jets 10–3. **Drive: 9 plays, 50 yards, 4:24.**
- NYJ – Curtis Martin 9-yard run (John Hall kick), 2:59. Jets 17–3. **Drive: 7 plays, 58 yards, 3:40.**

**Third quarter**

- NYJ – Laveranues Coles 11-yard pass from Chad Pennington (John Hall kick), 13:05. Jets 24–3. **Drive: 4 plays, 65 yards, 2:07.**
- BUF – Travis Henry 1-yard run (Mike Hollis kick), 8:05. Jets 24–10. **Drive: 9 plays, 69 yards, 5:00.**
- BUF – Mike Hollis 40-yard field goal, 1:41. Jets 24–13. **Drive: 10 plays, 67 yards, 4:44.**

**Fourth quarter**

- NYJ – Chad Pennington 1-yard run (John Hall kick), 9:55. Jets 31–13. **Drive: 11 plays, 65 yards, 6:52.**

**Top passers**

- BUF – Drew Bledsoe – 21/33, 181 yards, 2 INT
- NYJ – Chad Pennington – 15/24, 178 yards, TD

**Top rushers**

- BUF – Travis Henry – 17 rushes, 83 yards, TD
- NYJ – Curtis Martin – 21 rushes, 120 yards, TD

**Top receivers**

- BUF – Peerless Price – 6 receptions, 49 yards
- NYJ – Laveranues Coles – 7 receptions, 78 yards, TD

==== Week 13: at Oakland Raiders ====
Week 13: New York Jets (6–5) at Oakland Raiders (7–4) – Game summary

Quarter	1	2	3	4	Total
Jets	0	10	0	10	**20**
**Raiders**	3	3	14	6	**26**

at Network Associates Coliseum, Oakland, California

- Date: December 2, 2002
- Game time: 9:00 pm
- Game weather: Clear, 57 °F (14 °C)
- Game attendance: 62,257
- Referee: Bernie Kukar (86)
- TV announcers (ABC): Al Michaels, John Madden and Melissa Stark
- Recap, Game Book

Game information

**First quarter**

- OAK – Sebastian Janikowski 23-yard field goal, 8:10. Raiders 3–0. **Drive: 11 plays, 62 yards, 4:48.**

**Second quarter**

- OAK – Sebastian Janikowski 48-yard field goal, 9:05. Raiders 6–0. **Drive: 9 plays, 35 yards, 4:24.**
- NYJ – Jerald Sowell 6-yard pass from Chad Pennington (John Hall kick), 2:05. Jets 7–6. **Drive: 4 plays, 80 yards, 2:03.**
- NYJ – John Hall 36-yard field goal, 0:06. Jets 10–6. **Drive: 4 plays, 11 yards, 0:37.**

**Third quarter**

- OAK – Jerry Rice 26-yard pass from Rich Gannon (Sebastian Janikowski kick), 11:06. Raiders 13–10. **Drive: 7 plays, 76 yards, 4:01.**
- OAK – Zack Crockett 1-yard run (Sebastian Janikowski kick), 3:00. Raiders 20–10. **Drive: 4 plays, 12 yards, 2:03.**

**Fourth quarter**

- NYJ – John Hall 45-yard field goal, 13:35. Raiders 20–13. **Drive: 9 plays, 43 yards, 5:18.**
- OAK – Sebastian Janikowski 36-yard field goal, 7:48. Raiders 23–13. **Drive: 10 plays, 57 yards, 4:30.**
- NYJ – Wayne Chrebet 13-yard pass from Chad Pennington (John Hall kick), 5:56. Raiders 23–20. **Drive: 7 plays, 71 yards, 2:12.**
- OAK – Sebastian Janikowski 29-yard field goal, 2:00. Raiders 26–20. **Drive: 10 plays, 63 yards, 4:20.**

**Top passers**

- NYJ – Chad Pennington – 22/34, 265 yards, 2 TD, INT
- OAK – Rich Gannon – 31/42, 342 yards, TD

**Top rushers**

- NYJ – Curtis Martin – 11 rushes, 26 yards
- OAK – Charlie Garner – 12 rushes, 52 yards

**Top receivers**

- NYJ – Laveranues Coles – 10 receptions, 158 yards
- OAK – Tim Brown – 8 receptions, 90 yards

==== Week 14: vs. Denver Broncos ====
Week 14: Denver Broncos (7–5) at New York Jets (6–6) – Game summary

Quarter	1	2	3	4	Total
Broncos	3	10	0	0	**13**
**Jets**	0	6	3	10	**19**

at Giants Stadium, East Rutherford, New Jersey

- Date: December 8, 2002
- Game time: 4:15 p.m.
- Game attendance: 78,521
- Referee: Tom White (123)
- TV announcers (CBS): Dick Enberg, Dan Dierdorf, and Bonnie Bernstein
- Recap, Game Book

Game information

**First quarter**

- DEN – Jason Elam 22-yard field goal, 6:59. Broncos 3–0. **Drive: 14 plays, 68 yards, 8:01..**

**Second quarter**

- NYJ – Curtis Martin 1-yard run (kick blocked), 14:57. Jets 6–3. **Drive: 13 plays, 76 yards, 7:02..**
- DEN – Jason Elam 23-yard field goal, 8:34. Tied 6–6. **Drive: 13 plays, 60 yards, 6:23..**
- DEN – Ashley Lelie 10-yard pass from Brian Griese (Jason Elam kick), 0:11. Broncos 13–6. **Drive: 8 plays, 67 yards, 1:36..**

**Third quarter**

- NYJ – John Hall 43-yard field goal, 10:21. Broncos 13–9. **Drive: 9 plays, 30 yards, 4:39..**

**Fourth quarter**

- NYJ – Laveranues Coles 28-yard pass from Chad Pennington (John Hall kick), 14:43. Jets 16–13. **Drive: 8 plays, 64 yards, 3:25..**
- NYJ – John Hall 24-yard field goal, 5:56. Jets 19–13. **Drive: 14 plays, 72 yards, 7:19..**

**Top passers**

- DEN – Brian Griese – 28/37, 266 yards, TD, INT
- NYJ – Chad Pennington – 19/30, 244 yards, TD

**Top rushers**

- DEN – Clinton Portis – 24 rushes, 103 yards
- NYJ – Curtis Martin – 18 rushes, 57 yards, TD

**Top receivers**

- DEN – Shannon Sharpe – 9 receptions, 100 yards
- NYJ – Laveranues Coles – 6 receptions, 126 yards, TD

==== Week 15: at Chicago Bears ====
Week 15: New York Jets (7–6) at Chicago Bears (3–10) – Game summary

Quarter	1	2	3	4	Total
Jets	0	0	10	3	**13**
**Bears**	0	10	7	3	**20**

at Memorial Stadium, Champaign, Illinois

- Date: December 15, 2002
- Game time: 1:00 pm
- Game weather: Partly Cloudy, 43 °F (6 °C)
- Game attendance: 62,226
- Referee: Mike Carey (94)
- TV announcers (CBS): Kevin Harlan, Randy Cross, and Beasley Reece
- Recap. Game Book

Game information

**Second quarter**

- CHI – Paul Edinger 53-yard field goal, 8:30. Bears 3–0. **Drive: 5 plays, 26 yards, 3:23.**
- CHI – Adrian Peterson 5-yard run (Paul Edinger kick), 1:41. Bears 10–0. **Drive: 11 plays, 67 yards, 5:23.**

**Third quarter**

- NYJ – Wayne Chrebet 5-yard pass from Chad Pennington (John Hall kick), 11:11. Bears 10–7. **Drive: 7 plays, 69 yards, 4:05.**
- CHI – Leon Johnson 2-yard run (Paul Edinger kick), 7:42. Bears 17–7. **Drive: 6 plays, 63 yards, 3:36.**
- NYJ – John Hall 42-yard field goal, 0:36. Bears 17–10. **Drive: 11 plays, 50 yards, 7:06.**

**Fourth quarter**

- NYJ – John Hall 28-yard field goal, 7:26. Bears 17–13. **Drive: 11 plays, 83 yards, 4:42.**
- CHI – Paul Edinger 48-yard field goal, 2:44. Bears 20–13. **Drive: 11 plays, 31 yards, 4:44.**

**Top passers**

- NYJ – Chad Pennington – 22/33, 207 yards, TD
- CHI – Chris Chandler – 22/27, 177 yards

**Top rushers**

- NYJ – Curtis Martin – 21 rushes, 127 yards
- CHI – Leon Johnson – 14 rushes, 56 yards, TD

**Top receivers**

- NYJ – Laveranues Coles – 5 receptions, 71 yards
- CHI – Marty Booker – 9 receptions, 62 yards

==== Week 16: at New England Patriots ====
Week 16: New York Jets (7–7) at New England Patriots (8–6) – Game summary

Quarter	1	2	3	4	Total
**Jets**	14	3	3	10	**30**
Patriots	7	3	7	0	**17**

at Gillette Stadium, Foxboro, Massachusetts

- Date: December 22, 2002
- Game time: 8:30 pm
- Game weather: Partly Cloudy, 40 °F (4 °C)
- Game attendance: 68,436
- Referee: Tony Corrente (99)
- TV announcers (ESPN): Mike Patrick, Paul Maguire, Joe Theismann, and Suzy Kolber
- Recap, Game Book

Game information

**First quarter**

- NYJ – Laveranues Coles 32-yard pass from Chad Pennington (John Hall kick), 10:22. Jets 7–0. **Drive: 3 plays, 43 yards, 1:05.**
- NE – Kevin Faulk 87-yard kickoff return (Adam Vinatieri kick), 9:47. Tied 7–7. **Drive: 0 plays, 0 yards, 0:14.**
- NYJ – Santana Moss 11-yard pass from Chad Pennington (John Hall kick), 3:34. Jets 14–7. **Drive: 5 plays, 74 yards, 2:25.**

**Second quarter**

- NE – Adam Vinatieri 49-yard field goal, 10:20. Jets 14–10. **Drive: 5 plays, 14 yards, 1:41.**
- NYJ – John Hall 39-yard field goal, 4:35. Jets 17–10. **Drive: 12 plays, 50 yards, 5:25.**

**Third quarter**

- NE – Christian Fauria 6-yard pass from Tom Brady (Adam Vinatieri kick), 6:25. Tied 17–17. **Drive: 16 plays, 66 yards, 8:41.**
- NYJ – John Hall 23-yard field goal, 1:54. Jets 20–17. **Drive: 6 plays, 14 yards, 2:10.**

**Fourth quarter**

- NYJ – Wayne Chrebet 15-yard pass from Chad Pennington (John Hall kick), 9:30. Jets 27–17. **Drive: 9 plays, 74 yards, 6:07.**
- NYJ – John Hall 43-yard field goal, 2:36. Jets 30–17. **Drive: 11 plays, 47 yards, 4:55.**

**Top passers**

- NYJ – Chad Pennington – 23/33, 285 yards, 3 TD
- NE – Tom Brady – 19/37, 133 yards, TD, INT

**Top rushers**

- NYJ – Curtis Martin – 26 rushes, 106 yards
- NE – Antowain Smith – 14 rushes, 46 yards

**Top receivers**

- NYJ – Laveranues Coles – 5 receptions, 78 yards, TD
- NE – David Patten – 5 receptions, 38 yards

==== Week 17: vs. Green Bay Packers ====
Week 17: Green Bay Packers (12–3) at New York Jets (8–7) – Game summary

Quarter	1	2	3	4	Total
Packers	0	10	0	7	**17**
**Jets**	0	14	14	14	**42**

at Giants Stadium, East Rutherford, New Jersey

- Date: December 29, 2002
- Game time: 4:15 pm
- Game weather: Cloudy, 40 °F (4 °C)
- Game attendance: 78,733
- Referee: Dick Hantak (105)
- TV announcers (FOX): Dick Stockton, Daryl Johnston, and John DiScepolo
- Recap, Game Book

Game information

**Second quarter**

- NYJ – Richie Anderson 1-yard pass from Chad Pennington (John Hall kick), 14:02. Jets 7–0. **Drive: 10 plays, 84 yards, 5:33.**
- GB – Ryan Longwell 23-yard field goal, 4:26. Jets 7–3. **Drive: 11 plays, 57 yards, 5:31.**
- NYJ – Wayne Chrebet 12-yard pass from Chad Pennington (John Hall kick), 1:46. Jets 14–3. **Drive: 8 plays, 67 yards, 2:42.**
- GB – Terry Glenn 14-yard pass from Brett Favre (Ryan Longwell kick), 0:14. Jets 14–10. **Drive: 10 plays, 76 yards, 1:35.**

**Third quarter**

- NYJ – Curtis Martin 5-yard run (John Hall kick), 11:55. Jets 21–10. **Drive: 6 plays, 60 yards, 3:14.**
- NYJ – Santana Moss 13-yard pass from Chad Pennington (John Hall kick), 7:02. Jets 28–10. **Drive: 7 plays, 76 yards, 3:41.**

**Fourth quarter**

- NYJ – Wayne Chrebet 18-yard pass from Chad Pennington (John Hall kick), 14:53. Jets 35–10. **Drive: 6 plays, 32 yards, 3:25.**
- GB – Bubba Franks 20-yard pass from Doug Pederson (Ryan Longwell kick), 6:05. Jets 35–17. **Drive: 10 plays, 53 yards, 4:55.**
- NYJ – LaMont Jordan 3-yard run (John Hall kick), 2:20. Jets 42–17. **Drive: 6 plays, 28 yards, 3:21.**

**Top passers**

- GB – Brett Favre – 16/33, 172 yards, TD, INT
- NYJ – Chad Pennington – 17/24, 196 yards, 4 TD

**Top rushers**

- GB – Ahman Green – 14 rushes, 67 yards
- NYJ – Curtis Martin – 18 rushes, 83 yards, TD

**Top receivers**

- GB – Terry Glenn – 5 receptions, 76 yards, TD
- NYJ – Laveranues Coles – 6 receptions, 93 yards

As of 2026, this remains the last time the Jets beat the Packers at home.

=== Standings ===
==== Division ====
AFC East
	W	L	T	PCT	DIV	CONF	PF	PA	STK
^{(4)} New York Jets	9	7	0	.563	4–2	6–6	359	336	W2
New England Patriots	9	7	0	.563	4–2	6–6	381	346	W1
Miami Dolphins	9	7	0	.563	2–4	7–5	378	301	L2
Buffalo Bills	8	8	0	.500	2–4	5–7	379	397	W1

==== Conference ====
AFC
#	Team	Division	W	L	T	PCT	DIV	CONF	SOS	SOV
**Division leaders**
1 (Note: Oakland finished ahead of Tennessee based on head-to-head victory.)	Oakland Raiders	West	11	5	0	.688	4–2	9–3	.529	.531
2	Tennessee Titans	South	11	5	0	.688	6–0	9–3	.479	.474
3	Pittsburgh Steelers	North	10	5	1	.656	6–0	8–4	.486	.451
4 (Note: N.Y. Jets finished ahead of New England based on win percentage in common games (8–4 to 7–5) after both finished ahead of Miami based on division record (4–2 to 2–4).)	New York Jets	East	9	7	0	.563	4–2	6–6	.500	.500
**Wild Cards**
5	Indianapolis Colts	South	10	6	0	.625	4–2	8–4	.479	.400
6 (Note: Cleveland finished ahead of Denver and New England based on conference record (7–5 vs 5–7/6–6))	Cleveland Browns	North	9	7	0	.563	3–3	7–5	.486	.413
**Did not qualify for the postseason**
7 (Note: Denver finished ahead of New England based on head-to-head victory.)	Denver Broncos	West	9	7	0	.563	3–3	5–7	.527	.486
8 (Note: New England finished ahead of Miami based on division record (4–2 to 2–4).)	New England Patriots	East	9	7	0	.563	4–2	6–6	.525	.455
9	Miami Dolphins	East	9	7	0	.563	2–4	7–5	.508	.486
10 (Note: Buffalo finished ahead of San Diego based on head-to-head victory.)	Buffalo Bills	East	8	8	0	.500	2–4	5–7	.473	.352
11 (Note: San Diego finished ahead of Kansas City based on division record (3–3 to 2–4).)	San Diego Chargers	West	8	8	0	.500	3–3	6–6	.492	.453
12	Kansas City Chiefs	West	8	8	0	.500	2–4	6–6	.527	.516
13	Baltimore Ravens	North	7	9	0	.438	3–3	7–5	.506	.384
14	Jacksonville Jaguars	South	6	10	0	.375	1–5	4–8	.506	.438
15	Houston Texans	South	4	12	0	.250	1–5	2–10	.518	.492
16	Cincinnati Bengals	North	2	14	0	.125	0–6	1–11	.537	.406
**Tiebreakers** (Note: When breaking ties for three or more teams under the NFL's rules, they are first broken within divisions, then comparing only the highest ranked remaining team from each division.)

== Postseason ==
=== Schedule ===
Round	Date	Opponent (seed)	Result	Record	Venue	Recap
Wild Card	January 4, 2003	Indianapolis Colts (5)	W 41–0	1–0	Giants Stadium	Recap
Divisional	January 12, 2003	at Oakland Raiders (1)	L 10–30	1–1	Network Associates Coliseum	Recap

=== Game summaries ===
==== AFC Wild Card Playoffs: vs. (5) Indianapolis Colts ====
AFC Wild Card Playoffs: (5) Indianapolis Colts at (4) New York Jets – Game summary

Quarter	1	2	3	4	Total
Colts	0	0	0	0	0
Jets	7	17	10	7	41

at Giants Stadium, East Rutherford, New Jersey

- Date: January 4, 2003
- Game time: 4:30 pm
- Game weather: Cloudy, 35 °F (2 °C)
- Game attendance: 78,524
- Referee: Tony Corrente (99)
- TV announcers (ABC): Brent Musburger and Gary Danielson
- Recap, Game Book

Game information

First quarter

- NYJ – Richie Anderson 56-yard pass from Chad Pennington (John Hall kick), 10:50. Jets 7–0. Drive: 5 plays, 77 yards, 2:27.

Second quarter

- NYJ – John Hall 41-yard field goal, 14:08. Jets 10–0. Drive: 9 plays, 46 yards, 5:34.
- NYJ – LaMont Jordan 1-yard run (John Hall kick), 9:41. Jets 17–0. Drive: 7 plays, 39 yards, 4:18.
- NYJ – Santana Moss 4-yard pass from Chad Pennington (John Hall kick), 0:37. Jets 24–0. Drive: 6 plays, 42 yards, 1:02.

Third quarter

- NYJ – John Hall 39-yard field goal, 13:28. Jets 27–0. Drive: 4 plays, −1 yard, 1:32.
- NYJ – Chris Baker 3-yard pass from Chad Pennington (John Hall kick), 1:44. Jets 34–0. Drive: 11 plays, 74 yards, 6:30.

Fourth quarter

- NYJ – LaMont Jordan 1-yard run (John Hall kick), 4:59. Jets 41–0. Drive: 13 plays, 64 yards, 9:17.

Top passers

- IND – Peyton Manning – 14/31, 137 yards, 2 INT
- NYJ – Chad Pennington – 19/25, 222 yards, 3 TD

Top rushers

- IND – James Mungro – 4 rushes, 36 yards
- NYJ – LaMont Jordan – 20 rushes, 102 yards, 2 TD

Top receivers

- IND – Marvin Harrison – 4 receptions, 47 yards
- NYJ – Richie Anderson – 2 receptions, 66 yards, TD

This game turned out to be the Jets' last home playoff game at Giants Stadium, and as of 2024, it is also their last home playoff game to date.

==== AFC Divisional Playoffs: at (1) Oakland Raiders ====
AFC Divisional Playoffs: (4) New York Jets at (1) Oakland Raiders – Game summary

Quarter	1	2	3	4	Total
Jets	3	7	0	0	10
Raiders	3	7	7	13	30

at Network Associates Coliseum, Oakland, California

- Date: January 12, 2003
- Game time: 4:30 pm
- Game weather: Overcast, 61 °F (16 °C)
- Game attendance: 62,207
- Referee: Dick Hantak (105)
- TV announcers (CBS): Greg Gumbel, Phil Simms and Armen Keteyian
- Recap, Game Book

Game information

First quarter

- NYJ – John Hall 38-yard field goal, 11:07. Jets 3–0. Drive: 8 plays, 45 yards, 4:02.
- OAK – Sebastian Janikowski 29-yard field goal, 6:12. Tied 3–3. Drive: 9 plays, 53 yards, 5:10.

Second quarter

- OAK – Zack Crockett 1-yard run (Sebastian Janikowski kick), 13:49. Raiders 10–3. Drive: 6 plays, 27 yards, 2:41.
- NYJ – Jerald Sowell 1-yard pass from Chad Pennington (John Hall kick), 0:37. Tied 10–10. Drive: 16 plays, 81 yards, 7:46.

Third quarter

- OAK – Jerry Porter 29-yard pass from Rich Gannon (Sebastian Janikowski kick), 4:30. Raiders 17–10. Drive: 2 plays, 45 yards, 0:30.

Fourth quarter

- OAK – Jerry Rice 9-yard pass from Rich Gannon (Sebastian Janikowski kick), 14:50. Raiders 24–10. Drive: 4 plays, 65 yards, 2:03.
- OAK – Sebastian Janikowski 34-yard field goal, 8:07. Raiders 27–10. Drive: 7 plays, 46 yards, 3:27.
- OAK – Sebastian Janikowski 31-yard field goal, 3:00. Raiders 30–10. Drive: 8 plays, 37 yards, 4:28.

Top passers

- NYJ – Chad Pennington – 21/47, 183 yards, TD, 2 INT
- OAK – Rich Gannon – 20/30, 283 yards, 2 TD, INT

Top rushers

- NYJ – Curtis Martin – 16 rushes, 74 yards
- OAK – Charlie Garner – 21 rushes, 93 yards

Top receivers

- NYJ – Santana Moss – 4 receptions, 45 yards
- OAK – Jerry Porter – 6 receptions, 123 yards, TD
