= 2001 New York Jets season =

2001 season of NFL team New York Jets

- Owner: Woody & Christopher Johnson
- Head coach: Herman Edwards
- Offensive coordinator: Paul Hackett
- Defensive coordinator: Ted Cottrell
- Home stadium: The Meadowlands

Results
- Record: 10–6
- Division place: 3rd AFC East
- Playoffs: Lost Wild Card Playoffs (at Raiders) 24–38
- Pro Bowlers: C Kevin Mawae; RB Curtis Martin; DE John Abraham

Uniform
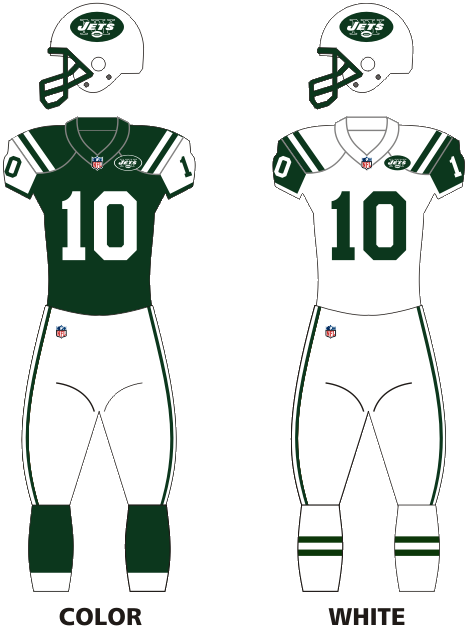

The 2001 New York Jets season was the franchise's 32nd season in the National Football League (NFL), the 42nd season overall, and the first under new head coach Herman Edwards. The team improved upon its 9–7 record from 2000 and the Jets finished 10–6 and qualified for the final Wild Card position in the American Football Conference (AFC), their first playoff berth since 1998. They lost in the wild-card round to the Oakland Raiders, with the score of 38–24.

== Offseason ==
Additions	Subtractions
FS Damien Robinson (Buccaneers)	QB Ray Lucas (Dolphins)
LB James Darling (Eagles)	WR Dedric Ward (Dolphins)
LB Doug Colman (Browns)	LB Bryan Cox (Patriots)
	LB Roman Phifer (Patriots)
	LS Bradford Banta (Lions)
	RB Leon Johnson (Bears)
	TE Fred Baxter (Bears)

=== NFL draft ===
2001 New York Jets draft
Round	Pick	Player	Position	College	Notes
1	16	Santana Moss *	WR	Miami (FL)	from Pittsburgh
2	49	LaMont Jordan	RB	Maryland	
3	79	Kareem McKenzie	OT	Penn State	
4	101	Jamie Henderson	CB	Georgia	from New England
7	206	James Reed	DT	Iowa State	from New England
7	217	Tupe Peko	OG	Michigan State	
Made roster * Made at least one Pro Bowl during career

=== Undrafted free agents ===
2001 undrafted free agents of note
Player	Position	College
Matt Bonito	Guard	Michigan State
Matt Comella	Fullback	Northeastern
Tory Woodbury	Quarterback	Winston-Salem State

== Staff ==
2001 New York Jets staff
Front office: Owner – Woody Johnson; Salary cap analyst/pro personnel assistant – Dawn Aponte; Head coaches: Head coach – Herman Edwards; Offensive coaches: Offensive coordinator – Paul Hackett; Running backs – Bishop Harris; Wide receivers – Mose Rison; Tight ends – Phil Pettey; Offensive line – Bill Muir; Offensive assistant – Eric Price; Offensive quality control – Mike Henning	Defensive coaches: Defensive coordinator – Ted Cottrell; Linebackers – Bob Sutton; Defensive backs – Bill Bradley; Defensive assistant/linebackers – Dave Merritt; Special teams coaches: Special teams coordinator – Mike Westhoff; Special teams – Al Roberts; Strength and conditioning: Strength and conditioning – John Lott; Assistant strength and conditioning – Lou Hernandez; Strength assistant – Sal Alosi

== Roster ==
2001 New York Jets roster
Quarterbacks (QB): 10 Chad Pennington; 16 Vinny Testaverde; 11 Tory Woodbury; Running backs (RB): 20 Richie Anderson FB; 34 LaMont Jordan; 28 Curtis Martin; 26 Chad Morton; 33 Jerald Sowell; Wide receivers (WR): 80 Wayne Chrebet; 87 Laveranues Coles; 81 Matthew Hatchette; 83 Santana Moss; 82 Kevin Swayne; 84 Craig Yeast; Tight ends (TE): 88 Anthony Becht; 85 James Dearth LS; 86 Daniel Wilcox	Offensive linemen (OL): 69 Jason Fabini T; 65 Dan Goodspeed T; 71 Kerry Jenkins G; 79 David Loverne G; 63 J. P. Machado C/G; 68 Kevin Mawae C; 67 Kareem McKenzie T; 77 Randy Thomas G; 74 Ryan Young T; Defensive linemen (DL): 94 John Abraham DE; 98 Shane Burton DT; 92 Shaun Ellis DE; 96 Riley Kleinhesselink DE; 95 Rick Lyle DE; 91 Steve Martin DT; 97 Giradie Mercer DT; 99 Eric Ogbogu DE; 93 James Reed DT	Linebackers (LB): 51 James Darling OLB; 58 James Farrior OLB; 56 Jason Glenn OLB; 55 Marvin Jones MLB; 57 Mo Lewis OLB; 50 Kelvin Moses MLB; Defensive backs (DB): 42 Marcus Coleman CB; 25 Nick Ferguson FS/SS; 31 Aaron Glenn CB; 21 Victor Green SS; 30 Chris Hayes FS/SS; 23 Jamie Henderson CB; 24 Ray Mickens CB; 22 Damien Robinson FS; 38 James Rooths CB/S; 27 Tony Scott CB; Special teams (ST): 9 John Hall K; 7 Tom Tupa P	Practice squad: 2 Corey Alston WR; 32 Marlion Jackson RB; 60 Dennis O'Sullivan C; 62 Josh Rawlings T; 36 Ryan Szokola S; Reserve: 72 Jason Ferguson DT (IR); 66 David Viger G (Military); Rookies in italics 53 active, 2 reserve, 5 practice squad

== Schedule ==
=== Regular season ===
In the wake of the September 11 attacks, the Jets’ players made a unanimous vote not to play against the Oakland Raiders in Week 2. This game was made up on January 6, 2002.

Week	Date	Opponent	Result	Record	Venue	Recap
1	September 9	**Indianapolis Colts**	**L** 24–45	0–1	Giants Stadium	Recap
2	September 23	at **New England Patriots**	**W** 10–3	1–1	Foxboro Stadium	Recap
3	October 1	San Francisco 49ers	**L** 17–19	1–2	Giants Stadium	Recap
4	October 7	at **Buffalo Bills**	**W** 42–36	2–2	Ralph Wilson Stadium	Recap
5	October 14	**Miami Dolphins**	**W** 21–17	3–2	Giants Stadium	Recap
6	October 21	St. Louis Rams	**L** 14–34	3–3	Giants Stadium	Recap
7	October 28	at Carolina Panthers	**W** 13–12	4–3	Ericsson Stadium	Recap
8	November 4	at New Orleans Saints	**W** 16–9	5–3	Louisiana Superdome	Recap
9	November 11	Kansas City Chiefs	**W** 27–7	6–3	Giants Stadium	Recap
10	November 18	at **Miami Dolphins**	**W** 24–0	7–3	Pro Player Stadium	Recap
11	Bye					
12	December 2	**New England Patriots**	**L** 16–17	7–4	Giants Stadium	Recap
13	December 9	at Pittsburgh Steelers	**L** 7–18	7–5	Heinz Field	Recap
14	December 16	Cincinnati Bengals	**W** 15–14	8–5	Giants Stadium	Recap
15	December 23	at **Indianapolis Colts**	**W** 29–28	9–5	RCA Dome	Recap
16	December 30	**Buffalo Bills**	**L** 9–14	9–6	Giants Stadium	Recap
17	January 6	at Oakland Raiders	**W** 24–22	10–6	Network Associates Coliseum	Recap
Note: Intra-divisional opponents are in bold text

=== Postseason ===
Round	Date	Opponent (seed)	Result	Record	Venue	Recap
Wild Card	January 12, 2002	at Oakland Raiders (3)	**L** 24–38	0–1	Network Associates Coliseum	Recap

=== Game summaries ===
==== Week 2: at New England Patriots ====
Week 2: New York Jets at New England Patriots – Game summary

Quarter	1	2	3	4	Total
**Jets**	0	3	7	0	**10**
Patriots	3	0	0	0	**3**

at Foxboro Stadium, Foxborough, Massachusetts

- Date: September 23
- Game time: 4:15 p.m. EDT
- Game weather: Partly cloudy, 74 °F (23 °C)
- Game attendance: 60,292
- Referee: Larry Nemmers
- TV announcers (CBS): Dick Enberg, Dan Dierdorf & Bonnie Bernstein

Game information

**First quarter**

- NE – Adam Vinatieri 24-yard field goal, 0:52. Patriots 3–0. **Drive: 15 plays, 64 yards, 8:41.**

**Second quarter**

- NYJ – John Hall 26-yard field goal, 0:00. Tied 3–3. **Drive: 13 plays, 89 yards, 6:26.**

**Third quarter**

- NYJ – Curtis Martin 8-yard run (John Hall kick), 2:29. Jets 10–3. **Drive: 12 plays, 93 yards, 6:08.**

**Fourth quarter**

- No scoring plays

**Top passers**

- NYJ – Vinny Testaverde – 16/28, 137 yards
- NE – Drew Bledsoe – 18/28, 159 yards, 2 INT

**Top rushers**

- NYJ – Curtis Martin – 24 rushes, 106 yards, TD
- NE – Marc Edwards – 6 rushes, 31 yards

**Top receivers**

- NYJ – Wayne Chrebet – 5 receptions, 53 yards
- NE – Troy Brown – 5 receptions, 82 yards

==== Week 9: vs Kansas City Chiefs ====
Week 9: Kansas City Chiefs at New York Jets – Game summary

Quarter	1	2	3	4	Total
Chiefs	0	0	0	7	**7**
**Jets**	0	14	13	0	**27**

at Giants Stadium, East Rutherford, New Jersey

- Date: November 11
- Game time: 1:00 p.m. EST/12:00 p.m. CST
- Game weather: Sunny, 48 °F (9 °C)
- Game attendance: 78,234
- Referee: Tom White
- TV announcers (CBS): Kevin Harlan, Craig James and Beasley Reece
- Recap, Game Book

Game information

**First quarter**

- No scoring plays.

**Second quarter**

- NYJ – Curtis Martin 1-yard run (John Hall kick), 8:40. Jets 7–0. **Drive: 13 plays, 96 yards, 7:32.**
- NYJ – Curtis Martin 25-yard run (John Hall kick), 0:24. Jets 14–0. **Drive: 5 plays, 48 yards, 1:08.**

**Third quarter**

- NYJ – John Hall 51-yard field goal, 12:09. Jets 17–0. **Drive: 7 plays, 30 yards, 2:51.**
- NYJ – Curtis Martin 5-yard run (John Hall kick), 6:40. Jets 24–0. **Drive: 6 plays, 65 yards, 3:27.**
- NYJ – John Hall 31-yard field goal, 2:06. Jets 27–0. **Drive: 4 plays, 7 yards, 2:13.**

**Fourth quarter**

- KC – Tony Gonzalez 26-yard pass from Trent Green (Todd Peterson kick), 9:14. Jets 27–7. **Drive: 8 plays, 38 yards, 4:12.**

**Top passers**

- KC – Trent Green – 16/31, 143 yards, TD, 3 INT
- NYJ – Vinny Testaverde – 15/27, 221 yards, INT

**Top rushers**

- KC – Priest Holmes – 18 rushes, 71 yards
- NYJ – Curtis Martin – 20 rushes, 113 yards, 3 TD

**Top receivers**

- KC – Chris Thomas – 3 receptions, 48 yards
- NYJ – Wayne Chrebet – 6 receptions, 67 yards

== Standings ==
AFC East
	W	L	T	PCT	PF	PA	STK
^{(2)} New England Patriots	11	5	0	.688	371	272	W6
^{(4)} Miami Dolphins	11	5	0	.688	344	290	W2
^{(6)} New York Jets	10	6	0	.625	308	295	W1
Indianapolis Colts	6	10	0	.375	413	486	W1
Buffalo Bills	3	13	0	.188	265	420	L1
