= 1999 New York Jets season =

1999 season of NFL team New York Jets; 40th season in franchise history

- Owner: Estate of Leon Hess
- Head coach: Bill Parcells
- Offensive coordinator: Charlie Weis
- Defensive coordinator: Bill Belichick
- Home stadium: Giants Stadium

Results
- Record: 8–8
- Division place: T-4th AFC East
- Playoffs: Did not qualify
- Pro Bowlers: C Kevin Mawae; WR Keyshawn Johnson; LB Mo Lewis; P Tom Tupa

Uniform
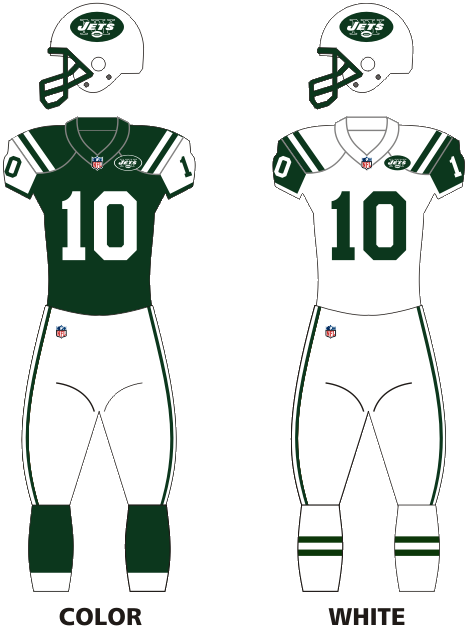

The 1999 New York Jets season was the 40th season for the team, the 30th in the National Football League (NFL) and the third year and final year under Bill Parcells and was also the last season that the Jets were under the ownership of the Hess family. Owner Leon Hess died before the season began and, per his directive, the team was to be sold after his death. The process for vetting potential buyers proceeded during the entire season and shortly after it concluded, the winning buyer was revealed as Johnson & Johnson heir Woody Johnson.

The Jets failed to improve upon their 12–4 record from 1998, when the Jets won the AFC East and ended the season with a loss in the AFC Championship Game and missed the playoffs for the first time since 1997. The team dealt with several devastating injuries to starters. Starting quarterback Vinny Testaverde suffered a ruptured Achilles tendon in the season opener against the New England Patriots, costing him the entire season. Starting running back Leon Johnson tore two knee ligaments in the same game and was also lost for the season.

Due to Testaverde’s injury, the Jets were forced to use three different quarterbacks during the season. Parcells used punter Tom Tupa, who had begun his career as a quarterback, to replace Testaverde in the opening game against the Patriots but pulled him in favor of Rick Mirer. Parcells acquired Mirer in a trade with the Green Bay Packers during the offseason and made room for Mirer by trading Glenn Foley to the Seattle Seahawks. After a 2–6 start to the season, Parcells went in another direction and replaced Mirer with third-stringer Ray Lucas, who won six of his eight starts to bring the team to an 8–8 finish.

Parcells announced his retirement shortly after the 1999 season concluded and announced that defensive coordinator Bill Belichick, who had been his designated successor, would take over. However, Belichick decided shortly after taking the position that he no longer wanted it and instead chose to become the head coach of the Patriots after they had parted with head coach Pete Carroll. Thus, Parcells promoted linebackers coach Al Groh to replace him while he stayed on for an additional year in the front office.

== Offseason ==
=== NFL draft ===
1999 New York Jets draft
Round	Pick	Player	Position	College	Notes
2	57	Randy Thomas	Guard	Mississippi State	
3	90	David Loverne	Guard	San Jose State	
4	123	Jason Wiltz	Defensive tackle	Nebraska	
5	162	Jermaine Jones	Cornerback	Northwestern State	
6	183	Marc Megna	Linebacker	Richmond	
6	197	J. P. Machado	Center	Illinois	
7	235	J. J. Syvrud	Linebacker	Jamestown	
Made roster

== Roster ==
1999 New York Jets roster
Quarterbacks (QB): 6 Ray Lucas; 3 Rick Mirer; Running backs (RB): 20 Richie Anderson FB; 25 Robert Farmer; 28 Curtis Martin; 34 Bernie Parmalee; 33 Jerald Sowell FB; Wide receivers (WR): 80 Wayne Chrebet; 88 Quinn Early; 19 Keyshawn Johnson; 83 Dwight Stone KR; 89 Dedric Ward PR; Tight ends (TE): 84 Fred Baxter; 82 Blake Spence	Offensive linemen (OL): 76 Jumbo Elliott T; 67 Mike Gisler C/G; 71 Kerry Jenkins G; 79 David Loverne G; 63 J. P. Machado G; 73 Siupeli Malamala T; 68 Kevin Mawae C; 60 Dennis O'Sullivan C; 75 Ian Rafferty T; 77 Randy Thomas G; 74 Ryan Young T; Defensive linemen (DL): 97 Dorian Boose DE; 72 Jason Ferguson NT; 92 Bobby Hamilton DE; 93 Ernie Logan NT; 95 Rick Lyle DE; 99 Eric Ogbogu DE; 98 Anthony Pleasant DE; 91 Jason Wiltz NT	Linebackers (LB): 94 Casey Dailey OLB; 58 James Farrior OLB; 54 Dwayne Gordon ILB; 55 Marvin Jones ILB; 57 Mo Lewis OLB; 56 Roman Phifer OLB; 50 J. J. Syvrud ILB; Defensive backs (DB): 27 Steve Atwater FS; 42 Marcus Coleman CB; 36 Buddy Crutchfield CB; 47 Scott Frost FS; 31 Aaron Glenn CB/KR; 21 Victor Green SS; 30 Chris Hayes SS; 38 Delphfrine Lee CB; 24 Ray Mickens CB; 26 Omar Stoutmire FS; Special teams (ST): 9 John Hall K; 65 John Hudson LS; 7 Tom Tupa P/QB	Practice squad: 87 Fred Coleman WR; 11 Jim Kubiak QB; 62 Greg Lotyscz T; 85 Jermaine Wiggins TE; Reserve: 53 Chad Cascadden LB (IR); 51 Bryan Cox LB (IR); 69 Jason Fabini T (IR); 86 Eric Green TE (IR); 32 Leon Johnson RB/KR/PR (IR); 45 Otis Smith CB (IR); 16 Vinny Testaverde QB (IR); 66 David Viger G (Military); 23 Kevin Williams CB/KR (NF-Ill.); Rookies in italics 53 active, 9 reserve, 4 practice squad

== Schedule ==
Week	Date	Opponent	Result	Record	Venue	Recap
1	September 12	**New England Patriots**	**L** 28–30	0–1	Giants Stadium	Recap
2	September 19	at **Buffalo Bills**	**L** 3–17	0–2	Ralph Wilson Stadium	Recap
3	September 26	Washington Redskins	**L** 20–27	0–3	Giants Stadium	Recap
4	October 3	at Denver Broncos	**W** 21–13	1–3	Mile High Stadium	Recap
5	October 11	Jacksonville Jaguars	**L** 6–16	1–4	Giants Stadium	Recap
6	October 17	**Indianapolis Colts**	**L** 13–16	1–5	Giants Stadium	Recap
7	October 24	at Oakland Raiders	**L** 23–24	1–6	Network Associates Coliseum	Recap
8	Bye					
9	November 7	Arizona Cardinals	**W** 12–7	2–6	Giants Stadium	Recap
10	November 15	at **New England Patriots**	**W** 24–17	3–6	Foxboro Stadium	Recap
11	November 21	**Buffalo Bills**	**W** 17–7	4–6	Giants Stadium	Recap
12	November 28	at **Indianapolis Colts**	**L** 6–13	4–7	RCA Dome	Recap
13	December 5	at New York Giants	**L** 28–41	4–8	Giants Stadium	Recap
14	December 12	**Miami Dolphins**	**W** 28–20	5–8	Giants Stadium	Recap
15	December 19	at Dallas Cowboys	**W** 22–21	6–8	Texas Stadium	Recap
16	December 27	at **Miami Dolphins**	**W** 38–31	7–8	Pro Player Stadium	Recap
17	January 2	Seattle Seahawks	**W** 19–9	8–8	Giants Stadium	Recap
Note: Intra-division opponents are in **bold** text.

== Standings ==
AFC East
	W	L	T	PCT	PF	PA	STK
^{(2)} Indianapolis Colts	13	3	0	.813	423	333	L1
^{(5)} Buffalo Bills	11	5	0	.688	320	229	W3
^{(6)} Miami Dolphins	9	7	0	.563	326	336	L2
New York Jets	8	8	0	.500	308	309	W4
New England Patriots	8	8	0	.500	299	284	W1
