= Damien Robinson =

American football player (born 1973)

No. 24, 22
- Position: Safety

Personal information
- Born: December 22, 1973 (age 52); Dallas, Texas, U.S.
- Listed height: 6 ft 2 in (1.88 m)
- Listed weight: 223 lb (101 kg)

Career information
- High school: Hillcrest (Dallas)
- College: Iowa
- NFL draft: 1997: 4th round, 119th overall pick

Career history
- Philadelphia Eagles (1997)*; Tampa Bay Buccaneers (1997–2000); New York Jets (2001–2002); Seattle Seahawks (2003–2004)
- * Offseason or practice squad member only

Awards and highlights
- First-team All-Big Ten (1996)

Career NFL statistics
- Tackles: 320
- Interceptions: 13
- Fumble recoveries: 7
- Stats at Pro Football Reference

Damien Robinson (born December 22, 1973) is an American former professional football player who was a safety in the National Football League (NFL). He played for the Tampa Bay Buccaneers, New York Jets, and Seattle Seahawks. He played college football for the Iowa Hawkeyes.

== Professional career ==
=== Philadelphia Eagles ===
The Eagles selected Robinson in the fourth round of the 1997 NFL draft.

=== Tampa Bay Buccaneers ===
On September 18, 1997, the Buccaneers signed Robinson off of the Eagles practice squad. During the 2000 NFL season, Robinson was one of the league's leading Free Safeties with 6 interceptions and 11 passes defended. Robinson was the starting free safety for the Tampa Bay Buccaneers. The number one defense in the NFL known for the Tampa 2 defense. Robinson was known for his ball hawking and hard hitting skills.

=== New York Jets ===
Robinson signed to the N.Y. Jets in 2001 as one of the top free agents on the market. Robinson is best known for the November 4, 2001 event at the Louisiana Superdome. His Jets were leading the New Orleans Saints, 16–9, late in the ball game. After a routine offensive play, Robinson grabbed the face mask of Saints quarterback Aaron Brooks and continually pulled at the mask, bending Brooks backwards and twisting his neck. Saints offensive lineman Kyle Turley was furious, and attacked Robinson. There was a team scuffle as referees and players from both teams tried to separate them. Robinson knocked Turley's helmet off. Turley emerged from the ensuing scrum with Robinson's helmet and flung it across the field before making an obscene gesture. Turley later was fined $20,000 by the NFL for his actions. Robinson stayed in the game which was subsequently won by the Jets.

=== Seattle Seahawks ===
On March 11, 2003, Robinson signed a multi-year contract with the Seahawks. In 2003, he played in 15 games, starting 4. He spent the 2004 season on injured reserve with a shoulder injury. On March 3, 2005, he was released from his contract.

== NFL career statistics ==
Legend
**Bold**	Career high

=== Regular season ===
Year	Team	Games		Tackles				Interceptions				Fumbles			
Year	Team	GP	GS	Comb	Solo	Ast	Sck	Int	Yds	TD	Lng	FF	FR	Yds	TD
1998	TAM	7	0	12	6	6	0.0	0	0	0	0	0	0	0	0
1999	TAM	16	16	**73**	52	**21**	**0.5**	2	36	0	**36**	0	2	0	0
2000	TAM	16	16	71	51	20	0.0	**6**	1	0	1	0	**3**	**5**	0
2001	NYJ	14	14	56	38	18	0.0	2	**58**	0	30	0	1	4	0
2002	NYJ	15	15	**73**	**55**	18	0.0	2	12	0	12	0	0	0	0
2003	SEA	15	4	35	31	4	0.0	1	26	0	26	0	1	3	0
		83	65	320	233	87	0.5	13	133	0	36	0	7	12	0

=== Playoffs ===
Year	Team	Games		Tackles				Interceptions				Fumbles			
Year	Team	GP	GS	Comb	Solo	Ast	Sck	Int	Yds	TD	Lng	FF	FR	Yds	TD
1999	TAM	2	2	5	5	0	0.0	0	0	0	0	0	0	0	0
2000	TAM	1	1	4	3	**1**	0.0	0	0	0	0	0	0	0	0
2001	NYJ	1	1	6	5	**1**	0.0	0	0	0	0	0	0	0	0
2002	NYJ	2	2	5	4	**1**	0.0	**2**	**24**	0	**24**	0	0	0	0
2003	SEA	1	1	**9**	**9**	0	0.0	0	0	0	0	0	0	0	0
		7	7	29	26	3	0.0	2	24	0	24	0	0	0	0
