= James Reed (defensive tackle) =

American football player (born 1977)

No. 93, 92
- Position: Defensive tackle

Personal information
- Born: February 3, 1977 (age 49); Saginaw, Michigan, U.S.
- Listed height: 6 ft 0 in (1.83 m)
- Listed weight: 286 lb (130 kg)

Career information
- High school: Saginaw
- College: Iowa State
- NFL draft: 2001: 7th round, 206th overall pick

Career history
- New York Jets (2001–2005); Kansas City Chiefs (2006–2007); New Orleans Saints (2008)

Career NFL statistics
- Total tackles: 230
- Sacks: 7
- Fumble recoveries: 4
- Pass deflections: 4
- Defensive touchdowns: 1
- Stats at Pro Football Reference

James Reed (born February 3, 1977) is an American former professional football player who was a defensive tackle in the National Football League (NFL). He played college football for the Iowa State Cyclones and was selected by the New York Jets in the seventh round of the 2001 NFL draft.

Reed has also played for the Kansas City Chiefs and New Orleans Saints.

== Early life ==
James Reed went to Saginaw High School in Saginaw, Michigan. He played offensive tackle as a junior and started at middle linebacker as a senior. Reed played for some outstanding high school football teams at Saginaw High School. His junior year marked the first winning record for the Trojans in five years. He also helped the Trojans win the school's first Saginaw Valley League title in 1996, since 1951. Reed, a 6-foot, 240-pound linebacker for the Trojans, received All-State and All-State honors his senior year in 1996 after recording 117 tackles ,10 sacks, and two interceptions.

Reed was inducted into the Saginaw County Sports Hall Of Fame in 2014.

== College career ==
Reed attended Iowa State University, and was a three-year starter and a three-time All-Big 12 conference selection. He helped get the Cyclones their first bowl win ever.

== Professional career ==
=== Kansas City Chiefs ===
On April 17, 2007, Reed was re-signed to the Chiefs with a three-year contract. He only played out one year of the contract after the Chiefs released him on February 27, 2008.

=== New Orleans Saints ===
On August 4, 2008, Reed was signed by the New Orleans Saints. Reed was placed on the injured reserve after he tore his Achilles tendon in training camp.

== NFL career statistics ==
Legend
**Bold**	Career high

=== Regular season ===
Year	Team	Games		Tackles					Interceptions					Fumbles			
Year	Team	GP	GS	Cmb	Solo	Ast	Sck	TFL	Int	Yds	TD	Lng	PD	FF	FR	Yds	TD
2001	NYJ	**16**	2	45	32	13	1.0	2	0	0	0	0	1	0	1	0	0
2002	NYJ	**16**	0	24	17	7	0.0	2	0	0	0	0	1	0	0	0	0
2003	NYJ	**16**	0	37	23	14	1.0	1	0	0	0	0	0	0	1	16	0
2004	NYJ	**16**	0	19	13	6	**2.0**	3	0	0	0	0	0	0	0	0	0
2005	NYJ	**16**	**15**	**65**	**44**	**21**	**2.0**	**7**	0	0	0	0	0	0	**2**	**33**	**1**
2006	KAN	15	**15**	37	30	7	1.0	3	0	0	0	0	**2**	0	0	0	0
2007	KAN	4	0	3	3	0	0.0	1	0	0	0	0	0	0	0	0	0
		99	32	230	162	68	7.0	19	0	0	0	0	4	0	4	49	1

=== Playoffs ===
Year	Team	Games		Tackles					Interceptions					Fumbles			
Year	Team	GP	GS	Cmb	Solo	Ast	Sck	TFL	Int	Yds	TD	Lng	PD	FF	FR	Yds	TD
2001	NYJ	1	0	1	1	0	0.0	0	0	0	0	0	0	0	0	0	0
2002	NYJ	**2**	0	0	0	0	0.0	0	0	0	0	0	0	0	0	0	0
2004	NYJ	**2**	0	1	0	**1**	0.0	0	0	0	0	0	0	0	0	0	0
2006	KAN	1	**1**	**6**	**5**	**1**	0.0	**1**	0	0	0	0	0	0	0	0	0
		6	1	8	6	2	0.0	1	0	0	0	0	0	0	0	0	0
