= Wayne Chrebet =

American football player (born 1973)

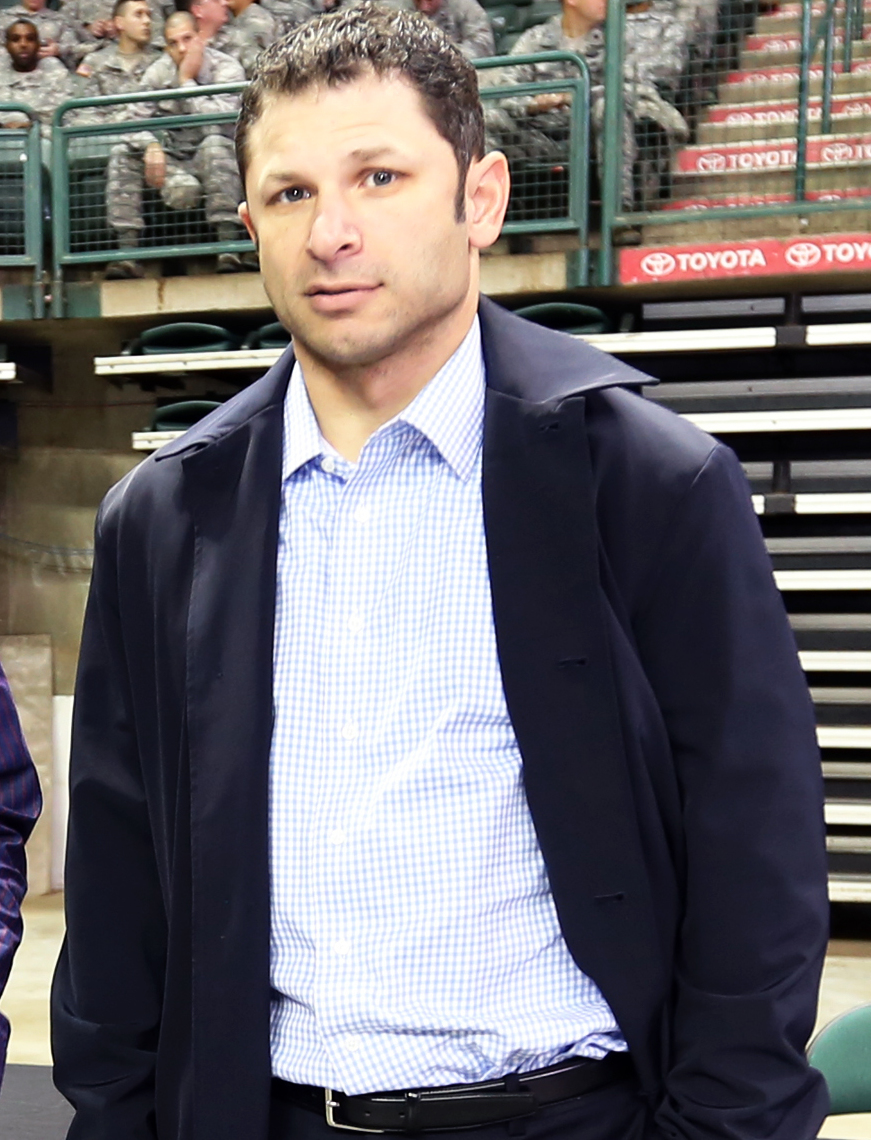
- Chrebet in 2014

No. 80
- Position: Wide receiver

Personal information
- Born: August 14, 1973 (age 53); Garfield, New Jersey, U.S.
- Listed height: 5 ft 10 in (1.78 m)
- Listed weight: 188 lb (85 kg)

Career information
- High school: Garfield
- College: Hofstra (1991–1994)
- NFL draft: 1995: undrafted

Career history
- New York Jets (1995–2005)

Awards and highlights
- New York Jets Ring of Honor; Hofstra Pride No. 3 retired

Career NFL statistics
- Receptions: 580
- Receiving yards: 7,365
- Receiving touchdowns: 41
- Stats at Pro Football Reference

Wayne John Chrebet Jr. (born August 14, 1973) is an American former professional football player who was a wide receiver for 11 seasons with the New York Jets of the National Football League (NFL) from 1995 to 2005. He played college football for the Hofstra Pride.

== High school and college career ==
Chrebet grew up in Garfield, New Jersey in heavily suburban Bergen County. He played high school football at Garfield High School.

After graduating from Garfield, Chrebet remained in the tri-state area, attending Hofstra University on Long Island. Chrebet enjoyed a very productive college football career. Playing from 1991 to 1994, he set several school records, which include the single-game receiving yards record (245), touchdowns in a game (five), season (16) and career (31). A four-year letter-winner, he twice led Hofstra in receiving yards, and during his 1994 Senior season he became the first player in school history to amass 1,000 receiving yards in a single season. He also etched his name in the NCAA Division I-AA record book by scoring five receiving touchdowns in a single game, tying a record held by NFL Hall of Famer Jerry Rice.

Hofstra has honored Chrebet for his outstanding college career. He was inducted into the Hofstra University Athletic Hall of Fame in 2006 as part of its inaugural class, and his jersey #3 was retired.

== NFL career ==
Despite his collegiate success, Chrebet was not regarded as an NFL prospect. At 5 feet 10 inches (1.78 m) and 188 pounds (85 kg), he was deemed too small for the NFL and went undrafted in the 1995 NFL draft.

Chrebet did get a tryout with the Baltimore Stallions of the Canadian Football League, but he was cut after one day.

Chrebet's big break came when he was granted a walk-on opportunity with the NFL's New York Jets, which at the time trained at Hofstra's campus.

Chrebet entered training camp 11th of 11 on the Jets' wide receiver depth chart. Since NFL teams generally retained about five receivers on their regular season roster at the time, Chrebet was not expected to make the team.

While Chrebet was so small that a team security guard prevented him from entering the front gate on his first day of training camp, Chrebet did make the Jets’ final 53-man roster. In so doing, he became the first Hofstra alumnus to make an NFL team in three decades.

During his rookie season, on December 3, 1995, Chrebet pulled in 8 receptions in a game against the St. Louis Rams. During a scoring play, Chrebet broke several tackles as he scrambled toward the goal line.

The following season, on October 19, 1996, Chrebet hauled in 12 receptions for 162 yards against Jacksonville. Five of the receptions led to third-down conversions. Overall during his career, 379 of his 580 receptions led to successful third down conversions. This led to Chrebet's primary nickname, "Mr. Third Down.”

On September 24, 2000, Chrebet caught an 18-yard TD pass from Curtis Martin with 52 seconds left to give the Jets a 21–17 victory against the Tampa Bay Buccaneers, which resulted in the New York media nicknaming him "The Green Lantern."

Some consider Chrebet's best overall game as the October 10, 2004 contest with the Buffalo Bills in which he caught all 8 passes sent his way from quarterback Chad Pennington in a 16–14 victory.

In a November 6, 2005 game against the San Diego Chargers, Chrebet sustained a serious concussion on a clean play. Despite being knocked unconscious for several minutes, Chrebet still made a third-down catch for a first down, symbolic of the type of plays he made throughout his career. After the concussion, he was placed on injured reserve, ending his season. After being told that he risked brain damage if he suffered another concussion, Chrebet announced his retirement on June 2, 2006.

== Legacy ==
At the time of his retirement, his 580 receptions were the second-most in franchise history, behind only wide receiver Don Maynard (NY Titans / NY Jets). His 7,365 yards from scrimmage were fifth in franchise history.

During his 11-year career with the Jets, he caught passes from 13 different quarterbacks, played for four different head coaches, and worked for two different owners.

Chrebet was formally honored by the New York Jets on "Wayne Chrebet Day" during halftime of the September 23, 2007 game against the Miami Dolphins.

Chrebet wore #80 for his entire 11-season career as a Jet. The Jets have not reissued the number since he retired, and it is generally understood that no Jet will wear that number again in the foreseeable future. He was formally inducted into the New York Jets Ring of Honor during halftime of the Monday December 1, 2014 game against the Miami Dolphins.

Chrebet's career history was named one of the greatest rags-to-riches stories in the history of professional sports by Sports Illustrated later that year.

Because of his size and success, Chrebet became a popular sensation. While still playing, he was featured on cereal boxes.

== NFL career statistics ==
Year	Team	Games		Receiving					Fumbles	
Year	Team	GP	GS	Rec	Yds	Avg	Lng	TD	Fum	Lost
1995	NYJ	16	16	66	726	11.0	32	4	1	1
1996	NYJ	16	9	84	909	10.8	44	3	5	3
1997	NYJ	16	1	58	799	13.8	70	3	0	0
1998	NYJ	16	15	75	1,083	14.4	63T	8	0	0
1999	NYJ	11	11	48	631	13.1	50T	3	0	0
2000	NYJ	16	16	69	937	13.6	50	8	0	0
2001	NYJ	15	15	56	750	13.4	36	1	0	0
2002	NYJ	15	15	51	691	13.5	37	9	2	2
2003	NYJ	7	5	27	289	10.7	29T	1	0	0
2004	NYJ	16	1	31	397	12.8	35T	1	0	0
2005	NYJ	8	0	15	153	10.2	20	0	0	0
Career		152	104	580	7,365	12.7	70	41	8	6

== Awards and honors ==
- 1995: Newsday's "Jet of the Year," as voted on by the paper's readers.
- 1996: Awarded the Dennis Byrd Award for Most Inspirational Player as voted by his New York Jet teammates.
- 1996: Hofstra University Young Alumni Award. The award was bestowed to alumni who, within 10 years of graduation, achieved significant accomplishments in professional life.
- 1997: New York Jets "Unsung Hero Award"
- 2000: Thurman Munson Award for his outstanding efforts on an off the field and in serving in the community
- 2001: New York Jets Alumni Association's "Jets Player of the Year"
- 2002: Inducted into the Hofstra University Athletic Hall of Fame.
- 2005: Awarded the Ed Block Courage Award.
- 2010: NFL Top 10: Undrafted Players #10.
- 2014: Inducted into the New York Jets Ring of Honor.

== After the NFL ==
In 2007, Chrebet resided in Colts Neck Township, New Jersey. Chrebet has operated two restaurants on Long Island near his alma mater, Hofstra University. Initially a steakhouse called Chrebet's, it was later closed and reopened as a sports-themed bar/restaurant called "Social Sports Lounge and Kitchen."

In 2007, Chrebet stated that he still feels post-concussion symptoms as a result of the multiple concussions he suffered while playing in the NFL, including headaches, lethargy, and sensitivity to light and noise. Nonetheless, he stated in 2014 that he has no regrets about playing football, saying: "When you sign up, you expose yourself to these things. I knew the risks. I loved the contact. I miss that. But I had some high I got over getting a big hit or making a hit if I got somebody or they got me more. Would I play any other way than what I'm saying? No." Chrebet added that the NFL's newer concussion rules are "good for the game, but I couldn't play that way," and that despite the lasting effects of his playing days, "It was different back then. It's fun just how different it was."

The NFL Network recognized Wayne Chrebet's career in 2009 by including Chrebet in their Top 10 episode "Best Undrafted Players" at the number ten position.

Chrebet served as the "FCS Championship Game Ambassador" for the 2009 FCS Championship Game between Villanova and Montana.

On May 28, 2009, Chrebet joined Morgan Stanley as a financial advisor working out of the Red Bank, New Jersey office. In Fall 2012, Chrebet joined Barclays Capital as a financial advisor and Assistant Vice President working out of the Park Ave, New York City office.

On April 26, 2013, Chrebet was at Radio City Music Hall and formally announced the New York Jets 2nd round draft selection of quarterback Geno Smith during the 2013 NFL Draft.

Chrebet is routinely invited to attend Jets games as a guest of honor by owner Woody Johnson and also routinely serves as an ambassador on behalf of the New York Jets and National Football League via community service and public relations events. Chrebet was formally inducted into the New York Jets Ring of Honor December 1, 2014.

Chrebet is represented by R. Totka of Athlete Promotions.

Chrebet has owned standardbred (harness) racehorses since 2003.

On July 1, 2015, Chrebet qualified for daily fantasy sports provider FanDuel's World Fantasy Baseball Championship hosted by Bo Jackson, which took place on August 22, 2015.
