= Jason Glenn =

American football player (born 1979)

No. 56, 58, 51, 55
- Position: Linebacker

Personal information
- Born: August 20, 1979 (age 47); Humble, Texas, U.S.
- Listed height: 6 ft 0 in (1.83 m)
- Listed weight: 231 lb (105 kg)

Career information
- High school: Nimitz (Houston, Texas)
- College: Texas A&M (1997–2000)
- NFL draft: 2001: 6th round, 173rd overall pick

Career history
- Detroit Lions (2001)*; New York Jets (2001–2004); Miami Dolphins (2005); Minnesota Vikings (2006)
- * Offseason or practice squad member only

Awards and highlights
- Second-team All-American (2000); First-team All-Big 12 (2000)

Career NFL statistics
- Tackles: 114
- Passes defended: 5
- Fumble recoveries: 3
- Stats at Pro Football Reference

Jason Lydell Glenn (born August 20, 1979) is an American former professional football player who was a linebacker in the National Football League (NFL) for the New York Jets, Miami Dolphins, and Minnesota Vikings from 2001 to 2006. He played college football for the Texas A&M Aggies. He is the younger brother of retired NFL cornerback and New York Jets head coach Aaron Glenn.

== Early life and college ==
Jason played youth football in the same league his brother Aaron did, the Humble Area Football League HAFL. Glenn attended Chester W. Nimitz High School in Houston, Texas.

Glenn began his college career at Texas A&M University as a safety, but significant increases in size and strength made him better suited for the linebacker position, which he began playing his sophomore year. He was an All-Big 12 Conference first-team selection as a senior in 2000 despite suffering a season-ending knee injury. He finished his college career with 167 tackles (107 solo), 11 sacks, 22 passes deflected and 33 tackles for losses and was one of the Aggies' fan favorites as well as a vocal leader on and off the field.

He was selected a third-team All-American by the Associated Press.

== Professional career ==
Pre-draft measurables
Height	Weight	Arm length	Hand span	40-yard dash	10-yard split	20-yard split	20-yard shuttle	Three-cone drill	Vertical jump	Broad jump	Bench press
6 ft 0 5/8 in (1.84 m)	236 lb (107 kg)	32 1/2 in (0.83 m)	9 3/4 in (0.25 m)	4.93 s	1.65 s	2.75 s	4.31 s	7.16 s	36.0 in (0.91 m)	9 ft 7 in (2.92 m)	14 reps
All values from NFL Combine

Glenn was selected by the Detroit Lions in the sixth round of the 2001 NFL draft with the 173rd overall pick. Glenn played in the final 15 regular season games of 2001 as rookie with the Jets and finished fifth on the team in special teams tackles with 17. He played in an AFC wild card game at Oakland on January 12, 2002, and had one special teams tackle.

He played in all 16 of the 2002 Jets' games. Most of his time was spent on special teams, where he ranked second on the team with 27 tackles, as well as a blocked punt and one fumble recovery. He also had a tackle and a pass deflection in spot duty as an extra linebacker. He made one tackle on defense and two on special teams in the AFC Wild Card playoff game win over Indianapolis Glenn two special teams tackles in the AFC Divisional Playoff loss at Oakland.

Glenn played in 14 games in 2003 for Jets and saw his role increase significantly from his first two seasons. Although he was used primarily as the team's nickel linebacker, he did start once (game 14 against Pittsburgh) and ended up with 47 tackles on the season.

In 2004, he was limited due to injury—he suffered a fractured right arm against New England and missed six games with the injury. He finished with 10 tackles (seven solo) and a fumble recovery.

After signing with the Dolphins, Glenn played in all 16 games in 2005, primarily on special teams. He finished the year with 13 tackles (12 solo).

Joining the Vikings in 2006, Glenn played nine games, primarily on special teams. He had eight tackles on defense including six solo, and one fumble recovery on special teams before being placed on IR on November 14 with an injured knee. He re-aggravated that knee injury during 2007 training camp and was to again be placed on the IR on August 14, 2007. That same day, Vikings' head coach Brad Childress announced that Glenn was retiring from football.

== NFL career statistics ==
Legend
**Bold**	Career high

=== Regular season ===
Year	Team	Games		Tackles					Interceptions					Fumbles			
Year	Team	GP	GS	Cmb	Solo	Ast	Sck	TFL	Int	Yds	TD	Lng	PD	FF	FR	Yds	TD
2001	NYJ	15	0	11	10	1	0.0	0	0	0	0	0	0	0	0	0	0
2002	NYJ	**16**	0	19	19	0	0.0	0	0	0	0	0	1	0	0	0	0
2003	NYJ	14	**1**	**53**	**38**	**15**	0.0	0	0	0	0	0	**4**	0	0	0	0
2004	NYJ	10	0	10	7	3	0.0	0	0	0	0	0	0	0	**2**	**2**	0
2005	MIA	**16**	0	13	12	1	0.0	0	0	0	0	0	0	0	0	0	0
2006	MIN	9	0	8	6	2	0.0	0	0	0	0	0	0	0	1	0	0
		80	1	114	92	22	0.0	0	0	0	0	0	5	0	3	2	0

=== Playoffs ===
Year	Team	Games		Tackles					Interceptions					Fumbles			
Year	Team	GP	GS	Cmb	Solo	Ast	Sck	TFL	Int	Yds	TD	Lng	PD	FF	FR	Yds	TD
2001	NYJ	1	0	1	1	0	0.0	0	0	0	0	0	0	0	0	0	0
2002	NYJ	**2**	0	**3**	**3**	0	0.0	0	0	0	0	0	0	0	0	0	0
2004	NYJ	**2**	0	**3**	**3**	0	0.0	0	0	0	0	0	0	0	0	0	0
		5	0	7	7	0	0.0	0	0	0	0	0	0	0	0	0	0

== Coaching career ==
Jason was an assistant coach at Pearland High School in Pearland, Texas. The Oilers won the Texas Division 1 5A football title in 2010. In 2011, Jason became head football coach at Chavez High School in Houston, Texas. In 2012, Glenn was hired as assistant coach at Klein Oak High School, in Spring, Texas. In 2017, he was named the head football coach and athletic director at Klein Oak. On July 25, 2024, Glenn was announced as The Executive Athletic Director for Austin Independent School District in Austin, Texas.
