= Laveranues Coles =

American football player (born 1977)

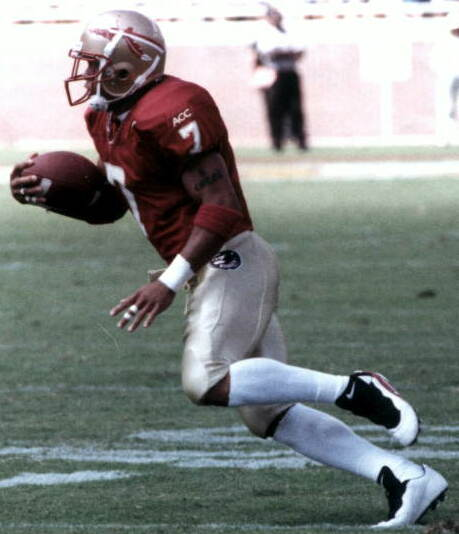
- Coles with the Florida State Seminoles in 1997

No. 87, 80, 11, 19
- Position: Wide receiver

Personal information
- Born: December 29, 1977 (age 48); Jacksonville, Florida, U.S.
- Listed height: 5 ft 11 in (1.80 m)
- Listed weight: 200 lb (91 kg)

Career information
- High school: Ribault (Jacksonville)
- College: Florida State (1996–1999)
- NFL draft: 2000: 3rd round, 78th overall pick

Career history
- New York Jets (2000–2002); Washington Redskins (2003–2004); New York Jets (2005–2008); Cincinnati Bengals (2009); New York Jets (2010)

Awards and highlights
- Pro Bowl (2003); BCS national champion (1999)

Career NFL statistics
- Receptions: 674
- Receiving yards: 8,609
- Receiving touchdowns: 49
- Stats at Pro Football Reference

Laveranues Leon Coles (/ləˈvɜːrniəs/; born December 29, 1977) is an American police officer and former professional football player who was a wide receiver for 11 seasons in the National Football League (NFL), primarily with the New York Jets. He played college football for the Florida State Seminoles. He was selected by the Jets in the third round of the 2000 NFL draft. A Pro Bowl selection in 2003, Coles also played for the Washington Redskins and Cincinnati Bengals.

== Early life ==
Coles was born in Jacksonville, Florida. While attending Ribault High School in Jacksonville, Coles played football, basketball, and ran track. In football, he rushed for nearly 5,000 yards in his career, was named to the Blue Chip Dream Team, and was a first team Class 4A All-State selection. In basketball, he was a member of a state championship team as a senior. In track, he recorded a time of 10.6 seconds in the 100 meter and 21.8 seconds in the 200 meter on the Ribault track team. Due to a scandal at Florida State which resulted in Coles's dismissal from the team, he often referred to his high school when introducing himself on Monday Night Football.

== College career ==
On September 29, 1999, during his senior season at Florida State, Coles and teammate Peter Warrick went to a Tallahassee, Florida Dillard's department store and, with the aid of a cashier with whom they were friendly, purchased $412.38 worth of clothing and were charged only $21.40—a discount so large that it is considered shoplifting under Florida law. An off-duty officer saw the event through a surveillance camera, according to police. Coles, Warrick, and the clerk, were arrested for grand theft. On October 22, Coles pleaded guilty to misdemeanor petty theft and was dismissed from the Florida State Seminoles football team. At that year's rivalry game at the University of Florida, Florida Gators fans brought Dillard's bags to Ben Hill Griffin Stadium to mock the team. Florida State won the game, and Seminole fans returned the mocking by requesting the bags as souvenirs.

Coles's childhood nickname was "Trouble". Coles was arrested in 1998 for simple battery, suspended for the Seminoles' 1999 season opener versus Louisiana Tech for academic reasons, and was discovered to have accepted a plane ticket from a sports agent's representative in 1999.

== Professional career ==
Pre-draft measurables
Height	Weight	Arm length	Hand span	40-yard dash	10-yard split	20-yard split	20-yard shuttle	Three-cone drill	Vertical jump	Broad jump
5 ft 11 1/4 in (1.81 m)	192 lb (87 kg)	30 5/8 in (0.78 m)	9 in (0.23 m)	4.44 s	1.56 s	2.60 s	4.39 s	6.89 s	34 in (0.86 m)	9 ft 7 in (2.92 m)
All values from NFL Combine

=== New York Jets (first stint) ===
Coles was selected by the New York Jets in the third round (78th overall) of the 2000 NFL draft. Coles' first career touchdown catch came in the Jets' Monday Night Miracle victory against the Miami Dolphins on October 23, 2000. As a rookie, he finished with 23 receptions for 370 yards and one touchdown in 13 games and three starts.

=== Washington Redskins ===
After a spectacular 2002 season, Coles signed with the Washington Redskins in the 2002 offseason. He said he left the Jets because the Redskins offered him more money. He made the Pro Bowl for the Redskins in 2003, after catching 82 passes for 1,204 yards, while playing the majority of the season with a fractured toe. It was the most receptions by a Washington player in a single season since Art Monk had 86 in 1989.

=== New York Jets (second stint) ===
He was traded back to the Jets in 2005 for Santana Moss. During the first year of his second stint with the Jets, Coles revealed that he had been sexually abused between ages 10 to 13 by a man whom his mother, Sirretta married. Coles refused to divulge the man's name. After the abuse was revealed, Sirretta Coles divorced the man, who was later sentenced to nine years in prison. He served about a third of his sentence and was released. He was convicted of another crime and has been imprisoned since 2001.

After a disappointing season in 2005, Coles enjoyed a rebirth in 2006, partly due to the good health of quarterback, Chad Pennington. On December 26, 2006, he caught the last touchdown on Monday Night Football's last game on ABC. On September 28, 2008, now with Brett Favre at quarterback, Coles caught 8 passes for 105 yards and 3 touchdowns in a 56–35 win over the Arizona Cardinals. That season, Coles tied his career high season touchdown mark that he set in 2001, with 7 touchdowns.

Coles was released by the Jets on February 25, 2009.

=== Cincinnati Bengals ===
Coles was signed by the Cincinnati Bengals on March 4, 2009. He would agree in principle to a four-year, $28 million contract. On January 9, 2010, Coles caught 6 passes for 48 yards and a touchdown in a 24–14 loss to his former team, the Jets, in the first round of the playoffs.

He was released by the Bengals on March 4, 2010, exactly one year after signing with the organization.

=== New York Jets (third stint) ===
The Jets announced Coles had been signed to a one-year contract on July 30, 2010. However, his stay would be brief as the team waived him after nearly a month on August 29, 2010.

On September 21, 2010, Coles was talked about in the media as an option to fill in for Braylon Edwards, who was charged with a DWI the previous night. He contemplated retirement.

On December 4, 2010, the Jets filled their open roster spot by signing Coles to yet another contract reuniting him with the Jets. The roster spot had been vacated when Jim Leonhard was placed on injured reserve with a fractured tibia. Coles was able to rejoin the team in time for their Monday night game against the New England Patriots for Week 13 of the NFL's 2010 season.

== Career after football ==
In 2025, Coles completed nine months of training at the Jacksonville Sheriff's Office Academy, with the intention of becoming a police officer. Coles's involvement with the sheriff's office is part of a recruiting effort to attract more people to police work. At least six other former NFL players, including Jeff Kopp, have become Jacksonville police officers.

== NFL career statistics ==
Legend
**Bold**	Career high

Receiving

Year	Team	GP	Rec	Tgts	Yards	Avg	Lng	TD	FD	Fum	Lost
2000	NYJ	13	22	—	370	**16.8**	63	1	16	0	0
2001	NYJ	16	59	—	868	14.7	40	**7**	42	0	0
2002	NYJ	16	89	—	**1,264**	14.2	43	5	**67**	**1**	0
2003	WAS	16	82	—	1,204	14.7	**64**	6	54	0	0
2004	WAS	16	90	—	950	10.6	45	1	52	**1**	**1**
2005	NYJ	16	73	—	845	11.6	43	5	52	**1**	0
2006	NYJ	16	**91**	**152**	1,098	12.1	58	6	52	**1**	0
2007	NYJ	12	55	89	646	11.7	57	6	35	0	0
2008	NYJ	16	70	117	850	12.1	54	**7**	44	**1**	0
2009	CIN	16	43	77	514	12.0	40	5	29	0	0
Career		153	674	435	8,609	12.8	64	49	443	5	1

Returning

Year	Team	GP	PRet	Yards	TD	FC	Lng	KRet	Yards	TD	FC	Lng
2000	NYJ	13	0	0	0	0	0	**11**	207	0	0	24
2001	NYJ	16	0	0	0	0	0	9	**211**	0	0	**34**
2006	NYJ	16	0	0	0	0	0	1	0	0	0	0
2009	CIN	16	0	0	0	0	0	1	14	0	0	14
Career		61	0	0	0	0	0	22	432	0	0	34

Rushing

Year	Team	GP	Att	Yards	Avg	Lng	TD	FD	Fum	Lost
2000	NYJ	13	2	15	7.5	8	0	0	0	0
2001	NYJ	16	**10**	**108**	**10.8**	20	0	**7**	**1**	0
2002	NYJ	16	6	39	6.5	21	0	2	0	0
2003	WAS	16	**10**	39	3.9	**23**	0	3	0	0
2004	WAS	16	3	-3	-1.0	7	0	2	0	0
2006	NYJ	16	2	14	7.0	15	0	1	0	0
2008	NYJ	16	2	9	4.5	6	0	0	0	0
2009	CIN	16	2	10	5.0	8	0	1	0	0
Career		153	37	231	6.2	23	0	16	1	0
