= Rock Springs High School =

Location
- 1375 James Drive; Rock Springs, WY, 82901
- Coordinates: 41°35′32″N 109°12′23″W

Information
- School type: Public high school
- School district: Sweetwater County School District Number 1
- NCES School ID: 560530200294
- Principal: Ben Straka
- Grades: 9–12
- Enrollment: 1,466 (2023-2024)
- Colors: Orange and black
- Athletics: Wyoming High School Activities Association
- Athletics conference: 4A
- Team name: Tigers
- Website: rshs.sweetwater1.org

Rock Springs High School is a high school campus located in Rock Springs, Wyoming, United States.

== Campus ==
The school grounds consist of a football field with encompassing track and nearby open field, tennis courts, a student parking lot, a faculty parking lot, a front lawn, and one side access parking lot. Students are allowed to sit on the front lawn but game play such as Frisbee is not allowed during school hours.

The school hosts a number of facilities in addition to the classrooms, including a swimming pool, two gymnasiums, a weights room, a cafeteria, and an Academic Learning Center. The ALC was formerly the school library, but its main function has changed in recent years due to the large lab of over one hundred iMac computers housed there. The ALC was the testing site for the 2010 PAWS assessment (formerly WYCAS), but due to technical problems, it was also to be the final year.

== Notable alumni ==
- Ozzie Knezovich, former Sheriff of Spokane County, Washington
- J. J. Syvrud, football player
- Spencer West, motivational speaker and disability advocate
- Brigadier General Shane R. Reeves, Rock Springs Class of 1992, he went on to be the 15th Dean of the Academic Board at The United States Military Academy at West Point and President of the University of Wyoming in Laramie, Wyoming.
