= J. J. Syvrud =

American football player (born 1977)

No. 50
- Position: Linebacker

Personal information
- Born: May 10, 1977 (age 49); Rock Springs, Wyoming, U.S.
- Listed height: 6 ft 3 in (1.91 m)
- Listed weight: 265 lb (120 kg)

Career information
- High school: Rock Springs (Wyoming)
- College: Jamestown
- NFL draft: 1999: 7th round, 235th overall pick

Career history
- New York Jets (1999–2000)
- Stats at Pro Football Reference

J. J. Syvrud (born May 10, 1977) is an American former professional football linebacker who played one season with the New York Jets of the National Football League (NFL). He was selected by the Jets in the seventh round of the 1999 NFL draft after playing college football at Jamestown College.

== Early life and college ==
J. J. Syvrud was born on May 10, 1977, in Rock Springs, Wyoming. He attended Rock Springs High School in Rock Springs.

Syvrud participated in football and track at Jamestown College. He was inducted into the Jamestown College Athletic Hall of Fame in 2006.

== Professional career ==
Syvrud was rated the 27th best outside linebacker in the 1999 NFL draft by NFLDraftScout.com. He was selected by the New York Jets in the seventh round, with the 235th overall pick, of the 1999 NFL draft and signed with the team on June 18, 1999. He played in one game for the Jets during the 1999 season. He was released by the Jets and signed to the team's practice squad on August 29, 2000. Syvrud was released by the Jets on September 1, 2001. He had a workout with the New England Patriots a few weeks after being cut by the Jets, but was not signed.

== Personal life ==
Syvrud worked for the Rock Springs Parks and Recreation Department after his NFL career, eventually advancing to the position of recreation superintendent. He was also an assistant coach for Rock Springs High School.
