= Giradie Mercer =

American football player (born 1976)

No. 97
- Position: Defensive tackle

Personal information
- Born: March 19, 1976 (age 50); Washington, D.C., U.S.
- Listed height: 6 ft 2 in (1.88 m)
- Listed weight: 285 lb (129 kg)

Career information
- High school: Howard D. Woodson (Washington, D.C.)
- College: Marshall
- NFL draft: 2000: undrafted

Career history
- Carolina Panthers (2000)*; Philadelphia Eagles (2000); New England Patriots (2001)*; Green Bay Packers (2001)*; New York Jets (2001–2002); Carolina Panthers (2003)*
- * Offseason or practice squad member only

Awards and highlights
- NCAA Division I-AA champion (1996); 2× First-team All-MAC (1998, 1999)

Career NFL statistics
- Games played: 2
- Stats at Pro Football Reference

Giradie Jordan Mercer III (born March 19, 1976) is an American former professional football player who was a defensive tackle for the New York Jets of the National Football League (NFL). He played college football for the Marshall Thundering Herd. He was also a member of the Carolina Panthers, Philadelphia Eagles, and New England Patriots but did not appear in any games for any of those teams.

== Early life and college ==
After graduating from Howard D. Woodson High School in his native Washington, D.C., Mercer attended Hargrave Military Academy for one year before attending Marshall University. With the Marshall Thundering Herd, Mercer was part of the 1996 NCAA Division I-AA national championship team as a freshman. In 1998, Mercer had 96 tackles including 16 for loss and four sacks, for which he earned first-team All-Mid-American Conference honors. Mercer graduated from Marshall in December 2004 with a B.A. in general studies.

== Professional career ==
Mercer signed with the Carolina Panthers as an undrafted free agent in April 2000 following the 2000 NFL draft but was released in June. On July 18, he signed with the Philadelphia Eagles. After suffering an injury during a preseason game, Mercer spent the 2000 season on injured reserve.

The Eagles waived Mercer on July 27, 2001. He signed with the New England Patriots on July 31, 2001 but was waived on August 20. On September 3, 2001, Mercer signed with the New York Jets practice squad. Mercer played in two games for the Jets in the 2002 season.
