= Faaesea Mailo =

American football player and coach (born 1978)

Profile
- Position: Guard

Personal information
- Born: February 11, 1978 (age 48); Torrance, California
- Listed height: 6 ft 4 in (1.93 m)
- Listed weight: 330 lb (150 kg)

Career information
- High school: Kahuku (Kahuku, Hawaii)
- College: Southern California
- NFL draft: 2002: undrafted

Career history

Playing
- New York Jets (2002)*
- * Offseason or practice squad member only

Coaching
- Pasadena City College (OL, 2007–2012) Kahuku High School (O.L, 2016-current)

Faaesea Mailo (born February 11, 1978) is an American former football offensive lineman. Mailo attended USC and went undrafted in 2002.

A native of Waialua, Hawaii, he attended Kahuku High & Intermediate School, where he was a football player and sumo wrestler.
