= Jason Wiltz =

American football player (born 1976)

No. 91
- Positions: Defensive tackle, defensive end

Personal information
- Born: November 23, 1976 (age 49); New Orleans, Louisiana, U.S.
- Listed height: 6 ft 4 in (1.93 m)
- Listed weight: 300 lb (136 kg)

Career information
- High school: St. Augustine (New Orleans)
- College: Nebraska (1994–1998)
- NFL draft: 1999: 4th round, 123rd overall pick

Career history
- New York Jets (1999–2000); Chicago Bears (2002)*
- * Offseason or practice squad member only

Awards and highlights
- NFL All-Rookie Team (1999); 3× National champion (1994, 1995, 1997)
- Stats at Pro Football Reference

Jason T. Wiltz (born November 23, 1976) is an American former professional football player who was a defensive lineman for two seasons with the New York Jets of the National Football League (NFL). He was selected by the Jets in the fourth round of the 1999 NFL draft. He played college football at the University of Nebraska–Lincoln.

== Early life ==
Jason T. Wiltz was born on November 23, 1976, in New Orleans, Louisiana. He attended St. Augustine High School in New Orleans.

== College career ==
Wiltz played college football for the Nebraska Cornhuskers of the University of Nebraska–Lincoln. He redshirted the 1994 season. In 1995, he only played in three games as a backup defensive tackle and did not record any tackles. Wiltz was then a three-year letterman from 1996 to 1998. He appeared in all 12 games in 1996, posting 20 tackles, including one sack. He played in 11 games, starting ten, during the 1997 season, totaling 14 solo tackles, 20 assisted tackles, two sacks, one fumble recovery, and one pass breakup. Wiltz played in ten games, starting nine, as a senior in 1998, recording ten solo tackles, 25 assisted tackles, one sack, one forced fumble, two interceptions, and two pass breakups. Wiltz graduated with a bachelor's degree in sociology in 2016.

== Professional career ==
Wiltz was selected by the New York Jets in the fourth round, with the 123rd overall pick, of the 1999 NFL draft. As a rookie, he had an interception in two straight games. He was named to the PFWA NFL All-Rookie Team. Wiltz was released by the Jets on September 2, 2001.

Wiltz signed with the Chicago Bears on March 22, 2002. He was released by the Bears on September 1, 2002.
