= Steve Martin (defensive tackle) =

American football player (born 1974)

No. 90, 73, 91, 99
- Position: Defensive tackle

Personal information
- Born: May 31, 1974 (age 52); Saint Paul, Minnesota, U.S.
- Listed height: 6 ft 4 in (1.93 m)
- Listed weight: 320 lb (145 kg)

Career information
- High school: Jefferson City (Jefferson City, Missouri)
- College: Missouri
- NFL draft: 1996: 5th round, 151st overall pick

Career history
- Indianapolis Colts (1996–1998); Philadelphia Eagles (1998–1999); Kansas City Chiefs (2000); New York Jets (2001); New England Patriots (2002); Green Bay Packers (2003)*; Houston Texans (2003); Minnesota Vikings (2004)
- * Offseason or practice squad member only

Awards and highlights
- Second-team All-Big Eight (1995)

Career NFL statistics
- Tackles: 294
- Sacks: 8
- Forced fumbles: 2
- Fumble recoveries: 4
- Passes defended: 13
- Stats at Pro Football Reference

Steven Albert Martin (born May 31, 1974) is an American former professional football player who was a defensive tackle for seven teams in nine seasons in the National Football League (NFL). He played college football for the Missouri Tigers.

He was selected by the Indianapolis Colts in 1996. After playing 30 games he was released by the Colts in 1998 and finished out the season in Philadelphia. After the 1999 season he went to Kansas City and the New York Jets. He played for the New England Patriots in 2002 but his constant media interviews angered coach Bill Belichick while his advertised strengths at stopping the run went unrealized. Following a 24–7 loss to a Tennessee Titans squad that rushed for 238 yards, Martin was interviewed by New York papers before a game against his former Jets team and his comments about the reduction in his role incensed Belichick, who cut him days before the game.

Martin played for Houston in 2003 and Minnesota in 2004 before his career ended. He finished with 127 games, 200 tackles, eight sacks, and two forced fumbles.

== NFL career statistics ==
Legend
**Bold**	Career high

=== Regular season ===
Year	Team	Games		Tackles				Interceptions				Fumbles			
Year	Team	GP	GS	Comb	Solo	Ast	Sck	Int	Yds	TD	Lng	FF	FR	Yds	TD
1996	IND	14	5	36	25	11	1.0	0	0	0	0	0	1	0	0
1997	IND	12	0	16	9	7	0.0	0	0	0	0	0	0	0	0
1998	IND	4	0	2	2	0	0.0	0	0	0	0	0	0	0	0
1998	PHI	9	3	28	21	7	1.0	0	0	0	0	**1**	0	0	0
1999	PHI	16	15	43	26	**17**	2.0	0	0	0	0	**1**	1	0	0
2000	KAN	16	0	13	8	5	0.0	0	0	0	0	0	0	0	0
2001	NYJ	16	15	57	40	**17**	**2.5**	0	0	0	0	0	**2**	0	0
2002	NWE	14	5	17	13	4	0.0	0	0	0	0	0	0	0	0
2003	HOU	14	8	**62**	**45**	**17**	1.0	0	0	0	0	0	0	0	0
2004	MIN	12	0	20	11	9	0.5	0	0	0	0	0	0	0	0
		127	51	294	200	94	8.0	0	0	0	0	2	4	0	0

=== Playoffs ===
Year	Team	Games		Tackles				Interceptions				Fumbles			
Year	Team	GP	GS	Comb	Solo	Ast	Sck	Int	Yds	TD	Lng	FF	FR	Yds	TD
1996	IND	1	1	5	2	**3**	0.0	0	0	0	0	0	0	0	0
2001	NYJ	1	1	**6**	**4**	2	0.0	0	0	0	0	0	0	0	0
2004	MIN	2	0	1	1	0	0.0	0	0	0	0	0	0	0	0
		4	2	12	7	5	0.0	0	0	0	0	0	0	0	0
