= James Darling (American football) =

American football player (born 1974)

No. 57, 51
- Position: Linebacker

Personal information
- Born: December 29, 1974 (age 51); Denver, Colorado, U.S.
- Listed height: 6 ft 1 in (1.85 m)
- Listed weight: 245 lb (111 kg)

Career information
- High school: Kettle Falls (Kettle Falls, Washington)
- College: Washington State
- NFL draft: 1997: 2nd round, 57th overall pick

Career history
- Philadelphia Eagles (1997–2000); New York Jets (2001–2002); Arizona Cardinals (2003–2006)

Awards and highlights
- Second-team All-American (1996); First-team All-Pac-10 (1996); Second-team All-Pac-10 (1995)

Career NFL statistics
- Total tackles: 429
- Sacks: 7.5
- Forced fumbles: 4
- Fumble recoveries: 1
- Interceptions: 6
- Stats at Pro Football Reference

James Jackson Darling (born December 29, 1974) is an American former professional football player who was a linebacker in the National Football League (NFL). He played college football for the Washington State Cougars before being selected by the Philadelphia Eagles in the second round of the 1997 NFL draft.

== High school and college career ==
Darling played high school football at Kettle Falls High School in Kettle Falls, Washington. He then played college football at Washington State University, where he was a two-time All-Pacific-10 Conference selection, and as a senior, he was also a second-team All-American selection by the Sporting News. He finished his career with 2.5 sacks, 258 tackles, four forced fumbles, and an interception.

== Professional career ==
Darling played for ten seasons in the National Football League (NFL), he was selected by the Philadelphia Eagles in the second round of the 1997 NFL draft and played there for four seasons. He then was traded to the New York Jets, where he played for two years and finally finished his career with the Arizona Cardinals, where he played for four more years.

== NFL career statistics ==
Year	Team	GP	Combined tackles	Total Tackles	AST	SACK	FF	FR	YDS	INT	YDS	AVG	LNG	TD	PD	STF
1997	Philadelphia Eagles	16	29	20	9	0.0	0	0	0	0	0	0	0	0	3	0
1998	Philadelphia Eagles	12	25	19	6	2.0	0	0	0	0	0	0	0	0	5	0
1999	Philadelphia Eagles	15	60	40	20	0.0	0	0	0	1	33	33	33	0	3	1
2000	Philadelphia Eagles	16	5	1	4	0.5	0	0	0	0	0	0	0	0	0	0
2001	New York Jets	16	22	16	6	0.0	1	0	0	0	0	0	0	0	0	0
2002	New York Jets	16	44	33	11	1.0	0	1	0	2	38	19	38	0	3	1
2003	Arizona Cardinals	16	30	30	0	2.0	0	0	0	0	0	0	0	0	0	1
2004	Arizona Cardinals	15	93	75	18	1.0	2	0	0	1	65	65	65	0	6	8
2005	Arizona Cardinals	14	88	71	17	1.0	0	0	0	2	22	11	15	0	3	3
2006	Arizona Cardinals	3	2	1	1	0.0	0	0	0	0	0	0	0	0	0	0
Total		139	398	306	92	7.5	4	1	0	6	158	26	65	0	23	13
