= Kelvin Moses =

American football player (born 1976)

No. 50
- Position: Linebacker

Personal information
- Born: September 3, 1976 (age 50); Hartsville, South Carolina, U.S.
- Listed height: 6 ft 0 in (1.83 m)
- Listed weight: 239 lb (108 kg)

Career information
- High school: Hartsville
- College: Wake Forest
- NFL draft: 2000: undrafted

Career history
- New York Jets (2000)*; Frankfurt Galaxy (2001); New York Jets (2001–2002)
- * Offseason or practice squad member only

Career NFL statistics
- Tackles: 22
- Stats at Pro Football Reference

Kelvin D. Moses (born September 3, 1976) is an American former professional football player for the NFL's New York Jets and the NFL Europe's Frankfurt Galaxy. He played college football for the Wake Forest Demon Deacons. Moses played three seasons professionally, appearing in 32 games for the Jets in 2001 and 2002 as a linebacker, gunner, or kick returner.

== Early life ==
Born in Hartsville, South Carolina, Moses attended Hartsville High School, where he was a three-year letterman and All-State honoree in football. He played strong safety and tight end, earning numerous regional and conference honors throughout his career. Moses was named the Red Foxes' MVP for the '93 season and was chosen to participate in the North-South All-Star Game that year.

As a senior, Moses accumulated 77 tackles and six interceptions while also catching 19 passes for 377 yards and eight touchdowns. Moses also set the school's records for receptions in a game, season, and career. He completed his high school career by helping lead his team to the 1993 SC 4A State Football Championship game where his Red Fox team was narrowly defeated by the Richland Northeast High School Cavaliers by a score of 30–24.

== College career ==
Moses enrolled at Wake Forest University and played five seasons for the Demon Deacons.

=== Statistics ===
| Year | Team | | | | | | |
| Year | Team | Tackles | TFL | Sacks | FF | FR | INT |
|---|---|---|---|---|---|---|---|
| 1994 | Wake Forest | 3 | 0 | 0 | 0 | 0 | 0 |
| 1995 | Wake Forest | 101 | 11 | 0 | 2 | 2 | 0 |
| 1996 | Wake Forest | 128 | 10 | 2 | 3 | 2 | 2 |
| 1997 | Wake Forest | 85 | 8 | 4 | 0 | 0 | 1 |
| 1998 | Wake Forest | 4 | 0 | 0 | 0 | 0 | 0 |
| Total | | 321 | 29 | 6 | 5 | 4 | 3 |

Moses was injured and required season-ending surgery in 1998.

== Professional career ==
Moses was signed by the New York Jets as an undrafted free agent on April 20, 2000. After being one of the final cuts during training camp, Moses returned home and prepared to restart his NFL career. Moses was resigned by the Jets on January 1, 2001. Moses was optioned by the Jets to the Frankfurt Galaxy in the NFL Europe league. Moses returned to the Jets in the fall and was a special teams standout for both 2001 and 2002 seasons. He made seven tackles for the Jets in 2002 and 15 tackles in 2002.

Moses was waived for the final time by the Jets on August 30, 2003.
