= Tory Woodbury =

American football player, coach, and scout (born 1978)

Current position
- Title: Head coach
- Team: Winston-Salem State
- Conference: CIAA
- Record: 0–0

Biographical details
- Born: July 12, 1978 (age 48); Winston-Salem, North Carolina, U.S.
- Education: Winston-Salem State

Playing career
- 1997–2000: Winston-Salem State
- 2001–2002: New York Jets
- 2003*: New Orleans Saints
- 2004*: Denver Broncos
- 2004: New Orleans VooDoo
- 2005*: Buffalo Bills
- 2005: Cologne Centurions
- 2006*: Buffalo Bills
- Position: Quarterback

Coaching career (HC unless noted)
- 2011–2014: Delaware State (RB)
- 2015–2017: Johnson C. Smith (OC)
- 2017–2021: Los Angeles Rams (asst. ST)
- 2022: Morgan State (TE/ST)
- 2023: St. Louis BattleHawks (TE/ST)
- 2024: Houston Roughnecks (ST)
- 2024: Howard (TE/ST)
- 2025: Norfolk State (ST)
- 2026–present: Winston-Salem State

Administrative career (AD unless noted)
- 2012: Jacksonville Jaguars (intern)
- 2014: Cleveland Browns (intern)
- 2017–2019: Los Angeles Rams (scout)

Head coaching record
- Overall: 0–0

Accomplishments and honors

Championships
- Super Bowl champion (LVI)

Tory Woodbury (born July 12, 1978) is an American football coach and former player who is the head coach for the Winston-Salem State Rams. He played professionally as a quarterback for the New York Jets of the National Football League (NFL).

Woodbury played college football for the Winston-Salem State Rams and was signed as an undrafted free agent by the Jets in 2001. He won Super Bowl LVI as a coach of the Los Angeles Rams in 2021.

== College career ==
Woodbury threw for a school record 4,536 passing yards with 40 touchdowns and also rushed for 1,020 yards and 20 touchdowns during his career at Winston-Salem State University. His 60 combined touchdowns also tied a Rams record.

== Professional career ==
Woodbury was signed by the New York Jets as an undrafted free agent. He was considered a sleeper in the draft by analysts Mel Kiper Jr. He played as quarterback and wide receiver for the Jets but then was released. He was signed by the Buffalo Bills for the 2006 season but was released afterwards.

== Coaching career ==
On July 22, 2015, Woodbury was named the offensive coordinator for the Johnson C. Smith Golden Bulls.

Woodbury became an assistant coach with the Los Angeles Rams in 2020, after three years of being a scout within the organization.

Woodbury was hired by the Roughnecks on July 24, 2023.

On March 12, 2024, Woodbury was hired as the special teams coordinator for the Howard Bison.

On January 31, 2025, Woodbury joined Michael Vick and his staff at Norfolk State as special teams coordinator.

Woodbury was hired as the head coach at his alma mater, Winston-Salem State, on December 5, 2025.

== Head coaching record ==
Year	Team	Overall	Conference	Standing	Bowl/playoffs
Winston-Salem State Rams (Central Intercollegiate Athletic Association) (2026–present)
2026	Winston-Salem State	0–0	0–0		
Winston-Salem State:		0–0	0–0		
Total:		0–0			
