= Sal Alosi =

American strength and conditioning coach (born 1977)

Biographical details
- Born: May 11, 1977 (age 49); Massapequa, New York, U.S.

Playing career
- 1996–2000: Hofstra
- Position: Linebacker

Coaching career (HC unless noted)
- 2001: Hofstra (Asst S&C)
- 2002–2005: New York Jets (Asst S&C)
- 2006: Atlanta Falcons (Head S&C)
- 2007–2010: New York Jets (Head S&C)
- 2011: Bryant (Head S&C)
- 2012–2017: UCLA (Head S&C)
- 2018–2020: UConn (Head S&C)

Sal Alosi (born May 11, 1977, in Massapequa, New York) is an American strength and conditioning coach.

== Playing career ==
Alosi was a cornerback at Hofstra University from 1996 to 2000. As a senior, he was named the co-recipient of the Mayor’s Trophy, an annual award presented to the two Hofstra players who best exemplify good sportsmanship and fair play both on and off the field. He won the award in 2000, despite having been arrested the year before for allegedly breaking into a dorm room with seven teammates and assaulting three students. Originally charged with third-degree assault, he later pleaded guilty to a lesser charge of second-degree harassment, a misdemeanor.

== Coaching career ==
He started as an assistant strength & conditioning coach for Hofstra in 2001 working with football, lacrosse, and basketball and then moved on to the New York Jets in 2002. In 2006, he joined the coaching staff of the Atlanta Falcons. He was hired as the Jets' strength and conditioning coach in 2007.

=== New York Jets tripping incident and others ===
During a game against the Miami Dolphins on December 12, 2010, Alosi stuck out his knee and tripped Miami gunner Nolan Carroll, who was running down the sideline during a punt return. Two days later, the Jets suspended him indefinitely after it was discovered that he had instructed inactive Jets players to line up along the sideline so as to potentially impede opposing players. General manager Mike Tannenbaum said that Alosi had initially not been truthful about how the wall had been formed. Alosi was fined $25,000 by the Jets and suspended for the remainder of the 2010 season. The NFL subsequently fined the Jets $100,000 for Alosi's actions.

In 2015, it was reported that in 2010 Alosi got into a fistfight with Jets cornerback Darrelle Revis. Additionally, a female chiropractor claimed Alosi "verbally abused and humiliated her, even trying to prohibit her from treating players because he was [ticked] off over petty issues involving towels and water." Both stories were confirmed by an anonymous Jet player.

Alosi resigned from the Jets on January 31, 2011.

=== College coaching ===
Alosi worked as the director of strength and conditioning at Bryant University in Smithfield, Rhode Island for the 2011–2012 school year. He worked primarily with the lacrosse, football, and basketball teams.

On January 10, 2012, Alosi was hired as the UCLA Bruins strength and conditioning coordinator by head coach Jim Mora.

On June 22, 2015, Alosi was involved in an altercation with rapper Sean "P. Diddy" Combs, over the coach's alleged harsh treatment of Combs's son Justin, who is on the Bruins football team. According to conflicting reports, Alosi either attempted to attack Combs with his hands, resulting in Combs using a kettlebell in self-defense, or Combs attempted to swing a kettlebell at Alosi's head but missed.

New UCLA coach Chip Kelly, wanting a change of regime, had Alosi leave due to their different coaching styles.

== Family ==
Alosi's brother, Pete, is an assistant strength and conditioning coach with the Arizona Cardinals.
