= Victor Green =

American football player (born 1969)

No. 21, 27, 23
- Position: Safety

Personal information
- Born: December 8, 1969 (age 56); Americus, Georgia, U.S.
- Listed height: 5 ft 11 in (1.80 m)
- Listed weight: 210 lb (95 kg)

Career information
- High school: Americus (GA)
- College: Akron
- NFL draft: 1993: undrafted

Career history
- New York Jets (1993–2001); New England Patriots (2002); New Orleans Saints (2003)

Awards and highlights
- NFL solo tackles leader (1996); NFL combined tackles leader (1996); New York Jets All-Time Four Decade Team

Career NFL statistics
- Tackles: 961
- Interceptions: 25
- Touchdowns: 3
- Stats at Pro Football Reference

Victor Bernard Green (born December 8, 1969) is an American former professional football player who was a safety in the National Football League (NFL). He played college football for the Akron Zips. Green was signed by the New York Jets as an undrafted free agent in 1993. He also played for the New England Patriots and New Orleans Saints.

== Professional career ==
Green entered the NFL as an undrafted free agent in 1993. By 1994, Green was the Jets' starting strong safety. He played for the Jets through the 2001 season. Green played the 2002 season with the New England Patriots and the 2003 season with the New Orleans Saints. On April 4, 2006, he signed with the Jets so that he could retire on the team with which he started his career. In 2003, Green was honored by being named a member of the Jets Four-Decade Team.
