= Phil Pettey =

American football player (born 1961)

No. 62
- Position: Guard

Personal information
- Born: April 17, 1961 (age 65); Kenosha, Wisconsin, U.S.
- Listed height: 6 ft 4 in (1.93 m)
- Listed weight: 274 lb (124 kg)

Career information
- High school: Mary D. Bradford (Kenosha)
- College: Missouri
- NFL draft: 1987: undrafted

Career history

Playing
- Atlanta Falcons (1987)*; Washington Redskins (1987)
- * Offseason or practice squad member only

Coaching
- New Orleans Saints (2001–2022) Tight Ends Coach; New York Jets (2000) Offensive Assistant Coach

Career NFL statistics
- Games played: 3
- Games started: 3
- Stats at Pro Football Reference

Philip Edward Pettey (born April 17, 1961) is an American former professional football player who was a guard for the Washington Redskins of the National Football League (NFL) in 1987. After four years in the United States Marines straight out of high school, he played college football for the Missouri Tigers, and made academic all-Big 8.

He was the assistant offensive line coach for the New Orleans Saints in 2000 and the tight ends coach for the New York Jets from 2001 to 2003. He also held coaching jobs with colleges such as LSU, USC and Pittsburgh. In 2018, Pettey was awarded a Super Bowl ring for playing for the Redskins in 1987, the year they won Super Bowl XXII.

He also is a former United States Marine.
