= Eric Ogbogu =

American football player (born 1975)

No. 99, 92, 90
- Position: Defensive end / Outside linebacker

Personal information
- Born: July 18, 1975 (age 51); Irvington, New York, U.S.
- Listed height: 6 ft 4 in (1.93 m)
- Listed weight: 270 lb (122 kg)

Career information
- High school: White Plains (NY) Archbishop Stepinac
- College: Maryland
- NFL draft: 1998: 6th round, 163rd overall pick

Career history
- New York Jets (1998–2001); Cincinnati Bengals (2002); Dallas Cowboys (2003–2005)

Awards and highlights
- Second-team All-ACC (1995)

Career NFL statistics
- Games played: 90
- Tackles: 64
- Sacks: 9.0
- Fumble recoveries: 4
- Stats at Pro Football Reference

Eric O. Ogbogu (born July 18, 1975) is an American former professional football player who was a defensive end in the National Football League (NFL) for the New York Jets, Cincinnati Bengals, and Dallas Cowboys. He played college football for the Maryland Terrapins.

== Early life ==
Ogbogu attended Archbishop Stepinac High School. He didn't start practicing football until his freshman year in high school, because he suffered from Blount's disease as a child.

He played fullback, linebacker and sometimes tight end. As a senior, he rushed for 1,803 yards and was one of the top ranked running backs in the state, while averaging 8 tackles per game as a linebacker. He also lettered in basketball.

== College career ==
Ogbogu accepted a football a scholarship from the University of Maryland. He played 5 games at tight end as a freshman. As a sophomore, he almost quit school after his father was killed in a carjacking in his native Nigeria. He was moved to defensive end that season, recording 45 tackles (12 for losses) and led the team with 6 sacks.

As a junior, he posted 64 tackles and led the team with 7 sacks. As a senior, he was limited with a sprained ankle and had 43 tackles (eighth on the team), 4 sacks, 3 forced fumbles and 3 fumble recoveries.

He finished ranked fifth in school history in career sacks (18½). He was named the MVP for the winning South team in the 1998 Hula Bowl after registering 4 sacks.

== Professional career ==
=== New York Jets ===
Ogbogu was selected by the New York Jets in the sixth round (163rd overall) of the 1998 NFL draft. As a rookie, he had 8 tackles in 12 games. In 1999, he made 12 tackles, one sack, one pass defensed and 2 fumble recoveries in 14 games (2 inactive).

In 2000, he entered training camp as the starter at right defensive end, but suffered a shoulder injury before the first preseason game. He was waived/injured on August 5 and was placed on the injured reserve list on August 7. In 2001, he had 24 tackles and one fumble recovery.

=== Cincinnati Bengals ===
On April 29, 2002, he was signed as a free agent by the Cincinnati Bengals. He registered 4 tackles in 12 games (4 inactive). He wasn't re-signed after the season.

=== Dallas Cowboys ===
On August 11, 2003, he signed with the Dallas Cowboys as a free agent, reuniting with Bill Parcells, who coached him with the New York Jets. He collected 30 tackles, 3.5 sacks, 10 quarterback pressures and 3 forced fumbles.

Ogbogu was mostly a backup at defensive end and outside linebacker, but had a memorable game on Thanksgiving Day in 2004 against the Chicago Bears, racking up 3½ sacks, second most in franchise history (Bob Lilly and Jim Jeffcoat are first with five sacks). He finished 11 tackles, 4.5 sacks (third on the team), 6 quarterback pressures, one pass defensed and one fumble recovery. In 2005, he was declared inactive in 10 games, had 2 quarterback pressures and wasn't re-signed at the end of the season.

== Personal life ==
Ogbogu is also the official star and spokesperson of the Under Armour brand, and is named "Big E" in the Under Armour commercials, after being hired by founder and former Maryland teammate Kevin Plank. His saying, "We must protect this house!" has been made famous from these advertisements. He was featured as "Big E" on EA Sports Fight Night Round 3. He also starred in the movie The Game Plan as the defensive end Drake.
