= J. P. Machado =

American football player (born 1976)

No. 63, 77
- Position: Offensive guard

Personal information
- Born: January 6, 1976 (age 50); Monmouth, Illinois, U.S.
- Listed height: 6 ft 4 in (1.93 m)
- Listed weight: 300 lb (136 kg)

Career information
- High school: Monmouth
- College: Illinois
- NFL draft: 1999: 6th round, 197th overall pick

Career history
- New York Jets (1999–2003)

Career NFL statistics
- Games played: 69
- Games started: 15
- Fumble recoveries: 1
- Stats at Pro Football Reference

J. P. Machado (born January 6, 1976) is an American former professional football player who played offensive guard for five seasons for the New York Jets. He was drafted in the sixth round of the 1999 NFL draft with the 197th overall pick.
