= Chris Hayes (American football) =

American football player (born 1972)

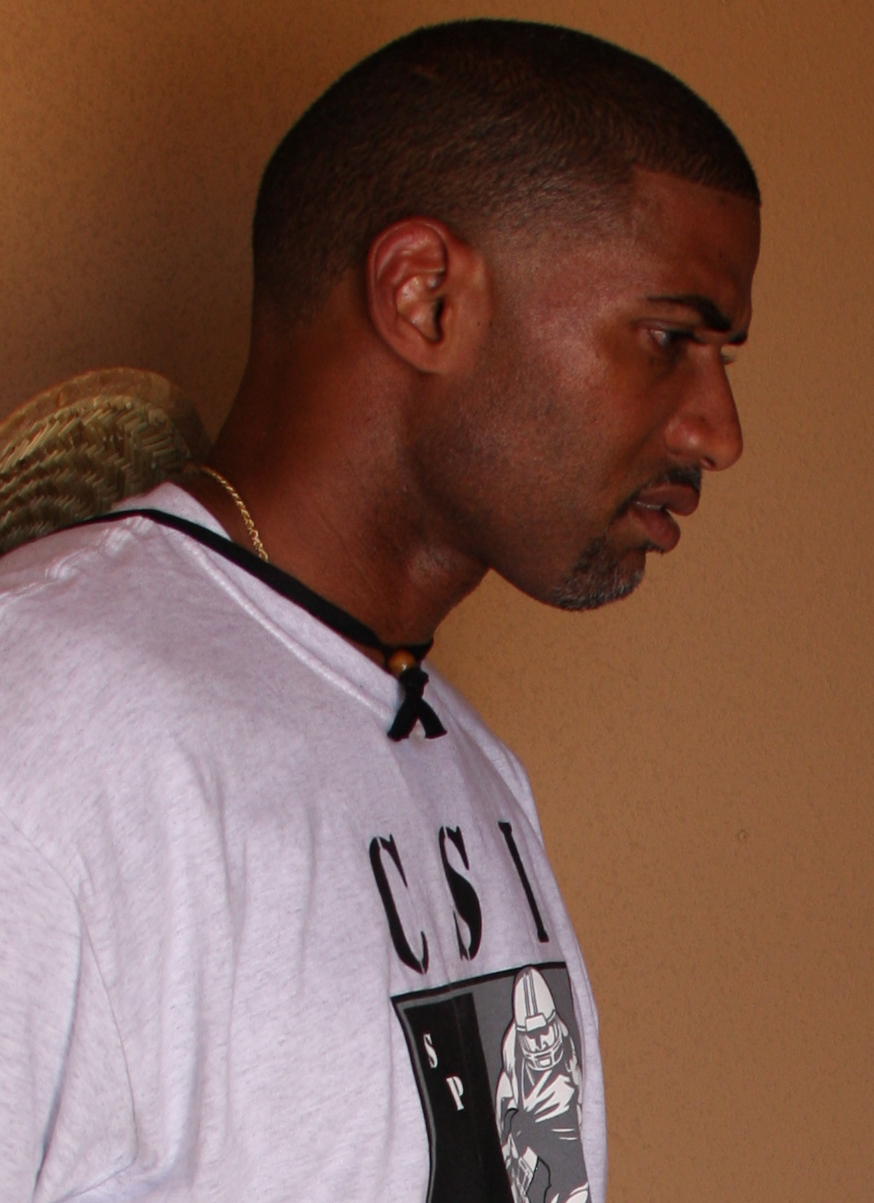
- Hayes in 2009

No. 40, 30, 29
- Position: Safety

Personal information
- Born: May 7, 1972 (age 54); San Bernardino, California, U.S.
- Listed height: 6 ft 0 in (1.83 m)
- Listed weight: 206 lb (93 kg)

Career information
- High school: San Gorgonio (San Bernardino)
- College: Washington State
- NFL draft: 1996: 7th round, 210th overall pick

Career history
- New York Jets (1996)*; Washington Redskins (1996)*; Green Bay Packers (1996); New York Jets (1997–2001); New England Patriots (2002)
- * Offseason or practice squad member only

Awards and highlights
- Super Bowl champion (XXXI); Second-team All-Pac-10 (1995)

Career NFL statistics
- Tackles: 89
- Interceptions: 1
- Forced fumbles: 2
- Stats at Pro Football Reference

Christopher Kareem Hayes (born May 7, 1972) is an American former professional football player who was a safety in the National Football League (NFL) for the Green Bay Packers, New York Jets, and New England Patriots. Hayes played college football for the Washington State Cougars.

He was selected by the New York Jets in the seventh round (210th overall) of the 1996 NFL draft. He spent the first year of his 7-year professional career with the Green Bay Packers, playing in two games for the 1996 Super Bowl XXXI champions. In 1997, he signed with the Jets and played there through the 2001 season. He signed with the Patriots for his last season in 2002.
