= David Loverne =

American football player (born 1976)

No. 79, 64, 61, 62
- Position: Guard

Personal information
- Born: May 22, 1976 (age 50); San Jose, California, U.S.
- Listed height: 6 ft 3 in (1.91 m)
- Listed weight: 293 lb (133 kg)

Career information
- High school: De La Salle (Concord, California)
- College: San Jose State
- NFL draft: 1999: 3rd round, 90th overall pick

Career history
- New York Jets (1999–2001); Washington Redskins (2002); St. Louis Rams (2003); Detroit Lions (2004–2005); Houston Texans (2006)*
- * Offseason or practice squad member only
- Stats at Pro Football Reference

David Dason Loverne (born May 22, 1976) is an American former professional football player who was a guard in the National Football League (NFL). He was selected by the New York Jets in the third round of the 1999 NFL draft. He played college football for the Idaho Vandals.

Loverne was also a member of the Washington Redskins, St. Louis Rams, Detroit Lions and Houston Texans.

== Early life ==
Loverne did not begin playing football until high school after his mother reportedly insisted he take up sports in order to stay out of trouble. His football team, De La Salle High School, was named national champion in five different years on a winning streak which began when Loverne played there as an offensive and defensive lineman his junior year. lineman.

== Professional career ==
Loverne first entered the NFL as third-round draft selection (90th overall) by the New York Jets in 1999 NFL draft.

David Loverne was inactive for the entire season but did play on special teams for the next 2 years- even getting in some O-Line rotational duty in 2001 to complement the team- even playing a series at Fullback (blocking) vs the Colts.

The Redskins acquired him from the New York Jets on April 8, 2002, to swap 5th round picks (154th for 160th).

Loverne started at left guard in the season opener in 2002, and played in fifteen of the regular season games that year, starting in eleven of them. He was hampered with a quad injury during week 6. On March 1, 2003, he was traded to the St. Louis Rams for running back Trung Canidate and a 2003 fourth-round pick.
