= Kerry Jenkins =

American football player (born 1973)

No. 71
- Position: Offensive tackle

Personal information
- Born: September 6, 1973 (age 53); Tuscaloosa, Alabama, U.S.
- Listed height: 6 ft 5 in (1.96 m)
- Listed weight: 305 lb (138 kg)

Career information
- College: Troy State
- NFL draft: 1997: undrafted

Career history
- Chicago Bears (1997)*; New York Jets (1997–2001); Tampa Bay Buccaneers (2002–2004)
- * Offseason or practice squad member only
- Stats at Pro Football Reference

Kerry Jenkins (born September 6, 1973) is an American former professional football player who was an offensive tackle in the National Football League (NFL). He played college football for the Troy State Trojans. He played in the NFL with the New York Jets from 1997 through 2001 and with the Tampa Bay Buccaneers from 2002 through 2004. Jenkins officially retired from the NFL in 2006.
