= Dennis O'Sullivan (American football) =

American football player (born 1976)

No. 60
- Position: Center

Personal information
- Born: January 28, 1976 (age 50); Suffern, New York, U.S.
- Listed height: 6 ft 3 in (1.91 m)
- Listed weight: 300 lb (136 kg)

Career information
- High school: North Rockland
- College: Tulane
- NFL draft: 1999: undrafted

Career history
- San Francisco 49ers (1999)*; New York Jets (1999–2000); Amsterdam Admirals (2001); San Diego Chargers (2001)*; New York Jets (2001–2003); Houston Texans (2004)
- * Offseason or practice squad member only
- Stats at Pro Football Reference

Dennis O'Sullivan (born January 28, 1976) is an American former professional football player who was a center for the New York Jets and Houston Texans of the National Football League (NFL). He played college football for the Tulane Green Wave.
