= Ray Buchanan =

American football player (born 1971)

No. 34
- Positions: Cornerback, safety

Personal information
- Born: September 29, 1971 (age 55); Chicago, Illinois, U.S.
- Listed height: 5 ft 9 in (1.75 m)
- Listed weight: 186 lb (84 kg)

Career information
- High school: Proviso East (Maywood, Illinois)
- College: Louisville
- NFL draft: 1993: 3rd round, 65th overall pick

Career history
- Indianapolis Colts (1993–1996); Atlanta Falcons (1997–2003); Oakland Raiders (2004)

Awards and highlights
- Second-team All-Pro (1998); Pro Bowl (1998); Kentucky Pro Football Hall of Fame (2016); Louisville Cardinals Athletics Hall of Fame (2006); Louisville Cardinals Football Ring of Honor; First-team All-Independent (1992); First-team All-South Independent (1991); Second-team All-South Independent (1990)

Career NFL statistics
- Tackles: 819
- Interceptions: 47
- Touchdowns: 4
- Stats at Pro Football Reference

Raymond Louis Buchanan (born September 29, 1971), nicknamed "Big Play Ray," is an American former professional football player who was a cornerback in the National Football League (NFL). He was selected in the third round of the 1993 NFL draft by the Indianapolis Colts with the 65th overall pick. Buchanan later played for seven seasons with the Atlanta Falcons, appearing in Super Bowl XXXIII, and one season with the Oakland Raiders. He played college football for the Louisville Cardinals.

== Early life ==
Ray Buchanan attended Proviso East High School in Maywood, Illinois, where he was a four-year letterman in football as a wide receiver, running back and safety. As a senior, Buchanan won Illinois state championships in two track and field events, the long jump and the triple jump.

== College career ==
As a freshman, Buchanan arrived at the University of Louisville expecting to continue to play running back and wide receiver, but reluctantly switched to defensive back. He played all four seasons under head coach Howard Schnellenberger. During his sophomore season, Buchanan helped Louisville finish the 1990 season with a 10–1–1 record where they went on to defeat Alabama 34–7 in the 1991 Fiesta Bowl. Buchanan was voted the Fiesta Bowl Defensive MVP. His best statistical season in college was as a junior in 1991, collecting a career-high 108 combined tackles (66 solo) and eight interceptions to earn an All-American honorable mention. During his senior season, he was named Second-Team All-American in 1992, amassing 95 combined tackles (55 solo), four interceptions, and 10 pass breakups.

== Professional career ==
=== Pre-draft ===
He was considered as one of the top defensive backs in the 1993 NFL Draft, but drew slight concerns over his lack of size. According to the Chicago Tribune, the teams that showed the most serious interest into Buchanan were the Atlanta Falcons, Seattle Seahawks, Dallas Cowboys, and Washington Redskins. NFL draft analysts projected Buchanan to be a late first to early to mid second-round pick in the 1993 NFL Draft.

Pre-draft measurables
Height	Weight	Arm length	Hand span	40-yard dash	10-yard split	20-yard split	20-yard shuttle	Vertical jump	Broad jump	Bench press
5 ft 9 in (1.75 m)	193 lb (88 kg)	32 7/8 in (0.84 m)	8 6/10 in (0.22 m)	4.50 s	1.59 s	2.64 s	4.00 s	36.0 in (0.91 m)	10 ft 7 in (3.23 m)	10 reps
All values from NFL Combine

=== Indianapolis Colts ===
==== 1993 ====
The Indianapolis Colts selected Buchanan in the third round (65th overall) of the 1993 NFL draft. The Colts traded their third- (73rd overall) and fifth-round picks (127th overall) in the 1993 NFL Draft to the Los Angeles Rams in return for the third-round pick (65th overall) they used to immediately select Buchanan. He was the eighth cornerback drafted in 1993.

On July 26, 1993, the Colts signed Buchanan to a three–year, $660,000 rookie contract that included a signing bonus of $285,000.

On September 5, 1993, Buchanan made his professional regular season debut in the Indianapolis Colts' home-opener against the Miami Dolphins and recorded one solo tackle as they lost 20–24. On October 31, 1993, Buchanan made one solo tackle, a pass deflection, and had his first career interception off a pass thrown by Scott Secules as they defeated the New England Patriots 6–9. Head coach Ted Marchibroda named Buchanan the starting free safety entering Week 14, replacing John Baylor. On December 5, 1993, Buchanan earned his first career start and recorded five combined tackles (four solo), set a season-high with two pass deflections, and intercepted a pass attempt by Boomer Esiason during a 9–6 win at the New York Jets. In Week 16, he set a season-high with 13 combined tackles (10 solo), had one pass deflection, and intercepted a pass by Bubby Brister during a 20–10 loss to the Philadelphia Eagles. He finished his rookie season with 59 combined tackles (45 solo), seven pass deflections, and four interceptions in 16 games and five starts.

==== 1994 ====
On January 8, 1994, the Indianapolis Colts hired Bill Tobin as general manager. Defensive coordinator Rick Venturi would be fired three days later and replaced by Vince Tobin. Head coach Ted Marchibroda planned to move Buchanan back to cornerback after he transitioned to free safety to replace starter John Baylor, but opted to cancel the plan after starting strong safety Jason Belser exercised a holdout and refused to attend training camp until his contract was resolved. He subsequently retained Buchanan as the starting free safety to begin the season and paired him with Jason Belser.

On September 4, 1994, Buchanan started in the Colts' home-opener against the Houston Oilers and recorded three combined tackles (two solo), one pass deflection, and intercepted a pass by Cody Carlson as they won 21–45. In Week 3, Buchanan set a season-high with 13 combined tackles (seven solo) and made two pass deflections during a 21–31 loss at the Pittsburgh Steelers. On November 6, 1994, Buchanan recorded eight combined tackles (seven solo), a pass deflection, and returned an interception for the first touchdown of his career during a 21–22 upset loss at the Miami Dolphins. With 7:41 remaining in the fourth quarter as the Colts led 14–12, Buchanan intercepted a pass Dan Marino attempted to throw to wide receiver Mark Ingram and returned it 28–yards for a touchdown to lead 21–12 after the PAT. Marino would lead a 10-point, fourth-quarter comeback to lead the Dolphins to a 21–22 win against the Colts.

Entering Week 12, defensive coordinator Vince Tobin moved Buchanan from starting free safety to starting cornerback after demoting Damon Watts. Watts became the starter after replacing Ashley Ambrose after the first three games. Buchanan remained a starting cornerback for the last five games, with David Tate taking over at free safety, and had the most successful run of his career. In Week 12, Buchanan earned his first start as a cornerback and recorded four solo tackles, three pass deflections, and sealed the Colts' 17–13 victory at the Cincinnati Bengals by intercepting a pass by Jeff Blake to wide receiver Darnay Holmes in the endzone with less than 30 seconds remaining in the game. On December 4, 1994, Buchanan made nine combined tackles (eight solo), one pass deflection, one sack, had his second pick-six of the season, and sealed the Colts' victory by recovering an onside kick attempt by John Kasay with 4:10 remaining in their 31–19 win at the Seattle Seahawks. His pick-six occurred after he intercepted a pass by Rick Mirer to wide receiver Kelvin Martin and returned it 37 yards for a touchdown and he also recorded his first career sack on Dan McGwire for a six–yard loss. On December 11, 1994, Buchanan made seven combined tackles (five solo), three pass deflections, set a season-high with two interceptions on passes thrown by Drew Bledsoe, and returned an interception on a pass Bledsoe threw to wide receiver Michael Timpson for a 90–yard touchdown during a 13–28 loss at the New England Patriots. This marked his sixth interception in the last five consecutive games. In Week 17, he recorded nine combined tackles (seven solo), set a season-high with four pass deflections, and picked off a pass Frank Reich attempted to throw to wide receiver Andre Reed as the Colts defeated the Buffalo Bills 9–10. He started all 16 games throughout the 1994 NFL season and set a career-high with 100 combined tackles (76 solo), 23 pass deflections, eight interceptions, and three touchdowns. He also recorded a fumble recovery and one sack.

==== 1995 ====
After an impressive performance to cap off the previous season taking over the starting cornerback role, Buchanan requested a new contract as he only has one–year remaining on his current contract, where he was set to make the minimum salary for a third–year veteran of $178,000. When he did not receive a new contract, Buchanan and teammate Tony Siragusa both exercised contract holdouts and refused to attend spring camp or mandatory mini camp. On August 5, 1995, both Buchanan and Siragusa ended their holdouts and attended training camp, where he returned to his role as a starting cornerback under defensive coordinator Vince Tobin. He was named a starting cornerback to begin the season and was paired with Eugene Daniel. On December 5, 1995, Buchanan recorded two solo tackles, set a season-high with three pass deflections, and intercepted a pass by Eric Guliford to wide receiver Mark Carrier during a 10–13 loss at the Carolina Panthers. In Week 16, he set a season-high with nine solo tackles and made one pass deflection during a 24–27 loss to the San Diego Chargers. He started in all 16 games at cornerback and made 83 combined tackles (68 solo), 17 pass deflections, two fumble recoveries, one forced fumble, one sack, and two interceptions.

The Indianapolis Colts finished the 1995 NFL season first in the AFC East with a 9–7 record to clinch a playoff berth. On December 31, 1995, Buchanan started in the first playoff game in his career and recorded three combined tackles (two solo) and made one pass deflection during a 35–20 victory at the San Diego Chargers in the AFC Wild-Card Game. On January 14, 1996, Buchanan started in the AFC Championship Game at the Pittsburgh Steelers and recorded six combined tackles (five solo) and one pass deflection as they lost 16–20.

==== 1996 ====
On January 24, 1996, the Indianapolis Colts signed Buchanan to a one–year, $1.80 million contract. On February 8, 1996, defensive coordinator Vince Tobin left the Colts after he accepted the position as head coach with the Arizona Cardinals. On February 15, 1996, the Colts promoted offensive coordinator Lindy Infante to head coach following the departure of Ted Marchibroda who became the first head coach of the Baltimore Ravens. Ted Marchibroda declined to re-sign with the Colts after they refused to increase his salary.

Defensive coordinator Jim Johnson retained Buchanan as the No. 1 starting cornerback to begin the season and paired him with rookie Dedric Mathis. In Week 8, he set a season-high with eight combined tackles (seven solo) and had one pass break-up during a 9–27 loss to the New England Patriots. In Week 12, Buchanan recorded four solo tackles, set a season-high with two pass deflections, and intercepted a pass Frank Reich threw to wide receiver Jeff Graham during a 29–35 win against the New York Jets. He was inactive for three games (Weeks 13–15) after suffering an injury to his thigh. He completed the 1996 NFL season with 63 combined tackles (52 solo), eight pass deflections, two interceptions, and one forced fumble in 13 games and 13 starts.

On February 26, 1997, the Colts offered a one–year, $2.78 million transition tag to Buchanan. As an unrestricted free agent, other teams would acquire Buchanan if they made a larger offer.

=== Atlanta Falcons ===
==== 1997 ====
On March 2, 1997, the Atlanta Falcons signed Buchanan after the Colts designated him their transition tag and did not match the one–year, $3.25 million contract offer made by the Falcons. The Falcons signed Buchanan to immediately take over as a starting cornerback following the departures of Anthony Phillips, Darnell Walker, and Tim McKyer.

On March 3, 1997, the Atlanta Falcons signed Buchanan to a four–year, $13 million contract that includes a $4 million signing bonus. Their contract added restructured their one–year contract signed the previous day, while adding an additional three–year extension. Head coach Dan Reeves named Buchanan the No. 1 starting cornerback to begin the season and paired him with Ronnie Bradford.

In Week 9, Buchanan made three combined tackles (two solo), one pass deflection, and intercepted a pass by Kerry Collins to wide receiver Rocket Ismail during a 12–21 loss at the Carolina Panthers. The following week, he set a season-high with ten solo tackles, made one pass deflection, and intercepted a pass Tony Banks threw to wide receiver Isaac Bruce as the Falcons defeated the St. Louis Rams 31–34 in Week 10. On December 7, 1997, Buchanan recorded two solo tackles, set a season-high with three pass deflections, and intercepted two pass attempts thrown by Craig Whelihan during a 14–3 victory at the San Diego Chargers. He started all 16 games throughout the 1997 NFL season and finished with a total of 52 combined tackles (48 solo), 18 pass deflections, and five interceptions.

==== 1998 ====
He returned to training camp slated as the No. 1 starting cornerback under defensive coordinator Rich Brooks. Head coach Dan Reeves named Buchanan and Ronnie Bradford as the starting cornerback duo to begin the season.

On September 6, 1998, Buchanan started in the Atlanta Falcons' season-opener at the Carolina Panthers and recorded six solo tackles, set a career-high with five pass deflections, and intercepted a pass by Kerry Collins to wide receiver Mark Carrier as they won 19–16. In Week 4, Buchanan set a season-high with eight combined tackles (seven solo), made two pass break-ups, and intercepted a pass Steve Young threw to wide receiver Jerry Rice during a 20–31 loss at the San Francisco 49ers. In Week 11, he made four solo tackles, a pass deflection, and intercepted a pass by Steve Young to tight end Greg Clark as they defeated the San Francisco 49ers 19–31. He started in all 16 games for the second consecutive season and finished with 61 combined tackles (54 solo), 22 pass deflections, and seven interceptions. He was named to me 1999 Pro Bowl, marking his first and only Pro Bowl selection of his career.

The Atlanta Falcons finished in first place in the NFC West with a 14–2 record during the 1998 NFL season, clinching a playoff berth and a first round bye. On January 9, 1999, Buchanan made four combined tackles (three solo) and three pass deflections during a 20–18 win against the San Francisco 49ers in the Divisional Round. The following week, he started in the NFC Championship Game and recorded five solo tackles and two pass deflections during a 30–27 overtime victory at the Minnesota Vikings. On January 31, 1999, Buchanan started in Super Bowl XXXIII and recorded three combined tackles (one solo) and had one pass break-up as the Falcons lost 19–34 against the Denver Broncos. Buchanan Drew criticism for guaranteeing a victory against the Denver Broncos in the Super Bowl.

==== 1999 ====
Head coach Dan Reeves retained Buchanan and Ronnie Bradford as the starting cornerbacks to begin the season for the third consecutive year. In Week 4, Buchanan recorded two solo tackles before he was ejected by officials in the third quarter for slamming wide receiver Patrick Johnson to the turf and punching him as retaliation for Johnson taunting Buchanan after he caught a 52–yard touchdown reception in the Falcons' 19–13 overtime loss against the Baltimore Ravens.

"It's something I regret. Before I could even think, I reacted in the wrong way. It was very out of the ordinary for myself, very uncharacteristic."

— Ray Buchanan
(October 4, 1999)

On October 8, 1999, the NFL announced their decision to levy fines against both players. Buchanan was fined $7,500 for unnecessary roughness and Patrick Johnson was fined $3,500 for taunting. On October 10, 1999, Buchanan made four solo tackles, two pass deflections, and intercepted a pass Billy Joe Tolliver threw to wide receiver Scott Slutzker during a 20–17 victory at the New Orleans Saints. In Week 6, he set a season-high with eight solo tackles and made one pass deflection during a 13–41 loss against the St. Louis Rams. On December 5, 1999, Buchanan recorded six combined tackles (five solo), set a season-high with three pass deflections, made two interceptions, and returned one for a touchdown as the Falcons defeated the New Orleans Saints 12–35. His pick-six occurred after he intercepted a pass Danny Wuerffel threw to wide receiver Eddie Kennison and returned it 52–yards for a touchdown. He started all 16 games throughout the 1999 NFL season and finished with 63 combined tackles (57 solo), 18 pass deflections, 4 interceptions, 1 sack, and 1 touchdown.

==== 2000 ====
On February 12, 2000, the Atlanta Falcons signed cornerback Ashley Ambrose who was Buchanan's former teammate for three seasons with the Indianapolis Colts. Defensive coordinator Rich Brooks elected to change Ronnie Bradford from the No. 2 starting cornerback to the starting free safety in order to replace Eugene Robinson following his departure. Subsequently, Ashley Ambrose was selected to take over as the No. 2 starting cornerback.

In Week 3, Buchanan made four combined tackles (three solo), a pass deflection, one interception, and helped secure a 15–10 victory at the Carolina Panthers by recovering a fumble that Ronnie Bradford forced by running back Tim Biakabutuka with 4:10 remaining in the fourth quarter as the Falcons' led 13–10 at the time. On October 29, 2000, Buchanan recorded three solo tackles, two pass deflections, and set a season-high with two interceptions on passes by Steve Beuerlein as the Falcons defeated the Carolina Panthers 13–12. The following week, he recorded three solo tackles, made one pass deflection, a fumble recovery, and intercepted a pass attempt thrown by Shaun King during a 14–7 loss against the Tampa Bay Buccaneers in Week 10. In Week 13, he set a season-high with ten combined tackles (eight solo) during a 14–41 loss at the Oakland Raiders. He started all 16 games for the fourth consecutive season and finished with 80 combined tackles (69 solo), 20 pass deflections, six interceptions, and two fumble recoveries.

==== 2001 ====
On February 21, 2001, the Atlanta Falcons signed Buchanan to a six–year, $36 million contract extension that included an initial signing bonus of $8 million. The Falcons promoted linebackers coach Don Blackmon to defensive coordinator following the resignation of Ron Brooks. Head coach Dan Reeves retained Buchanan and Ashley Ambrose as the starting cornerback duo to begin the season.

On September 9, 2001, Buchanan started in the Falcons' season-opener at the San Francisco 49ers and set a season-high with nine solo tackles during a 13–16 overtime loss. In Week 3, he recorded two solo tackles, one pass deflection, and intercepted a pass Jake Plummer threw to wide receiver David Boston during a 34–14 victory at the Arizona Cardinals. On November 18, 2001, Buchanan recorded three solo tackles, set a season-high with four pass deflections, and intercepted a pass Brett Favre threw to wide receiver Bill Schroeder during a 23–20 victory at the Green Bay Packers. He started all 16 games for the fifth consecutive season and recorded 71 combined tackles (63 solo), 19 pass deflections, and five interceptions.

==== 2002 ====
On February 11, 2002, the Atlanta Falcons hired Wade Phillips to be their new defensive coordinator after they fired Don Blackmon. Head coach Dan Reeves named Buchanan and Ashley Ambrose as the starting cornerbacks to begin the season. On September 11, 2002, the NFL officially sanctioned a four-game suspension (Weeks 2–6) for Buchanan after he tested positive for anabolic steroids. Both drug tests were administered before the start of the Falcons' season-opener at the Green Bay Packers. He said the failed tests for anabolic steroids was due to a nutritional supplement containing ephedrine, a substance banned by the NFL. The four-game suspension forfeited $600,000 of his salary.

On October 20, 2002, Buchanan made two solo tackles, two pass deflections, and intercepted a pass by Randy Fasani to wide receiver Steve Smith Sr. during a 30–0 victory at the Carolina Panthers. In Week 13, Buchanan made five solo tackles, a pass deflection, and intercepted a pass Daunte Culpepper threw to wide receiver Randy Moss during a 30–24 overtime victory at the Minnesota Vikings. He finished the season with 47 combined tackles (42 solo), 12 pass deflections, and two interceptions in 12 games and 12 starts.

The Atlanta Falcons finished the 2002 NFL season second in the NFC West with a 9–6–1 record. On January 11, 2003, Buchanan was replaced in the starting lineup by Juran Bolden due to an injury, but was forced into action after Bolden seriously injured the parteller tendon in his knee. Buchanan recorded four solo tackles and two pass deflections as the Falcons lost the Divisional Round 6–20 at the Philadelphia Eagles.

==== 2003 ====
The Atlanta Falcons signed cornerback Tyrone Williams following the departure of Ashley Ambrose in free agency and due to a serious knee injury to Juran Bolden that was expected sideline him for the duration of training camp. Head coach Dan Reeves named Buchanan and Tyrone Williams as the starting cornerbacks to begin the season.

In Week 2, he set a season-high with seven solo tackles and three pass deflections during a 31–33 loss against the Washington Redskins. On October 28, 2003, defensive coordinator Wade Phillips announced his decision to bench all of the starters in the secondary, including Buchanan, ahead of a Week 9 matchup against the Philadelphia Eagles. Buchanan unexpectedly lost his role to Juran Bolden after he recently had returned from a knee injury and re-joined the active roster where he would remain the starting cornerback for he remainder of the season. At the time, the Falcons had a six-game losing streak and the defense were on pace to allow the second most yards in a single season in league history. On December 10, 2003, the Atlanta Falcons fired head coach Dan Reeves after they fell to a 3–10 record. Defensive coordinator Wade Phillips was appointed to interim head coach for the rest of the season. He finished the season with 47 combined tackles (42 solo), eight pass deflections, and one interception in 15 games and eight starts.

On March 1, 2004, the Atlanta Falcons released Buchanan after seven seasons.

=== Oakland Raiders ===
==== 2004 ====
On April 5, 2004, the Oakland Raiders signed Buchanan to a five–year, $11.36 million contract that included an initial signing bonus of $600,000. Buchanan immediately stated he intended to play free safety with the uncertainty of former starter, Rod Woodson, returning after a knee injury. The Raiders were abundant with talent at the cornerback position at the time, with three former first-round picks in Phillip Buchanon (2002), Charles Woodson (1998), and Nnamdi Asomugha (2003).

He entered training camp projected as the starting free safety under defensive coordinator Rob Ryan with his only minor competition being rookie Stuart Schweigert. Head coach Norv Turner named Buchanan the starting free safety to begin the season and paired him with Marques Anderson.

On September 19, 2004, Buchanan made five combined tackles (three solo), a pass deflection, and had his lone interception of the season on a pass Drew Bledsoe threw to wide receiver Travis Henry during a 13–10 win against the Buffalo Bills. In Week 6, Buchanan set a season-high with ten combined tackles (nine solo) during a 3–31 loss at the Denver Broncos. He started all 16 games throughout the 2004 NFL season and finished with a total of 92 combined tackles (66 solo), six pass deflections, and one interception.

On February 28, 2005, the Raiders released Buchanan after only one season.

== Career statistics ==
=== NFL ===
==== Regular season ====
Year	Team	Games		Tackles				Interceptions					Fumbles			
Year	Team	GP	GS	Comb	Solo	Ast	Sck	Int	Yds	Avg	Lng	TD	FF	FR	Yds	TD
1993	IND	16	5	65	—	—	0.0	4	45	11.3	28	0	0	0	0	0
1994	IND	16	16	100	76	24	1.0	8	221	27.6	90	3	0	1	0	0
1995	IND	16	16	83	68	15	1.0	2	60	30.0	60	0	0	2	0	0
1996	IND	13	13	62	53	9	0.5	2	32	16.0	32	0	1	0	0	0
1997	ATL	16	16	52	48	4	0.0	5	49	9.8	31	0	0	0	0	0
1998	ATL	16	16	61	54	7	0.0	7	102	14.6	34	0	1	0	0	0
1999	ATL	16	16	63	57	6	1.0	4	81	20.3	52	1	0	0	0	0
2000	ATL	16	16	80	69	11	0.0	6	114	19.0	60	0	0	2	1	0
2001	ATL	16	16	71	63	8	0.0	5	85	17.0	33	0	1	1	0	0
2002	ATL	12	11	47	42	5	0.0	2	9	4.5	9	0	0	0	0	0
2003	ATL	15	8	47	42	5	0.0	1	2	2.0	2	0	0	0	0	0
2004	OAK	16	16	92	66	26	0.0	1	27	27.0	27	0	1	0	0	0
Career		184	165	823	638	120	3.5	47	827	17.6	90	4	4	6	1	0

=== College ===
Season	Team	Class	Games	Tackles					Interceptions				
Season	Team	Class	Games	Cmb	Solo	Ast	TfL	Sck	Int	Yds	Lng	TD	PD
1989	Louisville	Fr	11	11	8	3	0	0.0	0	0	0	0	0
1990	Louisville	So	11	59	46	13	0	0.0	3	9	0	0	0
1991	Louisville	Jr	11	108	66	42	0	0.0	8	89	0	0	0
1992	Louisville	Sr	11	95	55	40	2	0.0	4	55	0	0	10
Career			44	273	175	98	2	0.0	15	153	0	0	10

Notes - Statistics include bowl game performances.

== Post-NFL career ==
Buchanan made a rap music album in 2002.

He works for Fox Sports Radio on the weekend and co-hosts alongside Bruce Jacobs.

Buchanan was inducted into the Kentucky Pro Football Hall of Fame in 2016.
