= Kevin Lewis (defensive back) =

American football player (born 1966)

No. 45
- Position: Cornerback

Personal information
- Born: November 14, 1966 (age 60); New Orleans, Louisiana, U.S.
- Listed height: 5 ft 11 in (1.80 m)
- Listed weight: 173 lb (78 kg)

Career information
- High school: Alcée Fortier (New Orleans)
- College: Northwestern State
- NFL draft: 1989: undrafted

Career history
- Phoenix Cardinals (1989)*; San Francisco 49ers (1990–1992)
- * Offseason or practice squad member only

Career NFL statistics
- Interceptions: 3
- Stats at Pro Football Reference

Kevin Lewis (born November 14, 1966) is an American former professional football player who was a cornerback for the San Francisco 49ers and Phoenix Cardinals of the National Football League (NFL). He played college football for the Northwestern State Demons.

== Early life ==
Lewis was born on November 14, 1966, in New Orleans. He played high school football at Alcée Fortier High School alongside other future NFL cornerbacks Maurice Hurst and Aeneas Williams. He earned all-district honors in football and basketball and graduated valedictorian of his class.

== College career ==
Lewis, who was just 5'7" and 146 pounds coming out of high school, persuaded Northwestern State Demon coaches to let him walk on as a cornerback. He played for the Demons from 1985 to 1988.

In 2007, he was inducted into the N-Club Hall of Fame and selected to the Top 100 Demons of the Century roster.

== Professional career ==
=== Phoenix Cardinals ===
Lewis played with the Phoenix Cardinals in 1989. He was released by the team on July 27, 1989.

=== San Francisco 49ers ===
==== 1990 season ====
Lewis signed with the San Francisco 49ers on April 26, 1990. He was released on September 4.

On September 27, he signed again with the 49ers. He played in four games with the team before being released on November 5. However, he signed with the team for a third time on November 23. He then played in the 49ers' next six regular season games, as well as their two postseason appearances, a Divisional Round 28–10 win over the Washington Redskins and a 15–13 loss in the NFC Championship Game to the New York Giants.

Lewis recorded one interception in the 1990 season, which he returned for 28 yards during a 13–10 loss to the New Orleans Saints on December 23, 1990.

==== 1991 season ====
Lewis played in all 16 games in the 1991 season, starting three. His three starts were a September 15 game against the Minnesota Vikings, a September 22 game against the Los Angeles Rams, and a December 8 game against the Seattle Seahawks. In the December 8 game, he was also used for a punt return, the only time he was in that role during an NFL game.

Lewis made two interceptions in 1991. The first was in the aforementioned game against the Vikings, and the second was during the last game of the season, a 52–14 win over the Chicago Bears on December 23. He returned that interception for 20 yards.

==== 1992 season ====
Lewis was injured during the 1992 preseason and put on injured reserve on September 1, less than a week before the beginning of the regular season.

== Personal life ==
Lewis was married to Sarah Lewis, with whom he has children Kevin Lewis Jr., Cameron Lewis, and Makayla Lewis. He is currently married to Kimberley Lewis. Cameron, like his father, played cornerback at Northwestern State. Kevin Lewis lives in Clinton, Mississippi.
