= Duke Tobin =

American football executive (born 1970)

Cincinnati Bengals
- Title: Director of player personnel

Personal information
- Born: September 15, 1970 (age 56)

Career information
- Position: Quarterback
- College: Colorado

Career history

Playing
- Orlando Predators (1994); Memphis Pharaohs (1995)

Operations
- Cincinnati Bengals (1999–present) Director of Player Personnel

Career AFL statistics
- TDs–INTs: 9–7
- Passing yards: 678
- Stats at ArenaFan.com

Duke Tobin (born September 15, 1970) is an American professional football executive who is the director of player personnel and de facto general manager for the Cincinnati Bengals of the National Football League (NFL). He played in the Arena Football League (AFL) for the Orlando Predators in 1994 and Memphis Pharaohs in 1995. He played college football at Illinois & Colorado.

Tobin was named the Bengals' director of player personnel in 1999. His father Bill Tobin and uncle Vince Tobin have both had numerous jobs with the NFL.
