= Jim Johnson (American football) =

American football player and coach (1941–2009)

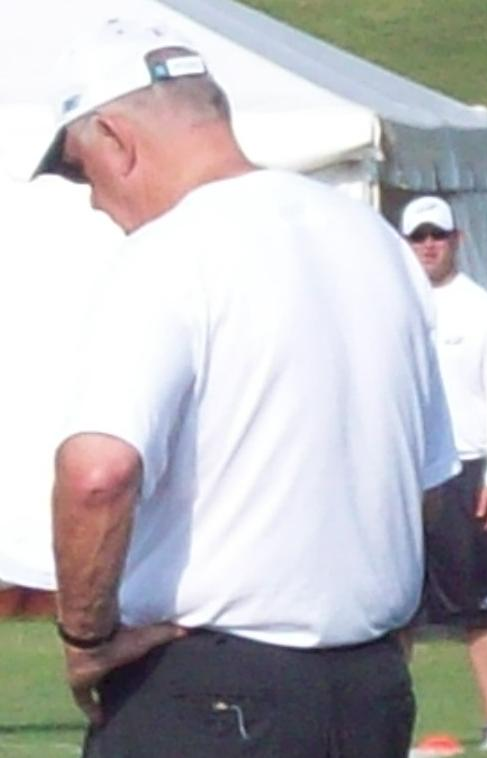
- Johnson at Eagles training camp in 2008

Profile
- Position: Tight end

Personal information
- Born: May 26, 1941; Maywood, Illinois, U.S.
- Died: July 28, 2009 (aged 68); Philadelphia, Pennsylvania, U.S.

Career information
- High school: Proviso East (Maywood, Illinois)
- College: Missouri (1959–1962)
- NFL draft: 1963: undrafted

Career history

Playing
- Buffalo Bills (1963–1964)

Coaching
- Missouri Southern (1967–1968) Head coach; Drake (1969–1972) Defensive coordinator; Indiana (1973–1976) Linebackers coach; Notre Dame (1977–1983); Defensive backs coach (1977–1980); Assistant head coach & defensive coordinator (1981–1983); Oklahoma Outlaws (1984) Defensive coordinator; Jacksonville Bulls (1985) Defensive coordinator; St. Louis/Phoenix Cardinals (1986–1993); Defensive line coach (1986–1989); Secondary coach (1990–1993); Indianapolis Colts (1994–1997); Linebackers coach (1994–1995); Defensive coordinator (1996–1997); Seattle Seahawks (1998) Linebackers coach; Philadelphia Eagles (1999–2008) Defensive coordinator

Awards and highlights
- Philadelphia Eagles Hall of Fame; National champion (1977)

Head coaching record
- Career: College: 10–9 (.526)
- Coaching profile at Pro Football Reference

Jim Johnson (May 26, 1941 – July 28, 2009) was an American professional football player and coach in the National Football League (NFL). He was a defensive coordinator for nine seasons with the Philadelphia Eagles. Widely regarded as one of the best defensive coordinators in NFL history, he was especially known for being a master architect of blitzes, disguising them skillfully and keeping offenses off balance.

Johnson played as a tight end for two years with the Buffalo Bills of the American Football League (AFL). In more than 40 years of coaching, he held head coaching duties only once (at the collegiate level), but was interviewed by the Arizona Cardinals regarding their head coaching vacancy in 2004.

== Playing career ==
A native of Maywood, Illinois, Johnson played high school football for Proviso East High School in Maywood, Illinois. He played college football for head coach Dan Devine at the University of Missouri from 1959 to 1962. An all-Big Eight quarterback, Johnson played in the same backfield with long-time NFL executive Bill Tobin. He went undrafted in the 1963 NFL draft, but was signed to play tight end by the Buffalo Bills of the AFL (1963–64).

== Coaching career ==
It was around 1994 or 1995, when I was with the Colts, and we were playing against San Francisco with Steve Young running the West Coast offense, releasing receivers all the time, guys getting by you. The idea was don't let these people dictate to you. You have to put more pressure [on the quarterback], and every year we tried to figure out how to do that.

— Jim Johnson, describing the origin of his defensive philosophy.

Johnson began his coaching career as head coach at Missouri Southern (1967–68), before serving four-year tenures at Drake University (1969–72) and Indiana University (1973–76). In 1977, Johnson was hired by his former head coach at Missouri, Dan Devine, as defensive backs coach at University of Notre Dame. After helping the 1977 Fighting Irish to win the national championship in his first year, Johnson was later promoted to defensive coordinator and assistant head coach under Gerry Faust.

Leaving Notre Dame in 1984, Johnson coached in the short-lived USFL with the Oklahoma Outlaws (1984) and Jacksonville Bulls (1985). In 1986, he finally entered the NFL as a coach, spending eight seasons with the St. Louis/Phoenix Cardinals (1986–93). After overseeing the Cards defensive line for four seasons, Johnson excelled as their secondary coach, helping Aeneas Williams become the first rookie cornerback to lead the league in interceptions (6) since 1981.

In 1994, he joined the Indianapolis Colts as linebackers coach under head coach Ted Marchibroda. After defensive coordinator Vince Tobin left the Colts in 1996 to become head coach of the Cardinals, Johnson was deemed his successor by new Colts head coach Lindy Infante. The Colts finished last in the AFC East in 1997, causing Infante and his staff to be fired.

Johnson spent the 1998 NFL season as linebackers coach on the final staff of Seattle Seahawks head coach Dennis Erickson, before leaving for Philadelphia. He helped the Seahawks register 10 TDs on defense, including 8 INTs returned for scores, 2nd most in NFL history. If Johnson had stayed, he could have stepped into the coordinator's role when Fritz Shurmur died of cancer that summer.

On January 22, 1999, Eagles head coach Andy Reid targeted and hired Jim Johnson as the Eagles new defensive coordinator. Johnson's tenure in Philadelphia was his most successful, as the Eagles won 5 division titles, each reaping the benefits of his defenses. Because head coach Andy Reid is known more for his acumen on the offensive side of the ball, he handed complete control of the defensive unit of the team to Johnson, allowing Reid to concentrate on running the offense with his offensive coordinators, Brad Childress and later Marty Mornhinweg.

Reid repeatedly said he had full confidence in Johnson and the Eagles rewarded him accordingly, as he became one of the highest paid coordinators in the NFL. "As I've said many times, Jim Johnson is the best in the business at what he does", said Reid upon signing his prized defensive coordinator to a lucrative four-year contract extension in 2005. "His defensive units continue to produce at a very high level as he puts a lot of pressure on opposing offenses." From 2000 to 2007, Johnson's units rank tied for first in the NFL with 342 sacks, second in the league in third down efficiency (34.3%) and red zone touchdown percentage (43.0%), and fourth in fewest points allowed (17.6 per game).

In 2001, Johnson's unit became the fourth team in NFL history to go all 16 games without allowing more than 21 points. Their streak of allowing 21 or fewer in 34 straight games was second longest in NFL history (Minnesota, 1968–71). In 1999, Johnson's unit forced an NFL-best 46 turnovers, including a team-record 5 interceptions returned for TDs.

Eagles defenders were selected for the Pro Bowl 26 times during Johnson's tenure. Former Eagle Brian Dawkins led the way with seven. Other Eagles defenders to go to the Pro Bowl under Johnson include Troy Vincent (five), Jeremiah Trotter (four), Hugh Douglas (three), Lito Sheppard (two), and Trent Cole, Michael Lewis, Asante Samuel, Corey Simon, Bobby Taylor (one each).

Notable coaches that coached under Johnson with the Eagles include John Harbaugh, Sean McDermott, Ron Rivera, and Steve Spagnuolo.

== Illness and death ==
Shortly after the Eagles were eliminated from the playoffs, on January 29, 2009, it was announced that Johnson was undergoing treatment for melanoma. In mid-May, Johnson announced a leave of absence due to the advancement of the cancer, with secondary coach Sean McDermott taking over duties as the interim defensive coordinator.

On July 24, 2009, Johnson officially resigned as defensive coordinator, with McDermott having the interim tag removed. Four days later, on July 28, 2009, Johnson died at the Hospital of the University of Pennsylvania at the age of 68.

== Head coaching record ==
=== Junior college ===
Year	Team	Overall	Conference	Standing	Bowl/playoffs
Missouri Southern Lions () (1967)
1967	Missouri Southern	8–1			
Missouri Southern:		8–1			
Total:		8–1			

=== College ===
Year	Team	Overall	Conference	Standing	Bowl/playoffs
Missouri Southern Lions (NAIA independent) (1968)
1968	Missouri Southern	2–8			
Missouri Southern:		2–8			
Total:		2–8			
