= Aeneas Williams =

American football player (born 1968)

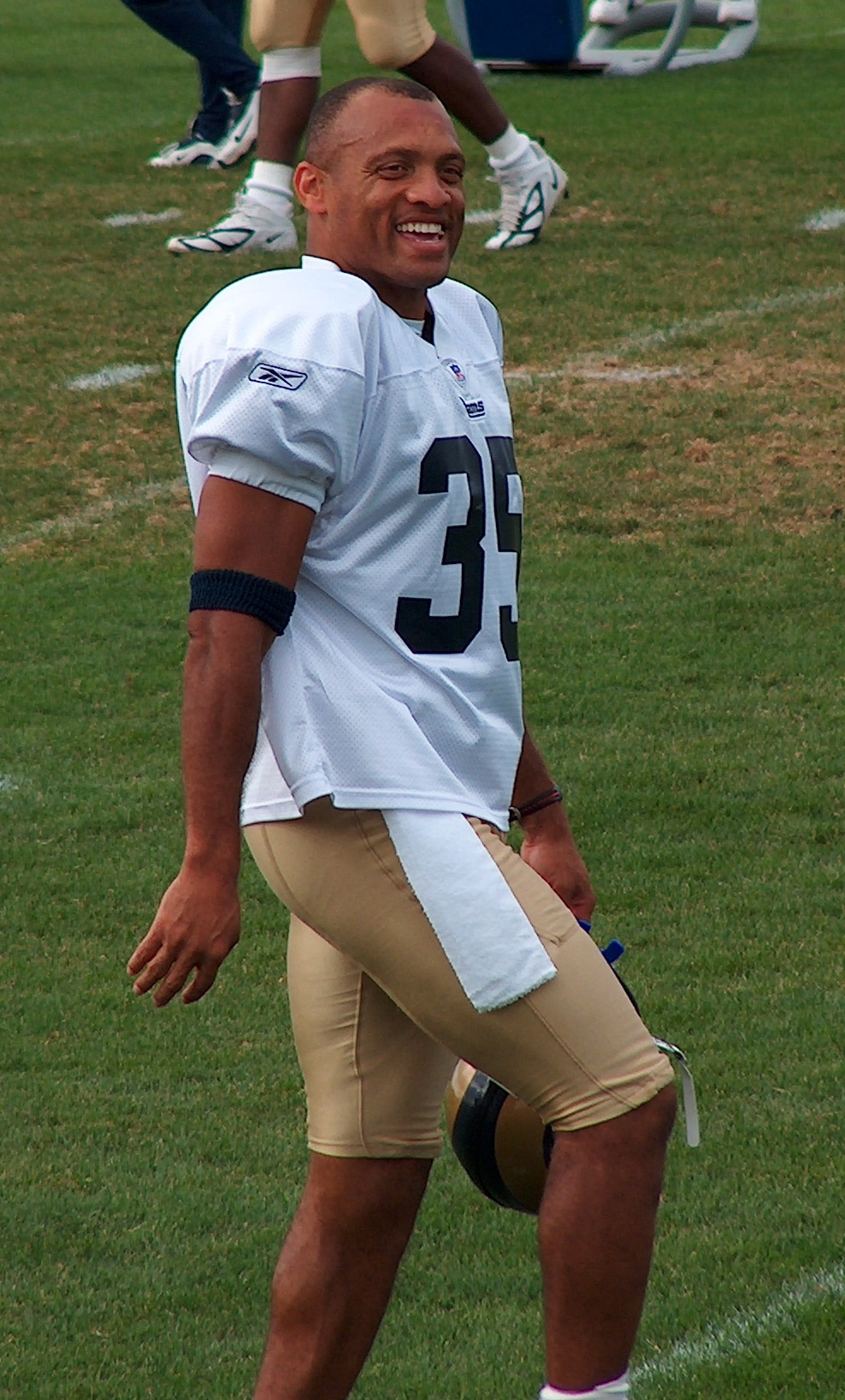
- Williams with the St. Louis Rams in 2004

No. 35
- Positions: Cornerback, safety

Personal information
- Born: January 29, 1968 (age 58); New Orleans, Louisiana, U.S.
- Listed height: 5 ft 11 in (1.80 m)
- Listed weight: 200 lb (91 kg)

Career information
- High school: Alcée Fortier (New Orleans)
- College: Southern (1988–1990)
- NFL draft: 1991: 3rd round, 59th overall pick

Career history
- Phoenix / Arizona Cardinals (1991–2000); St. Louis Rams (2001–2004)

Awards and highlights
- 3× First-team All-Pro (1995, 1997, 2001); 2× Second-team All-Pro (1994, 1996); 8× Pro Bowl (1994–1999, 2001, 2003); NFL interceptions co-leader (1994); NFL 1990s All-Decade Team; PFWA All-Rookie Team (1991); Arizona Cardinals Ring of Honor; St. Louis Rams 10th Anniversary Team

Career NFL statistics
- Tackles: 793
- Interceptions: 55
- Interception yards: 807
- Pass deflections: 48
- Forced fumbles: 8
- Fumble recoveries: 23
- Sacks: 3.0
- Total touchdowns: 13
- Stats at Pro Football Reference
- Pro Football Hall of Fame

Aeneas Demetrius Williams (/əˈniːəs/ un-NEE-us; born January 29, 1968) is an American former professional football player who was a cornerback and safety in the National Football League (NFL) for 14 seasons. He played college football for the Southern Jaguars and was selected in the third round of the 1991 NFL draft by the Phoenix Cardinals, where he spent 10 seasons. During his final four seasons, he was a member of the St. Louis Rams. Williams received eight Pro Bowl selections and three first-team All-Pro honors, as well as being on the second NFL 1990s All-Decade Team. He was inducted into the Pro Football Hall of Fame in 2014.

== Early life ==
Williams was born in New Orleans, Louisiana, to Lawrence and Lillian Williams. Aeneas is the youngest of 3 brothers, Malcolm and Achilles. He attended the now defunct Alcee Fortier High School, where he played football on a team with three future NFL players: Maurice Hurst, Kevin Lewis, and Ashley Ambrose. In 1985, the Fortier Tarpons went undefeated through 10 games and won the District 10-4A championship and proceeded to the Class 4A semifinals. Aeneas was selected to the all-district team as a strong safety that season.

== College career ==
Williams was not offered a scholarship when he graduated high school. He attended Southern University, the same school his brother Achilles attended, planning to simply get his accounting degree. "Our parents always expected that we would go to college and get our degree," he explained. "(Playing football) never crossed by mind, I was preparing for the rest of my life."

At Southern, he concentrated on his academics, not playing football until his junior year. Eventually, after being encouraged by his old high school teammate Maurice Hurst, he decided to join the team as a walk-on. He started out playing mostly on special teams, but made the starting lineup in the 5th game. Williams kept his involvement with the football team a secret from his family until he made the travel squad for the 2nd game of the season. In the following season, Williams was named to the All-Southwestern Athletic Conference team after leading the conference with seven interceptions. In 1990, Williams stayed on the team as a graduate student and fifth year senior in order to improve his draft status. He made the All-SWAC team again and tied the Division I-AA record for most interceptions with eleven.

Williams finished his college career with 20 interceptions and 28 pass deflections.

== Professional career ==
Pre-draft measurables
Height	Weight	Arm length	Hand span	40-yard dash	10-yard split	20-yard split	20-yard shuttle	Vertical jump	Broad jump	Bench press
5 ft 10 in (1.78 m)	187 lb (85 kg)	30 1/2 in (0.77 m)	8 7/8 in (0.23 m)	4.57 s	1.62 s	2.68 s	4.30 s	32.0 in (0.81 m)	9 ft 3 in (2.82 m)	12 reps
All values from NFL Combine

=== Phoenix/Arizona Cardinals ===
==== 1991 ====
The Phoenix Cardinals selected Williams in the third round (59th overall) of the 1991 NFL draft. He was the sixth cornerback selected. He became Southern's ninth highest player selected in the history of the NFL Draft and their 55th player selected in the draft since 1967.

On July 19, 1991, the Cardinals signed Williams to a three–year, $960,000 rookie contract that included a signing bonus of $200,000. Throughout training camp, Williams competed against Cedric Mack, Robert Massey, and Jay Taylor to be the No. 1 starting cornerback under new defensive coordinator Fritz Shurmur. On August 23, 1991, the Phoenix Cardinals unexpectedly cut Cedric Mack as part of their final roster cuts. Head coach Joe Bugel named Williams and Robert Massey as the starting cornerbacks to begin the season.

On September 1, 1991, Williams made his professional regular season debut and earned his first career start in the Phoenix Cardinals' season-opener at the Los Angeles Rams and recorded three solo tackles and had his first career interception on a pass thrown by Jim Everett as they won 24–14. The following week, he recorded three solo tackles, set a season-high with two fumble recoveries, and intercepted a pass running back Keith Byars attempted to throw as he was hit by linebacker Garth Jax during a 26–10 win at the Philadelphia Eagles in Week 2. In Week 12, he set a season-high with nine combined tackles (eight solo) during a 10–14 loss at the San Francisco 49ers. The following week, Williams recorded four solo tackles, set a season-high with three pass deflections, and intercepted a pass by Jim McMahon as the Cardinals lost 34–14 to the Philadelphia Eagles in Week 13. On December 15, 1991, Williams made four solo tackles, two pass deflections, and set a season-high with two interceptions on passes thrown by John Elway during a 19–24 loss at the Denver Broncos. He finished his rookie season with 66 combined tackles (58 solo), 10 pass deflections, six interceptions, and two fumble recoveries in 16 games and 15 starts. His six interceptions tied for the most in the NFC in 1991, alongside Deion Sanders, Tim McKyer, and Ray Crockett.

==== 1992 ====
He returned to training camp slated as the No. 1 starting cornerback with Robert Massey and Lorenzo Lynch competing for the other starting role. Head coach Joe Bugel named Williams and Lorenzo Lynch the starting cornerbacks to begin the season. Prior to Week 4, defensive coordinator Fritz Shurmur demoted Lorenzo Lynch to a backup and replaced him in the starting lineup with Robert Massey for the rest of the season. On November 22, 1992, Williams set a season-high with seven combined tackles (six solo), made one pass deflection, and intercepted a pass attempt by Troy Aikman during a 16–10 loss against the Dallas Cowboys. He started all 16 games throughout the 1992 NFL season for the first time in his career and made 50 combined tackles (39 solo), 10 pass deflections, and three interceptions.

==== 1993 ====
He returned to training camp slated as the de facto No. 1 starting cornerback. Robert Massey was a contract holdout and would miss the entire preseason as well as the first seven games of the season. Head coach Joe Bugel named Williams and Lorenzo Lynch as the starting cornerbacks to begin the season.

On September 5, 1993, Williams started in the Phoenix Cardinals' season-opener at the Philadelphia Eagles and set a season-high with six solo tackles and made one pass deflection as they lost 17–23. On October 31, 1993, Williams made six combined tackles (five solo), one pass deflection, and scored a career-high two touchdowns on an interception return and a return on a fumble recovery during a 20–17 loss against the New Orleans Saints. He scored the first touchdown of his career in the first quarter after recovering a fumble by wide receiver Quinn Early and returning it 20–yards for a touchdown. The first pick-six of his career occurred in the second quarter after he intercepted a pass Wade Wilson threw to wide receiver Eric Martin and returned it 46–yards for a touchdown. The following game, Williams recorded three combined tackles (two solo), set a season-high with two pass deflections, and intercepted a pass by Ken O'Brien as the Cardinals defeated the Philadelphia Eagles 3–16 in Week 10. He started all 16 games throughout the 1993 NFL season and made 47 combined tackles (43 solo), 12 pass deflections, two interceptions, two touchdowns, and one fumble recovery. He was selected to play in the 1994 Pro Bowl to mark the first Pro Bowl selection of his career.

==== 1994 ====
On January 24, 1994, the Arizona Cardinals fired head coach Joe Bugel after they ended the 1993 NFL season with a 7–9 record. On February 3, 1994, the Cardinals hired former Philadelphia Eagles' head coach Buddy Ryan to takeover as their new head coach. On February 17, 1994, the Arizona Cardinals signed Williams to a two–year, $3 million contract extension that included a signing bonus of $900,000.

Entering training camp, Williams remained as the No. 1 starting cornerback under the new defensive coordinator Ronnie Jones. Head coach Buddy Ryan named Williams and James Williams the starting cornerbacks to begin the season.

On September 18, 1994, Williams made five solo tackles, one pass break-up, and had his first interception of the season on a pass Vinny Testaverde threw to wide receiver Mark Carrier during a 0–32 loss at the Cleveland Browns. On October 16, 1994, Williams made two solo tackles, two pass deflections, and set a season-high with two interceptions on pass attempts thrown by Heath Shuler during a 19–16 overtime victory at the Washington Redskins. In Week 12, he recorded two solo tackles, set a season-high with three pass deflections, and intercepted a pass Randall Cunningham threw to wide receiver Fred Barnett as the Cardinals defeated the Philadelphia Eagles 6–12. On December 11, 1994, Williams made five solo tackles, one pass deflection, and made his ninth interception of the season on a pass thrown by Heath Shuler to wide receiver Olanda Truitt as the Cardinals defeated the Washington Redskins 15–17. He started all 16 games for the third consecutive season and made 42 combined tackles (40 solo). He set a new career-high in interceptions (9) and passes defended (26).

==== 1995 ====
Head coach Buddy Ryan named Williams the No. 1 starting cornerback to begin the season, but paired him with Patrick Hunter following the departure of James Williams. On October 15, 1995, Williams recorded three solo tackles, set a season-high with four pass deflections, and returned an interception by Gus Frerotte to wide receiver Michael Westbrook for a 28–yard touchdown as the Cardinals defeated the Washington Redskins 20–24. On December 9, 1995, Williams made six solo tackles, two pass deflections, and set a season-high with two interceptions on passes thrown by Stan Humphries during a 25–28 loss at the San Diego Chargers. In Week 17, he set a season-high with nine combined tackles (six solo), had one pass break-up, and intercepted a pass attempt thrown by Troy Aikman to wide receiver Michael Irvin and returned it 48–yards for a touchdown during a 37–13 loss against the Dallas Cowboys. On December 27, 1995, the Arizona Cardinals announced their decision to fire head coach Buddy Ryan after they finished the 1995 NFL season with a 4–12 record. He started all 16 games and made 62 combined tackles (52 solo), 22 pass deflections, six interceptions, three fumble recoveries, and scored two touchdowns.

==== 1996 ====
On February 26, 1996, the Arizona Cardinals re-signed Williams to a six–year, $17 million contract extension that included a signing bonus of $6 million. The Cardinals had hired Vince Tobin earlier in the month to be the new head coach. Following the departures of Lorenzo Lynch and Patrick Hunter, Williams was projected to begin the season alongside Tito Paul. On August 27, 1996, the Cardinals claimed cornerback Ronnie Bradford off waivers after he was cut by the Denver Broncos. Head coach Vince Tobin named Williams the No. 1 starting cornerback to begin the season and chose to start safety Brent Alexander alongside him as the No. 2 starting cornerback for the first two games. Defensive coordinator Dave McGinnis elected to promote Ronnie Bradford to the No. 2 starting cornerback beginning in Week 3.

On October 27, 1996, Williams made seven combined tackles (six solo), two pass deflections, and set a season-high with two interceptions thrown by Frank Reich as the Cardinals lost 31–21 against the New York Jets to give them their first win of the season after eight consecutive losses. On November 17, 1996, Williams made eight combined tackles (six solo), two pass deflections, and intercepted a pass by Dave Brown as the Cardinals defeated the New York Giants 23–31. The following week, he recorded seven combined tackles (five solo), two pass deflections, one interception, and had his first career sack on Ty Detmer for a six–yard loss during a 30–36 victory against the Philadelphia Eagles in Week 13. In Week 15, he set a season-high with nine solo tackles and had two pass break-ups during a 6–10 loss to the Dallas Cowboys. On December 22, 1996, Williams made two solo tackles, one pass deflection, and had a pick-six on an interception he returned for a 65–yard touchdown that was thrown by Ty Detmer during a 19–29 loss at the Philadelphia Eagles. He started all 16 games for the fifth consecutive season and set a career-high with 77 combined tackles (65 solo) while also recording 18 pass deflections, six interceptions, one sack, and one touchdown.

==== 1997 ====
The Arizona Cardinals selected cornerbacks Tom Knight in the first-round (9th overall) and Ty Howard in the third-round (84th overall) of the 1997 NFL draft following the departure of Ronnie Bradford. Head coach Vince Tobin named Williams the No. 1 starting cornerback to begin the season and paired him with rookie Tom Knight.

On September 28, 1997, Williams recorded five solo tackles, set a season-high with three pass deflections, and returned an interception by Trent Dilfer 42–yards for a touchdown during an 18–19 loss at the Tampa Bay Buccaneers. In Week 7, Williams made six combined tackles (five solo), two pass deflections, and had his second pick-six of the season after intercepting a pass by Danny Kanell to wide receiver Amani Toomer during a 27–13 loss against the New York Giants. The following week, he set a season-high with seven combined tackles (four solo) and made one pass deflection during a 10–13 overtime loss at the Philadelphia Eagles in Week 8. In Week 16, he made two solo tackles, a pass deflection, and had his sixth interception of the season on a pass by Billy Joe Hobert to wide receiver Andre Hastings during a 10–24 loss at the New Orleans Saints. He started all 16 games and recorded 62 combined tackles (48 solo), 18 pass deflections, six interceptions, two touchdowns, and a forced fumble.

==== 1998 ====
The Cardinals selected cornerback Corey Chavous in the second-round (33rd overall) of the 1998 NFL draft. Head coach Vince Tobin named Williams and Tom Knight the starting cornerbacks to begin the season. On September 6, 1998, Williams started in the Cardinals' season-opener at the Dallas Cowboys and set a season-high with 11 combined tackles (10 solo) as they lost 10–38. In Week 4, Tom Knight suffered a hamstring injury and remained inactive for the next four games (Weeks 5–9) and was replaced by J. B. Brown. In Week 6, Williams made one tackle, a pass deflection, and had his lone interception of the season on a pass Erik Kramer threw to wide receiver Curtis Conway as the Cardinals defeated the Chicago Bears 7–20. Defensive coordinator Dave McGinnis named Corey Chavous the No. 2 starting cornerback for the last five games of the season. He started all 16 games for the seventh consecutive season and recorded 70 combined tackles (52 solo), seven pass deflections, one sack, and made one interception.

The Arizona Cardinals finished the 1998 NFL season with a 9–7 record, marking the only time they had a winning record during Williams' entire 10–seasons. On January 2, 1999, Williams started in the first playoff game of his career and recorded two solo tackles and had a game–high two interceptions on passes thrown by Troy Aikman during a 20–7 victory at the Dallas Cowboys in the NFC Wild-Card Game. On January 10, 1999, Williams started in the Divisional Round at the Minnesota Vikings and recorded two solo tackles and intercepted a pass Randall Cunningham threw to Randy Moss as the Cardinals lost 21–41.

==== 1999 ====
He returned as the No. 1 starting cornerback to begin the season and was paired with Corey Chavous. On September 12, 1999, Williams started in the Arizona Cardinals' season-opener at the Philadelphia Eagles and recorded one solo tackle, set a season-high with three pass deflections, and intercepted a pass Doug Pederson threw to wide receiver Torrance Small as they won 25–24. The following week, he set a season-high with five solo tackles during a 16–19 loss at the Miami Dolphins in Week 2. On September 27, 1999, Williams and the Cardinals appeared on nationally televised Monday Night Football against the San Francisco 49ers. During the end of the second quarter, Williams unfortunately delivered the career-ending hit to Hall of Fame quarterback Steve Young as he threw a pass. Williams came in freely unblocked on a blindside cornerback blitz on Young after running back Lawrence Phillips failed his assignment of picking up any incoming blitzes. At the same time, cornerback J. J. McCleskey blitzed on the broadside of Young, ran by guard Dave Fiore, and dove for a tackle as Young threw a pass, but would only hit Young's lower legs. With Aeneas Williams simultaneously hitting Young in the chest, the combined force would send Young falling backwards with the back of his head slamming into the turf and left Young unconscious on the field for several minutes. Young would not return after halftime and was replaced by Jeff Garcia as the 49ers defeated the Cardinals 24–10. Young suffered his fourth severe concussion from the impact in only three years and had continual symptoms of post-concussion syndrome that would immediately end his career and force his retirement. He started all 16 games during the 1999 NFL season and recorded 55 combined tackles (50 solo), seven pass deflections, two interceptions, two forced fumbles, and one fumble recovery. Following the season, he received the Bart Starr Award.

==== 2000 ====
Head coach Vince Tobin retained Williams and Tom Knight as the starting cornerbacks to begin the season. On October 23, 2000, the Arizona Cardinals fired head coach Vince Tobin after starting with a 2–5 record and appointed defensive coordinator Dave McGinnis to interim head coach for the remainder of the season. On November 5, 2000, Williams made two solo tackles, two pass deflections, and interception, and returned a fumble that linebacker Mark Maddox forced by running back Stephen Davis 104–yards for a touchdown as the Cardinals defeated the Washington Redskins 16–15. His fumble recovery returned 104–yards for a touchdown tied Oakland Raiders' safety Jack Tatum (1972). In Week 15, he set a season-high with six solo tackles during a 10–44 loss at the Jacksonville Jaguars. On December 24, 2000, Williams recorded six combined tackles (three solo), two pass deflections, and set a season-high with two interceptions on passes thrown by Brad Johnson during a 3–20 loss at the Washington Redskins. He started all 16 games throughout the 2000 NFL season and finished with 62 combined tackles (48 solo), 11 pass deflections, five interceptions, two forced fumbles, two fumble recoveries, and one touchdown.

On February 22, 2001, the Arizona Cardinals designated their franchise tag to Williams as both parties were still unable to reach an agreement on a contract extension. The franchise tag was for a fully-guaranteed one–year, $4.18 million contract for the 2001 NFL season.

=== St. Louis Rams ===
==== 2001 ====
On April 21, 2001, the St. Louis Rams traded a second (54th overall) and fourth-round pick (121st overall) in the 2001 NFL draft to the Arizona Cardinals in return for Williams. The Rams acquired Williams to replace starting cornerback Todd Lyght after he signed with the Detroit Lions ten days earlier.

On April 25, 2001, the St. Louis Rams signed Williams to a three–year, $14.70 million contract extension that included $7.70 million guaranteed and an initial signing bonus of $3.60 million. He entered training camp slated as the de facto No. 1 starting cornerback under defensive coordinator Lovie Smith. Head coach Mike Martz named Williams and Dexter McCleon as the starting cornerbacks to begin the season, alongside nickelback Dre Bly.

On September 30, 2001, he set a season-high with eight combined tackles (seven solo) and made one fumble recovery during a 42–10 loss to the Miami Dolphins. On October 21, 2001, Williams made eight combined tackles (five solo), one pass deflection, and returned an interception on a pass by Vinny Testaverde 42–yards for a touchdown during a 34–14 victory at the New York Jets. In Week 9, he made one solo tackle, one pass deflection, and had his second pick-six of the season after intercepting a pass Matt Lytle threw to wide receiver Donald Hayes and returning it for a 16–yard touchdown during a 14–48 victory against the Carolina Panthers. In Week 13, Williams recorded four solo tackles, three pass deflections, and set a season-high with two interceptions on passes thrown by Jeff Garcia to wide receivers Terrell Owens and Tai Streets as the Rams defeated the San Francisco 49ers 14–27. He started all 16 games for the tenth consecutive season and made 73 combined tackles (56 solo), 18 pass deflections, four forced fumbles, four interceptions, and returned two interceptions for touchdowns.

==== 2003 ====
Due to roster concerns, Williams switched to free safety. As one of the leaders of a much-improved defense, Williams got a chance to play in the postseason for only the second time in his career. In the Rams' divisional playoff game against the Green Bay Packers prior to the Super Bowl, he returned two interceptions from Packers quarterback Brett Favre for touchdowns and recovered a fumble. Then in the NFC title game, he intercepted a pass from Philadelphia Eagles quarterback Donovan McNabb, with 2 minutes left in regulation, clinching the game and ensuring the Rams' berth in Super Bowl XXXVI. However, the Rams lost that game to the New England Patriots.

On March 24, 2003, the St. Louis Rams signed Williams to a two–year, $6.50 million contract that includes a $1 million signing bonus.

==== 2004–2005 ====
After a lackluster season, in which he ended on the injured reserve list, Williams quietly retired during the 2005 offseason. Over his career he accumulated a staggering 12 defensive touchdowns (9 interceptions returned for a touchdown, and 3 fumbles recovered for touchdowns), and 55 career interceptions, cementing his place as one of the most dominating defensive backs of his era. He also recovered 23 fumbles and gained 1,075 total defensive return yards (807 from interceptions and 268 from fumbles). He was also a 4-time All-Pro selection.

Although Williams only played on a playoff team four times in 14 years (three of which were with the Rams), he made the most of his postseason opportunities when they occurred, intercepting 6 passes and recovering one fumble in his first four playoff games.

== NFL career statistics ==
Legend
	Led the league
**Bold**	Career high

=== Regular season ===
Year	Team	Games		Tackles				Interceptions				Fumbles			
Year	Team	GP	GS	Comb	Solo	Ast	Sck	Int	Yds	TD	Lng	FF	FR	Yds	TD
1991	PHX	16	15	48	48	0	0.0	6	60	0	32	0	2	10	0
1992	PHX	16	16	48	48	0	0.0	3	25	0	23	0	1	39	0
1993	PHX	16	16	42	42	0	0.0	2	87	1	46	0	2	20	**1**
1994	ARI	16	16	41	40	1	0.0	**9**	89	0	43	0	1	0	0
1995	ARI	16	16	62	52	10	0.0	6	86	**2**	48	0	3	0	0
1996	ARI	16	16	**77**	**65**	12	**1.0**	6	89	1	**65**	0	1	0	0
1997	ARI	16	16	63	49	14	0.0	6	95	**2**	42	1	0	0	0
1998	ARI	16	16	70	57	13	**1.0**	1	15	0	15	0	0	0	0
1999	ARI	16	16	55	50	5	0.0	2	5	0	8	1	2	0	0
2000	ARI	16	16	62	48	14	0.0	5	**102**	0	48	**2**	2	**104**	**1**
2001	STL	16	16	73	56	**17**	0.0	4	69	**2**	42	1	**4**	0	0
2002	STL	6	6	29	23	6	0.0	1	3	0	3	0	1	2	0
2003	STL	16	16	75	60	15	**1.0**	4	82	1	46	1	**4**	93	**1**
2004	STL	13	10	48	40	8	0.0	0	0	0	0	**2**	0	0	0
		211	207	793	678	115	3.0	55	807	9	65	8	23	268	3

=== Postseason ===
Year	Team	Games		Tackles				Interceptions				Fumbles			
Year	Team	GP	GS	Comb	Solo	Ast	Sck	Int	Yds	TD	Lng	FF	FR	Yds	TD
1998	ARI	2	2	4	4	0	0.0	**3**	47	0	**47**	0	0	0	0
2001	STL	3	3	**23**	**20**	**3**	0.0	**3**	**61**	**2**	32	**1**	**1**	0	0
2003	STL	1	1	7	6	1	0.0	0	0	0	0	0	0	0	0
		6	6	34	30	4	0.0	6	108	2	47	1	1	0	0

== Post-playing career ==
Williams was inducted into the Arizona Cardinals' Ring of Honor during the 2008–2009 football season during halftime of the Monday Night Football game against the San Francisco 49ers November 10, 2008. On January 18, 2009, he was chosen to present the George Halas Trophy to the Arizona Cardinals after their victory in the NFC Championship game, resulting in the Cardinals first trip to the Super Bowl. He made his final appearance in a football videogame in NFL Street 2, which was released in 2004.

Williams is the founding pastor of The Spirit Church (formerly Spirit of the Lord Family Church), which began in 2007, located in St. Ann, a suburb of St. Louis. He and his wife, Tracy, have three daughters—Saenea, Tirzah, and Cheyenne—and a son, Lazarus.

Williams was a finalist for the Pro Football Hall of Fame classes of 2012 and 2013 but did not get voted in on the final ballots both times. He was elected to the Pro Football Hall of Fame on February 1, 2014, and inducted on August 2.

On September 24, 2014, Williams was inducted into the St. Louis Sports Hall of Fame.
