= Bill Tobin (American football) =

American football player and executive (1941–2024)

No. 47, 25, 48
- Position: Running back

Personal information
- Born: February 16, 1941; Burlington Junction, Missouri, U.S.
- Died: April 19, 2024 (aged 83); Indianapolis, Indiana, U.S.
- Listed height: 5 ft 11 in (1.80 m)
- Listed weight: 210 lb (95 kg)

Career information
- High school: Maryville (Maryville, Missouri)
- College: Missouri
- NFL draft: 1963: 14th round, 189th overall pick

Career history

Playing
- Houston Oilers (1963); Edmonton Eskimos (1964–1965); Orlando Panthers (1966-1967)

Coaching
- Orlando Panthers (1967) Offensive backfield coach

Operations
- Chicago Bears (1987–1992) Director of player personnel; Indianapolis Colts (1994–1996) General manager; Detroit Lions (2001–2002) Director of player personnel

Career AFL statistics
- Rushing yards: 271
- Rushing average: 3.6
- Receptions: 13
- Receiving yards: 173
- Total touchdowns: 5
- Stats at Pro Football Reference
- Executive profile at Pro Football Reference

William Hugh Tobin (February 16, 1941 – April 19, 2024) was an American professional football player and executive in the National Football League (NFL). Tobin played running back for one season with the Houston Oilers. He later became director of player personnel for the Chicago Bears in 1987 and the Detroit Lions in 2001 and the general manager of the Indianapolis Colts in 1994.

== Early life and education ==
William Hugh Tobin was born on February 16, 1941, in Maryville, Missouri, on a farm near Burlington Junction, Missouri, where his brother Vince was also born. Their father Ed Tobin was a basketball captain at the Conception Junction, Missouri high school. The brothers both attended Maryville High School, 16 miles (26 kilometers) from Burlington Junction, but the family thought their sports prospects would be much better in the much bigger school (they commuted to the school). The brothers, who were two years apart in age, played on the football teams at the same time both in Maryville and at the University of Missouri football team. Bill played on the 1959 Maryville basketball team that was undefeated until losing the State Class M title game.

Tobin attended the University of Missouri, where he played in the Tigers' backfield next to quarterback Jim Johnson.

== Career ==
=== As a player ===
Tobin was drafted in the 14th round of the 1963 NFL draft by the San Francisco 49ers. Instead of playing for the 49ers, he played for the Houston Oilers in the AFL for one season and then played in the CFL for a few seasons.

=== As an executive ===
Tobin spent 27 years as a front office executive with the Chicago Bears, Indianapolis Colts and Detroit Lions. Tobin was involved in drafting six Hall of Famers who played for the 1985 Chicago Bears. He was named the director of player personnel for the Bears in 1987. His first draft pick as director of player personnel was Jim Harbaugh. The Bears had four playoff appearances while Tobin was director of player personnel. His tenure as Chicago's director of player personnel ended in 1992.

Tobin was the general manager of the Indianapolis Colts from 1994 to 1996. During his time with the Colts, he drafted future Hall of Famers Marshall Faulk and Marvin Harrison. He also drafted Ken Dilger, Tarik Glenn, and Adam Meadows, who would be cornerstones of the Colts offensive line, and Pro Bowl defensive backs Ray Buchanan and Ashley Ambrose. He built a team in Indianapolis that included Jim Harbaugh, who in 1995 led the NFL in passing. The Colts had a very surprising and successful run to the 1995 AFC Championship Game; the run included the first playoff win for the Colts since Super Bowl V, a span of twenty-five years. Tobin was replaced as Colts general manager in 1997 by Bill Polian.

Tobin was the director of player personnel for the Detroit Lions from 2001 to 2002.

Tobin worked as a scout for the Cincinnati Bengals for two decades. His son, Duke Tobin, is the team's director of player personnel. Tobin was the brother of former NFL coach Vince Tobin.

== Mel Kiper incident ==
While he was the general manager of the Indianapolis Colts, Tobin gained some notoriety during the television broadcast of the 1994 NFL draft after being criticized by ESPN analyst Mel Kiper Jr. for picking Nebraska linebacker Trev Alberts with the fifth pick in the draft (that year, the Colts had both the 2nd and 5th pick, with the Colts drafting Marshall Faulk prior to Alberts), instead of Fresno State quarterback Trent Dilfer. While he was being interviewed by ESPN later in the broadcast, Tobin famously said "Who in the hell is Mel Kiper anyway?!" Tobin later called a press conference where he ranted about Kiper for several minutes, stating that Kiper had been biased against the Colts ever since they moved from Baltimore, Kiper's home.

== Death ==
Tobin died in Indianapolis on April 19, 2024, at age 83.
