= 1992 All-Independent Football Alliance football team =

American college football season

The 1992 All-Independent football Alliance Team consists of American football players chosen by the Associated Press for their All-IFA teams for the 1992 NCAA Division I-A football season.

== Offense ==
=== Quarterback ===
- Steve Matthews, Memphis (AP-1)
- Michael Anderson, East Carolina (AP-2)

=== Running backs ===
- Michael Welch, Southern Miss (AP-1)
- Junior Smith, East Carolina (AP-1)

=== Wide receivers ===
- Russell Copeland, Memphis (AP-1)
- Wayde Butler, Southwestern Louisiana (AP-1)
- Marlon Pearce, Cincinnati (AP-2)
- Corey Parham, Louisiana Tech (AP-2)

=== Tight ends ===
- Carlester Crumpler, East Carolina (AP-1)
- Marcus Pope, Southern Miss (AP-2)
- Ryan McGrath, Southwestern Louisiana

=== Offensive tackles ===
- Willie Roaf, Louisiana Tech (AP-1)
- Tom Scott, East Carolina (AP-1)

=== Offensive guards ===
- Jeff King, Memphis (AP-1)
- Leon Anderson, Southern Miss (AP-1)
- George McReynolds, East Carolina (AP-2)

=== Centers ===
- Larry Bolton, Memphis (AP-1)

== Defense ==
=== Defensive linemen ===
- Chris Hobbs, Memphis (AP-1)
- Artie Smith, Louisiana Tech (AP-1)
- Bernard Carter, East Carolina (AP-1)
- James Atkins, Southwestern Louisiana (AP-1)
- Bobby Hamilton, Southern Miss (AP-2)
- Michael Tobías (AP-2)

=== Linebackers ===
- Tyrone Nix, Southern Miss (AP-1)
- Myron Baker, Louisiana Tech (AP-1)
- Danton Barto, Memphis (AP-1)
- Jerry Dillon, East Carolina (AP-2)

=== Defensive backs ===
- Perry Carter, Southern Miss (AP-1)
- Terryl Ulmer, Southern Miss (AP-1)
- Ray Buchanan, Louisville (AP-1)
- Mike Staid, Tulane (AP-1)
- Doug Evans, Louisiana Tech (AP-2)
- Greg Grandison, East Carolina (AP-2)
- Alan Fletcher, Cincinnati (AP-2)

== Special teams ==
=== Kicker ===
- Joe Allison, Memphis (AP-1)

=== Punter ===
- Jeff Buffaloe, Memphis (AP-1)
