= List of Southern Jaguars in the NFL draft =

This is a list of Southern Jaguars football players in the NFL draft.

== Key ==
| B | Back | K | Kicker | NT | Nose tackle |
| C | Center | LB | Linebacker | FB | Fullback |
| DB | Defensive back | P | Punter | HB | Halfback |
| DE | Defensive end | QB | Quarterback | WR | Wide receiver |
| DT | Defensive tackle | RB | Running back | G | Guard |
| E | End | T | Offensive tackle | TE | Tight end |

== Selections ==
| Year | Round | Pick | Overall | Player | Team | Position |
|---|---|---|---|---|---|---|
| 1951 | 15 | 9 | 180 | Obie Posey | Los Angeles Rams | B |
| 1955 | 29 | 7 | 344 | Harold Jackson | New York Giants | B |
| 1959 | 16 | 4 | 184 | George McGee | Detroit Lions | T |
| 1959 | 23 | 3 | 267 | Dick Williams | Philadelphia Eagles | E |
| 1960 | 13 | 12 | 156 | Jim Varnado | New York Giants | RB |
| 1962 | 6 | 4 | 74 | Donnie Davis | Dallas Cowboys | E |
| 1964 | 12 | 12 | 166 | Ed Mitchell | Cleveland Browns | T |
| 1964 | 16 | 12 | 222 | Sid Williams | Cleveland Browns | LB |
| 1964 | 18 | 8 | 246 | Alvin Haymond | Baltimore Colts | RB |
| 1965 | 16 | 3 | 213 | Frank Pitts | Chicago Bears | WR |
| 1966 | 6 | 10 | 90 | Jim Battle | Cleveland Browns | DE |
| 1966 | 10 | 14 | 154 | Sam Montgomery | Green Bay Packers | DE |
| 1967 | 6 | 3 | 136 | Pete Barnes | Houston Oilers | LB |
| 1967 | 12 | 21 | 311 | Bob Bonner | Buffalo Bills | DT |
| 1968 | 5 | 27 | 138 | Al Beauchamp | Cincinnati Bengals | LB |
| 1968 | 6 | 20 | 158 | Elmo Malple | Cincinnati Bengals | WR |
| 1968 | 9 | 18 | 237 | Grundy Harris | San Diego Chargers | RB |
| 1968 | 14 | 18 | 372 | Harvey Nairn | New York Jets | RB |
| 1968 | 14 | 21 | 375 | Robert Holmes | Kansas City Chiefs | RB |
| 1969 | 2 | 19 | 45 | Richard Neal | New Orleans Saints | DE |
| 1969 | 6 | 9 | 139 | Harold McLinton | Washington Redskins | LB |
| 1969 | 9 | 18 | 226 | Joe Williams | San Diego Chargers | DB |
| 1969 | 16 | 2 | 392 | Tom McClinton | Philadelphia Eagles | DB |
| 1969 | 16 | 9 | 399 | Mike Washington | Washington Redskins | LB |
| 1969 | 16 | 18 | 408 | Willie Davenport | San Diego Chargers | WR |
| 1970 | 2 | 8 | 34 | Raymond Jones | Philadelphia Eagles | DB |
| 1970 | 2 | 11 | 37 | Alden Roche | Denver Broncos | DE |
| 1970 | 3 | 1 | 53 | Mel Blount | Pittsburgh Steelers | DB |
| 1970 | 4 | 15 | 93 | Ken Ellis | Green Bay Packers | WR |
| 1970 | 8 | 26 | 208 | Lew Porter | Denver Broncos | RB |
| 1970 | 12 | 10 | 296 | Willie Davenport | New Orleans Saints | DB |
| 1971 | 1 | 10 | 10 | Isiah Robertson | Los Angeles Rams | LB |
| 1971 | 5 | 12 | 116 | Donnell Smith | Green Bay Packers | DE |
| 1971 | 7 | 5 | 161 | Harold Carmichael | Philadelphia Eagles | WR |
| 1971 | 8 | 12 | 194 | James Elder | New Orleans Saints | DB |
| 1972 | 3 | 19 | 71 | Allen Dunbar | San Francisco 49ers | WR |
| 1972 | 7 | 26 | 182 | Jim Osborne | Chicago Bears | DT |
| 1972 | 8 | 16 | 198 | Henry Brandon | Atlanta Falcons | RB |
| 1972 | 9 | 3 | 211 | Ed Richardson | New York Giants | RB |
| 1972 | 11 | 24 | 284 | Willie McKelton | Minnesota Vikings | DB |
| 1972 | 17 | 11 | 427 | LaVerne Dickinson | Chicago Bears | DB |
| 1973 | 13 | 11 | 323 | Rod Milburn | Los Angeles Rams | WR |
| 1973 | 14 | 14 | 352 | Eddie Bishop | Minnesota Vikings | DB |
| 1973 | 17 | 20 | 436 | Harold Sampson | Green Bay Packers | DT |
| 1974 | 3 | 6 | 58 | Godwin Turk | New York Jets | LB |
| 1974 | 10 | 14 | 248 | Charles Johnson | Denver Broncos | DB |
| 1974 | 15 | 6 | 370 | Willie Brister | New York Jets | TE |
| 1975 | 7 | 25 | 181 | Henry Green | Minnesota Vikings | RB |
| 1975 | 15 | 9 | 373 | Randy Allen | Green Bay Packers | WR |
| 1976 | 7 | 20 | 202 | Perry Brooks | New England Patriots | DT |
| 1976 | 9 | 25 | 262 | Isaac Hagins | Minnesota Vikings | WR |
| 1977 | 9 | 20 | 243 | Johnnie Jackson | St. Louis Cardinals | DT |
| 1978 | 6 | 16 | 154 | Conrad Rucker | Houston Oilers | TE |
| 1978 | 11 | 5 | 283 | Nathan Besaint | New Orleans Saints | DT |
| 1980 | 5 | 2 | 112 | Kenneth Times | San Francisco 49ers | DT |
| 1980 | 6 | 1 | 139 | Herb Williams | San Francisco 49ers | DB |
| 1980 | 9 | 27 | 248 | George Farmer | Los Angeles Rams | WR |
| 1981 | 5 | 7 | 118 | James Davis | Oakland Raiders | DB |
| 1981 | 12 | 16 | 320 | Brian Williams | Minnesota Vikings | TE |
| 1987 | 10 | 20 | 271 | James Evans | Kansas City Chiefs | RB |
| 1988 | 2 | 18 | 45 | Gerald Perry | Denver Broncos | T |
| 1988 | 4 | 22 | 104 | Michael Ball | Indianapolis Colts | DB |
| 1988 | 10 | 27 | 276 | Vincent Fizer | New Orleans Saints | LB |
| 1989 | 4 | 12 | 96 | Maurice Hurst | New England Patriots | DB |
| 1990 | 8 | 20 | 213 | Harvey Wilson | Indianapolis Colts | DB |
| 1990 | 12 | 22 | 326 | Elliott Searcy | San Diego Chargers | WR |
| 1991 | 3 | 4 | 59 | Aeneas Williams | Phoenix Cardinals | DB |
| 1992 | 2 | 11 | 39 | Robert Harris | Minnesota Vikings | DE |
| 1992 | 3 | 25 | 81 | Thomas McLemore | Detroit Lions | TE |
| 1992 | 11 | 2 | 282 | Brian Thomas | Los Angeles Rams | WR |
| 1995 | 4 | 7 | 105 | Jerry Wilson | Tampa Bay Buccaneers | DB |
| 1996 | 7 | 8 | 217 | Donnell Baker | Carolina Panthers | WR |
| 1998 | 7 | 6 | 195 | Lawrence Hart | New York Jets | TE |
| 1999 | 7 | 40 | 246 | Chris White | Jacksonville Jaguars | DT |
| 2000 | 5 | 18 | 147 | Gillis Wilson | Carolina Panthers | DE |
| 2004 | 7 | 51 | 252 | Lenny Williams | Tampa Bay Buccaneers | DB |
| 2022 | 7 | 5 | 226 | Ja'Tyre Carter | Chicago Bears | OG |
