= Victor Gold (journalist) =

American journalist

- Born: September 25, 1928; East St. Louis, Illinois, U.S.
- Died: June 5, 2017 (aged 88); Alexandria, Virginia, U.S.
- Education: Alcée Fortier High School; Tulane University; University of Alabama School of Law
- Occupations: Journalist; Press Secretary to the late Vice President Spiro T. Agnew
- Political party: No Party (formerly a Democrat-turned-Republican)
- Spouse: Dale Gold
- Children: Son Stephen and daughters Paige and Jamie

Victor "Vic" Gold (September 25, 1928 – June 5, 2017) was an American journalist, author, and Republican political consultant. Gold began his career as a lawyer and advisor to the Democratic Party in Alabama before switching to the Republican Party. He worked as deputy press secretary for Senator Barry Goldwater during the 1964 presidential election and press secretary for Vice President Spiro T. Agnew from 1970 to 1973.

Gold left politics for a time to work as a writer and political commentator, returning in 1979 as a speechwriter to the presidential campaign of George H. W. Bush during the 1980 Republican presidential primary and was an advisor to Bush's 1988 and 1992 campaigns. Gold later split with the Republicans over the 2003 invasion of Iraq and left the party in 2016.

He was the author of several published works of non-fiction. He co-authored George H. W. Bush's 1987 autobiography and co-authored a 1988 novel with Lynne Cheney.

== Early life and education ==
Gold was born in East St. Louis, Illinois, on September 25, 1928, to Jewish immigrants, and grew up in New Orleans, Louisiana, where he attended public schools and graduated in 1945 from the former Alcée Fortier High School in Uptown New Orleans, since superseded by The Willow School.

At Fortier, Gold was a classmate of Dave Treen, the Louisiana Republican lawyer who became the first member of his party in a century to gain election to the United States House of Representatives, in his case Louisiana's 3rd congressional district in 1972, and as governor of Louisiana in 1979. Gold encouraged Republicans in both Alabama and Louisiana as they sought with slow success to overcome the long-term dominance of the Democrats in their states.

He graduated from Tulane University and then worked as a reporter-correspondent for The Birmingham News in Birmingham, Alabama. He then received a law degree from the University of Alabama School of Law in Tuscaloosa. He served in the United States Army during the Korean War.

== Career ==
=== Public relations ===
In 1958, Gold joined the Washington, D.C. public relations firm of Selvage & Lee.

Gold's interest in Republican politics began after the Bay of Pigs invasion, which made him disillusioned with the presidency of Democrat John F. Kennedy, for whom he had voted in 1960. He was attracted to Senator Goldwater's strong stance against communism and Goldwater's libertarianism and contrarian tendencies. In 1964 he became deputy press secretary for Goldwater's unsuccessful presidential campaign.

In his chronicle of the 1964 election, Theodore H. White described Gold as having played a critical role in helping to overcome the press corps' hostility toward Goldwater. A 2007 article in The Washington Post quoted White as saying that Gold "carried [the journalists'] bags, got them to the trains on time, out-shouted policemen on their behalf, bedded them down and woke them up, and before they knew it, the correspondents, about 95 percent anti-Goldwater by conviction, had been won to a friendship with the diminutive intellectual which spilled over onto his hero."

In 1965, Gold opened his own political public relations firm in Washington, D.C., serving Republican clients including Gerald Ford, Bob Dole, and Shirley Temple Black.

At the Republican National Conventions of 1968 and 1976 he worked with press secretary Lyn Nofziger in support of the presidential candidacy of Ronald W. Reagan, who was at the time governor of California. During the Nixon administration he served as press secretary to Vice President Agnew. Timothy Crouse wrote in The Boys on the Bus that while the reporters covering Agnew were occasionally amused by Gold's politics, much like the Goldwater reporters had they respected him as a "stickler for perfection. He made sure that everyone had a room, that everyone knew where the phones were, and that the Western Union man was never more than a few feet away". He worked with Agnew in the Congressional election campaign of 1970, when Agnew made appearances around the country criticizing incumbent Democratic Senators with epithets such as "nattering nabobs of negativism."

=== Presidential campaigns ===
In 1980, Gold joined the staff of Republican presidential candidate George H. W. Bush as a speechwriter and senior advisor. He served on Bush's vice presidential staff in 1981, was a speechwriter and advisor for the Reagan-Bush campaign in 1984, and was an advisor to Bush in his 1988 and 1992 presidential campaigns.

In 1989, he was appointed to a delegation sent by President Bush to provide oversight of the first free elections in Romania after the ouster of Nicolae Ceauşescu. Gold's father immigrated to the U.S. from Kishinev, Bessarabia, which in the early 20th century was considered part of Romania.

=== Corporation for Public Broadcasting ===
President George H. W. Bush appointed him to the board of the Corporation for Public Broadcasting during the early 1990s, where he criticized the CPB for its funding of Pacifica Radio and sought to terminate CPB funding of Pacifica, citing objections to program content that was considered anti-semitic.

In November 2014, Gold participated in a panel held at The Heritage Foundation on the legacy of Barry Goldwater's 1964 presidential campaign. Moderator Lee Edwards introduced him as follows: "Vic Gold is the wizard of wordsmiths, the prince of press secretaries, the man with the shortest temper in Washington routinely called Old Faithful because he blows up at least every 91 minutes, trusted adviser to vice presidents and presidents, a graduate of the University of Alabama Law School who loves to quote Bear Bryant and hoist high the Crimson Tide, indefatigable deputy press secretary for Barry Goldwater in 1964."

== Journalism and author ==
Gold was a contributor to Washingtonian magazine, where he was the magazine's national correspondent. He also wrote articles on politics and sports for numerous other U.S. publications, was a speaker for political audiences and on university campuses, and appeared on television shows.

A personal friend of the Bush family, he co-wrote George H. W. Bush's 1987 autobiography, Looking Forward, which was published the year before Bush's successful campaign for the U.S. presidency.

Together with Lynne Cheney, who was a colleague at Washingtonian magazine before she became chairman of the National Endowment for the Humanities, Gold co-authored a satirical political novel entitled The Body Politic, published in 1988. The novel revolves around a Republican vice president who dies while making love to a female television news reporter.

He also was the author of several nonfiction books. I Don't Need You When I'm Right recounted his experience in Washington, D.C. public relations. P-R As In President dealt with the influence of the news media and public relations in U.S. presidential political campaigns.

In his 2007 book Invasion of the Party Snatchers: How the Neo-Cons and Holy Rollers Destroyed the GOP, he criticized President George W. Bush and Vice President Dick Cheney. In the book, he called the younger Bush "the weakest, most out of touch president in modern times." Gold called Cheney "Machiavellian" and said that "a vice president in control is bad enough. Worse yet is a vice president out of control." Under their leadership, he said that the Republican Party had abandoned its long-time principles of small government, prudent foreign policy, and keeping government out of people's private lives. He decried the influence of religious right leaders such as Pat Robertson and Jerry Falwell, and said that the Republican Party had been transformed into "a party of pork-barrel ear-markers like Dennis Hastert, of political hatchet men like Karl Rove, and of Bible-thumping hypocrites like Tom DeLay." The criticisms were considered particularly noteworthy in view of Gold's close relationships with the people he criticized.

In July 2010, he began a blog, The Wayward Lemming, where in March 2016 he publicly announced his withdrawal from the Republican Party.

== Personal life ==
He and his wife, Dale, lived in Northern Virginia from 1959 to the time of his death in 2017. He had a son, Stephen, and two daughters, Paige and Jamie.

== Recognitions ==
In 1992, Gold received the Distinguished Achievement Award for Political Communication from the University of Alabama.

== Bibliography ==
- I Don't Need You When I'm Right: The Confessions of a Washington PR Man, by Victor Gold. Morrow, 1975. ISBN 0-688-02909-4, ISBN 978-0-688-02909-8
- P-R as in President: A Pro Looks At Press Agents, Media, & The 1976 Candidates, by Victor Gold. Doubleday, 1977. ISBN 0-385-12334-5, ISBN 978-0-385-12334-1
- Looking Forward: An Autobiography, by George Bush with Victor Gold. Doubleday, 1987.
- The Body Politic by Victor Gold and Lynne V. Cheney. Macmillan, 1988. ISBN 0-312-02171-2, ISBN 978-0-312-02171-9
- Liberwocky: What Liberals Say and What They Really Mean, by Victor Gold. Thomas Nelson, 2004. ISBN 0-7852-6057-9, ISBN 978-0-7852-6057-8
- Invasion of the Party Snatchers: How the Neo-Cons and Holy Rollers Destroyed the GOP, by Victor Gold. Sourcebooks Trade, 2007. ISBN 1-4022-0841-3, ISBN 978-1-4022-0841-6
