= Matthew Teague =

American football player (born 1958)

No. 72
- Position: Linebacker

Personal information
- Born: October 22, 1958 (age 68); Cincinnati, Ohio, U.S.
- Listed height: 6 ft 5 in (1.96 m)
- Listed weight: 240 lb (109 kg)

Career information
- High school: Alcée Fortier (New Orleans, Louisiana)
- College: Prairie View A&M
- NFL draft: 1980: 10th round, 273rd overall pick
- Supplemental draft: 1980: 7th round

Career history
- Dallas Cowboys (1980)*; Atlanta Falcons (1980–1981); Ottawa Rough Riders (1982); Toronto Argonauts (1983); Saskatchewan Roughriders (1984); Los Angeles Raiders (1985)*
- * Offseason or practice squad member only

Career NFL statistics
- Games played: 11
- Stats at Pro Football Reference

Matthew Nathaniel Teague (born October 22, 1958) is an American former professional football player who was a linebacker in the National Football League (NFL) for the Atlanta Falcons. He was selected by the Dallas Cowboys in the tenth round of the 1980 NFL draft and then later by the Falcons in the 1980 NFL supplemental draft for a seventh round pick. He was a member of the Ottawa Rough Riders, Toronto Argonauts and Saskatchewan Roughriders of the Canadian Football League (CFL). He played college football for the Prairie View A&M Panthers.

== Early life ==
Teague attended Alcee Fortier High School in New Orleans, Louisiana, where he played mostly in the offensive line. He also practiced baseball.

He accepted football scholarship from Prairie View A&M University, where he became a four-year starter at left defensive end. His teams won only 12 games in 4 seasons, including going 0-11 in 1979.

== Professional career ==
=== Dallas Cowboys ===
Teague was selected by the Dallas Cowboys in the tenth round (273rd overall) of the 1980 NFL draft to play linebacker, as he was seen as an above average athlete.

=== Atlanta Falcons ===
He was selected by the Atlanta Falcons in the seventh round of the 1980 NFL supplemental draft, after his original selection by the Cowboys became invalid because of a college eligibility issue. On September 2, 1980, he was placed on the disabled list with an injured left knee he suffered in training camp. In 1981, he played in 11 games. On August 31, 1982, he was waived by the Atlanta Falcons.

=== Canadian Football League ===
On September 10, 1982, he was signed as a free agent by the Ottawa Rough Riders. On December 6, 1984, he was signed by the Saskatchewan Roughriders.

=== Los Angeles Raiders ===
In 1985, he was signed by the Los Angeles Raiders. He was released on July 25.
