= List of Mississippi Valley State Delta Devils in the NFL draft =

This is a list of Mississippi Valley State Delta Devils football players in the NFL draft.

== Key ==
B	Back	K	Kicker	NT	Nose tackle
C	Center	LB	Linebacker	FB	Fullback
DB	Defensive back	P	Punter	HB	Halfback
DE	Defensive end	QB	Quarterback	WR	Wide receiver
DT	Defensive tackle	RB	Running back	G	Guard
E	End	T	Offensive tackle	TE	Tight end

= Pro Bowler
= Hall of Famer

== Selections ==
Year	Round	Pick	Overall	Player	Team	Position
1958	15	3	172	Stan Hinos	Philadelphia Eagles	T
1961	14	4	186	Deacon Jones	Los Angeles Rams	DE
1967	9	2	213	Fred Freeman	New York Giants	T
1968	2	18	45	Dave McDaniels	Dallas Cowboys	WR
1968	9	16	235	Sam Moore	Chicago Bears	T
1969	10	3	237	Jeff Stanciel	Atlanta Falcons	RB
1970	17	1	417	Harry Key	Pittsburgh Steelers	TE
1972	17	23	439	Ted Washington Sr.	Kansas City Chiefs	LB
1973	7	24	180	Nate Dorsey	Pittsburgh Steelers	DE
1975	13	25	337	Robert Gaddis	Pittsburgh Steelers	WR
1976	7	1	183	Parnell Dickinson	Tampa Bay Buccaneers	QB
1976	10	5	270	Ricky Feacher	New England Patriots	WR
1976	11	23	314	Melvin Morgan	Cincinnati Bengals	DB
1976	12	19	338	Herman Harris	San Diego Chargers	DB
1985	1	16	16	Jerry Rice	San Francisco 49ers	WR
1986	5	1	111	Carl Byrum	Buffalo Bills	RB
1986	9	23	244	Joe Thomas	Denver Broncos	WR
1988	2	16	43	Vincent Brown	New England Patriots	LB
1988	7	21	186	Danta Whitaker	New York Giants	TE
1992	2	1	29	Ashley Ambrose	Indianapolis Colts	DB
1992	8	16	212	Ronald Humphrey	Indianapolis Colts	RB
