= 1991 All-South Independent football team =

American college football season

The 1991 All-South Independent football Team consists of American football players chosen by the Associated Press for their All-South independent teams for the 1991 NCAA Division I-A football season.

== Offense ==
=== Quarterback ===
- Casey Weldon, Florida State (AP-1)
- Jeff Blake, East Carolina (AP-2)

=== Running backs ===
- Amp Lee, Florida State (AP-1)
- Jason Davis, Louisiana Tech (AP-1)
- Edgar Bennett, Florida State (AP-2)
- Ralph Dawkins, Louisville (AP-2)

=== Wide receivers ===
- Robert Brooks, South Carolina (AP-1)
- Hunter Gallimore, East Carolina (AP-1)
- Wilbert Ursin, Tulane (AP-2)
- Wayde Butler, Southwestern Louisiana (AP-2)

=== Tight ends ===
- Luke Fisher, East Carolina (AP-1)
- Marcus Pope, Southern Miss (AP-2)

=== Offensive tackles ===
- Willie Roaf, Louisiana Tech (AP-1)
- Tom Scott, East Carolina (AP-1)
- Kevin Mancini, Florida State (AP-1)
- Robert Stevenson, Florida State (AP-2)
- Glenn Hunt, Louisiana Tech (AP-2)
- Chris Ryals, Southern Miss (AP-2)

=== Offensive guards ===
- Mike Morris, Florida State (AP-1)
- James Maclin, Memphis (AP-2)
- Chafan March, Southern Miss (AP-2)

=== Centers ===
- Jay Killen, South Carolina (AP-1)
- Trey Wingerter, Louisiana-Lafayette (AP-2)

== Defense ==
=== Defensive tackles ===
- Artie Smith, Louisiana Tech (AP-1)
- Chris Hobbs, Memphis (AP-1)
- James Atkins, Southwestern Louisiana (AP-2)

=== Defensive ends ===
- Carl Simpson, Florida State (AP-1)
- Marty Dye, South Carolina (AP-1)
- Jerry Dillon, East Carolina (AP-2)
- Darren McGowan, Tulane (AP-2)

=== Inside linebackers ===
- Kirk Carruthers, Florida State (AP-1)
- Marvin Jones, Florida State (AP-1)
- Arnie Williams, Southern Miss (AP-2)

=== Linebackers ===
- Robert Jones, East Carolina (AP-1)
- Danton Barto, Memphis (AP-1)
- Howard Dinkins, Florida State (AP-2)
- Thad McDowell, Southern Miss (AP-2)
- Andy Cutley, Louisville (AP-2)
- Myron Baker, Louisiana Tech (AP-2)

=== Cornerbacks ===
- Terrell Buckley, Florida State (AP-1)
- Ray Buchanan, Louisville (AP-1)

=== Safeties ===
- Demise Lloyd, Louisiana Tech (AP-1)
- Chris Hall, East Carolina (AP-1)
- Greg Grandison, East Carolina (AP-2)
- Dominic Calloway, Memphis (AP-2)
- Derrick Hoskins, Southern Miss (AP-2)
- Mike Staid, Tulane (AP-2)

== Special teams ==
=== Kicker ===
- Anthony Brenner (AP-1)
- Klaus Willsmeyer, Louisville (AP-2)

=== Punter ===
- Jeff Buffaloe, Memphis (AP-1)
- John Jett, East Carolina (AP-2)
