= Alcée Fortier High School =

Former high school in New Orleans, Louisiana

Coordinates: 29°56′07″N 90°06′51″W

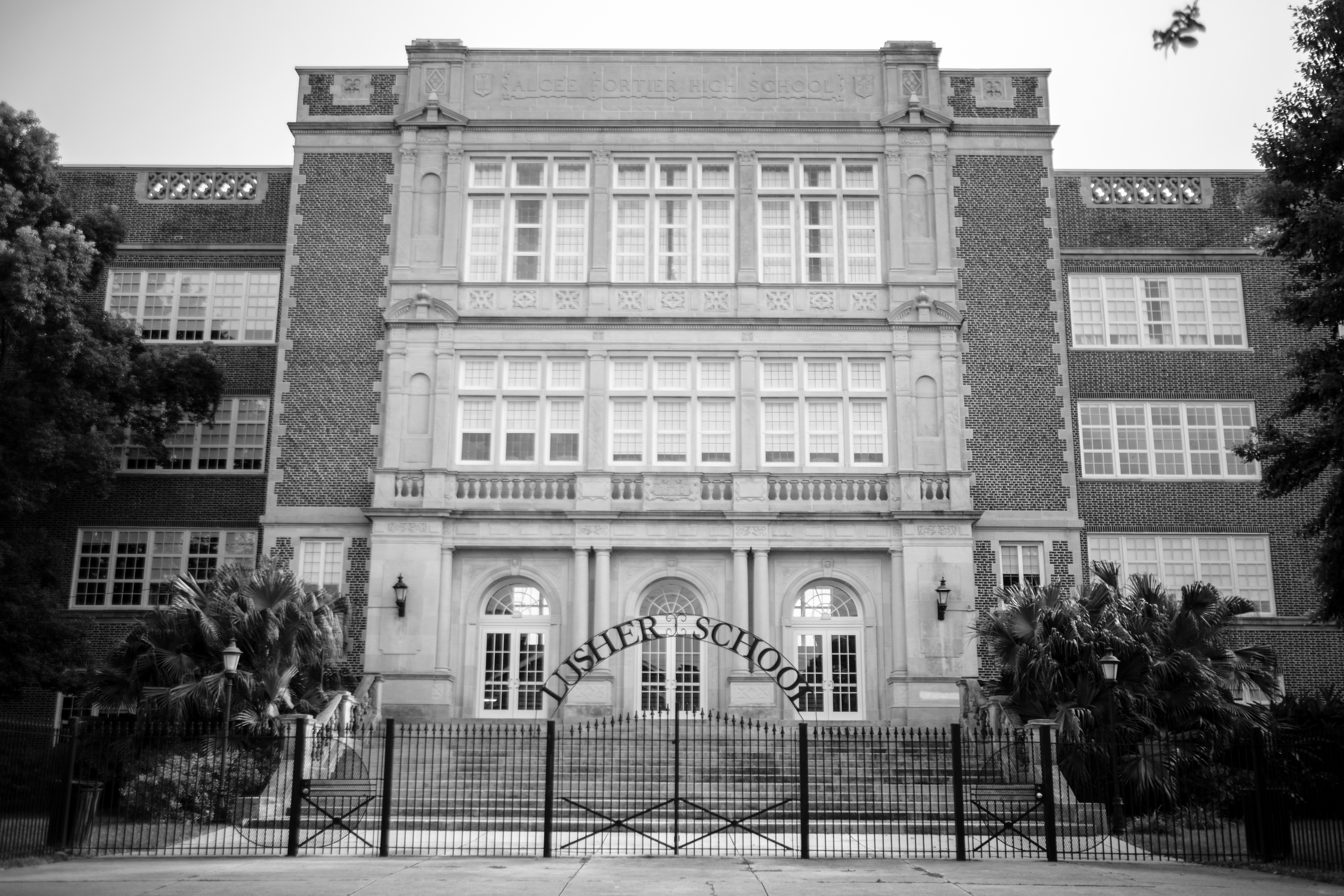
The former Alcée Fortier High School, later the secondary campus of The Willow School (formerly named Lusher Charter School).

Alcée Fortier High School was a high school in Uptown New Orleans, Louisiana that served grades 9–12. It was located five blocks away from McMain Secondary School.

== History ==
The school opened in 1931 and was named for the renowned professor of Romance Languages at Tulane, Alcée Fortier. Originally Fortier was an all-boys school.

In 1992, Michael Lach and Michael Loverude of The Christian Science Monitor stated "Based on test scores, dropout rates, and socioeconomic status of the students, the schools we taught in were two of the worst high schools in the country - Booker T. Washington and Alcee Fortier high schools. Given these circumstances, both schools do a fine job, but students leave deserving so much more."

Around 2003, the school made an "academically unacceptable" list. In 2006, John Schmid of the Milwaukee Journal Sentinel said that Fortier was considered to be one of the "worst" schools in Louisiana. The high school closed in 2006.

Lusher Charter School's secondary campus opened in the former Alcée Fortier building.

== Curriculum ==
The school offered German after its 1931 opening. About 150 students per academic period studied German. German was discontinued in the New Orleans school system in 1938, with the approach of World War II.

== Athletics ==
=== Championships ===
Football championships

- (1) State Championship: 1948

== Notable alumni ==
- Ashley Ambrose — NFL cornerback (1992-2004), played for several teams including the Atlanta Falcons and New Orleans Saints
- Victor Gold (Class of 1945) — journalist
- Frederick Jacob Reagan Heebe, judge
- Al Hirt — Musician
- Maurice Hurst — NFL cornerback (1989-1995)
- Kevin Lewis — NFL cornerback (1989-1992)
- Russell Long — U.S. senator from 1948 to 1987
- Jason Mitchell — American actor best known for portraying rapper Eazy-E in the 2015 biopic Straight Outta Compton.
- Howard K. Smith — television journalist
- Matthew Teague — NFL linebacker (1980-1985)
- John Kennedy Toole — novelist
- Dave Treen (Class of 1945) — governor of Louisiana from 1980 to 1984
- Norman Treigle — operatic bass-baritone
- Tony Washington — played American football at school during his junior year, moved to University School of Las Colinas because of Hurricane Katrina
- Aeneas Williams — NFL defensive back (1991-2004), member of the Pro Football Hall of Fame

== Notes ==
- Merrill, Ellen C. Germans Of Louisiana. Pelican Publishing, 2005. ISBN 1455604844, 9781455604845.
