= Wayde Butler =

American gridiron football player (born 1969)

No. 8
- Position: Wide receiver

Personal information
- Born: December 25, 1969 (age 56); Beaumont, Texas, U.S.
- Listed height: 6 ft 0 in (1.83 m)
- Listed weight: 180 lb (82 kg)

Career information
- College: Southwestern Louisiana (1989–1992)

Career history
- 1993: San Diego Chargers*
- 1993: Edmonton Eskimos
- 1994: San Diego Chargers*
- * Offseason or practice squad member only

Awards and highlights
- Grey Cup champion (1993); First-team All-IFA (1992); Second-team All-South independent (1991)

Wayde Douglas Butler Jr. (born December 25, 1969) is an American former professional football wide receiver who played one season with the Edmonton Eskimos of the Canadian Football League (CFL). He played college football at the University of Southwestern Louisiana. He was also a member of the San Diego Chargers of the National Football League (NFL).

== Early life and college ==
Wayde Douglas Butler Jr. was born on December 25, 1969, in Beaumont, Texas. He was a four-year letterman for the Southwestern Louisiana Ragin' Cajuns of the University of Southwestern Louisiana from 1989 to 1992, spending time at both wide receiver and running back. He caught 41 passes for 516 yards and one touchdown as a freshman in 1989 while also rushing 29 times for 111 yards and returning three kicks for 60 yards. In 1990, Butler totaled 43 receptions for 398 yards, 50 carries for 186 yards and two touchdowns, and 16 kick returns for 361 yards. His junior year in 1991, he recorded 38 catches for 491 yards and three touchdowns, three rushes for 13 yards, and 12 kick returns for 268 yards, earning Associated Press (AP) second-team All-South independent honors. As a senior in 1992, he accumulated 50 receptions for 671 yards and four touchdowns, eight carries for 20 yards, seven kick returns for 157 yards, and four punt returns for 27 yards, garnering AP first-team All-IFA accolades. Butler played in the East-West Shrine Game after his senior season. He also completed two of six passes for 76 yards, one touchdown, and one interception during his college career.

== Professional career ==
Butler was signed by the NFL's San Diego Chargers on May 4, 1993, after going undrafted in the 1993 NFL draft. He was released by the Chargers on August 30, 1993.

Butler signed with the Edmonton Eskimos of the CFL in October 1993. Butler played in three games for the Eskimos during the 1993 season, catching one pass for seven yards and posting one tackle. On November 28, 1993, the Eskimos beat the Winnipeg Blue Bombers in the 81st Grey Cup by a score of 33–23. He was released by the Eskimos on July 4, 1994, before the start of the 1994 season.

Butler spent the 1994 off-season with the San Diego Chargers. He was released by the Chargers on August 22, 1994.
