= Chris Hall (defensive back) =

American gridiron football player (born 1970)

No. 38, 32
- Position: Safety

Personal information
- Born: April 25, 1970 (age 56); Fort Dix, New Jersey, U.S.
- Listed height: 6 ft 2 in (1.88 m)
- Listed weight: 184 lb (83 kg)

Career information
- High school: Pemberton Township (Pemberton Township, New Jersey)
- College: East Carolina
- NFL draft: 1992: 9th round, 250th overall pick

Career history
- Dallas Cowboys (1993); Miami Dolphins (1994)*; Frankfurt Galaxy (1995–1998)
- * Offseason or practice squad member only

Awards and highlights
- Super Bowl champion (XXVIII); First-team All-South independent (1991)

Career NFL statistics
- Games played: 1
- Stats at Pro Football Reference

Charles Christopher Hall (born April 25, 1970) is an American former professional football player who was a safety in the National Football League (NFL) for the Dallas Cowboys. He was selected by the Cowboys in the ninth round of the 1992 NFL draft. He played college football for the East Carolina Pirates. Hall was also a member of the Frankfurt Galaxy of the World League of American Football (WLAF).

== Early life ==
Hall attended Pemberton Township High School, where he practiced football, basketball and track. As a senior, he was a second-team All-state running back and an All-conference selection at small forward.

== College career ==
Hall accepted a football scholarship from East Carolina University. Although he was recruited as a running back, he became a defensive starter in the middle of his first year and was recognized as one of the country's top freshman cornerbacks by the Sporting News, while registering 3 interceptions.

As a junior, he registered 85 tackles (second on the team), 2 interceptions and 8 passes defensed (led the team). He had a career-high 20 tackles against regional rival the University of South Carolina.

As a senior he had 3 interceptions, while helping his team to its best record (11-1) and highest ranking (9th by the A.P.) in school history. He posted a season-high 12 tackles against the University of Illinois, 11 tackles against the University of Pittsburgh and 10 against the University of South Carolina.

He finished his college career with 9 interceptions, 26 passes defensed (school record) and 4 fumble recoveries.

== Professional career ==
Hall was selected by the Dallas Cowboys in the ninth round (250th overall) of the 1992 NFL draft, with the intention of converting him into a safety. He was one of 7 defensive backs drafted that year by the Cowboys and was waived on August 24.

He was re-signed on April 20, 1993, before being waived on October 13.

Hall later played for the WLAF's Frankfurt Galaxy, leading or tying for the league lead in interceptions in three years: 8 in 1995, 4 in 1996 and 4 in 1997.
