= Ashley Ambrose =

American football player and coach (born 1970)

No. 33, 43
- Position: Cornerback

Personal information
- Born: September 17, 1970 (age 56); New Orleans, Louisiana, U.S.
- Listed height: 5 ft 10 in (1.78 m)
- Listed weight: 195 lb (88 kg)

Career information
- High school: Alcée Fortier (New Orleans, Louisiana)
- College: Mississippi Valley State
- NFL draft: 1992: 2nd round, 29th overall pick

Career history

Playing
- Indianapolis Colts (1992–1995); Cincinnati Bengals (1996–1998); New Orleans Saints (1999); Atlanta Falcons (2000–2002); New Orleans Saints (2003–2004); Kansas City Chiefs (2005)*
- * Offseason or practice squad member only

Coaching
- Colorado (2010) Defensive backs coach; California (2011–2012) Defensive backs coach; Idaho (2014) Cornerbacks coach; Texas State (2015) Cornerbacks coach; Boise State (2016–2017) Cornerbacks coach; Colorado (2018–2019) Cornerbacks coach

Awards and highlights
- First-team All-Pro (1996); Pro Bowl (1996)

Career NFL statistics
- Tackles: 515
- Interceptions: 42
- Passes defended: 86
- Forced fumbles: 5
- Stats at Pro Football Reference

Ashley Avery Ambrose (born September 17, 1970) is an American former professional football player who was a cornerback in the National Football League (NFL) during the 1990s and early 2000s. He played college football for the Mississippi Valley State Delta Devils.

Ambrose was hired as a defensive technical intern for the Colorado football team's 2008 season. In May 2009, head coach Dan Hawkins announced that Ambrose would take over as the wide receivers coach in 2010, but after the departure of Greg Brown, Ambrose took over the defensive backs. From 2011 to 2012, he was the secondary coach at University of California, Berkeley. In 2013, he spent the season with the New Orleans Saints in the NFL as a minority intern. In 2014, he coached cornerbacks at the University of Idaho and moved on to Texas State University in 2015 before being hired by Boise State University in January 2016. He was then the cornerbacks coach at the University of Colorado.

== Professional career ==
Pre-draft measurables
Height	Weight	Arm length	Hand span	40-yard dash	10-yard split	20-yard split	20-yard shuttle	Vertical jump	Broad jump	Bench press
5 ft 10 in (1.78 m)	177 lb (80 kg)	31 in (0.79 m)	9 1/8 in (0.23 m)	4.51 s	1.59 s	2.60 s	4.16 s	34.0 in (0.86 m)	10 ft 0 in (3.05 m)	7 reps

=== Indianapolis Colts ===
The Indianapolis Colts selected Ambrose in the second round (29th overall) of the 1992 NFL draft. He was the fifth cornerback drafted in 1992 and became Mississippi Valley State's second highest player selected in the NFL Draft, following 1985 first-round pick (16th overall) Jerry Rice. He became the 14th player drafted from Mississippi Valley State since 1970.

==== 1992 season ====
On August 13, 1992, the Indianapolis Colts signed Ambrose to a three—year, $2.30 million rookie contract that included an initial signing bonus of $950,000 following a 26-day holdout throughout training camp. Head coach Ted Marchibroda named Ambrose the No. 2 starting cornerback to begin the regular season, pairing him with Chris Goode after Eugene Daniel suffered a knee injury that would sideline him for the first three games.

On September 6, 1992, Ambrose made his professional regular season debut and earned his first career start in the Indianapolis Colts' home-opener against the Cleveland Browns and recorded three combined tackles (two solo) and had one pass break-up as they won 14–3. On September 14, 1992, the Colts officially placed Ambrose on injured reserve due to an ankle injury he suffered during a 10–20 loss to the Houston Oilers in Week 2. On October 29, 1992, the Colts activated Ambrose from injured reserve and added him to the active roster after he missed five games (Weeks 3–8) due to an ankle injury. He finished his rookie season with 12 combined tackles (11 solo) and four pass deflections in ten games and two starts.

==== 1993 season ====
Throughout training camp, Ambrose had competition to be the third cornerback on the depth chart after the Colts drafted Ray Buchanan and signed free agent Tony Stargell. Defensive coordinator Rick Venturi named Ambrose a backup cornerback as the fourth cornerback on the depth chart to begin the season, behind starting tandem Chris Goode and Eugene Daniel and primary backup Tony Stargell. In Week 10, he set a season-high with nine solo tackles during a 24–30 loss at the Washington Redskins. He finished the 1993 NFL season with 37 combined tackles (34 solo) and three pass deflections in 14 games and four starts.

==== 1994 season ====
On January 13, 1994, the Indianapolis Colts hired Vince Tobin to be their new defensive coordinator following the firing of Rick Venturi. Head coach Ted Marchibroda named Ambrose and Eugene Daniel the starting cornerbacks to begin the regular season following the departures of Chris Goode and Tony Stargell. On September 4, 1994, Ambrose started in the Indianapolis Colts' home-opener against the Houston Oilers and set a season-high with eight solo tackles and made three pass deflections as they won 45–21. On September 13, 1994, Ambrose made five combined tackles (three solo), three pass deflections, and had the first interception of his career after picking off a pass Neil O'Donnell threw to wide receiver Charles Johnson during a 21–31 loss at the Pittsburgh Steelers.

Following Week 3, defensive coordinator Vince Tobin opted to demote Ambrose and named Damon Watts as the starter at cornerback in his place. Entering Week 13, Ray Buchanan was moved from free safety to cornerback, taking over for Damon Watts for the last five games of the season. He finished the 1994 NFL season with 29 combined tackles (23 solo), 14 pass deflections, and two interceptions in 14 games and four starts.

==== 1995 season ====
Throughout training camp, Ambrose competed against Damon Watts to be the primary backup cornerback. Head coach Ted Marchibroda named Ambrose a backup and listed him as the third cornerback on the depth chart to begin the season, behind starters Eugene Daniel and Ray Buchanan. In Week 2, he set a season-high with three combined tackles (two solo) during a 27–24 overtime victory at the New York Jets. On December 23, 1995, Ambrose made two pass deflections and set a season-high with two interceptions on passes thrown by Drew Bledsoe as the Colts defeated the New England Patriots 7–10. He finished the season with 14 combined tackles (11 solo), ten pass deflections, and three interceptions in 16 games and zero starts.

The Indianapolis Colts finished the 1995 NFL season second in the AFC East with a 9–7 record to enter the playoffs. Defensive coordinator Vince Tobin chose to promote Ambrose to a starting role as a cornerback, replacing Eugene Daniel, throughout the playoffs. On December 31, 1995, Ambrose started in his first career playoff game and recorded five solo tackles and had a team-high three pass deflections during a 35–20 win at the San Diego Chargers to win the AFC Wild-Card Game. On January 7, 1996, Ambrose made one solo tackle, one pass deflection, and intercepted Steve Bono's pass attempt to Webster Slaughter during a 10–7 win at the Kansas City Chiefs in the Divisional Round. The following week, the Colts lost the AFC Championship Game 16–20 at the Pittsburgh Steelers.

=== Cincinnati Bengals ===
==== 1996 season ====
On February 27, 1996, the Cincinnati Bengals signed Ambrose to a three—year, $5.10 million contract that included an initial signing bonus of $1.70 million. Entering training camp, Ambrose was slated as a starting cornerback along with free agent acquisition Jimmy Spencer. Head coach Dave Shula named Ambrose and Jimmy Spencer as the starting cornerbacks to begin the season, replacing Rod Jones, Roger Jones, and Corey Sawyer.

On September 1, 1996, Ambrose started in the Cincinnati Bengals' season-opener at the St. Louis Rams and recorded two solo tackles, set a season-high with four pass deflections, and had his first interception as a member of the Bengals after picking off a pass attempt by Steve Walsh as they lost 16–26. In Week 2, he recorded four solo tackles, made three pass deflections, and set a season-high with two interceptions off pass attempts by Stan Humphries and Sean Salisbury during a 14–27 loss at the San Diego Chargers. On November 10, 1996, Ambrose set a season-high with seven solo tackles, made three pass deflections, and intercepted Mike Tomczak's pass attempt to wide receiver Andre Hastings as the Bengals defeated the Pittsburgh Steelers 24–34. The following week, he made four solo tackles, one pass deflection, and intercepted Jim Kelly's pass attempt to wide receiver Quinn Early to return it 31—yards to score the first touchdown of his career during a 17–31 loss at the Buffalo Bills in Week 12. On December 16, 1996, the Bengals officially made Bruce Coslet their head coach after he earned them a 6–2 record as the interim head coach after Dave Shula was fired. He started in all 16 games for the first time in his career and finished with 50 combined tackles (44 solo), 23 pass deflections, eight interceptions, a forced fumble, and one touchdown. He set a career-high with his eight interceptions and finished with the second most interceptions in the league in 1996, following safeties Keith Lyle and Tyrone Braxton. His performance throughout the season earned him a selection to the 1997 Pro Bowl, marking the first and only Pro Bowl selection of his career.

==== 1997 season ====
The Bengals' new defensive coordinator Dick LeBeau retained Ambrose as the No. 1 starting cornerback and paired him with Jimmy Spencer for the first nine games of the season. He was also paired with Tito Paul and Corey Sawyer during the season. In Week 5, he set a season-high with eight solo tackles and made two pass deflections during a 14–31 loss to the New York Jets. On November 9, 1997, Ambrose made five combined tackles (four solo), two pass deflections, one sack, and set a season-high with two interceptions on passes by Kelly Holcomb during a 28–13 win at the Indianapolis Colts. He made the first sack of his career on Kelly Holcomb for a 10—yard loss. He started all 16 games for the second consecutive season and finished with 59 combined tackles (57 solo), three pass deflections, two fumble recoveries, and one sack.

==== 1998 season ====
Ambrose returned as the No. 1 starting cornerback and was paired with 1998 second-round pick (43rd overall) Artrell Hawkins for the 1998 NFL season. On September 13, 1998, Ambrose made four solo tackles, two pass deflections, and sent a 28–28 tie into overtime by intercepting Scott Mitchell's pass attempt to running back Barry Sanders with 43 seconds remaining as the Bengals would go onto win in overtime 34–28 at the Detroit Lions. In Week 14, he set a season-high with seven solo tackles and made one pass deflection during a 20–33 loss against the Buffalo Bills. In Week 11, Ambrose recorded two solo tackles before exiting during the second quarter of a 3–24 loss at the Minnesota Vikings due to a knee injury. He subsequently remained inactive as the Bengals lost 13–20 to the Baltimore Ravens in Week 12 due to his knee injury. On December 27, 1998, Ambrose recorded one solo tackle, tied his season-high of three pass deflections, and intercepted a pass attempt by Trent Dilfer during a 35–0 loss to the Tampa Bay Buccaneers. He finished the season with 40 combined tackles (36 solo), 15 pass deflections, and two interceptions in 15 games and 15 starts.

=== New Orleans Saints ===
==== 1999 season ====
On July 14, 1999, the New Orleans Saints signed Ambrose to a two—year, $10 million contract that included a signing bonus of $2.50 million. He was reunited with assistant head coach Rick Venturi who previously held the defensive coordinator position during his first two seasons with the Indianapolis Colts. Entering training camp, Ambrose was slated to be a starting cornerback, supplanting Alex Molden. Head coach Mike Ditka named Ambrose and Tyronne Drakeford the starting cornerbacks to begin the season.

In Week 2, he recorded two solo tackles, made one pass deflection, and picked off a pass Steve Young threw to Jerry Rice, marking his first interception with the Saints during a 21–28 loss at the San Francisco 49ers. On October 3, 1999, Ambrose made five solo tackles, three pass deflections, and set a season-high with two interceptions off passes by Shane Matthews during a 10–14 loss at the Chicago Bears. In Week 6, he set a season-high with seven solo tackles, made two pass deflections, and intercepted Neil O'Donnell's pass attempt to wide receiver Kevin Dyson during a 24–21 loss to the Tennessee Titans. In Week 17, he recorded three combined tackles (two solo) and set a season-high with five pass deflections during a 13–45 loss at the Carolina Panthers. He started in all 16 games throughout the 1999 NFL season and finished with 57 combined tackles (51 solo), 22 pass deflections, six interceptions, and two fumble recoveries.

==== 2000 season ====
On February 11, 2000, Ambrose became an unrestricted free agent after the New Orleans Saints declined to exercise the second year option on his contract.

=== Atlanta Falcons ===
On February 17, 2000, the Atlanta Falcons signed Ambrose to a five—year, $22.50 million contract that included an initial signing bonus of $7.50 million. He entered training camp slated as the No. 2 starting cornerback after Ronnie Bradford was transitioned from cornerback to free safety. Head coach Dan Reeves named Ambrose and Ray Buchanan the starting cornerbacks to begin the regular season.

On September 3, 2000, Ambrose made two solo tackles, one pass deflection, a forced fumble, and had a pick-six after intercepting Jeff Garcia's pass to Jerry Rice and returning it for a 36—yard touchdown as the Falcons defeated the San Francisco 49ers 28–36. In Week 3, he made two solo tackles, one pass deflection, and led the Falcons to a 15–10 win against the Carolina Panthers after intercepting Steve Beuerlein's pass attempt to Muhsin Muhammad and returned it 37—yards as the game was tied 10–10 with 9:28 left in the fourth quarter. On October 8, 2000, Ambrose recorded one solo tackle, set a season-high with three pass deflections, and intercepted a pass attempt by Kerry Collins during a 13–6 loss to the New York Giants. He started in all 16 games throughout the 2000 NFL season and finished with 38 combined tackles (37 solo), 16 pass deflections, four interceptions, and a touchdown.

==== 2001 season ====
On January 19, 2001, Falcons' defensive coordinator Rich Brooks announced his resignation. On January 23, 2001, linebackers coach Don Blackmon was promoted to defensive coordinator. Head coach Dan Reeves retained Ambrose and Ray Buchanan as the starting cornerbacks to begin the season. In Week 5, he set a season-high with six solo tackles and had one fumble recovery as the Falcons lost in overtime 31–37 to the San Francisco 49ers. On November 18, 2001, Ambrose made three solo tackles, two pass deflections, and set a season-high with two interceptions on passes thrown by Brett Favre during a 23–20 victory at the Green Bay Packers. He started in all 16 games for the second consecutive season and finished with 52 combined tackles (49 solo), 10 pass deflections, five interceptions, and two fumble recoveries.

==== 2002 season ====
On February 11, 2002, the Atlanta Falcons hired Wade Phillips to be their new defensive coordinator after they fired Don Blackmon. Head coach Dan Reeves retained Ambrose and Ray Buchanan as the starting cornerbacks. On September 22, 2002, Ambrose recorded three solo tackles, set a season-high with three pass deflections, and intercepted Jon Kitna's pass attempt to T.J. Houshmandzadeh as the Falcons routed the Cincinnati Bengals 3—30. In Week 9, he set a season-high with six solo tackles during a 20–17 win against the Baltimore Ravens. He started in all 16 games for the third consecutive season and finished with 44 combined tackles (42 solo), 13 pass deflections, and three interceptions.

==== 2003 season ====
On February 21, 2003, the Atlanta Falcons released Ambrose with one year remaining on his contract due to salary cap concerns, saving the Falcons $3.12 million.

=== New Orleans Saints (second stint) ===
On March 3, 2003, the New Orleans Saints signed Ambrose to a four—year, $7.50 million contract that included a signing bonus of $1.50 million. He was reunited with defensive coordinator Rick Venturi for the third time during his career. Throughout training camp, Ambrose competed for a starting role at cornerback against Fred Thomas following the departures of Michael Hawthorne and Ken Irvin. Head coach Jim Haslett named Ambrose and Dale Carter the starting cornerbacks to begin the season. On November 2, 2003, Ambrose made one solo tackle, two pass deflections, two interceptions, and intercepted a pass by Brad Johnson and returned it for a 73—yard touchdown during a 17–14 victory at the Tampa Bay Buccaneers. In Week 17, he set a season-high with ten combined tackles (seven solo) and had two pass break-ups as the Saints defeated the Dallas Cowboys 13–7. He finished the 2003 NFL season with 48 combined tackles (42 solo), 16 pass deflections, three interceptions, a forced fumble, one fumble recovery, and one touchdown in 16 games and 12 starts.

==== 2004 season ====
Head coach Jim Haslett named Ambrose and Fred Thomas the starting cornerbacks to begin the regular season. On September 19, 2004, Ambrose recorded six combined tackles (four solo), set a season-high with three pass deflections, and secured a 27–30 victory against the San Francisco 49ers by intercepting a pass attempt by Ken Dorsey with 12 seconds remaining. The following week, he set a season-high with nine solo tackles, made two pass deflections, and forced a fumble during a 28–25 overtime victory at the St. Louis Rams in Week 3. He was inactive for three games (7, 9–10) after suffering a knee injury. On December 10, 2004, the New Orleans Saints officially placed Ambrose on injured reserve due to an ankle injury. He subsequently remained inactive for the last four games (Weeks 14–17) of the season. He finished the 2004 NFL season with 26 combined tackles (23 solo), nine pass deflections, three interceptions, a forced fumble, and a fumble recovery in nine games and six starts.

=== Kansas City Chiefs ===
On July 1, 2005, the Kansas City Chiefs signed Ambrose to a one—year contract.
