= Damon Watts =

American football player (born 1972)

No. 36
- Position: Cornerback

Personal information
- Born: April 8, 1972 (age 54); Indianapolis, Indiana, U.S.
- Listed height: 5 ft 10 in (1.78 m)
- Listed weight: 180 lb (82 kg)

Career information
- High school: Lawrence North (Indianapolis)
- College: Indiana
- NFL draft: 1994: undrafted

Career history
- Indianapolis Colts (1994–1997)
- Stats at Pro Football Reference

Damon Shanel Watts (born April 8, 1972) is an American former professional football player who was a cornerback for the Indianapolis Colts of the National Football League (NFL). He played college football for the Indiana Hoosiers.

Watts was a three-year starter at Indiana University Bloomington. He signed with the Indianapolis Colts as an undrafted free agent in 1994. Watts was immediately inserted into the starting lineup as a nickel back in the season opener and started seven additional games at left cornerback before he was benched in favor of Ray Buchanan, the team's free safety, in the fourth quarter of a game against the Miami Dolphins. Buchanan was only meant to relieve Watts temporarily, but he intercepted a pass from Dan Marino and returned it for a touchdown and took the starting role, going on to record seven interceptions in his final seven games. Watts came off the bench in his next 29 games, primarily on special teams or third down situations.

Watts regained his starting spot in 1997 after Buchanan signed with the Atlanta Falcons, opening the season at right cornerback against the Miami Dolphins. After playing his first three seasons at 175 lbs, he bulked up to 190 lbs. Watts suffered damage to two of his vertebrae in a game against the San Diego Chargers that October and was placed on injured reserve in November. After watching a life-threatening spinal cord injury to Detroit Lions player Reggie Brown on television, Watts decided to retire from the game, deciding that it was "not worth the risk."

Watts currently resides in Broward County Florida with his wife Dawn Watts and now works as the Middle School Dean of Students at North Broward Prep.
