= Bernard Carter (American football) =

American football player (born 1971)

No. 96, 50
- Position: Linebacker

Personal information
- Born: August 22, 1971 (age 55); Tallahassee, Florida, U.S.
- Listed height: 6 ft 3 in (1.91 m)
- Listed weight: 238 lb (108 kg)

Career information
- High school: Lincoln (Tallahassee)
- College: East Carolina
- NFL draft: 1994: 6th round, 165th overall pick

Career history
- Tampa Bay Buccaneers (1994)*; Green Bay Packers (1994); Jacksonville Jaguars (1995); Frankfurt Galaxy (1996); Denver Broncos (1997)*
- * Offseason or practice squad member only

Career NFL statistics
- Tackles: 4
- Stats at Pro Football Reference

Edward Bernard Carter (born August 22, 1971) is an American former professional football player who was a linebacker who played for the Jacksonville Jaguars of the National Football League (NFL). He was selected by the Tampa Bay Buccaneers in the sixth round of the 1994 NFL draft. He played college football at East Carolina University. First Team All-IFA(1992 & 1993)
