= Maurice Hurst (cornerback) =

American football player (born 1967)

No. 37
- Position: Cornerback

Personal information
- Born: September 17, 1967 (age 59); New Orleans, Louisiana, U.S.
- Listed height: 5 ft 10 in (1.78 m)
- Listed weight: 185 lb (84 kg)

Career information
- High school: New Orleans (LA) Alcee Fortier
- College: Southern
- NFL draft: 1989: 4th round, 96th overall pick

Career history
- New England Patriots (1989–1995)

Awards and highlights
- New England Patriots All-1990s Team

Career NFL statistics
- Tackles: 386
- Interceptions: 27
- Force fumbles: 4
- Stats at Pro Football Reference

Maurice Roy Hurst Sr. (born September 17, 1967) is an American former professional football player who was a cornerback for seven seasons for the New England Patriots in the National Football League (NFL). He was selected by the Patriots in the fourth round of the 1989 NFL draft. He played college football at Southern University, where he was a teammate of future hall of fame defensive back Aeneas Williams. His son, Maurice Hurst II, is a defensive tackle formerly of the Cleveland Browns.

== Professional career ==
Pre-draft measurables
Height	Weight	40-yard dash	10-yard split	20-yard split	20-yard shuttle	Vertical jump	Broad jump	Bench press
5 ft 9 3/4 in (1.77 m)	180 lb (82 kg)	4.58 s	1.57 s	2.73 s	4.41 s	29.0 in (0.74 m)	8 ft 11 in (2.72 m)	12 reps
All values from NFL Combine
