= Vince Tobin =

American football coach (1943–2023)

Personal information
- Born: September 29, 1943; Burlington Junction, Missouri, U.S.
- Died: July 3, 2023 (aged 79); Goodyear, Arizona, U.S.

Career information
- High school: Maryville (Maryville, Missouri)
- College: Missouri

Career history
- Missouri (1965) Graduate assistant; Missouri (1971–1976) Defensive coordinator; BC Lions (1977–1982) Defensive coordinator; Philadelphia/Baltimore Stars (1983–1985) Defensive coordinator; Chicago Bears (1986–1992) Defensive coordinator; Indianapolis Colts (1994–1995) Defensive coordinator; Arizona Cardinals (1996–2000) Head coach; Detroit Lions (2001) Defensive coordinator; Green Bay Packers (2004) Special assistant

Head coaching record
- Regular season: 28–43 (.394)
- Postseason: 1–1 (.500)
- Career: 29–44 (.397)
- Coaching profile at Pro Football Reference

Vincent Michael Tobin (September 29, 1943 – July 3, 2023) was an American professional football coach who was the head coach of the Arizona Cardinals of the National Football League (NFL). During his four decades of coaching, he primarily served as a defensive coordinator in the NFL, United States Football League (USFL), and Canadian Football League (CFL). He was also a defensive coordinator at his alma mater, the University of Missouri, where he had played college football as a defensive back for the Missouri Tigers.

== Early life ==
Vincent Tobin and his brother Bill were both born on a farm near Burlington Junction, Missouri. Their father, Ed, was basketball captain at the Conception Junction, Missouri high school. The brothers both attended Maryville High School, which is 16 miles from Burlington Junction, but the family thought their sports prospects would be much better at the bigger school, so they commuted each day to the school. The brothers, who are two years apart in age, both played football at Maryville and the University of Missouri.

== College coaching career ==
Tobin was a defensive back for the Missouri Tigers and entered the coaching ranks as a graduate assistant with the team in 1965. He was Missouri's defensive coordinator from 1971 to 1976.

== Pre-NFL coaching ==
Tobin was the defensive coordinator for the BC Lions of the CFL and for the Philadelphia / Baltimore Stars of the USFL. The Stars appeared in all three USFL championship games under Tobin and head coach Jim Mora, winning the last two in 1984 and 1985. He helped in the advancement of future Hall of Famer Sam Mills' professional football career.

== NFL coaching ==
=== Chicago Bears ===
After the USFL folded, Tobin, along with seven other Stars assistants and head coach Jim Mora, was hired by the New Orleans Saints on January 28, 1986. He resigned four days later on February 1 to become the defensive coordinator with the Super Bowl XX Champion Chicago Bears. He succeeded Buddy Ryan who became head coach of the Philadelphia Eagles one day after Tobin had joined the Saints. While the Bears' defensive unit ranked among the league's highest during his tenure, they never achieved the same dominance as they did in 1985, with the team's only playoff wins coming over Ryan's Eagles in 1988's Fog Bowl and in 1991 against New Orleans. Following the 1992 firing of head coach Mike Ditka, Tobin was released with the rest of the Bears coaching staff.

=== Indianapolis Colts ===
Tobin was hired in 1994 to be the defensive coordinator of the Indianapolis Colts by his brother Bill Tobin, the team's acting general manager. He left the team following the 1995 season.

=== Arizona Cardinals ===
In 1996, Tobin became head coach of the Cardinals, succeeding Buddy Ryan again. His one winning season and playoff berth as a head coach came in 1998 when the club posted a 9–7 record. He then coached the Cardinals to their first playoff win in 50 years during the 1998 season by defeating the 3rd-seeded Dallas Cowboys. The team lost the next week to the 1st-seeded Minnesota Vikings. After seven games of the 2000 season, Tobin was fired after posting a 2–5 record. His record in Arizona was 28–43, with a 1–1 postseason record.

=== Detroit Lions ===
In 2001 Tobin was hired as the defensive coordinator for the Detroit Lions, and the club posted a 2–14 record. He was fired after one season.

=== Head coaching record ===
Team	Year	Regular season					Postseason			
Team	Year	Won	Lost	Ties	Win %	Finish	Won	Lost	Win %	Result
ARI	1996	7	9	0	.438	4th in NFC East	—	—	—	—
ARI	1997	4	12	0	.250	5th in NFC East	—	—	—	—
ARI	1998	9	7	0	.563	2nd in NFC East	1	1	.500	Lost to Minnesota Vikings in NFC Divisional Game
ARI	1999	6	10	0	.375	4th in NFC East	—	—	—	—
ARI	2000	2	5	0	.286	Fired	—	—	—	—
Total		28	43	0	.394		1	1	.500	

== Personal life and death ==
Vince Tobin's brother Bill Tobin was the general manager of the Chicago Bears and the Indianapolis Colts. Vince served as Colts defensive coordinator while Bill was general manager.

Tobin died on July 3, 2023, at age 79.
