= 1998 All-Big East Conference football team =

American college football all-star team

The 1998 All-Big East Conference football team consists of American football players chosen as All-Big East Conference players for the 1998 NCAA Division I-A football season. The conference coaches and The Football News (FN) each selected teams.

The 1998 Syracuse Orange won the Big East championship and placed four players on the All-Big East first teams selected by the coaches of Football News: quarterback Donovan McNabb, wide receiver and return specialist Kevin Johnson, offensive tackle Scott Kiernan, and safety Phil Nash. It was McNabb's fourth year as a first-team All-Big East honoree and his third as the Big East offensive player of the year. Johnson was named the Big East special teams player of the year and also received first-team All-America honors from the American Football Coaches Association (AFCA). Five Syracuse players were named to the All-Big East second team.

The Miami Hurricanes finished in second place in the Big East and placed seven of its players on the first team by either the coaches of Football News: running back Edgerrin James tight end Bubba Franks, offensive tackle Richard Mercier, defensive end Derrick Ham, linebackers Dan Morgan and Nate Webster, and safety Ed Reed.

Virginia Tech finished in third place in the Big East, and seven of its players received first-team honors from either the coaches or Football News. Defensive end Corey Moore tallied 14 sacks, was selected as the Big East defensive player of the year, and received first-team All-America honors from the AFCA.

The West Virginia Mountaineers finished fourth and placed seven players on the first team as selected by the coaches or the Football News: running back Amos Zereoué, wide receiver Shawn Foreman, offensive tackles Bryan Pukenas and Solomon Page, center Eric de Groh, defensive lineman John Thornton, and linebacker Gary Stills. Zereoué ranked sixth nationally with 1,430 rushing yards.

Four Boston College players were named to the first team: senior running back Mike Cloud; offensive tackle Doug Brzezinski; junior nose guard Chris Hovan; and senior punter Jason Malecki. Cloud set Big East records in 1998 with 308 rushing attempts and 1,726 yards. Cloud was also a consensus first-team pick on the 1998 All-America college football team.

Rutgers snapped a 14-game losing streak and compiled a 5–6 record in 1998; its head coach Terry Shea was selected as the Big East coach of the year. Three Rutgers players also received first-team All-Big East honors from the Football News: linebacker Aaron Brady, cornerback Reggie Stephens, and tight end Chris Hutton.

The last place Pittsburgh Panthers placed two players on the first team: sophomore transfer wide receiver Latef Grim and junior cornerback Hank Poteat. Grim tallied 60 catches for 906 yards and nine touchdowns. Poteat led the Big East and tied for third nationally with six interceptions.

== Offensive selections ==
=== Quarterbacks ===
- Donovan McNabb, Syracuse (Coaches-1, FN)
- Marc Bulger, West Virginia (Coaches-2)

=== Running backs ===
- Mike Cloud, Boston College (Coaches-1, FN)
- Edgerrin James, Miami (FL) (Coaches-1)
- Amos Zereoué, West Virginia (FN)
- Rob Konrad, Syracuse (Coaches-2)
- Stacey Mack, Temple (Coaches-2)

=== Wide receivers ===
- Latef Grim, Pitt (Coaches-1, FN)
- Kevin Johnson, Syracuse (Coaches-1, FN)
- Shawn Foreman, West Virginia (Coaches-1)
- Santana Moss, Miami (FL) (Coaches-2)
- David Saunders, West Virginia (Coaches-2)

=== Tight ends ===
- Bubba Franks, Miami (FL) (Coaches-1)
- Chris Hutton, Rutgers (FN)
- Anthony Becht, West Virginia (Coaches-2)

=== Offensive tackles ===
- Richard Mercier, Miami (FL) (Coaches-1, FN)
- Bryan Pukenas, West Virginia (Coaches-2, FN)
- Derek Smith, Virginia Tech (Coaches-2, FN)
- Solomon Page, West Virginia (Coaches-1)
- Scott Kiernan, Syracuse (FN)
- Doug Brzezinski, Boston College (FN)

=== Offensive guard ===
- Doug Brzezinski, Boston College (Coaches-1)
- Scott Kiernan, Syracuse (Coaches-1)
- Dwight Vick, Virginia Tech (Coaches-2)
- Shaun O'Hara, Rutgers (Coaches-2)

=== Centers ===
- Eric de Groh, West Virginia (Coaches-1)
- Damien Woody, Boston College (Coaches-2)

== Defensive selections ==
=== Defensive line ===
- Derrick Ham, Miami (FL) (Coaches-1, FN)
- Chris Hovan, Boston College (Coaches-1, FN)
- Corey Moore, Virginia Tech (Coaches-1, FN)
- John Thornton, West Virginia (Coaches-1)
- John Engelberger, Virginia Tech (Coaches-2, FN)
- Wayne Hampton, Rutgers (Coaches-2)
- Nat Williams, Virginia Tech (Coaches-2)

=== Linebackers ===
- Nate Webster, Miami (FL) (Coaches-1, FN)
- Dan Morgan, Miami (FL) (Coaches-1)
- Gary Stills, West Virginia (Coaches-1)
- Jamel Smith, Virginia Tech (Coaches-2, FN)
- Aaron Brady, Rutgers (FN)
- Keith Bulluck, Syracuse (Coaches-2)
- Phil Clarke, Pitt (Coaches-2)
- Barrett Green, West Virginia (Coaches-2)

=== Cornerbacks ===
- Hank Poteat, Pitt (Coaches-1, FN)
- Loren Johnson, Virginia Tech (Coaches-1)
- Reggie Stephens (FN)
- Charles Fisher, West Virginia (Coaches-2)
- Leonard Myers, Miami (FL) (Coaches-2)

=== Safeties ===
- Pierson Prioleau, Virginia Tech (Coaches-1, FN)
- Phil Nash, Syracuse (Coaches-1)
- Ed Reed, Miami (FN)
- Keion Carpenter, Virginia Tech (Coaches-2)
- Jason Poles, Syracuse (Coaches-2)

== Special teams ==
=== Kickers ===
- Shayne Graham, Virginia Tech (Coaches-1)
- Nate Trout, Syracuse (Coaches-2, FN)

=== Punters ===
- Jimmy Kibble, Virginia Tech (Coaches-1, FN)
- Jason Malecki, Boston College (Coaches-1)
- Doug Dunkin, Syracuse (Coaches-2)

=== Return specialist ===
- Kevin Johnson, Syracuse (Coaches-1)
- Elmarko Jackson, Temple (Coaches-2)
- Tosh Riddick, Rutgers (Coaches-2)

== Key ==
Coaches, selected by the conference coaches

Football News (FN)

== See also ==
- 1998 All-America college football team
