= 1999 NFL draft =

National Football League Draft

General information
- Date: April 17–18, 1999
- Location: Theatre at MSG in New York City, New York
- Network: ESPN

Overview
- 253 total selections in 7 rounds
- League: NFL
- First selection: Tim Couch, QB; Cleveland Browns
- Mr. Irrelevant: Jim Finn, FB; Chicago Bears
- Most selections (13): Chicago Bears
- Fewest selections (1): New Orleans Saints
- Hall of Famers: 2: RB Edgerrin James; CB Champ Bailey

The 1999 NFL draft was the procedure by which National Football League teams selected amateur college football players. It is officially known as the NFL Annual Player Selection Meeting. The draft was held April 17–18, 1999, at the Theater at Madison Square Garden in New York City, New York. The league also held a supplemental draft after the regular draft and before the regular season.

Five quarterbacks were selected in the first round—Tim Couch, Donovan McNabb, Akili Smith, Daunte Culpepper, and Cade McNown—the second highest amount (along with the 2018 and 2021 drafts) after the six selected in 1983 and 2024. The draft also marked the second time after 1971 that the first three selections were quarterbacks. Only McNabb and Culpepper would have successful careers, while Couch, Smith and McNown are generally regarded as draft busts. McNabb, the most successful of the five, was also the only to appear in a Super Bowl.

The draft also is known for the Ricky Williams trade, which saw the New Orleans Saints trade all six of their draft picks to the Washington Redskins to select running back Ricky Williams fifth overall. New Orleans finished with a 3–13 record following the trade and Williams struggled as a rookie, resulting in the firing of Saints head coach Mike Ditka and general manager Bill Kuharich.

The following is the breakdown of the 253 players selected by position:

- 32 linebackers
- 30 wide receivers
- 24 safeties
- 23 cornerbacks
- 23 defensive ends
- 20 guards
- 19 defensive tackles
- 19 offensive tackles
- 16 running backs
- 13 quarterbacks
- 12 tight ends
- 10 fullbacks
- 4 punters
- 4 centers
- 3 kickers
- 1 long snapper

== Player selections ==
*	Compensatory selection
^	Supplemental compensatory selection
¤	Extra selection awarded to expansion team
†	Pro Bowler (Note: Players are identified as a Pro Bowler if they were selected for the Pro Bowl at any time in their career.)
‡	Hall of Famer

Positions key
Offense	Defense	Special teams
QB — Quarterback; RB — Running back; FB — Fullback; WR — Wide receiver; TE — Tight end; OL — Offensive lineman; T — Tackle; G — Guard; C — Center	DL — Defensive lineman; DT — Defensive tackle (Note: Includes nose tackle (NT)); DE — Defensive end; EDGE — Edge rusher; LB — Linebacker (Note: Includes middle linebacker (MLB/MIKE), weakside linebacker (WILL), strongside linebacker (SAM), off-ball linebacker, and outside linebacker (OLB)); DB — Defensive back; CB — Cornerback; S — Safety (Note: Includes free safety (FS) and strong safety (SS))	K — Kicker (Note: Also known as a placekicker (PK)); P — Punter; LS — Long snapper; RS — Return specialist (Note: Includes kickoff and punt returners)

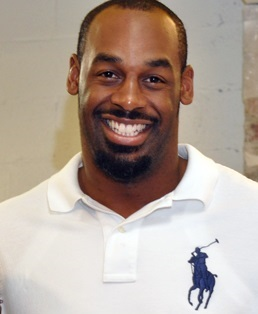
Donovan McNabb

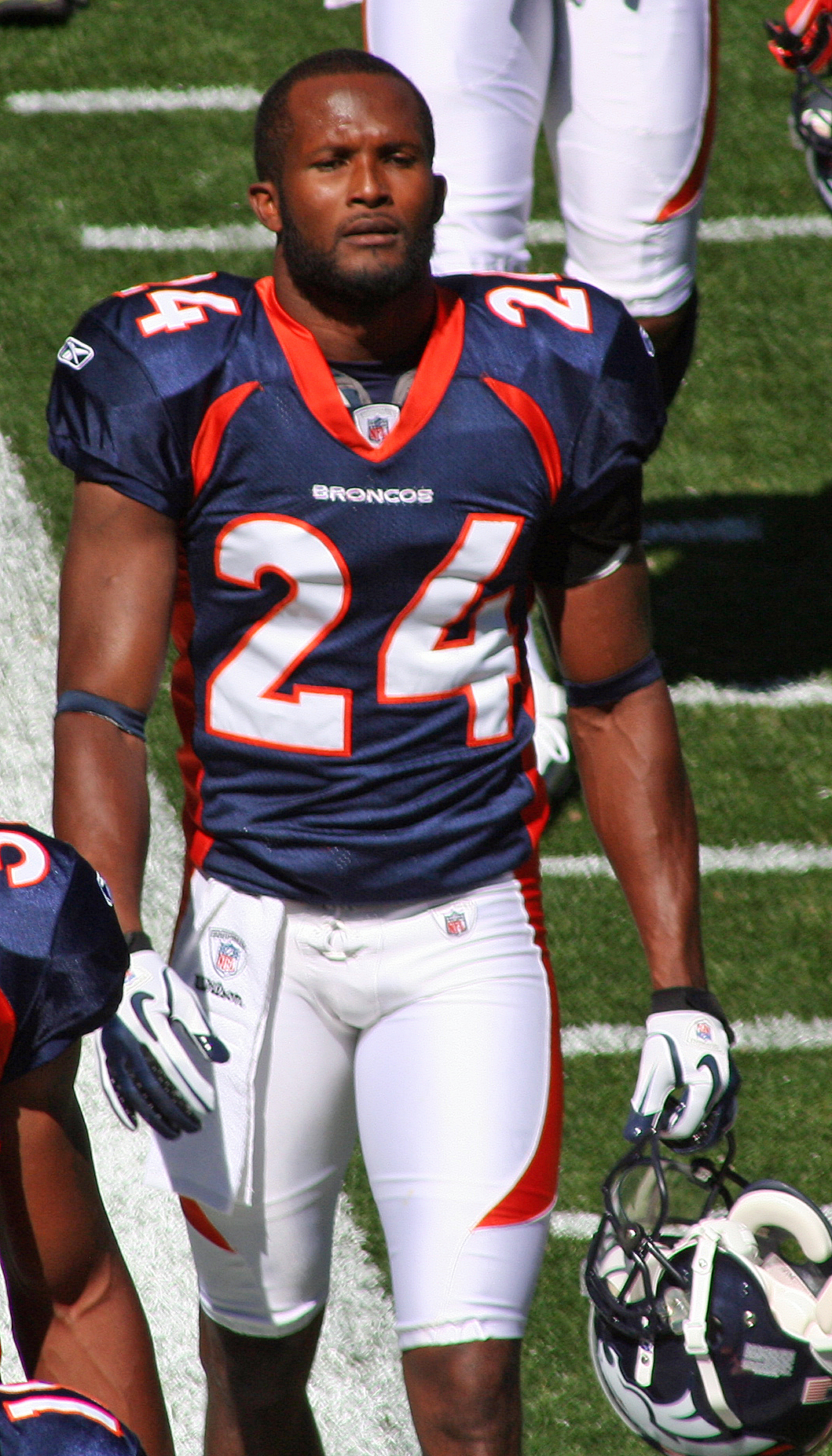
Champ Bailey

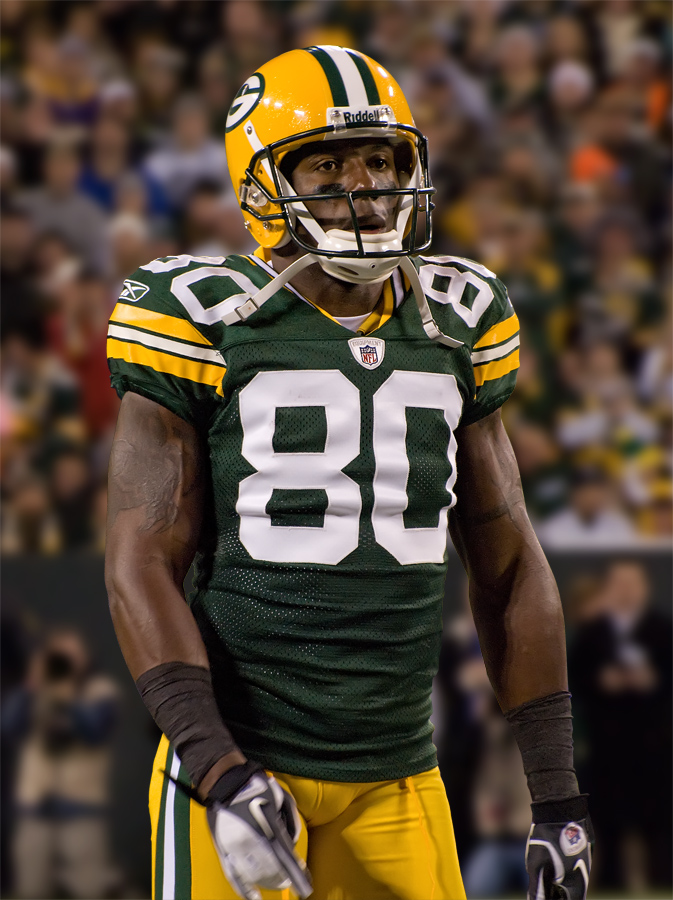
Donald Driver

Rnd.	Pick	Team	Player	Pos.	College	Notes
1	1	Cleveland Browns	Tim Couch	QB	Kentucky	
1	2	Philadelphia Eagles	Donovan McNabb ^{†}	QB	Syracuse	
1	3	Cincinnati Bengals	Akili Smith	QB	Oregon	
1	4	Indianapolis Colts	Edgerrin James^{‡}^{†}	RB	Miami (FL)	
1	5	New Orleans Saints	Ricky Williams ^{†}	RB	Texas	from Carolina via Washington (Note: No. 5: Carolina → Washington → New Orleans. Multiple trades: Carolina → Washington (PD). Carolina traded a first-round selection (5th overall) and a 2000 first-round selection to Washington as compensation for signing non-exclusive franchise-tagged free agent DT Sean Gilbert. Washington → New Orleans (D). Washington a first-round selection (5th overall) to New Orleans in exchange for first-, third-, fourth-, fifth-, sixth- and seventh-round selections (12th, 71st, 107th, 144th, 179th and 218th overall), and 2000 first- and third-round selections.)
1	6	St. Louis Rams	Torry Holt ^{†}	WR	North Carolina State	
1	7	Washington Redskins	Champ Bailey^{‡}^{†}	CB	Georgia	from Chicago (Note: No. 7: Chicago → Washington (D). Chicago traded a first-round selection (7th overall) to Washington in exchange for first-, third-, fourth- and fifth-round selections (12th, 71st, 106th and 143rd), and a 2000 third-round selection.)
1	8	Arizona Cardinals	David Boston ^{†}	WR	Ohio State	from San Diego (Note: No. 8: San Diego → Arizona (PD). San Diego traded a first-round selection (8th), 1998 first- and second-round selections, RB Eric Metcalf and LB Patrick Sapp to Arizona in exchange for a 1998 first-round selection.)
1	9	Detroit Lions	Chris Claiborne	LB	USC	
1	10	Baltimore Ravens	Chris McAlister ^{†}	CB	Arizona	
1	11	Minnesota Vikings	Daunte Culpepper ^{†}	QB	UCF	from Washington (Note: No. 11: Washington → Minnesota (PD). Washington traded first- and third-round selections (11th and 73rd overall), and a 2000 second-round selection to Minnesota in exchange for QB Brad Johnson.)
1	12	Chicago Bears	Cade McNown	QB	UCLA	from New Orleans via Washington (Note: No. 12: New Orleans → Washington → Chicago. Multiple trades: New Orleans → Washington (D). See Round 1: Washington → New Orleans. Washington → Chicago (D). See Round 1: Chicago → Washington.)
1	13	Pittsburgh Steelers	Troy Edwards	WR	Louisiana Tech	
1	14	Kansas City Chiefs	John Tait	T	BYU	
1	15	Tampa Bay Buccaneers	Booger McFarland	DT	LSU	
1	16	Tennessee Titans	Jevon Kearse ^{†}	DE	Florida	
1	17	New England Patriots	Damien Woody ^{†}	C	Boston College	from Seattle (Note: No. 17: Seattle → New England (D). Seattle traded a first-round selection (17th overall) to New England in exchange for first-, third- and sixth-round selections (20th, 82nd and 191st overall).)
1	18	Oakland Raiders	Matt Stinchcomb	T	Georgia	
1	19	New York Giants	Luke Petitgout	T	Notre Dame	
1	20	Dallas Cowboys	Ebenezer Ekuban	DE	North Carolina	from New England via Seattle (Note: No. 20: New England → Seattle → Dallas. Multiple trades: New England → Seattle (D). See Round 1: Seattle → New England. Seattle → Dallas (D). Seattle traded a first-round selection (20th overall) to Dallas in exchange for first- and fifth-round selections (22nd and 140th overall).)
1	21	Arizona Cardinals	L. J. Shelton	T	Eastern Michigan	
1	22	Seattle Seahawks	Lamar King	DE	Saginaw Valley State	from Dallas (Note: No. 22: Dallas → Seattle (D). See Round 1: Seattle → Dallas.)
1	23	Buffalo Bills	Antoine Winfield ^{†}	CB	Ohio State	
1	24	San Francisco 49ers	Reggie McGrew	DT	Florida	from Miami (Note: No. 24: Miami → San Francisco (D). Miami traded a first-round selection (24th overall) to San Francisco in exchange for first- and fifth-round selections (27th and 134th overall).)
1	25	Green Bay Packers	Antuan Edwards	S	Clemson	
1	26	Jacksonville Jaguars	Fernando Bryant	CB	Alabama	
1	27	Detroit Lions	Aaron Gibson	T	Wisconsin	from San Francisco via Miami (Note: No. 27: San Francisco → Miami → Detroit. Multiple trades: San Francisco → Miami (D). See Round 1: Miami → San Francisco. Miami → Detroit (D). Miami traded a first-round selection (27th overall) to Detroit in exchange for second-, third- and fifth-round selections (39th, 70th and 142nd overall).)
1	28	New England Patriots	Andy Katzenmoyer	LB	Ohio State	from NY Jets (Note: No. 28: NY Jets → New England (PD). The NY Jets traded a first-round selection (28th overall), 1997 third- and fourth-round selections, and a 1998 second-round selection to New England as compensation for hiring Bill Parcells as head coach.)
1	29	Minnesota Vikings	Dimitrius Underwood	DE	Michigan State	
1	30	Atlanta Falcons	Patrick Kerney ^{†}	DE	Virginia	
1	31	Denver Broncos	Al Wilson ^{†}	LB	Tennessee	
2	32	Cleveland Browns	Kevin Johnson	WR	Syracuse	
2	33	Cincinnati Bengals	Charles Fisher	CB	West Virginia	
2	34	Carolina Panthers	Chris Terry	T	Georgia	from Indianapolis (Note: No. 34: Indianapolis → Carolina (PD). Indianapolis traded a second-round selection (34th overall) to Carolina in exchange for CB Tyrone Poole.)
2	35	Philadelphia Eagles	Barry Gardner	LB	Northwestern	
2	36	Indianapolis Colts	Mike Peterson	LB	Florida	from St. Louis (Note: No. 36: St. Louis → Indianapolis (PD). St. Louis traded second- and fifth-round selections (36th and 138th overall) to Indianapolis in exchange for RB Marshall Faulk.)
2	37	Washington Redskins	Jon Jansen	T	Michigan	from Chicago (Note: No. 37: Chicago → Washington (D). Chicago traded a second-round selection (37th overall) to Washington in exchange for second- and fifth-round selections (40th and 144th overall).)
2	38	Carolina Panthers	Mike Rucker ^{†}	DE	Nebraska	
2	39	Miami Dolphins	J. J. Johnson	RB	Mississippi State	from Detroit (Note: No. 39: Detroit → Miami (D). See Round 1: Miami → Detroit.)
2	–	San Diego Chargers	Selection forfeited during the 1998 supplemental draft. (Note: San Diego forfeited a second-round selection after selecting DT Jamal Williams in the second round of the 1998 supplemental draft.)			
2	40	Oakland Raiders	Tony Bryant	DE	Florida State	from Washington via Chicago (Note: No. 40: Washington → Chicago → Oakland. Multiple trades: Washington → Chicago (D). See Round 2: Chicago → Washington. Chicago → Oakland (D). Chicago traded second- and fourth-round selections (40th and 102nd overall) to Oakland in exchange for second-, third- and fourth-round selections (48th, 78th and 111th overall).)
2	41	St. Louis Rams	Dré Bly ^{†}	CB	North Carolina	from New Orleans (Note: No. 41: New Orleans → St. Louis (PD). New Orleans traded a second-round selection (41st overall) to St. Louis in exchange for WR Eddie Kennison.)
2	42	Atlanta Falcons	Reggie Kelly	TE	Mississippi State	from Baltimore (Note: No. 42: Baltimore → Atlanta (D). Baltimore traded a second-round selection (42nd overall) to Atlanta in exchange for a 2000 first-round selection.)
2	43	Miami Dolphins	Rob Konrad	FB	Syracuse	from Kansas City (Note: No. 43: Kansas City → Miami (D). Kansas City traded a second-round selection (43rd overall) to Miami in exchange for second- and third-round selections (54th and 84th overall), and a 2000 sixth-round selection.)
2	44	Minnesota Vikings	Jim Kleinsasser	TE	North Dakota	from Pittsburgh (Note: No. 44: Pittsburgh → Minnesota (D). Pittsburgh traded a second-round selection (44th overall) to Minnesota in exchange for second-, third- and fifth-round selections (59th, 73rd and 163rd overall).)
2¤	45	Cleveland Browns	Rahim Abdullah	LB	Clemson	
2	46	New England Patriots	Kevin Faulk	RB	LSU	from Tennessee (Note: No. 46: Tennessee → New England (D). Tennessee traded a second-round selection (46th overall) to New England in exchange for second- and fourth-round selections (52nd and 117th overall).)
2	47	Green Bay Packers	Fred Vinson	CB	Vanderbilt	from Seattle (Note: No. 47: Seattle → Green Bay (PD). Seattle traded a second-round selection (47th overall) to Green Bay as compensation for signing Mike Holmgren as head coach.)
2	48	Chicago Bears	Russell Davis	DT	North Carolina	from Oakland (Note: No. 48: Oakland → Chicago (D). See Round 2: Chicago → Oakland.)
2	49	New York Giants	Joe Montgomery	RB	Ohio State	
2	50	Tampa Bay Buccaneers	Shaun King	QB	Tulane	
2	51	Arizona Cardinals	Johnny Rutledge	LB	Florida	
2	52	Tennessee Titans	John Thornton	DT	West Virginia	from New England (Note: No. 52: New England → Tennessee (D). See Round 2: Tennessee → New England.)
2	53	Buffalo Bills	Peerless Price	WR	Tennessee	
2	54	Kansas City Chiefs	Mike Cloud	RB	Boston College	from Miami (Note: No. 54: Miami → Kansas City (D). See Round 2: Kansas City → Miami.)
2	55	Dallas Cowboys	Solomon Page	G	West Virginia	
2	56	Jacksonville Jaguars	Larry Smith	DT	Florida State	
2	–	Green Bay Packers	Selection forfeited during the 1998 supplemental draft. (Note: Green Bay forfeited a second-round selection after selecting G Mike Wahle in the second round of the 1998 supplemental draft.)			
2	57	New York Jets	Randy Thomas	G	Mississippi State	
2	58	Denver Broncos	Montae Reagor	DT	Texas Tech	from San Francisco (Note: No. 58: San Francisco → Denver (PD). San Francisco traded a second-round selection (58th overall) to Denver in exchange for OT Jamie Brown.)
2	59	Pittsburgh Steelers	Scott Shields	S	Weber State	from Minnesota (Note: No. 59: Minnesota → Pittsburgh (D). See Round 2: Pittsburgh → Minnesota.)
2	60	San Diego Chargers	Jermaine Fazande	RB	Oklahoma	from Atlanta (Note: No. 60: Atlanta → San Diego (PD). Atlanta traded a second-round selection (60th overall) to San Diego in exchange for WR Tony Martin.)
2	61	Denver Broncos	Lennie Friedman	G	Duke	
3	62	Cleveland Browns	Daylon McCutcheon	CB	USC	
3	63	Indianapolis Colts	Brandon Burlsworth	G	Arkansas	
3	64	Philadelphia Eagles	Doug Brzezinski	G	Boston College	
3	65	Cincinnati Bengals	Cory Hall	S	Fresno State	
3	66	Chicago Bears	Rex Tucker	T	Texas A&M	
3	67	Denver Broncos	Chris Watson	CB	Eastern Illinois	from Carolina (Note: No. 67: Carolina → Denver (PD). Carolina traded a third-round selection (67th overall) and a 2000 fourth-round selection to Denver in exchange for QB Jeff Lewis.)
3	68	St. Louis Rams	Rich Coady	S	Texas A&M	
3	69	San Diego Chargers	Steve Heiden	TE	South Dakota State	
3	70	Detroit Lions	Jared DeVries	DE	Iowa	from Detroit via Miami (Note: No. 70: Detroit → Miami → Detroit. Multiple trades: Detroit → Miami (D). See Round 1: Miami → Detroit. Miami → Detroit (D). Miami traded a third-round selection (70th overall) to Detroit in exchange for third- and seventh-round selections (72nd and 232nd overall).)
3	71	Chicago Bears	D'Wayne Bates	WR	Northwestern	from New Orleans via Washington (Note: No. 71: New Orleans → Washington → Chicago. Multiple trades: New Orleans → Washington (D). See Round 1: Washington → New Orleans. Washington → Chicago (D). See Round 1: Chicago → Washington.)
3	72	Miami Dolphins	Grey Ruegamer	C	Arizona State	from Baltimore via Tampa Bay, Baltimore and Detroit (Note: No. 72: Baltimore → Tampa Bay → Baltimore → Detroit → Miami. Multiple trades: Baltimore → Tampa Bay (PD). Baltimore traded a third-round selection (72nd overall) to Tampa Bay in exchange for RB Errict Rhett. Tampa Bay → Baltimore (PD). Tampa Bay traded a third-round selection (72nd overall) to Baltimore in exchange for a 1998 fourth-round selection. Baltimore → Detroit (PD). Baltimore traded a third-round selection (72nd overall) and a 2000 fifth-round selection to Detroit in exchange for QB Scott Mitchell. Detroit → Miami (D). See Round 3: Miami → Detroit.)
3	73	Pittsburgh Steelers	Joey Porter ^{†}	LB	Colorado State	from Washington via Minnesota (Note: No. 73: Washington → Minnesota → Pittsburgh. Multiple trades: Washington → Minnesota (PD). See Round 1: Washington → Minnesota. Minnesota → Pittsburgh (D). See Round 2: Pittsburgh → Minnesota.)
3	74	Pittsburgh Steelers	Kris Farris	T	UCLA	
3	75	Kansas City Chiefs	Gary Stills ^{†}	DE	West Virginia	
3¤	76	Cleveland Browns	Marquis Smith	S	California	
3	77	Seattle Seahawks	Brock Huard	QB	Washington	
3	78	Chicago Bears	Marty Booker ^{†}	WR	Northeast Louisiana	from Oakland (Note: No. 78: Oakland → Chicago (D). See Round 2: Chicago → Oakland.)
3	79	New York Giants	Dan Campbell	TE	Texas A&M	
3	80	Tampa Bay Buccaneers	Martín Gramática ^{†}	K	Kansas State	
3	81	Tennessee Titans	Zach Piller	G	Florida	
3	82	Seattle Seahawks	Karsten Bailey	WR	Auburn	from New England (Note: No. 82: New England → Seattle (D). See Round 1: Seattle → New England.)
3	83	Arizona Cardinals	Tom Burke	DE	Wisconsin	
3	84	Kansas City Chiefs	Larry Atkins	LB	UCLA	from Miami (Note: No. 84: Miami → Kansas City (D). See Round 2: Kansas City → Miami.)
3	85	Dallas Cowboys	Dat Nguyen	LB	Texas A&M	
3	86	Buffalo Bills	Shawn Bryson	FB	Tennessee	
3	87	Green Bay Packers	Mike McKenzie	CB	Memphis	
3	88	Jacksonville Jaguars	Anthony Cesario	G	Colorado State	
3	89	San Francisco 49ers	Chike Okeafor	DE	Purdue	
3	90	New York Jets	David Loverne	G	San Jose State	
3	91	New England Patriots	Tony George	S	Florida	from Minnesota (Note: No. 91: Minnesota → New England (PD). Minnesota traded a third-round selection (91st overall) to New England in exchange for CB Jimmy Hitchcock.)
3	92	Atlanta Falcons	Jeff Paulk	FB	Arizona State	
3	93	Denver Broncos	Travis McGriff	WR	Florida	
3*	94	Green Bay Packers	Cletidus Hunt	DT	Kentucky State	
3*	95	Pittsburgh Steelers	Amos Zereoué	RB	West Virginia	
4	96	Indianapolis Colts	Paul Miranda	CB	UCF	from Cleveland via San Francisco (Note: No. 96: Cleveland → San Francisco → Indianapolis. Multiple trades: Cleveland → San Francisco (PD). Cleveland traded fourth- and fifth-round selections (96th and 134th overall) to San Francisco in exchange for a fourth-round selection (124th overall) and QB Ty Detmer. San Francisco → Indianapolis (D). San Francisco traded a fourth-round selection (96th overall) to Indianapolis in exchange for fourth- and sixth-round selections (99th and 171st).)
4	97	Philadelphia Eagles	John Welbourn	T	California	
4	98	Cincinnati Bengals	Craig Yeast	WR	Kentucky	
4	99	San Francisco 49ers	Anthony Parker	CB	Weber State	from Indianapolis (Note: No. 99: Indianapolis → San Francisco (D). See Round 4: San Francisco → Indianapolis.)
4	100	Carolina Panthers	Hannibal Navies	LB	Colorado	
4	101	St. Louis Rams	Joe Germaine	QB	Ohio State	
4	102	Oakland Raiders	Dameane Douglas	WR	California	from Chicago (Note: No. 102: Chicago → Oakland (D). See Round 2: Chicago → Oakland.)
4	103	Detroit Lions	Sedrick Irvin	RB	Michigan State	
4	104	San Diego Chargers	Jason Perry	S	North Carolina State	
4	105	Baltimore Ravens	Brandon Stokley	WR	Southwestern Louisiana	
4	106	Chicago Bears	Warrick Holdman	LB	Texas A&M	from Washington (Note: No. 106: Washington → Chicago (D). See Round 1: Chicago → Washington.)
4	107	Washington Redskins	Nate Stimson	LB	Georgia Tech	from New Orleans (Note: No. 107: New Orleans → Washington (D). See Round 1: Washington → New Orleans.)
4	108	Kansas City Chiefs	Larry Parker	WR	USC	
4	109	Pittsburgh Steelers	Aaron Smith ^{†}	DE	Northern Colorado	
4¤	110	San Francisco 49ers	Pierson Prioleau	S	Virginia Tech	from Cleveland (Note: No. 110: Cleveland → San Francisco (D). Cleveland traded a fourth-round selection (110th overall) to San Francisco in exchange for FB Marc Edwards.)
4	111	Chicago Bears	Rosevelt Colvin	LB	Purdue	from Oakland (Note: No. 111: Oakland → Chicago (D). See Round 2: Chicago → Oakland.)
4	112	New York Giants	Sean Bennett	RB	Northwestern	
4	113	Tampa Bay Buccaneers	Dexter Jackson	S	Florida State	Super Bowl XXXVII MVP
4	114	Tennessee Titans	Brad Ware	S	Auburn	
4	115	Seattle Seahawks	Antonio Cochran	DE	Georgia	
4	116	Arizona Cardinals	Joel Makovicka	FB	Nebraska	
4	117	Tennessee Titans	Donald Mitchell	CB	Southern Methodist	from New England (Note: No. 117: New England → Tennessee (D). See Round 2: Tennessee → New England.)
4	118	Dallas Cowboys	Wane McGarity	WR	Texas	
4	119	Buffalo Bills	Keith Newman	LB	North Carolina	
4	120	Minnesota Vikings	Kenny Wright	CB	Northwestern State	from Miami (Note: No. 120: Miami → Minnesota (PD). Miami traded a fourth-round selection (120th overall) to Minnesota as compensation for signing restricted free agent TE Hunter Goodwin.)
4	121	Jacksonville Jaguars	Kevin Landolt	T	West Virginia	
4	122	Buffalo Bills	Bobby Collins	TE	North Alabama	from Green Bay (Note: No. 122: Green Bay → Buffalo (PD). Green Bay traded a fourth-round selection (122nd overall) to Buffalo in exchange for RB Darick Holmes.)
4	123	New York Jets	Jason Wiltz	DT	Nebraska	
4	124	Cleveland Browns	Wali Rainer	LB	Virginia	from San Francisco (Note: No. 124: San Francisco → Cleveland (PD). See Round 4: Cleveland → San Francisco.)
4	125	Minnesota Vikings	Jay Humphrey	T	Texas	
4	126	Atlanta Falcons	Johndale Carty	S	Utah State	
4	127	Denver Broncos	Olandis Gary	RB	Georgia	
4*	128	Philadelphia Eagles	Damon Moore	S	Ohio State	
4*	129	Baltimore Ravens	Edwin Mulitalo	G	Arizona	
4*	130	Philadelphia Eagles	Na Brown	WR	North Carolina	
4*	131	Green Bay Packers	Aaron Brooks	QB	Virginia	
4*	132	Dallas Cowboys	Peppi Zellner	DE	Fort Valley State	
4*	133	Green Bay Packers	Josh Bidwell ^{†}	P	Oregon	
5	134	Miami Dolphins	Cecil Collins	RB	McNeese State	from Cleveland via San Francisco (Note: No. 134: Cleveland → San Francisco → Miami. Multiple trades: Cleveland → San Francisco (PD). See Round 4: Cleveland → San Francisco. San Francisco → Miami (D). See Round 1: Miami → San Francisco.)
5	135	Cincinnati Bengals	Nick Luchey	FB	Miami (FL)	
5	136	Pittsburgh Steelers	Jerame Tuman	TE	Michigan	from Indianapolis (Note: No. 136: Indianapolis → Pittsburgh (PD). Indianapolis traded a fifth-round selection (136th overall) to Pittsburgh in exchange for LB Steve Conley.)
5	137	Detroit Lions	Tyree Talton	S	Northern Iowa	from Philadelphia (Note: No. 137: Philadelphia → Detroit (D). Philadelphia traded a fifth-round selection (137th overall) to Detroit in exchange for a 2000 fourth-round selection.)
5	138	Indianapolis Colts	Brad Scioli	DE	Penn State	from St. Louis (Note: No. 138: St. Louis → Indianapolis (PD). See Round 2: St. Louis → Indianapolis.)
5	139	San Diego Chargers	Adrian Dingle	DE	Clemson	from Chicago (Note: No. 139: Chicago → San Diego (PD). Chicago traded a fifth-round selection (139th overall) to San Diego in exchange for DT Shawn Lee.)
5	140	Seattle Seahawks	Floyd Wedderburn	G	Penn State	from Carolina via Dallas (Note: No. 140: Carolina → Dallas → Seattle. Multiple trades: Carolina → Dallas (PD). Carolina traded a fifth-round selection (140th overall) to Dallas as compensation for signing restricted free agent WR Patrick Jeffers. Dallas → Seattle (D). See Round 1: Seattle → Dallas.)
5	141	San Diego Chargers	Reggie Nelson	G	McNeese State	
5	142	Miami Dolphins	Bryan Jones	LB	Oregon State	from Detroit (Note: No. 142: Detroit → Miami (D). See Round 1: Miami → Detroit.)
5	143	Chicago Bears	Jerry Wisne	T	Notre Dame	from Washington (Note: No. 143: Washington → Chicago (D). See Round 1: Chicago → Washington.)
5	144	Chicago Bears	Khari Samuel	LB	Massachusetts	from New Orleans via Washington (Note: No. 144: New Orleans → Washington → Chicago. Multiple trades: New Orleans → Washington (D). See Round 1: Washington → New Orleans. Washington → Chicago (D). See Round 2: Chicago → Washington.)
5	145	St. Louis Rams	Cameron Spikes	G	Texas A&M	from Baltimore (Note: No. 145: Baltimore → St. Louis (D). Baltimore traded a fifth-round selection (145th overall) and a 2000 seventh-round selection to St. Louis in exchange for QB Tony Banks.)
5	146	Oakland Raiders	Eric Barton	LB	Maryland	from Pittsburgh (Note: No. 146: Pittsburgh → Oakland (D). Pittsburgh traded two fifth-round selections (146th and 163rd overall) to Oakland in exchange for a 2000 third-round selection.)
5	147	Chicago Bears	Jerry Azumah ^{†}	CB	New Hampshire	from Kansas City (Note: No. 147: Kansas City → Chicago (PD). Kansas City traded a fifth-round selection (147th overall) to Chicago in exchange for RB Bam Morris.)
5¤	148	Cleveland Browns	Darrin Chiaverini	WR	Colorado	
5	149	New York Giants	Mike Rosenthal	T	Notre Dame	
5	150	Tampa Bay Buccaneers	John McLaughlin	DE	California	
5	151	Tennessee Titans	Kevin Daft	QB	UC Davis	
5	152	Seattle Seahawks	Charlie Rogers	RB	Georgia Tech	
5	153	Oakland Raiders	Roderick Coleman ^{†}	DT	East Carolina	
5	154	New England Patriots	Derrick Fletcher	G	Baylor	
5	155	Arizona Cardinals	Paris Johnson	S	Miami (OH)	
5	156	Buffalo Bills	Jay Foreman	LB	Nebraska	
5	157	San Francisco 49ers	Terry Jackson	FB	Florida	from Miami (Note: No. 157: Miami → San Francisco (PD). Miami traded a fifth-round selection (157th overall) to San Francisco in exchange for G Kevin Gogan.)
5	158	Denver Broncos	David Bowens	DE	Western Illinois	from Dallas (Note: No. 158: Dallas → Denver (PD). Dallas traded a fifth-round selection (158th overall) to Denver in exchange for TE Kendell Watkins.)
5	159	Green Bay Packers	De'mond Parker	RB	Oklahoma	
5	160	Jacksonville Jaguars	Jason Craft	CB	Colorado State	
5	161	San Francisco 49ers	Tyrone Hopson	G	Eastern Kentucky	
5	162	New York Jets	Jermaine Jones	CB	Northwestern State	
5	163	Green Bay Packers	Craig Heimburger	G	Missouri	from Minnesota via Pittsburgh and Oakland (Note: No. 163: Minnesota → Pittsburgh → Oakland → Green Bay. Multiple trades: Minnesota → Pittsburgh (D). See Round 2: Pittsburgh → Minnesota. Pittsburgh → Oakland (D). See Round 5: Pittsburgh → Oakland. Oakland → Green Bay (D). Oakland traded a fifth-round selection (163rd overall) to Green Bay in exchange for a sixth-round selection (188th) and past considerations.)
5	164	Atlanta Falcons	Eugene Baker	WR	Kent State	
5	165	Washington Redskins	Derek Smith	T	Virginia Tech	from Denver (Note: No. 165: Denver → Washington (D). Denver traded a fifth-round selection (165th overall) to Washington in exchange for sixth- and seventh-round selections (179th and 218th overall).)
5*	166	Pittsburgh Steelers	Malcolm Johnson	WR	Notre Dame	
5*	167	Denver Broncos	Darwin Brown	CB	Texas Tech	
5*	168	Arizona Cardinals	Yusuf Scott	G	Arizona	
5*	169	Minnesota Vikings	Chris Jones	S	Clemson	
6	170	Seattle Seahawks	Steve Johnson	CB	Tennessee	from Cleveland (Note: No. 170: Cleveland → Seattle (D). Cleveland traded a sixth-round selection (170th overall) to Seattle in exchange for two sixth-round selections (187th and 191st overall).)
6	171	San Francisco 49ers	Tai Streets	WR	Michigan	from Indianapolis (Note: No. 171: Indianapolis → San Francisco (D). See Round 4: San Francisco → Indianapolis.)
6	172	Philadelphia Eagles	Cecil Martin	FB	Wisconsin	
6	173	Cincinnati Bengals	Kelly Gregg	DT	Oklahoma	
6	174	Cleveland Browns	Marcus Spriggs	DT	Troy	from Chicago (Note: No. 174: Chicago → Cleveland (D). Chicago traded a sixth-round selection (174th overall) to Cleveland in exchange for sixth- and seventh-round selections (184th and 207th overall).)
6	175	Carolina Panthers	Robert Daniel	DE	Northwestern State	
6	176	St. Louis Rams	Lionel Barnes	DE	Northeast Louisiana	
6	177	Detroit Lions	Clint Kriewaldt	LB	Wisconsin–Stevens Point	
6	178	San Diego Chargers	Tyrone Bell	CB	North Alabama	
6	179	Denver Broncos	Desmond Clark	TE	Wake Forest	from New Orleans via Washington (Note: No. 179: New Orleans → Washington → Denver. Multiple trades: New Orleans → Washington (D). See Round 1: Washington → New Orleans. Washington → Denver (D). See Round 5: Denver → Washington.)
6	180	New England Patriots	Marcus Washington	S	Colorado	from Baltimore (Note: No. 180: Baltimore → New England (PD). Baltimore traded a sixth-round selection (180th overall) to New England in exchange for TE Lovett Purnell.)
6	181	Washington Redskins	Jeff Hall	K	Tennessee	
6	182	Jacksonville Jaguars	Emarlos Leroy	DT	Georgia	from Kansas City via Tampa Bay (Note: No. 182: Kansas City → Tampa Bay → Jacksonville. Multiple trades: Kansas City → Tampa Bay (PD). Kansas City traded a sixth-round selection (182nd overall) to Tampa Bay in exchange for S Melvin Johnson. Tampa Bay → Jacksonville (D). Tampa Bay traded a sixth-round selection (182nd overall) to Jacksonville in exchange for sixth- and seventh-round selections (195th and 233rd overall).)
6	183	New York Jets	Marc Megna	LB	Richmond	from Pittsburgh (Note: No. 183: Pittsburgh → NY Jets (PD). Pittsburgh traded a sixth-round selection (183rd overall) to the NY Jets in exchange for WR Alex Van Dyke.)
6¤	184	Chicago Bears	Rashard Cook	S	USC	from Cleveland (Note: No. 184: Cleveland → Chicago (D). See Round 6: Chicago → Cleveland.)
6	185	Minnesota Vikings	Talance Sawyer	DT	Nevada-Las Vegas	from Tampa Bay via Baltimore (Note: No. 185: Tampa Bay → Baltimore → Minnesota. Multiple trades: Tampa Bay → Baltimore (D). Tampa Bay traded a sixth-round selection (185th overall) to Baltimore in exchange for QB Eric Zeier. Baltimore → Minnesota (D). Baltimore traded a sixth-round selection (185th overall) and a 2000 fourth-round selection to Minnesota in exchange for a 2000 sixth-round selection and G Everett Lindsay.)
6	186	Tennessee Titans	Darran Hall	WR	Colorado State	
6	187	Cleveland Browns	Kendall Ogle	LB	Maryland	from Seattle (Note: No. 187: Seattle → Cleveland (D). See Round 6: Cleveland → Seattle.)
6	188	Oakland Raiders	Daren Yancey	DT	BYU	from Oakland via Green Bay (Note: No. 188: Oakland → Green Bay → Oakland. Multiple trades: Oakland → Green Bay (PD). Oakland traded a sixth-round selection (188th) and a 1998 sixth-round selection to Green Bay in exchange for Green Bay's fifth-round selection in 1998. Green Bay → Oakland (D). See Round 5: Oakland → Green Bay.)
6	189	New York Giants	Lyle West	S	San Jose State	
6	190	Arizona Cardinals	Coby Rhinehart	CB	Southern Methodist	
6	191	Cleveland Browns	James Dearth	LS	Tarleton State	from New England via Seattle (Note: No. 191: New England → Seattle → Cleveland. Multiple trades: New England → Seattle (D). See Round 1: Seattle → New England. Seattle → Cleveland (D). See Round 6: Cleveland → Seattle.)
6	192	Miami Dolphins	Brent Bartholomew	P	Ohio State	
6	193	Dallas Cowboys	MarTay Jenkins	WR	Nebraska–Omaha	
6	194	Buffalo Bills	Armon Hatcher	S	Oregon State	
6	195	Tampa Bay Buccaneers	Lamarr Glenn	FB	Florida State	from Jacksonville (Note: No. 195: Jacksonville → Tampa Bay (D). See Round 6: Tampa Bay → Jacksonville.)
6	196	Green Bay Packers	Dee Miller	WR	Ohio State	
6	197	New York Jets	J. P. Machado	C	Illinois	
6	198	Atlanta Falcons	Jeff Kelly	LB	Kansas State	from San Francisco (Note: No. 198: San Francisco → Atlanta (PD). San Francisco traded a sixth-round selection (198th overall) to Atlanta in exchange for a 1998 seventh-round selection.)
6	199	Minnesota Vikings	Antico Dalton	LB	Hampton	
6	200	Atlanta Falcons	Eric Thigpen	S	Iowa	
6	201	Philadelphia Eagles	Troy Smith	WR	East Carolina	from Denver (Note: No. 201: Denver → Philadelphia (PD). Denver traded a sixth-round selection (201st overall) to Philadelphia in exchange for a 1998 seventh-round selection.)
6*	202	Arizona Cardinals	Melvin Bradley	LB	Arkansas	
6*	203	Green Bay Packers	Scott Curry	T	Montana	
6*	204	Denver Broncos	Chad Plummer	WR	Cincinnati	
6*	205	New York Giants	Andre Weathers	CB	Michigan	
6*	206	Arizona Cardinals	Dennis McKinley	FB	Mississippi State	
7	207	Cleveland Browns	Madre Hill	RB	Arkansas	from Cleveland via Chicago (Note: No. 207: Cleveland → Chicago → Cleveland. Multiple trades: Cleveland → Chicago (D). See Round 6: Chicago → Cleveland. Chicago → Cleveland (D). Chicago traded a seventh-round selection (207th overall) to Cleveland in exchange for two seventh-round selections (221st and 253rd overall).)
7	208	Philadelphia Eagles	Jed Weaver	TE	Oregon	
7	209	Cincinnati Bengals	Tony Coats	G	Washington	
7	210	Indianapolis Colts	Hunter Smith	P	Notre Dame	
7	211	Carolina Panthers	Tony Booth	S	James Madison	
7	212	Green Bay Packers	Chris Akins	S	Arkansas-Pine Bluff	from St. Louis (Note: No. 212: St. Louis → Green Bay (PD). St. Louis traded a seventh-round selection (212th overall) to Green Bay in exchange for QB Steve Bono.)
7	213	Green Bay Packers	Donald Driver ^{†}	WR	Alcorn State	from Chicago (Note: No. 213: Chicago → Green Bay (PD). Chicago traded a seventh-round selection (213th overall) to Green Bay in exchange for RB Glyn Milburn.)
7	214	Pittsburgh Steelers	Antonio Dingle	DT	Virginia	from San Diego (Note: No. 213: San Diego → Pittsburgh (PD). San Diego traded a seventh-round selection (214th overall) to Pittsburgh in exchange for RB Erric Pegram.)
7	215	Detroit Lions	Mike Pringley	DE	North Carolina	
7	216	Baltimore Ravens	Anthony Poindexter	S	Virginia	
7	217	Washington Redskins	Tim Alexander	WR	Oregon State	
7	218	Denver Broncos	Billy Miller	TE	USC	from New Orleans via Washington (Note: No. 218: New Orleans → Washington → Denver. Multiple trades: New Orleans → Washington (D). See Round 1: Washington → New Orleans. Washington → Denver (D). See Round 5: Denver → Washington.)
7	219	Pittsburgh Steelers	Chad Kelsay	LB	Nebraska	
7	220	Kansas City Chiefs	Eric King	G	Richmond	
7¤	221	Chicago Bears	Sulecio Sanford	WR	Middle Tennessee	from Cleveland (Note: No. 221: Cleveland → Chicago (D). See Round 7: Chicago → Cleveland.)
7	222	Tennessee Titans	Phil Glover	LB	Utah	
7	223	New York Jets	Ryan Young	T	Kansas State	from Seattle (Note: No. 223: Seattle → NY Jets (PD). Seattle traded a seventh-round selection (223rd overall) to the NY Jets in exchange for QB Glenn Foley.)
7	224	Oakland Raiders	JoJuan Armour	S	Miami (OH)	
7	225	New York Giants	Ryan Hale	DT	Arkansas	
7	226	Tampa Bay Buccaneers	Robert Hunt	G	Virginia	
7	227	New England Patriots	Michael Bishop	QB	Kansas State	
7	228	Pittsburgh Steelers	Kris Brown	K	Nebraska	from Arizona (Note: No. 228: Arizona → Pittsburgh (PD). Arizona traded a seventh-round selection (228th overall) to Pittsburgh in exchange for CB J. B. Brown.)
7	229	Dallas Cowboys	Mike Lucky	TE	Arizona	
7	230	Buffalo Bills	Sheldon Jackson	TE	Nebraska	
7	231	New York Giants	O. J. Childress	LB	Clemson	from Miami (Note: No. 231: Miami → NY Giants (PD). Miami traded a seventh-round selection (231st overall) to the NY Giants in exchange for RB Tyrone Wheatley.)
7	232	Miami Dolphins	Jermaine Haley	DT	Butte	from Green Bay via Detroit (Note: No. 232: Green Bay → Detroit → Miami. Multiple trades: Green Bay → Detroit (PD). Green Bay traded a seventh-round selection (232nd overall) to Detroit in exchange for RB Glyn Milburn. Detroit → Miami (D). See Round 3: Miami → Detroit.)
7	233	Tampa Bay Buccaneers	Autry Denson	RB	Notre Dame	from Jacksonville (Note: No. 233: Jacksonville → Tampa Bay (D). See Round 6: Tampa Bay → Jacksonville.)
7	234	San Francisco 49ers	Kory Minor	LB	Notre Dame	
7	235	New York Jets	J. J. Syvrud	LB	Jamestown	
7	236	Minnesota Vikings	Noel Scarlett	DT	Langston	
7	237	Atlanta Falcons	Todd McClure	C	LSU	
7	238	Denver Broncos	Justin Swift	TE	Kansas State	
7*	239	Arizona Cardinals	Chris Greisen	QB	NW Missouri State	
7*	240	Tampa Bay Buccaneers	Darnell McDonald	WR	Kansas State	
7*	241	New England Patriots	Sean Morey ^{†}	WR	Brown	
7*	242	Jacksonville Jaguars	Dee Moronkola	CB	Washington State	
7*	243	Dallas Cowboys	Kelvin Garmon	G	Baylor	
7*	244	Miami Dolphins	Joe Wong	T	BYU	
7*	245	Cincinnati Bengals	Scott Covington	QB	Miami (FL)	
7*	246	Jacksonville Jaguars	Chris White	DE	Southern	
7*	247	Atlanta Falcons	Rondel Menendez	WR	Eastern Kentucky	
7*	248	Buffalo Bills	Bryce Fisher	DE	Air Force	
7^	249	Cincinnati Bengals	Donald Broomfield	DT	Clemson	
7^	250	Indianapolis Colts	Corey Terry	LB	Tennessee	
7^	251	Philadelphia Eagles	Pernell Davis	DT	Alabama-Birmingham	
7^	252	St. Louis Rams	Rodney Williams	P	Georgia Tech	
7¤	253	Chicago Bears	Jim Finn	FB	Pennsylvania	from Cleveland (Note: No. 253: Cleveland → Chicago (D). See Round 7: Chicago → Cleveland.)

== Notable undrafted players ==
†	Pro Bowler

Original NFL team	Player	Pos.	College	Notes
Arizona Cardinals	Justin Lucas	CB	Abilene Christian	
Arizona Cardinals	Clarence Williams	RB	Michigan	
Atlanta Falcons	Brendon Ayanbadejo ^{†}	LB	UCLA	
Atlanta Falcons	Cornell Green	T	UCF	
Atlanta Falcons	Jay Feely ^{†}	K	Michigan	
Baltimore Ravens	Corey Chamblin	CB	Tennessee Tech	
Baltimore Ravens	Marques Douglas	DE	Howard	
Baltimore Ravens	Tywan Mitchell	WR	Mankato State	
Buffalo Bills	Keion Carpenter	S	Virginia Tech	
Buffalo Bills	Raion Hill	S	LSU	
Buffalo Bills	Jeremy McDaniel	WR	Arizona	
Carolina Panthers	Ken Amato	LB	Montana State	
Carolina Panthers	Matt Lytle	QB	Pittsburgh	
Carolina Panthers	Jamar Nesbit	G	South Carolina	
Carolina Panthers	Matt Snider	FB	Richmond	
Chicago Bears	Aaron Stecker	RB	Western Illinois	
Chicago Bears	Damon Washington	RB	Colorado State	
Cleveland Browns	Mark Campbell	TE	Michigan	
Cleveland Browns	José Cortez	K	Oregon State	
Cleveland Browns	Chris Hanson ^{†}	P	Marshall	
Cleveland Browns	Bryan Pittman	LS	Washington	
Cleveland Browns	Ronnie Powell	WR	Northwestern State	
Cleveland Browns	Tyrone Rogers	DE	Alabama State	
Dallas Cowboys	Duane Hawthorne	CB	Northern Illinois	
Dallas Cowboys	Ryan Neufeld	FB	UCLA	
Dallas Cowboys	Robert Newkirk	DT	Michigan State	
Dallas Cowboys	Alan Ricard ^{†}	FB	Northeast Louisiana	
Dallas Cowboys	Brian Waters ^{†}	G	North Texas	
Detroit Lions	Daniel Pope	P	Alabama	
Detroit Lions	Joe Tuipala	LB	San Diego State	
Green Bay Packers	Zola Davis	WR	South Carolina	
Green Bay Packers	Deon Humphrey	LB	Florida State	
Green Bay Packers	Basil Mitchell	RB	TCU	
Indianapolis Colts	Isaac Jones	WR	Purdue	
Indianapolis Colts	Chukie Nwokorie	DE	Purdue	
Indianapolis Colts	Kirby Smart	DB	Georgia	
Indianapolis Colts	Terrence Wilkins	WR	Virginia	
Jacksonville Jaguars	Lenzie Jackson	WR	Arizona State	
Jacksonville Jaguars	Stacey Mack	RB	Temple	
Jacksonville Jaguars	Anthony Mitchell	S	Tuskegee	
Jacksonville Jaguars	Micah Ross	WR	Jacksonville	
Kansas City Chiefs	Mark Word	DE	Jacksonville State	
Miami Dolphins	Robert Baker	WR	Auburn	
New England Patriots	Corey Ivy	CB	Oklahoma	
New England Patriots	Garrett Johnson	DT	Illinois	
New Orleans Saints	Corey Harris	DB	North Alabama	
New Orleans Saints	Donnie Spragan	LB	Stanford	
New York Giants	Frank Ferrara	DE	Rhode Island	
New York Giants	Bashir Levingston	CB	Eastern Washington	
New York Giants	Reggie Stephens	CB	Rutgers	
New York Jets	Delphfrine Lee	DB	McNeese State	
New York Jets	Jermaine Wiggins	TE	Georgia	
Oakland Raiders	Marlon Barnes	RB	Colorado	
Oakland Raiders	Randy Palmer	TE	Texas A&M–Kingsville	
Oakland Raiders	Barry Sims	T	Utah	
Oakland Raiders	Sam Sword	LB	Michigan	
Philadelphia Eagles	Jason Bostic	CB	Georgia Tech	
Philadelphia Eagles	Ryan Schau	T	Illinois	
Pittsburgh Steelers	Mike Schneck ^{†}	LS	Wisconsin	
Pittsburgh Steelers	Anthony Wright	QB	South Carolina	
San Diego Chargers	Fakhir Brown	CB	Grambling State	
San Diego Chargers	Larry Brown	TE	Georgia	
San Diego Chargers	Wilbert Brown	G	Houston	
San Diego Chargers	Reggie Davis	TE	Washington	
San Diego Chargers	John Reeves	LB	Purdue	
San Diego Chargers	Orlando Ruff	LB	Furman	
San Francisco 49ers	Dan Dercher	T	Kansas	
San Francisco 49ers	Damon Griffin	WR	Oregon	
San Francisco 49ers	Kelly Herndon	CB	Toledo	
San Francisco 49ers	Craig Walendy	FB	UCLA	
San Francisco 49ers	Joe Wesley	LB	LSU	
San Francisco 49ers	Joe Zelenka	LS	Wake Forest	
Seattle Seahawks	J.P. Darche	LS	Collège André-Grasset	
Seattle Seahawks	James Hill	TE	Abilene Christian	
Seattle Seahawks	Tod McBride	CB	UCLA	
Seattle Seahawks	Brian Moorman ^{†}	P	Pittsburg State	
St. Louis Rams	Matt Chatham	LB	South Dakota	
St. Louis Rams	Clifton Crosby	DB	Maryland	
St. Louis Rams	James Hodgins	FB	San Jose State	
Tampa Bay Buccaneers	Bobbie Howard	LB	Notre Dame	
Tampa Bay Buccaneers	Lemar Marshall	LB	Michigan State	
Washington Redskins	Derrius Thompson	WR	Baylor	
Washington Redskins	Rod Walker	DT	Troy State	

== Trades ==
In the explanations below, (PD) indicates trades completed prior to the start of the draft (i.e. Pre-Draft), while (D) denotes trades that took place during the 1999 draft.

Round 1

Round 2

Round 3

Round 4

Round 5

Round 6

Round 7

== Forfeited picks ==
Two selections in the 1999 draft were forfeited:

== Supplemental draft ==
A supplemental draft was held in the summer of 1999. For each player selected in the supplemental draft, the team forfeits its pick in that round in the draft of the following season. The New England Patriots were the only team to select a player, selecting cornerback J'Juan Cherry from Arizona State in the fourth round.

Rnd.	Pick	Team	Player	Pos.	College	Notes
4	—	New England Patriots	J'Juan Cherry	CB	Arizona State	

== Hall of Famers ==
- Champ Bailey, cornerback from Georgia taken 1st round 7th overall by the Washington Redskins.

Inducted: Pro Football Hall of Fame Class of 2019.

- Edgerrin James, running back from Miami (FL) taken 1st round 4th overall by the Indianapolis Colts.

Inducted: Pro Football Hall of Fame Class of 2020.
