= 1998 UCLA vs. Miami football game =

- Non-conference game
UCLA Bruins	Miami Hurricanes
(10–0)	(7–3)
45	49
Head coach: Bob Toledo	Head coach: Butch Davis
AP / Coaches / BCS; 3 / 3 / 2
	1	2	3	4	Total
UCLA	7	10	21	7	45
Miami	14	7	7	21	49
- Date: December 5, 1998
- Season: 1998
- Stadium: Miami Orange Bowl
- Location: Miami, Florida
- Favorite: UCLA by 9.5
- Attendance: 46,819

United States TV coverage
- Network: ESPN
- Announcers: Ron Franklin, Mike Gottfried, and Adrian Karsten

On December 5, 1998, the UCLA Bruins and the Miami Hurricanes faced off in an interconference college football game at the Miami Orange Bowl in Miami, Florida. The game had previously been scheduled for September 26, 1998, but was postponed from its original date due to Hurricane Georges striking southern Florida.

In a game that had national championship implications for UCLA if they had won, Miami won the game 49–45.

== Background ==
=== Postponement ===
The matchup between UCLA and Miami was to originally air on CBS as part of the network's contract with the Big East Conference, where they would air the conference’s schedule of games along with any interconference matchups where a Big East member, which Miami was at the time, was the host. However, since the game was postponed to December 5, CBS had no room for it on its schedule as they were also contractually obligated to carry the Army–Navy Game, which was taking place that same day. The game instead was carried by ESPN.

=== UCLA ===
UCLA, under head coach Bob Toledo, entered play as the third-ranked team in the nation in the Associated Press and Coaches polls and was also second in the standings of the inaugural Bowl Championship Series. They also were undefeated at 10-0 entering the contest and had won the Pac-10 championship by going 8-0 in conference play (the conference did not have a conference championship game for another decade). A win against Miami would have guaranteed them a chance to play for the inaugural BCS national championship, which was to be contested at the Fiesta Bowl in January 1999.

However, UCLA did not have much room for error. The SEC would be deciding its champion in Atlanta that day with the top-ranked team in the BCS and the Associated Press polls, undefeated Tennessee, in action against Mississippi State.

Meanwhile, in St. Louis, the Big XII Championship Game featured a third championship contender in undefeated Kansas State, who entered the game against Texas A&M as the top-ranked team in the coaches poll, the second-ranked team in the AP poll, and the third place team in the BCS.

Another team anxiously awaiting the result of the game was Florida State, the champions of the ACC who were ranked fourth. Since their season was over, as the ACC had no conference championship football game at the time, they were the only team in the top four that had zero control over their own destiny; they would need to have at least two of the three teams ranked ahead of them to lose in order to have a chance.

==== Wristband controversy ====
A players' plan by the Bruins to wear black wristbands against the Hurricanes to protest falling minority enrollment at UC-system schools was the subject of a series of emotional team meetings the week leading up to the game. The wristband issue dominated the team's normal pre-game Friday night meeting. Reflecting on the saga, OT Kris Farris stated, "This team had tremendous focus right before games, and when the topic was switched to something that wasn't about the game, I just felt 'Wow, this team is not focused.' Even that that thought entered my mind told me 'Oh, wow, I'm not sure how focused we are.'" QB Cade McNown also recalled having concerns, stating, "It was disappointing to be thinking about anything other than beating Miami. There's a time and place to make statements that are political or social. A few guys saw that as the time and place."

=== Miami ===
Miami entered the game with a 7-3 record under Butch Davis. After finishing with a losing record in 1997, the first time the Hurricanes had done so since 1979, they managed to return to form somewhat and entered the rankings after a win over then-#13 West Virginia on October 24.

Miami climbed as high as #19 in the standings before facing Syracuse at the Carrier Dome in their Big East regular-season finale. Needing a win to secure their first outright Big East conference championship in five years, which would have earned them the conference's automatic BCS bid and a spot in the Orange Bowl, Miami instead suffered one of their worst losses in program history as Syracuse won 66-13, knocking the Hurricanes from the rankings completely, and giving the Big East title and BCS bid to the Donovan McNabb-led Orangemen.

== Game summary ==
Miami led 21-17 going into halftime. UCLA took over in the 3rd quarter, scoring 3 straight touchdowns to take a 38–21 advantage late in the 3rd quarter. After a late rally by Miami to tighten the score to 45–42, UCLA began driving with hopes of running out the clock, leading to the most pivotal play of the game.

With 3:34 remaining in the fourth quarter, UCLA had a 3rd and 8 at their 44-yard line, UCLA quarterback Cade McNown completed a pass over the middle to WR Brad Melsby, who was eventually tackled at Miami's 26-yard line. As he was tackled, he fumbled the ball and Miami recovered. Replays showed that Melsby was down before the ball came loose, but as replay review didn't exist in college football back then, nothing could be done to reverse the ruling. Miami made the most of their opportunity, driving for a touchdown to take the lead 49–45 with 50 seconds remaining. Miami's defense would hold UCLA on its ensuing drive, securing the victory. Edgerrin James rushed for a Miami and Big East record 299 yards.

== Aftermath and impact ==
As UCLA exited the field, Miami fans taunted them with "Rose Bowl! Rose Bowl!" chants, since the loss meant that the Bruins would, as the Pac-10 champion, have to settle for representing the conference in the annual Rose Bowl Game against Wisconsin. The Rose Bowl had historically been seen as the ultimate destination for any Pac-10 team; with the advent of the BCS system that guaranteed a #1 vs. #2 championship game regardless of conference affiliation, it was instead viewed as a consolation prize for a UCLA team that had national championship aspirations. Had UCLA won and qualified to play for the national championship, Arizona would have received the Rose Bowl berth thanks to the Wildcats' second-place finish in the Pac-10 standings; Arizona instead played in that season's Holiday Bowl, where they defeated Nebraska 23–20. Arizona, who joined the Pac-10 in 1978, never played in the Rose Bowl before leaving the conference in 2023 and have yet to do so to this day.

UCLA, meanwhile, lost the Rose Bowl to Wisconsin by a score of 38–31; they finished ranked eighth in the AP and coaches' polls. 1998 also marked the final time that the Bruins won what eventually became the Pac-12; UCLA announced its departure to join the Big Ten for 2024 and failed to win the conference title in its final season.

Miami, meanwhile, earned a berth in the MicronPC Bowl (held in nearby Pro Player Stadium in Miami Gardens), where they dominated North Carolina State in a decisive 46-23 win. Some Miami fans have viewed the 1998 triumph over UCLA as a key moment that kickstarted Miami's rise back to the top tier of the college football landscape, which culminated in a dominant 2001 campaign.

When the day was done, Tennessee had won their game to advance to the Fiesta Bowl. Kansas State, which had a chance to clinch their own berth in the game with a win, lost to Texas A&M and thus were denied a chance to play for the national championship; their loss resulted in the team missing the BCS altogether, as they were not selected as an at-large, and after being spurned by the Cotton and Holiday Bowls they accepted a bid to the Alamo Bowl, which they also lost.

With both UCLA and Kansas State losing, which they needed to have happen in order to secure a berth in the Fiesta Bowl, Florida State qualified for their second national championship game in three years, having played in the Sugar Bowl two years earlier and lost to eventual national champion and in-state rival Florida.
