= 1998 Boston College Eagles football team =

American college football season

1998 Boston College Eagles football
- Conference: Big East Conference
- Record: 4–7 (3–4 Big East)
- Head coach: Tom O'Brien (2nd season)
- Offensive coordinator: Jeff Jagodzinski (2nd season)
- Offensive scheme: Pro-style
- Defensive coordinator: Tim Rose (2nd season)
- Base defense: 4–3
- Captains: Doug Brzezinski; Brian Maye
- Home stadium: Alumni Stadium

1998 Big East Conference football standings
	Conf.			Overall
Team	W		L	W		L
No. 25 Syracuse $	6	–	1	8	–	4
No. 20 Miami (FL)	5	–	2	9	–	3
No. 23 Virginia Tech	5	–	2	9	–	3
West Virginia	5	–	2	8	–	4
Boston College	3	–	4	4	–	7
Rutgers	2	–	5	5	–	6
Temple	2	–	5	2	–	9
Pittsburgh	0	–	7	2	–	9
$ – BCS representative as conference champion; Rankings from AP Poll

The 1998 Boston College Eagles football team represented Boston College during the 1998 NCAA Division I-A football season. Boston College was a member of the Big East Conference during the 1998 season. The Eagles played their home games in 1998 at Alumni Stadium in Chestnut Hill, Massachusetts, which has been their home stadium since 1957.

== Schedule ==
Date	Time	Opponent	Site	TV	Result	Attendance	Source
September 5	3:30 p.m.	at Georgia Tech*	Bobby Dodd Stadium; Atlanta, GA	ABC	W 41–31	38,229	
September 12	12:00 p.m.	Rutgers	Alumni Stadium; Chestnut Hill, MA	ESPN Plus	W 41–14	38,287	
September 19	12:00 p.m.	Temple	Alumni Stadium; Chestnut Hill, MA		W 31–7	40,496	
September 26	2:00 p.m.	at Louisville*	Papa John's Cardinal Stadium; Louisville, KY		L 28–52	38,231	
October 8	8:00 p.m.	No. 17 Virginia Tech	Alumni Stadium; Chestnut Hill, MA (rivalry)	ESPN	L 0–17	37,628	
October 17	3:30 p.m.	No. 23 Syracuse	Alumni Stadium; Chestnut Hill, MA	CBS	L 25–42	43,413	
October 24	12:00 p.m.	Navy*	Alumni Stadium; Chestnut Hill, MA	ESPN Plus	L 31–32	42,877	
October 31	6:00 p.m.	at No. 25 Miami (FL)	Miami Orange Bowl; Miami, FL	ESPN2	L 17–35	32,917	
November 7	12:00 p.m.	No. 13 Notre Dame*	Alumni Stadium; Chestnut Hill, MA (Holy War)	CBS	L 26–31	44,500	
November 14	12:00 p.m.	at Pittsburgh	Pitt Stadium; Pittsburgh, PA	ESPN Plus	W 23–15	32,129	
November 21	12:00 p.m.	at West Virginia	Mountaineer Field; Morgantown, WV	ESPN	L 10–35	40,573	
*Non-conference game; Rankings from AP Poll released prior to the game; All times are in Eastern time

== Roster ==
1998 Boston College Eagles football team roster
Players
Coaches
Offense

Pos.	#	Name	Class
OT	76	Darnell Alford	Jr
OL	74	Doug Brzezinski	Sr
WR	9	Derrick Crittenden	Jr
RB	21	Mike Cloud	Sr
OL	73	Dan Collins	Sr
OT	75	Marc Colombo	Fr
OL	65	Michael Cook	So
WR	45	David Coppola	Fr
OL	71	Matthew Desmarais	Fr
WR	14	Dedrick Dewalt	Fr
WR	11	Anthony DiCosmo	Sr
TE	82	Robert Ellis	So
RB	39	Nathan Funk	Fr
QB	7	Tim Hasselbeck	So
QB	2	Brian St. Pierre	Fr
OL	61	Robert Withers	Fr
OL	63	Damien Woody	Jr
G	66	Paul Zukauskas	So

Defense

Pos.	#	Name	Class
OLB	37	Nick Blevins	Fr
DB	26	Curtis Bolden	Fr
LB	54	Scott Bradley	Fr
DB	3	Pedro Cirino	Jr
LB	44	Frank Chamberlin	Jr
DT	95	Chris Hovan	Jr
DL	88	Adam Newman	Jr

Special teams

Pos.	#	Name	Class
P	43	Jason Malecki	Sr

Head coach

- Tom O'Brien

Coordinators/assistant coaches

Legend

- (C) Team captain
- (S) Suspended
- (I) Ineligible
- Injured
- Redshirt

Roster

== Team players in the NFL ==
Player	Position	Round	Pick	NFL club
Damien Woody	Center	1	17	New England Patriots
Mike Cloud	Running back	2	54	Kansas City Chiefs
Doug Brzezinski	Guard	3	64	Philadelphia Eagles
