= 1998 Insight.com Bowl =

- 10th Insight.com Bowl
West Virginia Mountaineers	Missouri Tigers
(8–3)	(7–4)
Big East	Big 12
31	34
Head coach: Don Nehlen	Head coach: Larry Smith
	AP 23
	1	2	3	4	Total
West Virginia	0	3	14	14	31
Missouri	14	10	7	3	34
- Date: December 26, 1998
- Season: 1998
- Stadium: Arizona Stadium
- Location: Tucson, Arizona
- Referee: David Witvoet (Big Ten)
- Attendance: 36,147

United States TV coverage
- Network: ESPN
- Announcers: Dave Barnett (play-by-play); Bill Curry (analysis); Dave Ryan (sidelines)

The 1998 Insight.com Bowl was the tenth edition of the Insight.com Bowl. It featured the West Virginia Mountaineers and the Missouri Tigers.

Missouri scored first, after Carlos Posey recovered a blocked field goal and returned it 70 yards for a touchdown, putting the Tigers up 7–0. Missouri's Corby Jones scored on a 9-yard touchdown run to make it 14–0 at the end of the 1st quarter. In the second quarter WVU's Jay Taylor kicked a 28-yard field goal making it 14–3. After a Missouri safety, Corby Jones rushed in for a 2-yard touchdown run to make the score 24–3 Missouri. The score would hold up until halftime.

In the third quarter, Marc Bulger threw a 9-yard touchdown pass to David Saunders, bringing the Mountaineers to 24–10. Missouri answered with an 11-yard touchdown run from Corby Jones, pushing the lead back to 31–10. Bulger threw another touchdown pass to Khori Ivy to make the score 31–17 at the end of the third quarter.

In the fourth quarter, Bulger threw a 9-yard touchdown pass to Amos Zereoué to make it 31–24. Brian Long kicked an 18-yard field goal to make it 34–24 Missouri. Bulger threw a 1-yard touchdown pass to Saunders, to make the final score 34–31. The win was Missouri's first bowl game victory since 1981.
