= Bud Foster =

American football player and coach (born 1959)

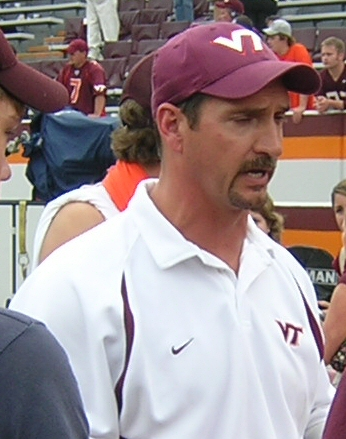
- Foster with Virginia Tech in 2004

Current position
- Title: Defensive advisor/analyst
- Team: Virginia Tech
- Conference: ACC

Biographical details
- Born: July 28, 1959 (age 67); Somerset, Kentucky, U.S.

Playing career
- 1977–1980: Murray State
- Positions: Strong safety, linebacker

Coaching career (HC unless noted)
- 1981–1982: Murray State (GA)
- 1983–1985: Murray State (OLB)
- 1986: Murray State (LB/ST)
- 1987: Virginia Tech (ILB)
- 1988–1992: Virginia Tech (OLB)
- 1993: Virginia Tech (LB/ST)
- 1994: Virginia Tech (ILB/ST)
- 1995–2015: Virginia Tech (DC/ILB)
- 2016–2019: Virginia Tech (AHC/DC/LB)

Administrative career (AD unless noted)
- 2020–present: Virginia Tech (special assistant to AD)

Accomplishments and honors

Awards
- Frank Broyles Award (2006); AFCA Defensive Coordinator of the Year (2000)

Robert Eugene "Bud" Foster Jr. (born July 28, 1959) is an American retired college football coach and former player. He currently serves as a defensive advisor/analyst for the Virginia Tech Hokies. Following the 2006 season, he received the Frank Broyles Award, which is annually given to the top assistant coach in college football. Foster's 2005 and 2006 Hokie defenses led the nation in total defense. During his career Foster was regarded as one of the best defensive coordinators in college football. On August 1, 2019, Foster announced he was retiring at the end of the 2019 season.

Since taking on his first coaching position at Virginia Tech in 1987, Foster coached over 50 players that were drafted in the NFL including first-round draft picks DeAngelo Hall, Kyle Fuller, Tremaine Edmunds and Terrell Edmunds; Pro Bowlers Hall, Brandon Flowers and Kam Chancellor and Super Bowl champions Chancellor, Roger Brown, Tyronne Drakeford, Cornell Brown, Pierson Prioleau, and Kendall Fuller. Foster also coached former All-Americans John Engelberger, Anthony Midget, Corey Moore, Ben Taylor, Ronyell Whitaker, David Pugh, Willie Pile, Darryl Tapp, Jimmy Williams, and Xavier Adibi.

== Playing career ==
Foster went to high school in Nokomis, Illinois. A 1981 graduate of Murray State University, Foster played strong safety and outside linebacker for the Murray State Racers from 1977 to 1980.

== Coaching career ==
=== Murray State ===
Foster began his coaching career as a graduate assistant at Murray State in 1981, Frank Beamer's first season as the head coach. After two years as a graduate assistant, Foster was elevated to a full-time staff position. He coached outside linebackers for three seasons before taking over the inside linebackers as well in 1986. He also served as the Racers' recruiting coordinator and worked with special teams.

=== Virginia Tech ===
Foster moved with head coach Beamer to Virginia Tech in 1987 and became the inside linebackers coach. He coached the outside linebackers for the next five seasons. Foster assumed responsibility for both sets of linebackers prior to the 1993 season and also took over special-teams coaching that year. The following year, he coached the inside linebackers and special teams. Foster assumed the position of co-defensive coordinator in 1995 and took over as the sole defensive coordinator in 1996.

After helping Virginia Tech to the national championship game (Sugar Bowl) in 1999, Foster was recognized as the 2000 American Football Coaches Association Defensive Coordinator of the Year. Tech's 1999 defensive unit led Division I-A in scoring defense and ranked third in both total and rushing defense.

Under Foster's coaching, the Hokies' 2001 defense proved to be one of the nation's best, ranking among the top eight teams in Division I-A in six different categories and leading the way in shutouts with four. In 2000, Foster took a defense that returned just three starters and turned it into a unit that led the Big East Conference in rushing defense, placed 16th nationally against the run and tied for third nationally in interceptions. He won the Frank Broyles Award in 2006.

Towards the end of the 2014 season, Foster signed a five-year extension with Virginia Tech.

Following the retirement of Frank Beamer, Foster was promoted to Associate Head coach under new head coach Justin Fuente for the 2016 season.

Foster announced his retirement, which was effective at the end of the 2019 season. Going into his final season, Foster's defenses at Virginia Tech led all FBS programs in sacks and interceptions since he was promoted to defensive coordinator. His 33 seasons at Virginia Tech made him the longest serving assistant coach at the same school. Foster led seven different defensive units that finished number one in the country in total defense.

==== "Lunch pail defense" ====
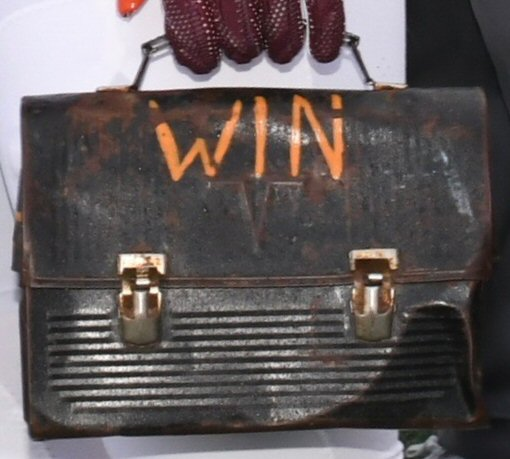
Virginia Tech lunch pail during the 2018 season

Since the 1995 season, a battered metal lunch pail has been the symbol of Virginia Tech's blue-collar mentality on defense. Each week a list of goals is put in the lunch pail and a player is chosen to have the honor of carrying the lunch pail onto the sidelines. The Lunch Pail Defense Foundation was founded to fund academic scholarships for students from the area near Blacksburg, Virginia.

== Personal life ==
Foster was named as a recipient the Distinguished Alumni Award at Murray State in 2022.

=== Statistics ===
Foster's defenses consistently rank among the top in the nation. Below are Virginia Tech's defensive statistics since 1995.

Season	Rushing defense		Passing defense		Total defense		‡ Scoring defense	
	Actual	†Ranking (Conf)	Actual	†Ranking (Conf)	Actual	†Ranking (Conf)	Actual	†Ranking (Conf)
1995	77.4	#1 (#1 BE)	208.5	N/A	285.9	#10 (#1 BE)	14.1	#5 (#1 BE)
1996	112.0	#19 (#3 BE)	204.1	N/A	316.1	#24 (#4 BE)	15.3	#9 (#2 BE)
1997	118.9	#30 (#2 BE)	208.0	N/A	326.9	#26 (#2 BE)	16.8	#13 (#2 BE)
1998	102.2	#11 (#1 BE)	182.7	N/A	284.9	#7 (#1 BE)	12.9	#4 (#1 BE)
1999	75.9	#3 (#1 BE)	171.4	#8 (#1 BE)	247.3	#3 (#1 BE)	10.5	#1 (#1 BE)
2000	99.27	#16 (#1 BE)	224.36	#77 (#6 BE)	323.64	#27 (#2 BE)	22.64	#45 (#4 BE)
2001	71.64	#2 (#1 BE)	166.27	#8 (#4 BE)	237.91	#2 (#2 BE)	13.36	#2 (#2 BE)
2002	121.43	#29 (#3 BE)	213.64	#56 (#7 BE)	335.07	#32 (#4 BE)	18.79	#21 (#2 BE)
2003	136.00	#39 (#4 BE)	231.46	#76 (#7 BE)	367.46	#51 (#4 BE)	23.00	#45 (#3 BE)
2004	115.23	#21 (#4 ACC)	152.77	#4 (#2 ACC)	268.00	#4 (#2 ACC)	12.85	#2 (#1 ACC)
2005	93.38	#8 (#2 ACC)	154.23	#3 (#2 ACC)	247.62	#1 (#1 ACC)	12.92	#2 (#1 ACC)
2006	91.23	#11 (#2 ACC)	128.23	#1 (#1 ACC)	219.46	#1 (#1 ACC)	11.00	#1 (#1 ACC)
2007	86.64	#5 (#2 ACC)	210.29	#31 (#4 ACC)	296.93	#4 (#1 ACC)	16.07	#3 (#1 ACC)
2008	104.43	#14 (#2 ACC)	175.00	#16 (#5 ACC)	279.43	#7 (#2 ACC)	16.71	#9 (#1 ACC)
2009	128.38	#40 (#4 ACC)	167.08	#11 (#2 ACC)	295.46	#12 (#2 ACC)	15.62	#9 (#1 ACC)
2010	155.93	#64 (#7 ACC)	205.57	#40 (#5 ACC)	361.50	#52 (#8 ACC)	20.57	#26 (#4 ACC)
2011	104.07	#14 (#2 ACC)	200.57	#31 (#4 ACC)	304.64	#10 (#2 ACC)	17.64	#7 (#2 ACC)
2012	134.08	#29 (#3 ACC)	199.08	#24 (#2 ACC)	333.15	#18 (#2 ACC)	22.85	#32 (#2 ACC)
2013	110.9	#10 (#1 ACC)	172.7	#8 (#2 ACC)	283.6	#4 (#2 ACC)	19.3	#11 (#2 ACC)
2014	144.8	#39 (#7 ACC)	199.0	#25 (#5 ACC)	343.8	#21 (#5 ACC)	20.2	#14 (#2 ACC)
2015	180.7	#75 (#11 ACC)	189.2	#19 (#4 ACC)	369.8	#44 (#9 ACC)	26.3	#59 (#11 ACC)
2016	140.5	#32 (#8 ACC)	200.2	#26 (#3 ACC)	340.7	#18 (#4 ACC)	22.8	#28 (#5 ACC)
2017	119.5	#15 (#2 ACC)	199.8	#33 (#6 ACC)	319.3	#13 (#2 ACC)	14.8	#4 (#2 ACC)
2018	210.3	#106 (#12 ACC)	228.4	#63 (#8 ACC)	438.7	#98 (#11 ACC)	31.0	#85 (#10 ACC)
2019	139.3	#46 (#5 ACC)	224.0	#63 (#5 ACC)	363.3	#42 (#4 ACC)	24.7	#46 (#5 ACC)
All statistics from the NCAA. † National rankings are among the teams in the football bowl subdivision (formerly called Division I-A), which currently consists of 127 teams. The Big East Conference had 8 teams. The ACC had 11 teams in 2004, 12 teams from 2005 to 2012, and 14 teams from 2013 to present. ‡ Scoring defense also includes touchdowns allowed by the offense and special teams.
