= Dennis McKinley =

American football player (born 1976)

No. 39
- Position: Fullback

Personal information
- Born: November 3, 1976 (age 50); Kosciusko, Mississippi, U.S.
- Listed height: 6 ft 2 in (1.88 m)
- Listed weight: 250 lb (113 kg)

Career information
- High school: Weir (Weirton, West Virginia)
- College: Mississippi State
- NFL draft: 1999: 6th round, 206th overall pick

Career history
- Arizona Cardinals (1999–2002)

Career NFL statistics
- Total Tackles: 26
- Receptions: 4
- Receiving yards: 27
- Stats at Pro Football Reference

Dennis L. McKinley (born November 3, 1976) is an American former professional football player who was a fullback for the Arizona Cardinals of the National Football League (NFL). He was selected in the sixth round of the 1999 NFL draft. He played college football for the Mississippi State Bulldogs.

During McKinley's NFL tenure he was primarily used on special teams, and he only started 1 game (out of 58) at Fullback in his 4-year career.

He was arrested for drug trafficking in 2003 and was subsequently released by the Cardinals, McKinley would be found guilty of Conspiracy and 3 Felony drug crimes. Arizona V. Dennis McKinley, S-0700-CR-2003017374 (Maricopa County Superior Court March 1, 2007).

In 2012, McKinley filed a Workers' compensation claim in California, citing cumulative injury during his time with the Arizona Cardinals. His claim was denied by a Workers' Compensation Administrative Law Judge (WCJ). In 2013, he was granted reconsideration, however, his claim was once again denied by the Workers' Compensation Appeals Board of California (WCAB), choosing not to exercise their jurisdiction.
