= 1998 Virginia Tech Hokies football team =

American college football season

1998 Virginia Tech Hokies football

Music City Bowl champion

Music City Bowl, W 38–7 vs. Alabama
- Conference: Big East Conference

Ranking
- Coaches: No. 19
- AP: No. 23
- Record: 9–3 (5–2 Big East)
- Head coach: Frank Beamer (12th season)
- Offensive coordinator: Rickey Bustle (5th season)
- Offensive scheme: Multiple
- Defensive coordinator: Bud Foster (4th season)
- Base defense: 4–4
- Home stadium: Lane Stadium

1998 Big East Conference football standings
	Conf.			Overall
Team	W		L	W		L
No. 25 Syracuse $	6	–	1	8	–	4
No. 20 Miami (FL)	5	–	2	9	–	3
No. 23 Virginia Tech	5	–	2	9	–	3
West Virginia	5	–	2	8	–	4
Boston College	3	–	4	4	–	7
Rutgers	2	–	5	5	–	6
Temple	2	–	5	2	–	9
Pittsburgh	0	–	7	2	–	9
$ – BCS representative as conference champion; Rankings from AP Poll

The 1998 Virginia Tech Hokies football team represented Virginia Tech as a member of the Big East Conference during the 1998 NCAA Division I-A football season. Led by 12th-year head coach Frank Beamer, the Hokies compiled an overall record of 9–3 with a mark of 5–2 in conference play, placing in a three-way tie for second in the Big East. Virginia Tech was invited to the Music City Bowl, where the Hokies defeated Alabama. The team played home games at Lane Stadium in Blacksburg, Virginia.

== Schedule ==
Date	Time	Opponent	Rank	Site	TV	Result	Attendance	Source
September 5	4:00 p.m.	East Carolina*		Lane Stadium; Blacksburg, VA	HTS	W 38–3	48,134	
September 12	1:00 p.m.	at Clemson*		Memorial Stadium; Clemson, SC		W 37–0	66,431	
September 19	8:00 p.m.	at Miami (FL)		Miami Orange Bowl; Miami, FL (rivalry)	ESPN	W 27–20 ^{OT}	41,155	
September 26	12:00 p.m.	Pittsburgh	No. 21	Lane Stadium; Blacksburg, VA	ESPN2	W 27–7	50,057	
October 8	8:00 p.m.	at Boston College	No. 17	Alumni Stadium; Chestnut Hill, MA (rivalry)	ESPN	W 17–0	37,628	
October 17	1:00 p.m.	Temple^{†}	No. 14	Lane Stadium; Blacksburg, VA		L 24–28	47,610	
October 24	7:00 p.m.	at UAB*	No. 23	Legion Field; Birmingham, AL		W 41–0	31,897	
October 31	12:00 p.m.	No. 21 West Virginia	No. 20	Lane Stadium; Blacksburg, VA (rivalry)	ESPN+	W 27–13	52,807	
November 14	8:00 p.m.	at Syracuse	No. 16	Carrier Dome; Syracuse, NY	ESPN2	L 26–28	49,336	
November 21	1:00 p.m.	Rutgers	No. 23	Lane Stadium; Blacksburg, VA		W 47–7	42,452	
November 28	12:00 p.m.	No. 16 Virginia*	No. 20	Lane Stadium; Blacksburg, VA (rivalry)	ESPN	L 32–36	53,207	
December 29	5:00 p.m.	vs. Alabama*		Vanderbilt Stadium; Nashville, TN (Music City Bowl)	ESPN	W 38–7	41,600	
*Non-conference game; ^{†}Homecoming; Rankings from AP Poll released prior to the game; All times are in Eastern time

== Rankings ==
Ranking movements Legend: ██ Increase in ranking ██ Decrease in ranking — = Not ranked
	Week															
Poll	Pre	1	2	3	4	5	6	7	8	9	10	11	12	13	14	Final
AP	—	—	—	21	19	17	14	23	20	15	16	23	20	25	—	23
Coaches Poll	—	—	21	19	16	15	10	21	17	14	12	20	19	24	24	19
BCS	Not released								—	—	20	—	—	—	—	Not released

== Game Summaries ==
=== East Carolina ===
East Carolina at Virginia Tech

Team	1	2	3	4	Total
East Carolina	0	0	3	0	3
• Virginia Tech	10	7	14	7	38

- Date: September 5, 1998
- Location: Lane Stadium
- Game start: 4:06 PM EDT
- Elapsed time: 2:42
- Game attendance: 48,134
- Game weather: Clear; 86°F; 5-8WSW
- Referee: Rg Detillier

Scoring summary
1	9:17	VT	Shayne Graham 28-yard Field Goal	VT 3–0
1	2:40	VT	Ricky Hall 20-yard pass from Al Clark (Shayne Graham kick)	VT 10–0
2	3:33	VT	Lamont Pegues 1-yard run (Shayne Graham kick)	VT 17–0
3	11:06	ECU	Brantley Rivers 30-yard Field Goal	VT 17–3
3	6:26	VT	Ken Handy 29-yard pass from Al Clark (Shayne Graham kick)	VT 24–3
3	1:49	VT	Shyrone Stith 18-yard run (Shayne Graham kick)	VT 31–0
4	3:15	VT	Andre Kendrick 10-yard run (Shayne Graham kick)	VT 38–3

=== Clemson ===
Virginia Tech at Clemson

Team	1	2	3	4	Total
• Virginia Tech	3	31	3	0	37
Clemson	0	0	0	0	0

- Date: September 12, 1998
- Location: Death Valley
- Game start: 1:00 PM EDT
- Elapsed time: 2:59
- Game attendance: 72,000
- Game weather: Sunny; 82°F; calm
- Referee: John Smith

Scoring summary
1	3:59	VT	Shayne Graham 25-yard Field Goal	VT 3–0
2	14:56	VT	Al Clark 1-yard run. (Shayne Graham kick)	VT 10–0
2	9:00	VT	Al Clark 10-yard run (Shayne Graham kick)	VT 17–0
2	5:15	VT	Ricky Hall 56-yard pass from Al Clark (Shayne Graham kick)	VT 24–0
2	4:04	VT	Lamont Pegues 1-yard run. (Shayne Graham kick)	VT 31–0
2	0:00	VT	Shayne Graham 20-yard Field Goal	VT 34–0
3	6:43	VT	Shayne Graham 53-yard Field Goal	VT 37–0

Bud Foster's defense carried the Hokies to victory, pitching a shutout 37-0 over the Clemson Tigers. The Hokie D absolutely stifled Clemson, holding them to 9 first downs and only 102 yards of total offense. QB Brandon Streeter threw 4 interceptions and the Tigers could only manage 31 yards on the ground. The Hokie offense also struggled, with Al Clark completing only 4 of 20 first half passes. Despite the struggles, Tech's yards per play was 4.4 to Clemson's 1.8. The Hokies added big plays like Clark's 56-yard bomb to Ricky Hall for a TD and Angelo Harrison's 42 yard punt return which led to a field goal.

== Roster ==
1998 Virginia Tech Hokies football team roster
Players
Coaches
Offense

Pos.	#	Name	Class
CB	2	Ronyell Whitaker	Fr
TB	4	Andre Kendrick	RSo
QB	5	Al Clark	RSr
TB	7	Lamont Pegues	RSr
FB	11	Grant Noel	Fr
QB	13	Dave Meyer	RSo
QB	18	Denny Randolph	RSo
QB	18	Michael Vick	Fr
FL	19	Greg Shockley	RSo
FB	21	Manny Clemente	RSo
SE	23	Mike Donahue	RSo
FB	27	Jarrett Ferguson	RSo
FB	28	Wayne Briggs	RFr
FL	29	Rashad Jenkins	So
FL	31	Reggie Samuel	RFr
TB	32	Wayne Ward	RFr
FB	36	Chris Steadley	RSo
TB	38	Shyrone Stith	RSo
FB	42	Cullen Hawkins	Jr
FB	44	Browning Wynn	RFr
FB	45	Benny Wolfe	So
SE	48	Ken Handy	Sr
FB	49	Derek Piniella	RFr
G	50	Brian Flinchum	So
C	52	Keith Short	RJr
G	55	Robbie Lewis	RFr
G	57	Dwight Vick	RSr
OT	58	Matt Wincek	Fr
OT	59	Anthony Lambo	RSo
G	60	David Campbell	RJr
C	61	Steve DeMasi	So
C	62	Tim Schnecker	Jr
C	63	Joe Marchant	Jr
OT	66	Jeff Hartzog	So
OT	69	Matt Lehr	So
OT	70	Troy Smith	RFr
G	72	Daniel Nihipali	Jr
OT	74	Derek Smith	RSr
OT	75	Robert Adams	Jr
OT	76	Dave Kadela	So
G	79	Josh Redding	RSo
TE	80	Greg Myers	RSo
SE	81	Brian Remley	RSo
SE	82	Ricky Hall	RJr
FL	83	Angelo Harrison	Sr
TE	85	Derek Carter	So
TE	87	Bob Slowikowski	RFr
SE	88	Andre Davis	RFr
FL	89	Robert Wimberly	RFr

Defense

Pos.	#	Name	Class
FS	1	Keion Carpenter	Sr
LB	2	Tyron Edmond	Sr
CB	3	Ike Charlton	RSo
LB	6	Lorenzo Ferguson	RSo
LB	8	Phillip Summers	RSo
CB	9	Anthony Midget	Jr
CB	12	Loren Johnson	Sr
FS	14	Nick Sorensen	RSo
ROV	16	Cory Bird	RSo
ROV	20	Pierson Prioleau	Sr
CB	24	Larry Austin	RFr
LB	30	Tee Butler	RSo
FS	33	Steven Hunt	Jr
LB	34	Brian Welch	RFr
LB	37	Jamie Forrest	RSo
ROV	40	Chris Krebs	RFr
LB	41	Ben Taylor	Fr
LB	43	Michael Hawkes	RJr
LB	46	Jamel Smith	RJr
DE	47	Ryan Smith	RSr
DE	51	Ron Cook	RFr
DT	53	Jason Buckland	Sr
DE	54	Dan Wilkinson	RFr
DE	56	Corey Moore	RJr
DT	64	Franklin Bowser	RSo
DT	65	Tim Selmon	Fr
DT	67	Jason Raynor	So
DT	71	David Pugh	RFr
DT	77	Carl Bradley	Jr
DT	92	Nat Williams	RJr
DE	93	Rick Wright	RFr
DT	94	Chad Beasley	RFr
DE	96	John Engelberger	RJr
DE	97	Jim Ferugio	RFr
DE	98	Darrius Monroe	So
DE	99	Chris Cyrus	RJr

Special teams

Pos.	#	Name	Class
PK	17	Shayne Graham	Jr
LS	25	Shane Beamer	RJr
LS	68	Cliff Anders	Jr
H	91	Caleb Hurd	Jr
P	95	Jimmy Kibble	RJr

Head coach

- Frank Beamer

Coordinators/assistant coaches

- Bud Foster (Defensive Coordinator, Inside Linebackers, Special Teams)
- Ricky Bustle (Offensive Coordinator, Quarterbacks Coach)
- Billy Hite (Assistant Head Coach, Running Backs Coach)
- Tony Ball (Wide Receivers Coach)
- Jim Cavanaugh (Strong Safety, Outside Linebackers Coach)
- Danny Pearman (Tight Ends, Offensive Tackles Coach)
- Bryan Stinespring (Offensive Line Coach)
- Lou West (Defensive Backfield Coach)
- Charley Wiles (Defensive Line Coach)
- John Ballein (Assistant Athletic Director for Football Operations)
- Daniel Ferrell (Graduate Assistant)
- Jon Shields (Graduate Assistant)

Legend

- (C) Team captain
- (S) Suspended
- (I) Ineligible
- Injured
- Redshirt

Roster
Last update: 2026-10-01 (Archived 1998-12-02)
