= 1998 Pittsburgh Panthers football team =

American college football season

1998 Pittsburgh Panthers football
- Conference: Big East Conference
- Record: 2–9 (0–7 Big East)
- Head coach: Walt Harris (2nd season)
- Offensive coordinator: Steve Mooshagian (2nd season)
- Offensive scheme: West Coast
- Defensive coordinator: Larry Coyer (2nd season)
- Base defense: Multiple 4–3
- Home stadium: Pitt Stadium

1998 Big East Conference football standings
	Conf.			Overall
Team	W		L	W		L
No. 25 Syracuse $	6	–	1	8	–	4
No. 20 Miami (FL)	5	–	2	9	–	3
No. 23 Virginia Tech	5	–	2	9	–	3
West Virginia	5	–	2	8	–	4
Boston College	3	–	4	4	–	7
Rutgers	2	–	5	5	–	6
Temple	2	–	5	2	–	9
Pittsburgh	0	–	7	2	–	9
$ – BCS representative as conference champion; Rankings from AP Poll

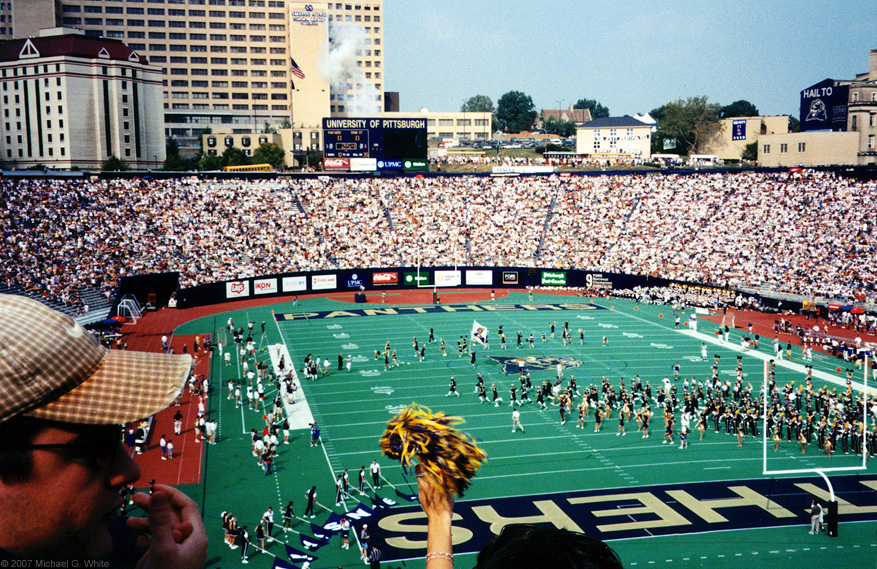
A view of Pitt Stadium before the Penn State game

The 1998 Pittsburgh Panthers football team represented the University of Pittsburgh in the 1998 NCAA Division I-A football season. Future Iowa State head coach Matt Campbell was a member of the team.

== Schedule ==
Date	Time	Opponent	Site	TV	Result	Attendance	Source
September 5	3:30 p.m.	Villanova*	Pitt Stadium; Pittsburgh, PA		W 48–41	36,543	
September 19	3:30 p.m.	No. 8 Penn State*	Pitt Stadium; Pittsburgh, PA (rivalry)	CBS	L 13–20	56,743	
September 26	12:00 p.m.	at No. 19 Virginia Tech	Lane Stadium; Blacksburg, VA	ESPN2	L 7–27	50,057	
October 3	3:30 p.m.	Akron*	Pitt Stadium; Pittsburgh, PA		W 35–0	37,357	
October 10	1:30 p.m.	at North Carolina*	Kenan Memorial Stadium; Chapel Hill, NC		L 10–29	50,900	
October 17	12:00 p.m.	Rutgers^{†}	Pitt Stadium; Pittsburgh, PA	ESPN Plus	L 21–25	31,176	
October 31	12:00 p.m.	at No. 19 Syracuse	Carrier Dome; Syracuse, NY (rivalry)	ESPN Plus	L 28–45	49,012	
November 7	3:30 p.m.	Temple	Pitt Stadium; Pittsburgh, PA		L 33–34	39,827	
November 14	12:00 p.m.	Boston College	Pitt Stadium; Pittsburgh, PA	ESPN Plus	L 15–23	32,129	
November 19	8:00 p.m.	at No. 22 Miami (FL)	Miami Orange Bowl; Miami, FL	ESPN	L 10–38	38,084	
November 27	2:30 p.m.	West Virginia	Three Rivers Stadium; Pittsburgh, PA (Backyard Brawl)	CBS	L 14–52	42,254	
*Non-conference game; ^{†}Homecoming; Rankings from AP Poll released prior to the game; All times are in Eastern time

== Personnel ==
=== Roster ===
1998 Pittsburgh Panthers football team roster
Players
Coaches
Offense

Pos.	#	Name	Class
RB	43	Kevan Barlow	So
WR	80	Antonio Bryant	Fr
RB	24	Nick Goings	So
TE	93	Benjamin Kopp	Jr
WR	6	Julius Dixon	Jr
WR	84	R. J. English	Fr
QB	8	Matt Lytle	Sr
OL	70	Joe Manganello	Fr
TE	88	Kirk McMullen	Jr
FB	44	Rickey Mendenhall	Fr
QB	1	Tyler Novak	Fr
QB	9	Matt O'Connor	Jr
FB	23	Dan Owen	So

Defense

Pos.	#	Name	Class
DE	57	Bryan Knight	Fr
DB	31	Hank Poteat	Jr
DB	25	Ramon Walker	Fr

Special teams

Pos.	#	Name	Class
LS	46	John Parker	Jr

Head coach

- Walt Harris

Coordinators/assistant coaches

Legend

- (C) Team captain
- (S) Suspended
- (I) Ineligible
- Injured
- Redshirt

=== Coaching staff ===
1998 Pittsburgh Panthers football staff
Coaching staff: Walt Harris – Head coach; Larry Coyer – Defensive coordinator; Steve Mooshagian – Offensive coordinator/wide receivers; J.D. Brookhart – Tight ends/special teams Assistant; Curt Cignetti – Recruiting doordinator/quarterbacks; Tom Freeman – Offensive line; Bob Junko – Defensive tackles; Bill McGovern – Defensive backs; Vincent White – Running backs; Brian Williams – Defensive ends/special teams	Support staff: Chris LaSala – Director of football operations; Dave Henigan – Graduate assistant; Joe Ferenc – Graduate assistant; Joe Moorhead – Graduate assistant	Strength and conditioning staff: Buddy Morris – Strength and conditioning coach; Chad Hutsko – Assistant strength and conditioning coach

== Team players drafted into the NFL ==
Player	Position	Round	Pick	NFL club
No Players Selected
