= Kirk McMullen =

American football player (born 1977)

No. 43
- Position: Tight end

Personal information
- Born: July 19, 1977 (age 49); Imperial, Pennsylvania, U.S.
- Listed height: 6 ft 4 in (1.93 m)
- Listed weight: 255 lb (116 kg)

Career information
- High school: West Allegheny
- College: Pittsburgh
- NFL draft: 2000: undrafted

Career history
- Kansas City Chiefs (2000)*; Cincinnati Bengals (2000–2002)
- * Offseason or practice squad member only
- Stats at Pro Football Reference

Kirk Lawrence McMullen (born July 19, 1977) is an American former football tight end who played for the Cincinnati Bengals of the National Football League (NFL). He played college football at University of Pittsburgh.
