= 1998 Temple Owls football team =

American college football season

1998 Temple Owls football
- Conference: Big East Conference
- Record: 2–9 (2–5 Big East)
- Head coach: Bobby Wallace (1st season)
- Offensive coordinator: Al Kincaid (1st season)
- Defensive coordinator: Raymond Monica (1st season)
- Home stadium: Veterans Stadium; Franklin Field

1998 Big East Conference football standings
	Conf.			Overall
Team	W		L	W		L
No. 25 Syracuse $	6	–	1	8	–	4
No. 20 Miami (FL)	5	–	2	9	–	3
No. 23 Virginia Tech	5	–	2	9	–	3
West Virginia	5	–	2	8	–	4
Boston College	3	–	4	4	–	7
Rutgers	2	–	5	5	–	6
Temple	2	–	5	2	–	9
Pittsburgh	0	–	7	2	–	9
$ – BCS representative as conference champion; Rankings from AP Poll

The 1998 Temple Owls football team represented Temple University as a member of the Big East Conference during the 1998 NCAA Division I-A football season. Led by first-year head coach Bobby Wallace, the Owls compiled an overall record of 2–9 with a mark of 2–5 in conference play, tying for sixth place in the Big East. Temple played home games at Veterans Stadium and Franklin Field in Philadelphia.

== Schedule ==
Date	Time	Opponent	Site	Result	Attendance	Source
September 5		at Toledo*	Glass Bowl; Toledo, OH	L 12–24		
September 12		Akron*	Franklin Field; Philadelphia, PA	L 28–35		
September 19	12:00 p.m.	at Boston College	Alumni Stadium; Chestnut Hill, MA	L 7–31	40,496	
September 26		at Maryland*	Byrd Stadium; College Park, MD	L 20–30	27,047	
October 3		No. 13 (I-AA) William & Mary*	Veterans Stadium; Philadelphia, PA	L 38–45	16,281	
October 10	12:00 p.m.	No. 16 West Virginia	Veterans Stadium; Philadelphia, PA	L 7–37	14,851	
October 17	1:00 p.m.	at No. 14 Virginia Tech	Lane Stadium; Blacksburg, VA	W 28–24	47,610	
October 31		at Rutgers	Rutgers Stadium; Piscataway, NJ	L 10–21		
November 7	3:30 p.m.	at Pittsburgh	Pitt Stadium; Pittsburgh, PA	W 34–33	39,827	
November 14	4:00 p.m.	No. 24 Miami (FL)	Veterans Stadium; Philadelphia, PA	L 7–42	18,734	
November 21	4:00 p.m.	No. 24 Syracuse	Veterans Stadium; Philadelphia, PA	L 7–38	12,483	
*Non-conference game; Rankings from AP Poll released prior to the game; All times are in Eastern time
