= Reggie Stephens (cornerback) =

American football player (born 1975)

No. 46, 28, 29, 34
- Position: Cornerback

Personal information
- Born: February 21, 1975 (age 51); Shreveport, Louisiana, U.S.
- Listed height: 5 ft 10 in (1.78 m)
- Listed weight: 200 lb (91 kg)

Career information
- High school: Santa Cruz (Santa Cruz, California)
- College: Rutgers
- NFL draft: 1999: undrafted

Career history
- New York Giants (1999–2000); Kansas City Chiefs (2002)*; New York Giants (2002); (2003); Denver Broncos (2004)*; Nashville Kats (2005–2006)
- * Offseason or practice squad member only
- Stats at Pro Football Reference

Reggie Stephens (born February 21, 1975) is an American former professional football player who was a cornerback in the National Football League (NFL) and in the Arena Football League (AFL). He played college football for the Rutgers Scarlet Knights.

== Early life ==
Stephens was born in Shreveport, Louisiana. At age 15, he moved to Santa Cruz, California, where he attended Santa Cruz High School and played high school football with Brendon Ayanbadejo. Stephens also competed in the boy's 100- and 200-meter dash, long jump, and 400-meter relay at Santa Cruz High. Stephens is now listed in the Santa Cruz High School Athletics Hall of Fame and Scott’s Valley High for his achievements in these sports and coaching

== College career ==
After graduating from Santa Cruz High, Stephens played junior college football at Cabrillo College in Aptos, California. He was then accepted to Rutgers University–New Brunswick, where he played college football for the Rutgers Scarlet Knights. In his senior year, Stephens won the Homer Hazel Trophy, as MVP of the 1998 Rutgers Scarlet Knights football team, and was named First Team All-Big East by The Football News. He played in the East–West Shrine Bowl in January 1999 at Stanford Stadium.

== Professional career ==
Stephens played for the NFL's New York Giants between 1999 and 2003. During his second season, in 2000, he recorded three interceptions and was a standout special teams player, helping the Giants reach Super Bowl XXXV.

== After Football ==
After he retired from playing, Stephens became a youth sports advocate. In 2017 he returned to Santa Cruz and founded the Reggie Stephens Foundation. The foundation trains boys and girls in baseketball and football. Stephens has also been an advisor to the Golden State Storm women's football team.
