= 1998 Syracuse Orangemen football team =

American college football season

1998 Syracuse Orangemen football

Big East champion Lambert-Meadowlands Trophy

Orange Bowl, L 10–31 vs. Florida
- Conference: Big East Conference

Ranking
- Coaches: No. 24
- AP: No. 25
- Record: 8–4 (6–1 Big East)
- Head coach: Paul Pasqualoni (8th season)
- Offensive coordinator: Kevin Rogers (2nd season)
- Defensive coordinator: George DeLeone (1st season)
- Captains: Scott Kiernan; Rob Konrad; Donovan McNabb; Jason Poles
- Home stadium: Carrier Dome

1998 Big East Conference football standings
	Conf.			Overall
Team	W		L	W		L
No. 25 Syracuse $	6	–	1	8	–	4
No. 20 Miami (FL)	5	–	2	9	–	3
No. 23 Virginia Tech	5	–	2	9	–	3
West Virginia	5	–	2	8	–	4
Boston College	3	–	4	4	–	7
Rutgers	2	–	5	5	–	6
Temple	2	–	5	2	–	9
Pittsburgh	0	–	7	2	–	9
$ – BCS representative as conference champion; Rankings from AP Poll

The 1998 Syracuse Orangemen football team represented Syracuse University as a member of the Big East Conference during the 1998 NCAA Division I-A football season. Led by eighth-year head coach Paul Pasqualoni, the Orangemen compiled an overall record of 8–4 with a mark of 6–1 in conference play, winning the Big East title. Syracuse was invited to the Orange Bowl, where the Orangemen lost to Florida. The team played home games at the Carrier Dome in Syracuse, New York.

Syracuse University collected the largest share of the $141.2-million pot that was split among bowl games participating universities. Syracuse received nearly $4.7-million, through its affiliation with the Big East Conference.

== Schedule ==
Date	Time	Opponent	Rank	Site	TV	Result	Attendance	Source
September 5	12:30 pm	No. 10 Tennessee*	No. 17	Carrier Dome; Syracuse, NY	ESPN	L 33–34	49,550	
September 12	3:30 pm	at No. 13 Michigan*	No. 19	Michigan Stadium; Ann Arbor, MI	ABC	W 38–28	111,012	
September 19	12:00 pm	Rutgers	No. 13	Carrier Dome; Syracuse, NY	ESPN Plus	W 70–14	42,716	
October 1	8:00 pm	at NC State*	No. 11	Carter–Finley Stadium; Raleigh, NC	ESPN	L 17–38	51,200	
October 10	5:30 pm	Cincinnati*	No. 24	Carrier Dome; Syracuse, NY	ESPN2	W 63–21	47,251	
October 17	3:30 pm	at Boston College	No. 23	Alumni Stadium; Chestnut Hill, MA	CBS	W 42–25	43,413	
October 31	12:00 pm	Pittsburgh	No. 17	Carrier Dome; Syracuse, NY (rivalry)	ESPN Plus	W 45–28	49,012	
November 7	7:30 pm	at West Virginia	No. 15	Mountaineer Field; Morgantown, WV (rivalry)	ESPN	L 28–35	54,655	
November 14	8:00 pm	No. 16 Virginia Tech		Carrier Dome; Syracuse, NY	ESPN2	W 28–26	49,336	
November 21	4:00 pm	at Temple	No. 24	Veterans Stadium; Philadelphia, PA		W 38–7	12,483	
November 28	3:30 pm	No. 19 Miami (FL)	No. 21	Carrier Dome; Syracuse, NY	CBS	W 66–13	49,521	
January 2	8:00 pm	vs. No. 7 Florida*	No. 18	Miami Orange Bowl; Miami, FL (Orange Bowl)	ABC	L 10–31	67,919	
*Non-conference game; Rankings from AP Poll released prior to the game; All times are in Eastern time

== Rankings ==
Ranking movements Legend: ██ Increase in ranking ██ Decrease in ranking — = Not ranked RV = Received votes т = Tied with team above or below
	Week															
Poll	Pre	1	2	3	4	5	6	7	8	9	10	11	12	13	14	Final
AP	17	19	13	12	11	24	23	21	17	15T	RV	24	21	18	18	25
Coaches Poll	14	18	13	13	11	24	22	22	19	17	25T	24	22	18	17	24
BCS	Not released								20	17	—	—	—	15	15	Not released

== Game summaries ==
=== At Michigan ===
#19 Syracuse Orangemen (0–1) at #13 Michigan Wolverines (0–1)

Quarter	1	2	3	4	Total
Syracuse	17	7	14	0	38
Michigan	0	7	0	21	28

at Michigan Stadium, Ann Arbor, Michigan

- Date: September 12, 1998
- Game time: 3:30 p.m.
- Game weather: Mostly sunny, high 80s
- Game attendance: 111,012
- TV: ABC
- Box Score

Team	Category	Player	Statistics
Syracuse	Passing	Donovan McNabb	21/27, 233 Yds, 3 TD
Syracuse	Rushing	Donovan McNabb	19 Rush, 60 Yds, TD
Syracuse	Receiving	Kevin Johnson	6 Rec, 78 Yds, TD
Michigan	Passing	Tom Brady	13/24, 104 Yds, TD, INT
Michigan	Rushing	Walter Cross	10 Rush, 104 Yds, 2 TD
Michigan	Receiving	Tai Streets	5 Rec, 53 Yds, TD

Scoring summary

Quarter	Time	Drive			Team	Scoring information	Score	
Quarter	Time	Plays	Yards	TOP	Team	Scoring information	SYR	UM
1	10:04	11	78	4:56	Syracuse	Kevin Johnson 6-yard touchdown run, Nathan Trout kick good	7	0
1	8:28	3	31	0:45	Syracuse	Rob Konrad 26-yard touchdown reception from Donovan McNabb, Nathan Trout kick good	14	0
1	5:19	6	44	1:36	Syracuse	33-yard field goal by Nathan Trout	17	0
2	5:36	14	86	7:06	Syracuse	Donovan McNabb 17-yard touchdown run, Nathan Trout kick good	24	0
2	0:46	5	39	0:28	Michigan	Tai Streets 4-yard touchdown reception from Tom Brady, Jay Feely kick good	24	7
3	5:27	11	59	4:38	Syracuse	Kevin Johnson 9-yard touchdown reception from Donovan McNabb, Nathan Trout kick good	31	7
3	1:47	5	52	2:10	Syracuse	Rob Konrad 9-yard touchdown reception from Donovan McNabb, Nathan Trout kick good	38	7
4	6:56	6	78	2:46	Michigan	Walter Cross 1-yard touchdown run, Jay Feely kick good	38	14
4	0:55	5	50	0:36	Michigan	Walter Cross 5-yard touchdown run, Jay Feely kick good	38	21
4	0:03	9	48	0:52	Michigan	Marcus Knight 16-yard touchdown reception from Drew Henson, Jay Feely kick good	38	28
"TOP" = time of possession. For other American football terms, see Glossary of American football.							38	28

== Roster ==
1998 Syracuse Orange football team roster
Players
Coaches
Offense

Pos.	#	Name	Class
OL	59	Mark Baniewicz	Jr
RB	6	Dee Brown	So
WR	12	Kevin Johnson	Sr
RB	32	Kyle Johnson	So
OL	73	Erik Kaloyanides	Fr
WR	85	Sean Kennedy	Fr
OL	61	Scott Kiernan	Sr
OL	62	Emerson Kilgore	So
FB	44	Rob Konrad	Sr
RB	28	Kyle McIntosh	Sr
QB	5	Donovan McNabb	Sr
RB	23	James Mungro	RFr

Defense

Pos.	#	Name	Class
DB	25	Will Allen	So
LB	33	Keith Bulluck	Jr
DB	37	Charles Burton	Fr
DE	54	Dwight Freeney	Fr
LB	50	Tim Glisker	Jr
LB	52	Morlon Greenwood	So

Special teams

Pos.	#	Name	Class
K		Nathan Trout

Head coach

- Paul Pasqualoni

Coordinators/assistant coaches

Legend

- (C) Team captain
- (S) Suspended
- (I) Ineligible
- Injured
- Redshirt

Roster
Last update: 1999-02-18
