= 1998 Rutgers Scarlet Knights football team =

American college football season

1998 Rutgers Scarlet Knights football
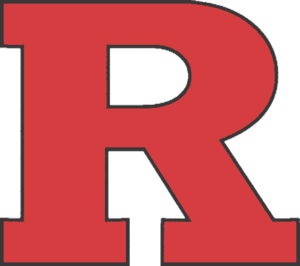
- Conference: Big East Conference
- Record: 5–6 (2–5 Big East)
- Head coach: Terry Shea (3rd season)
- Offensive coordinator: Terry Shea (3rd season)
- Defensive coordinator: Dennis Creehan (1st season)
- MVP: Reggie Stephens
- Captains: Aaron Brady; Bill Powell
- Home stadium: Rutgers Stadium

1998 Big East Conference football standings
	Conf.			Overall
Team	W		L	W		L
No. 25 Syracuse $	6	–	1	8	–	4
No. 20 Miami (FL)	5	–	2	9	–	3
No. 23 Virginia Tech	5	–	2	9	–	3
West Virginia	5	–	2	8	–	4
Boston College	3	–	4	4	–	7
Rutgers	2	–	5	5	–	6
Temple	2	–	5	2	–	9
Pittsburgh	0	–	7	2	–	9
$ – BCS representative as conference champion; Rankings from AP Poll

The 1998 Rutgers Scarlet Knights football team represented Rutgers University in the 1998 NCAA Division I-A football season. In their third season under head coach Terry Shea, the Scarlet Knights compiled a 5–6 record, were outscored by opponents 376 to 206, and finished in sixth place in the Big East Conference. The team's statistical leaders included Mike McMahon with 2,203 passing yards, Jacki Crooks with 821 rushing yards, and Bill Powell with 730 receiving yards.

== Schedule ==
Date	Opponent	Site	TV	Result	Attendance
September 5	Richmond*	Rutgers Stadium; Piscataway, New Jersey		W 7–6	
September 12	at Boston College	Alumni Stadium; Chestnut Hill, MA	ESPN Plus	L 14–41	38,287
September 19	at No. 13 Syracuse	Carrier Dome; Syracuse, NY	ESPN Plus	L 14–70	42,716
September 26	Army*	Rutgers Stadium; Piscataway, NJ		W 27–15	
October 3	Miami (FL)	Rutgers Stadium; Piscataway, NJ	ESPN Plus	L 17–53	21,419
October 17	at Pittsburgh	Pitt Stadium; Pittsburgh, PA	ESPN Plus	W 25–21	31,176
October 24	No. 22 Tulane*	Rutgers Stadium; Piscataway, NJ		L 24–52	20,714
October 31	Temple	Rutgers Stadium; Piscataway, NJ		W 21–10	
November 7	at Navy*	Navy–Marine Corps Memorial Stadium; Annapolis, MD		W 36–33	
November 14	West Virginia	Rutgers Stadium; Piscataway, NJ	BEN	L 14–28	26,740
November 21	at No. 23 Virginia Tech	Lane Stadium; Blacksburg, VA		L 7–47	42,452
*Non-conference game; Rankings from AP Poll released prior to the game

== Roster ==
1998 Rutgers Scarlet Knights football team roster
Players
Coaches
Offense

Pos.	#	Name	Class
QB	12	Mike Jones	Jr
QB	17	Mike McMahon	So
OL	63	Mike DeLucia	Jr
C	66	Shaun O'Hara	Jr
WR	86	Walter King	Jr

Defense

Pos.	#	Name	Class
LB	11	Aaron Brady	Sr

Special teams

Pos.	#	Name	Class

Head coach

- Terry Shea

Coordinators/assistant coaches

Legend

- (C) Team captain
- (S) Suspended
- (I) Ineligible
- Injured
- Redshirt
