= Mike Cloud =

American football player (born 1975)

No. 34, 21, 30
- Position: Running back

Personal information
- Born: July 1, 1975 (age 51); Charleston, South Carolina, U.S.
- Listed height: 5 ft 10 in (1.78 m)
- Listed weight: 205 lb (93 kg)

Career information
- High school: Portsmouth (Portsmouth, Rhode Island)
- College: Boston College
- NFL draft: 1999: 2nd round, 54th overall pick

Career history
- Kansas City Chiefs (1999–2002); New England Patriots (2003); New York Giants (2004); New England Patriots (2005); New York Giants (2005)

Awards and highlights
- Super Bowl champion (XXXVIII); Consensus All-American (1998)

Career NFL statistics
- Rushing attempts: 193
- Rushing yards: 648
- Receptions: 13
- Receiving yards: 100
- Touchdowns: 12
- Kick return yards: 1,209
- Stats at Pro Football Reference

Michael Alexander Cloud (born July 1, 1975) is an American former professional football player who was a running back in the National Football League (NFL) for seven seasons. He played college football for the Boston College Eagles, earning consensus All-American honors. A second-round pick in the 1999 NFL draft, he has played professionally for the Kansas City Chiefs, New England Patriots, and New York Giants of the NFL.

== Early life ==
Cloud was born in Charleston, South Carolina, and moved to Rhode Island at age five. He attended Portsmouth High School in Portsmouth, Rhode Island, and played both offense (running back) and defense (linebacker and cornerback) in high school football.

== College career ==
Cloud attended Boston College, where he played for the Boston College Eagles football team from 1995 to 1998. During his four years as an Eagle, he rushed for a team career record of 3,597 yards in 45 games. He rushed for 886 yards on 137 carries and eight touchdowns in 1997. As a senior in 1998, he ran for 1,726 yards on 308 carries, scored 14 touchdowns, and was recognized a consensus first-team All-American.

== Professional career ==
Cloud was selected by the Kansas City Chiefs in the second round of the 1999 NFL draft, and was the 54th overall choice. He played four seasons with the Chiefs, appearing in 56 of their 64 games but only starting six. He gained 128 yards in the 1999 season, his career high. Late in the 2002 season, Cloud tested positive for nandrolone use and was suspended for the first four games of the 2003 season. He later sued MuscleTech after claiming that one of their over-the-counter supplements, Nitro-Tech, caused the positive test. Cloud spent 2003 with the Patriots in a reserve role. He scored five rushing TDs in the 2003 season, two apiece against the Tennessee Titans and Indianapolis Colts and one against the New York Giants. He was on the roster for the postseason including the Super Bowl XXXVIII win, but was inactive. He went to the Giants for the 2004 season, but was released before the 2005 season began, and signed with New England as a free agent on November 5 due to the injuries to Corey Dillon and Kevin Faulk.
