= 1998 West Virginia Mountaineers football team =

American college football season

1998 West Virginia Mountaineers football

Insight.com Bowl, L 31–34 vs. Missouri
- Conference: Big East Conference
- Record: 8–4 (5–2 Big East)
- Head coach: Don Nehlen (19th season)
- Offensive coordinator: Dan Simrell (4th season)
- Defensive coordinator: Steve Dunlap (7th season)
- Home stadium: Mountaineer Field

1998 Big East Conference football standings
	Conf.			Overall
Team	W		L	W		L
No. 25 Syracuse $	6	–	1	8	–	4
No. 20 Miami (FL)	5	–	2	9	–	3
No. 23 Virginia Tech	5	–	2	9	–	3
West Virginia	5	–	2	8	–	4
Boston College	3	–	4	4	–	7
Rutgers	2	–	5	5	–	6
Temple	2	–	5	2	–	9
Pittsburgh	0	–	7	2	–	9
$ – BCS representative as conference champion; Rankings from AP Poll

The 1998 West Virginia Mountaineers football team represented West Virginia University as a member of the Big East Conference during the 1998 NCAA Division I-A football season. Led by 19th-year head coach Don Nehlen, the Mountaineers compiled an overall record of 8–4 with a mark of 5–2 in conference play, placing in a three-way tie for second in the Big East. West Virginia was invited to the Insight.com Bowl, where the Mountaineers lost to Missouri. The team played home games at Mountaineer Field in Morgantown, West Virginia.

== Schedule ==
Date	Time	Opponent	Rank	Site	TV	Result	Attendance	Source
September 5	7:00 p.m.	No. 1 Ohio State*	No. 11	Mountaineer Field; Morgantown, WV	CBS	L 17–34	68,409	
September 19	6:00 p.m.	Maryland*	No. 19	Mountaineer Field; Morgantown, WV (rivalry)	ESPN2	W 42–20	52,279	
September 26	12:00 p.m.	Tulsa*	No. 19	Mountaineer Field; Morgantown, WV	MSN	W 44–21	48,819	
October 3	12:00 p.m.	at Navy*	No. 16	Navy–Marine Corps Memorial Stadium; Annapolis, MD	FSN	W 45–24	36,009	
October 10	12:00 p.m.	at Temple	No. 16	Veterans Stadium; Philadelphia, PA	ESPN Plus	W 37–7	14,851	
October 24	3:30 p.m.	Miami (FL)	No. 13	Mountaineer Field; Morgantown, WV	CBS	L 31–34	60,081	
October 31	12:00 p.m.	at No. 20 Virginia Tech	No. 21	Lane Stadium; Blacksburg, VA (rivalry)	ESPN Plus	L 13–27	52,807	
November 7	7:30 p.m.	No. 15 Syracuse		Mountaineer Field; Morgantown, WV (rivalry)	ESPN	W 35–28	54,655	
November 14	12:00 p.m.	at Rutgers		Rutgers Stadium; Piscataway, NJ	ESPN Plus	W 28–14	26,740	
November 21	12:00 p.m.	Boston College		Mountaineer Field; Morgantown, WV	ESPN	W 35–10	40,573	
November 27	2:30 p.m.	at Pittsburgh		Three Rivers Stadium; Pittsburgh, PA (Backyard Brawl)	CBS	W 52–14	42,254	
December 26	8:00 p.m.	vs. No. 23 Missouri*		Arizona Stadium; Tucson, AZ (Insight.com Bowl)	ESPN	L 31–34	36,147	
*Non-conference game; Rankings from AP Poll released prior to the game; All times are in Eastern time

== Rankings ==
Ranking movements Legend: ██ Increase in ranking ██ Decrease in ranking — = Not ranked RV = Received votes т = Tied with team above or below
	Week															
Poll	Pre	1	2	3	4	5	6	7	8	9	10	11	12	13	14	Final
AP	11	20	19	19	16	16	15	13	21	—	—	RV	—	—	—	RV
Coaches Poll	12	20	20	20	17T	17	15	14	20	RV	RV	RV	RV	25	25	RV
BCS	Not released								—	—	—	—	—	—	—	Not released

== Personnel ==
1998 West Virginia Mountaineers football team roster
Players
Coaches
Offense

Pos.	#	Name	Class
WR	2	Jerry Porter	Jr
QB	4	Marc Bulger	Jr
WR	8	Khori Ivy	Jr
RB	20	Amos Zereoue	Jr
FB	34	Corey McIntyre	So
WR	35	David Lightcap	Sr
TE	36	Jeremy Knapp	Fr
RB	40	Wes Ours	So
OT	77	Solomon Page	Jr
TE	82	Anthony Becht	Jr

Defense

Pos.	#	Name	Class
DB	4	Charles Fisher	Sr
DB	22	Richard Bryant	So
DB	23	Scooter Davis	Sr
LB	33	Barrett Green	Jr
LB	41	Chris Edmonds	So
LB	43	Ryan Brady	Jr
LB	50	Jon Yura	Fr
DE	55	Gary Stills	Sr
DT	87	Antwan Lake	So
NT	96	John Thornton	Sr
LB	98	Kevin Landolt	Sr

Special teams

Pos.	#	Name	Class
K	47	Jay Taylor	Jr

Head coach

- Don Nehlen

Coordinators/assistant coaches

Legend

- (C) Team captain
- (S) Suspended
- (I) Ineligible
- Injured
- Redshirt
