= Amos Zereoué =

Ivorian gridiron football player (born 1976)

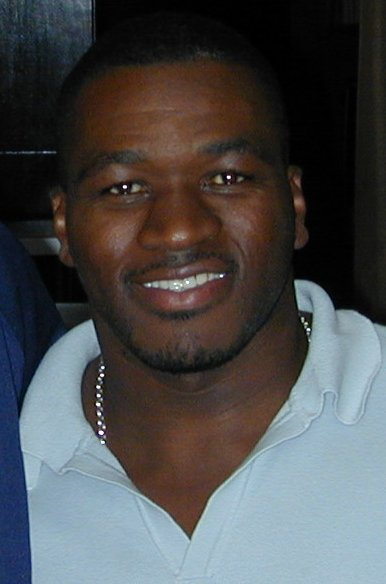
- Zereoue in 2008

No. 21, 28, 31
- Position: Running back

Personal information
- Born: October 8, 1976 (age 50); Ouragahio, Ivory Coast
- Listed height: 5 ft 8 in (1.73 m)
- Listed weight: 205 lb (93 kg)

Career information
- High school: Wellington C. Mepham (Bellmore, New York, U.S.)
- College: West Virginia (1996–1998)
- NFL draft: 1999: 3rd round, 95th overall pick

Career history
- Pittsburgh Steelers (1999–2003); Oakland Raiders (2004); New England Patriots (2005)

Awards and highlights
- 3× First-team All-Big East (1996–1998); Big East Rookie of the Year (1996); Third-team All-American (1997); Second-team All-American (1998); First-team All-ECAC (1997); WVU Sports Hall of Fame (2015)

Career NFL statistics
- Rushing yards: 2,137
- Rushing average: 3.9
- Rushing touchdowns: 10
- Receptions: 137
- Receiving yards: 1,111
- Receiving touchdowns: 1
- Stats at Pro Football Reference

Amos L. Zereoué (born October 8, 1976) is an American former professional football player who was a running back in the National Football League (NFL). He played college football for the West Virginia Mountaineers. He was selected by the Pittsburgh Steelers in the third round of the 1999 NFL draft. He also played for the Oakland Raiders and New England Patriots.

He owned and operated a restaurant in Manhattan, New York, called Zereoué. It has since closed.

== Early life ==
Zereoué was raised by a single father in Hempstead, New York; he lived in a group home called "Hope for Youth", in Bellmore, NY, during his high school years, owing to legal trouble in junior high school and the concerns of his father that the drugs and crime of the neighborhood he grew up in were undermining his ambition.

Zereoué attended Wellington C. Mepham High School in Bellmore, New York, and was a letterman in football. He set Long Island records of 5,360 yards and 59 touchdowns at Mepham, earning Street & Smith All-America recognition. He was also the first two-time Thorpe Award winner in high school, which recognizes the best player in Nassau County, an honor that surpassed local icons such as Jim Brown and Matt Snell.

== College career ==
=== Freshman (1996) ===
Zereoué was a late addition to the West Virginia roster in 1996, but made an immediate impact. On his first collegiate carry, he rushed the ball for a 69-yard touchdown against Pitt. In that same season, he finished the season with two of the school's five-best single-game rushing performances (234 yards against Notre Dame and 228 yards against Rutgers). He was unanimously voted the Big East Rookie of the Year after the season and was a First-team All-Big East selection. He also set a West Virginia freshman rushing record for a season with 1,035 rushing yards, which was later broken by his successor, Avon Cobourne (who broke Zereoué's career rushing records as well).

=== Sophomore (1997) ===
Zereoué was tenth in the 1997 Heisman Trophy race and was a Doak Walker Award semifinalist. He was a third-team All-American selection and was voted all-Big East and first-team All-ECAC selection as well. He also led the conference and set a school single-season rushing record with 1,589 yards on 281 carries. His 18 touchdowns on the season was one shy of the school record. He was ranked third on the season with 150 yards-per-game.

=== Junior (1998) ===
Zereoué was a Second-team All-American selection in 1998 by leading the team with 1,462 yards and 13 touchdowns on 283 carries. He was also ranked sixth in the nation with 143 yards-per-game in 1998.

During his college career, he rushed for over 100 yards 21 times, had seven straight games with over 100 yards rushing - averaging 123.8 yards-per-game during his career. At the time of leaving, he held the all-time school rushing yardage with 4,086 and held the record for the most yards in a season with 1,589 in 1997. Both records were broken by his successor at running back, Avon Cobourne. While at West Virginia Zereoué's nickname was "Famous Amos".

== Professional career ==
=== Pittsburgh Steelers (1999–2003) ===
Zereoué was selected in the third round, 95th overall of the 1999 NFL draft by the Pittsburgh Steelers, who had acquired future-Hall of Famer Jerome Bettis from the St. Louis Rams four years earlier in 1996. Zereoué got good playing time in his five seasons in Pittsburgh from 1999 to 2003. His best season came in 2002, when he rushed for a career-high 762 yards and four touchdowns. Also in 2002, he caught a career-high 42 receptions for 341 yards. In his years in Pittsburgh, he rushed for 1,698 yards and seven touchdowns.

=== Oakland Raiders (2004) ===
After the 2003 season, Zereoué was cut by the Steelers. He was then signed as a free-agent by the Oakland Raiders. Tyrone Wheatley ended up getting the starting job for 2004, but Zereoué saw time on the field as well. He rushed for 425 yards and three touchdowns in his one season in Oakland, before he was cut with the arrival of LaMont Jordan from the New York Jets.

=== New England Patriots (2005) ===
After being cut by the Raiders, Zereoué spent his final NFL season with the New England Patriots. He spent time playing backup to veteran Corey Dillon, but he only ran the ball seven times on the season for 14 yards. He then was cut by the Patriots as well, and eventually retired.

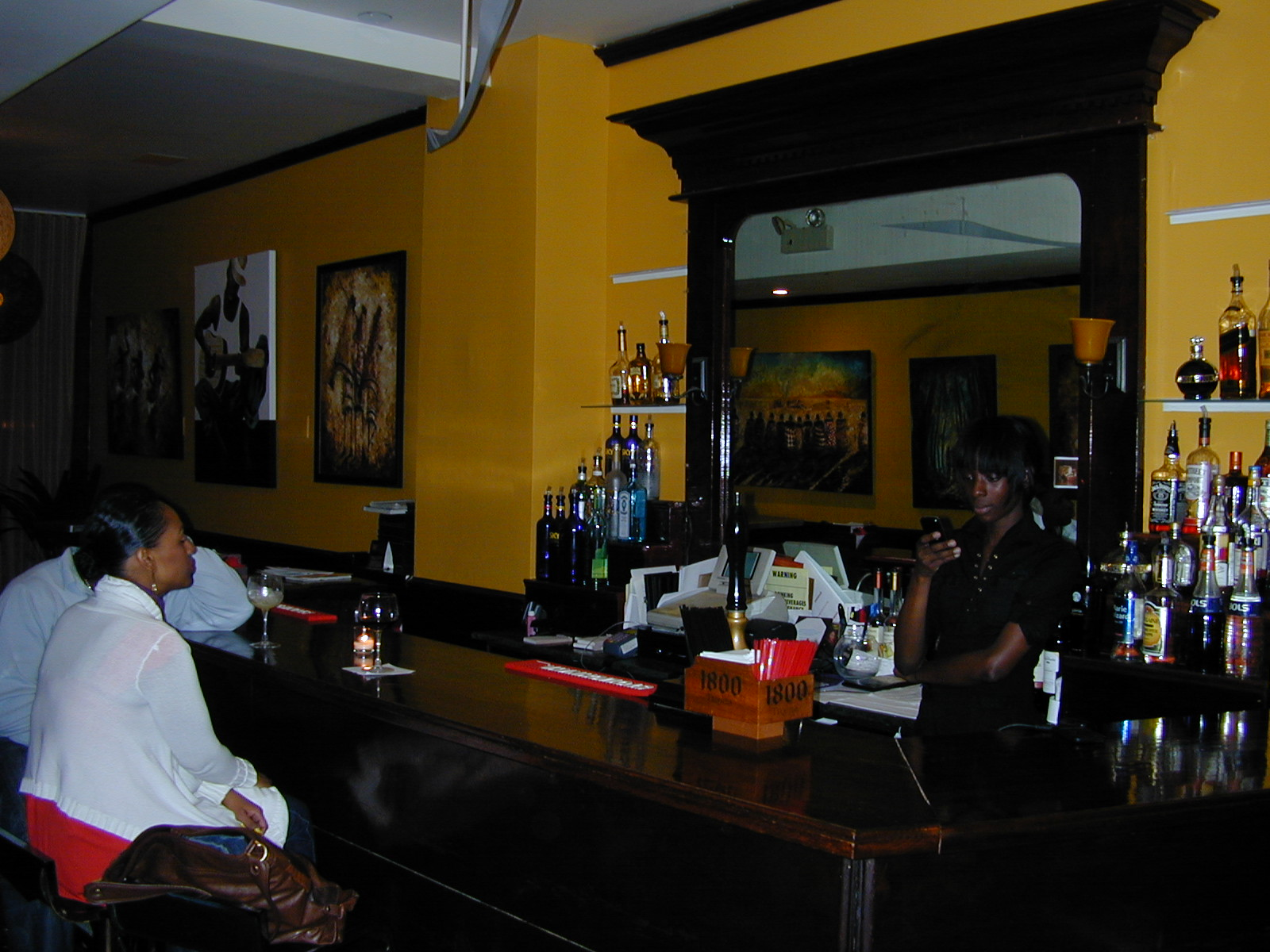
Zereoué restaurant interior, 2008.

In his seven-year career, Zereoué rushed for 2,137 yards with 10 touchdowns. He caught 137 receptions for 1,111 yards and a touchdown. He also had seven kick returns for 169 yards.

== Career statistics ==
=== NFL ===
Season				Rushing					Receiving					Fumbles		
Year	Team	GP	GS	Att	Yds	Avg	TD	Lng	Rec	Yds	Avg	Lng	TD	Fum	Lost	
1999	PIT	8	GS	0	18	48	2.7	0	8	2	17	8.5	14	0	0	0
2000	PIT	12	0	6	14	2.3	0	11	0	0	0	0	0	0	0	
2001	PIT	14	0	85	441	5.2	1	32	13	154	11.8	62	1	3	0	
2002	PIT	16	5	193	762	3.9	4	42	42	341	8.1	54	0	2	0	
2003	PIT	16	6	132	433	3.3	2	22	40	310	7.8	29	0	0	0	
2004	OAK	15	6	112	425	3.8	3	55	39	284	7.3	13	0	1	0	
2005	NE	3	0	7	14	2.0	0	12	1	5	5.0	5	0	0	0	
Career		84	17	553	2,137	3.9	10	55	137	1,111	8.1	62	1	6	0	

=== College ===
Season				Rushing					Receiving					Fumbles		
Year	Team	GP	GS	Att	Yds	Avg	TD	Lng	Rec	Yds	Avg	Lng	TD	Fum	Lost	
1996	WV	11	GS	--	222	1,035	4.7	9	--	16	59	3.7	--	1	--	--
1997	WV	11	--	281	1,589	5.6	18	--	16	131	8.2	--	0	--	--	
1998	WV	11	--	283	1,462	5.2	13	--	23	184	8.0	--	1	--	--	
Career		33	--	786	4,086	5.2	40	--	55	374	6.8	--	2	--	--	

== Post-football ==
Zereoué opened an African/French restaurant in Manhattan called Zereoué. The restaurant was located at 13 East 37th Street (between 5th and Madison) in New York City.

Zereoué also played for New York City amateur soccer club Central Park Rangers FC.
