= Charles Fisher (American football) =

American football player and coach (born 1976)

No. 25
- Position: Cornerback

Personal information
- Born: February 2, 1976 (age 50); Aliquippa, Pennsylvania, U.S.
- Listed height: 6 ft 0 in (1.83 m)
- Listed weight: 185 lb (84 kg)

Career information
- College: West Virginia
- NFL draft: 1999: 2nd round, 33rd overall pick

Career history

Playing
- Cincinnati Bengals (1999–2001)

Coaching
- Green Bay Packers (Coaching Intern) (2002); Seattle Seahawks (Scout) (2003–2009)

Awards and highlights
- Second-team All-Big East

Career NFL statistics
- Games started: 1
- Games played: 1
- Stats at Pro Football Reference

Charles Fisher (born February 2, 1976) is an American former professional football player who was a cornerback as well as a scout for the Seattle Seahawks of the National Football League (NFL). He played college football for the West Virginia Mountaineers and was selected by the Cincinnati Bengals in the second round of the 1999 NFL draft.

== College career ==
Fisher was named to the second-team All-Big East while at West Virginia and majored in sports management.

== Professional career ==
=== Cincinnati Bengals ===
Fisher was drafted by the Cincinnati Bengals in the second round (33rd overall) of the 1999 NFL draft. As a rookie in 1999, Fisher was considered the Bengals future at cornerback, winning one of two starting cornerback spots after Corey Sawyer was released. However, in week one of the 1999 NFL season, about 12 plays into the game, Fisher tore all three major ligaments in his knee, the MCL, ACL and PCL and missed the rest of the season. The injury occurred when Fisher was attempting to cover Tennessee Titans wide receiver Kevin Dyson. His injury left the Bengals thin at cornerback, having to start Artrell Hawkins and fellow rookie Rodney Heath. Following the injury, many media members claimed that Fisher's career was over. The injury would prove to never allow him to regain full health and he never played another game in the NFL. He was released by the Bengals in 2001.

== Coaching career ==
Following his release from the Bengals, Fisher was hired as a coaching intern in the player personnel department for the Green Bay Packers. On June 16, 2003, Fisher was hired by the Seattle Seahawks as a scout. Fisher was present at the Mountaineers 2008 pro day, and was impressed by former Mountaineers running back Steve Slaton and safety Ryan Mundy. Fisher left the team after the conclusion of the 2009 season.

Fisher now works as the Director of Business Development at Octagon Football.
