= 1998 Miami Hurricanes football team =

American college football season

1998 Miami Hurricanes football

Micron PC Bowl champion

Micron PC Bowl, W 46–23 vs. NC State
- Conference: Big East Conference

Ranking
- Coaches: No. 21
- AP: No. 20
- Record: 9–3 (5–2 Big East)
- Head coach: Butch Davis (4th season)
- Offensive coordinator: Larry Coker (4th season)
- Defensive coordinator: Bill Miller (4th season)
- MVP: Scott Covington
- Home stadium: Miami Orange Bowl

1998 Big East Conference football standings
	Conf.			Overall
Team	W		L	W		L
No. 25 Syracuse $	6	–	1	8	–	4
No. 20 Miami (FL)	5	–	2	9	–	3
No. 23 Virginia Tech	5	–	2	9	–	3
West Virginia	5	–	2	8	–	4
Boston College	3	–	4	4	–	7
Rutgers	2	–	5	5	–	6
Temple	2	–	5	2	–	9
Pittsburgh	0	–	7	2	–	9
$ – BCS representative as conference champion; Rankings from AP Poll

The 1998 Miami Hurricanes football team represented the University of Miami as a member of the Big East Conference during the 1998 NCAA Division I-A football season. Led by fourth-year head coach Butch Davis, the Hurricanes compiled an overall record of 9–3 with a mark of 5–2 in conference play, placing a in three-way tie for second in the Big East. Miami was invited to the Micron PC Bowl, where the Hurricanes defeated NC State. The team played home games at the Miami Orange Bowl in Miami.

== Schedule ==
Date	Time	Opponent	Rank	Site	TV	Result	Attendance	Source
September 5	7:30 pm	No. 11 (I-AA) East Tennessee State*		Miami Orange Bowl; Miami, FL		W 66–17	36,617	
September 12	3:30 pm	at Cincinnati*		Nippert Stadium; Cincinnati, OH	FSN	W 38–12	20,681	
September 19	8:00 pm	Virginia Tech		Miami Orange Bowl; Miami, FL (rivalry)	ESPN	L 20–27 ^{OT}	41,155	
October 3	12:00 pm	at Rutgers		Rutgers Stadium; Piscataway, NJ	ESPN Plus	W 53–17	21,419	
October 10	3:30 pm	No. 8 Florida State*		Miami Orange Bowl; Miami, FL (rivalry)	CBS	L 14–26	63,617	
October 24	3:30 pm	at No. 13 West Virginia		Mountaineer Field; Morgantown, WV	CBS	W 34–31	60,081	
October 31	6:00 pm	Boston College	No. 25	Miami Orange Bowl; Miami, FL	ESPN2	W 35–17	32,917	
November 14	4:00 pm	at Temple	No. 24	Veterans Stadium; Philadelphia, PA		W 42–7	18,734	
November 19	8:00 pm	Pittsburgh	No. 22	Miami Orange Bowl; Miami, FL	ESPN	W 38–10	38,084	
November 28	3:30 pm	at No. 21 Syracuse	No. 19	Carrier Dome; Syracuse, NY	CBS	L 13–66	49,521	
December 5	2:00 pm	No. 3 UCLA*		Miami Orange Bowl; Miami, FL (College GameDay)	ESPN	W 49–45	46,819	
December 29	7:30 pm	vs. NC State*	No. 24	Pro Player Stadium; Miami, FL (MicronPC Bowl)	TBS	W 46–23	44,387	
*Non-conference game; Rankings from AP Poll released prior to the game; All times are in Eastern time

== Roster ==
1998 Miami Hurricanes football team roster
Players
Coaches
Offense

Pos.	#	Name	Class
WR	1	Daryl Jones	So
RB	4	Najeh Davenport	Fr
RB	5	Edgerrin James	Jr
WR	6	Santana Moss	So
QB	11	Scott Covington	Sr
QB	15	Kenny Kelly	Fr
FB	18	Mondriel Fulcher	Jr
RB	21	James Jackson	So
G	62	Richard Mercier	Jr
G	65	Martin Bibla	Fr
OT	73	Joaquin Gonzalez	Fr
WR	84	Andre King	So
WR	87	Reggie Wayne	So
TE	88	Bubba Franks	So

Defense

Pos.	#	Name	Class
CB	8	Mike Rumph	Fr
FS	20	Ed Reed	Fr
CB	22	Leonard Myers	So
DB	23	James Lewis	Fr
DB	33	Jeff Popovich	Jr
LB	44	Dan Morgan	So
LB	48	Chris Campbell	Fr
LB	52	Nate Webster	So
DE	71	Derrick Ham	Sr
DT	92	Damione Lewis	So
DE	93	Michael Boireau	Jr
DE	94	William Joseph	Fr

Special teams

Pos.	#	Name	Class

Head coach

- Butch Davis

Coordinators/assistant coaches

Legend

- (C) Team captain
- (S) Suspended
- (I) Ineligible
- Injured
- Redshirt

Roster

== Rankings ==
Ranking movements Legend: ██ Increase in ranking ██ Decrease in ranking — = Not ranked RV = Received votes
	Week															
Poll	Pre	1	2	3	4	5	6	7	8	9	10	11	12	13	14	Final
AP	RV	RV	RV	RV	RV	RV	RV	RV	25	24	24	22	19	RV	24	20
Coaches	RV	RV	RV	RV	RV	RV	—	—	RV	RV	24	22	20	RV	RV	21
BCS	Not released								—	—	—	24	20	—	—	Not released
