= Rob Konrad =

American football player (born 1976)

No. 44
- Position: Fullback

Personal information
- Born: November 12, 1976 (age 50); Rochester, New York, U.S.
- Listed height: 6 ft 3 in (1.91 m)
- Listed weight: 255 lb (116 kg)

Career information
- College: Syracuse
- NFL draft: 1999: 2nd round, 43rd overall pick

Career history
- Miami Dolphins (1999–2004); Oakland Raiders (2005)*
- * Offseason or practice squad member only

Awards and highlights
- Syracuse Orange No. 44 retired

Career NFL statistics
- Rushing yards: 114
- Rushing average: 3.0
- Rushing touchdowns: 1
- Receptions: 111
- Receiving yards: 854
- Receiving touchdowns: 6
- Stats at Pro Football Reference

Robert Konrad (born November 12, 1976) is an American financial advisor and former football player who was a fullback for the Miami Dolphins of the National Football League (NFL). He attended Syracuse University, where he played college football for the Syracuse Orange. He was selected by the Dolphins in the second round of the 1999 NFL draft.

== Early life ==
Konrad attended St. John's Preparatory School in Danvers, Massachusetts, where he played for their high school football team.

== College career ==
Konrad enrolled at Syracuse University, where he played college football for the Syracuse Orange football team. He is the last Orange football player to wear the uniform number 44, as the number was retired during the 2005 season.

== Professional career ==
The Miami Dolphins selected Konrad in the second round, with the 43rd overall selection, of the 1999 NFL draft. He played for the Dolphins from 1999 through 2004. He went on to play for the Oakland Raiders during the 2005 preseason, and was released before the start of the regular season.

== Post-football career ==
Konrad is currently the CEO of Alterna Financial and also one of the managing directors of Alterna Equity Partners. He became a member of the Florida State Board of Administration's Investment Advisory Council in 2007.

Konrad is also founder, and non-executive chairman of Socius Family Office.

Konrad fell off of his boat while fishing alone in the Atlantic Ocean on January 7, 2015, and swam 9 miles (14 km) to safety. It took him 12 hours to swim to shore.
