= David Pugh (American football) =

American football player (born 1979)

No. 95
- Position: Defensive tackle

Personal information
- Born: July 24, 1979 (age 47); Madison Heights, Virginia, U.S.
- Listed height: 6 ft 2 in (1.88 m)
- Listed weight: 270 lb (122 kg)

Career information
- High school: Amherst County (Amherst, Virginia)
- College: Virginia Tech
- NFL draft: 2002: 6th round, 182nd overall pick

Career history
- Indianapolis Colts (2002–2003)
- Stats at Pro Football Reference

David Winston Pugh Jr. (born July 24, 1979) is an American former professional football defensive tackle who played for the Indianapolis Colts of the National Football League (NFL). He weighed 270 pounds and stood 6–2.

== Early life ==
Pugh played high school football at Amherst County High School. He was a 4 star defensive tackle out of high school with offers to play at these schools VT, UCLA, UVA, TENN, CLM, AUB, Penn ST, ND, and UGA.

== College career ==
Pugh played college football at Virginia Tech. He wore #71 while he played college football. Pugh had 41 TFL (Tackles for loss) and 13.5 sacks, 170 tackles with 95 solo, 3 forced fumbles and 1 fumble recovery with 1 Interception throughout his college career. He made all-bud team and was a two-time first-team All-Big East selection. He was ranked 21st in the 2002 Pre-Draft rankings, as ranked by draftcountdown.com. He was mentioned in the 2001 All-American Pre-Season Honors rankings.

== Professional career ==
Pugh was selected with the 10th pick (182nd overall) of the sixth round of the 2002 NFL draft by the Indianapolis Colts. As a rookie, he wore #95. He played four games, he started one, and had four total tackles. He did not play in the Indianapolis Colts post-season loss to the New York Jets.

Although he was with the Indianapolis Colts in 2003, he couldn’t play because of a knee injury.
