= Doug Brzezinski =

American football player (born 1976)

No. 74, 79
- Position: Offensive guard

Personal information
- Born: March 11, 1976 (age 50); Livonia, Michigan, U.S.
- Listed height: 6 ft 4 in (1.93 m)
- Listed weight: 305 lb (138 kg)

Career information
- High school: Detroit Catholic Central (Novi, Michigan)
- College: Boston College
- NFL draft: 1999: 3rd round, 64th overall pick

Career history
- Philadelphia Eagles (1999–2002); Carolina Panthers (2003–2004)

Awards and highlights
- NFL All-Rookie Team (1999)

Career NFL statistics
- Games played: 73
- Games started: 30
- Stats at Pro Football Reference

Douglas Gregory Brzezinski (born March 11, 1976) is an American former professional football player who was an offensive guard in the National Football League (NFL) for the Philadelphia Eagles and the Carolina Panthers. He played college football at Boston College and was selected in the third round of the 1999 NFL draft.

Pre-draft measurables
Height	Weight	40-yard dash	10-yard split	20-yard split	20-yard shuttle	Vertical jump	Broad jump	Bench press
6 ft 4 in (1.93 m)	309 lb (140 kg)	5.32 s	1.87 s	3.09 s	4.53 s	26.0 in (0.66 m)	8 ft 2 in (2.49 m)	26 reps
All values from NFL Combine

Brzezinski began his football career as an offensive lineman for Detroit Catholic Central High School, he has been inducted into Catholic Central's athletic hall of fame for this.
