= 2000 Seattle Seahawks season =

American football team season

- Owner: Paul Allen
- General manager: Mike Holmgren
- Head coach: Mike Holmgren
- Home stadium: Husky Stadium

Results
- Record: 6–10
- Division place: 4th AFC West
- Playoffs: Did not qualify
- All-Pros: None
- Pro Bowlers: None

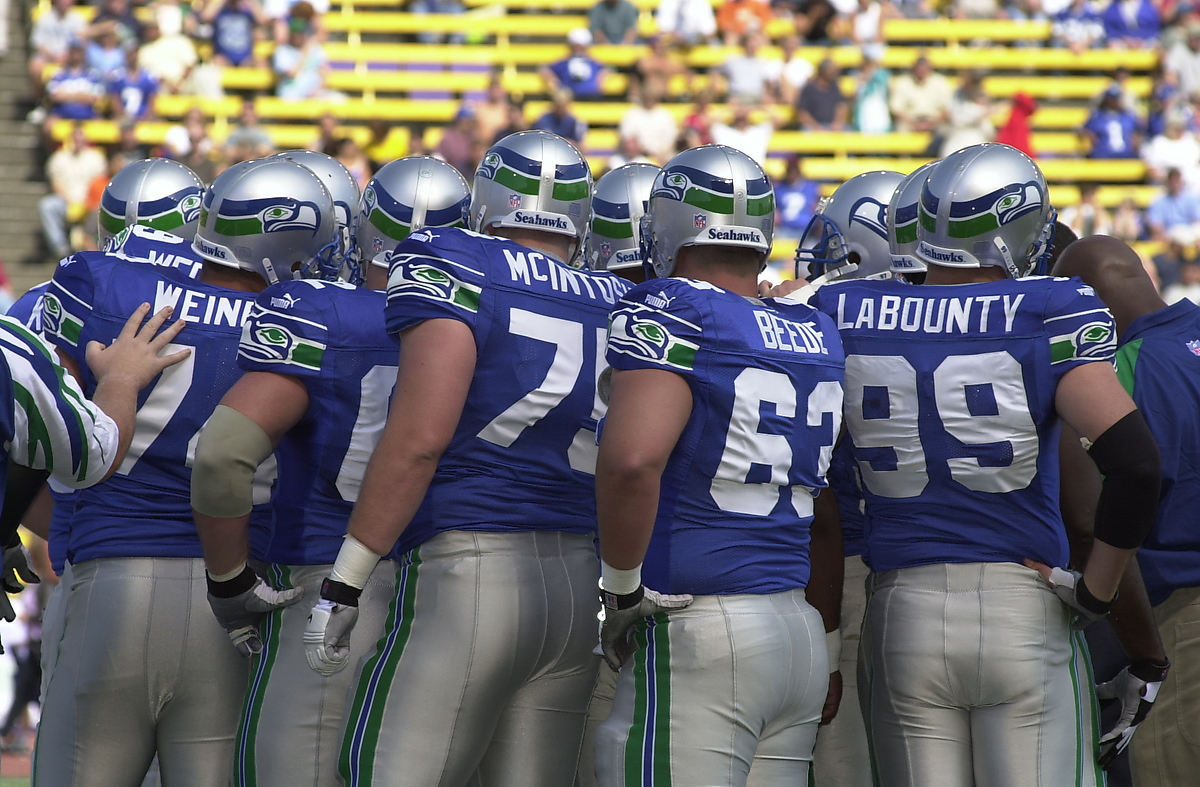
Seahawks players in 2000

The 2000 Seattle Seahawks season was the franchise's 25th season in the National Football League (NFL), the first of two seasons the Seahawks played at Husky Stadium while Seahawks Stadium was being built and the second under head coach Mike Holmgren. The 2000 Seahawks' pass defense surrendered 7.63 yards-per-attempt (including quarterback sacks), one of the ten-worst totals in the history of the NFL. They failed to improve on their 9–7 record or defend their AFC West title from 1999. On a positive note, the Seahawks defeated the Raiders who would go on to make the AFC Championship game.

== Offseason ==
Additions	Subtractions
C Robbie Tobeck (Falcons)	WR Joey Galloway (Cowboys)
LB George Koonce (Packers)	S Darryl Williams (Bengals)
CB Fred Vinson (Packers)	RB Ahman Green (Packers)
S Reggie Tongue (Chiefs)	DE Phillip Daniels (Bears)
	DT Sam Adams (Ravens)
	S Brian Walker (Dolphins)
	LB Darrin Smith (Saints)
	CB Fred Thomas (Saints)
	K Todd Peterson (Chiefs)

=== NFL draft ===
2000 Seattle Seahawks draft
Round	Pick	Player	Position	College	Notes
1	19	Shaun Alexander *	Running back	Alabama	from Dallas (Note: No. 19: Dallas → Seattle (PD). Dallas traded this selection and their 2001 First Round Pick (7th) to Seattle for Joey Galloway.)
1	22	Chris McIntosh	Offensive tackle	Wisconsin	
2	52	Ike Charlton	Cornerback	Virginia Tech	
3	80	Darrell Jackson	Wide receiver	Florida	from Dallas
4	116	Marcus Bell	Linebacker	Arizona	
4	119	Isaiah Kacyvenski	Linebacker	Harvard	from San Francisco
6	175	James Williams	Wide receiver	Marshall	from Denver
6	185	Tim Watson	Defensive tackle	Rowan	from Green Bay
6	190	John Hillard	Defensive tackle	Mississippi State	
Made roster † Pro Football Hall of Fame * Made at least one Pro Bowl during career

=== Undrafted free agents ===
2000 undrafted free agents of note
Player	Position	College
Tim Conley	Tackle	Sacramento State
Dwan Epps	Linebacker	Texas Southern
Kevin Fetenk	Quarterback	BYU
Rickey Garrett	Wide receiver	Illinois State
Anthony Green	Fullback	West Virginia
Kris Heppner	Kicker	Montana
Alan Jones	Cornerback	Wyoming
Donta Kendrick	Guard	USC
Scot Osborne	Long Snapper	William & Mary
Rodnick Phillips	Running back	SMU
Carlos Timmons	Linebacker	Eastern Kentucky

== Personnel ==
=== Staff ===
2000 Seattle Seahawks staff
**Front office**: Chairman – Paul Allen; President – Bob Whitsitt; Senior vice president – Mike Reinfeldt; Vice president of football operations – Ted Thompson; Director of player personnel – John Schneider; Director of pro personnel – Will Lewis; Director of college scouting – Scot McCloughan; Assistant to the general manager – Gary Reynolds; Pro personnel assistant – John Jamison; Administrative assistant/football operations/travel – Bill Nayes; **Head coaches**: Executive vice president of football operations/general manager/head coach – Mike Holmgren; Assistant head coach/offensive line – Tom Lovat; **Offensive coaches**: Offensive coordinator – Gil Haskell; Quarterbacks – Mike Sheppard; Running backs – Stump Mitchell; Wide receivers – Nolan Cromwell; Tight ends – Jim Lind; Offensive quality control – Jerry Colquitt	**Defensive coaches**: Defensive coordinator – Steve Sidwell; Defensive line – Larry Brooks; Linebackers – Ken Flajole; Defensive backs – Dick Roach; Defensive quality control – Clayton Lopez; **Special teams coaches**: Special teams coordinator – Pete Rodriguez; Assistant special teams/strength and conditioning – Johnny Holland; **Strength and conditioning**: Strength and conditioning – Kent Johnston; Assistant strength and conditioning – Rod Springer

=== Final roster ===
2000 Seattle Seahawks roster
**Quarterbacks (QB)**: 5 Travis Brown; 11 Brock Huard; **7** Jon Kitna; **Running backs (RB)**: 37 Shaun Alexander; 34 Reggie Brown FB; 31 Charlie Rogers; **38** Mack Strong FB; **32** Ricky Watters; **Wide receivers (WR)**: 83 Karsten Bailey; 19 Fabien Bownes; **81** Sean Dawkins; **82** Darrell Jackson; **87** Derrick Mayes; 88 James Williams; **Tight ends (TE)**: **86** Christian Fauria; 85 James Hill; 89 Itula Mili	**Offensive linemen (OL)**: 63 Frank Beede G; **62** Chris Gray C; **71** Walter Jones T; **66** Pete Kendall G; **75** Chris McIntosh T; 79 Chad Overhauser T; 61 Robbie Tobeck C; **69** Floyd Wedderburn G; 74 Todd Weiner T; **Defensive linemen (DL)**: 90 Antonio Cochran DE; 95 John Hilliard DT; **96** Cortez Kennedy DT; **92** Lamar King DE; 99 Matt LaBounty DE; **97** Riddick Parker DT; **70** Michael Sinclair DE; 93 Rahmaan Streater DE; 98 Cedric Woodard DT	**Linebackers (LB)**: 55 Marcus Bell OLB; **94** Chad Brown OLB; 58 Isaiah Kacyvenski MLB; **53** George Koonce MLB; 56 James Logan OLB; **51** Anthony Simmons OLB; 59 Tim Terry OLB; **Defensive backs (DB)**: **20** Jay Bellamy FS; 23 Ike Charlton CB; **28** Kerry Joseph SS; 33 Maurice Kelly FS; 22 Paul Miranda CB; **24** Shawn Springs CB; 25 Reggie Tongue SS; **27** Willie Williams CB; **Special teams (ST)**: 52 J. P. Darche LS; 10 Jeff Feagles P; 9 Rian Lindell K	**Practice squad**: 16 Dwaune Jones WR; 65 Eric King G; 48 Scot Osborne TE; 30 Jermaine Smith CB; **Reserve**: 46 Dwan Epps LB (IR); 84 Rufus French TE (IR); 50 DeShone Myles LB (IR); 21 Fred Vinson CB (IR); 91 Tim Watson DT (IR); Rookies in italics 53 active, 5 reserve, 4 practice squad

- Starters in bold.

== Schedule ==
=== Preseason ===
Divisional matchups have the AFC West playing the NFC West.

Week	Date	Opponent	Result	Record	Game site	Recap
1	August 5	Indianapolis Colts	**W** 28–16	1–0	Husky Stadium	Recap
2	August 12	at Arizona Cardinals	**L** 3–21	1–1	Sun Devil Stadium	Recap
3	August 19	San Francisco 49ers	**W** 25–21	2–1	Husky Stadium	Recap
4	August 24	at Oakland Raiders	**L** 0–20	2–2	Network Associates Coliseum	Recap

Source: Seahawks Media Guides

=== Regular season ===
Divisional matchups have the AFC West playing the NFC West.

Week	Date	Opponent	Result	Record	Game site	Recap
1	September 3	at Miami Dolphins	**L** 0–23	0–1	Pro Player Stadium	Recap
2	September 10	St. Louis Rams	**L** 34–37	0–2	Husky Stadium	Recap
3	September 17	New Orleans Saints	**W** 20–10	1–2	Husky Stadium	Recap
4	September 24	at **San Diego Chargers**	**W** 20–12	2–2	Qualcomm Stadium	Recap
5	October 2	at **Kansas City Chiefs**	**L** 17–24	2–3	Arrowhead Stadium	Recap
6	October 8	at Carolina Panthers	**L** 3–26	2–4	Ericsson Stadium	Recap
7	October 15	Indianapolis Colts	**L** 24–37	2–5	Husky Stadium	Recap
8	October 22	at **Oakland Raiders**	**L** 3–31	2–6	Network Associates Coliseum	Recap
9	October 29	**Kansas City Chiefs**	**L** 19–24	2–7	Husky Stadium	Recap
10	November 5	**San Diego Chargers**	**W** 17–15	3–7	Husky Stadium	Recap
11	November 12	at Jacksonville Jaguars	**W** 28–21	4–7	Alltel Stadium	Recap
12	Bye					
13	November 26	**Denver Broncos**	**L** 31–38	4–8	Husky Stadium	Recap
14	December 3	at Atlanta Falcons	**W** 30–10	5–8	Georgia Dome	Recap
15	December 10	at **Denver Broncos**	**L** 24–31	5–9	Mile High Stadium	Recap
16	December 16	**Oakland Raiders**	**W** 27–24	6–9	Husky Stadium	Recap
17	December 23	Buffalo Bills	**L** 23–42	6–10	Husky Stadium	Recap
Note: Intra-division opponents are in **bold** text.

Source: 2000 NFL season results

== Standings ==
AFC West
	W	L	T	PCT	PF	PA	STK
^{(2)} Oakland Raiders	12	4	0	.750	479	299	W1
^{(5)} Denver Broncos	11	5	0	.688	485	369	W1
Kansas City Chiefs	7	9	0	.438	355	354	L1
Seattle Seahawks	6	10	0	.375	320	405	L1
San Diego Chargers	1	15	0	.063	269	440	L4

== Game summaries ==
=== Preseason ===
==== Week P1: vs. Indianapolis Colts ====
Preseason Week One: Seattle Seahawks vs. Indianapolis Colts – Game summary

Quarter	1	2	3	4	Total
Colts	0	7	3	6	16
Seahawks	0	7	14	7	28

at Husky Stadium, Seattle

- Date: August 5
- Game time: 5:06 pm local
- Game weather: clear, 80 °F (27 °C), 50% humidity, wind SE 5 miles per hour (8.0 km/h)
- Game attendance: 68,578
- Referee: Tony Corrente
- TV: KING
- Gamebook

==== Week P2: at Arizona Cardinals ====
Preseason Week Two: Seattle Seahawks at Arizona Cardinals – Game summary

Quarter	1	2	3	4	Total
Seahawks	0	0	0	3	3
Cardinals	7	7	7	0	21

at Sun Devil Stadium, Tempe, Arizona

- Date: August 12
- Game time: 7:06 pm local
- Game weather: cloudy, 97 °F (36 °C), 33% humidity, wind NW 9 miles per hour (14 km/h)
- Game attendance: 34,774
- Referee: Dick Hantak
- TV: KING
- Gamebook

==== Week P3: vs. San Francisco 49ers ====
Preseason Week Three: Seattle Seahawks vs. San Francisco 49ers – Game summary

Quarter	1	2	3	4	Total
49ers	7	14	0	0	21
Seahawks	10	8	0	7	25

at Husky Stadium, Seattle

- Date: August 19
- Game time: 8:00 pm local
- Game weather: partly cloudy, 66 °F (19 °C), 50% humidity, wind SW 13 miles per hour (21 km/h)
- Game attendance: 68,579
- Referee: Mike Carey
- TV: KING
- Gamebook

==== Week P4: at Oakland Raiders ====
Preseason Week Four: Seattle Seahawks at Oakland Raiders – Game summary

Quarter	1	2	3	4	Total
Seahawks	0	0	0	0	0
Raiders	3	14	3	0	20

at Network Associates Coliseum, Oakland, California

- Date: August 24
- Game time: 6:00 pm local
- Game weather: clear, 73 °F (23 °C), 49% humidity, wind W 12 miles per hour (19 km/h)
- Game attendance: 32,012
- Referee: Phil Luckett
- TV: KING
- Gamebook

=== Regular season ===
==== Week 1: at Miami Dolphins ====
Week One: Seattle Seahawks at Miami Dolphins – Game summary

Quarter	1	2	3	4	Total
Seahawks	0	0	0	0	0
Dolphins	10	13	0	0	23

at Pro Player Stadium, Miami

- Date: September 3
- Game time: 4:16 pm local
- Game weather: clear, 89 °F (32 °C), 59% humidity, wind E 13 miles per hour (21 km/h)
- Game attendance: 72,949
- Referee: Ron Winter
- TV announcers (CBS): Kevin Harlan, Todd Blackledge
- Gamebook

Game information

First quarter

- MIA – Lamar Smith 4-yard run (Olindo Mare kick), 7:43 (MIA 7–0)
- MIA – Olindo Mare 48-yard field goal, 1:22 (MIA 10–0)

Second quarter

- MIA – Olindo Mare 25-yard field goal, 13:54 (MIA 13–0)
- MIA – Olindo Mare 30-yard field goal, 10:51 (MIA 16–0)
- MIA – Oronde Gadsden 16-yard pass from Jay Fiedler (Olindo Mare kick), 0:43 (MIA 23–0)

Third quarter

- No scoring plays

Fourth quarter

- No scoring plays

Top passers

- SEA – Jon Kitna: 6/15, 54 yds, 4 INT
- MIA – Jay Fiedler: 15/24, 134 yds, 1 TD

Top rushers

- SEA – Ricky Watters: 11 car, 59 yds
- MIA – Lamar Smith: 27 car, 145 yds, 1 TD

Top receivers

- SEA – Ricky Watters: 3 rec, 32 yds
- MIA – Leslie Shepherd: 3 rec, 30 yds

Team – pass – rush – total – to

- SEA – 72 – 71 – 143 – 6
- MIA – 127 – 181 – 308 – 1

==== Week 2: vs. St. Louis Rams ====
Week Two: Seattle Seahawks vs. St. Louis Rams – Game summary

Quarter	1	2	3	4	Total
Rams	3	10	7	17	37
Seahawks	3	7	10	14	34

at Husky Stadium, Seattle

- Date: September 10
- Game time: 1:15 pm local
- Game weather: overcast, 55 °F (13 °C), 100% humidity, wind W 3 miles per hour (4.8 km/h)
- Game attendance: 64,869
- Referee: Larry Nemmers
- TV announcers (Fox): Pat Summerall, John Madden, and D.J. Johnson
- Gamebook

Game information

First quarter

- SEA – Kris Heppner 19-yard field goal, 6:00 (SEA 3–0)
- STL – Jeff Wilkins 48-yard field goal, 0:32 (Tied 3–3)

Second quarter

- SEA – Jay Bellamy 84-yard interception return (Kris Heppner kick), 6:58 (SEA 10–3)
- STL – Jeff Wilkins 48-yard field goal, 3:11 (SEA 10–6)
- STL – Robert Holcombe 1-yard run (Jeff Wilkins kick), 0:17 (STL 13–10)

Third quarter

- SEA – Ricky Watters 3-yard run (Kris Heppner kick), 9:56 (SEA 17–13)
- STL – Marshall Faulk 1-yard run (Jeff Wilkins kick), 4:41 (STL 20–17)
- SEA – Kris Heppner 43-yard field goal, 0:20 (Tied 20–20)

Fourth quarter

- STL – Roland Williams 4-yard pass from Kurt Warner (Jeff Wilkins kick), 11:32 (STL 27–20)
- SEA – Ricky Watters 1-yard run (Kris Heppner kick), 7:40 (Tied 27–27)
- STL – Devin Bush 15-yard fumble return (Jeff Wilkins kick), 5:12 (STL 34–27)
- SEA – Darrell Jackson 34-yard pass from Jon Kitna (Kris Heppner kick), 2:05 (Tied 34–34)
- STL – Jeff Wilkins 27-yard field goal, 0:23 (STL 37–34)

Top passers

- STL – Kurt Warner: 35/47, 386 yds, 1 TD, 1 INT
- SEA – Jon Kitna: 20/31, 245 yds, 1 TD, 2 INT

Top rushers

- STL – Marshall Faulk: 15 car, 68 yds, 1 TD
- SEA – Ricky Watters: 16 car, 59 yds, 2 TD

Top receivers

- STL – Torry Holt: 6 rec, 101 yds
- SEA – Sean Dawkins: 6 rec, 70 yds

Team – pass – rush – total – to

- STL – 379 – 97 – 476 – 1
- SEA – 237 – 101 – 338 – 3

==== Week 3: vs. New Orleans Saints ====
Week Three: Seattle Seahawks vs. New Orleans Saints – Game summary

Quarter	1	2	3	4	Total
Saints	7	3	0	0	10
Seahawks	7	0	3	10	20

at Husky Stadium, Seattle

- Date: September 17
- Game time: 1:15 pm local
- Game weather: clear, 68 °F (20 °C), 80% humidity, wind variable 3 miles per hour (4.8 km/h)
- Game attendance: 59,513
- Referee: Walt Coleman
- TV announcers (Fox): Curt Menefee, Brian Baldinger, and Joe Trahan
- Gamebook

Game information

First quarter

- SEA – Ricky Watters 5-yard run (Kris Heppner kick), 8:35 (SEA 7–0)
- NO – Keith Poole 49-yard pass from Jeff Blake (Doug Brien kick), 0:57 (Tied 7–7)

Second quarter

- NO – Doug Brien 23-yard field goal, 2:37 (NO 10–7)

Third quarter

- SEA – Kris Heppner 31-yard field goal, 8:01 (Tied 10–10)

Fourth quarter

- SEA – Itula Mili 1-yard pass from Jon Kitna (Kris Heppner kick), 9:23 (SEA 17–10)
- SEA – Kris Heppner 45-yard field goal, 3:47 (SEA 20–10)

Top passers

- NO – Jeff Blake: 14/24, 159 yds, 1 TD
- SEA – Jon Kitna: 22/29, 193 yds, 1 TD, 1 INT

Top rushers

- NO – Ricky Williams: 23 car, 107 yds
- SEA – Ricky Watters: 22 car, 105 yds, 1 TD

Top receivers

- NO – Joe Horn: 7 rec, 68 yds
- SEA – Darrell Jackson: 5 rec, 59 yds

Team – pass – rush – total – to

- NO – 147 – 116 – 263 – 0
- SEA – 169 – 126 – 295 – 1

==== Week 4: at San Diego Chargers ====
Week Four: Seattle Seahawks at San Diego Chargers – Game summary

Quarter	1	2	3	4	Total
Seahawks	10	3	7	0	20
Chargers	6	6	0	0	12

at Qualcomm Stadium, San Diego, California

- Date: September 24
- Game time: 1:15 pm local
- Game weather: clear, 72 °F (22 °C), 52% humidity, wind WSW 9 miles per hour (14 km/h)
- Game attendance: 47,233
- Referee: Tony Corrente
- TV announcers (CBS): Bill Macatee, and Daryl Johnston
- Gamebook

Game information

First quarter

- SEA – Kris Heppner 25-yard field goal, 10:05 (SEA 3–0)
- SD – John Carney 41-yard field goal, 3:37 (Tied 3–3)
- SD – John Carney 28-yard field goal, 1:04 (SD 6–3)
- SEA – Darrell Jackson 68-yard pass from Jon Kitna (Kris Heppner kick), 0:05 (SEA 10–6)

Second quarter

- SD – John Carney 24-yard field goal, 3:56 (SEA 10–9)
- SEA – Kris Heppner 26-yard field goal, 0:36 (SEA 13–9)
- SD – John Carney 45-yard field goal, 0:00 (SEA 13–12)

Third quarter

- SEA – Willie Williams 69-yard interception return (Kris Heppner kick), 6:50 (SEA 20–12)

Fourth quarter

- No scoring plays

Top passers

- SEA – Jon Kitna: 11/21, 196 yds, 1 TD
- SD – Ryan Leaf: 16/26, 153 yds, 1 INT

Top rushers

- SEA – Ricky Watters: 16 car, 67 yds
- SD – Terrell Fletcher: 5 car, 40 yds

Top receivers

- SEA – Darrell Jackson: 1 rec, 68 yds, 1 TD
- SD – Freddie Jones: 8 rec, 82 yds

Team – pass – rush – total – to

- SEA – 161 – 108 – 269 – 2
- SD – 212 – 91 – 303 – 2

==== Week 5: at Kansas City Chiefs ====
Week Five: Seattle Seahawks at Kansas City Chiefs – Game summary

Quarter	1	2	3	4	Total
Seahawks	7	7	3	0	17
Chiefs	0	7	7	10	24

at Arrowhead Stadium, Kansas City, Missouri

- Date: October 2
- Game time: 8:00 pm local
- Game weather: clear, 74 °F (23 °C), 53% humidity, wind N 8 miles per hour (13 km/h)
- Game attendance: 78,502
- Referee: Ed Hochuli
- TV announcers (ABC): Al Michaels, Dan Fouts, Dennis Miller, Melissa Stark, and Eric Dickerson
- Gamebook

Game information

First quarter

- SEA – Itula Mili 1-yard pass from Jon Kitna (Rian Lindell kick), 1:34 (SEA 7–0)

Second quarter

- KC – Tony Gonzalez 15-yard pass from Elvis Grbac (Pete Stoyanovich kick), 6:59 (Tied 7–7)
- SEA – Shaun Alexander 7-yard run (Rian Lindell kick), 0:48 (SEA 14–7)

Third quarter

- SEA – Rian Lindell 27-yard field goal, 6:24 (SEA 17–7)
- KC – Derrick Alexander 17-yard pass from Elvis Grbac (Pete Stoyanovich kick), 2:15 (SEA 17–14)

Fourth quarter

- KC – Pete Stoyanovich 27-yard field goal, 11:42 (Tied 17–17)
- KC – Mike Cloud 15-yard run (Pete Stoyanovich kick), 4:26 (KC 24–17)

Top passers

- SEA – Jon Kitna: 17/28, 140 yds, 1 TD, 1 INT
- KC – Elvis Grbac: 16/27, 256 yds, 2 TD

Top rushers

- SEA – Ricky Watters: 16 car, 97 yds
- KC – Tony Richardson: 11 car, 53 yds

Top receivers

- SEA – Darrell Jackson: 4 rec, 51 yds
- KC – Derrick Alexander: 5 rec, 153 yds, 1 TD

Team – pass – rush – total – to

- SEA – 103 – 186 – 289 – 2
- KC – 242 – 136 – 378 – 0

==== Week 6: at Carolina Panthers ====
Week Six: Seattle Seahawks at Carolina Panthers – Game summary

Quarter	1	2	3	4	Total
Seahawks	0	0	3	0	3
Panthers	7	13	3	3	26

at Ericsson Stadium, Charlotte, North Carolina

- Date: October 8
- Game time: 4:15 pm local
- Game weather: cloudy, 50 °F (10 °C), 39% humidity, wind N 8 miles per hour (13 km/h)
- Game attendance: 72,192
- Referee: Phil Luckett
- TV announcers (CBS): Bill Macatee, and Charles Mann
- Gamebook

Game information

First quarter

- CAR – Donald Hayes 43-yard pass from Steve Beuerlein (Joe Nedney kick), 4:50 (CAR 7–0)

Second quarter

- CAR – William Floyd 5-yard pass from Steve Beuerlein (Joe Nedney kick), 11:36 (CAR 14–0)
- CAR – Joe Nedney 44-yard field goal, 2:05 (CAR 17–0)
- CAR – Joe Nedney 42-yard field goal, 0:00 (CAR 20–0)

Third quarter

- CAR – Joe Nedney 22-yard field goal, 4:05 (CAR 23–0)
- SEA – Rian Lindell 42-yard field goal, 0:54 (CAR 23–3)

Fourth quarter

- CAR – Joe Nedney 29-yard field goal, 8:04 (CAR 26–3)

Top passers

- SEA – Brock Huard: 19/34, 172 yds
- CAR – Steve Beuerlein: 27/39, 332 yds, 2 TD, 1 INT

Top rushers

- SEA – Ricky Watters: 10 car, 63 yds
- CAR – Tim Biakabutuka: 23 car, 103 yds

Top receivers

- SEA – Sean Dawkins: 5 rec, 61 yds
- CAR – Wesley Walls: 7 rec, 102 yds

Team – pass – rush – total – to

- SEA – 146 – 63 – 209 – 0
- CAR – 322 – 125 – 447 – 1

==== Week 7: vs. Indianapolis Colts ====
Week Seven: Seattle Seahawks vs. Indianapolis Colts – Game summary

Quarter	1	2	3	4	Total
Colts	7	13	14	3	37
Seahawks	0	17	0	7	24

at Husky Stadium, Seattle

- Date: October 15
- Game time: 1:05 pm local
- Game weather: overcast, 45 °F (7 °C), 70% humidity, wind S 10 miles per hour (16 km/h)
- Game attendance: 63,593
- Referee: Dick Hantak
- TV announcers (CBS): Kevin Harlan, Daryl Johnston, and Beasley Reece
- Gamebook

Game information

First quarter

- IND – Edgerrin James 26-yard run (Mike Vanderjagt kick), 11:05 (IND 7–0)

Second quarter

- IND – Mike Vanderjagt 23-yard field goal, 14:12 (IND 10–0)
- SEA – Darrell Jackson 8-yard pass from Brock Huard (Rian Lindell kick), 10:03 (IND 10–7)
- IND – Edgerrin James 3-yard run (Mike Vanderjagt kick), 6:54 (IND 17–7)
- SEA – Itula Mili 7-yard pass from Brock Huard (Rian Lindell kick), 1:56 (IND 17–14)
- IND – Mike Vanderjagt 38-yard field goal, 0:23 (IND 20–14)
- SEA – Rian Lindell 51-yard field goal, 0:00 (IND 20–17)

Third quarter

- IND – Ken Dilger 17-yard pass from Peyton Manning (Mike Vanderjagt kick), 8:33 (IND 27–17)
- IND – Edgerrin James 2-yard run (Mike Vanderjagt kick), 0:12 (IND 34–17)

Fourth quarter

- IND – Mike Vanderjagt 40-yard field goal, 10:40 (IND 37–17)
- SEA – Karsten Bailey 6-yard pass from Brock Huard (Rian Lindell kick), 5:12 (IND 37–24)

Top passers

- IND – Peyton Manning: 20/30, 281 yds, 1 TD
- SEA – Brock Huard: 19/26, 226 yds, 3 TD, 1 INT

Top rushers

- IND – Edgerrin James: 38 car, 219 yds, 3 TD
- SEA – Ricky Watters: 8 car, 24 yds

Top receivers

- IND – Marvin Harrison: 7 rec, 134 yds
- SEA – Sean Dawkins: 6 rec, 118 yds

Team – pass – rush – total – to

- IND – 280 – 219 – 499 – 1
- SEA – 252 – 65 – 317 – 3

==== Week 8: at Oakland Raiders ====
Week Eight: Seattle Seahawks at Oakland Raiders – Game summary

Quarter	1	2	3	4	Total
Seahawks	3	0	0	0	3
Raiders	7	14	0	10	31

at Oakland–Alameda County Coliseum, Oakland, California

- Date: October 22
- Game time: 1:05 pm local
- Game weather: clear, 70 °F (21 °C), 18% humidity, wind NE 31 miles per hour (50 km/h)
- Game attendance: 57,490
- Referee: Bill Carollo
- TV announcers (CBS): Greg Gumbel, Phil Simms, and Armen Keteyian
- Gamebook

Game information

First quarter

- SEA – Rian Lindell 44-yard field goal, 10:47 (SEA 3–0)
- OAK – Tim Brown 16-yard pass from Rich Gannon (Sebastian Janikowski kick), 3:05 (OAK 7–3)

Second quarter

- OAK – Tim Brown 9-yard pass from Rich Gannon (Sebastian Janikowski kick), 11:51 (OAK 14–3)
- OAK – Tyrone Wheatley 80-yard run (Sebastian Janikowski kick), 7:36 (OAK 21–3)

Third quarter

- No scoring plays

Fourth quarter

- OAK – Sebastian Janikowski 32-yard field goal, 13:33 (OAK 24–3)
- OAK – James Jett 23-yard pass from Rich Gannon (Sebastian Janikowski kick), 8:28 (OAK 31–3)

Top passers

- SEA – Jon Kitna: 11/18, 85 yds
- OAK – Rich Gannon: 15/22, 176 yds, 3 TD, 1 INT

Top rushers

- SEA – Ricky Watters: 17 car, 95 yds
- OAK – Tyrone Wheatley: 15 car, 156 yds, 1 TD

Top receivers

- SEA – Ricky Watters: 2 rec, 56 yds
- OAK – Randy Jordan: 2 rec, 35 yds

Team – pass – rush – total – to

- SEA – 146 – 137 – 283 – 3
- OAK – 174 – 206 – 380 – 1

==== Week 9: vs. Kansas City Chiefs ====
Week Nine: Seattle Seahawks vs. Kansas City Chiefs – Game summary

Quarter	1	2	3	4	Total
Chiefs	7	14	0	3	24
Seahawks	3	7	0	9	19

at Husky Stadium, Seattle

- Date: October 29
- Game time: 1:16 pm local
- Game weather: clear, 52 °F (11 °C), 80% humidity, wind W 5 miles per hour (8.0 km/h)
- Game attendance: 62,141
- Referee: Ron Blum
- TV announcers (CBS): Kevin Harlan, Daryl Johnston, and Beasley Reece
- Gamebook

Game information

First quarter

- SEA – Rian Lindell 50-yard field goal, 2:23 (SEA 3–0)
- KC – Derrick Alexander 59-yard pass from Elvis Grbac (Todd Peterson kick), 0:53 (KC 7–3)

Second quarter

- SEA – Christian Fauria 2-yard pass from Jon Kitna (Rian Lindell kick), 8:30 (SEA 10–7)
- KC – Derrick Alexander 50-yard pass from Elvis Grbac (Todd Peterson kick), 5:54 (KC 14–10)
- KC – Kevin Lockett 34-yard pass from Elvis Grbac (Todd Peterson kick), 2:20 (KC 21–10)

Third quarter

- No scoring plays

Fourth quarter

- SEA – Rian Lindell 24-yard field goal, 14:57 (KC 21–13)
- SEA – Ricky Watters 14-yard run (PAT failed), 5:53 (KC 21–19)
- KC – Todd Peterson 37-yard field goal, 0:42 (KC 24–19)

Top passers

- KC – Elvis Grbac: 22/35, 342 yds, 3 TD, 3 INT
- SEA – Jon Kitna: 26/42, 224 yds, 2 TD, 3 INT

Top rushers

- KC – Kimble Anders: 19 car, 54 yds
- SEA – Ricky Watters: 21 car, 90 yds

Top receivers

- KC – Derrick Alexander: 4 rec, 137 yds, 2 TD
- SEA – Sean Dawkins: 7 rec, 64 yds

Team – pass – rush – total – to

- KC – 334 – 76 – 410 – 3
- SEA – 208 – 143 – 351 – 4

==== Week 10: vs. San Diego Chargers ====
Week Ten: Seattle Seahawks vs. San Diego Chargers – Game summary

Quarter	1	2	3	4	Total
Chargers	0	3	9	3	15
Seahawks	0	14	0	3	17

at Husky Stadium, Seattle

- Date: November 5
- Game time: 1:15 pm local
- Game weather: showers, 48 °F (9 °C), 100% humidity, wind S 8 miles per hour (13 km/h)
- Game attendance: 59,884
- Referee: Larry Nemmers
- TV announcers (CBS): Bill Macatee, and Charles Mann
- Gamebook

Game information

First quarter

- No scoring plays

Second quarter

- SEA – Sean Dawkins 10-yard pass from Jon Kitna (Rian Lindell kick), 12:57 (SEA 7–0)
- SEA – Christian Fauria 10-yard pass from Jon Kitna (Rian Lindell kick), 8:34 (SEA 14–0)
- SD – John Carney 19-yard field goal, 0:00 (SEA 14–3)

Third quarter

- SD – John Carney 41-yard field goal, 9:11 (SEA 14–6)
- SD – Curtis Conway 10-yard pass from Jim Harbaugh (PAT failed), 4:12 (SEA 14–12)

Fourth quarter

- SD – John Carney 28-yard field goal, 5:36 (SD 15–14)
- SEA – Rian Lindell 48-yard field goal, 0:00 (SEA 17–15)

Top passers

- SD – Jim Harbaugh: 22/32, 236 yds, 1 TD, 1 INT
- SEA – Jon Kitna: 11/19, 85 yds, 2 TD, 1 INT

Top rushers

- SD – Jermaine Fazande: 22 car, 74 yds
- SEA – Ricky Watters: 21 car, 55 yds

Top receivers

- SD – Freddie Jones: 5 rec, 86 yds
- SEA – Darrell Jackson: 2 rec, 27 yds

Team – pass – rush – total – to

- SD – 282 – 116 – 398 – 3
- SEA – 78 – 50 – 128 – 1

==== Week 11: at Jacksonville Jaguars ====
Week Eleven: Seattle Seahawks at Jacksonville Jaguars – Game summary

Quarter	1	2	3	4	Total
Seahawks	0	14	7	7	28
Jaguars	7	14	0	0	21

at Alltel Stadium, Jacksonville, Florida

- Date: November 12
- Game time: 1:02 pm local
- Game weather: 69 °F (21 °C), wind NW 8 miles per hour (13 km/h)
- Game attendance: 68,063
- Referee: Tom White
- TV announcers (CBS): Don Criqui, and Steve Tasker
- Gamebook

Game information

First quarter

- JAX – Mark Brunell 2-yard run (Mike Hollis kick), 2:13 (JAX 7–0)

Second quarter

- SEA – Ricky Watters 1-yard run (Rian Lindell kick), 11:24 (Tied 7–7)
- JAX – Fred Taylor 10-yard run (Mike Hollis kick), 3:00 (JAX 14–7)
- JAX – Keenan McCardell 22-yard pass from Mark Brunell (Mike Hollis kick), 1:16 (JAX 21–7)
- SEA – Sean Dawkins 15-yard pass from Jon Kitna (Rian Lindell kick), 0:13 (JAX 21–14)

Third quarter

- SEA – Derrick Mayes 8-yard pass from Jon Kitna (Rian Lindell kick), 4:17 (Tied 21–21)

Fourth quarter

- SEA – Ricky Watters 4-yard pass from Jon Kitna (Rian Lindell kick), 2:01 (SEA 28–21)

Top passers

- SEA – Jon Kitna: 22/33, 231 yds, 3 TD
- JAX – Mark Brunell: 24/33, 340 yds, 1 TD

Top rushers

- SEA – Ricky Watters: 24 car, 80 yds, 1 TD
- JAX – Fred Taylor: 21 car, 103 yds, 1 TD

Top receivers

- SEA – Sean Dawkins: 6 rec, 92 yds, 1 TD
- JAX – Keenan McCardell: 6 rec, 156 yds, 1 TD

Team – pass – rush – total – to

- SEA – 230 – 96 – 326 – 0
- JAX – 315 – 122 – 437 – 1

==== Week 13: vs. Denver Broncos ====
Week Thirteen: Seattle Seahawks vs. Denver Broncos – Game summary

Quarter	1	2	3	4	Total
Broncos	0	10	7	21	38
Seahawks	0	14	10	7	31

at Husky Stadium, Seattle

- Date: November 26
- Game time: 1:16 pm local
- Game weather: rain, 48 °F (9 °C), 90% humidity, wind N 9 miles per hour (14 km/h)
- Game attendance: 68,661
- Referee: Bill Carollo
- TV announcers (CBS): Gus Johnson, and Brent Jones
- Gamebook

Game information

First quarter

- No scoring plays

Second quarter

- SEA – Michael Sinclair 63-yard fumble return (Rian Lindell kick), 11:39 (SEA 7–0)
- DEN – Jason Elam 35-yard field goal, 6:33 (SEA 7–3)
- SEA – Ricky Watters 1-yard run (Rian Lindell kick), 2:54 (SEA 14–3)
- DEN – Desmond Clark 18-yard pass from Gus Frerotte (Jason Elam kick), 1:36 (SEA 14–10)

Third quarter

- DEN – Mike Anderson 15-yard run (Jason Elam kick), 6:57 (DEN 17–14)
- SEA – Chad Brown 10-yard fumble return (Rian Lindell kick), 2:12 (SEA 21–17)
- SEA – Rian Lindell 42-yard field goal, 0:27 (SEA 24–17)

Fourth quarter

- DEN – Rod Smith 50-yard run (Jason Elam kick), 12:37 (Tied 24–24)
- DEN – Jimmy Spencer 22-yard interception return (Jason Elam kick), 5:54 (DEN 31–24)
- SEA – Sean Dawkins 8-yard pass from Jon Kitna (Rian Lindell kick), 4:02 (Tied 31-31
- DEN – Mike Anderson 80-yard run (Jason Elam kick), 3:34 (DEN 38–31)

Top passers

- DEN – Gus Frerotte: 15/31, 244 yds, 1 TD, 2 INT
- SEA – Jon Kitna: 20/42, 226 yds, 1 TD, 2 INT

Top rushers

- DEN – Mike Anderson: 30 car, 195 yds, 2 TD
- SEA – Ricky Watters: 16 car, 77 yds, 1 TD

Top receivers

- DEN – Rod Smith: 4 rec, 82 yds
- SEA – Ricky Watters: 9 rec, 126 yds

Team – pass – rush – total – to

- DEN – 237 – 301 – 538 – 5
- SEA – 269 – 85 – 354 – 3

==== Week 14: at Atlanta Falcons ====
Week Fourteen: Seattle Seahawks at Atlanta Falcons – Game summary

Quarter	1	2	3	4	Total
Seahawks	17	7	6	0	30
Falcons	0	3	0	7	10

at Georgia Dome, Atlanta

- Date: December 3
- Game time: 1:05 pm local
- Game weather: indoors
- Game attendance: 44,680
- Referee: Ron Winter
- TV announcers (CBS): Bill Macatee, and Charles Mann
- Gamebook

Game information

First quarter

- SEA – Darrell Jackson 6-yard pass from Jon Kitna (Rian Lindell kick), 11:18 (SEA 7–0)
- SEA – George Koonce 27-yard interception return (Rian Lindell kick), 10:57 (SEA 14–0)
- SEA – Rian Lindell 46-yard field goal, 2:46 (SEA 17–0)

Second quarter

- ATL – Morten Andersen 36-yard field goal, 3:13 (SEA 17–3)
- SEA – Ricky Watters 1-yard run (Rian Lindell kick), 1:38 (SEA 24–3)

Third quarter

- SEA – Rian Lindell 45-yard field goal, 11:42 (SEA 27–3)
- SEA – Rian Lindell 29-yard field goal, 4:19 (SEA 30–3)

Fourth quarter

- ATL – Reggie Kelly 19-yard pass from Doug Johnson (Morten Andersen kick), 13:48 (SEA 30–10)

Top passers

- SEA – Jon Kitna: 25/34, 252 yds, 1 TD
- ATL – Doug Johnson: 17/33, 233 yds, 1 TD, 2 INT

Top rushers

- SEA – Ricky Watters: 21 car, 79 yds, 1 TD
- ATL – Jamal Anderson: 12 car, 43 yds

Top receivers

- SEA – Darrell Jackson: 5 rec, 98 yds, 1 TD
- ATL – Shawn Jefferson: 3 rec, 59 yds

Team – pass – rush – total – to

- SEA – 252 – 83 – 335 – 0
- ATL – 204 – 97 – 301 – 4

==== Week 15 at Denver Broncos ====
Week Fifteen: Seattle Seahawks at Denver Broncos – Game summary

Quarter	1	2	3	4	Total
Seahawks	3	0	7	14	24
Broncos	7	7	10	7	31

at Mile High Stadium, Denver, Colorado

- Date: December 10
- Game time: 2:05 pm local
- Game weather: cloudy, 22 °F (−6 °C), 91% humidity, wind E 10 miles per hour (16 km/h)
- Game attendance: 75,218
- Referee: Phil Luckett
- TV announcers (CBS): Dick Enberg, Dan Dierdorf, and Bonnie Bernstein
- Gamebook

Game information

First quarter

- SEA – Rian Lindell 23-yard field goal, 9:05 (SEA 3–0)
- DEN – Ed McCaffrey 5-yard pass from Gus Frerotte (Jason Elam kick), 5:08 (DEN 7–3)

Second quarter

- DEN – Jimmy Spencer 79-yard interception return (Jason Elam kick), 11:46 (DEN 14–3)

Third quarter

- DEN – Mike Anderson 1-yard run (Jason Elam kick), 7:51 (DEN 21–3)
- DEN – Jason Elam 38-yard field goal, 6:16 (DEN 24–3)
- SEA – Sean Dawkins 4-yard pass from Jon Kitna (Rian Lindell kick), 0:58 (DEN 24–10)

Fourth quarter

- SEA – Darrell Jackson 9-yard pass from Jon Kitna (Rian Lindell kick), 9:21 (DEN 24–17)
- DEN – Mike Anderson 6-yard run (Jason Elam kick), 5:57 (DEN 31–17)
- SEA – Sean Dawkins 22-yard pass from Jon Kitna (Rian Lindell kick), 2:28 (DEN 31–24)

Top passers

- SEA – Jon Kitna: 26/41, 298 yds, 3 TD, 3 INT
- DEN – Gus Frerotte: 14/25, 201 yds, 1 TD, 1 INT

Top rushers

- SEA – Ricky Watters: 16 car, 57 yds
- DEN – Mike Anderson: 29 car, 131 yds, 2 TD

Top receivers

- SEA – Sean Dawkins: 6 rec, 85 yds, 2 TD
- DEN – Ed McCaffrey: 8 rec, 112 yds, 1 TD

Team – pass – rush – total – to

- SEA – 298 – 107 – 405 – 4
- DEN – 182 – 131 – 313 – 1

==== Week 16: vs. Oakland Raiders ====
Week Sixteen: Seattle Seahawks vs. Oakland Raiders – Game summary

Quarter	1	2	3	4	Total
Raiders	7	3	7	7	24
Seahawks	10	3	0	14	27

at Husky Stadium, Seattle

- Date: December 16
- Game time: 1:06 pm local
- Game weather: rain, 52 °F (11 °C), 63% humidity, wind S 21 miles per hour (34 km/h)
- Game attendance: 68,681
- Referee: Bernie Kukar
- TV announcers (CBS): Dick Enberg, Dan Dierdorf, and Bonnie Bernstein
- Gamebook

Game information

First quarter

- SEA – Mack Strong 13-yard pass from Jon Kitna (Rian Lindell kick), 11:43 (SEA 7–0)
- OAK – Andre Rison 14-yard pass from Rich Gannon (Sebastian Janikowski kick), 7:12 (Tied 7–7)
- SEA – Rian Lindell 40-yard field goal, 0:58 (SEA 10–7)

Second quarter

- OAK – Sebastian Janikowski 25-yard field goal, 6:04 (Tied 10–10)
- SEA – Rian Lindell 52-yard field goal, 0:00 (SEA 13–10)

Third quarter

- OAK – Randy Jordan 6-yard run (Sebastian Janikowski kick), 6:58 (OAK 17–13)

Fourth quarter

- OAK – Randy Jordan 7-yard run (Sebastian Janikowski kick), 11:48 (OAK 24–13)
- SEA – Shaun Alexander 4-yard run (PAT failed), 5:15 (OAK 24–19)
- SEA – Safety, James Williams tackled Marquez Pope in end zone, 2:24 (OAK 24–21)
- SEA – Darrell Jackson 13-yard pass from Jon Kitna (PAT failed), 0:28 (SEA 27–24)

Top passers

- OAK – Rich Gannon: 5/17, 136 yds, 1 TD, 3 INT
- SEA – Jon Kitna: 19/30, 177 yds, 2 TD, 1 INT

Top rushers

- OAK – Tyrone Wheatley: 26 car, 146 yds
- SEA – Ricky Watters: 26 car, 168 yds

Top receivers

- OAK – Randy Jordan: 1 rec, 55 yds
- SEA – Darrell Jackson: 4 rec, 52 yds, 1 TD

Team – pass – rush – total – to

- OAK – 134 – 227 – 361 – 3
- SEA – 153 – 173 – 326 – 2

==== Week 17: vs. Buffalo Bills ====
Week Seventeen: Seattle Seahawks vs. Buffalo Bills – Game summary

Quarter	1	2	3	4	Total
Bills	21	7	7	7	42
Seahawks	7	7	3	6	23

at Husky Stadium, Seattle

- Date: December 23
- Game time: 5:36 pm local
- Game weather: rain, 41 °F (5 °C), 100% humidity, wind SE 3 miles per hour (4.8 km/h)
- Game attendance: 61,025
- Referee: Ron Blum
- TV announcers (ESPN): Mike Patrick, Paul Maguire, Joe Theismann, and Solomon Wilcots
- Gamebook

Game information

First quarter

- BUF – Shawn Bryson 11-yard pass from Doug Flutie (Steve Christie kick), 10:20 (BUF 7–0)
- BUF – Peerless Price 18-yard pass from Doug Flutie (Steve Christie kick), 3:23 (BUF 14–0)
- SEA – Charlie Rogers 81-yard kickoff return (Rian Lindell kick), 3:08 (BUF 14–7)
- BUF – Antowain Smith 9-yard run (Steve Christie kick), 1:29 (BUF 21–7)

Second quarter

- SEA – Jon Kitna 1-yard run (Rian Lindell kick), 9:40 (BUF 21–14)
- BUF – Jay Riemersma 6-yard pass from Doug Flutie (Steve Christie kick), 1:09 (BUF 28–14)

Third quarter

- SEA – Rian Lindell 38-yard field goal, 6:46 (BUF 28–17)
- BUF – Antowain Smith 2-yard run (Steve Christie kick), 0:26 (BUF 35–17)

Fourth quarter

- SEA – Ricky Watters 6-yard run (PAT failed), 9:29 (BUF 35–23)
- BUF – Antowain Smith 4-yard run (Steve Christie kick), 6:43 (BUF 42–23)

Top passers

- BUF – Doug Flutie: 20/25, 366 yds, 3 TD
- SEA – Jon Kitna: 18/29, 195 yds, 1 INT

Top rushers

- BUF – Antowain Smith: 17 car, 147 yds, 3 TD
- SEA – Ricky Watters: 17 car, 67 yds, 1 TD

Top receivers

- BUF – Peerless Price: 8 rec, 132 yds, 1 TD
- SEA – Ricky Watters: 5 rec, 47 yds

Team – pass – rush – total – to

- BUF – 366 – 213 – 579 – 2
- SEA – 186 – 126 – 312 – 4
