= 1999 Seattle Seahawks season =

American football team season

- Owner: Paul Allen
- General manager: Mike Holmgren
- Head coach: Mike Holmgren
- Offensive coordinator: Mike Sherman
- Home stadium: Kingdome

Results
- Record: 9–7
- Division place: 1st AFC West
- Playoffs: Lost Wild Card Playoffs (vs. Dolphins) 17–20
- All-Pros: PR Charlie Rogers (1st team)
- Pro Bowlers: OT Walter Jones; DT Cortez Kennedy; LB Chad Brown

The 1999 Seattle Seahawks season was the franchise's 24th season in the National Football League (NFL), the last playing their home games at the Kingdome and the first under head coach Mike Holmgren. It was also the first season that Seattle made the playoffs in eleven seasons. It would be Seattle's last playoff appearance as an American Football Conference (AFC) team. They would not return to the playoffs until 2003, after being moved to the National Football Conference (NFC).

Seattle finished out the season with a 9-7 record, which tied them atop a very weak AFC West with the Kansas City Chiefs, but the Seahawks won the tiebreaker over the Chiefs because they beat them twice in the regular season. In their final game at the Kingdome, the Seahawks lost to the Miami Dolphins in what turned out to be the final career playoff win for Dan Marino.

Beginning the next season, the Seahawks played their home games at Husky Stadium while construction for Lumen Field was taking place. They didn't move into their new and current home until the 2002 season.

== Offseason ==
After the 1998 season, head coach Mike Holmgren left Green Bay to become the coach of the Seahawks. Holmgren was hired on January 8, 1999, to be the executive vice president, general manager and head coach.

=== 1999 expansion draft ===
Seahawks selected during the expansion draft
Pick	Name	Position	Expansion team
8	Jason Kyle	Long snapper	Cleveland Browns
30	Eric Stokes	Safety	Cleveland Browns

=== NFL draft ===
1999 Seattle Seahawks draft
Round	Pick	Player	Position	College	Notes
1	22	Lamar King	Defensive end	Saginaw Valley State	from Dallas
3	77	Brock Huard	Quarterback	Washington	from Oakland
3	82	Karsten Bailey	Wide receiver	Auburn	from New England
4	115	Antonio Cochran	Defensive end	Georgia	
5	140	Floyd Wedderburn	Offensive tackle	Penn State	from Carolina
5	152	Charlie Rogers	Wide receiver	Georgia Tech	
6	170	Steve Johnson	Cornerback	Tennessee	from Cleveland
Made roster † Pro Football Hall of Fame * Made at least one Pro Bowl during career

=== Undrafted free agents ===
1999 undrafted free agents of note
Player	Position	College
Jamie Kohl	Kicker	Iowa State
Kevin Kreinhagen	Quarterback	Indianapolis

== Personnel ==
=== Staff ===
1999 Seattle Seahawks staff
**Front office**: Chairman – Paul Allen; President – Bob Whitsitt; Senior vice president – Mike Reinfeldt; Vice president of football operations – Randy Mueller; Director of player personnel – John Dorsey; Director of pro personnel – Will Lewis; Director of college scouting – Don Deisch; Assistant to the general manager – Gary Reynolds; Administrative assistant/football operations – Bill Nayes; **Head coaches**: Executive vice president of football operations/general manager/head coach – Mike Holmgren; Assistant head coach/offensive line – Tom Lovat; **Offensive coaches**: Offensive coordinator/tight ends – Mike Sherman; Quarterbacks – Mike Sheppard; Running backs – Stump Mitchell; Wide receivers – Nolan Cromwell; Offensive quality control – Jerry Colquitt	**Defensive coaches**: Defensive coordinator – Fritz Shurmur (died Aug 30); Defensive line – Larry Brooks; Linebackers – Jim Lind; Defensive backs – Ken Flajole; Defensive quality control – Clayton Lopez; Defensive assistant – Dick Roach; Defensive assistant – Bob Zeman; **Special teams coaches**: Special teams coordinator – Pete Rodriguez; **Strength and conditioning**: Strength and conditioning – Kent Johnston; Assistant strength and conditioning – Rod Springer

=== Final roster ===
1999 Seattle Seahawks roster
**Quarterbacks (QB)**: 13 Glenn Foley; 5 Brock Huard; **7** Jon Kitna; **Running backs (RB)**: **34** Reggie Brown FB; 30 Ahman Green; 44 Brian Milne; 31 Charlie Rogers; 38 Mack Strong FB; **32** Ricky Watters; **Wide receivers (WR)**: 83 Karsten Bailey; 19 Fabien Bownes; **81** Sean Dawkins; 84 Joey Galloway; **87** Derrick Mayes; 85 Mike Pritchard; **Tight ends (TE)**: **86** Christian Fauria; 88 Deems May; 49 Itula Mili	**Offensive linemen (OL)**: 63 Frank Beede G; 60 Greg Bloedorn C; **62** Chris Gray C; **68** Brian Habib G; **71** Walter Jones T; **66** Pete Kendall G; 69 Floyd Wedderburn G; 74 Todd Weiner T; **79** Grant Williams T; **Defensive linemen (DL)**: **98** Sam Adams DT; 90 Antonio Cochran DE; **93** Phillip Daniels DE; **96** Cortez Kennedy DT; 92 Lamar King DE; 99 Matt LaBounty DE; 97 Riddick Parker DT; **70** Michael Sinclair DE	**Linebackers (LB)**: **94** Chad Brown OLB; 56 James Logan OLB; **51** Anthony Simmons MLB; **59** Darrin Smith OLB; 95 James Willis MLB; **Defensive backs (DB)**: **20** Jay Bellamy FS; 26 Chris Canty CB; 43 Joey Eloms CB; 21 Randy Fuller CB; 36 Merton Hanks CB; 28 Kerry Joseph SS; **24** Shawn Springs CB; 25 Brian Walker FS; **33** Darryl Williams SS; **27** Willie Williams CB; **Special teams (ST)**: 10 Jeff Feagles P; 2 Todd Peterson K; 61 Mark Rodenhauser LS	**Practice squad**: 29 Michael Black RB; 23 Reggie Doster CB; 48 Rufus French TE; 52 Jason McEndoo C; 46 Ron Merkerson LB; **Reserve**: 65 Mondell Corbett G (IR); 53 Kevin Glover C (IR); 41 Dustin Johnson FB (IR); 50 DeShone Myles LB (IR); 22 Fred Thomas CB (IR); Rookies in italics 53 active, 5 reserve, 5 practice squad

- Starters in bold.
- (*) Denotes players that were selected for the 2000 Pro Bowl.

== Schedule ==
=== Preseason ===
Week	Date	Opponent	Result	Record	Game site	Recap
1	August 14	Buffalo Bills	**L** 10–24	0–1	Kingdome	Recap
2	August 19	at San Francisco 49ers	**L** 23–24	0–2	Candlestick Park	Recap
3	August 28	Arizona Cardinals	**W** 41–7	1–2	Kingdome	Recap
4	September 2	at Indianapolis Colts	**L** 28–31	1–3	RCA Dome	Recap

Source: Seahawks Media Guides

=== Regular season ===
Divisional matchups have the AFC West playing the NFC Central.

Week	Date	Opponent	Result	Record	Game site	Recap
1	September 12	Detroit Lions	**L** 20–28	0–1	Kingdome	Recap
2	September 19	at Chicago Bears	**W** 14–13	1–1	Soldier Field	Recap
3	September 26	at Pittsburgh Steelers	**W** 29–10	2–1	Three Rivers Stadium	Recap
4	October 3	**Oakland Raiders**	**W** 22–21	3–1	Kingdome	Recap
5	Bye					
6	October 17	at **San Diego Chargers**	**L** 10–13	3–2	Qualcomm Stadium	Recap
7	October 24	Buffalo Bills	**W** 26–16	4–2	Kingdome	Recap
8	November 1	at Green Bay Packers	**W** 27–7	5–2	Lambeau Field	Recap
9	November 7	Cincinnati Bengals	**W** 37–20	6–2	Kingdome	Recap
10	November 14	**Denver Broncos**	**W** 20–17	7–2	Kingdome	Recap
11	November 21	at **Kansas City Chiefs**	**W** 31–19	8–2	Arrowhead Stadium	Recap
12	November 28	Tampa Bay Buccaneers	**L** 3–16	8–3	Kingdome	Recap
13	December 5	at **Oakland Raiders**	**L** 21–30	8–4	Network Associates Coliseum	Recap
14	December 12	**San Diego Chargers**	**L** 16–19	8–5	Kingdome	Recap
15	December 19	at **Denver Broncos**	**L** 30–36 (OT)	8–6	Mile High Stadium	Recap
16	December 26	**Kansas City Chiefs**	**W** 23–14	9–6	Kingdome	Recap
17	January 2	at New York Jets	**L** 9–19	9–7	Giants Stadium	Recap
Note: Intra-division opponents are in **bold** text.

Source: 1999 NFL season results

=== Postseason ===
Round	Date	Opponent (seed)	Result	Record	Game site	Recap
Wild Card	January 9, 2000	Miami Dolphins (6)	**L** 17–20	0–1	Kingdome	Recap

This game was the last event held in the Kingdome (1976–2000). On March 26, 2000, the Kingdome was imploded to make way for Seahawks Stadium.

== Standings ==
AFC West
	W	L	T	PCT	PF	PA	STK
^{(3)} Seattle Seahawks	9	7	0	.563	338	298	L1
Kansas City Chiefs	9	7	0	.563	390	322	L2
San Diego Chargers	8	8	0	.500	269	316	W2
Oakland Raiders	8	8	0	.500	390	329	W1
Denver Broncos	6	10	0	.375	314	318	L1

== Game summaries ==
=== Preseason ===
==== Week P1: vs. Buffalo Bills ====
Preseason Week One: Seattle Seahawks vs. Buffalo Bills – Game summary

Quarter	1	2	3	4	Total
Bills	0	3	14	7	24
Seahawks	3	0	7	0	10

at Kingdome, Seattle

- Date: August 14
- Game time: 6:00 pm local
- Game weather: indoors
- Game attendance: 66,285
- TV: KING

==== Week P2: at San Francisco 49ers ====
Preseason Week Two: Seattle Seahawks at San Francisco 49ers – Game summary

Quarter	1	2	3	4	Total
Seahawks	3	7	7	6	23
49ers	0	3	0	21	24

at 3Com Park, San Francisco

- Date: August 19
- Game time: 5:00 pm local
- Game attendance: 66,193
- TV: ESPN, KING

==== Week P3: vs. Arizona Cardinals ====
Preseason Week Three: Seattle Seahawks vs. Arizona Cardinals – Game summary

Quarter	1	2	3	4	Total
Cardinals	0	0	0	7	7
Seahawks	7	10	14	10	41

at Kingdome, Seattle

- Date: August 28
- Game time: 7:00 pm local
- Game weather: indoors
- Game attendance: 66,277
- TV: KING

==== Week P4: at Indianapolis Colts ====
Preseason Week Four: Seattle Seahawks at Indianapolis Colts – Game summary

Quarter	1	2	3	4	Total
Seahawks	6	7	9	6	28
Colts	3	14	0	14	31

at RCA Dome, Indianapolis, Indiana

- Date: September 2
- Game time: 8:00 pm local
- Game weather: indoors
- Game attendance: 41,074
- TV: KING

=== Regular season ===
==== Week 1: vs. Detroit Lions ====
Week One: Seattle Seahawks vs. Detroit Lions – Game summary

Quarter	1	2	3	4	Total
Lions	3	22	0	3	28
Seahawks	0	7	7	6	20

at Kingdome, Seattle

- Date: September 12, 1999
- Game time: 1:15 pm local
- Game weather: indoors
- Game attendance: 66,238
- Referee: Dick Hantak
- TV announcers (Fox): Paul Kennedy, Dave Lapham, and Jennifer Hammond
- Gamebook

Game information

First quarter

- DET – Jason Hanson 51-yard field goal, 12:06 (DET 3–0)

Second quarter

- DET – Germane Crowell 16-yard pass from Charlie Batch (Jason Hanson kick), 14:55 (DET 10–0)
- DET – David Sloan 5-yard pass from Charlie Batch (PAT failed), 10:26 (DET 16–0)
- DET – Safety, punt snap out of end zone, 9:28 (DET 18–0)
- SEA – Willie Williams 40-yard interception return (Todd Peterson kick), 9:14 (DET 18–7)
- DET – Germane Crowell 41-yard pass from Charlie Batch (Jason Hanson kick), 4:33 (DET 25–7)

Third quarter

- SEA – Sean Dawkins 26-yard pass from Jon Kitna (Todd Peterson kick), 3:29 (DET 25–14)

Fourth quarter

- SEA – Sean Dawkins 3-yard pass from Jon Kitna (PAT failed), 7:11 (DET 25–20)
- DET – Jason Hanson 49-yard field goal, 2:10 (DET 28–20)

Top passers

- DET – Charlie Batch: 16/26, 216 yds, 3 TD, 1 INT
- SEA – Jon Kitna: 20/30, 202 yds, 2 TD

Top rushers

- DET – Ron Rivers: 16 car, 96 yds
- SEA – Ricky Watters: 13 car, 21 yds

Top receivers

- DET – Germane Crowell: 7 rec, 141 yds, 2 TD
- SEA – Sean Dawkins: 7 rec, 85 yds, 2 TD

Team – pass – rush – total – to

- DET – 202 – 167 – 369 – 1
- SEA – 174 – 31 – 205 – 2

Mike Holmgren’s debut as Seahawks head coach was a 28–20 loss to Lions team playing without the now-retired Barry Sanders and which had beaten him as Packers coach the year before at The Silverdome. Despite scoring two touchdowns in the final ten minutes Jon Kitna failed on a fourth down attempt in the final minute.

==== Week 2: at Chicago Bears ====
Week Two: Seattle Seahawks at Chicago Bears – Game summary

Quarter	1	2	3	4	Total
Seahawks	0	0	0	14	14
Bears	0	10	3	0	13

at Soldier Field, Chicago, Illinois

- Date: September 19, 1999
- Game time: 12:03 pm local
- Game weather: clear, 76 °F (24 °C), 34% humidity, wind SW 15 miles per hour (24 km/h)
- Game attendance: 66,944
- Referee: Mike Carey
- TV announcers (CBS): Kevin Harlan and Sam Wyche
- Gamebook

Game information

First quarter

  - No scoring plays

Second quarter

- CHI – Curtis Enis 2-yard run (Brian Gowins kick), 10:20 (CHI 7–0)
- CHI – Brian Gowins 29-yard field goal, 3:27 (CHI 10–0)

Third quarter

- CHI – Brian Gowins 43-yard field goal, 2:07 (CHI 13–0)

Fourth quarter

- SEA – Derrick Mayes 34-yard pass from Glenn Foley (Todd Peterson kick), 13:04 (CHI 13–7)
- SEA – Fabien Bownes 49-yard pass from Glenn Foley (Todd Peterson kick), 7:51 (SEA 14–13)

Top passers

- SEA – Glenn Foley: 18/30, 283 yds, 2 TD
- CHI – Shane Matthews: 22/42, 212 yds

Top rushers

- SEA – Ricky Watters: 23 car, 99 yds
- CHI – Curtis Enis: 25 car, 94 yds, 1 TD

Top receivers

- SEA – Derrick Mayes: 7 rec, 137 yds, 1 TD
- CHI – Marcus Robinson: 3 rec, 42 yds

Team – pass – rush – total – to

- SEA – 249 – 100 – 349 – 3
- CHI – 196 – 115 – 311 – 1

==== Week 3: at Pittsburgh Steelers ====
Week Three: Seattle Seahawks at Pittsburgh Steelers – Game summary

Quarter	1	2	3	4	Total
Seahawks	17	9	0	3	29
Steelers	0	0	0	10	10

at Three Rivers Stadium, Pittsburgh, Pennsylvania

- Date: September 26, 1999
- Game time: 1:01 pm local
- Game weather: clear, 61 °F (16 °C), wind S 8 miles per hour (13 km/h)
- Game attendance: 57,881
- Referee: Phil Luckett
- TV announcers (CBS): Kevin Harlan, Sam Wyche, and Marcus Allen
- Gamebook

Game information

First quarter

- SEA – Merton Hanks 23-yard interception return (Todd Peterson kick), 13:52 (SEA 7–0)
- SEA – Charlie Rogers 94-yard punt return (Todd Peterson kick), 11:40 (SEA 14–0)
- SEA – Todd Peterson 45-yard field goal, 6:53 (SEA 17–0)

Second quarter

- SEA – Todd Peterson 51-yard field goal, 9:53 (SEA 20–0)
- SEA – Todd Peterson 41-yard field goal, 3:14 (SEA 23–0)
- SEA – Todd Peterson 26-yard field goal, 0:02 (SEA 26–0)

Third quarter

- No scoring plays

Fourth quarter

- PIT – Kris Brown 33-yard field goal, 12:03 (SEA 26–3)
- SEA – Todd Peterson 38-yard field goal, 4:24 (SEA 29–3)
- PIT – Troy Edwards 16-yard pass from Mike Tomczak (Kris Brown kick), 1:35 (SEA 29–10)

Top passers

- SEA – Jon Kitna: 18/29, 265 yds
- PIT – Mike Tomczak: 14/27, 159 yds, 1 TD, 2 INT

Top rushers

- SEA – Ricky Watters: 29 car, 98 yds
- PIT – Jerome Bettis: 11 car, 39 yds

Top receivers

- SEA – Sean Dawkins: 5 rec, 105 yds
- PIT – Troy Edwards: 6 rec, 72 yds, 1 TD

Team – pass – rush – total – to

- SEA – 251 – 90 – 341 – 2
- PIT – 207 – 65 – 272 – 5

The Seahawks finished their two-game road trip by intercepting Kordell Stewart three times (ex-49er Merton Hanks scored on the first pick not three minutes in) and Mike Tomczak twice while kicker Todd Peterson booted five field goals and running back John Edward Rogers caught a Steelers punt at his six and scored.

==== Week 4: vs. Oakland Raiders ====
Week Four: Seattle Seahawks vs. Oakland Raiders – Game summary

Quarter	1	2	3	4	Total
Raiders	7	7	7	0	21
Seahawks	3	6	10	3	22

at Kingdome, Seattle

- Date: October 3, 1999
- Game time: 5:24 pm local
- Game weather: indoors
- Game attendance: 66,400
- Referee: Bernie Kukar
- TV announcers (ESPN): Mike Patrick, Joe Theismann, Paul Maguire, and Solomon Wilcots
- Gamebook

Game information

First quarter

- OAK – Tyrone Wheatley 7-yard run (Michael Husted kick), 11:05 (OAK 7–0)
- SEA – Todd Peterson 28-yard field goal, 3:36 (OAK 7–3)

Second quarter

- OAK – Tim Brown 6-yard pass from Rich Gannon (Michael Husted kick), 11:08 (OAK 14–3)
- SEA – Derrick Mayes 35-yard pass from Jon Kitna (PAT failed), 0:59 (OAK 14–9)

Third quarter

- OAK – Rickey Dudley 3-yard pass from Rich Gannon (Michael Husted kick), 11:24 (OAK 21–9)
- SEA – Reggie Brown 21-yard pass from Jon Kitna (Todd Peterson kick), 6:46 (OAK 21–16)
- SEA – Todd Peterson 29-yard field goal, 1:58 (OAK 21–19)

Fourth quarter

- SEA – Todd Peterson 45-yard field goal, 10:07 (SEA 22–21)

Top passers

- OAK – Rich Gannon: 19/34, 220 yds, 2 TD, 1 INT
- SEA – Jon Kitna: 15/30, 213 yds, 2 TD, 1 INT

Top rushers

- OAK – Tyrone Wheatley: 20 car, 100 yds, 1 TD
- SEA – Ricky Watters: 24 car, 71 yds

Top receivers

- OAK – Tim Brown: 4 rec, 56 yds, 1 TD
- SEA – Mike Pritchard: 3 rec, 59 yds

Team – pass – rush – total – to

- OAK – 217 – 166 – 383 – 1
- SEA – 201 – 75 – 276 – 1

Rich Gannon led three touchdown drives for the Raiders in the game’s first 35 minutes; in that span Jon Kitna threw a touchdown to Derrick Mayes, a field goal and an interception, but in a roughly 11-minute span down 21–9 Kitna threw another touchdown (to Reggie Brown) and two successful field goals. The Raiders got the ball back with forty-five seconds left but a 61-yard kick missed resulting a Seahawks win.

==== Week 6: at San Diego Chargers ====
Week Six: Seattle Seahawks at San Diego Chargers – Game summary

Quarter	1	2	3	4	Total
Seahawks	0	3	7	0	10
Chargers	0	7	0	6	13

at San Diego Stadium, San Diego, California

- Date: October 17, 1999
- Game time: 1:05 pm local
- Game weather: clear, 78 °F (26 °C), 47% humidity, wind WSW 9 miles per hour (14 km/h)
- Game attendance: 59,432
- Referee: Bill Carollo
- TV announcers (CBS): Ian Eagle and Mark May
- Gamebook

Game information

First quarter

- No scoring plays

Second quarter

- SEA – Todd Peterson 40-yard field goal, 4:13 (SEA 3–0)
- SD – Natrone Means 5-yard run (John Carney kick), 0:42 (SD 7–3)

Third quarter

- SEA – Itula Mili 1-yard pass from Jon Kitna (Todd Peterson kick), 5:37 (SEA 10–7)

Fourth quarter

- SD – John Carney 28-yard field goal, 2:45 (Tied 10–10)
- SD – John Carney 41-yard field goal, 0:00 (SD 13–10)

Top passers

- SEA – Jon Kitna: 17/29, 151 yds, 1 TD, 1 INT
- SD – Erik Kramer: 27/44, 296 yds, 4 INT

Top rushers

- SEA – Ricky Watters: 21 car, 54 yds, 0 TD
- SD – Natrone Means: 17 car, 35 yds, 1 TD

Top receivers

- SEA – Christian Fauria: 4 rec, 60 yds
- SD – Jeff Graham: 6 rec, 92 yds

Team – pass – rush – total – to

- SEA – 140 – 61 – 201 – 1
- SD – 281 – 49 – 330 – 4

==== Week 7: vs. Buffalo Bills ====
Week Seven: Seattle Seahawks vs. Buffalo Bills – Game summary

Quarter	1	2	3	4	Total
Bills	0	3	6	7	16
Seahawks	13	10	0	3	26

at Kingdome, Seattle

- Date: October 24, 1999
- Game time: 1:15 pm local
- Game weather: indoors
- Game attendance: 66,301
- Referee: Tom White
- TV announcers (CBS): Greg Gumbel, Phil Simms, and Armen Keteyian
- Gamebook

Game information

First quarter

- SEA – Derrick Mayes 7-yard pass from Jon Kitna (Todd Peterson kick), 12:30 (SEA 7–0)
- SEA – Todd Peterson 40-yard field goal, 5:47 (SEA 10–0)
- SEA – Todd Peterson 21-yard field goal, 1:39 (SEA 13–0)

Second quarter

- SEA – Derrick Mayes 43-yard pass from Jon Kitna (Todd Peterson kick), 7:36 (SEA 20–0)
- SEA – Todd Peterson 42-yard field goal, 0:17 (SEA 23–0)
- BUF – Steve Christie 50-yard field goal, 0:00 (SEA 23–3)

Third quarter

- BUF – Peerless Price 18-yard pass from Doug Flutie (PAT failed), 1:59 (SEA 23–9)

Fourth quarter

- SEA – Todd Peterson 34-yard field goal, 10:02 (SEA 26–9)
- BUF – Jay Riemersma 1-yard pass from Doug Flutie (Steve Christie kick), 7:32 (SEA 26–16)

Top passers

- BUF – Doug Flutie: 24/50, 294 yds, 2 TD, 2 INT
- SEA – Jon Kitna: 17/30, 276 yds, 2 TD

Top rushers

- BUF – Doug Flutie: 6 car, 43 yds
- SEA – Ricky Watters: 22 car, 75 yds

Top receivers

- BUF – Peerless Price: 5 rec, 106 yds, 1 TD
- SEA – Derrick Mayes: 6 rec, 105 yds, 2 TD

Team – pass – rush – total – to

- BUF – 254 – 98 – 352 – 3
- SEA – 275 – 110 – 385 – 0

==== Week 8: at Green Bay Packers ====
Week Eight: Seattle Seahawks at Green Bay Packers – Game summary

Quarter	1	2	3	4	Total
Seahawks	7	7	7	6	27
Packers	0	7	0	0	7

at Lambeau Field, Green Bay, Wisconsin

- Date: November 1, 1999
- Game time: 8:07 pm local
- Game weather: 47 °F (8 °C), wind NW 18 miles per hour (29 km/h)
- Game attendance: 59,869
- Referee: Ron Blum
- TV announcers (ABC): Al Michaels, Boomer Esiason, and Lesley Visser
- Gamebook

Game information

First quarter

- SEA – Shawn Springs 61-yard blocked field goal return (Todd Peterson kick), 4:45 (SEA 7–0)

Second quarter

- GB – Corey Bradford 74-yard pass from Brett Favre (Ryan Longwell kick), 10:17 (Tied 7–7)
- SEA – Derrick Mayes 10-yard pass from Jon Kitna (Todd Peterson kick), 5:48 (SEA 14–7)

Third quarter

- SEA – Sean Dawkins 2-yard pass from Jon Kitna (Todd Peterson kick), 10:30 (SEA 21–7)

Fourth quarter

- SEA – Todd Peterson 19-yard field goal, 9:11 (SEA 24–7)
- SEA – Todd Peterson 29-yard field goal, 6:36 (SEA 27–7)

Top passers

- SEA – Jon Kitna: 12/19, 109 yds, 2 TD
- GB – Brett Favre: 14/35, 180 yds, 1 TD, 4 INT

Top rushers

- SEA – Ricky Watters: 31 car, 125 yds
- GB – Dorsey Levens: 24 car, 104 yds

Top receivers

- SEA – Derrick Mayes: 4 rec, 36 yds, 1 TD
- GB – Corey Bradford: 3 rec, 106 yds, 1 TD

Team – pass – rush – total – to

- SEA – 90 – 132 – 222 – 2
- GB – 182 – 125 – 307 – 7

Once fellow members of Bill Walsh’s staff on the Forty-Niners, Mike Holmgren faced his former defensive coordinator and now successor as Packers head coach Ray Rhodes. Shawn Springs’ blocked punt touchdown and Corey Bradford’s 74-yard catch opened a 7–7 game that then became a Seahawks rout as Brett Favre was intercepted four times and benched for Matt Hasselbeck. Entering 2023, this was the last time the Seahawks defeated the Packers at Lambeau Field.

==== Week 9: vs. Cincinnati Bengals ====
Week Nine: Seattle Seahawks vs. Cincinnati Bengals – Game summary

Quarter	1	2	3	4	Total
Bengals	10	0	3	7	20
Seahawks	14	14	3	6	37

at Kingdome, Seattle

- Date: November 7, 1999
- Game time: 1:16 pm local
- Game weather: indoors
- Game attendance: 66,303
- Referee: Tony Corrente
- TV announcers (CBS): Don Criqui and Steve Tasker
- Gamebook

Game information

First quarter

- SEA – Ricky Watters 19-yard run (Todd Peterson kick), 12:06 (SEA 7–0)
- CIN – Doug Pelfrey 50-yard field goal, 10:02 (SEA 7–3)
- SEA – Ricky Watters 8-yard pass from Jon Kitna (Todd Peterson kick), 6:36 (SEA 14–3)
- CIN – Carl Pickens 75-yard pass from Jeff Blake (Doug Pelfrey kick), 2:02 (SEA 14–10)

Second quarter

- SEA – Mike Pritchard 20-yard pass from Jon Kitna (Todd Peterson kick), 10:48 (SEA 21–10)
- SEA – Derrick Mayes 10-yard pass from Jon Kitna (Todd Peterson kick), 4:58 (SEA 28–10)

Third quarter

- SEA – Todd Peterson 29-yard field goal, 10:45 (SEA 31–10)
- CIN – Doug Pelfrey 34-yard field goal, 5:38 (SEA 31–13)

Fourth quarter

- SEA – Todd Peterson 45-yard field goal, 12:25 (SEA 34–13)
- CIN – Jeff Blake 1-yard run (Doug Pelfrey kick), 3:53 (SEA 34–20)
- SEA – Todd Peterson 35-yard field goal, 1:30 (SEA 37–20)

Top passers

- CIN – Jeff Blake: 18/35, 287 yds, 1 TD, 2 INT
- SEA – Jon Kitna: 14/24, 202 yds, 3 TD, 2 INT

Top rushers

- CIN – Corey Dillon: 16 car, 81 yds
- SEA – Ricky Watters: 27 car, 133 yds, 1 TD

Top receivers

- CIN – Carl Pickens: 4 rec, 104 yds, 1 TD
- SEA – Mike Pritchard: 3 rec, 61 yds, 1 TD
- SEA – Derrick Mayes: 5 rec, 61 yds, 1 TD

Team – pass – rush – total – to

- CIN – 294 – 103 – 397 – 2
- SEA –187 – 173 – 360 – 2

==== Week 10: vs. Denver Broncos ====
Week Ten: Seattle Seahawks vs. Denver Broncos – Game summary

Quarter	1	2	3	4	Total
Broncos	0	0	17	0	17
Seahawks	3	7	0	10	20

at Kingdome, Seattle

- Date: November 14, 1999
- Game time: 5:21 pm local
- Game weather: indoors
- Game attendance: 66,314
- Referee: Ed Hochuli
- TV announcers (ESPN): Mike Patrick, Joe Theismann, Paul Maguire, and Solomon Wilcots
- Gamebook

Game information

First quarter

- SEA – Todd Peterson 35-yard field goal, 8:27 (SEA 3–0)

Second quarter

- SEA – Derrick Mayes 10-yard pass from Jon Kitna (Todd Peterson kick), 12:52 (SEA 10–0)

Third quarter

- DEN – Jason Elam 35-yard field goal, 11:43 (SEA 10–3)
- DEN – Ed McCaffrey 23-yard pass from Chris Miller (Jason Elam kick), 5:29 (Tied 10–10)
- DEN – Howard Griffith 1-yard pass from Chris Miller (Jason Elam kick), 0:50 (DEN 17–10)

Fourth quarter

- SEA – Todd Peterson 43-yard field goal, 14:20 (DEN 17–13)
- SEA – Sean Dawkins 20-yard pass from Jon Kitna (Todd Peterson kick), 7:19 (SEA 20–17)

Top passers

- DEN – Chris Miller: 20/30, 239 yds, 2 TD, 1 INT
- SEA – Jon Kitna: 16/31, 235 yds, 2 TD, 1 INT

Top rushers

- DEN – Olandis Gary: 26 car, 65 yds
- SEA – Ricky Watters: 17 car, 29 yds

Top receivers

- DEN – Ed McCaffrey: 6 rec, 125 yds, 1 TD
- SEA – Sean Dawkins: 5 rec, 91 yds, 1 TD

Team – pass – rush – total – to

- DEN – 236 – 87 – 323 – 1
- SEA – 230 – 41 – 271 – 2

==== Week 11: at Kansas City Chiefs ====
Week Eleven: Seattle Seahawks at Kansas City Chiefs – Game summary

Quarter	1	2	3	4	Total
Seahawks	0	14	10	7	31
Chiefs	3	10	0	6	19

at Arrowhead Stadium, Kansas City, Missouri

- Date: November 21, 1999
- Game time: 12:01 pm local
- Game weather: clear, 60 °F (16 °C), 51% humidity, wind S 16 miles per hour (26 km/h)
- Game attendance: 78,714
- Referee: Jeff Triplette
- TV announcers (CBS): Kevin Harlan and Sam Wyche
- Gamebook

Game information

First quarter

- KC – Pete Stoyanovich 29-yard field goal, 6:07 (KC 3–0)

Second quarter

- SEA – Ricky Watters 2-yard run (Todd Peterson kick), 10:19 (SEA 7–3)
- KC – Donnell Bennett 1-yard run (Pete Stoyanovich kick), 5:03 (KC 10–7)
- SEA – Ricky Watters 22-yard pass from Jon Kitna (Todd Peterson kick), 1:46 (SEA 14–10)
- KC – Pete Stoyanovich 29-yard field goal, 0:02 (SEA 14–13)

Third quarter

- SEA – Todd Peterson 38-yard field goal, 9:17 (SEA 17–13)
- SEA – Sean Dawkins 45-yard pass from Jon Kitna (Todd Peterson kick), 3:13 (SEA 24–13)

Fourth quarter

- KC – Donnell Bennett 4-yard run (PAT failed), 6:49 (SEA 24–19)
- SEA – Ricky Watters 5-yard run (Todd Peterson kick), 2:43 (SEA 31–19)

Top passers

- SEA – Jon Kitna: 14/33, 235 yds, 2 TD, 1 INT
- KC – Elvis Grbac: 30/49, 320 yds, 1 INT

Top rushers

- SEA – Ricky Watters: 24 car, 107 yds, 2 TD
- KC – Donnell Bennett: 17 car, 60 yds, 2 TD

Top receivers

- SEA – Sean Dawkins: 5 rec, 114 yds, 1 TD
- KC – Derrick Alexander: 8 rec, 101 yds

Team – pass – rush – total – to

- SEA – 235 – 133 – 368 – 2
- KC – 295 – 76 – 371 – 2

==== Week 12: vs. Tampa Bay Buccaneers ====
Week Twelve: Seattle Seahawks vs. Tampa Bay Buccaneers – Game summary

Quarter	1	2	3	4	Total
Buccaneers	0	6	0	10	16
Seahawks	3	0	0	0	3

at Kingdome, Seattle

- Date: November 28, 1999
- Game time: 1:07 pm local
- Game weather: indoors
- Game attendance: 66,314
- Referee: Mike Carey
- TV announcers (Fox): Dick Stockton, Matt Millen, and Pam Oliver
- Gamebook

Game information

First quarter

- SEA – Todd Peterson 25-yard field goal, 10:40 (SEA 3–0)

Second quarter

- TB – Martin Gramatica 42-yard field goal, 14:51 (Tied 3–3)
- TB – Martin Gramatica 40-yard field goal, 1:12 (TB 6–3)

Third quarter

- No scoring plays

Fourth quarter

- TB – Patrick Hape 2-yard pass from Shaun King (Martin Gramatica kick), 12:21 (TB 13–3)
- TB – Martin Gramatica 37-yard field goal, 9:00 (TB 16–3)

Top passers

- TB – Trent Dilfer: 5/11, 50 yds
- SEA – Jon Kitna: 19/44, 197 yds, 5 INT

Top rushers

- TB – Warrick Dunn: 15 car, 57 yds
- SEA – Ricky Watters: 17 car, 64 yds

Top receivers

- TB – Dave Moore: 2 rec, 31 yds
- SEA – Sean Dawkins: 4 rec, 87 yds

Team – pass – rush – total – to

- TB – 51 – 105 – 156 – 0
- SEA – 170 – 89 – 259 – 6

==== Week 13: at Oakland Raiders ====
Week Thirteen: Seattle Seahawks at Oakland Raiders – Game summary

Quarter	1	2	3	4	Total
Seahawks	0	7	7	7	21
Raiders	3	14	7	6	30

at Network Associates Coliseum, Oakland, California

- Date: December 5, 1999
- Game time: 1:15 pm local
- Game weather: partly cloudy, 61 °F (16 °C), 49% humidity, wind NW 5 miles per hour (8.0 km/h)
- Game attendance: 44,716
- Referee: Dick Hantak
- TV announcers (CBS): Greg Gumbel, Phil Simms, and Armen Keteyian
- Gamebook

Game information

First quarter

- OAK – Michael Husted 18-yard field goal, 7:24 (OAK 3–0)

Second quarter

- OAK – Tim Brown 14-yard pass from Rich Gannon (Michael Husted kick), 11:41 (OAK 10–0)
- OAK – Tim Brown 5-yard pass from Rich Gannon (Michael Husted kick), 6:36 (OAK 17–0)
- SEA – Ricky Watters 8-yard run (Todd Peterson kick), 0:31 (OAK 17–7)

Third quarter

- SEA – Joey Galloway 31-yard pass from Jon Kitna (Todd Peterson kick), 10:54 (OAK 17–14)
- OAK – Zack Crockett 1-yard run (Michael Husted kick), 3:31 (OAK 24–14)

Fourth quarter

- OAK – Michael Husted 41-yard field goal, 14:17 (OAK 27–14)
- SEA – Sean Dawkins 3-yard pass from Jon Kitna (Todd Peterson kick), 10:55 (OAK 27–21)
- OAK – Michael Husted 23-yard field goal, 1:53 (OAK 30–21)

Top passers

- SEA – Jon Kitna: 22/39, 245 yds, 2 TD, 2 INT
- OAK – Rich Gannon: 19/24, 253 yds, 2 TD, 1 INT

Top rushers

- SEA – Ricky Watters: 14 car, 51 yds, 1 TD
- OAK – Tyrone Wheatley: 21 car, 80 yds

Top receivers

- SEA – Joey Galloway: 4 rec, 68 yds, 1 TD
- OAK – Tim Brown: 6 rec, 75 yds, 2 TD

Team – pass – rush – total – to

- SEA – 234 – 90 – 324 – 4
- OAK – 253 – 162 – 415 – 1

==== Week 14: vs. San Diego Chargers ====
Week Fourteen: Seattle Seahawks vs. San Diego Chargers – Game summary

Quarter	1	2	3	4	Total
Chargers	10	3	0	6	19
Seahawks	3	6	7	0	16

at Kingdome, Seattle

- Date: December 12, 1999
- Game time: 1:05 pm local
- Game weather: indoors
- Game attendance: 66,318
- Referee: Walt Coleman
- TV announcers (CBS): Kevin Harlan and Sam Wyche
- Gamebook

Game information

First quarter

- SD – Natrone Means 1-yard run (John Carney kick), 11:02 (SD 7–0)
- SEA – Todd Peterson 28-yard field goal, 6:31 (SD 7–3)
- SD – John Carney 33-yard field goal, 1:41 (SD 10–3)

Second quarter

- SEA – Todd Peterson 40-yard field goal, 13:18 (SD 10–6)
- SD – John Carney 42-yard field goal, 6:21 (SD 13–6)
- SEA – Todd Peterson 33-yard field goal, 0:29 (SD 13–9)

Third quarter

- SEA – Derrick Mayes 14-yard pass from Jon Kitna (Todd Peterson kick), 11:20 (SEA 16–13)

Fourth quarter

- SD – John Carney 28-yard field goal, 12:04 (Tied 16–16)
- SD – John Carney 41-yard field goal, 3:19 (SD 19–16)

Top passers

- SD – Jim Harbaugh: 20/35, 229 yds, 1 INT
- SEA – Jon Kitna: 25/40, 285 yds, 1 TD, 1 INT

Top rushers

- SD – Natrone Means: 14 car, 42 yds, 1 TD
- SEA – Ricky Watters: 20 car, 75 yds

Top receivers

- SD – Jeff Graham: 9 rec, 114 yds
- SEA – Joey Galloway: 6 rec, 85 yds

Team – pass – rush – total – to

- SD – 222 – 107 – 329 – 1
- SEA – 271 – 76 – 347 – 2

==== Week 15 at Denver Broncos ====
Week Fifteen: Seattle Seahawks at Denver Broncos – Game summary

Quarter	1	2	3	4	OT	Total
Seahawks	7	7	3	13	0	30
Broncos	14	3	6	7	6	36

at Mile High Stadium, Denver, Colorado

- Date: December 19, 1999
- Game time: 2:15 pm local
- Game weather: cloudy, 27 °F (−3 °C), 51% humidity, wind NE 12 miles per hour (19 km/h)
- Game attendance: 65,987
- Referee: Bob McElwee
- TV announcers (CBS): Ian Eagle & Mark May
- Gamebook

Game information

First quarter

- DEN – Chris Watson 81-yard punt return (Jason Elam kick), 12:51 (DEN 7–0)
- SEA – Mike Pritchard 16-yard pass from Jon Kitna (Todd Peterson kick), 10:43 (Tied 7–7)
- DEN – Rod Smith 14-yard pass from Brian Griese (Jason Elam kick), 5:54 (DEN 14–7)

Second quarter

- DEN – Jason Elam 28-yard field goal, 6:48 (DEN 17–7)
- SEA – Ricky Watters 1-yard run (Todd Peterson kick), 4:07 (DEN 17–14)

Third quarter

- DEN – Jason Elam 46-yard field goal, 9:01 (DEN 20–14)
- SEA – Todd Peterson 40-yard field goal, 5:41 (DEN 20–17)
- DEN – Jason Elam 33-yard field goal, 0:01 (DEN 23–17)

Fourth quarter

- SEA – Todd Peterson 32-yard field goal, 3:41 (DEN 23–20)
- DEN – Dwayne Carswell 9-yard pass from Brian Griese (Jason Elam kick), 1:47 (DEN 30–20)
- SEA – Derrick Mayes 36-yard pass from Jon Kitna (Todd Peterson kick), 0:54 (DEN 30–27)
- SEA – Todd Peterson 45-yard field goal, 0:09 (Tied 30–30)

Overtime

- DEN – Glenn Cadrez 37-yard fumble return, 12:17 (DEN 36–30)

Top passers

- SEA – Jon Kitna: 22/42, 278 yds, 2 TD
- DEN – Brian Griese: 20/39, 180 yds, 2 TD, 2 INT

Top rushers

- SEA – Ricky Watters: 16 car, 115 yds, 1 TD
- DEN – Olandis Gary: 22 car, 183 yds

Top receivers

- SEA – Sean Dawkins: 5 rec, 88 yds
- DEN – Rod Smith: 7 rec, 82 yds, 1 TD

Team – pass – rush – total – to

- SEA – 250 – 114 – 364 – 2
- DEN – 170 – 260 – 430 – 2

The wildest game of the year (66 combined points a season high for both teams) occurred at Mile High Stadium. It was mostly a battle of Jason Elam and Todd Peterson field goals until the final four minutes saw the Seahawks outscore the Broncos 13–7; Seattle’s final ten points came in the final 62 seconds on a touchdown, onside kick, and field goal. In overtime Jon Kitna was strip sacked and Glenn Cadrez scored.

==== Week 16: vs. Kansas City Chiefs ====
Week Sixteen: Seattle Seahawks vs. Kansas City Chiefs – Game summary

Quarter	1	2	3	4	Total
Chiefs	0	7	7	0	14
Seahawks	10	7	6	0	23

at Kingdome, Seattle

- Date: December 26, 1999
- Game time: 1:05 pm local
- Game weather: indoors
- Game attendance: 66,332
- Referee: Bill Carollo
- TV announcers (CBS): Ian Eagle and Mark May
- Gamebook

Game information

First quarter

- SEA – Todd Peterson 31-yard field goal, 9:18 (SEA 3–0)
- SEA – Sean Dawkins 20-yard pass from Jon Kitna (Todd Peterson kick), 2:39 (SEA 10–0)

Second quarter

- SEA – Derrick Mayes 9-yard pass from Jon Kitna (Todd Peterson kick), 6:23 (SEA 17–0)
- KC – Lonnie Johnson 4-yard pass from Elvis Grbac (Pete Stoyanovich kick), 1:14 (SEA 17–7)

Third quarter

- SEA – Todd Peterson 22-yard field goal, 9:35 (SEA 20–7)
- KC – Joe Horn 76-yard pass from Elvis Grbac (Pete Stoyanovich kick), 8:08 (SEA 20–14)
- SEA – Todd Peterson 48-yard field goal, 4:39 (SEA 23–14)

Fourth quarter

- No scoring plays

Top passers

- KC – Elvis Grbac: 22/42, 254 yds, 2 TD, 3 INT
- SEA – Jon Kitna: 18/30, 216 yds, 2 TD

Top rushers

- KC – Bam Morris: 6 car, 33 yds
- SEA – Ricky Watters: 18 car, 63 yds

Top receivers

- KC – Joe Horn: 3 rec, 92 yds, 1 TD
- SEA – Christian Fauria: 6 rec, 84 yds

Team – pass – rush – total – to

- KC – 230 – 72 – 302 – 3
- SEA – 207 – 60 – 267 – 0

==== Week 17: at New York Jets ====
Week Seventeen: Seattle Seahawks at New York Jets – Game summary

Quarter	1	2	3	4	Total
Seahawks	6	0	3	0	9
Jets	3	10	3	3	19

at Giants Stadium, East Rutherford, New Jersey

- Date: January 2, 2000
- Game time: 1:03 pm local
- Game weather: hazy, 52 °F (11 °C), 88% humidity, wind SW 4 miles per hour (6.4 km/h)
- Game attendance: 78,154
- Referee: Johnny Grier
- TV announcers (CBS): Kevin Harlan and Sam Wyche
- Gamebook

Game information

First quarter

- SEA – Todd Peterson 25-yard field goal, 10:30 (SEA 3–0)
- NYJ – John Hall 23-yard field goal, 4:03 (Tied 3–3)
- SEA – Todd Peterson 25-yard field goal, 1:03 (SEA 6–3)

Second quarter

- NYJ – Curtis Martin 1-yard run (John Hall kick), 13:21 (NYJ 10–6)
- NYJ – John Hall 30-yard field goal, 3:40 (NYJ 13–6)

Third quarter

- SEA – Todd Peterson 45-yard field goal, 9:54 (NYJ 13–9)

Fourth quarter

- NYJ – John Hall 31-yard field goal, 6:01 (NYJ 16–9)
- NYJ – John Hall 35-yard field goal, 4:21 (NYJ 19–9)

Top passers

- SEA – Jon Kitna: 21/45, 237 yds, 2 INT
- NYJ – Ray Lucas: 15/26, 211 yds, 2 INT

Top rushers

- SEA – Ricky Watters: 9 car, 30 yds
- NYJ – Curtis Martin: 34 car, 158 yds, 1 TD

Top receivers

- SEA – Sean Dawkins: 4 rec, 66 yds
- NYJ – Wayne Chrebet: 5 rec, 88 yds

Team – pass – rush – total – to

- SEA – 233 – 33 – 266 – 2
- NYJ – 202 – 177 – 379 – 2

Despite the loss, courtesy of the Raiders win over Kansas City, Seattle was still able to clinch what would turn out to be their last AFC West Division title along with the #3 seed in the AFC. This would also be their last Divisional title until 2004, when they've already returned to the NFC West beginning in 2002.

=== Postseason ===
Seattle entered the postseason as the #3 seed in the AFC.

==== AFC Wild Card Playoff: vs. #6 Miami Dolphins ====
AFC Wild Card Playoff: #3 Seattle Seahawks vs #6 Miami Dolphins – Game summary

Quarter	1	2	3	4	Total
Dolphins	3	0	10	7	20
Seahawks	7	3	7	0	17

at Kingdome, Seattle

- Date: January 9, 2000
- Game time: 1:06 pm local
- Game weather: indoors
- Game attendance: 66,170
- Referee: Tony Corrente
- TV announcers (CBS): Greg Gumbel, Phil Simms, and Armen Keteyian
- Gamebook

Game information

First quarter

- SEA – Sean Dawkins 9-yard pass from Jon Kitna (Todd Peterson kick), 6:18 (SEA 7–0)
- MIA – Olindo Mare 32-yard field goal, 2:05 (SEA 7–3)

Second quarter

- SEA – Todd Peterson 50-yard field goal, 0:45 (SEA 10–3)

Third quarter

- MIA – Oronde Gadsden 18-yard pass from Dan Marino (Olindo Mare kick), 8:55 (Tied 10–10)
- SEA – Charlie Rogers 85-yard kickoff return (Todd Peterson kick), 8:37 (SEA 17–10)
- MIA – Olindo Mare 50-yard field goal, 2:22 (SEA 17–13)

Fourth quarter

- MIA – J.J. Johnson 2-yard run (Olindo Mare kick), 4:48 (MIA 20–17)

Top passers

- SEA – Jon Kitna: 17/30, 196 yds, 1 TD
- MIA – Dan Marino: 14/30, 162 yds, 1 TD, 2 INT

Top rushers

- SEA – Ricky Watters: 27 car, 86 yds, 1 TD
- MIA – J.J. Johnson: 19 car, 40 yds

Top receivers

- SEA – Sean Dawkins: 5 rec, 82 yds
- MIA – O. J. McDuffie: 3 rec, 35 yds, 1 TD

Team – pass – rush – total – to

- SEA – 191 – 108 – 299 – 0
- MIA – 130 – 41 – 171 – 2

In what was the final game played at the Kingdome, the Seahawks lost to Dan Marino and the Dolphins, giving up the lead with just under 5 minutes to play. This was Marino's final playoff win in his career, and the final playoff game for Seattle as an AFC team.
