= Beede =

The surname Beede may refer to:

- Dike Beede (1903–1972), American college football coach
- Tyler Beede (born 1993), American baseball pitcher for the San Francisco Giants
- Frank Beede (born 1973), former professional American football player, now a history teacher and football coach
- Alpheus Beede Stickney (1840–1916), American railroad company president
