= Tim Watson (disambiguation) =

Tim Watson is a former Australian rules footballer.

Tim or Timothy Watson may also refer to:

== Music ==
- Tim Watson (musician) (born 1971), Australian pop and rock singer
- Timothy Watson, Australian songwriter (APRA Music Awards of 2003#APRA Music Awards)

== Sports ==
- Tim Watson (safety) (born 1970), American football player
- Tim Watson (defensive tackle) (born 1974), American football player

== Other ==
- Timothy Watson, English actor; in films and TV since 1987
- Timothy Watson, English Leeds Left Alliance politician (2000 Leeds City Council election#Ward results)
