= 1995 Pittsburgh Steelers season =

Pittsburgh Steelers 63rd US football season

- Owner: The Rooney Family
- General manager: Tom Donahoe
- Head coach: Bill Cowher
- Offensive coordinator: Ron Erhardt
- Defensive coordinator: Dick LeBeau
- Home stadium: Three Rivers Stadium

Results
- Record: 11–5
- Division place: 1st AFC Central
- Playoffs: Won Divisional Playoffs (vs. Bills) 40–21; Won AFC Championship (vs. Colts) 20–16; Lost Super Bowl XXX (vs. Cowboys) 17–27
- All-Pros: 3: Dermontti Dawson (1st team); Greg Lloyd (1st team); Carnell Lake (2nd team)
- Pro Bowlers: 5: C Dermontti Dawson; OLB Kevin Greene; SS Carnell Lake; OLB Greg Lloyd; WR Yancey Thigpen
- Team MVP: Neil O'Donnell
- Team ROY: Kordell Stewart

The 1995 Pittsburgh Steelers season was the franchise's 63rd season as a professional sports franchise and as a member of the National Football League (NFL).

This season saw the Steelers return to the Super Bowl for the first time in sixteen years (Super Bowl XIV). The team's 11–5 finish was good enough for the AFC Central championship and the second seed in the conference.

For the second consecutive season, Pittsburgh hosted the AFC Championship game, by virtue of the Indianapolis Colts' upset of the top-seeded Kansas City Chiefs at Arrowhead Stadium. The Steelers won the conference championship game, but lost to the Dallas Cowboys in the Super Bowl in a matchup of teams that were looking to join the San Francisco 49ers as the only other team (at the time) to win five Super Bowls. It was the first time in three Super Bowl meetings that the Steelers had lost to the Cowboys, and also their first Super Bowl loss overall. Pittsburgh coach Bill Cowher became (at the time) the youngest head coach to lead his team to the Super Bowl.

After the Super Bowl loss, quarterback Neil O'Donnell signed as a free agent with the New York Jets. The Steelers would not return to the Super Bowl until ten years later.

As of 2025, this is the last time the Steelers defeated the Bears in Chicago.

== Offseason ==
Additions	Subtractions
P Rohn Stark (Colts)	WR Dwight Stone (Panthers)
CB Alvoid Mays (Redskins)	RB Barry Foster (Panthers)
CB Chris Oldham (Cardinals)	P Mark Royals (Lions)
G Tom Newberry (Rams)	DE Gerald Williams (Panthers)
K Norm Johnson (Falcons)	T Duval Love (Cardinals)

=== 1995 expansion draft ===
Pittsburgh Steelers selected during the expansion draft
Round	Selection	Name	Position	Expansion team
6	12	Tim McKyer	Cornerback	Carolina Panthers
15	30	Fred Foggie	Defensive back	Carolina Panthers
19	37	Charles Davenport	Wide receiver	Jacksonville Jaguars

=== NFL draft ===
1995 Pittsburgh Steelers draft
Round	Pick	Player	Position	College	Notes
1	27	Mark Bruener	Tight end	Washington	
2	60	Kordell Stewart *	Quarterback	Colorado	
3	91	Brenden Stai	Guard	Nebraska	
4	120	Oliver Gibson	Defensive tackle	Notre Dame	From New England
4	125	Donta Jones	Linebacker	Nebraska	
5	151	Lethon Flowers	Safety	Georgia Tech	From Chicago
5	161	Lance Brown	Safety	Indiana	
6	199	Barron Miles	Cornerback	Nebraska	
7	235	Henry Bailey	Wide receiver	UNLV	
7	247	Cole Ford	Placekicker	USC	
Made roster * Made at least one Pro Bowl during career

=== Undrafted free agents ===
1995 undrafted free agents of note
Player	Position	College
Greg Black	Defensive tackle	North Carolina
LaMonte Coleman	Fullback	Slippery Rock
Vincent Dinkins	Center	South Carolina
Joey Ellis	Cornerback	Texas
Doug Grant	Wide receiver	Savannah State
Tirrell Greene	Guard	Miami (FL)
Germaine Holden	Defensive end	Notre Dame
Tim Patillo	Safety	Ohio State
Kiefer Phillips	Linebacker	Grambling State
Ty Stewart	Kicker	Iowa State

== Personnel ==
=== Coaches / Staff ===
1995 Pittsburgh Steelers staff
Front office: President – Daniel M. Rooney; Vice president – John R. McGinley; Vice president – Arthur J. Rooney, Jr.; Secretary & counsel – Arthur J. Rooney II; Administration advisor – Chuck Noll; Director of communications – Joe Gordon; Media relations coordinator – Rob Boulware; PR Assistant/Community Relations – Ron Miller; Entertainment manager – Lynne Balkovec Molyneaux; Controller – Mike Hagan; Assistant controller – Dan Ferens; Assistant controller – Jim Ellenberger; Ticket sales manager – Geraldine Glenn; Merchandising manager – Tim Carey; Football operations; Director of football operations – Tom Donahoe; Scouting staff; College personnel coordinator – Tom Modrak; Pro personnel coordinator – Charles Bailey; BLESTO College Scout – Mark Gorscak; College scout – Phil Kreidler; College scout – Bob Lane; College scout – Max McCartney; Head coaches: Head coach – Bill Cowher; Offensive coaches: Offensive coordinator – Ron Erhardt; Running backs – Dick Hoak; Wide receivers – Chan Gailey; Tight ends – Pat Hodgson; Offensive line – Kent Stephenson	Defensive coaches: Defensive coordinator – Dick LeBeau; Defensive line – John Mitchell; Linebackers – Marvin Lewis; Defensive backs – Tim Lewis; Special teams coaches: Special teams – Bobby April; Strength and conditioning: Conditioning coordinator – Chet Fuhrman; Medical staff; Ophthalmologist – Dr. Randy Beatty; Physician, orthopedic – Dr. James P. Bradley; Neurological surgery consultant – Dr. Joseph Maroon; Physician, M.D. – Dr. Richard Rydze; Physician, consultant – Dr. Abraham J. Twerski; Physician, M.D. – Dr. Anthony P. Yates; Training staff; Head trainer – John Norwig; Assistant trainer – Rick Burkholder; Equipment manager – Anthony Parisi; Field manager – Rodgers Freyvogel; Field assistant – Rich Baker; Video coordinator – Bob McCartney; Video assistant – Pat Dolan; Player development coordinator – Anthony Griggs; Administrative assistant – Lou Spanos; Photographers – Mike Fabus, Bill Amatucci

=== Final roster ===
1995 Pittsburgh Steelers roster
Quarterbacks (QB): 16 Jim Miller; 14 Neil O'Donnell; 18 Mike Tomczak; Running backs (RB): 43 Steve Avery; 34 Tim Lester; 25 Fred McAfee; 33 Bam Morris; 20 Erric Pegram; 22 John L. Williams FB; Wide receivers (WR): 88 Andre Hastings PR; 83 Corey Holliday; 89 Ernie Mills KR; 10 Kordell Stewart; 82 Yancey Thigpen; Tight ends (TE): 87 Mark Bruener; 84 Tracy Greene; 85 Jonathan Hayes	Offensive linemen (OL): 63 Dermontti Dawson C; 65 John Jackson T; 66 Tom Newberry G; 79 James Parrish T; 72 Leon Searcy T; 69 Ariel Solomon C; 68 Brenden Stai G; 73 Justin Strzelczyk G/T; Defensive linemen (DL): 96 Brentson Buckner DE; 78 Ta'ase Faumui DE; 98 Oliver Gibson NT; 76 Kevin Henry DE; 90 Bill Johnson DE; 97 Ray Seals DE; 93 Joel Steed NT	Linebackers (LB): 94 Chad Brown ILB; 92 Jason Gildon OLB; 91 Kevin Greene OLB; 54 Donta Jones OLB; 99 Levon Kirkland ILB; 95 Greg Lloyd OLB; 55 Jerry Olsavsky ILB; 57 Eric Ravotti OLB; Defensive backs (DB): 40 Myron Bell SS; 21 Deon Figures CB; 41 Lethon Flowers FS; 29 Randy Fuller CB; 37 Carnell Lake CB/S; 28 Alvoid Mays CB; 24 Chris Oldham CB; 39 Darren Perry FS; 27 Willie Williams CB; 26 Rod Woodson CB; Special teams (ST): 60 Kendall Gammon LS; 9 Norm Johnson K; 3 Rohn Stark	Practice squad: 19 Henry Bailey WR; 35 LaMonte Coleman RB; 74 Emerson Martin G; 48 A. J. Ofodile TE; Reserve: 80 Johnnie Barnes WR (IR); 81 Charles Johnson WR (IR); 86 Damon Mays WR (IR); 49 Barron Miles CB (IR); Rookies in italics 53 active, 4 reserve, 4 practice squad

== Preseason ==
=== Schedule ===
Week	Date	Opponent	Result	Record	Venue
1	August 4	at Buffalo Bills	W 31–10	1–0	Rich Stadium
2	August 13	Green Bay Packers	L 13–36	1–1	Three Rivers Stadium
3	August 19	at Tampa Bay Buccaneers	L 7–20	1–2	Tampa Stadium
4	August 24	Philadelphia Eagles	L 6–16	1–3	Three Rivers Stadium

== Regular season ==
=== Schedule ===
Week	Date	Opponent	Result	Record	Venue
1	September 3	Detroit Lions	**W** 23–20	1–0	Three Rivers Stadium
2	September 10	at **Houston Oilers**	**W** 34–17	2–0	Astrodome
3	September 18	at Miami Dolphins	**L** 10–23	2–1	Joe Robbie Stadium
4	September 24	Minnesota Vikings	**L** 24–44	2–2	Three Rivers Stadium
5	October 1	San Diego Chargers	**W** 31–16	3–2	Three Rivers Stadium
6	October 8	at **Jacksonville Jaguars**	**L** 16–20	3–3	Jacksonville Municipal Stadium
7	Bye				
8	October 19	**Cincinnati Bengals**	**L** 9–27	3–4	Three Rivers Stadium
9	October 29	**Jacksonville Jaguars**	**W** 24–7	4–4	Three Rivers Stadium
10	November 5	at Chicago Bears	**W** 37–34 (OT)	5–4	Soldier Field
11	November 13	**Cleveland Browns**	**W** 20–3	6–4	Three Rivers Stadium
12	November 19	at **Cincinnati Bengals**	**W** 49–31	7–4	Riverfront Stadium
13	November 26	at **Cleveland Browns**	**W** 20–17	8–4	Cleveland Municipal Stadium
14	December 3	**Houston Oilers**	**W** 21–7	9–4	Three Rivers Stadium
15	December 10	at Oakland Raiders	**W** 29–10	10–4	Oakland–Alameda County Coliseum
16	December 16	New England Patriots	**W** 41–27	11–4	Three Rivers Stadium
17	December 24	at Green Bay Packers	**L** 19–24	11–5	Lambeau Field
Note: Intra-division opponents are in **bold** text.

=== Standings ===
AFC Central
	W	L	T	PCT	PF	PA	STK
^{(2)} Pittsburgh Steelers	11	5	0	.688	407	327	L1
Cincinnati Bengals	7	9	0	.438	349	374	W1
Houston Oilers	7	9	0	.438	348	324	W2
Cleveland Browns	5	11	0	.313	289	356	L1
Jacksonville Jaguars	4	12	0	.250	275	404	W1

=== Game summaries ===
==== Week 1 (Sunday September 3, 1995): vs. Detroit Lions ====
	1	2	3	4	Total
Lions	0	10	0	10	**20**
**Steelers**	3	3	7	10	**23**

at Three Rivers Stadium, Pittsburgh, Pennsylvania

- Game time: 1:00 pm EDT
- Game weather: 78 °F (26 °C) (Sunny)
- Game attendance: 58,002
- Referee: Tom White
- TV announcers: (FOX) Kevin Harlan (play by play), Jerry Glanville (color commentator)

Scoring drives:

- Pittsburgh – FG Johnson 39
- Pittsburgh – FG Johnson 47
- Detroit – Perriman 5 pass from Mitchell (Hanson kick)
- Detroit – FG Hanson 43
- Pittsburgh – Morris 5 run (Johnson kick)
- Pittsburgh – Morris 1 run (Johnson kick)
- Detroit – Moore 27 pass from Mitchell (Hanson kick)
- Detroit – FG Hanson 36
- Pittsburgh – FG Johnson 31

==== Week 2 (Sunday September 10, 1995): at Houston Oilers ====
	1	2	3	4	Total
**Steelers**	14	3	7	10	**34**
Oilers	3	0	7	7	**17**

at Astrodome, Houston, Texas

- Game time: 1:00 pm EDT
- Game weather: Dome
- Game attendance: 44,122
- Referee: Bob McElwee
- TV announcers: (NBC) Dan Hicks (play by play), Tunch Ilkin (color commentator)

Scoring drives:

- Pittsburgh – Hastings 72 punt return (Johnson kick)
- Houston – FG Del Greco 43
- Pittsburgh – Bruener 15 pass from Tomczak (Johnson kick)
- Pittsburgh – FG Johnson 43
- Pittsburgh – McAfee 22 run (Johnson kick)
- Houston – Chandler 1 run (Del Greco kick)
- Pittsburgh – Lake 32 interception return (Johnson kick)
- Houston – Thomas 6 run (Del Greco kick)
- Pittsburgh – FG Johnson 40

==== Week 3 (Monday September 18, 1995): at Miami Dolphins ====
	1	2	3	4	Total
Steelers	0	3	0	7	**10**
**Dolphins**	3	14	3	3	**23**

at Joe Robbie Stadium, Miami, Florida

- Game time: 9:00 pm EDT
- Game weather:
- Game attendance: 72,874
- Referee: Larry Nemmers
- TV announcers: (ABC) Al Michaels (play by play), Frank Gifford & Dan Dierdorf (color commentators), Lynn Swann (sideline reporter)

Scoring drives:

- Miami – FG Stoyanovich 37
- Miami – Parmalee 2 run (Stoyanovich kick)
- Pittsburgh – FG Johnson 40
- Miami – Kirby 28 pass from Marino (Stoyanovich kick)
- Miami – FG Stoyanovich 39
- Miami – FG Stoyanovich 21
- Pittsburgh – Mills 27 pass form Miller (Johnson kick)

==== Week 4 (Sunday September 24, 1995): vs. Minnesota Vikings ====
	1	2	3	4	Total
**Vikings**	0	13	24	7	**44**
Steelers	0	6	0	18	**24**

at Three Rivers Stadium, Pittsburgh, Pennsylvania

- Game time: 1:00 pm EDT
- Game weather: 63 °F (17 °C) (Partly Cloudy)
- Game attendance: 57,853
- Referee: Gordon McCarter
- TV announcers: (FOX) Kenny Albert (play by play), Anthony Muñoz (color commentator)

Scoring drives:

- Pittsburgh – FG Johnson 32
- Minnesota – R. Smith 58 run (Reveiz kick)
- Minnesota – FG Reveiz 33
- Pittsburgh – FG Johnson 35
- Minnesota – Fuller 12 fumble return (Reveiz kick)
- Minnesota – Carter 18 pass from Moon (Reveiz kick)
- Minnesota – Thomas 45 lateral from Del Rio (Reveiz kick)
- Minnesota – FG Reveiz 40
- Pittsburgh – Pegram 5 run (run failed)
- Pittsburgh – Thigpen 42 pass from Miller (pass failed)
- Minnesota – Carter 22 pass from Moon (Reveiz kick)
- Pittsburgh – Pegram 1 run (run failed)

==== Week 5 (Sunday October 1, 1995): vs. San Diego Chargers ====
	1	2	3	4	Total
Chargers	0	6	7	3	**16**
**Steelers**	21	10	0	0	**31**

at Three Rivers Stadium, Pittsburgh, Pennsylvania

- Game time: 4:00 pm EDT
- Game weather: 77 °F (25 °C) (Sunny)
- Game attendance: 57,012
- Referee: Gerald Austin
- TV announcers: (NBC) Dick Enberg (play by play), Phil Simms & Paul Maguire (color commentators)

Scoring drives:

- Pittsburgh – Morris 1 run (Johnson kick)
- Pittsburgh – W. Williams 63 interception return (Johnson kick)
- Pittsburgh – Mays 32 interception return (Johnson kick)
- Pittsburgh – FG Johnson 25
- San Diego – Means 13 run (pass failed)
- Pittsburgh – Morris 2 run (Johnson kick)
- San Diego – Martin 19 pass from Humphries (Carney kick)
- San Diego – FG Carney 28

==== Week 6 (Sunday October 8, 1995): at Jacksonville Jaguars ====
	1	2	3	4	Total
Steelers	0	7	6	3	**16**
**Jaguars**	7	10	3	0	**20**

at Alltell Stadium, Jacksonville, Florida

- Game time: 1:00 pm EDT
- Game weather:
- Game attendance: 72,042
- Referee: Mike Carey
- TV announcers: (NBC) Don Criqui (play by play), Beasley Reece (color commentator)

Scoring drives:

- Jacksonville – Tillman 10 pass from Brunell (Hollis kick)
- Jacksonville – Stewart 6 run (Hollis kick)
- Pittsburgh – Avery 18 pass from O'Donnell (Johnson kick)
- Jacksonville – FG Hollis 53
- Pittsburgh – FG Johnson 41
- Jacksonville – FG Hollis 32
- Pittsburgh – FG Johnson 19
- Pittsburgh – FG Johnson 22

==== Week 8 (Thursday October 19, 1995): vs. Cincinnati Bengals ====
	1	2	3	4	Total
**Bengals**	0	10	14	3	**27**
Steelers	0	3	3	3	**9**

at Three Rivers Stadium, Pittsburgh, Pennsylvania

- Game time: 8:00 pm EDT
- Game weather: 63 °F (17 °C) (Clear)
- Game attendance: 56,684
- Referee: Gary Lane
- TV announcers: (TNT) Verne Lundquist (play by play), Pat Haden (color commentator), Craig Sager (sideline reporter)

Scoring drives:

- Cincinnati – Scott 47 pass from Blake (Pelfrey kick)
- Pittsburgh – FG Johnson 25
- Cincinnati – FG Pelfrey 31
- Cincinnati – To. McGee 12 pass from Blake (Pelfrey kick)
- Pittsburgh – FG Johnson 28
- Cincinnati – Pickens 41 pass from Blake (Pelfrey kick)
- Pittsburgh – FG N. Johnson 38
- Cincinnati – FG Pelfrey 23
- Pittsburgh – O'Donnell To Thigpen 60 yard touchdown

==== Week 9 (Sunday October 29, 1995): vs. Jacksonville Jaguars ====
	1	2	3	4	Total
Jaguars	0	0	7	0	**7**
**Steelers**	7	14	0	3	**24**

at Three Rivers Stadium, Pittsburgh, Pennsylvania

- Game time: 1:00 pm EST
- Game weather: 48 °F (9 °C) (Partly Cloudy)
- Game attendance: 54,516
- Referee: Tom White
- TV announcers: (NBC) Don Criqui (play by play), Beasley Reece (color commentator)

Scoring drives:

- Pittsburgh – Pegram 6 run (Johnson kick)
- Pittsburgh – Thigpen 15 pass from O'Donnell (Johnson kick)
- Pittsburgh – Williams 6 pass from O'Donnell (Johnson kick)
- Jacksonville – Mitchell 16 pass from Brunell (Hollis kick)
- Pittsburgh – FG Johnson 36

==== Week 10 (Sunday November 5, 1995): at Chicago Bears ====
	1	2	3	4	OT	Total
**Steelers**	0	17	3	14	3	**37**
Bears	3	7	14	10	0	**34**

at Soldier Field, Chicago, Illinois

- Game time: 4:00 pm EST
- Game weather:
- Game attendance: 61,838
- Referee: Howard Roe
- TV announcers: (NBC) Dick Enberg (play by play), Phil Simms & Paul Maguire (color commentators)

Scoring drives:

- Chicago – FG Butler 40
- Pittsburgh – Pegram 1 run (Johnson kick)
- Chicago – Conway 6 pass from Kramer (Butler kick)
- Pittsburgh – FG Johnson 40
- Pittsburgh – Pegram 7 pass from O'Donnell (Johnson kick)
- Chicago – Carter 12 pass from Kramer (Butler kick)
- Chicago – Wetnight 14 pass from Kramer (Butler kick)
- Pittsburgh – FG Johnson 46
- Chicago – FG Butler 27
- Pittsburgh – Pegram 6 run (Johnson kick)
- Chicago – Minter 2 interception return (Johnson kick)
- Pittsburgh – Mills 11 pass form O'Donnell (Johnson kick)
- Pittsburgh – FG Johnson 24

With the win, the Steelers recorded their first-ever road victory in Chicago, ending a 10-game road losing streak to the Bears. As of 2025, this remains their only win in Chicago.

==== Week 11 (Monday November 13, 1995): vs. Cleveland Browns ====
	1	2	3	4	Total
Browns	0	3	0	0	**3**
**Steelers**	0	7	6	7	**20**

at Three Rivers Stadium, Pittsburgh, Pennsylvania

- Game time: 9:00 pm EST
- Game weather: 34 °F (1 °C) (Fog)
- Game attendance: 58,675
- Referee: Ron Blum
- TV announcers: (ABC) Al Michaels (play by play), Frank Gifford & Dan Dierdorf (color commentators), Lynn Swann (sideline reporter)

Scoring drives:

- Pittsburgh – Mills 2 pass from Stewart (Johnson kick)
- Cleveland – FG Stover 29
- Pittsburgh – FG Johnson 38
- Pittsburgh – FG Johnson 34
- Pittsburgh – Thigpen 9 pass from O'Donnell (Johnson kick)

==== Week 12 (Sunday November 19, 1995): at Cincinnati Bengals ====
	1	2	3	4	Total
**Steelers**	3	10	15	21	**49**
Bengals	14	10	7	0	**31**

at Riverfront Stadium, Cincinnati, Ohio

- Game time: 1:00 pm EST
- Game weather:
- Game attendance: 54,636
- Referee: Bob McElwee
- TV announcers: (NBC) Dick Enberg (play by play), Phil Simms & Paul Maguire (color commentators)

Scoring drives:

- Cincinnati – Scott 4 pass from Blake (Pelfrey kick)
- Pittsburgh – FG Johnson 50
- Cincinnati – Blake 1 run (Pelfrey kick)
- Cincinnati – Pickens 1 pass from Blake (Pelfrey kick)
- Pittsburgh – Mills 42 pass from O'Donnell (Johnson kick)
- Cincinnati – FG Pelfrey 27
- Pittsburgh – FG Johnson 26
- Cincinnati – McGee 20 pass from Blake (Pelfrey kick)
- Pittsburgh – Morris 1 run (Johnson kick)
- Pittsburgh – Hastings 15 pass from O'Donnell (Pegram run)
- Pittsburgh – Stewart 71 pass from O'Donnell (Johnson kick)
- Pittsburgh – Morris 3 run (Johnson kick)
- Pittsburgh – Morris 8 run (Johnson kick)

==== Week 13 (Sunday November 26, 1995): at Cleveland Browns ====
	1	2	3	4	Total
**Steelers**	10	7	0	3	**20**
Browns	0	10	7	0	**17**

at Cleveland Municipal Stadium, Cleveland, Ohio

- Game time: 4:00 pm EST
- Game weather:
- Game attendance: 67,269
- Referee: Dick Hantak
- TV announcers: (NBC) Marv Albert (play by play), Phil Simms & Paul Maguire (color commentators)

Scoring drives:

- Pittsburgh – FG Johnson 33
- Pittsburgh – Bruener 12 pass from O'Donnell (Johnson kick)
- Cleveland – FG Stover 44
- Pittsburgh – Morris 1 run (Johnson kick)
- Cleveland – Jackson 11 pass from Testaverde (Stover kick)
- Cleveland – Testaverde 1 run (Stover kick)
- Pittsburgh – FG Johnson 27

==== Week 14 (Sunday December 3, 1995): vs. Houston Oilers ====
	1	2	3	4	Total
Oilers	0	7	0	0	**7**
**Steelers**	7	7	0	7	**21**

at Three Rivers Stadium, Pittsburgh, Pennsylvania

- Game time: 1:00 pm EST
- Game weather: 52 °F (11 °C) (Light Rain)
- Game attendance: 56,013
- Referee: Red Cashion
- TV announcers: (NBC) Marv Albert (play by play), Cris Collinsworth (color commentator)

Scoring drives:

- PIttsburgh – Thigpen 33 pass from O'Donnell (Johnson kick)
- Houston – Sanders 76 pass from Chandler (Del Greco kick)
- Pittsburgh – Bruener 7 pass from O'Donnell (Johnson kick)
- Pittsburgh – Morris 30 run (Johnson kick)

==== Week 15 (Sunday December 10, 1995): at Oakland Raiders ====
	1	2	3	4	Total
**Steelers**	7	13	3	6	**29**
Raiders	0	7	3	0	**10**

at Oakland–Alameda County Coliseum, Oakland, California

- Game time: 4:00 pm EST
- Game weather:
- Game attendance: 53,516
- Referee: Larry Nemmers
- TV announcers: (NBC) Dick Enberg (play by play), Phil Simms & Paul Maguire (color commentators)

Scoring drives:

- Pittsburgh – Mills 37 pass from O'Donnell (Johnson kick)
- Pittsburgh – FG Johnson 41
- Oakland – Bruce 1 interception return (Jaeger kick)
- Pittsburgh – FG Johnson 35
- Pittsburgh – Mills 14 pass from O'Donnell (Johnson kick)
- Oakland – FG Jaeger 39
- Pittsburgh – FG Johnson 32
- Pittsburgh – FG Johnson 20
- Pittsburgh – FG Johnson 22

The Steelers would not win another road game against the Raiders until 2023.

==== Week 16 (Saturday December 16, 1995): vs. New England Patriots ====
	1	2	3	4	Total
Patriots	3	3	6	15	**27**
**Steelers**	17	7	17	0	**41**

at Three Rivers Stadium, Pittsburgh, Pennsylvania

- Game time: 12:30 pm EST
- Game weather: 38 °F (3 °C) (Sunny)
- Game attendance: 57,158
- Referee: Bernie Kukar
- TV announcers: (NBC) Tom Hammond (play by play), Bob Trumpy (color commentator)

Scoring drives:

- New England – FG Bahr 23
- Pittsburgh – FG Johnson 32
- New England – FG Bahr 22
- Pittsburgh – Thigpen 14 pass from O'Donnell (Johnson kick)
- Pittsburgh – Buckner 46 fumble return (Johnson kick)
- New England – Coates 6 pass from Bledsoe (run failed)
- Pittsburgh – Stewart 22 run (Johnson kick)
- New England – Coates 6 pass from Bledsoe (run failed)
- Pittsburgh – FG Johnson 32
- New England – Martin 22 pass from Bledsoe (Meggett pass from Bledsoe)
- Pittsburgh – Mills 62 pass from O'Donnell (Johnson kick)
- Pittsburgh – Oldham 23 fumble return (Johnson kick)

==== Week 17 (Sunday December 24, 1995): at Green Bay Packers ====
	1	2	3	4	Total
Steelers	0	10	3	6	**19**
**Packers**	0	14	7	3	**24**

at Lambeau Field, Green Bay, Wisconsin

- Game time: 1:00 pm EST
- Game weather:
- Game attendance: 60,649
- Referee: Jerry Markbreit
- TV announcers: (NBC) Charlie Jones (play by play), Randy Cross (color commentator)

Scoring drives:

- Green Bay – Bennett 9 run (Jacke kick)
- Pittsburgh – FG Johnson 33
- Green Bay – Brooks 19 pass from Favre (Jacke kick)
- Pittsburgh – Mills 8 pass from O'Donnell (Johnson kick)
- Green Bay – Chmura 1 pass from Favre (Jacke kick)
- Pittsburgh – FG Johnson 25
- Green Bay – FG Jacke 47
- Pittsburgh – Lester 2 run (pass failed)

== Playoffs ==
=== Game summaries ===
==== AFC Divisional Playoff (Saturday January 6, 1996): vs. Buffalo Bills ====
	1	2	3	4	Total
Bills	0	7	7	7	21
Steelers	7	16	3	14	40

at Three Rivers Stadium, Pittsburgh, Pennsylvania

- Game time: 12:30 pm EST
- Game weather: 18 °F (−8 °C) (Cloudy)
- Game attendance: 59,072
- Referee: Larry Nemmers
- TV announcers: (NBC) Marv Albert (play by play), Cris Collinsworth (color commentator), Jim Gray (sideline reporter)

Scoring drives:

- Pittsburgh – Williams 1 run (Johnson kick)
- Pittsburgh – Mills 10 pass form O'Donnell (Johnson kick)
- Pittsburgh – FG Johnson 45
- Pittsburgh – FG Johnson 38
- Buffalo – Thomas 1 run (Christie kick)
- Pittsburgh – FG Johnson 34
- Pittsburgh – FG Johnson 39
- Buffalo – Cline 2 pass from Van Pelt (Christie kick)
- Buffalo – Thomas 9 pass from Kelly (Christie kick)
- Pittsburgh – Morris 13 run (Johnson kick)
- Pittsburgh – Morris 2 run (Johnson kick)

==== AFC Championship game (Sunday January 14, 1996): vs. Indianapolis Colts ====
	1	2	3	4	Total
Colts	3	3	3	7	16
Steelers	3	7	3	7	20

at Three Rivers Stadium, Pittsburgh, Pennsylvania

- Game time: 12:30 pm EST
- Game weather: 44 °F (7 °C) (Sunny)
- Game attendance: 61,062
- Referee: Bernie Kukar
- TV announcers: (NBC) Dick Enberg (play by play), Phil Simms & Paul Maguire (color commentators), Jim Gray & Will McDonough (sideline reporters)

Scoring drives:

- Indianapolis – FG Blanchard 34
- Pittsburgh – FG Johnson 31
- Indianapolis – FG Blanchard 36
- Pittsburgh – Stewart 5 pass from O'Donnell (Johnson kick)
- Indianapolis – FG Blanchard 37
- Pittsburgh – FG Johnson 36
- Indianapolis – Turner 47 pass from Harbaugh (Blanchard kick)
- Pittsburgh – Morris 1 run (Johnson kick)

==== Super Bowl XXX (Sunday January 28, 1996): vs. Dallas Cowboys ====
	1	2	3	4	Total
Cowboys	10	3	7	7	27
Steelers	0	7	0	10	17

at Sun Devil Stadium, Tempe, Arizona

- Game time: 6:20 pm EST/4:20 pm PST
- Game weather: 68 °F (20 °C) (Sunny)
- Game attendance: 76,347
- Referee: Red Cashion
- TV announcers: (NBC) Dick Enberg (play by play), Phil Simms & Paul Maguire (color commentators), Jim Gray & Will McDonough (sideline reporters)

Scoring drives:

- Dallas – FG Boniol 42
- Dallas – Novacek 3 pass from Aikman (Boniol kick)
- Dallas – FG Boniol 35
- Pittsburgh – Thigpen 6 pass from O'Donnell (Johnson kick)
- Dallas – E. Smith 1 run (Boniol kick)
- Pittsburgh – FG N. Johnson
- Pittsburgh – Morris 1 run (Johnson kick)
- Dallas – E. Smith 4 run (Boniol kick)

== Honors and awards ==
=== Pro Bowl Representatives ===
See: 1996 Pro Bowl

- No. 37 Carnell Lake-Cornerback/Safety
- No. 63 Dermontti Dawson-Center
- No. 82 Yancey Thigpen-Wide Receiver
- No. 91 Kevin Greene-Outside Linebacker
- No. 95 Greg Lloyd-Outside Linebacker
