= Brent McClanahan =

American football player (born 1952)

No. 33
- Position: Running back

Personal information
- Born: September 21, 1951 (age 75); Bakersfield, California, U.S.
- Listed height: 5 ft 10 in (1.78 m)
- Listed weight: 202 lb (92 kg)

Career information
- High school: South (CA)
- College: Arizona State
- NFL draft: 1973: 5th round, 118th overall pick

Career history
- Minnesota Vikings (1973–1979)

Career NFL statistics
- Rushing attempts: 367
- Rushing yards: 1,207
- Rushing touchdowns: 6
- Stats at Pro Football Reference

Brent McClanahan (born September 21, 1952) is an American former professional football player who was a running back for seven seasons with the Minnesota Vikings of the National Football League (NFL). He played college football for the Arizona State Sun Devils. After his playing career, he became a teacher.

== Career ==
Brent McClanahan played for the Minnesota Vikings, until his retirement. His contract was cut short because of injuries. His jersey number was #33.

== NFL career statistics ==
Legend
**Bold**	Career high

=== Regular season ===
Year	Team	Games		Rushing					Receiving				
Year	Team	GP	GS	Att	Yds	Avg	Lng	TD	Rec	Yds	Avg	Lng	TD
1973	MIN	13	0	17	69	4.1	10	0	0	0	0.0	0	0
1974	MIN	14	0	9	41	**4.6**	14	1	3	35	**11.7**	17	0
1975	MIN	12	3	92	336	3.7	15	0	18	141	7.8	**38**	1
1976	MIN	13	13	**130**	**382**	2.9	19	**4**	**40**	252	6.3	23	1
1977	MIN	14	**14**	95	324	3.4	18	1	34	**276**	8.1	23	**2**
1978	MIN	13	0	10	26	2.6	**22**	0	2	11	5.5	7	0
1979	MIN	**16**	0	14	29	2.1	9	0	10	57	5.7	9	0
		95	30	367	1,207	3.3	22	6	107	772	7.2	38	4

=== Playoffs ===
Year	Team	Games		Rushing					Receiving				
Year	Team	GP	GS	Att	Yds	Avg	Lng	TD	Rec	Yds	Avg	Lng	TD
1974	MIN	**3**	0	0	0	0.0	0	0	0	0	0.0	0	0
1975	MIN	1	0	4	22	**5.5**	13	**1**	0	0	0.0	0	0
1976	MIN	**3**	**3**	**24**	**106**	4.4	**41**	0	**3**	**29**	**9.7**	**15**	0
1978	MIN	1	0	0	0	0.0	0	0	0	0	0.0	0	0
		8	3	28	128	4.6	41	1	3	29	9.7	15	0

== Personal life ==
Brent played football for Arizona State University prior to playing professionally.

Brent is now a Computer Applications teacher at his alma mater South High School and has two daughters and two sons that attended South High as well. One of his two sons, Brent II is currently living in California.

He has earned bachelor's degrees in agribusiness and business administration, and a masters in curriculum education. He earned his teaching credential from CSU Bakersfield.

He has been awarded the NFL Teacher of the Year and has been inducted into the Bob Elias Hall of Fame and the South High School Hall of Fame.
