= Sean Dawkins =

American football player (1971–2023)

No. 87, 86, 81, 84
- Position: Wide receiver

Personal information
- Born: February 3, 1971; Red Bank, New Jersey, U.S.
- Died: August 9, 2023 (aged 52)
- Listed height: 6 ft 4 in (1.93 m)
- Listed weight: 213 lb (97 kg)

Career information
- High school: Homestead (Cupertino, California)
- College: California
- NFL draft: 1993: 1st round, 16th overall pick

Career history
- Indianapolis Colts (1993–1997); New Orleans Saints (1998); Seattle Seahawks (1999–2000); Jacksonville Jaguars (2001); Minnesota Vikings (2002)*
- * Offseason or practice squad member only

Awards and highlights
- Consensus All-American (1992); First-team All-Pac-10 (1992)

Career NFL statistics
- Receptions: 445
- Receiving yards: 6,291
- Receiving touchdowns: 25
- Stats at Pro Football Reference

Sean Russell Dawkins (February 3, 1971 – August 9, 2023) was an American professional football player who was a wide receiver for nine seasons in the National Football League (NFL). He played college football for the California Golden Bears, earning consensus All-American honors. A first-round draft pick in the 1993 NFL draft, he played professionally for the Indianapolis Colts, New Orleans Saints, Seattle Seahawks and Jacksonville Jaguars of the NFL.

== Early life ==
Sean Russell Dawkins was born in Red Bank, New Jersey, but raised in Sunnyvale, California. He distinguished himself as a wide receiver at Homestead High School in Cupertino, California.

== College career ==
Dawkins earned an athletic scholarship to attend the University of California, Berkeley, where he played for the California Golden Bears. While at Cal, Dawkins used his speed and size (6 feet 4 inches, 215 pounds) to establish himself as one of the country's most dangerous deep threats. His first two seasons at California were unqualified successes for him personally, as well as his Golden Bear teammates. In 1990, California won their first Bowl Game since 1938, defeating Wyoming in the Copper Bowl. The following season, the Bears dominated nationally ranked Clemson in the Citrus Bowl, which earned them the No. 7 ranking in the final CNN/USA Today Coaches Poll, their highest finish since 1950. It also marked the first time in school history that California won bowl games in consecutive seasons.

The 1992 season, however, included a new coach. After transforming the California program from a laughingstock into a national power, coach Bruce Snyder left Berkeley for Arizona State and was replaced by Keith Gilbertson. Gilbertson's squad struggled to a 4–7 record in 1992, but Dawkins was one bright spot in an otherwise forgettable year. Dawkins was recognized a consensus first-team All-American after the season in 1992, an honor which encouraged him to forgo his senior season and enter the NFL draft.

== Professional career ==
Pre-draft measurables
Height	Weight	Arm length	Hand span	40-yard dash	10-yard split	20-yard split	20-yard shuttle	Vertical jump	Broad jump
6 ft 3 7/8 in (1.93 m)	213 lb (97 kg)	32 1/4 in (0.82 m)	10 in (0.25 m)	4.61 s	1.63 s	2.70 s	4.00 s	32.0 in (0.81 m)	9 ft 11 in (3.02 m)
All values from NFL Combine

Dawkins was selected in the first round of the 1993 NFL draft by the Indianapolis Colts as the 16th overall pick and the second wide receiver chosen. In his third season with the Colts, Indianapolis won two playoff games before falling to the Pittsburgh Steelers in the AFC Championship game. He played in two more playoff games in his career, but both were losses.

After one season in New Orleans, Dawkins signed as a free agent with the Seattle Seahawks in 1999. He enjoyed his finest personal year in 1999 with 58 receptions for 992 yards. After two campaigns with Seattle, Dawkins spent his final year with the Jacksonville Jaguars. His career was clearly on the decline by that point, as he made only 20 catches with the Jaguars that season. Before the 2002 season, he signed with the Minnesota Vikings but was among the final cuts and never played in the NFL again.

== Life after football ==
Dawkins pursued a career in real estate in Sacramento, California, and later trained to become a police officer in San Jose, California.

Dawkins died on August 9, 2023, at the age of 52.

== NFL career statistics ==
Year	Team	GP	Rec	Yards	Avg	Lng	TD	FD	Fum	Lost
1993	IND	16	26	430	16.5	68	1	21	0	0
1994	IND	16	51	742	14.5	49	5	35	1	1
1995	IND	16	52	784	15.1	52	3	37	1	0
1996	IND	15	54	751	13.9	42	1	39	1	1
1997	IND	14	68	804	11.8	51	2	39	0	0
1998	NO	15	53	823	15.5	64	1	40	2	2
1999	SEA	16	58	992	17.1	45	7	51	1	1
2000	SEA	16	63	731	11.6	40	5	42	0	0
2001	JAX	16	20	234	11.7	28	0	11	1	0
Career		140	445	6,291	14.1	68	25	315	7	5

== See also ==
- List of NCAA major college football yearly receiving leaders
