= NFL Teacher of the Year =

NFL Teacher of the Year is an award given by the National Football League. When the award began in 1990, it was to award a teacher who "had the single greatest impact on [a player's] educational and life-skills development" but starting in 2010 it has been awarded to former players who have gone on to succeed as teachers themselves.

== NFL Teachers of the Year (teachers who taught players) ==
- 2007 Jacquelyn Stevens (Washington-Marion Magnet School)

== NFL Teachers of the Year (players turned teachers) ==
- 1991 Miriam Williams (Palmetto Middle School)
- 1994 Terry Lowe (Greenwich High)
- 2010 Frank Beede (Freedom High School)
- 2011 Burt Grossman (Hoover High School)
- 2012 Brent McClanahan (South High School)
