= Kris Heppner =

American football player (born 1977)

No. 4
- Position: Kicker

Personal information
- Born: January 18, 1977 (age 49); Great Falls, Montana, U.S.
- Listed height: 5 ft 9 in (1.75 m)
- Listed weight: 180 lb (82 kg)

Career information
- High school: Great Falls
- College: Montana
- NFL draft: 2000: undrafted

Career history
- Seattle Seahawks (2000); Washington Redskins (2000)

Career NFL statistics
- Games played: 8
- Field goals made: 10
- Field goals attempted: 15
- Field goals %: 66.7%
- Career long FG: 45
- Stats at Pro Football Reference

Kristopher Heppner (born January 18, 1977) is an American former professional football player who was a placekicker in the National Football League for the Seattle Seahawks and Washington Redskins. He played college football for the Montana Grizzlies.
