= Erric Pegram =

American football player (born 1969)

No. 41, 33, 20, 44
- Position: Running back

Personal information
- Born: January 7, 1969 (age 57); Dallas, Texas, U.S.
- Listed height: 5 ft 10 in (1.78 m)
- Listed weight: 195 lb (88 kg)

Career information
- High school: Hillcrest (Dallas, Texas)
- College: North Texas
- NFL draft: 1991: 6th round, 145th overall pick

Career history
- Atlanta Falcons (1991–1994); Pittsburgh Steelers (1995–1996); San Diego Chargers (1997); New York Giants (1997)

Career NFL statistics
- Rushing yards: 3,398
- Rushing average: 4
- Total touchdowns: 15
- Stats at Pro Football Reference

Erric Demont Pegram (born January 7, 1969) is an American former professional football player who was a running back for seven seasons in the National Football League (NFL) from 1991 to 1997. He played college football for the North Texas Mean Green and was selected by the Atlanta Falcons in the sixth round of the 1991 NFL draft.

Pegram played high school football at Hillcrest High School, a perennial powerhouse. His best season as a pro was during the 1993 season with the Falcons, rushing for 1,185 yards and three touchdowns. In a game that season against the San Francisco 49ers on September 19, 1993, Pegram ran for 192 yards on 27 carries. Two years later, he found himself as the leading rusher for the Pittsburgh Steelers with 813 yards and led them to a trip to Super Bowl XXX, only to lose to the Dallas Cowboys 27–17. He ended his career after the 1997 NFL season when he split time between the New York Giants and San Diego Chargers.

Pegram lives in Naples, Florida, is married to Michelle Pegram, a school teacher. He has four daughters; Alexandria, Taylor a former track athlete at UNLV, Nadia a tennis athlete at Howard University, and Natalia a freshman in high school.
