= Reggie Doster =

American football player (born 1976)

No. 24, 31
- Position: Defensive back

Personal information
- Born: January 2, 1976 (age 50)
- Listed height: 5 ft 9 in (1.75 m)
- Listed weight: 185 lb (84 kg)

Career information
- High school: Deerfield Beach (Deerfield Beach, Florida)
- College: UCF
- NFL draft: 1999: undrafted

Career history
- Oakland Raiders (1999)*; Seattle Seahawks (1999)*; Atlanta Falcons (2000)*; Orlando Rage (2001); Orlando Predators (2002–2003); New Orleans Saints (2003)*; Detroit Fury (2004); Orlando Predators (2005); Philadelphia Soul (2006); Grand Rapids Rampage (2007); Georgia Force (2007); Utah Blaze (2008)
- * Offseason or practice squad member only

Career AFL statistics
- Tackles: 440.5
- Interceptions: 15
- Pass breakups: 61
- Receiving yards: 40
- Total TDs: 2
- Stats at ArenaFan.com

Reggie Doster (born January 2, 1976) is a former XFL cornerback and Arena Football League defensive back. He played for the Orlando Rage, Orlando Predators, Detroit Fury, Philadelphia Soul, Georgia Force, Grand Rapids Rampage and Utah Blaze in a career lasting from 2001 to 2008. He played college football at UCF.

== Early life ==
While attending Deerfield Beach High School in Deerfield Beach, Florida, Doster won All-County honors in football, basketball, and track.
