= Derrick Mayes =

American football player (born 1974)

No. 80, 87
- Position: Wide receiver

Personal information
- Born: January 28, 1974 (age 52); Indianapolis, Indiana, U.S.
- Listed height: 6 ft 0 in (1.83 m)
- Listed weight: 207 lb (94 kg)

Career information
- High school: North Central (Indianapolis, Indiana)
- College: Notre Dame
- NFL draft: 1996: 2nd round, 56th overall pick

Career history
- Green Bay Packers (1996–1998); Seattle Seahawks (1999–2000); Kansas City Chiefs (2001)*
- * Offseason or practice squad member only

Awards and highlights
- Super Bowl champion (XXXI); Second-team All-American (1995)

Career NFL statistics
- Receptions: 145
- Receiving yards: 1,823
- Receiving touchdowns: 16
- Stats at Pro Football Reference

Derrick Binet Mayes (born January 28, 1974) is an American former professional football player who was a wide receiver for five seasons in the National Football League (NFL). He played college football for the Notre Dame Fighting Irish, earning second-team All-American honors in 1995. He was selected by the Green Bay Packers in the second round of the 1996 NFL draft. Mayes also played for the Seattle Seahawks, and was briefly a member of the Kansas City Chiefs.

== Early life ==
After playing high school football at North Central High School in Indianapolis, Mayes played college football at the University of Notre Dame from 1992 to 1995. He held the school record for career touchdown receptions until the record was broken by Jeff Samardzija.

== Professional career ==
=== Green Bay Packers ===
The Green Bay Packers selected Mayes in the second round (56th overall) of the 1996 NFL draft. He caught six passes in his rookie season, and roomed with fellow receiver Andre Rison once Rison joined the team mid-season. He was part of the Packers' Super Bowl XXXI winning team. In 1997, Mayes took on a bit of a punt returning role as well as expanding his time on offense. Mayes had arguably his best game as a Packer in 1998, catching three touchdowns in a game against the Carolina Panthers. Before the 1999 season, Mayes was traded to the Seattle Seahawks for a seventh-round draft pick.

=== Seattle Seahawks ===
In Mayes' first season in Seattle, he caught a career-high 62 passes for 829 yards and 10 touchdowns. In 2000, Mayes only caught 29 passes and one touchdown. On March 1, 2001, Mayes was cut by the Seahawks.

=== Kansas City Chiefs ===
Mayes was signed by the Kansas City Chiefs on July 10, 2001, but was released during final roster cutdowns later that year.

== Post-career life ==
Mayes graduated from Notre Dame with a communications degree. He now does video work, speaks to high school athletes, and runs former Notre Dame coach Lou Holtz's foundation. He also starred in Ultimate Hustler, a "hip-hop Celebrity Apprentice," in 2005.
