= Tim Watson (defensive tackle) =

American football player (born 1974)

Profile
- Position: Defensive tackle

Personal information
- Born: December 23, 1974 (age 51)
- Listed height: 6 ft 4 in (1.93 m)
- Listed weight: 290 lb (132 kg)

Career information
- High school: Mainland (Linwood, NJ)
- College: Rowan
- NFL draft: 2000: 6th round, 185th overall pick

Career history
- Seattle Seahawks (2000)

Tim Watson (born December 23, 1974) is an American former football defensive tackle in the National Football League (NFL) for the Seattle Seahawks. He played college football at Maryland for three seasons until he was dismissed from the team for academic reasons. Watson would later play football at Rowan University and was drafted in the sixth round of the 2000 NFL draft. During training camp in his rookie season Watson suffered a lacerated knee as the result of slipping on a practice sled. The practice sled had an exposed hook which managed to rip off two inches of cartilage from Watson's left knee. He was then placed on injured reserves for the entire 2000 season and waived prior to the start of the 2001 season. Watson sued the Seahawks organization claiming the team deliberately injured him. In March 2005 a state court of appeals denied a motion for a trial citing a lack of evidence. In 2017 Watson said he held no ill resentment for the Seahawks organization and was appreciative of the opportunity they gave him.
