= Willie Williams (cornerback, born 1970) =

American football player and coach

No. 27
- Position: Cornerback

Personal information
- Born: December 26, 1970 (age 55); Columbia, South Carolina, U.S.
- Listed height: 5 ft 9 in (1.75 m)
- Listed weight: 194 lb (88 kg)

Career information
- High school: Spring Valley (Columbia)
- College: Western Carolina
- NFL draft: 1993: 6th round, 162nd overall pick

Career history
- As player: Pittsburgh Steelers (1993–1996); Seattle Seahawks (1997–2003); Pittsburgh Steelers (2004–2005); As coach: Winston Churchill High School Bulldogs (2017-2019)

Awards and highlights
- Super Bowl champion (XL)

Career NFL statistics
- Tackles: 602
- Interceptions: 26
- Sacks: 4
- Touchdowns: 4
- Stats at Pro Football Reference

Willie James Williams (born December 26, 1970) is an American former professional football player who was a cornerback in the National Football League (NFL). He played college football for the Western Carolina Catamounts. After his playing career, he coached youth football. He is also the cousin of WNBA player Tamera Young.

== Career ==
Williams was selected out of Western Carolina University by the Pittsburgh Steelers in 1993, spending 6 of his 13 seasons in the league with the team. He was a key member of the 1995 team that played in Super Bowl XXX, and the only member from that team to be on the roster of the 2005 squad, who won Super Bowl XL over the Seattle Seahawks. From 1997 to 2003, Williams played for the Seahawks, before returning to the Steelers for the 2004 and 2005 seasons.

On March 3, 2006, Willams and veteran QB Tommy Maddox, were released as salary cap cuts. Williams then retired from football.

On January 26, 2017, he was named the head coach for Winston Churchill High School, where he coached until leaving the team in December 2019.

== See also ==
- List of Spring Valley High School alumni
