= Reggie Brown (fullback) =

American football player (born 1973)

No. 34
- Position: Fullback

Personal information
- Born: June 26, 1973 (age 53); Highland Park, Michigan, U.S.
- Listed height: 6 ft 0 in (1.83 m)
- Listed weight: 244 lb (111 kg)

Career information
- High school: Henry Ford
- College: Fresno State
- NFL draft: 1996: 3rd round, 91st overall pick

Career history
- Seattle Seahawks (1996–2000); Green Bay Packers (2002)*
- * Offseason or practice squad member only

Career NFL statistics
- Rushing yards: 46
- Rushing average: 2.6
- Receptions: 36
- Receiving yards: 237
- Total touchdowns: 1
- Stats at Pro Football Reference

Reggie Brown (born June 26, 1973) is an American former professional football player who was a fullback for the Seattle Seahawks of the National Football League (NFL). He was selected in the third round with the 91st overall pick of the 1996 NFL Draft by the Seahawks. He appeared in 61 games over 5 seasons, including 10 starts.

Pre-draft measurables
Height	Weight	Arm length	Hand span	40-yard dash	10-yard split	20-yard split	Vertical jump
6 ft 0 1/8 in (1.83 m)	242 lb (110 kg)	31 1/4 in (0.79 m)	9 1/4 in (0.23 m)	4.86 s	1.72 s	2.82 s	32.5 in (0.83 m)
