= Frank Beede =

American football player (born 1973)

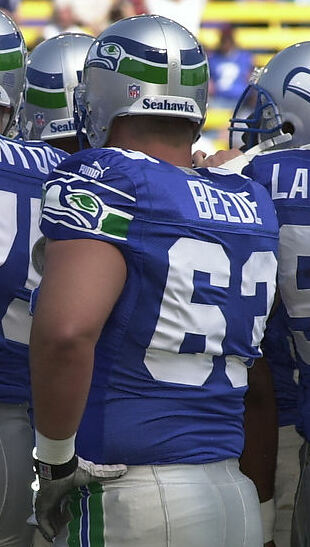
- Beede in 2000

No. 63, 65
- Positions: Guard, center

Personal information
- Born: May 1, 1973 (age 53); Antioch, California, U.S.
- Listed height: 6 ft 4 in (1.93 m)
- Listed weight: 296 lb (134 kg)

Career information
- High school: Antioch
- College: California (1991–1994); Panhandle State (1995)
- NFL draft: 1996: undrafted

Career history
- Seattle Seahawks (1996–2000); San Jose SaberCats (2001–2007)

Awards and highlights
- 3× ArenaBowl champion (2002, 2004, 2007); NAIA second-team All-American (1995); First-team All-Oklahoma Intercollegiate Conference (1995); NFL Teacher of the Year (2010)

Career NFL statistics
- Games played: 47
- Games started: 8
- Stats at Pro Football Reference

Career AFL statistics
- Tackles: 11
- Passes defended: 3
- Stats at ArenaFan.com

Frank McNulty Beede III (born March 1, 1973) is an American former professional football player who was an offensive lineman for five seasons with the Seattle Seahawks in the National Football League (NFL). He also played seven years in the Arena Football League (AFL) for the San Jose SaberCats.

== Early life ==
Beede was born in Antioch, California and graduated from Antioch High School in 1991 where he lettered in three sports: football, wrestling and track. He was the BVAL heavyweight wrestling champion in his senior year.

== College career ==
Pursuing football in college, Beede played on the offensive line as a guard for three seasons at the University of California, Berkeley. He played in the 1992 Citrus Bowl and 1993 Alamo Bowl and earned honorable mention for the 1994 All-Pacific-10 Conference. Beede was thrown off the team before his senior year for using steroids and transferred to Oklahoma Panhandle State University. There he was named to the NAIA All-America second-team and All-Oklahoma Intercollegiate Conference first-team.

== Professional career ==
Beede joined the Seattle Seahawks in 1996 becoming the first free agent rookie starter in franchise history. He played five years with the Seahawks.

After his years with the Seahawks, Beede joined the Arena Football League as center for the San Jose SaberCats. During his seven years with the Sabercats, he was part of a team that won three ArenaBowl titles in 2002, 2004, and 2007.

== Personal life ==
Beede married his wife, Kim, in 2000, and together they have two children. On August 16, 2024 a divorce/separation case was filed against Kim.

Retiring from football in 2007, Beede returned to eastern Contra Costa County as a history teacher and football coach. In 2010, Frank was honored by the NFL as its Teacher of the Year recipient. He stated that he never considered himself a gifted athlete, but that his work ethic and attitude sometimes made him victorious as an NFL player. He taught at Freedom High School (Oakley, California) since 2008, telling his students that it is not about the skill, but about the will.

In June 2021 it was announced that Beede would become principal at Knightsen Elementary School.

In June 2025 it was announced that Beede would become principal at Alhambra High School in Martinez, CA.

In August 2025, Beede became the new principal at Alhambra High School.
