= 1999 Minnesota Vikings season =

NFL team season

- Owner: Red McCombs
- General manager: Tim Connolly
- Head coach: Dennis Green
- Offensive coordinator: Ray Sherman
- Defensive coordinator: Foge Fazio
- Home stadium: Hubert H. Humphrey Metrodome

Results
- Record: 10–6
- Division place: 2nd NFC Central
- Playoffs: Won Wild Card Playoffs (vs. Cowboys) 27–10; Lost Divisional Playoffs (at Rams) 37–49
- All-Pros: WR Cris Carter (1st team); P Mitch Berger (2nd team); S Robert Griffith (2nd team)
- Pro Bowlers: P Mitch Berger; C Jeff Christy; WR Cris Carter; OG Randall McDaniel; WR Randy Moss

Uniform
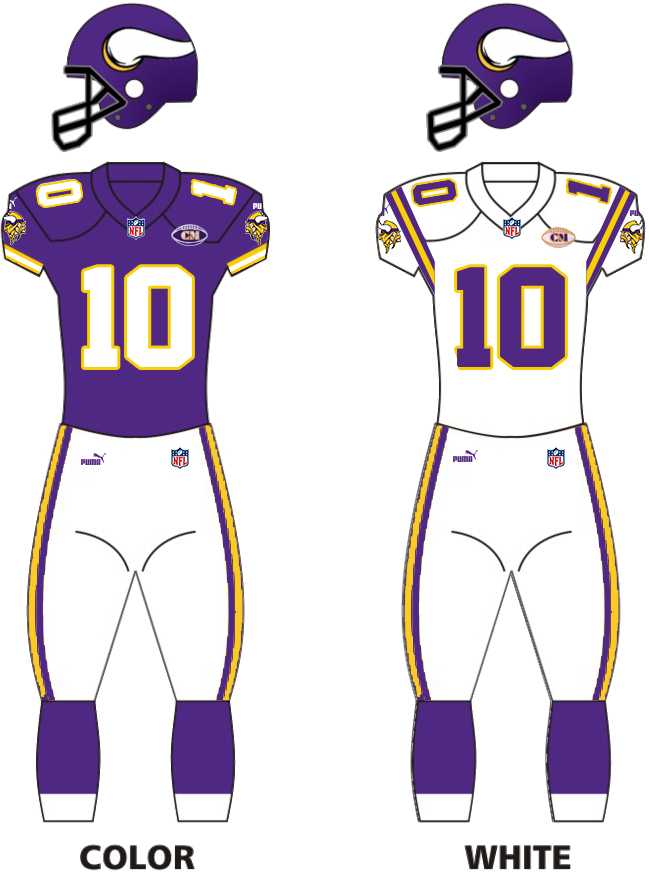

The 1999 season was the Minnesota Vikings' 39th in the National Football League (NFL). After going a near perfect 15–1 record in 1998, the Vikings began the 1999 season with high expectations of another great season. Randall Cunningham resumed duties again in 1999, but after a struggling 2–4 start to the season, he was benched and Jeff George was given the starting job as quarterback. A notable part of the season is that, before or during the season, a decent amount of contributors (such as Derrick Alexander, Orlando Bobo, and Jerry Ball, and Stalin Colinet) from their dominant 1998 team were lost to the Cleveland Browns "expansion" team.

George finished the season with an 8–2 record, and led the Vikings into the postseason once again, with an overall team record of 10–6 failing to match their record from the 1998 season. Minnesota beat the Dallas Cowboys in the Wild Card Game 27–10 and faced playoff newcomer Kurt Warner and the St. Louis Rams in the divisional round. The game was a shootout which Minnesota led 17–14 at halftime, but the Rams outscored Minnesota 35 to 20 in the second half to win 49–37. St. Louis would then go on to win Super Bowl XXXIV against the Titans.

== Offseason ==
=== 1999 expansion draft ===
Vikings selected during the expansion draft
Pick	Name	Position	Expansion team
18	Duane Butler	Safety	Cleveland Browns
27	Orlando Bobo	Guard	Cleveland Browns

=== 1999 draft ===
Pro Bowler

1999 Minnesota Vikings Draft
Draft order		Player name	Position	College	Notes
Round	Selection	Player name	Position	College	Notes
1	11	Daunte Culpepper	Quarterback	UCF	From Redskins (Note: The Vikings traded QB Brad Johnson to the Redskins in exchange for first- and third-round selections (11th and 73rd overall), and a 2000 second-round selection (56th overall).)
1	29	Dimitrius Underwood	Defensive end	Michigan State	
2	44	Jim Kleinsasser	Tight end	North Dakota	From Steelers (Note: The Vikings traded their second-, third- and fifth-round selections (59th, 73rd and 163rd overall) to the Steelers in exchange for a second-round selection (44th overall).)
2	59	Traded to the Pittsburgh Steelers			
3	73	Traded to the Pittsburgh Steelers			From Redskins
3	91	Traded to the New England Patriots (Note: The Vikings traded their third-round selection (91st overall) to the Patriots in exchange for CB Jimmy Hitchcock.)			
4	120	Kenny Wright	Cornerback	Northwestern State	From Dolphins (Note: The Vikings received a fourth-round selection (120th overall) from the Dolphins as compensation for restricted free agent TE Hunter Goodwin.)
4	125	Jay Humphrey	Offensive tackle	Texas	
5	163	Traded to the Pittsburgh Steelers			
5	169	Chris Jones	Safety	Clemson	Compensatory pick
6	185	Talance Sawyer	Defensive tackle	UNLV	From Buccaneers, via Ravens (Note: The Vikings traded C Everett Lindsay to the Ravens in exchange for a sixth-round selection (185th overall).)
6	199	Antico Dalton	Linebacker	Hampton	
7	236	Noel Scarlett	Defensive tackle	Langston	

== Staff ==
1999 Minnesota Vikings staff
Front office: Owner – Red McCombs; President – Gary Woods; Executive vice president/general manager – Tim Connolly; Director of football administration – Rob Brzezinski; Head coaches: Head coach – Dennis Green; Assistant head coach/defensive backs – Richard Solomon; Offensive coaches: Offensive coordinator – Ray Sherman; Quarterbacks – Alex Wood; Running backs – Carl Hargrave; Wide receivers – Hubbard Alexander; Tight ends – Dave Atkins; Offensive line – Mike Tice; Quality control – Dean Dalton	Defensive coaches: Defensive coordinator – Foge Fazio; Defensive line – Andre Patterson; Inside linebackers – Tom Olivadotti; Outside linebackers – Trent Walters; Special teams coaches: Special teams – Gary Zauner; Strength and conditioning: Strength and conditioning – Steve Wetzel; Assistant strength and conditioning – John Kasper

== Roster ==
1999 Minnesota Vikings roster
Quarterbacks (QB): 8 Todd Bouman; 12 Daunte Culpepper; 7 Randall Cunningham; 3 Jeff George; Running backs (RB): 44 Leroy Hoard; 40 Jim Kleinsasser FB; 45 John Henry Mills FB; 33 Harold Morrow FB; 26 Robert Smith; 21 Moe Williams KR; Wide receivers (WR): 80 Cris Carter; 89 Matthew Hatchette; 84 Randy Moss PR; 19 Yo Murphy; 86 Jake Reed; 81 Chris Walsh; Tight ends (TE): 87 Carlester Crumpler; 82 Andrew Glover; 85 Andrew Jordan	Offensive linemen (OL): 78 Matt Birk; 62 Jeff Christy C; 71 David Dixon G; 67 Jay Humphrey T; 63 Corbin Lacina G; 76 Chris Liwienski G/T; 64 Randall McDaniel G; 73 Todd Steussie T; 77 Korey Stringer T; Defensive linemen (DL): 91 John Burrough DE; 96 Jerry Ball DT; 92 Duane Clemons DE; 95 Keith Council DE; 56 Chris Doleman DE; 75 Joe Phillips DT; 93 John Randle DE/DT; 97 Talance Sawyer DE; 94 Tony Williams DT	Linebackers (LB): 51 Rob Holmberg OLB; 55 Olrick Johnson MLB; 58 Ed McDaniel MLB; 57 Dwayne Rudd OLB; 52 Kailee Wong OLB; Defensive backs (DB): 30 Antonio Banks CB/S; 32 Anthony Bass SS; 24 Robert Griffith SS; 37 Jimmy Hitchcock CB; 31 Don Morgan FS; 29 Chris Rogers CB; 28 Robert Tate CB; 20 Kenny Wright CB; Special teams (ST): 1 Gary Anderson K; 17 Mitch Berger P; 68 Mike Morris LS	Practice squad: 50 Antico Dalton LB; -- Carlos Jones CB; -- Mike Parker LB; 60 Cory Withrow C; Reserve: 50 Pete Bercich LB (IR); 23 Torrian Gray S (PUP); 22 David Palmer (IR); 27 Keith Thibodeaux CB (IR); 42 Orlando Thomas S (IR); Rookies in italics 53 active, 5 reserve, 4 practice squad

== Preseason ==
Week	Date	Opponent	Result	Record	Venue	Attendance
1	August 13	New York Giants	L 21–36	0–1	Hubert H. Humphrey Metrodome	63,434
2	August 21	at Cleveland Browns	W 24–17	1–1	Cleveland Browns Stadium	71,398
3	August 26	Philadelphia Eagles	W 17–13	2–1	Hubert H. Humphrey Metrodome	63,387
4	September 3	at New York Jets	L 17–38	2–2	Giants Stadium	76,782

== Regular season ==
=== Schedule ===
Week	Date	Opponent	Result	Record	Venue	Attendance
1	September 12	at Atlanta Falcons	W 17–14	1–0	Georgia Dome	69,555
2	September 19	Oakland Raiders	L 17–22	1–1	Hubert H. Humphrey Metrodome	64,080
3	September 26	at Green Bay Packers	L 20–23	1–2	Lambeau Field	59,868
4	October 3	Tampa Bay Buccaneers	W 21–14	2–2	Hubert H. Humphrey Metrodome	64,106
5	October 10	Chicago Bears	L 22–24	2–3	Hubert H. Humphrey Metrodome	64,107
6	October 17	at Detroit Lions	L 23–25	2–4	Silverdome	76,516
7	October 24	San Francisco 49ers	W 40–16	3–4	Hubert H. Humphrey Metrodome	64,109
8	October 31	at Denver Broncos	W 23–20	4–4	Mile High Stadium	75,021
9	November 8	Dallas Cowboys	W 27–17	5–4	Hubert H. Humphrey Metrodome	64,111
10	November 14	at Chicago Bears	W 27–24 (OT)	6–4	Soldier Field	61,481
11	Bye					
12	November 28	San Diego Chargers	W 35–27	7–4	Hubert H. Humphrey Metrodome	64,232
13	December 6	at Tampa Bay Buccaneers	L 17–24	7–5	Raymond James Stadium	65,741
14	December 12	at Kansas City Chiefs	L 28–31	7–6	Arrowhead Stadium	78,932
15	December 20	Green Bay Packers	W 24–20	8–6	Hubert H. Humphrey Metrodome	64,203
16	December 26	at New York Giants	W 34–17	9–6	Giants Stadium	78,095
17	January 2	Detroit Lions	W 24–17	10–6	Hubert H. Humphrey Metrodome	64,103

=== Game summaries ===
==== Week 1: at Atlanta Falcons ====
Week 1: Minnesota Vikings at Atlanta Falcons

Quarter	1	2	3	4	Total
Vikings	0	17	0	0	17
Falcons	0	7	0	7	14

at Georgia Dome, Atlanta, Georgia

- Date: September 12
- Game time: 4:15 p.m. EDT
- Game weather: None (indoor stadium)
- Game attendance: 69,555
- Referee: Gerry Austin (34)
- TV announcers (FOX): Pat Summerall, John Madden, D.J. Johnson
- Recap, Game Book

Game information

First quarter

- No scoring plays.

Second quarter

- MIN – Cris Carter 2-yard pass from Randall Cunningham (Gary Anderson kick), 13:54. Vikings 7–0. Drive: 2 plays, 58 yards, 0:00.
- MIN – Gary Anderson 36-yard field goal, 10:23. Vikings 10–0. Drive: 5 plays, 3 yards, 2:26.
- MIN – Leroy Hoard 1-yard run (Gary Anderson kick), 1:48. Vikings 17–0. Drive: 9 plays, 74 yards, 4:34.
- ATL – Chris Calloway 23-yard pass from Chris Chandler (Morten Andersen kick), 0:43. Vikings 17–7. Drive: 5 plays, 80 yards, 1:05.

Third quarter

- No scoring plays.

Fourth quarter

- ATL – Bob Christian 1-yard run (Morten Andersen kick), 13:18. Vikings 17–14. Drive: 10 plays, 61 yards, 5:18.

Top passers

- MIN – Randall Cunningham – 22/33, 184 yards, TD
- ATL – Chris Chandler – 17/30, 258 yards, TD

Top rushers

- MIN – Leroy Hoard – 12 rushes, 50 yards, TD
- ATL – Jamal Anderson – 16 rushes, 50 yards

Top receivers

- MIN – Cris Carter – 7 receptions, 70 yards, TD
- ATL – Chris Calloway – 5 receptions, 84 yards, TD

==== Week 2: vs. Oakland Raiders ====
Week 2: Oakland Raiders at Minnesota Vikings

Quarter	1	2	3	4	Total
Raiders	0	6	16	0	22
Vikings	7	3	0	7	17

at Hubert H. Humphrey Metrodome, Minneapolis, Minnesota

- Date: September 19
- Game time: 12:00 p.m. CDT
- Game weather: None (indoor stadium)
- Game attendance: 64,080
- Referee: Larry Nemmers (20)
- TV announcers (CBS): Verne Lundquist, Dan Dierdorf, Marcus Allen
- Recap, Game Book

Game information

First quarter

- MIN – Carlester Crumpler 31-yard pass from Randall Cunningham (Gary Anderson kick), 5:03. Vikings 7–0. Drive: 7 plays, 73 yards, 3:16.

Second quarter

- OAK – Michael Husted 36-yard field goal, 11:34. Vikings 7–3. Drive: 9 plays, 57 yards, 4:04.
- MIN – Gary Anderson 36-yard field goal, 8:16. Vikings 10–3. Drive: 8 plays, 53 yards, 3:18.
- OAK – Michael Husted 37-yard field goal, 0:36. Vikings 10–6. Drive: 9 plays, 30 yards, 2:10.

Third quarter

- OAK – James Jett 9-yard pass from Rich Gannon (Michael Husted kick), 8:55. Raiders 13–10. Drive: 9 plays, 80 yards, 6:05.
- OAK – Michael Husted 42-yard field goal, 7:01. Raiders 16–10. Drive: 4 plays, 6 yards, 1:36.
- OAK – Rich Gannon 5-yard run (pass failed), 1:08. Raiders 22–10. Drive: 7 plays, 64 yards, 4:14.

Fourth quarter

- MIN – Jake Reed 28-yard pass from Randall Cunningham (Gary Anderson kick), 14:06. Raiders 22–17. Drive: 7 plays, 80 yards, 2:02.

Top passers

- OAK – Rich Gannon – 21/33, 248 yards, TD
- MIN – Randall Cunningham – 23/39, 364 yards, 2 TD, 2 INT

Top rushers

- OAK – Tyrone Wheatley – 18 rushes, 83 yards
- MIN – Robert Smith – 11 rushes, 24 yards

Top receivers

- OAK – Tim Brown – 9 receptions, 86 yards
- MIN – Jake Reed – 5 receptions, 100 yards, TD

==== Week 3: at Green Bay Packers ====
Week 3: Minnesota Vikings at Green Bay Packers

Quarter	1	2	3	4	Total
Vikings	7	3	3	7	20
Packers	0	10	3	10	23

at Lambeau Field, Green Bay, Wisconsin

- Date: September 26
- Game time: 3:15 p.m. CDT
- Game weather: Cloudy, 82 °F (28 °C)
- Game attendance: 59,868
- Referee: Johnny Grier (23)
- TV announcers (FOX): Pat Summerall, John Madden, D.J. Johnson
- Recap, Game Book

Game information

First quarter

- MIN – Leroy Hoard 2-yard run (Gary Anderson kick), 4:26. Vikings 7–0. Drive: 14 plays, 94 yards, 7:37.

Second quarter

- GB – Ryan Longwell 28-yard field goal, 14:07. Vikings 7–3. Drive: 11 plays, 70 yards, 5:19.
- GB – Antuan Edwards 26-yard interception return (Ryan Longwell kick), 7:37. Packers 10–7.
- MIN – Gary Anderson 34-yard field goal, 0:50. Tied 10–10. Drive: 15 plays, 63 yards, 6:47.

Third quarter

- MIN – Gary Anderson 22-yard field goal, 9:17. Vikings 13–10. Drive: 13 plays, 61 yards, 5:43.
- GB – Ryan Longwell 35-yard field goal, 3:05. Tied 13–13. Drive: 14 plays, 66 yards, 6:12.

Fourth quarter

- GB – Ryan Longwell 34-yard field goal, 4:25. Packers 16–13. Drive: 13 plays, 64 yards, 5:47.
- MIN – Randy Moss 10-yard pass from Randall Cunningham (Gary Anderson kick), 1:56. Vikings 20–16. Drive: 5 plays, 80 yards, 2:29.
- GB – Corey Bradford 23-yard pass from Brett Favre (Ryan Longwell kick), 0:12. Packers 23–20. Drive: 7 plays, 77 yards, 1:44.

Top passers

- MIN – Randall Cunningham – 18/32, 244 yards, TD, 2 INT
- GB – Brett Favre – 24/39, 304 yards, TD

Top rushers

- MIN – Robert Smith – 21 rushes, 85 yards
- GB – Dorsey Levens – 18 rushes, 49 yards

Top receivers

- MIN – Jake Reed – 6 receptions, 108 yards
- GB – Bill Schroeder – 5 receptions, 85 yards

==== Week 4: vs. Tampa Bay Buccaneers ====
Week 4: Tampa Bay Buccaneers at Minnesota Vikings

Quarter	1	2	3	4	Total
Buccaneers	0	7	0	7	14
Vikings	17	0	0	0	17

at Hubert H. Humphrey Metrodome, Minneapolis, Minnesota

- Date: October 3
- Game time: 12:00 p.m. CDT
- Game weather: None (indoor stadium)
- Game attendance: 64,106
- Referee: Mike Carey (94)
- TV announcers (FOX): Dick Stockton, Matt Millen, Pam Oliver
- Recap, Game Book

Game information

First quarter

- MIN – Randy Moss 61-yard pass from Randall Cunningham (Gary Anderson kick), 10:47. Vikings 7–0. Drive: 4 plays, 82 yards, 2:10.
- MIN – Randy Moss 27-yard pass from Randall Cunningham (Gary Anderson kick), 6:50. Vikings 14–0. Drive: 6 plays, 39 yards, 2:41.
- MIN – Andrew Glover 12-yard pass from Randall Cunningham (Gary Anderson kick), 0:22. Vikings 21–0. Drive: 5 plays, 86 yards, 1:59.

Second quarter

- TB – Dave Moore 26-yard pass from Trent Dilfer (Martín Gramática kick), 9:22. Vikings 21–7. Drive: 11 plays, 73 yards, 6:00.

Third quarter

- No scoring plays.

Fourth quarter

- TB – Reidel Anthony 26-yard pass from Trent Dilfer (Martín Gramática kick), 7:34. Vikings 21–14. Drive: 5 plays, 72 yards, 2:34.

Top passers

- TB – Trent Dilfer – 25/39, 301 yards, 2 TD, INT
- MIN – Randall Cunningham – 26/34, 296 yards, 3 TD, INT

Top rushers

- TB – Warrick Dunn – 16 rushes, 49 yards
- MIN – Robert Smith – 19 rushes, 59 yards

Top receivers

- TB – Reidel Anthony – 7 receptions, 94 yards, TD
- MIN – Randy Moss – 4 receptions, 120 yards, 2 TD

==== Week 5: vs. Chicago Bears ====
Week 5: Chicago Bears at Minnesota Vikings

Quarter	1	2	3	4	Total
Bears	7	7	7	3	24
Vikings	3	9	3	7	22

at Hubert H. Humphrey Metrodome, Minneapolis, Minnesota

- Date: October 10
- Game time: 12:00 p.m. CDT
- Game weather: None (indoor stadium)
- Game attendance: 64,107
- Referee: Jeff Triplette (42)
- TV announcers (FOX): Sam Rosen, Bill Maas, Dan Jiggetts
- Recap, Game Book

Game information

First quarter

- CHI – Sean Harris fumble recovery in the end zone (Jeff Jaeger kick), 9:10. Bears 7–0.
- MIN – Gary Anderson 26-yard field goal, 3:04. Bears 7–3. Drive: 12 plays, 65 yards, 6:06.

Second quarter

- MIN – Gary Anderson 40-yard field goal, 14:52. Bears 7–6. Drive: 6 plays, 36 yards, 2:04.
- MIN – Gary Anderson 23-yard field goal, 6:20. Vikings 9–7. Drive: 5 plays, 33 yards, 1:28.
- CHI – Curtis Conway 30-yard pass from Shane Matthews (Jeff Jaeger kick), 1:13. Bears 14–9. Drive: 5 plays, 58 yards, 1:53.
- MIN – Gary Anderson 26-yard field goal, 0:00. Bears 14–12. Drive: 8 plays, 62 yards, 1:13.

Third quarter

- CHI – Marcus Robinson 3-yard pass from Shane Matthews (Jeff Jaeger kick), 7:47. Bears 21–12. Drive: 9 plays, 63 yards, 5:03.
- MIN – Gary Anderson 34-yard field goal, 2:31. Bears 21–15. Drive: 12 plays, 66 yards, 5:16.

Fourth quarter

- CHI – Jeff Jaeger 41-yard field goal, 12:21. Bears 24–15. Drive: 12 plays, 58 yards, 5:10.
- MIN – Chris Walsh 18-yard pass from Randall Cunningham (Gary Anderson kick), 0:02. Bears 24–22. Drive: 5 plays, 72 yards, 0:41.

Top passers

- CHI – Shane Matthews – 19/28, 184 yards, 2 TD
- MIN – Randall Cunningham – 25/47, 309 yards, TD, 3 INT

Top rushers

- CHI – Curtis Enis – 27 rushes, 66 yards
- MIN – Robert Smith – 12 rushes, 107 yards

Top receivers

- CHI – Marcus Robinson – 8 receptions, 90 yards, TD
- MIN – Randy Moss – 8 receptions, 122 yards

==== Week 6: at Detroit Lions ====
Week 6: Minnesota Vikings at Detroit Lions

Quarter	1	2	3	4	Total
Vikings	0	0	14	9	23
Lions	10	9	0	6	25

at Pontiac Silverdome, Detroit, Michigan

- Date: October 17
- Game time: 1:00 p.m. EDT
- Game weather: None (indoor stadium)
- Game attendance: 76,516
- Referee: Ron Winter (82)
- TV announcers (FOX): Dick Stockton, Matt Millen, Pam Oliver
- Recap, Game Book

Game information

First quarter

- DET – Terry Fair 41-yard interception return (Jason Hanson kick), 7:17. Lions 7–0.
- DET – Jason Hanson 20-yard field goal, 1:03. Lions 10–0. Drive: 6 plays, 66 yards, 2:52.

Second quarter

- DET – Jason Hanson 49-yard field goal, 10:06. Lions 13–0. Drive: 8 plays, 27 yards, 2:57.
- DET – Jason Hanson 29-yard field goal, 6:35. Lions 16–0. Drive: 4 plays, 2 yards, 2:02.
- DET – Jason Hanson 30-yard field goal, 0:25. Lions 19–0. Drive: 10 plays, 59 yards, 4:18.

Third quarter

- MIN – Cris Carter 17-yard pass from Jeff George (Gary Anderson kick), 12:04. Lions 19–7. Drive: 5 plays, 80 yards, 2:56.
- MIN – Randy Moss 36-yard pass from Jeff George (Gary Anderson kick), 9:16. Lions 19–14. Drive: 1 play, 36 yards, 0:07.

Fourth quarter

- MIN – Leroy Hoard 2-yard run (pass failed), 13:30. Vikings 20–19. Drive: 5 plays, 60 yards, 2:43.
- DET – Jason Hanson 47-yard field goal, 7:06. Lions 22–20. Drive: 11 plays, 54 yards, 6:24.
- MIN – Gary Anderson 26-yard field goal, 1:40. Vikings 23–22. Drive: 11 plays, 71 yards, 5:26.
- DET – Jason Hanson 48-yard field goal, 0:07. Lions 25–23. Drive: 10 plays, 43 yards, 1:33.

Top passers

- MIN – Jeff George – 10/12, 214 yards, 2 TD, INT
- DET – Gus Frerotte – 15/24, 140 yards

Top rushers

- MIN – Leroy Hoard – 13 rushes, 45 yards, TD
- DET – Greg Hill – 11 rushes, 67 yards

Top receivers

- MIN – Randy Moss – 10 receptions, 125 yards, TD
- DET – Johnnie Morton – 8 receptions, 74 yards

==== Week 7: vs. San Francisco 49ers ====
Week 7: San Francisco 49ers at Minnesota Vikings

Quarter	1	2	3	4	Total
49ers	3	10	3	0	16
Vikings	7	17	7	9	40

at Hubert H. Humphrey Metrodome, Minneapolis, Minnesota

- Date: October 24
- Game time: 12:00 p.m. CDT
- Game weather: None (indoor stadium)
- Game attendance: 64,109
- Referee: Dick Hantak (105)
- TV announcers (FOX): Dick Stockton, Matt Millen, Pam Oliver
- Recap, Game Book

Game information

First quarter

- MIN – Leroy Hoard 1-yard run (Gary Anderson kick), 10:30. Vikings 7–0. Drive: 8 plays, 67 yards, 4:30.
- SF – Wade Richey 22-yard field goal, 2:55. Vikings 7–3. Drive: 14 plays, 76 yards, 7:35.

Second quarter

- SF – Darnell Walker 71-yard fumble return (Wade Richey kick), 14:42. 49ers 10–7.
- MIN – Matthew Hatchette 80-yard pass from Jeff George (Gary Anderson kick), 14:25. Vikings 14–10. Drive: 1 play, 80 yards, 0:17.
- SF – Wade Richey 31-yard field goal, 7:38. Vikings 14–13. Drive: 5 plays, 50 yards, 2:02.
- MIN – Andrew Jordan 7-yard pass from Jeff George (Gary Anderson kick), 1:06. Vikings 21–13. Drive: 6 plays, 40 yards, 2:27.
- MIN – Gary Anderson 33-yard field goal, 0:00. Vikings 24–13. Drive: 1 play, 0 yards, 0:03.

Third quarter

- SF – Wade Richey 26-yard field goal, 8:02. Vikings 24–16. Drive: 15 plays, 72 yards, 6:58.
- MIN – Moe Williams 9-yard run (Gary Anderson kick), 2:54. Vikings 31–16. Drive: 10 plays, 80 yards, 5:08.

Fourth quarter

- MIN – Cris Carter 2-yard pass from Jeff George (Gary Anderson kick), 12:05. Vikings 38–16. Drive: 6 plays, 22 yards, 3:36.
- MIN – Penalty on Chad Fann enforced in the end zone for a safety, 7:20. Vikings 40–16.

Top passers

- SF – Jeff Garcia – 14/31, 188 yards, 2 INT
- MIN – Jeff George – 15/28, 250 yards, 3 TD, INT

Top rushers

- SF – Jeff Garcia – 5 rushes, 35 yards
- MIN – Leroy Hoard – 17 rushes, 105 yards, TD

Top receivers

- SF – Lawrence Phillips – 3 receptions, 49 yards
- MIN – Matthew Hatchette – 2 receptions, 88 yards, TD

==== Week 8: at Denver Broncos ====
Week 8: Minnesota Vikings at Denver Broncos

Quarter	1	2	3	4	Total
Vikings	0	13	0	10	23
Broncos	12	0	0	8	20

at Mile High Stadium, Denver, Colorado

- Date: October 31
- Game time: 2:15 p.m. MST
- Game weather: Sunny, 75 °F (24 °C)
- Game attendance: 75,021
- Referee: Tony Corrente (99)
- TV announcers (FOX): Ray Bentley, Ron Pitts, Drew Goodman
- Recap, Game Book

Game information

First quarter

- DEN – Derek Loville 36-yard run (Jason Elam kick), 12:12. Broncos 7–0. Drive: 7 plays, 70 yards, 2:48.
- DEN – Jeff George sacked in the end zone by Trevor Pryce for a safety, 10:37. Broncos 9–0.
- DEN – Jason Elam 19-yard field goal, 5:59. Broncos 12–0. Drive: 12 plays, 66 yards, 4:38.

Second quarter

- MIN – Orlando Thomas 27-yard interception return (Gary Anderson kick), 7:06. Broncos 12–7.
- MIN – Cris Carter 37-yard pass from Jeff George (pass failed), 3:28. Vikings 13–12. Drive: 4 plays, 63 yards, 2:10.

Third quarter

- No scoring plays.

Fourth quarter

- MIN – Cris Carter 16-yard pass from Jeff George (Gary Anderson kick), 12:45. Vikings 20–12. Drive: 7 plays, 58 yards, 3:13.
- DEN – Byron Chamberlain 1-yard pass from Brian Griese (Olandis Gary run), 5:09. Tied 20–20. Drive: 7 plays, 55 yards, 3:07.
- MIN – Gary Anderson 23-yard field goal, 0:01. Vikings 23–20. Drive: 13 plays, 73 yards, 5:08.

Top passers

- MIN – Jeff George – 17/29, 218 yards, 2 TD
- DEN – Brian Griese – 24/40, 274 yards, TD, INT

Top rushers

- MIN – Leroy Hoard – 18 rushes, 84 yards
- DEN – Olandis Gary – 19 rushes, 79 yards

Top receivers

- MIN – Cris Carter – 8 receptions, 144 yards, 2 TD
- DEN – Rod Smith – 7 receptions, 117 yards

==== Week 9: vs. Dallas Cowboys ====
Week 9: Dallas Cowboys at Minnesota Vikings

Quarter	1	2	3	4	Total
Cowboys	0	17	0	0	17
Vikings	0	7	6	14	27

at Hubert H. Humphrey Metrodome, Minneapolis, Minnesota

- Date: November 8
- Game time: 8:10 p.m. CST
- Game weather: None (indoor stadium)
- Game attendance: 64,111
- Referee: Walt Coleman (65)
- TV announcers (ABC): Al Michaels, Boomer Esiason, Lesley Visser
- Recap, Game Book

Game information

First quarter

- No scoring plays.

Second quarter

- DAL – Richie Cunningham 39-yard field goal, 11:21. Cowboys 3–0. Drive: 7 plays, 42 yards, 3:43.
- DAL – Emmitt Smith 63-yard run (Richie Cunningham kick), 6:21. Cowboys 10–0. Drive: 1 play, 63 yards, 0:10.
- DAL – Emmitt Smith 24-yard run (Richie Cunningham kick), 6:03. Cowboys 17–0. Drive: 1 play, 24 yards, 0:18.
- MIN – Randy Moss 4-yard pass from Jeff George (Gary Anderson kick), 1:53. Cowboys 17–7. Drive: 5 plays, 21 yards, 1:32.

Third quarter

- MIN – Gary Anderson 31-yard field goal, 10:29. Cowboys 17–10. Drive: 10 plays, 57 yards, 4:31.
- MIN – Gary Anderson 40-yard field goal, 4:40. Cowboys 17–13. Drive: 7 plays, 48 yards, 3:44.

Fourth quarter

- MIN – Cris Carter 4-yard pass from Jeff George (Gary Anderson kick), 13:38. Vikings 20–17. Drive: 9 plays, 61 yards, 4:40.
- MIN – Randy Moss 47-yard pass from Jeff George (Gary Anderson kick), 5:10. Vikings 27–17. Drive: 6 plays, 54 yards, 2:58.

Top passers

- DAL – Troy Aikman – 14/24, 129 yards
- MIN – Jeff George – 17/30, 218 yards, 3 TD, INT

Top rushers

- DAL – Emmitt Smith – 13 rushes, 140 yards, 2 TD
- MIN – Leroy Hoard – 21 rushes, 87 yards

Top receivers

- DAL – Raghib Ismail – 7 receptions, 63 yards
- MIN – Cris Carter – 9 receptions, 116 yards, TD

==== Week 10: at Chicago Bears ====
Week 10: Minnesota Vikings at Chicago Bears

Quarter	1	2	3	4	OT	Total
Vikings	7	7	3	7	3	27
Bears	14	3	0	7	0	24

at Soldier Field, Chicago, Illinois

- Date: November 14
- Game time: 12:00 p.m. CST
- Game weather: Mostly sunny, 50 °F (10 °C)
- Game attendance: 66,944
- Referee: Bill Carollo (63)
- TV announcers (FOX): Dick Stockton, Matt Millen, Pam Oliver
- Recap, Game Book

Game information

First quarter

- CHI – Marcus Robinson 77-yard pass from Jim Miller (Chris Boniol kick), 9:43. Bears 7–0. Drive: 1 play, 72 yards, 0:10.
- MIN – Cris Carter 21-yard pass from Jeff George (Gary Anderson kick), 6:41. Tied 7–7. Drive: 5 plays, 66 yards, 3:02.
- CHI – Marty Booker 57-yard pass from Jim Miller (Chris Boniol kick), 4:04. Bears 14–7. Drive: 5 plays, 89 yards, 2:37.

Second quarter

- MIN – Cris Carter 7-yard pass from Jeff George (Gary Anderson kick), 5:58. Tied 14–14. Drive: 1 play, 7 yards, 0:06.
- CHI – Chris Boniol 34-yard field goal, 1:07. Bears 17–14. Drive: 11 plays, 69 yards, 4:51.

Third quarter

- MIN – Gary Anderson 38-yard field goal, 4:55. Tied 17–17. Drive: 7 plays, 25 yards, 3:32.

Fourth quarter

- MIN – Cris Carter 1-yard pass from Jeff George (Gary Anderson kick), 6:06. Vikings 24–17. Drive: 13 plays, 96 yards, 6:42.
- CHI – Marty Booker 25-yard pass from Jim Miller (Chris Boniol kick), 0:49. Tied 24–24. Drive: 9 plays, 87 yards, 2:36.

Overtime

- MIN – Gary Anderson 38-yard field goal, 0:00. Vikings 27–24. Drive: 10 plays, 49 yards, 12:58.

Top passers

- MIN – Jeff George – 25/44, 374 yards, 3 TD, INT
- CHI – Jim Miller – 34/48, 422 yards, 3 TD, INT

Top rushers

- MIN – Robert Smith – 20 rushes, 83 yards
- CHI – Curtis Enis – 19 rushes, 54 yards

Top receivers

- MIN – Randy Moss – 12 receptions, 204 yards
- CHI – Marcus Robinson – 7 receptions, 148 yards, TD

==== Week 12: vs. San Diego Chargers ====
Week 12: San Diego Chargers at Minnesota Vikings

Quarter	1	2	3	4	Total
Chargers	7	0	17	3	27
Vikings	0	28	7	0	35

at Hubert H. Humphrey Metrodome, Minneapolis, Minnesota

- Date: November 28
- Game time: 12:00 p.m. CST
- Game weather: None (indoor stadium)
- Game attendance: 64,232
- Referee: Ron Blum (7)
- TV announcers (CBS): Kevin Harlan, Sam Wyche
- Recap, Game Book

Game information

First quarter

- SD – Tremayne Stephens 1-yard run (John Carney kick), 8:34. Chargers 7–0. Drive: 8 plays, 86 yards, 3:32.

Second quarter

- MIN – Randy Moss 34-yard pass from Jeff George (Gary Anderson kick), 14:55. Tied 7–7. Drive: 8 plays, 77 yards, 4:43.
- MIN – Jake Reed 5-yard pass from Jeff George (Gary Anderson kick), 9:13. Vikings 14–7. Drive: 5 plays, 93 yards, 2:18.
- MIN – Cris Carter 4-yard pass from Jeff George (Gary Anderson kick), 5:55. Vikings 21–7. Drive: 4 plays, 27 yards, 1:27.
- MIN – Leroy Hoard 4-yard run (Gary Anderson kick), 3:44. Vikings 28–7. Drive: 4 plays, 31 yards, 1:21.

Third quarter

- SD – Kenny Bynum 80-yard pass from Jim Harbaugh (John Carney kick), 14:40. Vikings 28–14. Drive: 1 play, 80 yards, 0:20.
- SD – Tremayne Stephens 1-yard run (John Carney kick), 10:33. Vikings 28–21. Drive: 3 plays, 7 yards, 1:03.
- SD – John Carney 40-yard field goal, 7:40. Vikings 28–24. Drive: 6 plays, 37 yards, 1:48.
- MIN – Cris Carter 34-yard pass from Jeff George (Gary Anderson kick), 4:10. Vikings 35–24. Drive: 7 plays, 82 yards, 3:30.

Fourth quarter

- SD – John Carney 40-yard field goal, 11:41. Vikings 35–27. Drive: 8 plays, 43 yards, 1:53.

Top passers

- SD – Jim Harbaugh – 25/39, 404 yards, TD, INT
- MIN – Jeff George – 28/43, 363 yards, 4 TD, 2 INT

Top rushers

- SD – Kenny Bynum – 8 rushes, 26 yards
- MIN – Robert Smith – 20 rushes, 104 yards

Top receivers

- SD – Jeff Graham – 6 receptions, 141 yards
- MIN – Cris Carter – 11 receptions, 136 yards, 2 TD

==== Week 13: at Tampa Bay Buccaneers ====
Week 13: Minnesota Vikings at Tampa Bay Buccaneers

Quarter	1	2	3	4	Total
Vikings	0	14	0	3	17
Buccaneers	7	3	7	7	24

at Raymond James Stadium, Tampa, Florida

- Date: December 6
- Game time: 9:05 p.m. EST
- Game weather: Cool, clear, breezy, 62 °F (17 °C)
- Game attendance: 65,741
- Referee: Jeff Triplette (42)
- TV announcers (ABC): Al Michaels, Boomer Esiason, Lesley Visser
- Recap, Game Book

Game information

First quarter

- TB – Donnie Abraham 55-yard interception return (Martín Gramática kick), 13:31. Buccaneers 7–0.

Second quarter

- TB – Martín Gramática 20-yard field goal, 14:12. Buccaneers 10–0. Drive: 8 plays, 62 yards, 4:37.
- MIN – Leroy Hoard 1-yard run (Gary Anderson kick), 5:52. Buccaneers 10–7. Drive: 5 plays, 22 yards, 2:16.
- MIN – Cris Carter 1-yard pass from Jeff George (Gary Anderson kick), 0:27. Vikings 14–10. Drive: 3 plays, 10 yards, 0:29.

Third quarter

- TB – Jacquez Green 29-yard pass from Shaun King (Martín Gramática kick), 7:14. Buccaneers 17–14. Drive: 6 plays, 57 yards, 3:12.

Fourth quarter

- TB – Dave Moore 1-yard pass from Shaun King (Martín Gramática kick), 11:46. Buccaneers 24–14. Drive: 7 plays, 15 yards, 3:29.
- MIN – Gary Anderson 34-yard field goal, 5:50. Buccaneers 24–17. Drive: 11 plays, 57 yards, 5:56.

Top passers

- MIN – Jeff George – 26/45, 271 yards, TD, 2 INT
- TB – Shaun King – 11/19, 93 yards, 2 TD, INT

Top rushers

- MIN – Robert Smith – 20 rushes, 77 yards
- TB – Mike Alstott – 23 rushes, 95 yards

Top receivers

- MIN – Robert Smith – 5 receptions, 68 yards
- TB – Jacquez Green – 5 receptions, 70 yards

==== Week 14: at Kansas City Chiefs ====
Week 14: Minnesota Vikings at Kansas City Chiefs

Quarter	1	2	3	4	Total
Vikings	0	14	7	7	28
Chiefs	14	7	0	10	31

at Arrowhead Stadium, Kansas City, Missouri

- Date: December 12
- Game time: 7:20 p.m. CST
- Game weather: Mostly cloudy and dark, 41 °F (5 °C)
- Game attendance: 78,932
- Referee: Dick Hantak (105)
- TV announcers (ESPN): Mike Patrick, Paul Maguire, Joe Theismann, Solomon Wilcots
- Recap, Game Book

Game information

First quarter

- KC – Donnell Bennett 2-yard run (Pete Stoyanovich kick), 8:42. Chiefs 7–0. Drive: 9 plays, 47 yards, 4:44.
- KC – Tony Gonzalez 13-yard pass from Elvis Grbac (Pete Stoyanovich kick), 3:09. Chiefs 14–0. Drive: 6 plays, 62 yards, 3:02.

Second quarter

- KC – Tony Gonzalez 9-yard pass from Elvis Grbac (Pete Stoyanovich kick), 13:29. Chiefs 21–0. Drive: 4 plays, 53 yards, 2:49.
- MIN – Robert Tate 76-yard kickoff return (Gary Anderson kick), 13:01. Chiefs 21–7. Drive: 0 plays, 0 yards, 0:28.
- MIN – Matthew Hatchette 8-yard pass from Jeff George (Gary Anderson kick), 0:40. Chiefs 21–14. Drive: 6 plays, 62 yards, 2:25.

Third quarter

- MIN – Randy Moss 12-yard pass from Jeff George (Gary Anderson kick), 4:34. Tied 21–21. Drive: 14 plays, 74 yards, 6:33.

Fourth quarter

- KC – Eric Hicks 44-yard fumble return (Pete Stoyanovich kick), 8:01. Chiefs 28–21.
- MIN – Randy Moss 64-yard punt return (Gary Anderson kick), 1:38. Tied 28–28.
- KC – Pete Stoyanovich 38-yard field goal, 0:03. Chiefs 31–28. Drive: 10 plays, 48 yards, 1:35.

Top passers

- MIN – Jeff George – 13/23, 190 yards, 2 TD
- KC – Elvis Grbac – 19/29, 215 yards, 2 TD

Top rushers

- MIN – Robert Smith – 21 rushes, 118 yards
- KC – Tony Richardson – 11 rushes, 57 yards

Top receivers

- MIN – Randy Moss – 5 receptions, 76 yards, TD
- KC – Joe Horn – 4 receptions, 65 yards

==== Week 15: vs. Green Bay Packers ====
Week 15: Green Bay Packers at Minnesota Vikings

Quarter	1	2	3	4	Total
Packers	0	13	0	7	20
Vikings	0	10	7	7	24

at Hubert H. Humphrey Metrodome, Minneapolis, Minnesota

- Date: December 20
- Game time: 8:15 p.m. CST
- Game weather: None (indoor stadium)
- Game attendance: 64,203
- Referee: Mike Carey (94)
- TV announcers (ABC): Al Michaels, Boomer Esiason, Lesley Visser
- Recap, Game Book

Game information

First quarter

- No scoring plays.

Second quarter

- MIN – Gary Anderson 42-yard field goal, 13:56. Vikings 3–0. Drive: 5 plays, 29 yards, 1:20.
- GB – Dorsey Levens 1-yard run (Ryan Longwell kick), 8:14. Packers 7–3. Drive: 9 plays, 75 yards, 5:42.
- GB – Ryan Longwell 26-yard field goal, 5:21. Packers 10–3. Drive: 7 plays, 15 yards, 2:53.
- MIN – Randy Moss 57-yard pass from Jeff George (Gary Anderson kick), 4:17. Tied 10–10. Drive: 3 plays, 66 yards, 1:04.
- GB – Ryan Longwell 22-yard field goal, 0:03. Packers 13–10. Drive: 11 plays, 69 yards, 4:14.

Third quarter

- MIN – Randy Moss 1-yard pass from Jeff George (Gary Anderson kick), 1:45. Vikings 17–13. Drive: 10 plays, 60 yards, 4:24.

Fourth quarter

- GB – Jeff Thomason 9-yard pass from Matt Hasselbeck (Ryan Longwell kick), 12:31. Packers 20–17. Drive: 5 plays, 37 yards, 2:34.
- MIN – Leroy Hoard 1-yard run (Gary Anderson kick), 8:58. Vikings 24–20. Drive: 7 plays, 64 yards, 3:33.

Top passers

- GB – Brett Favre – 22/39, 229 yards, 2 INT
- MIN – Jeff George – 16/29, 258 yards, 2 TD

Top rushers

- GB – Dorsey Levens – 26 rushes, 99 yards, TD
- MIN – Robert Smith – 19 rushes, 54 yards

Top receivers

- GB – Bill Schroeder – 6 receptions, 71 yards
- MIN – Randy Moss – 5 receptions, 131 yards, 2 TD

==== Week 16: at New York Giants ====
Week 16: Minnesota Vikings at New York Giants

Quarter	1	2	3	4	Total
Vikings	0	14	7	13	34
Giants	3	3	3	8	17

at Giants Stadium, East Rutherford, New Jersey

- Date: December 26
- Game time: 1:00 p.m. EST
- Game weather: Cloudy, 32 °F (0 °C)
- Game attendance: 78,095
- Referee: Johnny Grier (23)
- TV announcers (FOX): Sam Rosen, Bill Maas, Mike Crispino
- Recap, Game Book

Game information

First quarter

- NYG – Cary Blanchard 24-yard field goal, 5:14. Giants 3–0. Drive: 15 plays, 65 yards, 8:35.

Second quarter

- MIN – Leroy Hoard 3-yard run (Gary Anderson kick), 11:59. Vikings 7–3. Drive: 6 plays, 83 yards, 2:48.
- NYG – Cary Blanchard 43-yard field goal, 7:50. Vikings 7–6. Drive: 8 plays, 43 yards, 4:09.
- MIN – Leroy Hoard 1-yard run (Gary Anderson kick), 0:27. Vikings 14–6. Drive: 8 plays, 67 yards, 3:42.

Third quarter

- MIN – Cris Carter 27-yard pass from Randy Moss (Gary Anderson kick), 4:29. Vikings 21–6. Drive: 1 play, 27 yards, 0:08.
- NYG – Cary Blanchard 42-yard field goal, 0:00. Vikings 21–9. Drive: 11 plays, 50 yards, 4:29.

Fourth quarter

- MIN – Moe Williams 85-yard kickoff return (Gary Anderson kick), 14:44. Vikings 28–9. Drive: 0 plays, 0 yards, 0:16.
- NYG – Pete Mitchell 1-yard pass from Kerry Collins (Kerry Collins run), 7:45. Vikings 28–17. Drive: 16 plays, 69 yards, 6:59.
- MIN – Robert Smith 70-yard run (pass failed), 7:23. Vikings 34–9. Drive: 1 play, 70 yards, 0:22.

Top passers

- MIN – Jeff George – 10/21, 185 yards, 2 INT
- NYG – Kerry Collins – 31/51, 297 yards, TD, INT

Top rushers

- MIN – Robert Smith – 16 rushes, 146 yards, TD
- NYG – Joe Montgomery – 19 rushes, 55 yards

Top receivers

- MIN – Cris Carter – 5 receptions, 131 yards, TD
- NYG – Amani Toomer – 9 receptions, 99 yards

==== Week 17: vs. Detroit Lions ====
Week 17: Detroit Lions at Minnesota Vikings

Quarter	1	2	3	4	Total
Lions	7	3	0	7	17
Vikings	7	10	0	7	24

at Hubert H. Humphrey Metrodome, Minneapolis, Minnesota

- Date: January 2
- Game time: 12:00 p.m. CST
- Game weather: None (indoor stadium)
- Game attendance: 64,103
- Referee: Tony Corrente (99)
- TV announcers (FOX): Pat Summerall, John Madden, D.J. Johnson
- Recap, Game Book

Game information

First quarter

- MIN – Robert Smith 4-yard run (Gary Anderson kick), 9:12. Vikings 7–0. Drive: 3 plays, 65 yards, 1:30.
- DET – Johnnie Morton 6-yard pass from Charlie Batch (Jason Hanson kick), 0:55. Tied 7–7. Drive: 14 plays, 80 yards, 8:17.

Second quarter

- MIN – Gary Anderson 44-yard field goal, 12:53. Vikings 10–7. Drive: 7 plays, 17 yards, 3:02.
- DET – Jason Hanson 39-yard field goal, 7:12. Tied 10–10. Drive: 12 plays, 39 yards, 5:41.
- MIN – Randy Moss 67-yard pass from Jeff George (Gary Anderson kick), 5:44. Vikings 17–10. Drive: 3 plays, 86 yards, 1:28.

Third quarter

- No scoring plays.

Fourth quarter

- MIN – Leroy Hoard 3-yard run (Gary Anderson kick), 4:56. Vikings 24–10. Drive: 10 plays, 70 yards, 6:05.
- DET – Johnnie Morton 36-yard pass from Gus Frerotte (Jason Hanson kick), 2:16. Vikings 24–17. Drive: 8 plays, 76 yards, 2:40.

Top passers

- DET – Gus Frerotte – 14/22, 180 yards, TD, INT
- MIN – Jeff George – 14/24, 275 yards, TD, 2 INT

Top rushers

- DET – Cory Schlesinger – 3 rushes, 10 yards
- MIN – Robert Smith – 22 rushes, 97 yards, TD

Top receivers

- DET – Johnnie Morton – 10 receptions, 128 yards, 2 TD
- MIN – Randy Moss – 5 receptions, 155 yards, TD

=== Standings ===
NFC Central
	W	L	T	PCT	PF	PA	STK
^{(2)} Tampa Bay Buccaneers	11	5	0	.688	270	235	W2
^{(4)} Minnesota Vikings	10	6	0	.625	399	335	W3
^{(6)} Detroit Lions	8	8	0	.500	322	323	L4
Green Bay Packers	8	8	0	.500	357	341	W1
Chicago Bears	6	10	0	.375	272	341	L2

== Postseason ==
=== Schedule ===
Round	Date	Opponent	Result	Record	Venue	Attendance
Wild Card	January 9	Dallas Cowboys	W 27–10	1–0	Hubert H. Humphrey Metrodome	64,056
Division	January 16	at St. Louis Rams	L 37–49	1–1	Trans World Dome	66,194

=== Game summaries ===
==== NFC Wild Card Round: vs (#5) Dallas Cowboys ====
NFC Wild Card Round: (#5) Dallas Cowboys at (#4) Minnesota Vikings – Game summary

Quarter	1	2	3	4	Total
Cowboys	10	0	0	0	10
Vikings	3	14	3	7	27

at Hubert H. Humphrey Metrodome, Minneapolis, Minnesota

- Date: January 9
- Game time: 11:35 a.m. CST
- Game weather: None (indoor stadium)
- Game attendance: 64,056
- Referee: Gerry Austin (34)
- TV announcers (FOX): Pat Summerall, John Madden, Ron Pitts, D.J. Johnson
- Recap, Game Book

Game information

First quarter

- DAL – Eddie Murray 18-yard field goal, 11:09. Cowboys 3–0. Drive: 7 plays, 78 yards, 3:51.
- MIN – Gary Anderson 47-yard field goal, 7:59. Tied 3–3. Drive: 4 plays, 1 yard, 1:59.
- DAL – Emmitt Smith 5-yard run (Eddie Murray kick), 5:00. Cowboys 10–3. Drive: 7 plays, 79 yards, 2:59.

Second quarter

- MIN – Robert Smith 26-yard pass from Jeff George (Gary Anderson kick), 9:21. Tied 10–10. Drive: 4 plays, 23 yards, 2:23.
- MIN – Randy Moss 58-yard pass from Jeff George (Gary Anderson kick), 0:28. Vikings 17–10. Drive: 6 plays, 82 yards, 1:58.

Third quarter

- MIN – Gary Anderson 38-yard field goal, 3:10. Vikings 20–10. Drive: 10 plays, 60 yards, 5:01.

Fourth quarter

- MIN – Cris Carter 5-yard pass from Jeff George (Gary Anderson kick), 12:40. Vikings 27–10. Drive: 7 plays, 67 yards, 3:49.

Top passers

- DAL – Troy Aikman – 22/38, 286 yards, INT
- MIN – Jeff George – 12/25, 212 yards, 3 TD

Top rushers

- DAL – Emmitt Smith – 15 rushes, 99 yards, TD
- MIN – Robert Smith – 28 rushes, 140 yards

Top receivers

- DAL – Raghib Ismail – 8 receptions, 163 yards
- MIN – Randy Moss – 5 receptions, 127 yards, TD

==== NFC Divisional Round: vs (#1) St. Louis Rams ====
NFC Divisional Playoffs: (#4) Minnesota Vikings at (#1) St. Louis Rams – Game summary

Quarter	1	2	3	4	Total
Vikings	3	14	0	20	37
Rams	14	0	21	14	49

at Trans World Dome, St. Louis, Missouri

- Date: January 16
- Game time: 11:35 a.m. CST
- Game weather: None (indoor stadium)
- Game attendance: 66,194
- Referee: Walt Coleman (65)
- TV announcers (FOX): Pat Summerall, John Madden, Ron Pitts, D.J. Johnson
- Recap, Game Book

Game information

First quarter

- MIN – Gary Anderson 31-yard field goal, 9:23. Vikings 3–0. Drive: 11 plays, 60 yards, 5:37.
- STL – Isaac Bruce 77-yard pass from Kurt Warner (Jeff Wilkins kick), 9:02. Rams 7–3. Drive: 1 play, 77 yards, 0:21.
- STL – Marshall Faulk 41-yard pass from Kurt Warner (Jeff Wilkins kick), 4:19. Rams 14–3. Drive: 4 plays, 82 yards, 1:55.

Second quarter

- MIN – Cris Carter 22-yard pass from Jeff George (Gary Anderson kick), 9:53. Rams 14–10. Drive: 8 plays, 96 yards, 3:42.
- MIN – Leroy Hoard 4-yard run (Gary Anderson kick), 2:40. Vikings 17–14. Drive: 7 plays, 53 yards, 3:43.

Third quarter

- STL – Tony Horne 95-yard kickoff return (Jeff Wilkins kick), 14:42. Rams 21–17. Drive: 0 plays, 0 yards, 0:18.
- STL – Marshall Faulk 1-yard run (Jeff Wilkins kick), 8:28. Rams 28–17. Drive: 9 plays, 51 yards, 4:59.
- STL – Jeff Robinson 13-yard pass from Kurt Warner (Jeff Wilkins kick), 0:22. Rams 35–17. Drive: 8 plays, 61 yards, 4:23.

Fourth quarter

- STL – Ryan Tucker 1-yard pass from Kurt Warner (Jeff Wilkins kick), 13:36. Rams 42–17. Drive: 4 plays, 23 yards, 1:33.
- STL – Roland Williams 2-yard pass from Kurt Warner (Jeff Wilkins kick), 8:13. Rams 49–17. Drive: 8 plays, 62 yards, 4:01.
- MIN – Jake Reed 4-yard pass from Jeff George (Leroy Hoard run), 4:56. Rams 49–25. Drive: 6 plays, 80 yards, 3:17.
- MIN – Randy Moss 44-yard pass from Jeff George (pass failed), 3:48. Rams 49–31. Drive: 5 plays, 63 yards, 1:08.
- MIN – Randy Moss 2-yard pass from Jeff George (pass failed), 0:31. Rams 49–37. Drive: 16 plays, 85 yards, 2:09.

Top passers

- MIN – Jeff George – 29/50, 423 yards, 4 TD, INT
- STL – Kurt Warner – 27/33, 391 yards, 5 TD, INT

Top rushers

- MIN – Robert Smith – 20 rushes, 64 yards
- STL – Marshall Faulk – 11 rushes, 21 yards, TD

Top receivers

- MIN – Randy Moss – 9 receptions, 188 yards, 2 TD
- STL – Isaac Bruce – 4 receptions, 133 yards, TD

== Statistics ==
=== Team leaders ===
Category	Player(s)	Value
Passing yards	Jeff George	2,816
Passing touchdowns	Jeff George	23
Rushing yards	Robert Smith	1,015
Rushing touchdowns	Leroy Hoard	10
Receiving yards	Randy Moss	1,413
Receiving touchdowns	Cris Carter	13
Points	Gary Anderson	103
Kickoff return yards	Robert Tate	627
Punt return yards	Randy Moss	162
Tackles	Robert Griffith	128
Sacks	John Randle	10
Interceptions	Robert Griffith	3
Forced fumbles	John Randle	4

=== League rankings ===
Category	Total yards	Yards per game	NFL rank (out of 31)
Passing offense	3,989	249.3	5th
Rushing offense	1,804	112.8	14th
Total offense	5,793	362.1	3rd
Passing defense	3,980	248.8	30th
Rushing defense	1,617	101.1	14th
Total defense	5,597	349.8	27th
