= 1999 Atlanta Falcons season =

NFL team season

- Owner: Taylor Smith
- General manager: Harold Richardson
- Head coach: Dan Reeves
- Offensive coordinator: George Sefcik
- Defensive coordinator: Rich Brooks
- Home stadium: Georgia Dome

Results
- Record: 5–11
- Division place: 3rd NFC West
- Playoffs: Did not qualify
- Pro Bowlers: None

The 1999 season was the Atlanta Falcons' 34th in the National Football League (NFL). They finished with a 5–11 record, some way short of the 14–2 record they managed in the previous season, and failed to reach the playoffs, which meant they would not be the first team to play in the Super Bowl at their own stadium. The Falcons and their Super Bowl XXXIII opponent, the Denver Broncos, managed an aggregate 11–21 record between them; it was the worst combined record by two teams the year after they reached the Super Bowl until the Oakland Raiders and the Tampa Bay Buccaneers in 2003.

The season saw star running back Jamal Anderson hurt his knee in Week 2 and be subsequently placed on injured reserve, ending his season and any hope of the Falcons matching their 1998 form. The injury that Anderson suffered was career-threatening.

== Offseason ==
=== Free agents ===
Position	Player	Free agency tag	1999 team
DB	Darren Anderson	UFA	
DB	Ronnie Bradford	UFA	Atlanta Falcons
DE	John Burrough	UFA	Minnesota Vikings
DB	Devin Bush	UFA	St. Louis Rams
QB	Steve DeBerg	UFA	Retired
DE	Antonio Edwards	UFA	Carolina Panthers
WR	Ronnie Harris	UFA	Atlanta Falcons
WR	Todd Kinchen	UFA	Carolina Panthers
C	Adam Schreiber	UFA	Atlanta Falcons
LB	Ben Talley	RFA	Atlanta Falcons
DE	Esera Tuaolo	UFA	Carolina Panthers
DB	William White	UFA	

Additions	Subtractions
G Greg Bishop (Giants)	LB Cornelius Bennett (Colts)
WR Chris Calloway (Giants)	WR Tony Martin (Dolphins)
S Marty Carter (Bears)	
QB Danny Kanell (Giants)
S Gerald McBurrows (Rams)
LB Pellom McDaniels (Chiefs)

=== NFL draft ===
1999 Atlanta Falcons draft
Round	Pick	Player	Position	College	Notes
1	30	Patrick Kerney *	Defensive end	Virginia	
2	42	Reggie Kelly *	Tight end	Mississippi State	
3	92	Jeff Paulk	Fullback	Arizona State	
4	126	Johndale Carty	Defensive back	Utah State	
5	164	Eugene Baker	Wide receiver	Kent State	
6	198	Jeff Kelly	Linebacker	Kansas State	
6	200	Eric Thigpen	Defensive back	Iowa	
7	237	Todd McClure	Center	LSU	
7	247	Rondel Menendez	Wide receiver	Eastern Kentucky	
Made roster * Made at least one Pro Bowl during career

== Personnel ==
1999 Atlanta Falcons staff
Front office: President – Taylor Smith; Executive vice-president of football operations – Dan Reeves; General manager – Harold Richardson; Vice-president of football operations – Ron Hill; Director of player personnel/College – Reed Johnson; Director of player personnel/Pro – Chuck Connor; Assistant to head coach/pro personnel – Marvin Bass; Head coaches: Head coach – Dan Reeves; Assistant head coach/defensive coordinator – Rich Brooks; Offensive coaches: Offensive coordinator/running backs – George Sefcik; Passing Game/Play Calling – Jack Burns; Quarterbacks – Steve DeBerg; Wide receivers – Rennie Simmons; Tight ends – James Daniel; Offensive line – Art Shell; Offensive quality control – Ed West	Defensive coaches: Defensive line – Bill Kollar; Linebackers – Don Blackmon; Secondary – Ron Meeks; Defensive quality control – Brian Xanders; Special teams coaches: Special teams – Joe DeCamillis; Strength and conditioning: Strength and conditioning – Al Miller; Assistant strength and conditioning – Rocky Colburn

== Roster ==
1999 Atlanta Falcons roster
Quarterbacks (QB): 12 Chris Chandler; 7 Tony Graziani; 14 Wally Richardson; Running backs (RB): 44 Bob Christian FB; 24 Byron Hanspard; 33 Winslow Oliver; 28 Ken Oxendine; 40 Jeff Paulk FB; Wide receivers (WR): 15 Eugene Baker; 80 Chris Calloway; 83 Tim Dwight; 87 Jammi German; 82 Ronnie Harris; 81 Terance Mathis; Tight ends (TE): 89 Reggie Kelly; 85 Brian Kozlowski; 84 Rod Monroe; 88 O. J. Santiago	Offensive linemen (OL): 65 Greg Bishop G; 68 Calvin Collins G; 64 Bob Hallen G; 63 Evan Pilgrim G; 76 Jose Portilla T; 74 Ephraim Salaam T; 61 Robbie Tobeck C; 70 Bob Whitfield T; 69 Gene Williams G; Defensive linemen (DL): 92 Lester Archambeau DE; 75 Shane Dronett DT; 98 Travis Hall DT; 91 Ben Huff DT; 95 Ed Jasper DT; 97 Patrick Kerney DE; 77 Pellom McDaniels DE; 90 Chuck Smith DE; 93 Shawn Swayda DT	Linebackers (LB): 56 Keith Brooking OLB; 94 Henri Crockett OLB; 51 Jeff Kelly MLB; 52 Craig Sauer OLB; 58 Jessie Tuggle MLB; Defensive backs (DB): 20 Michael Booker SS; 23 Ronnie Bradford CB; 27 Omar Brown FS; 34 Ray Buchanan CB; 35 Johndale Carty SS; 30 Derrick Gardner CB; 22 Gerald McBurrows SS; 41 Eugene Robinson FS; 21 Elijah Williams CB; Special teams (ST): 5 Morten Andersen K; 55 Whit Marshall LS; 4 Dan Stryzinski P	Practice squad: 79 Emil Ekiyor G; 86 Brian Finneran WR; 72 Adam Hernandez T; 50 Brian Smith LB; Reserve: 32 Jamal Anderson RB (IR); 25 Marty Carter S (IR); 45 Gary Downs RB (IR); 54 Ruffin Hamilton LB (IR); 13 Danny Kanell QB (IR); 62 Todd McClure C (IR); 53 active, 6 inactive, 4 practice squad Rookies in italics

== Schedule ==
Week	Date	Opponent	Result	Record	Venue	Attendance
1	September 12	Minnesota Vikings	**L** 14–17	0–1	Georgia Dome	69,555
2	September 20	at Dallas Cowboys	**L** 7–24	0–2	Texas Stadium	63,663
3	September 26	at **St. Louis Rams**	**L** 7–35	0–3	Trans World Dome	63,253
4	October 3	Baltimore Ravens	**L** 13–19 (OT)	0–4	Georgia Dome	50,712
5	October 10	at **New Orleans Saints**	**W** 20–17	1–4	Louisiana Superdome	57,289
6	October 17	**St. Louis Rams**	**L** 13–41	1–5	Georgia Dome	51,973
7	October 25	at Pittsburgh Steelers	**L** 9–13	1–6	Three Rivers Stadium	58,141
8	October 31	**Carolina Panthers**	**W** 27–20	2–6	Georgia Dome	52,594
9	November 7	Jacksonville Jaguars	**L** 7–30	2–7	Georgia Dome	68,466
10	Bye					
11	November 21	at Tampa Bay Buccaneers	**L** 10–19	2–8	Raymond James Stadium	65,158
12	November 28	at **Carolina Panthers**	**L** 28–34	2–9	Ericcson Stadium	55,507
13	December 5	**New Orleans Saints**	**W** 35–12	3–9	Georgia Dome	62,568
14	December 12	at **San Francisco 49ers**	**L** 7–26	3–10	3Com Park	67,465
15	December 19	at Tennessee Titans	**L** 17–30	3–11	Adelphia Coliseum	66,196
16	December 26	Arizona Cardinals	**W** 37–14	4–11	Georgia Dome	47,074
17	January 3	**San Francisco 49ers**	**W** 34–29	5–11	Georgia Dome	57,980
Note: Intra-division opponents are in **bold** text.

== Standings ==
NFC West
	W	L	T	PCT	PF	PA	STK
^{(1)} St. Louis Rams	13	3	0	.813	526	242	L1
Carolina Panthers	8	8	0	.500	421	381	W1
Atlanta Falcons	5	11	0	.313	285	380	W2
San Francisco 49ers	4	12	0	.250	295	453	L3
New Orleans Saints	3	13	0	.188	260	434	L1
