= Tim Connolly (American football) =

American business executive

Career information
- College: George Washington University

Career history
- Kansas City Chiefs (1989–1993) Executive vice president; Kansas City Chiefs (1994) Chief operating officer; Minnesota Vikings (1998–1999) General manager; Jacksonville Jaguars (2003–2009) Senior vice president for business development; Green Bay Packers (2010–2013) Vice president of sales and marketing
- Executive profile at Pro Football Reference

Timothy M. Connolly is an American business executive was a senior executive for four National Football League teams. Prior to working in sports, Connolly was the CEO of Bell Atlantic Mobile Systems.

== Early life ==
Connolly is son of a United States Navy Chief Boatswain's Mate and dive instructor and spent his childhood living in San Diego, Boston, Naples, Muskogee, Oklahoma, and Norfolk, Virginia before settling down in Washington, D.C. After two years at the University of Alabama,Connolly transferred to George Washington University, where he graduated with a degree in finance and marketing in 1971.

== Career ==
=== Early career ===
Connolly began his business career as a salesman for IBM, where he worked his way up to sales management. He left IBM to start Top Performers, a sports agency. He sold the firm in 1983 to become vice president for sales and marketing for American Sign & Indicator, the world's largest manufacturer of scoreboards. Connolly led the company's effort to win the contract to provide scoreboards for the 1984 Summer Olympics.

=== Bell Atlantic ===
In July 1985, Connolly joined A Beeper Co., a Bell Atlantic subsidiary that provided and serviced paging equipment, as vice president of sales and marketing. He was named president and chief executive officer of Bell Atlantic Mobile Systems and presided over the company during a period of robust growth. In 1988, Connolly was appointed president and chief operating officer at Sorbus, another Bell Atlantic subsidiary.

=== Kansas City Chiefs ===
In 1988, Kansas City Chiefs general manager Carl Peterson hired Connolly to help the team with marketing. Under Peterson and Connolly, the Chiefs worked to improve the gameday experience by stressing pre-game entertainment and tailgating. They also sought to make the team more accessible by putting its games on FM radio station and having players travel in caravans to neighboring states. Season ticket sales increased by 5,269 in Connolly's first year in Kansas City, then by 7,862, 13,142 and 12,733 in the three years before the team cut it off at 65,000. Connolly also oversaw an oversee a number of administrative changes, including hiring a new director of public relations, director of finance, director of marketing, director of sales, and director of stadium operations. In 1994 he was given the title of chief operating officer. In 1995, he left the Chiefs to join Ameritech as senior vice president and head of its Worldwide Network Systems sector. However, he returned to work for Chiefs owner Lamar Hunt as president of the Hunt Sports Group, which oversees Hunt's other sports holdings.

=== Minnesota Vikings ===
On October 26, 1998, Connolly was named executive vice president and general manager of the Minnesota Vikings. Connolly oversaw the team's day-to-day operations and led its efforts to replace the Hubert H. Humphrey Metrodome. However, unlike most general managers, he did not have a say in football operations, which were handled by Jeff Diamond, Dennis Green, and Rob Brzezinski. Connolly resigned on January 24, 2000. After leaving, Minnesota, Connolly joined an equity firm that attempted to purchase the National Hockey League's Phoenix Coyotes.

=== Jacksonville Jaguars ===
In 2003, the Jacksonville Jaguars hired Connolly to sell ticket and amenity packages for Super Bowl XXXIX. The project netted the team $30 million and led Wayne Weaver to hire Connolly as the team's senior vice president for business development.

=== Green Bay Packers ===
In 2010, Connolly was hired by the Green Bay Packers to be the team's vice president of sales and marketing. He oversaw marketing, sponsorships, retail operations, premium sales, and guest services.

=== QuintEvents ===
In 2014, Connolly joined QuintEvents, a travel, experience and hospitality provider, as a principal.
