= Robert Tate (American football) =

American football player (born 1973)

No. 83, 28, 22, 26
- Position: Cornerback

Personal information
- Born: October 19, 1973 (age 53); Harrisburg, Pennsylvania, U.S.
- Listed height: 5 ft 10 in (1.78 m)
- Listed weight: 193 lb (88 kg)

Career information
- College: Cincinnati
- NFL draft: 1997: 6th round, 183rd overall pick

Career history
- Minnesota Vikings (1997–2001); Baltimore Ravens (2002); Arizona Cardinals (2004–2006)

Awards and highlights
- C-USA Offensive Player of the Year (1995); C-USA Special Teams POY (1995)

Career NFL statistics
- Tackles: 222
- Interceptions: 5
- Forced fumbles: 4
- Stats at Pro Football Reference

Robert Tate (born October 19, 1973) is an American former professional football player who was a cornerback and return specialist for nine seasons in the National Football League (NFL). He was selected in the sixth round of the 1997 NFL draft. Tate played in the NFL with the Minnesota Vikings, Baltimore Ravens and Arizona Cardinals. Tate played college football for the Cincinnati Bearcats. Originally a wide receiver, he was converted to cornerback upon entering the NFL. Tate played at Cincinnati with notable NFL players Artrell Hawkins, Sam Garnes, and Jason Fabini.

== NFL career statistics ==
Legend
**Bold**	Career high

=== Regular season ===
Year	Team	Games		Tackles				Interceptions				Fumbles			
Year	Team	GP	GS	Comb	Solo	Ast	Sck	Int	Yds	TD	Lng	FF	FR	Yds	TD
1997	MIN	4	0	0	0	0	0.0	0	0	0	0	0	0	0	0
1998	MIN	15	1	0	0	0	0.0	0	0	0	0	0	0	0	0
1999	MIN	16	1	17	16	1	0.0	1	18	0	18	0	0	0	0
2000	MIN	16	16	**72**	**60**	**12**	0.0	**2**	12	0	12	**2**	**1**	0	0
2001	MIN	16	5	44	37	7	0.0	0	0	0	0	0	0	0	0
2002	BAL	13	1	23	20	3	0.0	0	0	0	0	0	0	0	0
2004	ARI	14	0	20	17	3	0.0	0	0	0	0	1	0	0	0
2005	ARI	13	5	38	36	2	0.0	**2**	**47**	0	**25**	1	0	0	0
2006	ARI	9	0	8	8	0	0.0	0	0	0	0	0	0	0	0
Career		116	29	222	194	28	0.0	5	77	0	25	4	1	0	0

=== Playoffs ===
Year	Team	Games		Tackles				Interceptions				Fumbles			
Year	Team	GP	GS	Comb	Solo	Ast	Sck	Int	Yds	TD	Lng	FF	FR	Yds	TD
1998	MIN	1	0	0	0	0	0.0	0	0	0	0	0	0	0	0
1999	MIN	2	1	4	4	0	0.0	0	0	0	0	0	0	0	0
2000	MIN	2	2	**8**	**7**	**1**	0.0	**2**	**5**	0	**4**	**1**	0	0	0
Career		5	3	12	11	1	0.0	2	5	0	4	1	0	0	0
