= 2000 Pro Bowl =

National Football League all-star game

2000 NFL Pro Bowl
NFC	AFC
51	31
Head coach: Tony Dungy (Tampa Bay Buccaneers)	Head coach: Tom Coughlin (Jacksonville Jaguars)
	1	2	3	4	Total
NFC	10	17	10	14	51
AFC	7	14	0	10	31
- Date: February 6, 2000
- Stadium: Aloha Stadium; Honolulu, Hawaii
- MVP: Randy Moss (Minnesota Vikings)
- Referee: Tom White
- Attendance: 50,112

TV in the United States
- Network: ABC
- Announcers: Al Michaels, Boomer Esiason, Lesley Visser and Dan Fouts

The 2000 Pro Bowl was the NFL's all-star game for the 1999 season. The game was played on February 6, 2000, at Aloha Stadium in Honolulu, Hawaii. The game was broadcast by ABC with a running time of three hours and sixteen minutes. The final score was NFC 51, AFC 31. The AFC coach was Tom Coughlin of Jacksonville. The NFC coach was Tony Dungy of Tampa Bay. Randy Moss of the Minnesota Vikings was the game's MVP with 9 catches for 212 yards and one touchdown.

The referee was Tom White. The game had an attendance of 50,112.

== Scoring summary ==
The scores broken down by quarter:

- 1st Quarter
  - NFC—Aeneas Williams 62-yd interception return (Jason Hanson kick), 12:14; 7-0 NFC
  - NFC—Hanson 21-yd FG, 4:24; 10-0 NFC
  - AFC—Jimmy Smith 5-yd pass from Mark Brunell (Olindo Mare kick), 0:30. 10-7 NFC
- 2nd Quarter
  - NFC—Mike Alstott 1-yd run (Hanson kick), 12:57; 17-7 NFC
  - AFC—Tony Gonzalez 10-yd pass from Rich Gannon (Mare kick), 10:05; 17-14 NFC
  - NFC—Alstott 3-yd run (Hanson kick), 4:45; 24-14 NFC
  - AFC—Smith 21-yd pass from Peyton Manning (Mare kick), 0:20; 24-21 NFC
  - NFC—Hanson 51-yd FG, 0:00. 27-21 NFC
- 3rd Quarter
  - NFC—Alstott 1-yd run (Hanson kick), 7:08; 34-21 NFC
  - NFC—Hanson 23-yd FG, 2:03. 37-21 NFC
- 4th Quarter
  - AFC—Mare 33-yd FG, 14:49; 37-24 NFC
  - NFC—Derrick Brooks 20-yd interception return (Hanson kick), 11:12: 44-24 NFC
  - AFC—Smith 52-yd pass from Manning (Mare kick), 6:30; 44-31 NFC
  - NFC—Randy Moss 25-yd pass from Steve Beuerlein (Hanson kick), 1:05. 51-31 NFC

== Starting Lineups ==
Starting Lineups as voted on by NFL players and coaches

== AFC roster ==
=== Offense ===
Position:	Starters:	Reserves:	Alternates:
Quarterback	18 Peyton Manning, Indianapolis	8 Mark Brunell, Jacksonville; 12 Rich Gannon, Oakland	
Running back	32 Edgerrin James, Indianapolis	28 Corey Dillon, Cincinnati; 27 Eddie George, Tennessee	
Fullback	33 Sam Gash, Buffalo		
Wide receiver	88 Marvin Harrison, Indianapolis; 82 Jimmy Smith, Jacksonville	19 Keyshawn Johnson, N.Y. Jets; 81 Tim Brown, Oakland^{[b]}	88 Terry Glenn, New England^{[a]}
Tight end	88 Tony Gonzalez, Kansas City	89 Frank Wycheck, Tennessee	
Offensive tackle	75 Jonathan Ogden, Baltimore; 71 Tony Boselli, Jacksonville^{[b]}	72 Leon Searcy, Jacksonville^{[c]}	71 Walter Jones, Seattle^{[a]}
Offensive guard	79 Ruben Brown, Buffalo; 74 Bruce Matthews, Tennessee	68 Will Shields, Kansas City	
Center	66 Tom Nalen, Denver^{[b]}	68 Kevin Mawae, N.Y. Jets^{[c]}	61 Tim Grunhard, Kansas City^{[a]}

=== Defense ===
Position:	Starters:	Reserves:	Alternates:
Defensive end	90 Tony Brackens, Jacksonville; 90 Jevon Kearse, Tennessee	99 Michael McCrary, Baltimore	
Defensive tackle	93 Trevor Pryce, Denver; 96 Darrell Russell, Oakland	96 Cortez Kennedy, Seattle	
Outside linebacker	58 Peter Boulware, Baltimore; 51 Kevin Hardy, Jacksonville	94 Chad Brown, Seattle^{[b]}	57 Mo Lewis, N. Y. Jets^{[a]}
Inside linebacker	52 Ray Lewis, Baltimore^{[b]}	54 Zach Thomas, Miami^{[c]}	55 Junior Seau, San Diego^{[a]}
Cornerback	29 Sam Madison, Miami; 24 Charles Woodson, Oakland	40 James Hasty, Kansas City	
Free safety	37 Carnell Lake, Jacksonville	26 Rod Woodson, Baltimore	
Strong safety	36 Lawyer Milloy, New England		

=== Special teams ===
Position:	Player:	Alternates:
Punter	7 Tom Tupa, N.Y. Jets	
Placekicker	10 Olindo Mare, Miami	
Kick returner	34 Tremain Mack, Cincinnati	
Special teamer	42 Detron Smith, Denver	

== NFC roster ==
=== Offense ===
Position:	Starters:	Reserves:	Alternates:
Quarterback	13 Kurt Warner, St. Louis	7 Steve Beuerlein, Carolina; 14 Brad Johnson, Washington	
Running back	28 Marshall Faulk, St. Louis	22 Emmitt Smith, Dallas; 48 Stephen Davis, Washington	
Fullback	40 Mike Alstott, Tampa Bay		
Wide receiver	80 Cris Carter, Minnesota; 80 Isaac Bruce, St. Louis	87 Muhsin Muhammad, Carolina; 84 Randy Moss, Minnesota	
Tight end	85 Wesley Walls, Carolina	86 David Sloan, Detroit	
Offensive tackle	77 Willie Roaf, New Orleans; 76 Orlando Pace, St. Louis	79 Erik Williams, Dallas	
Offensive guard	73 Larry Allen, Dallas; 64 Randall McDaniel, Minnesota	77 Tré Johnson, Washington	
Center	62 Jeff Christy, Minnesota	61 Tony Mayberry, Tampa Bay	

=== Defense ===
Position:	Starters:	Reserves:	Alternates:
Defensive end	92 Michael Strahan, N.Y. Giants; 93 Kevin Carter, St. Louis^{[b]}	91 Robert Porcher, Detroit^{[c]}	97 Simeon Rice, Arizona^{[a]}
Defensive tackle	94 Luther Elliss, Detroit; 99 Warren Sapp, Tampa Bay	75 D'Marco Farr, St. Louis	
Outside linebacker	98 Jessie Armstead, N.Y. Giants; 55 Derrick Brooks, Tampa Bay	52 Dexter Coakley, Dallas	
Inside linebacker	56 Hardy Nickerson, Tampa Bay	57 Stephen Boyd, Detroit	
Cornerback	21 Deion Sanders, Dallas^{[b]} 41 Todd Lyght, St. Louis	35 Aeneas Williams, Arizona^{[c]}	23 Troy Vincent, Philadelphia^{[a]}
Free safety	30 Lance Schulters, San Francisco	20 Brian Dawkins, Philadelphia	
Strong safety	47 John Lynch, Tampa Bay		

=== Special teams ===
Position:	Player:	Alternates:
Punter	17 Mitch Berger, Minnesota	
Placekicker	4 Jason Hanson, Detroit	
Kick returner	24 Glyn Milburn, Chicago	
Special teamer	84 Michael Bates, Carolina	

Notes:

^{a} Replacement selection due to injury or vacancy
^{b} Injured player; selected but did not play
^{c} Replacement starter; selected as reserve

== 2000 Pro Bowl Cheerleading Squad ==
- Katie Currier, Arizona Cardinals
- Jillian Edwards, Atlanta Falcons
- Meah Pace, Baltimore Ravens
- Julie F, Buffalo Bills
- Nicole Price, Carolina Panthers
- Nikki Lanzetta, Cincinnati Bengals
- Megan Willsey, Dallas Cowboys
- Marie Nesbitt, Denver Broncos
- Carrie Vogel, Indianapolis Colts
- Stephanie Archibald, Jacksonville Jaguars
- Rosie Hannan, Kansas City Chiefs
- Suzanne Bierwith, Miami Dolphins
- Angela Parkos, Minnesota Vikings
- Kalen Mace, New England Patriots
- Lani Quagliano, New Orleans Saints
- Patty Herrera, Oakland Raiders
- Cheryl Williams, Philadelphia Eagles
- Michelle Steptoe, St. Louis Rams
- Susan Macy, San Diego Chargers
- Antoinette Bertolani, San Francisco 49ers
- Angela Adto, Seattle Seahawks
- Kristin Turner, Tampa Bay Buccaneers

== Number of selections per team ==
AFC team	Selections	NFC team	Selections
Jacksonville Jaguars	7	St. Louis Rams	7
Baltimore Ravens	5	Tampa Bay Buccaneers	6
Tennessee Titans	4	Minnesota Vikings	5
Kansas City Chiefs	4	Dallas Cowboys	5
Oakland Raiders	4	Detroit Lions	5
New York Jets	4	Carolina Panthers	4
Indianapolis Colts	3	Washington Redskins	3
Miami Dolphins	3	Arizona Cardinals	2
Seattle Seahawks	3	New York Giants	2
Denver Broncos	3	Philadelphia Eagles	2
Buffalo Bills	2	Chicago Bears	1
New England Patriots	2	San Francisco 49ers	1
San Diego Chargers	1	New Orleans Saints	1
Cincinnati Bengals	1	Green Bay Packers	0
Pittsburgh Steelers	0	Atlanta Falcons	0
Cleveland Browns	0		
