= Mitch Berger =

Canadian gridiron football player (born 1972)

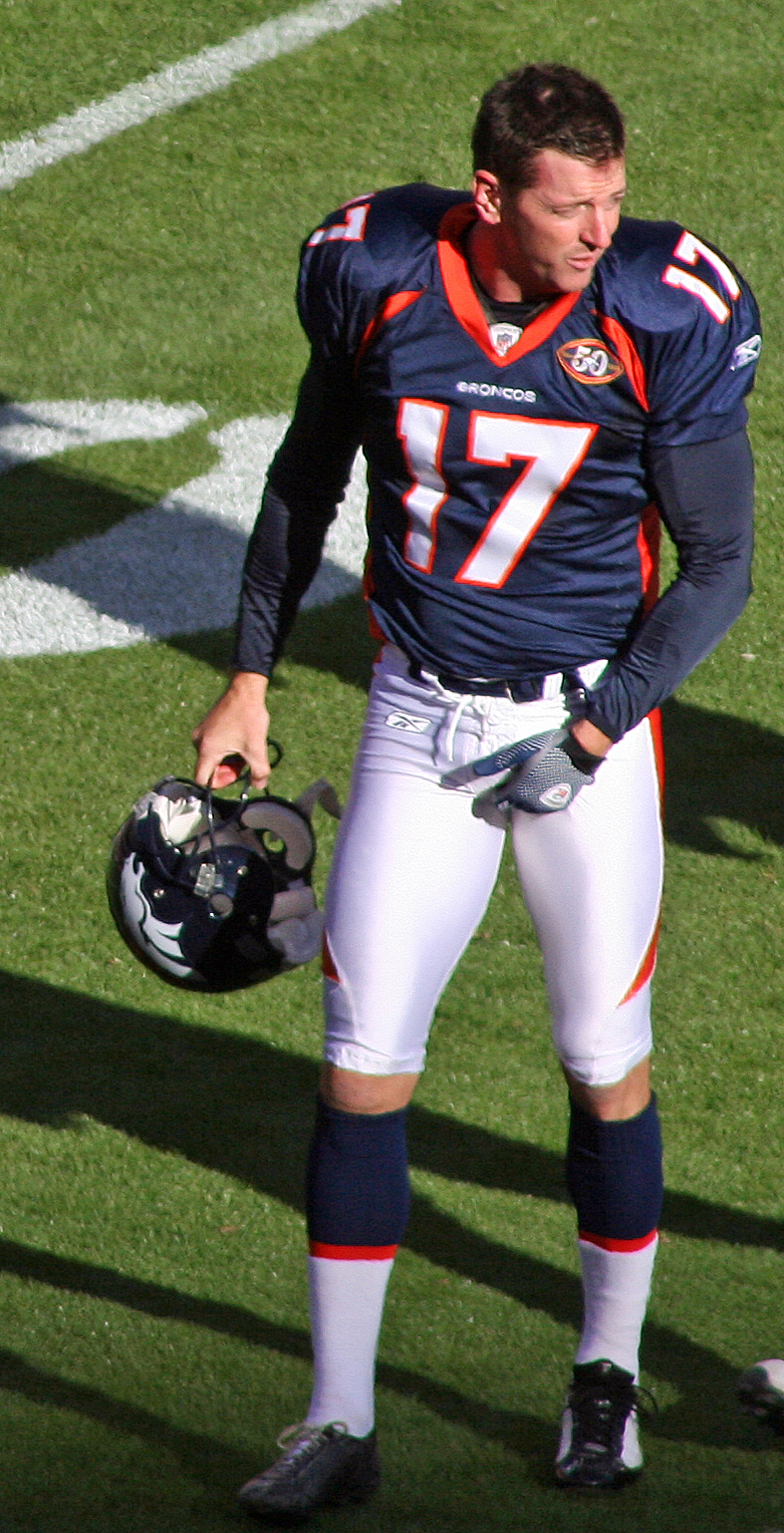
- Berger with the Denver Broncos in 2009

No. 17
- Position: Punter

Personal information
- Born: June 24, 1972 (age 54); Kamloops, British Columbia, Canada
- Listed height: 6 ft 4 in (1.93 m)
- Listed weight: 228 lb (103 kg)

Career information
- High school: North Delta (Delta, British Columbia)
- College: Tyler Junior College (1990); Colorado (1991–1993)
- NFL draft: 1994: 6th round, 193rd overall pick
- CFL draft: 1994: 1st round, 12th overall pick

Career history
- Philadelphia Eagles (1994); Cincinnati Bengals (1994)*; Chicago Bears (1995)*; Indianapolis Colts (1995)*; Green Bay Packers (1995)*; Chicago Bears (1995); Minnesota Vikings (1996–2001); St. Louis Rams (2002); New Orleans Saints (2003–2006); Arizona Cardinals (2007); Pittsburgh Steelers (2008); Denver Broncos (2009)
- * Offseason or practice squad member only

Awards and highlights
- Super Bowl champion (XLIII); First-team All-Pro (2004); Second-team All-Pro (1999); 2× Pro Bowl (1999, 2004); 2× First-team All-American (1992, 1993)

Career NFL statistics
- Punts: 847
- Punt yards: 36,363
- Punting yard average: 42.9
- Stats at Pro Football Reference

Mitchell Shannon Berger (born June 24, 1972) is a Canadian former professional football player who was a punter in the National Football League (NFL). He played college football for the Colorado Buffaloes and was selected by the Philadelphia Eagles in the sixth round of the 1994 NFL draft.

Berger has also been a member of the Cincinnati Bengals, Chicago Bears, Indianapolis Colts, Green Bay Packers, Minnesota Vikings, St. Louis Rams, New Orleans Saints, Arizona Cardinals, Pittsburgh Steelers and Denver Broncos. He won Super Bowl XLIII with the Steelers.

== Early life ==
Berger attended North Delta Senior Secondary School in Delta, British Columbia and was a letterman in football and basketball. In football, as a senior, he won All-Provincial honours as both, a kicker and as a punter, and was also the team's starting quarterback. In basketball, he won All-Provincial honours. Mitch Berger graduated from North Delta Secondary School in 1990.

== College career ==
Berger attended Tyler Junior College in Tyler, Texas and won honorable mention All-American honors as a sophomore. He finished his college career by transferring to the University of Colorado.

== Professional career ==
=== Philadelphia Eagles ===
Berger was selected by the Philadelphia Eagles in the sixth round of the 1994 NFL draft. He was also drafted in the first round of the 1994 CFL draft by the Winnipeg Blue Bombers.

=== Minnesota Vikings ===
Perhaps Berger's best seasons came as a member of the Minnesota Vikings in the late 1990s. He was most noted for his booming kickoffs, which often sailed into the end zone for touchbacks; afterwards, he would take a bite of a Snickers bar that he would keep in his spare shoe on the sideline.

=== Pittsburgh Steelers ===
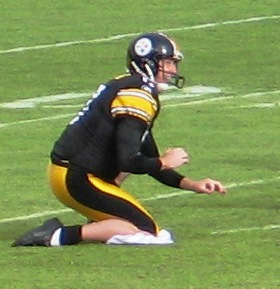
Berger during his tenure with the Steelers

Berger was signed by the Pittsburgh Steelers after an injury to punter Daniel Sepulveda to compete with signing Paul Ernster. Berger won the job as Ernster was released on August 30 during final cuts. After experiencing hamstring problems, Berger was released by the Steelers on November 5 and the team re-signed Ernster. Following three poor performances by Ernster, Berger was re-signed by the Steelers on November 24. Berger developed into a great tackling punter, as evidenced by his five tackles in the 2008 season. He had two key touchdown-saving tackles.

Berger won his first Super Bowl with the Steelers at Super Bowl XLIII in which he had three punts for a 46.3 yard average and one inside the 20 yard-line.

=== Denver Broncos ===
Berger signed with the Denver Broncos on October 26, 2009, after they waived Brett Kern. He was released after the 2009 season.

== NFL career statistics ==
Legend
	Won the Super Bowl
	Led the league
**Bold**	Career high

Year	Team	Punting									
Year	Team	GP	Punts	Yds	Net Yds	Lng	Avg	Net Avg	Blk	Ins20	TB
1994	PHI	5	25	951	783	57	38.0	31.3	0	8	2
1996	MIN	16	**88**	3,616	2,919	63	41.1	32.4	**2**	26	6
1997	MIN	14	73	3,133	2,488	65	42.9	34.1	0	22	5
1998	MIN	16	55	2,458	2,033	67	44.7	37.0	0	17	5
1999	MIN	16	61	2,769	2,343	**75**	**45.4**	38.4	0	18	9
2000	MIN	16	62	2,773	2,243	60	44.7	36.2	0	16	**11**
2001	MIN	12	47	2,046	1,544	67	43.5	32.9	0	10	10
2002	STL	16	72	3,020	2,357	64	41.9	32.7	0	26	10
2003	NOR	16	71	3,144	2,750	59	44.3	38.2	1	**28**	5
2004	NOR	16	85	**3,704**	**3,314**	63	43.6	**39.0**	0	**28**	4
2005	NOR	16	71	3,066	2,746	69	43.2	38.7	0	**28**	3
2007	ARI	5	20	813	661	56	40.7	33.1	0	6	2
2008	PIT	13	66	2,728	2,405	61	41.3	36.4	0	19	4
2009	DEN	10	51	2,142	1,933	65	42.0	37.9	0	13	2
Career		187	847	36,363	30,519	75	42.9	35.9	3	265	78

== Personal life ==
Berger owns a set of nightclubs and restaurants in his hometown of Vancouver, British Columbia.
