= Jake Reed (American football) =

American football player (born 1967)

No. 86
- Position: Wide receiver

Personal information
- Born: September 28, 1967 (age 59); Covington, Georgia, U.S.
- Listed height: 6 ft 3 in (1.91 m)
- Listed weight: 213 lb (97 kg)

Career information
- High school: Newton (Covington, Georgia)
- College: Grambling State (1987–1990)
- NFL draft: 1991: 3rd round, 68th overall pick

Career history
- Minnesota Vikings (1991–1999); New Orleans Saints (2000); Minnesota Vikings (2001); New Orleans Saints (2002)

Career NFL statistics
- Receptions: 450
- Receiving yards: 6,999
- Receiving touchdowns: 36
- Stats at Pro Football Reference

Willie Jake Reed (born September 28, 1967) is an American former professional football player who was a wide receiver for 12 seasons in the National Football League (NFL) from 1991 to 2002 for the Minnesota Vikings and the New Orleans Saints. Reed played college football for the Grambling State Tigers and was selected by the Vikings in the third round of the 1991 NFL draft, a pick that the Vikings acquired in the Herschel Walker trade.

Reed is the father of J. R. Reed, who is a safety for the Montreal Alouettes of the Canadian Football League (CFL) . His brother is former NFL cornerback Dale Carter, with whom he was a teammate on the Vikings in the 2001 NFL season. His nephew, Dale's son, is former NFL safety/cornerback Nigel Warrior.

== Professional career ==
Pre-draft measurables
Height	Weight	Arm length	Hand span	40-yard dash	10-yard split	20-yard split	20-yard shuttle	Vertical jump
6 ft 2 7/8 in (1.90 m)	215 lb (98 kg)	33 in (0.84 m)	10 in (0.25 m)	4.62 s	1.61 s	2.70 s	4.38 s	35.5 in (0.90 m)
All values from NFL Combine

Reed had four 1,000-yard seasons in his career with a career-high of 85 receptions in 1994. He was second in receiving yards in the NFL with 1,320 in the 1996 season. Reed finished his career with 450 receptions for 6,999 yards and 36 touchdowns.

In 1994, Reed combined with fellow receiver Cris Carter for 207 receptions, which was an NFL record at the time. Carter and Reed combined to become the first teammate duo to amass 1,000 yards each in four consecutive seasons. Reed was NFC Offensive Player of the Month in September 1997 after 34 catches for 521 yards. Reed would also make 12 plays of 50+ yards with Minnesota, second in team history.

== NFL career statistics ==
Legend
**Bold**	Career high

=== Regular season ===
Year	Team	Games		Receiving				
Year	Team	GP	GS	Rec	Yds	Avg	Lng	TD
1991	MIN	1	0	0	0	0.0	0	0
1992	MIN	**16**	0	6	142	**23.7**	51	0
1993	MIN	10	1	5	65	13.0	18	0
1994	MIN	**16**	**16**	**85**	1,175	13.8	59	4
1995	MIN	**16**	**16**	72	1,167	16.2	55	**9**
1996	MIN	**16**	15	72	**1,320**	18.3	**82**	7
1997	MIN	**16**	**16**	68	1,138	16.7	56	6
1998	MIN	11	11	34	474	13.9	56	4
1999	MIN	**16**	8	44	643	14.6	50	2
2000	NOR	7	6	16	206	12.9	22	0
2001	MIN	**16**	0	27	309	11.4	27	1
2002	NOR	14	2	21	360	17.1	54	3
		155	91	450	6,999	15.6	82	36

=== Playoffs ===
Year	Team	Games		Receiving				
Year	Team	GP	GS	Rec	Yds	Avg	Lng	TD
1992	MIN	1	0	0	0	0.0	0	0
1993	MIN	1	0	2	16	8.0	12	0
1994	MIN	1	0	3	39	13.0	18	0
1996	MIN	1	0	1	10	10.0	10	0
1997	MIN	**2**	**2**	**10**	**203**	**20.3**	**53**	**1**
1998	MIN	1	0	0	0	0.0	0	0
1999	MIN	**2**	1	5	85	17.0	41	**1**
2000	NOR	**2**	1	5	56	11.2	16	0
		11	4	26	409	15.7	53	2
