= Chris Rogers (American football) =

American football player (born 1977)

No. 29
- Position: Defensive back

Personal information
- Born: January 3, 1977 (age 49); Washington, D. C., U.S.
- Listed height: 5 ft 10 in (1.78 m)
- Listed weight: 192 lb (87 kg)

Career information
- High school: Largo (MD)
- College: Howard
- NFL draft: 1999: undrafted

Career history
- Minnesota Vikings (1999)
- Stats at Pro Football Reference

Chris Rogers (born January 3, 1977) is an American former professional football player who was a defensive back for the Minnesota Vikings of the National Football League (NFL). He played college football for the Howard Bison.
