= 1999 Dallas Cowboys season =

NFL team season

- Owner: Jerry Jones
- General manager: Jerry Jones
- Head coach: Chan Gailey
- Defensive coordinator: Dave Campo
- Home stadium: Texas Stadium

Results
- Record: 8–8
- Division place: 2nd NFC East
- Playoffs: Lost Wild Card Playoffs (at Vikings) 10–27
- Pro Bowlers: RB Emmitt Smith; CB Deion Sanders; LB Dexter Coakley; OL Larry Allen; OT Erik Williams

Uniform
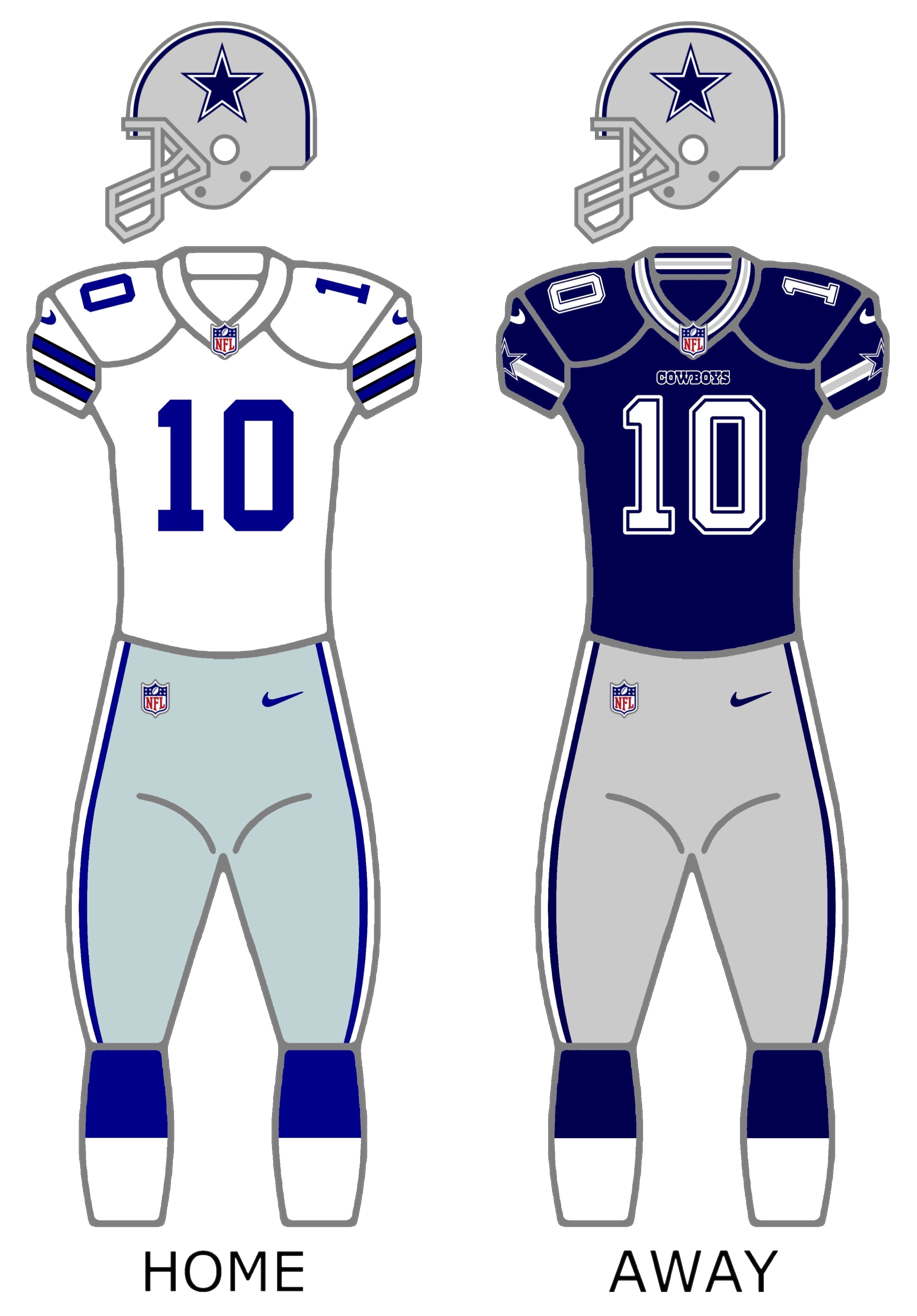

The 1999 season was the Dallas Cowboys' 40th in the National Football League (NFL) and second and final under head coach Chan Gailey. The Cowboys were looking to return to the playoffs, improve on their 10–6 record from the previous season and head to the Super Bowl for the final time in the 1990s.

While the Cowboys were unable to repeat as division champions or match their win total from 1998, their 8–8 record enabled them to qualify for the playoffs as a wild-card team. The Cowboys lost to the Minnesota Vikings 27–10, ending their season in the opening round of the playoffs for a second consecutive year.

Gailey was fired at the end of the season. The Cowboys would not return to the playoffs until 2003.

== Offseason ==
=== 1999 expansion draft ===
Cowboys selected during the expansion draft
Pick	Name	Position	Expansion team
2	Hurvin McCormack	Defensive end	Cleveland Browns
26	Antonio Anderson	Defensive tackle	Cleveland Browns

=== NFL draft ===
1999 Dallas Cowboys draft
Round	Pick	Player	Position	College	Notes
1	20	Ebenezer Ekuban	Defensive end	North Carolina	
2	55	Solomon Page	Tackle	West Virginia	
3	85	Dat Nguyen	Linebacker	Texas A&M	
4	118	Wane McGarity	Wide receiver	Texas	
4	132	Peppi Zellner	Defensive end	Fort Valley State	
6	193	MarTay Jenkins	Wide receiver	Nebraska–Omaha	
7	229	Mike Lucky	Tight end	Arizona	
7	243	Kelvin Garmon	Guard	Baylor	
Made roster * Made at least one Pro Bowl during career

=== Undrafted free agents ===
1999 undrafted free agents of note
Player	Position	College
Kevin Brooks	Cornerback	South Carolina
Duane Hawthorne	Cornerback	Northern Illinois
Brian Kuklick	Quarterback	Wake Forest
Gabe Lindstrom	Punter	Toledo
Denvis Manns	Running back	New Mexico State
LaDouphyous McCalla	Cornerback	Rice
Ryan Neufeld	Fullback	UCLA
Robert Newkirk	Defensive tackle	Michigan State
Grant Pearsall	Safety	USC
Joe Phipps	Linebacker	TCU
Billy Powell	Wide receiver	Rutgers

== Hall of Fame game ==
- Cleveland Browns 20, Dallas Cowboys 17 (overtime)

== Regular season ==
The season began at Washington with a come-from-behind victory over the division-rival Washington Redskins. Trailing by three touchdowns entering the fourth quarter, they rallied to tie the game. Then free agent acquisition Raghib Ismail hauled in the winning touchdown catch in overtime while Troy Aikman threw for a franchise-record five touchdowns in a single game (since matched by Tony Romo).

The team started with a 3–0 record, but a week 5 injury to wide receiver Michael Irvin against the Philadelphia Eagles eventually forced him into retirement. Afterwards, Dallas struggled down the stretch as age and injury began to take their toll. The team again made the playoffs despite an 8–8 season, but lost once more in the first round to the Minnesota Vikings. Despite leading the team to consecutive playoff berths and seemingly re-igniting the Dallas offense, head coach Chan Gailey was fired by owner Jerry Jones after the season.

A notable addition to the team was fan favorite linebacker Dat Nguyen, the only (to date) Vietnamese-American to play in the NFL. Another notable addition was Tim Lester, reuniting him with Ernie Mills, whom he had played with from 1995 to 1996 while they were on the Pittsburgh Steelers, losing Super Bowl XXX to the Cowboys.

This marked the final season for future Hall of Famer Michael Irvin and longtime Cowboys fullback Daryl Johnston. Irvin and Johnston both suffered season-ending (and as it turned out career-ending) injuries early in the season. Irvin was the last Cowboys player to have played for Tom Landry.

The annual Thanksgiving Day game featured the return of former Cowboys head coach Jimmy Johnson to Texas Stadium as Miami Dolphins head coach. It was the only game Johnson ever coached in Texas Stadium as a visiting coach. The Cowboys won 20–0.

The Cowboys lost four games in which their defense only yielded 13 points in each contest.

=== Schedule ===
Week	Date	Opponent	Result	Record	Venue	Attendance
1	September 12	at **Washington Redskins**	**W** 41–35 (OT)	1–0	Jack Kent Cooke Stadium	79,237
2	September 20	Atlanta Falcons	**W** 24–7	2–0	Texas Stadium	63,663
3	Bye					
4	October 3	**Arizona Cardinals**	**W** 35–7	3–0	Texas Stadium	64,169
5	October 10	at **Philadelphia Eagles**	**L** 10–13	3–1	Veterans Stadium	66,669
6	October 18	at **New York Giants**	**L** 10–13	3–2	Giants Stadium	78,204
7	October 24	**Washington Redskins**	**W** 38–20	4–2	Texas Stadium	64,377
8	October 31	at Indianapolis Colts	**L** 24–34	4–3	RCA Dome	56,860
9	November 8	at Minnesota Vikings	**L** 17–27	4–4	Hubert H. Humphrey Metrodome	64,111
10	November 14	Green Bay Packers	**W** 27–13	5–4	Texas Stadium	64,634
11	November 21	at **Arizona Cardinals**	**L** 9–13	5–5	Sun Devil Stadium	72,015
12	November 25	Miami Dolphins	**W** 20–0	6–5	Texas Stadium	64,328
13	December 5	at New England Patriots	**L** 6–13	6–6	Foxboro Stadium	58,444
14	December 12	**Philadelphia Eagles**	**W** 20–10	7–6	Texas Stadium	64,086
15	December 19	New York Jets	**L** 21–22	7–7	Texas Stadium	64,271
16	December 24	at New Orleans Saints	**L** 24–31	7–8	Louisiana Superdome	47,835
17	January 2, 2000	**New York Giants**	**W** 26–18	8–8	Texas Stadium	63,767

Note: Intra-division opponents are in bold text.

=== Standings ===
NFC East
	W	L	T	PCT	PF	PA	STK
^{(3)} Washington Redskins	10	6	0	.625	443	377	W2
^{(5)} Dallas Cowboys	8	8	0	.500	352	276	W1
New York Giants	7	9	0	.438	299	358	L3
Arizona Cardinals	6	10	0	.375	245	382	L4
Philadelphia Eagles	5	11	0	.313	272	357	W2

== Playoffs ==
Round	Date	Opponent (seed)	Result	Record	Venue
Wild Card	January 9, 2000	at Minnesota Vikings (4)	L 27–10	0–1	Hubert H. Humphrey Metrodome

== Roster ==
1999 Dallas Cowboys roster
Quarterbacks (QB): 8 Troy Aikman; 17 Jason Garrett; 11 Mike Quinn; Running backs (RB): 35 Robert Chancey FB; 39 Ryan Neufeld FB; 22 Emmitt Smith; 44 Robert Thomas FB; 42 Chris Warren; Wide receivers (WR): 82 Chris Brazzell; 81 Rocket Ismail; 80 Ernie Mills; 85 Jeff Ogden KR; 87 Jason Tucker KR; Tight ends (TE): 86 Eric Bjornson; 89 David LaFleur; 84 Mike Lucky	Offensive linemen (OL): 76 Flozell Adams T; 73 Larry Allen G; 69 Ben Fricke C; 67 Everett McIver G; 62 Tom Myslinski C/G; 77 Solomon Page G/T; 53 Mark Stepnoski C; 79 Erik Williams T; Defensive linemen (DL): 96 Ebenezer Ekuban DE; 95 Chad Hennings DT; 78 Leon Lett DE/DT; 94 Michael Myers DT; 75 Brandon Noble DT; 97 Kavika Pittman DE; 90 Alonzo Spellman DT; 93 Peppi Zellner DE	Linebackers (LB): 52 Dexter Coakley OLB; 57 Quentin Coryatt OLB; 56 Randall Godfrey MLB; 55 Lemanski Hall OLB; 54 Darren Hambrick OLB; 59 Dat Nguyen MLB; Defensive backs (DB): 24 Vashone Adams SS; 29 Chris Akins FS; 41 Wendell Davis CB; 38 Duane Hawthorne CB; 34 Jason Kaiser FS; 23 Kevin Mathis CB/KR; 27 Singor Mobley SS; 21 Deion Sanders CB/PR; 26 Kevin Smith CB; 31 George Teague FS; 25 Charlie Williams CB; 28 Darren Woodson SS; Special teams (ST): 4 Toby Gowin P; 70 Dale Hellestrae LS; 3 Eddie Murray K	Practice squad: 60 Chris Brymer T; 92 Kendrick Gholston DE; 19 Deon Mitchell WR; 51 Joe Phipps LB; 74 Greg Wilkins DT; Reserve: -- Hayward Clay TE (IR); 98 Greg Ellis DE (IR); 61 Kelvin Garmon G (NF-Inj.); 66 Tony Hutson G (IR); 88 Michael Irvin WR (IR); 48 Daryl Johnston FB (IR); 63 Mike Kiselak C (IR); 83 Wane McGarity (IR); -- James McKnight WR (IR); 32 Beau Morgan RB (IR); 43 Izell Reese S (IR); 36 Tarik Smith RB (IR); 50 Brandon Tolbert LB (IR); 30 Kenny Wheaton CB/S (IR); Rookies in italics 53 active, 14 reserve, 5 practice squad

== Publications ==
The Football Encyclopedia ISBN 0-312-11435-4
Total Football ISBN 0-06-270170-3
Cowboys Have Always Been My Heroes ISBN 0-446-51950-2
