= Jeff Paulk =

American football player (born 1976)

No. 40, 46
- Position: Fullback

Personal information
- Born: April 26, 1976 (age 50); Phoenix, Arizona, U.S.
- Listed height: 6 ft 0 in (1.83 m)
- Listed weight: 240 lb (109 kg)

Career information
- High school: Corona del Sol (Tempe, Arizona)
- College: Arizona State
- NFL draft: 1999: 3rd round, 92nd overall pick

Career history
- Atlanta Falcons (1999); New England Patriots (2000); Jacksonville Jaguars (2001)*
- * Offseason or practice squad member only

Career NFL statistics
- Games played: 2
- Stats at Pro Football Reference

Jeffrey Howard Paulk (born April 26, 1976) is an American former professional football player who was a fullback in the National Football League (NFL). He was selected by the Atlanta Falcons in the third round of the 1999 NFL draft. In addition, he played for the New England Patriots. He played college football for the Arizona State Sun Devils.
