= John Burrough (American football) =

American football player (born 1972)

No. 91, 95
- Position: Defensive lineman

Personal information
- Born: May 17, 1972 (age 54); Laramie, Wyoming, U.S.
- Listed height: 6 ft 5 in (1.96 m)
- Listed weight: 275 lb (125 kg)

Career information
- High school: Pinedale (Pinedale, Wyoming)
- College: Washington State; Wyoming
- NFL draft: 1995: 7th round, 245th overall pick

Career history
- Atlanta Falcons (1995–1998); Minnesota Vikings (1999–2000); St. Louis Rams (2002)

Career NFL statistics
- Games played: 89
- Games started: 13
- Tackles: 62
- Sacks: 4.5
- Fumble recoveries: 1
- Stats at Pro Football Reference

John Leslie Burrough (born May 17, 1972) is an American former professional football player who was a defensive lineman in the National Football League (NFL). After playing college football for the Washington State Cougars and Wyoming Cowboys, Burrough was selected by the Atlanta Falcons in the seventh round (245th overall) of the 1995 NFL draft. He played seven seasons for the Falcons (1995–1998), Minnesota Vikings (1999–2000), and St. Louis Rams (2002).
