= Jeff Diamond =

American football executive

Jeff Diamond is a retired NFL executive. He worked for the Minnesota Vikings from 1976 to 1998, during which time he rose from a minor post in public relations to the position of Senior Vice President and General Manager.

In 1999, after being named NFL Executive of the Year, he was hired away by the Tennessee Titans to be President of that organization, and remained in that post until his retirement in 2004.

During his time as an NFL executive, Diamond's teams went to the Super Bowl once (the Titans after the 1999 season). While Senior Vice President for the Vikings, they achieved a franchise high of 15 wins during the 1998 regular season.
