= Rob Brzezinski =

American football executive

Minnesota Vikings
- Title: Executive vice president of football operations

Career information
- High school: Cathedral Preparatory School (Erie, Pennsylvania)
- College: Nova Southeastern

Career history
- Miami Dolphins (1993–1998) Staff counsel & salary cap manager; Minnesota Vikings (1999–present); Director of football administration (1999–2000); Vice president of football administration (2001–2013); Executive vice president of football operations (2014–present)
- Executive profile at Pro Football Reference

Rob Brzezinski is an American professional football executive who is the executive vice president of football operations for the Minnesota Vikings of the National Football League (NFL). Brzezinski has previously held various roles with the Vikings since 1999.

== Early life and education ==
Brzezinski graduated from Cathedral Prep in Erie, PA in 1988. Brzezinski earned degrees from Nova Southeastern University in Fort Lauderdale, a Juris Doctor in 1995 and a Bachelor of Science in education in 1992. In addition, Brzezinski is a member of the Florida Bar.

== Executive career ==
=== Miami Dolphins ===
In 1993, Brzezinski was hired by the Miami Dolphins as a staff counsel and salary cap manager. He would go on to serve in this role for six seasons (1993–1998).

=== Minnesota Vikings ===
In 1999, Brzezinski was hired by the Minnesota Vikings as their director of football administration. In 2001, he was promoted to vice president of football administration. In 2014, Brzezinski was promoted to executive vice president of football operations. On January 30, 2026, the Vikings owner, Mark Wilf, announced the firing of general manager, Kwesi Adofo-Mensah, and that Brzezinski would assume the duties of general manager through the 2026 NFL draft.

== Personal life ==
Brzezinski is married to Leah, who has earned a doctoral degree in education. They have 5 children, including Ki, whom in 2003, the Brzezinskis chose to adopt from Korea. The Brzezinski family founded Arete Academy in 2014, which is described as being dedicated to educating students who are twice exceptional and are active in the community raising awareness for adoption-related causes.

Brzezinski is known by staff as "Rob Zombie" due to his stoic demeanor.
