= 1999 Philadelphia Eagles season =

National Football League team season

- Owner: Jeffrey Lurie
- Head coach: Andy Reid
- Offensive coordinator: Rod Dowhower
- Defensive coordinator: Jim Johnson
- Home stadium: Veterans Stadium

Results
- Record: 5–11
- Division place: 5th NFC East
- Playoffs: Did not qualify

The 1999 Philadelphia Eagles season was the franchise's 67th season in the National Football League (NFL), and the first under head coach Andy Reid. The team finished 5–11 and last place in the NFC East. The Eagles hired Reid away from the Green Bay Packers to be their new head coach prior to the start of the season. In the 1999 NFL draft, the team drafted quarterback Donovan McNabb with the second overall pick. Prior to McNabb taking over the starting role, the Eagles were quarterbacked by future head coach Doug Pederson, who led the Eagles to the win in Super Bowl LII. This would be the last year they missed the playoffs until 2005.

== Offseason ==
=== NFL draft ===
The 1999 NFL draft was held April 17–18, 1999. The league also held a supplemental draft after the regular draft and before the regular season.

The Eagles, with the same record of 3–13 in 1998 as the Cincinnati Bengals and the Indianapolis Colts, would normally have had a chance at the number 1 pick in the 1999 draft. But the new Cleveland Browns franchise were given the top pick by the NFL. The Eagles did win the 2nd pick in the Draft and selected University of Syracuse quarterback Donovan McNabb. The Eagles, Bengals, and Colts rotated in each round picking 2nd, 3rd, or 4th after the Browns.

The table shows the Eagles selections and what picks they had that were traded away and the team that ended up with that pick. It is possible the Eagles' pick ended up with this team via another team that the Eagles made a trade with. Not shown are acquired picks that the Eagles traded away.

= Pro Bowler	= Hall of Famer

Rd	Pick #	Player	Position	College
1	2	Donovan McNabb	Quarterback	Syracuse
2	35	Barry Gardner	Linebacker	Northwestern
3	64	Doug Brzezinski	Guard	Boston College
4	97	John Welbourn	Guard	California
4	128	Damon Moore _{Free Agent Compensation Pick}	Safety	Ohio State
4	130	Na Brown _{Free Agent Compensation Pick}	Wide receiver	North Carolina
5	137	_{Pick Traded to Detroit Lions}		
6	172	Cecil Martin	Fullback	Wisconsin
6	201	Troy Smith _{Pick Acquired from Denver Broncos}	Wide receiver	East Carolina
7	208	Jed Weaver	Tight end	Oregon
7	251	Pernell Davis _{Free Agent Compensation Pick}	Defensive tackle	Alabama-Birmingham

- A Compensation Pick is a pick awarded by the NFL to a team that loses a Free Agent the year before

== Staff ==
The Philadelphia Eagles staff in 1999 included numerous future head coaches with numerous attaining success. The staff that would become head coaches included:

- John Harbaugh: Baltimore Ravens (2008–2025), New York Giants (2026–present)
- Sean McDermott: Buffalo Bills (2017–2025)
- Ron Rivera: Carolina Panthers (2010–2019), Washington Commanders (2020–2023)
- Steve Spagnuolo: St. Louis Rams (2009–2011)
- Brad Childress: Minnesota Vikings (2006–2010)
- Leslie Frazier: Minnesota Vikings (2010–2013)
- David Culley: Houston Texans (2021)
- Pat Shurmur: Cleveland Browns (2011–2012), New York Giants (2019–2020)

1999 Philadelphia Eagles staff
Front office: Owner/Chief Executive Officer – Jeffrey Lurie; Executive vice president – Joe Banner; Director of football operations – Tom Modrak; Director of college scouting – John Goeller; Director of pro personnel – Mike McCartney; Head coaches: Head coach – Andy Reid; Assistant to the head coach – Sean McDermott; Offensive coaches: Offensive coordinator – Rod Dowhower; Quarterbacks – Brad Childress; Running backs – Ted Williams; Wide receivers – David Culley; Tight ends/offensive line – Pat Shurmur; Offensive line – Juan Castillo; Offensive assistant/quality control – Tom Melvin	Defensive coaches: Defensive coordinator – Jim Johnson; Defensive line – Tommy Brasher; Linebackers – Ron Rivera; Defensive backs – Leslie Frazier; Defensive assistant – Steve Spagnuolo; Special teams coaches: Special teams – John Harbaugh; Strength and conditioning: Head athletic trainer – Rick Burkholder; Strength and conditioning – Mike Wolf; Assistant strength and conditioning – Tom Kanavy

== Roster ==
Philadelphia Eagles 1999 final roster
Quarterbacks: 10 Koy Detmer; 5 Donovan McNabb; 14 Doug Pederson; Running backs: 33 Eric Bieniemy KR; 38 Cecil Martin FB; 22 Duce Staley; 35 Edwin Watson; Wide receivers: 85 Na Brown; 82 Dameane Douglas; 83 Dietrich Jells; 80 Torrance Small; 19 Troy Smith; 86 Alex Van Dyke; Tight ends: 88 Luther Broughton; 89 Chad Lewis; 87 Jed Weaver	Offensive linemen: 74 Doug Brzezinski G; 66 Jeff Dellenbach G; 61 Steve Everitt C; 71 Jermane Mayberry G/T; 65 Bubba Miller C/G; 77 Lonnie Palelei T; 73 Oliver Ross G/T; 67 Ryan Schau G; 72 Tra Thomas T; Defensive linemen: 93 Pernell Davis DT; 94 Kelly Gregg DT; 79 Greg Jefferson DE; 59 Mike Mamula DE; 91 Steve Martin DT; 78 Hollis Thomas DT; 97 Mark Wheeler DT; 98 Brandon Whiting DE/DT; 95 Tyrone Williams DE	Linebackers: 56 Mike Caldwell OLB; 57 James Darling OLB; 52 Barry Gardner OLB; 58 Ike Reese OLB; 51 William Thomas OLB; 54 Jeremiah Trotter MLB; Defensive backs: 32 Jason Bostic CB; 42 Rashard Cook FS; 20 Brian Dawkins FS; 31 Al Harris CB; 45 Tim Hauck SS; 43 Damon Moore SS; 25 Allen Rossum CB; 23 Troy Vincent CB; Special teams: 2 David Akers K; 63 David Diaz-Infante LS; 9 Norm Johnson K; 7 Sean Landeta P	Reserve lists: 84 Jamie Asher TE (IR); 53 Hugh Douglas DE (IR); 81 Charles Johnson WR (IR); -- Kaseem Sinceno TE (IR); 21 Bobby Taylor CB (IR); 34 Kevin Turner FB (IR); 96 Al Wallace DE (IR); 76 John Welbourn T (IR); Practice squad: 64 Robert Barr T; 50 Lemar Marshall LB; 41 Jamie Reader FB; 13 Kevin Swayne WR; 52 active, 8 inactive, 4 practice squad

== Regular season ==
The quality of Andy Reid's work with the Packers attracted considerable notice throughout the league, leading to his being hired as the head coach of the Eagles on January 11, 1999. At the time, many in the local media in Philadelphia criticized the hiring, citing the availability of other candidates who had past records of success as head coaches. The Eagles, under former coach Ray Rhodes, finished in a three-way tie for the NFL's worst record at 3–13 the season before he took over. They improved two games in 1999 to finish at 5–11 (including the team's first road victory in 19 games, a 20–16 win over the Bears at Chicago on October 17, which was the first time the Philadelphia franchise had won an away game over the Bears since 1933).

Donovan McNabb was drafted second overall by the Eagles in the 1999 NFL draft. McNabb saw his first NFL regular season action in the second half against the Tampa Bay Buccaneers in a 19–5 home loss on September 19. He made his first career start at home against Washington on November 14, completing eight of 21 passes for 60 yards in a 35–28 win. He also had nine carries for 49 rushing yards and led the team to a pair of successful two-point conversions (1 rush and 1 pass). With the win, he became the first Eagles rookie quarterback to win his first NFL start since Mike Boryla (December 1, 1974, vs. Green Bay) and the first Eagle quarterback to win his first start since Ty Detmer (October 13, 1996, at NYG).

McNabb threw the first TD pass of his career (6 yards to tight end Chad Lewis) vs. Indianapolis in a 44–17 home loss on November 21. McNabb went on to start six of the Eagles' final seven contests (missing the December 19 home game against New England, a 24–9 victory, due to injury) as he became the first Philadelphia Eagles rookie to start in the quarterback position since Brad Goebel on October 13, 1991, and the first Eagles rookie draft pick to start since John Reaves in 1972.

=== Schedule ===
Week	Date	Opponent	Result	Record	Venue	Recap
1	September 12	**Arizona Cardinals**	**L** 24–25	0–1	Veterans Stadium	Recap
2	September 19	Tampa Bay Buccaneers	**L** 5–19	0–2	Veterans Stadium	Recap
3	September 26	at Buffalo Bills	**L** 0–26	0–3	Ralph Wilson Stadium	Recap
4	October 3	at **New York Giants**	**L** 15–16	0–4	Giants Stadium	Recap
5	October 10	**Dallas Cowboys**	**W** 13–10	1–4	Veterans Stadium	Recap
6	October 17	at Chicago Bears	**W** 20–16	2–4	Soldier Field	Recap
7	October 24	at Miami Dolphins	**L** 13–16	2–5	Pro Player Stadium	Recap
8	October 31	**New York Giants**	**L** 17–23 (OT)	2–6	Veterans Stadium	Recap
9	November 7	at Carolina Panthers	**L** 7–33	2–7	Ericsson Stadium	Recap
10	November 14	**Washington Redskins**	**W** 35–28	3–7	Veterans Stadium	Recap
11	November 21	Indianapolis Colts	**L** 17–44	3–8	Veterans Stadium	Recap
12	November 28	at **Washington Redskins**	**L** 17–20 (OT)	3–9	FedExField	Recap
13	December 5	at **Arizona Cardinals**	**L** 17–21	3–10	Sun Devil Stadium	Recap
14	December 12	at **Dallas Cowboys**	**L** 10–20	3–11	Texas Stadium	Recap
15	December 19	New England Patriots	**W** 24–9	4–11	Veterans Stadium	Recap
16	Bye					
17	January 2	St. Louis Rams	**W** 38–31	5–11	Veterans Stadium	Recap

Note: Intra-division opponents are in bold text.

=== Standings ===
NFC East
	W	L	T	PCT	PF	PA	STK
^{(3)} Washington Redskins	10	6	0	.625	443	377	W2
^{(5)} Dallas Cowboys	8	8	0	.500	352	276	W1
New York Giants	7	9	0	.438	299	358	L3
Arizona Cardinals	6	10	0	.375	245	382	L4
Philadelphia Eagles	5	11	0	.313	272	357	W2

=== Game summaries ===
==== Week 1: vs. Arizona Cardinals ====
Cardinals 25, Eagles 24 (0–1)

In the season opener, the Eagles blew a 24–6 halftime lead, suffering a heartbreaking 25–24 home loss that saw the Cardinals rally for 13 fourth quarter points. Chris Jackie kicked the game-winning 31-yard field goal as time expired. Eagles quarterback Doug Pederson went 12 for 26 and a meager 91 yards, throwing for 2 TDs and 2 INTs. Duce Staley rushed for 111 yards on 21 attempts, with 1 rushing and 1 receiving TD. Staley's 24 yard rushing TD in the 1st quarter was the Eagles first score of the year. On defense, Brian Dawkins, Al Harris, and James Darling each intercepted Cardinals' quarterback Jake Plummer. The Eagles led 21–0 in the first quarter before suffering the devastating loss.

==== Week 2: vs. Tampa Bay Buccaneers ====
Buccaneers 19, Eagles 5 (0–2)

The second week of the season saw an ineffective Doug Pederson (12 for 19, 100 yards, one interception) benched at halftime, with rookie Donovan McNabb (4 for 11, 26 yards) making his NFL debut and not faring much better. The Buccaneers defense held the Eagles at bay, with a 13–5 lead at halftime and shutout in the second half. Tampa's attack was led by Warrick Dunn & Mike Alstott, who combined for 146 rushing yards. Alstott and Bert Emanuel caught TD passes from Trent Dilfer (7 for 14, 89 yds, 2 TD, 2 INT). McNabb's first NFL completion was for 7 yards to Kevin Turner for a first down. Troy Vincent and Brian Dawkins intercepted Dilfer. An ugly game with little offense from the Eagles and 9 sacks from the Buccaneers defense.

==== Week 3: at Buffalo Bills ====
Bills 26, Eagles 0 (0–3)

The Eagles threw up another "dud" performance against the Bills, and at the end of the game had the distinction of scoring 3 offensive points over the past 10 quarter. Doug Pederson threw for another pedestrian 14-for-26 and 137 yards. Philly RBs accounted for a meager 22 total yards, while Buffalo ran for over 170 on the ground. Donovan McNabb replaced Pederson in the 4th quarter, down 26–0, and would go 6-for-11 for 34 yards. McNabb's 10 yards rushing led all Eagles rushers. Brian Dawkins intercepted a pass for the third straight game.

==== Week 5: vs. Dallas Cowboys ====
Dallas Cowboys at Philadelphia Eagles

Quarter	1	2	3	4	Total
Cowboys	3	7	0	0	**10**
Eagles	0	0	0	13	**13**

at Veterans Stadium • Philadelphia, Pennsylvania

- Date: October 10
- Game time: 1:00 p.m.
- Game weather: 64 °F (18 °C) • wind 11 mph (18 km/h)
- TV announcers (FOX): Pat Summerall, John Madden, and DJ Johnson
- Pro-Football-Reference.com

Game information

Cowboys

- Troy Aikman
  21/39, 177 Yds, TD, 2 INT
- Emmitt Smith
  30 Rush, 114 Yds
- Raghib Ismail
  7 Rec, 88 Yds

Eagles

- Doug Pederson
  11/29, 145 Yds, TD, INT
- Duce Staley
  22 Rush, 110 Yds
- Charles Johnson
  2 Rec, 64 Yds, TD

Scoring summary

Quarter	Time	Drive			Team	Scoring information	Score	
Quarter	Time	Plays	Yards	TOP	Team	Scoring information	DAL	PHI
1					Cowboys	42-yard field goal by Cunningham	3	0
2					Cowboys	Smith 9-yard touchdown reception from Aikman, Cunningham kick good	10	0
4					Eagles	38-yard field goal by N. Johnson	10	3
4					Eagles	31-yard field goal by N. Johnson	10	6
4					Eagles	C. Johnson 28-yard touchdown reception from Pederson, N. Johnson kick good	10	13
"TOP" = time of possession. For other American football terms, see Glossary of American football.							10	13
