= 1999 NFL season =

American football season

Regular season
- Duration: September 12, 1999 – January 3, 2000

Playoffs
- Start date: January 8, 2000
- AFC Champions: Tennessee Titans
- NFC Champions: St. Louis Rams

Super Bowl XXXIV
- Date: January 30, 2000
- Site: Georgia Dome, Atlanta, Georgia
- Champions: St. Louis Rams

Pro Bowl
- Date: February 6, 2000
- Site: Aloha Stadium

AFC teams: West, Central, East
NFC teams: West, Central, East

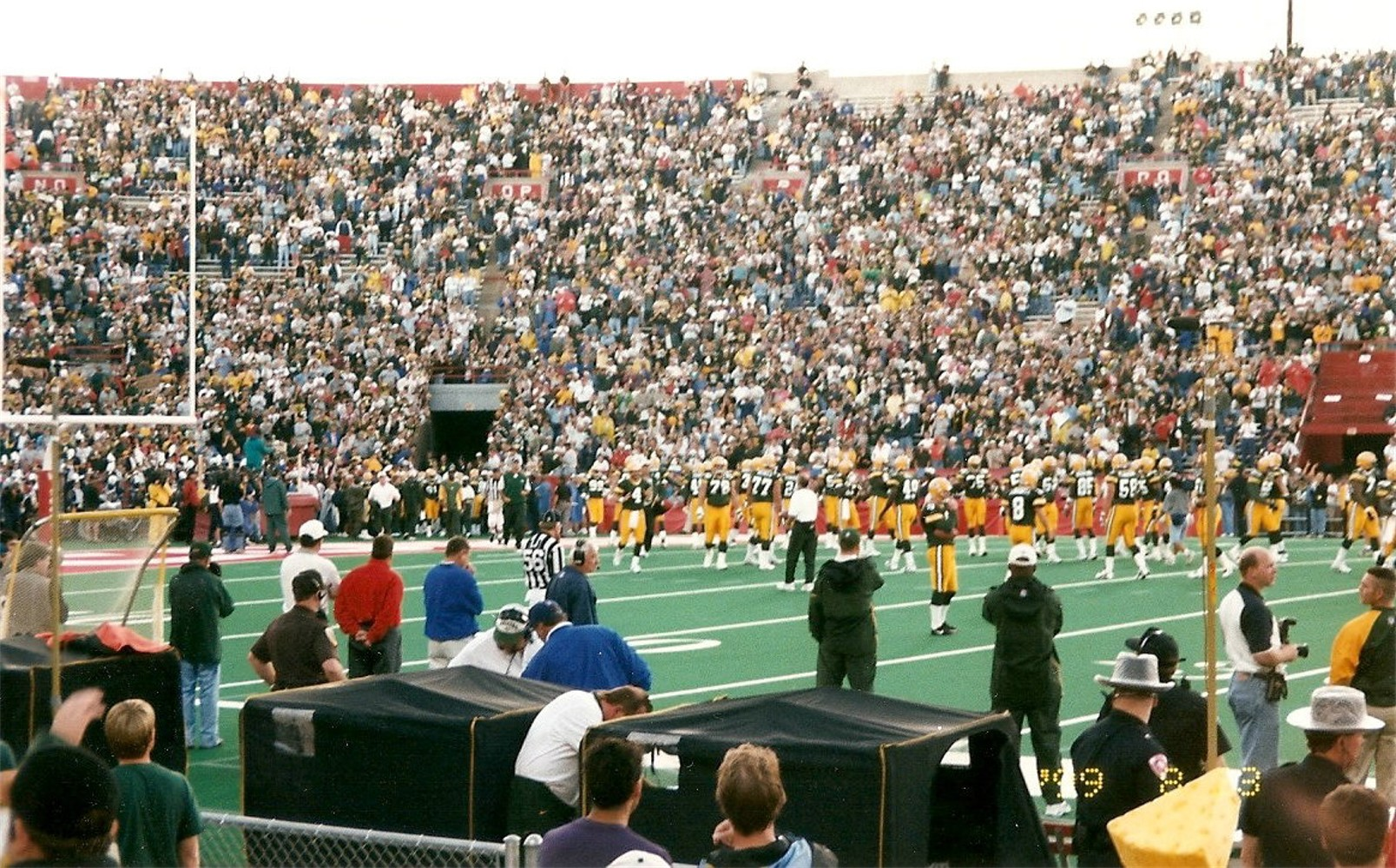
Photo of the Green Bay vs. Denver preseason game at Camp Randall Stadium on August 23, 1999

The 1999 NFL season was the 80th regular season of the National Football League (NFL). The Cleveland Browns returned to the field for the first time since the 1995 season, while the Tennessee Oilers changed their name to "Tennessee Titans", with the league retiring the name "Oilers".

The return of the Browns increased the number of teams to 31, the first time the league had played with an odd number of teams since 1966. As per the league's agreement with the City of Cleveland, the Browns were placed in the AFC Central, increasing that division to six teams. This also required the NFL to give at least one team a bye each week; previously, barring extreme circumstances, a club never received a bye during the first two weeks or last seven weeks of the season. Under the new system, for ten weeks of the season (Week #1, Week #2 and Week #10 to Week #17), one team received a bye, and for seven weeks of the season (Week #3 to Week #9), three teams received a bye. This format would continue until the Houston Texans joined the NFL in 2002, returning the league to an even number of teams.

The start of the 1999 NFL season was pushed back one week and started the weekend after Labor Day, a change from the previous seasons: due to the Y2K concerns, the NFL did not want to hold the opening round of the playoffs on Saturday, January 1, 2000, and did not want teams traveling on that day. This was also done to avoid competing against college football's New Years Day bowl games.

Week 17 games were held on January 2, 2000, and the opening round of the playoffs would be scheduled for January 8 and 9, with the bye week before the Super Bowl removed to accommodate the one-week adjustment. The start of the season after Labor Day would become a regular fixture for future seasons, beginning in 2001.

The final spot in the NFC playoffs came down to the final day of the regular season. The Green Bay Packers and Carolina Panthers were both at 7–8, tied for the last spot in the playoffs with the Dallas Cowboys and tied in other tiebreakers. The Packers–Panthers tie would be broken by best net point differential in conference games. With both the Packers and Panthers playing at 1:00 p.m. Eastern on January 2, the two teams tried to outscore the other. The Packers beat the Arizona Cardinals 49–24, and the Panthers beat the New Orleans Saints 45–13, with the result that the Packers finished ahead of the Panthers by 11 points. Nevertheless, Dallas defeated the New York Giants later that night to claim the final playoff spot.

The St. Louis Rams, who had a losing record for each of the previous nine seasons dating back to their first tenure in Los Angeles (and had finished in last place in their division the previous season), surprised the entire league by making a Super Bowl run, as seven point favorites, by defeating the Tennessee Titans 23–16 in Super Bowl XXXIV at the Georgia Dome.

== Transactions ==
=== Retirements ===
- On May 2, 1999, John Elway announced his retirement from pro football. He played his entire career with the Denver Broncos.
- On July 27, 1999, Barry Sanders announced he was retiring from pro football. His retirement was made public by faxing a letter to the Wichita Eagle, his hometown newspaper.

=== Draft ===
The 1999 NFL draft was held from April 17 to 18, 1999, at New York City's Theater at Madison Square Garden. With the first pick, the Cleveland Browns selected quarterback Tim Couch from the University of Kentucky.

=== Expansion draft ===
Held on February 9, 1999, 150 players were left unprotected by their teams for the Browns to select in the 1999 NFL expansion draft. With the first overall pick, the Browns selected center Jim Pyne from the Detroit Lions.

== Referee changes ==
Jerry Markbreit retired prior to the 1999 season. He joined the NFL in 1976 as a line judge before being promoted to referee in just his second year. He is the only NFL referee to officiate four Super Bowl games: Super Bowl XVII, Super Bowl XXI, Super Bowl XXVI, and Super Bowl XXIX. Jeff Triplette was promoted from back judge to referee to replace Markbreit.

== Major rule changes ==
- Clipping became illegal around the line of scrimmage just as it was on the rest of the field.
- A new instant replay system (different from the one used from 1986 to 1991) is adopted to aid officiating. The system mirrors a method used by the defunct USFL in 1985:
  - In each game, each team has two challenge flags that can be thrown to start an official review of the play in question. Each challenge will require the use of a team's timeout. If the challenge is successful, the timeout is restored.
  - Inside of two minutes of each half, and during all overtime periods, all reviews will be initiated by a Replay Assistant. The Replay Assistant has an unlimited number of reviews, regardless of how many timeouts each team has left. And no timeout will be charged for any review by the Replay Assistant.
  - All replay reviews will be conducted by the referee on a field-level monitor. A decision will be reversed only when there is indisputable visual evidence to overturn the call. The referee has 90 seconds to review the play.
  - The officials will be notified of a replay request or challenge via a specialized electronic pager with a vibrating alert. Each head coach would also have a red flag to use as a backup to get the attention of the officials to challenge a play.
  - The replay system will only cover the following situations:
    - Scoring plays
    - Pass complete/incomplete/intercepted
    - Runner/receiver out of bounds
    - Recovery of a loose ball in or out of bounds
    - Touching of a forward pass, either by an ineligible receiver or a defensive player
    - Quarterback pass or fumble
    - Illegal forward pass
    - Forward or backward pass
    - Runner ruled not down by contact
    - Forward progress in regard to a first down
    - Touching of a kick
    - Too many men on the field

The league also added the following then-minor rule change that became significant in the playoffs a few years later:

When a Team A player is holding the ball to pass it forward, any intentional forward movement of his hand starts a forward pass, even if the player loses possession of the ball as he is attempting to tuck it back toward his body. Also, if the player has tucked the ball into his body and then loses possession, it is a fumble.

This new interpretation of a forward pass would later be commonly known as the "Tuck Rule", and was repealed in 2013.

== 1999 deaths ==
=== Pro Football Hall of Fame ===
- Walter Payton: Having retired as the NFL's all-time leading rusher, Payton died on November 1, 1999, from a rare liver disease known as primary sclerosing cholangitis.

== Notable Retirements ==
- John Elway
- Barry Sanders
- Reggie White

== Regular season ==
=== Scheduling formula ===
Inter-conference
AFC East vs NFC East
AFC Central vs NFC West
AFC West vs NFC Central

Highlights of the 1999 season included:

- Thanksgiving: Two games were played on Thursday, November 25, featuring Chicago at Detroit and Miami at Dallas, with Detroit and Dallas winning.

AFC East
	W	L	T	PCT	PF	PA	STK
^{(2)} Indianapolis Colts	13	3	0	.813	423	333	L1
^{(5)} Buffalo Bills	11	5	0	.688	320	229	W3
^{(6)} Miami Dolphins	9	7	0	.563	326	336	L2
New York Jets	8	8	0	.500	308	309	W4
New England Patriots	8	8	0	.500	299	284	W1

AFC Central
	W	L	T	PCT	PF	PA	STK
^{(1)} Jacksonville Jaguars	14	2	0	.875	396	217	W1
^{(4)} Tennessee Titans	13	3	0	.813	392	324	W4
Baltimore Ravens	8	8	0	.500	324	277	L1
Pittsburgh Steelers	6	10	0	.375	317	320	L1
Cincinnati Bengals	4	12	0	.250	283	460	L2
Cleveland Browns	2	14	0	.125	217	437	L6

AFC West
	W	L	T	PCT	PF	PA	STK
^{(3)} Seattle Seahawks	9	7	0	.563	338	298	L1
Kansas City Chiefs	9	7	0	.563	390	322	L2
San Diego Chargers	8	8	0	.500	269	316	W2
Oakland Raiders	8	8	0	.500	390	329	W1
Denver Broncos	6	10	0	.375	314	318	L1

NFC East
	W	L	T	PCT	PF	PA	STK
^{(3)} Washington Redskins	10	6	0	.625	443	377	W2
^{(5)} Dallas Cowboys	8	8	0	.500	352	276	W1
New York Giants	7	9	0	.438	299	358	L3
Arizona Cardinals	6	10	0	.375	245	382	L4
Philadelphia Eagles	5	11	0	.313	272	357	W2

NFC Central
	W	L	T	PCT	PF	PA	STK
^{(2)} Tampa Bay Buccaneers	11	5	0	.688	270	235	W2
^{(4)} Minnesota Vikings	10	6	0	.625	399	335	W3
^{(6)} Detroit Lions	8	8	0	.500	322	323	L4
Green Bay Packers	8	8	0	.500	357	341	W1
Chicago Bears	6	10	0	.375	272	341	L2

NFC West
	W	L	T	PCT	PF	PA	STK
^{(1)} St. Louis Rams	13	3	0	.813	526	242	L1
Carolina Panthers	8	8	0	.500	421	381	W1
Atlanta Falcons	5	11	0	.313	285	380	W2
San Francisco 49ers	4	12	0	.250	295	453	L3
New Orleans Saints	3	13	0	.188	260	434	L1

=== Tiebreakers ===
- Miami was the third AFC Wild Card ahead of Kansas City based on a better record against common opponents (6–1 to Chiefs' 5–3).
- N.Y. Jets finished ahead of New England in the AFC East based on a better division record (4–4 to Patriots' 2–6).
- Seattle finished ahead of Kansas City in the AFC West based on a head-to-head sweep (2–0).
- San Diego finished ahead of Oakland in the AFC West based on a better division record (5–3 to Raiders' 3–5).
- Arguably, the NFC this year presents the most difficult implementation of the NFL's tiebreaker system.
  - Four teams were tied at 8–8 for the last 2 wild card spots. When 3 or more teams are tied, and 2 or more are from the same division, the within-division tiebreakers are evaluated first. In the NFC Central, Detroit and Green Bay had matching records in the first two two-team divisional tiebreakers (1–1 in head-to-head games, and 4–4 in divisional games). But, in the third tiebreaker, games against common opponents, Detroit's record was 7–5 while Green Bay's was 6–6, eliminating Green Bay from the second-ranked wild card spot.
  - With 3 teams from 3 divisions tied, the first three-or-more-teams tiebreaker did not apply since none had beaten the other two. The second tiebreaker is record within the conference, and here Dallas and Detroit had records of 7–5, while Carolina had a record of 6–6. Carolina was thus ranked 3rd of four, and eliminated from the second-ranked wild card spot.
  - With two teams remaining for the second-ranked wild card spot, the contest reverts to the first step of the two-team non-divisional tiebreaker. Since the teams did not play head-to-head, the second tiebreaker, best record against common opponents gave the second-ranked wild card to Dallas since they had a better record (4–2 to the Lions' 3–3).
  - The tiebreaker then reset to determine the final wild card spot. As before, Detroit's advantage over Green Bay against common opponents eliminated the Packers, leaving only Detroit and Carolina in the tiebreaker. Detroit had defeated Carolina in Week 7, giving the Lions the final wild card spot by head-to-head victory.
  - Coverage on ESPN's NFL Primetime intimated that both Green Bay and Carolina "ran up the score" in early-afternoon games on the last day of the season to position themselves better concerning the fourth tiebreaker (points ± within the conference). Had the Giants beaten the Cowboys in the later game, there would have been a four-way tie at 8–8 between the N.Y. Giants, Detroit, Green Bay, and Carolina for two wild card spots. Detroit would have advanced in the second-ranked wild card spot based on their common games advantage over Green Bay and their 7–5 conference record compared to N.Y. Giants and Carolina's 6–6. For the last spot between the three teams all from different divisions, for which conference record was tied and there were no common opponents, Green Bay's lead in the points ± within conference tiebreaker would therefore have been decisive over the N.Y. Giants and Carolina in the specific case that those three teams tied for the last wild card spot. With the Dallas victory, the points ± tiebreaker did not take effect.
  - Had the Dallas and N.Y. Giants game ended in a tie, there would have been a three-way tie at 8–8 between Detroit, Green Bay, and Carolina for two wild card spots. Detroit would have taken the second-ranked wild card spot via common games and head-to-head victory as before, leaving only Green Bay and Carolina tied. Carolina had defeated Green Bay in Week 14, which would have given the Panthers the final wild card spot by head-to-head victory in the specific case that those two teams tied for the last wild card spot.

== Playoffs ==
Jan 8 – FedExField	Jan 15 – Raymond James Stadium
6	Detroit	13
3	Washington	13
3	Washington	27	Jan 23 – Trans World Dome
2	Tampa Bay	14
NFC
Jan 9 – Hubert H. Humphrey Metrodome	2	Tampa Bay	6
Jan 16 – Trans World Dome
1	St. Louis	11
5	Dallas	10	NFC Championship
4	Minnesota	37
4	Minnesota	27	Jan 30 – Georgia Dome
1	St. Louis	49
Wild-card round
Divisional round
Jan 8 – Adelphia Coliseum	N1	St. Louis	23
Jan 16 – RCA Dome
A4	Tennessee	16
5	Buffalo	16	Super Bowl XXXIV
4	Tennessee	19
4	Tennessee	22	Jan 23 – Alltel Stadium
2	Indianapolis	16
AFC
Jan 9 – Kingdome	4	Tennessee	33
Jan 15 – Alltel Stadium
1	Jacksonville	14
6	Miami	20	AFC Championship
6	Miami	7
3	Seattle	17
1	Jacksonville	62

== Statistical leaders ==
=== Team ===
Points scored	St. Louis Rams (526)
Total yards gained	St. Louis Rams (6,412)
Yards rushing	San Francisco 49ers (2,095)
Yards passing	St. Louis Rams (4,353)
Fewest points allowed	Jacksonville Jaguars (217)
Fewest total yards allowed	Buffalo Bills (4,045)
Fewest rushing yards allowed	St. Louis Rams (1,189)
Fewest passing yards allowed	Buffalo Bills (2,675)

=== Individual ===
Scoring	Mike Vanderjagt, Indianapolis (145 points)
Touchdowns	Stephen Davis, Washington and Edgerrin James, Indianapolis (17 TDs)
Most field goals made	Olindo Mare, Miami (39 FGs)
Rushing	Edgerrin James, Indianapolis (1,553 yards)
Passing	Kurt Warner, St. Louis (109.2 rating)
Passing touchdowns	Kurt Warner, St. Louis (41 TDs)
Pass receiving	Jimmy Smith, Jacksonville (116 catches)
Pass receiving yards	Marvin Harrison, Indianapolis (1,663)
Punt returns	Charlie Rogers, Seattle (14.5 average yards)
Kickoff returns	Tony Horne, St. Louis (29.7 average yards)
Interceptions	Rod Woodson, Baltimore; Sam Madison, Miami; James Hasty, Kansas City; Donnie Abraham, Tampa Bay; and Troy Vincent, Philadelphia (7)
Punting	Tom Rouen, Denver (46.5 average yards)
Sacks	Kevin Carter, St. Louis (17)

== Awards ==
Most Valuable Player	Kurt Warner, quarterback, St. Louis
Coach of the Year	Dick Vermeil, St. Louis
Offensive Player of the Year	Marshall Faulk, running back, St. Louis
Defensive Player of the Year	Warren Sapp, defensive tackle, Tampa Bay
Offensive Rookie of the Year	Edgerrin James, running back, Indianapolis
Defensive Rookie of the Year	Jevon Kearse, defensive end, Tennessee
NFL Comeback Player of the Year	Bryant Young, defensive tackle, San Francisco
Walter Payton NFL Man of the Year	Cris Carter, wide receiver, Minnesota
Super Bowl Most Valuable Player	Kurt Warner, quarterback, St. Louis

== Head coach/front office changes ==
=== Head coach ===
- Baltimore Ravens – Brian Billick; replaced Ted Marchibroda who was fired after the 1998 season.
- Carolina Panthers – George Seifert; replaced Dom Capers who was fired after the 1998 season.
- Chicago Bears – Dick Jauron; replaced Dave Wannstedt who was fired after the 1998 season.
- Cleveland Browns – Chris Palmer; hired before the season, first coach of revived Browns.
- Green Bay Packers – Ray Rhodes; replaced Mike Holmgren who resigned to become Head Coach and General Manager of the Seattle Seahawks.
- Kansas City Chiefs – Gunther Cunningham; replaced Marty Schottenheimer who resigned at the end of the 1998 season.
- Philadelphia Eagles – Andy Reid; replaced Ray Rhodes who was fired after the 1998 season.
- San Diego Chargers – Mike Riley; replaced interim head coach June Jones who replaced Kevin Gilbride during the 1998 season.
- Seattle Seahawks – Mike Holmgren; replaced Dennis Erickson who was fired after the 1998 season.

=== Front office ===
- Cleveland Browns – The expansion Browns hired Dwight Clark as their first general manager.
- Carolina Panthers – New head coach George Seifert replaced former head coach Dom Capers as de facto general manager.
- Denver Broncos - Neal Dahlen replaced John Beake, who was reassigned to the position of vice president of administration.
- Minnesota Vikings – Tim Connolly replaced Jeff Diamond as general manager in October 1998. Diamond would later resign as senior vice president in May 1999. Unlike most executives holding the title of general manager, Connolly oversees the team's business operations, and is not involved in player personnel decisions. Football operations are handled by head coach Dennis Green and new director of football administration Rob Brzezinski.
- San Francisco 49ers - Bill Walsh replaced John McVay and Dwight Clark.
- Seattle Seahawks – New head coach Mike Holmgren replaced Bob Whitsitt.
- Washington Redskins - Vinny Cerrato was hired as director of player personnel to replace former general manager Charley Casserly, who was fired by new team owner Daniel Snyder.

== Stadium changes ==
- Baltimore Ravens: Ravens Stadium at Camden Yards was renamed PSINet Stadium after the internet service provider PSINet acquired the naming rights
- Cleveland Browns: The reactivated Browns team moves into Cleveland Browns Stadium
- Tennessee Titans: The renamed Titans moved from Vanderbilt Stadium to Adelphia Coliseum, with the Adelphia Communications Corporation acquiring the naming rights
- Washington Redskins: Jack Kent Cooke Stadium was renamed FedExField after FedEx acquired the naming rights

== New uniforms ==
- The Baltimore Ravens were forced to scrap their original helmet logo, a shield with raven wings displaying a letter "B", because of a trademark dispute. Their new helmet logo featured a purple raven's head with the letter "B" superimposed. The team introduced a new secondary shield logo with alternating Calvert and Crossland emblems similar to the flag of Maryland.
- The reactivated Cleveland Browns restored the team's classic design, but widened the pants stripes and moved the TV numbers from the sleeves to the shoulders.
- The Detroit Lions returned to wearing silver instead of blue pants with their white jerseys. The TV numbers were moved from the sleeves to the shoulders.
- The Philadelphia Eagles added black stripping on the sleeve ends on the green jerseys.
- The renamed Tennessee Titans unveiled new uniforms featuring navy and white jerseys, white helmets, and red trim. White pants were worn with the navy jerseys and navy pants with the white jerseys. The new helmet logo featured a circle with a letter "T" and three stars in a pattern matching those on the Tennessee state flag with a trail of flames.
- The New Orleans Saints switched from gold to black numbers on their white jerseys. They also began wearing black pants with a wide gold stripe with their white jerseys.

== Television ==
This was the second year under the league's eight-year broadcast contracts with ABC, CBS, Fox, and ESPN to televise Monday Night Football, the AFC package, the NFC package, and Sunday Night Football, respectively.

Dan Dierdorf left ABC to return to CBS, joining Verne Lundquist on CBS's #2 crew. Dierdorf replaced Randy Cross, who then became part of an overhauled talent lineup on The NFL Today: Jim Nantz remained as host, but Marcus Allen, Brent Jones, George Seifert, and Michael Lombardi were replaced by Cross, Craig James from CBS College Football Today, and Jerry Glanville who came over from the NFL on Fox. ABC decided to leave Al Michaels and Boomer Esiason in a two-man booth. ABC also dropped Frank Gifford's segments from its MNF pregame show, letting Chris Berman to host the entire 20 minutes. Bonnie Bernstein was promoted to sideline reporter after being a field reporter for the NFL Today pregame show working for Lundquist and Dierdorf, replacing Michele Tafoya who worked as a sideline reporter for the SEC on CBS in 1999, before leaving for ESPN in 2000.
