= 1999 San Diego Chargers season =

NFL team 40th season

- Owner: Alex Spanos
- General manager: Bobby Beathard
- Head coach: Mike Riley
- Home stadium: Qualcomm Stadium

Results
- Record: 8–8
- Division place: 3rd AFC West
- Playoffs: Did not qualify
- All-Pros: 1: LB Junior Seau (2nd team)
- Pro Bowlers: 1: LB Junior Seau

The 1999 season was the San Diego Chargers' 30th in the National Football League (NFL), their 40th overall and their first under head coach Mike Riley.

During the Chargers’ first training camp in preseason, quarterback Ryan Leaf suffered a shoulder injury and missed the entire season. Following a 4–1 start, the Chargers suffered six straight losses before winning four of their final five games to finish 8–8.

== Offseason ==
=== NFL draft ===
1999 San Diego Chargers draft
Round	Pick	Player	Position	College	Notes
2	60	Jermaine Fazande	Running back	Oklahoma	from Atlanta
3	69	Steve Heiden	Tight end	South Dakota State	
4	104	Jason Perry	Safety	North Carolina State	
5	139	Adrian Dingle	Defensive end	Clemson	from Chicago
5	141	Reggie Nelson	Tackle	McNeese State	
6	178	Tyrone Bell	Cornerback	North Alabama	
Made roster * Made at least one Pro Bowl during career

== Personnel ==
=== Staff ===
1999 San Diego Chargers staff
Front office: Chairman of the board – Alex Spanos; President and vice chairman – Dean Spanos; General manager – Bobby Beathard; Director of player personnel – Billy Devaney; Director of pro personnel – Greg Gaines; Coordinator of football operations – Ed McGuire; Head coaches: Head coach – Mike Riley; Offensive coaches: Offensive coordinator/quarterbacks – Geep Chryst; Running backs – Ollie Wilson; Wide receivers – Mike Sanford; Tight ends – Paul Chryst; Offensive line – Joe Bugel; Offensive assistant – DelVaughn Alexander	Defensive coaches: Defensive coordinator – Joe Pascale; Defensive line – Wayne Nunnely; Linebackers – Jim Vechiarella; Defensive backs – Rod Perry; Defensive assistant/secondary – Mark Banker; Defensive assistant – Kevin Lempa; Special teams coaches: Special teams – Bruce Read; Special teams assistant – Johnny Thomas; Strength and conditioning: Strength and conditioning – John Hastings; Assistant strength and conditioning – Mike Schleelein

=== Roster ===
1999 San Diego Chargers roster
Quarterbacks (QB): 11 Sherdrick Bonner; 4 Jim Harbaugh; 13 Moses Moreno; Running backs (RB): 43 Kenny Bynum; 35 Jermaine Fazande; 41 Terrell Fletcher; 44 Fred McCrary FB; 20 Natrone Means; 34 Tremayne Stephens KR; Wide receivers (WR): 81 Jeff Graham; 82 Charlie Jones PR; 87 Chris Penn PR; 85 Robert Reed; 86 Mikhael Ricks; Tight ends (TE): 84 Reggie Davis; 83 Steve Heiden; 88 Freddie Jones	Offensive linemen (OL): 60 Wilbert Brown G; 67 Roman Fortin C; 71 DeMingo Graham G; 65 John Jackson T; 66 Reggie Nelson T; 70 Vaughn Parker T; 74 Raleigh Roundtree G/T; 73 Aaron Taylor G; Defensive linemen (DL): 90 Adrian Dingle DE; 95 Albert Fontenot DE; 96 Norman Hand DT; 92 Cedric Harden DE; 99 Raylee Johnson DE; 98 Mike Mohring DE/DT; 97 John Parrella DT; 76 Jamal Williams DT	Linebackers (LB): 58 Lewis Bush OLB; 51 Gerald Dixon OLB; 53 Michael Hamilton OLB; 54 Eric Hill MLB; 52 John Reeves OLB; 56 Orlando Ruff MLB; 55 Junior Seau OLB; Defensive backs (DB): 24 Fakhir Brown CB; 27 Charles Dimry CB; 38 Mike Dumas FS; 37 Rodney Harrison SS; 42 Greg Jackson SS; 26 Darryll Lewis CB; 31 Jason Perry FS; 25 Reggie Rusk CB/S; 29 Terrance Shaw CB; 21 Scott Turner CB; Special teams (ST): 2 Darren Bennett P; 50 David Binn LS; 3 John Carney K	Practice squad: 17 Tim Alexander WR; 89 Chris Knipper TE; -- Rodney Sermons RB; Reserve: -- Jimmie Bell DE (IR); 69 Ben Bordelon T (IR); 59 Jon Haskins LB (IR); -- Israel Ifeanyi DE; 64 Kendyl Jacox C (IR); 12 Erik Kramer QB (IR); 16 Ryan Leaf QB (IR); 22 Jimmy Spencer CB (IR); Rookies in italics 53 active, 8 reserve, 3 practice squad

== Preseason ==
Week	Date	Opponent	Result	Record	Venue	Attendance
1	August 8	vs. Denver Broncos	L 17–20	0–1	Stadium Australia (Sydney, Australia)	
2	August 12	at San Francisco 49ers	L 24–31	0–2	3Com Park	
3	August 21	Miami Dolphins	L 10–13	0–3	Qualcomm Stadium	
4	August 28	at St. Louis Rams	L 21–24	0–4	Trans World Dome	
5	September 3	Kansas City Chiefs	L 27–34	0–5	Qualcomm Stadium	

== Regular season ==
=== Schedule ===
Week	Date	Opponent	Result	Record	Venue	Attendance
1	Bye					
2	September 19	at Cincinnati Bengals	**W** 34–7	1–0	Cinergy Field	47,660
3	September 26	Indianapolis Colts	**L** 19–27	1–1	Qualcomm Stadium	56,942
4	October 3	**Kansas City Chiefs**	**W** 21–14	2–1	Qualcomm Stadium	58,099
5	October 10	at Detroit Lions	**W** 20–10	3–1	Pontiac Silverdome	61,481
6	October 17	**Seattle Seahawks**	**W** 13–10	4–1	Qualcomm Stadium	59,432
7	October 24	Green Bay Packers	**L** 3–31	4–2	Qualcomm Stadium	68,274
8	October 31	at **Kansas City Chiefs**	**L** 0–34	4–3	Arrowhead Stadium	78,473
9	November 7	**Denver Broncos**	**L** 17–33	4–4	Qualcomm Stadium	61,204
10	November 14	at **Oakland Raiders**	**L** 9–28	4–5	Network Associates Coliseum	43,353
11	November 21	Chicago Bears	**L** 20–23 (OT)	4–6	Qualcomm Stadium	56,055
12	November 28	at Minnesota Vikings	**L** 27–35	4–7	Hubert H. Humphrey Metrodome	64,232
13	December 5	Cleveland Browns	**W** 23–10	5–7	Qualcomm Stadium	53,147
14	December 12	at **Seattle Seahawks**	**W** 19–16	6–7	Kingdome	66,318
15	December 19	at Miami Dolphins	**L** 9–12	6–8	Pro Player Stadium	73,765
16	December 26	**Oakland Raiders**	**W** 23–20	7–8	Qualcomm Stadium	63,846
17	January 2	at **Denver Broncos**	**W** 12–6	8–8	Mile High Stadium	69,278
Note: Intra-division opponents are in **bold** text.

=== Game summaries ===
==== Week 2: at Cincinnati Bengals ====
Week Two: San Diego Chargers at Cincinnati Bengals – Game summary

Quarter	1	2	3	4	Total
**Chargers**	13	15	3	3	**34**
Bengals	7	0	0	0	**7**

at Cinergy Field, Cincinnati, Ohio

- Date: September 19
- Game time: 10:00 a.m. PDT / 1:00 p.m. EDT
- Game weather: 79 °F (26 °C), wind 5 MPH
- Game attendance: 47,660
- Referee: Johnny Grier
- TV announcers (CBS): Tim Brando, Charles Mann
- Box score

Game information

**First quarter**

- CIN – Tony McGee 12-yard pass from Jeff Blake (Doug Pelfrey kick), 12:04. Bengals 7–0. **Drive: 6 plays, 66 yards, 2:56.**
- SDG – John Carney 27-yard field goal, 9:28. Bengals 7–3. **Drive: 4 plays, -6 yards, 1:14.**
- SDG – John Carney 23-yard field goal, 3:07. Bengals 7–6. **Drive: 9 plays, 62 yards, 4:14.**
- SDG – Natrone Means 12-yard pass from Jim Harbaugh (John Carney kick), 1:39. Chargers 13–7. **Drive: 3 plays, 20 yards, 1:17.**

**Second quarter**

- SDG – Jeff Graham 29-yard pass from Jim Harbaugh (John Carney kick), 2:08. Chargers 20–7. **Drive: 3 plays, 43 yards, 1:10.**
- SDG – Gerald Dixon 27-yard fumble return (Jim Harbaugh pass to Mikhael Ricks), 0:54. Chargers 28–7.

**Third quarter**

- SDG – John Carney 21-yard field goal, 4:45. Chargers 31–7. **Drive: 8 plays, 33 yards, 4:50.**

**Fourth quarter**

- SDG – John Carney 42-yard field goal, 14:50. Chargers 34–7. **Drive: 11 plays, 28 yards, 4:40.**

**Top passers**

- SDG – Jim Harbaugh – 15/27, 159 yards, 2 TD
- CIN – Akili Smith – 10/17, 100 yards, INT

**Top rushers**

- SDG – Natrone Means – 27 rushes, 79 yards
- CIN – Corey Dillon – 12 rushes, 37 yards

**Top receivers**

- SDG – Mikhael Ricks – 4 receptions, 86 yards
- CIN – Darnay Scott – 6 receptions, 88 yards

==== Week 3: vs. Indianapolis Colts ====
Week Three: Indianapolis Colts at San Diego Chargers – Game summary

Quarter	1	2	3	4	Total
**Colts**	10	0	3	14	**27**
Chargers	0	16	3	0	**19**

at Qualcomm Stadium, San Diego, California

- Date: September 26
- Game time: 1:05 p.m. PDT
- Game weather: 71 °F (22 °C), wind 8 MPH
- Game attendance: 56,942
- Referee: Bob McElwee
- TV announcers (CBS): Gus Johnson & Brent Jones
- Box score

Game information

**First quarter**

- IND – Mike Vanderjagt 35-yard field goal, 5:50. Colts 3–0. **Drive: 11 plays, 49 yards, 6:02.**
- IND – Marvin Harrison 33-yard pass from Peyton Manning (Mike Vanderjagt kick), 1:19. Colts 10–0. **Drive: 7 plays, 69 yards, 2:49.**

**Second quarter**

- SDG – Natrone Means 1-yard run (John Carney kick), 11:38. Colts 10–7. **Drive: 8 plays, 75 yards, 4:41.**
- SDG – Darryll Lewis blocked punt recovered in end zone (John Carney kick), 10:29. Chargers 14–10.
- SDG – safety, ball snapped out of end zone, 2:45. Chargers 16–10.

**Third quarter**

- SDG – John Carney 50-yard field goal, 8:26. Chargers 19–10. **Drive: 12 plays, 34 yards, 6:34.**
- IND – Mike Vanderjagt 42-yard field goal, 4:13. Chargers 19–13. **Drive: 9 plays, 45 yards, 4:13.**

**Fourth quarter**

- IND – Peyton Manning 12-yard run (Mike Vanderjagt kick), 11:41. Colts 20–19. **Drive: 8 plays, 83 yards, 2:47.**
- IND – Terrence Wilkins 26-yard pass from Peyton Manning (Mike Vanderjagt kick), 2:34. Colts 27–19. **Drive: 10 plays, 69 yards, 5:01.**

**Top passers**

- IND – Peyton Manning – 29/54, 404 yards, 2 TD, INT
- SDG – Jim Harbaugh – 15/37, 188 yards, INT

**Top rushers**

- IND – Edgerrin James – 17 rushes, 46 yards
- SDG – Natrone Means – 19 rushes, 59 yards, TD

**Top receivers**

- IND – Marvin Harrison – 13 receptions, 196 yards, TD
- SDG – Jeff Graham – 4 receptions, 48 yards

==== Week 4: vs. Kansas City Chiefs ====
Week Four: Kansas City Chiefs at San Diego Chargers – Game summary

Quarter	1	2	3	4	Total
Chiefs	14	0	0	0	**14**
**Chargers**	0	14	7	0	**21**

at Qualcomm Stadium, San Diego, California

- Date: October 3
- Game time: 1:15 p.m. PDT
- Game weather: 76 °F (24 °C), wind 7 MPH
- Game attendance: 58,099
- Referee: Ed Hochuli
- TV announcers (CBS): Don Criqui & Steve Tasker
- Box score

Game information

**First quarter**

- KAN – Joe Horn 31-yard pass from Elvis Grbac (Pete Stoyanovich kick), 9:42. Chiefs 7–0. **Drive: 2 plays, 42 yards, 0:48.**
- KAN – Tony Gonzalez 12-yard pass from Elvis Grbac (Pete Stoyanovich kick), 1:40. Chiefs 14–0. **Drive: 4 plays, 23 yards, 1:57.**

**Second quarter**

- SDG – Natrone Means 4-yard run (John Carney kick), 7:20. Chiefs 14–7. **Drive: 2 plays, 10 yards, 0:43.**
- SDG – Kenny Bynum 18-yard pass from Erik Kramer (John Carney kick), 1:41. Tied 14–14. **Drive: 2 plays, 18 yards, 0:11.**

**Third quarter**

- SDG – Chris Penn 11-yard pass from Erik Kramer (John Carney kick), 10:57. Chargers 21–14. **Drive: 3 plays, 22 yards, 1:19.**

**Fourth quarter**

- No scoring plays.

**Top passers**

- KAN – Elvis Grbac – 19/40, 200 yards, 2 TD, 4 INT
- SDG – Erik Kramer – 8/20, 72 yards, 2 TD, INT

**Top rushers**

- KAN – Rashaan Shehee – 22 rushes, 86 yards
- SDG – Natrone Means – 14 rushes, 26 yards, TD

**Top receivers**

- KAN – Tony Gonzalez – 7 receptions, 68 yards, TD
- SDG – Freddie Jones – 4 receptions, 48 yards

==== Week 5: at Detroit Lions ====
Week Five: San Diego Chargers at Detroit Lions – Game summary

Quarter	1	2	3	4	Total
**Chargers**	0	10	3	7	**20**
Lions	7	3	0	0	**10**

at Pontiac Silverdome, Pontiac, Michigan

- Date: October 10
- Game time: 10:00 a.m. PDT / 1:00 p.m. EDT
- Game weather: None (indoor stadium)
- Game attendance: 61,481
- Referee: Walt Coleman
- TV announcers (CBS): Gus Johnson & Brent Jones
- Box score

Game information

**First quarter**

- DET – Germane Crowell 41-yard pass from Charlie Batch (Jason Hanson kick), 5:20. Lions 7–0. **Drive: 7 plays, 73 yards, 4:20.**

**Second quarter**

- SDG – John Carney 33-yard field goal, 13:22. Lions 7–3. **Drive: 12 plays, 69 yards, 4:50.**
- DET – Jason Hanson 23-yard field goal, 6:53. Lions 10–3. **Drive: 13 plays, 60 yards, 6:29.**
- SDG – Tremayne Stephens 3-yard run (John Carney kick), 0:42. Tied 10–10. **Drive: 11 plays, 80 yards, 6:11.**

**Third quarter**

- SDG – John Carney 24-yard field goal, 9:48. Chargers 13–10. **Drive: 4 plays, 7 yards, 1:28.**

**Fourth quarter**

- SDG – Darryll Lewis 42-yard fumble return (John Carney kick), 7:52. Chargers 20–10.

**Top passers**

- SDG – Erik Kramer – 20/34, 208 yards, INT
- DET – Charlie Batch – 21/38, 230 yards, TD, INT

**Top rushers**

- SDG – Kenny Bynum – 9 rushes, 37 yards
- DET – Ron Rivers – 13 rushes, 30 yards

**Top receivers**

- SDG – Chris Penn – 7 receptions, 79 yards
- DET – Germane Crowell – 6 receptions, 99 yards, TD

==== Week 6: vs. Seattle Seahawks ====
Week Six: Seattle Seahawks at San Diego Chargers – Game summary

Quarter	1	2	3	4	Total
Seahawks	0	3	7	0	**10**
**Chargers**	0	7	0	6	**13**

at Qualcomm Stadium, San Diego, California

- Date: October 17
- Game time: 1:05 p.m. PDT
- Game weather: 78 °F (26 °C), wind 9 MPH
- Game attendance: 59,432
- Referee: Bill Carollo
- TV announcers (CBS): Ian Eagle and Mark May
- Box score

Game information

**First quarter**

- No scoring plays.

**Second quarter**

- SEA – Todd Peterson 40-yard field goal, 4:13. Seahawks 3–0. **Drive: 9 plays, 57 yards, 4:32.**
- SDG – Natrone Means 5-yard run (John Carney kick), 0:42. Chargers 7–3. **Drive: 6 plays, 34 yards, 2:02.**

**Third quarter**

- SEA – Itula Mili 1-yard pass from Jon Kitna (Todd Peterson kick), 8:28. Seahawks 10–7. **Drive: 6 plays, 34 yards, 2:11.**

**Fourth quarter**

- SDG – John Carney 28-yard field goal, 2:54. Tied 10–10. **Drive: 5 plays, 45 yards, 2:39.**
- SDG – John Carney 41-yard field goal, 0:00. Chargers 13–10. **Drive: 6 plays, 45 yards, 1:34.**

**Top passers**

- SEA – Jon Kitna – 17/29, 151 yards, TD, INT
- SDG – Erik Kramer – 27/44, 296 yards, 4 INT

**Top rushers**

- SEA – Ricky Watters – 21 rushes, 54 yards
- SDG – Natrone Means – 17 rushes, 35 yards, TD

**Top receivers**

- SEA – Christian Fauria – 4 receptions, 60 yards
- SDG – Jeff Graham – 6 receptions, 92 yards

==== Week 7: vs. Green Bay Packers ====
Week Seven: Green Bay Packers at San Diego Chargers – Game summary

Quarter	1	2	3	4	Total
**Packers**	7	7	14	3	**31**
Chargers	0	3	0	0	**3**

at Qualcomm Stadium, San Diego, Stadium

- Date: October 24
- Game time: 1:05 p.m. PDT
- Game weather: 78 °F (26 °C), wind 8 MPH
- Game attendance: 68,274
- Referee: Bob McElwee
- TV announcers (Fox): Curt Menefee & Brian Baldinger
- Box score

Game information

**First quarter**

- GB – William Henderson 7-yard pass from Brett Favre (Ryan Longwell kick), 0:21. Packers 7–0. **Drive: 8 plays, 80 yards, 4:02.**

**Second quarter**

- GB – Dorsey Levens 6-yard run (Ryan Longwell kick), 13:19. Packers 14–0. **Drive: 4 plays, 28 yards, 1:34.**
- SDG – John Carney 28-yard field goal, 4:01. Packers 14–3. **Drive: 10 plays, 25 yards, 5:33.**

**Third quarter**

- GB – Bill Schroeder 6-yard pass from Brett Favre (Ryan Longwell kick), 11:48. Packers 21–3. **Drive: 3 plays, 60 yards, 0:58.**
- GB – Antonio Freeman 3-yard pass from Brett Favre (Ryan Longwell kick), 0:00. Packers 28–3. **Drive: 14 plays, 99 yards, 7:05.**

**Fourth quarter**

- GB – Ryan Longwell 46-yard field goal, 1:54. Packers 31–3. **Drive: 8 plays, 38 yards, 4:14.**

**Top passers**

- GB – Brett Favre – 12/22, 173 yards, 3 TD, INT
- SDG – Erik Kramer – 18/36, 161 yards, 3 INT

**Top rushers**

- GB – Dorsey Levens – 21 rushes, 71 yards, TD
- SDG – Kenny Bynum – 6 rushes, 30 yards

**Top receivers**

- GB – Antonio Freeman – 5 receptions, 82 yards, TD
- SDG – Freddie Jones – 7 receptions, 87 yards

==== Week 8: at Kansas City Chiefs ====
Week Eight: San Diego Chargers at Kansas City Chiefs – Game summary

Quarter	1	2	3	4	Total
Chargers	0	0	0	0	**0**
**Chiefs**	10	10	14	0	**34**

at Arrowhead Stadium, Kansas City, Missouri

- Date: October 31
- Game time: 10:00 a.m. PST / 12:00 p.m. CST
- Game weather: 65 °F (18 °C), wind 10 MPH
- Game attendance: 78,473
- Referee: Phil Luckett
- TV announcers (CBS): Verne Lundquist, Dan Dierdorf, Bonnie Bernstein
- Box score

Game information

**First quarter**

- KAN – Pete Stoyanovich 43-yard field goal, 10:11. Chiefs 3–0. **Drive: 4 plays, -9 yards, 1:30.**
- KAN – Reggie Tongue 7-yard fumble return (Pete Stoyanovich kick), 7:50. Chiefs 10–0.

**Second quarter**

- KAN – Pete Stoyanovich 39-yard field goal, 9:59. Chiefs 13–0. **Drive: 12 plays, 42 yards, 6:38.**
- KAN – Joe Horn 9-yard pass from Elvis Grbac (Pete Stoyanovich kick), 2:35. **Drive: 8 plays, 77 yards, 4:19.**

**Third quarter**

- KAN – Derrick Alexander 81-yard pass from Elvis Grbac (Pete Stoyanovich kick), 3:27. Chiefs 27–0. **Drive: 3 plays, 88 yards, 1:24.**
- KAN – Donnell Bennett 7-yard run (Pete Stoyanovich kick), 2:58. Chiefs 34–0. **Drive: 2 plays, 7 yards, 0:11.**

**Fourth quarter**

- No scoring plays.

**Top passers**

- SDG – Jim Harbaugh – 18/34, 174 yards, INT
- KAN – Elvis Grbac – 11/15, 194 yards, 2 TD

**Top rushers**

- SDG – Kenny Bynum – 12 rushes, 55 yards
- KAN – Mike Cloud – 7 rushes, 21 yards

**Top receivers**

- SDG – Freddie Jones – 4 receptions, 57 yards
- KAN – Derrick Alexander – 2 receptions, 113 yards, TD

==== Week 9: vs. Denver Broncos ====
Week Nine: Denver Broncos at San Diego Chargers – Game summary

Quarter	1	2	3	4	Total
**Broncos**	3	10	7	13	**33**
Chargers	0	3	7	7	**17**

at Qualcomm Stadium, San Diego, California

- Date: November 7
- Game time: 1:15 p.m. PST
- Game weather: 69 °F (21 °C), wind 7 MPH
- Game attendance: 61,204
- Referee: Dick Hantak
- TV announcers (CBS): Kevin Harlan, Sam Wyche
- Box score

Game information

**First quarter**

- DEN – Jason Elam 44-yard field goal, 8:50. Broncos 3–0. **Drive: 11 plays, 27 yards, 6:10.**

**Second quarter**

- DEN – Bill Romanowski 18-yard interception return (Jason Elam kick), 13:20. Broncos 10–0.
- SDG – John Carney 46-yard field goal, 5:51. Broncos 10–3. **Drive: 14 plays, 51 yards, 7:29.**
- DEN – Jason Elam 55-yard field goal, 0:00. Broncos 13–3. **Drive: 9 plays, 43 yards, 1:49.**

**Third quarter**

- DEN – Olandis Gary 23-yard run (Jason Elam kick), 8:28. Broncos 20–3. **Drive: 2 plays, 31 yards, 0:44.**
- SDG – Freddie Jones 7-yard pass from Jim Harbaugh (John Carney kick), 3:10. Broncos 20–10. **Drive: 10 plays, 87 yards, 5:18.**

**Fourth quarter**

- DEN – Jason Elam 41-yard field goal, 13:26. Broncos 23–10. **Drive: 9 plays, 43 yards, 4:44.**
- SDG – Charlie Jones 44-yard pass from Jim Harbaugh (John Carney kick), 9:17. Broncos 23–17. **Drive: 8 plays, 74 yards, 4:09.**
- DEN – Jason Elam 24-yard field goal, 4:18. Broncos 26–17. **Drive: 9 plays, 32 yards, 3:19.**
- DEN – Olandis Gary 5-yard run (Jason Elam kick), 1:56. Broncos 33–17. **Drive: 3 plays, 9 yards, 1:19.**

**Top passers**

- DEN – Chris Miller – 14/24, 166 yards
- SDG – Jim Harbaugh – 25/39, 235 yards, 2 TD, 2 INT

**Top rushers**

- DEN – Olandis Gary – 30 rushes, 108 yards, 2 TD
- SDG – Kenny Bynum – 11 rushes, 24 yards

**Top receivers**

- DEN – Rod Smith – 5 receptions, 70 yards
- SDG – Freddie Jones – 4 receptions, 65 yards, TD

==== Week 10: at Oakland Raiders ====
Week Ten: San Diego Chargers at Oakland Raiders – Game summary

Quarter	1	2	3	4	Total
Chargers	0	0	3	6	**9**
**Raiders**	14	0	7	7	**28**

at Network Associates Coliseum, Oakland, California

- Date: November 14
- Game time: 10:00 a.m. PST
- Game weather: 67 °F (19 °C), wind 5 MPH
- Game attendance: 43,353
- Referee: Tom White
- TV announcers (CBS): Verne Lundquist, Dan Dierdorf, Bonnie Bernstein
- Box score

Game information

**First quarter**

- OAK – Tyrone Wheatley 26-yard pass from Rich Gannon (Michael Husted kick), 10:13. Raiders 7–0. **Drive: 3 plays, 46 yards, 1:29.**
- OAK – Rickey Dudley 2-yard pass from Rich Gannon (Michael Husted kick), 0:39. Raiders 14–0. **Drive: 12 plays, 97 yards, 6:39.**

**Second quarter**

- No scoring plays.

**Third quarter**

- SDG – John Carney 39-yard field goal, 8:44. Raiders 14–3. **Drive: 10 plays, 44 yards, 6:16.**
- OAK – Tyrone Wheatley 7-yard pass from Rich Gannon (Michael Husted kick), 3:07. Raiders 21–3. **Drive: 10 plays, 72 yards, 5:37.**

**Fourth quarter**

- OAK – Rickey Dudley 12-yard pass from Rich Gannon (Michael Husted kick), 5:58. Raiders 28–3. **Drive: 10 plays, 69 yards, 5:25.**
- SDG – Freddie Jones 11-yard pass from Jim Harbaugh (pass failed), 0:44. Raiders 28–9. **Drive: 14 plays, 66 yards, 5:14.**

**Top passers**

- SDG – Jim Harbaugh – 18/32, 204 yards, TD
- OAK – Rich Gannon – 18/24, 254 yards, 4 TD

**Top rushers**

- SDG – Jermaine Fazande – 13 rushes, 29 yards
- OAK – Napoleon Kaufman – 12 rushes, 65 yards

**Top receivers**

- SDG – Jeff Graham – 3 receptions, 66 yards
- OAK – Tim Brown – 7 receptions, 117 yards

==== Week 11: vs. Chicago Bears ====
Week Eleven: Chicago Bears at San Diego Chargers – Game summary

Quarter	1	2	3	4	OT	Total
**Bears**	0	3	14	3	3	**23**
Chargers	7	3	0	10	0	**20**

at Qualcomm Stadium, San Diego, California

- Date: November 21
- Game time: 1:15 p.m. PST
- Game weather: 64 °F (18 °C), wind 7 MPH
- Game attendance: 56,055
- Referee: Ed Hochuli
- TV announcers (Fox): Ray Bentley & Ron Pitts
- Box score

Game information

**First quarter**

- SDG – Reggie Davis 2-yard pass from Jim Harbaugh (John Carney kick), 5:53. Chargers 7–0. **Drive: 10 plays, 53 yards, 5:25.**

**Second quarter**

- CHI – Chris Boniol 29-yard field goal, 9:46. Chargers 7–3. **Drive: 9 plays, 50 yards, 4:37.**
- SDG – John Carney 28-yard field goal, 2:47. Chargers 10–3. **Drive: 13 plays, 53 yards, 6:59.**

**Third quarter**

- CHI – Marcus Robinson 38-yard pass from Jim Miller (Chris Boniol kick), 5:26. Tied 10–10. **Drive: 4 plays, 68 yards, 1:55.**
- CHI – Curtis Enis 3-yard run (Chris Boniol kick), 2:30. Bears 17–10. **Drive: 4 plays, 51 yards, 1:40.**

**Fourth quarter**

- CHI – Chris Boniol 26-yard field goal, 5:22. Bears 20–10. **Drive: 8 plays, 65 yards, 3:40.**
- SDG – Tremayne Stephens 13-yard pass from Jim Harbaugh (John Carney kick), 4:03. Bears 20–17. **Drive: 3 plays, 64 yards, 1:19.**
- SDG – John Carney 28-yard field goal, 0:01. Tied 20–20. **Drive: 9 plays, 67 yards, 1:53.**

**Overtime**

- CHI – Chris Boniol 36-yard field goal, 10:02. Bears 23–20. **Drive: 10 plays, 59 yards, 4:58.**

**Top passers**

- CHI – Jim Miller – 25/38, 357 yards, TD
- SDG – Jim Harbaugh – 29/46, 273 yards, 2 TD, INT

**Top rushers**

- CHI – Curtis Enis – 19 rushes, 41 yards, TD
- SDG – Jermaine Fazande – 18 rushes, 50 yards

**Top receivers**

- CHI – Marcus Robinson – 6 receptions, 163 yards, TD
- SDG – Jeff Graham – 5 receptions, 83 yards

==== Week 12: at Minnesota Vikings ====
Week Twelve: San Diego Chargers at Minnesota Vikings – Game summary

Quarter	1	2	3	4	Total
Chargers	7	0	17	3	**27**
**Vikings**	0	28	7	0	**35**

at Hubert H. Humphrey Metrodome, Minneapolis, Minnesota

- Date: November 28
- Game time: 10:00 a.m. PST / 12:00 p.m. CST
- Game weather: None (indoor stadium)
- Game attendance: 64,232
- Referee: Ron Blum
- TV announcers (CBS): Kevin Harlan & Sam Wyche
- Box score

Game information

**First quarter**

- SDG – Tremayne Stephens 1-yard run (John Carney kick), 8:34. Chargers 7–0. **Drive: 8 plays, 86 yards, 3:32.**

**Second quarter**

- MIN – Randy Moss 34-yard pass from Jeff George (Gary Anderson kick), 14:55. Tied 7–7. **Drive: 8 plays, 77 yards, 4:43.**
- MIN – Jake Reed 5-yard pass from Jeff George (Gary Anderson kick), 9:13. Vikings 14–7. **Drive: 5 plays, 93 yards, 2:18.**
- MIN – Cris Carter 4-yard pass from Jeff George (Gary Anderson kick), 5:55. Vikings 21–7. **Drive: 4 plays, 27 yards, 1:27.**
- MIN – Leroy Hoard 4-yard run (Gary Anderson kick), 3:44. Vikings 28–7. **Drive: 4 plays, 31 yards, 1:21.**

**Third quarter**

- SDG – Kenny Bynum 80-yard pass from Jim Harbaugh (John Carney kick), 14:40. Vikings 28–14. **Drive: 1 play, 80 yards, 0:20.**
- SDG – Tremayne Stephens 1-yard run (John Carney kick), 10:33. Vikings 28–21. **Drive: 3 plays, 7 yards, 1:03.**
- SDG – John Carney 40-yard field goal, 7:40. Vikings 28–24. **Drive: 6 plays, 37 yards, 1:48.**
- MIN – Cris Carter 34-yard pass from Jeff George (Gary Anderson kick), 4:10. Vikings 35–24. **Drive: 7 plays, 82 yards, 3:30.**

**Fourth quarter**

- SDG – John Carney 40-yard field goal, 11:41. Vikings 35–27. **Drive: 8 plays, 43 yards, 1:53.**

**Top passers**

- SDG – Jim Harbaugh – 25/39, 404 yards, TD, INT
- MIN – Jeff George – 28/43, 363 yards, 4 TD, 2 INT

**Top rushers**

- SDG – Kenny Bynum – 8 rushes, 26 yards
- MIN – Robert Smith – 20 rushes, 104 yards

**Top receivers**

- SDG – Jeff Graham – 6 receptions, 141 yards
- MIN – Cris Carter – 11 receptions, 136 yards, 2 TD

==== Week 13: vs. Cleveland Browns ====
Week Thirteen: Cleveland Browns at San Diego Chargers – Game summary

Quarter	1	2	3	4	Total
Browns	3	7	0	0	**10**
**Chargers**	3	10	3	7	**23**

at Qualcomm Stadium, San Diego, California

- Date: December 5
- Game time: 10:00 a.m. PST
- Game weather: 68 °F (20 °C), wind 7 MPH
- Game attendance: 53,147
- Referee: Tony Corrente
- TV announcers (CBS): Don Criqui & Brent Jones
- Box score

Game information

**First quarter**

- CLE – Phil Dawson 33-yard field goal, 9:30. Browns 3–0. **Drive: 12 plays, 45 yards, 5:30.**
- SDG – John Carney 44-yard field goal, 1:08. Tied 3–3. **Drive: 6 plays, 27 yards, 2:04.**

**Second quarter**

- SDG – John Carney 19-yard field goal, 8:01. Chargers 6–3. **Drive: 9 plays, 63 yards, 4:48.**
- SDG – Kenny Bynum 1-yard run (John Carney kick), 2:11. Chargers 13–6. **Drive: 9 plays, 42 yards, 3:26.**
- CLE – Kevin Johnson 19-yard pass from Tim Couch (Phil Dawson kick), 0:06. Chargers 13–10. **Drive: 9 plays, 70 yards, 2:05.**

**Third quarter**

- SDG – John Carney 30-yard field goal, 7:41. Chargers 16–10. **Drive: 15 plays, 52 yards, 7:19.**

**Fourth quarter**

- SDG – Jermaine Fazande 2-yard run (John Carney kick), 6:28. Chargers 23–10. **Drive: 11 plays, 57 yards, 7:15.**

**Top passers**

- CLE – Tom Couch – 18/29, 184 yards, TD, 2 INT
- SDG – Jim Harbaugh – 16/23, 161 yards

**Top rushers**

- CLE – Karim Abdul-Jabbar – 10 rushes, 29 yards
- SDG – Kenny Bynum – 17 rushes, 60 yards

**Top receivers**

- CLE – Kevin Johnson – 5 receptions, 41 yards, TD
- SDG – Jeff Graham – 5 receptions, 82 yards

==== Week 14: at Seattle Seahawks ====
Week Fourteen: San Diego Chargers at Seattle Seahawks – Game summary

Quarter	1	2	3	4	Total
**Chargers**	10	3	0	6	**19**
Seahawks	3	6	7	0	**16**

at Kingdome, Seattle, Washington

- Date: December 12
- Game time: 1:05 p.m. PST
- Game weather: None (indoor stadium)
- Game attendance: 66,318
- Referee: Walt Coleman
- TV announcers (CBS): Kevin Harlan & Sam Wyche
- Box score

Game information

**First quarter**

- SDG – Natrone Means 1-yard run (John Carney kick), 11:02. Chargers 7–0. **Drive: 10 plays, 72 yards, 3:58.**
- SEA – Todd Peterson 28-yard field goal, 6:31. Chargers 7–3. **Drive: 5 plays, 50 yards, 1:56.**
- SDG – John Carney 33-yard field goal, 1:41. Chargers 10–3. **Drive: 11 plays, 66 yards, 4:50.**

**Second quarter**

- SEA – Todd Peterson 40-yard field goal, 13:18. Chargers 10–6. **Drive: 9 plays, 54 yards, 3:23.**
- SDG – John Carney 42-yard field goal, 6:21. Chargers 13–6. **Drive: 12 plays, 60 yards, 4:13.**
- SEA – Todd Peterson 33-yard field goal, 0:24. Chargers 13–9. **Drive: 10 plays, 50 yards, 5:57.**

**Third quarter**

- SEA – Derrick Mayes 14-yard pass from Jon Kitna (Todd Peterson kick), 11:20. Seahawks 16–13. **Drive: 7 plays, 67 yards, 3:40.**

**Fourth quarter**

- SDG – John Carney 28-yard field goal, 12:04. Tied 16–16. **Drive: 10 plays, 51 yards, 3:03.**
- SDG – John Carney 41-yard field goal, 3:19. Chargers 19–16. **Drive: 4 plays, 3 yards, 2:05.**

**Top passers**

- SDG – Jim Harbaugh – 20/35, 229 yards, INT
- SEA – Jon Kitna – 25/40, 285 yards, TD, INT

**Top rushers**

- SDG – Natrone Means – 14 rushes, 42 yards, TD
- SEA – Ricky Watters – 20 rushes, 75 yards

**Top receivers**

- SDG – Jeff Graham – 9 receptions, 114 yards
- SEA – Joey Galloway – 6 receptions, 85 yards

==== Week 15: at Miami Dolphins ====
Week Fifteen: San Diego Chargers at Miami Dolphins – Game summary

Quarter	1	2	3	4	Total
Chargers	0	3	0	6	**9**
**Dolphins**	3	3	0	6	**12**

at Pro Player Stadium, Miami, Florida

- Date: December 19
- Game time: 10:00 a.m. PST / 1:00 p.m. EST
- Game weather: 81 °F (27 °C), wind 9 MPH
- Game attendance: 73,765
- Referee: Phil Luckett
- TV announcers (CBS): Kevin Harlan & Sam Wyche
- Box score

Game information

**First quarter**

- MIA – Olindo Mare 32-yard field goal, 7:19. Dolphins 3–0. **Drive: 9 plays, 45 yards, 3:35.**

**Second quarter**

- SDG – John Carney 23-yard field goal, 14:57. Tied 3–3. **Drive: 10 plays, 82 yards, 4:24.**
- MIA – Olindo Mare 21-yard field goal, 5:28. Dolphins 6–3. **Drive: 8 plays, 74 yards, 4:36.**

**Third quarter**

- No scoring plays.

**Fourth quarter**

- SDG – John Carney 22-yard field goal, 14:57. Tied 6–6. **Drive: 10 plays, 30 yards, 4:43.**
- SDG – John Carney 31-yard field goal, 10:11. Chargers 9–6. **Drive: 4 plays, -8 yards, 1:20.**
- MIA – Olindo Mare 30-yard field goal, 6:06. Tied 9–9. **Drive: 9 plays, 32 yards, 4:05.**
- MIA – Olindo Mare 31-yard field goal, 3:22. Dolphins 12–9. **Drive: 4 plays, 7 yards, 2:25.**

**Top passers**

- SDG – Jim Harbaugh – 20/40, 178 yards
- MIA – Dan Marino – 22/36, 241 yards

**Top rushers**

- SDG – Terrell Fletcher – 5 rushes, 12 yards
- MIA – Stanley Pritchett – 15 rushes, 38 yards

**Top receivers**

- SDG – Terrell Fletcher – 9 receptions, 66 yards
- MIA – Tony Martin – 8 receptions, 86 yards

==== Week 16: vs. Oakland Raiders ====
Week Sixteen: Oakland Raiders at San Diego Chargers – Game summary

Quarter	1	2	3	4	Total
Raiders	10	0	10	0	**20**
**Chargers**	0	13	0	10	**23**

at Qualcomm Stadium, San Diego, California

- Date: December 26
- Game time: 10:00 a.m. PST
- Game weather: 69 °F (21 °C), wind 9 MPH
- Game attendance: 63,846
- Referee: Jeff Triplette
- TV announcers (CBS): Don Criqui & Steve Tasker
- Box score

Game information

**First quarter**

- OAK – Joe Nedney 52-yard field goal, 8:29. Raiders 3–0. **Drive: 11 plays, 40 yards, 5:07.**
- OAK – Zack Crockett 1-yard run (Joe Nedney kick), 6:16. Raiders 10–0. **Drive: 3 plays, 33 yards, 1:52.**

**Second quarter**

- SDG – John Carney 48-yard field goal, 7:58. Raiders 10–3. **Drive: 6 plays, 36 yards, 2:56.**
- SDG – Fred McCrary 18-yard pass from Jim Harbaugh (John Carney kick), 1:53. Tied 10–10. **Drive: 6 plays, 56 yards, 2:17.**
- SDG – John Carney 19-yard field goal, 0:00. Chargers 13–10. **Drive: 4 plays, 8 yards, 0:30.**

**Third quarter**

- OAK – Rickey Dudley 7-yard pass from Rich Gannon (Joe Nedney kick), 11:22. Raiders 17–13. **Drive: 7 plays, 60 yards, 3:38.**
- OAK – Joe Nedney 25-yard field goal, 0:26. Raiders 20–13. **Drive: 12 plays, 72 yards, 6:36.**

**Fourth quarter**

- SDG – Jeff Graham 10-yard pass from Jim Harbaugh (John Carney kick), 13:18. Tied 20–20. **Drive: 6 plays, 57 yards, 2:08.**
- SDG – John Carney 37-yard field goal, 8:09. Chargers 23–20. **Drive: 7 plays, 22 yards, 3:36.**

**Top passers**

- OAK – Rich Gannon – 16/33, 266 yards, TD, INT
- SDG – Jim Harbaugh – 23/36, 325 yards, 2 TD, INT

**Top rushers**

- OAK – Rich Gannon – 3 rushes, 17 yards
- SDG – Jermaine Fazande – 14 rushes, 44 yards

**Top receivers**

- OAK – Tim Brown – 3 receptions, 109 yards
- SDG – Jeff Graham – 3 receptions, 113 yards, TD

==== Week 17: at Denver Broncos ====
Week Seventeen: San Diego Chargers at Denver Broncos – Game summary

Quarter	1	2	3	4	Total
**Chargers**	0	12	0	0	**12**
Broncos	0	0	3	3	**6**

at Mile High Stadium, Denver, Colorado

- Date: January 2, 2000
- Game time: 1:15 p.m. PST / 2:15 MST
- Game weather: 41 °F (5 °C), wind 7 MPH
- Game attendance: 69,278
- Referee: Bill Carollo
- TV announcers (CBS): Gus Johnson & Brent Jones
- Box score

Game information

**First quarter**

- No scoring plays.

**Second quarter**

- SDG – Jermaine Fazande 1-yard run (kick blocked), 11:26. Chargers 6–0. **Drive: 11 plays, 85 yards, 4:38.**
- SDG – John Carney 25-yard field goal, 6:55. Chargers 9–0. **Drive: 8 plays, 32 yards, 4:13.**
- SDG – John Carney 28-yard field goal, 0:00. Chargers 12–0. **Drive: 8 plays, 50 yards, 1:40.**

**Third quarter**

- DEN – Jason Elam 37-yard field goal, 9:00. Chargers 12–3. **Drive: 11 plays, 43 yards, 4:13.**

**Fourth quarter**

- DEN – Jason Elam 50-yard field goal, 13:57. Chargers 12–6. **Drive: 9 plays, 35 yards, 3:14.**

**Top passers**

- SDG – Jim Harbaugh – 12/19, 115 yards, 2 INT
- DEN – Brian Griese – 23/46, 211 yards

**Top rushers**

- SDG – Jermaine Fazande – 30 rushes, 183 yards, TD
- DEN – Olandis Gary – 18 rushes, 38 yards

**Top receivers**

- SDG – Jeff Graham – 6 receptions, 102 yards
- DEN – Rod Smith – 9 receptions, 106 yards

== Standings ==
AFC West
	W	L	T	PCT	PF	PA	STK
^{(3)} Seattle Seahawks	9	7	0	.563	338	298	L1
Kansas City Chiefs	9	7	0	.563	390	322	L2
San Diego Chargers	8	8	0	.500	269	316	W2
Oakland Raiders	8	8	0	.500	390	329	W1
Denver Broncos	6	10	0	.375	314	318	L1

== Awards ==
Seau was the only Charger in the AFC Pro Bowl squad, which he reached as an alternate after another play pulled out; he was named second-team All-Pro by the Associated Press. Seau also received 1 of the 44 available votes for AP NFL Defensive Player of the Year.
