= 1999 Kansas City Chiefs season =

NFL team season

- Owner: Lamar Hunt
- General manager: Carl Peterson
- Head coach: Gunther Cunningham
- Offensive coordinator: Jimmy Raye II
- Defensive coordinator: Kurt Schottenheimer
- Home stadium: Arrowhead Stadium

Results
- Record: 9–7
- Division place: 2nd AFC West
- Playoffs: Did not qualify
- All-Pros: 1: TE Tony Gonzalez (1st team)
- Pro Bowlers: 4: TE Tony Gonzalez; G Will Shields; C Tim Grunhard; CB James Hasty

The 1999 season was the Kansas City Chiefs' 30th in the National Football League (NFL) and their 40th overall. The season began with the promotion of defensive coordinator Gunther Cunningham to head coach following the resignation of Marty Schottenheimer after the Chiefs finished with a 7–9 record in 1998.

The team improved on that in 1999, finishing with a 9–7 record, which was good enough for second place in the AFC West. However, the Chiefs were denied the division title and a playoff berth in the final game of the season against the Oakland Raiders, when Raiders kicker Joe Nedney kicked a field goal in overtime. This game also was the final game future Hall of Fame linebacker Derrick Thomas played in just over a month before his death on February 8, 2000.

== Offseason ==
=== Draft ===
1999 Kansas City Chiefs draft
Round	Pick	Player	Position	College	Notes
1	14	John Tait	Offensive tackle	BYU	
2	54	Mike Cloud	Running back	Boston College	
3	75	Gary Stills *	Linebacker	West Virginia	
3	84	Larry Atkins	Defensive back	UCLA	
4	108	Larry Parker	Wide receiver	USC	
7	220	Eric King	Guard	Richmond	
Made roster * Made at least one Pro Bowl during career

=== Undrafted free agents ===
1999 undrafted free agents of note
Player	Position	College
Brandon Condie	Tight end	BYU
Ken Haslip	Defensive back	USC
Bill Lindquist	Quarterback	Benedictine

== Personnel ==
=== Staff ===
1999 Kansas City Chiefs staff
Front office: Founder – Lamar Hunt; Chairman of the Board – Jack Steadman; President/General Manager/Chief Executive Officer – Carl Peterson; Executive Vice President/Assistant General Manager – Dennis Thum; Head coaches: Head Coach – Gunther Cunningham; Assistant Head Coach/Linebackers – Dave Adolph; Offensive coaches: Offensive Coordinator – Jimmy Raye; Quarterbacks – Tom Rossley; Running Backs – Al Lavan; Wide Receivers – Richard Mann; Tight Ends – Keith Rowen; Offensive Line – Mike Solari; Offensive Assistant/Quality Control – Frank Cignetti Jr	Defensive coaches: Defensive Coordinator – Kurt Schottenheimer; Defensive Line – Bob Karmelowicz; Defensive Backs – Ron Zook; Defensive Assistant/Quality Control – Darvin Wallis; Special teams coaches: Special Teams – Mike Stock; Strength and conditioning: Strength and Conditioning – Jeff Hurd; Assistant Strength and Conditioning – Jeff Fish

=== Roster ===
1999 Kansas City Chiefs roster
Quarterbacks (QB): 15 Todd Collins; 18 Elvis Grbac; 1 Warren Moon; 7 Ted White; Running backs (RB): 30 Donnell Bennett; 34 Mike Cloud; 39 Bam Morris; 49 Tony Richardson FB; 22 Rashaan Shehee; Wide receivers (WR): 82 Derrick Alexander; 84 Joe Horn; 81 Kevin Lockett; 80 Larry Parker; 89 Andre Rison; 87 Tamarick Vanover; Tight ends (TE): 88 Tony Gonzalez; 85 Mitch Jacoby; 83 Lonnie Johnson	Offensive linemen (OL): 61 Tim Grunhard C; 62 Glenn Parker T; 66 Victor Riley T; 68 Will Shields G; 73 Jeff Smith C/G; 70 Marcus Spears T; 79 Dave Szott G; 76 John Tait T; 64 Ralph Tamm; Defensive linemen (DL): 71 Tom Barndt DT; 98 Eric Hicks DE; 75 Chester McGlockton DT; 91 Leslie O'Neal DE; 97 Ty Parten DE; 95 Derrick Ransom DT; 92 Dan Williams; 67 Mark Word DE	Linebackers (LB): 59 Donnie Edwards OLB; 55 Ron George OLB; 51 Greg Manusky MLB; 53 Marvcus Patton MLB; 57 Mike Maslowski OLB; 56 Gary Stills OLB; 58 Derrick Thomas OLB; Defensive backs (DB): 35 Larry Atkins FS; 26 Cris Dishman CB; 23 Carlton Gray CB; 40 James Hasty CB; 25 Reggie Tongue SS; 27 Bracy Walker SS; 44 Eric Warfield CB; 21 Jerome Woods FS; Special teams (ST): 12 Jon Baker K; 13 Daniel Pope P; 10 Pete Stoyanovich K	Practice squad: 74 Grant Garrett C; 31 Ray Jackson CB/S; 52 Eric King G; 48 Charles Kirby FB; 99 Lamanzer Williams DE; Reserve: 38 Kimble Anders RB (IR); 93 John Browning DE (IR); 53 active, 2 inactive, 5 practice squad Rookies in italics

== Preseason ==
Week	Date	Opponent	Result	Record	Venue	Attendance	Recap
1	August 15	Tennessee Titans	W 22–20	1–0	Arrowhead Stadium	75,152	Recap
2	August 21	Tampa Bay Buccaneers	L 7–17	1–1	Arrowhead Stadium	76,292	Recap
3	August 26	at Jacksonville Jaguars	L 6–31	1–2	Alltel Stadium	56,932	Recap
4	September 3	at San Diego Chargers	W 34–27	2–2	Qualcomm Stadium	55,555	Recap

== Regular season ==
=== Schedule ===
Week	Date	Opponent	Result	Record	Venue	Attendance	Recap
1	September 12	at Chicago Bears	**L** 17–20	0–1	Soldier Field	58,381	Recap
2	September 19	**Denver Broncos**	**W** 26–10	1–1	Arrowhead Stadium	78,683	Recap
3	September 26	Detroit Lions	**W** 31–21	2–1	Arrowhead Stadium	78,384	Recap
4	October 3	at **San Diego Chargers**	**L** 14–21	2–2	Qualcomm Stadium	58,099	Recap
5	October 10	New England Patriots	**W** 16–14	3–2	Arrowhead Stadium	78,636	Recap
6	Bye						
7	October 21	at Baltimore Ravens	**W** 35–8	4–2	PSINet Stadium	68,771	Recap
8	October 31	**San Diego Chargers**	**W** 34–0	5–2	Arrowhead Stadium	78,473	Recap
9	November 7	at Indianapolis Colts	**L** 17–25	5–3	RCA Dome	56,689	Recap
10	November 14	at Tampa Bay Buccaneers	**L** 10–17	5–4	Raymond James Stadium	64,927	Recap
11	November 21	**Seattle Seahawks**	**L** 19–31	5–5	Arrowhead Stadium	78,714	Recap
12	November 28	at **Oakland Raiders**	**W** 37–34	6–5	Network Associates Coliseum	48,632	Recap
13	December 5	at **Denver Broncos**	**W** 16–10	7–5	Mile High Stadium	73,855	Recap
14	December 12	Minnesota Vikings	**W** 31–28	8–5	Arrowhead Stadium	78,932	Recap
15	December 18	Pittsburgh Steelers	**W** 35–19	9–5	Arrowhead Stadium	78,697	Recap
16	December 26	at **Seattle Seahawks**	**L** 14–23	9–6	Kingdome	66,332	Recap
17	January 2	**Oakland Raiders**	**L** 38–41 (OT)	9–7	Arrowhead Stadium	79,026	Recap
Note: Intra-division opponents are in **bold** text.

=== Game summaries ===
==== Week 1: at Chicago Bears ====
Week 1: Kansas City Chiefs at Chicago Bears – Game summary

Quarter	1	2	3	4	Total
Chiefs	3	0	7	7	**17**
**Bears**	7	13	0	0	**20**

at Soldier Field, Chicago, Illinois

- Date: September 12
- Game time: 12:00 p.m. CDT
- Game weather: Partly cloudy, 80 °F (27 °C)
- Game attendance: 58,381
- Referee: Phil Luckett
- TV announcers (CBS): Kevin Harlan and Sam Wyche
- Recap, Game Book

Game information

**First quarter**

- KC – Pete Stoyanovich 27-yard field goal, 9:14. Chiefs 3–0. **Drive: 11 plays, 69 yards, 5:46.**
- CHI – Curtis Enis 10-yard pass from Shane Matthews (Brian Gowins kick), 4:32. Bears 7–3. **Drive: 11 plays, 61 yards, 5:42.**

**Second quarter**

- CHI – Brian Gowins 21-yard field goal, 12:45. Bears 10–3. **Drive: 6 plays, 26 yards, 2:15.**
- CHI – Brian Gowins 24-yard field goal, 3:49. Bears 13–3. **Drive: 14 plays, 74 yards, 6:01.**
- CHI – John Allred 1-yard pass from Shane Matthews (Brian Gowins kick), 0:51. Bears 20–3. **Drive: 6 plays, 63 yards, 1:27.**

**Third quarter**

- KC – Derrick Alexander 86-yard pass from Elvis Grbac (Pete Stoyanovich kick), 5:01. Bears 20–10. **Drive: 1 play, 86 yards, 0:12.**

**Fourth quarter**

- KC – Donnie Edwards 79-yard fumble return (Pete Stoyanovich kick), 12:24. Bears 20–17.

**Top passers**

- KC – Elvis Grbac – 20/42, 283 yards, TD, INT
- CHI – Shane Matthews – 25/38, 245 yards, 2 TD

**Top rushers**

- KC – Kimble Anders – 10 rushes, 39 yards
- CHI – Curtis Enis – 22 rushes, 64 yards

**Top receivers**

- KC – Derrick Alexander – 6 receptions, 154 yards, TD
- CHI – Curtis Conway – 9 receptions, 88 yards

==== Week 2: vs. Denver Broncos ====
Week 2: Denver Broncos at Kansas City Chiefs – Game summary

Quarter	1	2	3	4	Total
Broncos	0	3	0	7	**10**
**Chiefs**	0	6	10	10	**26**

at Arrowhead Stadium, Kansas City, Missouri

- Date: September 19
- Game time: 3:15 p.m. CDT
- Game weather: Mostly cloudy, 69 °F (21 °C)
- Game attendance: 78,683
- Referee: Tony Corrente
- TV announcers (CBS): Greg Gumbel, Phil Simms and Bonnie Bernstein
- Recap, Game Book

Game information

**First quarter**

- No scoring plays.

**Second quarter**

- DEN – Jason Elam 50-yard field goal, 11:34. Broncos 3–0. **Drive: 9 plays, 24 yards, 4:34.**
- KC – Pete Stoyanovich 19-yard field goal, 2:54. Tied 3–3. **Drive: 10 plays, 55 yards, 5:13.**
- KC – Pete Stoyanovich 42-yard field goal, 0:00. Chiefs 6–3. **Drive: 9 plays, 46 yards, 1:14.**

**Third quarter**

- KC – Tony Richardson 1-yard run (Pete Stoyanovich kick), 9:16. Chiefs 13–3. **Drive: 5 plays, 55 yards, 2:45.**
- KC – Pete Stoyanovich 44-yard field goal, 6:14. Chiefs 16–3. **Drive: 4 plays, 1 yard, 2:09.**

**Fourth quarter**

- DEN – Terrell Davis 1-yard run (Jason Elam kick), 14:58. Chiefs 16–10. **Drive: 4 plays, 34 yards, 1:40.**
- KC – Bam Morris 5-yard run (Pete Stoyanovich kick), 9:25. Chiefs 23–10. **Drive: 9 plays, 66 yards, 5:33.**
- KC – Pete Stoyanovich 27-yard field goal, 2:14. Chiefs 26–10. **Drive: 8 plays, 80 yards, 3:37.**

**Top passers**

- DEN – Brian Griese – 11/16, 107 yards, INT
- KC – Elvis Grbac – 15/20, 179 yards, INT

**Top rushers**

- DEN – Terrell Davis – 21 rushes, 79 yards, TD
- KC – Kimble Anders – 22 rushes, 142 yards

**Top receivers**

- DEN – Shannon Sharpe – 6 receptions, 52 yards
- KC – Derrick Alexander – 6 receptions, 117 yards

==== Week 3: vs. Detroit Lions ====
Week 3: Detroit Lions at Kansas City Chiefs – Game summary

Quarter	1	2	3	4	Total
Lions	0	7	6	8	**21**
**Chiefs**	7	10	7	7	**31**

at Arrowhead Stadium, Kansas City, Missouri

- Date: September 26
- Game time: 12:00 p.m. CDT
- Game weather: Partly cloudy, 74 °F (23 °C)
- Game attendance: 78,384
- Referee: Mike Carey
- TV announcers (Fox): Ray Bentley, Ron Pitts and Jennifer Hammond
- Recap, Game Book

Game information

**First quarter**

- KC – Tony Gonzalez 15-yard pass from Elvis Grbac (Pete Stoyanovich kick), 1:30. Chiefs 7–0. **Drive: 4 plays, 55 yards, 2:00.**

**Second quarter**

- DET – Sedrick Irvin 16-yard run (Jason Hanson kick), 9:14. Tied 7–7. **Drive: 4 plays, 73 yards, 2:43.**
- KC – Rashaan Shehee 5-yard run (Pete Stoyanovich kick), 4:18. Chiefs 14–7. **Drive: 4 plays, 63 yards, 1:49.**
- KC – Pete Stoyanovich 51-yard field goal, 0:01. Chiefs 17–7. **Drive: 10 plays, 57 yards, 1:47.**

**Third quarter**

- KC – Joe Horn 25-yard pass from Elvis Grbac (Pete Stoyanovich kick), 5:00. Chiefs 24–7. **Drive: 4 plays, 48 yards, 1:52.**
- DET – Walter Rasby 3-yard pass from Charlie Batch (pass failed), 1:24. Chiefs 24–13. **Drive: 7 plays, 75 yards, 3:36.**

**Fourth quarter**

- KC – Donnell Bennett 1-yard run (Pete Stoyanovich kick), 10:38. Chiefs 31–13. **Drive: 4 plays, 23 yards, 1:26.**
- DET – Ron Rivers 31-yard pass from Charlie Batch (Charlie Batch–Brian Stablein pass), 2:11. Chiefs 31–21. **Drive: 4 plays, 44 yards, 0:45.**

**Top passers**

- DET – Charlie Batch – 16/34, 213 yards, 2 TD, 2 INT
- KC – Elvis Grbac – 20/29, 235 yards, 2 TD

**Top rushers**

- DET – Ron Rivers – 13 rushes, 66 yards
- KC – Donnell Bennett – 12 rushes, 73 yards, TD

**Top receivers**

- DET – Germane Crowell – 2 receptions, 48 yards
- KC – Tony Gonzalez – 7 receptions, 72 yards, TD

==== Week 4: at San Diego Chargers ====
Week 4: Kansas City Chiefs at San Diego Chargers – Game summary

Quarter	1	2	3	4	Total
Chiefs	14	0	0	0	**14**
**Chargers**	0	14	7	0	**21**

at Qualcomm Stadium, San Diego, California

- Date: October 3
- Game time: 3:15 p.m. CDT/1:15 p.m. PDT
- Game weather: Sunny, 76 °F (24 °C)
- Game attendance: 58,099
- Referee: Ed Hochuli
- TV announcers (CBS): Don Criqui and Steve Tasker
- Recap, Game Book

Game information

**First quarter**

- KC – Joe Horn 31-yard pass from Elvis Grbac (Pete Stoyanovich kick), 9:42. Chiefs 7–0. **Drive: 2 plays, 42 yards, 0:48.**
- KC – Tony Gonzalez 12-yard pass from Elvis Grbac (Pete Stoyanovich kick), 1:40. Chiefs 14–0. **Drive: 4 plays, 23 yards, 1:57.**

**Second quarter**

- SD – Natrone Means 4-yard run (John Carney kick), 7:20. Chiefs 14–7. **Drive: 2 plays, 10 yards, 0:43.**
- SD – Kenny Bynum 18-yard pass from Erik Kramer (John Carney kick), 1:41. Tied 14–14. **Drive: 2 plays, 18 yards, 0:11.**

**Third quarter**

- SD – Chris Penn 11-yard pass from Erik Kramer (John Carney kick), 10:57. Chargers 21–14. **Drive: 3 plays, 22 yards, 1:19.**

**Fourth quarter**

- No scoring plays.

**Top passers**

- KC – Elvis Grbac – 19/40, 200 yards, 2 TD, 4 INT
- SD – Erik Kramer – 8/20, 72 yards, 2 TD, INT

**Top rushers**

- KC – Rashaan Shehee – 22 rushes, 86 yards
- SD – Natrone Means – 14 rushes, 26 yards, TD

**Top receivers**

- KC – Tony Gonzalez – 7 receptions, 68 yards, TD
- SD – Freddie Jones – 4 receptions, 48 yards

==== Week 5: vs. New England Patriots ====
Week 5: New England Patriots at Kansas City Chiefs – Game summary

Quarter	1	2	3	4	Total
Patriots	7	0	0	7	**14**
**Chiefs**	3	0	10	3	**16**

at Arrowhead Stadium, Kansas City, Missouri

- Date: October 10
- Game time: 12:00 p.m. CDT
- Game weather: Clear and sunny, 73 °F (23 °C)
- Game attendance: 78,636
- Referee: Bob McElwee
- TV announcers (CBS): Ian Eagle and Mark May
- Recap, Game Book

Game information

**First quarter**

- KC – Pete Stoyanovich 22-yard field goal, 6:02. Chiefs 3–0. **Drive: 4 plays, 2 yards, 2:07.**
- NE – Terry Glenn 49-yard pass from Drew Bledsoe (Adam Vinatieri kick), 1:57. Patriots 7–3. **Drive: 8 plays, 78 yards, 4:05.**

**Second quarter**

- No scoring plays.

**Third quarter**

- KC – Donnell Bennett 1-yard run (Pete Stoyanovich kick), 6:54. Chiefs 10–7. **Drive: 14 plays, 76 yards, 8:06.**
- KC – Pete Stoyanovich 41-yard field goal, 4:52. Chiefs 13–7. **Drive: 9 plays, 38 yards, 4:20.**

**Fourth quarter**

- KC – Pete Stoyanovich 23-yard field goal, 4:52. Chiefs 16–7. **Drive: 14 plays, 63 yards, 8:05.**
- NE – Shawn Jefferson 8-yard pass from Drew Bledsoe (Adam Vinatieri kick), 2:43. Chiefs 16–14. **Drive: 8 plays, 77 yards, 2:09.**

**Top passers**

- NE – Drew Bledsoe – 23/45, 334 yards, 2 TD, 2 INT
- KC – Elvis Grbac – 18/26, 198 yards, INT

**Top rushers**

- NE – Terry Allen – 11 rushes, 53 yards
- KC – Donnell Bennett – 15 rushes, 52 yards, TD

**Top receivers**

- NE – Tony Simmons – 7 receptions, 107 yards
- KC – Joe Horn – 4 receptions, 75 yards

==== Week 7: at Baltimore Ravens ====
Week 7: Kansas City Chiefs at Baltimore Ravens – Game summary

Quarter	1	2	3	4	Total
**Chiefs**	0	7	7	21	**35**
Ravens	0	0	0	8	**8**

at PSINet Stadium, Baltimore, Maryland

- Date: October 21
- Game time: 8:20 p.m. EDT/7:20 p.m. CDT
- Game weather: Clear, light winds, 55 °F (13 °C)
- Game attendance: 68,771
- Referee: Johnny Grier
- TV announcers (ESPN): Mike Patrick, Joe Theismann, Paul Maguire and Solomon Wilcots
- Recap, Game Book

Game information

**First quarter**

- No scoring plays.

**Second quarter**

- KC – Tony Gonzalez 11-yard pass from Elvis Grbac (Pete Stoyanovich kick), 12:01. Chiefs 7–0. **Drive: 9 plays, 73 yards, 4:15.**

**Third quarter**

- KC – James Hasty 56-yard interception return (Pete Stoyanovich kick), 5:10. Chiefs 14–0.

**Fourth quarter**

- KC – Tony Gonzalez 22-yard pass from Elvis Grbac (Pete Stoyanovich kick), 12:37. Chiefs 21–0. **Drive: 8 plays, 57 yards, 3:33.**
- KC – Reggie Tongue 38-yard interception return (Pete Stoyanovich kick), 10:35. Chiefs 28–0.
- BAL – Errict Rhett 2-yard run (Chuck Evans run), 4:05. Chiefs 28–8. **Drive: 5 plays, 56 yards, 2:04.**
- KC – Bam Morris 1-yard run (Pete Stoyanovich kick), 2:30. Chiefs 35–8. **Drive: 3 plays, 32 yards, 1:55.**

**Top passers**

- KC – Elvis Grbac – 9/16, 112 yards, 2 TD
- BAL – Stoney Case – 15/37, 103 yards, 3 INT

**Top rushers**

- KC – Bam Morris – 16 rushes, 70 yards, TD
- BAL – Errict Rhett – 19 rushes, 59 yards, TD

**Top receivers**

- KC – Tony Gonzalez – 4 receptions, 54 yards, 2 TD
- BAL – Justin Armour – 6 receptions, 70 yards

==== Week 8: vs. San Diego Chargers ====
Week 8: San Diego Chargers at Kansas City Chiefs – Game summary

Quarter	1	2	3	4	Total
Chargers	0	0	0	0	**0**
**Chiefs**	10	10	14	0	**34**

at Arrowhead Stadium, Kansas City, Missouri

- Date: October 31
- Game time: 12:00 p.m. CST
- Game weather: Mostly sunny, 65 °F (18 °C)
- Game attendance: 78,473
- Referee: Phil Luckett
- TV announcers (CBS): Verne Lundquist, Dan Dierdorf and Bonnie Bernstein
- Recap, Game Book

Game information

**First quarter**

- KC – Pete Stoyanovich 43-yard field goal, 10:11. Chiefs 3–0. **Drive: 4 plays, −9 yards, 1:30.**
- KC – Reggie Tongue 7-yard fumble return (Pete Stoyanovich kick), 7:50. Chiefs 10–0.

**Second quarter**

- KC – Pete Stoyanovich 39-yard field goal, 9:59. Chiefs 13–0. **Drive: 12 plays, 42 yards, 6:38.**
- KC – Joe Horn 9-yard pass from Elvis Grbac (Pete Stoyanovich kick), 2:35. Chiefs 20–0. **Drive: 8 plays, 77 yards, 4:19.**

**Third quarter**

- KC – Derrick Alexander 81-yard pass from Elvis Grbac (Pete Stoyanovich kick), 3:27. Chiefs 27–0. **Drive: 3 plays, 88 yards, 1:24.**
- KC – Donnell Bennett 7-yard run (Pete Stoyanovich kick), 2:58. Chiefs 34–0. **Drive: 2 plays, 7 yards, 0:11.**

**Fourth quarter**

- No scoring plays.

**Top passers**

- SD – Jim Harbaugh – 18/34, 174 yards, INT
- KC – Elvis Grbac – 11/15, 194 yards, 2 TD

**Top rushers**

- SD – Kenny Bynum – 12 rushes, 55 yards
- KC – Donnell Bennett – 14 rushes, 38 yards, TD

**Top receivers**

- SD – Freddie Jones – 4 receptions, 57 yards
- KC – Derrick Alexander – 2 receptions, 113 yards, TD

==== Week 9: at Indianapolis Colts ====
Week 9: Kansas City Chiefs at Indianapolis Colts – Game summary

Quarter	1	2	3	4	Total
Chiefs	3	7	7	0	**17**
**Colts**	3	10	3	9	**25**

at RCA Dome, Indianapolis, Indiana

- Date: November 7
- Game time: 12:00 p.m. CST
- Game weather: None (indoor stadium)
- Game attendance: 56,689
- Referee: Bernie Kukar
- TV announcers (CBS): Verne Lundquist, Dan Dierdorf and Bonnie Bernstein
- Recap, Game Book

Game information

**First quarter**

- IND – Mike Vanderjagt 47-yard field goal, 6:58. Colts 3–0. **Drive: 5 plays, 17 yards, 1:55.**
- KC – Pete Stoyanovich 38-yard field goal, 10:11. Tied 3–3. **Drive: 12 plays, 50 yards, 6:42.**

**Second quarter**

- IND – Mike Vanderjagt 34-yard field goal, 12:42. Colts 6–3. **Drive: 7 plays, 41 yards, 2:31.**
- KC – Donnell Bennett 23-yard run (Pete Stoyanovich kick), 8:51. Chiefs 10–6. **Drive: 8 plays, 70 yards, 3:51.**
- IND – Edgerrin James 30-yard pass from Peyton Manning (Mike Vanderjagt kick), 5:45. Colts 13–10. **Drive: 5 plays, 66 yards, 3:06.**

**Third quarter**

- KC – Kevin Lockett 18-yard pass from Elvis Grbac (Pete Stoyanovich kick), 8:57. Chiefs 17–13. **Drive: 11 plays, 88 yards, 6:03.**
- IND – Mike Vanderjagt 29-yard field goal, 4:00. Chiefs 17–16. **Drive: 8 plays, 52 yards, 4:57.**

**Fourth quarter**

- IND – Peyton Manning 7-yard run (pass failed), 10:49. Colts 22–17. **Drive: 6 plays, 54 yards, 3:04.**
- IND – Mike Vanderjagt 37-yard field goal, 1:10. Colts 25–17. **Drive: 6 plays, 27 yards, 2:22.**

**Top passers**

- KC – Elvis Grbac – 18/31, 196 yards, TD
- IND – Peyton Manning – 21/33, 290 yards, TD, INT

**Top rushers**

- KC – Donnell Bennett – 12 rushes, 64 yards, TD
- IND – Edgerrin James – 20 rushes, 109 yards

**Top receivers**

- KC – Kevin Lockett – 3 receptions, 54 yards, TD
- IND – Marvin Harrison – 7 receptions, 93 yards

==== Week 10: at Tampa Bay Buccaneers ====
Week 10: Kansas City Chiefs at Tampa Bay Buccaneers – Game summary

Quarter	1	2	3	4	Total
Chiefs	3	0	0	7	**10**
**Buccaneers**	0	10	7	0	**17**

at Raymond James Stadium, Tampa, Florida

- Date: November 14
- Game time: 1:00 p.m. EST/12:00 p.m. CST
- Game weather: Clear, mild, light winds, 76 °F (24 °C)
- Game attendance: 64,927
- Referee: Ron Winter
- TV announcers (CBS): Kevin Harlan and Sam Wyche
- Recap, Game Book

Game information

**First quarter**

- KC – Pete Stoyanovich 20-yard field goal, 11:59. Chiefs 3–0. **Drive: 5 plays, 27 yards, 1:59.**

**Second quarter**

- TB – Dave Moore 35-yard pass from Trent Dilfer (Martín Gramática kick), 8:49. Buccaneers 7–3. **Drive: 2 plays, 53 yards, 0:52.**
- TB – Martín Gramática 25-yard field goal, 0:28. Buccaneers 10–3. **Drive: 4 plays, 6 yards, 0:28.**

**Third quarter**

- TB – Jacquez Green 52-yard pass from Trent Dilfer (Martín Gramática kick), 2:38. Buccaneers 17–3. **Drive: 5 plays, 73 yards, 2:17.**

**Fourth quarter**

- KC – Joe Horn 50-yard pass from Elvis Grbac (Pete Stoyanovich kick), 10:40. Buccaneers 17–10. **Drive: 3 plays, 59 yards, 1:59.**

**Top passers**

- KC – Elvis Grbac – 23/38, 202 yards, TD, INT
- TB – Trent Dilfer – 17/27, 270 yards, 2 TD, INT

**Top rushers**

- KC – Rashaan Shehee – 10 rushes, 54 yards
- TB – Warrick Dunn – 18 rushes, 66 yards

**Top receivers**

- KC – Joe Horn – 3 receptions, 63 yards, TD
- TB – Jacquez Green – 7 receptions, 164 yards, TD

==== Week 11: vs. Seattle Seahawks ====
Week 11: Seattle Seahawks at Kansas City Chiefs – Game summary

Quarter	1	2	3	4	Total
**Seahawks**	0	14	10	7	**31**
Chiefs	3	10	0	6	**19**

at Arrowhead Stadium, Kansas City, Missouri

- Date: November 21
- Game time: 12:00 p.m. CST
- Game weather: Fair, 60 °F (16 °C)
- Game attendance: 78,714
- Referee: Jeff Triplette
- TV announcers (CBS): Kevin Harlan and Sam Wyche
- Recap, Game Book

Game information

**First quarter**

- KC – Pete Stoyanovich 29-yard field goal, 6:07. Chiefs 3–0. **Drive: 13 plays, 71 yards, 6:40.**

**Second quarter**

- SEA – Ricky Watters 2-yard run (Todd Peterson kick), 10:19. Seahawks 7–3. **Drive: 13 plays, 92 yards, 5:45.**
- KC – Donnell Bennett 1-yard run (Pete Stoyanovich kick), 5:03. Chiefs 10–7. **Drive: 11 plays, 71 yards, 5:46.**
- SEA – Ricky Watters 22-yard pass from Jon Kitna (Todd Peterson kick), 1:46. Seahawks 14–10. **Drive: 9 plays, 75 yards, 3:17.**
- KC – Pete Stoyanovich 29-yard field goal, 0:02. Seahawks 14–13. **Drive: 12 plays, 43 yards, 1:21.**

**Third quarter**

- SEA – Todd Peterson 38-yard field goal, 9:17. Seahawks 17–13. **Drive: 10 plays, 45 yards, 3:08.**
- SEA – Sean Dawkins 45-yard pass from Jon Kitna (Todd Peterson kick), 3:13. Seahawks 24–13. **Drive: 2 plays, 42 yards, 0:48.**

**Fourth quarter**

- KC – Donnell Bennett 4-yard run (pass failed), 6:49. Seahawks 24–19. **Drive: 8 plays, 59 yards, 3:38.**
- SEA – Ricky Watters 5-yard run (Todd Peterson kick), 2:43. Seahawks 31–19. **Drive: 5 plays, 58 yards, 1:28.**

**Top passers**

- SEA – Jon Kitna – 14/33, 245 yards, 2 TD, INT
- KC – Elvis Grbac – 30/49, 320 yards, INT

**Top rushers**

- SEA – Ricky Watters – 24 rushes, 107 yards, 2 TD
- KC – Donnell Bennett – 17 rushes, 60 yards, 2 TD

**Top receivers**

- SEA – Sean Dawkins – 5 receptions, 114 yards, TD
- KC – Derrick Alexander – 8 receptions, 101 yards

==== Week 12: at Oakland Raiders ====
Week 12: Kansas City Chiefs at Oakland Raiders – Game summary

Quarter	1	2	3	4	Total
**Chiefs**	0	10	10	17	**37**
Raiders	3	10	21	0	**34**

at Network Associates Coliseum, Oakland, California

- Date: November 28
- Game time: 3:15 p.m. CST/1:15 p.m. PST
- Game weather: Sunny, 55 °F (13 °C)
- Game attendance: 48,632
- Referee: Gerry Austin
- TV announcers (CBS): Ian Eagle and Mark May
- Recap, Game Book

Game information

**First quarter**

- OAK – Michael Husted 33-yard field goal, 4:09. Raiders 3–0. **Drive: 7 plays, 41 yards, 2:53.**

**Second quarter**

- KC – Donnell Bennett 1-yard run (Pete Stoyanovich kick), 12:30. Chiefs 7–3. **Drive: 6 plays, 52 yards, 2:39.**
- OAK – Michael Husted 30-yard field goal, 8:38. Chiefs 7–6. **Drive: 8 plays, 50 yards, 3:52.**
- KC – Pete Stoyanovich 47-yard field goal, 4:51. Chiefs 10–6. **Drive: 8 plays, 31 yards, 3:47.**
- OAK – Rickey Dudley 16-yard pass from Rich Gannon (Michael Husted kick), 1:19. Raiders 13–10. **Drive: 8 plays, 73 yards, 3:52.**

**Third quarter**

- KC – Pete Stoyanovich 37-yard field goal, 10:20. Tied 13–13. **Drive: 9 plays, 31 yards, 3:42.**
- KC – Cris Dishman 47-yard interception return (Pete Stoyanovich kick), 8:56. Chiefs 20–13.
- OAK – Rich Gannon 6-yard run (Michael Husted kick), 5:15. Tied 20–20. **Drive: 6 plays, 40 yards, 3:41.**
- OAK – Rickey Dudley 3-yard pass from Rich Gannon (Michael Husted kick), 4:06. Raiders 27–20. **Drive: 1 play, 3 yards, 0:06.**
- OAK – Charles Woodson 15-yard interception return (Michael Husted kick), 0:03. Raiders 34–20.

**Fourth quarter**

- KC – Tony Gonzalez 73-yard pass from Elvis Grbac (Pete Stoyanovich kick), 13:38. Raiders 34–27. **Drive: 3 plays, 82 yards, 1:35.**
- KC – Cris Dishman 40-yard interception return (Pete Stoyanovich kick), 2:43. Tied 34–34.
- KC – Pete Stoyanovich 44-yard field goal, 0:00. Chiefs 37–34. **Drive: 9 plays, 39 yards, 2:56.**

**Top passers**

- KC – Elvis Grbac – 18/27, 226 yards, TD, 2 INT
- OAK – Rich Gannon – 19/29, 232 yards, 2 TD, 2 INT

**Top rushers**

- KC – Mike Cloud – 11 rushes, 58 yards
- OAK – Tyrone Wheatley – 11 rushes, 48 yards

**Top receivers**

- KC – Tony Gonzalez – 3 receptions, 90 yards, TD
- OAK – Tim Brown – 5 receptions, 83 yards

==== Week 13: at Denver Broncos ====
Week 13: Kansas City Chiefs at Denver Broncos – Game summary

Quarter	1	2	3	4	Total
**Chiefs**	0	10	0	6	**16**
Broncos	3	7	0	0	**10**

at Mile High Stadium, Denver, Colorado

- Date: December 5
- Game time: 3:15 p.m. CST/2:15 p.m. MST
- Game weather: Sunny, 45 °F (7 °C)
- Game attendance: 73,855
- Referee: Ron Blum
- TV announcers (CBS): Ian Eagle and Mark May
- Recap, Game Book

Game information

**First quarter**

- DEN – Jason Elam 39-yard field goal, 8:28. Broncos 3–0. **Drive: 6 plays, 60 yards, 3:33.**

**Second quarter**

- KC – Tony Gonzalez 10-yard pass from Elvis Grbac (Pete Stoyanovich kick), 10:15. Chiefs 7–3. **Drive: 7 plays, 43 yards, 3:05.**
- DEN – Olandis Gary 3-yard run (Jason Elam kick), 2:11. Broncos 10–7. **Drive: 5 plays, 41 yards, 2:10.**
- KC – Pete Stoyanovich 43-yard field goal, 0:36. Tied 10–10. **Drive: 10 plays, 61 yards, 1:35.**

**Third quarter**

- No scoring plays.

**Fourth quarter**

- KC – Tamarick Vanover 80-yard punt return (pass failed), 4:53. Chiefs 16–10.

**Top passers**

- KC – Elvis Grbac – 20/34, 183 yards, TD, INT
- DEN – Brian Griese – 20/36, 227 yards, INT

**Top rushers**

- KC – Tony Richardson – 12 rushes, 80 yards
- DEN – Olandis Gary – 14 rushes, 61 yards, TD

**Top receivers**

- KC – Joe Horn – 2 receptions, 36 yards
- DEN – Rod Smith – 8 receptions, 106 yards

==== Week 14: vs. Minnesota Vikings ====
Week 14: Minnesota Vikings at Kansas City Chiefs – Game summary

Quarter	1	2	3	4	Total
Vikings	0	14	7	7	**28**
**Chiefs**	14	7	0	10	**31**

at Arrowhead Stadium, Kansas City, Missouri

- Date: December 12
- Game time: 7:20 p.m. CST
- Game weather: Mostly cloudy and dark, 41 °F (5 °C)
- Game attendance: 78,932
- Referee: Dick Hantak
- TV announcers (ESPN): Mike Patrick, Joe Theismann, Paul Maguire and Solomon Wilcots
- Recap, Game Book

Game information

**First quarter**

- KC – Donnell Bennett 2-yard run (Pete Stoyanovich kick), 8:42. Chiefs 7–0. **Drive: 9 plays, 47 yards, 4:44.**
- KC – Tony Gonzalez 13-yard pass from Elvis Grbac (Pete Stoyanovich kick), 3:09. Chiefs 14–0. **Drive: 6 plays, 62 yards, 3:02.**

**Second quarter**

- KC – Tony Gonzalez 9-yard pass from Elvis Grbac (Pete Stoyanovich kick), 13:29. Chiefs 21–0. **Drive: 4 plays, 53 yards, 2:49.**
- MIN – Robert Tate 76-yard kickoff return (Gary Anderson kick), 13:01. Chiefs 21–7.
- MIN – Matthew Hatchette 8-yard pass from Jeff George (Gary Anderson kick), 0:40. Chiefs 21–14. **Drive: 6 plays, 62 yards, 2:25.**

**Third quarter**

- MIN – Randy Moss 12-yard pass from Jeff George (Gary Anderson kick), 4:34. Tied 21–21. **Drive: 14 plays, 74 yards, 6:33.**

**Fourth quarter**

- KC – Eric Hicks 44-yard fumble return (Pete Stoyanovich kick), 8:01. Chiefs 28–21.
- MIN – Randy Moss 64-yard punt return (Gary Anderson kick), 1:38. Tied 28–28.
- KC – Pete Stoyanovich 38-yard field goal, 0:03. Chiefs 31–28. **Drive: 10 plays, 48 yards, 1:35.**

**Top passers**

- MIN – Jeff George – 13/23, 190 yards, 2 TD
- KC – Elvis Grbac – 19/29, 215 yards, 2 TD

**Top rushers**

- MIN – Robert Smith – 21 rushes, 118 yards
- KC – Tony Richardson – 11 rushes, 57 yards

**Top receivers**

- MIN – Randy Moss – 5 receptions, 76 yards, TD
- KC – Joe Horn – 4 receptions, 65 yards

==== Week 15: vs. Pittsburgh Steelers ====
Week 15: Pittsburgh Steelers at Kansas City Chiefs – Game summary

Quarter	1	2	3	4	Total
Steelers	10	3	0	6	**19**
**Chiefs**	7	14	7	7	**35**

at Arrowhead Stadium, Kansas City, Missouri

- Date: December 18
- Game time: 11:30 a.m. CST
- Game weather: Overcast, 29 °F (−2 °C)
- Game attendance: 78,697
- Referee: Larry Nemmers
- TV announcers (CBS): Verne Lundquist, Dan Dierdorf and Bonnie Bernstein
- Recap, Game Book

Game information

**First quarter**

- PIT – Troy Edwards 12-yard pass from Mike Tomczak (Kris Brown, 11:10. Steelers 7–0. **Drive: 7 plays, 63 yards, 3:50.**
- KC – Tony Gonzalez 13-yard pass from Elvis Grbac (Pete Stoyanovich kick), 8:43. Tied 7–7. **Drive: 5 plays, 64 yards, 2:27.**
- PIT – Kris Brown 42-yard field goal, 5:07. Steelers 10–7. **Drive: 7 plays, 28 yards, 3:36.**

**Second quarter**

- KC – Donnie Edwards 28-yard interception return (Pete Stoyanovich kick), 10:16. Chiefs 14–10.
- KC – Tony Gonzalez 4-yard pass from Elvis Grbac (Pete Stoyanovich kick), 4:17. Chiefs 21–10. **Drive: 9 plays, 62 yards, 4:43.**
- PIT – Kris Brown 47-yard field goal, 0:03. Chiefs 21–13. **Drive: 10 plays, 37 yards, 4:14.**

**Third quarter**

- KC – Derrick Alexander 82-yard run (Pete Stoyanovich kick), 1:29. Chiefs 28–13. **Drive: 2 plays, 91 yards, 0:59.**

**Fourth quarter**

- KC – Bam Morris 10-yard run (Pete Stoyanovich kick), 1:56. Chiefs 35–13. **Drive: 6 plays, 50 yards, 2:37.**
- PIT – Bobby Shaw 11-yard pass from Mike Tomczak (pass failed), 0:34. Chiefs 35–19. **Drive: 5 plays, 58 yards, 1:22.**

**Top passers**

- PIT – Mike Tomczak – 23/46, 278 yards, 2 TD, 4 INT
- KC – Elvis Grbac – 12/22, 149 yards, 2 TD

**Top rushers**

- PIT – Jerome Bettis – 19 rushes, 63 yards
- KC – Derrick Alexander – 1 rush, 82 yards, TD

**Top receivers**

- PIT – Bobby Shaw – 3 receptions, 69 yards, TD
- KC – Tony Gonzalez – 6 receptions, 93 yards, 2 TD

==== Week 16: at Seattle Seahawks ====
Week 16: Kansas City Chiefs at Seattle Seahawks – Game summary

Quarter	1	2	3	4	Total
Chiefs	0	7	7	0	**14**
**Seahawks**	10	7	6	0	**23**

at Kingdome, Seattle, Washington

- Date: December 26
- Game time: 3:05 p.m. CST/1:05 p.m. PST
- Game weather: None (indoor stadium)
- Game attendance: 66,332
- Referee: Bill Carollo
- TV announcers (CBS): Ian Eagle and Mark May
- Recap, Game Book

Game information

**First quarter**

- SEA – Todd Peterson 31-yard field goal, 9:18. Seahawks 3–0. **Drive: 9 plays, 64 yards, 5:42.**
- SEA – Sean Dawkins 20-yard pass from Jon Kitna (Todd Peterson kick), 2:39. Seahawks 10–0. **Drive: 2 plays, 35 yards, 0:29.**

**Second quarter**

- SEA – Derrick Mayes 9-yard pass from Jon Kitna (Todd Peterson kick), 6:23. Seahawks 17–0. **Drive: 6 plays, 48 yards, 2:54.**
- KC – Lonnie Johnson 4-yard pass from Elvis Grbac (Pete Stoyanovich kick), 1:14. Seahawks 17–7. **Drive: 11 plays, 71 yards, 5:09.**

**Third quarter**

- SEA – Todd Peterson 22-yard field goal, 9:35. Seahawks 20–7. **Drive: 5 plays, 2 yards, 1:55.**
- KC – Joe Horn 76-yard pass from Elvis Grbac (Pete Stoyanovich kick), 8:08. Seahawks 20–14. **Drive: 3 plays, 77 yards, 1:27.**
- SEA – Todd Peterson 48-yard field goal, 4:39. Seahawks 23–14. **Drive: 7 plays, 39 yards, 3:29.**

**Fourth quarter**

- No scoring plays.

**Top passers**

- KC – Elvis Grbac – 22/42, 253 yards, 2 TD, 3 INT
- SEA – Jon Kitna – 18/30, 216 yards, 2 TD

**Top rushers**

- KC – Bam Morris – 6 rushes, 33 yards
- SEA – Ricky Watters – 18 rushes, 63 yards

**Top receivers**

- KC – Joe Horn – 3 receptions, 92 yards, TD
- SEA – Christian Fauria – 6 receptions, 84 yards

==== Week 17: vs. Oakland Raiders ====
Week 17: Oakland Raiders at Kansas City Chiefs – Game summary

Quarter	1	2	3	4	OT	Total
**Raiders**	7	21	7	3	3	**41**
Chiefs	17	7	7	7	0	**38**

at Arrowhead Stadium, Kansas City, Missouri

- Date: January 2
- Game time: 12:00 p.m. CDT
- Game weather: Clear, 43 °F (6 °C)
- Game attendance: 79,026
- Referee: Walt Coleman
- TV announcers (CBS): Ian Eagle and Mark May
- Recap, Game Book

Game information

**First quarter**

- KC – Tamarick Vanover 84-yard punt return (Pete Stoyanovich kick), 13:03. Chiefs 7–0.
- KC – James Hasty 34-yard interception return (Pete Stoyanovich kick), 12:46. Chiefs 14–0.
- KC – Pete Stoyanovich 33-yard field goal, 7:31. Chiefs 17–0. **Drive: 8 plays, 46 yards, 3:25.**
- OAK – Kenny Shedd 20-yard return of blocked punt (Joe Nedney kick), 2:49. Chiefs 17–7.

**Second quarter**

- OAK – Zack Crockett 12-yard pass from Rich Gannon (Joe Nedney kick), 8:34. Chiefs 17–14. **Drive: 9 plays, 54 yards, 4:45.**
- OAK – Napoleon Kaufman 22-yard pass from Rich Gannon (Joe Nedney kick), 3:09. Raiders 21–17. **Drive: 9 plays, 52 yards, 2:33.**
- KC – Tony Gonzalez 7-yard pass from Elvis Grbac (Pete Stoyanovich kick), 0:54. Chiefs 24–21. **Drive: 12 plays, 86 yards, 2:15.**
- OAK – Tyrone Wheatley 23-yard pass from Rich Gannon (Joe Nedney kick), 0:13. Raiders 28–24. **Drive: 4 plays, 60 yards, 0:41.**

**Third quarter**

- KC – Joe Horn 27-yard pass from Elvis Grbac (Pete Stoyanovich kick), 3:04. Chiefs 31–28. **Drive: 13 plays, 98 yards, 6:23.**
- OAK – Tyrone Wheatley 26-yard run (Joe Nedney kick), 2:03. Raiders 35–31. **Drive: 2 plays, 68 yards, 1:01.**

**Fourth quarter**

- KC – Kevin Lockett 39-yard pass from Elvis Grbac (Pete Stoyanovich kick), 7:22. Chiefs 38–35. **Drive: 2 plays, 40 yards, 0:39.**
- OAK – Joe Nedney 38-yard field goal, 0:45. Tied 38–38. **Drive: 11 plays, 40 yards, 2:01.**

**Overtime**

- OAK – Joe Nedney 35-yard field goal, 11:47. Raiders 41–38. **Drive: 8 plays, 45 yards, 3:13.**

**Top passers**

- OAK – Rich Gannon – 25/47, 324 yards, 3 TD, 2 INT
- KC – Elvis Grbac – 20/39, 243 yards, 3 TD

**Top rushers**

- OAK – Tyrone Wheatley – 17 rushes, 86 yards, TD
- KC – Donnell Bennett – 20 rushes, 84 yards

**Top receivers**

- OAK – Tim Brown – 6 receptions, 122 yards
- KC – Kevin Lockett – 3 receptions, 69 yards, TD

This marked the second and ultimately final time the Seahawks won the AFC West; they would move to the NFC West prior to the 2002 season.

== Standings ==
AFC West
	W	L	T	PCT	PF	PA	STK
^{(3)} Seattle Seahawks	9	7	0	.563	338	298	L1
Kansas City Chiefs	9	7	0	.563	390	322	L2
San Diego Chargers	8	8	0	.500	269	316	W2
Oakland Raiders	8	8	0	.500	390	329	W1
Denver Broncos	6	10	0	.375	314	318	L1
