= 1999 Denver Broncos season =

American football team season

- Owner: Pat Bowlen
- General manager: Neal Dahlen and Mike Shanahan
- President: Pat Bowlen
- Head coach: Mike Shanahan
- Offensive coordinator: Gary Kubiak
- Defensive coordinator: Greg Robinson
- Home stadium: Mile High Stadium

Results
- Record: 6–10
- Division place: 5th AFC West
- Playoffs: Did not qualify
- Pro Bowlers: C Tom Nalen; FB Detron Smith; DT Trevor Pryce

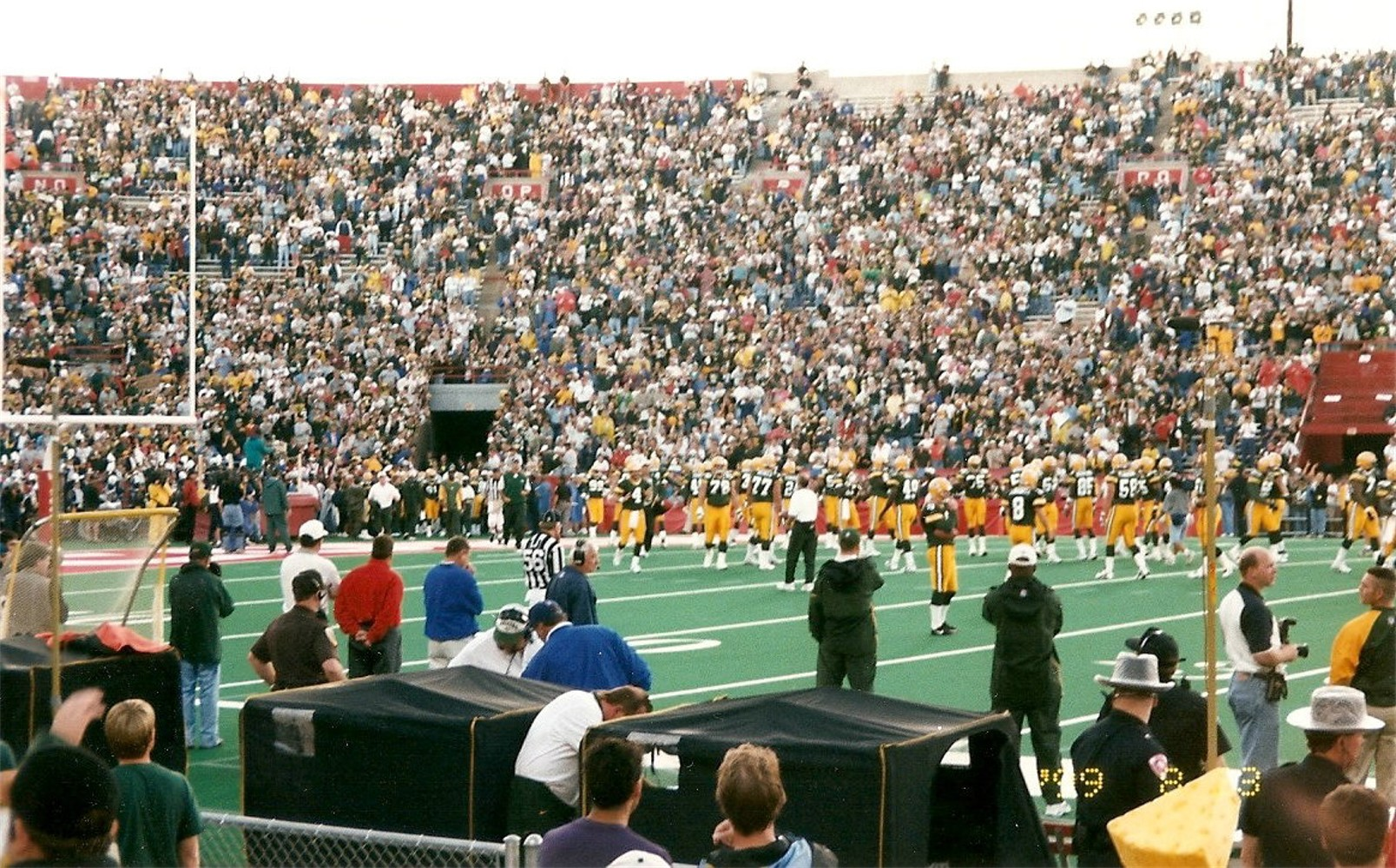
Denver visits the Green Bay Packers in preseason at Camp Randall Stadium, August 23

The 1999 season was the Denver Broncos' 30th in the National Football League (NFL) and their 40th overall. The 1999 Broncos were hoping to win a third consecutive Super Bowl, but after winning a second against the Atlanta Falcons in Super Bowl XXXIII in Miami, the team suffered the retirement of Super Bowl XXXIII MVP quarterback John Elway during the off-season. Elway had spent his entire career with the Broncos, and much of the focus in the weeks leading up to the season centered on the void left by Elway's departure. Head coach Mike Shanahan announced that third-round 1998 draft pick Brian Griese, son of Miami Dolphins quarterback Bob Griese, would take the reins of the offense, passing over veteran and credible back-up quarterback Bubby Brister.

In the preseason, the Broncos played in the first NFL game held in Australia. On August 7, before a crowd of 73,811 spectators at Stadium Australia in Sydney, the Broncos defeated the San Diego Chargers 20–17.

Although no one expected a serious defense of their title, the Broncos would stumble out of the gate this season, losing the first four regular season games. Many of the games would be decided in the final two minutes of play, but the Broncos found themselves on the losing end at 6–10. It was their first losing season since 1994, their worst season since 1990 and the worst record of the five-team AFC West. Until the injury plagued 2022 Rams, this was the worst ever season for a team defending their Super Bowl title in a non-strike season. Only the 1982 San Francisco 49ers had a lower winning percentage as they failed to defend their first Super Bowl championship.

The Broncos and the Atlanta Falcons combined for an 11–21 record in 1999. This is, as of 2022, the worst combined record for both defending conference and/or Super Bowl champions in the season following a Super Bowl appearance. The 11-21 mark was matched by the Tampa Bay Buccaneers and Oakland Raiders four years later, one season removed from Super Bowl XXXVII.

Statistics site Football Outsiders calculates that the Broncos went from the league's third-easiest schedule in 1998, to the hardest schedule in 1999:

Before 2011, the worst one-year increase in strength of schedule belonged to the 1999 Broncos. Denver had ridden the third-easiest schedule (in a 30-team league) to a Lombardi Trophy in 1998, only to fall apart the next season under the weight of John Elway's retirement, Terrell Davis'[s] Week 4 injury, and – oh, by the way – the toughest schedule in the league.

This was the largest single-season change in Football Outsiders' rankings until the 2011 St. Louis Rams.

Week 4 saw star running back Terrell Davis, who was last year's league MVP, hurt his knee and was placed on injured reserve for the remainder of the season.

== Offseason ==
=== NFL draft ===
1999 Denver Broncos draft
Round	Pick	Player	Position	College	Notes
1	31	Al Wilson *	Linebacker	Tennessee	
2	58	Montae Reagor	Defensive tackle	Texas Tech	from San Francisco (Note: No. 58: San Francisco → Denver (PD). San Francisco traded its second-round selection (58th) to Denver in exchange for offensive tackle Jamie Brown in 1998.)
2	61	Lennie Friedman *	Guard	Duke	
3	67	Chris Watson	Cornerback	Eastern Illinois	from Carolina (Note: No. 67: Carolina → Denver (PD). Carolina traded its third-round selection (67th), as well as its fourth-round selection in 2000 (112th), to Denver in exchange for quarterback Jeff Lewis.)
3	93	Travis McGriff	Wide receiver	Florida	
4	127	Olandis Gary	Running back	Georgia	
5	158	David Bowens	Defensive end	Western Illinois	from Dallas (Note: No. 158: Dallas → Denver (PD). Dallas traded its fifth-round selection (158th) to Denver in exchange for tight end Kendell Watkins in 1998.)
5	167	Darwin Brown	Defensive back	Texas Tech	
6	179	Desmond Clark *	Tight end	Wake Forest	from New Orleans via Washington (Note: No. 179: multiple trades: No. 179: New Orleans → Washington (D). see No. 5: Washington → New Orleans. No. 179: Washington → Denver (D). see No. 165: Denver → Washington.)
6	204	Chad Plummer	Wide receiver	Cincinnati	
7	218	Billy Miller	Tight end	USC	from New Orleans via Washington (Note: No. 218: multiple trades: No. 218: New Orleans → Washington (D). see No. 5: Washington → New Orleans. No. 218: Washington → Denver (D). see No. 165: Denver → Washington.)
7	238	Justin Swift	Tight end	Kansas State	
Made roster * Made at least one Pro Bowl during career

== Personnel ==
=== Staff ===
1999 Denver Broncos staff
Front office: President and chief executive officer – Pat Bowlen; Vice-president of business operations – Joe Ellis; Vice-president of administration – John Beake; General manager – Neal Dahlen; Director of pro scouting – Jack Elway; Director of college scouting – Ted Sundquist; College scouting consultant – Jerry Frei; Head coaches: Head coach/vice president of football operations – Mike Shanahan; Assistant head coach/offensive line – Alex Gibbs; Offensive coaches: Offensive coordinator/quarterbacks – Gary Kubiak; Running backs – Bobby Turner; Wide receivers – Mike Heimerdinger; Tight ends – Brian Pariani; Assistant offensive line/Assistant Strength and Conditioning – Barney Chavous; Offensive assistant – Pat McPherson	Defensive coaches: Defensive coordinator – Greg Robinson; Defensive line – George Dyer; Linebackers – Frank Bush; Defensive backs – Ed Donatell; Defensive assistant – Rick Smith; Defensive assistant – Terry Tumey; Pass rush specialist – John Teerlinck; Special teams coaches: Special teams – Rick Dennison; Strength and conditioning: Strength and conditioning – Rich Tuten; Assistant strength and conditioning – Ricky Porter; Assistant strength and conditioning – Greg Saporta

=== Roster ===
1999 Denver Broncos roster
Quarterbacks (QB): 6 Bubby Brister; 11 Jeff Brohm; 14 Brian Griese; 12 Chris Miller; Running backs (RB): 33 John Avery KR; 22 Olandis Gary; 29 Howard Griffith FB; 31 Derek Loville; 37 Anthony Lynn FB; 42 Detron Smith FB; Wide receivers (WR): 81 Andre Cooper; 85 Chris Doering; 87 Ed McCaffrey; 83 Travis McGriff PR; 80 Rod Smith; Tight ends (TE): 89 Dwayne Carswell; 86 Byron Chamberlain; 88 Desmond Clark; 82 Billy Miller	Offensive linemen (OL): 79 Chris Banks G; 60 K. C. Jones C; 78 Matt Lepsis T; 66 Tom Nalen C; 62 Dan Neil G; 69 Mark Schlereth G; 70 Trey Teague; 71 Melvin Tuten T; Defensive linemen (DL): 73 Cyron Brown DE; 95 Paul Grasmanis DT; 96 Harald Hasselbach DE; 97 Mike Lodish DT; 93 Trevor Pryce DT; 99 Montae Reagor DE/DT; 90 Neil Smith DE; 94 Keith Traylor NT; 98 Maa Tanuvasa DE	Linebackers (LB): 52 David Bowens OLB; 59 Glenn Cadrez; 53 Bill Romanowski OLB; 58 Steve Russ OLB; 54 Nate Wayne OLB; 56 Al Wilson MLB; Defensive backs (DB): 34 Tyrone Braxton SS; 40 Dale Carter CB; 48 George Coghill FS; 39 Ray Crockett CB; 20 Tory James CB; 25 Darrius Johnson CB/S; 23 Jason Moore SS; 35 Jason Suttle CB; 21 Chris Watson CB/KR; Special teams (ST): 1 Jason Elam K; 16 Tom Rouen P	Practice squad: 74 Jeremy Akers G; 75 Glenn Rountree G; 36 Brad Trout S; 57 Jason Watts C; Reserve: 26 Eric Brown S (IR); 30 Terrell Davis RB (IR); 64 Lennie Friedman G (IR); 49 Chris Gizzi LB (Military); 77 Tony Jones T (IR); 38 Tori Noel S (IR); 84 Shannon Sharpe TE (IR); 51 John Mobley LB (IR); 50 Artie Ulmer LB (IR); 91 Alfred Williams DE (IR); 53 active, 10 inactive, 4 practice squad Rookies in italics

== Schedule ==
Week	Date	Opponent	Result	Record	Venue	Attendance
1	September 13	Miami Dolphins	**L** 21–38	0–1	Mile High Stadium	75,623
2	September 19	at **Kansas City Chiefs**	**L** 10–26	0–2	Arrowhead Stadium	78,683
3	September 26	at Tampa Bay Buccaneers	**L** 10–13	0–3	Raymond James Stadium	65,297
4	October 3	New York Jets	**L** 13–21	0–4	Mile High Stadium	74,181
5	October 10	at **Oakland Raiders**	**W** 16–13	1–4	Network Associates Coliseum	55,704
6	October 17	Green Bay Packers	**W** 31–10	2–4	Mile High Stadium	73,352
7	October 24	at New England Patriots	**L** 23–24	2–5	Foxboro Stadium	60,011
8	October 31	Minnesota Vikings	**L** 20–23	2–6	Mile High Stadium	75,021
9	November 7	at **San Diego Chargers**	**W** 33–17	3–6	Qualcomm Stadium	61,204
10	November 14	at **Seattle Seahawks**	**L** 17–20	3–7	Kingdome	66,314
11	November 22	**Oakland Raiders**	**W** 27–21 (OT)	4–7	Mile High Stadium	70,012
12	Bye					
13	December 5	**Kansas City Chiefs**	**L** 10–16	4–8	Mile High Stadium	73,855
14	December 13	at Jacksonville Jaguars	**L** 24–27	4–9	Alltel Stadium	71,357
15	December 19	**Seattle Seahawks**	**W** 36–30 (OT)	5–9	Mile High Stadium	65,987
16	December 25	at Detroit Lions	**W** 17–7	6–9	Pontiac Silverdome	73,158
17	January 2	**San Diego Chargers**	**L** 6–12	6–10	Mile High Stadium	69,278
Note: Intra-division opponents are in **bold** text.

== Standings ==
AFC West
	W	L	T	PCT	PF	PA	STK
^{(3)} Seattle Seahawks	9	7	0	.563	338	298	L1
Kansas City Chiefs	9	7	0	.563	390	322	L2
San Diego Chargers	8	8	0	.500	269	316	W2
Oakland Raiders	8	8	0	.500	390	329	W1
Denver Broncos	6	10	0	.375	314	318	L1
