= Eric Hicks (American football) =

American football player and coach (born 1976)

No. 98
- Position: Defensive end

Personal information
- Born: June 17, 1976 (age 50); Erie, Pennsylvania, U.S.
- Listed height: 6 ft 6 in (1.98 m)
- Listed weight: 280 lb (127 kg)

Career information
- College: Maryland
- NFL draft: 1998: undrafted

Career history

Playing
- Kansas City Chiefs (1998–2006); New York Jets (2007); Detroit Lions (2009)*
- * Offseason or practice squad member only

Coaching
- Blue Valley Southwest HS (KS) (2010–2011) Defensive line coach; Lamar (2012–2014) Outside linebackers coach; Brooklyn Bolts (2015) Defensive line coach; Avila (2016) Defensive line coach; Avila (2017) Head coach; Avila (2018–2019) Defensive line coach; TSL Aviators (2020) Defensive coordinator

Career NFL statistics
- Tackles: 341
- Sacks: 44.5
- Forced fumbles: 6
- Stats at Pro Football Reference

Eric David Hicks (born June 17, 1976) is an American former professional football player who was a defensive end in the National Football League (NFL). He was signed by the Kansas City Chiefs as an undrafted free agent in 1998. He played college football for the Maryland Terrapins.

Hicks was also a member of the New York Jets and the Detroit Lions.

== Early life ==
Hicks attended Mercyhurst Preparatory School in Erie, Pennsylvania from 1991 to 1994 after transferring there before his sophomore year. As a senior, he posted 6.0 sacks, and 68 tackles. He was also named First-team All-Metro. In 2006, he received the Distinguished Alumni Award.

== College career ==
Hicks attended the University of Maryland, College Park, majoring in criminology and criminal justice, where he finished his career with 9.5 sacks, 147 tackles (26 for losses), three forced fumbles, two fumble recoveries, and three pass deflections.

== Professional career ==
=== Kansas City Chiefs ===
Hicks was an undrafted free agent in 1998 when he made the Kansas City Chiefs opening day roster, the only rookie free agent to make the club's opening day roster that year. He started 90 of the 96 games he has played in. He ranks fifth in franchise history with 40.5 career sacks. He recorded a career high 14.0 sacks in just 11 starts during the 2000 campaign, becoming just the fourth Kansas City Chiefs player to ever reach the 14.0-sack mark. He accumulated four tackles (three solo) in his lone postseason start in 2003. Hicks saw a decline in production in 2006, as he only registered two solo tackles and five assisted tackles in 16 games. He signed to a six-year contract in 2004 but became a salary cap casualty before the 2007 season and was cut in May 2007.

=== New York Jets ===
Hicks was signed by the New York Jets for the 2007 season, appearing in 11 games while recording 17 tackles and no sacks. On December 18, 2007, he was released by the Jets.

=== Detroit Lions ===
After spending the 2008 season out of football, Hicks was signed by the Detroit Lions on May 4, 2009. He was released on July 30, 2009.

== NFL career statistics ==
Legend
**Bold**	Career high

=== Regular season ===
Year	Team	Games		Tackles				Interceptions				Fumbles			
Year	Team	GP	GS	Comb	Solo	Ast	Sck	Int	Yds	TD	Lng	FF	FR	Yds	TD
1998	KAN	3	0	0	0	0	0.0	0	0	0	0	0	1	0	0
1999	KAN	16	16	38	28	10	4.0	0	0	0	0	1	**2**	**44**	**1**
2000	KAN	13	11	46	37	9	**14.0**	0	0	0	0	0	1	0	0
2001	KAN	16	16	54	**45**	9	3.5	0	0	0	0	**3**	1	0	0
2002	KAN	16	15	**55**	41	**14**	9.0	0	0	0	0	0	1	0	0
2003	KAN	16	16	49	37	12	5.0	0	0	0	0	0	0	0	0
2004	KAN	16	16	31	25	6	5.0	0	0	0	0	0	0	0	0
2005	KAN	16	14	44	36	8	4.0	0	0	0	0	2	0	0	0
2006	KAN	16	0	7	2	5	0.0	0	0	0	0	0	0	0	0
2007	NYJ	11	0	17	10	7	0.0	0	0	0	0	0	0	0	0
		139	104	341	261	80	44.5	0	0	0	0	6	6	44	1

=== Playoffs ===
Year	Team	Games		Tackles				Interceptions				Fumbles			
Year	Team	GP	GS	Comb	Solo	Ast	Sck	Int	Yds	TD	Lng	FF	FR	Yds	TD
2003	KAN	1	1	**3**	**2**	**1**	0.0	0	0	0	0	0	0	0	0
2006	KAN	1	0	0	0	0	0.0	0	0	0	0	0	0	0	0
		2	1	3	2	1	0.0	0	0	0	0	0	0	0	0

== Personal life ==
Hicks was born to Cheryl Vaughn and Augustas Hicks. He has two sisters and two brothers.

== Head coaching record ==
Year	Team	Overall	Conference	Standing	Bowl/playoffs
**Avila Eagles** (Heart of America Athletic Conference) (2017)
2017	Avila	3–8	1–4	T–5th (South)	
Avila:		3–8	1–4		
Total:		3–8			
