= Jeff Lewis (American football) =

American football player (1973–2013)

No. 8, 10
- Position: Quarterback

Personal information
- Born: April 17, 1973; Columbus, Ohio, U.S.
- Died: January 5, 2013 (aged 39); Phoenix, Arizona, U.S.
- Listed height: 6 ft 2 in (1.88 m)
- Listed weight: 211 lb (96 kg)

Career information
- High school: Horizon (Phoenix)
- College: Northern Arizona
- NFL draft: 1996: 4th round, 100th overall pick

Career history
- Denver Broncos (1996–1998); Carolina Panthers (1999–2000); New Orleans Saints (2002)*; Colorado Crush (2003)
- * Offseason or practice squad member only

Awards and highlights
- 2× Super Bowl champion (XXXII, XXXIII); Division I-AA third-team All-American (1994); Second-team All-Big Sky (1994)

Career NFL statistics
- Passing yards: 210
- TD–INT: 0–2
- Passer rating: 46.1
- Stats at Pro Football Reference

Career AFL statistics
- Passing yards: 344
- TD–INT: 7–3
- Stats at ArenaFan.com

Jeffrey Scott Lewis (April 17, 1973 – January 5, 2013) was an American professional football player who was a quarterback in the National Football League (NFL) for the Denver Broncos and Carolina Panthers. He played college football for the Northern Arizona Lumberjacks.

== Early life ==
Lewis attended Horizon High School where he was an All-conference and All-city selection in football, baseball and basketball. He gained over 1,000 rushing yards in his last 2 seasons in football. As a senior in baseball, he batted for a .492 average and tallied a 3–1 record as a pitcher.

== College career ==
He accepted a scholarship from Northern Arizona University, where he became a four-year starter at quarterback (41 straight starts) and a three-time team captain. After being redshirted in 1991, he finished his college career with 785 completions of 1,315 passes for 9,655 yards and 67 touchdowns. At the time he was second on the school's all-time list in passing yards (9,655), completions (785), attempts (1,316), pass completion percentage (59.7) and touchdowns (67). He also set the NCAA Division I-AA career record for interception avoidance (1.82).

In 2003, he was inducted into the Northern Arizona Athletics Hall of Fame.

== Professional career ==
=== Denver Broncos ===
Lewis was selected by the Denver Broncos in the fourth round (100th overall) of the 1996 NFL draft. As a rookie, he was the third-string quarterback. The next year, he was named the backup behind John Elway and was seen as the heir apparent to the future hall of famer.

In 1998, he was lost for the season after tearing his left anterior cruciate ligament while playing a pickup basketball game and made matters worse by hiding how he suffered the injury.

He fell out of favor with head coach Mike Shanahan and was traded to the Carolina Panthers, in exchange for a 1999 third round (#67-Chris Watson) and a 2000 fourth round draft choice (#112-Cooper Carlisle) on March 1, 1999.

=== Carolina Panthers ===
The Carolina Panthers acquired Lewis in 1999, because new head coach George Seifert saw potential in Lewis' athletic ability and wanted to eventually replace starter Steve Beuerlein.

In 2001, Lewis was named the starter after Beuerlein was released. He had a bad preseason, including a game where he threw three interceptions in four attempts, which eventually led to him be released on August 31. Rookie Chris Weinke was given the starter job and proceeded to go 1-15 during the regular season.

=== New Orleans Saints ===
On February 19, 2002, he signed as a free agent with the New Orleans Saints. He was released on August 19.

=== Colorado Crush ===
On January 30, 2003, he was signed by the Colorado Crush of the Arena Football League. He was promoted to the active roster on April 4.

== Personal life ==
Lewis died on January 5, 2013, at his home in Phoenix, Arizona. An autopsy revealed the cause of death was an accidental drug overdose caused by a mix of morphine and zolpidem (Ambien). At the time of his death, he was the wide receivers coach at Northern Arizona, after serving at Louisville as an offensive administrative assistant from 2007 to 2008 and wide receivers coach in 2009. He had one son, Elijah Jaymes.
