= Reggie Tongue =

American football player (born 1973)

No. 41, 25, 29
- Position: Safety

Personal information
- Born: April 11, 1973 (age 53); Baltimore, Maryland, U.S.
- Listed height: 6 ft 0 in (1.83 m)
- Listed weight: 204 lb (93 kg)

Career information
- High school: Lathrop (Fairbanks, Alaska)
- College: Oregon State
- NFL draft: 1996: 2nd round, 58th overall pick

Career history
- Kansas City Chiefs (1996–1999); Seattle Seahawks (2000–2003); New York Jets (2004); Oakland Raiders (2005)

Awards and highlights
- First-team All-Pac-10 (1995); Second-team All-Pac-10 (1994)

Career NFL statistics
- Total tackles: 676
- Sacks: 9.5
- Forced fumbles: 12
- Interceptions: 15
- Defensive touchdowns: 4
- Stats at Pro Football Reference

Reginald Clinton Tongue (born April 11, 1973) is an American former professional football player who was a safety in the National Football League (NFL). He played college football for the Oregon State Beavers.

== Early life ==
Tongue attended Lathrop High School in Fairbanks, Alaska. As a senior for Lathrop, Tongue played running back/defensive back and rushed for 932 yards and 12 scores. On defense, he had 11 interceptions. He was named 1990 Alaska football player of the year and signed a letter of intent to play RB for Oregon State University.

== College career ==
Tongue attended Oregon State University, where he played for the Beavers. Originally recruited as a running back, Tongue was redshirted his freshman year, during his sophomore year, due to injuries in the defensive backfield Tongue moved to cornerback and eventually to free safety his junior year. During his tenure, Reggie tied a pac-10 record with 4 interceptions returned for touchdowns. He finished at OSU with 9 interceptions, 362 tackles and was named to the 2nd team all-pac-10 team in 1994 and the 1st team in 1995.

== Professional career ==
Tongue was selected in the second round (58th overall) in the 1996 NFL draft by the Kansas City Chiefs. He would play there for 4 seasons, until being picked up by the Seattle Seahawks for the 2000 season, where he played until 2003. In 2004 he played for the New York Jets and completed his career in 2005 with the Oakland Raiders.

== NFL career statistics ==
Year	Team	Games		Tackles				Interceptions					Fumbles			
Year	Team	G	GS	Comb	Solo	Ast	Sack	Int	Yds	Lng	TD	PD	FF	FR	Yds	TD
1996	KC	16	0	4	4	0	0.0	—	—	—	0	—	0	—	—	—
1997	KC	16	16	88	67	21	2.5	1	0	0	0	—	2	0	0	0
1998	KC	15	15	98	78	20	2.0	—	—	—	0	—	1	1	0	0
1999	KC	16	16	94	83	11	2.0	1	80	46	1	9	5	3	9	1
2000	SEA	16	6	57	43	14	0.0	0	0	0	0	5	1	—	—	—
2001	SEA	16	16	81	61	20	1.0	3	67	55	1	7	0	2	23	0
2002	SEA	16	16	105	77	28	0.0	5	118	46	1	10	0	2	11	0
2003	SEA	14	14	71	57	14	2.0	4	11	10	0	8	2	1	0	0
2004	NYJ	16	16	72	55	17	0.0	1	23	23	0	5	1	1	0	0
2005	OAK	4	1	6	6	0	0.0	—	—	—	0	—	0	—	—	—
Career		145	116	676	531	145	9.5	15	299	55	3	44	12	10	43	1
