= Natrone Means =

American football player and coach (born 1972)

North Carolina Tar Heels
- Title: Running backs coach

Personal information
- Born: April 26, 1972 (age 54); Harrisburg, North Carolina, U.S.
- Listed height: 5 ft 10 in (1.78 m)
- Listed weight: 245 lb (111 kg)

Career information
- High school: Central Cabarrus (Concord, North Carolina)
- College: North Carolina (1990–1992)
- NFL draft: 1993: 2nd round, 41st overall pick

Career history

Playing
- San Diego Chargers (1993–1995); Jacksonville Jaguars (1996–1997); San Diego Chargers (1998–1999); Carolina Panthers (2000)

Coaching
- Livingstone (2005) Running backs coach; Livingstone (2006) Offensive coordinator / running backs coach; West Charlotte HS (NC) (2007–2008) Offensive coordinator / running backs coach; Winston Salem State (2014–2017) Running backs coach; Winston Salem State (2018–2019) Assistant head coach / offensive coordinator; Fayetteville State (2020) Assistant head coach / offensive coordinator; North Carolina (2021–2024) Offensive analyst; North Carolina (2025–present) Running backs coach

Awards and highlights
- Pro Bowl (1994); San Diego Chargers 50th Anniversary Team; 2× First-team All-ACC (1991, 1992)

Career NFL statistics
- Rushing yards: 5,215
- Rushing average: 3.7
- Rushing touchdowns: 45
- Stats at Pro Football Reference

Natrone Jermaine Means (born April 26, 1972) is an American former professional football player who was a running back in the National Football League (NFL) for the San Diego Chargers, Jacksonville Jaguars, and Carolina Panthers from 1993 to 2000.

Means played college football for the North Carolina Tar Heels. He was selected by the Chargers in the second round (41st overall) of the 1993 NFL draft. In 1994, he was selected for the Pro Bowl during San Diego's Super Bowl season. He is a member of the San Diego Chargers 50th Anniversary Team.

Means was nicknamed Natrone "Refried" Means and, later, "Natrone Means Business" by ESPN's Chris Berman. He is currently an assistant coach for the Tar Heels.

== Early life and high school career ==
Means' love for football began by watching his older brother one season at football practice. He then started playing Pee Wee football at age 7.

Means attended Central Cabarrus High School in Concord, North Carolina in Cabarrus County. He started on the junior varsity football team for the Central Cabarrus Vikings as a freshman in 1986. After only seven games, he was promoted to the varsity team his freshman season. As a sophomore, he played on the varsity team as a running back and cornerback. His first two touches that season were 60-plus yard touchdown scores. He went on to have standout junior and senior seasons. As a senior, he ran for more than 2,300 yards and 33 touchdowns while playing in the second half of games only twice during the regular season. During high school, Means was recruited by several large universities including the University of North Carolina at Chapel Hill, the University of South Carolina, Florida State University, and the University of Tennessee.

== College career ==
Means attended the University of North Carolina at Chapel Hill and finished his career with 605 rushing attempts of 3,074 yards (5.1 yards per rushing attempt avg.), and 34 touchdowns, and hauled in 61 receptions of 500 yards (8.19 yards per rec. avg.). He rushed for more than 1,000 yards as both a sophomore and junior.

- 1990: 168 carries for 849 yards with 10 TD. 24 catches for 229 yards with 1 TD.
- 1991: 201 carries for 1,030 yards with 11 TD. 23 catches for 178 yards.
- 1992: 236 carries for 1,195 yards with 13 TD. 14 catches for 93 yards.

== Professional career ==
Pre-draft measurables
Height	Weight	Arm length	Hand span	Bench press
5 ft 10 3/8 in (1.79 m)	255 lb (116 kg)	31 7/8 in (0.81 m)	9 1/8 in (0.23 m)	18 reps

Means played from 1993 to 1995 for the Chargers, and was a Pro Bowl selection in 1994 after leading his team to Super Bowl XXIX going up against the San Francisco 49ers, only to lose 49–26. Scoring a touchdown in the Super Bowl, he broke William Perry's record for the youngest player to score a touchdown in the Super Bowl at age 22. This was eventually broken by 21-year-old Jamal Lewis in Super Bowl XXXV. He was waived by San Diego before the 1996 season and signed with the Jaguars. Means returned to San Diego as an unrestricted free agent in 1998, but left as a free agent for the Panthers in 2000. He retired at the end of the season in 2000.

Means was named in the San Diego Chargers 50th Anniversary Team in 2009. He was a finalist in 2012 to be inducted into the Chargers Hall of Fame.

== NFL career statistics ==
Rushing statistics

Year	Team	GP	Att	Yards	Avg	Lng	TD	FD	Fum	Lost
1993	SD	16	160	645	4.0	65	8	48	1	1
1994	SD	16	343	1,350	3.9	25	12	79	5	4
1995	SD	10	186	730	3.9	36	5	39	2	2
1996	JAX	14	152	507	3.3	35	2	27	3	1
1997	JAX	14	244	823	3.4	20	9	43	4	3
1998	SD	10	212	883	4.2	72	5	42	1	1
1999	SD	7	112	277	2.5	15	4	16	0	0
Career		87	1,409	5,215	3.7	72	45	294	16	12

Receiving statistics

Year	Team	GP	Rec	Yards	Avg	Lng	TD	FD	Fum	Lost
1993	SD	16	10	59	5.9	11	0	3	0	0
1994	SD	16	39	235	6.0	22	0	9	0	0
1995	SD	10	7	46	6.6	14	0	1	0	0
1996	JAX	14	7	45	6.4	11	1	2	0	0
1997	JAX	14	15	104	6.9	21	0	3	1	0
1998	SD	10	16	91	5.7	22	0	3	1	1
1999	SD	7	9	51	5.7	12	1	2	0	0
Career		87	103	631	6.1	22	2	23	2	1

== Coaching career ==
In 2005, Means joined the staff of Livingstone College in Salisbury, North Carolina as running backs coach and in 2006 was promoted to offensive coordinator. He was recruited by head coach Robert Massey, who played with Means on the Jacksonville Jaguars in 1996. Means honed his coaching skills while participating in the NFL Minority Coaching Fellowship Program during the summer months of 2003 and 2006 with the Atlanta Falcons.

In 2007, Means was the offensive coordinator at the historical powerhouse West Charlotte High School in Charlotte, North Carolina. During training camp for the 2008 season, Means again participated in the NFL Minority Coaching Fellowship Program, working with the running backs of the Carolina Panthers.

In May 2014, Means became running backs coach at Winston-Salem State University. He was the associate head coach and offensive coordinator at Winston-Salem State.

In March 2021, Means became an offensive analyst at North Carolina.

In January 2025, Means was promoted to running backs coach at North Carolina.

== Bibliography ==
- Wilner, Barry (January 22, 1995), "The Natrone Bomb", The Sunday Courier (The Associated Press), pp. 4B
