= Tremayne Stephens =

American football player (born 1976)

No. 34
- Position: Running back

Personal information
- Born: April 16, 1976 (age 50); Greer, South Carolina, U.S.

Career information
- High school: Riverside (Greer)
- College: NC State
- NFL draft: 1998: undrafted

Career history
- 1998: San Diego Chargers
- 1999: Indianapolis Colts
- 1999: San Diego Chargers
- 2000: Indianapolis Colts*
- * Offseason or practice squad member only

Awards and highlights
- First-team All-ACC (1997); Second-team All-ACC (1994)
- Stats at Pro Football Reference

Tremayne Stephens (born April 16, 1976) is an American former professional football player who was a running back in the National Football League (NFL) for two seasons with the San Diego Chargers and one season for the Indianapolis Colts. He was selected as a free agent in 1998 to San Diego after playing college football for the NC State Wolfpack. He amassed 3,558 yards rushing and 23 touchdowns, which both still rank third in school history. He had his first start his rookie season against the Oakland Raiders where he finished with 17 carries for 74 yards. He was selected as an AFC Alternate Kickoff Returner in 1998 when he averaged 27.9 yards per kickoff return.
