= Chris Watson (American football) =

American football player (born 1977)

No. 21
- Position: Cornerback

Personal information
- Born: June 30, 1977 (age 49); Chicago, Illinois, U.S.
- Listed height: 6 ft 1 in (1.85 m)
- Listed weight: 188 lb (85 kg)

Career information
- High school: Leo (Chicago)
- College: Eastern Illinois
- NFL draft: 1999: 3rd round, 67th overall pick

Career history
- Denver Broncos (1999); Buffalo Bills (2000–2002); Detroit Lions (2003); Green Bay Packers (2004)*
- * Offseason or practice squad member only

Career NFL statistics
- Tackles: 69
- Interceptions: 2
- Pass deflections: 11
- Punt/Kick returns: 174
- Stats at Pro Football Reference

Chris Watson (born June 30, 1977) is an American former professional football player who was a cornerback in the National Football League (NFL). He played for the Denver Broncos, Buffalo Bills, and Detroit Lions.

== Early life ==
Chris attended Leo Catholic High School in Chicago, part of the Chicago Catholic League.

== College ==
Watson attended Eastern Illinois University as a student and a football standout. In football, he was a four-year letterman and a three-year starter.

== Professional career ==
Watson was selected 67th overall in the third round by the Denver Broncos of the 1999 NFL draft, then the highest an Eastern Illinois player had ever been drafted. Head coach and fellow alumnus Mike Shanahan was so impressed by Watson's performance in the pre-season, he released both veteran return specialists and made Watson the starter. In his rookie season, Watson returned 48 kickoffs, and 44 punts including an 81-yard touchdown against Seattle in Week 15 (then the 5th longest in franchise history), but also fumbled 5 times and was traded to Buffalo. He was the Bills' primary return specialist in 2000, but he disappointed greatly in that role to the point where Bills head coach Wade Phillips dismissively called Watson "more of a punt catcher" at one point in the 2000 season. Phillips's successor Gregg Williams used Watson almost exclusively as cornerback in 2001 and 2002. He was traded to the Lions before the 2003 season, but never appeared in a game.

As of 2017's NFL off-season, Watson shared the Broncos franchise record for kick returns in a season (48) with Chris Cole.
