= Kenny Bynum =

American football player (born 1974)

No. 43, 30
- Position: Running back

Personal information
- Born: May 29, 1974 (age 52); Gainesville, Florida, U.S.
- Listed height: 5 ft 11 in (1.80 m)
- Listed weight: 191 lb (87 kg)

Career information
- High school: Gainesville
- College: South Carolina State (1993–1996)
- NFL draft: 1997: 5th round, 138th overall pick

Career history
- San Diego Chargers (1997–2000); → Rhein Fire (1999)

Career NFL statistics
- Rushing yards: 433
- Rushing average: 3.1
- Receptions: 24
- Receiving yards: 253
- Total touchdowns: 3
- Stats at Pro Football Reference

Kenneth Bernard Bynum (born May 29, 1974) is an American former professional football player who was a running back for the San Diego Chargers of the National Football League (NFL) from 1997 to 2000. He played college football for the South Carolina State Bulldogs and was selected by the Chargers in the fifth round of the 1997 NFL draft with the 138th overall pick. In 1997, he played in 13 games, rushed 30 times for 97 yards and scored no touchdowns. In 1998, he played in 10 games and had 11 rushing attempts for 23 yards and 4 receptions for 27 yards. In 1998, he played in 16 games and had 92 rushing attempts for 287 yards and a touchdown to go along with 16 receptions for 209 yards and two touchdowns. In 2000, he played in 11 games and had only 7 rushing attempts for 26 yards and 2 receptions for 13 yards.
