= Donnell Bennett =

American football player (born 1972)

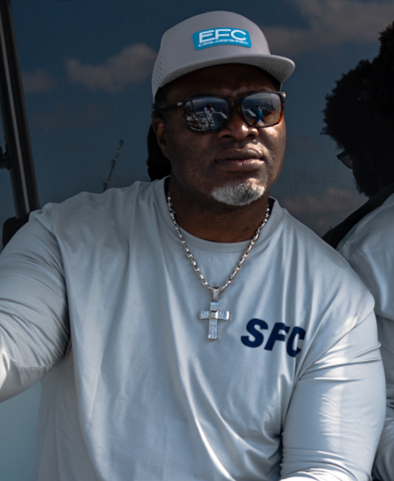
- Bennett in 2024

No. 30, 32
- Position: Fullback

Personal information
- Born: September 14, 1972 (age 54); Fort Lauderdale, Florida, U.S.
- Listed height: 6 ft 0 in (1.83 m)
- Listed weight: 246 lb (112 kg)

Career information
- High school: Cardinal Gibbons (Fort Lauderdale)
- College: Miami (FL)
- NFL draft: 1994: 2nd round, 58th overall pick

Career history
- Kansas City Chiefs (1994–2000); Washington Redskins (2001)

Awards and highlights
- National champion (1991)

Career NFL statistics
- Rushing yards: 1,941
- Average per carry: 3.7
- Rushing touchdowns: 17
- Stats at Pro Football Reference

Donnell Bennett Jr. (born September 14, 1972) is an American former professional football player who was a fullback in the National Football League (NFL) for the Kansas City Chiefs and Washington Redskins.

Bennett attended Cardinal Gibbons High School. He played college football for the Miami Hurricanes and was selected 58th overall in the second round of the 1994 NFL draft. He is married to Adrienne Bennett and has four sons: Matthew, Donnell III, Coleman, and Caden.
