= Olandis Gary =

American football player (born 1975)

No. 22, 33, 38
- Position: Running back

Personal information
- Born: May 18, 1975 (age 51); Washington, D.C., U.S.
- Listed height: 5 ft 11 in (1.80 m)
- Listed weight: 218 lb (99 kg)

Career information
- High school: Riverdale Baptist School (Upper Marlboro, Maryland)
- College: Georgia
- NFL draft: 1999: 4th round, 127th overall pick

Career history
- Denver Broncos (1999–2002); Buffalo Bills (2003)*; Detroit Lions (2003–2004)
- * Offseason or practice squad member only

Awards and highlights
- NFL All-Rookie Team (1999)

Career NFL statistics
- Rushing attempts: 496
- Rushing yards: 1,998
- Rushing touchdowns: 11
- Receptions: 59
- Receiving yards: 415
- Stats at Pro Football Reference

Olandis C. Gary (born May 18, 1975) is an American former professional football player who was a running back in the National Football League (NFL) for the Denver Broncos from 1999 to 2002 and the Detroit Lions from 2003 to 2004. He played college football for the Georgia Bulldogs and was selected in the fourth round of the 1999 NFL draft.

Pre-draft measurables
Height	Weight	40-yard dash	10-yard split	20-yard split	20-yard shuttle	Three-cone drill	Vertical jump	Broad jump	Bench press
5 ft 11 3/4 in (1.82 m)	216 lb (98 kg)	4.71 s	1.60 s	2.64 s	4.13 s	7.15 s	34.0 in (0.86 m)	9 ft 8 in (2.95 m)	22 reps
All values from NFL Combine

His best season in the NFL came in 1999 when he replaced an injured Terrell Davis and rushed for 1,159 yards on 276 attempts, a 4.2 yards per carry average, with seven touchdowns. He injured his knee the following season and appeared to never fully recover, as his success was limited in the following years. He was one of many Broncos running backs to have success in Denver's potent run blocking system, along with Davis, Mike Anderson, Clinton Portis, Reuben Droughns, Tatum Bell, Mike Bell, Selvin Young, and Quentin Griffin.

As of 2017's NFL off-season, Gary still held at least 2 Broncos franchise records, including:

- Rush Attempts: rookie game (37 on 1999-10-17 GNB; with Mike Anderson)
- Rush Yds/Game: rookie season (96.6 in 1999)

== College statistics ==
- 1997: 66 carries for 381 yards with 7 TD. 7 catches for 75 yards with 1 TD.
- 1998: 143 carries for 698 yards with 10 TD. 10 catches for 117 yards.
