= Antoine Winfield Sr. =

American football player (born 1977)

Antoine Winfield
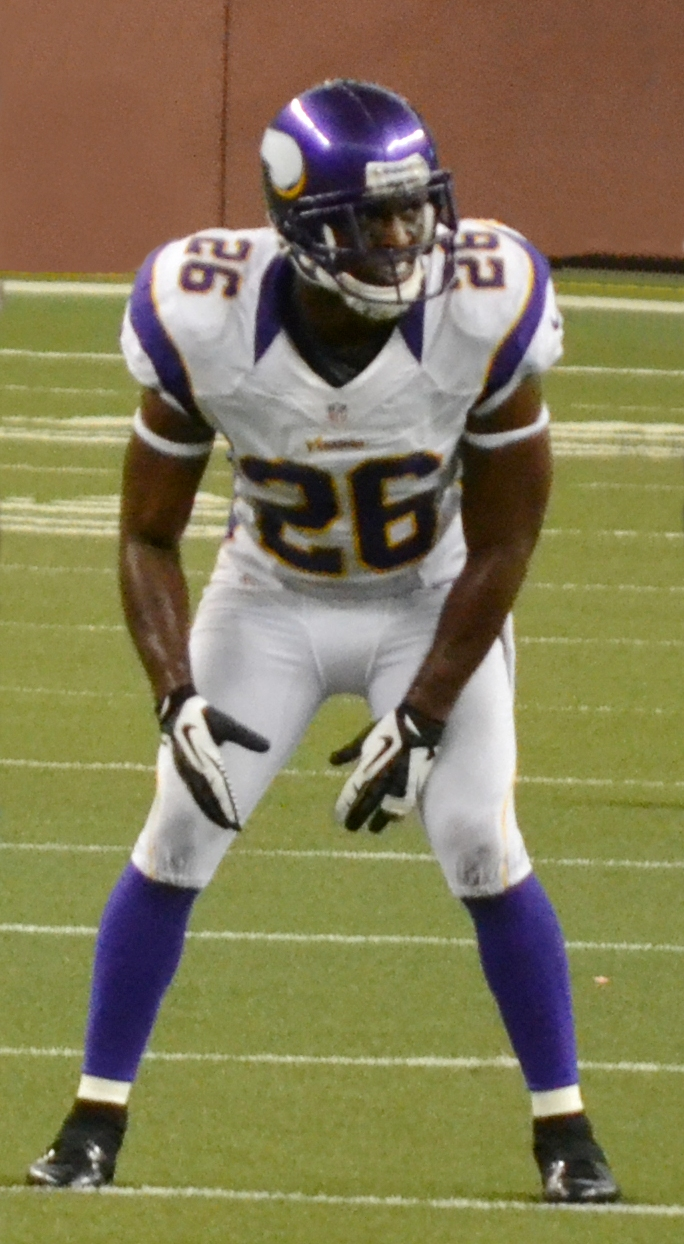
- Winfield with the Minnesota Vikings in 2012

No. 26
- Position: Cornerback

Personal information
- Born: June 24, 1977 (age 49); Akron, Ohio, U.S.
- Listed height: 5 ft 9 in (1.75 m)
- Listed weight: 180 lb (82 kg)

Career information
- High school: Garfield (Akron)
- College: Ohio State (1995–1998)
- NFL draft: 1999: 1st round, 23rd overall pick

Career history
- Buffalo Bills (1999–2003); Minnesota Vikings (2004–2012); Seattle Seahawks (2013)*
- * Offseason or practice squad member only

Awards and highlights
- Second-team All-Pro (2008); 3× Pro Bowl (2008–2010); 50 Greatest Vikings; Jim Thorpe Award (1998); Jack Tatum Trophy (1998); Unanimous All-American (1998); First-team All-American (1997); 2× First-team All-Big Ten (1997, 1998)

Career NFL statistics
- Total tackles: 1,094
- Sacks: 7.5
- Forced fumbles: 14
- Fumble recoveries: 11
- Pass deflections: 117
- Interceptions: 27
- Touchdowns: 5
- Stats at Pro Football Reference

Antoine Duane Winfield Sr. (born June 24, 1977) is an American former professional football cornerback who played in the National Football League (NFL) for 14 seasons, primarily with the Minnesota Vikings. Winfield played college football for the Ohio State Buckeyes, receiving the Jim Thorpe Award, Jack Tatum Trophy, and Unanimous All-American honors in 1998. He was selected in the first round of the 1999 NFL draft by the Buffalo Bills, where he played his first five seasons. Winfield spent the remainder of his career with the Vikings, earning three consecutive Pro Bowl selections. He was named among the 50 Greatest Vikings in 2010.

== Early life ==
Winfield was born in Akron, Ohio. He attended Garfield High School in his hometown of Akron.

== College career ==
Winfield received an athletic scholarship to attend Ohio State University, where he played for the Ohio State Buckeyes football team from 1995 to 1998. As a senior in 1998, he was a consensus first-team All-American, and won the Jim Thorpe Award as the nation's top defensive back.

== Professional career ==
Pre-draft measurables
| Height | Weight | Arm length | Hand span | 40-yard dash | 10-yard split | 20-yard split | 20-yard shuttle | Three-cone drill | Vertical jump | Broad jump |
|---|---|---|---|---|---|---|---|---|---|---|
| 5 ft 8 5/8 in (1.74 m) | 176 lb (80 kg) | 29 3/4 in (0.76 m) | 8 1/2 in (0.22 m) | 4.41 s | 1.53 s | 2.57 s | 3.95 s | 6.84 s | 37.0 in (0.94 m) | 10 ft 2 in (3.10 m) |
All values from NFL Combine

=== Buffalo Bills ===
The Buffalo Bills selected Winfield in the first round (23rd overall pick) of the 1999 NFL draft, and he played for the Bills from 1999 to 2003.

==== 1999 ====
On July 30, 1999, the Buffalo Bills signed Winfield to a five-year, $7.98 million contract. Head coach Wade Phillips named Winfield the third cornerback in the depth chart to begin the regular season, behind veterans Thomas Smith and Ken Irvin.

Winfield made his professional regular season debut in the Buffalo Bills’ season-opener at the Indianapolis Colts and recorded three combined tackles and made his first career interception during their 31–14 loss. Winfield made his first career interception off a pass attempt by Colts’ quarterback Peyton Manning, that was originally intended for the wide receiver Jerome Pathon, and returned it for a three-yard gain in the fourth quarter. On December 26, 1999, Winfield earned his first career start in place of Ken Irvin who was placed on injured reserve due to a foot injury he sustained the previous week. He finished his first career start with one tackle during their 13–10 victory at the New England Patriots in a Week 16. In Week 17, Winfield collected a season-high 11 combined tackles as the Bills defeated the Indianapolis Colts 31–6. He finished his rookie season in 1999 with 40 combined tackles and two interceptions in 16 games and two starts.

The Buffalo Bills finished second in the AFC East with an 11–5 record and earned a wildcard berth. On January 8, 2000, Winfield started in his first career playoff game and recorded three combined tackles and intercepted a pass by Titans’ quarterback Steve McNair during their 22–16 loss at the Tennessee Titans in the AFC Wildcard Game.

==== 2000 ====
Winfield entered training camp slated as a starting cornerback after Thomas Smith departed during free agency and signed with the Chicago Bears. Head coach Wade Phillips named Winfield and Ken Irvin the starting cornerbacks to begin the regular season. In Week 9, Winfield collected a season-high nine combined tackles during a 23–20 victory against the New York Jets. On November 5, 2000, Winfield sustained a shoulder injury during a 16–13 win at the New England Patriots. On November 19, 2000, Winfield further aggravated his shoulder injury during a 21–17 victory at the Kansas City Chiefs. On November 24, 2000, the Buffalo Bills placed Winfield on injured reserve after it was discovered he had a torn labrum cartilage in his right shoulder that would require surgery.

==== 2001 ====
On January 8, 2001, the Buffalo Bills fired head coach Wade Phillips after they finished with an 8–8 record in 2000. Head coach Gregg Williams retained Winfield and Ken Irvin as the starting cornerbacks to begin the regular season. On September 23, 2001, Winfield recorded three combined tackles, a pass deflection, forced a fumble, and intercepted a pass by Colts’ quarterback Peyton Manning during a 42–26 loss at the Indianapolis Colts in Week 2. In Week 14, he collected a season-high eight solo tackles as the Bills loss 12–9 to the New England Patriots. He started in all 16 games in 2001 and recorded 80 combined tackles (68 solo), nine pass deflections, and two interceptions.

==== 2002 ====
Winfield returned as a starting cornerback in 2002. He started alongside his former Ohio State teammate Nate Clements. In Week 3, Winfield collected a season-high nine combined tackles during a 28–23 loss at the Denver Broncos in Week 3. Winfield missed three games (Weeks 7–9) due to a knee injury. On October 18, 2002, Winfield underwent arthroscopic surgery on his knee. He finished the season with 56 combined tackles (51 solo) and seven pass deflections in 13 games and 13 starts.

==== 2003 ====
Defensive coordinator Jerry Gray retained Winfield and Nate Clements the starting cornerback duo in 2003. On October 5, 2003, Winfield collected a season-high 12 combined tackles (11 solo) as the Bills defeated the Cincinnati Bengals 22–16. On November 23, 2003, Winfield recorded ten combined tackles (seven solo) and made his first career sack during a 17–14 loss against the Indianapolis Colts in Week 12. Winfield sacked Colts’ quarterback Peyton Manning for a six-yard loss during the first quarter. Winfield started in all 16 games in 2003 and recorded a career-high 107 combined tackles (92 solo), 11 pass deflections, two forced fumbles, one sack, and an interception.

==== 2004 ====
Winfield became an unrestricted free agent in 2004 and was considered by many analysts to be the top free agent cornerback on the market. He was heavily pursued by multiple teams, including the New York Jets, Miami Dolphins, Houston Texans, and Minnesota Vikings. On March 4, 2004, it was reported that the New York Jets and Winfield has agreed, in principle, to a six-year, $30 million contract with $10 million guaranteed. Winfield attended a visit with the Minnesota Vikings and officially signed with them the following day.

=== Minnesota Vikings ===
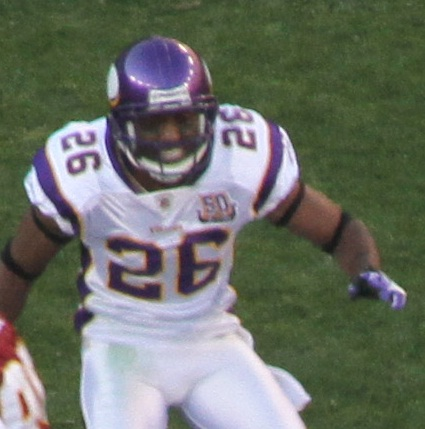
Winfield in 2010

On March 5, 2004, the Minnesota Vikings signed Winfield to a six-year, $34.8 million contract that includes a signing bonus of $10.8 million. Head coach Mike Tice named Winfield and Brian Williams the starting cornerbacks to start the regular season.

On October 17, 2004, Winfield recorded seven combined tackles, deflected a pass, and made his first interception as a member of the Vikings during a 38–31 win at the New Orleans Saints. Winfield intercepted a pass by Saints’ quarterback Aaron Brooks, that was intended for wide receiver Ernie Conwell, and returned it for a 56-yard gain during the first quarter. The following week, Winfield made eight solo tackles, two pass deflections, and intercepted a pass attempt by Titans’ quarterback Billy Volek during a 20–3 victory against the Tennessee Titans in Week 7. In Week 9, he collected a season-high 13 combined tackles (ten solo) and broke up two passes during a 31–28 loss at the Indianapolis Colts. Winfield was inactive for two games (Weeks 14–15) due to an ankle injury. Winfield finished the 2004 NFL season with 85 combined tackles (70 solo), five passes defenses, three interceptions, and two forced fumbles in 14 games and 14 starts.

==== 2005 ====
Head coach Mike Tice named Winfield and newly acquired free agent Fred Smoot the starting cornerbacks to begin 2005. They started alongside safeties Corey Chavous and Darren Sharper. On November 6, 2005, Winfield collected a season-high 14 combined tackles (11 solo), deflected two passes, and made an interception off Lions’ quarterback Joey Harrington during a 27–14 win against the Detroit Lions in Week 9. In Week 12, Winfield made nine combined tackles, a season-high three pass deflections, and intercepted a pass by Trent Dilfer as the Vikings defeated the Cleveland Browns 24–12.

==== 2006–2008 ====
In the Vikings' 30–27 win over the New Orleans Saints on Week 5 (October 6) of 2008, a Monday Night Football game, Winfield returned a blocked field goal attempt by Martin Gramatica 59 yards for a touchdown. Additionally, Winfield had 8 tackles and one deflected pass that game. Winfield finished 2008 with 95 total tackles, 2 sacks, 5 passes defended, and one interception. He made his first Pro Bowl in 2008.

==== 2009 ====
On July 23, 2009, the Vikings signed Winfield to a new five-year, $36 million contract. The deal includes $16.1 million in guarantees. He made his second straight Pro Bowl in 2010 after replacing injured Dominique Rodgers-Cromartie. After making the 2010 Pro Bowl squad, he made an interception that led to a touchdown in an NFC 55–41 victory. He is regarded as one of the most physical corners in the league, known for his bone-jarring hits, and was ranked by Peter King of Sports Illustrated as the 31st best player in the NFL.

==== 2010–2012 ====
Winfield was the only player on the Vikings' active 2012 roster who played during the 1990s.

==== 2013 ====
Winfield was released by the Minnesota Vikings on March 12, 2013, in a move to clear $7.25 million in salary cap space.

=== Seattle Seahawks ===
Winfield signed with the Seattle Seahawks on April 17, 2013, to a one-year, $3 million contract. He was assigned number 21 due to starting fullback Michael Robinson having already been assigned 26 in 2010. He was released from the team during final cuts on August 31, 2013.

=== Retirement ===
On August 31, 2013, Seattle Seahawks coach Pete Carroll announced on Twitter that Winfield was retiring.

== NFL career statistics ==
Legend
| **Bold** | Career high |

Regular season statistics
| Year | Team | GP | Tackles | | | | Fumbles | | | Interceptions | | | | | |
| Year | Team | GP | Cmb | Solo | Ast | Sck | FF | FR | Yds | Int | Yds | Avg | Lng | TD | PD |
|---|---|---|---|---|---|---|---|---|---|---|---|---|---|---|---|
| 1999 | BUF | 16 | 62 | 60 | 2 | 0.0 | 0 | 0 | 0 | 2 | 13 | 6.5 | 10 | 0 | 6 |
| 2000 | BUF | 11 | 49 | 41 | 8 | 0.0 | 0 | 0 | 0 | 1 | 8 | 8.0 | 8 | 0 | 7 |
| 2001 | BUF | 16 | 81 | 69 | 12 | 0.0 | 1 | 1 | 5 | 2 | 0 | 0.0 | 0 | 0 | 11 |
| 2002 | BUF | 13 | 56 | 51 | 5 | 0.0 | 0 | 1 | 0 | 0 | 0 | 0.0 | 0 | 0 | 7 |
| 2003 | BUF | 16 | **109** | **94** | 15 | 1.0 | 2 | 0 | 0 | 1 | 11 | 11.0 | 11 | 0 | 12 |
| 2004 | MIN | 14 | 88 | 72 | 16 | 0.0 | 2 | 1 | 0 | 3 | **89** | **29.7** | **56** | 0 | 8 |
| 2005 | MIN | 16 | 98 | 89 | 9 | 0.0 | 0 | **2** | 0 | **4** | 5 | 1.3 | 4 | 0 | 8 |
| 2006 | MIN | 16 | 98 | 84 | 14 | 0.0 | 0 | 1 | 0 | **4** | 33 | 8.3 | 26 | **1** | **14** |
| 2007 | MIN | 10 | 70 | 61 | 9 | 0.0 | 1 | 1 | 0 | 1 | 14 | 14.0 | 14 | **1** | 9 |
| 2008 | MIN | 16 | 96 | 82 | 14 | **2.0** | **4** | **2** | 28 | 2 | 5 | 2.5 | 4 | 0 | 11 |
| 2009 | MIN | 10 | 55 | 53 | 2 | 1.0 | 1 | 0 | 0 | 1 | 0 | 0.0 | 0 | 0 | 5 |
| 2010 | MIN | 16 | 91 | 73 | 18 | **2.0** | 2 | 1 | **45** | 2 | 41 | 20.5 | 41 | 0 | 5 |
| 2011 | MIN | 5 | 40 | 34 | 6 | 1.0 | 1 | 0 | 0 | 1 | 3 | 3.0 | 3 | 0 | 1 |
| 2012 | MIN | 16 | 101 | 72 | **29** | 0.5 | 0 | 1 | 0 | 3 | 37 | 12.3 | 31 | 0 | 13 |
| Career | | 191 | 1,094 | 935 | 159 | 7.5 | 14 | 11 | 78 | 27 | 259 | 10 | 56 | 2 | 117 |

=== Records and notable statistics ===
NFL
| Accomplishment | Record | Refs |
Regular season
| 2nd most tackles by a Defensive Back (Note: 2nd to Ronde Barber during the same time period) | 684 (2000s) | |
| 12th most tackles | 684 (2000s) | |
| 1 of 4 players to record (Note: Honored shared with Ronde Barber, Ray Lewis, and Keith Bulluck.) | 600+ Tkl, 65+ PD, 15+ Int, 10+ FF(2000s) | |

== Personal life ==
Winfield's son, Antoine Jr., is a defensive back for the Tampa Bay Buccaneers.
