= 2005 Minnesota Vikings season =

NFL team season

- Owner: Zygi Wilf
- General manager: Rob Brzezinski
- Head coach: Mike Tice
- Home stadium: Hubert H. Humphrey Metrodome

Results
- Record: 9–7
- Division place: 2nd NFC North
- Playoffs: Did not qualify
- All-Pros: FS Darren Sharper (2nd team)
- Pro Bowlers: FS Darren Sharper; KR Koren Robinson

Uniform
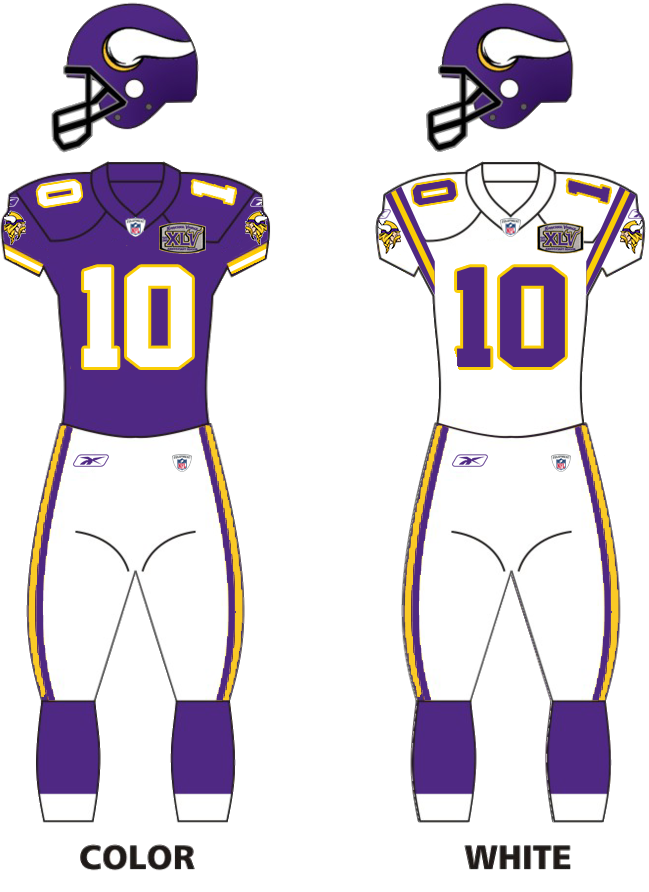

The 2005 season was the Minnesota Vikings' 45th in the National Football League (NFL), and Mike Tice's fourth and final season as head coach. The Vikings finished the season with a 9–7 record and missed the playoffs despite going 8–3 over the final 11 weeks. Quarterback Daunte Culpepper was injured after seven games, resulting in Brad Johnson taking over as starter. The loss of Culpepper and the departure of Randy Moss to the Oakland Raiders resulted in the Vikings dropping from 2nd in passing offense in 2004 to 20th in 2005.

During the team's bye week in week 5, a scandal arose surrounding an alleged sex party aboard a pair of boats on Lake Minnetonka.

== Offseason ==
In February 2005, Vikings owner Red McCombs agreed to sell the team to Arizona-based entrepreneur Reggie Fowler; however, Fowler was unable to prove his finances sound enough to complete the purchase and his application to buy the team was rejected by the league. He brought in various partners, including New York-based real estate developer Zygi Wilf, who took over as the lead owner, with Fowler as one of the minor partners. The deal to install Wilf as owner was concluded in May 2005.

=== Free agents ===
Additions	Subtractions
S Darren Sharper (Packers)	S Brian Russell (Browns)
DT Pat Williams (Bills)	DT Chris Hovan (Buccaneers)
CB Fred Smoot (Redskins)	QB Gus Frerotte (Dolphins)
QB Brad Johnson (Buccaneers)	K Morten Andersen
WR Travis Taylor (Ravens)	LB Chris Claiborne (Rams)
WR Koren Robinson (Seahawks)	C Bill Conaty (Cardinals)
K Paul Edinger (Bears)	G David Dixon

=== Trades ===
Date	Trade partner	From Vikings	To Vikings
March 2, 2005	Oakland Raiders	WR Randy Moss	LB Napoleon Harris; 2005 1st round pick 2005 7th round pick
March 19, 2005	New York Jets	2005 7th round pick	LB Sam Cowart

=== 2005 draft ===
2005 Minnesota Vikings Draft
Draft order		Player name	Position	College	Notes
Round	Selection	Player name	Position	College	Notes
1	7	Troy Williamson	Wide receiver	South Carolina	From Raiders (Note: The Vikings traded WR Randy Moss to the Raiders in exchange for LB Napoleon Harris, and first- and seventh-round selections (7th and 219th overall).)
1	18	Erasmus James	Defensive end	Wisconsin	
2	49	Marcus Johnson	Offensive tackle	Ole Miss	
3	80	Dustin Fox	Cornerback	Ohio State	
4	112	Ciatrick Fason	Running back	Florida	From Redskins (Note: The Vikings traded their fourth- and fifth-round selections (120th and 154th overall) to the Redskins in exchange for a fourth-round selection (112th overall).)
4	120	Traded to the Washington Redskins			
5	154	Traded to the Washington Redskins			
6	191	C. J. Mosley	Defensive tackle	Missouri	
7	219	Adrian Ward	Cornerback	UTEP	From Raiders
7	230	Traded to the New York Jets (Note: The Vikings traded their seventh-round selection (230th overall) to the Jets in exchange for LB Sam Cowart.)			

=== Undrafted free agents ===
2005 undrafted free agents of note
Player	Position	College
David Bamiro	Linebacker	SUNY-Stony Brook
John Bowenkamp	Quarterback	North Dakota
Eric Coleman	Defensive tackle	Clemson
Dovonte Edwards	Cornerback	NC State
Heath Farwell	Linebacker	San Diego State
Laroni Gallishaw	Cornerback	Murray State
David Harley	Defensive tackle	Rutgers
Chris Jahnke	Tackle	Indiana
Chris Jones	Wide receiver	Jackson State
Rian Melander	Tackle	Minnesota
Jonathan Nichols	Kicker	Ole Miss
William Obeng	Tackle	San Jose State
Matt Ross	Tight end	Texas Lutheran
Kyle Schmitt	Center	Maryland

== Staff ==
2005 Minnesota Vikings staff
Front office: Owner/chairman – Zygi Wilf; Owner/president – Mark Wilf; Vice president of football operations – Rob Brzezinski; Head coaches: Head coach – Mike Tice; Assistant head coach/defensive coordinator – Ted Cottrell; Offensive coaches: Offensive coordinator/offensive line – Steve Loney; Quarterbacks – Rich Olson; Running backs – Dean Dalton; Wide receivers – Wes Chandler; Tight ends/assistant offensive line – John Tice; Offensive assistant/assistant quarterbacks – Randy Hanson	Defensive coaches: Defensive line – Brian Baker; Assistant defensive line – Jim Panagos; Linebackers – Pete Bercich; Coverage coordinator – Chuck Knox Jr.; Assistant secondary – Kevin Ross; Special teams coaches: Special teams coordinator – Rusty Tillman; Assistant special teams – Jim Panagos; Strength and conditioning: Strength and conditioning – Kurtis Shultz; Assistant strength and conditioning – Mark Ellis

== Final roster ==
2005 Minnesota Vikings roster
Quarterbacks (QB): 13 Shaun Hill; 14 Brad Johnson; 9 J. T. O'Sullivan; Running backs (RB): 23 Michael Bennett; 39 Adimchinobe Echemandu; 35 Ciatrick Fason; 30 Mewelde Moore; Wide receivers (WR): 81 Nate Burleson; 17 Chris Jones; 18 Koren Robinson; 87 Marcus Robinson; 89 Travis Taylor; 19 Troy Williamson; Tight ends (TE): 86 Richard Angulo; 83 Jeff Dugan; 40 Jim Kleinsasser; 49 Richard Owens; 85 Jermaine Wiggins	Offensive linemen (OL): 67 Melvin Fowler C; 73 Adam Goldberg G; 64 Anthony Herrera G; 76 Chris Liwienski G; 72 Marcus Johnson; 74 Bryant McKinnie LT; 75 Mike Rosenthal RT; 60 Cory Withrow C; Defensive linemen (DL): 99 Erasmus James DE; 97 Spencer Johnson DE; 51 Lance Johnstone DE; 96 C. J. Mosley DT; 98 Darrion Scott DE; 93 Kevin Williams DT; 94 Pat Williams DT	Linebackers (LB): 55 Sam Cowart MLB; 50 Rod Davis MLB; 59 Heath Farwell OLB; 58 Napoleon Harris OLB; 56 E. J. Henderson OLB; 52 Keith Newman OLB; 57 Raonall Smith OLB; 54 Dontarrious Thomas OLB; Defensive backs (DB): 33 Ralph Brown CB; 21 Corey Chavous SS; 31 Ukee Dozier CB; 36 Dovonte Edwards CB; 25 Will Hunter SS; 42 Darren Sharper FS; 27 Fred Smoot CB; 29 Brian Williams CB; 26 Antoine Winfield CB; Special teams (ST): 1 Paul Edinger K; 5 Chris Kluwe P; 46 Cullen Loeffler LS	Practice squad: -- Phil Archer LB; -- Sean Bubin OT; -- Kelvin Kight WR; -- Elton Patterson DE; 90 Eric Taylor DT; 34 Butchie Wallace RB; -- Marvin Ward CB; 63 Mark Wilson OT; Reserve: 78 Matt Birk C (IR); -- T. J. Cottrell TE (IR); 11 Daunte Culpepper QB (IR); 79 Toniu Fonoti G (IR); 37 Dustin Fox CB (IR); 28 Laroni Gallishaw CB (IR); -- Aaron Hosack WR (NF-Inj.); 24 Willie Offord S (IR); 32 Onterrio Smith RB (Susp.); 95 Kenechi Udeze DE (IR); 20 Moe Williams RB (IR); Rookies in italics 53 active, 11 reserve, 8 practice squad

== Preseason ==
=== Schedule ===
Week	Date	Opponent	Result	Record	Venue	Attendance	NFL.com recap
1	August 12	Kansas City Chiefs	W 27–16	1–0	Hubert H. Humphrey Metrodome	63,621	Recap
2	August 19	at New York Jets	L 21–28	1–1	Giants Stadium	76,441	Recap
3	August 26	San Diego Chargers	W 19–16	2–1	Hubert H. Humphrey Metrodome	64,172	Recap
4	September 2	at Seattle Seahawks	W 23–21	3–1	Qwest Field	63,746	Recap

=== Game summaries ===
==== Week 1: vs. Kansas City Chiefs ====
Week 1: Kansas City Chiefs at Minnesota Vikings – Game summary

Quarter	1	2	3	4	Total
Chiefs	3	0	6	7	16
Vikings	7	13	0	7	27

at Hubert H. Humphrey Metrodome, Minneapolis, Minnesota

- Date: August 12
- Game time: 7:00 p.m. CDT
- Game weather: None (indoor stadium)
- Game attendance: 63,621
- Referee: Ron Winter (14)
- Recap, Game Book

Game information

First quarter

- MIN – Nate Burleson 33-yard pass from Daunte Culpepper (Aaron Elling kick), 11:52. Vikings 7–0. Drive: 6 plays, 65 yards, 3:08.
- KC – Lawrence Tynes 19-yard field goal, 3:14. Vikings 7–3. Drive: 9 plays, 54 yards, 4:11.

Second quarter

- MIN – Mewelde Moore 7-yard pass from Brad Johnson (Paul Edinger kick), 7:00. Vikings 14–3. Drive: 8 plays, 72 yards, 4:25.
- MIN – Aaron Elling 40-yard field goal, 1:43. Vikings 17–3. Drive: 7 plays, 57 yards, 2:33.
- MIN – Paul Edinger 48-yard field goal, 0:01. Vikings 20–3. Drive: 5 plays, 35 yards, 0:32.

Third quarter

- KC – Lawrence Tynes 29-yard field goal, 9:40. Vikings 20–6. Drive: 12 plays, 68 yards, 5:20.
- KC – Lawrence Tynes 51-yard field goal, 2:27. Vikings 20–9. Drive: 7 plays, 4 yards, 4:07.

Fourth quarter

- MIN – Ciatrick Fason 1-yard run (Aaron Elling kick), 6:37. Vikings 27–9. Drive: 15 plays, 77 yards, 8:11.
- KC – James Kilian 3-yard run (Lawrence Tynes kick), 0:29. Vikings 27–16. Drive: 11 plays, 82 yards, 2:07.

Top passers

- KC – Damon Huard – 14/26, 125 yards, INT
- MIN – Brad Johnson – 9/12, 87 yards, TD

Top rushers

- KC – Priest Holmes – 4 rushes, 42 yards
- MIN – Mewelde Moore – 5 rushes, 62 yards

Top receivers

- KC – Richard Smith – 3 receptions, 36 yards
- MIN – Ryan Hoag – 5 receptions, 63 yards

==== Week 2: at New York Jets ====
Week 2: Minnesota Vikings at New York Jets – Game summary

Quarter	1	2	3	4	Total
Vikings	0	7	7	7	21
Jets	0	14	7	7	28

at Giants Stadium, East Rutherford, New Jersey

- Date: August 19
- Game time: 8:05 p.m. EDT/7:05 p.m. CDT
- Game weather: 71 °F (22 °C)
- Game attendance: 76,441
- Referee: Jeff Triplette (42)
- Recap, Game Book

Game information

First quarter

- No scoring plays.

Second quarter

- MIN – Moe Williams 1-yard run (Paul Edinger kick), 8:27. Vikings 7–0. Drive: 10 plays, 66 yards, 5:37.
- NYJ – Laveranues Coles 20-yard pass from Chad Pennington (Mike Nugent kick), 4:54. Tied 7–7. Drive: 9 plays, 80 yards, 3:33.
- NYJ – Wayne Chrebet 18-yard pass from Jay Fiedler (Mike Nugent kick), 2:47. Jets 14–7. Drive: 2 plays, 35 yards, 0:45.

Third quarter

- NYJ – Jay Fiedler 1-yard run (Mike Nugent kick), 11:41. Jets 21–7. Drive: 4 plays, 3 yards, 2:06.
- MIN – Troy Williamson 13-yard pass from Shaun Hill (Aaron Elling kick), 3:47. Jets 21–14. Drive: 6 plays, 80 yards, 2:42.

Fourth quarter

- MIN – Adimchinobe Echemandu 1-yard run (Paul Edinger kick), 14:09. Tied 21–21. Drive: 9 plays, 58 yards, 3:05.
- NYJ – Cedric Houston 10-yard run (Mike Nugent kick), 5:52. Jets 28–21. Drive: 3 plays, 30 yards, 0:56.

Top passers

- MIN – Daunte Culpepper – 11/13, 146 yards
- NYJ – Chad Pennington – 9/10, 86 yards, TD

Top rushers

- MIN – Mewelde Moore – 6 rushes, 24 yards
- NYJ – Cedric Houston – 6 rushes, 26 yards, TD

Top receivers

- MIN – Troy Williamson – 2 receptions, 67 yards, TD
- NYJ – Laveranues Coles – 6 receptions, 57 yards, TD

==== Week 3: vs. San Diego Chargers ====
Week 3: San Diego Chargers at Minnesota Vikings – Game summary

Quarter	1	2	3	4	Total
Chargers	7	0	3	6	16
Vikings	3	13	3	0	19

at Hubert H. Humphrey Metrodome, Minneapolis, Minnesota

- Date: August 26
- Game time: 7:05 p.m. CDT
- Game weather: None (indoor stadium)
- Game attendance: 64,172
- Referee: Tom White (123)
- Recap, Game Book

Game information

First quarter

- SD – Keenan McCardell 16-yard pass from Drew Brees (Nate Kaeding kick), 5:34. Chargers 7–0. Drive: 11 plays, 88 yards, 5:33.
- MIN – Paul Edinger 25-yard field goal, 0:15. Chargers 7–3. Drive: 9 plays, 84 yards, 5:19.

Second quarter

- MIN – Paul Edinger 30-yard field goal, 6:50. Chargers 7–6. Drive: 9 plays, 79 yards, 4:54.
- MIN – Paul Edinger 50-yard field goal, 3:01. Vikings 9–7. Drive: 5 plays, 40 yards, 1:50.
- MIN – Adimchinobe Echemandu 1-yard run (Paul Edinger kick), 0:04. Vikings 16–7. Drive: 9 plays, 80 yards, 1:43.

Third quarter

- MIN – Paul Edinger 20-yard field goal, 4:50. Vikings 19–7. Drive: 13 plays, 74 yards, 6:39.
- SD – Nate Kaeding 46-yard field goal, 0:18. Vikings 19–10. Drive: 10 plays, 46 yards, 4:32.

Fourth quarter

- SD – Carl Morris 13-yard pass from Cleo Lemon (run failed), 3:48. Vikings 19–16. Drive: 5 plays, 56 yards, 2:33.

Top passers

- SD – Cleo Lemon – 14/19, 136 yards, TD
- MIN – Daunte Culpepper – 12/14, 197 yards

Top rushers

- SD – Derek Farmer – 2 rushes, 31 yards
- MIN – Adimchinobe Echemandu – 14 rushes, 55 yards, TD

Top receivers

- SD – Duncan Reid – 3 receptions, 51 yards
- MIN – Nate Burleson – 5 receptions, 97 yards

==== Week 4: at Seattle Seahawks ====
Week 4: Minnesota Vikings at Seattle Seahawks – Game summary

Quarter	1	2	3	4	Total
Vikings	7	3	0	13	23
Seahawks	7	0	7	7	21

at Qwest Field, Seattle, Washington

- Date: September 2
- Game time: 6:05 p.m. PDT/8:05 p.m. CDT
- Game weather: Sunny, 70 °F (21 °C)
- Game attendance: 63,746
- Referee: Pete Morelli (135)
- Recap, Game Book

Game information

First quarter

- SEA – Jerramy Stevens 24-yard pass from Matt Hasselbeck (Josh Brown kick), 6:41. Seahawks 7–0. Drive: 5 plays, 83 yards, 2:02.
- MIN – Daunte Culpepper 1-yard run (Paul Edinger kick), 1:07. Tied 7–7. Drive: 11 plays, 63 yards, 5:34.

Second quarter

- MIN – Paul Edinger 43-yard field goal, 8:10. Vikings 10–7. Drive: 4 plays, 2 yards, 0:47.

Third quarter

- SEA – Leonard Weaver 31-yard run (Josh Brown kick), 6:30. Seahawks 14–10. Drive: 8 plays, 66 yards, 3:18.

Fourth quarter

- MIN – Butchie Wallace 3-yard run (Paul Edinger kick), 14:51. Vikings 17–14. Drive: 4 plays, 24 yards, 1:56.
- SEA – Marquis Weeks 1-yard run (Josh Brown kick), 11:28. Seahawks 21–17. Drive: 7 plays, 43 yards, 3:23.
- MIN – Paul Edinger 48-yard field goal, 5:42. Seahawks 21–20. Drive: 4 plays, −7 yards, 1:41.
- MIN – Paul Edinger 35-yard field goal, 0:00. Vikings 23–21. Drive: 10 plays, 62 yards, 2:10.

Top passers

- MIN – Shaun Hill – 10/17, 110 yards
- SEA – Seneca Wallace – 14/19, 96 yards, INT

Top rushers

- MIN – Butchie Wallace – 11 rushes, 33 yards, TD
- SEA – Marquis Weeks – 17 rushes, 61 yards, TD

Top receivers

- MIN – Ryan Hoag – 2 receptions, 49 yards
- SEA – Darrell Jackson – 2 receptions, 36 yards

== Regular season ==
=== Schedule ===
Week	Date	Opponent	Result	Record	Venue	Attendance	NFL.com recap
1	September 11	Tampa Bay Buccaneers	**L** 13–24	0–1	Hubert H. Humphrey Metrodome	63,939	Recap
2	September 18	at Cincinnati Bengals	**L** 8–37	0–2	Paul Brown Stadium	65,763	Recap
3	September 25	New Orleans Saints	**W** 33–16	1–2	Hubert H. Humphrey Metrodome	63,952	Recap
4	October 2	at Atlanta Falcons	**L** 10–30	1–3	Georgia Dome	69,552	Recap
5	Bye						
6	October 16	at **Chicago Bears**	**L** 3–28	1–4	Soldier Field	62,143	Recap
7	October 23	**Green Bay Packers**	**W** 23–20	2–4	Hubert H. Humphrey Metrodome	64,278	Recap
8	October 30	at Carolina Panthers	**L** 13–38	2–5	Bank of America Stadium	73,502	Recap
9	November 6	**Detroit Lions**	**W** 27–14	3–5	Hubert H. Humphrey Metrodome	63,813	Recap
10	November 13	at New York Giants	**W** 24–21	4–5	Giants Stadium	78,637	Recap
11	November 21	at **Green Bay Packers**	**W** 20–17	5–5	Lambeau Field	70,610	Recap
12	November 27	Cleveland Browns	**W** 24–12	6–5	Hubert H. Humphrey Metrodome	63,814	Recap
13	December 4	at **Detroit Lions**	**W** 21–16	7–5	Ford Field	61,375	Recap
14	December 11	St. Louis Rams	**W** 27–13	8–5	Hubert H. Humphrey Metrodome	64,005	Recap
15	December 18	Pittsburgh Steelers	**L** 3–18	8–6	Hubert H. Humphrey Metrodome	64,136	Recap
16	December 25	at Baltimore Ravens	**L** 23–30	8–7	M&T Bank Stadium	70,246	Recap
17	January 1	**Chicago Bears**	**W** 34–10	9–7	Hubert H. Humphrey Metrodome	64,023	Recap

Note: Intra-division opponents are in bold text.

=== Game summaries ===
==== Week 1: vs. Tampa Bay Buccaneers ====
Week 1: Tampa Bay Buccaneers at Minnesota Vikings – Game summary

Quarter	1	2	3	4	Total
**Buccaneers**	0	17	0	7	**24**
Vikings	7	0	3	3	**13**

at Hubert H. Humphrey Metrodome, Minneapolis, Minnesota

- Date: September 11
- Game time: 12:00 p.m. CDT
- Game weather: None (indoor stadium)
- Game attendance: 63,939
- Referee: Mike Carey (94)
- TV announcers (FOX): Curt Menefee, J.C. Pearson & Jay Glazer
- Recap, Game Book

Game information

**First quarter**

- MIN – Darren Sharper 88-yard interception return (Paul Edinger kick), 2:44. Vikings 7–0.

**Second quarter**

- TB – Alex Smith 23-yard pass from Brian Griese (Matt Bryant kick), 14:55. Tied 7–7. **Drive: 8 plays, 71 yards, 2:49.**
- TB – Alex Smith 2-yard pass from Brian Griese (Matt Bryant kick), 4:38. Buccaneers 14–7. **Drive: 11 plays, 80 yards, 6:25.**
- TB – Matt Bryant 41-yard field goal, 0:17. Buccaneers 17–7. **Drive: 9 plays, 46 yards, 2:43.**

**Third quarter**

- MIN – Paul Edinger 53-yard field goal, 3:52. Buccaneers 17–10. **Drive: 10 plays, 34 yards, 7:07.**

**Fourth quarter**

- MIN – Paul Edinger 22-yard field goal, 6:13. Buccaneers 17–13. **Drive: 10 plays, 41 yards, 5:37.**
- TB – Cadillac Williams 71-yard run (Matt Bryant kick), 1:23. Buccaneers 24–13. **Drive: 3 plays, 80 yards, 0:22.**

**Top passers**

- TB – Brian Griese – 18/29, 213 yards, 2 TD, 2 INT
- MIN – Daunte Culpepper – 22/33, 233 yards, 3 INT

**Top rushers**

- TB – Cadillac Williams – 27 rushes, 148 yards, TD
- MIN – Daunte Culpepper – 3 rushes, 19 yards

**Top receivers**

- TB – Joey Galloway – 5 receptions, 97 yards
- MIN – Nate Burleson – 3 receptions, 45 yards

The Vikings opened the season with five turnovers on the way to their first opening-day loss since 2002. Free agent signing Darren Sharper started off the scoring for the Vikings by returning an interception 88 yards for a touchdown, but the Buccaneers defense was able to limit the Vikings to 26 yards rushing and intercepted reigning Pro Bowl quarterback Daunte Culpepper three times, including two for cornerback Brian Kelly. By contrast, the Buccaneers' rookie running back Cadillac Williams managed 148 yards rushing in his first NFL game, capped off with a 71-yard touchdown run with less than two minutes left to seal the game for Tampa Bay.

==== Week 2: at Cincinnati Bengals ====
Week 2: Minnesota Vikings at Cincinnati Bengals – Game summary

Quarter	1	2	3	4	Total
Vikings	0	0	0	8	**8**
**Bengals**	14	13	7	3	**37**

at Paul Brown Stadium, Cincinnati, Ohio

- Date: September 18
- Game time: 1:00 p.m. EDT/12:00 p.m. CDT
- Game weather: Sunny, 74 °F (23 °C)
- Game attendance: 65,763
- Referee: Bill Carollo (63)
- TV announcers (FOX): Sam Rosen, Bill Maas & Jay Glazer
- Recap, Game Book

Game information

**First quarter**

- CIN – Chad Johnson 70-yard pass from Carson Palmer (Shayne Graham kick), 14:08. Bengals 7–0. **Drive: 2 plays, 72 yards, 0:52.**
- CIN – T. J. Houshmandzadeh 12-yard pass from Carson Palmer (Shayne Graham kick), 7:19. Bengals 14–0. **Drive: 8 plays, 48 yards, 4:48.**

**Second quarter**

- CIN – Shayne Graham 40-yard field goal, 5:02. Bengals 17–0. **Drive: 9 plays, 62 yards, 5:35.**
- CIN – Shayne Graham 29-yard field goal, 3:19. Bengals 20–0. **Drive: 4 plays, 4 yards, 1:23.**
- CIN – Matt Schobel 8-yard pass from Carson Palmer (Shayne Graham kick), 0:12. Bengals 27–0. **Drive: 8 plays, 53 yards, 1:41.**

**Third quarter**

- CIN – T. J. Houshmandzadeh 16-yard run (Shayne Graham kick), 2:06. Bengals 34–0. **Drive: 1 play, 16 yards, 0:08.**

**Fourth quarter**

- CIN – Shayne Graham 30-yard field goal, 5:41. Bengals 37–0. **Drive: 13 plays, 67 yards, 7:25.**
- MIN – Daunte Culpepper 5-yard run (Daunte Culpepper–Marcus Robinson pass), 3:17. Bengals 37–8. **Drive: 7 plays, 82 yards, 2:24.**

**Top passers**

- MIN – Daunte Culpepper – 21/37, 236 yards, 5 INT
- CIN – Carson Palmer – 27/40, 337 yards, 3 TD, INT

**Top rushers**

- MIN – Michael Bennett – 3 rushes, 36 yards
- CIN – Rudi Johnson – 22 rushes, 90 yards

**Top receivers**

- MIN – Travis Taylor – 7 receptions, 75 yards
- CIN – Chad Johnson – 7 receptions, 139 yards, TD

The Vikings' misfortunes continued in Week 2, losing 37–8 to the Cincinnati Bengals. Cornerback Fred Smoot was beaten by Chad Johnson on a 70-yard touchdown in the first minute of the game, with Carson Palmer adding two more touchdown passes in the first half to give the Bengals a 27–0 lead at halftime. The Bengals piled on 167 yards rushing, with wide receiver T. J. Houshmandzadeh adding a 16-yard touchdown run in the third quarter. Daunte Culpepper continued his early season struggles, throwing five interceptions, bringing his total to eight in the first two weeks. Culpepper did ensure the Vikings avoided the shutout by scoring on a five-yard touchdown run. The Vikings were again hampered by their rushing attack, being held to 77 yards rushing.

==== Week 3: vs. New Orleans Saints ====
Week 3: New Orleans Saints at Minnesota Vikings – Game summary

Quarter	1	2	3	4	Total
Saints	0	6	3	7	**16**
**Vikings**	17	7	0	9	**33**

at Hubert H. Humphrey Metrodome, Minneapolis, Minnesota

- Date: September 25
- Game time: 12:00 p.m. CDT
- Game weather: None (indoor stadium)
- Game attendance: 63,952
- Referee: Pete Morelli (135)
- TV announcers (FOX): Ron Pitts & Tim Ryan
- Recap, Game Book

Game information

**First quarter**

- MIN – Travis Taylor 24-yard pass from Daunte Culpepper (Paul Edinger kick), 14:47. Vikings 7–0. **Drive: 1 play, 24 yards, 0:06.**
- MIN – Paul Edinger 24-yard field goal, 7:18. Vikings 10–0. **Drive: 12 plays, 78 yards, 5:49.**
- MIN – Travis Taylor 13-yard pass from Daunte Culpepper (Paul Edinger kick), 0:33. Vikings 17–0. **Drive: 5 plays, 26 yards, 2:34.**

**Second quarter**

- MIN – Troy Williamson 53-yard pass from Daunte Culpepper (Paul Edinger kick), 5:37. Vikings 24–0. **Drive: 1 play, 53 yards, 0:07.**
- NO – Ernie Conwell 13-yard pass from Aaron Brooks (pass failed), 1:54. Vikings 24–6. **Drive: 11 plays, 74 yards, 3:43.**

**Third quarter**

- NO – John Carney 22-yard field goal, 5:38. Vikings 24–9. **Drive: 9 plays, 76 yards, 3:34.**

**Fourth quarter**

- NO – Deuce McAllister 1-yard run (John Carney kick), 11:40. Vikings 24–16. **Drive: 8 plays, 64 yards, 3:12.**
- MIN – Paul Edinger 28-yard field goal, 6:17. Vikings 27–16. **Drive: 9 plays, 43 yards, 5:23.**
- MIN – Paul Edinger 48-yard field goal, 4:29. Vikings 30–16. **Drive: 4 plays, 7 yards, 1:36.**
- MIN – Paul Edinger 34-yard field goal, 1:08. Vikings 33–16. **Drive: 7 plays, 16 yards, 2:30.**

**Top passers**

- NO – Aaron Brooks – 12/32, 199 yards, TD, 2 INT
- MIN – Daunte Culpepper – 21/29, 300 yards, 3 TD

**Top rushers**

- NO – Deuce McAllister – 14 rushes, 63 yards, TD
- MIN – Mewelde Moore – 23 rushes, 101 yards

**Top receivers**

- NO – Devery Henderson – 3 receptions, 95 yards
- MIN – Troy Williamson – 3 receptions, 83 yards, TD

In Week 3, the Vikings looked to turn their season around at home to the New Orleans Saints, who were suffering from the effects of Hurricane Katrina, which had devastated their city only a few weeks earlier. The Vikings started positively, forcing a fumble from the Saints' return man Aaron Stecker on the opening kickoff. On the first play from scrimmage, Daunte Culpepper found Travis Taylor for a 24-yard touchdown, and the Vikings did not look back. Culpepper threw two more first-half touchdown passes, and stayed mistake free. The Vikings also found a running game, going for 146 yards, led by Mewelde Moore's 101 yards. Defensively, the Vikings held Aaron Brooks to just 12 completions on 32 pass attempts, intercepting him twice (Antoine Winfield and Keith Newman). Paul Edinger added four field goals for the Vikings in the victory.

==== Week 4: at Atlanta Falcons ====
Week 4: Minnesota Vikings at Atlanta Falcons – Game summary

Quarter	1	2	3	4	Total
Vikings	0	0	0	10	**10**
**Falcons**	7	17	3	3	**30**

at Georgia Dome, Atlanta, Georgia

- Date: October 2
- Game time: 1:00 p.m. EDT/12:00 p.m. CDT
- Game weather: None (indoor stadium)
- Game attendance: 69,552
- Referee: Jeff Triplette (42)
- TV announcers (FOX): Kenny Albert & Brian Baldinger
- Recap, Game Book

Game information

**First quarter**

- ATL – Alge Crumpler 5-yard pass from Michael Vick (Todd Peterson kick), 7:44. Falcons 7–0. **Drive: 8 plays, 78 yards, 4:36.**

**Second quarter**

- ATL – T. J. Duckett 1-yard run (Todd Peterson kick), 12:55. Falcons 14–0. **Drive: 14 plays, 63 yards, 7:50.**
- ATL – Warrick Dunn 37-yard run (Todd Peterson kick), 3:40. Falcons 21–0. **Drive: 3 plays, 69 yards, 1:22.**
- ATL – Todd Peterson 38-yard field goal, 0:01. Falcons 24–0. **Drive: 8 plays, 61 yards, 1:18.**

**Third quarter**

- ATL – Todd Peterson 26-yard field goal, 0:04. Falcons 27–0. **Drive: 12 plays, 45 yards, 5:28.**

**Fourth quarter**

- MIN – Paul Edinger 43-yard field goal, 8:13. Falcons 27–3. **Drive: 11 plays, 54 yards, 4:21.**
- ATL – Todd Peterson 39-yard field goal, 5:24. Falcons 30–3. **Drive: 5 plays, 18 yards, 2:49.**
- MIN – Troy Williamson 16-yard pass from Daunte Culpepper (Paul Edinger kick), 2:33. Falcons 30–10. **Drive: 11 plays, 67 yards, 2:51.**

**Top passers**

- MIN – Daunte Culpepper – 23/34, 250 yards, TD, 2 INT
- ATL – Michael Vick – 6/8, 49 yards, TD

**Top rushers**

- MIN – Mewelde Moore – 14 rushes, 57 yards
- ATL – Warrick Dunn – 18 rushes, 126 yards, TD

**Top receivers**

- MIN – Mewelde Moore – 6 receptions, 63 yards
- ATL – Brian Finneran – 3 receptions, 31 yards

After notching their first win of the season the week before, the Vikings returned to form in Atlanta the following week, losing 30–10 to the Falcons. The visitors sacked Daunte Culpepper nine times, and added two more interceptions to bring his total for the season to 10 through four games. The Falcons' rushing offense was almost unstoppable, going for 285 yards, with almost half of that total provided by Warrick Dunn (126 yards). For the second time in the season, the Vikings' only points of the game came in the fourth quarter, via a 16-yard pass from Culpepper to Troy Williamson.

==== Week 6: at Chicago Bears ====
Week 6: Minnesota Vikings at Chicago Bears – Game summary

Quarter	1	2	3	4	Total
Vikings	0	3	0	0	**3**
**Bears**	0	7	7	14	**28**

at Soldier Field, Chicago, Illinois

- Date: October 16
- Game time: 12:00 p.m. CDT
- Game weather: Sunny, 57 °F (14 °C)
- Game attendance: 62,143
- Referee: Bernie Kukar (86)
- TV announcers (FOX): Sam Rosen, Bill Maas & Jay Glazer
- Recap, Game Book

Game information

**First quarter**

- No scoring plays.

**Second quarter**

- MIN – Paul Edinger 23-yard field goal, 6:55. Vikings 3–0. **Drive: 12 plays, 48 yards, 7:18.**
- CHI – Desmond Clark 3-yard pass from Kyle Orton (Robbie Gould kick), 0:37. Bears 7–3. **Drive: 8 plays, 49 yards, 2:40.**

**Third quarter**

- CHI – Desmond Clark 2-yard pass from Kyle Orton (Robbie Gould kick), 7:28. Bears 14–3. **Drive: 2 plays, 3 yards, 0:36.**

**Fourth quarter**

- CHI – Thomas Jones 24-yard run (Robbie Gould kick), 13:03. Bears 21–3. **Drive: 7 plays, 62 yards, 3:43.**
- CHI – Thomas Jones 1-yard run (Robbie Gould kick), 4:11. Bears 28–3. **Drive: 1 play, 1 yard, 0:04.**

**Top passers**

- MIN – Daunte Culpepper – 26/48, 237 yards, 2 INT
- CHI – Kyle Orton – 16/25, 117 yards, 2 TD, INT

**Top rushers**

- MIN – Mewelde Moore – 14 rushes, 57 yards
- CHI – Thomas Jones – 23 rushes, 89 yards, 2 TD

**Top receivers**

- MIN – Jermaine Wiggins – 10 receptions, 68 yards
- CHI – Muhsin Muhammad – 5 receptions, 48 yards

Following a bye week marred by the "love boat" scandal, the Vikings returned to action with a trip to face the 1–3 Chicago Bears. The Vikings marched down the field on their opening drive, only to botch a fake field goal attempt from the 18-yard line. After trading several punts, the Vikings put together a 13-play drive that resulted in a 23-yard field goal by Paul Edinger, who was making his first return to Chicago, for whom he had played for the last five years. However, those were to be the Vikings' only points of the game as they failed to get any further than the Bears' 30-yard line, while Daunte Culpepper added another two interceptions to his total for the season. The Bears' offense was limited by rookie quarterback Kyle Orton, who threw for 117 yards, but did find Desmond Clark for two touchdowns. The Bears were also held to 95 yards, led by 89 yards by Thomas Jones, who did find the end zone twice in the fourth quarter to close out the game.

==== Week 7: vs. Green Bay Packers ====
Week 7: Green Bay Packers at Minnesota Vikings – Game summary

Quarter	1	2	3	4	Total
Packers	0	17	0	3	**20**
**Vikings**	0	0	10	13	**23**

at Hubert H. Humphrey Metrodome, Minneapolis, Minnesota

- Date: October 23
- Game time: 12:00 p.m. CDT
- Game weather: None (indoor stadium)
- Game attendance: 64,278
- Referee: Bill Leavy (127)
- TV announcers (FOX): Sam Rosen, Bill Maas & Jay Glazer
- Recap, Game Book

Game information

**First quarter**

- No scoring plays.

**Second quarter**

- GB – Donald Driver 22-yard pass from Brett Favre (Ryan Longwell kick), 12:11. Packers 7–0. **Drive: 8 plays, 96 yards, 4:52.**
- GB – Antonio Chatman 4-yard pass from Brett Favre (Ryan Longwell kick), 4:33. Packers 14–0. **Drive: 7 plays, 60 yards, 3:14.**
- GB – Ryan Longwell 53-yard field goal, 0:22. Packers 17–0. **Drive: 11 plays, 34 yards, 3:51.**

**Third quarter**

- MIN – Paul Edinger 27-yard field goal, 10:02. Packers 17–3. **Drive: 11 plays, 59 yards, 4:58.**
- MIN – Marcus Robinson 27-yard pass from Daunte Culpepper (Paul Edinger kick), 4:48. Packers 17–10. **Drive: 8 plays, 74 yards, 3:35.**

**Fourth quarter**

- MIN – Paul Edinger 22-yard field goal, 9:01. Packers 17–13. **Drive: 11 plays, 64 yards, 5:25.**
- MIN – Mewelde Moore 14-yard pass from Daunte Culpepper (Paul Edinger kick), 3:10. Vikings 20–17. **Drive: 9 plays, 83 yards, 4:36.**
- GB – Ryan Longwell 39-yard field goal, 0:24. Tied 20–20. **Drive: 11 plays, 56 yards, 2:46.**
- MIN – Paul Edinger 56-yard field goal, 0:00. Vikings 23–20. **Drive: 3 plays, 26 yards, 0:24.**

**Top passers**

- GB – Brett Favre – 28/36, 315 yards, 2 TD
- MIN – Daunte Culpepper – 23/31, 280 yards, 2 TD

**Top rushers**

- GB – Ahman Green – 16 rushes, 49 yards
- MIN – Mewelde Moore – 13 rushes, 45 yards

**Top receivers**

- GB – Donald Driver – 8 receptions, 114 yards, TD
- MIN – Marcus Robinson – 3 receptions, 60 yards, TD

The Vikings hosted the Packers in Week 7 with the two teams propping up the NFC North with 1–4 records. After a scoreless first quarter, Brett Favre started to find success against the Vikings defense, leading the Packers on two-second-quarter touchdown drives in a row, culminating in touchdown passes to Donald Driver and Antonio Chatman. After the Chatman touchdown, Koren Robinson returned the ensuing kickoff 72 yards to the Packers' 30-yard line, only for Mewelde Moore to fumble on the Vikings' first play from scrimmage. Favre then led the Packers downfield, and set up a 53-yard Ryan Longwell field goal as time expired in the first half, giving the Packers a 17–0 lead. The Vikings mounted a comeback in the second half; starting with a field goal on their opening drive, the Vikings defense then forced a three-and-out, before Daunte Culpepper capped the next drive with a 27-yard touchdown pass to Marcus Robinson. After a missed field goal by Longwell, Paul Edinger made a field goal of his own before Culpepper again led the Vikings down the field, finding Mewelde Moore for a 14-yard touchdown to give the Vikings a 20–17 lead with three minutes left. Favre then led the Packers down the field, resulting in a 39-yard Ryan Longwell field goal, to tie the game with 28 seconds left. Daunte Culpepper then completed back-to-back passes to Mewelde Moore and Marcus Robinson to set up a game-winning 56-yard field goal by Edinger as time expired.

==== Week 8: at Carolina Panthers ====
Week 8: Minnesota Vikings at Carolina Panthers – Game summary

Quarter	1	2	3	4	Total
Vikings	0	0	7	6	**13**
**Panthers**	7	17	7	7	**38**

at Bank of America Stadium, Charlotte, North Carolina

- Date: October 30
- Game time: 1:00 p.m. EST/12:00 p.m. CST
- Game weather: Sunny, 70 °F (21 °C)
- Game attendance: 73,502
- Referee: Scott Green (19)
- TV announcers (FOX): Curt Menefee & J.C. Pearson
- Recap, Game Book

Game information

**First quarter**

- CAR – Stephen Davis 7-yard run (John Kasay kick), 10:19. Panthers 7–0. **Drive: 9 plays, 68 yards, 4:41.**

**Second quarter**

- CAR – John Kasay 44-yard field goal, 9:45. Panthers 10–0. **Drive: 8 plays, 51 yards, 3:48.**
- CAR – Stephen Davis 1-yard run (John Kasay kick), 3:57. Panthers 17–0. **Drive: 5 plays, 80 yards, 3:06.**
- CAR – Steve Smith 13-yard pass from Jake Delhomme (John Kasay kick), 0:38. Panthers 24–0. **Drive: 10 plays, 63 yards, 1:44.**

**Third quarter**

- MIN – Mewelde Moore 4-yard run (Paul Edinger kick), 11:45. Panthers 24–7. **Drive: 7 plays, 74 yards, 3:15.**
- CAR – Kris Mangum 1-yard pass from Jake Delhomme (John Kasay kick), 7:25. Panthers 31–7. **Drive: 8 plays, 76 yards, 4:20.**

**Fourth quarter**

- CAR – Keary Colbert 25-yard pass from Jake Delhomme (John Kasay kick), 7:38. Panthers 38–7. **Drive: 13 plays, 79 yards, 8:07.**
- MIN – Marcus Robinson 5-yard pass from Brad Johnson (run failed), 1:55. Panthers 38–13. **Drive: 7 plays, 50 yards, 1:15.**

**Top passers**

- MIN – Brad Johnson – 13/28, 162 yards, TD
- CAR – Jake Delhomme – 21/30, 341 yards, 3 TD

**Top rushers**

- MIN – Mewelde Moore – 9 rushes, 30 yards, TD
- CAR – DeShaun Foster – 12 rushes, 51 yards

**Top receivers**

- MIN – Marcus Robinson – 4 receptions, 77 yards, TD
- CAR – Steve Smith – 11 receptions, 201 yards, TD

The Vikings failed to build on their come-from-behind win, falling to a 38–13 loss to the Carolina Panthers in Week 8. The Panthers received the opening kickoff and mounted a 10-play drive, resulting in a 7-yard touchdown run by Stephen Davis. On the final play of the first quarter, Daunte Culpepper tore his ACL, MCL and PCL in a low tackle by Panthers cornerback Chris Gamble following an 18-yard run. Brad Johnson replaced Culpepper at quarterback, but he was unable to prevent the Panthers from increasing their lead in the first half, going into the halftime interval with the score at 24–0. The Vikings did find the end zone twice in the second half, first with a Mewelde Moore touchdown to bring the score to 24–7, then a five-yard touchdown reception by Marcus Robinson with two minutes to go; however, the Panthers scored twice themselves to nullify the Vikings' attempted comeback. Panthers receiver Steve Smith finished the day with 11 catches for 201 yards.

==== Week 9: vs. Detroit Lions ====
Week 9: Detroit Lions at Minnesota Vikings – Game summary

Quarter	1	2	3	4	Total
Lions	0	7	0	7	**14**
**Vikings**	3	21	0	3	**27**

at Hubert H. Humphrey Metrodome, Minneapolis, Minnesota

- Date: November 6
- Game time: 12:00 p.m. CST
- Game weather: None (indoor stadium)
- Game attendance: 63,813
- Referee: Bill Vinovich (52)
- TV announcers (FOX): Curt Menefee, J.C. Pearson & Jay Glazer
- Recap, Game Book

Game information

**First quarter**

- MIN – Paul Edinger 21-yard field goal, 5:55. Vikings 3–0. **Drive: 9 plays, 57 yards, 4:53.**

**Second quarter**

- MIN – Michael Bennett 5-yard pass from Brad Johnson (Paul Edinger kick), 7:26. Vikings 10–0. **Drive: 9 plays, 44 yards, 4:22.**
- MIN – Ciatrick Fason 3-yard run (Paul Edinger kick), 5:45. Vikings 17–0. **Drive: 3 plays, 14 yards, 1:22.**
- MIN – Nate Burleson 15-yard pass from Brad Johnson (Paul Edinger kick), 4:02. Vikings 24–0. **Drive: 3 plays, 11 yards, 0:53.**
- DET – Artose Pinner 1-yard run (Jason Hanson kick), 0:48. Vikings 24–7. **Drive: 9 plays, 75 yards, 3:14.**

**Third quarter**

- No scoring plays.

**Fourth quarter**

- DET – Marcus Pollard 23-yard pass from Joey Harrington (Jason Hanson kick), 14:55. Vikings 24–14. **Drive: 6 plays, 67 yards, 2:57.**
- MIN – Paul Edinger 40-yard field goal, 7:30. Vikings 27–14. **Drive: 6 plays, 33 yards, 3:32.**

**Top passers**

- DET – Joey Harrington – 28/48, 263 yards, TD, 2 INT
- MIN – Brad Johnson – 15/22, 136 yards, 2 TD

**Top rushers**

- DET – Joey Harrington – 4 rushes, 17 yards
- MIN – Michael Bennett – 18 rushes, 106 yards

**Top receivers**

- DET – Scottie Vines – 9 receptions, 109 yards
- MIN – Travis Taylor – 4 receptions, 27 yards

With Culpepper out for the rest of the season, Brad Johnson made his first start for the Vikings since week 2 of the 1998 season. After a defensively dominated first quarter resulting in only a Vikings field goal, Johnson found Michael Bennett for a five-yard touchdown in the second quarter. Joey Harrington then fumbled on a Brian Williams sack, leading to a touchdown run by Ciatrick Fason. Harrington then compounded the Lions' problems, throwing an interception to Antoine Winfield three plays later, leading to a 15-yard touchdown pass from Johnson to Nate Burleson, giving the Vikings a 24–0 lead. The Lions added a touchdown before halftime on an Artose Pinner run. After a scoreless third quarter, Harrington found Marcus Pollard for a 23-yard touchdown on the first play of the fourth quarter, cutting the Vikings lead to 10. In an attempt to wind down the clock, the Vikings leant on their running game, rushing for 164 yards, including 106 yards by Michael Bennett. Darren Sharper sealed the victory for the Vikings, intercepting Harrington with 18 seconds left to give the Vikings their third victory of the season.

==== Week 10: at New York Giants ====
Week 10: Minnesota Vikings at New York Giants – Game summary

Quarter	1	2	3	4	Total
**Vikings**	0	7	14	3	**24**
Giants	0	6	7	8	**21**

at Giants Stadium, East Rutherford, New Jersey

- Date: November 13
- Game time: 1:00 p.m. EST/12:00 p.m. CST
- Game weather: Cloudy, 64 °F (18 °C)
- Game attendance: 78,637
- Referee: Terry McAulay (77)
- TV announcers (FOX): Kenny Albert, Brian Baldinger & Jay Glazer
- Recap, Game Book

Game information

**First quarter**

- No scoring plays.

**Second quarter**

- MIN – Darren Sharper 92-yard interception return (Paul Edinger kick), 14:43. Vikings 7–0.
- NYG – Jay Feely 35-yard field goal, 11:49. Vikings 7–3. **Drive: 6 plays, 58 yards, 2:54.**
- NYG – Jay Feely 48-yard field goal, 3:39. Vikings 7–6. **Drive: 9 plays, 49 yards, 4:31.**

**Third quarter**

- MIN – Koren Robinson 86-yard kickoff return (Paul Edinger kick), 14:49. Vikings 14–6. **Drive: 0 plays, 0 yards, 0:11.**
- NYG – Amani Toomer 23-yard pass from Eli Manning (Jay Feely kick), 11:46. Vikings 14–13. **Drive: 6 plays, 85 yards, 3:03.**
- MIN – Mewelde Moore 71-yard punt return (Paul Edinger kick), 5:27. Vikings 21–13.

**Fourth quarter**

- NYG – Tiki Barber 3-yard run (Tiki Barber run), 1:21. Tied 21–21. **Drive: 8 plays, 67 yards, 1:56.**
- MIN – Paul Edinger 48-yard field goal, 0:10. Vikings 24–21. **Drive: 8 plays, 42 yards, 1:11.**

**Top passers**

- MIN – Brad Johnson – 18/31, 144 yards
- NYG – Eli Manning – 23/48, 291 yards, TD, 4 INT

**Top rushers**

- MIN – Michael Bennett – 19 rushes, 16 yards
- NYG – Tiki Barber – 23 rushes, 95 yards, TD

**Top receivers**

- MIN – Koren Robinson – 1 reception, 44 yards
- NYG – Tiki Barber – 8 receptions, 111 yards

In Week 10, the Vikings traveled to the Meadowlands seeking consecutive victories for the first time in the season against the 6–2 New York Giants. The Vikings were unable to capitalize on a fumble by Willie Ponder on the opening kickoff, as Paul Edinger missed a 40-yard field goal after the Vikings failed to earn a first down. After trading punts, Eli Manning was intercepted by Darren Sharper, only for Edinger to have a 32-yard field goal attempt blocked on the ensuing possession. After the scoreless first quarter, Sharper intercepted Manning a second time, this time returning it 92 yards for his second touchdown of the season. The Vikings offense was unable to add to the scoreboard in the first half, and a pair of field goals from Jay Feely meant the Vikings went into the halftime break with a 7–6 lead. To start the second half, Koren Robinson returned the opening kickoff 86 yards for a touchdown, giving the Vikings a 14–6 lead. The Giants responded immediately, with Manning finding Amani Toomer for a 23-yard touchdown pass to again reduce the Vikings' lead to a single point. The Vikings punted on their next possession, before forcing the Giants to do the same, with Mewelde Moore returning Jeff Feagles' kick 71 yards to give the Vikings a 21–13 lead; the score made the Vikings the first team in NFL history to return an interception, kickoff and punt for a touchdown in the same game. Manning was intercepted two more times, including a third for Sharper; however, a non-existent Vikings offense (including 12 yards rushing on 21 carries) meant the Giants still had a chance. Following the two-minute warning, Manning put together a drive in which he completed 5 out of 7 pass attempts, leading to a three-yard touchdown run by Tiki Barber; Barber then ran in the two-point conversion to tie the scores. With 1:21 left, Johnson was sacked by Osi Umenyiora on the first play of the ensuing drive. After a Giants timeout trying to get the ball back, Johnson completed passes to Jermaine Wiggins, Marcus Robinson and Travis Taylor to set up Paul Edinger's 48-yard game-winning field goal, giving the Vikings consecutive wins for the first time in 2005.

==== Week 11: at Green Bay Packers ====
Week 11: Minnesota Vikings at Green Bay Packers – Game summary

Quarter	1	2	3	4	Total
**Vikings**	0	7	7	6	**20**
Packers	7	7	0	3	**17**

at Lambeau Field, Green Bay, Wisconsin

- Date: November 21
- Game time: 8:00 p.m. CST
- Game weather: Cold, 36 °F (2 °C)
- Game attendance: 70,610
- Referee: Walt Anderson (66)
- TV announcers (ABC): Al Michaels, John Madden & Sam Ryan
- Recap, Game Book

Game information

**First quarter**

- GB – Donald Driver 15-yard pass from Brett Favre (Ryan Longwell kick), 2:16. Packers 7–0. **Drive: 7 plays, 61 yards, 4:21.**

**Second quarter**

- MIN – Dovonte Edwards 51-yard interception return (Paul Edinger kick), 1:04. Tied 7–7.
- GB – Donald Driver 53-yard pass from Brett Favre (Ryan Longwell kick), 0:26. Packers 14–7. **Drive: 3 plays, 64 yards, 0:38.**

**Third quarter**

- MIN – Ciatrick Fason 1-yard run (Paul Edinger kick), 0:46. Tied 14–14. **Drive: 13 plays, 88 yards, 8:33.**

**Fourth quarter**

- MIN – Paul Edinger 24-yard field goal, 10:13. Vikings 17–14. **Drive: 8 plays, 62 yards, 3:22.**
- GB – Ryan Longwell 46-yard field goal, 3:03. Tied 17–17. **Drive: 9 plays, 39 yards, 1:46.**
- MIN – Paul Edinger 27-yard field goal, 0:00. Vikings 20–17. **Drive: 9 plays, 58 yards, 3:03.**

**Top passers**

- MIN – Brad Johnson – 18/30, 196 yards, INT
- GB – Brett Favre – 20/33, 227 yards, 2 TD, 2 INT

**Top rushers**

- MIN – Mewelde Moore – 22 rushes, 122 yards
- GB – Tony Fisher – 4 rushes, 14 yards

**Top receivers**

- MIN – Jermaine Wiggins – 7 receptions, 67 yards
- GB – Donald Driver – 5 receptions, 84 yards, 2 TD

The Vikings were again on the road in Week 11, traveling to Green Bay for a Monday night contest against the 2–7 Packers, as the Vikings attempted to get back to .500 and reignite their hopes of making the playoffs; however, the Vikings fell behind in the first quarter with Brett Favre finding Donald Driver for a 15-yard touchdown. The Vikings leveled the scores late in the second quarter, with Dovonte Edwards returning an interception 51 yards for a touchdown, only for Favre to throw another touchdown pass to Driver, hitting him on a 53-yard touchdown with 28 seconds remaining, to give the Packers a 14–7 halftime lead. Late in the third quarter, the Vikings snapped a streak of eight consecutive quarters without an offensive touchdown, tying the game on a 1-yard touchdown by Ciatrick Fason at the end of a 14-play drive. A fourth-quarter Edinger field goal gave the Vikings the lead for the first time in the game, only to be matched by a Longwell field goal with three minutes remaining. The Packers then attempted a short kickoff to avoid a big return by Koren Robinson, only to give the Vikings strong field position. Mewelde Moore ran three times for 18 yards on the drive, giving him 122 yards for the game. Brad Johnson then found Robinson for 35 yards, bringing the Vikings to the Packers' 6-yard line. After three kneeldowns by Brad Johnson to run down the clock, Edinger connected on a 27-yard field goal as time expired, giving the Vikings their third consecutive victory.

==== Week 12: vs. Cleveland Browns ====
Week 12: Cleveland Browns at Minnesota Vikings – Game summary

Quarter	1	2	3	4	Total
Browns	0	3	3	6	**12**
**Vikings**	3	7	7	7	**24**

at Hubert H. Humphrey Metrodome, Minneapolis, Minnesota

- Date: November 27
- Game time: 12:00 p.m. CST
- Game weather: None (indoor stadium)
- Game attendance: 63,814
- Referee: Tony Corrente (99)
- TV announcers (CBS): Bill Macatee & Rich Baldinger
- Recap, Game Book

Game information

**First quarter**

- MIN – Paul Edinger 43-yard field goal, 7:58. Vikings 3–0. **Drive: 12 plays, 41 yards, 7:02.**

**Second quarter**

- MIN – Marcus Robinson 15-yard pass from Brad Johnson (Paul Edinger kick), 4:22. Vikings 10–0. **Drive: 3 plays, 35 yards, 1:01.**
- CLE – Phil Dawson 32-yard field goal, 0:04. Vikings 10–3. **Drive: 10 plays, 63 yards, 4:18.**

**Third quarter**

- MIN – Marcus Robinson 15-yard pass from Brad Johnson (Paul Edinger kick), 7:24. Vikings 17–3. **Drive: 4 plays, 17 yards, 2:11.**
- CLE – Phil Dawson 38-yard field goal, 3:27. Vikings 17–6. **Drive: 7 plays, 31 yards, 3:57.**

**Fourth quarter**

- MIN – Marcus Robinson 2-yard pass from Brad Johnson (Paul Edinger kick), 8:47. Vikings 24–6. **Drive: 4 plays, 32 yards, 1:52.**
- CLE – Dennis Northcutt 9-yard pass from Trent Dilfer (run failed), 1:06. Vikings 24–12. **Drive: 10 plays, 52 yards, 2:00.**

**Top passers**

- CLE – Trent Dilfer – 23/35, 214 yards, TD, 2 INT
- MIN – Brad Johnson – 19/28, 207 yards, 3 TD, INT

**Top rushers**

- CLE – Reuben Droughns – 19 rushes, 73 yards
- MIN – Mewelde Moore – 21 rushes, 67 yards

**Top receivers**

- CLE – Steve Heiden – 5 receptions, 55 yards
- MIN – Travis Taylor – 5 receptions, 70 yards

The Vikings returned home in Week 12 to face the 4–6 Cleveland Browns, seeking their fourth straight victory, and a return to a winning record. Brad Johnson recorded his best game of the season so far, throwing for 207 yards and three touchdowns, all to Marcus Robinson, while Mewelde Moore added a further 67 yards rushing. Defensively, Darren Sharper intercepted both Browns quarterbacks, Trent Dilfer and Charlie Frye, while Antoine Winfield also picked off Dilfer. The Vikings also sacked Dilfer five times, and held Cleveland to 78 yards rushing. The Browns did find the end zone with one minute remaining, with Dennis Northcutt catching a 9-yard touchdown pass from Dilfer.

==== Week 13: at Detroit Lions ====
Week 13: Minnesota Vikings at Detroit Lions – Game summary

Quarter	1	2	3	4	Total
**Vikings**	7	7	7	0	**21**
Lions	3	3	3	7	**16**

at Ford Field, Detroit, Michigan

- Date: December 4
- Game time: 1:00 p.m. EST/12:00 p.m. CST
- Game weather: None (indoor stadium)
- Game attendance: 61,375
- Referee: Tom White (123)
- TV announcers (FOX): Curt Menefee & J.C. Pearson
- Recap, Game Book

Game information

**First quarter**

- DET – Jason Hanson 45-yard field goal, 8:06. Lions 3–0. **Drive: 13 plays, 35 yards, 6:54.**
- MIN – Koren Robinson 80-yard pass from Brad Johnson (Paul Edinger kick), 7:56. Vikings 7–3. **Drive: 1 play, 80 yards, 0:10.**

**Second quarter**

- MIN – Michael Bennett 7-yard run (Paul Edinger kick), 13:53. Vikings 14–3. **Drive: 5 plays, 68 yards, 2:12.**
- DET – Jason Hanson 26-yard field goal, 0:08. Vikings 14–6. **Drive: 5 plays, 10 yards, 0:28.**

**Third quarter**

- MIN – Michael Bennett 5-yard pass from Brad Johnson (Paul Edinger kick), 10:45. Vikings 21–6. **Drive: 9 plays, 64 yards, 4:15.**
- DET – Jason Hanson 28-yard field goal, 1:51. Vikings 21–9. **Drive: 8 plays, 71 yards, 3:34.**

**Fourth quarter**

- DET – Artose Pinner 6-yard run (Jason Hanson kick), 7:38. Vikings 21–16. **Drive: 10 plays, 73 yards, 5:50.**

**Top passers**

- MIN – Brad Johnson – 17/23, 256 yards, 2 TD
- DET – Jeff Garcia – 17/35, 126 yards, INT

**Top rushers**

- MIN – Michael Bennett – 22 rushes, 79 yards, TD
- DET – Artose Pinner – 14 rushes, 64 yards, TD

**Top receivers**

- MIN – Koren Robinson – 4 receptions, 148 yards, TD
- DET – Artose Pinner – 3 receptions, 39 yards

The Vikings headed to Detroit in Week 13 seeking their fifth straight win, and an opportunity to firmly entrench themselves in the playoff race against the 4–7 Lions. The Vikings completely shut down Jeff Garcia and the Lions passing attack, holding him to 17 completions on 35 attempts for 126 yards. Offensively, Brad Johnson bettered his performance from the previous week against the Browns, completing 17 of 23 passes for 256 yards and two touchdowns, including an 80-yard touchdown pass to Koren Robinson in the first quarter. Michael Bennett also had a strong game, scoring touchdowns in the second and third quarters, finishing with 89 scrimmage yards. The Lions finally scored a touchdown in the fourth quarter, as an Artose Pinner rushing touchdown brought them to within five points with 7:42 remaining. After the Lions forced a Vikings punt, Corey Chavous intercepted Jeff Garcia on the goal line with a minute remaining, securing the Vikings fifth consecutive victory.

==== Week 14: vs. St. Louis Rams ====
Week 14: St. Louis Rams at Minnesota Vikings – Game summary

Quarter	1	2	3	4	Total
Rams	0	6	7	0	**13**
**Vikings**	7	6	14	0	**27**

at Hubert H. Humphrey Metrodome, Minneapolis, Minnesota

- Date: December 11
- Game time: 12:00 p.m. CST
- Game weather: None (indoor stadium)
- Game attendance: 64,005
- Referee: Larry Nemmers (20)
- TV announcers (FOX): Kenny Albert & Brian Baldinger
- Recap, Game Book

Game information

**First quarter**

- MIN – Koren Robinson 13-yard run (Paul Edinger kick), 5:36. Vikings 7–0. **Drive: 8 plays, 80 yards, 4:22.**

**Second quarter**

- STL – Jeff Wilkins 51-yard field goal, 6:54. Vikings 7–3. **Drive: 7 plays, 19 yards, 2:38.**
- MIN – Paul Edinger 37-yard field goal, 4:52. Vikings 10–3. **Drive: 5 plays, 20 yards, 2:02.**
- MIN – Paul Edinger 44-yard field goal, 0:59. Vikings 13–3. **Drive: 4 plays, 2 yards, 0:19.**
- STL – Jeff Wilkins 23-yard field goal, 0:00. Vikings 13–6. **Drive: 5 plays, 70 yards, 0:59.**

**Third quarter**

- STL – Ryan Fitzpatrick 14-yard run (Jeff Wilkins kick), 10:42. Tied 13–13. **Drive: 6 plays, 49 yards, 2:38.**
- MIN – Michael Bennett 7-yard run (Paul Edinger kick), 8:05. Vikings 20–13. **Drive: 5 plays, 80 yards, 2:37.**
- MIN – Ciatrick Fason 1-yard run (Paul Edinger kick), 3:11. Vikings 27–13. **Drive: 4 plays, 21 yards, 1:50.**

**Fourth quarter**

- No scoring plays.

**Top passers**

- STL – Ryan Fitzpatrick – 26/45, 235 yards, 5 INT
- MIN – Brad Johnson – 16/25, 146 yards

**Top rushers**

- STL – Steven Jackson – 19 rushes, 67 yards
- MIN – Michael Bennett – 18 rushes, 70 yards, TD

**Top receivers**

- STL – Torry Holt – 10 receptions, 95 yards
- MIN – Marcus Robinson – 1 reception, 49 yards

The Vikings returned home again in Week 14 to face a St. Louis Rams team quarterbacked by rookie Ryan Fitzpatrick making his second career start. The Vikings opened the scoring with a 13-yard end-around by Koren Robinson. Both teams added a pair of field goals each in the second quarter, resulting in the Vikings taking a 13–6 lead into the locker at halftime. The Rams capped their opening drive of the second half with a 14-yard touchdown run from Fitzpatrick to tie the contest. The Vikings responded with a long pass from Brad Johnson to Marcus Robinson, setting up a 7-yard touchdown run by Michael Bennett. Fitzpatrick then threw five interceptions to four different Vikings (Brian Williams (2), Darren Sharper, Fred Smoot, and Antoine Winfield), as the Vikings increased their lead to 14 points on a touchdown run from Ciatrick Fason. There were no further points in the fourth quarter, with the Vikings holding on despite Johnson only throwing for 146 yards, to give them an 8–5 record on the season.

==== Week 15: vs. Pittsburgh Steelers ====
Week 15: Pittsburgh Steelers at Minnesota Vikings – Game summary

Quarter	1	2	3	4	Total
**Steelers**	3	7	6	2	**18**
Vikings	3	0	0	0	**3**

at Hubert H. Humphrey Metrodome, Minneapolis, Minnesota

- Date: December 18
- Game time: 12:00 p.m. CST
- Game weather: None (indoor stadium)
- Game attendance: 64,136
- Referee: Ed Hochuli (85)
- TV announcers (CBS): Kevin Harlan & Randy Cross
- Recap, Game Book

Game information

**First quarter**

- PIT – Jeff Reed 21-yard field goal, 11:07. Steelers 3–0. **Drive: 7 plays, 72 yards, 3:53.**
- MIN – Paul Edinger 20-yard field goal, 1:59. Tied 3–3. **Drive: 4 plays, 1 yard, 1:26.**

**Second quarter**

- PIT – Ben Roethlisberger 3-yard run (Jeff Reed kick), 3:30. Steelers 10–3. **Drive: 6 plays, 14 yards, 3:12.**

**Third quarter**

- PIT – Jeff Reed 41-yard field goal, 3:49. Steelers 13–3. **Drive: 9 plays, 63 yards, 6:11.**
- PIT – Jeff Reed 26-yard field goal, 0:36. Steelers 16–3. **Drive: 5 plays, 21 yards, 3:13.**

**Fourth quarter**

- PIT – Michael Bennett tackled in the end zone by Larry Foote and Joey Porter for a safety, 11:45. Steelers 18–3.

**Top passers**

- PIT – Ben Roethlisberger – 10/15, 149 yards
- MIN – Brad Johnson – 16/30, 143 yards, 2 INT

**Top rushers**

- PIT – Willie Parker – 14 rushes, 81 yards
- MIN – Michael Bennett – 11 rushes, 43 yards

**Top receivers**

- PIT – Heath Miller – 2 receptions, 58 yards
- MIN – Marcus Robinson – 2 receptions, 38 yards

The Vikings hosted the Pittsburgh Steelers in Week 15. With both teams holding an 8–5 record, victory was essential for their playoff chances. The Vikings had a strong defense and only allowed a 21-yard field goal by Jeff Reed on the Steelers' first possession; however, the offense struggled and had to be content with tying the scores with a Paul Edinger field goal late in the first quarter. Brad Johnson struggled in particular, and was intercepted by both Joey Porter and Deshea Townsend in the first half. Ben Roethlisberger scored the game's only touchdown towards the end of the second quarter, running in from three yards. Johnson failed to complete a pass in the second half, and the Vikings' only first down came via a penalty. Reed added two more field goals for the Steelers in the third quarter, and rounded out the game's scoring with a fourth-quarter safety after tackling Michael Bennett in the end zone. The loss put the Vikings at 8–6 and on the brink of playoff elimination.

==== Week 16: at Baltimore Ravens ====
Week 16: Minnesota Vikings at Baltimore Ravens – Game summary

Quarter	1	2	3	4	Total
Vikings	7	7	6	3	**23**
**Ravens**	7	3	7	13	**30**

at M&T Bank Stadium, Baltimore, Maryland

- Date: December 25
- Game time: 8:30 p.m. EST/7:30 p.m. CST
- Game weather: Cold, 43 °F (6 °C)
- Game attendance: 70,246
- Referee: Gerry Austin (34)
- TV announcers (ESPN): Mike Patrick, Joe Theismann, Paul Maguire & Suzy Kolber
- Recap, [ Game Book]

Game information

**First quarter**

- MIN – Travis Taylor 13-yard pass from Brad Johnson (Paul Edinger kick), 11:01. Vikings 7–0. **Drive: 7 plays, 64 yards, 3:59.**
- BAL – Todd Heap 6-yard pass from Kyle Boller (Matt Stover kick), 1:35. Tied 7–7. **Drive: 17 plays, 73 yards, 9:26.**

**Second quarter**

- MIN – Jermaine Wiggins 5-yard pass from Brad Johnson (Paul Edinger kick), 1:06. Vikings 14–7. **Drive: 10 plays, 80 yards, 5:57.**
- BAL – Matt Stover 37-yard field goal, 0:00. Vikings 14–10. **Drive: 9 plays, 56 yards, 1:06.**

**Third quarter**

- MIN – Paul Edinger 36-yard field goal, 13:29. Vikings 17–10. **Drive: 4 plays, 8 yards, 1:23.**
- BAL – Mark Clayton 47-yard pass from Kyle Boller (Matt Stover kick), 9:49. Tied 17–17. **Drive: 6 plays, 75 yards, 3:40.**
- MIN – Paul Edinger 40-yard field goal, 4:14. Vikings 20–17. **Drive: 11 plays, 33 yards, 5:35.**

**Fourth quarter**

- BAL – Derrick Mason 39-yard pass from Kyle Boller (Matt Stover kick), 14:47. Ravens 24–20. **Drive: 11 plays, 79 yards, 4:27.**
- BAL – Matt Stover 38-yard field goal, 1:55. Ravens 27–20. **Drive: 11 plays, 68 yards, 6:12.**
- BAL – Matt Stover 19-yard field goal, 1:03. Ravens 30–20. **Drive: 4 plays, 9 yards, 0:28.**
- MIN – Paul Edinger 46-yard field goal, 0:15. Ravens 30–23. **Drive: 7 plays, 32 yards, 0:48.**

**Top passers**

- MIN – Brad Johnson – 25/36, 248 yards, 2 TD
- BAL – Kyle Boller – 24/34, 289 yards, 3 TD, INT

**Top rushers**

- MIN – Mewelde Moore – 10 rushes, 49 yards
- BAL – Jamal Lewis – 24 rushes, 74 yards

**Top receivers**

- MIN – Troy Williamson – 1 reception, 56 yards
- BAL – Derrick Mason – 9 receptions, 103 yards, TD

In Week 16, the Vikings traveled to Baltimore for a Christmas night game in the knowledge that a loss would eliminate them from playoff contention. Brad Johnson recovered from his poor performance against the Steelers and led the Vikings to a touchdown on their opening drive, finding Travis Taylor on a 13-yard pass for the score. Kyle Boller responded for the Ravens, leading them on a 17-play drive that culminated with a 6-yard touchdown reception for Todd Heap. It took until late in the second quarter for the next points to arrive, with Johnson finding Jermaine Wiggins in the end zone on a 5-yard pass with 1:06 remaining in the half; however, Matt Stover cut the Vikings' lead to 14–10 going into the half with a 37-yard field goal as time expired. The Vikings opened the second half with a 36-yard field goal from Paul Edinger, only for the Ravens to score with passes of 47 yards and 39 yards to Mark Clayton and Derrick Mason respectively, either side of another Edinger field goal to leave the Vikings trailing 24–20 with 14:47 remaining in the game. The Ravens' defense forced two consecutive punts and a Brad Johnson fumble, which resulted in two field goals by Stover to give the Ravens a 30–20 lead with just over a minute to play. Edinger cut the Ravens' lead to 7 points with 15 seconds remaining, but the Ravens recovered the ensuing onside kick, giving the Ravens the win, and eliminating the Vikings from the playoffs.

==== Week 17: vs. Chicago Bears ====
Week 17: Chicago Bears at Minnesota Vikings – Game summary

Quarter	1	2	3	4	Total
Bears	3	0	0	7	**10**
**Vikings**	0	17	7	10	**34**

at Hubert H. Humphrey Metrodome, Minneapolis, Minnesota

- Date: January 1
- Game time: 3:15 p.m. CST
- Game weather: None (indoor stadium)
- Game attendance: 64,023
- Referee: Mike Carey (94)
- TV announcers (FOX): Dick Stockton, Daryl Johnston & Tony Siragusa
- Recap, Game Book

Game information

**First quarter**

- CHI – Robbie Gould 22-yard field goal, 5:14. Bears 3–0. **Drive: 13 plays, 63 yards, 7:26.**

**Second quarter**

- MIN – Paul Edinger 54-yard field goal, 14:53. Tied 3–3. **Drive: 5 plays, 19 yards, 0:54.**
- MIN – Ciatrick Fason 2-yard run (Paul Edinger kick), 7:37. Vikings 10–3. **Drive: 8 plays, 90 yards, 4:38.**
- MIN – Travis Taylor 17-yard pass from Brad Johnson (Paul Edinger kick), 0:03. Vikings 17–3. **Drive: 10 plays, 69 yards, 1:45.**

**Third quarter**

- MIN – Mewelde Moore 7-yard pass from Brad Johnson (Paul Edinger kick), 3:58. Vikings 24–3. **Drive: 15 plays, 82 yards, 8:28.**

**Fourth quarter**

- MIN – Paul Edinger 27-yard field goal, 14:52. Vikings 27–3. **Drive: 4 plays, −1 yard, 1:06.**
- CHI – Justin Gage 4-yard pass from Jeff Blake (Robbie Gould kick), 7:08. Vikings 27–10. **Drive: 13 plays, 59 yards, 7:44.**
- MIN – Michael Bennett 61-yard run (Paul Edinger kick), 5:10. Vikings 34–10. **Drive: 3 plays, 80 yards, 1:58.**

**Top passers**

- CHI – Kyle Orton – 6/14, 59 yards
- MIN – Brad Johnson – 27/40, 247 yards, 2 TD

**Top rushers**

- CHI – Thomas Jones – 12 rushes, 62 yards
- MIN – Michael Bennett – 6 rushes, 82 yards, TD

**Top receivers**

- CHI – Justin Gage – 6 receptions, 67 yards, TD
- MIN – Travis Taylor – 5 receptions, 68 yards, TD

With the Vikings now out of the playoff race, they returned home for the final game of the season against the division champion Chicago Bears, who would go into the playoffs as the NFC's #2 seed. The Bears rested their now-healthy starting quarterback Rex Grossman, with Kyle Orton under center. Orton and running back Thomas Jones led the Bears to a field goal to start the scoring, before most prominent Bears players were removed from the game at the end of the first quarter. With the Bears defense now missing the likes of Brian Urlacher, Lance Briggs and Charles Tillman, the Vikings scored 17 points in the second quarter, starting with a 54-yard Paul Edinger field goal, followed by a 2-yard run by Ciatrick Fason and a 17-yard pass from Brad Johnson to Travis Taylor. Johnson threw for 247 yards and two touchdowns in the game, with Mewelde Moore adding 101 yards from scrimmage. Moore added another touchdown for the Vikings late in the third quarter, followed by another Edinger field goal from 27 yards to start the fourth. The Bears found the end zone in the fourth quarter on a 4-yard touchdown pass from Jeff Blake to Justin Gage. The Vikings then capped the scoring with a 61-yard touchdown run from Michael Bennett, giving Minnesota a 34–10 win, securing a winning season for the Vikings. Defensively, the Vikings held the Bears to 97 yards passing, with Kevin Williams recording two sacks. Despite the team finishing with a winning record, owner Zygi Wilf announced the dismissal of head coach Mike Tice only a few hours after the game.

=== Standings ===
NFC North
	W	L	T	PCT	DIV	CONF	PF	PA	STK
^{(2)} Chicago Bears	11	5	0	.688	5–1	10–2	260	202	L1
Minnesota Vikings	9	7	0	.563	5–1	8–4	306	344	W1
Detroit Lions	5	11	0	.313	1–5	3–9	254	345	L1
Green Bay Packers	4	12	0	.250	1–5	4–8	298	344	W1

== Statistics ==
=== Team leaders ===
Category	Player(s)	Value
Passing yards	Brad Johnson	1,885
Passing touchdowns	Brad Johnson	12
Rushing yards	Mewelde Moore	662
Rushing touchdowns	Ciatrick Fason	4
Receiving yards	Travis Taylor	604
Receiving touchdowns	Marcus Robinson	5
Points	Paul Edinger	106
Kickoff return yards	Koren Robinson	1221
Punt return yards	Mewelde Moore	245
Tackles	Antoine Winfield	98
Sacks	Lance Johnstone	7.5
Interceptions	Darren Sharper	9
Forced fumbles	Brian Williams; Richard Owens	2

=== League rankings ===
Category	Total yards	Yards per game	NFL rank (out of 32)
Passing offense	3,146	196.6	20th
Rushing offense	1,467	91.7	27th
Total offense	4,613	288.3	25th
Passing defense	3,332	208.2	22nd
Rushing defense	1,841	115.1	19th
Total defense	5,173	323.3	21st
