= Minnesota Vikings boat party scandal =

Alleged sex party

On October 6, 2005, an alleged sex party occurred on Lake Minnetonka with seventeen members of the Minnesota Vikings football team including Daunte Culpepper, Fred Smoot, Mewelde Moore, Pat Williams, Bryant McKinnie, Nate Burleson, Ralph Brown, Troy Williamson, Travis Taylor, Kevin Williams, Lance Johnstone, Moe Williams, and Willie Offord. Two houseboats were rented and some, but not all, of the players performed sexual acts in front of crew members. Sex workers from Atlanta and Florida were flown in for the party. There were at least ninety people on the two boats, and Smoot later estimated that there were 100 women present. An anonymous former player of the Vikings claimed that this is not the first time that such an incident had happened.

Allegedly, photographs were taken at the party showing people engaging in sexual intercourse. Four of the players—Culpepper, Smoot, McKinnie, and Moe Williams—were charged with misdemeanors related to the events. Later commentators pointed to the scandal as a key event in the history of the team, leading to the firing of head coach Mike Tice, who was replaced by Brad Childress.

== Incident ==
A woman called police around 9:20 p.m. on October 6 to report that approximately "seven black men" had urinated in her yard after exiting a "big shuttle bus limousine", according to the transcript.

The woman later mentioned that the men were "sitting at Al and Alma's", the name of the charter cruise company that the Vikings players were later alleged to have used for the party.

Stephen Doyle, attorney for the charter company, said some of the sex acts alleged by witnesses to have taken place during the party included "masturbation, oral sex, anal sex, man on man, woman on woman, toys, double penetration, middle of the floor, middle of the couches, middle of the room."

The cleaning crew reported finding "used condoms, K-Y Jelly, Handi Wipes, wrappers for sex toys" and said "it was just incredible how it was left. Never in the history of this group of people have they ever had anything like this."

According to Doyle, there were no drugs and no minors on the two boats and that not every Vikings player aboard acted inappropriately.

== Parties involved ==
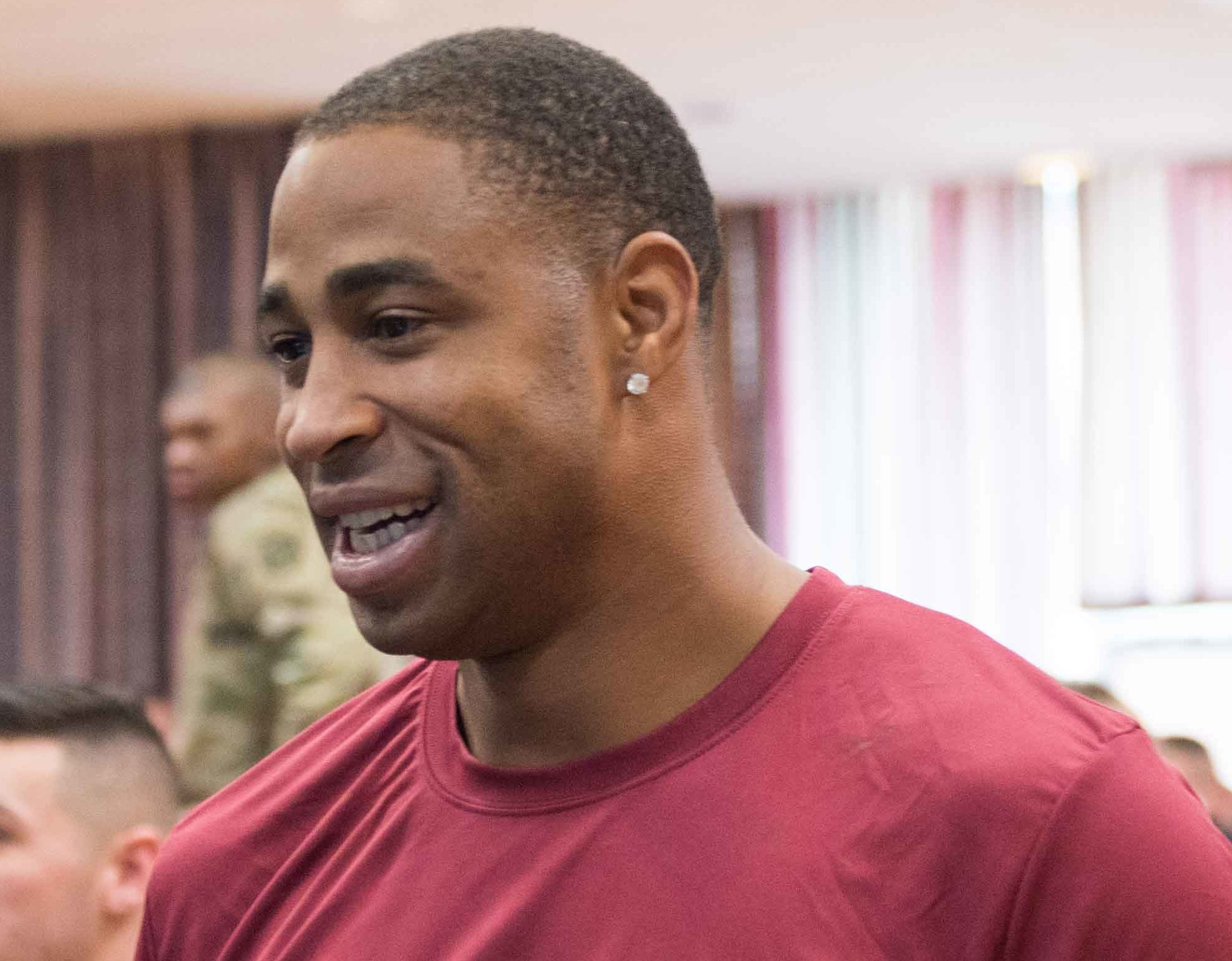
Fred Smoot in 2017

=== Fred Smoot ===
Smoot was the alleged ringleader of the entire operation. He is said to have been the one who hired the boats for the cruise on Lake Minnetonka. Smoot's agent has dismissed these claims. Smoot, however has not denied that he was on the boat that night. Smoot allegedly held a double-headed dildo and inserted it into the vaginas of two women who were lying on the floor in the lounge area. After one woman left he continued to "manipulate the dildo" inside the other woman in front of the crew.

Merritt Geyen, who worked at the docks, told a sheriff's detective that three men planned the charter boat cruises. The day before the party, Geyen told the detective that Smoot showed up with another man she did not recognize.

=== Lance Johnstone ===
Merritt Geyen, a dock employee, told the detective that crew members showed Johnstone, Smoot and an unidentified player around the boats, went over menus and talked about specialty liquors. Smoot then signed a contract for the event and gave his address and phone number so she could bill him for it. Johnstone put his credit card down for the $1,000 deposit and said the rest of the bill could be added to his card later.

=== Mewelde Moore ===
Moore admitted being on the boat, but he claimed that "nothing happened". Asked if he saw strippers or sex on his boat, Moore quickly replied: "Sex? What are you talking about? Is that what – man, that's crazy. Sex? Come on. Look man, I'm engaged so... none of that. Thing about that... that – that put me in trouble."

=== Koren Robinson ===
Koren Robinson claimed he was not on either boat and was upset the Minneapolis Star Tribune associated him with this incident, given his effort to rebuild his life after struggling with substance abuse.

Robinson says "I wasn't there, as far as the whole situation, I just know I wasn't on the boat, and I don't want to get involved. I don't want my name brought up because of what I just went through and what I'm still going through. So for my name to be brought up like that is just crazy and upsetting, because I don't want anyone looking at me because I had nothing to do with it."

=== Bryant McKinnie ===
McKinnie allegedly picked up a naked woman, placed her on the bar and performed cunnilingus on her in front of the crew and other guests. In a June 2013 Reddit Ask Me Anything thread, Fred Smoot referred to this act as "runnin through the okra patch". Later that evening McKinnie and three other men were spotted sitting in deck chairs receiving fellatio from four women, which was also observed by the crew in a public area of the boat.

=== Zygi Wilf ===
In response to the events of the scandal becoming public, Vikings owner Zygi Wilf stated that "Lack of discipline will no longer be tolerated at any level. The events of the past week are unacceptable. If there was any sense that we would look the other way regarding this type of behavior, I want to make it extremely clear that this behavior will never be tolerated again."

== See also ==
- NFL player conduct policy
- Louisville basketball sex scandal
- List of organizational conflicts in the NFL
