= C. J. Mosley (defensive lineman) =

American football player (born 1983)

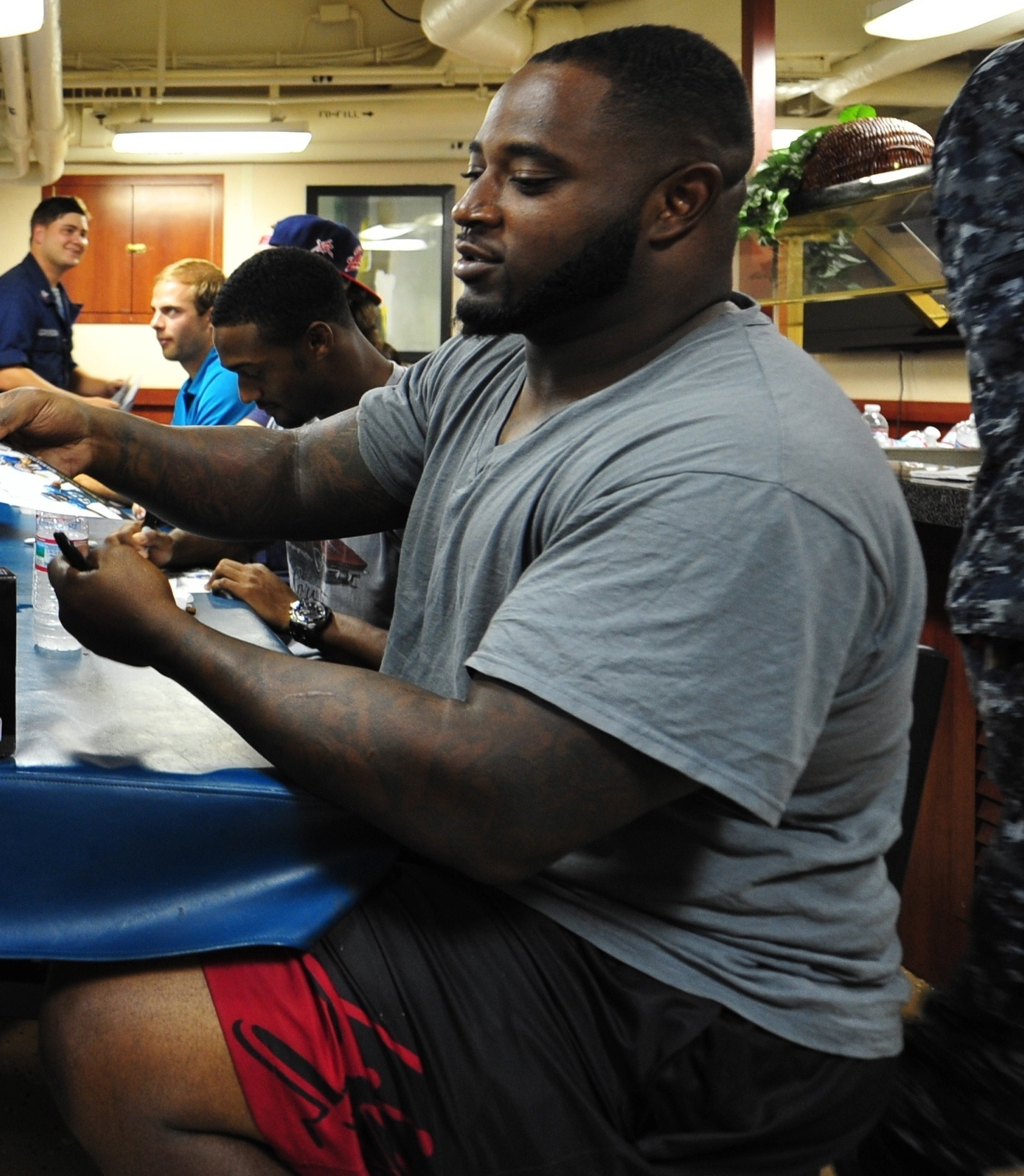
- Mosley in 2012

No. 96, 75, 95, 69, 90, 99, 94
- Position: Defensive tackle

Personal information
- Born: August 6, 1983 (age 43); Fort Knox, Kentucky, U.S.
- Listed height: 6 ft 2 in (1.88 m)
- Listed weight: 315 lb (143 kg)

Career information
- High school: Waynesville (Waynesville, Missouri)
- College: Missouri
- NFL draft: 2005: 6th round, 191st overall pick

Career history
- Minnesota Vikings (2005); New York Jets (2006–2008); Cleveland Browns (2009); Jacksonville Jaguars (2010–2012); Detroit Lions (2013–2014); Miami Dolphins (2015)

Awards and highlights
- First-team All-Big 12 (2004); Second-team All-Big 12 (2003)

Career NFL statistics
- Total tackles: 195
- Sacks: 14.0
- Forced fumbles: 6
- Fumble recoveries: 4
- Stats at Pro Football Reference

Calvin Michael Mosley Jr. (born August 6, 1983) is an American former professional football player who was a defensive tackle in the National Football League (NFL). He was selected by the Minnesota Vikings in the sixth round of the 2005 NFL draft. He played college football for the Missouri Tigers. He also played for the New York Jets, Cleveland Browns, Jacksonville Jaguars, Detroit Lions and Miami Dolphins.

== Early life ==
Mosley was born in Fort Knox, Kentucky, and earned All-State honors at Waynesville High School in Waynesville, Missouri, and was ranked among the top defensive tackle prospects by Rivals.com. He was a three-time All-District selection posted 21.0 sacks and 267 tackles during his career, and recorded 97 tackles and 10 sacks as a senior. He also finished 3rd in the shot put at the Missouri state track meet as a senior.

== College career ==
After being redshirted at the University of Missouri in 2001, he earned Freshman All-America honorable mention honors from College Football News in 2002. He played in every game with 5 starts at nose guard and posted 39 tackles, 3 sacks, 8 tackles for loss, and a forced fumble. He began his collegiate career with 3 tackles, and 2 tackles for loss at Illinois and had 8 tackles and added a sack and 2 tackles for loss vs. Colorado. He also recorded a season-high 9 tackles and made a sack and 3 tackles for loss at Texas A&M.

In 2003, he earned 2nd-team All-Big 12 honors from the league's coaches and was named the team's Defensive Lineman of the Year. That season, he started 11 games at nose guard and ranked among the nation's leaders with 16 tackles for loss on the year. He also was 2nd on the team with 7 QB hurries and 6.0 sacks. He registered 7 tackles, 4 tackles for loss, and 2.0 sacks in season opener vs. Illinois, and had 3 tackles and a sack vs. Eastern Illinois. He came off the bench to record 8 tackles, a sack that knocked QB Bill Whittmore out of the game, and added 2 tackles for loss at Kansas. Against Texas A&M, he made 9 tackles and also had 2 sacks and 3 tackles for loss. In the Independence Bowl vs. Arkansas, he registered 4 tackles and a tackle for loss.

In 2004, Mosley earned Associated Press 1st-team All-Big 12 honors and was named the team's Defensive Lineman of the Year. That year, he started all 11 games at RDT, and led a defense that finished 2nd in the conference and 14th nationally in total yardage allowed. He made 61 tackles, 6.5 sacks, 14 tackles for loss, as well as recovering 2 fumbles, forced another, and blocked a kick. He opened the season with 8 tackles, 3 QB hurries, a sack, and 3 tackles for loss vs. Arkansas State. The following week at Troy, he posted 8 tackles, 2.0 sacks, and 3 tackles for loss. Versus Colorado, he recorded 5 tackles, a sack, and 3 tackles for loss. He registered 8 tackles and a fumble recovery at Texas, and had 5 tackles, a sack, and a forced fumble vs. Oklahoma State. He blocked a kick and added a fumble recovery and 4 tackles vs. Kansas State. C.J. finished his career with 4 tackles and a sack at Iowa State.

Mosley started 27 of 36 games he played in during his 3 years with the Tigers. He recorded 167 tackles with 15.5 sacks, 38 tackles for loss, and 22 QB hurries. He was part of a defense in 2004 that ranked 2nd in the Big 12 and 14th nationally in total yardage allowed and was twice named the team's Defensive Lineman of the Year.

== Professional career ==
Pre-draft measurables
Height	Weight	Arm length	Hand span	40-yard dash	10-yard split	20-yard split	20-yard shuttle	Three-cone drill	Vertical jump	Broad jump	Bench press
6 ft 2 in (1.88 m)	312 lb (142 kg)	33 3/8 in (0.85 m)	10 3/4 in (0.27 m)	5.08 s	1.79 s	2.96 s	4.65 s	8.21 s	27.5 in (0.70 m)	8 ft 4 in (2.54 m)	27 reps
All values from NFL Combine

=== Minnesota Vikings ===
In his rookie year for the Minnesota Vikings, Mosley accumulated 19 tackles, 3 sacks and 1 forced fumble while filling in for an injured Kevin Williams in the middle of the 2005 NFL season.

=== New York Jets ===
Mosley, along with an undisclosed draft pick, was traded to the New York Jets on August 31, 2006, for backup quarterback Brooks Bollinger.

=== Cleveland Browns ===
Mosley signed a two-year, $5 million with the Cleveland Browns on March 6, 2009. He became the first former Jets player in NFL history to later join the Browns in his career.

Mosley was placed on injured reserve on December 7, 2009, due to a broken right ankle.

=== Jacksonville Jaguars ===
Mosley was signed by the Jacksonville Jaguars on October 5, 2010. The Jaguars re-signed him on March 15, 2012.

He was released on April 1, 2013.

=== Detroit Lions ===
On April 3, 2013, Mosley signed with the Detroit Lions on a two-year contract.

The Lions sent Mosley home early before their game in London against the Atlanta Falcons after they discovered marijuana in his hotel room.

=== Miami Dolphins ===
On June 10, 2015, Mosley signed a one-year contract with the Miami Dolphins, reuniting him with former Detroit teammate, Ndamukong Suh. On December 1, 2015, he was waived/injured, but was placed on the team's injured reserve the following day after clearing waivers.

On December 18, 2015, Mosley was waived by the Dolphins.

== NFL career statistics ==
Legend
**Bold**	Career high

=== Regular season ===
Year	Team	Games		Tackles					Interceptions					Fumbles			
Year	Team	GP	GS	Cmb	Solo	Ast	Sck	TFL	Int	Yds	TD	Lng	PD	FF	FR	Yds	TD
2005	MIN	12	2	19	15	4	**3.0**	2	0	0	0	0	1	1	0	0	0
2006	NYJ	5	0	7	6	1	1.0	1	0	0	0	0	0	0	0	0	0
2007	NYJ	14	2	15	10	5	2.5	0	0	0	0	0	0	**2**	0	0	0
2008	NYJ	**16**	1	17	13	4	1.5	2	0	0	0	0	**2**	0	0	0	0
2009	CLE	12	1	18	13	5	0.0	0	0	0	0	0	0	0	0	0	0
2010	JAX	8	0	1	1	0	0.0	0	0	0	0	0	0	0	0	0	0
2011	JAX	15	3	24	14	**10**	1.0	3	0	0	0	0	0	1	0	0	0
2012	JAX	**16**	**13**	**45**	**36**	9	2.5	**4**	0	0	0	0	0	1	**3**	0	0
2013	DET	**16**	1	16	12	4	0.0	2	0	0	0	0	0	0	1	0	0
2014	DET	15	8	26	17	9	2.5	**4**	0	0	0	0	0	1	0	0	0
2015	MIA	11	0	7	4	3	0.0	1	0	0	0	0	0	0	0	0	0
		140	31	195	141	54	14.0	19	0	0	0	0	3	6	4	0	0

=== Playoffs ===
Year	Team	Games		Tackles					Interceptions					Fumbles			
Year	Team	GP	GS	Cmb	Solo	Ast	Sck	TFL	Int	Yds	TD	Lng	PD	FF	FR	Yds	TD
2006	NYJ	**1**	0	0	0	0	0.0	0	0	0	0	0	0	0	0	0	0
2014	DET	**1**	**1**	**1**	0	**1**	0.0	0	0	0	0	0	0	0	0	0	0
		2	1	1	0	1	0.0	0	0	0	0	0	0	0	0	0	0
