= Fred Smoot =

American football player (born 1979)

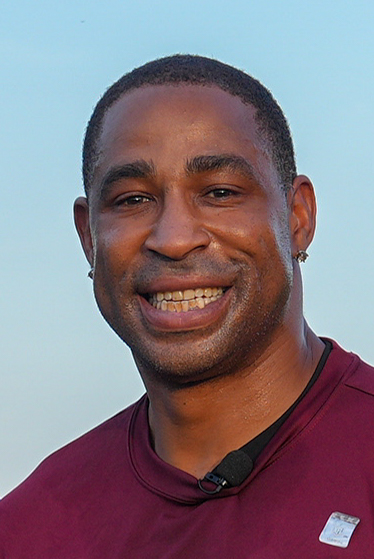
- Smoot in 2025

No. 21, 27
- Position: Cornerback

Personal information
- Born: April 17, 1979 (age 47); Jackson, Mississippi, U.S.
- Listed height: 5 ft 11 in (1.80 m)
- Listed weight: 185 lb (84 kg)

Career information
- High school: Provine (Jackson)
- College: Mississippi State (1999–2000)
- NFL draft: 2001: 2nd round, 45th overall pick

Career history
- Washington Redskins (2001–2004); Minnesota Vikings (2005–2006); Washington Redskins (2007–2009)

Awards and highlights
- PFWA All-Rookie Team (2001); Consensus All-American (2000); 2× first-team All-SEC (1999, 2000)

Career NFL statistics
- Games played: 129
- Tackles: 450
- Forced fumbles: 5
- Fumble recoveries: 3
- Pass deflections: 85
- Interceptions: 21
- Defensive touchdowns: 1
- Stats at Pro Football Reference

Fredrick Danielle Smoot (born April 17, 1979) is an American former professional football player who was a cornerback for nine seasons in the National Football League (NFL). He played college football for the Mississippi State Bulldogs and was selected by the Washington Redskins in the second round of the 2001 NFL draft. Smoot also played for the Minnesota Vikings.

== Early life ==
Smoot was born on April 17, 1979, in Jackson, Mississippi. He attended Provine High School in Jackson, and played for the Provine Rams high school football team. He was selected to play in the Mississippi-Alabama high school all-star game as a senior.

== College career ==
Smoot attended Hinds Community College from 1997 to 1998 and Mississippi State University, where he played for the Bulldogs from 1999 to 2000. He started his junior and senior years, and was a first-team All-Southeastern Conference (SEC) selection both years, and a consensus first-team All-American as a senior. He was also a finalist for the Conerly Trophy in 2000.

== Professional career ==
Pre-draft measurables
Height	Weight	Bench press
5 ft 11 3/8 in (1.81 m)	172 lb (78 kg)	1 reps
All values from NFL Combine

=== First stint with Redskins ===
Smoot was selected by the Washington Redskins as the 14th pick in the second round (45th pick overall) of the 2001 NFL draft out of Mississippi State. Many believed he was a first-round caliber player but because of questionable off-the-field problems many teams shied away from him. Afterwards, he proclaimed himself to be the steal of the draft. In Smoot's four years with the Redskins, he collected 16 interceptions, and formed an impressive duo with Champ Bailey.

=== Minnesota Vikings ===
Following a strong season as part of the impressive Redskins defense in 2004, Smoot left the club as a free agent to sign with the Minnesota Vikings. However, he was not able to duplicate his success in Minnesota.

Smoot reportedly bulked up in the 2006 offseason. His playing weight was listed at 178 lb for the 2005 season and in May 2006 the press reported he weighed about 200 lb. He faced very stiff competition for the starting spot since the Vikings drafted cornerback Cedric Griffin in the second round and cornerback Ronyell Whitaker was named All NFL Europa. In the third game of the season against Chicago, Smoot sat out the opening drive reportedly for discipline reasons. Coach Brad Childress said that was between him and Smoot. In the 11th game of the season, Smoot was benched in favor of starting Griffin instead. Childress said the switch was merited in performance and Griffin had been doing an excellent job.

==== Love Boat scandal ====
Smoot was at the center of the 2005 Minnesota Vikings boat cruise scandal involving several of his Minnesota Vikings' teammates. Some Vikings players had rented a boat on Lake Minnetonka and reportedly hired prostitutes to have a "sex party" on the boat. Smoot allegedly held a purple double-headed dildo and inserted it into the vaginas of two women who were lying on the floor in the lounge area. After one woman left, he continued to "manipulate the dildo" inside the other woman in front of the young crew. Formal charges for the Boat Scandal were filed on December 15. Smoot was also alleged to have organized the whole party, an accusation he denied.

On May 2, 2006, Smoot pleaded guilty to disorderly conduct and being a public nuisance on a watercraft in connection with the Love Boat scandal. He agreed to pay a $1,007 fine and perform 48 hours of community service. Vikings owner Zygi Wilf said, in addition to community service, he would participate in numerous service events that season. NFL spokesman Greg Aiello said fines were likely, but Smoot would not be suspended.

On September 9, 2006, the NFL imposed a fine equivalent to one game's salary against Smoot and former Vikings teammate Bryant McKinnie for their role in the Love Boat scandal, Smoot's fine was $82,352.

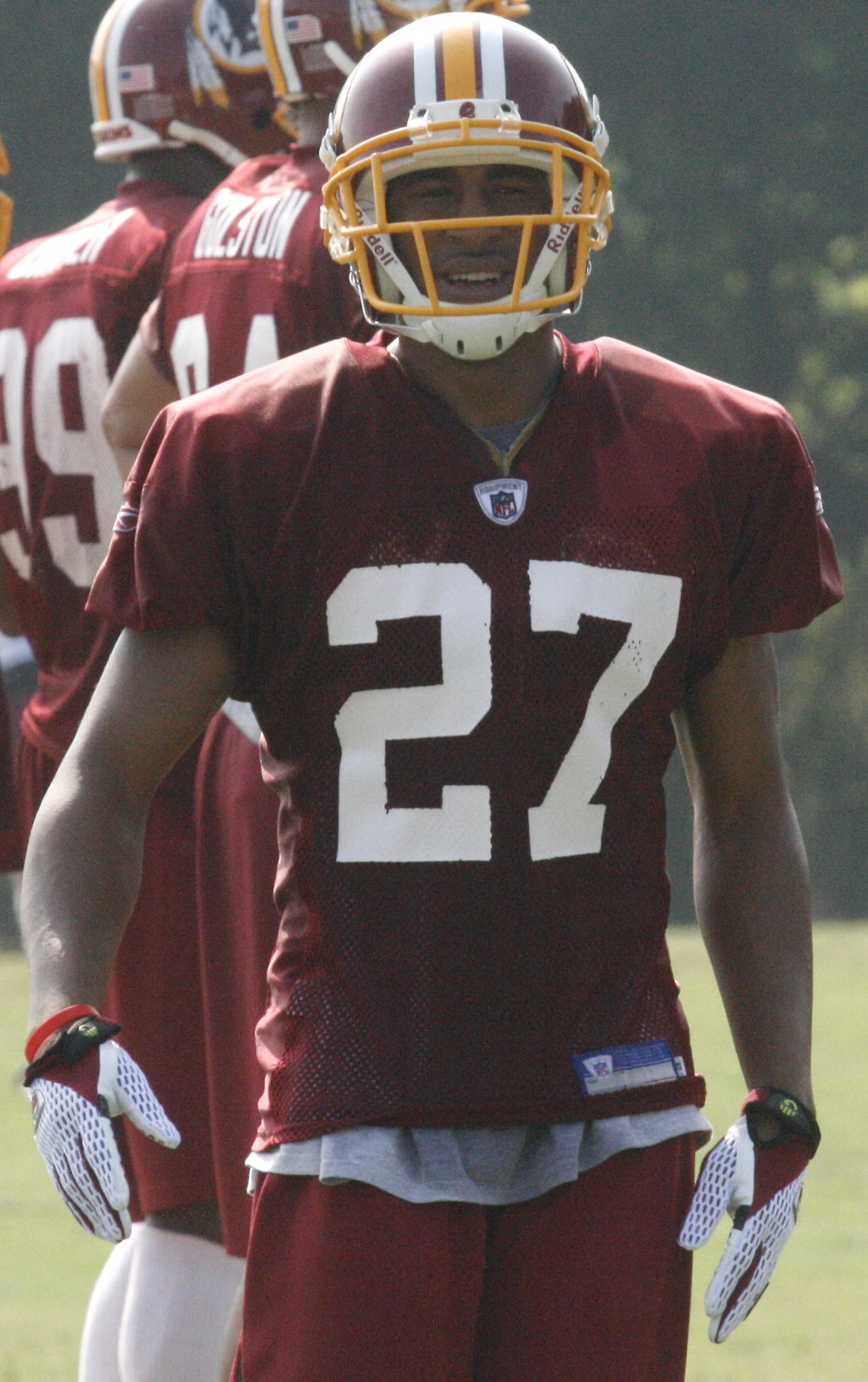
Smoot at Washington Redskins training camp in 2008.

=== Second stint with the Redskins ===
He was released on March 1, 2007, from the Vikings. On March 3, 2007, the Redskins signed Smoot to a five-year deal worth $25 million. He was released on March 4, 2010.

== NFL career statistics ==
Legend
**Bold**	Career high

=== Regular season ===
Year	Team	Games		Tackles					Interceptions					Fumbles			
Year	Team	GP	GS	Cmb	Solo	Ast	Sck	TFL	Int	Yds	TD	Lng	PD	FF	FR	Yds	TD
2001	WAS	14	13	33	30	3	0.0	0	**5**	36	0	36	12	0	**1**	0	0
2002	WAS	**16**	**16**	62	50	**12**	0.0	2	4	12	0	12	**14**	1	0	0	0
2003	WAS	15	15	58	50	8	0.0	3	4	35	0	35	9	0	0	0	0
2004	WAS	15	15	61	55	6	0.0	2	3	17	0	17	13	**2**	**1**	0	0
2005	MIN	11	8	41	37	4	0.0	0	2	0	0	0	9	0	0	0	0
2006	MIN	14	11	**63**	**59**	4	0.0	**4**	1	**47**	**1**	**47**	5	**2**	**1**	**29**	0
2007	WAS	13	11	50	44	6	0.0	0	1	**47**	0	**47**	10	0	0	0	0
2008	WAS	**16**	9	54	43	11	0.0	0	1	0	0	0	7	0	0	0	0
2009	WAS	15	6	28	22	6	0.0	0	0	0	0	0	6	0	0	0	0
		129	104	450	390	60	0.0	11	21	194	1	47	85	5	3	29	0

=== Playoffs ===
Year	Team	Games		Tackles					Interceptions					Fumbles			
Year	Team	GP	GS	Cmb	Solo	Ast	Sck	TFL	Int	Yds	TD	Lng	PD	FF	FR	Yds	TD
2007	WAS	**1**	**1**	**5**	**5**	0	0.0	0	0	0	0	0	0	0	0	0	0
		1	1	5	5	0	0.0	0	0	0	0	0	0	0	0	0	0

== Personal life ==
Smoot has advocated for the passage of the FIT Kids Act, federal legislation that would require school districts to report on students' physical activity while also distributing health and nutritional information.

Smoot is an analyst for the Washington Commanders featured weekly on "Command Center" also starting former Washington players such as Logan Paulsen, Santana Moss, London Fletcher, and Brian Mitchell. He is also well known for his success in podcasting being a recurring talent for both "Command Center Podcast," and "Get Loud! with Jenks and Smoot," both of which have been nominated for multiple People's Choice Podcast Awards including Best Sports Podcast, Best Overall Podcast (Command Center Podcast) and Best Comedy Podcast (Get Loud! with Jenks and Smoot).

Smoot signed with Barstool Sports in January 2025 to appear on their football programming for the 2025–2026 season.

=== Civil misdemeanor charge ===
On August 10, 2023, Smoot surrendered himself to the Loudoun County sheriff's department and arrested on a civil misdemeanor charge of "failure to comply with a support obligation". Smoot claimed to be initially unaware of his arrest warrants due to them being sent to an address where he no longer lived. Smoot was released by the sheriff's department the following day.
