= Travis Taylor (American football) =

American football player (born 1979)

No. 89, 18, 19, 17
- Position: Wide receiver

Personal information
- Born: March 30, 1979 (age 47); Fernandina Beach, Florida, U.S.
- Listed height: 6 ft 1 in (1.85 m)
- Listed weight: 210 lb (95 kg)

Career information
- High school: Jean Ribault (Jacksonville, Florida)
- College: Florida
- NFL draft: 2000: 1st round, 10th overall pick

Career history
- Baltimore Ravens (2000–2004); Minnesota Vikings (2005–2006); Oakland Raiders (2007); St. Louis Rams (2007); Carolina Panthers (2007); Detroit Lions (2008)

Awards and highlights
- Super Bowl champion (XXXV); Orange Bowl MVP (1999)

Career NFL statistics
- Receptions: 312
- Receiving yards: 4,017
- Receiving touchdowns: 22
- Stats at Pro Football Reference

Travis Lamont Taylor (born March 30, 1979) is an American former professional football player who was a wide receiver in the National Football League (NFL) for eight seasons during the 2000s. Taylor played college football for the University of Florida. A first-round pick in the 2000 NFL draft, he played professionally for the Baltimore Ravens, Minnesota Vikings, Oakland Raiders and St. Louis Rams of the NFL.

== Early life ==
Taylor was born in Fernandina Beach, Florida. He started his high school career at Camden County High School in Camden County, Georgia, but transferred to Jean Ribault High School in Jacksonville, Florida. As a senior at Ribault High School, Taylor was a first team Class 4A All-State selection, won All-America honors from SuperPrep, and was named to The Florida Times-Union Area Super 24 Team.

== College career ==
Taylor accepted an athletic scholarship to attend the University of Florida in Gainesville, Florida, where he played for coach Steve Spurrier's Florida Gators football team from 1997 to 1999. Taylor compiled seventy-two receptions for 1,150 yards and fifteen touchdowns in eleven career starts, and also earned Most Valuable Player honors in the 1999 Orange Bowl with seven catches for 159 yards and two touchdowns; in the 2000 Florida Citrus Bowl, he made eleven catches for 156 yards and three touchdowns. As a junior in 1999, he was selected as one of the Gators' team captains.

== Professional career ==
Pre-draft measurables
Height	Weight	Arm length	Hand span	40-yard dash	Vertical jump
6 ft 0 7/8 in (1.85 m)	199 lb (90 kg)	31 1/2 in (0.80 m)	9 1/4 in (0.23 m)	4.43 s	37.0 in (0.94 m)
All values from NFL Combine

=== Baltimore Ravens ===
The Baltimore Ravens selected Taylor in the first round (tenth pick overall) in the 2000 NFL draft; he was the third receiver taken in the 2000 draft. The Ravens had high hopes of him making an immediate impact. However, Taylor would only make twenty-eight catches for 278 yards in nine games as a rookie in 2000. That season, Taylor showed early promise for himself and for his team by scoring two touchdowns in the second game of the season, a shootout victory over the Jacksonville Jaguars—a team the Ravens had never beaten. In 2000, the Ravens would go on to win Super Bowl XXXV. Taylor's best season with Baltimore came in 2002, when he compiled sixty-one catches for 869 yards and six touchdowns. Baltimore released Taylor after a lackluster 2004 season.

=== Minnesota Vikings ===
Taylor was then picked up by the Minnesota Vikings, where he played the 2005 and 2006 seasons and led the team in receiving both years. In 32 games (29 starts) with the team, Taylor caught 107 passes for 1,255 yards and seven touchdowns. He became a free agent in the 2007 offseason.

=== Oakland Raiders ===
On May 22, 2007, Taylor was signed by the Oakland Raiders. He was inactive for the team's season opener, then played in the team's Week 2 contest but recorded no statistics. He was released on September 22.

=== St. Louis Rams ===
Taylor worked out for the New Orleans Saints on October 11, 2007, but was not signed. He was signed by the St. Louis Rams a week later. He appeared in one game for the team, catching one pass for four yards and recording a solo tackle on special teams. The Rams released him in November.

=== Carolina Panthers ===
On December 26, 2007, the Carolina Panthers signed Taylor to a two-year contract. He was inactive for the team's regular season finale. He was released from the team on August 30, 2008.

=== Detroit Lions ===
Taylor was signed by the Detroit Lions on December 16, 2008, after wide receiver Shaun McDonald was placed on injured reserve. He was released on May 4, 2009.

During his eight-season NFL career, Taylor played in 101 regular season games, and started ninety of them. He had 312 career receptions for 4,017 yards and twenty-two touchdowns; he also had thirty-two carries for 232 rushing yards.

== NFL statistics ==
=== Regular season ===
Year	Team	GP	Receiving						Rushing					
Year	Team	GP	Rec	Yds	Avg	Lng	TD	FD	Att	Yds	Avg	Lng	TD	FD
2000	BAL	9	28	276	9.9	40	3	17	2	11	5.5	12	0	1
2001	BAL	16	42	560	13.3	63	3	27	5	46	9.2	16	0	3
2002	BAL	16	61	869	14.2	64	6	40	11	105	9.5	39	0	4
2003	BAL	16	39	632	16.2	73	3	23	11	62	5.6	16	0	2
2004	BAL	11	34	421	12.4	47	0	21	—	—	—	—	—	—
2005	MIN	16	50	604	12.1	31	4	34	2	3	1.5	5	0	0
2006	MIN	16	57	651	11.4	36	3	29	1	5	5.0	5	0	0
2007	STL	1	1	4	4.0	4	0	0	—	—	—	—	—	—
Career		101	312	4,017	12.9	73	22	191	32	232	7.3	39	0	10

=== Postseason ===
Year	Team	GP	Receiving						Rushing					
Year	Team	GP	Rec	Yds	Avg	Lng	TD	FD	Att	Yds	Avg	Lng	TD	FD
2001	BAL	2	6	76	12.7	45	1	3	1	15	15.0	15	0	1
2003	BAL	1	7	82	11.7	30	0	5	—	—	—	—	—	—
Career		3	13	158	12.2	45	1	8	1	15	15.5	15	0	1

== See also ==
- Florida Gators football, 1990–99
- List of Baltimore Ravens first-round draft picks
- List of Detroit Lions players
- List of Florida Gators in the NFL draft
