= Ciatrick Fason =

American gridiron football player (born 1982)

No. 35
- Position: Running back

Personal information
- Born: October 29, 1982 (age 44); Atlanta, Georgia, U.S.
- Listed height: 6 ft 0 in (1.83 m)
- Listed weight: 207 lb (94 kg)

Career information
- High school: Duncan U. Fletcher (Neptune Beach, Florida)
- College: Florida
- NFL draft: 2005: 4th round, 112th overall pick

Career history
- Minnesota Vikings (2005–2006); Jacksonville Jaguars (2008)*; Edmonton Eskimos (2009)*
- * Offseason or practice squad member only

Awards and highlights
- First-team All-SEC (2004)

Career NFL statistics
- Rushing attempts: 50
- Rushing yards: 161
- Rushing touchdowns: 5
- Receptions: 3
- Receiving yards: 19
- Receiving touchdowns: 0
- Stats at Pro Football Reference

Ciatrick Antione Fason (born October 29, 1982) is an American former professional football player who was a running back for two seasons with the Minnesota Vikings of the National Football League (NFL) during the early 2000s. Fason played college football for the Florida Gators.

== Early life ==
Fason was born in Atlanta, Georgia. He attended Duncan U. Fletcher High School in Neptune Beach, Florida, and he was a star running back and four-time most valuable player for the Fletcher Senators high school football team. He rushed for over 7,400 career yards—twice for over 2,000 yards in a season—and finished his high school career as Florida's fifth all-time leading rusher and tops in Northeast Florida history. Parade magazine and PrepStar recognized Fason as a high school All-American in 2001. Rated as a five-star recruit by Rivals.com, Fason was listed as the top running back prospect in the nation in 2002.

== College career ==
Fason received an athletic scholarship to attend the University of Florida in Gainesville, Florida, where he played for coach Ron Zook's Florida Gators football team from 2002 to 2004. As a sophomore in 2003, he had a 75-yard touchdown run against the Arkansas Razorbacks and rushed for 190 yards against the South Carolina Gamecocks. During his junior season in 2004, Fason was named a team captain, and rushed for 1,267 yards on 222 carries and caught thirty-five passes for 266 yards—a total of 1,533 offensive yards (fourth best in Gators history). After the season, he was recognized as an Associated Press first-team All-Southeastern Conference (SEC) selection and a CNN-Sports Illustrated honorable mention All-American, and was the recipient of the Gators' most valuable player award and their Fergie Ferguson Award—recognizing the team member who "displayed outstanding leadership, character and courage." After his junior year, he decided to forgo his final season of NCAA eligibility and declared for the NFL draft.

== Professional career ==
=== Minnesota Vikings ===
The Minnesota Vikings selected Fason in the fourth round (112th pick overall) of the 2005 NFL draft. He played for the Vikings for two seasons in 2005 and 2006. During his two years with the Vikings, he appeared in eighteen regular season games, rushing for 161 yards and five touchdowns on fifty carries. On August 31, 2007, the Vikings released him.

=== Jacksonville Jaguars ===
In 2008, Fason worked out for his hometown Jacksonville Jaguars. He wrote a letter to Jaguars GM James Harris asking if he could at least try out. Fason stated in a press conference, "No matter what I did in my NFL career, I just wanted to wear a Jaguars' uniform, even if it was just for a tryout." On August 25, 2008, Fason was signed by the Jaguars; on August 30, he was released.

=== Edmonton Eskimos ===
Fason was signed by the Edmonton Eskimos on April 24, 2009. He was released on June 25, 2009, re-signed on July 5, and released again on August 25.

== See also ==
- List of Florida Gators in the NFL draft
- List of Minnesota Vikings players
