= Mike Tice =

American football player and coach (born 1959)

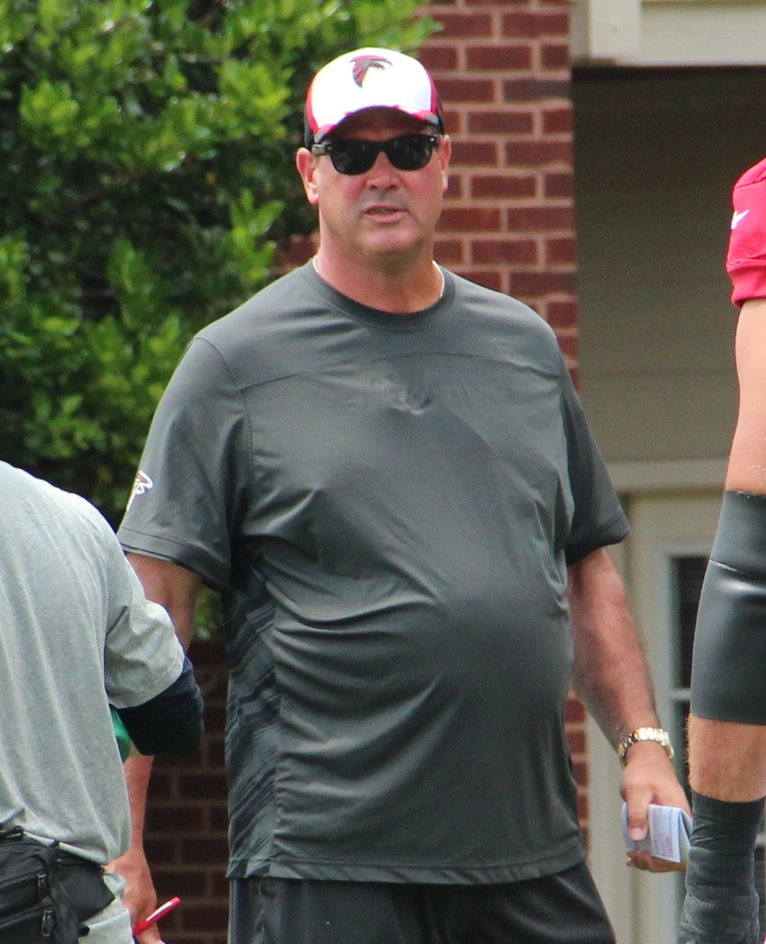
- Tice in 2014

No. 86, 87, 83
- Position: Tight end

Personal information
- Born: February 2, 1959 (age 67); Central Islip, New York, U.S.
- Listed height: 6 ft 7 in (2.01 m)
- Listed weight: 250 lb (113 kg)

Career information
- High school: Central Islip
- College: Maryland (1977–1980)
- NFL draft: 1981: undrafted

Career history

Playing
- Seattle Seahawks (1981–1988); Washington Redskins (1989); Seattle Seahawks (1990–1991); Minnesota Vikings (1992–1993, 1995)

Coaching
- Minnesota Vikings (1996) Tight ends coach; Minnesota Vikings (1997–2001) Offensive line coach; Minnesota Vikings (2001) Interim head coach; Minnesota Vikings (2002–2005) Head coach; Jacksonville Jaguars (2006) Assistant head coach & Offense; Jacksonville Jaguars (2007–2009) Assistant head coach & Tight ends coach; Chicago Bears (2010–2011) Offensive line coach; Chicago Bears (2012) Offensive coordinator; Atlanta Falcons (2014) Offensive line coach; Oakland Raiders (2015–2017) Offensive line coach

Career NFL statistics
- Receptions: 107
- Receiving yards: 894
- Touchdowns: 11
- Stats at Pro Football Reference

Head coaching record
- Regular season: 32–33 (.492)
- Postseason: 1–1 (.500)
- Career: 33–34 (.493)
- Coaching profile at Pro Football Reference

Michael Peter Tice (born February 2, 1959) is an American former professional football player and coach in the National Football League (NFL). He played in the NFL as a tight end. Tice played college football for the Maryland Terrapins and played 11 seasons in the NFL before spending 22 seasons as a coach, including four seasons as the Minnesota Vikings head coach.

== Playing career ==
Tice attended the University of Maryland, College Park, where he played quarterback for the Terrapins. He played tight end in the National Football League (NFL) from 1981 to 1995 with the Seattle Seahawks, Washington Redskins and Minnesota Vikings.

Tice was inducted into the Suffolk Sports Hall of Fame on Long Island in the Coaches and Football Categories with the Class of 2013.

== Coaching career ==
=== Minnesota Vikings ===
Immediately after his retirement from playing, Tice joined the Vikings' coaching staff, serving first as tight ends coach (1996) and offensive line coach (1997–2001). Tice took over head coaching duties on an interim basis for the final game of the 2001 season, replacing Dennis Green. On January 10, 2002, Tice was named the 6th head coach in franchise history, Bud Grant having been both 2nd and 4th. He was the first former Viking player to assume the role.

In 2002, the Vikings led the NFL in rushing for the first time in team history, and in 2003, they led the league in total offense for the first time. A season later, the Vikings broke team records with 6,339 total yards and 4,754 passing yards and scored 50 touchdowns.

In March 2005, the NFL began to investigate Tice for organizing and profiting from a Super Bowl ticket scalping operation within the Vikings organization. He later admitted that these charges were true and the NFL fined him $100,000 on June 30, 2005. At the time, it was the largest fine ever handed down to a head coach in NFL history, and is still the largest for a head coach who does not also have the title or powers of general manager.

Tice was also the head coach during the Minnesota Vikings boat party scandal which occurred in October 2005. Some commentators believe that this incident led to his demise in Minnesota.

Tice's contract with the Minnesota Vikings was allowed to expire after the last game of the 2005 season on January 1, 2006. The Vikings had just defeated the Chicago Bears, but a loss to the Baltimore Ravens eliminated the Vikings from playoff contention and effectively sealed Tice's fate. During his tenure of more than four years as the Vikings head coach, he had a regular season record of 32–33–0, while going 1–1 in the playoffs. Also during his tenure, the Vikings recorded an NFL record for the most consecutive games with over 300 yards of offense with 36.

=== Jacksonville Jaguars ===
Tice was hired as assistant head coach/offense of Jacksonville by Jack Del Rio, another former Viking.

=== Chicago Bears ===
On January 15, 2010, Tice was hired as offensive line coach for the Chicago Bears. On October 3, 2010, his offensive line allowed 9 sacks in one half to the New York Giants. On September 17, 2010, against the Cowboys, his line only gave up one sack and held DeMarcus Ware, one of the leading sackers since he came into the NFL, sackless. Despite this, the Bears allowed 105 sacks in his two years as offensive line coach.

On January 6, 2012, the Bears promoted Tice to offensive coordinator, filling the void left by the resignation of Mike Martz.

On January 16, 2013, the Bears hired Marc Trestman to be the Bears new head coach after Lovie Smith was fired. It was also announced that the Bears had hired Aaron Kromer to replace Tice as offensive coordinator and offensive line coach. Tice was dismissed by the Bears on January 17, 2013.

=== Atlanta Falcons ===
Tice was hired to be the Atlanta Falcons offensive line coach in January 2014.

=== Oakland Raiders ===
Tice was hired to be the Oakland Raiders offensive line coach in January 2015. On February 6, 2018, Tice announced that he was retiring from coaching. He said that he was ready to move on from the coaching ranks because "players today don't want to be coached."

== Head coaching record ==
Team	Year	Regular season					Postseason			
Team	Year	Won	Lost	Ties	Win %	Finish	Won	Lost	Win %	Result
MIN	2001	0	1	0	.000	4th in NFC Central	–	–	–	–
MIN	2002	6	10	0	.375	2nd in NFC North	–	–	–	–
MIN	2003	9	7	0	.563	2nd in NFC North	–	–	–	–
MIN	2004	8	8	0	.500	2nd in NFC North	1	1	.500	Lost to Philadelphia Eagles in NFC Divisional Game
MIN	2005	9	7	0	.563	2nd in NFC North	–	–	–	–
MIN Total		32	33	0	.492		1	1	.500	
Total		32	33	0	.492		1	1	.500	

== Personal life ==
Mike Tice is the older brother of John Tice, also a former tight end at the University of Maryland, who played ten seasons in the NFL with the New Orleans Saints. John was an assistant coach for the Vikings in Mike's tenure. His son, Nate, was a quarterback for the Wisconsin Badgers and became an NFL writer and podcaster after working in the back office for NFL teams. During Mike's time with Seattle, his teammates referred to his eating style as "Mike Tice's Lunchout" in a humorous parody of the then popular video game, Mike Tyson's Punch-Out!! Tice currently lives in the Las Vegas area with his wife, Diane.
