= Brian Williams (cornerback) =

American football player (born 1979)

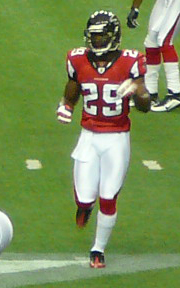
- Williams with the Atlanta Falcons in 2009

No. 29, 43
- Position: Cornerback

Personal information
- Born: July 2, 1979 (age 47); High Point, North Carolina, U.S.
- Listed height: 5 ft 11 in (1.80 m)
- Listed weight: 202 lb (92 kg)

Career information
- High school: Southwest Guilford (NC)
- College: NC State
- NFL draft: 2002: 4th round, 105th overall pick

Career history
- Minnesota Vikings (2002–2005); Jacksonville Jaguars (2006–2008); Atlanta Falcons (2009–2010); New York Giants (2011)

Career NFL statistics
- Total tackles: 508
- Sacks: 5
- Forced fumbles: 9
- Fumble recoveries: 3
- Interceptions: 19
- Defensive touchdowns: 1
- Stats at Pro Football Reference

Brian Williams (born July 2, 1979) is an American former professional football player who was a cornerback in the National Football League (NFL). He was selected by the Minnesota Vikings in the fourth round of the 2002 NFL draft. He played college football for the North Carolina State Wolfpack.

He also played for the Jacksonville Jaguars, Atlanta Falcons, and New York Giants.

== College career ==
Williams attended North Carolina State University and was a student and a letterman in football. In football, he was a three-year starter for as a cornerback and finished his collegiate career with 262 tackles (nine for loss), 5 interceptions, 20 passes defensed, 1 sack, 2 fumble recoveries, 1 forced fumble, and 5 blocked kicks.

== Professional career ==
=== Minnesota Vikings ===
Williams was selected in the fourth round of the 2002 NFL draft by the Minnesota Vikings.

=== Jacksonville Jaguars ===
On March 11, 2006, he was signed by the Jacksonville Jaguars as an unrestricted free agent.

The Jaguars released Williams on September 5, 2009.

=== Atlanta Falcons ===
Williams signed with the Atlanta Falcons on September 6, 2009. On October 18, in a Sunday night game against the Chicago Bears, Williams tore his ACL defending a pass. Williams was out for the remainder of the 2009 season. After the 2009 season, Williams became an unrestricted free agent. The Falcons re-signed him on March 4, 2010, to a one-year contract.

=== New York Giants ===
On August 24, 2011, Williams signed with the New York Giants, but he was released on October 5, 2011.

== NFL career statistics ==
Legend
	Led the league
**Bold**	Career high

=== Regular season ===
Year	Team	Games		Tackles					Interceptions					Fumbles			
Year	Team	GP	GS	Cmb	Solo	Ast	Sck	TFL	Int	Yds	TD	Lng	PD	FF	FR	Yds	TD
2002	MIN	**16**	7	43	35	8	0.0	1	1	2	0	2	6	1	**1**	0	0
2003	MIN	**16**	**16**	79	63	**16**	**3.0**	4	**5**	**205**	**1**	**77**	**16**	**2**	0	0	0
2004	MIN	**16**	**16**	76	63	13	0.0	**5**	2	14	0	14	11	**2**	0	0	0
2005	MIN	14	9	48	36	12	1.0	1	4	59	0	31	9	**2**	0	0	0
2006	JAX	15	15	56	48	8	0.0	0	1	4	0	4	10	1	0	0	0
2007	JAX	14	14	68	55	13	0.0	4	3	10	0	6	9	1	0	0	0
2008	JAX	**16**	**16**	**83**	**75**	8	0.0	**5**	2	31	0	27	10	0	0	0	0
2009	ATL	5	5	18	15	3	0.0	0	1	-2	0	-2	3	0	**1**	**53**	0
2010	ATL	**16**	1	36	25	11	1.0	3	0	0	0	0	1	0	**1**	12	0
2011	NYG	4	0	1	1	0	0.0	0	0	0	0	0	0	0	0	0	0
		132	99	508	416	92	5.0	23	19	323	1	77	75	9	3	65	0

=== Playoffs ===
Year	Team	Games		Tackles					Interceptions					Fumbles			
Year	Team	GP	GS	Cmb	Solo	Ast	Sck	TFL	Int	Yds	TD	Lng	PD	FF	FR	Yds	TD
2004	MIN	**2**	**2**	**16**	**12**	**4**	0.0	**1**	**1**	0	0	0	**4**	0	0	0	0
2007	JAX	**2**	**2**	9	5	**4**	0.0	**1**	0	0	0	0	0	0	0	0	0
		4	4	25	17	8	0.0	2	1	0	0	0	4	0	0	0	0
