= Adimchinobe Echemandu =

Nigerian gridiron football player (born 1981)

No. 23, 39, 20, 38, 33
- Position: Running back

Personal information
- Born: November 21, 1981 (age 44); Lagos, Nigeria
- Listed height: 5 ft 10 in (1.78 m)
- Listed weight: 225 lb (102 kg)

Career information
- High school: Hawthorne (Hawthorne, California, U.S.)
- College: California
- NFL draft: 2004: 7th round, 208th overall pick

Career history
- Cleveland Browns (2004); Minnesota Vikings (2005); Oakland Raiders (2006−2007); Houston Texans (2007); Oakland Raiders (2008)*
- * Offseason or practice squad member only

Awards and highlights
- First-team All-Pac-10 (2003)

Career NFL statistics
- Rushing attempts: 28
- Rushing yards: 110
- Receptions: 5
- Receiving yards: 36
- Stats at Pro Football Reference

Adimchinobe Echemandu (born November 21, 1981) is a Nigerian-American former professional football running back who played in the National Football League (NFL). He was selected by the Cleveland Browns in the seventh round of the 2004 NFL draft. He played college football at California.

== Early life ==
He played football at Hawthorne High School in Hawthorne, California. He ran for 608 yards and 6 touchdowns as a junior, and in track, he had a best of 21.35 in the 200 meters, 10.40 in the 100 meters, and 47.55 in the 400. As a senior, he ran for 1,525 yards on 165 carries sporting a 9.2 average and 27 touchdowns. He also returned two kickoffs for touchdowns, and was named his conference's back of the year in 1998. As a defensive player, he had 42 tackles and an interception as a senior. He was also a member of the Super Prep All-Far West team as the No. 60 overall prospect and the Prep Star All-America team as the No. 10 running back prospect in the West.

== College career ==
A member of an Ibo family from Nigeria, he played for a time under the simplified name Joe Echema until deciding to revert to his Ibo name. Echemandu returned to the gridiron with a flourish in 2003 after spending the previous two years on the sidelines partially due to a knee injury. He saw his banner final campaign end on a sour note after it was discovered that he fractured his fibula late in the year. A two-sport star, he also excelled in track for the Golden Bears. He was a versatile athlete who was recruited as a tailback, but moved to wide receiver midway through his freshman season when injuries depleted their unit, then shifted back to tailback the following year. He sat out the 2002 season to recover from a torn anterior cruciate ligament in his right knee, and finished his career with 306 carries for 1,434 yards and 16 touchdowns. As well as 33 receptions for 264 yards and a pair of scores, 22 kickoff returns for 5,016 yards and two punt returns for 5 yards while starting 19 of 33 games.

== Professional career ==
=== Cleveland Browns ===
He was selected with the 208th overall pick by the Cleveland Browns in the seventh round of the 2004 NFL draft. In his time spent with the Browns, he carried the ball just 8 times for 25 yards, and caught the ball 3 times for 25 yards.

=== Minnesota Vikings ===
On September 2, 2005, he was signed by the Minnesota Vikings and spent time on the practice squad for most of the season.

=== Oakland Raiders (first stint) ===
On September 5, 2006, he was signed to the practice squad of the Oakland Raiders. The best action he had was only in preseason of the 2007 season.

=== Houston Texans ===
On October 10, 2007, he was signed to the Houston Texans' practice squad after being released by the Raiders. In an October 28 game against the San Diego Chargers, he rushed for 62 yards on 10 carries and caught two passes for 11 yards. He finished his 2007 season with 20 attempts for 85 yards, 2 receptions for 11 yards and 1 fumble. He only fumbled 2 times in his career.

Echemandu was released by the Texans on December 26, 2007.

=== Oakland Raiders (second stint) ===
In 2008, he signed with the Raiders again, only to be released on August 30.

== Personal life and later life ==
Echemandu received his master's degree in education in May, 2017 at the University of California, Berkeley. He is the son of Charity and Joe Echema Sr., as well as the cousin of former California and former Oakland Raiders cornerback Nnamdi Asomugha.

Following football, he reverted to the name Joe Echema and became a firefighter with the Redwood City, California fire department in 2012. In 2020, he sued the city for racial discrimination, alleging racial harassment and inappropriate comments and jokes for being an African immigrant, and stated he slept in his car rather than at the firehouse at times due to colleagues' remarks.
