= List of Minnesota Vikings starting quarterbacks =

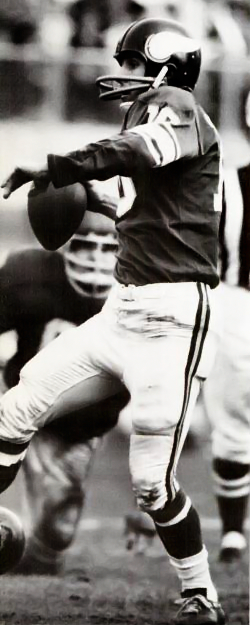
Fran Tarkenton has the most starts in franchise history.

The Minnesota Vikings are a professional American football team based in Minneapolis. They are members of the North Division of the National Football Conference (NFC) in the National Football League (NFL). A franchise was granted to Minneapolis businessmen Bill Boyer, H. P. Skoglund and Max Winter in 1959 as a member of the American Football League (AFL). The ownership forfeited their AFL membership in January 1960 and received the National Football League's 14th franchise on January 28, 1960, that started play in 1961.

According to Pro‑Football‑Reference, the Minnesota Vikings have fielded multiple starting quarterbacks each season since entering the NFL in 1961, with Fran Tarkenton, Tommy Kramer, Daunte Culpepper, Kirk Cousins and others among their most frequent starters. Pro‑Football‑Reference’s official team history database tracks all starting lineups for the franchise.^{[a]} The Vikings' past starting quarterbacks include Pro Football Hall of Fame inductees Fran Tarkenton, Brett Favre and Warren Moon. The team's first starting quarterback was George Shaw; he was replaced by Tarkenton in the franchise's first game, and the future Hall of Famer retained the starting role for most of the remainder of the season. Sam Darnold was Minnesota's most recent starting quarterback, from 2024, until being signed by the Seattle Seahawks in 2025.

== History ==
The Vikings' starting quarterback for the first game of their inaugural season against the Chicago Bears was George Shaw. However, he was replaced by Fran Tarkenton early on, who passed for four touchdowns in the game and rushed for one more. Tarkenton went on to start in 10 of the Vikings' 14 regular season matches that year. He played for the Vikings until 1967, when he was traded to the New York Giants, and Joe Kapp took his place as the Vikings' starting quarterback . Kapp led the Vikings to their first playoff appearance in 1968, but he was traded to the Boston Patriots in 1970 and Gary Cuozzo stepped up to replace him. Cuozzo remained in the position for two seasons, moving to the St. Louis Cardinals in 1972.

Tarkenton returned for another seven-year spell as the Vikings' starting quarterback in 1972, continuing until his retirement in 1978, at which point Tommy Kramer was promoted from the second string in his second season with the franchise. Kramer was injured for most of the 1983 season, so Steve Dils served as the starting quarterback for most of the season, before Kramer reclaimed the position in 1984. For the 1987 season, Kramer shared quarterback duties with Wade Wilson, before Wilson took over on a permanent basis from 1988. Wilson was replaced by the emerging Rich Gannon in 1990, but Gannon was released after the 1992 season and veteran Jim McMahon took over for the 1993 season until the arrival of Warren Moon in 1994.

Moon retained the starting quarterback spot for two seasons, but suffered a broken collarbone halfway through his third season with the Vikings and was replaced by Brad Johnson for the remainder of the season. The Vikings had three starting quarterbacks in the following three seasons – Johnson (1997), Randall Cunningham (1998) and Jeff George (1999) – before Daunte Culpepper began a six-year spell in his second year in the NFL in 2000. He suffered a serious knee injury during the 2005 season, and Johnson took over in the position again, having re-signed the previous summer after seven years away from the franchise. Culpepper then joined the Miami Dolphins in 2006, giving Johnson another full year as starting quarterback, only to be replaced by sophomore Tarvaris Jackson in 2007. The 2008 season commenced with Jackson starting at quarterback, but he was replaced after two games by Gus Frerotte, who was returning to the Vikings from the St. Louis Rams after having been traded to the Miami Dolphins in 2005. Jackson regained the job for the final three games and led the Vikings to their first divisional title since 2000, and their first NFC North title.

In 2009, the Vikings recruited veteran quarterback Brett Favre out of retirement to be their new starting quarterback. In Week 13 of the 2010 season, Favre suffered a chest injury that ended his NFL-record streak of consecutive starts at 297 (321 including postseason games), and Tarvaris Jackson reclaimed the starting spot for Week 14. However, Jackson was injured himself in Week 15, giving rookie Joe Webb a chance to stake a claim for the position. He was unable to hold onto the position as Donovan McNabb was signed as a free agent to replace Favre, who retired at the end of the 2010 season. After going 1–5 through the first six games of 2011, though, McNabb was replaced by first-round draft pick Christian Ponder, who retained the starting position for the remainder of the season and for the whole of 2012. However, he was plagued by indifferent form and the Vikings signed Matt Cassel – recently released by the Kansas City Chiefs. When Ponder suffered an injury early in the 2013 season, Cassel was given his first start for the Vikings in week 4 in the NFL International Series game against the Pittsburgh Steelers at Wembley Stadium, London. He started the following game, but was replaced in week 7 by Josh Freeman, recently signed after his release by the Tampa Bay Buccaneers. However, he was injured during the game and did not make another start for the Vikings, allowing Ponder to reclaim the starting role. Cassel then returned as the starter in week 14, and retained the role for the rest of the season and into 2014. After three games, he was placed on injured reserve and first-round draft pick Teddy Bridgewater took over for the week 4 game against the Atlanta Falcons. Bridgewater himself was injured late in the game, allowing Ponder the chance to come back in for the following week, but the rookie soon returned and has held the starting berth until suffering a knee injury in practice during the 2016 preseason.

Shaun Hill started the season opener and Sam Bradford took over in week 2. In 2017, Bradford played only two games due to injuries he sustained in Weeks 2 and 5. Case Keenum started in his place, leading the Vikings to a 13 win season, as well as the Minneapolis Miracle and subsequent NFC Championship Game. Keenum would sign with the Denver Broncos that offseason.

Ahead of the 2018 season, the Vikings signed free agent quarterback Kirk Cousins from the Washington Redskins on a three-year, fully guaranteed $84 million contract. He started 31 consecutive regular season games to start his Vikings career before sitting out the final game of 2019 with the team's playoff berth already secured; Sean Mannion started in his place.

After Cousins left to join the Atlanta Falcons before the 2024 season, the Vikings signed Sam Darnold to a one-year, $10 million contract. The Vikings would finish 14–3, yet go into the playoffs as a wildcard.

Eight Vikings quarterbacks have made at least one start in their rookie season: Tarkenton in 1961, Vander Kelen in 1963, Kramer in 1977, Jackson in 2006, Webb in 2010, Ponder in 2011, Bridgewater in 2014, and Jaren Hall in 2023.

== Starting quarterbacks by season ==
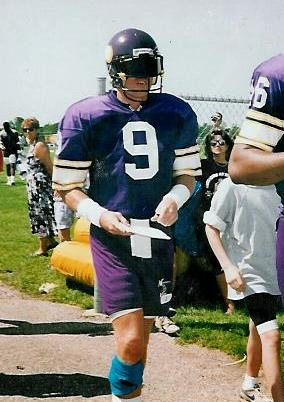
Jim McMahon was the Vikings' starting quarterback for the 1993 season.

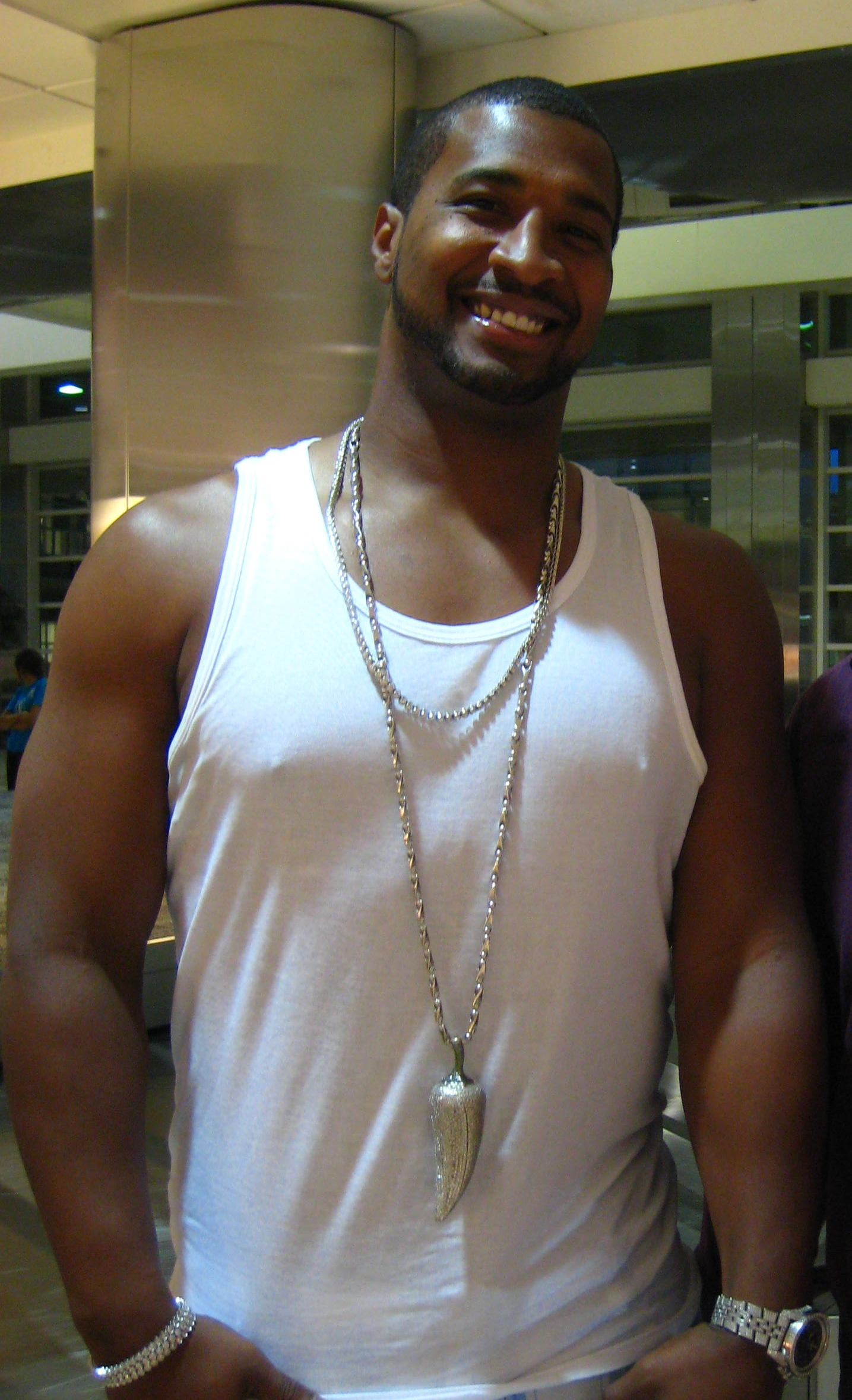
Daunte Culpepper was the Vikings' starting quarterback for six seasons from 2000 to 2005.

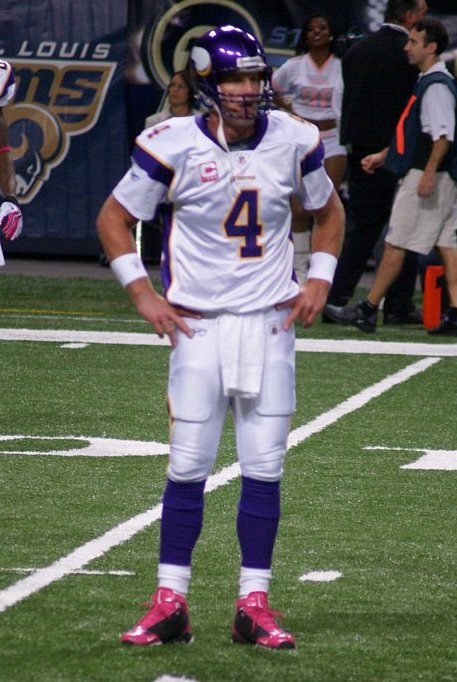
Brett Favre took over as the Vikings' starting quarterback in 2009.

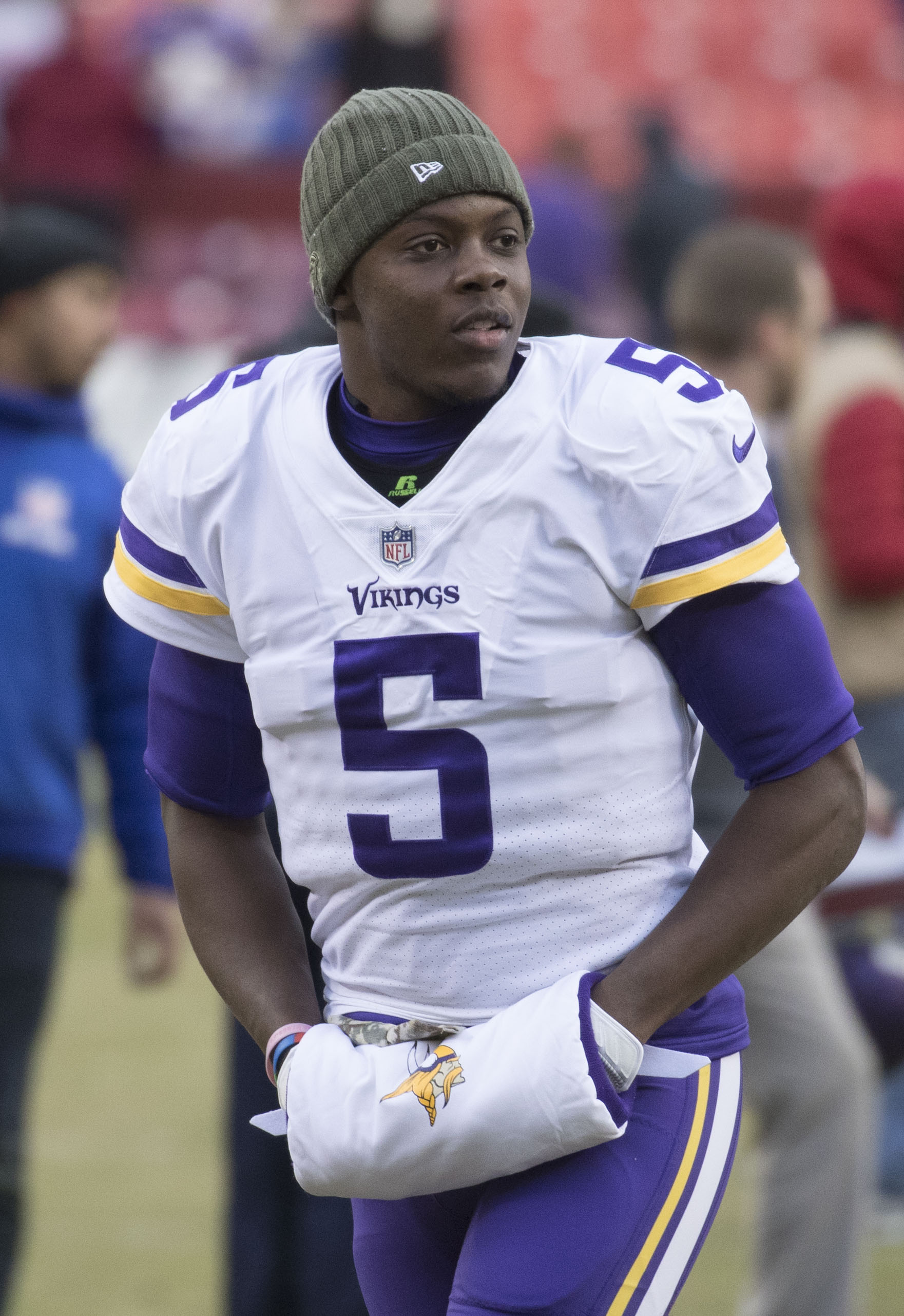
Teddy Bridgewater was the Vikings' starting quarterback from Week 4 of the 2014 season until the end of the 2015 season. He tore his ACL on August 30, 2016, and was declared out for the rest of the 2016 season.

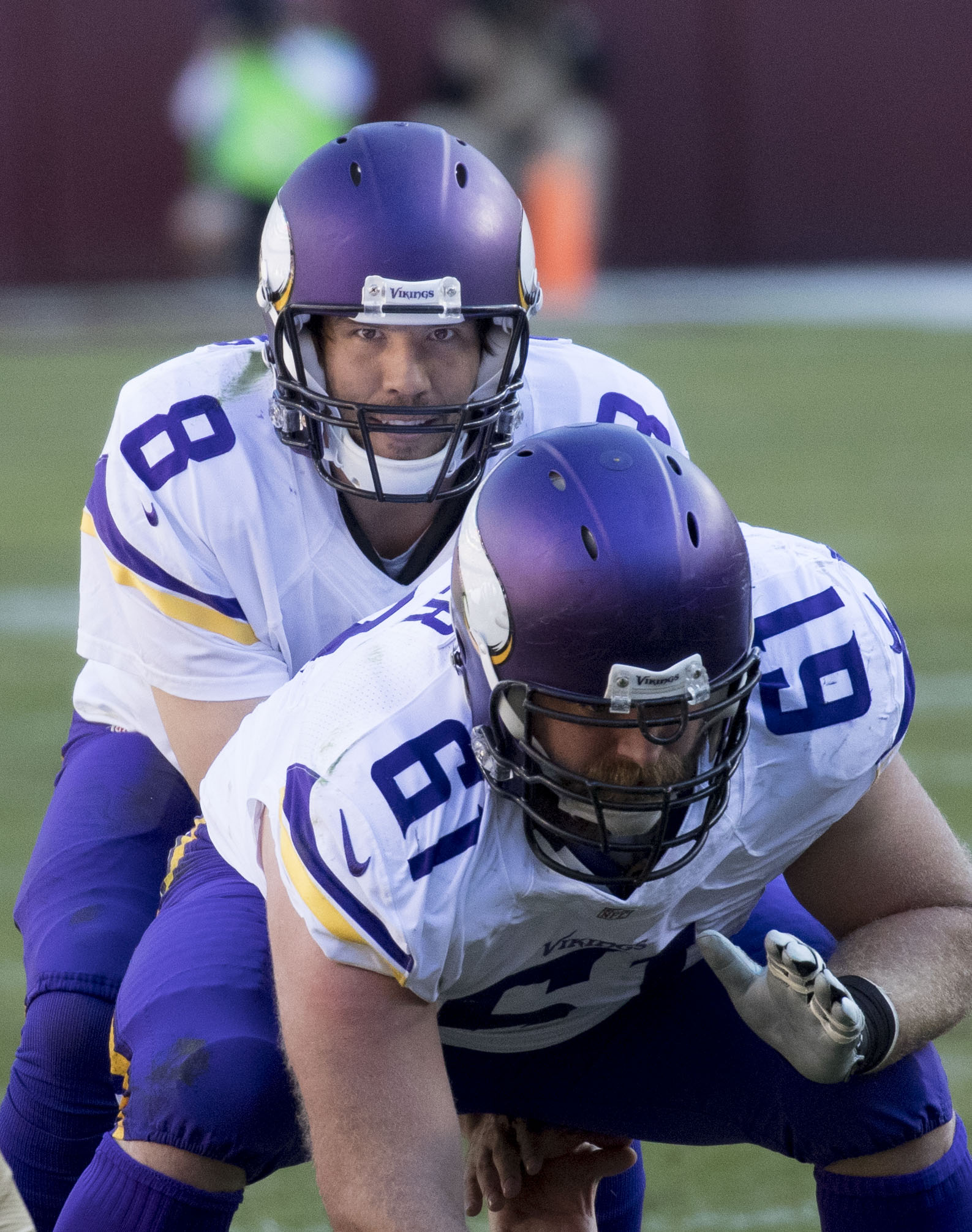
Sam Bradford was the Vikings' starting quarterback during the 2016 season until Week 2 of the 2017 season.

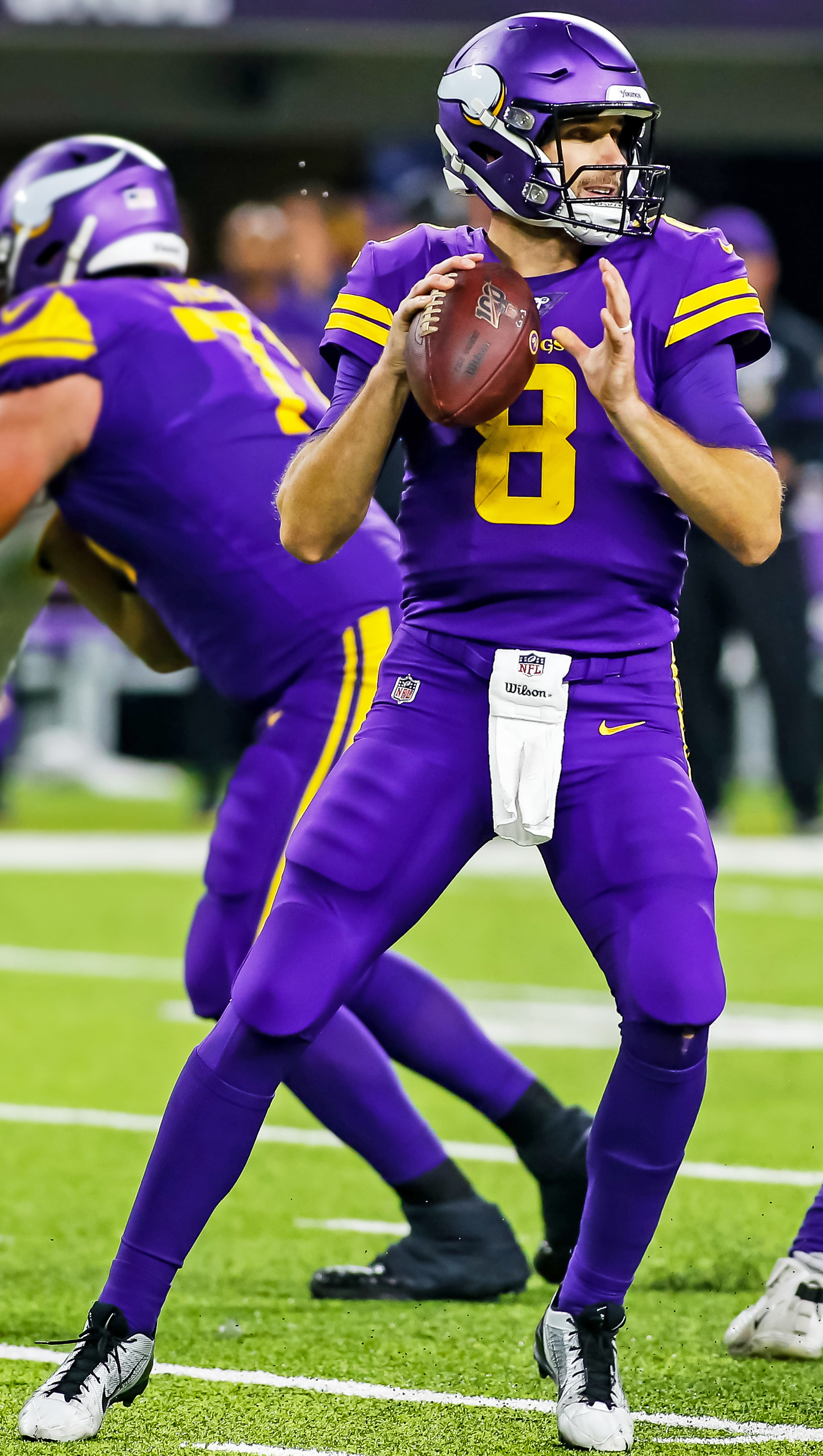
Kirk Cousins was the Minnesota Vikings' starting quarterback from 2018 to 2024.

Year	Column links to corresponding team season
(#)	Number of games started in the regular season or post-season win–loss record
†	Inducted to the Pro Football Hall of Fame

=== Regular season ===
Season	Quarterback(s)	Ref(s).
1961	Fran Tarkenton^{†} (10) / George Shaw (4)	
1962	Fran Tarkenton^{†} (14)	
1963	Fran Tarkenton^{†} (13) / Ron Vander Kelen (1)	
1964	Fran Tarkenton^{†} (14)	
1965	Fran Tarkenton^{†} (14)	
1966	Fran Tarkenton^{†} (12) / Bob Berry (1) / Ron Vander Kelen (1)	
1967	Joe Kapp (11) / Ron Vander Kelen (3)	
1968	Joe Kapp (14)	
1969	Joe Kapp (13) / Gary Cuozzo (1)	
1970	Gary Cuozzo (12) / Bob Lee (2)	
1971	Gary Cuozzo (8) / Bob Lee (4) / Norm Snead (2)	
1972	Fran Tarkenton^{†} (14)	
1973	Fran Tarkenton^{†} (14)	
1974	Fran Tarkenton^{†} (13) / Bob Berry (1)	
1975	Fran Tarkenton^{†} (14)	
1976	Fran Tarkenton^{†} (13) / Bob Lee (1)	
1977	Fran Tarkenton^{†} (9) / Bob Lee (4) / Tommy Kramer (1)	
1978^{[b]}	Fran Tarkenton^{†} (16)	
1979	Tommy Kramer (16)	
1980	Tommy Kramer (15) / Steve Dils (1)	
1981	Tommy Kramer (14) / Steve Dils (2)	
1982^{[c]}	Tommy Kramer (9)	
1983	Steve Dils (12) / Tommy Kramer (3) / Wade Wilson (1)	
1984	Tommy Kramer (9) / Wade Wilson (5) / Archie Manning (2)	
1985	Tommy Kramer (15) / Wade Wilson (1)	
1986	Tommy Kramer (13) / Wade Wilson (3)	
1987^{[c]}	Wade Wilson (7) / Tommy Kramer (5) / Tony Adams (3)	
1988	Wade Wilson (10) / Tommy Kramer (6)	
1989	Wade Wilson (12) / Tommy Kramer (4)	
1990	Rich Gannon (12) / Wade Wilson (4)	
1991	Rich Gannon (11) / Wade Wilson (5)	
1992	Rich Gannon (12) / Sean Salisbury (4)	
1993	Jim McMahon (12) / Sean Salisbury (4)	
1994	Warren Moon^{†} (15) / Sean Salisbury (1)	
1995	Warren Moon^{†} (16)	
1996	Warren Moon^{†} (8) / Brad Johnson (8)	
1997	Brad Johnson (13) / Randall Cunningham (3)	
1998	Randall Cunningham (14) / Brad Johnson (2)	
1999	Jeff George (10) / Randall Cunningham (6)	
2000	Daunte Culpepper (16)	
2001	Daunte Culpepper (11) / Todd Bouman (3) / Spergon Wynn (2)	
2002	Daunte Culpepper (16)	
2003	Daunte Culpepper (14) / Gus Frerotte (2)	
2004	Daunte Culpepper (16)	
2005	Brad Johnson (9) / Daunte Culpepper (7)	
2006	Brad Johnson (14) / Tarvaris Jackson (2)	
2007	Tarvaris Jackson (12) / Kelly Holcomb (3) / Brooks Bollinger (1)	
2008	Gus Frerotte (11) / Tarvaris Jackson (5)	
2009	Brett Favre^{†} (16)	
2010	Brett Favre^{†} (13) / Tarvaris Jackson (1) / Joe Webb (2)	
2011	Christian Ponder (10) / Donovan McNabb (6)	
2012	Christian Ponder (16)	
2013	Christian Ponder (9) / Matt Cassel (6) / Josh Freeman (1)	
2014	Teddy Bridgewater (12) / Matt Cassel (3) / Christian Ponder (1)	
2015	Teddy Bridgewater (16)	
2016	Sam Bradford (15) / Shaun Hill (1)	
2017	Case Keenum (14) / Sam Bradford (2)	
2018	Kirk Cousins (16)	
2019	Kirk Cousins (15) / Sean Mannion (1)	
2020	Kirk Cousins (16)	
2021	Kirk Cousins (16) / Sean Mannion (1)	
2022	Kirk Cousins (17)	
2023	Kirk Cousins (8) / Joshua Dobbs (4) / Nick Mullens (3) / Jaren Hall (2)	
2024	Sam Darnold (17)	
2025	J. J. McCarthy (10) / Carson Wentz (5) / Max Brosmer (2)	
2026	Kyler Murray (6) / Carson Wentz (2) / Kirk Cousins (ongoing)	

=== Postseason ===
Season	Quarterback(s)	Ref(s).
1968	Joe Kapp (0–1)	
1969	Joe Kapp (2–1)	
1970	Gary Cuozzo (0–1)	
1971	Bob Lee (0–1)	
1973	Fran Tarkenton (2–1)	
1974	Fran Tarkenton (2–1)	
1975	Fran Tarkenton (0–1)	
1976	Fran Tarkenton (2–1)	
1977	Bob Lee (1–1)	
1978	Fran Tarkenton (0–1)	
1980	Tommy Kramer (0–1)	
1982	Tommy Kramer (1–1)	
1987	Tommy Kramer (1–0) / Wade Wilson (1–1)	
1988	Wade Wilson (1–1)	
1989	Wade Wilson (0–1)	
1992	Sean Salisbury (0–1)	
1993	Jim McMahon (0–1)	
1994	Warren Moon (0–1)	
1996	Brad Johnson (0–1)	
1997	Randall Cunningham (1–1)	
1998	Randall Cunningham (1–1)	
1999	Jeff George (1–1)	
2000	Daunte Culpepper (1–1)	
2004	Daunte Culpepper (1–1)	
2008	Tarvaris Jackson (0–1)	
2009	Brett Favre (1–1)	
2012	Joe Webb (0–1)	
2015	Teddy Bridgewater (0–1)	
2017	Case Keenum (1–1)	
2019	Kirk Cousins (1–1)	
2022	Kirk Cousins (0–1)	
2024	Sam Darnold (0–1)	

== Statistics ==
Having been the franchise's starting quarterback for 13 seasons (longer than any other Vikings player), Fran Tarkenton holds the record for the most starts in a Vikings jersey, and those for the most wins and ties. He is also the franchise's leading passer in terms of numbers of attempts, completions, total yards gained and passing touchdowns, although Brett Favre has the best pass completion percentage. However, Tarkenton has also thrown the most interceptions. The record for the longest completed pass by a Vikings starting quarterback is held by Gus Frerotte, who threw a 99-yard touchdown pass to wide receiver Bernard Berrian in a home game against the Chicago Bears in the 2008 season.

Tarkenton is also the franchise leader for rushing attempts and rushing yards as a quarterback, but it is Daunte Culpepper – with 72 fewer rushing yards on 10 fewer attempts than Tarkenton – who has the most rushing touchdowns. Joe Webb holds the record for the longest rush with a 65-yard run in Minnesota's 34–28 road loss to the Detroit Lions in 2011.

Years	Years that the quarterback was on the Vikings' roster	Yds	Yards gained by passing
GP	Games played (regular season)	TD	Passing touchdowns
GS	Games started (regular season)	Int	Interceptions thrown
W	Number of wins as starting quarterback	Lng	Longest completed pass thrown (yards)
L	Number of losses as starting quarterback	Rate	Quarterback rating
T	Number of ties as starting quarterback	Att	Rushes attempted
Cmp	Passes completed	Yds	Yards gained by rushing
Att	Passes attempted	TD	Rushing touchdowns
Cmp%	Percentage of passes completed	Lng	Longest rushing attempt

Name	Years	Passing statistics													Rushing statistics				Ref.
Name	Years	GP	GS	W	L	T	Cmp	Att	Cmp%	Yds	TD	Int	Lng	Rate	Att	Yds	TD	Lng	Ref.
George Shaw	1961	8	4	1	3	0	46	91	50.5	530	4	4	42	64.8	10	39	0	19	
Fran Tarkenton	1961–1966; 1972–1978	177	170	91	73	6	2,635	4,569	57.7	33,098	239	194	89	80.1	464	2,548	22	52	
Ron Vander Kelen	1963–1967	29	5	1	4	0	107	252	42.5	1,375	6	11	53	50.0	26	116	1	20	
Bob Berry	1965–1967; 1973–1975	24	2	1	1	0	63	124	50.8	708	7	8	52	60.1	7	25	0	8	
Joe Kapp	1967–1969	40	38	23	12	3	351	699	50.2	4,807	37	47	85	62.2	99	540	5	27	
Gary Cuozzo	1968–1971	33	21	16	5	0	276	556	49.6	3,552	18	23	72	63.6	36	85	0	15	
Bob Lee	1969–1972; 1975–1978	52	11	9	2	0	159	306	52.0	2,153	15	17	63	67.9	39	37	2	10	
Norm Snead	1971	7	2	2	0	0	37	75	49.3	470	1	6	55	40.4	6	6	1	5	
Tommy Kramer	1977–1989	128	110	54	56	0	2,011	3,648	55.1	24,775	159	157	76	72.9	214	531	8	20	
Steve Dils	1979–1984	47	15	6	9	0	336	623	53.9	3,867	15	18	68	68.9	24	73	0	19	
Wade Wilson	1981–1991	76	48	27	21	0	929	1,665	55.8	12,135	66	75	75	73.4	159	679	9	38	
Archie Manning	1983–1984	8	2	0	2	0	52	94	55.3	545	2	3	56	66.1	12	41	0	16	
Tony Adams	1987	3	3	0	3	0	49	89	55.1	607	3	5	63	64.2	11	31	0	12	
Rich Gannon	1987–1992	48	35	19	16	0	561	1,003	55.9	6,457	40	36	78	73.9	144	720	3	42	
Sean Salisbury	1992–1994	22	9	5	4	0	228	404	56.4	2,772	14	9	55	80.0	24	1	0	6	
Jim McMahon	1993	12	12	8	4	0	200	331	60.4	1,968	9	8	58	76.2	33	96	0	16	
Warren Moon	1994–1996	39	39	21	18	0	882	1,454	60.7	10,102	58	42	85	82.8	69	143	0	16	
Brad Johnson	1994–1998; 2005–2006	68	46	28	18	0	1,036	1,670	62.0	11,098	65	48	82	82.5	139	368	2	28	
Randall Cunningham	1997–1999	27	23	16	7	0	427	713	59.9	5,680	48	23	67	94.2	61	317	1	28	
Jeff George	1999	12	10	8	2	0	191	329	58.1	2,816	23	12	80	94.2	16	41	0	17	
Daunte Culpepper	1999–2005	81	80	38	42	0	1,678	2,607	64.4	20,162	135	86	82	91.5	454	2,476	29	42	
Todd Bouman	2001–2002	6	3	1	2	0	54	95	56.8	880	8	4	80	98.6	10	70	0	21	
Spergon Wynn	2001	3	2	0	2	0	48	98	49.0	418	1	6	47	38.6	8	61	0	14	
Gus Frerotte	2003–2004; 2008	43	13	10	3	0	216	367	58.9	2,847	19	17	99	81.4	31	5	1	5	
Tarvaris Jackson	2006–2010	36	20	10	10	0	354	603	58.7	3,984	24	22	71	76.6	119	535	4	33	
Kelly Holcomb	2007	3	3	0	3	0	42	83	50.6	515	2	1	40	73.1	0	0	0	0	
Brooks Bollinger	2006–2007	7	1	0	1	0	46	68	67.6	537	1	2	50	84.0	5	18	0	10	
Brett Favre	2009–2010	29	29	17	12	0	580	889	65.2	6,711	44	26	63	92.2	26	15	0	10	
Joe Webb	2010–2013	17	2	1	1	0	88	152	57.9	853	3	5	46	66.6	41	273	4	65	
Donovan McNabb	2011	6	6	1	5	0	94	156	60.3	1,026	4	2	60	82.9	14	59	1	23	
Christian Ponder	2011–2014	38	36	14	21	1	632	1,057	59.8	6,658	38	36	72	75.9	126	639	7	29	
Matt Cassel	2013–2014	12	9	4	5	0	194	325	59.7	2,232	14	13	79	78.1	27	75	1	13	
Josh Freeman	2013	1	1	0	1	0	20	53	37.7	190	0	1	22	40.6	0	0	0	0	
Teddy Bridgewater	2014–2017	30	28	17	11	0	551	851	64.7	6,150	28	22	87	86.3	94	398	4	19	
Shaun Hill	2016	7	1	1	0	0	21	42	50.0	257	0	0	33	69.2	11	−2	0	9	
Sam Bradford	2016–2017	17	17	9	8	0	427	595	71.8	4,259	23	5	71	101.1	22	50	0	24	
Case Keenum	2017	15	14	11	3	0	325	481	67.6	3,547	22	7	65	98.3	40	160	1	22	
Kirk Cousins	2018–2023	88	88	50	37	1	2,093	3,081	67.9	23,265	171	55	75	101.2	181	579	6	29	
Sean Mannion	2019; 2021	4	2	0	2	0	34	57	59.6	315	1	2	35	66.0	8	9	0	11	
Jaren Hall	2023	3	2	1	1	0	13	20	65.0	168	0	1	47	70.4	6	14	0	8	
Joshua Dobbs	2023	5	4	2	2	0	95	151	62.9	895	5	5	29	76.4	30	163	3	22	
Nick Mullens	2023–2024	12	3	0	3	0	123	175	70.3	1,568	8	9	47	91.8	14	33	0	6	
Sam Darnold	2024	17	17	14	3	0	361	545	66.2	4,319	35	12	97	102.5	67	212	1	19	
**J. J. McCarthy**	2025–present	10	10	6	4	0	140	243	57.6	1,632	11	12	62	72.6	37	181	4	26	
**Carson Wentz**	2025–present	7	6	3	3	0	133	208	63.9	1,492	9	5	81	89.7	19	62	0	16	
Max Brosmer	2025–present	7	2	1	1	0	47	71	66.2	328	0	4	29	53.0	7	11	0	11	
**Kyler Murray**	2026–present	1	1	1	0	0	3	5	60.0	18	0	1	9	27.5	2	9	0	7	

* Statistics accurate as of the 2026 season.
Bold text indicates the player is currently on the Vikings roster

== Notes ==
- ^{a} In each game, a team picks one player to start in the quarterback position. Players may be substituted during the game, but the term "starting quarterback" refers to the player who started the game in that position.
- ^{b} Since the 1978 NFL season, all teams have played 16-game schedules.
- ^{c} Strikes by the National Football League Players Association in the 1982 and 1987 seasons resulted in shortened seasons (9- and 15-game schedules, respectively).
