= 2003 Minnesota Vikings season =

NFL team season

- Head coach: Mike Tice
- Home stadium: Hubert H. Humphrey Metrodome

Results
- Record: 9–7
- Division place: 2nd NFC North
- Playoffs: Did not qualify
- All-Pros: 2: C Matt Birk (2nd team); WR Randy Moss (1st team)
- Pro Bowlers: 4: C Matt Birk; FS Corey Chavous; QB Daunte Culpepper; WR Randy Moss (injured)

Uniform
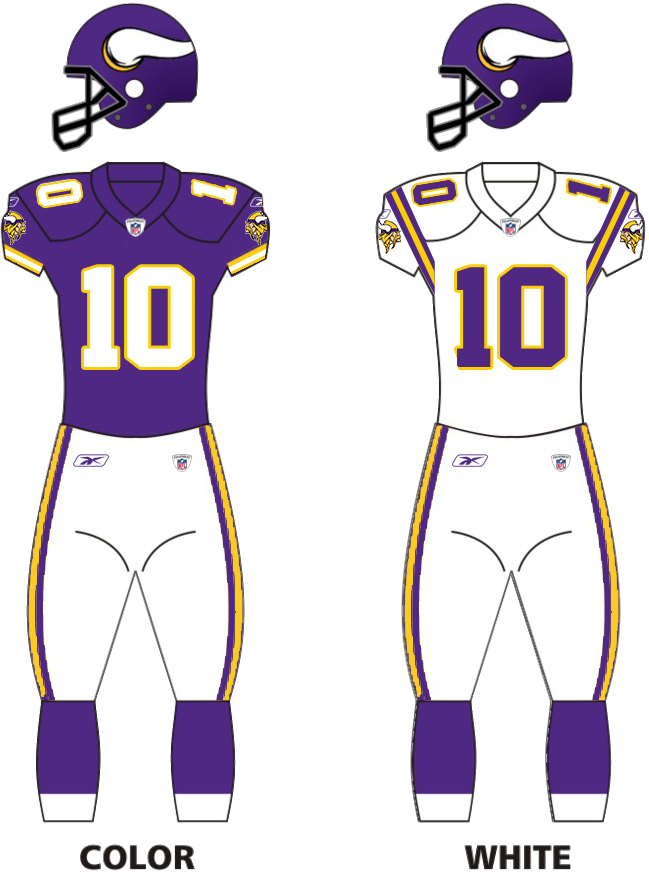

The 2003 season was the Minnesota Vikings' 43rd in the National Football League (NFL). They finished second in the NFC North with a 9–7 record, behind the 10–6 Green Bay Packers, but missed the playoffs for a third straight year. Despite gaining 6,294 yards of offense over their 16 games, by far the most in the league, the team managed just 416 points, the sixth-most in the NFL. The Vikings won their first six games of the 2003 season, then lost their next four games, after which they alternated wins and losses for the remainder of the season. The Vikings were officially eliminated from postseason contention with a loss to the Arizona Cardinals on the last play of their final game.

Wide receiver Randy Moss led the NFL with 17 touchdown receptions, the third time in his career that he led the league in that category. After two seasons of inconsistency, rejuvenated quarterback Daunte Culpepper was voted to play in the second Pro Bowl of his career at the end of the season.

== Offseason ==
Additions	Subtractions
QB Gus Frerotte (Bengals)	QB Todd Bouman (Saints)
T Mike Rosenthal (Giants)	DE Lorenzo Bromell (Raiders)
LB Chris Claiborne (Lions)	CB Tyrone Carter (Jets)
CB Ken Irvin (Saints)	FB Harold Morrow (Ravens)
CB Denard Walker (Broncos)	

=== 2003 draft ===
Pro Bowler

2003 Minnesota Vikings draft
Draft order		Player name	Position	College	Notes
Round	Overall	Player name	Position	College	Notes
1	9	Kevin Williams	Defensive tackle	Oklahoma State	In lieu of #7 (time expired) (Note: While attempting to agree a trade, the Vikings' time elapsed, allowing the Jacksonville Jaguars to move up and select QB Byron Leftwich. The Carolina Panthers were also able to select OT Jordan Gross before the Vikings ultimately made their selection.)
2	40	E. J. Henderson	Linebacker	Maryland	
3	71	Nate Burleson	Wide receiver	Nevada	
4	105	Onterrio Smith	Running back	Oregon	
5	142	Traded to the Cleveland Browns (Note: The Vikings traded their fifth-round selection (142nd overall) to the Browns in exchange for DT Stalin Colinet.)			
6	180	Eddie Johnson	Punter	Idaho State	
6	190	Mike Nattiel	Linebacker	Florida	From Saints (Note: The Vikings traded QB Todd Bouman to the Saints in exchange for a sixth-round selection (190th overall).)
7	221	Keenan Howry	Wide receiver	Oregon	

=== Undrafted free agents ===
2003 undrafted free agents of note
Player	Position	College
Kane Anderson	Defensive end	New Hampshire
Sean Berton	Tight end	NC State
LaWaylon Brown	Defensive tackle	Oklahoma State
Colin Cole	Defensive tackle	Iowa
Robbie Doane	Tackle	Texas
Steve Farmer	Tight end	Tennessee State
Adam Goldberg	Tackle	Wyoming
Rushen Jones	Cornerback	Vanderbilt
Juston Wood	Quarterback	Portland State

== Staff ==
2003 Minnesota Vikings staff
Front office: Owner – Red McCombs; President – Gary Woods; Vice president of football operations – Rob Brzezinski; Head coaches: Head coach – Mike Tice; Offensive coaches: Offensive coordinator/quarterbacks – Scott Linehan; Running backs – Dean Dalton; Wide receivers – Charlie Baggett; Tight ends/assistant offensive line – John Tice; Offensive line – Steve Loney; Offensive quality control – Randy Hanson	Defensive coaches: Defensive coordinator/defensive line – George O'Leary; Linebackers – Brian Baker; Secondary – Chuck Knox Jr.; Assistant secondary – Kevin Ross; Defensive assistant/assistant defensive line – Pete Bercich; Defensive quality control – Jim Panagos; Special teams coaches: Special teams – Rusty Tillman; Strength and conditioning: Strength and conditioning – Steve Wetzel; Assistant strength and conditioning – Daryl Lawrence

== Roster ==
2003 Minnesota Vikings roster
Quarterbacks (QB): 11 Daunte Culpepper; 12 Gus Frerotte; 13 Shaun Hill; Running backs (RB): 23 Michael Bennett; 29 Larry Ned; 32 Onterrio Smith KR; 45 Charles Stackhouse FB; 20 Moe Williams; Wide receivers (WR): 85 D'Wayne Bates; 81 Nate Burleson; 16 Kelly Campbell; 82 Keenan Howry; 84 Randy Moss; Tight ends (TE): 47 Richard Angulo; 45 Sean Berton; 83 Hunter Goodwin; 40 Jim Kleinsasser	Offensive linemen (OL): 78 Matt Birk C; 71 David Dixon G; 61 Lewis Kelly G/T; 62 Everett Lindsay G/T; 76 Chris Liwienski G; 74 Bryant McKinnie T; 75 Mike Rosenthal T; 60 Cory Withrow C; Defensive linemen (DL): 99 Chris Hovan DT; 51 Lance Johnstone DE; 96 Billy Lyon DT; 79 Kenny Mixon DE; 98 Fred Robbins DT; 97 Talance Sawyer DE; 94 Chuck Wiley DE; 93 Kevin Williams DE/DT	Linebackers (LB): 54 Greg Biekert MLB; 55 Chris Claiborne OLB; 52 Henri Crockett OLB; 56 E. J. Henderson MLB; 59 Mike Nattiel OLB; 58 Nick Rogers OLB; 57 Raonall Smith OLB; Defensive backs (DB): 21 Corey Chavous SS; 22 Ken Irvin CB; 31 Rushen Jones CB; 25 Eric Kelly CB; 38 Rhett Nelson CB; 24 Willie Offord SS; 27 Brian Russell FS; 26 Denard Walker CB; 29 Brian Williams CB; Special teams (ST): 2 Leo Araguz P; 8 Aaron Elling K; 4 Eddie Johnson P; 43 Brody Liddiard LS	Practice squad: 89 Kenny Clark WR; 73 Adam Goldberg T; 72 Adam Haayer T; 35 Horace Willis CB; 50 Max Yates LB; Reserve: 33 John Avery (IR); 42 Jack Brewer S (IR); 48 Steve Farmer TE (IR); Rookies in italics 53 active, 3 reserve, 5 practice squad

== Preseason ==
=== Schedule ===
Week	Date	Opponent	Result	Record	Venue	Attendance	NFL.com recap
1	August 9	Jacksonville Jaguars	L 14–16	0–1	Hubert H. Humphrey Metrodome	63,370	Recap
2	August 16	at Kansas City Chiefs	L 16–26	0–2	Arrowhead Stadium	75,634	Recap
3	August 22	at Oakland Raiders	W 21–6	1–2	Network Associates Coliseum	37,411	Recap
4	August 28	Arizona Cardinals	L 27–31	1–3	Hubert H. Humphrey Metrodome	63,473	Recap

=== Game summaries ===
==== Week 1: vs. Jacksonville Jaguars ====
Week 1: Jacksonville Jaguars at Minnesota Vikings – Game summary

Quarter	1	2	3	4	Total
Jaguars	0	13	0	3	16
Vikings	7	0	7	0	14

at Hubert H. Humphrey Metrodome, Minneapolis, Minnesota

- Date: August 9
- Game time: 7:00 p.m. CDT
- Game weather: None (indoor stadium)
- Game attendance: 63,370
- Referee: Tony Corrente (99)
- Recap, Game Book

Game information

First quarter

- MIN – D'Wayne Bates 13-yard pass from Daunte Culpepper (Hayden Epstein kick), 2:47. Vikings 7–0. Drive: 11 plays, 80 yards, 5:40.

Second quarter

- JAX – Seth Marler 29-yard field goal, 4:19. Vikings 7–3. Drive: 9 plays, 45 yards, 4:10.
- JAX – Ike Charlton 97-yard fumble return (James Tuthill kick), 0:52. Jaguars 10–7.
- JAX – Danny Boyd 32-yard field goal, 0:00. Jaguars 13–7. Drive: 5 plays, 12 yards, 0:36.

Third quarter

- MIN – Onterrio Smith 1-yard run (Aaron Elling kick), 0:40. Vikings 14–13. Drive: 18 plays, 69 yards, 10:08.

Fourth quarter

- JAX – Seth Marler 43-yard field goal, 11:55. Jaguars 16–14. Drive: 7 plays, 38 yards, 3:45.

Top passers

- JAX – Mark Brunell – 10/13, 110 yards
- MIN – Shaun Hill – 7/11, 63 yards

Top rushers

- JAX – LaBrandon Toefield – 8 rushes, 33 yards
- MIN – Onterrio Smith – 12 rushes, 33 yards, TD

Top receivers

- JAX – Jimmy Smith – 5 receptions, 70 yards
- MIN – Randy Moss – 2 receptions, 25 yards

==== Week 2: at Kansas City Chiefs ====
Week 2: Minnesota Vikings at Kansas City Chiefs – Game summary

Quarter	1	2	3	4	Total
Vikings	7	3	0	6	16
Chiefs	3	13	3	7	26

at Arrowhead Stadium, Kansas City, Missouri

- Date: August 16
- Game time: 7:30 p.m. CDT
- Game weather: Clear, 100 °F (38 °C)
- Game attendance: 75,634
- Referee: Bill Leavy (127)
- Recap, Game Book

Game information

First quarter

- KC – Morten Andersen 38-yard field goal, 11:58. Chiefs 3–0. Drive: 10 plays, 38 yards, 3:02.
- MIN – Onterrio Smith 1-yard run (Todd France kick), 8:15. Vikings 7–3. Drive: 4 plays, 14 yards, 1:46.

Second quarter

- KC – Morten Andersen 21-yard field goal, 11:31. Vikings 7–6. Drive: 12 plays, 83 yards, 5:29.
- KC – Marc Boerigter 59-yard pass from Trent Green (Morten Andersen kick), 8:38. Chiefs 13–7. Drive: 2 plays, 76 yards, 0:34.
- MIN – Aaron Elling 48-yard field goal, 1:07. Chiefs 13–10. Drive: 7 plays, 31 yards, 1:57.
- KC – Morten Andersen 42-yard field goal, 0:00. Chiefs 16–10. Drive: 7 plays, 52 yards, 1:07.

Third quarter

- KC – José Cortez 46-yard field goal, 2:27. Chiefs 19–10. Drive: 7 plays, 54 yards, 3:07.

Fourth quarter

- KC – Dwayne Blakley 12-yard pass from Todd Collins (José Cortez kick), 10:48. Chiefs 26–10. Drive: 2 plays, 47 yards, 0:50.
- MIN – Nate Burleson 1-yard pass from Shaun Hill (pass failed), 4:18. Chiefs 26–16. Drive: 6 plays, 43 yards, 3:01.

Top passers

- MIN – Daunte Culpepper – 8/13, 68 yards
- KC – Trent Green – 7/13, 152 yards, TD

Top rushers

- MIN – Doug Chapman – 6 rushes, 34 yards
- KC – Derrick Blaylock – 6 rushes, 48 yards

Top receivers

- MIN – Nate Burleson – 6 receptions, 56 yards, TD
- KC – Marc Boerigter – 2 receptions, 85 yards, TD

==== Week 3: at Oakland Raiders ====
Week 3: Minnesota Vikings at Oakland Raiders – Game summary

Quarter	1	2	3	4	Total
Vikings	7	7	7	0	21
Raiders	0	3	3	0	6

at Network Associates Coliseum, Oakland, California

- Date: August 22
- Game time: 6:00 p.m. PDT
- Game weather: Clear, 73 °F (23 °C)
- Game attendance: 37,411
- Referee: Pete Morelli (135)
- Recap, Game Book

Game information

First quarter

- MIN – Randy Moss 5-yard pass from Daunte Culpepper (Aaron Elling kick), 4:41. Vikings 7–0. Drive: 8 plays, 75 yards, 4:35.

Second quarter

- OAK – Sebastian Janikowski 20-yard field goal, 14:11. Vikings 7–3. Drive: 13 plays, 48 yards, 5:30.
- MIN – Randy Moss 1-yard pass from Daunte Culpepper (Aaron Elling kick), 0:24. Vikings 14–3. Drive: 7 plays, 41 yards, 2:28.

Third quarter

- MIN – Onterrio Smith 5-yard run (Aaron Elling kick), 10:03. Vikings 21–3. Drive: 7 plays, 49 yards, 3:38.
- OAK – Joe O'Donnell 33-yard field goal, 0:15. Vikings 21–6. Drive: 7 plays, 58 yards, 3:12.

Fourth quarter

- No scoring plays.

Top passers

- MIN – Daunte Culpepper – 13/22, 141 yards, 2 TD
- OAK – Rich Gannon – 9/18, 107 yards

Top rushers

- MIN – John Avery – 13 rushes, 52 yards
- OAK – Ronney Jenkins – 6 rushes, 44 yards

Top receivers

- MIN – Randy Moss – 5 receptions, 36 yards, 2 TD
- OAK – Teyo Johnson – 2 receptions, 55 yards

==== Week 4: vs. Arizona Cardinals ====
Week 4: Arizona Cardinals at Minnesota Vikings – Game summary

Quarter	1	2	3	4	Total
Cardinals	3	7	14	7	31
Vikings	3	10	7	7	27

at Hubert H. Humphrey Metrodome, Minneapolis, Minnesota

- Date: August 28
- Game time: 7:05 p.m. CDT
- Game weather: None (indoor stadium)
- Game attendance: 63,473
- Referee: Bernie Kukar (86)
- Recap, Game Book

Game information

First quarter

- ARI – Bill Gramática 47-yard field goal, 8:10. Cardinals 3–0. Drive: 12 plays, 38 yards, 6:50.
- MIN – Aaron Elling 52-yard field goal, 2:29. Tied 3–3. Drive: 11 plays, 38 yards, 5:41.

Second quarter

- MIN – Nate Burleson 27-yard pass from Daunte Culpepper (Aaron Elling kick), 11:07. Vikings 10–3. Drive: 8 plays, 84 yards, 2:56.
- ARI – Damien Anderson 69-yard run (Bill Gramática kick), 10:51. Tied 10–10. Drive: 1 play, 69 yards, 0:16.
- MIN – Aaron Elling 28-yard field goal, 0:50. Vikings 13–10. Drive: 8 plays, 60 yards, 2:03.

Third quarter

- MIN – Sean Berton 4-yard pass from Gus Frerotte (Aaron Elling kick), 11:32. Vikings 20–10. Drive: 6 plays, 60 yards, 3:28.
- ARI – Preston Parsons 11-yard run (Tim Duncan kick), 8:48. Vikings 20–17. Drive: 6 plays, 70 yards, 2:44.
- ARI – Bryant Johnson 20-yard pass from Preston Parsons (Bill Gramática kick), 1:27. Cardinals 24–20. Drive: 7 plays, 63 yards, 4:00.

Fourth quarter

- MIN – Larry Ned 1-yard run (Aaron Elling kick), 12:03. Vikings 27–24. Drive: 10 plays, 62 yards, 4:24.
- ARI – Preston Parsons 1-yard run (Tim Duncan kick), 7:35. Cardinals 31–27. Drive: 9 plays, 72 yards, 4:28.

Top passers

- ARI – Preston Parsons – 13/16, 156 yards, TD
- MIN – Gus Frerotte – 10/15, 166 yards, TD

Top rushers

- ARI – Damien Anderson – 5 rushes, 119 yards, TD
- MIN – John Avery – 4 rushes, 12 yards

Top receivers

- ARI – Bryant Johnson – 5 receptions, 65 yards, TD
- MIN – Kenny Clark – 4 receptions, 47 yards

== Regular season ==
=== Schedule ===
Week	Date	Opponent	Result	Record	Venue	Attendance	NFL.com recap
1	September 7	at Green Bay Packers	W 30–25	1–0	Lambeau Field	70,505	Recap
2	September 14	Chicago Bears	W 24–13	2–0	Hubert H. Humphrey Metrodome	64,144	Recap
3	September 21	at Detroit Lions	W 23–13	3–0	Ford Field	60,865	Recap
4	September 28	San Francisco 49ers	W 35–7	4–0	Hubert H. Humphrey Metrodome	64,111	Recap
5	October 5	at Atlanta Falcons	W 39–26	5–0	Georgia Dome	70,427	Recap
6	Bye week						
7	October 19	Denver Broncos	W 28–20	6–0	Hubert H. Humphrey Metrodome	64,381	Recap
8	October 26	New York Giants	L 17–29	6–1	Hubert H. Humphrey Metrodome	64,114	Recap
9	November 2	Green Bay Packers	L 27–30	6–2	Hubert H. Humphrey Metrodome	64,482	Recap
10	November 9	at San Diego Chargers	L 28–42	6–3	Qualcomm Stadium	64,738	Recap
11	November 16	at Oakland Raiders	L 18–28	6–4	Oakland–Alameda County Coliseum	56,653	Recap
12	November 23	Detroit Lions	W 24–14	7–4	Hubert H. Humphrey Metrodome	63,946	Recap
13	November 30	at St. Louis Rams	L 17–48	7–5	Edward Jones Dome	66,134	Recap
14	December 7	Seattle Seahawks	W 34–7	8–5	Hubert H. Humphrey Metrodome	63,968	Recap
15	December 14	at Chicago Bears	L 10–13	8–6	Soldier Field	61,804	Recap
16	December 20	Kansas City Chiefs	W 45–20	9–6	Hubert H. Humphrey Metrodome	64,291	Recap
17	December 28	at Arizona Cardinals	L 17–18	9–7	Sun Devil Stadium	52,734	Recap

=== Game summaries ===
==== Week 1: at Green Bay Packers ====
Week 1: Minnesota Vikings at Green Bay Packers – Game summary

Quarter	1	2	3	4	Total
Vikings	10	10	7	3	30
Packers	0	3	8	14	25

at Lambeau Field, Green Bay, Wisconsin

- Date: September 7
- Game time: 12:00 p.m. CDT
- Game weather: Mostly sunny, 71 °F (22 °C)
- Game attendance: 70,505
- Referee: Pete Morelli (135)
- Recap, Game Book

Game information

First quarter

- MIN – John Avery 11-yard pass from Daunte Culpepper (Aaron Elling kick), 9:28. Vikings 7–0. Drive: 10 plays, 76 yards, 5:32.
- MIN – Aaron Elling 22-yard field goal, 1:52. Vikings 10–0. Drive: 10 plays, 45 yards, 4:34.

Second quarter

- GB – Ryan Longwell 27-yard field goal, 11:02. Vikings 10–3. Drive: 7 plays, 41 yards, 3:12.
- MIN – D'Wayne Bates 2-yard pass from Daunte Culpepper (Aaron Elling kick), 5:34. Vikings 17–3. Drive: 10 plays, 67 yards, 5:28.
- MIN – Aaron Elling 46-yard field goal, 0:04. Vikings 20–3. Drive: 2 plays, 0 yards, 0:13.

Third quarter

- MIN – Randy Moss 13-yard pass from Daunte Culpepper (Aaron Elling kick), 8:47. Vikings 27–3. Drive: 7 plays, 59 yards, 3:09.
- GB – Ahman Green 8-yard run (Brett Favre–Bubba Franks pass), 1:30. Vikings 27–11. Drive: 14 plays, 78 yards, 7:17.

Fourth quarter

- MIN – Aaron Elling 34-yard field goal, 10:07. Vikings 30–11. Drive: 11 plays, 64 yards, 6:23.
- GB – Ahman Green 1-yard run (Ryan Longwell kick), 6:27. Vikings 30–18. Drive: 10 plays, 74 yards, 3:40.
- GB – Javon Walker 24-yard pass from Brett Favre (Ryan Longwell kick), 1:55. Vikings 30–25. Drive: 3 plays, 41 yards, 0:29.

Top passers

- MIN – Daunte Culpepper – 15/30, 195 yards, 3 TD
- GB – Brett Favre – 25/41, 248 yards, TD, 4 INT

Top rushers

- MIN – Moe Williams – 22 rushes, 80 yards
- GB – Ahman Green – 15 rushes, 53 yards, 2 TD

Top receivers

- MIN – Randy Moss – 9 receptions, 150 yards, TD
- GB – Javon Walker – 5 receptions, 84 yards, TD

==== Week 2: vs. Chicago Bears ====
Week 2: Chicago Bears at Minnesota Vikings – Game summary

Quarter	1	2	3	4	Total
Bears	3	7	3	0	13
Vikings	7	10	0	7	24

at Hubert H. Humphrey Metrodome, Minneapolis, Minnesota

- Date: September 14
- Game time: 7:30 p.m. CDT
- Game weather: None (indoor stadium)
- Game attendance: 64,144
- Referee: Mike Carey (94)
- Recap, Game Book

Game information

First quarter

- MIN – Moe Williams 1-yard run (Aaron Elling kick), 13:57. Vikings 7–0. Drive: 3 plays, 56 yards, 1:03.
- CHI – Paul Edinger 42-yard field goal, 10:35. Vikings 7–3. Drive: 6 plays, 33 yards, 3:22.

Second quarter

- MIN – Aaron Elling 23-yard field goal, 11:18. Vikings 10–3. Drive: 8 plays, 33 yards, 3:23.
- MIN – Jim Kleinsasser 3-yard pass from Daunte Culpepper (Aaron Elling kick), 1:55. Vikings 17–3. Drive: 12 plays, 92 yards, 7:12.
- CHI – David Terrell 14-yard pass from Kordell Stewart (Paul Edinger kick), 0:39. Vikings 17–10. Drive: 8 plays, 60 yards, 1:16.

Third quarter

- CHI – Paul Edinger 43-yard field goal, 4:43. Vikings 17–13. Drive: 7 plays, 42 yards, 4:53.

Fourth quarter

- MIN – Jim Kleinsasser 11-yard pass from Daunte Culpepper (Aaron Elling kick), 2:56. Vikings 24–13. Drive: 16 plays, 93 yards, 9:42.

Top passers

- CHI – Kordell Stewart – 13/21, 137 yards, TD
- MIN – Daunte Culpepper – 20/26, 214 yards, 2 TD

Top rushers

- CHI – Anthony Thomas – 10 rushes, 53 yards
- MIN – Moe Williams – 21 rushes, 108 yards, TD

Top receivers

- CHI – Dez White – 3 receptions, 67 yards
- MIN – Kelly Campbell – 2 receptions, 53 yards

==== Week 3: at Detroit Lions ====
Week 3: Minnesota Vikings at Detroit Lions – Game summary

Quarter	1	2	3	4	Total
Vikings	0	16	7	0	23
Lions	10	0	3	0	13

at Ford Field, Detroit, Michigan

- Date: September 21
- Game time: 12:00 p.m. CDT/1:00 p.m. EDT
- Game weather: None (indoor stadium)
- Game attendance: 60,865
- Referee: Tom White (123)
- Recap, Game Book

Game information

First quarter

- DET – Shawn Bryson 5-yard run (Jason Hanson kick), 11:00. Lions 7–0. Drive: 7 plays, 59 yards, 4:00.
- DET – Jason Hanson 27-yard field goal, 0:52. Lions 10–0. Drive: 7 plays, 16 yards, 2:52.

Second quarter

- MIN – Daunte Culpepper 14-yard run (kick aborted), 12:02. Lions 10–6. Drive: 3 plays, 36 yards, 0:57.
- MIN – Daunte Culpepper 2-yard run (Aaron Elling kick), 4:57. Vikings 13–10. Drive: 6 plays, 98 yards, 2:51.
- MIN – Aaron Elling 21-yard field goal, 0:05. Vikings 16–10. Drive: 6 plays, 77 yards, 0:38.

Third quarter

- DET – Jason Hanson 37-yard field goal, 10:21. Vikings 16–13. Drive: 8 plays, 39 yards, 4:21.
- MIN – Kelly Campbell 72-yard pass from Gus Frerotte (Aaron Elling kick), 7:52. Vikings 23–13. Drive: 6 plays, 85 yards, 2:29.

Fourth quarter

- No scoring plays.

Top passers

- MIN – Gus Frerotte – 8/19, 184 yards, TD, INT
- DET – Joey Harrington – 24/42, 235 yards, 3 INT

Top rushers

- MIN – Moe Williams – 13 rushes, 95 yards
- DET – Shawn Bryson – 17 rushes, 49 yards, TD

Top receivers

- MIN – Kelly Campbell – 2 receptions, 85 yards, TD
- DET – Bill Schroeder – 4 receptions, 54 yards

==== Week 4: vs. San Francisco 49ers ====
Week 4: San Francisco 49ers at Minnesota Vikings – Game summary

Quarter	1	2	3	4	Total
49ers	0	0	0	7	7
Vikings	14	14	0	7	35

at Hubert H. Humphrey Metrodome, Minneapolis, Minnesota

- Date: September 28
- Game time: 12:00 p.m. CDT
- Game weather: None (indoor stadium)
- Game attendance: 64,111
- Referee: Larry Nemmers (20)
- Recap, Game Book

Game information

First quarter

- MIN – Randy Moss 15-yard pass from Gus Frerotte (Aaron Elling kick), 9:53. Vikings 7–0. Drive: 9 plays, 72 yards, 5:07.
- MIN – Onterrio Smith 5-yard run (Aaron Elling kick), 2:46. Vikings 14–0. Drive: 8 plays, 38 yards, 3:52.

Second quarter

- MIN – Randy Moss 35-yard pass from Gus Frerotte (Aaron Elling kick), 4:39. Vikings 21–0. Drive: 9 plays, 88 yards, 5:52.
- MIN – Nate Burleson 22-yard pass from Gus Frerotte (Aaron Elling kick), 0:56. Vikings 28–0. Drive: 5 plays, 56 yards, 0:56.

Third quarter

- No scoring plays.

Fourth quarter

- MIN – Randy Moss 59-yard pass from Gus Frerotte (Aaron Elling kick), 14:52. Vikings 35–0. Drive: 5 plays, 68 yards, 2:34.
- SF – Tai Streets 37-yard pass from Tim Rattay (Owen Pochman kick), 7:37. Vikings 35–7. Drive: 7 plays, 64 yards, 3:16.

Top passers

- SF – Tim Rattay – 12/18, 146 yards, TD
- MIN – Gus Frerotte – 16/21, 267 yards, 4 TD

Top rushers

- SF – Kevan Barlow – 11 rushes, 72 yards
- MIN – Onterrio Smith – 10 rushes, 43 yards, TD

Top receivers

- SF – Tai Streets – 4 receptions, 81 yards, TD
- MIN – Randy Moss – 8 receptions, 172 yards, 3 TD

==== Week 5: at Atlanta Falcons ====
Week 5: Minnesota Vikings at Atlanta Falcons – Game summary

Quarter	1	2	3	4	Total
Vikings	0	12	15	12	39
Falcons	6	14	0	6	26

at Georgia Dome, Atlanta, Georgia

- Date: October 5
- Game time: 12:00 p.m. CDT/1:00 p.m. EDT
- Game weather: None (indoor stadium)
- Game attendance: 70,427
- Referee: Ron Blum (7)
- Recap, Game Book

Game information

First quarter

- ATL – Jay Feely 34-yard field goal, 11:57. Falcons 3–0. Drive: 7 plays, 57 yards, 3:03.
- ATL – Jay Feely 33-yard field goal, 7:40. Falcons 6–0. Drive: 5 plays, 54 yards, 2:12.

Second quarter

- MIN – Randy Moss 32-yard pass from Gus Frerotte (Aaron Elling kick), 13:35. Vikings 7–6. Drive: 7 plays, 64 yards, 4:19.
- MIN – Penalty on Doug Johnson enforced in the end zone for a safety, 10:23. Vikings 9–6.
- MIN – Aaron Elling 32-yard field goal, 8:06. Vikings 12–6. Drive: 5 plays, 51 yards, 2:17.
- ATL – Warrick Dunn 8-yard run (Jay Feely kick), 6:56. Falcons 13–12. Drive: 2 plays, 76 yards, 1:10.
- ATL – Peerless Price 6-yard pass from Doug Johnson (Jay Feely kick), 0:10. Falcons 20–12. Drive: 9 plays, 44 yards, 4:26.

Third quarter

- MIN – Randy Moss 17-yard pass from Gus Frerotte (Gus Frerotte–Onterrio Smith pass), 7:34. Tied 20–20. Drive: 4 plays, 45 yards, 1:50.
- MIN – Moe Williams 11-yard run (Aaron Elling kick), 2:39. Vikings 27–20. Drive: 4 plays, 77 yards, 2:01.

Fourth quarter

- MIN – Moe Williams 5-yard run (Aaron Elling kick), 13:05. Vikings 34–20. Drive: 7 plays, 59 yards, 3:23.
- MIN – Penalty on Bob Whitfield enforced in the end zone for a safety, 11:38. Vikings 36–20.
- MIN – Aaron Elling 24-yard field goal, 2:52. Vikings 39–20. Drive: 4 plays, 6 yards, 1:41.
- ATL – Jimmy Farris 8-yard pass from Doug Johnson (pass failed), 1:43. Vikings 39–26. Drive: 5 plays, 55 yards, 1:09.

Top passers

- MIN – Gus Frerotte – 14/24, 239 yards, 2 TD, INT
- ATL – Doug Johnson – 28/40, 352 yards, 2 TD, 2 INT

Top rushers

- MIN – Moe Williams – 11 rushes, 71 yards, 2 TD
- ATL – T. J. Duckett – 11 rushes, 69 yards

Top receivers

- MIN – Randy Moss – 5 receptions, 81 yards, 2 TD
- ATL – Peerless Price – 12 receptions, 168 yards, TD

==== Week 7: vs. Denver Broncos ====
Week 7: Denver Broncos at Minnesota Vikings – Game summary

Quarter	1	2	3	4	Total
Broncos	0	7	3	10	20
Vikings	7	7	14	0	28

at Hubert H. Humphrey Metrodome, Minneapolis, Minnesota

- Date: October 19
- Game time: 12:00 p.m. CDT
- Game weather: None (indoor stadium)
- Game attendance: 64,381
- Referee: Bill Carollo (63)
- Recap, Game Book

Game information

First quarter

- MIN – Kelly Campbell 47-yard pass from Daunte Culpepper (Aaron Elling kick), 6:10. Vikings 7–0. Drive: 7 plays, 77 yards, 3:33.

Second quarter

- DEN – Clinton Portis 4-yard run (Jason Elam kick), 1:51. Tied 7–7. Drive: 9 plays, 83 yards, 5:16.
- MIN – Moe Williams 59-yard pass play by Daunte Culpepper (Aaron Elling kick), 0:00. Vikings 14–7. Drive: 6 plays, 81 yards, 1:51.

Third quarter

- MIN – Onterrio Smith 5-yard run (Aaron Elling kick), 9:24. Vikings 21–7. Drive: 10 plays, 71 yards, 5:36.
- MIN – Lance Johnstone 33-yard interception return (Aaron Elling kick), 7:57. Vikings 28–7.
- DEN – Jason Elam 46-yard field goal, 5:20. Vikings 28–10. Drive: 8 plays, 48 yards, 2:37.

Fourth quarter

- DEN – Jason Elam 46-yard field goal, 14:17. Vikings 28–13. Drive: 10 plays, 35 yards, 4:14.
- DEN – Mike Anderson 1-yard pass from Danny Kanell (Jason Elam kick), 6:45. Vikings 28–20. Drive: 12 plays, 61 yards, 4:38.

Top passers

- DEN – Steve Beuerlein – 9/19, 119 yards, 3 INT
- MIN – Daunte Culpepper – 19/26, 277 yards, 2 TD

Top rushers

- DEN – Clinton Portis – 25 rushes, 117 yards, TD
- MIN – Moe Williams – 14 rushes, 42 yards

Top receivers

- DEN – Shannon Sharpe – 7 receptions, 79 yards
- MIN – Randy Moss – 10 receptions, 151 yards

==== Week 8: vs. New York Giants ====
Week 8: New York Giants at Minnesota Vikings – Game summary

Quarter	1	2	3	4	Total
Giants	7	6	3	13	29
Vikings	3	7	7	0	17

at Hubert H. Humphrey Metrodome, Minneapolis, Minnesota

- Date: October 26
- Game time: 12:00 p.m. CDT
- Game weather: None (indoor stadium)
- Game attendance: 64,114
- Referee: Tony Corrente (99)
- Recap, Game Book

Game information

First quarter

- MIN – Aaron Elling 51-yard field goal, 10:12. Vikings 3–0. Drive: 8 plays, 40 yards, 4:48.
- NYG – Ike Hilliard 19-yard pass from Kerry Collins (Brett Conway kick), 7:19. Giants 7–3. Drive: 6 plays, 76 yards, 2:53.

Second quarter

- NYG – Brett Conway 20-yard field goal, 3:31. Giants 10–3. Drive: 7 plays, 54 yards, 3:12.
- MIN – Randy Moss 33-yard pass from Daunte Culpepper (Aaron Elling kick), 1:53. Tied 10–10. Drive: 4 plays, 79 yards, 1:38.
- NYG – Brett Conway 44-yard field goal, 0:04. Giants 13–10. Drive: 11 plays, 62 yards, 1:49.

Third quarter

- NYG – Brett Conway 37-yard field goal, 13:14. Giants 16–10. Drive: 5 plays, 53 yards, 1:46.
- MIN – Randy Moss 1-yard pass from Daunte Culpepper (Aaron Elling kick), 6:22. Vikings 17–16. Drive: 7 plays, 47 yards, 3:09.

Fourth quarter

- NYG – Tiki Barber 2-yard run (pass failed), 5:29. Giants 22–17. Drive: 6 plays, 80 yards, 2:58.
- NYG – Ike Hilliard 14-yard pass from Kerry Collins (Brett Conway kick), 3:39. Giants 29–17. Drive: 3 plays, 17 yards, 1:36.

Top passers

- NYG – Kerry Collins – 23/39, 375 yards, 2 TD, INT
- MIN – Daunte Culpepper – 18/31, 241 yards, 2 TD, 2 INT

Top rushers

- NYG – Tiki Barber – 20 rushes, 75 yards, TD
- MIN – Moe Williams – 11 rushes, 69 yards

Top receivers

- NYG – Ike Hilliard – 9 receptions, 100 yards, 2 TD
- MIN – Randy Moss – 7 receptions, 125 yards, 2 TD

==== Week 9: vs. Green Bay Packers ====
Week 9: Green Bay Packers at Minnesota Vikings – Game summary

Quarter	1	2	3	4	Total
Packers	6	14	0	10	30
Vikings	7	7	6	7	27

at Hubert H. Humphrey Metrodome, Minneapolis, Minnesota

- Date: November 2
- Game time: 7:35 p.m. CDT
- Game weather: None (indoor stadium)
- Game attendance: 64,482
- Referee: Bernie Kukar (86)
- Recap, Game Book

Game information

First quarter

- GB – Ryan Longwell 21-yard field goal, 11:14. Packers 3–0. Drive: 9 plays, 66 yards, 3:46.
- MIN – Randy Moss 43-yard pass from Daunte Culpepper (Aaron Elling kick), 8:33. Vikings 7–3. Drive: 5 plays, 71 yards, 2:41.
- GB – Ryan Longwell 43-yard field goal, 5:42. Vikings 7–6. Drive: 6 plays, 51 yards, 2:51.

Second quarter

- GB – Ahman Green 5-yard pass from Brett Favre (Ryan Longwell kick), 12:18. Packers 13–7. Drive: 7 plays, 82 yards, 3:23.
- MIN – Jim Kleinsasser 4-yard pass from Daunte Culpepper (Aaron Elling kick), 2:07. Vikings 14–13. Drive: 7 plays, 45 yards, 4:01.
- GB – Javon Walker 12-yard pass from Brett Favre (Ryan Longwell kick), 0:21. Packers 20–14. Drive: 7 plays, 73 yards, 1:46.

Third quarter

- MIN – Aaron Elling 47-yard field goal, 8:53. Packers 20–17. Drive: 12 plays, 48 yards, 6:07.
- MIN – Aaron Elling 37-yard field goal, 2:26. Tied 20–20. Drive: 10 plays, 39 yards, 5:09.

Fourth quarter

- GB – Javon Walker 12-yard pass from Brett Favre (Ryan Longwell kick), 13:14. Packers 27–20. Drive: 9 plays, 73 yards, 4:12.
- GB – Ryan Longwell 27-yard field goal, 2:37. Packers 30–20. Drive: 12 plays, 71 yards, 6:40.
- MIN – Daunte Culpepper 1-yard run (Aaron Elling kick), 0:33. Packers 30–27. Drive: 11 plays, 65 yards, 2:04.

Top passers

- GB – Brett Favre – 18/28, 194 yards, 3 TD, INT
- MIN – Daunte Culpepper – 21/34, 202 yards, 2 TD

Top rushers

- GB – Ahman Green – 21 rushes, 137 yards
- MIN – Moe Williams – 12 rushes, 63 yards

Top receivers

- GB – Ahman Green – 5 receptions, 52 yards, TD
- MIN – Randy Moss – 6 receptions, 87 yards, TD

==== Week 10: at San Diego Chargers ====
Week 10: Minnesota Vikings at San Diego Chargers – Game summary

Quarter	1	2	3	4	Total
Vikings	7	7	0	14	28
Chargers	14	14	7	7	42

at Qualcomm Stadium, San Diego, California

- Date: November 9
- Game time: 3:05 p.m. CDT/1:05 p.m. PST
- Game weather: Partly cloudy, 66 °F (19 °C)
- Game attendance: 64,738
- Referee: Ed Hochuli (85)
- Recap, Game Book

Game information

First quarter

- SD – David Boston 3-yard pass from Doug Flutie (Steve Christie kick), 11:47. Chargers 7–0. Drive: 7 plays, 63 yards, 3:13.
- SD – LaDainian Tomlinson 73-yard run (Steve Christie kick), 7:51. Chargers 14–0. Drive: 5 plays, 85 yards, 1:59.
- MIN – Randy Moss 4-yard pass from Daunte Culpepper (Aaron Elling kick), 2:09. Chargers 14–7. Drive: 10 plays, 80 yards, 5:42.

Second quarter

- SD – Doug Flutie 3-yard run (Steve Christie kick), 11:36. Chargers 21–7. Drive: 12 plays, 68 yards, 5:33.
- MIN – Nate Burleson 19-yard pass from Daunte Culpepper (Aaron Elling kick), 4:42. Chargers 21–14. Drive: 11 plays, 83 yards, 6:54.
- SD – Antonio Gates 4-yard pass from Doug Flutie (Steve Christie kick), 0:25. Chargers 28–14. Drive: 10 plays, 66 yards, 4:17.

Third quarter

- SD – LaDainian Tomlinson 1-yard run (Steve Christie kick), 1:36. Chargers 35–14. Drive: 6 plays, 57 yards, 3:09.

Fourth quarter

- MIN – Moe Williams 31-yard pass from Daunte Culpepper (Aaron Elling kick), 14:48. Chargers 35–21. Drive: 4 plays, 52 yards, 1:48.
- SD – Doug Flutie 13-yard run (Steve Christie kick), 8:11. Chargers 42–21. Drive: 5 plays, 73 yards, 2:56.
- MIN – Moe Williams 2-yard pass from Daunte Culpepper (Aaron Elling kick), 4:20. Chargers 42–28. Drive: 10 plays, 57 yards, 3:51.

Top passers

- MIN – Daunte Culpepper – 32/44, 370 yards, 4 TD, INT
- SD – Doug Flutie – 21/29, 248 yards, 2 TD

Top rushers

- MIN – Moe Williams – 12 rushes, 45 yards
- SD – LaDainian Tomlinson – 16 rushes, 162 yards, 2 TD

Top receivers

- MIN – Moe Williams – 11 receptions, 126 yards, 2 TD
- SD – David Boston – 7 receptions, 82 yards, TD

==== Week 11: at Oakland Raiders ====
Week 11: Minnesota Vikings at Oakland Raiders – Game summary

Quarter	1	2	3	4	Total
Vikings	0	3	7	8	18
Raiders	7	7	7	7	28

at Network Associates Coliseum, Oakland, California

- Date: November 16
- Game time: 3:15 p.m. CDT/1:15 p.m. PST
- Game weather: Mostly cloudy, 55 °F (13 °C)
- Game attendance: 56,653
- Referee: Bill Leavy (127)
- Recap, Game Book

Game information

First quarter

- OAK – Phillip Buchanon 64-yard interception return (Sebastian Janikowski kick), 14:11. Raiders 7–0.

Second quarter

- MIN – Aaron Elling 35-yard field goal, 11:24. Raiders 7–3. Drive: 9 plays, 54 yards, 3:43.
- OAK – Zack Crockett 1-yard run (Sebastian Janikowski kick), 8:22. Raiders 14–3. Drive: 1 play, 1 yard, 0:07.

Third quarter

- OAK – Tyrone Wheatley 2-yard run (Sebastian Janikowski kick), 11:23. Raiders 21–3. Drive: 7 plays, 74 yards, 3:37.
- MIN – Daunte Culpepper 11-yard run (Aaron Elling kick), 2:12. Raiders 21–10. Drive: 4 plays, 70 yards, 1:52.

Fourth quarter

- MIN – Kelly Campbell 29-yard pass from Daunte Culpepper (Daunte Culpepper–Hunter Goodwin pass), 8:32. Raiders 21–18. Drive: 2 plays, 81 yards, 0:44.
- OAK – Zack Crockett 2-yard run (Sebastian Janikowski kick), 2:16. Raiders 28–18. Drive: 4 plays, 11 yards, 0:30.

Top passers

- MIN – Daunte Culpepper – 27/49, 396 yards, TD, 3 INT
- OAK – Rick Mirer – 9/13, 195 yards

Top rushers

- MIN – Daunte Culpepper – 7 rushes, 42 yards, TD
- OAK – Tyrone Wheatley – 32 rushes, 109 yards, TD

Top receivers

- MIN – Kelly Campbell – 4 receptions, 115 yards, TD
- OAK – O. J. Santiago – 2 receptions, 53 yards

==== Week 12: vs. Detroit Lions ====
Week 12: Detroit Lions at Minnesota Vikings – Game summary

Quarter	1	2	3	4	Total
Lions	0	0	7	7	14
Vikings	7	0	0	17	24

at Hubert H. Humphrey Metrodome, Minneapolis, Minnesota

- Date: November 23
- Game time: 12:00 p.m. CST
- Game weather: None (indoor stadium)
- Game attendance: 63,946
- Referee: Pete Morelli (135)
- Recap, Game Book

Game information

First quarter

- MIN – Michael Bennett 25-yard run (Aaron Elling kick), 7:29. Vikings 7–0. Drive: 7 plays, 62 yards, 3:41.

Second quarter

- No scoring plays.

Third quarter

- DET – Corey Harris 35-yard fumble return (Jason Hanson kick), 12:11. Tied 7–7.

Fourth quarter

- MIN – Aaron Elling 24-yard field goal, 2:45. Vikings 10–7. Drive: 15 plays, 73 yards, 8:49.
- MIN – Corey Chavous 32-yard interception return (Aaron Elling kick), 2:26. Vikings 17–7.
- MIN – Brian Williams 42-yard interception return (Aaron Elling kick), 2:06. Vikings 24–7.
- DET – Az-Zahir Hakim 5-yard pass from Joey Harrington (Jason Hanson kick), 0:35. Vikings 24–14. Drive: 8 plays, 57 yards, 1:31.

Top passers

- DET – Joey Harrington – 21/41, 167 yards, TD, 4 INT
- MIN – Daunte Culpepper – 20/30, 196 yards, INT

Top rushers

- DET – Joey Harrington – 2 rushes, 34 yards
- MIN – Michael Bennett – 15 rushes, 73 yards, TD

Top receivers

- DET – Az-Zahir Hakim – 7 receptions, 61 yards, TD
- MIN – Randy Moss – 5 receptions, 56 yards

==== Week 13: at St. Louis Rams ====
Week 13: Minnesota Vikings at St. Louis Rams – Game summary

Quarter	1	2	3	4	Total
Vikings	7	10	0	0	17
Rams	10	10	14	14	48

at Edward Jones Dome, St. Louis, Missouri

- Date: November 30
- Game time: 12:00 p.m. CST
- Game weather: None (indoor stadium)
- Game attendance: 66,134
- Referee: Terry McAulay (77)
- Recap, Game Book

Game information

First quarter

- STL – Marshall Faulk 18-yard run (Jeff Wilkins kick), 13:21. Rams 7–0. Drive: 1 play, 18 yards, 0:07.
- STL – Jeff Wilkins 28-yard field goal, 5:40. Rams 10–0. Drive: 12 plays, 62 yards, 4:38.
- MIN – Randy Moss 15-yard pass from Daunte Culpepper (Aaron Elling kick), 0:56. Rams 10–7. Drive: 8 plays, 76 yards, 4:44.

Second quarter

- STL – Isaac Bruce 4-yard pass from Marc Bulger (Jeff Wilkins kick), 11:50. Rams 17–7. Drive: 8 plays, 83 yards, 4:06.
- MIN – Aaron Elling 28-yard field goal, 5:43. Rams 17–10. Drive: 12 plays, 84 yards, 6:07.
- MIN – Moe Williams 1-yard run (Aaron Elling kick), 0:51. Tied 17–17. Drive: 7 plays, 41 yards, 3:19.
- STL – Jeff Wilkins 51-yard field goal, 0:00. Rams 20–17. Drive: 4 plays, 48 yards, 0:51.

Third quarter

- STL – Marshall Faulk 5-yard run (Jeff Wilkins kick), 4:50. Rams 27–17. Drive: 5 plays, 75 yards, 2:33.
- STL – Marc Bulger 12-yard run (Jeff Wilkins kick), 2:39. Rams 34–17. Drive: 1 play, 12 yards, 0:08.

Fourth quarter

- STL – Aeneas Williams 90-yard fumble return (Jeff Wilkins kick), 12:06. Rams 41–17.
- STL – Marshall Faulk 7-yard run (Jeff Wilkins kick), 6:48. Rams 48–17. Drive: 5 plays, 50 yards, 2:59.

Top passers

- MIN – Daunte Culpepper – 33/47, 330 yards, TD, INT
- STL – Marc Bulger – 15/20, 222 yards, TD, INT

Top rushers

- MIN – Michael Bennett – 14 rushes, 98 yards
- STL – Marshall Faulk – 17 rushes, 108 yards, 3 TD

Top receivers

- MIN – Randy Moss – 10 receptions, 160 yards, TD
- STL – Torry Holt – 8 receptions, 102 yards

==== Week 14: vs. Seattle Seahawks ====
Week 14: Seattle Seahawks at Minnesota Vikings – Game summary

Quarter	1	2	3	4	Total
Seahawks	0	0	7	0	7
Vikings	0	13	7	14	34

at Hubert H. Humphrey Metrodome, Minneapolis, Minnesota

- Date: December 7
- Game time: 12:00 p.m. CST
- Game weather: None (indoor stadium)
- Game attendance: 63,968
- Referee: Larry Nemmers (20)
- Recap, Game Book

Game information

First quarter

- No scoring plays.

Second quarter

- MIN – Randy Moss 47-yard pass from Daunte Culpepper (Aaron Elling kick), 13:17. Vikings 7–0. Drive: 3 plays, 58 yards, 1:13.
- MIN – Aaron Elling 36-yard field goal, 3:27. Vikings 10–0. Drive: 15 plays, 58 yards, 8:33.
- MIN – Aaron Elling 35-yard field goal, 0:00. Vikings 13–0. Drive: 11 plays, 43 yards, 2:22.

Third quarter

- SEA – Shaun Alexander 1-yard run (Josh Brown kick), 12:42. Vikings 13–7. Drive: 6 plays, 39 yards, 2:18.
- MIN – Randy Moss 45-yard pass from Daunte Culpepper (Aaron Elling kick), 9:24. Vikings 20–7. Drive: 7 plays, 72 yards, 3:18.

Fourth quarter

- MIN – Kelly Campbell 43-yard pass from Daunte Culpepper (Aaron Elling kick), 14:53. Vikings 27–7. Drive: 5 plays, 48 yards, 2:18.
- MIN – Mike Nattiel 80-yard interception return (Aaron Elling kick), 1:34. Vikings 34–7.

Top passers

- SEA – Matt Hasselbeck – 17/34, 218 yards, 2 INT
- MIN – Daunte Culpepper – 21/33, 274 yards, 3 TD

Top rushers

- SEA – Shaun Alexander – 14 rushes, 56 yards, TD
- MIN – Michael Bennett – 25 rushes, 103 yards

Top receivers

- SEA – Bobby Engram – 4 receptions, 93 yards
- MIN – Randy Moss – 8 receptions, 133 yards, 2 TD

==== Week 15: at Chicago Bears ====
Week 15: Minnesota Vikings at Chicago Bears – Game summary

Quarter	1	2	3	4	Total
Vikings	0	3	0	7	10
Bears	3	7	3	0	13

at Soldier Field, Chicago, Illinois

- Date: December 14
- Game time: 12:00 p.m. CST
- Game weather: Cloudy, 33 °F (1 °C)
- Game attendance: 61,804
- Referee: Jeff Triplette (42)
- Recap, Game Book

Game information

First quarter

- CHI – Paul Edinger 38-yard field goal, 13:10. Bears 3–0. Drive: 6 plays, 48 yards, 1:50.

Second quarter

- CHI – Anthony Thomas 1-yard run (Paul Edinger kick), 10:53. Bears 10–0. Drive: 10 plays, 75 yards, 4:49.
- MIN – Aaron Elling 22-yard field goal, 1:10. Bears 10–3. Drive: 19 plays, 73 yards, 9:43.

Third quarter

- CHI – Paul Edinger 22-yard field goal, 4:09. Bears 13–3. Drive: 7 plays, 15 yards, 3:29.

Fourth quarter

- MIN – Randy Moss 16-yard pass from Daunte Culpepper (Aaron Elling kick), 10:23. Bears 13–10. Drive: 7 plays, 64 yards, 3:04.

Top passers

- MIN – Daunte Culpepper – 24/34, 222 yards, TD, INT
- CHI – Rex Grossman – 13/30, 157 yards

Top rushers

- MIN – Onterrio Smith – 27 rushes, 148 yards
- CHI – Anthony Thomas – 19 rushes, 79 yards, TD

Top receivers

- MIN – Randy Moss – 9 receptions, 93 yards, TD
- CHI – Marty Booker – 3 receptions, 48 yards

==== Week 16: vs. Kansas City Chiefs ====
Week 16: Kansas City Chiefs at Minnesota Vikings – Game summary

Quarter	1	2	3	4	Total
Chiefs	0	0	7	13	20
Vikings	7	17	7	14	45

at Hubert H. Humphrey Metrodome, Minneapolis, Minnesota

- Date: December 20
- Game time: 4:15 p.m. CST
- Game weather: None (indoor stadium)
- Game attendance: 64,291
- Referee: Ron Blum (7)
- Recap, Game Book

Game information

First quarter

- MIN – Randy Moss 30-yard pass from Daunte Culpepper (Aaron Elling kick), 10:23. Vikings 7–0. Drive: 8 plays, 92 yards, 4:37.

Second quarter

- MIN – Randy Moss 21-yard pass from Daunte Culpepper (Aaron Elling kick), 10:58. Vikings 14–0. Drive: 7 plays, 63 yards, 3:27.
- MIN – Jim Kleinsasser 4-yard pass from Daunte Culpepper (Aaron Elling kick), 3:42. Vikings 21–0. Drive: 10 plays, 82 yards, 5:44.
- MIN – Aaron Elling 46-yard field goal, 0:00. Vikings 24–0. Drive: 8 plays, 41 yards, 2:53.

Third quarter

- MIN – Onterrio Smith 1-yard run (Aaron Elling kick), 11:44. Vikings 31–0. Drive: 6 plays, 60 yards, 2:07.
- KC – Priest Holmes 2-yard run (Morten Andersen kick), 5:16. Vikings 31–7. Drive: 14 plays, 75 yards, 6:28.

Fourth quarter

- KC – Priest Holmes 4-yard run (pass failed), 13:33. Vikings 31–13. Drive: 8 plays, 79 yards, 2:43.
- KC – Priest Holmes 1-yard run (Morten Andersen kick), 10:05. Vikings 31–20. Drive: 3 plays, 9 yards, 1:07.
- MIN – Onterrio Smith 11-yard run (Aaron Elling kick), 7:00. Vikings 38–20. Drive: 5 plays, 45 yards, 3:05.
- MIN – Onterrio Smith 10-yard run (Aaron Elling kick), 6:00. Vikings 45–20. Drive: 3 plays, 17 yards, 0:46.

Top passers

- KC – Trent Green – 18/38, 224 yards, 2 INT
- MIN – Daunte Culpepper – 20/29, 260 yards, 3 TD, INT

Top rushers

- KC – Priest Holmes – 18 rushes, 55 yards, 3 TD
- MIN – Onterrio Smith – 21 rushes, 146 yards, 3 TD

Top receivers

- KC – Eddie Kennison – 5 receptions, 89 yards
- MIN – Randy Moss – 7 receptions, 111 yards, 2 TD

==== Week 17: at Arizona Cardinals ====
Week 17: Minnesota Vikings at Arizona Cardinals – Game summary

Quarter	1	2	3	4	Total
Vikings	0	0	7	10	17
Cardinals	3	3	0	12	18

at Sun Devil Stadium, Tempe, Arizona

- Date: December 28
- Game time: 2:05 p.m. CST
- Game weather: Clear, 51 °F (11 °C)
- Game attendance: 52,734
- Referee: Tony Corrente (99)
- Recap, Game Book

Game information

First quarter

- ARI – Neil Rackers 22-yard field goal, 0:51. Cardinals 3–0. Drive: 14 plays, 94 yards, 8:00.

Second quarter

- ARI – Neil Rackers 26-yard field goal, 0:19. Cardinals 6–0. Drive: 4 plays, 5 yards, 0:23.

Third quarter

- MIN – Moe Williams 1-yard run (Aaron Elling kick), 7:08. Vikings 7–6. Drive: 8 plays, 67 yards, 4:39.

Fourth quarter

- MIN – Randy Moss 7-yard pass from Daunte Culpepper (Aaron Elling kick), 8:54. Vikings 14–6. Drive: 11 plays, 57 yards, 5:56.
- MIN – Aaron Elling 46-yard field goal, 6:48. Vikings 17–6. Drive: 4 plays, 1 yard, 1:53.
- ARI – Steve Bush 2-yard pass from Josh McCown (pass failed), 1:54. Vikings 17–12. Drive: 14 plays, 60 yards, 4:54.
- ARI – Nate Poole 28-yard pass from Josh McCown (run failed), 0:00. Cardinals 18–17. Drive: 6 plays, 61 yards, 1:54.

Top passers

- MIN – Daunte Culpepper – 18/28, 197 yards, TD, INT
- ARI – Josh McCown – 20/33, 224 yards, 2 TD, INT

Top rushers

- MIN – Michael Bennett – 12 rushes, 63 yards
- ARI – Josh McCown – 3 rushes, 27 yards

Top receivers

- MIN – Randy Moss – 5 receptions, 56 yards, TD
- ARI – Nate Poole – 5 receptions, 86 yards, TD

Despite still having a chance to make the playoffs by winning the NFC North, the Vikings squandered a 17–6 fourth-quarter lead in the final two minutes and lost to the 3–12 Arizona Cardinals after Josh McCown threw a 28-yard pass to Nate Poole for the game-winning touchdown with no time left, and with the Packers' win over the Broncos, they earned the NFC North title, ending the Vikings season.

=== Standings ===
NFC North
	W	L	T	PCT	DIV	CONF	PF	PA	STK
^{(4)} Green Bay Packers	10	6	0	.625	4–2	7–5	442	307	W4
Minnesota Vikings	9	7	0	.563	4–2	7–5	416	353	L1
Chicago Bears	7	9	0	.438	2–4	4–8	283	346	L1
Detroit Lions	5	11	0	.313	2–4	4–8	270	379	W1

== Statistics ==
=== Team leaders ===
Category	Player(s)	Value
Passing yards	Daunte Culpepper	3,479
Passing touchdowns	Daunte Culpepper	25
Rushing yards	Moe Williams	745
Rushing touchdowns	Moe Williams; Onterrio Smith	5
Receiving yards	Randy Moss	1,632 *
Receiving touchdowns	Randy Moss	17
Points	Randy Moss; Aaron Elling	102
Kickoff return yards	Onterrio Smith	588
Punt return yards	Keenan Howry	247
Tackles	Brian Russell	95
Sacks	Kevin Williams	10.5
Interceptions	Brian Russell	9
Forced fumbles	Kenny Mixon	4

* Vikings single season record

=== League rankings ===
Category	Total yards	Yards per game	NFL rank (out of 32)
Passing offense	3,951	246.9	4th
Rushing offense	2,343	146.4	4th
Total offense	6,294	393.4	1st
Passing defense	3,477	217.3	26th
Rushing defense	1,879	117.4	17th
Total defense	5,356	334.8	23rd
