= Go Number 1 =

The Go Number 1 was a product intended to fraudulently defeat drug tests. It was sold in the US like many other passing urine tests products like Bob's Little Helper or The Urinator. The Go Number 1 comes as a belt prefilled with clean urine and heater pads (to keep the urine at body temperature). It is similar to other products like Bobs Little Helper and The Urinator. It was designed for females but males used it, too. It was manufactured by Puck Technology of Signal Hill, California; a suburb of Los Angeles.

The United States Congress held hearings on the Go Number 1 Belt and the Whizzinator on May 17, 2005.

The company's websites, whizzinator.net and gonumber1.com, are no longer active as of November 2008.
