= Urinator =

Urinator can refer to:

- A former scientific name for the loon, a bird (British English: diver)
- Someone who urinates
- Underwater diver (an obsolete word)
- Gyrinus urinator, a species of whirligig beetle
- Bracon urinator, a species of parasitoid wasp

== See also ==
- Whizzinator
