= The Urinator =

Urine substitution device

The Urinator is a urine delivery device invented by Innovative Research Technology, Inc. and was available for sale on the internet in 1998. The first official Archive.org record was in March 2, 2001. The official website for The Urinator is located at Urinator.com.

== History ==
Since its launch in 1998, The Urinator has been featured in various media outlets. It was mentioned in the UK-based publication The Guardian in an article titled Enter The Urinator. The device has been advertised in High Times magazine.

== Features ==
The Urinator's main feature is its ability to maintain the urine sample at a specific, consistent temperature using an electronically controlled heating element. It is an electronic device that maintains the correct urine testing temperature for a minimum of four hours.

== Media Coverage ==
In addition to being featured in The Guardian and High Times, The Urinator has appeared in various other media outlets over the years.

== See also ==
- The Original Whizzinator
- Go Number 1
- Genetic discrimination
