= Steve Rhem =

American football player (born 1971)

No. 84
- Position: Wide receiver

Personal information
- Born: November 9, 1971 (age 54); Ocala, Florida, U.S.
- Listed height: 6 ft 2 in (1.88 m)
- Listed weight: 212 lb (96 kg)

Career information
- High school: Vanguard (Ocala)
- College: Minnesota (1989)
- NFL draft: 1994: undrafted

Career history
- Saskatchewan Roughriders (1993)*; New Orleans Saints (1994–1996); Philadelphia Eagles (1997)*
- * Offseason or practice squad member only
- Stats at Pro Football Reference

Steve Lamar Rhem (born November 9, 1971) is an American former professional football wide receiver who played for the New Orleans Saints of the National Football League (NFL). He played college football for the Minnesota Golden Gophers.

== Early life ==
Steve Lamar Rhem was born on November 9, 1971, in Ocala, Florida. He attended Vanguard High School in Ocala.

== College career ==
Smith enrolled at the University of Minnesota to play college football for the Golden Gophers. He played in all 11 games in 1989, totaling 12 receptions for 253 yards and one touchdown, 16 rushing attempts for 122 yards and one touchdown, and eight kick returns for 161 yards. He was named the Big Ten Conference rookie of the year by the conference's coaches. After his freshman year, Rhem was falsely accused of rape by a female student on campus. He was suspended by the team and left the school soon thereafter. In 1990, he transferred to Northeast Louisiana University to play for the Indians. He had to sit out the 1990 season due to NCAA transfer rules. In spring 1991, he was incorrectly diagnosed with epilepsy. After taking medication for four months, a follow-up physical determined that Rhem was healthy. However, it was too late in the year for him to play the 1991 season so he transferred to the University of Arkansas at Monticello, an NAIA school. Rhem said he felt out of place at Arkansas-Monticello and left the school without withdrawing from class, which gave him failing grades for the semester. In 1992, he transferred to Rowan College of New Jersey, an NCAA Division III school. He was ruled academically ineligible due to low grades.

== Professional career ==
In late September 1993, Rhem was signed to the practice roster of the Saskatchewan Roughriders of the Canadian Football League. On October 20, 1993, it was reported that he had been released.

On January 29, 1994, Rhem played in the Magnolia Bowl college football all-star game in Jackson, Mississippi, and had a strong performance (including two touchdown receptions). He was considered a prospect for the 1994 NFL draft. He reportedly ran a sub-4.5 second 40-yard dash. After going undrafted, Rhem signed with the New Orleans Saints on April 28, 1994. He played in seven games for the Saints during the 1994 season, mostly on special teams, and did not record any statistics. He was placed on injured reserve on November 9, 1994. Rhem appeared in eight games (no starts) in 1995, catching four passes for 50 yards on five targets. He was placed on injured reserve on August 5, 1996, missing the entire 1996 season.

Rhem became a free agent after the 1996 season, and signed with the Philadelphia Eagles on March 20, 1997. He was released on July 19, 1997.

== Personal life ==
Rhem's younger brother, Kenny Clark, also played in the NFL. Steve was later the head football coach at West Port High School in Ocala. He accumulated a combined 8–20 record before resigning on November 19, 2021, for personal reasons.
