= Corey Chavous =

American football player (born 1976)

No. 21, 25
- Positions: Safety, cornerback

Personal information
- Born: January 5, 1976 (age 50); Aiken, South Carolina, U.S.
- Listed height: 6 ft 1 in (1.85 m)
- Listed weight: 208 lb (94 kg)

Career information
- High school: Silver Bluff (Aiken)
- College: Vanderbilt
- NFL draft: 1998: 2nd round, 33rd overall pick

Career history
- Arizona Cardinals (1998–2001); Minnesota Vikings (2002–2005); St. Louis Rams (2006–2008)

Awards and highlights
- Pro Bowl (2003); Carl Ekern Spirit of the Game Award (2006–2008); First-team All-SEC (1997)

Career NFL statistics
- Tackles: 733
- Sacks: 5.5
- Forced fumbles: 3
- Fumble recoveries: 3
- Interceptions: 20
- Defensive touchdowns: 2
- Stats at Pro Football Reference

Corey Lamonte Chavous (/ˈtʃeɪvəs/; born January 5, 1976) is an American former professional football safety and cornerback who played in the National Football League (NFL) for 11 seasons. He was a Pro Bowl selection in 2003. He is the founder of the media company and website DraftNastyMagazine.com, which specializes in coverage of the major sports with an emphasis on scouting and professional drafts. He is currently a color analyst for college football games as well as an NFL draft analyst for CBS Sports.

== Early life ==
Chavous attended Silver Bluff High School in Aiken, South Carolina. In football, he was an All-Area, and an All-District pick, and in track, he was an All-State choice and was part of a 4 × 100 relay team which won the state title. He was a high school teammate of former Chicago Bears and Vikings wide receiver D'Wayne Bates.

== College career ==
Chavous attended Vanderbilt University. He finished his career with 12 interceptions (which ranks sixth on the school's all-time list), made 199 tackles, and batted down 31 passes. He graduated with a degree in human and organizational development.

== Professional career ==
=== Arizona Cardinals ===
Chavous was selected by the Arizona Cardinals in the second round (33rd overall) in the 1998 NFL draft. In his rookie season he played in 16 games, starting five, recording 28 tackles and two interceptions, his first coming at the Kansas City Chiefs on November 30. During the team's 1999 NFC Wildcard playoff 20–7 victory over the Dallas Cowboys, Chavous notched five tackles and six passes defensed. In 1999, he played in 15 games recording 40 tackles and one interception. The following year, he made 48 tackles and one interception. In his final year with the Cardinals, Chavous made 74 tackles and one interception.

=== Minnesota Vikings ===
On March 25, 2002, Chavous signed a four-year contract with the Minnesota Vikings as an unrestricted free agent. In his debut season he started in all 16 games recording 83 tackles, three interceptions and one touchdown, the first of his career at the Detroit Lions on December 29. In 2003, he made 86 tackles, a career-high eight interceptions and one touchdown. His performances that season earned him a trip to the 2004 Pro Bowl. The following year, he made 81 tackles and one interception. In his final season with the Vikings, Chavous started all 16 games for a fourth straight season, recording 71 tackles and two interceptions.

=== St. Louis Rams ===
On March 13, 2006, Chavous signed a three-year contract with the St. Louis Rams as an unrestricted free agent. During the subsequent 2006 NFL draft, he was an analyst alongside Mike Mayock and Rich Eisen for their draft coverage. In his first season, he equaled his career-high of 86 tackles and made one interception. In 2008, he started 14 games making 75 tackles and 3.5 sacks.

On February 13, 2009, Chavous was released by the Rams.

=== NFL statistics ===
Year	Team	GP	Tackles				Fumbles		Interceptions					
Year	Team	GP	Comb	Solo	Ast	Sack	FF	FR	Int	Yds	Avg	Lng	TD	PD
1998	ARI	16	26	20	6	0.0	0	0	2	0	0.0	0	0	8
1999	ARI	15	37	27	10	0.0	1	0	1	1	1.0	1	0	5
2000	ARI	16	45	39	6	0.0	0	0	1	0	0.0	0	0	3
2001	ARI	14	73	61	12	0.0	0	0	1	0	0.0	0	0	8
2002	MIN	16	83	66	17	1.0	0	0	3	76	25.3	43	1	5
2003	MIN	16	86	75	11	0.0	0	0	8	143	17.9	39	1	14
2004	MIN	16	80	59	21	0.0	1	0	1	0	0.0	0	0	6
2005	MIN	16	71	54	17	0.0	0	1	2	0	0.0	0	0	5
2006	STL	16	86	77	9	1.0	0	2	1	17	17.0	17	0	8
2007	STL	14	75	63	12	3.5	1	0	0	0	0.0	0	0	3
2008	STL	16	63	52	11	0.0	0	1	0	0	0.0	0	0	1
Career		171	725	593	132	5.5	3	4	20	237	11.9	43	2	66

== Post-playing career ==
Chavous has been featured on various sports programs as an analyst of college football talent, especially in regards to their potential for the National Football League draft and is currently a color analyst and draft analyst for CBS Sports. Chavous was one of the lead analysts on the NFL Network's coverage of the draft at Radio City Music Hall in 2006. Along with host Rich Eisen and NFL Network draft guru Mike Mayock, the trio covered all of the NFL Network's two-day weekend.

Chavous' website, DraftNastymagazine.com, covers the NFL Draft on a year-round basis. Chavous and his scouts tour college campuses to find NFL Draft prospects and related issues to spotlight.

== Personal life ==
Chavous is the nephew of former Denver Broncos defensive end Barney Chavous. He is also the cousin of Fred Vinson, former NFL and Vanderbilt University football player.
