= Onterrio Smith =

American gridiron football player (born 1980)

No. 32
- Position: Running back

Personal information
- Born: December 8, 1980 (age 45); Sacramento, California, U.S.

Career information
- High school: Grant Union (Sacramento)
- College: Tennessee (1999); Oregon (2000–2002)
- NFL draft: 2003: 4th round, 105th overall pick

Career history
- Minnesota Vikings (2003–2005); Winnipeg Blue Bombers (2006)*
- * Offseason or practice squad member only

Awards and highlights
- PFWA All-Rookie Team (2003); Pro Football Weekly All-Rookie Team (2003); First-team All-Pac-10 (2002); Second-team All-Pac-10 (2001)

Career NFL statistics
- Rushing attempts: 231
- Rushing yards: 1,123
- Rushing touchdowns: 7
- Receptions: 51
- Receiving yards: 523
- Receiving touchdowns: 2
- Stats at Pro Football Reference

Onterrio Raymond Lloyd Smith (born December 8, 1980) is an American former professional football player who was a running back for the Minnesota Vikings of the National Football League (NFL). He played college football for the Oregon Ducks, after being kicked off the team by head coach Phillip Fulmer at Tennessee.

Smith spent 2006's training camp with the Winnipeg Blue Bombers of the Canadian Football League (CFL).

== Early life ==
Smith attended Grant Union High School where he was teammates with Wide receivers Donté Stallworth and Paris Warren and Arena Football League player Chad Elliott. Smith helped his team to the sectional championship as a sophomore, rushing for over 1,000 yards and scoring 16 touchdowns. He crushed the competition in his senior year leading the Pacers to a 10-1-1 record. Smith rushed for 3,125 yards and 53 touchdowns plus 7 more receiving touchdowns. On defense that same year he had 74 tackles.

Smith was SuperPrep All-American and a two-time All-State pick. He also established career marks with 6,178 yards rushing and 99 scores ... Posted a single-game rushing best of 373 yards against Yuba City, and scored 6 touchdowns in three different games ... Named the 1998 All-City Offensive Player of the Year and league MVP ... Also started two years at defensive back. Coming out of high school, he was the most recruited player in the country.

Smith also played on the Pacers basketball team though his skills on the hard-wood did not match his skills on turf. In March 1999 Smith and the Pacers played in the state championship game against a Dominguez High (Compton, California) team that featured future NBA center Tyson Chandler. Smith came off of the bench shooting 6-9 from the field, scoring 13 points, with 4 rebounds, & 2 assists in 18 minutes. Grant lost to Dominguez 72–59.

== College career ==
Smith originally attended the University of Tennessee, however, he was kicked off the team by head coach Phillip Fulmer and transferred to the University of Oregon. While at Tennessee, Smith was teammates with quarterback Tee Martin and fellow Running back Jamal Lewis.

In his two seasons at Oregon, Smith rushed 419 times for 2,199 yards and 19 touchdowns, which ranked seventh on the school's all-time rushing list at the time of his graduation. During his senior season at Oregon, he was an All-Pac-10 First-team selection, as well as team MVP.

== Professional career ==
=== Minnesota Vikings ===
Smith was selected in the fourth round (105th overall) of the 2003 NFL draft by the Minnesota Vikings. After the draft, he shaved the letters "S.O.D." ("Steal of the Draft") into his head. His career in Minnesota and the National Football League lasted just three seasons (two active, one on suspension).

As a rookie in 2003, Smith rushed the ball 107 times for 579 yards and five touchdowns. The next season, he ran the ball 144 times for 544 yards and two touchdowns, which led the Vikings who had injury problems at running back.

In May 2005, Smith was detained at the Minneapolis–Saint Paul International Airport for carrying dried urine and a "mysterious" device that was later identified as a Whizzinator (a sex simulator toy, often used alternatively to beat drug tests). In June, he was suspended for the entire 2005 season after a third violation of the NFL's substance abuse policy.

On Wednesday, April 26, 2006, Smith was released by the Vikings three days prior to the 2006 NFL draft and more than a month away from the end of his suspension.

=== Winnipeg Blue Bombers ===
Smith signed with the Winnipeg Blue Bombers of the Canadian Football League on May 12, 2006. He reported to training camp 20 pounds over his playing weight, and he suffered a foot injury on the first day of practice, which prevented him from participating until near the end of training camp. He was released on June 11, 2006.

On April 3, 2007, the Minnesota Star Tribune reported that Smith had applied for reinstatement to the NFL after a two-year suspension.

== Post-football ==
At 4:00 A.M. on May 2, 2008, Smith was pulled over at the intersection of Morrison Avenue and Disk Drive in Sacramento, California by police Sgt. Matt Young. Smith was then arrested on suspicion of DUI, and was booked on a misdemeanor DUI charge as well as a traffic warrant. His bail was set at $3,746.

Following his career, Smith withdrew from football, but later got back into it when his son, Onterrio Junior, showed an interest in it. Onterrio Junior debuted for the Sacramento State Hornets as a wide receiver in the fall of 2023.
