= Brian Russell =

American football player (born 1978)

No. 27, 25, 42, 26
- Position: Safety

Personal information
- Born: February 5, 1978 (age 48); West Covina, California, U.S.
- Listed height: 6 ft 2 in (1.88 m)
- Listed weight: 210 lb (95 kg)

Career information
- High school: Bishop Amat Memorial (La Puente, California)
- College: Penn (1996); San Diego State (1997–2000)
- NFL draft: 2001: undrafted

Career history
- Minnesota Vikings (2001–2004); Cleveland Browns (2005–2006); Seattle Seahawks (2007–2008); Jacksonville Jaguars (2009); Houston Texans (2009)

Awards and highlights
- NFL interceptions co-leader (2003); All-MWC (2000)

Career NFL statistics
- Total tackles: 479
- Sacks: 3
- Forced fumbles: 2
- Fumble recoveries: 3
- Interceptions: 16
- Stats at Pro Football Reference

Brian William Russell (born February 5, 1978) is an American former professional football player who was a safety for nine seasons in the National Football League (NFL) from 2001 to 2009. He was signed by the Minnesota Vikings as an undrafted free agent in 2001 and last played for the Houston Texans. He played college football for the Penn Quakers and San Diego State Aztecs.

Russell also played for the Cleveland Browns, Seattle Seahawks, and Jacksonville Jaguars.

== Early life ==
Russell played at Bishop Amat High School in La Puente, California. His team won the Del Rey League championship in 1993, 1994, and 1995. As a senior quarterback, he led the team to the 1995 CIF Division I title. He was named All-Del Rey League and was awarded MVP honors at the annual East-West All-Star Game.

== College career ==
Russell was recruited and spent his freshman season in 1996 at the University of Pennsylvania, where he became the first quarterback in the history of the school to start as a freshman. He played in 10 games (starting two); he finished the season with 27 completions in 43 attempts for 320 yards, with four touchdowns and four interceptions. However, Russell wanted to play at the Division I-A level. He was offered a scholarship at San Diego State University (SDSU) to play for coach Ted Tollner and the Aztecs.

Russell redshirted during the 1997 season. He took over as San Diego State's starting quarterback in the second game of the 1998 season (replacing injured starter Spencer Brinton). Russell quarterbacked the Aztecs the rest of the season and led them to the Las Vegas Bowl, the school's first bowl appearance in seven seasons. Notably, he totaled five rushing touchdowns in the season, the most by an SDSU quarterback since 1981.

Russell began the 1999 year as the team's starting QB but was asked to switch to safety, a better fit for his skill set, allowing JUCO transfer Jack Hawley to assume quarterback responsibilities. Because of his athleticism, Russell immediately became the starter at free safety where he played alongside safety Will Demps. In his first game as a defender, he made 10 tackles, including three straight solo stops. His senior season (2000) was solid, he made 68 tackles (41 solo), recovered two fumbles, and intercepted one pass. For his efforts, he was named All-Mountain West Conference.

== Professional career ==
=== Minnesota Vikings ===
After going undrafted in the 2001 NFL draft, Russell signed with the Minnesota Vikings as an undrafted free agent. He spent the entire 2001 season on the team's practice squad. Head coach Dennis Green considered cutting Russell, but defensive coordinator Willie Shaw convinced Green to give Russell a chance to play. Russell played mostly special teams in 2002, but did see enough action at strong safety to make his first career interception (against the Chicago Bears in his first career start).

In 2003, Russell became a full-time starter and recorded an interception in each of Minnesota's first six games, a Vikings record. He finished the regular season with nine interceptions, tied for the most in the NFL with Tony Parrish, and led the team in tackles with 95. His best game of the season was against the Kansas City Chiefs, where he tied a team record with three takeaways (two interceptions and the first fumble recovery of his career).

In 2004, Russell moved to free safety. He started all 16 games for the second consecutive season and recorded one interception in the regular season and another in the playoffs. Russell set a new career high with 111 tackles, and the Vikings beat the Green Bay Packers in the NFC playoffs, where Russell recorded his first playoff interception, before losing to the Philadelphia Eagles.

=== Cleveland Browns ===
Russell joined the Cleveland Browns as a restricted free agent in 2005. Russell was targeted by coach Romeo Crennel in free agency to solidify a young secondary. He became a defensive leader and the signal caller for a unit that finished 2nd in the NFL in passing yards allowed and 5th in points allowed. For the third straight season, he started all 16 regular season games. He finished with 70 tackles and three interceptions. His season was shortened due to injury the following year (2006); he totaled 51 tackles and one interception in 12 games before an elbow injury forced the Browns to place him on injured reserve.

=== Seattle Seahawks ===
In 2007, Russell signed with the Seattle Seahawks as an unrestricted free agent. Head coach Mike Holmgren said that he wanted Russell to be the "quarterback of the defense" for his team. Russell made 68 tackles and added an interception in 16 starts in 2007 as part of a secondary that allowed the fewest touchdown passes in franchise history. Russell again started 16 games in 2008, marking the 5th time in his career to start every contest. On September 5, 2009, the Seahawks released Russell.

=== Jacksonville Jaguars ===
Russell signed with the Jacksonville Jaguars on September 8, 2009. Russell and defensive coordinator Mel Tucker were reunited after spending two previous seasons together (2005–2006) as members of the Cleveland Browns. Russell was released on November 21.

=== Houston Texans ===
Russell was signed by the Houston Texans on November 25. He played his last NFL game on January 3, 2010, when he helped the Texans secure their first winning season by beating the New England Patriots at Reliant Stadium.

== NFL career statistics ==
Legend
	Led the league
**Bold**	Career high

=== Regular season ===
Year	Team	Games		Tackles					Interceptions					Fumbles			
Year	Team	GP	GS	Cmb	Solo	Ast	Sck	TFL	Int	Yds	TD	Lng	PD	FF	FR	Yds	TD
2002	MIN	**16**	2	24	19	5	0.0	0	1	18	0	18	2	0	0	0	0
2003	MIN	**16**	**16**	**95**	**78**	17	**1.0**	**2**	**9**	**185**	0	**50**	**11**	0	**1**	0	0
2004	MIN	**16**	**16**	82	62	20	0.0	1	1	41	0	41	7	0	**1**	0	0
2005	CLE	**16**	**16**	70	47	**23**	0.0	0	3	50	0	37	7	0	0	0	0
2006	CLE	12	12	52	43	9	0.0	0	1	6	0	6	4	**1**	0	0	0
2007	SEA	**16**	**16**	68	60	8	**1.0**	**2**	1	0	0	0	6	0	**1**	0	0
2008	SEA	**16**	**16**	72	55	17	**1.0**	**2**	0	0	0	0	3	**1**	0	0	0
2009	JAX	9	1	12	9	3	0.0	0	0	0	0	0	0	0	0	0	0
2009	HOU	3	0	4	2	2	0.0	0	0	0	0	0	0	0	0	0	0
		120	95	479	375	104	3.0	7	16	300	0	50	40	2	3	0	0

=== Playoffs ===
Year	Team	Games		Tackles					Interceptions					Fumbles			
Year	Team	GP	GS	Cmb	Solo	Ast	Sck	TFL	Int	Yds	TD	Lng	PD	FF	FR	Yds	TD
2004	MIN	**2**	**2**	4	3	1	0.0	0	**1**	**14**	0	**14**	1	0	0	0	0
2007	SEA	**2**	**2**	**12**	**9**	**3**	0.0	0	0	0	0	0	**2**	**1**	0	0	0
		4	4	16	12	4	0.0	0	1	14	0	14	3	1	0	0	0

== Personal life ==
Russell's wife, Leslie, is a former All-American track athlete who attended San Diego State and competed in the 2004 Summer Olympic trials. Russell attended the University of Washington Foster School of Business after retiring from the NFL to pursue a master's degree in business administration. Brian and Leslie Russell have four children.
