= Kenny Clark (wide receiver) =

American football player (1978–2025)

No. 89
- Position: Wide receiver

Personal information
- Born: May 14, 1978; Gainesville, Florida, U.S.
- Died: May 29, 2025 (aged 47)
- Listed height: 6 ft 1 in (1.85 m)
- Listed weight: 217 lb (98 kg)

Career information
- High school: Vanguard (Ocala, Florida)
- College: UCF
- NFL draft: 2001: undrafted

Career history
- Minnesota Vikings (2001–2004); → Amsterdam Admirals (2003)*
- * Offseason or practice squad member only

Career NFL statistics
- Kick return yards: 33
- Kick return average: 16.5
- Stats at Pro Football Reference

Kenneth L. Clark (May 14, 1978 – May 29, 2025) was an American professional football player who was a wide receiver for three seasons with the Minnesota Vikings of the National Football League (NFL). He played college football for the UCF Knights. Clark had limited game action with the Vikings due to injuries.

== Early life and college career ==
Born in Gainesville, Florida, Clark grew up in Ocala, Florida, and graduated from Vanguard High School in 1996. At Vanguard, Clark played football with his cousin, quarterback Daunte Culpepper, who would go on to play professional football. Clark's older brother Steve Rhem also played professional football.

At the University of Central Florida, Clark played at wide receiver for the UCF Knights from 1997 to 2000, graduating with the seventh most receptions (130) and tenth most receiving yards (1,655) in program history.

== Professional career ==
Pre-draft measurables
Height	Weight	40-yard dash	10-yard split	20-yard split	Vertical jump	Broad jump
6 ft 1 3/8 in (1.86 m)	225 lb (102 kg)	4.59 s	1.66 s	2.65 s	35.5 in (0.90 m)	10 ft 1 in (3.07 m)
All values from NFL Combine

After the 2001 NFL draft, Clark signed as an undrafted free agent with the Minnesota Vikings on April 23, 2001, again becoming a teammate of his cousin Culpepper. Clark was on the practice squad for most of the 2001 season and missed 2002 with a back injury.

In February 2003, Clark was allocated to the Amsterdam Admirals of NFL Europe, spending the season on the practice squad. Later that year, he would play the only game in his professional career, in which he returned two kickoffs for 33 yards in a 23–13 win over the Detroit Lions on September 21. Due to a back injury, Clark was released from the Vikings with an injury settlement on August 5, 2004. With his settlement, Clark reportedly receives a lifetime annual $250,000 paycheck from the NFL. Since retiring from football, Clark flipped houses in the Atlanta area and donated to Vanguard High School's football program.

== Personal life ==
Clark had two sons, Skyy and Zachiah, both college basketball players.

== Death ==
On May 29, 2025, Clark died after having longstanding medical issues.
