= Mike Nattiel =

American football player (born 1980)

Michael Nattiel
No. 59
- Position: Linebacker

Personal information
- Born: November 8, 1980 (age 45); Gainesville, Florida, U.S.
- Listed height: 6 ft 0 in (1.83 m)
- Listed weight: 227 lb (103 kg)

Career information
- High school: Newberry (Newberry, Florida)
- College: Florida
- NFL draft: 2003: 6th round, 190th overall pick

Career history
- Minnesota Vikings (2003–2004)

Career NFL statistics
- Games played: 32
- Tackles: 31
- Interceptions: 1
- Stats at Pro Football Reference

Michael Dondril Nattiel (born November 8, 1980) is an American former professional football player who was a linebacker for two seasons with the Minnesota Vikings of the National Football League (NFL) during the early 2000s. Nattiel played college football for the Florida Gators, and thereafter, he played in the NFL for the Vikings.

== Early life ==
Nattiel was born in Gainesville, Florida in 1980. He attended Newberry High School in Newberry, Florida, where he played for the Newberry Fighting Panthers high school football team. Nattiel was a three-time Florida Class 3A all-state honoree at linebacker, and was recognized as a high school All-American by SuperPrep, PrepStar and National Blue Chips.

== College career ==
Nattiel accepted an athletic scholarship to attend the University of Florida in Gainesville, and played outside linebacker for coach Steve Spurrier and coach Ron Zook's Gators teams from 1999 to 2002. Nattiel recovered a key fumble in the Gators' Southeastern Conference (SEC) championship victory over the Auburn Tigers in 2000, and was an honorable mention All-SEC selection in 2002.

== Professional career ==
The Minnesota Vikings selected Nattiel in the sixth round (190th pick overall) of the 2003 NFL draft, and he played for the Vikings from 2003 to 2004. In his two-season NFL career, Nattiel played in thirty-two games in a backup role, the highlight of which was an 80-yard interception return for a touchdown in 2003.

== Personal life ==
Nattiel is the nephew of Ricky Nattiel, former standout wide receiver for the Florida Gators and the NFL's Denver Broncos. After his professional career, he returned to the state of Florida to coach football, and returned to his home town Panthers in 2011 as defensive coordinator.

== See also ==
- History of the Minnesota Vikings
- List of Florida Gators in the NFL draft
