= Vanguard High School =

School in Ocala, Florida, United States

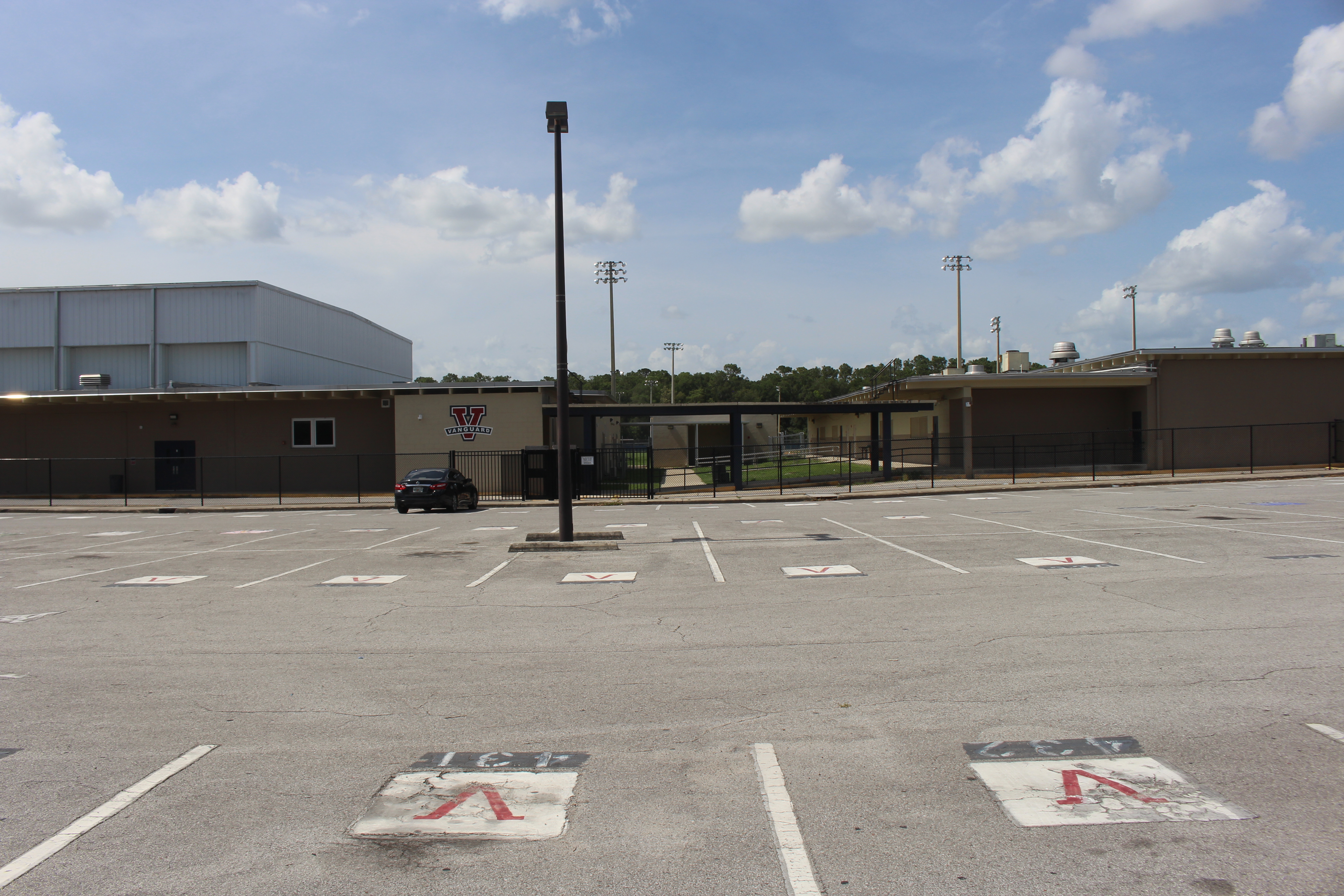

Location
- 7 Northwest 28th Street; Ocala, Florida 34475; United States; 29.2169202°N 82.143426°W

Information
- Type: Public
- Established: 1969
- School district: Marion County Public Schools
- Principal: Colleen Wade
- Teaching staff: 72.00 (FTE)
- Grades: 9–12
- Enrollment: 1,634 (2023–2024)
- Student to teacher ratio: 22.69
- Colors: Red, white, and blue
- Nickname: Knights
- Rival: Forest High School
- Website: Vanguard High School

Vanguard High School is one of seven public high schools in Marion County, Florida. The school serves the northeast area of Ocala, Florida. Vanguard offers the International Baccalaureate program, which accepts students from across Marion County and from surrounding counties and accounts for approximately 25% of the student population. In addition to the IB Program, Vanguard High School is the home of the Future Educators Academy. Graduates of the Future Educators Academy have the opportunity to dual enroll and complete their AA degree upon high school graduation.

Vanguard's mascot is a knight and the school colors are red, white, and blue. Notable alumni include NFL football player Daunte Culpepper and Dustin Moskovitz, co-founder of Facebook. The Vanguard Knight's cross-town rivals are the Forest High School Wildcats. Raney's Inc., Siva MD PA and AdventHealth are the school's business partners.

The student population as of the 2021-2022 school year is 1,600 students. The school is staffed by 120 people.

== IB Program ==
In 1996, Vanguard began involvement with the International Baccalaureate (IB) Diploma Programme. Vanguard is currently recognized as an IB World School. Vanguard was the 26th High School in the State of Florida, and is the only school in Marion County to offer this curriculum.

Students accepted into the program take advanced classes for their Freshman and Sophomore years, which prepare them for the actual IB courses taken in Junior and Senior years. Students can be accepted into the program as ninth or tenth graders, but eleventh and twelfth graders can only transfer in from another IB school. The first two years are termed as Pre-IB and consist of a combination of Advanced Placement, Pre-IB or Honors courses designed to prepare students for the actual IB courses and exams.

== Integration ==
Vanguard was the first integrated school in Marion County.

== Notable alumni ==
- Kenny Clark – Former professional football wide receiver for the Minnesota Vikings in the NFL
- Daunte Culpepper – Former professional football quarterback for the Minnesota Vikings, Miami Dolphins and Detroit Lions in the NFL
- Drayton Florence – Former professional football cornerback for the Buffalo Bills in the NFL
- Travis Mays – Former NBA basketball player
- Carlos Eduardo Mendoza - Federal Judge
- Dustin Moskovitz - Co-founder of the social networking site Facebook
- Michael James Shaw - Actor
- Natrell Jamerson - Former professional football player for the Green Bay Packers in the NFL
- Tyree Gillespie - Former professional football safety for the Las Vegas Raiders in the NFL
- DeWayne McBride - Current professional football running back for the Minnesota Vikings in the NFL
- N'Kosi Perry - Current professional football quarterback for the Raiders Tirol in the European Football League
- P. J. Williams – Former professional football cornerback for the New Orleans Saints in the NFL

== See also ==
- International Baccalaureate
- IB Diploma Programme
- National Merit Scholarship Program

== Notes ==
Notably the Vanguard High School class of 2005 still holds the record among all the county schools for the most eligible graduates in the history of the Marion County Public school systems records.
