= Aaron Elling =

American football player (born 1978)

No. 8
- Position: Placekicker

Personal information
- Born: May 31, 1978 (age 48); Waconia, Minnesota, U.S.
- Listed height: 6 ft 2 in (1.88 m)
- Listed weight: 200 lb (91 kg)

Career information
- High school: Lander Valley (WY)
- College: Wyoming
- NFL draft: 2001: undrafted

Career history
- Miami Dolphins (2001)*; Seattle Seahawks (2002)*; Minnesota Vikings (2003); Tennessee Titans (2004); Minnesota Vikings (2004); Baltimore Ravens (2005); Atlanta Falcons (2007)*; Jacksonville Jaguars (2007)*; Cincinnati Bengals (2007); Oakland Raiders (2008)*
- * Offseason or practice squad member only

Awards and highlights
- Second-team All-Mountain West (2001)
- Stats at Pro Football Reference

Aaron John Elling (born May 31, 1978) is an American former professional football placekicker. He was signed by the Minnesota Vikings as an undrafted free agent in 2002. He played college football at Wyoming.

== Early life ==
Born in Waconia, his family moved to Wyoming in his childhood. During his high school studies at Lander Valley High, he was a speaker at numerous events and was a player in the soccer team with whom he won two All-State honors.

== College career ==
Elling attended George Fox University where he played soccer his freshman year. He then transferred to the University of Wyoming where he walked on the football team. Majoring in exercise physiology at Wyoming, he planned to attend Pacific University to study optometry.

== Professional career ==
=== Minnesota Vikings ===
He signed for the Miami Dolphins as a college free agent on May 7, 2002, but was waived on August 27.

In 2003, Elling signed with the Vikings as a free agent and played in all 16 games scoring 102 points. He made his NFL debut against the Green Bay Packers on September 7. He was waived by the Vikings on September 2, 2004.

=== Tennessee Titans ===
Elling signed with the Tennessee Titans on September 10, 2004, and in the season opener he scored five points and played as both kicker and punter. He was then waived by the Titans.

=== Minnesota Vikings (second stint) ===
Elling re-signed as a free agent by the Vikings on September 17, 2004. He suffered a broken ankle against the Indianapolis Colts and was placed on season-ending injured reserve. He was waived by the Vikings on September 6, 2005. In his two stints with the Viking he had a 72 field goal percentage, hitting 18 of 25 attempts.

=== Baltimore Ravens ===
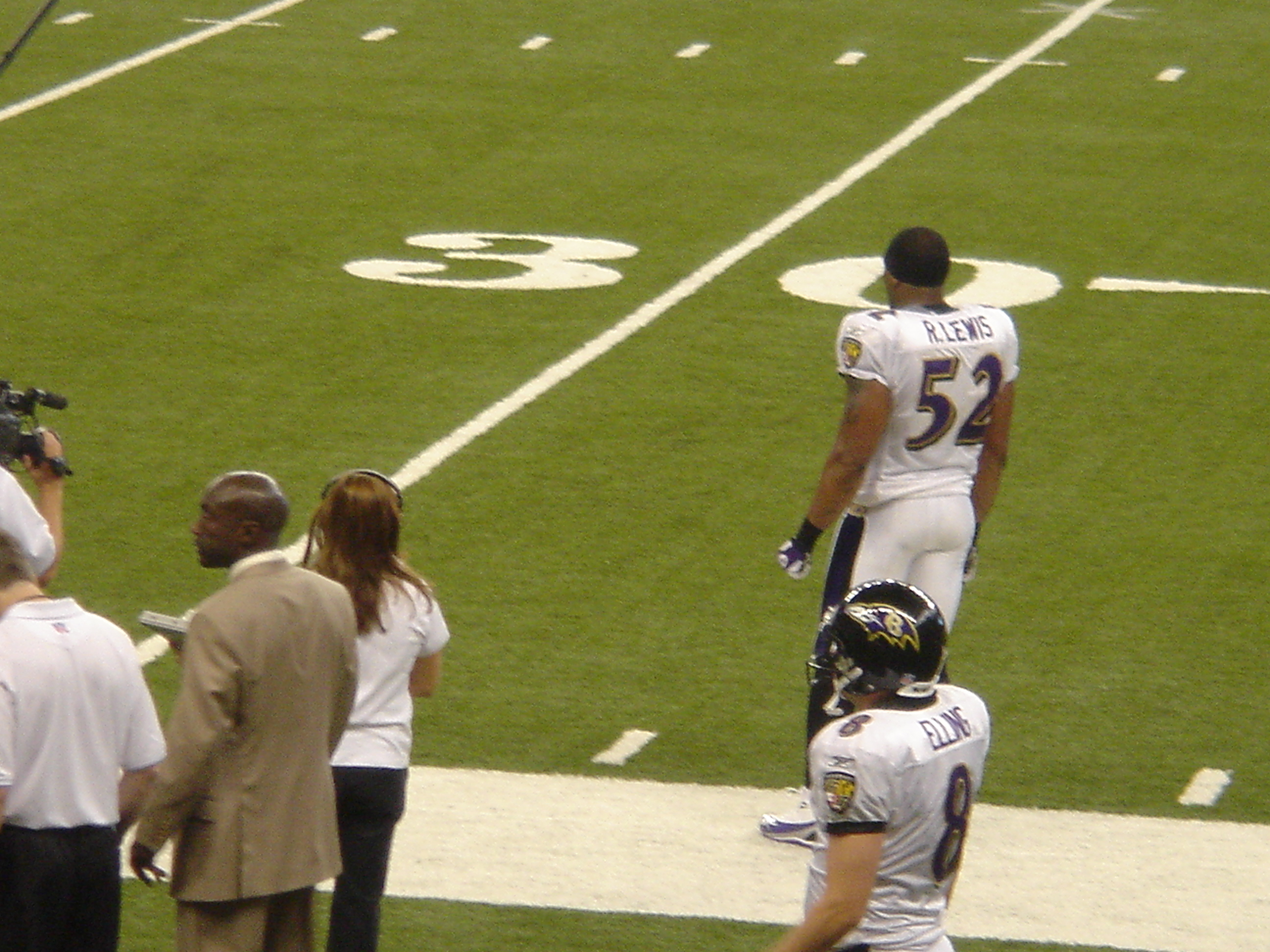
Elling (8) with the Ravens in 2005.

Elling signed with the Baltimore Ravens as a free agent on September 27, 2005, and played in nine games. He was waived by the team on September 1, 2006.

=== Atlanta Falcons ===
On March 22, 2007, Elling signed with the Atlanta Falcons. He was cut on August 6.

=== Jacksonville Jaguars ===
Elling was signed by the Jaguars on August 10, 2007, as a free agent but was then released.

=== Cincinnati Bengals ===
Elling was then signed by the Cincinnati Bengals during the 2007 preseason. However, in his preseason debut, he tore a ligament in his knee attempting to make a tackle on kickoff, and was released on September 2.

=== Oakland Raiders ===
On August 8, 2008, Elling was signed by the Oakland Raiders to fill in for Sebastian Janikowski in the preseason. Offensive tackle Mark Wilson was placed on injured reserve to make room for Elling. He was cut on August 26.
