= Ron Vander Kelen =

American football player (1939–2016)

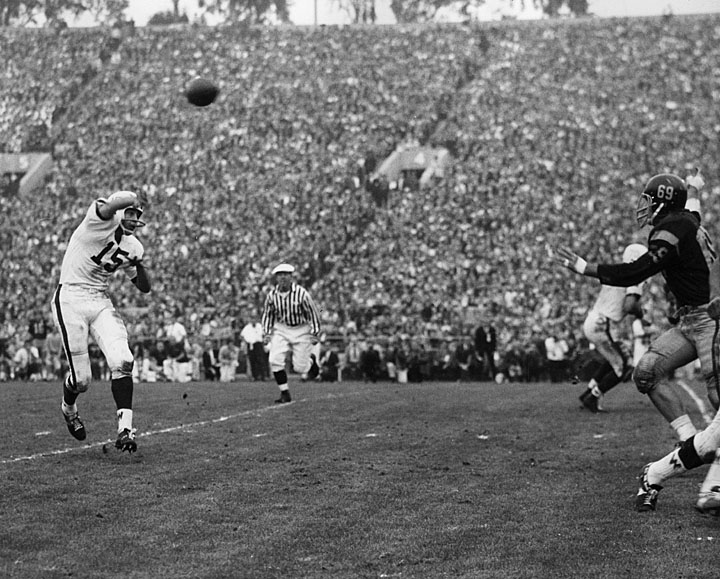
- Vander Kelen (#15, white) in the 1963 Rose Bowl

No. 11, 15, 19
- Position: Quarterback

Personal information
- Born: November 6, 1939; Preble, Wisconsin, U.S.
- Died: August 14, 2016 (aged 76); Edina, Minnesota, U.S.
- Listed height: 6 ft 1 in (1.85 m)
- Listed weight: 185 lb (84 kg)

Career information
- High school: Preble
- College: Wisconsin
- NFL draft: 1963: undrafted
- AFL draft: 1963: 21st round, 163rd overall pick

Career history
- Minnesota Vikings (1963–1967); Calgary Stampeders (1968)

Awards and highlights
- Chicago Tribune Silver Football (1962); First-team All-Big Ten (1962); 1963 Rose Bowl MVP; Chicago College All-Star Game MVP (1963); Rose Bowl Hall of Fame (1991)

Career NFL statistics
- Passing attempts: 252
- Passing completions: 107
- Completion percentage: 42.5%
- TD–INT: 6–11
- Passing yards: 1,375
- Passer rating: 50
- Stats at Pro Football Reference

Ronald Vander Kelen (November 6, 1939 – August 14, 2016) was an American professional football player who was a quarterback for the Minnesota Vikings of the National Football League (NFL). He played at the collegiate level for the Wisconsin Badgers and is best known for his MVP performance in the 1963 Rose Bowl, where he broke several Rose Bowl records, some of which still stand. In that game, he orchestrated a legendary fourth quarter comeback attempt against the USC Trojans in the first #1 (USC) versus #2 (Wisconsin) bowl game in college football history. Vander Kelen was inducted into the Rose Bowl Hall of Fame in 1991.

== Early life ==
Vander Kelen was born on November 6, 1939, in Preble, Wisconsin, now part of Green Bay. He graduated from Preble High School in 1958.

== College career ==
Vander Kelen played at the collegiate level at the University of Wisconsin–Madison and is best known for his MVP performance in the 1963 Rose Bowl, where he broke several Rose Bowl records, some of which still stand. In that game, he orchestrated a legendary fourth quarter comeback attempt against the USC Trojans in the first #1 (USC) versus #2 (Wisconsin) bowl game in college football history.

In August 1963, he was named the starter in the Chicago College All-Star Game (a game which pitted college all-stars selected from the graduating class from the previous season against the NFL champion) over a group of quarterbacks which included 1962 Heisman Trophy winner Terry Baker. The college all-stars defeated the Green Bay Packers 20–17, with a 74-yard touchdown completion to his college teammate, Pat Richter, providing the winning touchdown. Vander Kelen was named the game MVP. The 1963 game would prove to be the last time the college all-stars defeated the NFL champion in this series.

== NFL career ==
He was not drafted in the 1963 NFL draft and drafted in the 21st round of the 1963 AFL draft by the New York Jets. He entered into a contract with the NFL's Minnesota Vikings as an undrafted free agent. He was the backup to Fran Tarkenton from 1963 to 1966 and competed for the starting position after Tarkenton was traded to the New York Giants in 1967. Vander Kelen was then traded to the Atlanta Falcons, but never played a regular season game. Vander Kelen also saw playing time in the CFL with the 1968 Calgary Stampeders.

== Death ==
He died at the age of 76 on August 14, 2016.
