= D'Wayne Bates =

American football player (born 1975)

No. 85, 87
- Position: Wide receiver

Personal information
- Born: December 4, 1975 (age 50); Aiken, South Carolina, U.S.
- Listed height: 6 ft 2 in (1.88 m)
- Listed weight: 212 lb (96 kg)

Career information
- High school: Aiken (SC) Silver Bluff
- College: Northwestern
- NFL draft: 1999: 3rd round, 71st overall pick

Career history
- Chicago Bears (1999–2001); Minnesota Vikings (2002–2003); Tampa Bay Buccaneers (2004)*
- * Offseason or practice squad member only

Awards and highlights
- 2× First-team All-Big Ten (1996, 1998); Second-team All-Big Ten (1995)

Career NFL statistics
- Receptions: 80
- Receiving yards: 1,061
- Receiving touchdowns: 6
- Stats at Pro Football Reference

D'Wayne Lavoris Bates (born December 4, 1975) is an American former professional football player who was a wide receiver in the National Football League (NFL). Bates played three seasons with the Chicago Bears (1999-2001) and two with the Minnesota Vikings (2002-2003). Bates is best known for his achievements as a collegiate player at Northwestern University where he played for Big Ten Championship teams in 1995 and 1996. Bates was a two-time First-team All-Big Ten performer (1996 and 1998) and still holds a majority of the NU season and career receiving records.

Formerly the Assistant Principal for Athletics at Glenbard East High School in Lombard, Illinois, he accepted the Athletic Director position for 2025-2026 at Adlai E. Stevenson High School in Lincolnshire, Illinois.

== Early life ==
D'Wayne Bates was raised on a farm by a single mother in Jackson, South Carolina. He attended Silver Bluff High School where he was a highly touted, two-sport athlete in high school, excelling in baseball and football. As an outfielder, Bates was selected by the Toronto Blue Jays organization in the 53rd round of the June 1994 Major League Baseball draft. On the gridiron, Bates was an option quarterback (and free safety on defense) and was a teammate of former NFL strong safety Corey Chavous. Bates, The South Carolina State Player of the Year, Bates drew attention from ACC and SEC schools, such as NC State and Georgia. However, as National Signing Day drew closer Bates reconsidered a scholarship offered by Northwestern coach Gary Barnett. Although Northwestern was the last school that recruited him, Bates took the opportunity to leave the South to play football for the Northwestern Wildcats.

== College career ==
=== Freshman year (1995) ===
During spring practice of Bates's freshman year, injuries rendered a position move from quarterback to receiver to add depth to the scout team after injuries. Bates's collegiate debut came during an away game against Notre Dame at Notre Dame Stadium, a memorable experience for Bates, who grew up idolizing Rocket Ismail and the Fighting Irish. Entering the game, Bates and the Wildcats were 28-point underdogs to the ninth-ranked Fighting Irish. In the third quarter, Bates caught a touchdown pass from quarterback Steve Schnur stretching the NU lead to 17–9. Northwestern would hold on to win and stun Notre Dame, 17–15. Bates continued to excel throughout his freshman campaign, helping lead Northwestern to the 1996 Rose Bowl, where he had seven receptions for 145 yards in a losing effort. Bates finished 1995 with 49 catches and 889 receiving yards, both Northwestern and Big Ten Freshman Records. For his efforts, he was named second-team All-Big Ten.

=== Sophomore year (1996) ===
In his sophomore year, Bates continued his strong performance, proving that his freshman season was no fluke. Bates recorded 75 receptions, 1,196 receiving yards, and 12 receiving touchdowns, as Northwestern won their second consecutive Big Ten Championship. The 1,196 receiving yards and 12 receiving touchdowns set Northwestern team records, and following the season he was named First-team All-Big Ten.

=== Junior year (1997) ===
Expectations for Bates were high entering his Junior season, as he was named to the prestigious preseason Playboy All-American team. However, Bates suffered a broken ankle and fibula during the first game of the season against Oklahoma Sooners football, ending his season.

=== Senior year (1998) ===
Bates returned for his senior season at Northwestern, where he established career highs with 83 catches and 1,245 receiving yards. He also recorded 9 receiving touchdowns. For the second consecutive year, Bates was named First-team All-Big Ten.

At the time, Bates's career receptions (210) and career yardage (3,370) marks were good for second all-time among Big Ten receivers. Currently in the Big Ten record books, Bates ranks sixth in career receptions and seventh in career receiving yardage. Bates's reception and receiving yardage marks set Northwestern football records, which are still intact. Bates's achievements are more impressive, when one considers that he only played three full seasons.

== Northwestern Records ==
- Career Receptions: 210
- Career Receptions per game: 5.7
- Receptions by a Freshman: 49
- Career Receiving Yardage: 3,370
- Season Receiving Touchdowns: 12
- Career Receiving Touchdowns: 26
- Games Gaining 100 Yards (season): 5 (twice)
- Games Gaining 100 Yards (career): 15
- Games Catching a TD Pass (season):10
- Games Catching a TD pass (career):20

== NFL career ==
=== Chicago Bears ===
During the 1999 NFL draft, Bates was selected by the Chicago Bears in the third round as the 71st overall pick. With the Bears, Bates was used mostly on special teams or as a backup receiver during his three seasons in Chicago (1999–2001).

=== Minnesota Vikings ===
Bates became a restricted free agent in 2002. The Minnesota Vikings offered Bates a three-year $2.85 million deal, which the Bears matched on April 3, 2002. However, the Bears waived Bates the following day after failing to renegotiate his contract or trade him to another team. Bates signed with the Vikings the following week.

2002 was Bates's best season in the NFL, as he caught 50 passes for 689 yards and four touchdowns, more than triple of the 15 receptions Bates had as a member of the Bears. However, in 2003, Bates's production diminished as he only caught 15 passes for 151 yards. During the off-season, he was sent to the Tampa Bay Buccaneers, but was cut after just one month. Following his stint in Tampa, Bates returned to Evanston to train and wait for NFL free agent offers. He retired from professional football in 2005.

== After retirement ==
Around the time of his retirement, Bates began to volunteer and coach at Evanston Township High School, and was inspired to become a full-time teacher. While completing his master's work online with the University of Phoenix, Bates shadowed history and social science classes at ETHS. In 2005, Bates was inducted into the Northwestern Athletic Hall of Fame . Bates taught both U.S. and World History at ETHS. (2010) Bates spent 2012–2014 as the athletic director at LaSalle-Peru High School. As the Assistant Principal of Athletics at Glenbard East High School in Lombard, Illinois, he was offered and accepted the Athletic Director position for 2025-2026 at Adlai E. Stevenson High School in Lincolnshire, IL.
