= Whizzinator =

Device containing dried urine and a syringe

The Original Whizzinator is a product advertised as a "wet sex simulator" intended to promote simulated male urination as a safer alternative to using real urine for sexual fetish activity — but most consumers purchase the device to fraudulently defeat drug tests. The Whizzinator comes as a kit complete with dried urine and syringe, heater packs (to keep the urine at body temperature), a false penis (available in several skin tones including white, tan, Latino, brown, and black) and instruction manual. It was manufactured by Puck Technology of Signal Hill, California, a suburb of Los Angeles.

The device received media coverage in May 2005 in the United States after Onterrio Smith, a former Minnesota Vikings running back, was caught with one at the Minneapolis–St. Paul International Airport, which resulted in his suspension. Actor Tom Sizemore has also brought the Whizzinator into the public eye after having been caught with one attempting to evade drug tests.

In 2006, a Pittsburgh-area woman and her friend were charged with disorderly conduct and criminal mischief after they asked a convenience store clerk to microwave one of the devices so the woman could pass a drug test. The clerk, thinking it was a real penis, called police. The mischief charge was dropped after the friend agreed to replace the oven (OSHA regulations do not allow an oven to be used when bodily fluids are placed in it).

The United States Congress held hearings on the Whizzinator on May 17, 2005.

The Whizzinator continues to appear occasionally in news stories. In August 2015, a Chicago man on probation in Indiana was caught using the device to cheat on a mandatory drug test. He had gone to the probation office for Cook County, Illinois to take the test, and according to a police report repeatedly looked over his shoulder while urinating for the test, which drew the suspicion of a probation officer.

The Whizzinator is now marketed as an "adult novelty item" which offers a wide variety of products. The company also offers a female version of the Whizzinator, called "Whizz Kit". The difference in the products is the female versions comes with a tube and not a prosthetic penis.

== Federal fraud case ==
On October 14, 2008, the United States District Court for the Western District of Pennsylvania won a 19-count indictment against Puck Technology, maker of the Whizzinator, and its owners for fraud and selling drug paraphernalia. Prosecutors allege that by manufacturing and selling the Whizzinator, Puck Technology, company president Gerald Wills and vice president Robert Catalano conspired to defraud the Substance Abuse and Mental Health Services Administration, which administers federal workplace drug testing programs. The government sought forfeiture of all of the company's assets, including its Internet domain names.

On November 24, Puck Technology, Wills and Catalano pleaded guilty in a Pittsburgh federal court to one count of conspiracy to defraud the government and one count of conspiracy to sell drug paraphernalia. Wills and Catlano were scheduled to be sentenced in February 2009. They faced up to eight years in prison and an $800,000 fine.

In April 2010, Wills was sentenced to six months of prison, while Catalano was sentenced to three years of probation.
