= Minnesota Vikings draft history =

This page is a list of the Minnesota Vikings NFL draft selections. The first draft the Vikings participated in was the 1961 NFL draft, in which they made Tommy Mason of Tulane their first ever selection.

== Key ==
Pro Bowler
MVP
Hall of Famer

== 1961 ==
Round	Pick #	Overall	Name	Position	College
1	1	1	Tommy Mason	Running back	Tulane
2	1	15	Rip Hawkins	Linebacker	North Carolina
3	1	29	Fran Tarkenton	Quarterback	Georgia
4	1	43	Chuck Lamson	Running back	Wyoming
5	1	57	Ed Sharockman	Cornerback	Pittsburgh
6	1	71	Jerry Burch	Tight end	Georgia Tech
7	1	85	Allan Ferrie	End	Wagner
8	1	99	Paul Lindquist	Offensive tackle	New Hampshire
9	1	113	Dan Sheehan	Offensive tackle	Chattanooga
10	1	127	Doug Mayberry	Running back	Utah State
11	1	141	Jerry Mays	Defensive end	SMU
12	1	155	Steve Stonebreaker	Linebacker	Detroit
13	1	169	Ray Hayes	Running back	Central State (OK)
14	1	183	Ken Petersen	Offensive tackle	Utah
15	1	197	Mike Mercer	Placekicker	Arizona State
16	1	211	Ted Karpowicz	Running back	Detroit
17	1	225	Willie Jones	Running back	Purdue
18	1	239	Bob Voight	Offensive tackle	Los Angeles State
19	1	253	Bill Hill	Running back	Presbyterian
20	1	267	Mike McFarland	Quarterback	Western Illinois

== 1962 ==
Round	Pick #	Overall	Name	Position	College
3	2	30	Bill Miller	Wide receiver	Miami (FL)
4	3	45	Roy Winston	Linebacker	Louisiana State
6	3	73	Larry Bowie	Guard	Purdue
8	3	101	Paul White	Running back	Florida
9	2	114	Marshall Shirk	Tackle	UCLA
12	3	157	Gary Fallon	Back	Syracuse
13	2	170	Roger Van Cleef	Tackle	Southwestern Oklahoma
14	3	185	Patrick Russ	Tackle	Purdue
15	2	198	Larry Guilford	End	Pacific
16	3	213	John Contoulis	Tackle	Connecticut
17	2	226	Ron Staley	End	Wisconsin
18	3	241	Junior Hawthorne	Tackle	Kentucky
19	2	254	Tommy Minteer	Back	Baylor
20	3	269	Terry Cagaanan	Back	Utah State

== 1963 ==
Round	Pick #	Overall	Name	Position	College
1	3	3	Jim Dunaway	Defensive tackle	Mississippi
2	2	16	Bobby Bell	Linebacker	Minnesota
3	3	31	Ray Poage	Tight end	Texas
4	2	44	Paul Flatley	Wide receiver	Northwestern
5	3	59	Gary Kaltenbach	Tackle	Pittsburgh
8	2	100	Jim O'Mahoney	Linebacker	Miami (FL)
9	3	115	Bob Hoover	Running back	Florida
10	2	128	Terry Kosens	Safety	Hofstra
11	3	143	John Campbell	Linebacker	Minnesota
12	2	156	John Sklopan	Defensive back	Southern Mississippi
13	3	171	Dave O'Brien	Offensive tackle	Boston College
14	2	184	Ralph Ferrisi	Back	Southern Connecticut State
15	3	199	John Murio	End	Whitworth
16	2	212	Rex Mirich	Defensive tackle	Northern Arizona
17	3	227	Tom Munsey	Back	Concord
18	2	240	Tom McIntyre	Tackle	Saint John's (MN)
19	3	255	Frank Horvath	Back	Youngstown State
20	2	268	Mailon Kent	Back	Auburn

== 1964 ==
Round	Pick #	Overall	Name	Position	College
1	6	6	Carl Eller	Defensive end	Minnesota
2	5	19	Hal Bedsole	Tight end	USC
3	6	34	George Rose	Cornerback	Auburn
4	11	53	Tom Keating	Defensive tackle	Michigan
5	6	62	John Kirby	Linebacker	Nebraska
6	5	75	Bob Lacey	End	North Carolina
7	6	90	Wes Bryant	Tackle	Arkansas
8	5	103	Bill McWatters	Fullback	North Texas State
9	6	118	Darrell Lester	Running back	McNeese State
11	6	146	H.O. Estes	Guard	East Central (OK)
12	5	159	Sandy Sands	End	Texas
13	6	174	Russ Vollmer	Running back	Memphis State
14	5	187	Tom Michel	Running back	East Carolina
15	6	202	Monte Kiffin	Tackle	Nebraska
16	5	215	Carlton Oats	Defensive end	Florida A&M
17	6	230	Jerry McClurg	End	Colorado
18	5	243	Carl Robinson	Tackle	Prairie View A&M
19	6	258	Dick Schott	End	Louisville
20	5	271	Milt Sunde	Guard	Minnesota

== 1965 ==
Round	Pick #	Overall	Name	Position	College
1	8	8	Jack Snow	Wide receiver	Notre Dame
2	1	15	Archie Sutton	Offensive tackle	Illinois
2	9	23	Lance Rentzel	Wide receiver	Oklahoma
4	9	51	Jim Whalen	Tight end	Boston College
4	13	55	Jim Harris	Defensive tackle	Utah State
6	9	79	Jim Grisham	Back	Oklahoma
8	2	100	John Hankinson	Quarterback	Minnesota
8	9	107	Jeff Jordon	Back	Tulsa
9	8	120	Frank McClendon	Tackle	Alabama
10	9	135	Jerald Schweiger	Tackle	Wisconsin-Superior
11	8	148	John Thomas	End	USC
12	9	163	Mike Tilleman	Defensive tackle	Montana
13	8	176	Dave Osborn	Running back	North Dakota
14	9	191	Max Leetzow	Defensive end	Idaho
15	8	204	Phillip Morgan	End	East Tennessee State
16	9	219	Paul Labinski	Tackle	Saint John's (MN)
17	8	232	Veran Smith	Back	Utah State
18	9	247	Rich Kotite	Tight end	Wagner
19	8	260	Ellis Johnson	Running back	Southeastern Louisiana
20	9	275	Cosmo Iacavazzi	Running back	Princeton

== 1966 ==
Round	Pick #	Overall	Name	Position	College
1	7	7	Jerry Shay	Defensive tackle	Purdue
2	11	27	Jim Lindsey	Running back	Arkansas
3	10	42	Don Hansen	Linebacker	Illinois
4	9	57	Ron Acks	Linebacker	Illinois
5	8	72	Doug Davis	Offensive tackle	Kentucky
5	12	76	Bob Hall	Defensive back	Brown
6	3	83	Wilbur Aylor	Tackle	Texas State
7	11	106	Bob Meers	End	Massachusetts
9	9	134	Ron Green	Wide receiver	North Dakota
11	7	162	Stan Quintana	Defensive back	New Mexico
12	11	181	Bob Petrella	Defensive back	Tennessee
13	10	195	Larry Martin	Defensive tackle	San Diego State
14	9	209	Howard Twilley	Wide receiver	Tulsa
15	8	223	Hugh Wright	Running back	Adams State
16	7	237	Jim Williams	Defensive end	Arkansas
17	11	256	Monroe Bear	Running back	Virginia Union
18	10	270	Dale Greco	Defensive tackle	Illinois
19	9	284	Jesse Stokes	Defensive back	Corpus Christi State

== 1967 ==
Round	Pick #	Overall	Name	Position	College
1	2	2	Clinton Jones	Running back	Michigan State
1	8	8	Gene Washington	Wide receiver	Michigan State
1	15	15	Alan Page	Defensive tackle	Notre Dame
2	2	28	Bob Grim	Wide receiver	Oregon State
3	8	61	Earl Denny	Wide receiver	Missouri
4	7	87	Alvin Coleman	Defensive back	Tennessee A&I
5	8	115	Ken Last	Wide receiver	Minnesota
7	8	167	Bobby Bryant	Cornerback	South Carolina
8	12	197	John Beasley	Tight end	California
9	8	219	Bill Morris	Guard	Holy Cross
10	7	244	Pete Tatman	Running back	Nebraska
11	8	271	Bob Trygstad	Defensive tackle	Washington State
12	6	296	Fred Cremer	Guard	Saint John's (MN)
13	8	323	Charles Hardt	Defensive back	Tulsa
14	7	348	Jimmy Hargrove	Linebacker	Howard Payne
15	8	375	Jimmy Shea	Defensive back	Eastern New Mexico
16	7	400	Gene Beard	Defensive back	Virginia Union
17	8	427	Todd Vandal	Defensive back	North Dakota State

== 1968 ==
Round	Pick #	Overall	Name	Position	College
1	1	1	Ron Yary	Offensive tackle	USC
2	6	33	Charlie West	Safety	UTEP
3	21	76	Mike McGill	Linebacker	Notre Dame
4	6	89	Mike Freeman	Cornerback	Fresno State
6	6	144	Bob Goodridge	Wide receiver	Vanderbilt
7	2	167	Oscar Reed	Running back	Colorado State
7	6	171	Lenny Snow	Running back	Georgia Tech
8	6	198	Hank Urbanowicz	Defensive tackle	Miami (FL)
9	6	225	Mike Donohoe	Tight end	San Francisco
10	4	250	Tom Sakal	Defensive back	Minnesota
11	6	279	Bill Haas	Wide receiver	Nebraska-Omaha
12	8	308	Howie Small	Center	Rhode Island
13	6	333	Rich Wherry	Wide receiver	Northern State (SD)
14	6	360	Don Evans	Tackle	Arkansas-Pine Bluff
15	6	387	Jim Haynie	Quarterback	West Chester (PA)
16	6	414	Larry Kuharich	Defensive back	Boston College
17	6	441	Bob Lee	Quarterback	Pacific
17	10	445	Bill Hull	Guard	Tennessee Tech

== 1969 ==
Round	Pick #	Overall	Name	Position	College
2	13	39	Ed White	Guard	California
2	17	43	Volly Murphy	Wide receiver	UTEP
4	17	95	Mike McCaffery	Linebacker	California
5	2	106	Jim Barnes	Guard	Arkansas
5	8	112	Mike O'Shea	Wide receiver	Utah State
5	17	121	Corny Davis	Running back	Kansas State
6	18	148	Marion Bates	Defensive back	Texas Southern
8	17	199	Harris Wood	Wide receiver	Washington
9	17	225	Tom Fink	Guard	Minnesota
10	19	253	Tom McCauley	Defensive back	Wisconsin
11	17	277	Brian Dowling	Quarterback	Yale
12	17	303	Noel Jenke	Linebacker	Minnesota
13	12	329	Jim Moylan	Defensive tackle	Texas Tech
14	17	355	Tommy Head	Center	Southwest Texas State
15	17	381	Eugene Mosley	Tight end	Jackson State
17	17	433	Wendell Housely	Running back	Texas A&M

== 1970 ==
Round	Pick #	Overall	Name	Position	College
1	25	25	John Ward	Tackle	Oklahoma State
2	25	51	Bill Cappleman	Quarterback	Florida State
3	25	77	Chuck Burgoon	Linebacker	North Park
5	25	129	Greg Jones	Running back	UCLA
7	25	181	Hap Farber	Linebacker	Mississippi
8	25	207	Mike Carroll	Guard	Missouri
9	25	233	George Morrow	Defensive end	Mississippi
10	25	259	Stu Voigt	Tight end	Wisconsin
11	25	285	Godfrey Zaunbrecher	Center	Louisiana State
12	25	311	James Holland	Defensive back	Jackson State
13	25	337	Robert Pearce	Defensive back	Stephen F. Austin
14	25	363	Tommy Spinks	Wide receiver	Louisiana Tech
15	25	389	Bennie Francis	Defensive end	Chadron State
16	25	415	Bruce Cerone	Wide receiver	Emporia State
17	25	441	Brian Healy	Defensive back	Michigan

== 1971 ==
Round	Pick #	Overall	Name	Position	College
1	24	24	Leo Hayden	Running back	Ohio State
3	24	76	Eddie Hackett	Wide receiver	Alcorn State
4	24	102	Vince Clements	Running back	Connecticut
7	24	180	Gene Mack	Linebacker	UTEP
8	26	208	John Farley	Defensive end	Johnson C. Smith
9	24	232	Tim Sullivan	Running back	Iowa
10	24	258	Chris Morris	Guard	Indiana
11	24	284	Mike Walker	Linebacker	Tulane
12	24	310	Reggie Holmes	Defensive back	Wisconsin-Stout
13	24	336	Benny Fry	Center	Houston
14	24	362	Jim Gallagher	Linebacker	Yale
15	24	388	Jeff Wright	Safety	Minnesota
16	23	413	Greg Edmonds	Wide receiver	Penn State
17	23	439	Ken Duncan	Punter	Tulsa

== 1972 ==
Round	Pick #	Overall	Name	Position	College
1	10	10	Jeff Siemon	Linebacker	Stanford
2	24	50	Ed Marinaro	Running back	Cornell
3	7	59	Bart Buetow	Tackle	Minnesota
6	24	154	Amos Martin	Linebacker	Louisville
7	25	181	Bill Slater	Defensive end	Western Michigan
8	24	206	Calvin Demery	Wide receiver	Arizona State
9	24	232	Charlie Goodrum	Guard	Florida A&M
10	24	258	Willie Aldridge	Running back	South Carolina State
11	24	284	Willie McKelton	Defensive back	Southern
12	24	310	Bob Banaugh	Defensive back	Montana State
13	24	336	Franklin Roberts	Running back	Alcorn State
14	23	361	Marv Owens	Running back	San Diego State
15	24	388	Mike Sivert	Guard	East Tennessee State
16	24	414	Neil Graff	Quarterback	Wisconsin
17	24	440	Dick Schmalz	Wide receiver	Auburn

== 1973 ==
Round	Pick #	Overall	Name	Position	College
1	12	12	Chuck Foreman	Running back	Miami (FL)
2	8	34	Jackie Wallace	Cornerback	Arizona
3	13	65	Jim Lash	Wide receiver	Northwestern
4	2	80	Mike Wells	Quarterback	Illinois
5	14	118	Brent McClanahan	Running back	Arizona State
6	9	139	Doug Kingsriter	Tight end	Minnesota
6	13	143	Fred Abbott	Linebacker	Florida
7	12	168	Josh Brown	Running back	Southwest Texas State
8	14	196	Craig Darling	Tackle	Iowa
9	13	221	Larry Dibbles	Defensive end	New Mexico
10	2	236	Randy Lee	Defensive back	Tulane
10	12	246	Dave Mason	Safety	Nebraska
11	14	274	Geary Murdock	Guard	Iowa State
12	13	299	Alan Spencer	Wide receiver	Pittsburg State
13	12	324	Ron Just	Guard	Minot State
14	14	352	Eddie Bishop	Defensive back	Southern
15	13	377	Tony Chandler	Running back	Missouri Valley
16	12	402	Larry Smiley	Defensive end	Texas Southern
17	13	429	Dave Winfield	Tight end	Minnesota

== 1974 ==
Round	Pick #	Overall	Name	Position	College
1	17	17	Fred McNeill	Linebacker	UCLA
1	25	25	Steve Riley	Offensive tackle	USC
2	3	29	John Holland	Wide receiver	Tennessee State
2	25	51	Matt Blair	Linebacker	Iowa State
3	12	64	Steve Craig	Tight end	Northwestern
4	8	86	Mike Townsend	Defensive back	Notre Dame
5	16	120	Jim Ferguson	Defensive back	Stanford
6	25	155	Mark Kellar	Running back	Northern Illinois
7	25	181	Fred Tabron	Running back	Southwest Missouri State
8	25	207	Berl Simmons	Kicker	Texas Christian
9	24	232	Sam McCullum	Wide receiver	Montana State
10	25	259	Barry Reed	Running back	Peru State
11	25	285	David Boone	Defensive end	Eastern Michigan
12	25	311	Randy Poltl	Safety	Stanford
13	25	337	Gary Keller	Defensive tackle	Utah
14	25	363	Alan Dixon	Running back	Harding
15	25	389	Kurt Wachtler	Defensive tackle	Saint John's (MN)
16	25	415	John Gobel	Running back	St. Thomas (MN)
17	25	441	Earl Garrett	Defensive back	Massachusetts-Boston

== 1975 ==
Round	Pick #	Overall	Name	Position	College
1	25	25	Mark Mullaney	Defensive end	Colorado State
2	26	52	Art Riley	Defensive tackle	USC
4	11	89	Champ Henson	Fullback	Ohio State
4	25	103	Bruce Adams	Wide receiver	Kansas
5	25	129	Robert Miller	Running back	Kansas
6	25	155	Bubba Broussard	Linebacker	Houston
7	25	181	Henry Green	Running back	Southern
8	25	207	Joe Hollimon	Defensive back	Arkansas State
9	25	233	John Passananti	Guard	Western Illinois
10	24	258	Neil Clabo	Punter	Tennessee
11	25	285	Ike Spencer	Running back	Utah
12	25	311	Autry Beamon	Cornerback	East Texas State
13	24	336	Mike Hurd	Wide receiver	Michigan State
14	25	363	Mike Strickland	Running back	Eastern Michigan
15	24	388	Ollie Bakken	Linebacker	Minnesota
16	24	414	Tom Goedjen	Kicker	Iowa State
17	25	441	Adolph Bellizeare	Running back	Pennsylvania

== 1976 ==
Round	Pick #	Overall	Name	Position	College
1	25	25	James White	Defensive tackle	Oklahoma State
2	26	54	Sammy White	Wide receiver	Grambling State
3	25	85	Wes Hamilton	Guard	Tulsa
4	26	118	Leonard Willis	Wide receiver	Ohio State
5	9	133	Steve Wagner	Defensive back	Wisconsin
5	25	149	Keith Barnette	Running back	Boston College
6	24	180	Terry Egerdahl	Defensive back	Minnesota–Duluth
7	24	206	Larry Brune	Safety	Rice
9	25	262	Isaac Hagins	Wide receiver	Southern
10	24	289	Bill Salmon	Quarterback	Northern Iowa
11	25	316	Steve Kracher	Running back	Montana State
12	26	345	Robert Sparks	Defensive back	San Francisco State
13	25	372	Gary Paulson	Defensive end	Colorado State
14	26	401	Jeff Stapleton	Tackle	Purdue
15	25	428	Ron Groce	Running back	Macalester
16	26	457	Randy Hickel	Defensive back	Montana State
17	25	484	Dick Lukowski	Defensive tackle	West Virginia

== 1977 ==
Round	Pick #	Overall	Name	Position	College
1	27	27	Tommy Kramer	Quarterback	Rice
2	27	55	Dennis Swilley	Center	Texas A&M
3	27	83	Tom Hannon	Safety	Michigan State
5	26	138	Ken Moore	Tight end	Northern Illinois
8	27	222	Clint Strozier	Defensive back	USC
9	27	250	Scott Studwell	Linebacker	Illinois
10	27	278	Dan Beaver	Kicker	Illinois
11	27	306	Keith Hartwig	Wide receiver	Arizona
12	27	335	Jim Kelleher	Running back	Colorado

== 1978 ==
Round	Pick #	Overall	Name	Position	College
1	21	21	Randy Holloway	Defensive end	Pittsburgh
2	20	48	John Turner	Cornerback	Miami (FL)
3	19	75	Whip Walton	Linebacker	San Diego State
4	16	100	Jim Hough	Center	Utah State
8	10	204	Mike Wood	Kicker	Southeast Missouri State
9	18	240	Mike Deutsch	Punter	Colorado State
10	22	272	Hughie Shaw	Running back	Texas A&I
11	21	299	Ron Harris	Running back	Colorado State
12	20	326	Jeff Morrow	Tackle	Minnesota

== 1979 ==
Round	Pick #	Overall	Name	Position	College
1	16	16	Ted Brown	Running back	North Carolina State
2	15	43	Dave Huffman	Center	Notre Dame
4	15	97	Steve Dils	Quarterback	Stanford
5	19	129	Jerry Meter	Linebacker	Michigan
6	15	152	Joe Senser	Tight end	West Chester (PA)
7	16	181	Bob Winkel	Defensive tackle	Kentucky
9	16	236	Billy Diggs	Wide receiver	Winston-Salem State
11	16	291	Brian Nelson	Wide receiver	Texas Tech
12	14	317	David Stephens	Linebacker	Kentucky

== 1980 ==
Round	Pick #	Overall	Name	Position	College
1	9	9	Doug Martin	Defensive end	Washington
2	2	30	Willie Teal	Cornerback	Louisiana State
3	12	68	Brent Boyd	Guard	UCLA
4	9	92	Dennis Johnson	Linebacker	USC
5	11	121	Doug Paschal	Running back	North Carolina
5	12	122	Paul Jones	Running back	California
6	10	148	Ray Yakavonis	Defensive end	East Stroudsburg
7	9	174	Henry Johnson	Linebacker	Georgia Tech
9	11	232	Dennis Mosley	Running back	Iowa
11	11	288	Sam Harrell	Running back	East Carolina
12	10	315	Thomas Lane	Defensive back	Florida A&M

== 1981 ==
Round	Pick #	Overall	Name	Position	College
2	11	39	Mardye McDole	Wide receiver	Mississippi State
2	17	45	Robin Sendlein	Linebacker	Texas
2	24	52	Jarvis Redwine	Running back	Nebraska
3	18	74	Tim Irwin	Offensive tackle	Tennessee
4	18	101	John Swain	Cornerback	Miami (FL)
5	12	123	Wendell Ray	Defensive end	Missouri
7	18	184	Don Shaver	Running back	Kutztown
8	17	210	Wade Wilson	Quarterback	East Texas State
10	18	266	James Murphy	Wide receiver	Utah State
11	17	293	Bill Stephanos	Tackle	Boston College
12	16	320	Brian Williams	Tight end	Southern

== 1982 ==
Round	Pick #	Overall	Name	Position	College
1	7	7	Darrin Nelson	Running back	Stanford
2	12	39	Terry Tausch	Guard	Texas
4	9	92	Jim Fahnhorst	Linebacker	Minnesota
6	8	147	Greg Storr	Linebacker	Boston College
7	12	179	Steve Jordan	Tight end	Brown
8	11	206	Kirk Harmon	Linebacker	Pacific
9	10	233	Bryan Howard	Safety	Tennessee State
10	9	260	Gerald Lucear	Wide receiver	Temple
11	7	286	Curtis Rouse	Guard	Tennessee-Chattanooga
12	12	318	Hobson Milner	Running back	Cincinnati

== 1983 ==
Round	Pick #	Overall	Name	Position	College
1	19	19	Joey Browner	Safety	USC
3	17	73	Walker Lee Ashley	Linebacker	Penn State
4	16	100	Mark Rush	Running back	Miami (FL)
5	15	127	Mark Stewart	Linebacker	Washington
6	19	159	Mike Jones	Wide receiver	Tennessee State
7	18	186	Carl Lee	Cornerback	Marshall
8	17	213	Norris Brown	Tight end	Georgia
9	15	239	Rod Achter	Wide receiver	Toledo
10	4	255	Melvin Brown	Defensive back	Mississippi
10	15	266	Walter Tate	Center	Tennessee State
11	19	298	Brian Butcher	Guard	Clemson
12	18	325	Maurice Turner	Running back	Utah State

== 1984 ==
Round	Pick #	Overall	Name	Position	College
1	13	13	Keith Millard	Defensive tackle	Washington State
3	11	67	Alfred Anderson	Running back	Baylor
5	28	140	Allen Rice	Running back	Baylor
6	14	154	Dwight Collins	Wide receiver	Pittsburgh
7	12	180	John Haines	Defensive tackle	Texas
7	28	196	Lloyd Lewis	Guard	Texas A&I
8	12	208	Paul Sverchek	Defensive tackle	Cal Poly
9	11	235	Keith Kidd	Wide receiver	Arkansas
10	16	268	James Spencer	Linebacker	Oklahoma State
11	15	295	Edgar Pickett	Linebacker	Clemson
12	14	322	Mike Jones	Running back	North Carolina A&T

== 1985 ==
Round	Pick #	Overall	Name	Position	College
1	4	4	Chris Doleman	Defensive end	Pittsburgh
2	2	30	Issiac Holt	Cornerback	Alcorn State
3	3	59	Kirk Lowdermilk	Center	Ohio State
3	4	60	Tim Meamber	Linebacker	Washington
3	10	66	Tim Long	Offensive tackle	Memphis State
4	1	85	Buster Rhymes	Wide receiver	Oklahoma
4	22	106	Kyle Morrell	Safety	Brigham Young
5	3	115	Mark MacDonald	Guard	Boston College
6	2	142	Steve Bono	Quarterback	UCLA
6	24	164	Tim Newton	Defensive tackle	Florida
8	2	198	Nikita Blair	Linebacker	UTEP
9	3	227	Jamie Covington	Running back	Syracuse
10	2	254	Juan Johnson	Wide receiver	Langston
11	3	283	Tim Williams	Defensive back	North Carolina A&T
12	2	310	Byron Jones	Defensive tackle	Tulsa

== 1986 ==
Round	Pick #	Overall	Name	Position	College
1	14	14	Gerald Robinson	Defensive end	Auburn
4	11	93	Joe Phillips	Defensive tackle	Southern Methodist
5	10	120	Hassan Jones	Wide receiver	Florida State
6	9	147	Thomas Rooks	Running back	Illinois
7	13	179	Carl Hilton	Tight end	Houston
8	12	206	Gary Schippang	Offensive tackle	West Chester (PA)
9	11	232	Mike Slaton	Defensive back	South Dakota
10	10	259	Joe Cormier	Wide receiver	USC
11	9	286	John Armstrong	Wide receiver	Richmond
12	13	318	Jesse Solomon	Linebacker	Florida State

== 1987 ==
Round	Pick #	Overall	Name	Position	College
1	14	14	D. J. Dozier	Running back	Penn State
2	16	44	Ray Berry	Linebacker	Baylor
3	16	72	Henry Thomas	Defensive tackle	Louisiana State
4	16	100	Najee Mustafaa	Safety	Georgia Tech
6	16	156	Greg Richardson	Wide receiver	Alabama
8	16	211	Rick Fenney	Running back	Washington
9	16	239	Leonard Jones	Defensive back	Texas Tech
10	16	267	Bob Riley	Offensive tackle	Indiana State
11	16	295	Brent Pease	Quarterback	Montana
12	16	323	Keith Williams	Defensive tackle	Florida

== 1988 ==
Round	Pick #	Overall	Name	Position	College
1	19	19	Randall McDaniel	Guard	Arizona State
2	27	54	Brad Edwards	Safety	South Carolina
3	16	71	Al Noga	Defensive end	Hawaii
4	26	108	Todd Kalis	Guard	Arizona State
5	15	124	Darrell Fullington	Safety	Miami (FL)
6	27	164	Derrick White	Defensive back	Oklahoma
7	18	183	Brad Beckman	Tight end	Nebraska-Omaha
8	17	210	Joe Cain	Linebacker	Oregon Tech
9	16	237	Paul McGowan	Linebacker	Florida State
10	15	264	Brian Habib	Guard	Washington
11	19	296	Norman Floyd	Defensive back	South Carolina

== 1989 ==
Round	Pick #	Overall	Name	Position	College
2	24	52	David Braxton	Linebacker	Wake Forest
3	24	80	John Hunter	Tackle	Brigham Young
4	24	108	Darryl Ingram	Tight end	California
6	24	163	Jeff Mickel	Tackle	Eastern Washington
7	24	191	Benji Roland	Defensive tackle	Auburn
8	24	219	Alex Stewart	Defensive end	Cal State Fullerton
11	24	303	Brad Baxter	Running back	Alabama State
12	24	331	Shawn Woodson	Linebacker	James Madison
12	28	335	Everett Ross	Wide receiver	Ohio State

== 1990 ==
Round	Pick #	Overall	Name	Position	College
3	1	54	Mike Jones	Tight end	Texas A&M
3	21	74	Marion Hobby	Defensive end	Tennessee
4	23	104	Alonzo Hampton	Cornerback	Pittsburgh
5	7	116	Reggie Thornton	Wide receiver	Bowling Green
5	22	131	Cedric Smith	Running back	Florida
7	23	188	John Levelis	Linebacker	C.W. Post
8	21	214	Craig Schlichting	Defensive end	Wyoming
9	21	241	Terry Allen	Running back	Clemson
10	1	249	Pat Newman	Wide receiver	Utah State
10	23	271	Donald Smith	Defensive back	Liberty
12	20	324	Ron Goetz	Linebacker	Minnesota

== 1991 ==
Round	Pick #	Overall	Name	Position	College
3	10	65	Carlos Jenkins	Linebacker	Michigan State
3	13	68	Jake Reed	Wide receiver	Grambling
4	9	92	Randy Baldwin	Running back	Mississippi
5	8	119	Chris Thorne	Center	Minnesota
6	24	163	Todd Scott	Safety	Southwestern Louisiana
7	12	179	Scotty Reagan	Defensive tackle	Humboldt State
7	13	180	Tripp Welborne	Safety	Michigan
8	11	206	Reggie Johnson	Defensive end	Arizona
9	9	232	Gerald Hudson	Running back	Oklahoma State
10	9	259	Brady Pierce	Tackle	Wisconsin
11	8	286	Ivan Caesar	Linebacker	Boston College
12	7	313	Darren Hughes	Wide receiver	Carson–Newman

== 1992 ==
Round	Pick #	Overall	Name	Position	College
2	11	39	Robert Harris	Defensive end	Southern
4	14	98	Roy Barker	Defensive end	North Carolina
5	13	125	Ed McDaniel	Linebacker	Clemson Tigers football
6	12	152	Mike Gaddis	Running back	Oklahoma
7	15	183	David Wilson	Safety	California
8	14	210	Luke Fisher	Tight end	East Carolina
9	3	227	Brad Johnson	Quarterback	Florida State
9	13	237	Ronnie West	Wide receiver	Pittsburg State
10	12	264	Brad Culpepper	Defensive tackle	Florida
11	15	295	Chuck Evans	Fullback	Clark Atlanta
12	14	322	Joe Randolph	Wide receiver	Elon

== 1993 ==
Round	Pick #	Overall	Name	Position	College
1	21	21	Robert Smith	Running back	Ohio State
2	23	52	Qadry Ismail	Wide receiver	Syracuse
3	1	57	John Gerak	Guard	Penn State
3	23	79	Gilbert Brown	Defensive tackle	Kansas
4	22	106	Ashley Sheppard	Linebacker	Clemson
5	21	133	Everett Lindsay	Guard	Mississippi
7	24	192	Gino Torretta	Quarterback	Miami (FL)

== 1994 ==
Round	Pick #	Overall	Name	Position	College
1	18	18	Dewayne Washington	Cornerback	North Carolina State
1	19	19	Todd Steussie	Offensive tackle	California
2	11	40	David Palmer	Wide receiver	Alabama
2	26	55	Fernando Smith	Defensive end	Jackson State
4	22	125	Mike Wells	Defensive tackle	Iowa
5	3	134	Shelly Hammonds	Defensive back	Penn State
6	18	179	Andrew Jordan	Tight end	Western Carolina
7	17	211	Pete Bercich	Linebacker	Notre Dame

== 1995 ==
Round	Pick #	Overall	Name	Position	College
1	11	11	Derrick Alexander	Defensive end	Florida State
1	24	24	Korey Stringer	Offensive tackle	Ohio State
2	10	42	Orlando Thomas	Safety	Southwestern Louisiana
2	23	55	Corey Fuller	Safety	Florida State
4	13	111	Chad May	Quarterback	Kansas State
5	23	157	James Stewart	Running back	Miami (FL)
6	18	189	John Solomon	Linebacker	Sam Houston State
7	24	232	Jose White	Linebacker	Howard
7	35	243	Jason Fisk	Defensive tackle	Stanford

== 1996 ==
Round	Pick #	Overall	Name	Position	College
1	16	16	Duane Clemons	Defensive end	California
2	15	45	James Manley	Defensive tackle	Vanderbilt
3	14	75	Moe Williams	Running back	Kentucky
4	2	97	Hunter Goodwin	Tight end	Texas A&M
5	16	148	Sean Boyd	Safety	North Carolina
7	14	223	Jon Merrill	Offensive tackle	Duke

== 1997 ==
Round	Pick #	Overall	Name	Position	College
1	20	20	Dwayne Rudd	Linebacker	Alabama
2	19	49	Torrian Gray	Safety	Virginia Tech
3	18	78	Stalin Colinet	Defensive end	Boston College
4	17	113	Antonio Banks	Defensive back	Virginia Tech
5	21	151	Tony Williams	Defensive tackle	Memphis
6	20	183	Robert Tate	Cornerback	Cincinnati
7	19	220	Artie Ulmer	Linebacker	Valdosta State
7	34	235	Matthew Hatchette	Wide receiver	Langston

== 1998 ==
Round	Pick #	Overall	Name	Position	College
1	21	21	Randy Moss	Wide receiver	Marshall
2	21	51	Kailee Wong	Linebacker	Stanford
3	19	80	Ramos McDonald	Cornerback	New Mexico
4	18	110	Kivuusama Mays	Linebacker	North Carolina
5	21	144	Kerry Cooks	Safety	Iowa
6	20	173	Matt Birk	Center	Harvard
7	19	208	Chester Burnett	Linebacker	Arizona
7	36	225	Tony Darden	Cornerback	Texas Tech

== 1999 ==
Round	Pick #	Overall	Name	Position	College
1	11	11	Daunte Culpepper	Quarterback	Central Florida
1	29	29	Dimitrius Underwood	Defensive end	Michigan State
2	13	44	Jim Kleinsasser	Tight end	North Dakota
4	25	120	Kenny Wright	Cornerback	Northwestern State
4	30	125	Jay Humphrey	Offensive tackle	Texas
5	36	169	Chris Jones	Safety	Clemson
6	16	185	Talance Sawyer	Defensive tackle	UNLV
6	30	199	Antico Dalton	Linebacker	Hampton
7	30	236	Noel Scarlett	Defensive end	Langston

== 2000 ==
Round	Pick #	Overall	Name	Position	College
1	25	25	Chris Hovan	Defensive tackle	Boston College
2	24	55	Fred Robbins	Defensive tackle	Wake Forest
2	25	56	Michael Boireau	Defensive tackle	Miami (FL)
3	26	88	Doug Chapman	Running back	Marshall
4	12	106	Antonio Wilson	Linebacker	Texas A&M-Commerce
4	24	118	Tyrone Carter	Safety	Minnesota
5	36	165	Troy Walters	Wide receiver	Stanford
7	34	240	Mike Malano	Center	San Diego State
7	38	244	Giles Cole	Tight end	Texas A&M-Kingsville
7	42	248	Lewis Kelly	Guard	South Carolina State

== 2001 ==
Round	Pick #	Overall	Name	Position	College
1	27	27	Michael Bennett	Running back	Wisconsin
2	26	57	Willie Howard	Defensive end	Stanford
3	7	69	Eric Kelly	Cornerback	Kentucky
4	35	130	Shawn Worthen	Defensive tackle	Texas Christian
4	36	131	Cedric James	Wide receiver	Texas Christian
5	26	157	Patrick Chukwurah	Defensive end	Wyoming
6	26	189	Carey Scott	Cornerback	Kentucky State
7	25	225	Brian Crawford	Offensive tackle	Western Oregon

== 2002 ==
Round	Pick #	Overall	Name	Position	College
1	7	7	Bryant McKinnie	Offensive tackle	Miami (FL)
2	6	38	Raonall Smith	Linebacker	Washington State
3	5	70	Willie Offord	Safety	South Carolina
4	7	105	Brian Williams	Cornerback	North Carolina State
4	34	132	Ed Ta'amu	Guard	Utah
6	5	177	Nick Rogers	Linebacker	Georgia Tech
7	7	218	Chad Beasley	Offensive tackle	Virginia Tech

== 2003 ==
Round	Pick #	Overall	Name	Position	College
1	9	9	Kevin Williams	Defensive tackle	Oklahoma State
2	8	40	E. J. Henderson	Linebacker	Maryland
3	7	71	Nate Burleson	Wide receiver	Nevada
4	8	105	Onterrio Smith	Running back	Oregon
6	7	180	Eddie Johnson	Punter	Idaho State
6	17	190	Michael Nattiel	Linebacker	Florida
7	7	221	Keenan Howry	Wide receiver	Oregon

== 2004 ==
Round	Pick #	Overall	Name	Position	College
1	20	20	Kenechi Udeze	Defensive end	USC
2	16	48	Dontarrious Thomas	Linebacker	Auburn
3	25	88	Darrion Scott	Defensive end	Ohio State
4	19	115	Nat Dorsey	Offensive tackle	Georgia Tech
4	23	119	Mewelde Moore	Running back	Tulane
5	23	155	Rod Davis	Linebacker	Southern Miss
6	19	184	Deandre' Eiland	Safety	South Carolina
7	19	220	Jeff Dugan	Tight end	Maryland

== 2005 ==
Round	Pick #	Overall	Name	Position	College
1	7	7	Troy Williamson	Wide receiver	South Carolina
1	18	18	Erasmus James	Defensive end	Wisconsin
2	17	49	Marcus Johnson	Guard	Mississippi
3	16	80	Dustin Fox	Cornerback	Ohio State
4	11	112	Ciatrick Fason	Running back	Florida
6	17	191	C. J. Mosley	Defensive end	Missouri
7	5	219	Adrian Ward	Cornerback	UTEP

== 2006 ==
Round	Pick #	Overall	Name	Position	College
1	17	17	Chad Greenway	Linebacker	Iowa
2	16	48	Cedric Griffin	Cornerback	Texas
2	19	51	Ryan Cook	Offensive tackle	New Mexico
2	32	64	Tarvaris Jackson	Quarterback	Alabama State
4	30	127	Ray Edwards	Defensive end	Purdue
5	17	149	Greg Blue	Safety	Georgia

== 2007 ==
Round	Pick #	Overall	Name	Position	College
1	7	7	Adrian Peterson	Running back	Oklahoma
2	12	44	Sidney Rice	Wide receiver	South Carolina
3	8	72	Marcus McCauley	Cornerback	Fresno State
4	3	102	Brian Robison	Defensive end	Texas
5	9	146	Aundrae Allison	Wide receiver	East Carolina
6	2	176	Rufus Alexander	Linebacker	Oklahoma
7	7	217	Tyler Thigpen	Quarterback	Coastal Carolina
7	23	233	Chandler Williams	Wide receiver	Florida International

== 2008 ==
Round	Pick #	Overall	Name	Position	College
2	12	43	Tyrell Johnson	Safety	Arkansas State
5	2	137	John David Booty	Quarterback	USC
5	17	152	Letroy Guion	Defensive tackle	Florida State
6	21	187	John Sullivan	Center	Notre Dame
6	27	193	Jaymar Johnson	Wide receiver	Jackson State

== 2009 ==
Round	Pick #	Overall	Name	Position	College
1	22	22	Percy Harvin	Wide receiver	Florida
2	22	54	Phil Loadholt	Offensive tackle	Oklahoma
3	22	86	Asher Allen	Cornerback	Georgia
5	14	150	Jasper Brinkley	Linebacker	South Carolina
7	22	231	Jamarca Sanford	Safety	Mississippi

== 2010 ==
Round	Pick #	Overall	Name	Position	College
2	2	34	Chris Cook	Cornerback	Virginia
2	19	51	Toby Gerhart	Running back	Stanford
4	2	100	Everson Griffen	Defensive end	USC
5	30	161	Chris DeGeare	Guard	Wake Forest
5	36	167	Nathan Triplett	Linebacker	Minnesota
6	30	199	Joe Webb	Quarterback	UAB
7	7	214	Mickey Shuler Jr.	Tight end	Penn State
7	30	237	Ryan D'Imperio	Fullback	Rutgers

== 2011 ==
Round	Pick #	Overall	Name	Position	College
1	12	12	Christian Ponder	Quarterback	Florida State
2	11	43	Kyle Rudolph	Tight end	Notre Dame
4	9	106	Christian Ballard	Defensive tackle	Iowa
5	8	139	Brandon Burton	Cornerback	Utah
6	3	168	DeMarcus Love	Offensive tackle	Arkansas
6	5	170	Mistral Raymond	Safety	South Florida
6	7	172	Brandon Fusco	Center	Slippery Rock
6	35	200	Ross Homan	Linebacker	Ohio State
7	12	215	D'Aundre Reed	Defensive end	Arizona
7	33	236	Stephen Burton	Wide receiver	West Texas A&M

== 2012 ==
Round	Pick #	Overall	Name	Position	College
1	4	4	Matt Kalil	Offensive tackle	USC
1	29	29	Harrison Smith	Safety	Notre Dame
3	3	66	Josh Robinson	Cornerback	Central Florida
4	23	118	Jarius Wright	Wide receiver	Arkansas
4	33	128	Rhett Ellison	Fullback	USC
4	39	134	Greg Childs	Wide receiver	Arkansas
5	4	139	Robert Blanton	Cornerback	Notre Dame
6	5	175	Blair Walsh	Kicker	Georgia
7	3	210	Audie Cole	Linebacker	North Carolina State
7	12	219	Trevor Guyton	Defensive end	California

== 2013 ==
Round	Pick #	Overall	Name	Position	College
1	23	23	Sharrif Floyd	Defensive tackle	Florida
1	25	25	Xavier Rhodes	Cornerback	Florida State
1	29	29	Cordarrelle Patterson	Wide receiver	Tennessee
4	23	120	Gerald Hodges	Linebacker	Penn State
5	22	155	Jeff Locke	Punter	UCLA
6	28	196	Jeff Baca	Guard	UCLA
7	7	213	Michael Mauti	Linebacker	Penn State
7	8	214	Travis Bond	Guard	North Carolina
7	23	229	Everett Dawkins	Defensive tackle	Florida State

== 2014 ==
Round	Pick #	Overall	Name	Position	College
1	9	9	Anthony Barr	Linebacker	UCLA
1	32	32	Teddy Bridgewater	Quarterback	Louisville
3	8	72	Scott Crichton	Defensive end	Oregon State
3	32	96	Jerick McKinnon	Running back	Georgia Southern
5	5	145	David Yankey	Guard	Stanford
6	6	182	Antone Exum	Cornerback	Virginia Tech
6	8	184	Kendall James	Cornerback	Maine
7	5	220	Shamar Stephen	Defensive tackle	Connecticut
7	8	223	Brandon Watts	Linebacker	Georgia Tech
7	10	225	Jabari Price	Cornerback	North Carolina

== 2015 ==
Round	Pick #	Overall	Name	Position	College
1	11	11	Trae Waynes	Cornerback	Michigan State
2	13	45	Eric Kendricks	Linebacker	UCLA
3	24	88	Danielle Hunter	Defensive end	Louisiana State
4	11	110	T. J. Clemmings	Offensive tackle	Pittsburgh
5	7	143	MyCole Pruitt	Tight end	Southern Illinois
5	10	146	Stefon Diggs	Wide receiver	Maryland
6	9	185	Tyrus Thompson	Offensive tackle	Oklahoma
6	17	193	B. J. Dubose	Defensive end	Louisville
7	11	228	Austin Shepherd	Offensive tackle	Alabama
7	15	232	Edmond Robinson	Linebacker	Newberry College

== 2016 ==
Round	Pick #	Overall	Name	Position	College
1	23	23	Laquon Treadwell	Wide receiver	Ole Miss
2	23	54	Mackensie Alexander	Cornerback	Clemson
4	23	121	Willie Beavers	Guard	Western Michigan
5	23	160	Kentrell Brothers	Linebacker	Missouri
6	5	180	Moritz Böhringer	Wide receiver	Schwäbisch Hall (GFL)
6	13	188	David Morgan	Tight end	Texas-San Antonio
7	6	227	Stephen Weatherly	Linebacker	Vanderbilt
7	23	244	Jayron Kearse	Safety	Clemson

== 2017 ==
Round	Pick #	Overall	Name	Position	College
2	9	41	Dalvin Cook	Running back	Florida State
3	6	70	Pat Elflein	Center	Ohio State
4	2	109	Jaleel Johnson	Defensive tackle	Iowa
4	14	120	Ben Gedeon	Linebacker	Michigan
5	27	170	Rodney Adams	Wide receiver	South Florida
5	37	180	Danny Isidora	Guard	Miami
6	17	201	Bucky Hodges	Tight end	Virginia Tech
7	1	219	Stacy Coley	Wide receiver	Miami
7	2	220	Ifeadi Odenigbo	Defensive end	Northwestern
7	14	242	Elijah Lee	Linebacker	Kansas State
7	27	245	Jack Tocho	Cornerback	North Carolina State

== 2018 ==
Round	Pick #	Overall	Name	Position	College
1	30	30	Mike Hughes	Cornerback	Central Florida
2	30	62	Brian O'Neill	Offensive tackle	Pittsburgh
4	2	102	Jalyn Holmes	Defensive end	Ohio State
5	20	157	Tyler Conklin	Tight end	Central Michigan
5	30	167	Daniel Carlson	Kicker	Auburn
6	39	213	Colby Gossett	Guard	Appalachian State
6	44	218	Ade Aruna	Defensive end	Tulane
7	7	225	Devante Downs	Linebacker	California

== 2019 ==
Round	Pick #	Overall	Name	Position	College
1	18	18	Garrett Bradbury	Center	North Carolina State
2	18	50	Irv Smith Jr.	Tight end	Alabama
3	39	102	Alexander Mattison	Running back	Boise State
4	12	114	Dru Samia	Guard	Oklahoma
5	24	162	Cameron Smith	Linebacker	USC
6	18	190	Armon Watts	Defensive tackle	Arkansas
6	19	191	Marcus Epps	Safety	Wyoming
6	21	193	Olisaemeka Udoh	Offensive tackle	Elon
7	3	217	Kris Boyd	Cornerback	Texas
7	25	239	Dillon Mitchell	Wide receiver	Oregon
7	33	247	Olabisi Johnson	Wide receiver	Colorado State
7	36	250	Austin Cutting	Long snapper	Air Force

== 2020 ==
Round	Pick #	Overall	Name	Position	College
1	22	22	Justin Jefferson	Wide receiver	Louisiana State
1	31	31	Jeff Gladney	Cornerback	Texas Christian
2	26	58	Ezra Cleveland	Offensive tackle	Boise State
3	25	89	Cameron Dantzler	Cornerback	Mississippi State
4	11	117	D. J. Wonnum	Defensive end	South Carolina
4	24	130	James Lynch	Defensive tackle	Baylor
4	26	132	Troy Dye	Linebacker	Oregon
5	24	169	Harrison Hand	Cornerback	Temple
5	31	176	K. J. Osborn	Wide receiver	Miami (FL)
6	24	203	Blake Brandel	Offensive tackle	Oregon State
6	26	205	Josh Metellus	Safety	Michigan
7	11	225	Kenny Willekes	Defensive end	Michigan State
7	30	244	Nate Stanley	Quarterback	Iowa
7	35	249	Brian Cole II	Safety	Mississippi State
7	39	253	Kyle Hinton	Guard	Washburn

== 2021 ==
Round	Pick #	Overall	Name	Position	College
1	23	23	Christian Darrisaw	Offensive tackle	Virginia Tech
3	2	66	Kellen Mond	Quarterback	Texas A&M
3	15	78	Chazz Surratt	Linebacker	North Carolina
3	23	86	Wyatt Davis	Guard	Ohio State
3	27	90	Patrick Jones II	Defensive end	Pittsburgh
4	14	119	Kene Nwangwu	Running back	Iowa State
4	20	125	Camryn Bynum	Cornerback	California
4	29	134	Janarius Robinson	Defensive end	Florida State
5	13	157	Ihmir Smith-Marsette	Wide receiver	Iowa
5	24	168	Zach Davidson	Tight end	Central Missouri
6	15	199	Jaylen Twyman	Defensive tackle	Pittsburgh

== 2022 ==
Round	Pick #	Overall	Name	Position	College
1	32	32	Lewis Cine	Safety	Georgia
2	10	42	Andrew Booth Jr.	Cornerback	Clemson
2	27	59	Ed Ingram	Guard	LSU
3	2	66	Brian Asamoah	Linebacker	Oklahoma
4	13	118	Akayleb Evans	Cornerback	Missouri
5	22	165	Esezi Otomewo	Defensive end	Minnesota
5	26	169	Ty Chandler	Running back	North Carolina
6	5	184	Vederian Lowe	Offensive tackle	Illinois
6	12	191	Jalen Nailor	Wide receiver	Michigan State
7	6	227	Nick Muse	Tight end	South Carolina

== 2023 ==
Round	Pick #	Overall	Name	Position	College
1	23	23	Jordan Addison	Wide receiver	USC
3	39	102	Mekhi Blackmon	Cornerback	USC
4	32	134	Jay Ward	Safety	LSU
5	6	141	Jaquelin Roy	Defensive tackle	LSU
5	29	164	Jaren Hall	Quarterback	BYU
7	5	222	DeWayne McBride	Running back	UAB

== 2024 ==
Round	Pick #	Overall	Name	Position	College
1	10	10	J. J. McCarthy	Quarterback	Michigan
1	17	17	Dallas Turner	Defensive end	Alabama
4	8	108	Khyree Jackson	Cornerback	Oregon
6	1	177	Walter Rouse	Offensive tackle	Oklahoma
6	27	203	Will Reichard	Kicker	Alabama
7	10	230	Michael Jurgens	Center	Wake Forest
7	12	232	Levi Drake Rodriguez	Defensive tackle	Texas A&M–Commerce

== 2025 ==
Round	Pick #	Overall	Name	Position	College
1	24	24	Donovan Jackson	Guard	Ohio State
3	38	102	Tai Felton	Wide receiver	Maryland
5	1	139	Tyrion Ingram-Dawkins	Defensive tackle	Georgia
6	25	201	Kobe King	Linebacker	Penn State
6	26	202	Gavin Bartholomew	Tight end	Pittsburgh

== 2026 ==
Round	Pick #	Overall	Name	Position	College
1	18	18	Caleb Banks	Defensive tackle	Florida
2	19	51	Jake Golday	Linebacker	Cincinnati
3	18	82	Domonique Orange	Defensive tackle	Iowa State
3	33	97	Caleb Tiernan	Offensive Tackle	Northwestern
3	34	98	Jakobe Thomas	Safety	Miami (FL)
5	19	159	Max Bredeson	Fullback	Michigan
5	23	163	Charles Demmings	Cornerback	Stephen F. Austin
6	17	198	Demond Claiborne	Running back	Wake Forest
7	19	235	Gavin Gerhardt	Center	Cincinnati
