= 2001 Minnesota Vikings season =

NFL team season

- Owner: Red McCombs
- General manager: Dennis Green
- Head coach: Dennis Green (fired on January 4, 2002, 5–10 record); Mike Tice (interim; 0–1 record)
- Home stadium: Hubert H. Humphrey Metrodome

Results
- Record: 5–11
- Division place: 4th NFC Central
- Playoffs: Did not qualify
- Pro Bowlers: C Matt Birk; TE Byron Chamberlain

Uniform
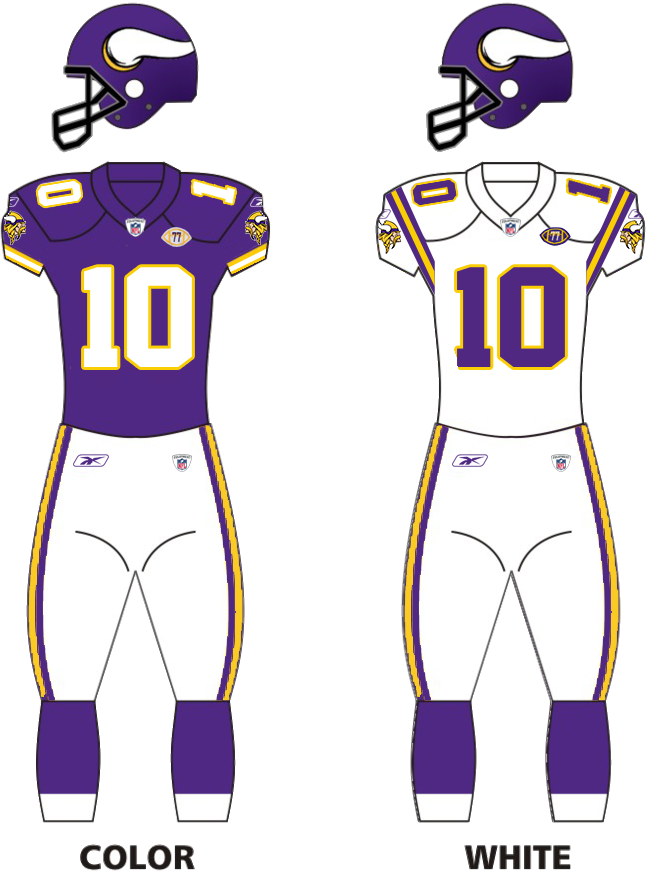

The 2001 season was the Minnesota Vikings' 41st in the National Football League (NFL). Despite having a 12th ranked offense, the Vikings finished 5–11 and missed the playoffs for the first time since 1995. Before the end of the season, the team fired head coach Dennis Green, who had become a polarizing force among the Vikings fan base despite his successful coaching tenure with the team. Mike Tice coached the final game of 2001, a loss to the Baltimore Ravens.

This was the first season since 1989 that defensive tackle John Randle was not on the opening day roster.

The season began in tragic circumstances when offensive tackle Korey Stringer died of heatstroke in training camp.

The season started off with a 24–13 home loss to the Carolina Panthers, which would prove the Panthers' lone win. They did not win on the road at all during this season. Some season highlights included a 35–13 win over the rival Green Bay Packers in Week 6, and a Week 10 victory over the New York Giants in which Randy Moss pulled in 10 receptions for 171 yards and three touchdowns leading to a 28–16 victory.

This was Cris Carter's final season in Minnesota, having played 12 seasons there, making eight consecutive Pro Bowl appearances (1993–2000), all with the Vikings. He is the team's all-time leader in receptions, receiving yards, and touchdowns. He retired at the end of the disappointing season, but would briefly return to play for the Miami Dolphins midway through next season.

== Offseason ==
Additions	Subtractions
WR Jake Reed (Saints)	LB Dwayne Rudd (Browns)
TE Byron Chamberlain (Broncos)	DT John Randle (Seahawks)
DE Lance Johnstone (Raiders)	WR Matthew Hatchette (Jets)
	T Todd Steussie (Panthers)

=== 2001 draft ===
Pro Bowler

2001 Minnesota Vikings draft selections
Round	Selection	Player name	Position	College	Notes
1	27	Michael Bennett	Running back	Wisconsin	
2	57	Willie Howard	Defensive end	Stanford	
3	69	Eric Kelly	Cornerback	Kentucky	From Patriots (Note: The Vikings traded their third- and fourth-round selections (86th and 119th overall) to the Patriots in exchange for a third-round selection (69th overall).)
3	86	Traded to the New England Patriots			
4	119	Traded to the New England Patriots			
4	130	Shawn Worthen	Defensive tackle	TCU	Compensatory pick
4	131	Cedric James	Wide receiver	TCU	Compensatory pick
5	157	Patrick Chukwurah	Linebacker	Wyoming	
6	189	Carey Scott	Cornerback	Kentucky State	
7	225	Brian Crawford	Defensive tackle	Western Oregon	

=== Undrafted free agents ===
2001 undrafted free agents
Player	Position	College
Jeff Hazuga	Defensive End	Wisconsin–Stout
Jeff Kostrewa	Tight end	Wisconsin–La Crosse
Haun Paga	Fullback	California
Brian Russell	Safety	San Diego State
Mike Solwold	Long snapper/Tight end	Wisconsin

== Staff ==
2001 Minnesota Vikings staff
Front office: Owner – Red McCombs; President – Gary Woods; Vice president of football administration – Rob Brzezinski; Head coaches: Head coach/General Manager – Dennis Green; Assistant head coach/defensive backs – Willie Shaw; Assistant head coach/offensive line – Mike Tice; Offensive coaches: Offensive coordinator – Sherman Lewis; Quarterbacks – Alex Wood; Running backs – Carl Hargrave; Wide receivers – Charlie Baggett; Tight ends – John Tice; Assistant offensive line/quality control – Dean Dalton	Defensive coaches: Defensive coordinator – Emmitt Thomas; Defensive line – Brian Baker; Inside linebackers – Richard Solomon; Outside linebackers – Chuck Knox Jr.; Defensive assistant – Trent Walters; Special teams coaches: Special teams coordinator – Gary Zauner; Strength and conditioning: Strength and conditioning – Steve Wetzel; Assistant strength and conditioning – Daryl Lawrence

== Roster ==
2001 Minnesota Vikings roster
Quarterbacks (QB): 8 Todd Bouman; 11 Daunte Culpepper; 7 Romaro Miller; 3 Spergon Wynn; Running backs (RB): 23 Michael Bennett; 34 Doug Chapman; 40 Jim Kleinsasser FB; 33 Harold Morrow FB; 30 Travis Prentice; Wide receivers (WR): 80 Cris Carter; 83 Nate Jacquet; 84 Randy Moss; 86 Jake Reed; 81 Chris Walsh; 82 Troy Walters; Tight ends (TE): 87 Byron Chamberlain; 85 Andrew Jordan	Offensive linemen (OL): 74 Brad Badger T; 78 Matt Birk C; 65 Calvin Collins G; 73 Brian Crawford T; 71 David Dixon G; 61 Lewis Kelly T; 63 Corbin Lacina G; 62 Everett Lindsay G/T; 76 Chris Liwienski T; 60 Cory Withrow C/G; Defensive linemen (DL): 50 Patrick Chukwurah DE; 93 Stalin Colinet DE/DT; 92 Winfield Garnett DT; 99 Chris Hovan DT; 51 Lance Johnstone DE; 98 Fred Robbins DT; 97 Talance Sawyer DE; 95 Shawn Worthen DT	Linebackers (LB): 55 Lemanski Hall OLB; 58 Ed McDaniel OLB; 94 Pete Monty MLB; 56 Jim Nelson OLB; 96 Andre O'Neal OLB; 54 Antonio Wilson OLB; 52 Kailee Wong MLB; Defensive backs (DB): 21 Dale Carter CB; 22 Tyrone Carter FS; 24 Robert Griffith SS; 25 Eric Kelly CB; 31 Don Morgan SS; 28 Robert Tate CB; 42 Orlando Thomas FS; 20 Kenny Wright CB; Special teams (ST): 1 Gary Anderson K; 43 Brody Heffner=Liddiard LS; 12 Lee Johnson P	Practice squad: 48 Matt Cercone TE; 15 Kenny Clark WR; 49 Jeff Kostrewa TE; 69 Mike Malano G; 32 Brian Russell S; Reserve: 17 Mitch Berger P (IR); -- Michael Boireau DE (IR); 90 Jeff Hazuga DE (IR); 91 Willie Howard DE (IR); 89 Cedric James WR (IR); -- Isaac Keys LB (IR); 41 Carey Scott CB (IR); 68 Bennitte Waddell T (IR); 59 Fearon Wright LB (IR); Rookies in italics 53 active, 9 reserve, 5 practice squad

== Preseason ==
=== Schedule ===
Week	Date	Opponent	Result	Record	Venue	Attendance	NFL.com recap
1	August 11	at New Orleans Saints	W 28–21	1–0	Alamodome (San Antonio, TX)	46,752	Recap
2	August 16	Pittsburgh Steelers	W 24–10	2–0	Hubert H. Humphrey Metrodome	63,790	Recap
3	August 24	Indianapolis Colts	W 28–21	3–0	Hubert H. Humphrey Metrodome	63,804	Recap
4	August 31	at Miami Dolphins	W 20–7	4–0	Pro Player Stadium	60,136	Recap

=== Game summaries ===
==== Week 1: at New Orleans Saints ====
Week 1: Minnesota Vikings at New Orleans Saints – Game summary

Quarter	1	2	3	4	Total
Vikings	7	14	0	7	28
Saints	7	0	7	7	21

at Alamodome, San Antonio, Texas

- Date: August 11
- Game time: 7:00 p.m. CDT
- Game weather: None (indoor stadium)
- Game attendance: 46,752
- Referee: Walt Coleman (65)
- Recap, Game Book

Game information

First quarter

- MIN – Randy Moss 60-yard pass from Daunte Culpepper (Gary Anderson kick), 7:36. Vikings 7–0. Drive: 3 plays, 80 yards, 1:38.
- NO – Willie Jackson 23-yard pass from Aaron Brooks (John Carney kick), 2:56. Tied 7–7. Drive: 8 plays, 82 yards, 4:40.

Second quarter

- MIN – Daunte Culpepper 11-yard run (Gary Anderson kick), 12:53. Vikings 14–7. Drive: 12 plays, 84 yards, 5:03.
- MIN – Michael Bennett 1-yard run (Gary Anderson kick), 2:39. Vikings 21–7. Drive: 3 plays, 46 yards, 0:45.

Third quarter

- NO – Deuce McAllister 11-yard pass from Jake Delhomme (Jon Hilbert kick), 2:50. Vikings 21–14. Drive: 12 plays, 70 yards, 5:45.

Fourth quarter

- MIN – Michael Bennett 5-yard run (Andy Crosland kick), 12:53. Vikings 28–14. Drive: 10 plays, 80 yards, 4:57.
- NO – Onomo Ojo 6-yard pass from Jake Delhomme (Jon Hilbert kick), 8:43. Vikings 28–21. Drive: 9 plays, 37 yards, 4:10.

Top passers

- MIN – Todd Bouman – 6/15, 79 yards
- NO – Jake Delhomme – 14/23, 192 yards, 2 TD

Top rushers

- MIN – Michael Bennett – 9 rushes, 79 yards, 2 TD
- NO – James Fenderson – 4 rushes, 14 yards

Top receivers

- MIN – Randy Moss – 1 reception, 60 yards, TD
- NO – Boo Williams – 3 receptions, 111 yards

==== Week 2: vs. Pittsburgh Steelers ====
Week 2: Pittsburgh Steelers at Minnesota Vikings – Game summary

Quarter	1	2	3	4	Total
Steelers	7	0	3	0	10
Vikings	0	17	0	7	24

at Hubert H. Humphrey Metrodome, Minneapolis, Minnesota

- Date: August 16
- Game time: 7:00 p.m. CDT
- Game weather: None (indoor stadium)
- Game attendance: 63,790
- Referee: Bernie Kukar (86)
- Recap, Game Book

Game information

First quarter

- PIT – Kordell Stewart 1-yard run (Kris Brown kick), 3:57. Steelers 7–0. Drive: 12 plays, 89 yards, 7:20.

Second quarter

- MIN – Daunte Culpepper 1-yard run (Gary Anderson kick), 5:10. Tied 7–7. Drive: 17 plays, 84 yards, 9:52.
- MIN – Randy Moss 3-yard pass from Daunte Culpepper (Gary Anderson kick), 1:55. Vikings 14–7. Drive: 2 plays, 57 yards, 0:41.
- MIN – Gary Anderson 39-yard field goal, 0:05. Vikings 17–7. Drive: 6 plays, 11 yards, 0:44.

Third quarter

- PIT – Kris Brown 42-yard field goal, 8:21. Vikings 17–10. Drive: 12 plays, 55 yards, 6:39.

Fourth quarter

- MIN – Lamanzer Williams 21-yard fumble return (Andy Crosland kick), 0:35. Vikings 24–10.

Top passers

- PIT – Kordell Stewart – 6/9, 50 yards, INT
- MIN – Daunte Culpepper – 14/24, 178 yards, TD

Top rushers

- PIT – Amos Zereoué – 7 rushes, 40 yards
- MIN – James Wofford – 7 rushes, 33 yards

Top receivers

- PIT – Chris Fuamatu-Maʻafala – 2 receptions, 29 yards
- MIN – Randy Moss – 4 receptions, 77 yards, TD

==== Week 3: vs. Indianapolis Colts ====
Week 3: Indianapolis Colts at Minnesota Vikings – Game summary

Quarter	1	2	3	4	Total
Colts	10	0	8	3	21
Vikings	0	14	7	7	28

at Hubert H. Humphrey Metrodome, Minneapolis, Minnesota

- Date: August 24
- Game time: 7:00 p.m. CDT
- Game weather: None (indoor stadium)
- Game attendance: 63,804
- Referee: Tom White (123)
- Recap, Game Book

Game information

First quarter

- IND – Jerome Pathon 15-yard pass from Peyton Manning (Mike Vanderjagt kick), 10:59. Colts 7–0. Drive: 7 plays, 78 yards, 4:01.
- IND – Mike Vanderjagt 28-yard field goal, 2:09. Colts 10–0. Drive: 9 plays, 36 yards, 3:47.

Second quarter

- MIN – Michael Bennett 14-yard run (Gary Anderson kick), 9:36. Colts 10–7. Drive: 5 plays, 35 yards, 2:28.
- MIN – Randy Moss 74-yard pass from Daunte Culpepper (Gary Anderson kick), 3:35. Vikings 14–10. Drive: 1 play, 74 yards, 0:14.

Third quarter

- MIN – Randy Moss 54-yard pass from Daunte Culpepper (Gary Anderson kick), 13:04. Vikings 21–10. Drive: 4 plays, 73 yards, 1:56.
- IND – Jim Finn 45-yard pass from Mark Rypien (Brett Millican run), 8:06. Vikings 21–18. Drive: 7 plays, 74 yards, 4:58.

Fourth quarter

- IND – Mike Vanderjagt 43-yard field goal, 14:50. Tied 21–21. Drive: 4 plays, 3 yards, 1:21.
- MIN – Nate Jacquet 76-yard punt return (Andy Crosland kick), 11:14. Viking 28–21.

Top passers

- IND – Peyton Manning – 18/30, 208 yards, TD, 2 INT
- MIN – Daunte Culpepper – 9/15, 172 yards, 2 TD

Top rushers

- IND – Edgerrin James – 11 rushes, 44 yards
- MIN – Michael Bennett – 6 rushes, 33 yards, TD

Top receivers

- IND – Trevor Insley – 6 receptions, 66 yards
- MIN – Randy Moss – 2 receptions, 128 yards, 2 TD

==== Week 4: at Miami Dolphins ====
Week 4: Minnesota Vikings at Miami Dolphins – Game summary

Quarter	1	2	3	4	Total
Vikings	0	10	3	7	20
Dolphins	0	7	0	0	7

at Pro Player Stadium, Miami, Florida

- Date: August 31
- Game time: 7:00 p.m. EDT/6:00 p.m. CDT
- Game weather: Partly cloudy, 87 °F (31 °C)
- Game attendance: 60,136
- Referee: Perry Havener (61)
- Recap, Game Book

Game information

First quarter

- No scoring plays.

Second quarter

- MIA – Ray Lucas 1-yard run (Olindo Mare kick), 14:09. Dolphins 7–0. Drive: 5 plays, 26 yards, 2:28.
- MIN – Randy Moss 6-yard pass from Daunte Culpepper (Gary Anderson kick), 10:00. Tied 7–7. Drive: 9 plays, 67 yards, 4:09.
- MIN – Gary Anderson 36-yard field goal, 0:00. Vikings 10–7. Drive: 8 plays, 30 yards, 2:04.

Third quarter

- MIN – Gary Anderson 43-yard field goal, 0:03. Vikings 13–7. Drive: 5 plays, 5 yards, 1:28.

Fourth quarter

- MIN – Doug Chapman 1-yard run (Gary Anderson kick), 8:29. Vikings 20–7. Drive: 11 plays, 59 yards, 6:23.

Top passers

- MIN – Daunte Culpepper – 7/15, 96 yards, TD, 2 INT
- MIA – Jay Fiedler – 5/7, 50 yards

Top rushers

- MIN – Daunte Culpepper – 4 rushes, 55 yards
- MIA – Travis Minor – 8 rushes, 46 yards

Top receivers

- MIN – Cris Carter – 1 reception, 35 yards
- MIA – James McKnight – 2 receptions, 23 yards

== Regular season ==
=== Schedule ===
Week	Date	Opponent	Result	Record	Venue	Attendance	Game recap
1	September 9	Carolina Panthers	**L** 13–24	0–1	Hubert H. Humphrey Metrodome	64,108	Recap
2 (Note: The Vikings were originally scheduled to play the Baltimore Ravens during Week 2 of the original NFL schedule (September 17) at PSINet Stadium in Baltimore. However, due to the September 11 attacks, the game was rescheduled to Week 17.)	September 23	at **Chicago Bears**	**L** 10–17	0–2	Soldier Field	66,944	Recap
3	September 30	**Tampa Bay Buccaneers**	**W** 20–16	1–2	Hubert H. Humphrey Metrodome	64,105	Recap
4	October 7	at New Orleans Saints	**L** 15–28	1–3	Louisiana Superdome	70,020	Recap
5	October 14	**Detroit Lions**	**W** 31–26	2–3	Hubert H. Humphrey Metrodome	64,048	Recap
6	October 21	**Green Bay Packers**	**W** 35–13	3–3	Hubert H. Humphrey Metrodome	64,165	Recap
7	October 28	at **Tampa Bay Buccaneers**	**L** 14–41	3–4	Raymond James Stadium	65,558	Recap
8	Bye week						
9	November 11	at Philadelphia Eagles	**L** 17–48	3–5	Veterans Stadium	65,638	Recap
10	November 19	New York Giants	**W** 28–16	4–5	Hubert H. Humphrey Metrodome	64,283	Recap
11	November 25	**Chicago Bears**	**L** 6–13	4–6	Hubert H. Humphrey Metrodome	64,214	Recap
12	December 2	at Pittsburgh Steelers	**L** 16–21	4–7	Heinz Field	62,661	Recap
13	December 9	Tennessee Titans	**W** 42–24	5–7	Hubert H. Humphrey Metrodome	64,271	Recap
14	December 16	at **Detroit Lions**	**L** 24–27	5–8	Pontiac Silverdome	72,190	Recap
15	December 23	Jacksonville Jaguars	**L** 3–33	5–9	Hubert H. Humphrey Metrodome	64,150	Recap
16	December 30	at **Green Bay Packers**	**L** 13–24	5–10	Lambeau Field	59,870	Recap
17	January 7	at Baltimore Ravens	**L** 3–19	5–11	PSINet Stadium	69,465	Recap

Notes

- Intradivision opponents are in **bold** text.

=== Game summaries ===
==== Week 1: vs. Carolina Panthers ====
Week 1: Carolina Panthers at Minnesota Vikings – Game summary

Quarter	1	2	3	4	Total
**Panthers**	7	3	7	7	**24**
Vikings	0	0	13	0	**13**

at Hubert H. Humphrey Metrodome, Minneapolis, Minnesota

- Date: September 9
- Game time: 12:00 p.m. CDT
- Game weather: None (indoor stadium)
- Game attendance: 64,108
- Referee: Wayne McKreight (166)
- TV announcers (Fox): Ray Bentley, Jeff Lageman, and Mike Goldberg
- Recap, Game Book

Game information

**First quarter**

- CAR – Steve Smith Sr. 93-yard kickoff return (John Kasay kick), 14:43. Panthers 7–0.

**Second quarter**

- CAR – John Kasay 23-yard field goal, 11:43. Panthers 10–0. **Drive: 7 plays, 41 yards, 3:34.**

**Third quarter**

- MIN – Daunte Culpepper 7-yard run (Gary Anderson kick), 9:09. Panthers 10–7. **Drive: 6 plays, 51 yards, 3:09.**
- MIN – Cris Carter 12-yard pass from Daunte Culpepper (kick blocked), 6:05. Vikings 13–10. **Drive: 5 plays, 49 yards, 2:03.**
- CAR – Muhsin Muhammad 16-yard pass from Chris Weinke (John Kasay kick), 2:53. Panthers 17–13. **Drive: 7 plays, 80 yards, 3:12.**

**Fourth quarter**

- CAR – Chris Weinke 1-yard run (John Kasay kick), 9:52. Panthers 24–13. **Drive: 7 plays, 34 yards, 3:45.**

**Top passers**

- CAR – Chris Weinke – 13/22, 223 yards, TD, INT
- MIN – Daunte Culpepper – 22/38, 236 yards, TD, 3 INT

**Top rushers**

- CAR – Nick Goings – 25 rushes, 86 yards
- MIN – Daunte Culpepper – 12 rushes, 57 yards, TD

**Top receivers**

- CAR – Wesley Walls – 3 receptions, 74 yards
- MIN – Byron Chamberlain – 7 receptions, 83 yards

==== Week 2: at Chicago Bears ====
Week 2: Minnesota Vikings at Chicago Bears – Game summary

Quarter	1	2	3	4	Total
Vikings	3	0	7	0	**10**
**Bears**	0	0	3	14	**17**

at Soldier Field, Chicago, Illinois

- Date: September 23
- Game time: 12:00 p.m. CDT
- Game weather: Cloudy, fog, 63 °F (17 °C)
- Game attendance: 66,944
- Referee: Mike Carey (94)
- Recap, Game Book

Game information

**First quarter**

- MIN – Gary Anderson 20-yard field goal, 6:05. Vikings 3–0. **Drive: 6 plays, 44 yards, 3:32.**

**Second quarter**

- No scoring plays.

**Third quarter**

- MIN – Andrew Jordan 3-yard pass from Daunte Culpepper (Gary Anderson kick), 10:34. Vikings 10–0. **Drive: 8 plays, 61 yards, 4:26.**
- CHI – Paul Edinger 45-yard field goal, 6:15. Vikings 10–3. **Drive: 9 plays, 45 yards, 4:19.**

**Fourth quarter**

- CHI – Marty Booker 15-yard pass from Jim Miller (Paul Edinger kick), 9:29. Tied 10–10. **Drive: 7 plays, 54 yards, 3:29.**
- CHI – Marcus Robinson 24-yard pass from Jim Miller (Paul Edinger kick), 3:39. Bears 17–10. **Drive: 5 plays, 45 yards, 2:52.**

**Top passers**

- MIN – Daunte Culpepper – 24/36, 233 yards, TD
- CHI – Jim Miller – 18/29, 204 yards, 2 TD, INT

**Top rushers**

- MIN – Michael Bennett – 16 rushes, 56 yards
- CHI – James Allen – 15 rushes, 45 yards

**Top receivers**

- MIN – Randy Moss – 5 receptions, 81 yards
- CHI – Marcus Robinson – 7 receptions, 99 yards, TD

==== Week 3: vs. Tampa Bay Buccaneers ====
Week 3: Tampa Bay Buccaneers at Minnesota Vikings – Game summary

Quarter	1	2	3	4	Total
Buccaneers	3	3	3	7	**16**
**Vikings**	7	3	3	7	**20**

at Hubert H. Humphrey Metrodome, Minneapolis, Minnesota

- Date: September 30
- Game time: 12:00 p.m. CDT
- Game weather: None (indoor stadium)
- Game attendance: 64,105
- Referee: Ed Hochuli (85)
- TV announcers (Fox): Pat Summerall and John Madden
- Recap, Game Book

Game information

**First quarter**

- TB – Martín Gramática 25-yard field goal, 7:39. Buccaneers 3–0. **Drive: 10 plays, 47 yards, 4:14.**
- MIN – Cris Carter 13-yard pass from Daunte Culpepper (Gary Anderson kick), 0:44. Vikings 7–3. **Drive: 11 plays, 80 yards, 6:55.**

**Second quarter**

- MIN – Gary Anderson 24-yard field goal, 2:55. Vikings 10–3. **Drive: 18 plays, 74 yards, 10:33.**
- TB – Martín Gramática 25-yard field goal, 0:16. Vikings 10–6. **Drive: 8 plays, 65 yards, 2:39.**

**Third quarter**

- TB – Martín Gramática 49-yard field goal, 6:57. Vikings 10–9. **Drive: 10 plays, 53 yards, 4:50.**
- MIN – Gary Anderson 29-yard field goal, 1:44. Vikings 13–9. **Drive: 12 plays, 69 yards, 5:13.**

**Fourth quarter**

- TB – Warrick Dunn 6-yard run (Martín Gramática kick), 12:40. Buccaneers 16–13. **Drive: 8 plays, 75 yards, 4:04.**
- MIN – Daunte Culpepper 8-yard run (Gary Anderson kick), 1:03. Vikings 20–16. **Drive: 11 plays, 96 yards, 5:18.**

**Top passers**

- TB – Brad Johnson – 20/34, 224 yards, INT
- MIN – Daunte Culpepper – 30/44, 322 yards, TD, 2 INT

**Top rushers**

- TB – Warrick Dunn – 11 rushes, 65 yards, TD
- MIN – Michael Bennett – 13 rushes, 51 yards

**Top receivers**

- TB – Keyshawn Johnson – 7 receptions, 96 yards
- MIN – Byron Chamberlain – 4 receptions, 88 yards

==== Week 4: at New Orleans Saints ====
Week 4: Minnesota Vikings at New Orleans Saints – Game summary

Quarter	1	2	3	4	Total
Vikings	7	0	8	0	**15**
**Saints**	6	9	10	3	**28**

at Louisiana Superdome, New Orleans, Louisiana

- Date: October 7
- Game time: 12:00 p.m. CDT
- Game weather: None (indoor stadium)
- Game attendance: 70,020
- Referee: Bill Leavy (127)
- TV announcers (Fox): Dick Stockton, Troy Aikman and Daryl Johnston
- Recap, Game Book

Game information

**First quarter**

- NO – John Carney 50-yard field goal, 10:27. Saints 3–0. **Drive: 6 plays, 23 yards, 2:36.**
- NO – John Carney 23-yard field goal, 4:56. Saints 6–0. **Drive: 10 plays, 50 yards, 3:55.**
- MIN – Randy Moss 29-yard pass from Daunte Culpepper (Gary Anderson kick), 0:19. Vikings 7–6. **Drive: 4 plays, 80 yards, 2:16.**

**Second quarter**

- NO – Ricky Williams 1-yard run (run failed), 7:50. Saints 12–7. **Drive: 15 plays, 74 yards, 7:29.**
- NO – John Carney 45-yard field goal, 4:29. Saints 15–7. **Drive: 5 plays, 19 yards, 2:06.**

**Third quarter**

- NO – John Carney 29-yard field goal, 10:01. Saints 18–7. **Drive: 9 plays, 60 yards, 4:59.**
- NO – Chris Oldham 38-yard fumble return (John Carney kick), 5:38. Saints 25–7.
- MIN – Byron Chamberlain 19-yard pass from Daunte Culpepper (Daunte Culpepper run), 0:14. Saints 25–15. **Drive: 11 plays, 80 yards, 5:24.**

**Fourth quarter**

- NO – John Carney 33-yard field goal, 8:37. Saints 28–15. **Drive: 10 plays, 59 yards, 6:37.**

**Top passers**

- MIN – Daunte Culpepper – 23/34, 332 yards, 2 TD, INT
- NO – Aaron Brooks – 15/30, 210 yards, INT

**Top rushers**

- MIN – Michael Bennett – 8 rushes, 24 yards
- NO – Ricky Williams – 30 rushes, 136 yards, TD

**Top receivers**

- MIN – Cris Carter – 4 receptions, 84 yards
- NO – Willie Jackson – 6 receptions, 95 yards

==== Week 5: vs. Detroit Lions ====
Week 5: Detroit Lions at Minnesota Vikings – Game summary

Quarter	1	2	3	4	Total
Lions	3	3	7	13	**26**
**Vikings**	7	17	7	0	**31**

at Hubert H. Humphrey Metrodome, Minneapolis, Minnesota

- Date: October 14
- Game time: 12:00 p.m. CDT
- Game weather: None (indoor stadium)
- Game attendance: 64,048
- Referee: Tony Corrente (99)
- Recap, Game Book

Game information

**First quarter**

- MIN – Daunte Culpepper 7-yard run (Gary Anderson kick), 8:29. Vikings 7–0. **Drive: 10 plays, 80 yards, 6:31.**
- DET – Jason Hanson 19-yard field goal, 3:59. Vikings 7–3. **Drive: 9 plays, 75 yards, 4:30.**

**Second quarter**

- MIN – Travis Prentice 1-yard run (Gary Anderson kick), 14:46. Vikings 14–3. **Drive: 9 plays, 55 yards, 4:13.**
- MIN – Gary Anderson 41-yard field goal, 10:42. Vikings 17–3. **Drive: 7 plays, 14 yards, 2:34.**
- DET – Jason Hanson 51-yard field goal, 7:23. Vikings 17–6. **Drive: 7 plays, 29 yards, 3:19.**
- MIN – Daunte Culpepper 33-yard run (Gary Anderson kick), 0:25. Vikings 24–6. **Drive: 5 plays, 61 yards, 0:34.**

**Third quarter**

- MIN – Cris Carter 47-yard pass from Daunte Culpepper (Gary Anderson kick), 10:25. Vikings 31–6. **Drive: 3 plays, 80 yards, 1:12.**
- DET – James "Little Man" Stewart 15-yard pass from Charlie Batch (Jason Hanson kick), 5:40. Vikings 31–13. **Drive: 8 plays, 74 yards, 4:45.**

**Fourth quarter**

- DET – Germane Crowell 16-yard pass from Charlie Batch (pass failed), 14:20. Vikings 31–19. **Drive: 6 plays, 59 yards, 2:23.**
- DET – Johnnie Morton 20-yard pass from Charlie Batch (Jason Hanson kick), 6:18. Vikings 31–26. **Drive: 12 plays, 93 yards, 4:01.**

**Top passers**

- DET – Charlie Batch – 31/41, 345 yards, 3 TD
- MIN – Daunte Culpepper – 20/27, 244 yards, TD, INT

**Top rushers**

- DET – James "Little Man" Stewart – 16 rushes, 108 yards
- MIN – Daunte Culpepper – 7 rushes, 83 yards, 2 TD

**Top receivers**

- DET – Germane Crowell – 9 receptions, 125 yards, TD
- MIN – Cris Carter – 8 receptions, 111 yards

==== Week 6: vs. Green Bay Packers ====
Week 6: Green Bay Packers at Minnesota Vikings – Game summary

Quarter	1	2	3	4	Total
Packers	0	0	7	6	**13**
**Vikings**	0	20	0	15	**35**

at Hubert H. Humphrey Metrodome, Minneapolis, Minnesota

- Date: October 21
- Game time: 3:15 p.m. CDT
- Game weather: None (indoor stadium)
- Game attendance: 64,165
- Referee: Ron Winter (14)
- TV announcers (FOX): Pat Summerall and John Madden
- Recap, Game Book

Game information

**First quarter**

- No scoring plays.

**Second quarter**

- MIN – Cris Carter 43-yard pass from Daunte Culpepper (Gary Anderson kick), 8:18. Vikings 7–0. **Drive: 6 plays, 68 yards, 3:47.**
- MIN – Kailee Wong 27-yard interception return (Gary Anderson kick), 7:56. Vikings 14–0.
- MIN – Gary Anderson 42-yard field goal, 3:29. Vikings 17–0. **Drive: 7 plays, 22 yards, 3:31.**
- MIN – Gary Anderson 36-yard field goal, 0:04. Vikings 20–0. **Drive: 7 plays, 62 yards, 1:30.**

**Third quarter**

- GB – Bubba Franks 2-yard pass from Brett Favre (Ryan Longwell kick), 10:20. Vikings 20–7. **Drive: 8 plays, 73 yards, 4:40.**

**Fourth quarter**

- MIN – Daunte Culpepper 14-yard run (Daunte Culpepper–Jake Reed pass), 14:07. Vikings 28–7. **Drive: 11 plays, 63 yards, 6:33.**
- MIN – Jim Kleinsasser 2-yard run (Gary Anderson kick), 2:47. Vikings 35–7. **Drive: 14 plays, 73 yards, 9:34.**
- GB – Charles Lee 3-yard pass from Brett Favre (pass failed), 0:45. Vikings 35–13. **Drive: 8 plays, 69 yards, 2:02.**

**Top passers**

- GB – Brett Favre – 21/35, 169 yards, 2 TD, INT
- MIN – Daunte Culpepper – 18/27, 184 yards, TD

**Top rushers**

- GB – Ahman Green – 11 rushes, 73 yards
- MIN – Doug Chapman – 22 rushes, 90 yards

**Top receivers**

- GB – Antonio Freeman – 5 receptions, 57 yards
- MIN – Randy Moss – 8 receptions, 73 yards

==== Week 7: at Tampa Bay Buccaneers ====
Week 7: Minnesota Vikings at Tampa Bay Buccaneers – Game summary

Quarter	1	2	3	4	Total
Vikings	0	0	8	6	**14**
**Buccaneers**	7	21	13	0	**41**

at Raymond James Stadium, Tampa, Florida

- Date: October 28
- Game time: 12:00 p.m. CDT
- Game weather: Clear, 67 °F (19 °C)
- Game attendance: 65,558
- Referee: Gerald Austin (34)
- Recap, Game Book

Game information

**First quarter**

- TB – Mike Alstott 3-yard run (Martín Gramática kick), 1:35. Buccaneers 7–0. **Drive: 15 plays, 80 yards, 8:23.**

**Second quarter**

- TB – Mike Alstott 6-yard run (Martín Gramática kick), 9:00. Buccaneers 14–0. **Drive: 9 plays, 66 yards, 5:41.**
- TB – Aaron Stecker 35-yard pass from Brad Johnson (Martín Gramática kick), 3:34. Buccaneers 21–0. **Drive: 6 plays, 55 yards, 3:05.**
- TB – Dave Moore 5-yard pass from Brad Johnson (Martín Gramática kick), 0:13. Buccaneers 28–0. **Drive: 10 plays, 74 yards, 2:00.**

**Third quarter**

- TB – Martín Gramática 44-yard field goal, 12:18. Buccaneers 31–0. **Drive: 4 plays, −1 yard, 1:51.**
- TB – Martín Gramática 48-yard field goal, 10:05. Buccaneers 34–0. **Drive: 4 plays, 7 yards, 1:23.**
- MIN – Travis Prentice 1-yard run (Daunte Culpepper run), 6:28. Buccaneers 34–8. **Drive: 7 plays, 83 yards, 3:37.**
- TB – Mike Alstott 10-yard run (Martín Gramática kick), 2:18. Buccaneers 41–8. **Drive: 6 plays, 56 yards, 4:10.**

**Fourth quarter**

- MIN – Randy Moss 25-yard pass from Daunte Culpepper (pass failed), 5:58. Buccaneers 41–14. **Drive: 10 plays, 62 yards, 4:22.**

**Top passers**

- MIN – Daunte Culpepper – 13/24, 150 yards, TD, INT
- TB – Brad Johnson – 18/25, 214 yards, 2 TD

**Top rushers**

- MIN – Daunte Culpepper – 9 rushes, 49 yards
- TB – Mike Alstott – 28 rushes, 129 yards, 3 TD

**Top receivers**

- MIN – Cris Carter – 4 receptions, 55 yards
- TB – Karl Williams – 4 receptions, 80 yards

==== Week 9: at Philadelphia Eagles ====
Week 9: Minnesota Vikings at Philadelphia Eagles – Game summary

Quarter	1	2	3	4	Total
Vikings	0	10	0	7	**17**
**Eagles**	7	24	7	10	**48**

at Veterans Stadium, Philadelphia, Pennsylvania

- Date: November 11
- Game time: 4:15 p.m. CDT
- Game weather: Clear, 50 °F (10 °C)
- Game attendance: 65,638
- Referee: Ron Blum (7)
- Recap, Game Book

Game information

**First quarter**

- PHI – James Thrash 14-yard pass from Donovan McNabb (David Akers kick), 9:38. Eagles 7–0. **Drive: 5 plays, 45 yards, 2:04.**

**Second quarter**

- PHI – Donovan McNabb 12-yard run (David Akers kick), 14:53. Eagles 14–0. **Drive: 10 plays, 91 yards, 5:53.**
- MIN – Gary Anderson 43-yard field goal, 9:02. Eagles 14–3. **Drive: 4 plays, −2 yards, 1:12.**
- PHI – David Akers 36-yard field goal, 6:10. Eagles 17–3. **Drive: 8 plays, 34 yards, 2:52.**
- PHI – James Thrash 17-yard pass from Donovan McNabb (David Akers kick), 4:28. Eagles 24–3. **Drive: 2 plays, 18 yards, 0:42.**
- PHI – Correll Buckhalter 1-yard run (David Akers kick), 2:20. Eagles 31–3. **Drive: 4 plays, 49 yards, 1:51.**
- MIN – Cris Carter 5-yard pass from Daunte Culpepper (Gary Anderson kick), 0:02. Eagles 31–10. **Drive: 11 plays, 75 yards, 2:18.**

**Third quarter**

- PHI – Duce Staley 44-yard run (David Akers kick), 13:04. Eagles 38–10. **Drive: 2 plays, 61 yards, 0:51.**

**Fourth quarter**

- PHI – David Akers 21-yard field goal, 12:30. Eagles 41–10. **Drive: 12 plays, 77 yards, 6:01.**
- PHI – Mike Bartrum 4-yard pass from Donovan McNabb (David Akers kick), 9:30. Eagles 48–10. **Drive: 4 plays, 26 yards, 2:01.**
- MIN – Randy Moss 29-yard pass from Daunte Culpepper (Gary Anderson kick), 5:51. Eagles 48–17. **Drive: 7 plays, 57 yards, 3:39.**

**Top passers**

- MIN – Daunte Culpepper – 21/35, 285 yards, 2 TD, INT
- PHI – Donovan McNabb – 19/29, 223 yards, 3 TD

**Top rushers**

- MIN – Daunte Culpepper – 6 rushes, 21 yards
- PHI – Duce Staley – 17 rushes, 146 yards, TD

**Top receivers**

- MIN – Randy Moss – 7 receptions, 95 yards, TD
- PHI – Duce Staley – 6 receptions, 85 yards

==== Week 10: vs. New York Giants ====
Week 10: New York Giants at Minnesota Vikings – Game summary

Quarter	1	2	3	4	Total
Giants	10	3	3	0	**16**
**Vikings**	7	7	0	14	**28**

at Hubert H. Humphrey Metrodome, Minneapolis, Minnesota

- Date: November 19
- Game time: 8:10 p.m. CDT
- Game weather: None (indoor stadium)
- Game attendance: 64,283
- Referee: Bob McElwee (95)
- Recap, Game Book

Game information

**First quarter**

- MIN – Randy Moss 28-yard pass from Daunte Culpepper (Gary Anderson kick), 12:31. Vikings 7–0. **Drive: 4 plays, 76 yards, 2:29.**
- NYG – Morten Andersen 43-yard field goal, 6:46. Vikings 7–3. **Drive: 12 plays, 56 yards, 5:45.**
- NYG – Tiki Barber 1-yard run (Morten Andersen kick), 0:04. Giants 10–7. **Drive: 6 plays, 41 yards, 2:36.**

**Second quarter**

- MIN – Randy Moss 25-yard pass from Daunte Culpepper (Gary Anderson kick), 3:54. Vikings 14–10. **Drive: 8 plays, 74 yards, 3:59.**
- NYG – Morten Andersen 36-yard field goal, 1:05. Vikings 14–13. **Drive: 8 plays, 45 yards, 2:49.**

**Third quarter**

- NYG – Morten Andersen 51-yard field goal, 11:28. Giants 16–14. **Drive: 7 plays, 52 yards, 3:32.**

**Fourth quarter**

- MIN – Cris Carter 1-yard pass from Daunte Culpepper (Gary Anderson kick), 9:03. Vikings 21–16. **Drive: 14 plays, 62 yards, 8:54.**
- MIN – Randy Moss 57-yard pass from Daunte Culpepper (Gary Anderson kick), 6:32. Vikings 28–16. **Drive: 3 plays, 52 yards, 1:23.**

**Top passers**

- NYG – Kerry Collins – 21/37, 321 yards, 2 INT
- MIN – Daunte Culpepper – 26/38, 277 yards, 4 TD, 2 INT

**Top rushers**

- NYG – Tiki Barber – 8 rushes, 55 yards, TD
- MIN – Michael Bennett – 11 rushes, 33 yards

**Top receivers**

- NYG – Ike Hilliard – 6 receptions, 106 yards
- MIN – Randy Moss – 10 receptions, 171 yards, 3 TD

==== Week 11: vs. Chicago Bears ====
Week 11: Chicago Bears at Minnesota Vikings – Game summary

Quarter	1	2	3	4	Total
**Bears**	0	10	0	3	**13**
Vikings	0	0	3	3	**6**

at Hubert H. Humphrey Metrodome, Minneapolis, Minnesota

- Date: November 25
- Game time: 7:35 p.m. CDT
- Game weather: None (indoor stadium)
- Game attendance: 64,214
- Referee: Johnny Grier (23)
- Recap, Game Book

Game information

**First quarter**

- No scoring plays.

**Second quarter**

- CHI – Leon Johnson 1-yard run (Paul Edinger kick), 9:43. Bears 7–0. **Drive: 8 plays, 80 yards, 4:14.**
- CHI – Paul Edinger 30-yard field goal, 0:44. Bears 10–0. **Drive: 5 plays, 22 yards, 0:54.**

**Third quarter**

- MIN – Gary Anderson 44-yard field goal, 7:52. Bears 10–3. **Drive: 10 plays, 43 yards, 5:13.**

**Fourth quarter**

- CHI – Paul Edinger 43-yard field goal, 13:29. Bears 13–3. **Drive: 8 plays, 55 yards, 2:49.**
- MIN – Gary Anderson 21-yard field goal, 3:17. Bears 13–6. **Drive: 13 plays, 61 yards, 6:37.**

**Top passers**

- CHI – Jim Miller – 10/21, 97 yards
- MIN – Daunte Culpepper – 26/46, 209 yards, INT

**Top rushers**

- CHI – James Allen – 27 rushes, 107 yards
- MIN – Michael Bennett – 12 rushes, 75 yards

**Top receivers**

- CHI – David Terrell – 2 receptions, 51 yards
- MIN – Byron Chamberlain – 7 receptions, 56 yards

==== Week 12: at Pittsburgh Steelers ====
Week 12: Minnesota Vikings at Pittsburgh Steelers – Game summary

Quarter	1	2	3	4	Total
Vikings	3	0	0	13	**16**
**Steelers**	0	7	14	0	**21**

at Heinz Field, Pittsburgh, Pennsylvania

- Date: December 2
- Game time: 12:00 p.m. CDT
- Game weather: Mostly sunny, 46 °F (8 °C)
- Game attendance: 62,661
- Referee: Tony Corrente (99)
- Recap, Game Book

Game information

**First quarter**

- MIN – Gary Anderson 25-yard field goal, 1:28. Vikings 3–0. **Drive: 9 plays, 46 yards, 4:16.**

**Second quarter**

- PIT – Jerome Bettis 1-yard run (Kris Brown kick), 10:26. Steelers 7–3. **Drive: 10 plays, 68 yards, 6:02.**

**Third quarter**

- PIT – Troy Edwards 12-yard run (Kris Brown kick), 7:04. Steelers 14–3. **Drive: 9 plays, 61 yards, 5:47.**
- PIT – Amos Zereoué 4-yard run (Kris Brown kick), 0:44. Steelers 21–3. **Drive: 10 plays, 47 yards, 6:06.**

**Fourth quarter**

- MIN – Michael Bennett 80-yard pass from Todd Bouman (Gary Anderson kick), 6:29. Steelers 21–10. **Drive: 1 play, 80 yards, 0:15.**
- MIN – Randy Moss 12-yard pass from Todd Bouman (pass failed), 3:22. Steelers 21–16. **Drive: 4 plays, 74 yards, 0:57.**

**Top passers**

- MIN – Todd Bouman – 11/15, 200 yards, 2 TD, INT
- PIT – Kordell Stewart – 13/19, 157 yards, INT

**Top rushers**

- MIN – Michael Bennett – 13 rushes, 34 yards
- PIT – Jerome Bettis – 19 rushes, 81 yards, TD

**Top receivers**

- MIN – Randy Moss – 8 receptions, 144 yards, TD
- PIT – Plaxico Burress – 6 receptions, 86 yards

==== Week 13: vs. Tennessee Titans ====
Week 13: Tennessee Titans at Minnesota Vikings – Game summary

Quarter	1	2	3	4	Total
Titans	10	0	0	14	**24**
**Vikings**	0	14	14	14	**42**

at Hubert H. Humphrey Metrodome, Minneapolis, Minnesota

- Date: December 9
- Game time: 12:00 p.m. CDT
- Game weather: None (indoor stadium)
- Game attendance: 64,271
- Referee: Tom White (123)
- Recap, Game Book

Game information

**First quarter**

- TEN – Eddie George 13-yard run (Joe Nedney kick), 8:06. Titans 7–0. **Drive: 11 plays, 74 yards, 6:54.**
- TEN – Joe Nedney 37-yard field goal, 1:10. Titans 10–0. **Drive: 10 plays, 59 yards, 5:52.**

**Second quarter**

- MIN – Byron Chamberlain 6-yard pass from Todd Bouman (Gary Anderson kick), 7:40. Titans 10–7. **Drive: 6 plays, 54 yards, 2:54.**
- MIN – Jake Reed 20-yard pass from Todd Bouman (Gary Anderson kick), 0:40. Vikings 14–10. **Drive: 10 plays, 75 yards, 3:29.**

**Third quarter**

- MIN – Michael Bennett 31-yard run (Gary Anderson kick), 12:36. Vikings 21–10. **Drive: 4 plays, 57 yards, 2:24.**
- MIN – Doug Chapman 38-yard pass from Todd Bouman (Gary Anderson kick), 10:29. Vikings 28–10. **Drive: 1 play, 38 yards, 0:11.**

**Fourth quarter**

- TEN – Derrick Mason 15-yard pass from Steve McNair (Joe Nedney kick), 14:07. Vikings 28–17. **Drive: 9 plays, 80 yards, 3:50.**
- MIN – Michael Bennett 10-yard run (Gary Anderson kick), 7:53. Vikings 35–17. **Drive: 10 plays, 87 yards, 6:14.**
- TEN – Frank Wycheck 9-yard pass from Steve McNair (Joe Nedney kick), 2:57. Vikings 35–24. **Drive: 12 plays, 80 yards, 3:22.**
- MIN – Randy Moss 73-yard pass from Todd Bouman (Gary Anderson kick), 2:35. Vikings 42–24. **Drive: 2 plays, 72 yards, 0:22.**

**Top passers**

- TEN – Steve McNair – 25/33, 302 yards, 2 TD
- MIN – Todd Bouman – 21/31, 348 yards, 4 TD, INT

**Top rushers**

- TEN – Eddie George – 21 rushes, 96 yards, TD
- MIN – Michael Bennett – 16 rushes, 113 yards, 2 TD

**Top receivers**

- TEN – Drew Bennett – 4 receptions, 87 yards
- MIN – Randy Moss – 7 receptions, 158 yards, TD

==== Week 14: at Detroit Lions ====
Week 14: Minnesota Vikings at Detroit Lions – Game summary

Quarter	1	2	3	4	Total
Vikings	7	0	17	0	**24**
**Lions**	14	6	0	7	**27**

at Pontiac Silverdome, Pontiac, Michigan

- Date: December 16
- Game time: 12:00 p.m. CDT
- Game weather: None (indoor stadium)
- Game attendance: 72,190
- Referee: Ed Hochuli (85)
- TV announcers (FOX): Kenny Albert, Tim Green and Jennifer Hammond
- Recap, Game Book

Game information

**First quarter**

- DET – Todd Lyght 59-yard interception return (Jason Hanson kick), 6:18. Lions 7–0.
- MIN – Tyrone Carter 46-yard fumble return (Gary Anderson kick), 2:11. Tied 7–7.
- DET – Mike McMahon 1-yard run (Jason Hanson kick), 0:55. Lions 14–7. **Drive: 4 plays, 71 yards, 1:16.**

**Second quarter**

- DET – Jason Hanson 44-yard field goal, 9:06. Lions 17–7. **Drive: 4 plays, 4 yards, 1:30.**
- DET – Jason Hanson 36-yard field goal, 0:00. Lions 20–7. **Drive: 10 plays, 57 yards, 2:48.**

**Third quarter**

- MIN – Gary Anderson 27-yard field goal, 12:23. Lions 20–10. **Drive: 6 plays, 24 yards, 2:37.**
- MIN – Randy Moss 66-yard pass from Todd Bouman (Gary Anderson kick), 7:12. Lions 20–17. **Drive: 4 plays, 90 yards, 2:42.**
- MIN – Randy Moss 13-yard pass from Todd Bouman (Gary Anderson kick), 1:51. Vikings 24–20. **Drive: 8 plays, 68 yards, 3:39.**

**Fourth quarter**

- DET – Cory Schlesinger 1-yard run (Jason Hanson kick), 10:36. Lions 27–24. **Drive: 13 plays, 80 yards, 6:15.**

**Top passers**

- MIN – Todd Bouman – 18/38, 243 yards, 2 TD, 2 INT
- DET – Mike McMahon – 15/28, 241 yards

**Top rushers**

- MIN – Michael Bennett – 10 rushes, 40 yards
- DET – James "Little Man" Stewart – 20 rushes, 91 yards

**Top receivers**

- MIN – Randy Moss – 7 receptions, 144 yards, 2 TD
- DET – Johnnie Morton – 4 receptions, 74 yards

==== Week 15: vs. Jacksonville Jaguars ====
Week 15: Jacksonville Jaguars at Minnesota Vikings – Game summary

Quarter	1	2	3	4	Total
**Jaguars**	10	6	7	10	**33**
Vikings	0	3	0	0	**3**

at Hubert H. Humphrey Metrodome, Minneapolis, Minnesota

- Date: December 23
- Game time: 12:00 p.m. CDT
- Game weather: None (indoor stadium)
- Game attendance: 64,150
- Referee: Ron Blum (7)
- Recap, Game Book

Game information

**First quarter**

- JAX – Mike Hollis 39-yard field goal, 11:02. Jaguars 3–0. **Drive: 7 plays, 50 yards, 3:58.**
- JAX – Stacey Mack 3-yard run (Mike Hollis kick), 8:42. Jaguars 10–0. **Drive: 5 plays, 56 yards, 1:46.**

**Second quarter**

- JAX – Mike Hollis 23-yard field goal, 11:15. Jaguars 13–0. **Drive: 11 plays, 75 yards, 5:29.**
- JAX – Mike Hollis 21-yard field goal, 4:54. Jaguars 16–0. **Drive: 9 plays, 52 yards, 3:56.**
- MIN – Gary Anderson 32-yard field goal, 0:00. Jaguars 16–3. **Drive: 15 plays, 62 yards, 4:54.**

**Third quarter**

- JAX – Keenan McCardell 10-yard pass from Mark Brunell (Mike Hollis kick), 0:40. Jaguars 23–3. **Drive: 14 plays, 85 yards, 7:46.**

**Fourth quarter**

- JAX – Mike Hollis 21-yard field goal, 12:09. Jaguars 26–3. **Drive: 5 plays, 15 yards, 2:03.**
- JAX – Stacey Mack 2-yard run (Mike Hollis kick), 2:12. Jaguars 33–3. **Drive: 11 plays, 84 yards, 7:07.**

**Top passers**

- JAX – Mark Brunell – 17/24, 217 yards, TD
- MIN – Spergon Wynn – 24/39, 218 yards, INT

**Top rushers**

- JAX – Stacey Mack – 27 rushes, 111 yards, 2 TD
- MIN – Michael Bennett – 11 rushes, 17 yards

**Top receivers**

- JAX – Jimmy Smith – 8 receptions, 122 yards
- MIN – Cris Carter – 7 receptions, 88 yards

As of 2026, this remains the Vikings' only loss to the Jaguars.

==== Week 16: at Green Bay Packers ====
Week 16: Minnesota Vikings at Green Bay Packers – Game summary

Quarter	1	2	3	4	Total
Vikings	0	3	3	7	**13**
**Packers**	0	7	0	17	**24**

at Lambeau Field, Green Bay, Wisconsin

- Date: December 30
- Game time: 12:00 p.m. CDT
- Game weather: Partly cloudy, 19 °F (−7 °C)
- Game attendance: 59,870
- Referee: Larry Nemmers (20)
- Recap, Game Book

Game information

**First quarter**

- No scoring plays.

**Second quarter**

- MIN – Gary Anderson 44-yard field goal, 8:16. Vikings 3–0. **Drive: 5 plays, 43 yards, 1:47.**
- GB – Donald Driver 31-yard run (Ryan Longwell kick), 3:18. Packers 7–3. **Drive: 7 plays, 70 yards, 4:58.**

**Third quarter**

- MIN – Gary Anderson 42-yard field goal, 5:07. Packers 7–6. **Drive: 4 plays, 8 yards, 1:14.**

**Fourth quarter**

- GB – Ryan Longwell 24-yard field goal, 11:57. Packers 10–6. **Drive: 6 plays, 19 yards, 2:55.**
- MIN – Byron Chamberlain 47-yard pass from Spergon Wynn (Gary Anderson kick), 10:03. Vikings 13–10. **Drive: 5 plays, 59 yards, 1:54.**
- GB – Ahman Green 4-yard run (Ryan Longwell kick), 6:28. Packers 17–13. **Drive: 7 plays, 79 yards, 3:35.**
- GB – Mike McKenzie 38-yard interception return (Ryan Longwell kick), 5:25. Packers 24–13.

**Top passers**

- MIN – Spergon Wynn – 11/30, 114 yards, TD, 3 INT
- GB – Brett Favre – 18/29, 169 yards

**Top rushers**

- MIN – Michael Bennett – 25 rushes, 104 yards
- GB – Ahman Green – 16 rushes, 31 yards, TD

**Top receivers**

- MIN – Byron Chamberlain – 3 receptions, 66 yards, TD
- GB – Antonio Freeman – 3 receptions, 43 yards

==== Week 17: at Baltimore Ravens ====
Week 17: Minnesota Vikings at Baltimore Ravens – Game summary

Quarter	1	2	3	4	Total
Vikings	3	0	0	0	**3**
**Ravens**	0	9	3	7	**19**

at PSINet Stadium, Baltimore, Maryland

- Date: January 7
- Game time: 9:00 p.m. CDT
- Game weather: 36 °F (2 °C)
- Game attendance: 69,465
- Referee: Gerald Austin (34)
- Recap, Game Book

Game information

**First quarter**

- MIN – Gary Anderson 26-yard field goal, 5:50. Vikings 3–0. **Drive: 9 plays, 55 yards, 4:56.**

**Second quarter**

- BAL – Matt Stover 21-yard field goal, 14:57. Tied 3–3. **Drive: 11 plays, 77 yards, 5:53.**
- BAL – Matt Stover 20-yard field goal, 6:29. Ravens 6–3. **Drive: 11 plays, 43 yards, 5:47.**
- BAL – Matt Stover 38-yard field goal, 0:00. Ravens 9–3. **Drive: 6 plays, 60 yards, 0:58.**

**Third quarter**

- BAL – Matt Stover 20-yard field goal, 3:52. Ravens 12–3. **Drive: 10 plays, 85 yards, 5:22.**

**Fourth quarter**

- BAL – Jamie Sharper 8-yard fumble return (Matt Stover kick), 1:37. Ravens 19–3.

**Top passers**

- MIN – Spergon Wynn – 13/29, 86 yards, 2 INT
- BAL – Elvis Grbac – 10/27, 160 yards

**Top rushers**

- MIN – Michael Bennett – 13 rushes, 52 yards
- BAL – Terry Allen – 23 rushes, 133 yards

**Top receivers**

- MIN – Cris Carter – 5 receptions, 60 yards
- BAL – Shannon Sharpe – 2 receptions, 51 yards

=== Standings ===
NFC Central
	W	L	T	PCT	PF	PA	STK
^{(2)} Chicago Bears	13	3	0	.813	338	203	W4
^{(4)} Green Bay Packers	12	4	0	.750	390	266	W3
^{(6)} Tampa Bay Buccaneers	9	7	0	.563	324	280	L1
Minnesota Vikings	5	11	0	.313	290	390	L4
Detroit Lions	2	14	0	.125	270	424	W1

== Statistics ==
=== Team leaders ===
Category	Player(s)	Value
Passing yards	Daunte Culpepper	2,612
Passing touchdowns	Daunte Culpepper	14
Rushing yards	Michael Bennett	682
Rushing touchdowns	Daunte Culpepper	5
Receiving yards	Randy Moss	1,233
Receiving touchdowns	Randy Moss	10
Points	Gary Anderson	74
Kickoff return yards	Nate Jacquet	1,012
Punt return yards	Nate Jacquet	219
Tackles	Kailee Wong	98
Sacks	Chris Hovan	6
Interceptions	Robert Griffith; Eric Kelly	2
Forced fumbles	Patrick Chukwurah	3

=== League rankings ===
Category	Total yards	Yards per game	NFL rank (out of 31)
Passing offense	3,576	223.5	7th
Rushing offense	1,609	100.6	25th
Total offense	5,185	324.1	12th
Passing defense	3,367	210.4	18th
Rushing defense	2,299	143.7	30th
Total defense	5,666	354.1	27th
