= Kailee Wong =

American football player (born 1976)

No. 52
- Position: Linebacker

Personal information
- Born: May 23, 1976 (age 50); Eugene, Oregon, U.S.
- Listed height: 6 ft 2 in (1.88 m)
- Listed weight: 250 lb (113 kg)

Career information
- High school: North Eugene (Eugene, Oregon)
- College: Stanford
- NFL draft: 1998: 2nd round, 51st overall pick

Career history
- Minnesota Vikings (1998–2001); Houston Texans (2002–2006)

Awards and highlights
- First-team All-American (1997); 2× First-team All-Pac-10 (1996, 1997)

Career NFL statistics
- Tackles: 496
- Sacks: 21.5
- Forced fumbles: 2
- Fumble recoveries: 2
- Interceptions: 6
- Defensive touchdowns: 1
- Stats at Pro Football Reference

Kailee Wong
- Traditional Chinese: 王凱利
- Simplified Chinese: 王凯利
Transcriptions
Standard Mandarin
- Hanyu Pinyin: Wáng Kǎilì
Yue: Cantonese
- Jyutping: Wong^{4} Hoi^{2}lei^{6}

Kailee Warner Wong (born May 23, 1976) is an American former professional football player who was a linebacker in the National Football League (NFL). Originally from Eugene, Oregon, he played college football for the Stanford Cardinal and was a first-team All-American as a senior. Selected in the second round of the 1998 NFL draft, Wong played in the NFL for nine seasons, first for the Minnesota Vikings from 1999 to 2001. In 2002, he was part of the inaugural roster of the Houston Texans, with whom he played until 2006. He had 496 tackles, 21.5 sacks, and six interceptions in his NFL career.

== Early life and college career ==
Wong's father is of Native Hawaiian and Chinese descent, and his mother is of German and Scottish descent. Growing up in Eugene, Oregon, he attended North Eugene High School. At North Eugene, he played football and basketball and was a consensus first-team Prep All-American as a senior in 1993.

Out of high school, Wong was recruited to Stanford University by head coach Bill Walsh. An economics major, Wong played at defensive end for the Stanford Cardinal football team from 1994 to 1997, the last three seasons under head coach Tyrone Willingham and last two as full time starter. In 1994, Wong started six games at left defensive end and one at right outside linebacker, with 23 total tackles including two tackles for loss and one sack, in addition to a fumble recovery and three passes defended. Starting seven games, including five at right defensive end, Wong then had 39 total tackles, including five tackles for loss and one sack in 1995.

In his first season as full time starting defensive end in 1996, Wong made 63 total tackles, including 21 tackles for loss and 12 sacks, along with an interception. Wong earned first-team All-Pac-10 honors in 1996. As a senior in 1997, he had 47 total tackles, including 22 tackles for loss and again 12 sacks. He also had two safeties, one blocked kick, one forced fumble, two fumble recoveries, and three passes deflected. Wong was the team MVP at Stanford and earned first-team All-Pac-10 honors for the second year in a row, and he also made the Football News first-team All-American team. He was also a finalist for the Lombardi Award.

Wong graduated from Stanford in 1998 with a Bachelor of Science degree in economics. In addition to his undergraduate degree from Stanford, "Wong completed executive education programs at Harvard Business School, The Wharton School and the Stanford Graduate School of Business."

== Pro football career ==
=== Minnesota Vikings (1998–2001) ===
Wong was selected by the Minnesota Vikings in the second round (51st overall) in the 1998 NFL draft. As a rookie, Wong came off the bench for 15 games with 14 tackles and 1.5 sacks for a Vikings team that finished 15–1. In 1999, Wong played in 15 games with eight starts, making 49 tackles, three tackles for loss, one fumble recovery, and two passes defended.

In his first season as full time starter, Wong had a career-high 112 tackles in 2000, along with two interceptions and four passees defended. Again starting every game in 2001, his final season with the Vikings, Wong had 99 tackles, seven tackles for loss, three sacks, four passes defended, and an interception of Brett Favre returned for his first career touchdown.

=== Houston Texans (2002–2006) ===
On March 7, 2002, Wong signed as a free agent with the expansion team Houston Texans. Starting all 16 games of 2002 at left outside linebacker, Wong had 44 tackles, a career high 5.5 sacks, and eight passes defended. In 2003, Wong again started all 16 games, making 44 tackles, eight tackles for loss, three sacks, and 11 passes defended. Moving to right outside linebacker in 2004, Wong started all 16 games, with 71 tackles, and eight tackles for loss, in addition to tying his career high in sacks with 5.5 and reaching a new career high in passes defended with 14.

In 2005, Wong started five games before a season-ending knee injury. He had 33 tackles and one sack. Wong played 10 games as a reserve with the Texans in his final NFL season in 2006, making 12 tackles. Wong played in a total of 123 games with 93 starts in his nine-season career.

== NFL career statistics ==
Legend
**Bold**	Career high

=== Regular season ===
Year	Team	Games		Tackles				Interceptions				Fumbles			
Year	Team	GP	GS	Comb	Solo	Ast	Sck	Int	Yds	TD	Lng	FF	FR	Yds	TD
1998	MIN	15	0	14	12	2	1.5	0	0	0	0	0	0	0	0
1999	MIN	13	8	49	34	15	0.0	0	0	0	0	0	**1**	**4**	0
2000	MIN	16	16	**112**	**84**	**28**	2.0	2	**28**	0	14	0	0	0	0
2001	MIN	16	16	99	83	16	3.0	1	27	**1**	**27**	0	0	0	0
2002	HOU	16	16	44	34	10	**5.5**	0	0	0	0	0	0	0	0
2003	HOU	16	16	62	49	13	3.0	0	0	0	0	**1**	0	0	0
2004	HOU	16	16	71	51	20	**5.5**	**3**	0	0	0	**1**	**1**	0	0
2005	HOU	5	5	33	21	12	1.0	0	0	0	0	0	0	0	0
2006	HOU	10	0	12	9	3	0.0	0	0	0	0	0	0	0	0
Career		123	93	496	377	119	21.5	6	55	1	27	2	2	4	0

=== Playoffs ===
Year	Team	Games		Tackles				Interceptions				Fumbles			
Year	Team	GP	GS	Comb	Solo	Ast	Sck	Int	Yds	TD	Lng	FF	FR	Yds	TD
1999	MIN	2	1	5	5	0	0.0	0	0	0	0	0	0	0	0
2000	MIN	2	2	**18**	**12**	**6**	0.0	**1**	**1**	0	**1**	0	0	0	0
Career		4	3	23	17	6	0.0	1	1	0	1	0	0	0	0

== Post-football career ==
In 2005, Wong co-founded a commercial real estate firm, Cardinal Management. He also started e3 Advantage, a company focused on energy efficiency.

In 2017, Wong and his wife Marissa founded The Athletic Room, a chiropractic wellness center in Houston.

== Personal life ==
Wong is married to Marissa Lopez, sister of actor and TV host Mario Lopez, and has four children, two boys and two girls. Wong and his family lived in Missouri City, Texas when Wong played for the Texans.
