= Carey Scott (American football) =

American football player (born 1978)

No. 41
- Position: Cornerback

Personal information
- Born: August 11, 1978 (age 48); Savannah, Georgia U.S.
- Listed height: 5 ft 11 in (1.80 m)
- Listed weight: 214 lb (97 kg)

Career information
- High school: Beach
- College: Kentucky State
- NFL draft: 2001: 6th round, 189th overall pick

Career history
- Minnesota Vikings (2001); Oakland Raiders (2002); Minnesota Vikings (2002); Oakland Raiders (2003)

Career NFL statistics
- Total tackles: 2
- Stats at Pro Football Reference

Carey Scott (August 11, 1978) is an American former professional football player who was a cornerback for the Minnesota Vikings and Oakland Raiders of National Football League (NFL). He played college football at Kentucky State University.
