= Michael Bennett (running back) =

American football player (born 1978)

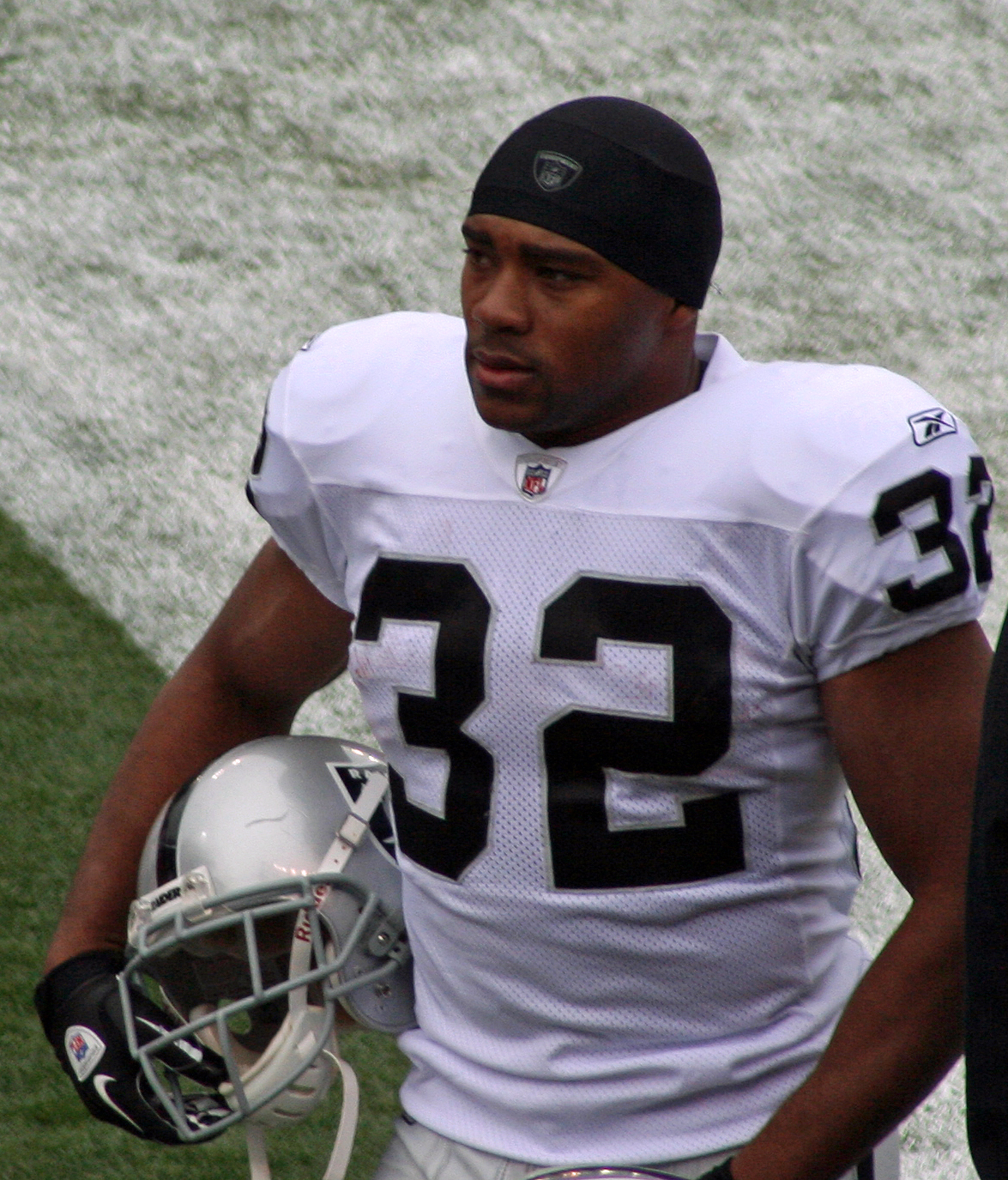
- Bennett with the Oakland Raiders in 2010

No. 23, 26, 29, 32
- Position: Running back

Personal information
- Born: August 13, 1978 (age 48); Milwaukee, Wisconsin, U.S.
- Listed height: 5 ft 10 in (1.78 m)
- Listed weight: 211 lb (96 kg)

Career information
- High school: Milwaukee Trade and Technical
- College: Wisconsin (1998–2000)
- NFL draft: 2001: 1st round, 27th overall pick

Career history
- Minnesota Vikings (2001–2005); New Orleans Saints (2006)*; Kansas City Chiefs (2006–2007); Tampa Bay Buccaneers (2007–2008); San Diego Chargers (2008–2009); Oakland Raiders (2010)
- * Offseason or practice squad member only

Awards and highlights
- Pro Bowl (2002); Second-team All-Big Ten (2000)

Career NFL statistics
- Rushing attempts: 842
- Rushing yards: 3,703
- Rushing touchdowns: 13
- Receptions: 159
- Receiving yards: 1,294
- Receiving touchdowns: 6
- Stats at Pro Football Reference

Michael A. Bennett (born August 13, 1978) is an American former professional football player who was a running back in the National Football League (NFL). He played college football for the Wisconsin Badgers. He was selected by the Minnesota Vikings in the first round of the 2001 NFL draft with the 27th overall pick. A Pro Bowl selection with the Vikings in 2002, Bennett was also a member of the New Orleans Saints, Kansas City Chiefs, Tampa Bay Buccaneers, San Diego Chargers, and Oakland Raiders.

== Early life ==
Bennett attended Milwaukee Trade and Technical High School. As a senior, he was ranked the top football player in the state, and was an All-State selection. In 1998, while attending high school at Milwaukee Technical, Bennett set the Wisconsin State Division 1 200m record at the Wisconsin State Track Meet with a time of 20.68 seconds. He still holds the record to this day.

== College career ==
Bennett attended the University of Wisconsin–Madison and was a standout in football and in track as a sprinter. He spent two years as a backup to Ron Dayne, but, as a junior, Bennett rushed for 1,592 yards and scored ten touchdowns, despite missing two games due to injury.

=== Track and field ===
As a junior at the 1997 state track meet, Bennett set records in the 100 meter and 200 meter dashes, then broke both records as a senior in 1998. Both his 100m time of 10.33 seconds and 200m time of 20.68 seconds still stand as state records as of 2024.

==== Personal bests ====
Event	Time (seconds)	Venue	Date
60 meters	6.67	Fayetteville, Arkansas	May 10, 2000
100 meters	10.00 (wind-aided)	Austin, Texas	May 6, 2000
200 meters	20.66	Tempe, Arizona	May 18, 2000

== Professional career ==
Pre-draft measurables
Height	Weight	40-yard dash	10-yard split	20-yard split	20-yard shuttle	Three-cone drill	Vertical jump	Broad jump	Bench press
5 ft 10 in (1.78 m)	207 lb (94 kg)	4.38 s	1.52 s	2.54 s	4.21 s	6.84 s	39.5 in (1.00 m)	10 ft 10 in (3.30 m)	13 reps
All values from Wisconsin Pro Day.

=== Minnesota Vikings ===
Bennett was selected by the Minnesota Vikings in the first round (27th overall) of the 2001 NFL draft. As a rookie in 2001, he was thrust into a starting role after the sudden retirement of star running back Robert Smith. In 2002, Bennett rushed for 1,296 yards and added 351 yards receiving on his way to the Pro Bowl. However, his career stalled due to injuries the following year.

The Vikings released Bennett at the conclusion of the 2005 NFL season.

=== New Orleans Saints ===
Bennett was signed by the New Orleans Saints to serve as the backup to Deuce McAllister. After the addition of Reggie Bush in the 2006 NFL draft, Bennett became expendable and was traded to the Kansas City Chiefs for a fourth round draft choice.

=== Kansas City Chiefs ===
Bennett spent the 2006 season and part of the 2007 season with the Kansas City Chiefs. He played in 17 games for the Chiefs in all, carrying the ball 56 times for 252 yards and no touchdowns. He was traded to the Tampa Bay Buccaneers just over a month in the 2007 season.

=== Tampa Bay Buccaneers ===
On October 16, 2007, the Buccaneers acquired Bennett from the Chiefs after injuries to running backs Carnell Williams and Michael Pittman. His first touchdown as a Buccaneer came in Week 8 of the 2007 season against the Jacksonville Jaguars off a 19-yard swing pass run.

On February 15, 2008, Bennett re-signed with the Buccaneers in lieu of becoming an unrestricted free agent. Bennett was released on November 11 when Carnell Williams was activated from the PUP list.

=== San Diego Chargers ===
Bennett was claimed off waivers by the San Diego Chargers on November 12, 2008. The team released linebacker Derek Smith to make room for him on the roster. He was released on March 4, 2010. During the 2009 season with San Diego, Bennett played in six games, rushing 23 times for 65 yards, and catching six passes for 65 yards.

=== Oakland Raiders ===
Bennett signed with the Oakland Raiders on May 6, 2010. He was released on September 5, 2011. During the 2010 season with Oakland, he gained 11 yards rushing and nine yards receiving while playing in seven games.

== NFL career statistics ==
Year	Team	Games		Rushing					Receiving				
Year	Team	GP	GS	Att	Yds	Avg	Lng	TD	Rec	Yds	Avg	Lng	TD
2001	MIN	13	13	172	682	4.0	31	2	29	226	7.8	80	1
2002	MIN	16	16	255	1,296	5.1	85	5	37	351	9.5	45	1
2003	MIN	8	7	90	447	5.0	28	1	12	132	11.0	40	0
2004	MIN	11	7	70	276	3.9	25	1	21	207	9.9	38	1
2005	MIN	16	6	126	473	3.8	61	3	27	124	4.6	20	2
2006	KC	11	0	36	200	5.6	41	0	9	77	8.6	14	0
2007	KC	6	0	20	52	2.6	12	0	10	47	4.7	9	0
2007	TB	8	1	41	189	4.6	28	1	5	54	10.8	23	1
2008	TB	5	0	7	12	1.7	4	0	1	2	2.0	2	0
2008	SD	2	0	0	0	0.0	0	0	0	0	0.0	0	0
2009	SD	6	0	23	65	2.8	14	0	6	65	10.8	33	0
2010	OAK	7	0	2	11	5.5	6	0	2	9	4.5	6	0
Career		109	50	842	3,703	4.4	85	13	159	1,294	8.1	80	6
