= Eric Kelly (American football) =

American football player (born 1977)

No. 25
- Position: Cornerback

Personal information
- Born: January 15, 1977 (age 49); Milwaukee, Wisconsin, U.S.
- Listed height: 5 ft 10 in (1.78 m)
- Listed weight: 201 lb (91 kg)

Career information
- High school: Bay (Panama City, Florida)
- College: Kentucky
- NFL draft: 2001: 3rd round, 69th overall pick

Career history
- Minnesota Vikings (2001–2003); Houston Texans (2004)*; Chicago Bears (2004)*
- * Offseason or practice squad member only

Career NFL statistics
- Tackles: 161
- Interceptions: 3
- Forced fumbles: 1
- Stats at Pro Football Reference

Eric Kelly (born January 15, 1977) is an American former professional football player who was a cornerback in the National Football League (NFL). He played college football for the Kentucky Wildcats and was selected by the Minnesota Vikings in the third round (69th overall) of the 2001 NFL draft.

== College career ==
Kelly starred for the University of Kentucky Wildcats from 1997 to 2000, where he was usually asked to play man coverage with the best receiver of the opposition. Kelly graduated from Bay High School in Panama City, Florida in 1997, where he played running back and outside linebacker. There, under head coach Jim Scroggins, he led the "Fightin' Tornados" to a 23–5 record his last two years in high school, including trips to the Florida state quarter-finals and a narrow loss in the state championship game.

== Professional career ==
He was selected as a cornerback by the Vikings in the third round (69th overall) of the 2001 NFL draft. Prior to the 2004 season, he re-signed with the Minnesota Vikings on April 13, 2004, but got cut on June 18, 2004, after asking for his release after sliding on the depth chart. He signed with the Houston Texans off of waivers on June 28, 2004, but got cut due to not taking a pay cut. Then he signed with the Chicago Bears on August 8, 2004, but got cut due to injury.

== NFL career statistics ==
Legend
**Bold**	Career high

Year	Team	Games		Tackles					Interceptions					Fumbles			
Year	Team	GP	GS	Cmb	Solo	Ast	Sck	TFL	Int	Yds	TD	Lng	PD	FF	FR	Yds	TD
2001	MIN	16	11	**80**	63	**17**	0.0	**2**	**2**	-7	0	**2**	**7**	**1**	0	0	0
2002	MIN	16	12	73	**66**	7	0.0	0	1	0	0	0	2	0	0	0	0
2003	MIN	16	0	8	7	1	0.0	0	0	0	0	0	0	0	0	0	0
		48	23	161	136	25	0.0	2	3	-7	0	2	9	1	0	0	0
