= Lewis Kelly =

American football player (born 1977)

No. 61
- Position: Guard

Personal information
- Born: April 21, 1977 (age 49); Lithonia, Georgia, U.S.
- Listed height: 6 ft 4 in (1.93 m)
- Listed weight: 310 lb (141 kg)

Career information
- High school: Henderson (DeKalb County, Georgia)
- College: South Carolina State (1995–1999)
- NFL draft: 2000: 7th round, 248th overall pick

Career history
- Minnesota Vikings (2000–2003); → Frankfurt Galaxy (2002); New York Giants (2005–2006)

Career NFL statistics
- Games played: 18
- Games started: 5
- Stats at Pro Football Reference

Lewis Kelly (born April 21, 1977) is an American former professional football player who was an offensive guard in the National Football League (NFL) for the Minnesota Vikings from 2000 to 2003 and the New York Giants from 2005 to 2006. He played college football for the South Carolina State Bulldogs and was selected in the seventh round of the 2000 NFL draft with the 248th overall pick.

Kelly attended South Carolina State University, where he joined the Beta Delta chapter of Alpha Phi Alpha fraternity in spring 2000. He has three children.
