= Patrick Chukwurah =

Nigerian gridiron football player (born 1979)

No. 50, 55, 54, 97, 56
- Position: Defensive end

Personal information
- Born: March 1, 1979 (age 47); Nigeria
- Listed height: 6 ft 1 in (1.85 m)
- Listed weight: 250 lb (113 kg)

Career information
- High school: MacArthur (Irving, Texas, U.S.)
- College: Wyoming
- NFL draft: 2001: 5th round, 157th overall pick

Career history
- Minnesota Vikings (2001–2002); Houston Texans (2003)*; Denver Broncos (2003–2006); Tampa Bay Buccaneers (2007–2008); Florida Tuskers (2009–2010); Seattle Seahawks (2012)
- * Offseason or practice squad member only

Awards and highlights
- First-team All-MW (2000); Second-team All-MW (1999)

Career NFL statistics
- Total tackles: 83
- Sacks: 9
- Forced fumbles: 4
- Fumble recoveries: 1
- Stats at Pro Football Reference

Patrick C. Chukwurah (born March 1, 1979) is a Nigerian former professional American football defensive end. He was selected by the Minnesota Vikings in the fifth round of the 2001 NFL draft. He played college football at Wyoming.

Chukwurah has also been a member of the Houston Texans, Denver Broncos, Tampa Bay Buccaneers, Florida Tuskers, and Seattle Seahawks.

== College career ==
Chukwurah went to the University of Wyoming. He was a three-year starter there and played in 45 career games while racking up 245 tackles and 27 sacks. As a senior, he earned first team All-Mountain West Conference honors, recording 100 tackles and seven sacks. He was UW's defensive captain his senior year. As a junior, he was a second team all-conference selection and earned defensive MVP honors. He ranks 11th on UW's tackles list.

== Professional career ==
=== Minnesota Vikings ===
He was drafted with the 26th pick of the 5th round in the 2001 NFL draft by the Minnesota Vikings. On June 18, he signed a 3-year contract with the Minnesota Vikings. During the 2001 season, he played in all 16 games, starting 3 of them, while recording 9 tackles and 2½ sacks. He made his NFL debut on September 9, 2001, against the Carolina Panthers, recording 4 tackles and becoming the first Viking rookie linebacker to start a game since Dwayne Rudd did it in 1997 and the first to start the opener since Roy Winston did it back in 1962. On November 19, he started his second career game against the New York Giants recording his first career sack, sacking quarterback Kerry Collins for a 14-yard loss. That game, he started at defensive end. On December 16, Chukwurah recorded a career high 1½ sacks against the Detroit Lions. In 2002, Patrick Chukwurah played in 11 games, starting two of them. He recorded a career high 14 tackles, recording 12 of them on special teams. At the Chicago Bears on September 8, 2002, he recorded 4 tackles, and on October 13, he recorded a career high 7 tackles against the Detroit Lions. On February 27, 2003, he was cut by the Vikings.

=== Houston Texans ===
On March 1, 2003, Chukwurah was acquired from waivers. During the training camp prior to the 2003 season, Patrick Chukwurah tried out for the Houston Texans, however got cut at the final cutdown on September 1.

=== Denver Broncos ===
On December 24, 2003, he signed with the Denver Broncos, but was only on the 53-man roster for 2 days, and was released on December 26. He re-signed with the Broncos on January 13, 2004, after the season ended. During the 2004 season, he played in 14 games recording only 4 tackles appearing primarily as a defensive end on passing downs. In 2005, he once again played in 14 games recording 9 tackles, two on defense and seven on special teams. He played in both postseason games that year, recording a special teams tackle against the New England Patriots on January 14, and played against the Pittsburgh Steelers in the AFC Championship game on January 22. On April 3, 2006, he re-signed with the Denver Broncos. During the 2006 season, Chukwurah converted to defensive end. He made his first career start at defensive end in week 1 against the St. Louis Rams.

=== Tampa Bay Buccaneers ===
On March 2, 2007, the first day of free agency, the Bucs signed Chukwurah to a five-year, $5.5 million contract. They released him after only one season with the Bucs on June 19, 2008. He later re-signed with them on August 27, 2008, but was released again on August 30. He was re-signed to the Bucs roster on December 17, 2008.

=== Florida Tuskers ===
Chukwurah was signed by the Florida Tuskers of the United Football League on August 25, 2009. In the league's first season, Chukwurah led the league in sacks.

=== Seattle Seahawks ===
Chukwurah was signed by the Seattle Seahawks on January 8, 2013.

=== Career statistics ===
Season	Team	GP	Tckl	Ast	Total	SCK	INT	Fum Rec
2001	Minnesota Vikings	16	8.0	5	13	2.5	0	0
2002	Minnesota Vikings	11	11.0	3	14	0	0	0
2003	Denver Broncos	0	0	0	0	0	0	0
2004	Denver Broncos	14	6.0	3	9	1	0	0
2005	Denver Broncos	14	6.0	2	8	0	0	0
2006	Denver Broncos	14	18.0	7	25	4.5	0	0
2007	Tampa Bay Buccaneers	9	11	1	12	1.0	0	0
2008	Tampa Bay Buccaneers	0	0	0	0	0.0	0	0
	Totals	78	60.0	21	81	9.0	0	0
