= Willie Howard =

American football player (born 1977)

No. 91
- Position: Defensive end

Personal information
- Born: Mountain View, California, U.S.
- Listed height: 6 ft 3 in (1.91 m)
- Listed weight: 298 lb (135 kg)

Career information
- College: Stanford
- NFL draft: 2001: 2nd round, 57th overall pick

Career history
- Minnesota Vikings (2001–2002)

Awards and highlights
- Third-team All-American (2000); Morris Trophy (1999); 2× First-team All-Pac-10 (1999, 2000)

Career NFL statistics
- Games played: 8
- Games started: 0
- Tackles: 10
- Stats at Pro Football Reference

Willie L. Howard is an American former professional football player who was a defensive end in the National Football League (NFL). He played college football for Stanford Cardinal. Howard was selected by the Minnesota Vikings in the second round of the 2001 NFL draft and played for them for two seasons before a serious injury ended his career.

Pre-draft measurables
Height	Weight	Arm length	Hand span	40-yard dash	Bench press
6 ft 3 3/8 in (1.91 m)	295 lb (134 kg)	33 in (0.84 m)	9 in (0.23 m)	4.94 s	23 reps
All values from NFL Combine

He was named the head football coach at Robbinsdale Cooper High School in 2010, and he is also the dean of students.
