= Antonio Wilson =

American football player (born 1977)

No. 54, 59
- Position: Linebacker

Personal information
- Born: December 29, 1977 (age 48); Seagoville, Texas, U.S.
- Listed height: 6 ft 2 in (1.88 m)
- Listed weight: 247 lb (112 kg)

Career information
- High school: Skyline (Dallas, Texas)
- College: Texas A&M–Commerce (1995–1999)
- NFL draft: 2000: 4th round, 106th overall pick

Career history
- Minnesota Vikings (2000–2002); → Barcelona Dragons (2001); Houston Texans (2003)*; Edmonton Eskimos (2004)
- * Offseason or practice squad member only

Awards and highlights
- First-team All-American (1999); LSC Defensive Lineman of the Year (1999)

Career NFL statistics
- Games played: 10
- Games started: 1
- Tackles: 20
- Stats at Pro Football Reference

Antonio Demarcus Wilson (born December 29, 1977) is an American former professional football player who was a linebacker for the Minnesota Vikings of the National Football League (NFL) from 2000 to 2002. He was selected by the Vikings in the fourth round of the 2000 NFL draft after playing college football for the Texas A&M–Commerce Lions. He was also a member of the Houston Texans of the NFL and the Edmonton Eskimos of the CFL.

== Early life ==
Antonio Demarcus Wilson was born on December 29, 1977, in Seagoville, Texas. He attended Skyline High School in Dallas, Texas.

== College career ==
Wilson played college football for the Texas A&M–Commerce from 1996 to 1999 and was a four-year letterman. He was redshirted in 1995. He was a three-time All-Lone Star Conference (LSC) selection and was also the LSC Defensive Lineman of the Year in 1999. Wilson was also named a first-team All-American by the Associated Press his senior year. He tied Danny Kirk for the school record for career tackles with 348. Wilson was inducted into the Texas A&M University-Commerce Athletic Hall of Fame in 2018.

== Professional career ==
Pre-draft measurables
Height	Weight	40-yard dash	10-yard split	20-yard split	Bench press
6 ft 2 in (1.88 m)	245 lb (111 kg)	4.56 s	1.56 s	2.61 s	11 reps
All values from NFL Combine

=== Minnesota Vikings ===
Wilson was selected by the Minnesota Vikings in the fourth round, with the 106th overall pick, of the 2000 NFL draft. He officially signed with the team on July 21. He played in one game during the 2000 season but recorded no statistics.

Wilson was allocated to NFL Europe in 2001 to play for the Barcelona Dragons during the 2001 NFL Europe season. He totaled 29 defensive tackles, two special teams tackles, two sacks, one interception, and five pass breakups for the Dragons in 2001. He was waived by the Vikings on September 2, 2001, and signed to the team's practice squad on September 4. He was promoted to the active roster on October 9 and was waived on October 25. Wilson was re-signed by the Vikings on October 30, 2001. Overall, he appeared in 10 games for the Vikings in 2001, recording six solo tackles, four assisted tackles, and one pass breakup.

Wilson was waived on September 17, 2002, but re-signed on September 24, 2002. He played in five games, including his only career NFL start, in 2002, totaling eight solo tackles and two assisted tackles. Wilson was released by the Vikings on February 27, 2003.

=== Houston Texans ===
Wilson signed with the Houston Texans on March 24, 2003. He was waived on August 26, 2003.

=== Edmonton Eskimos ===
Wilson dressed in two games for the Edmonton Eskimos of the Canadian Football League in 2004 and made two special teams tackles.
