= Stalin Colinet =

American football player (born 1974)

No. 93, 99
- Positions: Defensive end, Defensive tackle

Personal information
- Born: July 17, 1974 (age 52); New York City, U.S.
- Listed height: 6 ft 6 in (1.98 m)
- Listed weight: 289 lb (131 kg)

Career information
- High school: Cardinal Hayes (The Bronx, New York)
- College: Boston College
- NFL draft: 1997: 3rd round, 78th overall pick

Career history
- Minnesota Vikings (1997–1999); Cleveland Browns (1999–2001); Minnesota Vikings (2001); Jacksonville Jaguars (2002–2003)

Career NFL statistics
- Tackles: 90
- Sacks: 5.5
- Stats at Pro Football Reference

Stalin D. Colinet (/ˌkɒlɪˈneɪ/ KOL-ih-NAY; born July 17, 1974) is an American former professional football player who was a defensive tackle and defensive end in the National Football League (NFL). He played college football for the Boston College Eagles.

== Early life ==
Colinet was born in New York, to a Dominican mother, and a Haitian father. Colinet attended Cardinal Hayes High School where he lettered in football, basketball, and track. He was named Team MVP and a league all-star in his junior and senior years, and he was named to the CHSAA All-Star team as a senior. He was named to the list of the Top 100 High School Student-Athletes to Watch by the Chicago Tribune. Colinet was offered scholarships in basketball to Indiana and Penn State, but turned them down to play football at Boston College.

== College career ==
He played college ball at Boston College. He was one of Boston College's premier defensive lineman and was a team captain his senior year. Colinet was named First Team All-Big East and first Team ECAC in 1996 and voted the Best Defensive Player in New England.

Colinet ranks 3rd in all-time tackles for a loss at Boston College.

== Professional career ==
Colinet became the first Dominican player to be drafted and play in the NFL when he was selected by the Minnesota Vikings in the third round (78th pick) of the 1997 NFL draft. Colinet also spent time with the Cleveland Browns and Jacksonville Jaguars.
