= Talance Sawyer =

American football player (born 1976)

No. 97
- Position: Defensive end

Personal information
- Born: June 14, 1976 (age 50); Bastrop, Louisiana, U.S.

Career information
- High school: Bastrop
- College: UNLV
- NFL draft: 1999: 6th round, 185th overall pick

Career history
- Minnesota Vikings (1999–2003)

Career NFL statistics
- Tackles: 94
- Sacks: 11
- Interceptions: 1
- Stats at Pro Football Reference

Talance Sawyer (born June 14, 1976) is an American former professional football player who was a defensive end for the Minnesota Vikings of the National Football League (NFL). He played college football for the UNLV Rebels and was selected by the Vikings in the sixth round of the 1999 NFL draft.
