= 2002 Minnesota Vikings season =

NFL team season

- Head coach: Mike Tice
- Home stadium: Hubert H. Humphrey Metrodome

Results
- Record: 6–10
- Division place: 2nd NFC North
- Playoffs: Did not qualify
- All-Pros: DT Chris Hovan (2nd team)
- Pro Bowlers: 2: RB Michael Bennett (alternate); WR Randy Moss (injured)

Uniform
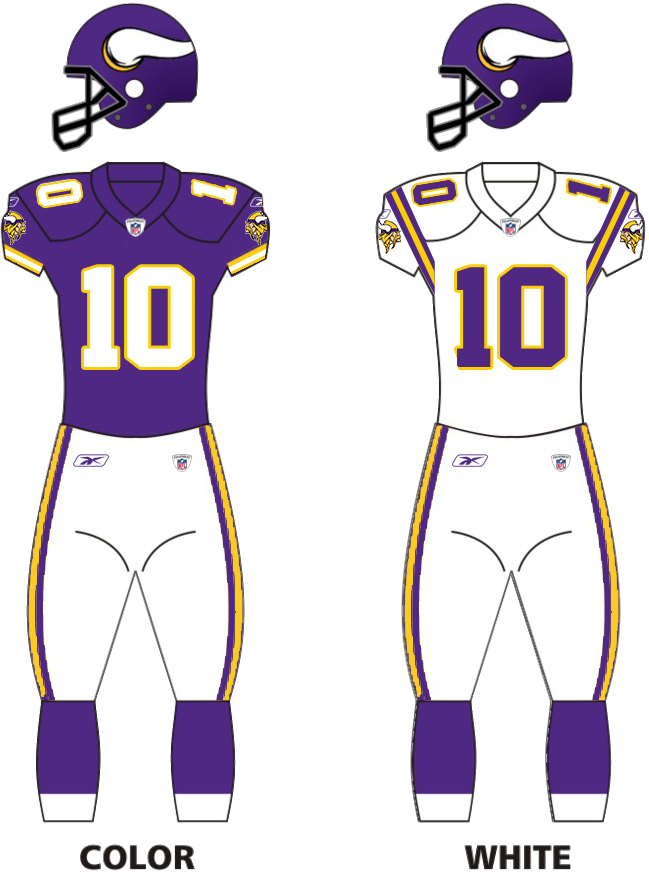

The 2002 season was the Minnesota Vikings' 42nd in the National Football League, and the first under head coach Mike Tice. Tice was the third of the Vikings' six head coaches to be promoted from within the team's coaching ranks but the first to have actually played for the team.

This for the first time since 1989, Cris Carter was not on the opening day roster. He signed with the Miami Dolphins in free agency.

The Vikings lost their opening game in Chicago 27–23 after surrendering a 20–10 halftime lead, and ended up going 0–4 before their bye week. Results improved after the bye, but they ultimately went 6–6 in their remaining games, including a three-game winning streak to end the season. They finished the season with a 6–10 record and missed the playoffs for the second year in a row.

Second-year running back Michael Bennett enjoyed a successful year, rushing for 1,296 yards, resulting in a Pro Bowl selection at the end of the season. After losing Cris Carter to retirement, Randy Moss had a career-high 106 receptions, but only had 7 touchdowns.

== Offseason ==
Additions	Subtractions
WR Derrick Alexander (Chiefs)	T Brad Badger (Raiders)
WR D'Wayne Bates (Bears)	P Mitch Berger (Rams)
LB Greg Biekert (Raiders)	WR Cris Carter (Dolphins)
CB Corey Chavous (Cardinals)	CB Dale Carter (Saints)
LB Henri Crockett (Falcons)	WR Jake Reed (Saints)
DE Kenny Mixon (Dolphins)	LB Kailee Wong (Texans)
P Kyle Richardson (Ravens)	WR Troy Walters (Colts)
FS Ronnie Bradford (Falcons)	FS Robert Griffith (Browns)
DE Lorenzo Bromell (Dolphins)	CB Robert Tate (Ravens)
TE Hunter Goodwin (Dolphins)	CB Kenny Wright (Texans)
DE Chuck Wiley (Falcons)	

=== 2002 draft ===
Pro Bowler

2002 Minnesota Vikings Draft
Draft order		Player name	Position	College	Notes
Round	Overall	Player name	Position	College	Notes
1	7	Bryant McKinnie	Offensive tackle	Miami (FL)	
2	38	Raonall Smith	Linebacker	Washington State	
3	70	Willie Offord	Safety	South Carolina	
4	105	Brian Williams	Cornerback	NC State	
4	132	Ed Ta'amu	Guard	Utah	Compensatory pick
5	141	Traded to the Cleveland Browns (Note: Minnesota traded their fifth-round selection (141st overall) to the Browns in exchange for QB Spergon Wynn and RB Travis Prentice.)			
6	177	Nick Rogers	Linebacker	Georgia Tech	
7	218	Chad Beasley	Offensive tackle	Virginia Tech	

=== Undrafted free agents ===
2002 undrafted free agents of note
Player	Position	College
Jeremy Allen	Running back	Iowa
Atrews Bell	Wide receiver	Florida State
Jack Brewer	Safety	Minnesota
Kelly Campbell	Wide receiver	Georgia Tech
Carlos Daniels	Running back	Western Illinois
Nick Davis	Wide receiver	Wisconsin
Todd France	Kicker	Toledo
Kyries Hebert	Safety	Louisiana–Lafayette
Shaun Hill	Quarterback	Maryland
Dane Krager	Linebacker	Angelo State
Devin Lewis	Wide receiver	Southern
Nick Murphy	Punter	Arizona State
Max Yates	Linebacker	Marshall

== Staff ==
2002 Minnesota Vikings staff
Front office: Owner – Red McCombs; President – Gary Woods; Vice president of football operations – Rob Brzezinski; Head coaches: Head coach – Mike Tice; Assistant head coach/defensive line – George O'Leary; Offensive coaches: Offensive coordinator – Scott Linehan; Quarterbacks – Alex Wood; Running backs – Dean Dalton; Wide receivers – Charlie Baggett; Tight ends/assistant offensive line – John Tice; Offensive line – Steve Loney; Offensive assistant/quality control – Jim Panagos	Defensive coaches: Defensive coordinator/secondary – Willie Shaw; Linebackers – Brian Baker; Defensive backfield – Chuck Knox Jr.; Defensive assistant/quality control – Pete Bercich; Special teams coaches: Special teams – Jay Hayes; Strength and conditioning: Strength and conditioning – Steve Wetzel; Assistant strength and conditioning – Daryl Lawrence

== Roster ==
2002 Minnesota Vikings roster
Quarterbacks (QB): 8 Todd Bouman; 11 Daunte Culpepper; 13 Shaun Hill; Running backs (RB): 23 Michael Bennett; 33 Harold Morrow FB; 20 Moe Williams; 44 James Wofford; Wide receivers (WR): 85 D'Wayne Bates PR; 16 Kelly Campbell; 17 Nick Davis; 89 Cedric James KR; 84 Randy Moss; 81 Chris Walsh; Tight ends (TE): 87 Byron Chamberlain; 83 Hunter Goodwin; 40 Jim Kleinsasser FB	Offensive linemen (OL): 78 Matt Birk C; 71 David Dixon G; 64 Michael Early C/G; 72 Adam Haayer T; 63 Corbin Lacina G; 62 Everett Lindsay G/T; 76 Chris Liwienski T; 74 Bryant McKinnie T; 60 Cory Withrow C; Defensive linemen (DL): 91 Lorenzo Bromell DE; 93 Darius Holland DT; 99 Chris Hovan DT; 51 Lance Johnstone DE; 95 Cedric Killings DT; 79 Kenny Mixon DE/DT; 98 Fred Robbins DT; 94 Chuck Wiley DE	Linebackers (LB): 54 Greg Biekert MLB; 50 Patrick Chukwurah OLB; 52 Henri Crockett OLB; 55 Lemanski Hall OLB; 56 Jim Nelson OLB; 58 Nick Rogers OLB; 59 Antonio Wilson OLB; Defensive backs (DB): 26 Ronnie Bradford FS; 42 Jack Brewer FS; 22 Tyrone Carter CB; 21 Corey Chavous; 25 Eric Kelly CB; 24 Willie Offord SS; 27 Brian Russell SS; 41 Carey Scott CB; 29 Brian Williams CB; Special teams (ST): 1 Gary Anderson K; 6 Hayden Epstein K; 43 Brody Liddiard LS; 5 Kyle Richardson P	Practice squad: 47 Jeremy Allen FB; 49 Jeff Kostrewa TE; 28 Larry Ned RB; 69 Kenny Sandlin C; 75 Ed Ta'amu G (IR); 66 Lorenzo White T; Reserve: 82 Derrick Alexander WR (IR); 34 Doug Chapman RB (IR); 15 Kenny Clark WR (IR); 92 Winfield Garnett DT (IR); -- Willie Howard DE (IR); 61 Lewis Kelly G (IR); -- O. J. Santiago TE (IR); 97 Talance Sawyer DE (IR); 57 Raonall Smith LB (IR); Rookies in italics 53 active, 10 reserve, 5 practice squad

== Preseason ==
=== Schedule ===
Week	Date	Opponent	Result	Record	Venue	Attendance	NFL.com recap
1	August 10	Cleveland Browns	L 15–27	0–1	Hubert H. Humphrey Metrodome	63,532	Recap
2	August 16	at Buffalo Bills	W 24–21	1–1	Ralph Wilson Stadium	47,027	Recap
3	August 23	Tennessee Titans	W 14–10	2–1	Hubert H. Humphrey Metrodome	63,845	Recap
4	August 29	at Pittsburgh Steelers	L 14–17	2–2	Heinz Field	57,062	Recap

=== Game summaries ===
==== Week 1: vs. Cleveland Browns ====
Week 1: Cleveland Browns at Minnesota Vikings – Game summary

Quarter	1	2	3	4	Total
Browns	7	6	14	0	27
Vikings	7	0	0	8	15

at Hubert H. Humphrey Metrodome, Minneapolis, Minnesota

- Date: August 10
- Game time: 7:00 p.m. CDT
- Game weather: None (indoor stadium)
- Game attendance: 63,532
- Referee: Dick Hantak (105)
- Recap, Game Book

Game information

First quarter

- CLE – Jamel White 45-yard pass from Tim Couch (Phil Dawson kick), 12:55. Browns 7–0. Drive: 4 plays, 72 yards, 2:05.
- MIN – Moe Williams 4-yard run (Doug Brien kick), 4:58. Tied 7–7. Drive: 14 plays, 75 yards, 7:57.

Second quarter

- CLE – Phil Dawson 45-yard field goal, 10:11. Browns 10–7. Drive: 10 plays, 58 yards, 5:08.
- CLE – Phil Dawson 45-yard field goal, 0:03. Browns 13–7. Drive: 6 plays, 30 yards, 0:47.

Third quarter

- CLE – Kalvin Pearson 60-yard interception return (Phil Dawson kick), 10:46. Browns 20–7.
- CLE – Mark Campbell 5-yard pass from Kelly Holcomb (Jay Taylor kick), 7:12. Browns 27–7. Drive: 3 plays, 58 yards, 1:24.

Fourth quarter

- MIN – Bennitte Waddell fumble recovery in the end zone (Spergon Wynn–Matt Cercone pass), 2:37. Browns 27–15. Drive: 7 plays, 39 yards, 3:03.

Top passers

- CLE – Tim Couch – 7/9, 138 yards, TD
- MIN – Daunte Culpepper – 8/13, 66 yards

Top rushers

- CLE – Autry Denson – 8 rushes, 41 yards
- MIN – Moe Williams – 4 rushes, 19 yards, TD

Top receivers

- CLE – Jamel White – 3 receptions, 81 yards, TD
- MIN – O. J. Santiago – 2 receptions, 48 yards

==== Week 2: at Buffalo Bills ====
Week 2: Minnesota Vikings at Buffalo Bills – Game summary

Quarter	1	2	3	4	Total
Vikings	7	10	0	7	24
Bills	6	7	6	2	21

at Ralph Wilson Stadium, Orchard Park, New York

- Date: August 16
- Game time: 7:30 p.m. CDT
- Game weather: Partly cloudy, 79 °F (26 °C)
- Game attendance: 46,027
- Referee: Tom White (123)
- Recap, Game Book

Game information

First quarter

- BUF – Mike Hollis 25-yard field goal, 10:54. Bills 3–0. Drive: 4 plays, 6 yards, 1:25.
- MIN – Michael Bennett 3-yard run (Doug Brien kick), 9:29. Vikings 7–3. Drive: 3 plays, 55 yards, 1:25.
- BUF – Mike Hollis 20-yard field goal, 5:00. Vikings 7–6. Drive: 9 plays, 78 yards, 4:29.

Second quarter

- MIN – Byron Chamberlain 8-yard pass from Daunte Culpepper (Doug Brien kick), 13:43. Vikings 14–6. Drive: 12 plays, 86 yards, 6:17.
- BUF – Shawn Bryson 1-yard run (Mike Hollis kick), 9:23. Vikings 14–13. Drive: 7 plays, 53 yards, 4:20.
- MIN – Doug Brien 19-yard field goal, 3:58. Vikings 17–13. Drive: 10 plays, 68 yards, 5:25.

Third quarter

- BUF – Richard Huntley 5-yard run (kick failed, wide left), 10:35. Bills 19–17. Drive: 6 plays, 54 yards, 2:38.

Fourth quarter

- MIN – Kelly Campbell 25-yard pass from Shaun Hill (Todd France kick), 9:59. Vikings 24–19. Drive: 1 play, 25 yards, 0:07.
- BUF – Nick Murphy ran out of bounds in the end zone for a safety, 0:00. Vikings 24–19.

Top passers

- MIN – Daunte Culpepper – 12/19, 189 yards, TD
- BUF – Travis Brown – 10/22, 104 yards, INT

Top rushers

- MIN – Michael Bennett – 5 rushes, 49 yards, TD
- BUF – Travis Henry – 7 rushes, 50 yards

Top receivers

- MIN – Randy Moss – 4 receptions, 71 yards
- BUF – Peerless Price – 2 receptions, 49 yards

==== Week 3: vs. Tennessee Titans ====
Week 3: Tennessee Titans at Minnesota Vikings – Game summary

Quarter	1	2	3	4	Total
Titans	0	3	0	7	10
Vikings	0	14	0	0	14

at Hubert H. Humphrey Metrodome, Minneapolis, Minnesota

- Date: August 23
- Game time: 7:00 p.m. CDT
- Game weather: None (indoor stadium)
- Game attendance: 63,845
- Referee: Bernie Kukar (86)
- Recap, Game Book

Game information

First quarter

- No scoring plays.

Second quarter

- MIN – Daunte Culpepper 1-yard run (Doug Brien kick), 13:50. Vikings 7–0. Drive: 6 plays, 87 yards, 3:10.
- TEN – Joe Nedney 27-yard field goal, 5:52. Vikings 7–3. Drive: 8 plays, 31 yards, 3:39.
- MIN – Randy Moss 1-yard pass from Daunte Culpepper (Doug Brien kick), 1:00. Vikings 14–3. Drive: 10 plays, 75 yards, 4:52.

Third quarter

- No scoring plays.

Fourth quarter

- TEN – John Simon 8-yard pass from Billy Volek (Joe Nedney kick), 0:02. Vikings 14–10. Drive: 9 plays, 47 yards, 1:45.

Top passers

- TEN – Billy Volek – 15/23, 153 yards, TD, INT
- MIN – Daunte Culpepper – 10/15, 137 yards, TD

Top rushers

- TEN – Skip Hicks – 8 rushes, 21 yards
- MIN – James Wofford – 11 rushes, 52 yards

Top receivers

- TEN – Eddie Berlin – 5 receptions, 76 yards
- MIN – Randy Moss – 4 receptions, 76 yards, TD

==== Week 4: at Pittsburgh Steelers ====
Week 4: Minnesota Vikings at Pittsburgh Steelers – Game summary

Quarter	1	2	3	4	Total
Vikings	0	7	0	7	14
Steelers	7	7	3	0	17

at Heinz Field, Pittsburgh, Pennsylvania

- Date: August 29
- Game time: 7:35 p.m. CDT
- Game weather: Partly cloudy, 75 °F (24 °C)
- Game attendance: 57,062
- Referee: Tom White (123)
- Recap, Game Book

Game information

First quarter

- PIT – Jerome Bettis 2-yard run (Todd Peterson kick), 1:42. Steelers 7–0. Drive: 9 plays, 98 yards, 3:53.

Second quarter

- PIT – Amos Zereoué 1-yard run (Todd Peterson kick), 6:12. Steelers 14–0. Drive: 13 plays, 80 yards, 7:16.
- MIN – Randy Moss 5-yard pass from Daunte Culpepper (Doug Brien kick), 0:47. Steelers 14–7. Drive: 4 plays, 57 yards, 1:00.

Third quarter

- PIT – Todd Peterson 33-yard field goal, 9:26. Steelers 17–7. Drive: 7 plays, 32 yards, 3:24.

Fourth quarter

- MIN – Todd Bouman 3-yard run (Doug Brien kick), 4:57. Steelers 17–14. Drive: 8 plays, 62 yards, 3:40.

Top passers

- MIN – Daunte Culpepper – 10/16, 121 yards, TD
- PIT – Kordell Stewart – 7/12, 105 yards

Top rushers

- MIN – Doug Chapman – 11 rushes, 58 yards
- PIT – Antwon McCray – 16 rushes, 67 yards

Top receivers

- MIN – Randy Moss – 6 receptions, 85 yards, TD
- PIT – Plaxico Burress – 2 receptions, 47 yards

== Regular season ==
=== Schedule ===
Week	Date	Opponent	Result	Record	Venue	Attendance	NFL.com recap
1	September 8	at Chicago Bears	L 23–27	0–1	Memorial Stadium	52,168	Recap
2	September 15	Buffalo Bills	L 39–45 (OT)	0–2	Hubert H. Humphrey Metrodome	64,047	Recap
3	September 22	Carolina Panthers	L 14–21	0–3	Hubert H. Humphrey Metrodome	63,945	Recap
4	September 29	at Seattle Seahawks	L 23–48	0–4	Seahawks Stadium	65,212	Recap
5	Bye						
6	October 13	Detroit Lions	W 31–24	1–4	Hubert H. Humphrey Metrodome	64,013	Recap
7	October 20	at New York Jets	L 7–20	1–5	Giants Stadium	78,516	Recap
8	October 27	Chicago Bears	W 25–7	2–5	Hubert H. Humphrey Metrodome	64,122	Recap
9	November 3	at Tampa Bay Buccaneers	L 24–38	2–6	Raymond James Stadium	65,667	Recap
10	November 10	New York Giants	L 20–27	2–7	Hubert H. Humphrey Metrodome	64,005	Recap
11	November 17	Green Bay Packers	W 31–21	3–7	Hubert H. Humphrey Metrodome	64,153	Recap
12	November 24	at New England Patriots	L 17–24	3–8	Gillette Stadium	68,436	Recap
13	December 1	Atlanta Falcons	L 24–30 (OT)	3–9	Hubert H. Humphrey Metrodome	63,947	Recap
14	December 8	at Green Bay Packers	L 22–26	3–10	Lambeau Field	64,070	Recap
15	December 15	at New Orleans Saints	W 32–31	4–10	Louisiana Superdome	67,851	Recap
16	December 21	Miami Dolphins	W 20–17	5–10	Hubert H. Humphrey Metrodome	64,285	Recap
17	December 29	at Detroit Lions	W 38–36	6–10	Ford Field	60,233	Recap

=== Game summaries ===
==== Week 1: at Chicago Bears ====
Week 1: Minnesota Vikings at Chicago Bears – Game summary

Quarter	1	2	3	4	Total
Vikings	3	17	0	3	23
Bears	7	3	3	14	27

at Memorial Stadium, Champaign, Illinois

- Date: September 8
- Game time: 12:00 p.m. CDT
- Game weather: Partly cloudy, 85 °F (29 °C)
- Game attendance: 63,226
- Referee: Mike Carey (94)
- TV: FOX
- Recap, Game Book

Game information

First quarter

- MIN – Doug Brien 30-yard field goal, 6:15. Vikings 3–0. Drive: 7 plays, 44 yards, 3:18.
- CHI – Marty Booker 29-yard pass from Jim Miller (Paul Edinger kick), 1:03. Bears 7–3. Drive: 3 plays, 29 yards, 1:31.

Second quarter

- MIN – Daunte Culpepper 2-yard run (Doug Brien kick), 13:32. Vikings 10–7. Drive: 6 plays, 81 yards, 2:31.
- CHI – Paul Edinger 49-yard field goal, 9:19. Tied 10–10. Drive: 9 plays, 49 yards, 4:13.
- MIN – Doug Brien 22-yard field goal, 3:30. Vikings 13–10. Drive: 11 plays, 69 yards, 5:49.
- MIN – Randy Moss 33-yard pass from Daunte Culpepper (Doug Brien kick), 0:55. Vikings 20–10. Drive: 1 play, 33 yards, 0:06.

Third quarter

- CHI – Paul Edinger 49-yard field goal, 10:28. Vikings 20–13. Drive: 10 plays, 39 yards, 4:32.

Fourth quarter

- MIN – Doug Brien 42-yard field goal, 9:07. Vikings 23–13. Drive: 9 plays, 43 yards, 4:24.
- CHI – Anthony Thomas 1-yard run (Paul Edinger kick), 6:13. Vikings 23–20. Drive: 5 plays, 78 yards, 2:54.
- CHI – David Terrell 9-yard pass from Jim Miller (Paul Edinger kick), 0:28. Bears 27–23. Drive: 8 plays, 51 yards, 2:06.

Top passers

- MIN – Daunte Culpepper – 16/28, 234 yards, TD, 2 INT
- CHI – Jim Miller – 20/33, 297 yards, 2 TD, INT

Top rushers

- MIN – Michael Bennett – 16 rushes, 53 yards
- CHI – Anthony Thomas – 19 rushes, 45 yards, TD

Top receivers

- MIN – Randy Moss – 6 receptions, 58 yards, TD
- CHI – Marty Booker – 8 receptions, 198 yards, TD

==== Week 2: vs. Buffalo Bills ====
Week 2: Buffalo Bills at Minnesota Vikings – Game summary

Quarter	1	2	3	4	OT	Total
Bills	6	7	10	16	6	45
Vikings	3	10	13	13	0	39

at Hubert H. Humphrey Metrodome, Minneapolis, Minnesota

- Date: September 15
- Game time: 3:15 p.m. CDT/4:15 p.m. EDT
- Game weather: None (indoor stadium)
- Game attendance: 64,047
- Referee: Ron Winter (14)
- TV announcers (CBS): Gus Johnson and Brent Jones
- Recap, Game Book

Game information

First quarter

- MIN – Doug Brien 29-yard field goal, 7:32. Vikings 3–0. Drive: 11 plays, 53 yards, 4:30.
- BUF – Mike Hollis 52-yard field goal, 3:56. Tied 3–3. Drive: 8 plays, 46 yards, 3:36.
- BUF – Mike Hollis 20-yard field goal, 0:30. Bills 6–3. Drive: 6 plays, 25 yards, 2:25.

Second quarter

- MIN – Daunte Culpepper 2-yard run (Doug Brien kick), 8:54. Vikings 10–6. Drive: 11 plays, 72 yards, 6:36.
- MIN – Doug Brien 22-yard field goal, 2:13. Vikings 13–6. Drive: 12 plays, 69 yards, 4:54.
- BUF – Josh Reed 9-yard pass from Drew Bledsoe (Mike Hollis kick), 1:06. Tied 13–13. Drive: 6 plays, 82 yards, 1:07.

Third quarter

- MIN – Randy Moss 2-yard pass from Daunte Culpepper (Doug Brien kick), 13:36. Vikings 20–13. Drive: 2 plays, 3 yards, 0:40.
- BUF – Charlie Rogers 90-yard kickoff return (Mike Hollis kick), 13:24. Tied 20–20. Drive: 0 plays, 0 yards, 0:12.
- BUF – Mike Hollis 20-yard field goal, 6:14. Bills 23–20. Drive: 8 plays, 33 yards, 4:45.
- MIN – D'Wayne Bates 29-yard pass from Daunte Culpepper (kick failed, wide left), 1:30. Vikings 26–23. Drive: 8 plays, 63 yards, 4:44.

Fourth quarter

- BUF – Ron Edwards fumble recovery in the end zone (Mike Hollis kick), 14:01. Bills 30–26.
- MIN – Derrick Alexander 5-yard pass from Daunte Culpepper (kick failed), 7:27. Vikings 32–30. Drive: 13 plays, 82 yards, 6:34.
- BUF – Peerless Price 3-yard pass from Drew Bledsoe (pass failed), 3:08. Bills 36–32. Drive: 10 plays, 78 yards, 4:19.
- MIN – Moe Williams 2-yard run (Doug Brien kick), 0:26. Vikings 39–36. Drive: 10 plays, 60 yards, 2:42.
- BUF – Mike Hollis 54-yard field goal, 0:00. Tied 39–39. Drive: 4 plays, 29 yards, 0:26.

Overtime

- BUF – Peerless Price 48-yard pass from Drew Bledsoe, 4:48. Bills 45–39. Drive: 2 plays, 76 yards, 0:40.

Top passers

- BUF – Drew Bledsoe – 35/49, 463 yards, 3 TD
- MIN – Daunte Culpepper – 25/45, 281 yards, 3 TD

Top rushers

- BUF – Travis Henry – 12 rushes, 30 yards
- MIN – Moe Williams – 17 rushes, 102 yards, TD

Top receivers

- BUF – Peerless Price – 13 receptions, 185 yards, 2 TD
- MIN – Randy Moss – 11 receptions, 111 yards, TD

==== Week 3: vs. Carolina Panthers ====
Week 3: Carolina Panthers at Minnesota Vikings – Game summary

Quarter	1	2	3	4	Total
Panthers	0	0	7	14	21
Vikings	0	7	0	7	14

at Hubert H. Humphrey Metrodome, Minneapolis, Minnesota

- Date: September 22
- Game time: 12:00 p.m. CDT/1:00 p.m. EDT
- Game weather: None (indoor stadium)
- Game attendance: 63,945
- Referee: Bernie Kukar (86)
- Recap, Game Book

Game information

First quarter

- No scoring plays.

Second quarter

- MIN – Michael Bennett 1-yard run (Gary Anderson kick), 12:58. Vikings 7–0. Drive: 4 plays, 17 yards, 2:02.

Third quarter

- CAR – Steve Smith Sr. 14-yard pass from Rodney Peete (Jon Hilbert kick), 5:14. Tied 7–7. Drive: 2 plays, 28 yards, 0:47.

Fourth quarter

- CAR – Lamar Smith 12-yard run (Jon Hilbert kick), 13:28. Panthers 14–7. Drive: 6 plays, 80 yards, 3:38.
- CAR – Lamar Smith 24-yard run (Jon Hilbert kick), 7:54. Panthers 21–7. Drive: 8 plays, 48 yards, 4:42.
- MIN – Chris Walsh 4-yard pass from Daunte Culpepper (Gary Anderson kick), 3:29. Panthers 21–14. Drive: 9 plays, 89 yards, 4:25.

Top passers

- CAR – Rodney Peete – 20/30, 221 yards, TD, 2 INT
- MIN – Daunte Culpepper – 19/30, 191 yards, TD, 4 INT

Top rushers

- CAR – Lamar Smith – 30 rushes, 154 yards, 2 TD
- MIN – Daunte Culpepper – 4 rushes, 32 yards

Top receivers

- CAR – Steve Smith Sr. – 5 receptions, 81 yards, TD
- MIN – Moe Williams – 4 receptions, 66 yards

==== Week 4: at Seattle Seahawks ====
Week 4: Minnesota Vikings at Seattle Seahawks – Game summary

Quarter	1	2	3	4	Total
Vikings	7	3	7	6	23
Seahawks	14	31	0	3	48

at Seahawks Stadium, Seattle, Washington

- Date: September 29
- Game time: 7:35 p.m. CDT/5:35 p.m. PDT
- Game weather: Sunny, 59 °F (15 °C)
- Game attendance: 65,212
- Referee: Dick Hantak (105)
- Recap, Game Book

Game information

First quarter

- SEA – Shaun Alexander 2-yard run (Rian Lindell kick), 11:17. Seahawks 7–0. Drive: 11 plays, 74 yards, 3:43.
- SEA – Shaun Alexander 20-yard run (Rian Lindell kick), 7:24. Seahawks 14–0. Drive: 4 plays, 72 yards, 2:12.
- MIN – Daunte Culpepper 12-yard run (Gary Anderson kick), 1:49. Seahawks 14–7. Drive: 11 plays, 77 yards, 5:35.

Second quarter

- SEA – Rian Lindell 35-yard field goal, 11:46. Seahawks 17–7. Drive: 12 plays, 53 yards, 5:03.
- MIN – Gary Anderson 35-yard field goal, 3:13. Seahawks 17–10. Drive: 14 plays, 51 yards, 8:33.
- SEA – Shaun Alexander 80-yard pass from Trent Dilfer (Rian Lindell kick), 2:53. Seahawks 24–10. Drive: 1 play, 80 yards, 0:20.
- SEA – Shaun Alexander 3-yard run (Rian Lindell kick), 1:57. Seahawks 31–10. Drive: 3 plays, 29 yards, 0:50.
- SEA – Shaun Alexander 14-yard run (Rian Lindell kick), 1:48. Seahawks 38–10. Drive: 1 play, 14 yards, 0:04.
- SEA – Reggie Tongue 46-yard interception return (Rian Lindell kick), 1:06. Seahawks 45–10.

Third quarter

- MIN – Moe Williams 3-yard run (Gary Anderson kick), 12:07. Seahawks 45–17. Drive: 2 plays, 14 yards, 0:35.

Fourth quarter

- MIN – Moe Williams 5-yard run (run failed), 8:56. Seahawks 45–23. Drive: 11 plays, 55 yards, 4:04.
- SEA – Rian Lindell 21-yard field goal, 2:48. Seahawks 48–23. Drive: 10 plays, 47 yards, 6:08.

Top passers

- MIN – Daunte Culpepper – 29/53, 273 yards, 2 INT
- SEA – Trent Dilfer – 13/28, 222 yards, TD

Top rushers

- MIN – Michael Bennett – 15 rushes, 91 yards
- SEA – Shaun Alexander – 24 rushes, 139 yards, 4 TD

Top receivers

- MIN – Moe Williams – 7 receptions, 77 yards
- SEA – Shaun Alexander – 3 receptions, 92 yards, TD

==== Week 6: vs. Detroit Lions ====
Week 6: Detroit Lions at Minnesota Vikings – Game summary

Quarter	1	2	3	4	Total
Lions	14	7	3	0	24
Vikings	3	7	7	14	31

at Hubert H. Humphrey Metrodome, Minneapolis, Minnesota

- Date: October 13
- Game time: 12:00 pm CDT
- Game weather: None (indoor stadium)
- Game attendance: 64,013
- Referee: Larry Nemmers (20)
- TV: Fox
- Recap, Game Book

Game information

First quarter

- DET – Mikhael Ricks 41-yard pass from Joey Harrington (Jason Hanson kick), 10:50. Lions 7–0. Drive: 4 plays, 80 yards, 2:04.
- DET – Chris Claiborne 20-yard interception return (Jason Hanson kick), 9:39. Lions 14–0.
- MIN – Gary Anderson 42-yard field goal, 5:54. Lions 14–3. Drive: 7 plays, 25 yards, 3:45.

Second quarter

- MIN – Jim Kleinsasser 1-yard pass from Daunte Culpepper (Gary Anderson kick), 12:34. Lions 14–10. Drive: 10 plays, 79 yards, 5:21.
- DET – Az-Zahir Hakim 20-yard pass from Joey Harrington (Jason Hanson kick), 1:11. Lions 21–10. Drive: 6 plays, 80 yards, 3:10.

Third quarter

- MIN – Daunte Culpepper 7-yard run (Gary Anderson kick), 9:51. Lions 21–17. Drive: 7 plays, 59 yards, 4:03.
- DET – Jason Hanson 49-yard field goal, 6:07. Lions 24–17. Drive: 8 plays, 28 yards, 3:44.

Fourth quarter

- MIN – Michael Bennett 45-yard pass from Daunte Culpepper (Gary Anderson kick), 5:25. Tied 24–24. Drive: 7 plays, 90 yards, 3:24.
- MIN – Moe Williams 2-yard run (Gary Anderson kick), 2:12. Vikings 31–24. Drive: 5 plays, 48 yards, 2:00.

Top passers

- DET – Joey Harrington – 25/41, 309 yards, 2 TD, INT
- MIN – Daunte Culpepper – 27/36, 295 yards, 2 TD, INT

Top rushers

- DET – James Stewart – 10 rushes, 42 yards
- MIN – Michael Bennett – 16 rushes, 68 yards

Top receivers

- DET – Mikhael Ricks – 3 receptions, 79 yards, TD
- MIN – Randy Moss – 9 receptions, 83 yards

==== Week 7: at New York Jets ====
Week 7: Minnesota Vikings at New York Jets – Game summary

Quarter	1	2	3	4	Total
Vikings	0	0	0	7	7
Jets	3	7	7	3	20

at Giants Stadium, East Rutherford, New Jersey

- Date: October 20
- Game time: 12:00 p.m. CDT/1:00 p.m. EDT
- Game weather: Partly cloudy, 57 °F (14 °C)
- Game attendance: 78,516
- Referee: Mike Carey (94)
- TV: Fox
- Recap, Game Book

Game information

First quarter

- NYJ – John Hall 38-yard field goal, 7:33. Jets 3–0. Drive: 12 plays, 60 yards, 7:27.

Second quarter

- NYJ – Laveranues Coles 7-yard pass from Chad Pennington (John Hall kick), 2:28. Jets 10–0. Drive: 12 plays, 84 yards, 6:31.

Third quarter

- NYJ – Curtis Martin 5-yard run (John Hall kick), 7:07. Jets 17–0. Drive: 6 plays, 90 yards, 3:25.

Fourth quarter

- NYJ – John Hall 37-yard field goal, 6:19. Jets 20–0. Drive: 10 plays, 73 yards, 5:45.
- MIN – Moe Williams 1-yard run (Gary Anderson kick), 3:17. Jets 20–7. Drive: 9 plays, 72 yards, 3:13.

Top passers

- MIN – Daunte Culpepper – 26/39, 288 yards, 3 INT
- NYJ – Chad Pennington – 24/29, 324 yards, TD

Top rushers

- MIN – Michael Bennett – 12 rushes, 56 yards
- NYJ – Curtis Martin – 21 rushes, 70 yards, TD

Top receivers

- MIN – Randy Moss – 4 receptions, 86 yards
- NYJ – Santana Moss – 5 receptions, 111 yards

==== Week 8: vs. Chicago Bears ====
Week 8: Chicago Bears at Minnesota Vikings – Game summary

Quarter	1	2	3	4	Total
Bears	0	0	0	7	7
Vikings	0	13	12	0	25

at Hubert H. Humphrey Metrodome, Minneapolis, Minnesota

- Date: October 27
- Game time: 12:00 p.m. CST
- Game weather: None (indoor stadium)
- Game attendance: 64,122
- Referee: Bill Leavy (127)
- TV: FOX
- Recap, Game Book

Game information

First quarter

- No scoring plays.

Second quarter

- MIN – Gary Anderson 44-yard field goal, 8:51. Vikings 3–0. Drive: 12 plays, 57 yards, 6:09.
- MIN – Moe Williams 1-yard run (Gary Anderson kick), 1:42. Vikings 10–0. Drive: 11 plays, 57 yards, 5:47.
- MIN – Gary Anderson 24-yard field goal, 0:03. Vikings 13–0. Drive: 4 plays, 8 yards, 0:52.

Third quarter

- MIN – Randy Moss 39-yard pass from Daunte Culpepper (Gary Anderson kick), 10:19. Vikings 20–0. Drive: 5 plays, 66 yards, 2:38.
- MIN – Anthony Thomas tackled in the endzone by Fred Robbins and Nick Rogers for a safety, 7:13. Vikings 22–0.
- MIN – Gary Anderson 24-yard field goal, 1:24. Vikings 25–0. Drive: 11 plays, 53 yards, 5:49.

Fourth quarter

- CHI – Marty Booker 27-yard pass from Chris Chandler (Paul Edinger kick), 14:54. Vikings 25–7. Drive: 5 plays, 64 yards, 1:30.

Top passers

- CHI – Chris Chandler – 15/25, 176 yards, TD, INT
- MIN – Daunte Culpepper – 22/29, 216 yards, TD

Top rushers

- CHI – Henry Burris – 2 rushes, 19 yards
- MIN – Michael Bennett – 29 rushes, 106 yards

Top receivers

- CHI – Marty Booker – 4 receptions, 80 yards, TD
- MIN – Randy Moss – 9 receptions, 119 yards, TD

==== Week 9: at Tampa Bay Buccaneers ====
Week 9: Minnesota Vikings at Tampa Bay Buccaneers – Game summary

Quarter	1	2	3	4	Total
Vikings	0	10	7	7	24
Buccaneers	14	10	7	7	38

at Raymond James Stadium, Tampa, Florida

- Date: November 3
- Game time: 12:00 p.m. CST/1:00 p.m. EST
- Game weather: Partly cloudy, 77 °F (25 °C)
- Game attendance: 65,667
- Referee: Jeff Triplette (42)
- Recap, Game Book

Game information

First quarter

- TB – Karl Williams 15-yard pass from Brad Johnson (Martín Gramática kick), 13:12. Buccaneers 7–0. Drive: 3 plays, 21 yards, 1:41.
- TB – Rickey Dudley 2-yard pass from Brad Johnson (Martín Gramática kick), 1:03. Buccaneers 14–0. Drive: 12 plays, 86 yards, 6:09.

Second quarter

- TB – Martín Gramática 36-yard field goal, 12:19. Buccaneers 17–0. Drive: 6 plays, 30 yards, 2:41.
- TB – Keyshawn Johnson 2-yard pass from Brad Johnson (Martín Gramática kick), 7:16. Buccaneers 24–0. Drive: 5 plays, 84 yards, 1:52.
- MIN – Michael Bennett 85-yard run (Gary Anderson kick), 6:49. Buccaneers 24–7. Drive: 1 play, 75 yards, 0:27.
- MIN – Gary Anderson 26-yard field goal, 0:00. Buccaneers 24–10. Drive: 8 plays, 61 yards, 2:02.

Third quarter

- TB – Keyshawn Johnson 19-yard pass from Brad Johnson (Martín Gramática kick), 5:10. Buccaneers 31–10. Drive: 6 plays, 82 yards, 3:59.
- MIN – Moe Williams 1-yard run (Gary Anderson kick), 2:08. Buccaneers 31–17. Drive: 6 plays, 64 yards, 3:02.

Fourth quarter

- TB – Mike Alstott 5-yard pass from Brad Johnson (Martín Gramática kick), 13:34. Buccaneers 38–17. Drive: 6 plays, 46 yards, 3:17.
- MIN – Moe Williams 1-yard run (Gary Anderson kick), 4:40. Buccaneers 38–24. Drive: 11 plays, 88 yards, 5:43.

Top passers

- MIN – Daunte Culpepper – 18/29, 225 yards, 2 INT
- TB – Brad Johnson – 24/31, 313 yards, 5 TD

Top rushers

- MIN – Michael Bennett – 10 rushes, 114 yards, TD
- TB – Aaron Stecker – 1 rushes, 59 yards

Top receivers

- MIN – Jim Kleinsasser – 3 receptions, 64 yards
- TB – Keyshawn Johnson – 9 receptions, 133 yards, 2 TD

==== Week 10: vs. New York Giants ====
Week 10: New York Giants at Minnesota Vikings – Game summary

Quarter	1	2	3	4	Total
Giants	7	6	6	8	27
Vikings	0	3	3	14	20

at Hubert H. Humphrey Metrodome, Minneapolis, Minnesota

- Date: November 10
- Game time: 12:00 p.m. CST
- Game weather: None (indoor stadium)
- Game attendance: 64,122
- Referee: Tony Corrente (99)
- Recap, Game Book

Game information

First quarter

- NYG – Charles Stackhouse 1-yard pass from Kerry Collins (Matt Bryant kick), 6:10. Giants 7–0. Drive: 3 plays, 23 yards, 1:35.

Second quarter

- MIN – Gary Anderson 20-yard field goal, 12:36. Giants 7–3. Drive: 10 plays, 51 yards, 5:07.
- NYG – Ron Dayne 30-yard run (run failed), 8:48. Giants 13–3. Drive: 7 plays, 72 yards, 3:48.

Third quarter

- MIN – Gary Anderson 27-yard field goal, 9:11. Giants 13–6. Drive: 7 plays, 48 yards, 3:02.
- NYG – Amani Toomer 11-yard pass from Kerry Collins (kick failed, wide left), 0:22. Giants 19–6. Drive: 6 plays, 91 yards, 3:04.

Fourth quarter

- MIN – Moe Williams 1-yard run (Gary Anderson kick), 12:06. Giants 19–13. Drive: 3 plays, 81 yards, 1:11.
- MIN – Michael Bennett 78-yard run (Gary Anderson kick), 8:36. Vikings 20–19. Drive: 2 plays, 78 yards, 0:16.
- NYG – Tiki Barber 8-yard run (Kerry Collins–Marcellus Rivers pass), 2:43. Giants 27–20. Drive: 10 plays, 80 yards, 5:53.

Top passers

- NYG – Kerry Collins – 25/35, 300 yards, 2 TD, INT
- MIN – Daunte Culpepper – 9/20, 91 yards

Top rushers

- NYG – Tiki Barber – 24 rushes, 127 yards, TD
- MIN – Michael Bennett – 15 rushes, 167 yards, TD

Top receivers

- NYG – Ron Dixon – 4 receptions, 107 yards
- MIN – Randy Moss – 3 receptions, 85 yards

==== Week 11: vs. Green Bay Packers ====
Week 11: Green Bay Packers at Minnesota Vikings – Game summary

Quarter	1	2	3	4	Total
Packers	0	7	7	7	21
Vikings	14	0	7	10	31

at Hubert H. Humphrey Metrodome, Minneapolis, Minnesota

- Date: November 17
- Game time: 1:00 p.m.
- Game weather: None (indoor stadium)
- Game attendance: 64,153
- Referee: Ron Blum (7)
- TV: Fox
- Recap, Game Book

Game information

First quarter

- MIN – Randy Moss 24-yard pass from Daunte Culpepper (Gary Anderson kick), 12:32. Vikings 7–0. Drive: 5 plays, 79 yards, 2:28.
- MIN – D'Wayne Bates 18-yard pass from Daunte Culpepper (Gary Anderson kick), 6:51. Vikings 14–0. Drive: 6 plays, 65 yards, 3:20.

Second quarter

- GB – Ahman Green 1-yard run (Ryan Longwell kick), 0:43. Vikings 14–7. Drive: 8 plays, 63 yards, 3:04.

Third quarter

- MIN – Daunte Culpepper 1-yard run (Gary Anderson kick), 9:00. Vikings 21–7. Drive: 9 plays, 81 yards, 4:20.
- GB – Bubba Franks 1-yard pass from Brett Favre (Ryan Longwell kick), 5:36. Vikings 21–14. Drive: 8 plays, 72 yards, 3:24.

Fourth quarter

- GB – Donald Driver 84-yard pass from Brett Favre (Ryan Longwell kick), 11:53. Tied 21–21. Drive: 3 plays, 84 yards, 1:27.
- MIN – Gary Anderson 32-yard field goal, 7:16. Vikings 24–21. Drive: 7 plays, 19 yards, 4:37.
- MIN – Moe Williams 3-yard run (Gary Anderson kick), 1:56. Vikings 31–21. Drive: 6 plays, 80 yards, 2:24.

Top passers

- GB – Brett Favre – 24/43, 296 yards, 2 TD, 3 INT
- MIN – Daunte Culpepper – 13/26, 217 yards, 2 TD, 2 INT

Top rushers

- GB – Ahman Green – 18 rushes, 71 yards, TD
- MIN – Michael Bennett – 20 rushes, 130 yards

Top receivers

- GB – Donald Driver – 4 receptions, 121 yards, TD
- MIN – Randy Moss – 6 receptions, 115 yards, TD

==== Week 12: at New England Patriots ====
Week 12: Minnesota Vikings at New England Patriots – Game summary

Quarter	1	2	3	4	Total
Vikings	0	7	7	3	17
Patriots	7	14	0	3	24

at Gillette Stadium, Foxborough, Massachusetts

- Date: November 24
- Game time: 12:00 p.m. CDT/1:00 p.m. EDT
- Game weather: Partly cloudy, 49 °F (9 °C)
- Game attendance: 68,436
- Referee: Gerald Austin (34)
- TV: Fox
- Recap, Game Book

Game information

First quarter

- NE – Christian Fauria 9-yard pass from Tom Brady (Adam Vinatieri kick), 3:24. Patriots 7–0. Drive: 12 plays, 67 yards, 5:40.

Second quarter

- NE – Christian Fauria 1-yard pass from Tom Brady (Adam Vinatieri kick), 12:30. Patriots 14–0. Drive: 8 plays, 56 yards, 3:20.
- NE – Troy Brown 5-yard pass from Tom Brady (Adam Vinatieri kick), 8:02. Patriots 21–0. Drive: 7 plays, 29 yards, 4:01.
- MIN – D'Wayne Bates 6-yard pass from Daunte Culpepper (Gary Anderson kick), 0:19. Patriots 21–7. Drive: 5 plays, 61 yards, 0:50.

Third quarter

- MIN – Kelly Campbell 7-yard pass from Daunte Culpepper (Gary Anderson kick), 4:45. Patriots 21–14. Drive: 7 plays, 44 yards, 3:19.

Fourth quarter

- MIN – Gary Anderson 38-yard field goal, 14:42. Patriots 21–17. Drive: 9 plays, 56 yards, 3:16.
- NE – Adam Vinatieri 34-yard field goal, 11:09. Patriots 24–17. Drive: 7 plays, 56 yards, 3:33.

Top passers

- MIN – Daunte Culpepper – 24/49, 272 yards, 2 TD
- NE – Tom Brady – 21/34, 239 yards, 3 TD

Top rushers

- MIN – Daunte Culpepper – 5 rushes, 59 yards
- NE – Antowain Smith – 18 rushes, 58 yards

Top receivers

- MIN – Randy Moss – 8 receptions, 92 yards
- NE – David Patten – 5 receptions, 62 yards

==== Week 13: vs. Atlanta Falcons ====
Week 13: Atlanta Falcons at Minnesota Vikings – Game summary

Quarter	1	2	3	4	OT	Total
Falcons	0	14	7	3	6	30
Vikings	7	7	7	3	0	24

at Hubert H. Humphrey Metrodome, Minneapolis, Minnesota

- Date: December 1
- Game time: 12:00 p.m. CDT
- Game weather: None (indoor stadium)
- Game attendance: 63,947
- Referee: Ed Hochuli (85)
- Recap, Game Book

Game information

First quarter

- MIN – Daunte Culpepper 1-yard run (Gary Anderson kick), 9:38. Vikings 7–0. Drive: 11 plays, 75 yards, 5:22.

Second quarter

- ATL – Bob Christian 1-yard run (Jay Feely kick), 12:48. Tied 7–7. Drive: 2 plays, 40 yards, 0:21.
- MIN – Hunter Goodwin 2-yard pass from Daunte Culpepper (Gary Anderson kick), 2:40. Vikings 14–7. Drive: 7 plays, 36 yards, 3:25.
- ATL – Brian Finneran 39-yard pass from Michael Vick (Jay Feely kick), 0:37. Tied 14–14. Drive: 6 plays, 77 yards, 2:03.

Third quarter

- MIN – Michael Bennett 1-yard run (Gary Anderson kick), 3:19. Vikings 21–14. Drive: 5 plays, 41 yards, 2:40.
- ATL – Michael Vick 28-yard run (Jay Feely kick), 1:00. Tied 21–21. Drive: 5 plays, 76 yards, 2:19.

Fourth quarter

- ATL – Jay Feely 44-yard field goal, 3:33. Falcons 24–21. Drive: 8 plays, 29 yards, 3:53.
- MIN – Gary Anderson 29-yard field goal, 0:11. Tied 24–24. Drive: 10 plays, 55 yards, 3:22.

Overtime

- ATL – Michael Vick 46-yard run, 12:35. Falcons 30–24. Drive: 2 plays, 48 yards, 0:51.

Top passers

- ATL – Michael Vick – 11/28, 173 yards, TD, INT
- MIN – Daunte Culpepper – 23/43, 266 yards, 1 TD, 3 INT

Top rushers

- ATL – Michael Vick – 10 rushes, 173 yards, 2 TD
- MIN – Michael Bennett – 18 rushes, 86 yards, TD

Top receivers

- ATL – Brian Finneran – 5 receptions, 114 yards, TD
- MIN – Randy Moss – 9 receptions, 134 yards

==== Week 14: at Green Bay Packers ====
Week 14: Minnesota Vikings at Green Bay Packers – Game summary

Quarter	1	2	3	4	Total
Vikings	10	3	9	0	22
Packers	0	6	7	13	26

at Lambeau Field, Green Bay, Wisconsin

- Date: December 8
- Game time: 8:35 p.m.
- Game weather: Clear skies, 11 °F (−12 °C)
- Game attendance: 64,070
- Referee: Walt Coleman (65)
- TV announcers (ESPN): Mike Patrick, Joe Theismann and Suzy Kolber
- Recap, Game Book

Game information

First quarter

- MIN – Gary Anderson 23-yard field goal, 6:16. Vikings 10–0. Drive: 12 plays, 65 yards, 6:50.
- MIN – Randy Moss 3-yard pass from Daunte Culpepper (Gary Anderson kick), 1:02. Vikings 10–0. Drive: 4 plays, 30 yards, 2:00.

Second quarter

- MIN – Gary Anderson 22-yard field goal, 12:55. Vikings 13–0. Drive: 6 plays, 19 yards, 2:05.
- GB – Ryan Longwell 33-yard field goal, 6:43. Vikings 13–3. Drive: 11 plays, 59 yards, 6:12.
- GB – Ryan Longwell 19-yard field goal, 0:00. Vikings 13–6. Drive: 12 plays, 51 yards, 5:22.

Third quarter

- MIN – Daunte Culpepper 3-yard run (kick blocked), 11:29. Vikings 19–6. Drive: 7 plays, 74 yards, 3:31.
- GB – Robert Ferguson 21-yard pass from Brett Favre (Ryan Longwell kick), 7:57. Vikings 19–13. Drive: 8 plays, 67 yards, 3:32.
- MIN – Gary Anderson 37-yard field goal, 6:00. Vikings 22–13. Drive: 6 plays, 41 yards, 1:57.

Fourth quarter

- GB – Robert Ferguson 40-yard pass from Brett Favre (Ryan Longwell kick), 10:48. Vikings 22–20. Drive: 6 plays, 54 yards, 2:36.
- GB – Tony Fisher 14-yard run (run failed), 1:06. Packers 26–22. Drive: 9 plays, 85 yards, 3:26.

Top passers

- MIN – Daunte Culpepper – 15/28, 136 yards, TD, INT
- GB – Brett Favre – 22/32, 214 yards, 2 TD, INT

Top rushers

- MIN – Michael Bennett – 19 rushes, 120 yards
- GB – Tony Fisher – 25 rushes, 96 yards, TD

Top receivers

- MIN – D'Wayne Bates – 5 receptions, 71 yards
- GB – Robert Ferguson – 6 receptions, 105 yards, 2 TD

Players from both teams were involved in a massive brawl following a game-sealing interception by Daunte Culpepper.

==== Week 15: at New Orleans Saints ====
Week 15: Minnesota Vikings at New Orleans Saints – Game summary

Quarter	1	2	3	4	Total
Vikings	14	10	0	8	32
Saints	10	10	3	8	31

at Louisiana Superdome, New Orleans, Louisiana

- Date: December 15
- Game time: 12:00 p.m. CDT
- Game weather: None (indoor stadium)
- Game attendance: 67,851
- Referee: Bob McElwee (95)
- Recap, Game Book

Game information

First quarter

- NO – John Carney 40-yard field goal, 11:50. Saints 3–0. Drive: 5 plays, 17 yards, 3:10.
- MIN – Daunte Culpepper 4-yard run (Gary Anderson kick), 8:21. Vikings 7–3. Drive: 6 plays, 69 yards, 3:29.
- MIN – Daunte Culpepper 6-yard run (Gary Anderson kick), 1:01. Vikings 14–3. Drive: 11 plays, 71 yards, 5:42.
- NO – Michael Lewis 97-yard kickoff return (John Carney kick), 0:48. Vikings 14–10. Drive: 0 plays, 0 yards, 0:13.

Second quarter

- MIN – Gary Anderson 41-yard field goal, 11:59. Vikings 17–10. Drive: 9 plays, 57 yards, 3:49.
- NO – John Carney 34-yard field goal, 5:25. Vikings 17–13. Drive: 12 plays, 44 yards, 6:34.
- NO – Jake Reed 35-yard pass from Aaron Brooks (John Carney kick), 0:53. Saints 20–17. Drive: 8 plays, 65 yards, 1:28.
- MIN – Randy Moss 33-yard pass from Daunte Culpepper (Gary Anderson kick), 0:12. Vikings 24–20. Drive: 5 plays, 80 yards, 0:41.

Third quarter

- NO – John Carney 27-yard field goal, 0:55. Vikings 24–23. Drive: 14 plays, 75 yards, 8:06.

Fourth quarter

- NO – Deuce McAllister 17-yard pass from Aaron Brooks (Aaron Brooks–Joe Horn pass), 5:21. Saints 31–24. Drive: 9 plays, 74 yards, 4:35.
- MIN – Randy Moss 13-yard pass from Daunte Culpepper (Daunte Culpepper run), 0:05. Vikings 32–31. Drive: 13 plays, 73 yards, 5:16.

Top passers

- MIN – Daunte Culpepper – 26/36, 312 yards, 2 TD
- NO – Aaron Brooks – 21/33, 255 yards, 2 TD

Top rushers

- MIN – Daunte Culpepper – 7 rushes, 73 yards, 2 TD
- NO – Deuce McAllister – 18 rushes, 69 yards

Top receivers

- MIN – Randy Moss – 11 receptions, 113 yards, 2 TD
- NO – Joe Horn – 5 receptions, 60 yards

==== Week 16: vs. Miami Dolphins ====
Week 16: Miami Dolphins at Minnesota Vikings – Game summary

Quarter	1	2	3	4	Total
Dolphins	7	0	7	3	17
Vikings	0	3	7	10	20

at Hubert H. Humphrey Metrodome, Minneapolis, Minnesota

- Date: December 21
- Game time: 12:30 p.m. CST/1:30 p.m. EST
- Game weather: None (indoor stadium)
- Game attendance: 64,285
- Referee: Johnny Grier (23)
- TV: CBS
- Recap, Game Book

Game information

First quarter

- MIA – Chris Chambers 59-yard pass from Jay Fiedler (Olindo Mare kick), 11:43. Dolphins 7–0. Drive: 5 plays, 80 yards, 3:17.

Second quarter

- MIN – Gary Anderson 35-yard field goal, 4:21. Dolphins 7–3. Drive: 12 plays, 58 yards, 5:55.

Third quarter

- MIN – Moe Williams 3-yard run (Gary Anderson kick), 7:45. Vikings 10–7. Drive: 13 plays, 78 yards, 7:15.
- MIA – Jed Weaver 3-yard pass from Jay Fiedler (Olindo Mare kick), 1:19. Dolphins 14-10. Drive: 10 plays, 56 yards, 6:26.

Fourth quarter

- MIN – D'Wayne Bates 13-yard pass from Randy Moss (Gary Anderson kick), 11:53. Vikings 17–14. Drive: 9 plays, 80 yards, 4:26.
- MIA – Olindo Mare 25-yard field goal, 6:09. Tied 17–17. Drive: 10 plays, 45 yards, 5:44.
- MIN – Gary Anderson 53-yard field goal, 0:17. Vikings 20–17. Drive: 12 plays, 45 plays, 5:52.

Top passers

- MIA – Jay Fiedler – 15/21, 177 yards, 2 TD, INT
- MIN – Daunte Culpepper – 20/29, 244 yards, 2 INT

Top rushers

- MIA – Ricky Williams – 15 rushes, 67 yards
- MIN – Daunte Culpepper – 10 rushes, 67 yards

Top receivers

- MIA – Chris Chambers – 2 receptions, 68 yards, TD
- MIN – Randy Moss – 7 receptions, 110 yards

==== Week 17: at Detroit Lions ====
Week 17: Minnesota Vikings at Detroit Lions – Game summary

Quarter	1	2	3	4	Total
Vikings	14	14	7	3	38
Lions	14	3	7	12	36

at Ford Field, Detroit, Michigan

- Date: December 29
- Game time: 12:00 p.m. CST/1:00 p.m. EST
- Game weather: None (indoor stadium)
- Game attendance: 60,233
- Referee: Bill Carollo (63)
- Recap, Game Book

Game information

First quarter

- DET – Aveion Cason 23-yard pass from Mike McMahon (Jason Hanson kick), 11:56. Lions 7–0. Drive: 7 plays, 61 yards, 3:04.
- MIN – Daunte Culpepper 2-yard run (Gary Anderson kick), 3:53. Tied 7–7. Drive: 14 plays, 69 yards, 8:03.
- MIN – Corey Chavous 43-yard interception return (Gary Anderson kick), 3:00. Vikings 14–7.
- DET – Bill Schroeder 16-yard pass from Mike McMahon (Jason Hanson kick), 0:08. Tied 14–14. Drive: 6 plays, 71 yards, 2:52.

Second quarter

- MIN – Michael Bennett 2-yard run (Gary Anderson kick), 11:49. Vikings 21–14. Drive: 6 plays, 78 yards, 3:19.
- MIN – Kelly Campbell 10-yard pass from Daunte Culpepper (Gary Anderson kick), 5:54. Vikings 28–14. Drive: 5 plays, 84 yards, 2:22.
- DET – Jason Hanson 37-yard field goal, 1:50. Vikings 28–17. Drive: 9 plays, 43 yards, 4:04.

Third quarter

- DET – Robert Porcher fumble recovery in the end zone (Jason Hanson kick), 5:41. Vikings 28–24.
- MIN – Kelly Campbell 27-yard pass from Daunte Culpepper (Gary Anderson kick), 0:58. Vikings 35–24. Drive: 7 plays, 73 yards, 4:43.

Fourth quarter

- DET – Todd Lyght 75-yard return of blocked field goal (pass failed), 10:56. Vikings 35–30.
- MIN – Gary Anderson 18-yard field goal, 1:09. Vikings 38–30. Drive: 13 plays, 72 yards, 6:40.
- DET – Scotty Anderson 20-yard pass from Mike McMahon (pass failed), 0:13. Vikings 38–36. Drive: 7 plays, 61 yards, 0:56.

Top passers

- MIN – Daunte Culpepper – 21/29, 312 yards, 2 TD, INT
- DET – Mike McMahon – 19/44, 293 yards, 3 TD, 3 INT

Top rushers

- MIN – Michael Bennett – 19 rushes, 82 yards, TD
- DET – Mike McMahon – 3 rushes, 43 yards

Top receivers

- MIN – Randy Moss – 6 receptions, 109 yards
- DET – Bill Schroeder – 6 receptions, 132 yards, TD

=== Standings ===
==== Division ====
NFC North
	W	L	T	PCT	DIV	CONF	PF	PA	STK
^{(3)} Green Bay Packers	12	4	0	.750	5–1	9–3	398	328	L1
Minnesota Vikings	6	10	0	.375	4–2	5–7	390	442	W3
Chicago Bears	4	12	0	.250	2–4	3–9	281	379	L2
Detroit Lions	3	13	0	.188	1–5	3–9	306	451	L8

==== Conference ====
NFC
#	Team	Division	W	L	T	PCT	DIV	CONF	SOS	SOV
Division leaders
1 (Note: Philadelphia finished ahead of Tampa Bay and Green Bay based on conference record (11–1 vs 9–3/9–3).)	Philadelphia Eagles	East	12	4	0	.750	5–1	11–1	.469	.432
2 (Note: Tampa Bay finished ahead of Green Bay based on head-to-head victory.)	Tampa Bay Buccaneers	South	12	4	0	.750	4–2	9–3	.482	.432
3	Green Bay Packers	North	12	4	0	.750	5–1	9–3	.451	.414
4	San Francisco 49ers	West	10	6	0	.625	5–1	8–4	.504	.450
Wild Cards
5	New York Giants	East	10	6	0	.625	5–1	8–4	.482	.450
6	Atlanta Falcons	South	9	6	1	.594	4–2	7–5	.494	.429
Did not qualify for the postseason
7	New Orleans Saints	South	9	7	0	.563	3–3	7–5	.498	.566
8 (Note: St. Louis finished ahead of Seattle based on division record (4–2 to 2–4).)	St. Louis Rams	West	7	9	0	.438	4–2	5–7	.508	.446
9	Seattle Seahawks	West	7	9	0	.438	2–4	5–7	.506	.433
10 (Note: Washington finished ahead of Carolina based on common games (2–3 to 1–4))	Washington Redskins	East	7	9	0	.438	1–5	4–8	.527	.438
11	Carolina Panthers	South	7	9	0	.438	1–5	4–8	.486	.357
12	Minnesota Vikings	North	6	10	0	.375	4–2	5–7	.498	.417
13 (Note: Arizona finished ahead of Dallas based on head-to-head victory.)	Arizona Cardinals	West	5	11	0	.313	1–5	5–7	.500	.400
14	Dallas Cowboys	East	5	11	0	.313	1–5	3–9	.500	.475
15	Chicago Bears	North	4	12	0	.250	2–4	3–9	.521	.430
16	Detroit Lions	North	3	13	0	.188	1–5	3–9	.494	.375
Tiebreakers (Note: When breaking ties for three or more teams under the NFL's rules, they are first broken within divisions, then comparing only the highest-ranked remaining team from each division.)

== Statistics ==
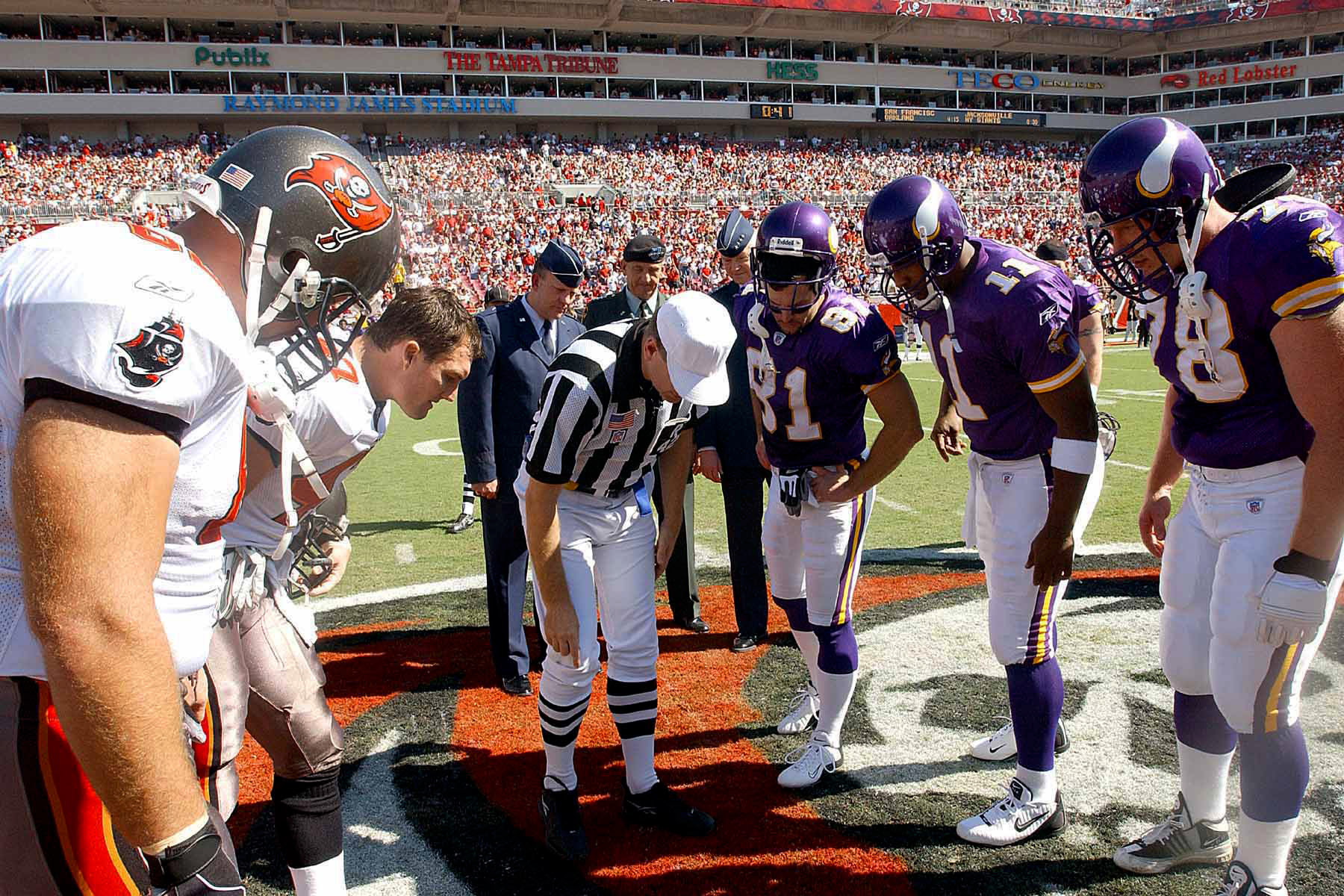
Coin flip before Minnesota's game at Tampa Bay Buccaneers in week 9, November 3

=== Team leaders ===
Category	Player(s)	Value
Passing yards	Daunte Culpepper	3,853
Passing touchdowns	Daunte Culpepper	18
Rushing yards	Michael Bennett	1,296
Rushing touchdowns	Moe Williams	11
Receiving yards	Randy Moss	1,347
Receiving touchdowns	Randy Moss	7
Points	Gary Anderson	90
Kickoff return yards	Moe Williams	516
Punt return yards	Nick Davis	190
Tackles	Greg Biekert	101
Sacks	Lance Johnstone	7
Interceptions	Greg Biekert	4
Forced fumbles	Nick Rogers	3

=== League rankings ===
Category	Total yards	Yards per game	NFL rank (out of 32)
Passing offense	3,685	230.3	9th
Rushing offense	2,507	156.7	1st
Total offense	6,192	387.0	2nd
Passing defense	4,103	256.4	29th
Rushing defense	1,666	104.1	10th
Total defense	5,769	360.6	26th
