= 2002 Washington Redskins season =

NFL team season

- Owner: Daniel Snyder
- General manager: Vinny Cerrato
- Head coach: Steve Spurrier
- Home stadium: FedExField

Results
- Record: 7–9
- Division place: 3rd NFC East
- Playoffs: Did not qualify
- All-Pros: None
- Pro Bowlers: T Chris Samuels; LB LaVar Arrington; CB Champ Bailey

The 2002 season was the Washington Redskins' 71st season in the National Football League, and their 66th representing Washington, D.C. They failed to improve on their 8–8 record from 2001, finishing at 7–9. For cornerback Darrell Green, this was his 20th and final season with the team. In honor of the team's 70th anniversary, their home uniforms for the season were based on their 1969 home uniforms.

== Offseason ==
=== NFL draft ===
2002 Washington Redskins draft
Round	Pick	Player	Position	College	Notes
1	32	Patrick Ramsey	Quarterback	Tulane	from New England
2	56	Ladell Betts	Running back	Iowa	from Baltimore
3	79	Rashad Bauman	Cornerback	Oregon	from Cleveland via Jacksonville
3	87	Cliff Russell	Wide receiver	Utah	from Baltimore
5	159	Andre Lott	Strong safety	Tennessee	from Baltimore
5	160	Robert Royal	Tight end	LSU	from N.Y. Jets
6	192	Reggie Coleman	Offensive tackle	Tennessee	
7	230	Jeff Grau	Center	UCLA	
7	234	Greg Scott	Defensive end	Hampton	from N.Y. Jets via New England
7	257	Rock Cartwright	Running back	Kansas State	
Made roster * Made at least one Pro Bowl during career

=== Undrafted free agents ===
2002 undrafted free agents of note
Player	Position	College
Bernard Jackson	Defensive end	Tennessee
Ricot Joseph	Safety	Central Florida

== Personnel ==
=== Staff ===
2002 Washington Redskins staff
Front office: Owner – Daniel Snyder; Vice president of football operations – Joe Mendes; Vice president of football operations – Pepper Rodgers; Assistant general manager – Bobby Mitchell; Director of player personnel – Vinny Cerrato; Head coaches: Head coach – Steve Spurrier; Assistant head coach/defensive coordinator – Marvin Lewis; Offensive coaches: Assistant offensive coordinator/offensive line – Kim Helton; Assistant quarterbacks – Noah Brindise; Running backs – Hue Jackson; Wide receivers – Steve Spurrier Jr.; Tight ends – Lawson Holland; Assistant offensive line – John Hunt; Offensive assistant/quality control – Paul Guenther	Defensive coaches: Assistant defensive coordinator/linebackers – George Edwards; Defensive line – Ricky Hunley; Assistant defensive line/quality control – DeChon Burns; Defensive backs – George Catavolos; Assistant defensive backs – Kirk Olivadotti; Special teams coaches: Special teams – Mike Stock; Assistant special teams/assistant linebackers – Jim Collins; Strength and conditioning: Strength and conditioning – Chip Morton; Assistant strength and conditioning – John Hastings

=== Roster ===
2002 Washington Redskins roster
Quarterbacks (QB): 6 Shane Matthews; 11 Patrick Ramsey; 17 Danny Wuerffel; Running backs (RB): 46 Ladell Betts; 40 Rock Cartwright; 48 Stephen Davis; 38 Robert Gillespie; 47 Bryan Johnson FB; 32 Kenny Watson; Wide receivers (WR): 84 Chris Doering; 83 Richmond Flowers; 87 Rod Gardner; 85 Darnerien McCants; 80 Justin Skaggs; 88 Derrius Thompson; Tight ends (TE): 89 Zeron Flemister; 86 Walter Rasby; 49 Leonard Stephens	Offensive linemen (OL): 59 Wilbert Brown G; 62 Pat Downey C; 76 Jon Jansen T; 77 Tre' Johnson G; 64 David Loverne G; 50 Larry Moore C; 60 Chris Samuels T; 75 Alex Sulfsted G/T; 70 Kipp Vickers G; Defensive linemen (DL): 91 Delbert Cowsette DT; 92 Daryl Gardener DT; 73 Bernard Jackson DE; 72 Carl Powell DT; 96 Greg Scott DE; 78 Bruce Smith DE; 97 Renaldo Wynn DE	Linebackers (LB): 98 Jessie Armstead OLB; 56 LaVar Arrington OLB; 57 Orantes Grant MLB; 52 Lemar Marshall OLB; 53 Eddie Mason OLB; 55 Kevin Mitchell MLB; 58 Antonio Pierce OLB; Defensive backs (DB): 24 Champ Bailey CB; 25 Rashad Bauman CB; 29 Todd Franz SS; 28 Darrell Green CB; 35 Ricot Joseph SS; 34 Andre Lott CB/S; 26 Ifeanyi Ohalete SS; 21 Fred Smoot CB; 31 David Terrell FS; Special teams (ST): 67 Ethan Albright LS; 8 José Cortez K; 10 Craig Jarrett P	Practice squad: 51 Shamar Finney LB; -- Stephen Gibson OL; 15 Chris Greisen QB; -- DeAngelo Lloyd DE; 79 Akil Smith G; Reserve: 4 Bryan Barker P (IR); 23 Bruce Branch CB (IR); 71 Santana Dotson DT (IR); 94 LaDairis Jackson DE (IR); 61 Rod Jones T (IR); 45 Robert Royal TE (IR); 82 Cliff Russell WR (IR); 29 Sam Shade S (IR); 66 Brenden Stai T (IR); 54 Jeremiah Trotter LB (IR); 95 Dan Wilkinson DT (IR); Rookies in italics 53 active, 11 reserve, 5 practice squad

== Regular season ==
=== Schedule ===
Week	Date	Opponent	Result	Record	Venue	Attendance
1	September 8	Arizona Cardinals	W 31–23	1–0	FedExField	85,140
2	September 16	Philadelphia Eagles	L 7–37	1–1	FedExField	84,982
3	September 22	at San Francisco 49ers	L 10–20	1–2	3Com Park	67,541
4	Bye					
5	October 6	at Tennessee Titans	W 31–14	2–2	Adelphia Coliseum	68,804
6	October 13	New Orleans Saints	L 27–43	2–3	FedExField	80,768
7	October 20	at Green Bay Packers	L 9–30	2–4	Lambeau Field	63,363
8	October 27	Indianapolis Colts	W 26–21	3–4	FedExField	80,169
9	November 3	at Seattle Seahawks	W 14–3	4–4	Seahawks Stadium	64,325
10	November 10	at Jacksonville Jaguars	L 7–26	4–5	Alltel Stadium	66,665
11	November 17	at New York Giants	L 17–19	4–6	Giants Stadium	78,727
12	November 24	St. Louis Rams	W 20–17	5–6	FedExField	79,823
13	November 28	at Dallas Cowboys	L 20–27	5–7	Texas Stadium	63,606
14	December 8	New York Giants	L 21–27	5–8	FedExField	78,635
15	December 15	at Philadelphia Eagles	L 21–34	5–9	Veterans Stadium	65,615
16	December 22	Houston Texans	W 26–10	6–9	FedExField	70,291
17	December 29	Dallas Cowboys	W 20–14	7–9	FedExField	84,142

=== Game summaries ===
==== Week 1 vs. Arizona Cardinals ====
Week 1: Arizona Cardinals at Washington Redskins – Game summary

Quarter	1	2	3	4	Total
Cardinals	10	3	3	7	23
Redskins	3	7	14	7	31

at FedEx Field, Landover, Maryland

- Date: September 8
- Game time: 1:05 p.m. EST/11:05 a.m. MST
- Game weather: 76 °F (24 °C)
- Game attendance: 85,140
- Referee: Tom White
- TV announcers (FOX): Pat Summerall, Brian Baldinger, Dave Feldman
- Box Score

Game information

First quarter

- WAS – Brett Conway 35-yard field goal, 8:41. Redskins 3–0.
- ARI – Bill Gramática 36-yard field goal, 2:59. Tied 3–3.
- ARI – Jake Plummer 7-yard run (Bill Gramática kick), 0:10. Cardinals 10–3.

Second quarter

- WAS – Kevin Lockett 26-yard pass from Shane Matthews (Brett Conway kick), 10:10. Tied 10–10.
- ARI – Bill Gramática 20-yard field goal, 3:13. Cardinals 13–10.

Third quarter

- WAS – Stephen Davis 3-yard run (Brett Conway kick), 9:51. Redskins 17–13.
- ARI – Bill Gramática 39-yard field goal, 8:14. Redskins 17–16.
- WAS – Rod Gardner 43-yard pass from Shane Matthews (Brett Conway kick), 6:28. Redskins 24–16.

Fourth quarter

- WAS – Derrius Thompson 17-yard pass from Shane Matthews (Brett Conway kick), 12:08. Redskins 31–16.
- ARI – David Boston 29-yard pass from Jake Plummer (Bill Gramática kick), 10:39. Redskins 31–23.

Top passers

- ARI – Jake Plummer – 14/36, 187 yards, TD, INT
- WAS – Shane Matthews – 28/40, 327 yards, 3 TD, INT

Top rushers

- ARI – Thomas Jones – 17 rushes, 54 yards
- WAS – Stephen Davis – 26 rushes, 104 yards, TD

Top receivers

- ARI – David Boston – 7 receptions, 138 yards, TD
- WAS – Rod Gardner – 7 receptions, 131 yards, TD

Team – pass – rush – total – to

- ARI – 187 – 70 – 257 – 1
- WAS – 327 – 122 – 442 – 1

The Redskins hosted their now-former division foe in the Cardinals’ first season in the revamped NFC West. In Steve Spurrier’s debut as Skins coach his “Fun & Gun” offense put up 442 yards in a 31–23 win. Shane Matthews erupted to three touchdowns while Jake Plummer of the Cardinals was held to just fourteen completions.

==== Monday Night Football vs. Philadelphia Eagles ====
Spurrier's “Fun & Gun” was hammered 37-7 as Matthews completed just ten passes and Danny Wuerffel was sacked four times. At one point the exasperated Spurrier was caught on ABC cameras flapping his gums, a scene replayed in slow motion. This game also featured a delay into the fourth quarter when Pepper Spray that was used to break up fighting in the stands spread out onto the Eagles sideline.

==== Week 7: at Green Bay Packers ====
Week 7: Washington Redskins at Green Bay Packers

Quarter	1	2	3	4	Total
Redskins	3	3	3	0	9
Packers	7	10	0	13	30

at Lambeau Field, Green Bay, Wisconsin

- Date: October 20, 2002
- Game time: 4:15 p.m.
- Game weather: Partly cloudy, 44 °F (7 °C)
- Game attendance: 63,363
- Referee: Jeff Triplette (42)
- TV: Fox
- Recap, Game Book

Game information

First quarter

- WAS – James Tuthill 25-yard field goal, 8:50. Redskins 3–0. Drive: 12 plays, 64 yards, 6:10.
- GB – Ahman Green 24-yard run (Ryan Longwell kick), 4:21. Packers 7–3. Drive: 8 plays, 69 yards, 4:29.

Second quarter

- WAS – James Tuthill 53-yard field goal, 7:57. Packers 7–6. Drive: 12 plays, 40 yards, 5:23.
- GB – Ahman Green 2-yard run (Ryan Longwell kick), 5:07. Packers 14–6. Drive: 5 plays, 73 yards, 2:50.
- GB – Ryan Longwell 36-yard field goal, 1:23. Packers 17–6. Drive: 5 plays, 37 yards, 2:03.

Third quarter

- WAS – James Tuthill 31-yard field goal, 5:55. Packers 17–9. Drive: 8 plays, 38 yards, 4:28.

Fourth quarter

- GB – Ryan Longwell 41-yard field goal, 9:21. Packers 20–9. Drive: 7 plays, 16 yards, 3:31.
- GB – Ahman Green 8-yard run (Ryan Longwell kick), 7:48. Packers 27–9. Drive: 3 plays, 23 yards, 1:14.
- GB – Ryan Longwell 28-yard field goal, 0:22. Packers 30–9. Drive: 9 plays, 27 yards, 5:36.

Top passers

- WAS – Patrick Ramsey – 10/24, 135 yards
- GB – Brett Favre – 11/14, 89 yards

Top rushers

- WAS – Stephen Davis – 24 rushes, 91 yards
- GB – Ahman Green – 24 rushes, 88 yards, 3 TD

Top receivers

- WAS – Derrius Thompson – 5 receptions, 89 yards
- GB – Donald Driver – 4 receptions, 44 yards

==== Week 9: at Seattle Seahawks ====
Week 9: Washington Redskins (3–4) at Seattle Seahawks (2–5) – Game summary

Quarter	1	2	3	4	Total
Redskins	7	7	0	0	14
Seahawks	0	3	0	0	3

at Seahawks Stadium, Seattle

- Date: November 3
- Game time: 1:15pm local
- Game weather: clear, 49 °F (9 °C), 43% humidity, wind N 3 miles per hour (4.8 km/h)
- Game attendance: 64,325
- Referee: Ed Hochuli
- TV announcers (Fox): Sam Rosen, Bill Maas & Brian Webber
- Gamecenter, Gamebook

Game information

First quarter

- WAS – Darnerien McCants 11-yard pass from Shane Matthews (James Tuthill kick), 7:34 (WAS 7–0)

Second quarter

- SEA – Rian Lindell 23-yard field goal, 14:57 (WAS 7–3)
- WAS – Rod Gardner 19-yard pass from Shane Matthews (James Tuthill kick), 12:34 (WAS 14–3)

Third quarter

- No scoring plays

Fourth quarter

- No scoring plays

Top passers

- WAS – Shane Matthews: 10/27, 114 yds, 2 TD, 1 INT
- SEA – Matt Hasselbeck: 28/44, 264 yds

Top rushers

- WAS – Kenny Watson: 23 car, 110 yds
- SEA – Shaun Alexander: 19 car, 67 yds

Top receivers

- WAS – Rod Gardner: 4 rec, 47 yds, 1 TD
- SEA – Koren Robinson: 8 rec, 100 yds

Team – pass – rush – total – to

- WAS – 113 – 146 – 259 – 1
- SEA – 240 – 84 – 324 – 2

=== Standings ===
==== Division ====
NFC East
	W	L	T	PCT	DIV	CONF	PF	PA	STK
^{(1)} Philadelphia Eagles	12	4	0	.750	5–1	11–1	415	241	L1
^{(5)} New York Giants	10	6	0	.625	5–1	8–4	320	279	W4
Washington Redskins	7	9	0	.438	1–5	4–8	307	365	W2
Dallas Cowboys	5	11	0	.313	1–5	3–9	217	329	L4

==== Conference ====
NFC
#	Team	Division	W	L	T	PCT	DIV	CONF	SOS	SOV
Division leaders
1 (Note: Philadelphia finished ahead of Tampa Bay and Green Bay based on conference record (11–1 vs 9–3/9–3).)	Philadelphia Eagles	East	12	4	0	.750	5–1	11–1	.469	.432
2 (Note: Tampa Bay finished ahead of Green Bay based on head-to-head victory.)	Tampa Bay Buccaneers	South	12	4	0	.750	4–2	9–3	.482	.432
3	Green Bay Packers	North	12	4	0	.750	5–1	9–3	.451	.414
4	San Francisco 49ers	West	10	6	0	.625	5–1	8–4	.504	.450
Wild Cards
5	New York Giants	East	10	6	0	.625	5–1	8–4	.482	.450
6	Atlanta Falcons	South	9	6	1	.594	4–2	7–5	.494	.429
Did not qualify for the postseason
7	New Orleans Saints	South	9	7	0	.563	3–3	7–5	.498	.566
8 (Note: St. Louis finished ahead of Seattle based on division record (4–2 to 2–4).)	St. Louis Rams	West	7	9	0	.438	4–2	5–7	.508	.446
9	Seattle Seahawks	West	7	9	0	.438	2–4	5–7	.506	.433
10 (Note: Washington finished ahead of Carolina based on common games (2–3 to 1–4))	Washington Redskins	East	7	9	0	.438	1–5	4–8	.527	.438
11	Carolina Panthers	South	7	9	0	.438	1–5	4–8	.486	.357
12	Minnesota Vikings	North	6	10	0	.375	4–2	5–7	.498	.417
13 (Note: Arizona finished ahead of Dallas based on head-to-head victory.)	Arizona Cardinals	West	5	11	0	.313	1–5	5–7	.500	.400
14	Dallas Cowboys	East	5	11	0	.313	1–5	3–9	.500	.475
15	Chicago Bears	North	4	12	0	.250	2–4	3–9	.521	.430
16	Detroit Lions	North	3	13	0	.188	1–5	3–9	.494	.375
Tiebreakers (Note: When breaking ties for three or more teams under the NFL's rules, they are first broken within divisions, then comparing only the highest-ranked remaining team from each division.)
