= James Wofford (American football) =

American football player (born 1978)

No. 44
- Position: Running back

Personal information
- Born: June 6, 1978 (age 48); Bakersfield, California, U.S.
- Listed height: 6 ft 0 in (1.83 m)
- Listed weight: 186 lb (84 kg)

Career information
- High school: Bakersfield
- College: UNLV
- NFL draft: 2001: undrafted

Career history
- Minnesota Vikings (2001–2002)
- Stats at Pro Football Reference

James Ameer Wofford (born June 6, 1978) is an American former professional football player who was a running back for the Minnesota Vikings of National Football League (NFL). He played college football for the UNLV.
