= Bernard Jackson (American football, born 1980) =

American football player (born 1980)

No. 73
- Position: Defensive end

Personal information
- Born: May 10, 1980 (age 46); Louisville, Kentucky, U.S.
- Listed height: 6 ft 4 in (1.93 m)
- Listed weight: 301 lb (137 kg)

Career information
- High school: St. Xavier (Louisville)
- College: Tennessee (1998–2001)
- NFL draft: 2002: undrafted

Career history
- Washington Redskins (2002); Lexington Horsemen (2008)*; Louisville Fire (2008); Kentucky Horsemen (2009)
- * Offseason or practice squad member only

Awards and highlights
- National champion (1998)
- Stats at Pro Football Reference
- Stats at ArenaFan.com

Evington Bernard Jackson II (born May 10, 1980) is an American former professional football player who was a defensive end for the Washington Redskins of the National Football League (NFL). He played college football for the Tennessee Volunteers.

Jackson also played for the Louisville Fire and Kentucky Horsemen.

== Early life ==
Jackson attended St. Xavier High School where he was a three-year starter at Linebacker in football, as well as a center in basketball. In football, he was a two-time 4A All-State selection, as well as an All-Region and All-District selection. He also helped lead his team to two state championships in three seasons, with records of 14–1, 10–2 and 12–3, respectively. As a junior, he recorded 120 tackles, seven sacks, 19 tackles-for-loses, seven forced fumbles and five tipped passes that resulted in interceptions. As a senior, he recorded 119 tackles, and seven sacks. In football, he was a Parade, Blue Chip Illustrated, National Recruiting Advisor, and PrepStart All-America selection. He also won state titles in discus and Shot put.

== College career ==
Jackson attended the University of Tennessee, where in 1998, his freshman season, the Volunteers won the national championship.

As a freshman in 1998, Jackson played in 12 games, and was one of five true freshmen to play that season. He was a member of the Special teams and also played as reserve Defensive end. He recorded seven tackles with two quarterback pressures, a sack and a pass broken up. As a sophomore in 1999, he played in 12 games, and earned his first career start. He was a member of the Special teams who also played at Defensive end. For the season, he played in every game, including the Fiesta Bowl, only missed three quarters. For the season, he recorded 19 tackles, a sack, a tackle-for-loss and a pass broken up. In 2000 as a junior, he was primarily a Defensive end, who also played Special teams, and he played in 12 games and started two. In the preseason, he was projected to be a starter, but was a backup to starter DeAngelo Lloyd at Left end, until Lloyd suffered a head injury against LSU, which forced Jackson to start against Georgia. For the season, he recorded 12 tackles, including four tackles-for-losses, two recovered fumbles and five quarterback hurries. He earned his second start of the season in the Cotton Bowl Classic, a game in which he recorded five tackles, including two for losses. As a senior in 2001, he played in 11 games, starting 10, missing one due to suspension for a violation of team rules. Prior to the regular season games against LSU, Jackson worked his way into the starting Left end position. His best game of the season came against Kentucky, in which he recorded eight tackles. For his career, he recorded 78 tackles, three fumble recoveries, five sacks and 10 tackles-for-losses.

== Professional career ==
=== National Football League ===
Jackson went unselected in the 2002 NFL draft, however on April 25, he was signed by the Washington Redskins as a rookie free agent. However, on September 1, he was released in the team's final cuts. However, he was signed the next day to the teams' practice squad. Then, On November 19, he was promoted to the team's active roster and played in four games and recorded two tackles. However, on September 1, 2003, he was released again during the team's final cuts, after being sidelined for three weeks with a high ankle sprain.

=== af2 ===
In 2008, after being out of football for four years, Jackson joined af2, a professional Arena football league. He was assigned to the Lexington Horsemen. On April 10, he was placed on the "Refused to Report" list by the Horsemen. Then on May 5, he was traded to the Louisville Fire for Future Considerations. As a rookie in af2, he played in nine games, starting eight. He recorded 19.5 tackles, 4.5 sacks, six tackles-for-losses, eight Quarterback hurries, one forced fumble and three blocked kicks. He even returned one kickoff for six yards. On November 1, he was placed on Re-Assignment, which means that the league would assign him to another team.

On January 22, 2009, he was reassigned to the Horsemen. On April 17, he was suspended by the Horsemen.

== See also ==
- List of National Football League and Arena football players
