= Vinny Cerrato =

American football executive

Vinny Cerrato is a former executive for the San Francisco 49ers and Washington Redskins of the National Football League (NFL). He led the Redskins' personnel department throughout the 2000s as their de facto general manager. Cerrato has also been an analyst and film actor.

== Biography ==
=== Playing career ===
Cerrato played college football at Iowa State University, where he played quarterback and wide receiver.

== Football career ==
=== Oakland Invaders ===
Cerrato signed a contract with the USFL Oakland Invaders in January 1983, however, was cut in training camp a month later.

=== University of Minnesota ===
Cerrato started his career as a graduate assistant for the Minnesota Golden Gophers from 1983 to 1984, and he was promoted to recruiting coordinator in 1985, before leaving for Notre Dame.

=== Notre Dame ===
Before the NFL, Cerrato served as the football recruiting coordinator under Lou Holtz at the University of Notre Dame. During that time, the Irish played in four Bowl games and won the 1988 NCAA National Championship.

=== San Francisco 49ers ===
Cerrato joined the San Francisco 49ers in 1991 as a scout, and later became the team's director of college scouting in June 1992, helping to draft players such as Ted Washington, Ricky Watters, Dana Stubblefield and Bryant Young. In 1994, the 49ers won Super Bowl XXIX. It was also this during time that Cerrato appeared as an actor in the 1994 film Kindergarten Ninja. In February 1995, Cerrato was promoted to director of player personnel, overseeing all college scouting and draft activities as well as pro scouting of NFL players and opponents.

=== Washington Redskins ===
In July 1999, Cerrato was hired as the director of player personnel for the Washington Redskins. During this time, he acquired older big name stars like Bruce Smith, Deion Sanders, Irving Fryar, Jeff George, and Mark Carrier. He was then fired by Marty Schottenheimer in 2001, working as a college football analyst for ESPN. Cerrato was subsequently rehired in 2002 as their vice president of football operations following the firing of Schottenheimer. He resigned from the team on December 17, 2009.
