= 2002 NFL season =

American football season

Regular season
- Duration: September 5 – December 30, 2002

Playoffs
- Start date: January 4, 2003
- AFC Champions: Oakland Raiders
- NFC Champions: Tampa Bay Buccaneers

Super Bowl XXXVII
- Date: January 26, 2003
- Site: Qualcomm Stadium, San Diego, California
- Champions: Tampa Bay Buccaneers

Pro Bowl
- Date: February 2, 2003
- Site: Aloha Stadium

AFC teams: West, North, South, East
NFC teams: West, North, South, East

The 2002 NFL season was the 83rd regular season of the National Football League (NFL).

The league went back to an even number of teams with the addition of the Houston Texans; the league has remained static with 32 teams since. The clubs were realigned into eight divisions, four teams in each. Also, the Chicago Bears played their home games in 2002 in Champaign, Illinois, at Memorial Stadium because of the reconstruction of Soldier Field.

The NFL title was won by the Tampa Bay Buccaneers when they defeated the Oakland Raiders 48–21 in Super Bowl XXXVII, at Qualcomm Stadium in San Diego, California, on January 26, 2003. It is the last Super Bowl held in January and the last to be hosted in San Diego.

This was the first season to feature the "Equipment NFL" logo on the Yoke of the jerseys.

On November 10, during Week 10, a game between the Atlanta Falcons and Pittsburgh Steelers at Heinz Field ended in a 34–34 tie, the first NFL tie game since November 23, 1997, when the New York Giants and Washington Redskins ended in a 7–7 draw. No more games would end in a tie until 2008.

== Expansion and realignment ==
With the Houston Texans joining the NFL, the teams were realigned into eight divisions: four teams in each division and four divisions in each conference. The league tried to maintain historical rivalries from the old alignment while organizing the teams geographically. Legally, three teams from the AFC Central (Cincinnati, Cleveland, and Pittsburgh) were required to be in the same division as part of any realignment proposals; this was part of the NFL's settlement with the city of Cleveland in the wake of the 1995 Cleveland Browns relocation controversy.

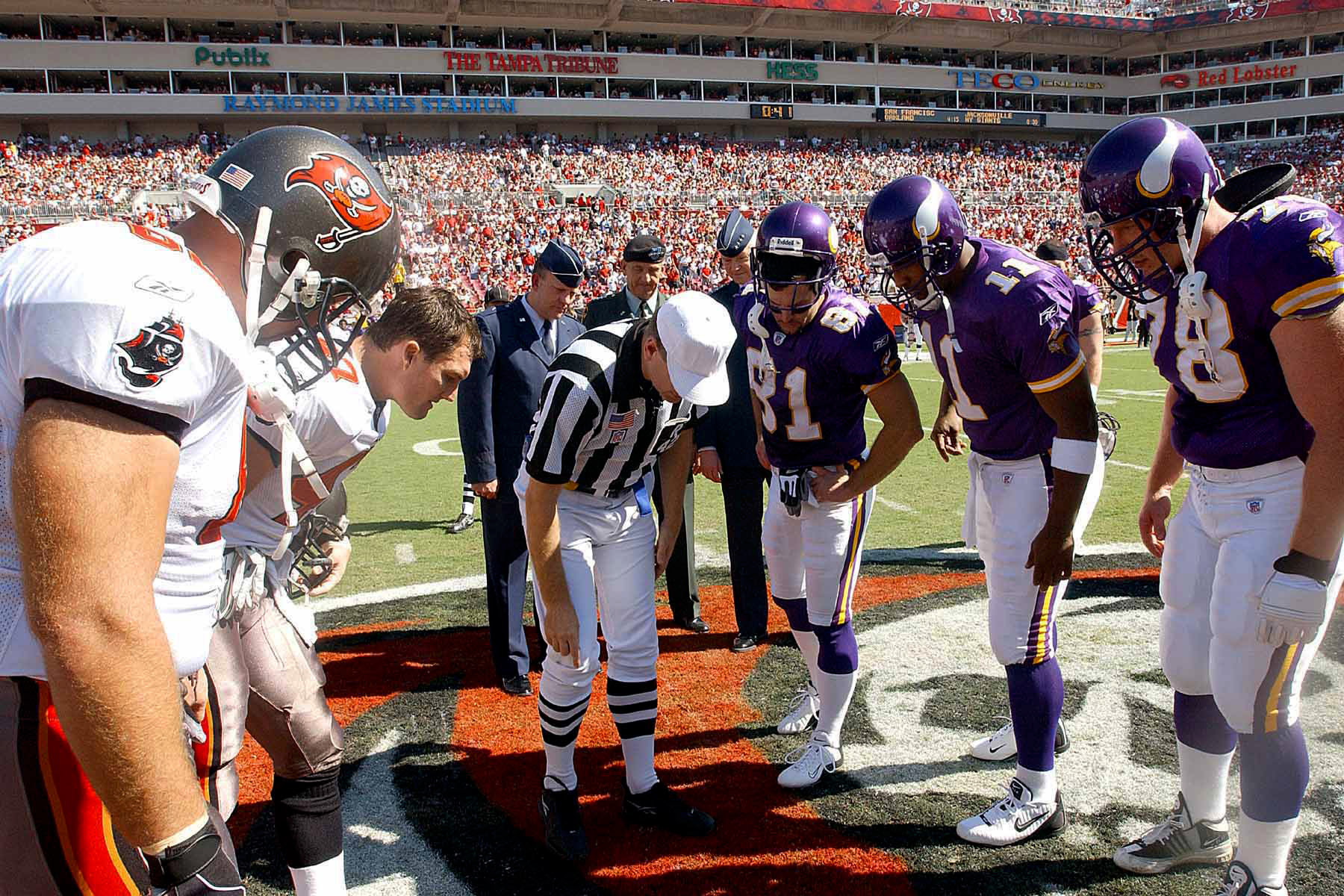
The Tampa Bay Buccaneers, the eventual Super Bowl winners, hosting the Minnesota Vikings in week 9

The major changes were:

- The Indianapolis Colts from the AFC East, Jacksonville Jaguars and Tennessee Titans from the AFC Central, and expansion Houston Texans were placed into the newly formed AFC South. The owners of the Jaguars, Titans, and Texans tried to convince Dolphins owner Wayne Huizenga for the Dolphins to take the 4th spot in the AFC South instead of the Colts but Huizenga ultimately decided for the Dolphins to remain with their longtime rivals in the new AFC East.
- The Atlanta Falcons, Carolina Panthers, and New Orleans Saints from the NFC West and Tampa Bay Buccaneers from the NFC Central were placed into the newly formed NFC South.
- The teams in the AFC Central and NFC Central were placed in the new AFC North and NFC North respectively, apart from the Titans, Jaguars, and Buccaneers.
- The Seattle Seahawks became the first team since 1977 to switch conferences, and the only team to do it twice, returning from the AFC West to the NFC West, where they had played in their first season, 1976.
- The Arizona Cardinals moved from the NFC East to the NFC West. Owner Bill Bidwill was publicly disappointed by the decision but said he would accept it.

Additionally, the arrival of the Texans meant that the league could return to its pre-1999 scheduling format in which no team received a bye during the first three weeks or last seven weeks of the season. From 1999 to 2001, at least one team sat out each week (including the preseason) because of an odd number of teams in the league (this also happened in 1960, 1966, and other years wherein the league had an odd number of teams). It nearly became problematic during the previous season due to the September 11 attacks, since the San Diego Chargers had their bye week during that week and the league considered cancelling that week's slate of games before ultimately rescheduling them after Week 17.

The league also introduced a new eight-year scheduling rotation designed so that all teams will play each other at least twice during those eight years, and play in every other team's stadium at least once. Under scheduling formulas in use from 1978 to 2001, there were several instances of two teams in different divisions going over 15 seasons without playing each other. (Note: In the most extreme cases, the Philadelphia Eagles and Kansas City Chiefs did not play from 1973 through 1991, the New York Jets and St. Louis/Phoenix/Arizona Cardinals did not play from 1979 through 1995, the Miami Dolphins and New York Giants did not play from 1973 through 1989, the Seattle Seahawks and Tampa Bay Buccaneers did not play from 1978 through 1993, and the Miami Dolphins and Denver Broncos only played one time from 1976 through 1997. Additionally, while the Buffalo Bills played the Tampa Bay Buccaneers seven times between 1976 and 2001, all seven of those games were played in Tampa.) Under the new scheduling formula, only two of a team's games each season are based on the previous season's record, down from four under the previous system. All teams play four interconference games. An analysis of win percentages in 2008 showed a statistical trend upward for top teams since this change; the top team each year then averaged 14.2 wins, versus 13.4 previously.

The playoff format was also modified from the one first used in 1990: the number of playoff teams remained the same at 12, but four division winners and two wild cards from each conference advanced to the playoffs, instead of three division winners and three wild cards. In each conference, the division winners were now seeded 1 through 4, and the wild cards were seeded 5 and 6. The only way a wild card team could host a playoff game was if both teams in the conference's championship game were wild cards. This 2002 revised format lasted until 2019. In 2020, the number of playoff teams expanded to 14, and the number of wild card teams went back to three.

== Player movement ==
=== Draft ===
The 2002 NFL draft was held from April 20 to 21, 2002, at New York City's Theater at Madison Square Garden. With the first pick, the Houston Texans selected quarterback David Carr from Fresno State University.

=== Expansion draft ===
The 2002 NFL expansion draft was held on February 18, 2002. 155 players were left unprotected by their teams for the Houston Texans to select to fill their initial roster. With the first overall pick, the Texans selected offensive tackle Tony Boselli from the Jacksonville Jaguars.

== Notable retirements ==
- Pat Tillman
- Phil Hansen
- Ryan Leaf
- Percy Ellsworth
- Tony Martin
- Jeff Graham
- Terrell Davis
- Cortez Kennedy
- Eric Allen
- Ricky Watters
- Jamal Anderson
- Glyn Milburn
- Derrick Mayes
- Tony Siragusa
- James Hasty
- Elvis Grbac
- Randall Cunningham
- Scott Mitchell
- Jim Turner
- Andy Vincent
- Steve Wisniewski
- Stephen Boyd
- Bruce Matthews
- Leon Lett
- Conrad Hamilton
- Brock Olivo
- Rich Tylski
- Ron Rice
- Kurt Schulz
- Jerry Ostroski
- Russell Maryland

== Major rule changes ==
- A player who touches a pylon remains in-bounds until any part of his body touches the ground out-of-bounds.
- Continuing-action fouls now become dead-ball fouls and will result in the loss of down and distance.
- Any dead-ball penalties by the offense after they have made the line to gain will result in a loss of 15 yards and a new first down. Previously, the 15 yard penalty was enforced but the down was replayed.

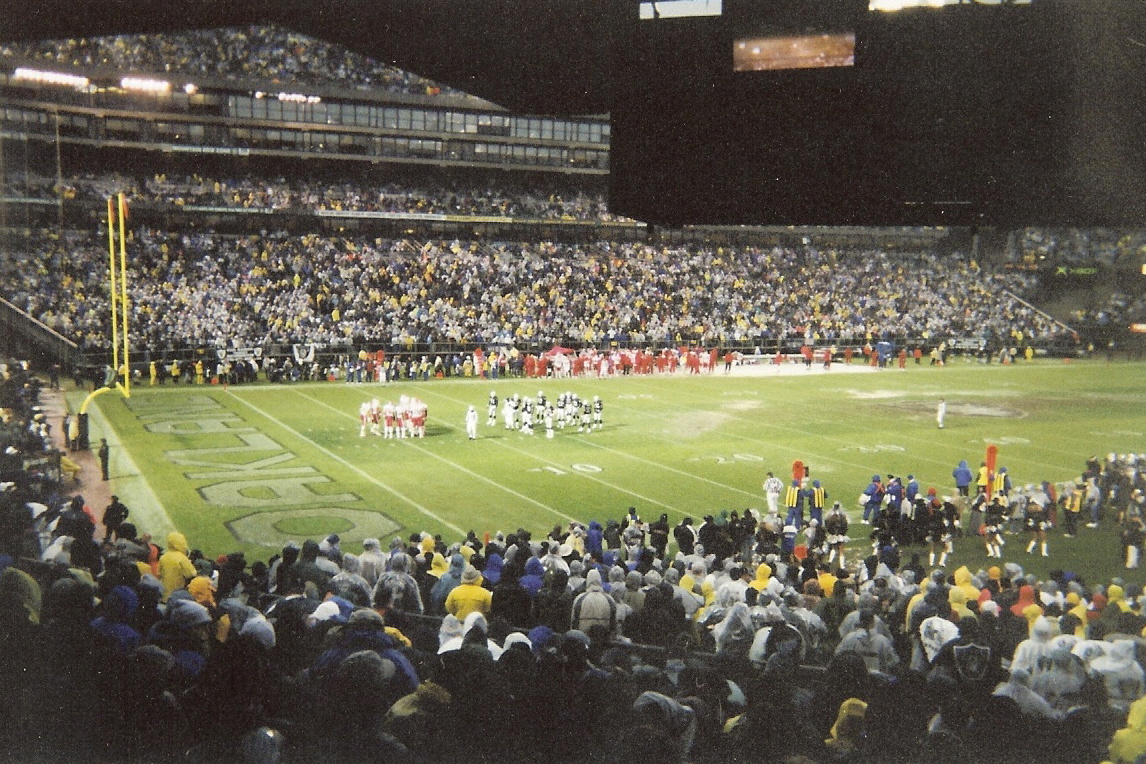
The 2002–03 AFC Champion Oakland Raiders playing at home against the Kansas City Chiefs on December 28, 2002

- The act of batting and stripping the ball from a player is now legal.
- Chop-blocks are illegal on kicking plays.
- Hitting a quarterback helmet-to-helmet anytime after a change of possession is illegal.
- After a kickoff, the game clock will start when the ball is touched legally in the field of play. Previously, the clock started immediately when the ball was kicked.
- Inside the final two minutes of a half/overtime, the game clock will not stop when the player who originally takes the snap is tackled behind the line of scrimmage (i.e. sacked).

Also, with the opening of the NFL's first stadium with a retractable roof, Reliant Stadium, the following rules were enacted:

- The home team must determine whether their retractable roof is to be opened or closed 90 minutes before kickoff (regular season only; in the playoffs, the NFL determines whether the roof is open or closed).
- If it is closed at kickoff, it cannot be reopened during the game.
- If it is open at kickoff, it cannot be closed during the game unless the weather conditions become severe.

This rule was amended in 2015 to allow a roof to be opened or closed at halftime, at the home team's discretion.

== 2002 deaths ==
- Johnny Unitas who died on September 11, 2002, from a heart attack. On Week 2 of the season, each game played held a moment of silence pre-game tribute to Unitas.
- Dick "Night Train" Lane
- Mike Webster
- Al Lerner, owner of the Cleveland Browns, died during the 2002 season from brain cancer. The Browns wore a patch on their uniforms to commemorate Lerner.

== Regular season standings ==
=== Division ===
AFC East
	W	L	T	PCT	DIV	CONF	PF	PA	STK
^{(4)} New York Jets	9	7	0	.563	4–2	6–6	359	336	W2
New England Patriots	9	7	0	.563	4–2	6–6	381	346	W1
Miami Dolphins	9	7	0	.563	2–4	7–5	378	301	L2
Buffalo Bills	8	8	0	.500	2–4	5–7	379	397	W1

AFC North
	W	L	T	PCT	DIV	CONF	PF	PA	STK
^{(3)} Pittsburgh Steelers	10	5	1	.656	6–0	8–4	390	345	W3
^{(6)} Cleveland Browns	9	7	0	.563	3–3	7–5	344	320	W2
Baltimore Ravens	7	9	0	.438	3–3	7–5	316	354	L2
Cincinnati Bengals	2	14	0	.125	0–6	1–11	279	456	L1

AFC South
	W	L	T	PCT	DIV	CONF	PF	PA	STK
^{(2)} Tennessee Titans	11	5	0	.688	6–0	9–3	367	324	W5
^{(5)} Indianapolis Colts	10	6	0	.625	4–2	8–4	349	313	W1
Jacksonville Jaguars	6	10	0	.375	1–5	4–8	328	315	L2
Houston Texans	4	12	0	.250	1–5	2–10	213	356	L3

AFC West
	W	L	T	PCT	DIV	CONF	PF	PA	STK
^{(1)} Oakland Raiders	11	5	0	.688	4–2	9–3	450	304	W2
Denver Broncos	9	7	0	.563	3–3	5–7	392	344	W1
San Diego Chargers	8	8	0	.500	3–3	6–6	333	367	L4
Kansas City Chiefs	8	8	0	.500	2–4	6–6	467	399	L1

NFC East
	W	L	T	PCT	DIV	CONF	PF	PA	STK
^{(1)} Philadelphia Eagles	12	4	0	.750	5–1	11–1	415	241	L1
^{(5)} New York Giants	10	6	0	.625	5–1	8–4	320	279	W4
Washington Redskins	7	9	0	.438	1–5	4–8	307	365	W2
Dallas Cowboys	5	11	0	.313	1–5	3–9	217	329	L4

NFC North
	W	L	T	PCT	DIV	CONF	PF	PA	STK
^{(3)} Green Bay Packers	12	4	0	.750	5–1	9–3	398	328	L1
Minnesota Vikings	6	10	0	.375	4–2	5–7	390	442	W3
Chicago Bears	4	12	0	.250	2–4	3–9	281	379	L2
Detroit Lions	3	13	0	.188	1–5	3–9	306	451	L8

NFC South
	W	L	T	PCT	DIV	CONF	PF	PA	STK
^{(2)} Tampa Bay Buccaneers	12	4	0	.750	4–2	9–3	346	196	W1
^{(6)} Atlanta Falcons	9	6	1	.594	4–2	7–5	402	314	L1
New Orleans Saints	9	7	0	.563	3–3	7–5	432	388	L3
Carolina Panthers	7	9	0	.438	1–5	4–8	258	302	W2

NFC West
	W	L	T	PCT	DIV	CONF	PF	PA	STK
^{(4)} San Francisco 49ers	10	6	0	.625	5–1	8–4	367	351	L1
St. Louis Rams	7	9	0	.438	4–2	5–7	316	369	W1
Seattle Seahawks	7	9	0	.438	2–4	5–7	355	369	W3
Arizona Cardinals	5	11	0	.313	1–5	5–7	262	417	L3

=== Conference ===
AFC
#	Team	Division	W	L	T	PCT	DIV	CONF	SOS	SOV
Division leaders
1 (Note: Oakland finished ahead of Tennessee based on head-to-head victory.)	Oakland Raiders	West	11	5	0	.688	4–2	9–3	.529	.531
2	Tennessee Titans	South	11	5	0	.688	6–0	9–3	.479	.474
3	Pittsburgh Steelers	North	10	5	1	.656	6–0	8–4	.486	.451
4 (Note: N.Y. Jets finished ahead of New England based on win percentage in common games (8–4 to 7–5) after both finished ahead of Miami based on division record (4–2 to 2–4).)	New York Jets	East	9	7	0	.563	4–2	6–6	.500	.500
Wild Cards
5	Indianapolis Colts	South	10	6	0	.625	4–2	8–4	.479	.400
6 (Note: Cleveland finished ahead of Denver and New England based on conference record (7–5 vs 5–7/6–6))	Cleveland Browns	North	9	7	0	.563	3–3	7–5	.486	.413
Did not qualify for the postseason
7 (Note: Denver finished ahead of New England based on head-to-head victory.)	Denver Broncos	West	9	7	0	.563	3–3	5–7	.527	.486
8 (Note: New England finished ahead of Miami based on division record (4–2 to 2–4).)	New England Patriots	East	9	7	0	.563	4–2	6–6	.525	.455
9	Miami Dolphins	East	9	7	0	.563	2–4	7–5	.508	.486
10 (Note: Buffalo finished ahead of San Diego based on head-to-head victory.)	Buffalo Bills	East	8	8	0	.500	2–4	5–7	.473	.352
11 (Note: San Diego finished ahead of Kansas City based on division record (3–3 to 2–4).)	San Diego Chargers	West	8	8	0	.500	3–3	6–6	.492	.453
12	Kansas City Chiefs	West	8	8	0	.500	2–4	6–6	.527	.516
13	Baltimore Ravens	North	7	9	0	.438	3–3	7–5	.506	.384
14	Jacksonville Jaguars	South	6	10	0	.375	1–5	4–8	.506	.438
15	Houston Texans	South	4	12	0	.250	1–5	2–10	.518	.492
16	Cincinnati Bengals	North	2	14	0	.125	0–6	1–11	.537	.406
Tiebreakers (Note: When breaking ties for three or more teams under the NFL's rules, they are first broken within divisions, then comparing only the highest ranked remaining team from each division.)

NFC
#	Team	Division	W	L	T	PCT	DIV	CONF	SOS	SOV
Division leaders
1 (Note: Philadelphia finished ahead of Tampa Bay and Green Bay based on conference record (11–1 vs 9–3/9–3).)	Philadelphia Eagles	East	12	4	0	.750	5–1	11–1	.469	.432
2 (Note: Tampa Bay finished ahead of Green Bay based on head-to-head victory.)	Tampa Bay Buccaneers	South	12	4	0	.750	4–2	9–3	.482	.432
3	Green Bay Packers	North	12	4	0	.750	5–1	9–3	.451	.414
4	San Francisco 49ers	West	10	6	0	.625	5–1	8–4	.504	.450
Wild Cards
5	New York Giants	East	10	6	0	.625	5–1	8–4	.482	.450
6	Atlanta Falcons	South	9	6	1	.594	4–2	7–5	.494	.429
Did not qualify for the postseason
7	New Orleans Saints	South	9	7	0	.563	3–3	7–5	.498	.566
8 (Note: St. Louis finished ahead of Seattle based on division record (4–2 to 2–4).)	St. Louis Rams	West	7	9	0	.438	4–2	5–7	.508	.446
9	Seattle Seahawks	West	7	9	0	.438	2–4	5–7	.506	.433
10 (Note: Washington finished ahead of Carolina based on common games (2–3 to 1–4))	Washington Redskins	East	7	9	0	.438	1–5	4–8	.527	.438
11	Carolina Panthers	South	7	9	0	.438	1–5	4–8	.486	.357
12	Minnesota Vikings	North	6	10	0	.375	4–2	5–7	.498	.417
13 (Note: Arizona finished ahead of Dallas based on head-to-head victory.)	Arizona Cardinals	West	5	11	0	.313	1–5	5–7	.500	.400
14	Dallas Cowboys	East	5	11	0	.313	1–5	3–9	.500	.475
15	Chicago Bears	North	4	12	0	.250	2–4	3–9	.521	.430
16	Detroit Lions	North	3	13	0	.188	1–5	3–9	.494	.375
Tiebreakers (Note: When breaking ties for three or more teams under the NFL's rules, they are first broken within divisions, then comparing only the highest-ranked remaining team from each division.)

== Playoffs ==
Within each conference, the four division winners and the top two non-division winners with the best overall regular season records) qualified for the playoffs. The four division winners are seeded 1–4 based on their overall won-lost-tied record, and the wild card teams are seeded 5–6. The NFL does not use a fixed bracket playoff system, and there are no restrictions regarding teams from the same division matching up in any round. In the first round, dubbed the wild-card playoffs or wild-card weekend, the third-seeded division winner hosts the sixth-seed wild card, and the fourth seed hosts the fifth. The 1 and 2 seeds from each conference received a first-round bye. In the second round, the divisional playoffs, the number 1 seed hosts the worst-surviving seed from the first round (seed 4, 5, or 6), while the number 2 seed will play the other team (seed 3, 4, or 5). The two surviving teams from each conference's divisional playoff games met in the respective AFC and NFC Conference Championship games, hosted by the higher seed. Although the Super Bowl, the championship round of the playoffs, is played at a neutral site, the designated home team is based on an annual rotation by conference.

Playoff seeds
Seed	AFC	NFC
1	Oakland Raiders (West winner)	Philadelphia Eagles (East winner)
2	Tennessee Titans (South winner)	Tampa Bay Buccaneers (South winner)
3	Pittsburgh Steelers (North winner)	Green Bay Packers (North winner)
4	New York Jets (East winner)	San Francisco 49ers (West winner)
5	Indianapolis Colts (wild card)	New York Giants (wild card)
6	Cleveland Browns (wild card)	Atlanta Falcons (wild card)

=== Bracket ===
Jan 5 – Heinz Field	Jan 11 – The Coliseum
6	Cleveland	33
3	Pittsburgh	31
3	Pittsburgh	36	Jan 19 – Network Associates Coliseum
2	Tennessee	34*
AFC
Jan 4 – Giants Stadium	2	Tennessee	24
Jan 12 – Network Associates Coliseum
1	Oakland	41
5	Indianapolis	0	AFC Championship
4	NY Jets	10
4	NY Jets	41	Jan 26 – Qualcomm Stadium
1	Oakland	30
Wild-card round
Divisional round
Jan 5 – Candlestick Park	A1	Oakland	21
Jan 12 – Raymond James Stadium
N2	Tampa Bay	48
5	NY Giants	38	Super Bowl XXXVII
4	San Francisco	6
4	San Francisco	39	Jan 19 – Veterans Stadium
2	Tampa Bay	31
NFC
Jan 4 – Lambeau Field	2	Tampa Bay	27
Jan 11 – Veterans Stadium
1	Philadelphia	10
6	Atlanta	27	NFC Championship
6	Atlanta	6
3	Green Bay	7
1	Philadelphia	20

* Indicates OT victory

== Milestones ==
The following teams and players set all-time NFL records during the season:

Record	Player/team	Date/opponent	Previous record holder
Most pass receptions, season	Marvin Harrison, Indianapolis (143)	December 29, vs. Jacksonville	Herman Moore, Detroit, 1995 (123)
Longest return of a missed field goal	Chris McAlister, Baltimore (107 yards)	September 30, vs. Denver	Aaron Glenn, N.Y. Jets vs. Indianapolis, November 15, 1998 (104)
Yards from scrimmage, career	Jerry Rice, Oakland (21,284)	September 29, vs. Tennessee	Walter Payton, 1975–1987 (21,264)
Most rushing yards gained, career	Emmitt Smith, Dallas	October 27, vs. Seattle	Walter Payton, 1975–1987 (16,726)
Most rushing yards by a quarterback, game	Michael Vick, Atlanta (173)	December 1 vs. Minnesota	Tobin Rote, Green Bay vs. Chicago, November 18, 1951 (150)
Most first downs by both teams, game	Seattle (32) vs. Kansas City (32) [64 total]	November 24	Tied by 2 games (62 total)
Fewest fumbles by a team, season	Kansas City (7)	N/A	Cleveland, 1959 (8)
Fewest fumbles lost by a team, season	Kansas City (2)	N/A	Tied by 2 teams (3)
Most punts by a team, season	Houston (116)	N/A	Chicago, 1981 (114)

== Statistical leaders ==
=== Team ===
Points scored	Kansas City Chiefs (467)
Total yards gained	Oakland Raiders (6,237)
Yards rushing	Minnesota Vikings (2,507)
Yards passing	Oakland Raiders (4,475)
Fewest points allowed	Tampa Bay Buccaneers (196)
Fewest total yards allowed	Tampa Bay Buccaneers (4,044)
Fewest rushing yards allowed	Pittsburgh Steelers (1,375)
Fewest passing yards allowed	Tampa Bay Buccaneers (2,490)

=== Individual ===
Scoring	Priest Holmes, Kansas City (144 points)
Touchdowns	Priest Holmes, Kansas City (24 TDs)
Most field goals made	Martin Gramatica, Tampa Bay (32 FGs)
Rushing	Ricky Williams, Miami (1,853 yards)
Passing	Rich Gannon, Oakland Raiders (4,689 yards)
Passing touchdowns	Tom Brady, New England (28 TDs)
Pass receiving	Marvin Harrison, Indianapolis (143 catches)
Pass receiving yards	Marvin Harrison, Indianapolis (1,722)
Punt returns	Jimmy Williams, San Francisco (16.8 average yards)
Kickoff returns	MarTay Jenkins, Arizona (28.0 average yards)
Interceptions	Brian Kelly, Tampa Bay (8)
Punting	Todd Sauerbrun, Carolina (45.5 average yards)
Sacks	Jason Taylor, Miami (18.5)

== Awards ==
Most Valuable Player	Rich Gannon, quarterback, Oakland
Coach of the Year	Andy Reid, Philadelphia
Offensive Player of the Year	Priest Holmes, running back, Kansas City
Defensive Player of the Year	Derrick Brooks, linebacker, Tampa Bay
Offensive Rookie of the Year	Clinton Portis, running back, Denver
Defensive Rookie of the Year	Julius Peppers, defensive end, Carolina
NFL Comeback Player of the Year	Tommy Maddox, quarterback, Pittsburgh
Walter Payton NFL Man of the Year	Troy Vincent, cornerback, Philadelphia
Super Bowl Most Valuable Player	Dexter Jackson, safety, Tampa Bay

== Head coach/front office changes ==
Head coach

- Houston Texans – Dom Capers was hired as the Texans’ first head coach on January 19th, 2001.
- Carolina Panthers – John Fox replaced George Seifert, who was fired following the 2001 season
- Indianapolis Colts – Tony Dungy replaced Jim Mora, who was fired following the 2001 season
- Minnesota Vikings – Mike Tice replaced Dennis Green, who was fired before Week 17 of the 2001 season. Tice served as interim coach for the final game and officially became the new head coach three days later.
- Oakland Raiders – Bill Callahan replaced Jon Gruden, who was traded to Tampa for two 1st round draft picks, two 2nd round draft picks and cash.
- San Diego Chargers – Marty Schottenheimer replaced Mike Riley, who was fired following the 2001 season
- Tampa Bay Buccaneers – Jon Gruden replaced Tony Dungy, who was fired following the 2001 season
- Washington Redskins – Steve Spurrier replaced Marty Schottenheimer, who was fired following the 2001 season

Front office

- Houston Texans – Charley Casserly was hired as the first executive vice president/GM of the Texans on January 19th, 2000.
- Carolina Panthers – Marty Hurney replaced George Seifert, who was fired following the 2001 season
- Denver Broncos – Ted Sundquist was promoted to replace Neal Dahlen, who became the team's director of football administration.
- Minnesota Vikings – Rob Brzezinski replaced former head coach Dennis Green as de facto general manager.
- Washington Redskins – Vinny Cerrato was rehired as vice president of football operations following the firing of Marty Schottenheimer. Cerrato had previously been the director of player personnel in 1999 and 2000 before being fired by the incoming Schottenheimer in 2001.
- New Orleans Saints – Mickey Loomis replaced Randy Mueller, who was unexpectedly fired on May 9th, 2002, not even a week after owner Tom Benson had offered him a contract extension.
- Atlanta Falcons – Head coach Dan Reeves became de-facto general manager after the resignation of Harold Richardson on May 9, 2002.
- Cleveland Browns – Head coach Butch Davis replaced Dwight Clark, who resigned from his position on May 14, 2002.
- Baltimore Ravens – Ozzie Newsome was named the first general manager of the Ravens on November 22, 2002.

== Stadium changes ==
- Baltimore Ravens: PSINet Stadium reverted to Ravens Stadium after naming rights holder PSINet filed for bankruptcy
- Chicago Bears: The Bears temporarily played at Memorial Stadium in Champaign, Illinois, while Soldier Field underwent a major renovation
- Dallas Cowboys: Texas Stadium's AstroTurf was replaced with new RealGrass turf surface by week 5 of the season.
- Detroit Lions: The Lions moved from the Silverdome in Pontiac, Michigan, to Ford Field in Downtown Detroit, with the Ford Motor Company acquiring the naming rights
- Houston Texans: The expansion Texans began playing at Reliant Stadium, the league's first stadium with a retractable roof, with Reliant Energy acquiring the naming rights
- New England Patriots: The Patriots moved from Foxboro Stadium to CMGI Field (known better as Gillette Stadium), with the tech company CMGI acquiring the naming rights
- St. Louis Rams: The former Trans World Dome was renamed the Edward Jones Dome after Edward Jones Investments acquired the naming rights
- Seattle Seahawks: The Seahawks moved from Husky Stadium to Seahawks Stadium
- Tennessee Titans: Adelphia Coliseum reverted to The Coliseum after naming rights holder Adelphia Communications Corporation filed for bankruptcy

== New uniforms ==
=== Reebok becomes official provider ===
Reebok took over the contract to be the official exclusive athletic supplier to the NFL for all 32 teams' uniforms. Previously, all teams had individual contracts with athletic suppliers. American Needle, which had a contract with a few teams before the Reebok deal, challenged the NFL in court over Reebok's exclusive deal, with the NFL effectively stating that it was a "single-entity league" instead of a group consisting of various owners. The case eventually went all the way to the Supreme Court of the United States. In 2009, the Supreme Court agreed to hear American Needle, Inc. v. National Football League. In 2010, the court ruled that the NFL is not a single entity and that NFL teams are distinct economic actors with separate economic interests that are capable of conspiring under the Sherman Act.. Reebok remained the league's athletic supplier through the 2011 NFL season, when Nike took over the contract for the 2012 NFL season.

Reebok had initially announced when the deal was signed in 2000 that aside from the expansion Texans, all NFL teams would be wearing new uniforms for the 2002 season. However, after protests from several owners—most vocally Pittsburgh Steelers owner Dan Rooney—Reebok later rescinded the proposal. Reebok did, however (by player request to reduce holding calls), shorten the sleeves on the jerseys for teams that hadn't done so already (most players had been for the previous decade tying the sleeves tight around their arms to prevent holding) and made the jerseys tighter-fitting. This is perhaps most noticeable on the Indianapolis Colts jerseys, where the shoulder stripes, which initially went from the top of the shoulders all the way underneath the arms, were truncated to just the top portion of the shoulders.

=== Uniform changes ===
Although Reebok rescinded the idea of all NFL teams wearing new uniforms for the 2002 season, the Buffalo Bills and Seattle Seahawks did redesign their uniforms, with the Seahawks also unveiling an updated logo in honor of their move to Seahawks Stadium and the NFC.

- The Arizona Cardinals wore white pants with white jerseys for two games, and red pants with red jerseys for one game. It was the first time they wore all-white since 1989, and first time they ever wore all-red.
- The Buffalo Bills introduced new uniforms featuring, among others, a darker shade of blue, nickel gray as an accent color, and red side panels on both the home and away jerseys
- The Carolina Panthers added blue third alternate uniforms
- The Cleveland Browns added orange third alternate uniforms
- The Denver Broncos added orange third alternate uniforms
- The Houston Texans expansion team introduced dark blue helmets; dark blue and white jerseys, both with red trim; and white pants to be worn with the blue jerseys and blue pants with the white jerseys. The new helmet logo features a bull head colored and shaped in such a way to resemble the flag of Texas and the state of Texas.
- The Jacksonville Jaguars added black third alternate uniforms, and introduced new black pants with home uniforms for selected games.
- The New Orleans Saints returned to wearing gold pants with their black jerseys, and with their white jerseys for selected games. They introduced a gold alternate jersey but only wore it for one game (week 15 vs. Minnesota).
- The New York Jets began wearing green pants with either their green or white jerseys
- The San Diego Chargers switched back to navy pants with white jerseys, also brought back throwback powder blue uniforms for the first time since 2000 which they wore for hall of fame weekend.
- The Seattle Seahawks introduced new uniforms featuring, among others, a lighter "Seahawks Blue", a darker "Seahawks Navy" and lime green piping. The helmet was changed from silver to the darker navy color. The helmet logo was also modified, re-colored accordingly to the new team colors, and the eyebrows and eyes redrawn to make it a more aggressive bird.
- The St. Louis Rams removed the side panels from their jerseys.
- The Washington Redskins introduced replicas of their 1960s uniform, which would temporarily serve as the team's home uniform to commemorate their 70th anniversary. They retained their standard away uniforms for the season.

== Television ==
This was the fifth year under the league's eight-year broadcast contracts with ABC, CBS, Fox, and ESPN to televise Monday Night Football, the AFC package, the NFC package, and Sunday Night Football, respectively.

This was the first season since 1980 without a Pat Summerall–John Madden lead broadcast team. Although Summerall had previously announced his retirement as a full-time NFL broadcaster after the 2001 season ended, he continued to call mostly Dallas Cowboys games for Fox in 2002. Meanwhile, ABC hired Madden from Fox to join Al Michaels in a two-man booth, dropping the network's experiment with Michaels, Dan Fouts, and comedian Dennis Miller on MNF.

Joe Buck, Troy Aikman, and Cris Collinsworth replaced Summerall and Madden as Fox's new lead broadcast team. Fox opted to leave Dick Stockton and Daryl Johnston as Fox's #2 team in a two-man booth, and not find a replacement for Aikman there. To replace Collinsworth on Fox NFL Sunday, the network initially used a rotating series of guest analysts before Jimmy Johnson took over the seat permanently midway through the season. Ron Pitts was promoted to Play-by-Play commentator replacing Ray Bentley, however for select games served as a sideline reporter for Dick Stockton and Daryl Johnston.

Boomer Esiason and Dan Marino joined The NFL Today as analysts and Deion Sanders was promoted to pregame analyst, while Randy Cross went back to color commentating for CBS, Mike Ditka left the program, and Jerry Glanville was a reserve color commentator from 2002 to 2003.
