= 2006 Chicago Bears–Arizona Cardinals game =

Notable NFL game

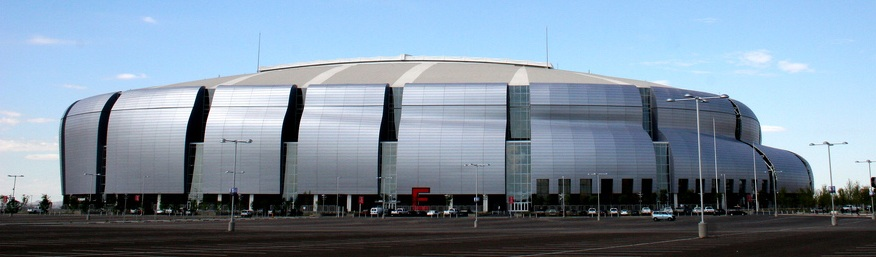
- University of Phoenix Stadium, the site of the game.
Chicago Bears (5–0)	Arizona Cardinals (1–4)
24	23
Head coach: Lovie Smith	Head coach: Dennis Green
	1	2	3	4	Total
CHI	0	0	10	14	24
ARI	14	6	3	0	23
- Date: October 16, 2006
- Stadium: University of Phoenix Stadium; Glendale, Arizona
- Favorite: Bears by 13
- Referee: Jerome Boger
- Attendance: 63,977

TV in the United States
- Network: ESPN
- Announcers: Mike Tirico (play-by-play), Tony Kornheiser and Joe Theismann (color commentators)

On October 16, 2006, during Week 6 of the National Football League (NFL) regular season, the Chicago Bears defeated the Arizona Cardinals, 24–23, at University of Phoenix Stadium in Glendale, Arizona. The undefeated Bears staged the "comeback of the year" against the 1-win Cardinals after trailing by 20 points at halftime. This game is the first game in which the Bears won after trailing by 20 or more points since 1987 (they defeated the Tampa Bay Buccaneers, 27–26). According to the Elias Sports Bureau, it was the first win in Bears history in which they trailed by at least 20 points in the second half, and the Cardinals became the first team in NFL history to lose consecutive games in a season after being ahead by 14 or more points at the end of the first quarter in each of their games. The Bears also set an NFL record for the biggest comeback without scoring an offensive touchdown in league history. Cardinals quarterback Matt Leinart became the first quarterback in history to throw at least 2 touchdown passes in each of his first 2 career starts. The last time a team won after committing 6 turnovers was on December 21, 1986, which coincidentally, also featured the Bears committing 6 turnovers in a 24-10 win against the Dallas Cowboys.

The postgame press conference was notable for Cardinals head coach Dennis Green's profanity-laced rant, highlighted by the quote "But they are who we thought they were! And we let 'em off the hook!". The game was ranked #6 on NFL Top 10 on NFL Network for Top Ten Greatest Comebacks of All Time under the title "Cardinals Blow It"/"Monday Night Meltdown", as well as Top Ten Meltdowns at #7.

== Background ==
=== Prelude ===
Before the meeting, the Bears led the series 56–36, which also includes the Bears as the Decatur Staleys and Chicago Staleys, as well as the Cardinals as the Chicago Cardinals and St. Louis Cardinals (the team was also briefly known as the Phoenix Cardinals). Earlier in the year, in the preseason, the Cardinals defeated the Bears at Soldier Field 23–16 in a Friday night game.

=== The Bears ===
The Bears were having a great season, being undefeated heading into the game at 5–0, having their best start to the season since 1989, having committed only 5 turnovers all season and averaging an NFL-best 31.2 points per game, and scoring 156 points compared to allowing only 36 points. This was the Bears' first Monday Night Football appearance since 2003. The Bears' third-year head coach Lovie Smith was having the best season start of his head coaching career, going 1–4 in 2004 and 2–3 in 2005 (despite making the playoffs in 2005), and notably defeated four of their first five opponents by more than 3 touchdowns (26–0 win against the Green Bay Packers, 34–7 win over the Detroit Lions, 37–6 win over the Seattle Seahawks, and 40–7 victory against the Buffalo Bills; their other game was a 19–16 win over the Minnesota Vikings). The team was led by the talented-yet-inconsistent quarterback Rex Grossman, running back Thomas Jones, wide receiver Muhsin Muhammad, linemen John Tait, Olin Kreutz, and Roberto Garza, defensive linemen Adewale Ogunleye, rookie Mark Anderson, who eventually recorded 12 sacks on the season, linebackers Brian Urlacher, Lance Briggs, and Brendon Ayanbadejo, rookie and future Hall of Famer and record holder for career returns for touchdowns and punt return touchdowns Devin Hester, a cornerbacking tandem in Charles Tillman and former record holder for the longest play in NFL history (broken by San Diego Chargers cornerback Antonio Cromartie) Nathan Vasher, Chris Harris, Mike Brown, and the 7th most accurate kicker in NFL history in Robbie Gould.

=== The Cardinals ===
The Cardinals, contrary to the Bears, were not having a good season, being 1–4 heading into the game, with their lone win being a Week 1 victory over the San Francisco 49ers, and mustering only 50 points while allowing 92 points. Dennis Green was leading the team, and was hoping for a win to snap their 4-game losing streak, as well as hopefully make the playoffs after going 5–11 the year before. The team's roster featured rookie quarterback and 2004 Heisman Trophy winner Matt Leinart, as well as rookie Leonard Pope, along with serious receiving threats in Anquan Boldin and Larry Fitzgerald, along with J. J. Arrington, running back Edgerrin James, Obafemi Ayanbadejo, brother of Brendon Ayanbadejo (both brothers played together with the Bears in the preseason in 2007), 3x Pro Bowler Darnell Dockett, Gerald Hayes, Orlando Huff, Calvin Pace, kicker Neil Rackers, as well as former MVP and Super Bowl XLIII quarterback Kurt Warner at backup.

== Game summary ==
The Bears won the toss, and elected to receive the kickoff. After the Bears went 3-and-out, the Cardinals scored on their first possession on a Matt Leinart pass to Bryant Johnson, with Leinart completing 9 of his first 10 passes. After the Cardinals threw an interception, which was eventually challenged and reversed before ultimately punting, Bears quarterback Rex Grossman threw an interception to Aaron Francisco. The Cardinals scored on their next possession on a Leinart pass to Anquan Boldin. At the end of the first quarter, the Cardinals led the Bears, 14–0.

In the second quarter, after exchanging punts, Grossman threw another interception, this time to Gerald Hayes. Neil Rackers missed a field goal on the ensuing possession. The Cardinals recovered two Grossman fumbles in the quarter, and scored field goals on each of the ensuing possessions, making the score 20–0.

In the third quarter, the Bears started their comeback with a Robbie Gould field goal. Neil Rackers responded with a field goal, which turned out to be the final score for the Cardinals. Near the end of the third quarter, Leinart was sacked by rookie Mark Anderson, and fumbled the ball. Safety Mike Brown recovered the fumble and returned it 3 yards for a touchdown with just two seconds left in the quarter, making the score 23–10.

After an exchange of punts, Grossman threw an interception to Dockett, who returned it 73 yards for a touchdown. However, the Bears challenged the play, claiming Dockett was down by contact. The touchdown was nullified, though the interception stood. On the Bears' next possession, Grossman threw another interception, this time to Robert Griffith. On the second play of the ensuing possession, Edgerrin James had the ball stripped by Brian Urlacher. Charles Tillman recovered the fumble and returned it 40 yards for a touchdown. With the score 23–17, rookie Devin Hester returned a punt 83-yards for a touchdown to take the lead 24–23. With a few seconds left in the game, Rackers set up for the game-winning field goal with less than a minute. After the Cardinals got into field goal range, Rackers, who missed only two field goals the season before, and already having made a 41-, 28- and 29-yard field goals, missed the 40-yard field goal, with the kick going wide left, with the ball possibly deflecting off linebacker Hunter Hillenmeyer's fingertips. The Bears took a knee to end the game, giving the Bears a 6–0 record, and dropping the Cardinals to a 1–5 record on the season.

The game also featured one of the best performances of Brian Urlacher's career, with 19 tackles and a forced fumble that was returned for a touchdown. Teammate Devin Hester commented on Urlacher's performance, stating, "We watched the film and everybody was saying that he just turned into the Incredible Hulk the last four minutes of the game, just killing people and running over and tackling whoever had the ball."

== Dennis Green post-game rant ==
"My doctor was very happy. He called me the next day, said: 'You know what? After that kind of game, (me) blowing up like that was a very good stress reliever', and my wife agreed."

— Dennis Green

After the loss, in the postgame press conference, Cardinals head coach Dennis Green lost his temper, letting out a profane meltdown about the fact that the Cardinals defeated the Bears in the preseason, and because of that, they were confident in beating them again, and that his team blew it after attacking the Bears' weaknesses, and also yanked the podium, destabilizing the microphone before storming out of the room. The rant's popularity led to it being featured in a Coors Light commercial the next season.

The Bears are what we thought they were. They're what we thought they were. We played them in preseason—who the hell takes a third game of the preseason like it's bullshit? Bullshit! We played them in the third game—everybody played three quarters—the Bears are who we thought they were! That's why we took the damn field. Now if you want to crown them, then crown their ass! But they are who we thought they were! And we let 'em off the hook!

— Cardinals head coach Dennis Green

One year after the tirade, Green explained the context around the tirade by stating, "We went against this team in preseason and they're exactly what we think they are, which is a one-dimensional team." Green and his staff devised strategies to score points against the Bears defense in preparation for the game. He was frustrated when the Bears won despite the initial success of his game plan.

== Aftermath ==
The Bears finished the season with a 13–3 record, losing only to the Miami Dolphins, New England Patriots, and Green Bay Packers, and met Peyton Manning and the Indianapolis Colts in Super Bowl XLI but lost, 29–17. The next season, the Bears sputtered to a 7–9 record. The game marked the beginning of the "good Rex/bad Rex" cycle, as quarterback Rex Grossman cycled between good performances vs bad performances. He was eventually benched in 2008 and released in 2009 and signed with the Houston Texans. (Coincidentally, Leinart was signed by them a season later.) Grossman eventually became the starting quarterback for the Washington Redskins. His last NFL start was in 2011 for the Redskins, after which he was a backup quarterback for the Redskins, Cleveland Browns, and Atlanta Falcons. Head coach Lovie Smith was fired after the Bears narrowly missed the playoffs at 10–6 following the 2012 season, and subsequently coached the Tampa Bay Buccaneers from 2014 to 2015 and the Houston Texans in 2022.

The Cardinals ultimately dropped to 5–11 at the end of the season, and Dennis Green was fired and was replaced by Ken Whisenhunt. Two seasons later, the Cardinals met the Pittsburgh Steelers in Super Bowl XLIII, but lost, 27–23, with Leinart having been benched at the start of the season in favor of veteran Kurt Warner. In 2010, despite Warner's retirement, Leinart was released by the Cardinals and was signed by the Texans, starting Leinart's change to being considered a journeyman quarterback and (given his draft position and expectations coming out of college) a draft bust. By 2013, Leinart was out of football altogether.

== Starting lineups ==
Chicago	Position	Position	Arizona
Offense
Muhsin Muhammad	WR		Anquan Boldin
John Tait	LT		Leonard Davis
Ruben Brown	LG		Reggie Wells
Olin Kreutz	C		Nick Leckey
Roberto Garza	RG		Milford Brown
Fred Miller	RT		Oliver Ross
Desmond Clark	TE		Eric Edwards
Bernard Berrian	WR		Bryant Johnson
Rex Grossman	QB		Matt Leinart
Jason McKie	FB		Obafemi Ayanbadejo
Thomas Jones	HB		Edgerrin James
Defense
Adewale Ogunleye	LE		Chike Okeafor
Tommie Harris	DT		Darnell Dockett
Tank Johnson	DT		Kendrick Clancy
Alex Brown	RE		Bertrand Berry
Brian Urlacher	MLB		Gerald Hayes
Lance Briggs	WLB		Orlando Huff
Hunter Hillenmeyer	SLB		Karlos Dansby
Charles Tillman	LCB		David Macklin
Nathan Vasher	RCB		Antrel Rolle
Danieal Manning	FS		Adrian Wilson
Chris Harris	SS		Robert Griffith
Special teams
Robbie Gould	K		Neil Rackers
Brad Maynard	P		Scott Player
Rashied Davis	KR		J. J. Arrington
Devin Hester	PR		Troy Walters
Patrick Mannelly	LS		Nathan Hodel

== Statistics ==
Source:	Chicago Bears	Arizona Cardinals
First downs	9	17
Third down efficiency	4/14	6/20
Fourth down efficiency	0/1	0/0
Total yards	168	286
Passing yards	130	220
Passing – completions/attempts	14/37	24/42
Rushing yards	38	66
Rushing attempts	16	38
Yards per rush	2.4	1.7
Penalties–yards	6–50	9–65
Sacks against–yards	2–14	1–12
Fumbles–lost	2–2	2–2
Interceptions thrown	4	0
Time of possession	20:17	39:43

=== Individual stats ===
Bears Passing
Player	C/ATT^{*}	Yds	TD	INT
Rex Grossman	14/37	144	0	4
Bears Rushing
Player	Car^{a}	Yds	TD	LG^{b}
Thomas Jones	11	43	0	11
Cedric Benson	1	4	0	4
Jason McKie	1	−2	0	−2
Rex Grossman	3	−7	0	−1
Bears Receiving
Player	Rec^{c}	Yds	TD	LG^{b}
Desmond Clark	4	61	0	26
Bernard Berrian	2	31	0	17
Rashied Davis	2	27	0	17
Thomas Jones	3	14	0	16
Cedric Benson	1	8	0	8
Muhsin Muhammad	1	2	0	2
Jason McKie	1	1	0	1
Bears Defense
Player	Tak/Ast/Tot^{t}	Int	Ff^{e}	Sck
Lance Briggs	13/2/15	0	0	0.0
Brian Urlacher	11/8/19	0	1	0.0
Nathan Vasher	6/3/9	0	0	0.0
Mike Brown	4/1/5	0	0	0.0
Charles Tillman	4/2/6	0	0	0.0
Alfonso Boone	3/1/4	0	0	0.0
Alex Brown	3/0/3	0	0	0.0
Hunter Hillenmeyer	3/1/4	0	0	0.0
Israel Idonije	3/0/3	0	0	0.0
Todd Johnson	2/0/2	0	0	0.0
Tank Johnson	2/0/2	0	0	0.0
Mark Anderson	2/0/2	0	1	1.0
Ricky Manning	2/2/4	0	0	0.0
Tommie Harris	1/2/3	0	0	0.0
Danieal Manning	1/1/2	0	0	0.0
Cameron Worrell	1/0/1	0	0	0.0
Bears Kicking
Player	FGA	FGM	XP	LG^{f}
Robbie Gould	1	1	3/3	23

Cardinals Passing
	C/ATT^{*}	Yds	TD	INT
Matt Leinart	24/42	232	2	0
Cardinals Rushing
Player	Car^{a}	Yds	TD	LG^{b}
Edgerrin James	36	55	0	12
J. J. Arrington	2	11	0	6
Cardinals Receiving
Player	Rec^{c}	Yds	TD	LG^{b}
Anquan Boldin	12	136	1	26 (TD)
Troy Walters	4	25	0	8
J. J. Arrington	2	22	0	12
Bryant Johnson	2	17	1	11 (TD)
Obafemi Ayanbadejo	2	16	0	13
Leonard Pope	1	9	0	9
Edgerrin James	1	7	0	7
Cardinals Defense
Player	Tak/Ast/Tot^{d}	Int	Ff^{e}	Sck
Gerald Hayes	6/1/7	1	0	0.0
Adrian Wilson	6/0/6	0	1	1.0
Karlos Dansby	4/0/4	0	0	0.0
Darnell Dockett	3/0/3	1	0	0.0
Eric Green	3/0/3	0	0	0.0
Bertrand Berry	3/0/3	0	01	1.0
Antrel Rolle	2/1/3	0	0	0.0
Orlando Huff	1/0/1	0	0	0.0
David Macklin	1/0/1	0	0	1.0
Gabe Watson	1/0/1	0	0	0.0
Aaron Francisco	1/0/1	1	0	0.0
Robert Griffith	1/1/2	1	0	0.0
Antonio Smith	0/1/1	0	0	0.0
Cardinals Kicking
Player	FGA	FGM	XP	LG^{f}
Neil Rackers	5	3	2/2	41

^{*}Completions/Attempts ^{a}Carries ^{b}Longest play ^{c}Receptions ^{d}Tackles ^{e}Forced Fumbles ^{f}Longest field goal

== Scoring summary ==
Quarter	1	2	3	4	Total
Bears	0	0	10	14	24
Cardinals	14	6	3	0	23

at University of Phoenix Stadium, Glendale, Arizona

- Game time: 8:30 p.m. EST
- Game weather: 73 °F (23 °C), clear

1ST QUARTER

- ARI TD: Bryant Johnson 11-yard pass from Matt Leinart ARI 7–0
- ARI TD: Anquan Boldin 26-yard pass from Leinart ARI 14–0

2ND QUARTER

- ARI FG: Neil Rackers 41-yard field goal ARI 17–0
- ARI FG: Rackers 28-yard field goal ARI 20–0

3RD QUARTER

- CHI FG: Robbie Gould 23-yard field goal ARI 20–3
- ARI FG: Rackers 29-yard field goal ARI 23–3
- CHI TD: Mike Brown 3-yard fumble return ARI 23–10

4TH QUARTER

- CHI TD: Charles Tillman 40-yard fumble return ARI 23–17
- CHI TD: Devin Hester 83-yard punt return CHI 24–23

== Officials ==
- Referee: Jerome Boger (#23)
- Umpire: Carl Madsen (#92)
- Head linesman: Ed Camp (#134)
- Line judge: Jeff Bergman (#32)
- Field judge: Scott Steenson (#88)
- Side judge: Joe Larrew (#73)
- Back judge: Perry Paganelli (#46)

== See also ==
- Bears–Cardinals rivalry
- 2006 Chicago Bears season
- 2006 Arizona Cardinals season
- The Comeback (American football)
- The Monday Night Miracle (American football)
