= 2006 Arizona Cardinals season =

NFL team season

- Owner: Bill Bidwill
- General manager: Rod Graves
- Head coach: Dennis Green
- Home stadium: University of Phoenix Stadium

Results
- Record: 5–11
- Division place: 4th NFC West
- Playoffs: Did not qualify
- Pro Bowlers: WR Anquan Boldin; SS Adrian Wilson

Uniform
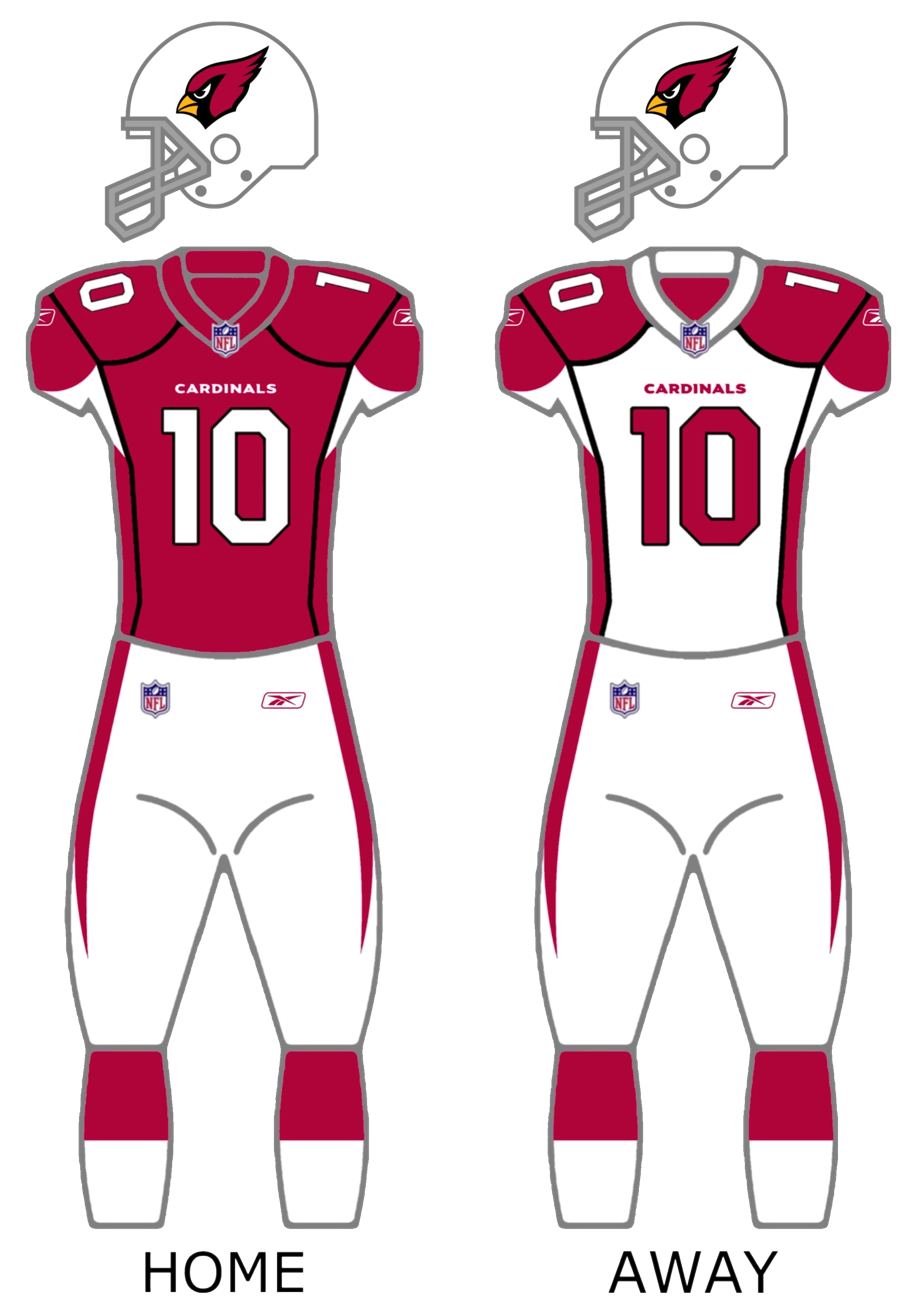

The 2006 season was the Arizona Cardinals' 87th in the National Football League (NFL), their 19th in Arizona and the third and final under head coach Dennis Green. The season began with the team trying to improve on their 5–11 record in 2005. They also moved into the Cardinals Stadium in Glendale, Arizona (one of the western suburbs of Phoenix), the first-ever stadium in the United States with a retractable playing surface. The stadium was christened University of Phoenix Stadium on September 26, and managed to sell out every home game. Despite a somewhat promising start, the team suffered a few setbacks, including key losses to the Dallas Cowboys and most memorably the eventual NFC Champion Chicago Bears, and ended the season (again) at a disappointing 5–11 record. Head coach Dennis Green was fired after the season, replaced by Ken Whisenhunt.

== Offseason ==
On March 12, 2006, the Cardinals acquired former Colts running back Edgerrin James through free agency, by signing him to a four-year, $30 million contract.

The Cardinals then selected the 2004 Heisman Trophy-winning quarterback Matt Leinart with the 10th pick of the 2006 NFL draft. Leinart played for the University of Southern California and won 1½ national championships with the team in 2003 and 2004.

Leinart missed the first two weeks of the 2006 Cardinals training camp (and the opening game of the preseason) due to prolonged contract negotiations, but on August 15, the Arizona Republic, KTAR radio and ESPN reported that Leinart agreed to a six-year contract that could earn him a maximum of $51 million, according to his agent, Tom Condon. The contract reportedly contained $14 million in guaranteed money, and involved "escalator" clauses to increase Leinart's salary in the later years of the deal should he meet certain playing-time incentives.

The Cardinals also selected another USC alum, guard Taitusi "Deuce" Lutui in the 3rd round, followed by Georgia tight end Leonard Pope, Michigan defensive tackle Gabriel Watson, Louisville linebacker Brandon Johnson, Virginia Tech defensive tackle Jonathan Lewis, and Brigham Young wide receiver Todd Watkins. This as well as the duo Anquan Boldin and Larry Fitzgerald at wide receiver, eventually made the Cardinals a serious threat in the NFC West.

=== Arizona Cardinals Draft ===
2006 Arizona Cardinals draft
Round	Pick	Player	Position	College	Notes
1	10	Matt Leinart	QB	USC	
2	41	Deuce Lutui	G	USC	
3	72	Leonard Pope	WR	Georgia	
4	107	Gabe Watson	DT	Michigan	
5	142	Brandon Johnson	LB	Louisville	
6	177	Jonathan Lewis	DT	Virginia Tech	
7	218	Todd Watkins	WR	BYU	
Made roster † Pro Football Hall of Fame * Made at least one Pro Bowl during career

== Personnel ==
2006 Arizona Cardinals staff
Front office: President – Bill Bidwill; Vice president and general counsel – Michael Bidwill; Vice president of football operations – Rod Graves; Senior director of football operations – John Idzik, Jr.; Director of college scouting – Steve Keim; Head coaches: Head coach – Dennis Green; Assistant head coach/linebackers – Frank Bush; Offensive coaches: Offensive coordinator – Keith Rowen; Quarterbacks/interim offensive coordinator – Mike Kruczek; Running backs – Kirby Wilson; Wide receivers – Mike Wilson; Tight ends – Carl Hargrave; Offensive line – Steve Loney; Offensive quality control – Bill Khayat	Defensive coaches: Defensive coordinator – Clancy Pendergast; Defensive line – Larry Brooks; Defensive backs – Richard Solomon; Defensive quality control – Rick Courtright; Special teams coaches: Special teams coordinator – Gary Zauner; Strength and conditioning: Strength and conditioning – Steve Wetzel; Assistant strength and conditioning – Daryl Lawrence; Assistant strength and conditioning – Keith Vulgamott

== Roster ==
2006 Arizona Cardinals roster
Quarterbacks (QB): 9 Shane Boyd; 7 Matt Leinart; 16 John Navarre; 13 Kurt Warner; Running backs (RB): 28 J. J. Arrington KR; 30 Obafemi Ayanbadejo; 32 Edgerrin James; 31 Marcel Shipp; Wide receivers (WR): 81 Anquan Boldin; 11 Larry Fitzgerald; 80 Bryant Johnson; 15 Micheal Spurlock KR; 14 Todd Watkins; Tight ends (TE): 39 John Bronson; 82 Leonard Pope; 87 Fred Wakefield	Offensive linemen (OL): 61 Elton Brown G; 67 Milford Brown G; 75 Leonard Davis T; 72 Brandon Gorin T; 60 Nick Leckey C; 63 Chris Liwienski G/T; 76 Deuce Lutui G; 79 Oliver Ross T; 71 Alex Stepanovich C; 74 Reggie Wells G/T; Defensive linemen (DL): 70 Kendrick Clancy DT; 93 Chris Cooper DE; 90 Darnell Dockett DT; 95 Jonathan Lewis DT; 56 Chike Okeafor DE; 96 A. J. Schable DE; 94 Antonio Smith DE/DT; 98 Gabe Watson DT	Linebackers (LB): 52 Monty Beisel MLB; 51 Darryl Blackstock OLB; 58 Karlos Dansby OLB; 54 Gerald Hayes MLB; 57 Orlando Huff OLB; 59 Brandon Johnson OLB; 97 Calvin Pace OLB; Defensive backs (DB): 47 Aaron Francisco SS; 25 Eric Green CB; 34 Robert Griffith FS; 21 Antrel Rolle CB; 23 Darrell Hunter CB; 37 Hanik Milligan FS; 37 Robert Tate CB; 22 Matt Ware CB/S; 24 Adrian Wilson SS; Special teams (ST): 1 Neil Rackers K; 10 Scott Player P; 48 Nathan Hodel LS	Practice squad: 36 Diamond Ferri RB; 53 Isaac Keys LB; 84 Greg Lee WR; 29 Justin Wyatt CB; Reserve: 89 Adam Bergen TE (IR); 92 Bertrand Berry DE (IR); 42 Jack Brewer S (IR); 69 Rolando Cantú G/T (IR); 51 James Darling LB (IR); 27 David Macklin CB (IR); 19 LeRon McCoy WR (IR); -- Anton Palepoi DE (IR); -- Roger Robinson RB (IR); 86 Troy Walters (IR); Rookies in italics 53 active, 10 reserve, 4 practice squad

== Schedule ==
In the 2006 regular season, the Cardinals' non-divisional, conference opponents were primarily from the NFC North, although they also played the Dallas Cowboys from the NFC East, and the Atlanta Falcons from the NFC South. Their non-conference opponents were from the AFC West.

Week	Date	Opponent	Result	Record	Venue	Attendance
1	September 10	**San Francisco 49ers**	**W** 34–27	1–0	Cardinals Stadium	63,407
2	September 17	at **Seattle Seahawks**	**L** 10–21	1–1	Qwest Field	67,470
3	September 24	**St. Louis Rams**	**L** 14–16	1–2	Cardinals Stadium	63,278
4	October 1	at Atlanta Falcons	**L** 10–32	1–3	Georgia Dome	68,981
5	October 8	Kansas City Chiefs	**L** 20–23	1–4	University of Phoenix Stadium	63,445
6	October 16	Chicago Bears	**L** 23–24	1–5	University of Phoenix Stadium	63,977
7	October 22	at Oakland Raiders	**L** 9–22	1–6	McAfee Coliseum	61,595
8	October 29	at Green Bay Packers	**L** 14–31	1–7	Lambeau Field	70,809
9	Bye					
10	November 12	Dallas Cowboys	**L** 10–27	1–8	University of Phoenix Stadium	63,926
11	November 19	Detroit Lions	**W** 17–10	2–8	University of Phoenix Stadium	63,348
12	November 26	at Minnesota Vikings	**L** 26–31	2–9	Hubert H. Humphrey Metrodome	63,483
13	December 3	at **St. Louis Rams**	**W** 34–20	3–9	Edward Jones Dome	65,612
14	December 10	**Seattle Seahawks**	**W** 27–21	4–9	University of Phoenix Stadium	63,603
15	December 17	Denver Broncos	**L** 20–37	4–10	University of Phoenix Stadium	63,845
16	December 24	at **San Francisco 49ers**	**W** 26–20	5–10	Monster Park	67,751
17	December 31	at San Diego Chargers	**L** 20–27	5–11	Qualcomm Stadium	66,492

Note: Intra-division opponents are in bold text.

== Standings ==
NFC West
	W	L	T	PCT	DIV	CONF	PF	PA	STK
^{(4)} Seattle Seahawks	9	7	0	.563	3–3	7–5	335	341	W1
St. Louis Rams	8	8	0	.500	2–4	6–6	367	381	W3
San Francisco 49ers	7	9	0	.438	3–3	5–7	298	412	W1
Arizona Cardinals	5	11	0	.313	4–2	5–7	314	389	L1

== Regular season ==
The Cardinals' Ring of Honor was started in 2006 to mark the opening of University of Phoenix Stadium. It honors former Cardinal greats from all eras of the franchise's history. Following is a list of inductees and the dates that they were inducted.

- Charles Bidwill, Owner (August 12, 2006)
- Jimmy Conzelman, Coach (August 12, 2006)
- Dan Dierdorf, Tackle (October 16, 2006)
- John "Paddy" Driscoll, Quarterback (August 12, 2006)
- Marshall Goldberg, Halfback (August 12, 2006)
- Dick "Night Train" Lane, Defensive Back (August 12, 2006)
- Ollie Matson, Halfback (August 12, 2006)
- Ernie Nevers, Fullback (August 12, 2006)
- Charley Trippi, Halfback/Quarterback (August 12, 2006)
- Roger Wehrli, Cornerback (October 14, 2007)
- Larry Wilson, Safety (September 10, 2006)
- Pat Tillman, Safety (November 12, 2006)

=== Week 1: vs. San Francisco 49ers ===
Week 1: San Francisco 49ers at Arizona Cardinals – Game summary

Quarter	1	2	3	4	Total
49ers	7	7	7	6	27
Cardinals	21	3	7	3	34

at Cardinals Stadium, Glendale, Arizona

- Date: September 10
- Game time: 1:15 p.m. MST
- Game weather: None (retractable roof closed)
- Game attendance: 63,407
- Referee: Ed Hochuli
- TV announcers (FOX): Josh Lewin, Bill Maas, Kevin McCabe
- Box Score

Game information

First quarter

- SF – Vernon Davis 31-yard pass from Alex Smith (Joe Nedney kick), 11:45. 49ers 7–0. Drive: 7 plays, 79 yards, 3:15.
- ARI – Troy Walters 2-yard pass from Kurt Warner (Neil Rackers kick), 7:52. Tied 7–7. Drive: 7 plays, 74 yards, 3:53.
- ARI – Edgerrin James 1-yard run (Neil Rackers kick), 5:51. Cardinals 14–7. Drive: 3 plays, 5 yards, 1:07.
- ARI – Anquan Boldin 6-yard pass from Kurt Warner (Neil Rackers kick), 0:59. Cardinals 21–7. Drive: 6 plays, 41 yards, 3:14.

Second quarter

- SF – Frank Gore 4-yard run (Joe Nedney kick), 13:34. Cardinals 21–14. Drive: 6 plays, 79 yards, 2:25.
- ARI – Neil Rackers 36-yard field goal, 4:42. Cardinals 24–14. Drive: 10 plays, 63 yards, 5:43.

Third quarter

- SF – Frank Gore 2-yard run (Joe Nedney kick), 7:41. Cardinals 24–21. Drive: 2 plays, 7 yards, 0:46.
- ARI – Adam Bergen 7-yard pass from Kurt Warner (Neil Rackers kick), 2:19. Cardinals 31–21. Drive: 10 plays, 86 yards, 5:22.

Fourth quarter

- SF – Joe Nedney 22-yard field goal, 8:52. Cardinals 31–24. Drive: 4 plays, 1 yards, 1:29.
- ARI – Neil Rackers 30-yard field goal, 1:50. Cardinals 34–24. Drive: 13 plays, 68 yards, 7:02.
- SF – Joe Nedney 44-yard field goal, 0:32. Cardinals 34–27. Drive: 6 plays, 44 yards, 1:18.

Top passers

- SF – Alex Smith – 23/40, 288 yards, TD
- ARI – Kurt Warner – 23/37, 301 yards, 3 TD

Top rushers

- SF – Frank Gore – 16 rushes, 87 yards, 2 TD
- ARI – Edgerrin James – 26 rushes, 73 yards, TD

Top receivers

- SF – Antonio Bryant – 4 receptions, 114 yards
- ARI – Larry Fitzgerald – 9 receptions, 133 yards

The Cardinals opened the regular season at home against the San Francisco 49ers on September 10. This game was the inaugural regular season game played at Cardinals Stadium. In the first quarter, 49ers quarterback Alex Smith and tight end Vernon Davis scored the inaugural regular season touchdown in the new stadium as they connected on a 31-yard pass. The Cardinals responded, as quarterback Kurt Warner threw the first touchdown pass by a Cardinals player in the new stadium on a 2-yard strike to wide receiver Troy Walters. Newly acquired running back Edgerrin James provided the first rushing touchdown in their new stadium on a 1-yard strike. Afterwards, Warner threw another touchdown pass, this time to wide receiver Anquan Boldin. In the second quarter, 49ers running back Frank Gore helped San Francisco get closer as he ran on a 4-yard touchdown play. Kicker Neil Rackers helped improve the Cardinals' lead, as he kicked a 36-yard field goal. In the third quarter, both sides each got a touchdown. San Francisco's Gore scored on a 2-yard run, while Arizona's Warner threw a 7-yard touchdown to tight end Adam Bergen. In the fourth quarter, it was all field goals to end the game, as 49ers kicker Joe Nedney kicked a 22-yard field goal. Then, Rackers helped Arizona on a 30-yard field goal. Even though Nedney kicked one more field goal for San Francisco (a 44-yarder), the Cardinals escaped with the win and a 1–0 start.

=== Week 2: at Seattle Seahawks ===
Week 2: Arizona Cardinals at Seattle Seahawks – Game summary

Quarter	1	2	3	4	Total
Cardinals	0	0	3	7	10
Seahawks	14	0	0	7	21

at Qwest Field, Seattle, Washington

- Date: September 17
- Game time: 1:05 p.m. MST and PDT
- Game weather: 61 °F (16 °C)
- Game attendance: 67,470
- Referee: Larry Nemmers
- TV announcers (FOX): Dick Stockton, Daryl Johnston, Tony Siragusa
- Box Score

Game information

First quarter

- SEA – Shaun Alexander 2-yard run (Josh Brown kick), 10:43. Seahawks 7–0. Drive: 10 plays, 80 yards, 4:17.
- SEA – Darrell Jackson 49-yard pass from Matt Hasselbeck (Josh Brown kick), 7:57. Seahawks 14–0. Drive: 7 plays, 74 yards, 3:44.

Second quarter

- No scoring plays

Third quarter

- ARI – Neil Rackers 43-yard field goal, 11:36. Seahawks 14–3. Drive: 5 plays, 17 yards, 2:33.

Fourth quarter

- SEA – Mack Strong 3-yard run (Josh Brown kick), 12:13. Seahawks 21–3. Drive: 11 plays, 80 yards, 4:33.
- ARI – Bryant Johnson 40-yard pass from Kurt Warner (Neil Rackers kick), 11:20. Seahawks 21–10. Drive: 8 plays, 72 yards, 3:02.

Top passers

- ARI – Kurt Warner – 24/38, 231 yards, TD, INT
- SEA – Matt Hasselbeck – 12/27, 221 yards, TD, 2 INT

Top rushers

- ARI – Edgerrin James – 18 rushes, 64 yards
- SEA – Shaun Alexander – 26 rushes, 89 yards, TD

Top receivers

- ARI – Anquan Boldin – 6 receptions, 62 yards
- SEA – Darrell Jackson – 5 receptions, 127 yards, TD

For Week 2, the Cardinals flew to the Northwest to take on the defending NFC Champion Seattle Seahawks. From the get-go, the Cardinals trailed, as the opposing running back Shaun Alexander scored a touchdown on a 2-yard run. Then, Arizona allowed opposing quarterback Matt Hasselbeck to complete a 49-yard touchdown pass to wide receiver Darrell Jackson. There wasn't any more scoring by either team for the remainder of the half. In the third quarter, the Cardinals finally got on the border with kicker Neil Rackers nailing a 43-yard field goal. However, Seattle managed to put the game away with fullback Mack Strong's 3-yard touchdown run. The Cardinals got a touchdown, with quarterback Kurt Warner completing a 40-yard pass to wide receiver Bryant Johnson, but the Seahawks were the better team and the Cardinals fell to 1–1.

=== Week 3: vs. St. Louis Rams ===
Week 3: St. Louis Rams at Arizona Cardinals – Game summary

Quarter	1	2	3	4	Total
Rams	0	13	3	0	16
Cardinals	7	0	0	7	14

at Cardinals Stadium, Glendale, Arizona

- Date: September 18
- Game time: 1:15 p.m. MST
- Game weather: None (retractable roof closed)
- Game attendance: 63,278
- Referee: Bill Carollo
- Box Score

Game information

First quarter

- ARI – Larry Fitzgerald 12-yard pass from Kurt Warner (Neil Rackers kick), 7:04. Cardinals 7–0. Drive: 8 plays, 45 yards, 4:17.

Second quarter

- STL – Jeff Wilkins 26-yard field goal, 11:25. Cardinals 7–3. Drive: 11 plays, 72 yards, 3:35.
- STL – Torry Holt 9-yard pass from Marc Bulger (Jeff Wilkins kick), 3:20. Rams 10–7. Drive: 5 plays, 94 yards, 2:54.
- STL – Jeff Wilkins 47-yard field goal, 0:00. Rams 13–7. Drive: 8 plays, 16 yards, 3:05.

Third quarter

- STL – Jeff Wilkins 21-yard field goal, 8:08. Rams 16–7. Drive: 13 plays, 77 yards, 6:52.

Fourth quarter

- ARI – Edgerrin James 6-yard run (Neil Rackers kick), 4:13. Rams 16–14. Drive: 16 plays, 87 yards, 8:24.

Top passers

- STL – Marc Bulger – 21/31, 309 yards, TD
- ARI – Kurt Warner – 19/28, 256 yards, TD, 3 INT

Top rushers

- STL – Steven Jackson – 24 rushes, 62 yards
- ARI – Edgerrin James – 24 rushes, 94 yards, TD

Top receivers

- STL – Torry Holt – 8 receptions, 120 yards, TD
- ARI – Anquan Boldin – 10 receptions, 129 yards

The Cardinals returned home to face their third NFC West opponent, the St. Louis Rams. Quarterback Kurt Warner drew first blood against his former team, as completed a 12-yard touchdown strike to wide receiver Larry Fitzgerald for the only score of the first quarter. However, in the second quarter, it was all St. Louis. Kicker Jeff Wilkins got a 26-yard field goal, quarterback Marc Bulger completed a 9-yard pass to wide receiver Torry Holt, and Wilkens got a 47-yard field goal as time ran out on the first half. In the third quarter, Wilkens helped the Rams increase their lead with a 21-yard field goal, which was the only score of the third quarter. In the fourth quarter, even a valiant effort for a comeback, the only score that Arizona could muster was a 6-yard touchdown run by running back Edgerrin James. After a Bulger fumble deep in St. Louis territory while trying to run out the clock set up the Cardinals for an easy chip shot field goal to win, Warner fumbled a snap and St. Louis recovered to seal the victory. Adding to Warner's three interceptions, the Cardinals got their first loss in their new stadium as they fell to 1–2. A few days afterward, ESPN reported that rookie quarterback Matt Leinart would be starting the next game. However, the next day, Arizona's head coach announced that the club would be sticking with the veteran Warner.

=== Week 4: at Atlanta Falcons ===
Week 4: Arizona Cardinals at Atlanta Falcons – Game summary

Quarter	1	2	3	4	Total
Cardinals	3	7	0	0	10
Falcons	6	6	10	10	32

at Georgia Dome, Atlanta, Georgia

- Date: October 1
- Game time: 1:00 p.m. EDT/10:00 a.m. MST
- Game weather: None (indoor stadium)
- Game attendance: 68,981
- Referee: Gene Steratore
- Box Score

Game information

First quarter

- ATL – Morten Andersen 34-yard field goal, 10:55. Falcons 3–0. Drive: 4 plays, 8 yards, 2:21.
- ATL – Morten Andersen 40-yard field goal, 8:19. Falcons 6–0. Drive: 5 plays, 27 yards, 1:34.
- ARI – Neil Rackers 29-yard field goal, 2:30. Falcons 6–3. Drive: 12 plays, 71 yards, 5:49.

Second quarter

- ATL – Michael Koenen 51-yard field goal, 14:45. Falcons 9–3. Drive: 8 plays, 34 yards, 2:45.
- ARI – Adrian Wilson 99-yard interception return (Neil Rackers kick), 5:59. Cardinals 10–9.
- ATL – Morten Andersen 36-yard field goal, 0:10. Falcons 12–10. Drive: 11 plays, 73 yards, 3:16.

Third quarter

- ATL – Morten Andersen 26-yard field goal, 7:08. Falcons 15–10. Drive: 16 plays, 67 yards, 7:52.
- ATL – DeAngelo Hall 37-yard interception return (Morten Andersen kick), 4:59. Falcons 22–10.

Fourth quarter

- ATL – Jerious Norwood 78-yard run (Morten Andersen kick), 13:18. Falcons 29–10. Drive: 1 play, 78 yards, 0:12.
- ATL – Morten Andersen 28-yard field goal, 11:00. Falcons 32–10. Drive: 4 plays, 4 yards, 1:30.

Top passers

- ARI – Kurt Warner – 11/20, 128 yards, INT
- ATL – Michael Vick – 13/22, 153 yards, INT

Top rushers

- ARI – Edgerrin James – 20 rushes, 41 yards
- ATL – Jerious Norwood – 6 rushes, 106 yards, TD

Top receivers

- ARI – Larry Fitzgerald – 4 receptions, 71 yards
- ATL – Ashley Lelie – 2 receptions, 61 yards

Hoping to recover from a two-game skid, the Cardinals flew to the Georgia Dome for a Week 4 match-up with the Atlanta Falcons. From the get-go, the Cardinals trailed, as Falcons kicker Morten Andersen completed a 34-yard and a 40-yard field goal in the opening period. The Cardinals responded with a 29-yard field goal by kicker Neil Rackers. In the second quarter, Arizona continued to trail, as Koenan belted a 51-yard field goal for Atlanta. The Cardinals struck back with strong safety Adrian Wilson returning an interception 99 yards for a touchdown, but that was the only time that the Cardinals saw the lead, as Andersen got a 36-yard field goal to give the Falcons the lead at halftime. In the second half, the Cardinals got shot down and shut-out, as Atlanta scored 20 unanswered points (Andersen's 26-yard field goal, cornerback DeAngelo Hall's 37-yard interception return in the third quarter, rookie running back Jerious Norwood's 78-yard touchdown run and Andersen's 28-yard field goal in the fourth quarter). Not even quarterback Matt Leinart, who replaced quarterback Kurt Warner in the fourth quarter, could save Arizona from dropping their third straight game, as the Cardinals fell to 1–3. The game showed just how much the Cardinals had to improve their offensive line, as they were whipped for the whole game by the Falcons defensive line.

=== Week 5: vs. Kansas City Chiefs ===
Week 5: Kansas City Chiefs at Arizona Cardinals – Game summary

Quarter	1	2	3	4	Total
Chiefs	0	10	0	13	23
Cardinals	14	3	3	0	20

at University of Phoenix Stadium, Glendale, Arizona

- Date: October 8
- Game time: 1:05 p.m. MST
- Game weather: None (retractable roof closed)
- Game attendance: 63,445
- Referee: Terry McAulay
- TV announcers (CBS): Ian Eagle, Solomon Wilcots
- Box Score

Game information

First quarter

- ARI – Anquan Boldin 49-yard pass from Matt Leinart (Neil Rackers kick), 12:19. Cardinals 7–0. Drive: 5 plays, 60 yards, 2:41.
- ARI – Larry Fitzgerald 5-yard pass from Matt Leinart (Neil Rackers kick), 6:12. Cardinals 14–0. Drive: 7 plays, 41 yards, 3:19.

Second quarter

- KC – Lawrence Tynes 45-yard field goal, 12:01. Cardinals 14–3. Drive: 8 plays, 25 yards, 3:48
- KC – Larry Johnson 9-yard pass from Damon Huard (Lawrence Tynes kick), 3:26. Cardinals 14–10. Drive: 3 plays, 6 yards, 0:57.
- ARI – Neil Rackers 41-yard field goal, 0:42. Cardinals 17–10. Drive: 4 plays, 9 yards, 0:50.

Third quarter

- ARI – Neil Rackers 45-yard field goal, 10:06. Cardinals 20–10. Drive: 6 plays, 42 yards, 3:31.

Fourth quarter

- KC – Samie Parker 15-yard pass from Damon Huard (Lawrence Tynes kick), 9:35. Cardinals 20–17. Drive: 7 plays, 66 yards, 4:04.
- KC – Lawrence Tynes 40-yard field goal, 5:06. Tied 20–20. Drive: 4 plays, 0 yards, 0:47.
- KC – Lawrence Tynes 19-yard field goal, 1:36. Chiefs 23–20. Drive: 5 plays, 85 yards, 0:55.

Top passers

- KC – Damon Huard – 26/38, 288 yards, 2 TD
- ARI – Matt Leinart – 22/35, 253 yards, 2 TD, INT

Top rushers

- KC – Larry Johnson – 16 rushes, 36 yards
- ARI – Edgerrin James – 24 rushes, 71 yards

Top receivers

- KC – Larry Johnson – 6 receptions, 106 yards, TD
- ARI – Bryant Johnson – 6 receptions, 82 yards

The Cardinals hosted a close contest with the Kansas City Chiefs. The game was the first at the newly christened University of Phoenix Stadium, which signed its naming rights deal with the Cardinals two days after Arizona's last home game versus St. Louis. The Cardinals started off hot as Matt Leinart, making his first NFL start, threw two touchdowns in the first quarter to his two top targets, Anquan Boldin and Larry Fitzgerald. The Chiefs responded early in the second quarter with a 45-yard field goal by kicker Lawrence Tynes, and a touchdown pass from quarterback Damon Huard to running back Larry Johnson. Cards kicker Neil Rackers added a 41-yard field at the end of the first half. Another Rackers field goal, this time from 45 yards, accounted for the only score in the third quarter. The Chiefs then scored 13 unanswered points to win the game, with a touchdown pass from Huard to Samie Parker, and two field goals by Tynes (40, 19). Tynes' last field goal was set up by a 78-yard screen pass from Huard to Johnson. Johnson suffered a sprained neck at the end of the play on a violent face mask tackle by Cardinals' cornerback Antrel Rolle, who was fined $12,500 for the penalty. A last second 51-yard field goal attempt by Rackers to send the game to overtime failed, giving the Cardinals their fourth straight loss. During the game Larry Fitzgerald pulled a hamstring and missed 3 games, returning Week 10 against Dallas.

=== Week 6: vs. Chicago Bears ===
Week 6: Chicago Bears at Arizona Cardinals – Game summary

Quarter	1	2	3	4	Total
Bears	0	0	10	14	24
Cardinals	14	6	3	0	23

at University of Phoenix Stadium, Glendale, Arizona

- Date: October 16
- Game time: 5:40 p.m. MST
- Game weather: 73 °F (23 °C) (retractable roof open)
- Game attendance: 63,977
- Referee: Jerome Boger
- TV announcers (ESPN): Mike Tirico, Joe Theismann, and Tony Kornheiser
- Box Score

Game information

First quarter

- ARI – Bryant Johnson 11-yard pass from Matt Leinart (Neil Rackers kick), 7:06. Cardinals 7–0. Drive: 12 plays, 77 yards, 6:52.
- ARI – Anquan Boldin 26-yard pass from Matt Leinart (Neil Rackers kick), 0:54. Cardinals 14–0. Drive: 3 plays, 25 yards, 1:32.

Second quarter

- ARI – Neil Rackers 41-yard field goal, 4:15. Cardinals 17–0. Drive: 7 plays, 10 yards, 3:50.
- ARI – Neil Rackers 28-yard field goal, 0:00. Cardinals 20–0. Drive: 5 plays, 22 yards, 2:10.

Third quarter

- CHI – Robbie Gould 23-yard field goal, 7:22. Cardinals 20–3. Drive: 13 plays, 64 yards, 5:49.
- ARI – Neil Rackers 29-yard field goal, 1:47. Cardinals 23–3. Drive: 13 plays, 49 yards, 5:35.
- CHI – Mike Brown 3-yard fumble return (Robbie Gould kick), 0:02. Cardinals 23–10.

Fourth quarter

- CHI – Charles Tillman 40-yard fumble return (Robbie Gould kick), 5:00. Cardinals 23–17.
- CHI – Devin Hester 83-yard punt return (Robbie Gould kick), 2:58. Bears 24–23.

Top passers

- CHI – Rex Grossman – 14/37, 144 yards, 4 INT
- ARI – Matt Leinart – 24/42, 232 yards, 2 TD

Top rushers

- CHI – Thomas Jones – 11 rushes, 43 yards
- ARI – Edgerrin James – 36 rushes, 55 yards

Top receivers

- CHI – Desmond Clark – 4 receptions, 61 yards
- ARI – Anquan Boldin – 12 receptions, 136 yards, TD

The Cardinals came out smoking early as quarterback Matt Leinart for the second straight week threw two touchdown passes in the first quarter, connecting with wide receivers Bryant Johnson and Anquan Boldin. Cardinals kicker Neil Rackers converted field goals of 41 and 28 yards respectively to give the Cardinals a seemingly insurmountable 20–0 halftime lead. During a halftime ceremony former St. Louis Cardinals tackle Dan Dierdorf was inducted into the stadium's ring of honor. The Cardinals held Bears quarterback Rex Grossman in check, forcing him into six turnovers (four interceptions and two fumbles). Bears kicker Robbie Gould drilled a 23-yard field goal midway through the third quarter for the Bears' only offensive points of the night. Cardinals kicker Rackers responded with a 29-yard field goal of his own to extend the lead to 23–3. The Bears went on to score 21 unanswered points on defense and special teams, two fumble recoveries by Mike Brown and Charles Tillman respectively, and an 82-yard punt return touchdown by rookie Devin Hester. Cardinals kicker Rackers was set up to win the game with a 40-yard field goal in the waning minutes, but the kick sailed wide left and they dropped to 1–5 on the season.

The loss marked the first time in history that a team blew a 20-point lead to an opponent who did not score any offensive touchdowns. At the post-game press conference, head coach Dennis Green erupted at reporters. "The Bears are who we thought they were! That's why we took the damn field! Now, if you want to crown them, then crown their ass! But they are who we thought they were, and we let them off the hook!" He then smacked the microphone before storming out of the room. The clip quickly became a highlight of sports shows and popular online. (An edited version of the clip was being used in current Coors Light advertisements). Chicago Bears quarterback Rex Grossman told Cardinals quarterback Matt Leinart after the game that Arizona deserved to have won that game.

=== Week 7: at Oakland Raiders ===
Week 7: Arizona Cardinals at Oakland Raiders – Game summary

Quarter	1	2	3	4	Total
Cardinals	0	3	3	3	9
Raiders	14	3	5	0	22

at McAfee Coliseum, Oakland, California

- Date: October 22
- Game time: 1:15 p.m. MST and PDT
- Game weather: 67 °F (19 °C)
- Game attendance: 61,595
- Referee: Bill Vinovich
- TV announcers (FOX): Matt Devlin, Tony Siragusa
- Box Score

Game information

First quarter

- OAK – ReShard Lee 1-yard run (Sebastian Janikowski kick), 4:25. Raiders 7–0. Drive: 11 plays, 61 yards, 5:15.
- OAK – Randy Moss 32-yard pass from Andrew Walter (Sebastian Janikowski kick), 3:30. Raiders 14–0. Drive: 1 play, 32 yards, 0:08.

Second quarter

- OAK – Sebastian Janikowski 31-yard field goal, 14:50. Raiders 17–0. Drive: 6 plays, 23 yards, 1:40.
- ARI – Neil Rackers 29-yard field goal, 6:00. Raiders 17–3. Drive: 6 plays, 21 yards, 2:41.

Third quarter

- OAK – Sebastian Janikowski 35-yard field goal, 6:50. Raiders 20–3. Drive: 10 plays, 53 yards, 3:55.
- OAK – Team safety, 5:46. Raiders 22–3.
- ARI – Neil Rackers 45-yard field goal, 3:03. Raiders 22–6. Drive: 5 plays, 17 yards, 2:28.

Fourth quarter

- ARI – Neil Rackers 38-yard field goal, 10:07. Raiders 22–9. Drive: 9 plays, 76 yards, 3:58.

Top passers

- ARI – Matt Leinart – 13/32, 203 yards, 2 INT
- OAK – Andrew Walter – 17/30, 263 yards, TD, INT

Top rushers

- ARI – Edgerrin James – 13 rushes, 34 yards
- OAK – Justin Fargas – 23 rushes, 66 yards

Top receivers

- ARI – Bryant Johnson – 3 receptions, 87 yards
- OAK – Randy Moss – 7 receptions, 129 yards, TD

Hoping to end their horrendous five-game skid, the Cardinals traveled to McAfee Coliseum to face the Oakland Raiders. The Raiders came into the game at 0–5, the only winless team in the NFL. This was the Cardinals’ first game under new offensive coordinator Mike Kruczek, who replaced the fired Keith Rowen in the wake of Arizona's meltdown in the fourth quarter of the game against Chicago.

Arizona had visited Oakland only once before. The Cardinals won 34–31 on an overtime field goal by Bill Gramatica on December 2, 2001. The Raiders won the last meeting with the Cardinals, 41–20 at Sun Devil Stadium on November 24, 2002.

In the first quarter, the Cardinals' string of bad luck continued to haunt them, as Raiders running back ReShard Lee got a 1-yard touchdown run, while quarterback Andrew Walter threw a 32-yard touchdown pass to wide receiver Randy Moss. In the second quarter, both teams swapped field goals. Oakland kicker Sebastian Janikowski got a 31-yard field goal, while Arizona kicker Neil Rackers nailed a 29-yard try. In the third quarter, the Raiders continued to pour on the points, as Janikowski got a 35-yard field goal, while defensive tackle Terdell Sands tackles Cardinals running back Marcel Shipp at the goal line for a safety. The only response Arizona could bring up was Rackers kicking a 45-yard field goal. He kicked one more in the fourth quarter (38-yarder), but that was all that the Cardinals produced as they dropped their sixth straight game.

=== Week 8: at Green Bay Packers ===
Week 8: Arizona Cardinals at Green Bay Packers – Game summary

Quarter	1	2	3	4	Total
Cardinals	0	7	7	0	14
Packers	7	14	7	3	31

at Lambeau Field, Green Bay, Wisconsin

- Date: October 22
- Game time: 12:00 p.m. CDT/10:00 a.m. MST
- Game weather: 45 °F (7 °C)
- Game attendance: 70,809
- Referee: Bill Leavy
- TV announcers (FOX): Ron Pitts, Terry Donahue
- Box Score

Game information

First quarter

- GB – David Martin 1-yard pass from Brett Favre (Dave Rayner kick), 5:05. Packers 7–0. Drive: 9 plays, 88 yards, 4:37.

Second quarter

- GB – Ahman Green 4-yard run (Dave Rayner kick), 14:22. Packers 14–0. Drive: 9 plays, 70 yards, 3:19.
- GB – Ahman Green 2-yard run (Dave Rayner kick), 6:24. Packers 21–0. Drive: 9 plays, 87 yards, 3:25.
- ARI – Edgerrin James 1-yard run (Neil Rackers kick), 0:29. Packers 21–7. Drive: 14 plays, 84 yards, 5:55.

Third quarter

- GB – Brett Favre 1-yard run (Dave Rayner kick), 7:41. Packers 28–7. Drive: 13 plays, 74 yards, 7:19.
- ARI – Troy Walters 17-yard pass from Matt Leinart (Neil Rackers kick), 1:33. Packers 28–14. Drive: 13 plays, 59 yards, 6:08.

Fourth quarter

- GB – Dave Rayner 42-yard field goal, 6:56. Packers 31–14. Drive: 10 plays, 47 yards, 6:18.

Top passers

- ARI – Matt Leinart – 14/35, 157 yards, TD, INT
- GB – Brett Favre – 17/25, 180 yards, TD

Top rushers

- ARI – Edgerrin James – 24 rushes, 84 yards, TD
- GB – Ahman Green – 21 rushes, 106 yards, 2 TD

Top receivers

- ARI – Troy Walters – 5 receptions, 54 yards, TD
- GB – Donald Driver – 5 receptions, 48 yards

The Cards visited Lambeau Field in Green Bay, Wisconsin to take on the Packers. Arizona had not visited Lambeau Field since a 49–24 loss in the final game of the 1999 season on January 2, 2000. The Cardinals defeated the Packers 20–13 in the last meeting between the teams on September 21, 2003, at Sun Devil Stadium. Their 2003 victory stayed as a memory, as the Cardinals dropped their seventh straight game, heading into their bye week at 1–7.

In the wake of this loss, concern for the remainder of the once-promising season was so strong, defensive end Bertrand Berry led a players-only meeting at the Cardinals HQ in Tempe on November 7. Some days earlier, Berry openly questioned his teammates' commitment to success during an interview on a local radio program.

=== Week 10: vs. Dallas Cowboys ===
Week 10: Dallas Cowboys at Arizona Cardinals – Game summary

Quarter	1	2	3	4	Total
Cowboys	3	10	7	7	27
Cardinals	0	3	0	7	10

at University of Phoenix Stadium, Glendale, Arizona

- Date: November 12
- Game time: 2:15 p.m. MST
- Game weather: (retractable roof open)
- Game attendance: 63,926
- Referee: Mike Carey
- Box Score

Game information

First quarter

- DAL – Mike Vanderjagt 28-yard field goal, 0:37. Cowboys 3–0. Drive: 13 plays, 63 yards, 5:55.

Second quarter

- DAL – Patrick Crayton 30-yard pass from Tony Romo (Mike Vanderjagt kick), 8:33. Cowboys 10–0. Drive: 7 plays, 78 yards, 3:15.
- ARI – Neil Rackers 28-yard field goal, 3:31. Cowboys 10–3. Drive: 13 plays, 65 yards, 5:02.
- DAL – Mike Vanderjagt 38-yard field goal, 0:00. Cowboys 13–3. Drive: 11 plays, 60 yards, 3:31.

Third quarter

- DAL – Terrell Owens 51-yard pass from Tony Romo (Mike Vanderjagt kick), 5:15. Cowboys 20–3. Drive: 1 play, 51 yards, 0:08.

Fourth quarter

- DAL – Marion Barber III 5-yard run (Mike Vanderjagt kick), 14:17. Cowboys 27–3. Drive: 6 plays, 39 yards, 2:59.
- ARI – Matt Leinart 3-yard run (Neil Rackers kick), 11:53. Cowboys 27–10. Drive: 6 plays, 78 yards, 2:24.

Top passers

- DAL – Tony Romo – 20/29, 308 yards, 2 TD
- ARI – Matt Leinart – 20/38, 216 yards, 2 INT

Top rushers

- DAL – Marion Barber III – 13 rushes, 65 yards, TD
- ARI – Edgerrin James – 15 rushes, 68 yards

Top receivers

- DAL – Patrick Crayton – 5 receptions, 104 yards, TD
- ARI – Larry Fitzgerald – 6 receptions, 80 yards

Coming off their bye week, the Cardinals went home for a Week 10 fight with their former rival the Dallas Cowboys. In the first quarter, Arizona trailed early as kicker Mike Vanderjagt nailed a 28-yard field goal for the only score of the period. In the second quarter, the Cardinals' year-long struggles continued as quarterback Tony Romo completed a 30-yard touchdown pass to wide receiver Patrick Crayton. The Cardinals responded with a 28-yard field goal by kicker Neil Rackers. Afterwards, Vanderjagt gave the Cowboys some breathing room with a 38-yard field goal as time ran out on the half. In the third quarter, things continued to get worse for Arizona as Romo completed a 51-yard touchdown pass to wide receiver Terrell Owens for the only score of the period. In the fourth quarter, Dallas wrapped up the game with running back Marion Barber's 5-yard touchdown run. The Cardinals got a touchdown as quarterback Matt Leinart got a 3-yard touchdown run. However, the Cardinals dropped their eighth straight game and fell to 1–8.

=== Week 11: vs. Detroit Lions ===
Week 11: Detroit Lions at Arizona Cardinals – Game summary

Quarter	1	2	3	4	Total
Lions	0	0	3	7	10
Cardinals	0	10	7	0	17

at University of Phoenix Stadium, Glendale, Arizona

- Date: November 12
- Game time: 2:05 p.m. MST
- Game weather: None (retractable roof closed)
- Game attendance: 63,348
- Referee: Scott Green
- Box Score

Game information

First quarter

- No scoring plays

Second quarter

- ARI – Bryant Johnson 2-yard pass from Matt Leinart (Neil Rackers kick), 6:28. Cardinals 7–0. Drive: 11 plays, 88 yards, 6:39.
- ARI – Neil Rackers 36-yard field goal, 1:53. Cardinals 10–0. Drive: 7 plays, 68 yards, 3:01.

Third quarter

- ARI – Matt Leinart 9-yard run (Neil Rackers kick), 11:57. Cardinals 17–0. Drive: 6 plays, 86 yards, 3:03.
- DET – Jason Hanson 32-yard field goal, 2:50. Cardinals 17–3. Drive: 15 plays, 66 yards, 9:07.

Fourth quarter

- DET – Arlen Harris 1-yard run (Jason Hanson kick), 4:35. Cardinals 17–10. Drive: 14 plays, 97 yards, 5:14.

Top passers

- DET – Jon Kitna – 23/38, 248 yards, INT
- ARI – Matt Leinart – 19/29, 233 yards, TD

Top rushers

- DET – Arlen Harris – 10 rushes, 40 yards, TD
- ARI – Edgerrin James – 22 rushes, 96 yards

Top receivers

- DET – Mike Furrey – 6 receptions, 67 yards
- ARI – Anquan Boldin – 5 receptions, 87 yards

Trying to end their eight-game skid, the Cardinals stayed at home for a Week 11 fight with the Detroit Lions. After a scoreless first quarter, the Cardinals struck first in the second quarter with quarterback Matt Leinart completing a 2-yard touchdown pass to wide receiver Bryant Johnson. Afterwards, kicker Neil Rackers nailed a 36-yard field goal for Arizona. In the third quarter, Leinart scored on a 9-yard run to give the Cardinals a 17–0 lead. However, the Lions started to creep back into the game. It started with kicker Jason Hanson's 32-yard field goal. In the fourth quarter, Detroit started to threaten Arizona's lead as running back Arlen Harris got a 1-yard touchdown run. The Cardinals' defense held up for the win. Not only did the Cardinals improve to 2–8, but they also snapped their eight-game losing streak.

=== Week 12: at Minnesota Vikings ===
Week 12: Arizona Cardinals at Minnesota Vikings – Game summary

Quarter	1	2	3	4	Total
Cardinals	7	6	0	13	26
Vikings	7	7	10	7	31

at Hubert H. Humphrey Metrodome, Minneapolis, Minnesota

- Date: November 26
- Game time: 12:05 p.m. CST/11:05 a.m. MST
- Game weather: None (indoor stadium)
- Game attendance: 63,483
- Referee: Jerome Boger
- TV announcers (Fox): Matt Vasgersian and J.C. Pearson
- Box Score

Game information

First quarter

- ARI – J.J. Arrington 99-yard kickoff return (Neil Rackers kick), 14:44. Cardinals 7–0.
- MIN – Chester Taylor 1-yard run (Ryan Longwell kick), 9:42. Tied 7–7. Drive: 9 plays, 70 yards, 5:02.

Second quarter

- ARI – Neil Rackers 21-yard field goal, 13:28. Cardinals 10–7. Drive: 9 plays, 77 yards, 3:04.
- ARI – Neil Rackers 50-yard field goal, 3:48. Cardinals 13–7. Drive: 11 plays, 57 yards, 4:40.
- MIN – Marcus Robinson 17-yard pass from Brad Johnson (Ryan Longwell kick), 0:31. Vikings 14–13. Drive: 11 plays, 80 yards, 3:17.

Third quarter

- MIN – Billy McMullen 9-yard pass from Brad Johnson (Ryan Longwell kick), 10:37. Vikings 21–13. Drive: 10 plays, 80 yards, 4:23.
- MIN – Ryan Longwell 40-yard field goal, 6:38. Vikings 24–13. Drive: 9 plays, 32 yards, 3:28.

Fourth quarter

- MIN – Jeff Dugan 3-yard pass from Brad Johnson (Ryan Longwell kick), 12:00. Vikings 31–13. Drive: 7 plays, 35 yards, 3:02.
- ARI – Adrian Wilson 99-yard fumble return (pass failed), 10:08. Vikings 31–19.
- ARI – Anquan Boldin 9-yard pass from Matt Leinart (Neil Rackers kick), 0:39. Vikings 31–26. Drive: 9 plays, 53 yards, 1:10.

Top passers

- ARI – Matt Leinart – 31/51, 405 yards, TD, 2 INT
- MIN – Brad Johnson – 27/41, 271 yards, 3 TD

Top rushers

- ARI – Edgerrin James – 4 rushes, 15 yards
- MIN – Chester Taylor – 27 rushes, 136 yards, TD

Top receivers

- ARI – Larry Fitzgerald – 11 receptions, 172 yards
- MIN – Marcus Robinson – 7 receptions, 82 yards, TD

Coming off of their home win over the Lions, the Cardinals flew to the Hubert H. Humphrey Metrodome for a Week 12 fight with the Minnesota Vikings. This game was noted for the return of head coach Dennis Green to Minnesota where he coached from 1992 to 2001. On the very first play of the first quarter, running back J.J. Arrington returned a kickoff 99 yards for a touchdown. The Vikings responded with running back Chester Taylor's 1-yard touchdown run. In the second quarter, Cardinals kicker Neil Rackers gave Arizona a 21-yard and a 50-yard field goal for a decent lead. However, the Vikings took the lead with quarterback Brad Johnson's 17-yard touchdown pass to wide receiver Marcus Robinson. In the third quarter, more of the Cardinals' year-long ineffectiveness showed as Johnson completed a 9-yard touchdown pass to wide receiver Billy McMullen, while kicker Ryan Longwell nailed a 40-yard field goal. In the fourth quarter, Minnesota improved its lead on Johnson's 3-yard touchdown pass to fullback Jeff Dugan. Afterwards, Arizona tried to fight back as strong safety Adrian Wilson returned a fumble 99 yards for a touchdown, yet it was followed up by a failed two-point conversion. Afterwards, quarterback Matt Leinart completed a 9-yard touchdown pass to wide receiver Anquan Boldin. Afterwards, the Vikings wrapped up the game and won. With the loss, the Cardinals fell to 2–9.

=== Week 13: at St. Louis Rams ===
Week 13: Arizona Cardinals at St. Louis Rams – Game summary

Quarter	1	2	3	4	Total
Cardinals	7	10	7	10	34
Rams	3	0	7	10	20

at Edward Jones Dome, St. Louis, Missouri

- Date: December 3
- Game time: 12:00 p.m. CST/11:00 a.m. MST
- Game weather: None (indoor stadium)
- Game attendance: 65,612
- Referee: Ron Winter
- Box Score

Game information

First quarter

- ARI – Marcel Shipp 1-yard run (Neil Rackers kick), 7:38. Cardinals 7–0. Drive: 13 plays, 90 yards, 7:22.
- STL – Jeff Wilkins 27-yard field goal, 1:02. Cardinals 7–3. Drive: 13 plays, 64 yards, 6:36.

Second quarter

- ARI – Larry Fitzgerald 11-yard pass from Matt Leinart (Neil Rackers kick), 5:49. Cardinals 14–3. Drive: 4 plays, 50 yards, 2:38.
- ARI – Neil Rackers 23-yard field goal, 0:18. Cardinals 17–3. Drive: 6 plays, 29 yards, 1:33.

Third quarter

- STL – Torry Holt 15-yard pass from Marc Bulger (Jeff Wilkins kick), 12:14. Cardinals 17–10. Drive: 6 plays, 62 yards, 2:46.
- ARI – Marcel Shipp 6-yard run (Neil Rackers kick), 2:10. Cardinals 24–10. Drive: 10 plays, 88 yards, 4:03.

Fourth quarter

- STL – Jeff Wilkins 37-yard field goal, 14:30. Cardinals 24–13. Drive: 7 plays, 55 yards, 2:40.
- ARI – Marcel Shipp 9-yard run (Neil Rackers kick), 8:14. Cardinals 31–13. Drive: 4 plays, 19 yards, 2:13.
- ARI – Neil Rackers 20-yard field goal, 1:57. Cardinals 34–13. Drive: 9 plays, 34 yards, 4:38.
- STL – Isaac Bruce 1-yard pass from Marc Bulger (Jeff Wilkins kick), 0:35. Cardinals 34–20. Drive: 10 plays, 62 yards, 1:22.

Top passers

- ARI – Matt Leinart – 15/24, 186 yards, TD
- STL – Marc Bulger – 27/45, 314 yards, 2 TD, 3 INT

Top rushers

- ARI – Edgerrin James – 26 rushes, 115 yards
- STL – Steven Jackson – 21 rushes, 96 yards

Top receivers

- ARI – Larry Fitzgerald – 5 receptions, 46 yards, TD
- STL – Torry Holt – 7 receptions, 115 yards, TD

The Cards visited the Edward Jones Dome in St. Louis (the team's former home) to take on the Rams. The Cardinals won by a score of 34–20. Quarterback Matt Leinart was 15-for-24 for 186 yards and one touchdown; running back Edgerrin James had his 50th career 100-yard rushing game, and running back Marcel Shipp scored three touchdowns. The Cardinals moved up to 3–9 and they finally managed to acquire their very first road win of the season.

=== Week 14: vs. Seattle Seahawks ===
Week 14: Seattle Seahawks at Arizona Cardinals – Game summary

Quarter	1	2	3	4	Total
Seahawks	7	7	7	0	21
Cardinals	14	3	0	10	27

at University of Phoenix Stadium, Glendale, Arizona

- Date: December 10
- Game time: 2:05 p.m. MST
- Game weather: None (retractable roof closed)
- Game attendance: 63,603
- Referee: Gene Steratore
- Box Score

Game information

First quarter

- ARI – Bryant Johnson 56-yard pass from Matt Leinart (Neil Rackers kick), 12:45. Cardinals 7–0. Drive: 1 play, 56 yards, 0:09.
- ARI – Edgerrin James 7-yard run (Neil Rackers kick), 3:27. Cardinals 14–0. Drive: 4 plays, 24 yards, 1:58.
- SEA – D.J. Hackett 23-yard pass from Matt Hasselbeck (Josh Brown kick), 2:37. Cardinals 14–7. Drive: 2 plays, 70 yards, 0:50.

Second quarter

- ARI – Neil Rackers 32-yard field goal, 3:14. Cardinals 17–7. Drive: 11 plays, 60 yards, 6:41.
- SEA – Nate Burleson 5-yard pass from Matt Hasselbeck (Josh Brown kick), 0:30. Cardinals 17–14. Drive: 8 plays, 91 yards, 2:44.

Third quarter

- SEA – Darrell Jackson 2-yard pass from Matt Hasselbeck (Josh Brown kick), 5:05. Seahawks 21–17. Drive: 11 plays, 57 yards, 5:24.

Fourth quarter

- ARI – Larry Fitzgerald 5-yard pass from Matt Leinart (Neil Rackers kick), 14:56. Cardinals 24–21. Drive: 7 plays, 36 yards, 3:28.
- ARI – Neil Rackers 40-yard field goal, 3:30. Cardinals 27–21. Drive: 6 plays, 18 yards, 3:33.

Top passers

- SEA – Matt Hasselbeck – 20/28, 243 yards, 3 TD
- ARI – Matt Leinart – 21/34, 232 yards, 2 TD, INT

Top rushers

- SEA – Shaun Alexander – 22 rushes, 76 yards
- ARI – Edgerrin James – 26 rushes, 115 yards, TD

Top receivers

- SEA – D.J. Hackett – 4 receptions, 104 yards, TD
- ARI – Bryant Johnson – 3 receptions, 81 yards, TD

Coming of their road win over the Rams, the Cardinals went home for an NFC West rematch with the Seattle Seahawks. In the first quarter, the Cardinals drew first blood with quarterback Matt Leinart completing a 56-yard touchdown pass to wide receiver Bryant Johnson, while running back Edgerrin James (who ran for 115 yards on the day) got a 7-yard touchdown run. The Seahawks responded with quarterback Matt Hasselbeck's 23-yard touchdown pass to wide receiver D.J. Hackett. In the second quarter, the Cardinals increased their lead with kicker Neil Rackers getting a 32-yard field goal, yet Seattle responded with Hasselbeck's 5-yard touchdown pass to wide receiver Nate Burleson. In the third quarter, Arizona temporarily lost the lead as Hasselbeck completed a 2-yard touchdown pass to wide receiver Darrell Jackson for the only score of the period. In the fourth quarter, Arizona reclaimed the lead and won with Leinart's 5-yard touchdown pass to wide receiver Larry Fitzgerald and Rackers' 40-yard field goal. With the upset win, the Cardinals improved to 4–9.

=== Week 15: vs. Denver Broncos ===
Week 15: Denver Broncos at Arizona Cardinals – Game summary

Quarter	1	2	3	4	Total
Broncos	10	6	7	14	37
Cardinals	0	10	3	7	20

at University of Phoenix Stadium, Glendale, Arizona

- Date: December 17
- Game time: 2:05 p.m. MST
- Game weather: (retractable roof open)
- Game attendance: 63,845
- Referee: Walt Anderson
- TV announcers (CBS): Jim Nantz, Phil Simms
- Box Score

Game information

First quarter

- DEN – Javon Walker 54-yard pass from Jay Cutler (Jason Elam kick), 12:00. Broncos 7–0. Drive: 3 plays, 65 yards, 1:26.
- DEN – Jason Elam 30-yard field goal, 8:51. Broncos 10–0. Drive: 6 plays, 14 yards, 2:57.

Second quarter

- DEN – Jason Elam 22-yard field goal, 12:59. Broncos 13–0. Drive: 17 plays, 78 yards, 9:02.
- ARI – Neil Rackers 49-yard field goal, 8:12. Broncos 13–3. Drive: 10 plays, 46 yards, 4:47.
- ARI – Antonio Smith 4-yard fumble return (Neil Rackers kick), 7:53. Broncos 13–10.
- DEN – Jason Elam 30-yard field goal, 0:57. Broncos 16–10. Drive: 13 plays, 66 yards, 6:56.

Third quarter

- DEN – Rod Smith 10-yard pass from Jay Cutler (Jason Elam kick), 8:54. Broncos 24–10. Drive: 6 plays, 60 yards, 3:00.
- ARI – Neil Rackers 38-yard field goal, 2:19. Broncos 24–13. Drive: 11 plays, 65 yards, 6:35.

Fourth quarter

- DEN – Mike Bell 1-yard run (Jason Elam kick), 13:51. Broncos 31–13. Drive: 6 plays, 29 yards, 3:28.
- ARI – Edgerrin James 4-yard run (Neil Rackers kick), 7:46. Broncos 31–20. Drive: 13 plays, 80 yards, 6:05.
- DEN – Mike Bell 1-yard run (Jason Elam kick), 2:44. Broncos 38–20. Drive: 11 plays, 62 yards, 5:02.

Top passers

- DEN – Jay Cutler – 21/31, 261 yards, 2 TD, INT
- ARI – Matt Leinart – 20/35, 214 yards, 2 INT

Top rushers

- DEN – Mike Bell – 16 rushes, 61 yards, 2 TD
- ARI – Edgerrin James – 14 rushes, 63 yards, TD

Top receivers

- DEN – Javon Walker – 5 receptions, 84 yards, TD
- ARI – Larry Fitzgerald – 5 receptions, 77 yards

Trying to snap a four-game losing skid, the Broncos flew to the University of Phoenix Stadium for a Week 15 interconference fight with the Arizona Cardinals. The last time these two teams met each other, Denver won 37–7 at Invesco Field at Mile High on December 29, 2002. This time, it was a battle of rookie quarterbacks as Matt Leinart went up against Jay Cutler. Former Cardinals quarterback Jake Plummer had been reduced to a backup, and he never saw action against his former team.

In the first quarter, the Cardinals trailed early as Cutler completed a 54-yard touchdown pass to wide receiver Javon Walker and kicker Jason Elam nailed a 30-yard field goal. In the second quarter, Arizona trailed even further with Elam's 22-yard field goal. The Cardinals scored as kicker Neil Rackers nailed a 49-yard field goal and defensive end Antonio Smith returned a fumble 4 yards for a touchdown. However, Denver managed to get one last field goal before halftime as Elam kicked a 30-yard field goal. In the third quarter, more struggles continued as Cutler completed a 10-yard touchdown pass to wide receiver Rod Smith. Arizona responded with Rackers' 38-yard field goal. In the fourth quarter, the Broncos continued their pounding on the Cardinals with running back Mike Bell's 1-yard touchdown run. Even though the Cardinals got a 4-yard touchdown run by running back Edgerrin James, Denver wrapped up Cutler's first NFL win with another 1-yard touchdown run by Mike Bell. With the loss, Arizona fell to 4–10.

=== Week 16: at San Francisco 49ers ===
Week 16: Arizona Cardinals at San Francisco 49ers – Game summary

Quarter	1	2	3	4	Total
Cardinals	10	10	0	6	26
49ers	3	3	7	7	20

at Monster Park, San Francisco, California

- Date: December 24
- Game time: 1:05 p.m. PST/2:05 p.m. MST
- Game weather: 50 °F (10 °C)
- Game attendance: 67,751
- Referee: Bill Vinovich
- Box Score

Game information

First quarter

- SF – Joe Nedney 49-yard field goal, 10:19. 49ers 3–0. Drive: 7 plays, 37 yards, 4:41.
- ARI – Neil Rackers 25-yard field goal, 7:41. Tied 3–3. Drive: 5 plays, 65 yards, 2:38.
- ARI – Marcel Shipp 5-yard run (Neil Rackers kick), 0:59. Cardinals 10–3. Drive: 8 plays, 64 yards, 3:26.

Second quarter

- ARI – Larry Fitzgerald 6-yard pass from Matt Leinart (Neil Rackers kick), 8:07. Cardinals 17–3. Drive: 10 plays, 74 yards, 5:12.
- ARI – Neil Rackers 39-yard field goal, 1:57. Cardinals 20–3. Drive: 9 plays, 33 yards, 4:30.
- SF – Joe Nedney 32-yard field goal, 0:22. Cardinals 20–6. Drive: 8 plays, 56 yards, 1:35.

Third quarter

- SF – Frank Gore 2-yard run (Joe Nedney kick), 6:25. Cardinals 20–13. Drive: 6 plays, 46 yards, 3:20.

Fourth quarter

- ARI – Neil Rackers 37-yard field goal, 14:57. Cardinals 23–13. Drive: 12 plays, 58 yards, 6:28.
- ARI – Neil Rackers 32-yard field goal, 8:28. Cardinals 26–13. Drive: 4 plays, 4 yards, 1:41.
- SF – Frank Gore 1-yard run (Joe Nedney kick), 5:00. Cardinals 26–20. Drive: 8 plays, 58 yards, 3:28.

Top passers

- ARI – Matt Leinart – 9/13, 162 yards, TD
- SF – Alex Smith – 18/29, 190 yards, INT

Top rushers

- ARI – Edgerrin James – 29 rushes, 105 yards
- SF – Frank Gore – 11 rushes, 51 yards, 2 TD

Top receivers

- ARI – Larry Fitzgerald – 4 receptions, 93 yards, TD
- SF – Vernon Davis – 4 receptions, 91 yards

Hoping to rebound from their home loss to the Broncos, the Cardinals flew to Monster Park for an NFC West rematch with the San Francisco 49ers. In the first quarter, the 49ers struck first with kicker Joe Nedney nailing a 49-yard field goal. Afterwards, the Cardinals took the lead with kicker Neil Rackers getting a 25-yard field goal and running back Marcel Shipp getting a 5-yard touchdown run. In the second quarter, Arizona increased its lead with rookie quarterback Matt Leinart completing a 6-yard touchdown pass to wide receiver Larry Fitzgerald, while Rackers kicked a 39-yard field goal. Afterwards, San Francisco responded with Nedney kicking a 32-yard field goal. In the third quarter, the 49ers started to retaliate with running back Frank Gore getting a 2-yard touchdown run for the only score of the period. In the fourth quarter, the Cardinals increased its lead with Rackers kicking a 37-yard and a 32-yard field goal. Even though the 49ers got another score as Gore managed to get a 1-yard touchdown run, Arizona held on to sweep San Francisco. With the win, the Cardinals improved to 5–10.

=== Week 17: at San Diego Chargers ===
Week 17: Arizona Cardinals at San Diego Chargers – Game summary

Quarter	1	2	3	4	Total
Cardinals	7	0	3	10	20
Chargers	3	14	10	0	27

at Qualcomm Stadium, San Diego, California

- Date: December 31
- Game time: 1:15 p.m. PST/2:15 p.m. MST
- Game weather: 57 °F (14 °C)
- Game attendance: 66,492
- Referee: Gerry Austin
- TV announcers (FOX): Matt Devlin, Dale Hellestrae, Chris Rix
- Box Score

Game information

First quarter

- ARI – Edgerrin James 8-yard run (Neil Rackers kick), 6:21. Cardinals 7–0. Drive: 9 plays, 78 yards, 3:59.
- SD – Nate Kaeding 47-yard field goal, 2:23. Cardinals 7–3. Drive: 8 plays, 36 yards, 3:58.

Second quarter

- SD – Antonio Gates 33-yard pass from Philip Rivers (Nate Kaeding kick), 10:25. Chargers 10–7. Drive: 10 plays, 76 yards, 4:58.
- SD – Vincent Jackson 14-yard pass from Philip Rivers (Nate Kaeding kick), 1:49. Chargers 17–7. Drive: 10 plays, 79 yards, 5:09.

Third quarter

- SD – Tim Dobbins 0-yard fumble return (Nate Kaeding kick), 12:25. Chargers 24–7.
- SD – Nate Kaeding 35-yard field goal, 6:23. Chargers 27–7. Drive: 8 plays, 45 yards, 4:25.
- ARI – Neil Rackers 28-yard field goal, 1:31. Chargers 27–10. Drive: 9 plays, 73 yards, 4:52.

Fourth quarter

- ARI – Larry Fitzgerald 9-yard pass from Kurt Warner (Neil Rackers kick), 9:06. Chargers 27–17. Drive: 7 plays, 86 yards, 3:41.
- ARI – Neil Rackers 20-yard field goal, 3:23. Chargers 27–20. Drive: 9 plays, 84 yards, 4:02.

Top passers

- ARI – Kurt Warner – 22/32, 356 yards, TD
- SD – Philip Rivers – 19/24, 231 yards, 2 TD, INT

Top rushers

- ARI – Edgerrin James – 16 rushes, 66 yards, TD
- SD – LaDainian Tomlinson – 16 rushes, 66 yards

Top receivers

- ARI – Anquan Boldin – 4 receptions, 112 yards
- SD – Eric Parker – 5 receptions, 62 yards

Trying to end their lackluster season on a high note, the Cardinals played their last game of the year at Qualcomm Stadium against the playoff-bound San Diego Chargers. In the first quarter, Arizona struck first with running back Edgerrin James getting an 8-yard touchdown run, yet the Chargers managed to get a 47-yard field goal from kicker Nate Kaeding. In the second quarter, the Cardinals' year-long ineffectiveness continued to show as quarterback Philip Rivers completed a 33-yard touchdown pass to tight end Antonio Gates and a 14-yard touchdown pass to wide receiver Vincent Jackson. In the third quarter, San Diego wrapped up the game with linebacker Tim Dobbins recovering a fumble the Cardinals' endzone for a touchdown, while Kaeding kicked a 35-yard field goal. Afterwards, Arizona tried to make a comeback and it started with kicker Neil Rackers getting a 28-yard field goal. In the fourth quarter, the Cardinals continued with their attempt at a comeback as quarterback Kurt Warner completed a 9-yard touchdown pass to wide receiver Larry Fitzgerald and a 20-yard field goal by Rackers. However, their comeback fell short. With the loss, the Cardinals ended their season at 5–11, and with head coach Dennis Green's dismissal.
