= Dennis Green =

American gridiron football player, coach (1949–2016)

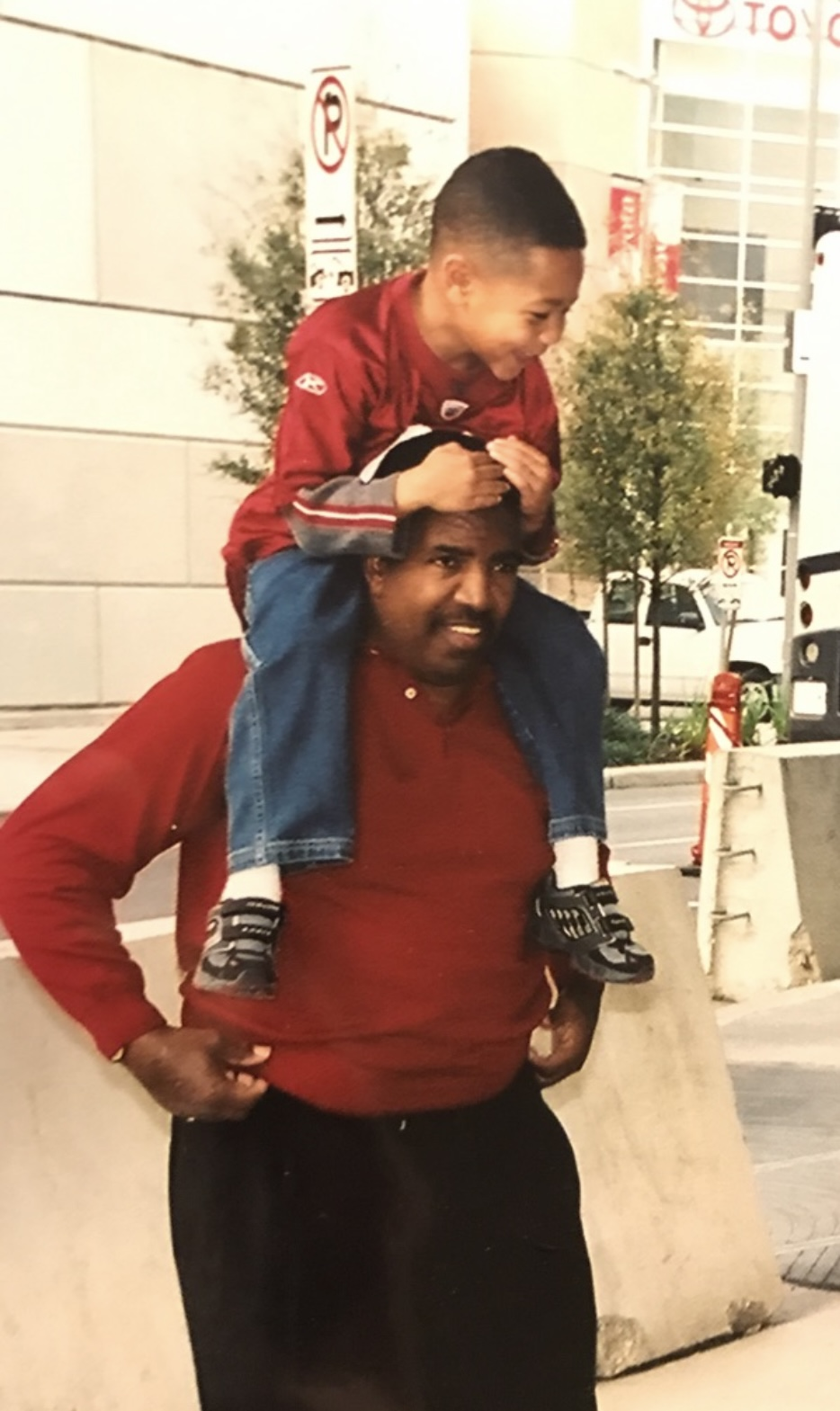
- Green and his youngest son Zachary at Super Bowl XXXVIII

Profile
- Position: Running back

Personal information
- Born: February 17, 1949; Harrisburg, Pennsylvania, U.S.
- Died: July 22, 2016 (aged 67); San Diego, California, U.S.

Career information
- High school: John Harris (Harrisburg, Pennsylvania)
- College: Iowa (1967–1970)
- NFL draft: 1971: undrafted

Career history

Playing
- BC Lions (1971)

Coaching
- Iowa (1972) Graduate assistant; Dayton (1973) Running backs coach & wide receivers coach; Iowa (1974–1976) Running backs coach; Stanford (1977–1978) Running backs coach; San Francisco 49ers (1979) Special teams coach; Stanford (1980) Offensive coordinator; Northwestern (1981–1985) Head coach; San Francisco 49ers (1986–1988) Wide receivers coach; Stanford (1989–1991) Head coach; Minnesota Vikings (1992–2001) Head coach; Arizona Cardinals (2004–2006) Head coach; California Redwoods / Sacramento Mountain Lions (2009–2011) Head coach

Awards and highlights
- Super Bowl champion (XXIII); Greasy Neale Award (1998); UPI NFC Coach of the Year (1992); Big Ten Coach of the Year (1982); Minnesota Vikings Ring of Honor; Minnesota Vikings All-Mall of America Field Team

Career NFL statistics
- Win–loss record: 113–94
- Postseason record: 4–8
- NCAA record: 26–63
- Coaching profile at Pro Football Reference

Dennis Earl Green (February 17, 1949 – July 22, 2016) was an American professional football coach. During his National Football League (NFL) career, Green coached the Minnesota Vikings from 1992 to 2001 and the Arizona Cardinals from 2004 to 2006. He coached the Vikings to eight playoff appearances in nine years, despite having seven different starting quarterbacks in those postseasons. He was posthumously inducted into the Minnesota Vikings Ring of Honor in 2018.

Green was the second African American head coach in modern NFL history, after Art Shell. He was the Minnesota Vikings head coach from 1992 to 2001. He was one of the winningest coaches of the 1990s, posting a 97–62 record as Vikings head coach. Green's best season in Minnesota was in 1998, when the Vikings finished 15–1 and set the NFL record for most points in a season at the time; however, the Vikings were upset by the Atlanta Falcons in that year's NFC Championship Game, and Green was unable to reach the Super Bowl throughout his otherwise successful tenure with Minnesota. Following his first losing record in 2001, he was fired just before the final game of the season.

Green was hired by the Cardinals to serve as the head coach for the 2004 season, a franchise then noted for its futility, which had posted only one winning season in a quarter-century. In Arizona, Green was unable to match his success in Minnesota, and his poor win–loss record (16–32) with the Cardinals was similar to that of his predecessors in Arizona. However, many describe Green's tenure with Arizona as an inflection point in the history of the Cardinals, arguing that the culture of the team changed under Green, and that the core of the personnel in the Cardinals' 2008 Super Bowl run was acquired by Green.

== Early and personal life ==
Green grew up in a working class household in Harrisburg, Pennsylvania at the corner of Walnut and N 12th Street. In 2019, the 1100 to 1300 block of Walnut Street was renamed "Dennis Green Way" to honor the late native. Green's father, Penrose "Bus" Green, was the grandson of a Cuban slave who fled to Baltimore, Maryland and married a woman from the Seneca tribe. After serving in World War II, Bus Green briefly played semi-professional football for the Harrisburg Lions and supported his family by working for the U.S. Postal Service. Green’s mother, Anna Green, was a beautician born in Greensboro, North Carolina, and raised in Harrisburg. In his Autobiography, No Room for Crybabies Green recalls a traumatic beginning to his teenage years. His father died from a ruptured appendix at the age of 39 when Green was just 11. Two years later, his mother died from undiagnosed breast cancer. The youngest of five brothers, Green was then raised by his older siblings: Penrose Green II, Robert, Stanley, and Gregory.

Green attended John Harris High School (now Harrisburg High School) in Harrisburg, and graduated cum laude from the University of Iowa with a BS in Recreational Studies. According to Green, he was planning to be a high school teacher if his football career did not pan out. In college, he started as halfback in each of his three seasons with the Iowa Hawkeyes, playing under coach Ray Nagel. In his collegiate career, Green had 139 carries for 699 yards and nine touchdowns. His best individual game was in a 1968 loss to Texas Christian University, when he rushed 18 times for 175 yards and two touchdowns.

Green has four children from two marriages: Patti Green (born April, 1967), Jeremy Green (born July, 1971), Vanessa Green (born February, 1997), and Zachary Dennis Green (born November, 1998).

== Boycott of 1969 ==
Green received a full ride athletic scholarship to attend the University of Iowa in the fall of 1967. During this time, many black athletes spoke out about racial issues in Iowa City that affected their social life outside of athletics, and, most importantly, in the classroom. In 1968, eighteen black student-athletes from the university's football and basketball teams were interviewed for an article in a local newspaper, The Daily Iowan. Green, pictured on the second page of the article, stated, "The middle class whites believe in this black stereotype, and they believe all blacks fit into that black stereotype." Football player Louis Age, who was born and raised in New Orleans, said, "It is better in the south than it is here. You look at the white man down there and you know he doesn't like you; up here you don't know what to think. This place definitely has a phony atmosphere." After the 1954 Brown v. Board of Education ruling that racial segregation in education was unconstitutional, many of these issues arose for black students as they began to attend universities around the country.

In 1969, led by running back Green, sixteen black players of Iowa's Football team boycotted spring practice. The players were protesting a decision by coach Ray Nagel to suspend two black players — both starters from the previous season — for undisclosed reasons. The sixteen players were subsequently dismissed from the team. That did not stop them from continuing to advocate for changes within the athletic department to better support black athletes. Green was quoted by Sports Illustrated as saying in 1992, "the school wasn't ready for us, but it was also the times. Black guys wanted to prove their manhood, their boldness, to stand up and be counted."

Coleman Lane, one of the dismissed athletes, said, "The main crux of our demands is academic, and white and black will both benefit from it, only the black will benefit more." The demands listed by the football players and the Black Athletes Union were an attempt to improve the plight of black student athletes not only at the University of Iowa, but also at universities throughout the United States.

=== Aftermath ===
Because of their stance, most of the items the black players demanded were implemented at Iowa, and throughout the Big Ten, within a few years, and a couple of them within a few months.

As the '69 season grew near, the players, including Green, asked to be reinstated. Nagel had the majority white squad vote on the players individually at a team meeting. Seven were reinstated, including Green, but five were rejected.

The boycott cost some of the players their football careers. While some of the black players were allowed back on the team, a handful saw their college careers end prematurely because of their participation in the boycott against the university's unjust academic and athletic prejudices.

Because of his leadership in the boycott, NFL teams with Green on their draft radar decided to pass on him in the 1971 NFL draft, thus cutting his playing career short. Specifically, the Dallas Cowboys had planned to draft Green, but instead picked running back Sam Scarber, who was subsequently waived before the season started.

After graduating from Iowa, Green briefly played professionally for the BC Lions of the Canadian Football League in 1971 before beginning his successful coaching career. At the time of his death in 2016, he was the third most successful black head coach in NFL history, behind his protégé Tony Dungy and Mike Tomlin.

== Assistant coaching career ==
Green began his football coaching career, returning to the University of Iowa in 1972 as a graduate assistant. He then served as an assistant coach at the University of Dayton (1973), University of Iowa (1974 to 1976) and Stanford University, where he coached under Bill Walsh in 1977 and 1978. In 1979, Green joined Walsh's staff on the San Francisco 49ers, where he coached special teams. Green returned to Stanford in 1980 as offensive coordinator, coaching with Jim Fassel and Jack Harbaugh.

== College coaching career ==
In 1981, Green was named the head coach of Northwestern University, a school that had gone 1–31–1 in its last 33 games. In 1981, he was only the second African American head coach in Division I-A history (the previous coach, Willie Jeffries, coached at Wichita State, which no longer has a football team). Green was named the Big Ten Conference Coach of the Year, as chosen by writers and broadcasters, in 1982 at Northwestern. He left Northwestern in 1985, doing a stint as the wide receivers coach for the San Francisco 49ers under his former boss at Stanford, Bill Walsh. In his last season with the San Francisco 49ers, they reached the 1989 NFL Super Bowl Championship Game, in which Green made the play call that led to John Taylor's 10-yard TD reception from Joe Montana that secured the win with 39 seconds left.

In 1989, Green took the head coaching position at Stanford University, inheriting a team that had graduated 17 of its 21 starters from 1988. Green led the Cardinal from 1989 to 1991. During that time, his teams finished with an overall record of 16–18, a .471 winning percentage, going 3–0 in the Big Game against the California Golden Bears. In 1990, his Stanford team defeated top-ranked Notre Dame in South Bend, Indiana. His tenure culminated with an 8–3 record (Stanford's best since 1986). A loss to Washington in the opening game of the season was the deciding factor for the Pac-10 championship. The Cardinal made an appearance in the 1991 Aloha Bowl, where his team lost to Georgia Tech on a last-minute touchdown.

== Professional coaching career ==
=== Minnesota Vikings ===
Green was a disciple of Bill Walsh's West Coast offense, and was touted by Walsh and other NFL pundits as a likely candidate to be the second African-American head coach in the NFL. On January 10, 1992, Green was named 5th head coach of the Minnesota Vikings, replacing the retiring Jerry Burns. The day he was introduced as the Vikings' head coach, he announced that there was a "new sheriff in town". He was the second African American head coach, after Art Shell, in the modern NFL era, and the first to do so without ever playing in the NFL. Green was the third in NFL history, after Fritz Pollard in the 1920s, and Shell.

Through his first six years with the team, Green never posted a losing record, and the team failed to qualify for the playoffs only once. He was reportedly the pioneer of using the team's day off on Tuesday to do charity work in the community, which eventually became common in the NFL. Initially, Green earned widespread praise for turning around what had recently been a lackluster franchise. However, as the team's fan-base grew accustomed to regular season success, he came under criticism for failing to advance the team deeper into the playoffs.

In 1996, two members of the Vikings' ownership board, Wheelock Whitney and Jane Dyer, reportedly contacted Lou Holtz, who was the coach of the Notre Dame Fighting Irish football team and former coach of the Minnesota Golden Gophers football team. They wanted to bring Holtz in to replace Green. Holtz abruptly announced his retirement in 1996, and rumors surrounded the reasons, one of which was the possible Vikings head coaching position.

In 1997, Green published his autobiography No Room For Crybabies, in which he responded to the criticism and perceived personal vendettas by Twin Cities sports writers Bob Sansevere, Dan Barreiro, and Patrick Reusse. He threatened to sue the team as his response to the Lou Holtz rumors.

The high point of Green's Vikings career was the 1998 season, when the team went 15–1 and set the NFL record for the most points scored in a season. (The 2013 Denver Broncos under John Fox currently hold this record.) The Vikings advanced to the NFC Championship game, losing to the Atlanta Falcons after Atlanta's Morten Andersen made a field goal in overtime.

In 2001, the Vikings finished with a losing record for the first time in Green's decade with the team and there were reported disagreements between Green and team owner Red McCombs; Green was reported to have almost resigned midseason because of McCombs insisting that he fire assistant coach and director of pro personnel Richard Solomon. The Vikings bought out Green's contract on January 4, 2002. Assistant coach Mike Tice led the team in their final regular season game against the Baltimore Ravens, and was eventually hired as the head coach.

=== Arizona Cardinals ===
After spending two seasons as an analyst for ESPN, Green was hired as head coach by the Arizona Cardinals on January 7, 2004. Through his first two years with the team, he totaled 11 wins with the Cardinals and finished third in the NFC West, an improvement over predecessor Dave McGinnis. Unlike his previous two seasons, the 2006 season began with great expectations for the Cardinals, with the opening of a new stadium, sellout crowds, the drafting of quarterback Matt Leinart, and the signing of Pro Bowl running back Edgerrin James. After a solid start, the Cardinals suffered some tough early losses.

==== "They are who we thought they were!" ====
"My doctor was very happy. He called me the next day, said: 'You know what? After that kind of game, (me) blowing up like that was a very good stress reliever', and my wife agreed."

— Dennis Green

One of the early losses came in a Monday Night Football game on October 16, 2006, losing a 20-point lead to the Chicago Bears in less than twenty minutes, without the Bears scoring any points on offense. Asked about how Chicago's tenacious defense forced six turnovers and shut down the Arizona offense, the normally soft-spoken Green unloaded from the lectern:

The Bears are what we thought they were. They're what we thought they were. We played 'em in preseason — who the hell takes the third game of the preseason like it's bullshit? Bullshit! We played 'em in the third game — everybody played three quarters — the Bears are who we thought they were! And that's the way we took the damn field! Now if you want to crown 'em, then crown their ass! But they are who we thought they were! And we let 'em off the hook!

The day after the press conference, offensive coordinator Keith Rowen was fired and replaced with quarterbacks coach Mike Kruczek. Although Green later apologized for the outburst, and the Cardinals rallied to win four of their last seven games, including a rare win over playoff-bound Seattle, many pundits felt that the loss to Chicago and ensuing tirade had already sealed Green's fate. On January 1, 2007, the Cardinals fired Green with a year left on his contract.

Green's tirade is still used heavily in NFL media coverage today, often comically, to describe the obvious flaws of an opponent and the failure to capitalize on that knowledge. It was featured in a Coors TV advertisement.

=== Later career ===
In August 2007, the Westwood One radio network announced that it had hired Green to serve as a color analyst on their Thursday night NFL broadcasts.

On March 11, 2009, it was announced that Green would be the head coach of the San Francisco franchise for the United Football League's inaugural season. Green's first game as California Redwoods coach was a 30–17 loss to the Las Vegas Locomotives.

Beginning with the 2010 season, the Redwoods moved to Sacramento and were renamed the Mountain Lions. Green remained as head coach for the 2011 seasons as well, his final season with the Mountain Lions. After leaving the team, Green sued the league for lack of payment on a $1.5 million contract for the 2011 season. (The United Football League suspended play in October 2012 amid lawsuits alleging unpaid debts.) An arbitrator awarded Green $990,000 for the 2011 season, and the award was upheld in February 2014 by a San Francisco Superior Court judge.

== Death ==
On Thursday, July 22, 2016, Green died at the age of 67 due to complications from cardiac arrest. He was survived by his wife Marie and his four children.

After his death, the Vikings team released a statement saying, "He mentored countless players and served as a father figure for the men he coached. He took great pride in helping assistant coaches advance their careers. His tenure as one of the first African American head coaches in both college and the NFL was also transformative. Our thoughts and prayers are with the entire Green family."

== Head coaching record ==
=== College ===
Year	Team	Overall	Conference	Standing	Bowl/playoffs	Coaches^{#}	AP^{°}
Northwestern Wildcats (Big Ten Conference) (1981–1985)
1981	Northwestern	0–11	0–9	10th			
1982	Northwestern	3–8	2–7	T–8th			
1983	Northwestern	2–9	2–7	T–8th			
1984	Northwestern	2–9	2–7	9th			
1985	Northwestern	3–8	1–7	T–9th			
Northwestern:		10–45	7–37				
Stanford Cardinal (Pacific-10 Conference) (1989–1991)
1989	Stanford	3–8	3–5	T–7th			
1990	Stanford	5–6	4–4	T–6th			
1991	Stanford	8–4	6–2	T–2nd	L Aloha	22	22
Stanford:		16–18	13–11				
Total:		26–63					
^{#}Rankings from final Coaches Poll.; ^{°}Rankings from final AP Poll.

=== NFL ===
Team	Year	Regular season					Postseason			
Team	Year	Won	Lost	Ties	Win %	Finish	Won	Lost	Win %	Result
MIN	1992	11	5	0	.688	1st in NFC Central	0	1	.000	Lost to Washington Redskins in NFC Wild Card Game
MIN	1993	9	7	0	.562	2nd in NFC Central	0	1	.000	Lost to New York Giants in NFC Wild Card Game
MIN	1994	10	6	0	.625	1st in NFC Central	0	1	.000	Lost to Chicago Bears in NFC Wild Card Game
MIN	1995	8	8	0	.500	4th in NFC Central	–	–	–	–
MIN	1996	9	7	0	.562	2nd in NFC Central	0	1	.000	Lost to Dallas Cowboys in NFC Wild Card Game
MIN	1997	9	7	0	.562	4th in NFC Central	1	1	.500	Lost to San Francisco 49ers in NFC Divisional Game
MIN	1998	15	1	0	.938	1st in NFC Central	1	1	.500	Lost to Atlanta Falcons in NFC Championship Game
MIN	1999	10	6	0	.625	2nd in NFC Central	1	1	.500	Lost to St. Louis Rams in NFC Divisional Game
MIN	2000	11	5	0	.688	1st in NFC Central	1	1	.500	Lost to New York Giants in NFC Championship Game
MIN	2001*	5	10	0	.333	4th in NFC Central	–	–	–	–
MIN Total		97	62	0	.610		4	8	.333	
ARI	2004	6	10	0	.375	3rd in NFC West	–	–	–	–
ARI	2005	5	11	0	.313	3rd in NFC West	–	–	–	–
ARI	2006	5	11	0	.313	4th in NFC West	–	–	–	–
ARI Total		16	32	0	.333		–	–	–	
Total		113	94	0	.546		4	8	.333	

*Only coached 15 games

=== United Football League ===
Team	Year	Regular season					Postseason			
Team	Year	Won	Lost	Ties	Win %	Finish	Won	Lost	Win %	Result
CAL	2009	2	4	0	.333	3rd in UFL	–	–	–	–
SAC	2010	4	4	0	.500	3rd in UFL	–	–	–	–
SAC	2011	2	3	0	.400	3rd in UFL	–	–	–	–
Total		8	11	0	.421		-	–	–	–

== See also ==
- List of NFL head coach wins leaders
