= Antonio Smith (defensive end) =

American football player (born 1981)

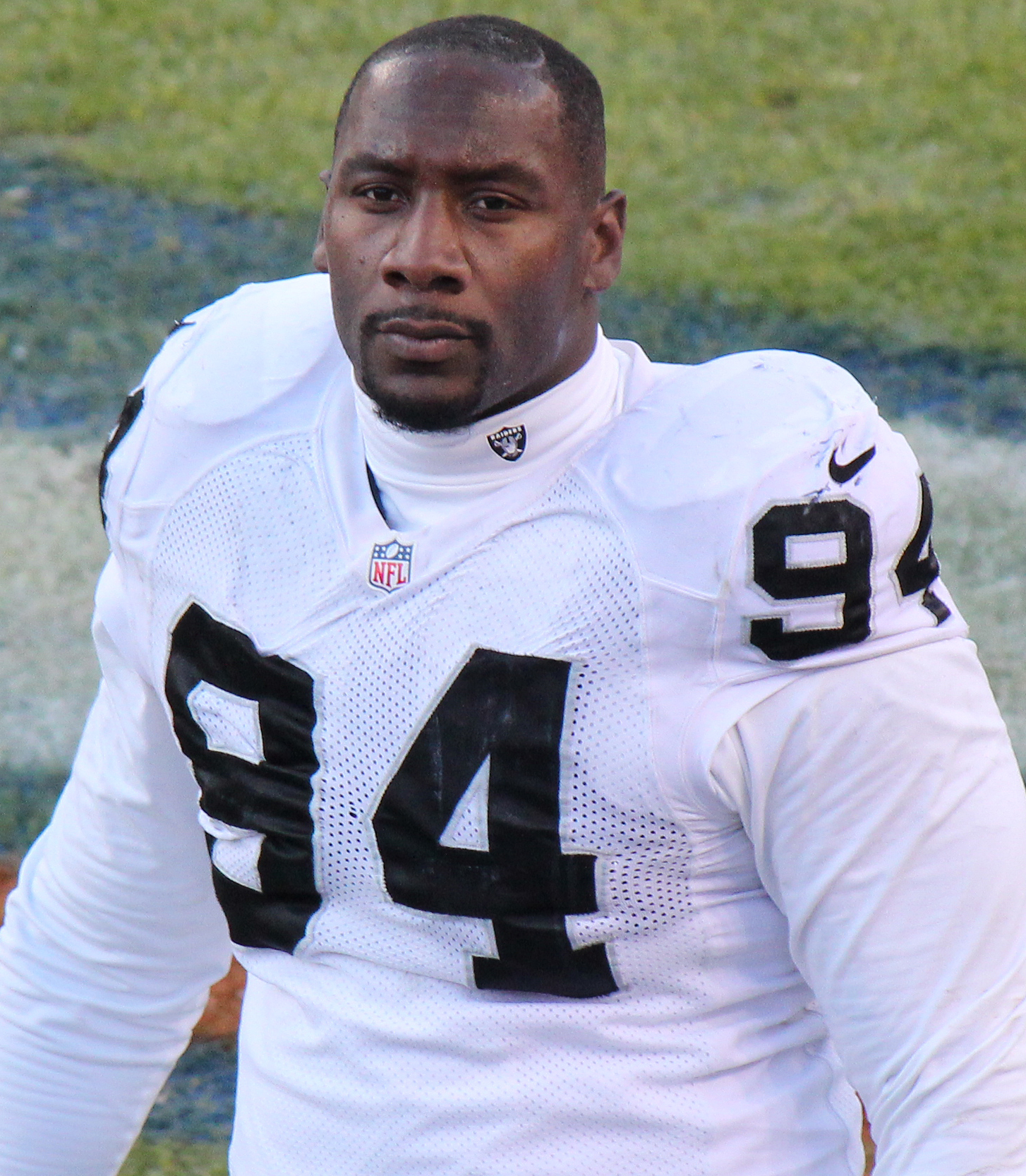
- Smith with the Oakland Raiders in 2014

No. 67, 94, 90
- Position: Defensive end

Personal information
- Born: October 21, 1981 (age 45); Oklahoma City, Oklahoma, U.S.
- Listed height: 6 ft 3 in (1.91 m)
- Listed weight: 290 lb (132 kg)

Career information
- High school: John Marshall (Oklahoma City)
- College: Oklahoma State
- NFL draft: 2004: 5th round, 135th overall pick

Career history
- Arizona Cardinals (2004–2008); Hamburg Sea Devils (2005); Houston Texans (2009–2013); Oakland Raiders (2014); Denver Broncos (2015); Houston Texans (2016)

Awards and highlights
- Super Bowl champion (50); Pro Bowl (2011)

Career NFL statistics
- Total tackles: 315
- Sacks: 47.5
- Forced fumbles: 11
- Fumble recoveries: 11
- Pass deflections: 10
- Defensive touchdowns: 1
- Stats at Pro Football Reference

Antonio DeShonta Smith (born October 21, 1981) is an American former professional football player who was a defensive end in the National Football League (NFL). He played college football for the Oklahoma State Cowboys, and was selected by the Arizona Cardinals in the fifth round of the 2004 NFL draft. He also played for the Denver Broncos, Oakland Raiders, and the Houston Texans in the NFL and for the Hamburg Sea Devils of NFL Europe. Smith won Super Bowl 50 as a member of the Broncos.

== College career ==
Smith played college football at Oklahoma State. He was an honorable mention All-Big 12 in his junior season at Oklahoma State. Antonio played for NEO A&M College in Miami, Oklahoma during his freshman (2000) and sophomore (2001) season. He transferred to Oklahoma State for his junior (2002) and senior (2003) seasons.

== Professional career ==
Pre-draft measurables
Height	Weight	Arm length	Hand span	40-yard dash	10-yard split	20-yard split	20-yard shuttle	Vertical jump	Broad jump	Bench press
6 ft 3 3/8 in (1.91 m)	274 lb (124 kg)	33 1/2 in (0.85 m)	10 1/8 in (0.26 m)	4.95 s	1.72 s	2.85 s	4.75 s	33.0 in (0.84 m)	9 ft 0 in (2.74 m)	24 reps
All values from NFL Combine/Pro Day

=== Arizona Cardinals ===
Smith was drafted in the fifth round with the 135th overall selection in the 2004 NFL draft. Following his rookie season, he played in the developmental NFL Europe as a member of the 2005 Hamburg Sea Devils.

During the 2008 NFL season, Smith played in every game and had 2 forced fumbles and 3.5 sacks. Smith helped the Cardinals reach Super Bowl XLIII, but the team would lose 27–23 to the Pittsburgh Steelers. Despite a great performance during the course of the season, the Cardinals chose not to re-sign him and let him go into free agency.

=== Houston Texans (first stint) ===
Smith was signed as an unrestricted free agent by the Houston Texans to replace the released Anthony Weaver.

In 2011, Smith went to his first career Pro Bowl, replacing the New England Patriots' Andre Carter who was unable to play due to injury.

In 2013, Smith was suspended for week one after an incident in the preseason in which he removed Miami Dolphins lineman Richie Incognito's helmet and swung it at him. On November 29, 2013, he was fined $15,750 for hitting Jacksonville Jaguars' quarterback Chad Henne in the head and neck region.

=== Oakland Raiders ===
On March 14, 2014, Smith signed a two-year, $9 million contract with the Oakland Raiders and played defensive tackle in the Raiders base 4-3 defense. He was released by the Raiders on March 31, 2015.

=== Denver Broncos ===
On April 2, 2015, Smith signed a one-year, $2 million contract with the Denver Broncos.

On February 7, 2016, Smith was part of the Broncos team that won Super Bowl 50. In the game, the Broncos defeated the Carolina Panthers by a score of 24–10.

=== Houston Texans (second stint) ===
After initially deciding to retire following the Super Bowl victory, Smith was contacted by his former team, the Houston Texans, and decided to return for one more season. On September 28, 2016, Smith was signed by the Texans, recording four tackles and one half sack in 13 games. After the season, which ended with a Houston loss in the Divisional Round to the eventual Super Bowl LI champion New England Patriots, he would retire for good.

=== NFL statistics ===
Year	Team	GP	COMB	TOTAL	AST	SACK	FF	FR	FR YDS	INT	IR YDS	AVG IR	LNG	TD	PD
2005	ARI	12	16	16	0	3.0	0	0	0	0	0	0	0	0	0
2006	ARI	16	25	14	11	2.5	0	2	0	0	0	0	0	0	0
2007	ARI	16	43	37	6	5.5	1	3	0	0	0	0	0	0	0
2008	ARI	16	41	31	10	3.5	2	3	0	0	0	0	0	0	0
2009	HOU	16	34	26	8	4.5	2	2	2	0	0	0	0	0	1
2010	HOU	16	38	23	15	4.0	1	0	0	0	0	0	0	0	2
2011	HOU	16	25	19	6	6.5	1	0	0	0	0	0	0	0	2
2012	HOU	16	30	22	8	7.0	2	1	0	0	0	0	0	0	3
2013	HOU	15	30	22	8	5.0	1	0	0	0	0	0	0	0	0
2014	OAK	16	20	18	2	3.0	0	0	0	0	0	0	0	0	1
2015	DEN	16	9	7	2	2.5	2	0	0	0	0	0	0	0	0
2016	HOU	13	4	3	1	0.5	0	0	0	0	0	0	0	0	0
Career		186	315	238	77	47.5	11	11	0	0	0	0	0	0	10

== Personal life ==
Smith has three children, Antonio Smith Jr. (2003), Winter Smith (2009) and Marty Smith (2014).

Smith, along with his sister Antwonette, founded Smith's Little People With Big Challenges Foundation. The organization's mission is to fight childhood obesity.

Smith's father died 4 days before Super Bowl 50, due to heart surgery complications. Antonio Smith shares his knowledge and talent by volunteering his time as a defensive line coach for the Christian Heritage high school football team (Del City, OK). The team played in 2018 Oklahoma state class A champion state final.

Following his retirement, Smith returned to his native Oklahoma and became a rancher, raising rabbits, horses, and cattle.
