= David Macklin =

American football player (born 1978)

No. 27, 38, 34
- Position: Cornerback

Personal information
- Born: July 14, 1978 (age 48); Newport News, Virginia, U.S.
- Listed height: 5 ft 9 in (1.75 m)
- Listed weight: 193 lb (88 kg)

Career information
- High school: Menchville (Newport News)
- College: Penn State
- NFL draft: 2000: 3rd round, 91st overall pick

Career history
- Indianapolis Colts (2000–2003); Arizona Cardinals (2004–2006); Washington Redskins (2007); St. Louis Rams (2008)*; Kansas City Chiefs (2008)
- * Offseason or practice squad member only

Awards and highlights
- First-team All-Big Ten (1998); Second-team All-Big Ten (1999)

Career NFL statistics
- Total tackles: 371
- Sacks: 1
- Forced fumbles: 3
- Fumble recoveries: 2
- Interceptions: 14
- Defensive touchdowns: 1
- Stats at Pro Football Reference

David Thurman Macklin (born July 14, 1978) is an American former professional football player who was a cornerback in the National Football League (NFL). He was selected by the Indianapolis Colts in the third round of the 2000 NFL draft. He played college football for the Penn State Nittany Lions.

Macklin was also a member of the Arizona Cardinals, Washington Redskins, St. Louis Rams and Kansas City Chiefs.

== College career ==
Macklin was a three-year starter at Penn State University. He was selected an All-Big Ten player as a junior in 1998, the year when he led the conference in interceptions with six. As a freshman Macklin briefly played point guard for the Penn State basketball team after the football season had ended.

Macklin studied business logistics at Penn State.

== Professional career ==
=== Indianapolis Colts ===
Macklin spent the first four years of his career with the Indianapolis Colts after being selected in the third round of the 2000 NFL draft with the 91st overall pick. He reached the 2004 AFC Championship Game with Colts, but the team lost to eventual Super Bowl champion New England Patriots in that game.

=== Arizona Cardinals ===
Macklin signed as a free-agent contract with the Arizona Cardinals in 2004. He scored his only NFL touchdown on a 60-yard interception return for the Cardinals in 2005. He was released by the Cardinals in March, 2007, making him a free agent again.

=== Washington Redskins ===
On April 5, 2007, he agreed to a deal with the Washington Redskins. He became a free agent at the conclusion of the season.

=== St. Louis Rams ===
Macklin signed with the St. Louis Rams in March 2008. He spent training camp with the team, but was released during the final cuts on August 30.

=== Kansas City Chiefs ===
Macklin signed with the Kansas City Chiefs to a two-year contract on November 5, 2008.

He was released on March 18, 2009.

=== NFL statistics ===
Year	Team	Games	Combined tackles	Tackles	Assisted tackles	Sacks	Forced fumbles	Fumble recoveries	Fumble return yards	Interceptions	Interception return yards	Yards per interception return	Longest interception return	Interceptions returned for touchdown	Passes defended
2000	IND	16	27	23	4	0.0	0	0	0	2	35	18	35	0	8
2001	IND	16	62	53	9	0.5	0	0	0	3	15	5	11	0	11
2002	IND	16	62	53	9	0.0	1	0	0	1	30	30	30	0	10
2003	IND	16	36	28	8	0.0	1	1	0	1	0	0	0	0	7
2004	ARI	16	74	62	12	0.5	1	1	0	4	18	5	16	0	16
2005	ARI	16	61	53	8	0.0	0	0	0	2	79	40	60	1	17
2006	ARI	14	34	33	1	0.0	0	0	0	1	56	56	56	0	5
2007	WSH	6	6	6	0	0.0	0	0	0	0	0	0	0	0	0
Career		116	362	311	51	1.0	3	2	0	14	233	17	60	1	74

== Personal life ==
Macklin was arrested for DUI in Newport News, Virginia on March 13, 2009; a BAC test indicated that his level was above the legal limit.

Macklin runs a foundation named 27 Reasons (27 is his college and professional number) which aids underprivileged kids in Arizona and Virginia.
