= Aaron Francisco =

American football player (born 1983)

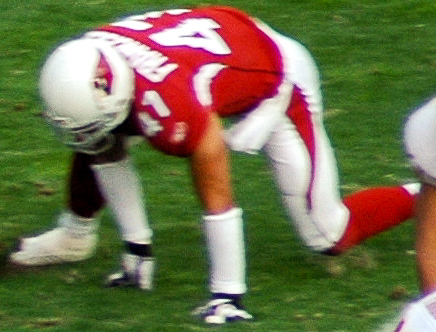
- Francisco with the Arizona Cardinals in 2005

No. 47, 43
- Position: Safety

Personal information
- Born: July 5, 1983 (age 43); Lā'ie, Hawai'i, U.S.
- Listed height: 6 ft 2 in (1.88 m)
- Listed weight: 207 lb (94 kg)

Career information
- High school: Kahuku (Kahuku, Hawaii)
- College: BYU
- NFL draft: 2005: undrafted

Career history
- Arizona Cardinals (2005)*; New York Jets (2005)*; Arizona Cardinals (2005–2008); Indianapolis Colts (2009); Carolina Panthers (2010)*; Indianapolis Colts (2010); Detroit Lions (2011)*; Tennessee Titans (2012)*
- * Offseason or practice squad member only

Awards and highlights
- 2× First-team All-MW (2003, 2004)

Career NFL statistics
- Total tackles: 218
- Forced fumbles: 1
- Pass deflections: 7
- Interceptions: 4
- Stats at Pro Football Reference

Aaron James Monroe Francisco (born July 5, 1983) is an American former professional football player who was a safety in the National Football League (NFL). He played college football for the BYU Cougars and was signed by the Arizona Cardinals as an undrafted free agent in 2005.

He was also a member of the New York Jets, Indianapolis Colts, Carolina Panthers, Detroit Lions, and Tennessee Titans.

== Early life ==
Aaron James Monroe Francisco was born on July 5, 1983, in Lā'ie, Hawai'i. He attended Kahuku High School in Kahuku, Hawai'i (Oahu), and was an All State and All Oahu Interscholastic Association (OIA) selection as a senior. Francisco helped to lead Kahuku to their first State Championship in 2000.

== College career ==
Francisco recorded 88 tackles (43 solo) as a senior in 2004 at BYU. He finished his career with 330 tackles (167 solo) and seven interceptions and was named first-team All-Mountain West Conference selection as a junior in 2003.

== Professional career ==
After going undrafted in the 2005 NFL draft, Francisco signed with the Arizona Cardinals on May 2, 2005. He was waived on August 22, 2005.

Francisco signed with the New York Jets on August 29, 2005. He was waived soon after on September 3, 2005.

Francisco was signed to the Cardinals' practice squad on September 5, 2005. He was promoted to the active roster on October 11. He played in 53 regular season games, starting nine, for the Cardinals from 2005 to 2008. Francisco was famously defending Santonio Holmes on the Steelers' game winning touchdown in Super Bowl XLIII, a play which made the cover of Sports Illustrated. Francisco was released by the Cardinals on September 5, 2009.

Francisco signed with the Indianapolis Colts on September 7, 2009. He appeared in ten games, starting two, for the Colts in 2009. He also played in three playoff games.

Francisco became a free agent after the 2009 season, and signed with the Carolina Panthers on April 12, 2010. He was placed on injured reserve on September 4, and was released on September 8, 2010.

Francisco was signed by the Colts again on October 5, 2010. He played in 12 games, all starts, for Indianapolis during the 2010 season. He also started one playoff game and became a free agent afterwards.

Francisco signed with the Detroit Lions on August 17, 2011. He was released by the Lions on September 3, 2011.

Francisco signed a one-year deal with the Tennessee Titans on July 24, 2012. He was waived by the Titans on August 31, 2012.

== NFL career statistics ==
Legend
**Bold**	Career high

=== Regular season ===
Year	Team	Games		Tackles					Interceptions					Fumbles			
Year	Team	GP	GS	Cmb	Solo	Ast	Sck	TFL	Int	Yds	TD	Lng	PD	FF	FR	Yds	TD
2005	ARI	11	0	7	5	2	0.0	0	0	0	0	0	0	0	0	0	0
2006	ARI	**16**	2	49	41	8	0.0	1	**2**	**61**	0	**44**	**3**	0	0	0	0
2007	ARI	10	3	31	27	4	0.0	2	0	0	0	0	0	0	0	0	0
2008	ARI	**16**	4	56	**48**	8	0.0	2	0	0	0	0	1	**1**	0	0	0
2009	IND	10	2	16	16	0	0.0	1	0	0	0	0	0	0	0	0	0
2010	IND	12	**12**	**59**	45	**14**	0.0	**3**	**2**	10	0	11	**3**	0	0	0	0
		75	23	218	182	36	0.0	9	4	71	0	44	7	1	0	0	0

=== Playoffs ===
Year	Team	Games		Tackles					Interceptions					Fumbles			
Year	Team	GP	GS	Cmb	Solo	Ast	Sck	TFL	Int	Yds	TD	Lng	PD	FF	FR	Yds	TD
2008	ARI	**4**	**1**	**9**	**9**	0	0.0	0	**1**	**27**	0	**27**	**2**	0	0	0	0
2009	IND	3	0	0	0	0	0.0	0	0	0	0	0	0	0	0	0	0
2010	IND	1	**1**	5	5	0	0.0	0	0	0	0	0	0	0	0	0	0
		8	2	14	14	0	0.0	0	1	27	0	27	2	0	0	0	0
