= Gerald Hayes =

American football player (born 1980)

No. 54
- Position: Linebacker

Personal information
- Born: October 10, 1980 (age 46); Paterson, New Jersey, U.S.
- Listed height: 6 ft 1 in (1.85 m)
- Listed weight: 250 lb (113 kg)

Career information
- High school: Passaic County Technical Institute (Wayne, New Jersey)
- College: Pittsburgh
- NFL draft: 2003: 3rd round, 70th overall pick

Career history
- Arizona Cardinals (2003–2010); San Diego Chargers (2011)

Awards and highlights
- Second-team All-American (2002)

Career NFL statistics
- Total tackles: 431
- Sacks: 5.5
- Forced fumbles: 6
- Fumble recoveries: 6
- Interceptions: 4
- Defensive touchdowns: 2
- Stats at Pro Football Reference

Gerald Hayes (born October 10, 1980) is an American former professional football player who was a linebacker in the National Football League (NFL). He was selected by the Arizona Cardinals in the third round of the 2003 NFL draft. He played college football for the Pittsburgh Panthers.

== Early life ==
Hayes played his high school football at Passaic County Technical Institute. He was high school teammates with former NFL players Marcel Shipp and Mike Adams.

== College career ==
Hayes attended the University of Pittsburgh and was an Administration of Justice Major and a letterman in football. In football, he was a three-time All-Big East Conference selection and finished his college football career with 402 total tackles, 1.5 sacks, and two interceptions.

== Professional career ==
Pre-draft measurables
Height	Weight	Arm length	Hand span	20-yard shuttle	Three-cone drill	Vertical jump	Broad jump
6 ft 1 in (1.85 m)	238 lb (108 kg)	30 3/4 in (0.78 m)	9 1/4 in (0.23 m)	4.35 s	7.57 s	30 1/2 in (0.77 m)	8 ft 11 in (2.72 m)
All values from NFL Combine.

=== Arizona Cardinals ===
On April 18, 2006, he signed a one-year qualifying offer on playing his 4th season with the Cardinals.

He was released by Arizona on July 28, 2011.

=== San Diego Chargers ===
The San Diego Chargers signed Hayes on October 11, 2011. He was released on November 6, 2011.

== NFL career statistics ==
Legend
**Bold**	Career high

=== Regular season ===
Year	Team	Games		Tackles					Interceptions					Fumbles			
Year	Team	GP	GS	Cmb	Solo	Ast	Sck	TFL	Int	Yds	TD	Lng	PD	FF	FR	Yds	TD
2003	ARI	12	2	30	26	4	0.0	1	0	0	0	0	1	1	0	0	0
2004	ARI	**16**	1	26	22	4	0.0	2	0	0	0	0	0	1	1	0	0
2006	ARI	14	14	93	79	14	1.0	5	**3**	24	0	24	**6**	0	**2**	19	0
2007	ARI	**16**	**16**	**98**	**82**	16	**4.0**	**7**	1	**30**	**1**	**30**	3	0	0	0	0
2008	ARI	**16**	14	88	67	**21**	0.5	6	0	0	0	0	4	**4**	**2**	0	0
2009	ARI	14	13	63	50	13	0.0	**7**	0	0	0	0	0	0	0	0	0
2010	ARI	6	4	33	23	10	0.0	2	0	0	0	0	1	0	1	**21**	**1**
		94	64	431	349	82	5.5	30	4	54	1	30	15	6	6	40	1

=== Playoffs ===
Year	Team	Games		Tackles					Interceptions					Fumbles			
Year	Team	GP	GS	Cmb	Solo	Ast	Sck	TFL	Int	Yds	TD	Lng	PD	FF	FR	Yds	TD
2008	ARI	**4**	**4**	**19**	**14**	**5**	0.0	**2**	**1**	**6**	0	**6**	**1**	0	0	0	0
2009	ARI	1	1	1	1	0	0.0	0	0	0	0	0	0	0	0	0	0
		5	5	20	15	5	0.0	2	1	6	0	6	1	0	0	0	0
