= Jerome Boger =

American football official (born 1955)

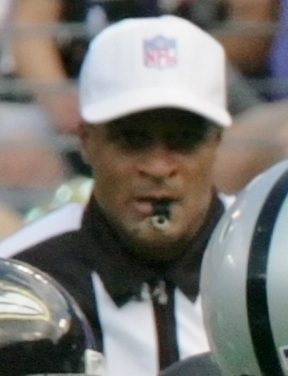
- Boger in 2006
- Born: Jerome Leonard Boger; July 1, 1955 (age 71); Atlanta, Georgia, U.S.
- Education: Morehouse College
- Occupation: NFL official (2004–2022)

Jerome Leonard Boger (/ˈboʊɡər/ BOH-gər; born July 1, 1955) is a former American football official who worked in the National Football League (NFL) for the 2004 through 2022 seasons. He wore uniform number 23 beginning in 2006; before that, he wore uniform number 109. He started in the league as a line judge and was promoted to referee in 2006 after two seasons. Along with Gene Steratore, he was one of two new referees for 2006, replacing retired officials Bernie Kukar and Tom White. Boger became the third African-American referee in the NFL after Johnny Grier (1988), who previously wore uniform number 23, and Mike Carey (1995).

== Personal life ==
Boger played quarterback at Morehouse College in Atlanta, Georgia as a four-year starter and graduated in 1977. Realizing that he did not have the elite football skills to make it on a professional level, he decided to get into officiating, allowing him to stay close to the game. He started working high school and recreational league games before moving up to small colleges. He spent 11 years in the Southern Intercollegiate Athletic Conference and five seasons in the Mid-Eastern Athletic Conference from 1996 to 2000.

Boger has a son, Tra Boger, who signed with the Green Bay Packers in the 2006 offseason, but was subsequently released. He later played defensive back in the Canadian Football League, and currently is an NFL official working as a line judge.

Boger resides in Conyers, Georgia. Outside of officiating, he worked as an underwriter for Allstate Insurance in Atlanta.

== Officiating career ==
Boger has also served as a referee in Conference USA, Arena Football League, and NFL Europe (where he officiated in World Bowl XIV).

Boger was promoted to referee in 2006.

Boger served as referee for a game between the Dallas Cowboys and Tennessee Titans during the 2006 season. In the third quarter of the game, Titans' defensive lineman Albert Haynesworth was ejected for stomping on the head of Cowboys offensive lineman Andre Gurode. Haynesworth received a five-game suspension as a result of the incident, the longest suspension for an on-field incident in NFL history at the time.

Boger also served as referee in 2006 in a Monday Night game where the Chicago Bears defeated the Arizona Cardinals in one of the greatest comebacks in league history.

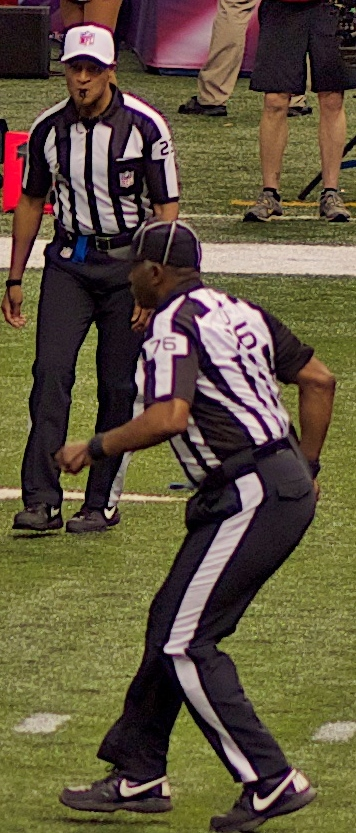
Boger and Darrell Jenkins working Super Bowl XLVII.

Boger was chosen to be the referee of Super Bowl XLVII, held at the Mercedes-Benz Superdome in New Orleans on February 3, 2013, only the second African-American to do so behind Mike Carey five years earlier. This caused several other NFL officials to question the leagues' officiating department's grading process, claiming that all of Boger's downgrades during the season were reversed. He was also the alternate referee of Super Bowl XLV, which was held on February 6, 2011, in Arlington, Texas.

=== Retirement ===
On March 2, 2023, Boger announced his retirement from officiating in the NFL.
