= Keith Rowen =

American football coach (born 1952)

Personal information
- Born: September 2, 1952 (age 74); New York City, New York, U.S.

Career information
- College: Stanford
- NFL draft: 1975: 11th round, 273rd overall pick

Career history
- Long Beach State (1977) Offensive line coach; University of Arizona (1979-1982) Offensive line coach; New Orleans Breakers (1983) Offensive line coach; New Orleans Breakers (1984) Offensive coordinator; Cleveland Browns (1984) Running backs coach; Indianapolis Colts (1985–1988) Offensive line coach; New England Patriots (1989) Special teams coach; Atlanta Falcons (1990–1993) Tight ends coach and offensive line coach; Minnesota Vikings (1994–1996) Offensive line coach; Oakland Raiders (1997–1998) Offensive line coach; Kansas City Chiefs (1999–2004) Tight ends coach; Arizona Cardinals (2005–2006) Offensive coordinator; Atlanta Falcons (2007) Tight ends coach

Awards and highlights
- First-team All-Pac-8 (1974); Second-team All-Pac-8 (1973)
- Coaching profile at Pro Football Reference

Keith Rowen (born September 2, 1952) is an American football coach. He served as the offensive coordinator for the Arizona Cardinals in 2005 until he was fired in October 2006 the day after the Cardinals lost to the Bears after leading by 20 points. He then moved to Atlanta, where he was the Falcons' tight end coach for the 2007 season, before moving to San Francisco for an office job with the Oakland Raiders.

As a player, he was drafted by the Philadelphia Eagles as a guard in the 11th round of the 1975 NFL draft with the 273rd overall pick.

Rowen is the son of Vic Rowen, who was the head coach at San Francisco State University from 1961 to 1989.
