= Neil Rackers =

American football player (born 1976)

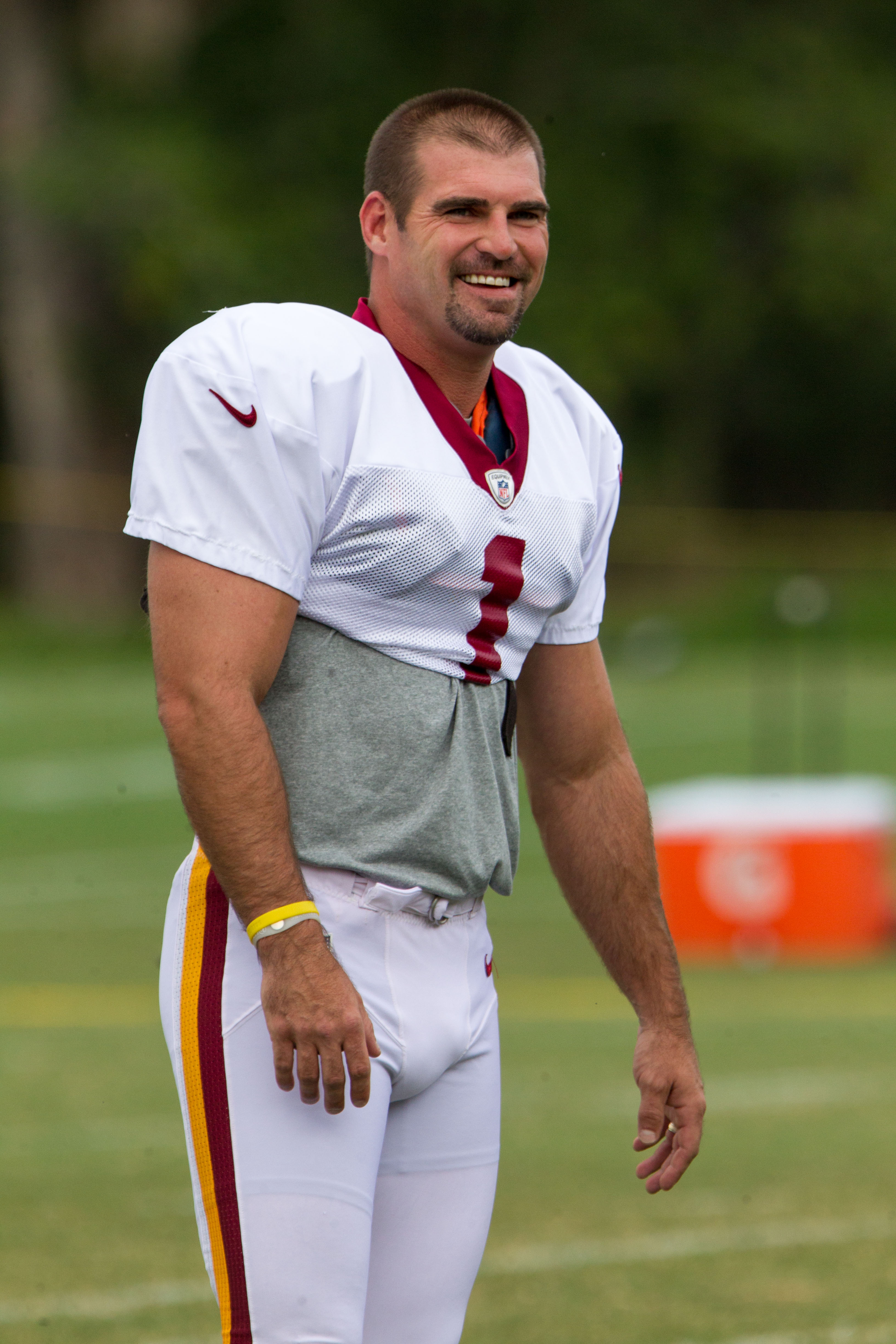
- Rackers with the Washington Redskins in 2012

No. 5, 1, 4
- Position: Placekicker

Personal information
- Born: August 16, 1976 (age 50); St. Louis, Missouri, U.S.
- Listed height: 6 ft 1 in (1.85 m)
- Listed weight: 207 lb (94 kg)

Career information
- High school: Aquinas-Mercy (St. Louis, Missouri)
- College: Illinois (1995–1999)
- NFL draft: 2000: 6th round, 169th overall pick

Career history
- Cincinnati Bengals (2000–2002); Arizona Cardinals (2003–2009); Houston Texans (2010–2011); Washington Redskins (2012)*
- * Offseason or practice squad member only

Awards and highlights
- First-team All-Pro (2005); Pro Bowl (2005); 2× leader in field goal attempts in the NFL (2005, 2006); PFW Golden Toe Award (2005); NFL records: Most field goals of 55 yards or more in one quarter: 2 (tied)

Career NFL statistics
- Field goals: 264
- Field goal attempts: 330
- Field goal %: 80
- Longest field goal: 57
- Stats at Pro Football Reference

Neil William Rackers (born August 16, 1976) is an American former professional football player who was a placekicker for 12 seasons in the National Football League (NFL). He played college football for the Illinois Fighting Illini. Rackers was selected by the Cincinnati Bengals in the sixth round of the 2000 NFL draft, and also played for the NFL's Arizona Cardinals and Houston Texans.

== Early life ==
Rackers attended Aquinas-Mercy High School in St. Louis, Missouri, and was a student and a letterman in football, soccer and baseball. In football, he was a two-year letterman and an All-Conference selection. In soccer, Rackers led his team to consecutive state titles and was an All-State selection. In baseball, he was an All-Conference selection.

== Professional career ==
=== Cincinnati Bengals ===
Rackers was selected in the sixth round of the 2000 NFL draft with the 169th overall pick by the Cincinnati Bengals. He played three seasons for the team, making 44 out of 67 field goals.

=== Arizona Cardinals ===
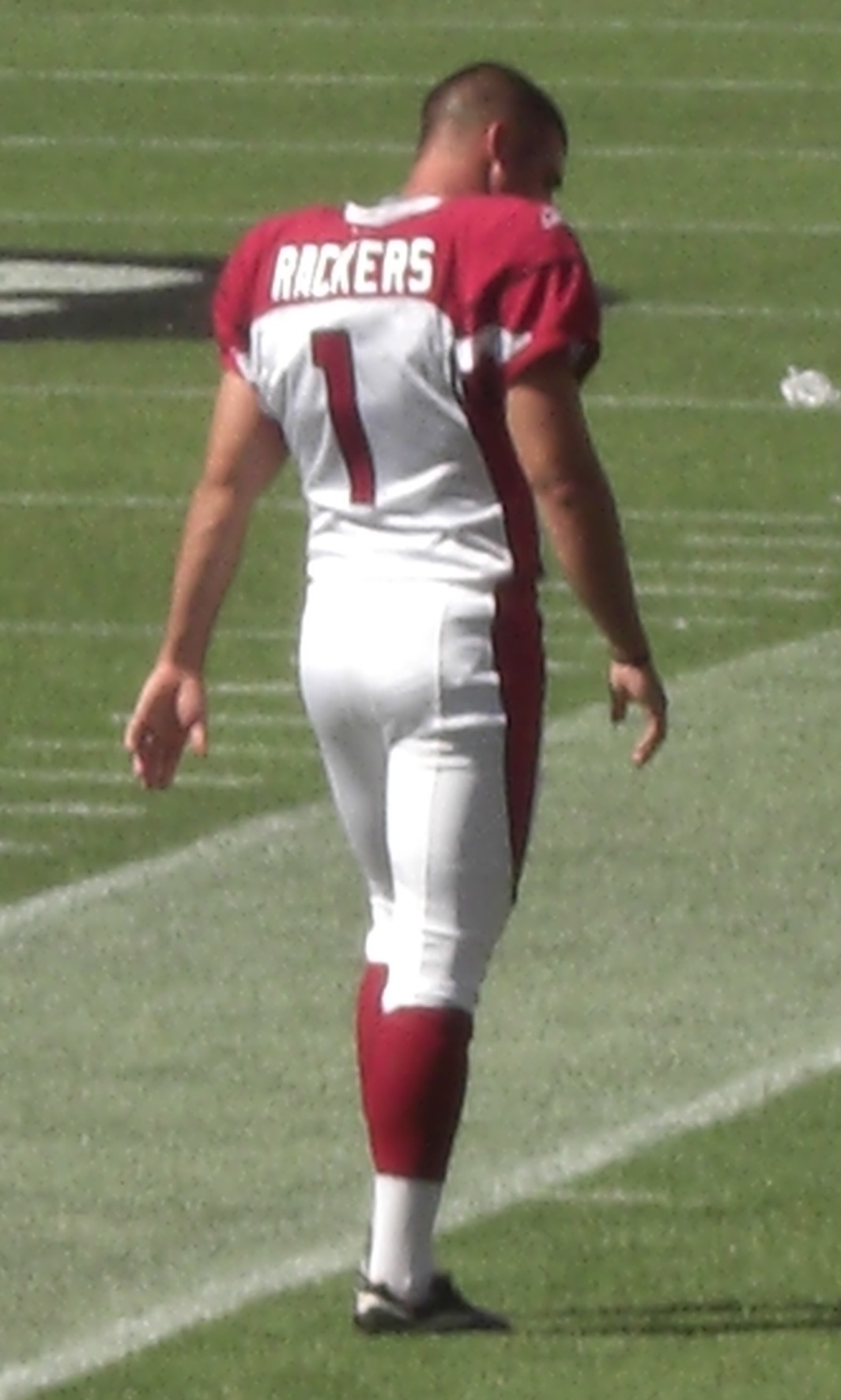
Rackers with the Cardinals in 2008

On October 24, 2004, Rackers tied a record by kicking three field goals of 50 yards or more (doing so from 50, 55, and 55 yards), doing so against the Seattle Seahawks. He was the second kicker to kick three 50+ yard field goals in the same game and also kick two from 55 yards since Morten Anderson did so in 1995. His two kicks in the second quarter made him the first kicker to kick two 50+ field goals in one quarter. When Josh Brown kicked one from 54 yards for the Seahawks, it marked the first game in NFL history where four field goals of 50 yards or more were kicked in the same game. The cleats that Rackers wore in the game (a 25–17 win) were sent to the Pro Football Hall of Fame after the game.

Rackers reached and or surpassed 20 touchbacks in a season twice in his career, and once had a streak of 31 consecutive field goals made before missing a 43-yarder in 2005 against the Jacksonville Jaguars. On New Year's Day in 2006, Rackers kicked his 40th field goal of the season, an NFL record. He was rewarded with a spot in that year's Pro Bowl. He is also one of the few players in NFL history to attempt a fair catch kick. On November 23, 2008, the Cardinals were playing the New York Giants when the Cardinals called for a fair catch with five seconds to go in the first half. As per the free-kick rule, Rackers was allowed to kick from the spot for a field goal attempt, which was at the 42-yard line of Arizona, 68 yards away. With only the punter holding the ball and no opponent lined up within ten yards of the ball, he missed the kick by a wide margin. In the 2008 season, Rackers made an appearance in Super Bowl XLIII, during which he kicked three extra points for the Cardinals. He is the longest tenured kicker in Cardinals history, having played in seven seasons for the team.

=== Houston Texans ===
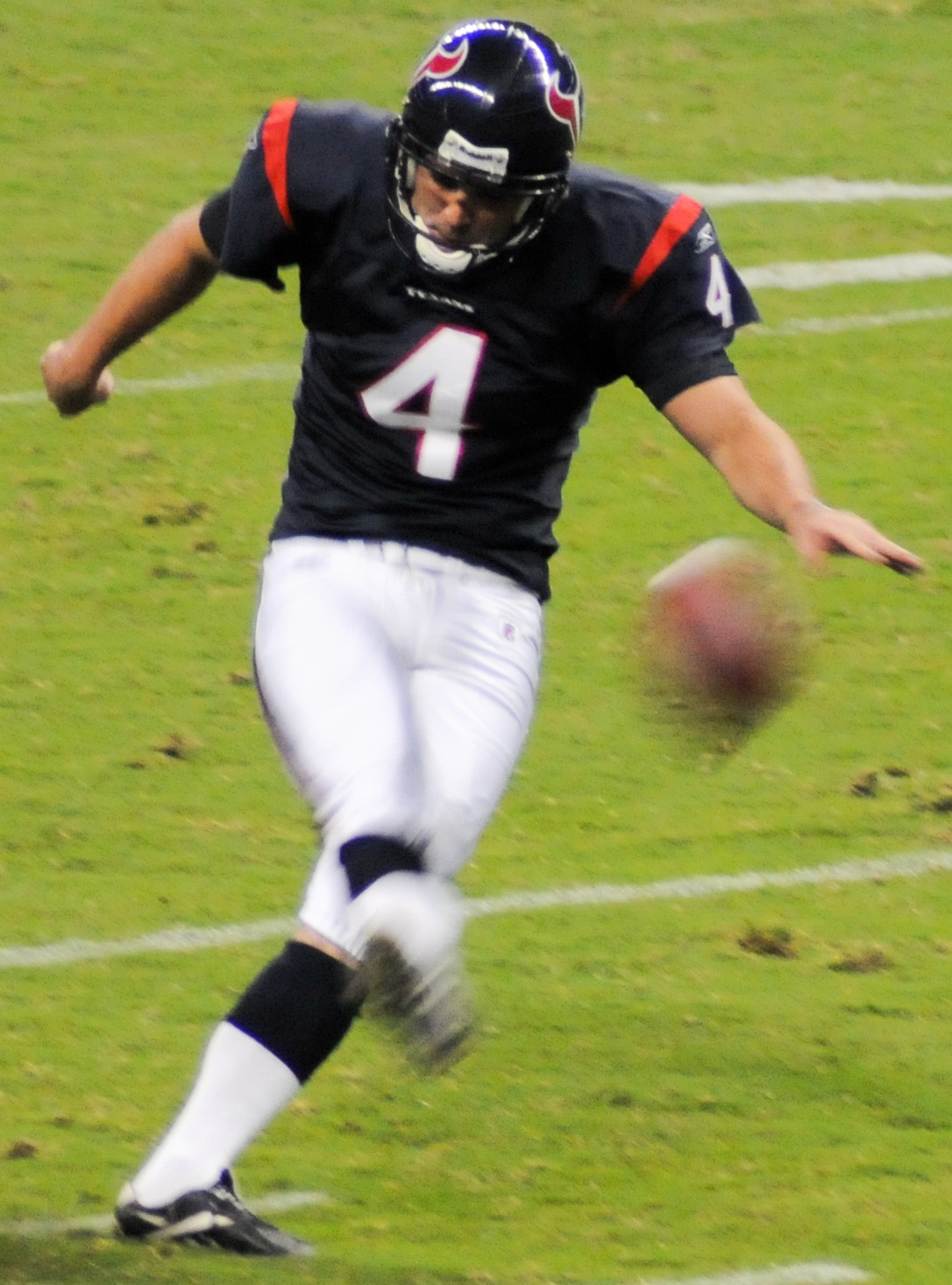
Rackers in a 2010 preseason game against the Dallas Cowboys

Rackers was signed by the Houston Texans on April 5, 2010, replaced Kris Brown later for the 2010 season, and made his first two field goals as a member of the Texans on September 12.

=== Washington Redskins ===
Rackers signed a one-year contract with the Washington Redskins on April 24, 2012, and competed with Graham Gano for a spot on the team. On August 27, the Redskins released Rackers.

=== Retirement ===
Billy Cundiff's charity confirmed that Rackers retired and would join his cause to cure ovarian cancer.

== Career regular season statistics ==
Career high/best bolded

Regular season statistics
Season	Team (record)	G	FGM	FGA	%	<20	20-29	30-39	40-49	50+	LNG	BLK	XPM	XPA	%	PTS
2000	CIN (4–12)	**16**	12	21	57.1	0–0	5–5	5–9	2–7	0–0	45	**2**	21	21	**100.0**	57
2001	CIN (6–10)	**16**	17	28	60.7	0–0	4–6	8–11	4–9	1–2	52	0	23	24	95.8	74
2002	CIN (2–14)	**16**	15	18	83.3	**2–2**	5–5	3–3	3–5	2–3	54	1	30	32	93.8	75
2003	ARI (4–12)	7	9	12	75.0	0–0	5–5	1–4	3–3	0–0	49	0	8	8	**100.0**	35
2004	ARI (6–10)	**16**	22	29	75.9	0–0	6–6	5–7	6–7	5–9	55	0	28	28	**100.0**	94
2005	ARI (5–11)	15	**40**	**42**	**95.2**	0–0	11–11	10–10	**13–14**	**6–7**	54	0	20	20	**100.0**	**140**
2006	ARI (5–11)	**16**	28	37	75.7	0–0	11–11	9–9	7–10	1–7	50	0	32	32	**100.0**	116
2007	ARI (8–8)	**16**	21	30	70.0	**2–2**	5–5	6–8	5–6	3–9	52	**2**	**47**	**48**	97.9	110
2008	ARI (9–7)	**16**	25	28	89.3	0–0	9–9	9–11	6–6	1–2	54	1	44	44	**100.0**	119
2009	ARI (10–6)	14	16	17	94.1	0–0	4–4	6–6	6–7	0–0	48	1	37	38	97.4	85
2010	HOU (6–10)	**16**	27	30	90.0	0–0	8–8	**11–11**	5–7	3–4	**57**	0	43	43	**100.0**	124
2011	HOU (10–6)	**16**	32	38	84.2	0–0	**14–14**	10–11	4–8	4–5	54	1	39	40	97.5	135
Career (12 seasons)		180	264	330	80.0	4–4	87–89	83–100	64–89	26–48	57	8	372	378	98.4	1164

== Life away from football ==
Rackers is the special teams coach at De Smet Jesuit in the St. Louis, Missouri area. He also sells roofs and does business as owner of an assisted living facility. He also owns Kick it Promos and is a radio announcer on 101 ESPN in St. Louis. He was inducted into the Missouri Sports Hall of Fame.
