= 1990 Allegheny Gators football team =

American college football team

1990 Allegheny Gators football

NCAA Division III champion NCAC champion

Stagg Bowl, W 21–14 vs. Lycoming
- Conference: North Coast Athletic Conference
- Record: 13–0–1 (7–0 NCAC)
- Head coach: Ken O'Keefe (1st season)
- Offensive coordinator: Joe Philbin (1st season)
- Defensive coordinator: Jack Leipheimer (2nd season)
- Captains: David LaCarte; John Marzka
- Home stadium: Robertson Field

1990 North Coast Athletic Conference football standings
	Conf.					Overall
Team	W		L		T	W		L		T
Allegheny $^	7	–	0	–	0	13	–	0	–	1
Ohio Wesleyan	7	–	1	–	0	9	–	1	–	0
Wittenberg	6	–	2	–	0	7	–	3	–	0
Kenyon	4	–	3	–	0	6	–	4	–	0
Denison	3	–	4	–	0	6	–	4	–	0
Wooster	3	–	5	–	0	3	–	7	–	0
Case Western Reserve	2	–	4	–	0	4	–	6	–	0
Earlham	1	–	6	–	0	2	–	8	–	0
Oberlin	0	–	8	–	0	1	–	9	–	0
$ – Conference champion; ^ – NCAA Division III playoff participant

The 1990 Allegheny Gators football team was an American football team that represented Allegheny College in the North Coast Athletic Conference (NCAC) during the 1990 NCAA Division III football season. The Gators compiled a 13–0–1 record, outscored opponents by a total of 442 to 171, and won the NCAC and NCAA Division III championships.

Led by first-year head coach Ken O'Keefe, the Gators struggled in the opening game, playing Juniata to a 30–30 tie. The team then won the remaining 13 games of the season, including playoff victories over Mount Union in the first round, Dayton in the quarterfinal, Central (Iowa) in the semifinal, and Lycoming in the 18th annual Amos Alonzo Stagg Bowl.

Ten Allegheny players received first-team honors on the 1990 All-NCAC honors. Quarterback Jeff Filkovski, linebacker Darren Hadlock, center John Marzka, and defensive back Tony Bifulco received All-America honors.

The team played its home games at Robertson Stadium/Frank B. Fuhrer Field in Meadville, Pennsylvania.

== Schedule ==
Date	Opponent	Site	Result	Attendance	Source
September 8	at Juniata*	Huntingdon, PA	T 30–30	1,300	
September 15	at Oberlin	Oberlin, OH	W 29–18	850	
September 22	Denison	Robertson Stadium; Meadville, PA	W 40–15	1,637	
September 29	at Earlham	Richmond, IN	W 62–0	750	
October 6	at Wooster	Wooster, OH	W 38–14	2,804	
October 13	Wittenberg	Robertson Stadium; Meadville, PA	W 38–0	1,803	
October 20	at Kenyon	Gambier, OH	W 24–18	1,500	
October 27	Ohio Wesleyan	Robertson Stadium; Meadville, PA	W 14–10	3,427	
November 3	Duquesne*	Robertson Stadium; Meadville, PA	W 51–0	1,948	
November 10	at Rochester*	Rochester, NY	W 14–7	1,023	
November 17	at Mount Union	Alliance, OH (NCAA Division III first round)	W 26–15	4,800	
November 24	Dayton	Robertson Stadium; Meadville, PA (NCAA Division III quarterfinal)	W 31–23	2,300	
December 1	at Central (IA)	Pella, IA (NCAA Division III semifinal)	W 24–7	3,200	
December 8	vs. Lycoming	Hawkins Stadium; Bradenton, FL (Stagg Bowl—NCAA Division III championship game)	W 21–14 ^{OT}	4,800	
*Non-conference game

== Personnel ==
=== Players ===
- Mike Adams, WR 6-1 180 Fr. Altoona, Pa. / Altoona Area
- Andy Barkley FB 6-0 223 Fr. Northfolk, Mass. / King Phillip
- 73 Delmar Becker OG 6-3 242 Sr. Mars, Pa. / Mars
- 62 Ron Bendekovic OT 6-0 271 So. Monaca, Pa. / Center
- Gabe Bender QB 6-0 170 Fr. Oklahoma City, Okla. / Heritage Hall
- 29 Tony Bifulco CB 5-9 180 Jr. Cheektowaga, N.Y. / West Seneca East
- 13 Todd Boledovic QB 6-3 180 So. Brook Park, Ohio / Berea
- 4 Steve Boucher PK 5-10 170 Sr. Lake City, Pa. / Girard
- 74 Fletcher Brooks DT 6-5 240 So. Simsbury, Conn. / Westminster School
- Eugene Calhoun DB 5-8 160 Fr. Cleveland, Ohio / St. Joseph’s
- 19 Ben Cammarano QB 6-3 200 Jr. West Seneca, N.Y. / South Park
- 80 Jim Carroll SE 6-2 197 Jr. Fortsmouth, R.I. / Worcester Academy
- Ken Clarke Fr. Winnetka, Ill.
- 39 Mike Collitt LB 6-1 215 Jr. Middlebury, Vt. / Union
- 36 Sean Cox FB 5-10 200 So. Ashtabula, Oho / Ashtabula
- 59 Tom Cvelbar OG 6-1 230 So. Euclid, Ohio / St. Joseph’s
- 96 Jeff Damico LB 5-10 205 Sr. Williamsville, N.Y. / Clarence Central
- 61 Joe DeBonis OG 6-3 190 So. Poultney, Vt. / Poultney
- Brad DeiCas QB 6-0 205 Fr. Charleroi, Pa. / Charleroi
- Mike Deluca TB 5-11 175 Fr. Rochester, N.Y. / Brighton
- 28 Matt Doheny FS 5-10 173 Jr. Alexandria Bay, N.Y. / Alexandria Central
- Craig Donghia FB 5-9 190 Fr. New Castle, Pa. / Mohawk
- Damon Dosch DB 6-0 175 Fr. Kittaning, Pa. / Kittaning
- 20 Stan Drayton TB 5-9 170 So. Cleveland, Ohio / John Marshall
- 21 Terrence Driscoll SS 5-10 175 Sr. Gillette, N.J. / White Hills Regional
- Brant Dubovick DL 6-2 225 Fr. Cutchoga, N.Y. / Mattituck
- 34 Jason Dvorsak DT 6-1 230 So. Avella, Pa. / Avella
- 69 Kurt Eimiller DT 5-11 198 So. Bemus Point, N.Y. / Jamestown
- 16 Nathan Elia CB 5-7 171 So. Milford, Mass. / Worcester Academy
- 18 Mark Ellermeyer LB 5-11 180 Jr. Butler, Pa. / North Hills
- 12 Jeff Filkovski QB 6-1 185 Sr. Penn, Pa. / Penn-Trafford
- Ed Foster WR 5-11 175 Fr. Glens Falla, N.Y. / Mt. Herman (Mass.)
- Tim Freshly WR 5-10 155 Fr. Alliance, Ohio / Marlington
- 99 Jeff Gamble DL 6-2 232 Jr. Leechburg, Pa. / Leechburg
- Rob Gardner WR 5-10 170 Fr. Euclid, Ohio / St. Joseph’s
- Charles Feiselhart DE 6-0 185 Fr. Pittsburgh, Pa. / Northgate
- 38 Jordan Geist RB 5-10 203 Sr. East Falmouth, Mass. / Falmouth
- 78 Ed Gerber OT 6-2 265 Jr. New Brighton, Pa. / New Brighton
- 41 Darren Hadlock LB 5-11 200 Jr. Plainfield, N.H. / Lebanon
- 93 Brian Haibach DE 6-1 200 So. Saegertown, Pa. / Saegertown
- 91 Scott Hardy FL 5-11 150 So. Pittsburgh, Pa. / North Catholic
- 98 Bill Henderson DE 6-2 205 So. Chagrin Falls, Ohio / Chagrin Falls
- Steve Hay QB 5-11 180 Fr. Somerset, Pa. / Somerset
- David Horn So. Pittsburgh, Pa.
- Robert Horrocks LB 6-0 190 Fr. Willoughby, Ohio / South
- 44 Chris Howard TE 6-0 200 Jr. McKeesport, Pa. / McKeesport Area
- Greg Hrebinko FB 6-0 180 Jr. Pittsburgh, Pa. / Chartiers Valley
- 47 Darren Hudson FL 5-11 150 So. Cleveland, Ohio / John Marshall
- 27 Curtis Island DB 5-9 174 Jr. Trumbull, Conn. / Trumbull
- Jamie Jones OL 6-4 310 Fr. Nitro, W. Va. / Nitro
- 11 Brian Kane CB 5-10 180 Sr. Painesville, Ohio / Lake Catholic
- Todd Kahm TE 6-5 200 Fr. Dunkirk, Ohio / Dunkirk
- 14 Mike Kitchen SS 5-8 176 So. Euclid, Ohio / Euclid
- Israel Klinger DB 5-10 170 Fr. Knox, Pa. / Keystone
- 77 Craig Kuhn OT 6-4 276 Jr. Waterford, Pa. / Fort LeBoeuf
- 35 David LaCarte* FS 6-2 190 Sr. Charleroi, Pa. / Charleroi
- Joe LaCarte DE 6-2 190 Fr. Charleroi, Pa. / Charleroi
- 24 Julia Lacayo FL 5-10 165 Jr. Annandale, Va. / Annandale
- 94 Sean Lattimore PK/P 6-0 190 So. Blawnox, Pa. / Fox Chapel
- 67 Adam Lechman C 6-2 209 Jr. Chagrin Falls, Ohio / Chagrin Falls
- 92 Paul Lockwood DT 6-3 225 Jr. Mountain Lakes, N.J. / Mountain Lakes
- 76 Paul Lynch C 6-2 205 So. Belgrade Lakes, Maine / Showhegan
- 43 Wayne Mack LB 6-0 190 So. Berea, Ohio / Berea
- 23 Eric Marohn FB 5-7 182 So. Clarendon Hills, Ill. / Hinsdale Central
- 64 John Marzka* C 6-0 220 Sr. Erie, Pa. / Erie Academy
- Ed Maynard QB 6-0 170 Fr. Smethport, Pa. / Smethport
- 75 T.J. McCarthy OT 6-2 256 Sr. Lowell, Mass. / Lowell
- Kevin McDowell QB 6-0 185 Fr. Bethel Park, Pa. / Bethel Park
- 65 Steve Menosky OG 6-1 225 Sr. Erie, Pa. / Erie Academy
- 26 Bill Miller RB 5-7 165 So. Oil City, Pa. / Oil City
- Craig Murowsky DL 6-1 220 Fr. Euclid, Ohio / Euclid
- Chris Nelson QB 6-3 185 Fr. Williamstown, W. Va. / Williamstown
- James Nesmith Fr. Painesville, Ohio
- Paris Nocera DE 6-0 188 Fr. Edinburg, Pa. / Mohawk
- 40 Jerry O’Brien TB 6-1 185 Sr. Pittsburgh, Pa. / North Catholic
- Matt Ohnemus WR 6-0 180 Fr. Waltham, Mass. / Worcester Academy
- 49 David Pape LB 5-11 191 Sr. Edinburg, Pa. / Mohawk
- 88 Derek Paxton DT 6-1 248 Sr. Cleveland Heights, Ohio / Shaw
- 70 Jeff Pearson NG 6-1 230 Jr. Titusville, Pa. / Titusville
- Scott Paschke TE 6-4 160 Fr. Chardon, Ohio / Newbury
- Joe Pass PK 5-11 165 Fr. Coraopolis, Pa. / Moon
- Mark Fellis DE 6-3 205 Fr. Greensburg, Pa. / Salem
- 83 John Ploeger DE 6-2 190 Jr. Pittsburgh, Pa. / Shady Side
- 42 Max Potter LB 5-10 180 So. Philadelphia, Pa. / St. Joe’s Prep
- 31 Craig Rankin FS 5-9 160 So. Avella, Pa. / Avella
- Kevin Rauch QB 6-1 180 Fr. Hermitage, Pa. / Hickory
- 82 Kurt Reiser TE 6-2 225 So. Butler, Pa. / Knoch
- Matt Ronca QB 5-11 180 Fr. York, Maine / York
- Trevor Rusert DB 5-10 175 Fr. Hamburg, N.Y / Hamburg
- 6 Mike Ryan FS 5-9 151 So. Cleveland, Ohio / Cleveland Heights
- Victor Samra Fr. Bronxville, N.Y.
- Ron Saunders DT 6-1 218 Sr. Grove City, Pa. / Grove City
- 87 Frank Scarvel Fl 5-11 168 So. Farrell, Pa. / Darrell
- 85 Mark Schreiber SE 5-9 178 So. St. Marys, Pa. / St. Marys
- Garth Selong WR 6-2 187 Fr. Middleburg Heights, Ohio / Midpark
- Sean Shannon TB 5-7 160 Fr. Sewickly, Pa. / Quaker Valley
- 30 Dale Shaw SS 5-8 171 Sr. Tarentum, Pa. / Highlands
- 7 Jay Smartz CB 5-11 192 Jr. Sharpsville, Pa. / Sharpsville
- 32 Doug Smith FB 5-10 185 Sr. Turnersville, N.J. / Washington Township
- 8 Jeff Snyder SS 5-11 175 So. Meadville, Pa. / Meadville
- Mark Spoerke WR 6-1 185 Fr. Parma Heights, Ohio / Valley Forge
- 53 John Stagnari OT 6-1 220 So. Andover, N.J. / Peddie School
- Jack Stokes TB 5-7 190 Fr. Belmont, Mass. / St. Sebastians
- 46 David Ufnar DE 6-0 209 Jr. Liverpool, N.Y. / Liverpool
- 66 Rob VanFosson OG 6-0 240 Jr. Massillon, Ohio / Jackson
- Martin Vaughn DB 6-0 170 Fr. Elizabeth, Pa. / Elizabeth Forward
- Greg Ward PK 5-11 165 Fr. Bethel Park, Pa. / Bethel Park
- Eric Watters TB 5-6 152 Fr. Girard, Pa. / Girard
- 10 Robert White CB 5-9 152 So. Rye, N.Y. / Rye
- 5 Peter Yoars QB 6-0 189 So. South Salem, N.Y. / Peddie School
- 84 John Yock DE 6-1 205 Jr. Cairnbrook, Pa. / Shade
- 81 Craig Zarzeczny TE 6-2 225 Jr. Harborcreek, Pa. / Harbor Creek

=== Coaching staff ===
- Head coach: Ken O’Keefe (first year)
- Assistant coaches:

Bob Fraser (defensive ends, special teams)
Andy Hoffman (graduate assistant, defensive line)
Jack Leipheimer (defensive backs, defensive coordinator)
Joe Philbin (offensive line, offensive coordinator)
Brian Swain (graduate assistant, receivers)
Kevin Wells (graduate assistant, linebackers)
Earnest Wilson (graduate assistant, offensive backs)
