= List of Towson Tigers football seasons =

The Towson Tigers football team represents Towson University in the NCAA Division I Football Championship Subdivision (FCS). In its 47 years as a program, the team has played in nearly 500 games, including 6 post-season appearances. The Tigers have played at all three levels of NCAA football (Division III, Division II, and Division I-AA/FCS) and are the only collegiate team to make the postseason at all three levels.

== Seasons ==
National champions †	Conference champions *	Post-Season Berth ^

List of seasons showing head coach, conference, conference finish, wins, losses, ties, post-season results and final poll standings.
Season	Head coach	Conference	Conference Finish	Wins	Losses	Ties	Post-Season Result	Sports Network/STATS Poll	Coaches' Poll
1969	Carl Runk	Mason-Dixon	5th	4	4	1	No playoff	-	-
1970	Carl Runk	Mason-Dixon	3rd	6	2	0	No playoff	-	-
1971	Carl Runk	Mason-Dixon	7th	1	8	0	No playoff	-	-
1972	Phil Albert	Mason-Dixon	5th	1	9	0	No playoff	-	-
1973	Phil Albert	Mason-Dixon	T–5th	4	4	0	Did not qualify	-	-
1974 *	Phil Albert	Mason-Dixon	1st	10	0	0	Did not qualify	-	-
1975	Phil Albert	NCAA Division III Independent	–	6	4	0	Did not qualify	-	-
1976 ^	Phil Albert	NCAA Division III Independent	–	10	3	0	Won First Round vs. C.W. Post, 14–10; Won Semifinals vs. St. Lawrence, 38–36; Lost Division III Championship (Stagg Bowl) vs. St. John's (MN), 28–31	-	-
1977	Phil Albert	NCAA Division III Independent	–	5	4	1	Did not qualify	-	-
1978	Phil Albert	NCAA Division III Independent	–	7	3	0	Did not qualify	-	-
1979	Phil Albert	NCAA Division II Independent	–	9	1	0	Did not qualify	NR	NR
1980	Phil Albert	NCAA Division II Independent	–	5	5	0	Did not qualify	NR	NR
1981	Phil Albert	NCAA Division II Independent	–	5	5	0	Did not qualify	NR	NR
1982	Phil Albert	NCAA Division II Independent	–	7	4	0	Did not qualify	NR	NR
1983 ^	Phil Albert	NCAA Division II Independent	–	10	2	0	Lost First Round vs. North Dakota State, 17–24	4	4
1984 ^	Phil Albert	NCAA Division II Independent	–	9	4	0	Won First Round vs. Norfolk State, 31–21; Lost Semifinals vs. Troy State, 3–45	8	8
1985	Phil Albert	NCAA Division II Independent	–	7	2	1	Did not qualify	10	10
1986 ^	Phil Albert	NCAA Division II Independent	–	8	3	1	Lost First Round vs. Central State, 0–31	10	10
1987	Phil Albert	NCAA Division I-AA Independent	–	4	6	0	Did not qualify	NR	NR
1988	Phil Albert	NCAA Division I-AA Independent	–	5	5	0	Did not qualify	NR	NR
1989	Phil Albert	NCAA Division I-AA Independent	–	2	8	0	Did not qualify	NR	NR
1990	Phil Albert	NCAA Division I-AA Independent	–	2	9	0	Did not qualify	NR	NR
1991	Phil Albert	NCAA Division I-AA Independent	–	1	10	0	Did not qualify	NR	NR
1992	Gordy Combs	NCAA Division I-AA Independent	–	5	5	0	Did not qualify	NR	NR
1993	Gordy Combs	NCAA Division I-AA Independent	–	8	2	0	Did not qualify	24	24
1994	Gordy Combs	NCAA Division I-AA Independent	–	8	2	0	Did not qualify	26	26
1995	Gordy Combs	NCAA Division I-AA Independent	–	6	4	0	Did not qualify	NR	NR
1996	Gordy Combs	NCAA Division I-AA Independent	–	6	4	0	Did not qualify	NR	NR
1997	Gordy Combs	Patriot League	7th	3	7	0	Did not qualify	NR	NR
1998	Gordy Combs	Patriot League	T–6th	5	6	0	Did not qualify	NR	NR
1999	Gordy Combs	Patriot League	3rd	7	4	0	Did not qualify	NR	NR
2000	Gordy Combs	Patriot League	4th	7	4	0	Did not qualify	NR	NR
2001	Gordy Combs	Patriot League	6th	3	7	0	Did not qualify	NR	NR
2002	Gordy Combs	Patriot League	5th	6	5	0	Did not qualify	NR	NR
2003	Gordy Combs	Patriot League	5th	6	6	0	Did not qualify	NR	NR
2004	Gordy Combs	A-10	12th	3	8	0	Did not qualify	NR	NR
2005	Gordy Combs	A-10	T–3rd (South Division)	6	6	0	Did not qualify	NR	NR
2006	Gordy Combs	A-10	3rd (South Division)	7	4	0	Did not qualify	NR	NR
2007	Gordy Combs	CAA	5th (South Division)	3	8	0	Did not qualify	NR	NR
2008	Gordy Combs	CAA	5th (South Division)	3	9	0	Did not qualify	NR	NR
2009	Rob Ambrose	CAA	6th (South Division)	2	9	0	Did not qualify	NR	NR
2010	Rob Ambrose	CAA	10th	1	10	0	Did not qualify	NR	NR
2011 *	Rob Ambrose	CAA	1st	9	3	0	Lost Second Round vs. Lehigh, 38–40	8	9
2012 *	Rob Ambrose	CAA	T–1st	7	4	0	Did not qualify	15	14
2013 ^	Rob Ambrose	CAA	T–2nd	13	3	0	Won Second Round vs. Fordham, 48–28; Won Quarterfinals vs. Eastern Illinois, 49–39; Won Semifinals vs. Eastern Washington, 35–31; Lost Division I Football Championship Game vs. North Dakota State, 7–35	2	2
2014	Rob Ambrose	CAA	T–10th	4	8	0	Did not qualify	NR	NR
2015	Rob Ambrose	CAA	T–4th	7	4	0	Did not qualify	NR	NR
2016	Rob Ambrose	CAA	T–8th	4	7	0	Did not qualify	NR	NR
2017	Rob Ambrose	CAA	T–7th	5	6	0	Did not qualify	NR	NR
2018 ^	Rob Ambrose	CAA	T–4th	7	5	0	Lost First Round vs. Duquesne, 10–31	20	22
2019	Rob Ambrose	CAA	T–9th	7	5	0	Did not qualify	RV	RV
2020	No team (Note: Towson opted out of the 2020 spring football season as a result of the COVID-19 pandemic.)								
2021	Rob Ambrose	CAA	T–9th	4	7	0	Did not qualify	NR	NR
2022	Rob Ambrose	CAA	T–6th	6	5	0	Did not qualify	NR	NR
2023	Pete Shinnick	CAA	T–6th	5	6	0	Did not qualify	NR	NR
2024	Pete Shinnick	CAA	T–6th	7	5	0	Did not qualify	NR	NR
2025	Pete Shinnick	CAA	T–7th	6	6	0	Did not qualify	NR	NR
