= Joe Bernard (American football) =

American college football coach

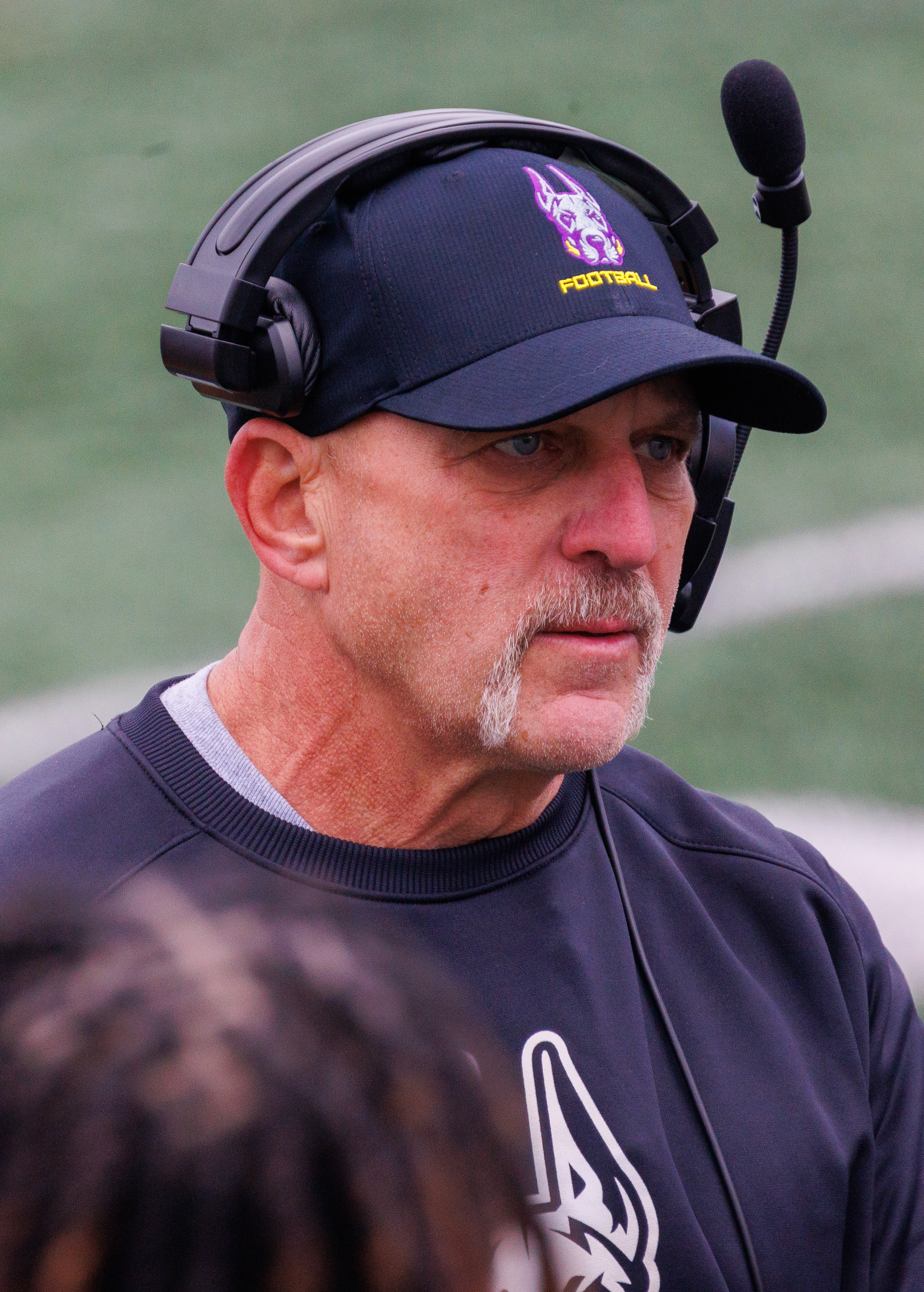

Current position
- Title: Special teams coordinator & safeties coach
- Team: Albany
- Conference: CAA Football

Biographical details
- Born: c. 1963 (age 62–63)

Coaching career (HC unless noted)
- 1983–1984: Bethlehem Catholic HS (PA) (assistant)
- 1985–1989: Nazareth HS (PA) (assistant)
- 1990–1995: Nazareth HS (PA)
- 1996–2000: Fairfield (DC)
- 2001–2002: Fairfield
- 2003–2008: Duquesne (DC)
- 2009–2010: Pittsburgh (strength consultant)
- 2011–2012: Stroudsburg HS (PA)
- 2013: Carolina Forest HS (SC) (OC)
- 2014: Albany (OC/RB)
- 2015–2017: Albany (AHC/OC/RB)
- 2018–2019: Albany (co-DC/ST)
- 2020–2022: Albany (DC/ST)
- 2023: Albany (ST/DL)
- 2024–present: Albany (ST/S)

Head coaching record
- Overall: 10–11 (college)

Joe Bernard (born c. 1963) is an American college football coach. He is the special teams coordinator and safeties coach at the University at Albany, SUNY, a position he has held since 2023. Bernard served as the head football coach at Fairfield University in Fairfield, Connecticut from 2001 to 2002.

== Early life and education ==
Bernard is from Parsippany-Troy Hills, New Jersey. He earned a degree in accounting at Moravian College, where he graduated in 1985. He then earned his master's degree in mathematics from East Stroudsburg University in 1988.

== Coaching career ==
Bernard served as Fairfield football program's second-ever (and final) head coach behind his mentor, Kevin Kiesel. Bernard was the Stags' head coach for the 2001 and 2002 seasons – the final two years before Fairfield abandoned its football program.

He moved on to become defensive coordinator at Duquesne in 2003. He then served as coordinator until February 2005, at which point he was also promoted as interim head coach due to former head coach Greg Gattuso's decision to leave and coach at Pittsburgh. Bernard served simultaneously as the head coach and defensive coordinator of the Dukes for two months, at which time he was relieved of head coaching duties by Jerry Schmidt. In 2009, Bernard left Duquesne to take a position with the Pittsburgh Panthers as a coaching consultant.

== Head coaching record ==
=== College ===
Year	Team	Overall	Conference	Standing	Bowl/playoffs
Fairfield Stags (Metro Atlantic Athletic Conference) (2001–2002)
2001	Fairfield	5–5	5–2	3rd	
2002	Fairfield	5–6	5–3	T–3rd	
Fairfield:		10–11	10–5		
Total:		10–11			
