= 1998 Fordham Rams football team =

American college football season

1998 Fordham Rams football
- Conference: Patriot League
- Record: 4–7 (2–4 Patriot)
- Head coach: Ken O'Keefe (1st season)
- Offensive coordinator: John Marzka (1st season)
- Defensive coordinator: Rich Nagy (1st season)
- Captains: Cliff Moseley; Steve O'Hare
- Home stadium: Coffey Field

1998 Patriot League football standings
	Conf.			Overall
Team	W		L	W		L
No. 7 Lehigh $^	6	–	0	12	–	1
No. 21 Colgate ^	5	–	1	8	–	4
Bucknell	3	–	3	6	–	5
Lafayette	3	–	3	3	–	8
Fordham	2	–	4	4	–	7
Towson	1	–	5	5	–	6
Holy Cross	1	–	5	2	–	9
$ – Conference champion; ^ – NCAA Division I-AA playoff participant; Rankings from The Sports Network poll

The 1998 Fordham Rams football team was an American football team that represented Fordham University during the 1998 NCAA Division I-AA football season. Fordham finished fifth in the Patriot League.

In their first and only year under head coach Ken O'Keefe, the Rams compiled a 4–7 record. Cliff Moseley and Steve O'Hare were the team captains.

The Rams were outscored 336 to 252. Their 2–4 conference record placed fifth in the seven-team Patriot League standings.

Fordham played its home games at Jack Coffey Field on the university campus in The Bronx, in New York City.

== Schedule ==
Date	Opponent	Site	Result	Attendance	Source
September 12	at Lehigh	Goodman Stadium; Bethlehem, PA	L 6–31	7,538	
September 19	at Bucknell	Christy Mathewson–Memorial Stadium; Lewisburg, PA	W 20–17	4,420	
September 26	at Towson	Minnegan Stadium; Towson, MD	L 34–35 ^{OT}	2,274	
October 3	Princeton*	Coffey Field; Bronx, NY	W 20–17 ^{OT}	5,900	
October 10	Penn*	Coffey Field; Bronx, NY	L 31–34	3,424	
October 17	at Brown*	Brown Stadium; Providence, RI	L 27–38	4,439	
October 24	Colgate^{†}	Coffey Field; Bronx, NY	L 20–42	6,186	
October 31	Villanova*	Coffey Field; Bronx, NY	L 12–45	2,312	
November 7	Lafayette	Coffey Field; Bronx, NY	L 20–27	1,711	
November 14	at Holy Cross	Fitton Field; Worcester, MA (rivalry)	W 13–10	5,189	
November 21	Georgetown*	Coffey Field; Bronx, NY	W 49–40	2,782	
*Non-conference game; ^{†}Homecoming
