= Leipheimer =

Leipheimer is a surname. Notable people with the surname include:

- Jack Leipheimer (born c. 1951), American football coach
- Levi Leipheimer (born 1973), American cyclist
  - Levi Leipheimer's King Ridge GranFondo, cyclist race
