= 1998 Fairfield Stags football team =

American college football season

1998 Fairfield Stags football

MAAC co-champion
- Conference: Metro Atlantic Athletic Conference
- Record: 9–2 (7–1 MAAC)
- Head coach: Kevin Kiesel (3rd season)
- Home stadium: Alumni Stadium

1998 Metro Atlantic Athletic Conference football standings
	Conf.			Overall
Team	W		L	W		L
Fairfield +	7	–	1	9	–	2
Georgetown +	7	–	1	9	–	2
Duquesne	6	–	2	8	–	3
Marist	6	–	2	7	–	3
St. John's	4	–	4	6	–	5
Iona	2	–	6	4	–	6
Siena	2	–	6	3	–	6
Canisius	2	–	6	3	–	7
Saint Peter's	0	–	8	0	–	10
+ – Conference co-champions

The 1998 Fairfield Stags football team was an American football team that represented Fairfield University of Fairfield, Connecticut, as a member of the Metro Atlantic Athletic Conference (MAAC) during the 1998 NCAA Division I-AA football season. In their third year under head coach Kevin Kiesel, the team compiled a 9–2 record (7–1 in conference games), tied with Georgetown for the MAAC championship, and outscored opponents by a total of 346 to 131. They lost two of the first three games, but closed with an eight-game winning streak. The team led the nation in both rushing defense (61.7 yards per game) and total defense (213.8 per game).

The team gained 4,096 yards of total offense while holding opponents to 2,352 yards. Quarterback Jim Lopusznick led the offense with 2,055 passing yards and 27 passing touchdowns and was selected as the 1998 MAAC Offensive Player of the Year. Fullback Dan Fitzpatrick was selected as MAAC Rookie of the Year, and Kevin Kiesel was selected as the MAAC co-Coach of the Year. On defense, linebacker Steve Norcini led the team with 75 total tackles (52 solo), and defensive end Steve Krines led the way with 14 tackles for loss and 4.5 sacks.

This was the first and only conference championship in Fairfield football history, as the university eliminated the football program in January 2003. In 2024, the team was inducted as a group into the Fairfield Athletics Hall of Fame.

== Schedule ==
Date	Time	Opponent	Site	Result	Attendance	Source
September 5	1:00 p.m.	at Holy Cross*	Fitton Field; Worcester, MA	L 22–26	5,216	
September 12	1:00 p.m.	Iona	Alumni Stadium; Fairfield, CT	W 42–21	2,269	
September 19	1:00 p.m.	at Marist	Leonidoff Field; Poughkeepsie, NY	L 17–20	1,906	
September 26	1:00 p.m.	Georgetown^{†}	Alumni Stadium; Fairfield, CT	W 24–17	4,217	
October 3	1:35 p.m.	at Duquesne	Arthur J. Rooney Athletic Field; Pittsburgh, PA	W 23–20	2,648	
October 17		at San Diego*	Torero Stadium; San Diego, CA	W 24–7	4,000	
October 24	1:00 p.m.	Canisius	Alumni Stadium; Fairfield, CT	W 42–0	2,179	
October 31	1:00 p.m.	at Siena	Heritage Park; Colonie, NY	W 38–0	1,200	
November 6	7:30 p.m.	at St. John's	DaSilva Memorial Field; Queens, NY	W 40–14	1,067	
November 14	1:00 p.m.	Saint Peter's	Alumni Stadium; Fairfield, CT	W 48–0	1,950	
November 21	12:00 p.m.	at Central Connecticut State*	Arute Field; New Britain, CT	W 26–6	615	
*Non-conference game; ^{†}Homecoming; All times are in Eastern time

== Game summaries ==
=== Holy Cross ===
Team	1	2	3	4	Total
Fairfield	0	13	0	9	22
• Holy Cross	19	7	0	0	26

- Date: September 5
- Location: Worcester, MA
- Game attendance: 5,216

On September 5, Fairfield opened its season with a 26–22 loss to Holy Cross. Holy Cross took a 26–0 lead after 17 minutes of action. Fairfield came back with 22 unanswered points, including a 75-yard pass from quarterback Jim Lopusznick to Eric Wise and a one-yard quarterback sneak by Lopusznick. Fairfield drove to the Holy Cross 12-yard line with 2:42 remaining, but a penalty stalled the drive. After the game, Fairfield coach Kevin Kiesel said "we kept our poise, didn't panic, and showed a lot of guts."

=== Iona ===
Team	1	2	3	4	Total
Iona	7	7	0	7	21
• Fairfield	3	8	17	14	42

- Date: September 12
- Location: Fairfield, CT
- Game attendance: 2,269

On September 12, Fairfield defeated Iona, 42-21, at Alumni Field in Fairfield, Connecticut. Iona took a 14-3 lead early. Fairfeld scored 31 points in the second half. Marvin Royal tallied 144 rushing yards, and quarterback Jim Lopusznick completed 16 of 27 passes for 176 yards and four touchdowns. The team's total of 42 points broke the school's single-game scoring record.

=== Marist ===
Team	1	2	3	4	Total
Fairfield	0	0	7	10	17
• Marist	7	6	0	7	20

- Date: September 19
- Location: Poughkeepsie, NY
- Game attendance: 1,906

On September 19, Fairfield lost to Marist, 20–17, at Poughkeepsie, New York. For the third consecutive week, Fairfield fell behind early, trailing, 13-0, at halftime. The Stags scored 17 points in the second half, including a 28-yard touchdown pass from Jim Lopusznick to Marvin Royal. Marist scored on a one-yard touchdown run with 4:35 remaining, and Fairfield responded with a 37-yard touchdown pass from Lopusznick to Steve Hadley with less than two minutes left in the game. Fairfield attempted an onside kick, but Marist recovered the kick and ran out the clock, as Fairfield's comeback effort fell short.

=== Georgetown ===
Team	1	2	3	4	Total
Georgetown	14	0	0	3	17
• Fairfield	7	3	0	14	24

- Date: September 28
- Location: Fairfield, CT
- Game attendance: 4,217

On September 28, Fairfield defeated Georgetown, 24–17, at homecoming in Fairfield, Connecticut. Georgetown took a 14–10 lead at halftime. Fairfield scored 14 points in the fourth quarter. Quarterback Jim Lopusznick completed 14 of 30 passes for 140 yards and two touchdowns. Running back Marvin Royal set a school record with 224 rushing yards and scored the winning touchdown on a 66-yard run with 3:37 remaining in the game.

=== Duquesne ===
Team	1	2	3	4	OT	Total
• Fairfield	3	0	0	14	6	23
Duquesne	7	7	3	0	3	20

- Date: October 3
- Location: Pittsburgh, PA
- Game attendance: 2,648

On October 3, Fairfield defeated Duquesne, 23–20, in Pittsburgh. Duquesne took a 17–3 into the fourth quarter. Quarterback Jim Lopusznick then led Fairfield on a fourth-quarter comeback with a three-yard pass to Joe Milligan with 8:26 remaining and a four-yard pass to Eric Wise with 10 second remaining. In overtime, Lopusznick won the game with a one-yard touchdown run. After the game, Fairfield head coach called it "probably one of the finest college football games I've been a part of."

=== San Diego ===
Team	1	2	3	4	Total
• Fairfield	3	14	0	7	24
San Diego	0	0	7	0	7

- Date: October 17
- Location: San Diego, CA
- Game attendance: 4,000

On October 17, Fairfield defeated the San Diego Toreros, 24–7, in San Diego. Quarterback Jim Lopusznick threw three touchdown passes, and Stephen Mirasolo kicked a 36-yard field goal.

=== Canisius ===
Team	1	2	3	4	Total
Canisius	0	0	0	0	0
• Fairfield	7	21	14	0	42

- Date: October 24
- Location: Fairfield, CT
- Game attendance: 2,197

On October 24, the Stags defeated Canisius, 42–0, before a crowd of 2,179 at Fairfield, Connecticut. The Fairfield defense held Canisius to six first downs and 147 yards of total offense. Fairfield quarterback Jim Lopusznick completed 17 of 24 passes for 241 yards and threw for four touchdowns and ran for two others.

=== Siena ===
Team	1	2	3	4	Total
• Fairfield	7	17	7	7	38
Siena	0	0	0	0	0

- Date: October 31
- Location: Colonie, NY
- Game attendance: 1,200

On October 31, Fairfield defeated Siena, 38–0, at Colonie, New York. Quarterback Jim Lopusznick passed for four touchdowns, and receiver Eric Wise caught nine passes for 120 yards. Marques Burgess also intercepted a pass and returned it 69 yards for a touchdown.

=== St. John's ===
Team	1	2	3	4	Total
• Fairfield	3	7	10	20	40
St. John's	0	7	7	0	14

- Date: November 6
- Location: Queens, NY
- Game attendance: 1,067

On November 6, Fairfield defeated St. John's, 40–14, at Queens, New York. Quarterback Jim Lopusznick tallied five touchdowns, two rushing and three by passing. Freshman Dan Fitzpatrick also ran for 129 yards and a touchdown.

=== Saint Peter's ===
Team	1	2	3	4	Total
Saint Peter's	0	0	0	0	0
• Fairfield	21	13	7	7	48

- Date: November 14
- Location: Fairfield, CT
- Game attendance: 1,950

On November 14, the Stags defeated Saint Peter's, 48–0, in Fairfield, Connecticut. Dan Fitzpatrick rushed for 174 yards and three rushing touchdowns, and quarterback Jim Lopusznick had two passing touchdowns and a rushing touchdown. With the victory, Fairfield its first clinched conference championship. On defense, Fairfield intercepted four passes and held Saint Peter's to 56 rushing yards and 31 passing yards.

=== Central Connecticut ===
Team	1	2	3	4	Total
• Fairfield	14	6	0	6	26
Central Connecticut State	0	0	0	6	6

- Date: November 21
- Location: New Britain, CT
- Game attendance: 615

On November 21, Fairfield defeated Central Connecticut State, 26–6, at New Britain, Connecticut. Freshman fullback Dan Fitzpatrick ran for 108 yards and a touchdown. Quarterback Jim Lopusznick ran for a touchdown and passed for another. Free safety Chris Silvestri also scored on a 40-yard interception return.

== Players ==
- Derrick Aldridge, linebacker, junior, 5'10", 200 pounds, Holbrook, MA
- Marques Burgess, linebacker, sophomore, 6'0", 215 pounds, Amityville, NY
- Brian Caswell, defensive back, 6'1", 180 pounds, Marshfield, MA
- Matt Costanzo, linebacker, 5'11", 230 pounds, Netcong, NJ
- Jason Cowley, tight end, sophomore, 6'7", 215 pounds, Seacaucus, NY
- Brandon Csaszar, offensive tackle, junior, 6'3", 295 pounds, Bethlehem, PA
- Brian Curci, wide receiver, junior, 5'7", 171 pounds, Doylestown, PA
- Ralph Danise, center, freshman, 6'0", 250 pounds, Long Beach, NY
- Steve Dogmantis, strong safety, sophomore, 6'0", 190 pounds, Whitehall, PA
- Mike Dontas, offensive guard, sophomore, 6'4", 282 pounds, Bethlehem, PA
- Lomax Edwards, defensive back, junior, 5'11", 180 pounds, Roxbury, MA
- Dan Fitzpatrick, fullback, freshman, 5'11", 210 pounds, Amityville, NY
- Patrick Grugan, nose guard, sophomore, 6'0", 226 pounds, Aston, PA
- Stephen Hadley, wide receiver, sophomore, 5'11", 163 pounds, Jacksonville, FL
- Ben Harvey, offensive tackle, sophomore, 6'4", 261 pounds, Westboro, MA
- Steve Krines, defensive end, junior, 6'3", 235 pounds, Huntington, NY
- Jim Lopusznick, quarterback, junior, 5'10", 175 pounds, Leonardo, NJ
- Nathan Lusas, defensive back, sophomore, 5'10", 190 pounds, Melrose, MA
- Joe Milligan, wide receiver, junior, 5'10", 190 pounds, Norristown, PA
- Stephen Mirasolo, kicker, freshman, 5'6", 160 pounds, Peabody, MA
- Steve Norcini, linebacker, sophomore, 6'0", 215 pounds, Berwyn, PA
- Marvin Royal, running back, sophomore, 5'10", 190 pounds, Pleasantville, NJ
- Joseph Roberts, defensive tackle, freshman, 6'1", 242 pounds, Forked River, NJ
- Chris Silvestri, free safety, senior, 6'1", 190 pounds, New Canaan, CT
- Tom Unger, defensive tackle, junior, 6'1", 235 pounds, Guilford, Ct
- Detrick Watson, strong safety, sophomore, 5'11", 206 pounds, Trenton, NJ
- Eric Wise, wide receiver, junior, 6'1", 195 pounds, Reading, PA

== Statistics ==
=== Team statistics ===
On offense, Fairfield tallied 4,096 yards of total offense per game (372.4 per game), consisting of 1,980 rushing yards (180.0 per game) and 2,116 passing yards (192.4 per game).

On defense, they held opponents to 2,352 yards of total offense (213.8 per game), consisting of 679 rushing yards (61.7 per game) and 1,673 passing yards (152.1 per game).

=== Individual statistics ===
Passing

1. Jim Lopusanick - 168 of 294 (57.1%) for 2,055 yards, 27 touchdowns, 12 interceptions, 138.0 passer rating

Rushing

1. Marvin Royal - 832 yards on 169 carries (4.9 yards per carry), 1 touchdown
2. Dan Fitzpatrick - 612 yards on 111 carries (5.5 yards per carry), 7 touchdowns
3. Jim Lopusznick - 245 yards on 111 carries (2.5 yards per carry), 6 touchdowns
4. Detrick Watson - 116 yards on 21 carries (5.5 yards per carry), 2 touchdowns

Receiving

1. Eric Wise - 72 receptions for 838 yards (11.6-yard average), 10 touchdowns
2. Steven Hadley - 35 receptions for 522 yards (14.9-yard average), 9 touchdowns
3. Joe Milligan - 23 receptions for 235 yards (10.2-yard average), 4 touchdowns
4. Jason Cowley - 11 receptions for 142 yards (12.9-yard average), 0 touchdowns
5. Brian Curci - 10 receptions for 129 yards (12.9-yard average), 1 touchdown

Scoring

1. Eric Wise (WR) - 62 points, 10 touchdowns, 1 two-point conversion
2. Steve Mirasolo (K) - 60 points, 33 of 35 PAT, 9 of 10 field goals
3. Steve Hadley (WR) - 54 points, 9 touchdowns
4. Dan Fitzpatrick (FB) - 48 points, 8 touchdowns
5. Jim Lopusznick (QB) - 38 points, 6 touchdowns, 1 two-point conversion
6. Joe Milligan (WR) - 24 points, 4 touchdowns

Tackles

1. Steve Norcini (LB) - 75 total tackles, 52 solo tackles, 13 tackles for loss, 3.0 sacks
2. Chris Silvestri (FS) - 62 total tackles, 45 solo tackles, 3 tackles for loss, 0 sacks
3. Marques Burgess (LB) - 62 total tackles, 43 solo tackles, 7 tackles for loss, 1.5 sacks
4. Steve Dogmantle (SS) - 42 total tackles, 29 tackles for loss, 9 tackles for loss0 sacks
5. Patrick Grugan (NG) - 42 total tackles, 25 solo tackles, 10 tackles for loss, 2.5 sacks
6. Steve Krines (DE) - 41 total tackles, 28 solo tackles, 14 tackles for loss, 4.5 sacks
7. Tom Unger (DT) - 39 total tackles, 24 solo tackles, 12 tackles for loss, 1.0 sacks

== Awards and honors ==
Fairfield dominated MAAC honors with the following award winners:

- Junior quarterback Jim Lopusznick was selected as the 1998 MAAC Offensive Player of the Year.
- Freshman fullback Dan Fitzpatrick was selected as the 1998 MAAC Rookie of the Year.
- Head coach Kevin Keisel shared Coach of the Year honors with Bob Benson of Georgetown.

In addition, five Fairfield players received first-team all-conference honors: Lopusznick; sophomore running back Marvin Royal; offensive lineman Ben Harvey; defensive lineman Steve Krines; and free safety Chris Silvestri.
