= 1998 Colgate Red Raiders football team =

American college football season

1998 Colgate Red Raiders football

NCAA Division I-AA First Round, L 28–49 at Georgia Southern
- Conference: Patriot League

Ranking
- Sports Network: No. 21
- Record: 8–4 (5–1 Patriot)
- Head coach: Dick Biddle (3rd season)
- Captains: Luke George; Corey Hill
- Home stadium: Andy Kerr Stadium

1998 Patriot League football standings
	Conf.			Overall
Team	W		L	W		L
No. 7 Lehigh $^	6	–	0	12	–	1
No. 21 Colgate ^	5	–	1	8	–	4
Bucknell	3	–	3	6	–	5
Lafayette	3	–	3	3	–	8
Fordham	2	–	4	4	–	7
Towson	1	–	5	5	–	6
Holy Cross	1	–	5	2	–	9
$ – Conference champion; ^ – NCAA Division I-AA playoff participant; Rankings from The Sports Network poll

The 1998 Colgate Red Raiders football team was an American football team that represented Colgate University during the 1998 NCAA Division I-AA football season. A year after winning the conference championship, Colgate finished second in the Patriot League.

In its third season under head coach Dick Biddle, the team compiled an 8–4 record. Corey Hill and Luke George were the team captains.

The Red Raiders outscored opponents 419 to 328. Their 5–1 conference record placed second in the seven-team Patriot League standings.

Though Colgate failed to repeat as Patriot League champion, the Red Raiders did qualify for the Division I-AA playoffs for the second year in a row. Colgate lost in the first round of the national tournament, to No. 2 Georgia Southern. Unranked throughout the regular season, Colgate was No. 21 in the final national poll.

The team played its home games at Andy Kerr Stadium in Hamilton, New York.

== Schedule ==
Date	Opponent	Site	Result	Attendance	Source
September 5	Connecticut*	Andy Kerr Stadium; Hamilton, NY	L 35–45	5,000	
September 19	at Towson	Minnegan Stadium; Towson, MD	W 35–14	2,012	
September 26	Harvard*	Andy Kerr Stadium; Hamilton, NY	W 34–14	9,355	
October 3	at Yale*	Yale Bowl; New Haven, CT	W 35–17	13,519	
October 10	Dartmouth*	Andy Kerr Stadium; Hamilton, NY	W 45–24	5,755	
October 17	at Navy*	Navy–Marine Corps Memorial Stadium; Annapolis, MD	L 35–42	28,504	
October 24	at Fordham	Coffey Field; Bronx, NY	W 42–20	6,186	
October 31	at Bucknell	Christy Mathewson–Memorial Stadium; Lewisburg, PA	W 38–21	6,250	
November 7	at No. 23 Lehigh	Goodman Stadium; Bethlehem, PA	L 22–41	13,432	
November 14	Lafayette	Andy Kerr Stadium; Hamilton, NY	W 42–27	3,006	
November 21	Holy Cross	Andy Kerr Stadium; Hamilton, NY	W 28–14	3,021	
November 28	at No. 1 Georgia Southern*	Paulson Stadium; Statesboro, GA (NCAA Division I-AA First Round)	L 28–49	7,676	
*Non-conference game; Rankings from The Sports Network Poll released prior to the game
