= The Battle for Greater Baltimore =

American college football rivalry

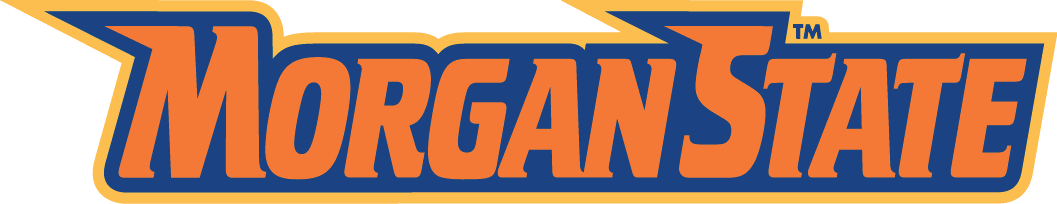
- Morgan State Bears Towson Tigers
- Sport: Football
- First meeting: September 1, 1979; Morgan State, 34–7
- Latest meeting: September 20, 2026; Morgan State, 41–26
- Next meeting: September 18, 2027

Statistics
- Total meetings: 31
- All-time series: Towson leads, 24–7
- Largest victory: Towson, 56–12 (1993)
- Longest win streak: Towson, 9 (1982–1998)
- Current win streak: Morgan State, 1 (2026–present)

Locations in Greater Baltimore area.

The Battle for Greater Baltimore also known as the Morgan State–Towson rivalry is an American football rivalry between the Morgan State University Bears and the Towson University Tigers. This matchup is between the only two teams in the NCAA Division I Football Championship Subdivision (FCS) in both the Baltimore area and the entire state of Maryland.

== Game results ==
Morgan State victories	Towson victories

No.	Date	Location	Winner	Score
1	September 1, 1979	Towson, MD	Morgan State	34–7
2	September 6, 1980	Baltimore, MD	Morgan State	14–10
3	September 5, 1981	Towson, MD	Morgan State	17–13
4	October 9, 1982	Towson, MD	Towson	17–10
5	October 8, 1983	Towson, MD	Towson	48–0
6	November 10, 1984	Baltimore, MD	Towson	38–7
7	October 19, 1985	Towson, MD	Towson	52–8
8	October 18, 1986	Baltimore, MD	Towson	21–0
9	October 17, 1987	Towson, MD	Towson	39–10
10	November 20, 1993	Baltimore, MD	Towson	56–12
11	November 19, 1994	Towson, MD	Towson	42–7
12	September 3, 1998	Towson, MD	Towson	15–10
13	October 9, 1999	Baltimore, MD	Morgan State	28–22
14	September 16, 2000	Towson, MD	Towson	31–7
15	September 29, 2001	Baltimore, MD	Towson	20–17
16	September 5, 2002	Towson, MD	Towson	49–28

No.	Date	Location	Winner	Score
17	August 30, 2003	Baltimore, MD	Morgan State	19–16
18	September 1, 2005	Towson, MD	Towson	29–26
19	September 2, 2006	Towson, MD	Towson	30–2
20	September 8, 2007	Baltimore, MD	Towson	28–21
21	September 6, 2008	Towson, MD	Towson	21–16
22	September 26, 2009	Baltimore, MD	Morgan State	12–9
23	September 3, 2011	Towson, MD	Towson	42–3
24	September 2, 2017	Towson, MD	Towson	10–0
25	September 1, 2018	Baltimore, MD	Towson	36–10
26	September 4, 2021	Baltimore, MD	Towson	31–0
27	September 10, 2022	Towson, MD	Towson	29–21
28	September 16, 2023	Baltimore, MD	Towson	20–10
29	September 7, 2024	Towson, MD	Towson	14–9
30	September 6, 2025	Baltimore, MD	Towson	27–22
31	September 20, 2026	Towson, MD	Morgan State	41–26
Series: Towson leads 24–7

== See also ==
- List of NCAA college football rivalry games
