= 1998 Bucknell Bison football team =

American college football season

1998 Bucknell Bison football
- Conference: Patriot League
- Record: 6–5 (3–3 Patriot)
- Head coach: Tom Gadd (4th season)
- Captains: Erich Muzi; Jeremy Myers; Neal Thompson
- Home stadium: Christy Mathewson–Memorial Stadium

1998 Patriot League football standings
	Conf.			Overall
Team	W		L	W		L
No. 7 Lehigh $^	6	–	0	12	–	1
No. 21 Colgate ^	5	–	1	8	–	4
Bucknell	3	–	3	6	–	5
Lafayette	3	–	3	3	–	8
Fordham	2	–	4	4	–	7
Towson	1	–	5	5	–	6
Holy Cross	1	–	5	2	–	9
$ – Conference champion; ^ – NCAA Division I-AA playoff participant; Rankings from The Sports Network poll

The 1998 Bucknell Bison football team was an American football team that represented Bucknell University during the 1998 NCAA Division I-AA football season. It tied for third in the Patriot League.

Bucknell played its home games at Christy Mathewson–Memorial Stadium on the university campus in Lewisburg, Pennsylvania.

In its fourth year under head coach Tom Gadd, the Bison compiled a 6–5 record. Erich Muzi, Jeremy Myers and Neal Thompson were the team captains.

The Bison outscored opponents 278 to 243. Their 3–3 conference record tied for third in the seven-team Patriot League standings.

== Schedule ==
Date	Opponent	Site	Result	Attendance	Source
September 5	at Duquesne*	Rooney Field; Pittsburgh, PA	W 38–10	5,210	
September 12	Saint Mary's (CA)*	Christy Mathewson–Memorial Stadium; Lewisburg, PA	W 30–14	4,572	
September 19	Fordham	Christy Mathewson–Memorial Stadium; Lewisburg, PA	L 17–20	4,420	
September 26	at Columbia^*	Christy Mathewson–Memorial Stadium; Lewisburg, PA	W 27–20	9,000	
October 3	at Penn*	Franklin Field; Philadelphia, PA	L 10–20	10,809	
October 17	at Cornell*	Schoellkopf Field; Ithaca, NY	L 19–23	13,188	
October 24	at Lafayette^{†}	Christy Mathewson–Memorial Stadium; Lewisburg, PA	W 33–22	8,500	
October 31	Colgate	Christy Mathewson–Memorial Stadium; Lewisburg, PA	L 21–38	6,250	
November 7	at Holy Cross*	Fitton Field; Worcester, MA	W 30–14	8,125	
November 14	at No. 20 Lehigh	Goodman Stadium; Bethlehem, PA	L 7–49	9,178	
November 21	Towson*	Christy Mathewson–Memorial Stadium; Lewisburg, PA	W 46–13	2,423	
*Non-conference game; ^{†}Homecoming; ^ Parents Weekend; Rankings from The Sports Network Poll released prior to the game
