= 1998 Dartmouth Big Green football team =

American college football season

1998 Dartmouth Big Green football
- Conference: Ivy League
- Record: 2–8 (1–6 Ivy)
- Head coach: John Lyons (7th season)
- Offensive coordinator: Roger Hughes (7th season)
- Defensive coordinator: Tom Gilmore (2nd season)
- Captains: Josh Bloom; Hunter Buckner
- Home stadium: Memorial Field

1998 Ivy League football standings
	Conf.			Overall
Team	W		L	W		L
Penn $	6	–	1	8	–	2
Brown	5	–	2	7	–	3
Yale	5	–	2	6	–	4
Princeton	4	–	3	5	–	5
Columbia	3	–	4	4	–	6
Harvard	3	–	4	4	–	6
Cornell	1	–	6	4	–	6
Dartmouth	1	–	6	2	–	8
$ – Conference champion

The 1998 Dartmouth Big Green football team was an American football team that represented Dartmouth College during the 1998 NCAA Division I-AA football season. The Big Green tied for last place in the Ivy League.

In its seventh season under head coach John Lyons, the team compiled a 2–8 record and was outscored 226 to 142. Johnathan Gibbs, Kyle Rogers and Adam Young were the team captains.

The Big Green's 1–6 conference record tied for seventh (and worst) in the Ivy League standings. Dartmouth was outscored 157 to 102 by Ivy opponents.

Dartmouth played its home games at Memorial Field on the college campus in Hanover, New Hampshire.

== Schedule ==
Date	Opponent	Site	Result	Attendance	Source
September 19	Penn	Memorial Field; Hanover, NH	L 14–17	8,519	
September 26	at Maine*	Alfond Stadium; Orono, ME	L 3–14	6,541	
October 3	Lafayette*	Memorial Field; Hanover, NH	W 13–10 ^{OT}	5,903	
October 10	at Colgate*	Andy Kerr Stadium; Hamilton, NY	L 24–45	5,755	
October 17	Yale^{†}	Memorial Field; Hanover, NH	W 22–19	12,017	
October 24	at Cornell	Schoellkopf Field; Ithaca, NY (rivalry)	L 11–14	10,301	
October 31	Harvard	Memorial Field; Hanover, NH (rivalry)	L 7–20	7,031	
November 7	Columbia	Memorial Field; Hanover, NH	L 14–24	4,117	
November 14	at Brown	Brown Stadium; Providence, RI	L 21–28	8,323	
November 21	at Princeton	Princeton Stadium; Princeton, NJ	L 13–35	19,067	
*Non-conference game; ^{†}Homecoming
