= 1998 Columbia Lions football team =

American college football season

1998 Columbia Lions football
- Conference: Ivy League
- Record: 4–6 (3–4 Ivy)
- Head coach: Ray Tellier (10th season)
- Captains: Bert Bondi; Paul Roland; Jeremy Taylor; Chris Tillotson
- Home stadium: Wien Stadium

1998 Ivy League football standings
	Conf.			Overall
Team	W		L	W		L
Penn $	6	–	1	8	–	2
Brown	5	–	2	7	–	3
Yale	5	–	2	6	–	4
Princeton	4	–	3	5	–	5
Columbia	3	–	4	4	–	6
Harvard	3	–	4	4	–	6
Cornell	1	–	6	4	–	6
Dartmouth	1	–	6	2	–	8
$ – Conference champion

The 1998 Columbia Lions football team was an American football team that represented Columbia University during the 1998 NCAA Division I-AA football season. Columbia tied for fifth in the Ivy League.

In their 10th season under head coach Ray Tellier, the Lions compiled a 4–6 record and were outscored 175 to 146. Bert Bondi, Paul Roland, Jeremy Taylor and Chris Tillotson were the team captains.

The Lions' 3–4 conference record tied for fifth in the Ivy League standings. Columbia was outscored 111 to 87 by Ivy opponents.

Columbia played its homes games at Lawrence A. Wien Stadium in Upper Manhattan, in New York City.

== Schedule ==
Date	Opponent	Site	Result	Attendance	Source
September 19	Harvard^{†}	Wien Stadium; New York, NY	W 24–0	11,175	
September 26	at Bucknell*	Christy Mathewson–Memorial Stadium; Lewisburg, PA	L 20–27	9,000	
October 3	at Saint Mary's (CA)*	Saint Mary's Stadium; Moraga, CA	W 20–17	4,967	
October 10	No. 10 Lehigh*	Wien Stadium; New York, NY	L 19–20	3,675	
October 17	at Penn	Franklin Field; Philadelphia, PA	L 0–20	8,108	
October 24	at Yale	Yale Bowl; New Haven, CT	L 14–37	14,537	
October 31	Princeton	Wien Stadium; New York, NY	L 0–20	6,740	
November 7	at Dartmouth	Memorial Field; Hanover, NH	W 24–14	4,117	
November 14	Cornell	Wien Stadium; New York, NY (rivalry)	W 22–10	6,845	
November 21	Brown	Wien Stadium; New York, NY	L 3–10	4,600	
*Non-conference game; ^{†}Homecoming; Rankings from The Sports Network Poll released prior to the game
