= 1998 Harvard Crimson football team =

American college football season

1998 Harvard Crimson football
- Conference: Ivy League
- Record: 4–6 (3–4 Ivy)
- Head coach: Timothy Murphy (5th season)
- Co-offensive coordinators: Jay Mills (3rd season); Joe Philbin (2nd season)
- Offensive scheme: Multiple
- Captain: Brendan Bibro
- Home stadium: Harvard Stadium

1998 Ivy League football standings
	Conf.			Overall
Team	W		L	W		L
Penn $	6	–	1	8	–	2
Brown	5	–	2	7	–	3
Yale	5	–	2	6	–	4
Princeton	4	–	3	5	–	5
Columbia	3	–	4	4	–	6
Harvard	3	–	4	4	–	6
Cornell	1	–	6	4	–	6
Dartmouth	1	–	6	2	–	8
$ – Conference champion

The 1998 Harvard Crimson football team was an American football team that represented Harvard University during the 1998 NCAA Division I-AA football season. The Crimson tied for fifth in the Ivy League.

In their fifth year under head coach Timothy Murphy, the Crimson compiled a 4–6 record and were outscored 211 to 136. Brendan Bibro was the team captain.

Harvard's 3–4 conference record tied for fifth in the Ivy League standings. The Crimson were outscored 142 to 86 by Ivy opponents.

Harvard played its home games at Harvard Stadium in the Allston neighborhood of Boston, Massachusetts.

== Schedule ==
Date	Opponent	Site	Result	Attendance	Source
September 19	at Columbia	Wien Stadium; New York, NY	L 0–24	11,175	
September 26	at Colgate*	Andy Kerr Stadium; Hamilton, NY	L 14–34	9,355	
October 3	No. 12 Lehigh*	Harvard Stadium; Boston, MA	L 17–21	5,270	
October 10	Cornell	Harvard Stadium; Boston, MA	W 19–12	6,075	
October 17	Holy Cross*	Harvard Stadium; Boston, MA	W 20–14 ^{OT}	5,574	
October 24	at Princeton	Princeton Stadium; Princeton, NJ	W 23–22	25,388	
October 31	at Dartmouth	Memorial Field; Hanover, NH (rivalry)	W 20–7	7,031	
November 7	Brown	Harvard Stadium; Boston, MA	L 6–27	8,067	
November 14	at Penn	Franklin Field; Philadelphia, PA	L 10–41	14,909	
November 21	Yale	Harvard Stadium; Boston, MA (The Game)	L 7–9	27,787	
*Non-conference game; Rankings from The Sports Network Poll released prior to the game
