= 1998 Princeton Tigers football team =

American college football season

1998 Princeton Tigers football
- Conference: Ivy League
- Record: 5–5 (4–3 Ivy)
- Head coach: Steve Tosches (12th season)
- Captain: Dan Swingos
- Home stadium: Princeton Stadium

1998 Ivy League football standings
	Conf.			Overall
Team	W		L	W		L
Penn $	6	–	1	8	–	2
Brown	5	–	2	7	–	3
Yale	5	–	2	6	–	4
Princeton	4	–	3	5	–	5
Columbia	3	–	4	4	–	6
Harvard	3	–	4	4	–	6
Cornell	1	–	6	4	–	6
Dartmouth	1	–	6	2	–	8
$ – Conference champion

The 1998 Princeton Tigers football team was an American football team that represented Princeton University during the 1998 NCAA Division I-AA football season. In its inaugural year at Princeton Stadium, the Tigers finished fourth in the Ivy League.

In their 12th year under head coach Steve Tosches, the Tigers compiled a 5–5 record and outscored opponents 229 to 165. Dan Swingos was the team captain.

Princeton's 4–3 conference record placed fourth in the Ivy League standings. The Tigers outscored Ivy opponents 156 to 111.

Princeton's first game of the season was the opener for its new home field, Princeton Stadium, built on the site of the former Palmer Stadium on the university campus in Princeton, New Jersey. Because of the demolition and construction project, Princeton had played its 1997 season entirely on the road, making the September 19 home opener its first home game in a year and a half.

== Schedule ==
Date	Opponent	Site	Result	Attendance	Source
September 19	Cornell	Princeton Stadium; Princeton, NJ	W 6–0	27,800	
September 26	at No. 15 Lehigh*	Goodman Stadium; Bethlehem, PA	L 24–31 ^{OT}	10,136	
October 3	at Fordham*	Coffey Field; Bronx, NY	L 17–20 ^{OT}	5,900	
October 10	Brown	Princeton Stadium; Princeton, NJ	W 31–17	18,622	
October 17	at Lafayette*	Fisher Field; Easton, PA	W 20–0	8,039	
October 24	Harvard	Princeton Stadium; Princeton, NJ (rivalry)	L 22–23	25,388	
October 31	at Columbia	Wien Stadium; New York, NY	W 20–0	6,740	
November 7	Penn	Princeton Stadium; Princeton, NJ (rivalry)	L 14–27	20,230	
November 14	at Yale	Yale Bowl; New Haven, CT (rivalry)	L 28–31	18,210	
November 21	Dartmouth	Princeton Stadium; Princeton, NJ	W 35–13	19,067	
*Non-conference game; Rankings from The Sports Network Poll released prior to the game
