= Pete Mangurian =

American football player and coach (born 1955)

Biographical details
- Born: June 17, 1955 (age 71); Los Angeles, California, U.S.

Playing career
- 1975–1978: LSU
- Position: Defensive tackle

Coaching career (HC unless noted)
- 1979–1980: SMU (assistant OL)
- 1981: New Mexico State (OL)
- 1982–1983: Stanford (OL)
- 1984–1987: LSU (OL)
- 1988–1990: Denver Broncos (TE/HB)
- 1991–1992: Denver Broncos (OL)
- 1993–1996: New York Giants (OL)
- 1997: Atlanta Falcons (OL)
- 1998–2000: Cornell
- 2001–2002: Atlanta Falcons (OL)
- 2003: Atlanta Falcons (OC)
- 2005–2008: New England Patriots (TE)
- 2009–2010: Tampa Bay Buccaneers (OL)
- 2012–2014: Columbia
- 2020: Tampa Bay Vipers (TE)
- 2023: San Antonio Brahmas (OL)

Head coaching record
- Overall: 19–41

Peter K. Mangurian (born June 17, 1955) is an American football coach and former player. He was formerly the tight ends coach for the Tampa Bay Vipers of the XFL and Offensive line coach for the San Antonio Brahmas. Mangurian has been a longtime assistant coach in the National Football League (NFL) as a tight end coach, offensive line coach, and offensive coordinator. He has coached in two Super Bowls and two Pro Bowls and numerous playoff appearances during his tenure as an NFL coach. Mangurian also was the head football coach at Cornell University from 1998 to 2000 and at Columbia University from 2012 to 2014.

== Playing career ==
Mangurian attended Louisiana State University from 1975 to 1978, where he played football as a defensive tackle. He was a member of Delta Kappa Epsilon fraternity.

== Coaching career ==
=== College ===
Mangurian began his coaching career as the assistant offensive line coach at Southern Methodist University in 1979 through 1980. In 1981, he spent one season at New Mexico State University as their offensive line coach. He then moved to Stanford University as their offensive line coach in 1982 and 1983 before returning to his alma mater, Louisiana State University, as their offensive line coach from 1984 to 1987. LSU went to four Bowl games during his time in Baton Rouge. Mangurian returned to the college ranks from 1998–2000 as Head Coach of Cornell University. He later returned to the Ivy League as Head Coach of Columbia University in December 2011.

=== NFL ===
Mangurian was hired by head coach Dan Reeves of the Denver Broncos in 1988 and served as the team's tight ends/H-backs coach until before the 1991 season, when he was promoted to the offensive line position. He coached in Super Bowl XXIV against the San Francisco 49ers. He also coached in the Pro Bowl in 1991. Mangurian followed Reeves to the New York Giants in 1993 as their offensive line coach. He was with the Giants for four years as their offensive line coach. Mangurian again followed Reeves as his offensive line coach, this time to the Atlanta Falcons. However, after one season, Mangurian left the Falcons to become head coach at Cornell. In 2001, Mangurian returned to Reeves staff in Atlanta as offensive line coach, and was promoted to offensive coordinator for the 2003 season. The New England Patriots hired him as their tight end coach in 2005. He was with the Patriots for four years and coached in Super Bowl XLII against the Giants. He then went on to coach the offensive line for Tampa Bay for two years.

=== XFL ===
In 2019, Mangurian became the tight ends coach for the Tampa Bay Vipers of the XFL under Marc Trestman. Mangurian was officially hired by the San Antonio Brahmas on September 13, 2022

Mangurian retired following the 2023 XFL season after the departure of Head Coach Hines Ward.

== Head coaching record ==
| Year | Team | Overall | Conference | Standing | Bowl/playoffs |
|---|---|---|---|---|---|
Cornell Big Red (Ivy League) (1998–2000)
| 1998 | Cornell | 4–6 | 1–6 | T–7th | |
| 1999 | Cornell | 7–3 | 5–2 | 3rd | |
| 2000 | Cornell | 5–5 | 5–2 | 2nd | |
| Cornell: | | 16–14 | 11–10 | | |
Columbia Lions (Ivy League) (2012–2014)
| 2012 | Columbia | 3–7 | 2–5 | T–6th | |
| 2013 | Columbia | 0–10 | 0–7 | 8th | |
| 2014 | Columbia | 0–10 | 0–7 | 8th | |
| Columbia: | | 3–27 | 2–19 | | |
| Total: | | 19–41 | | | |

== Personal life ==
Mangurian and his wife Amy have three children, Lauren, Katie and Will.
