= 1998 Yale Bulldogs football team =

American college football season

1998 Yale Bulldogs football
- Conference: Ivy League
- Record: 6–4 (5–2 Ivy)
- Head coach: Jack Siedlecki (2nd season)
- Home stadium: Yale Bowl

1998 Ivy League football standings
| | Conf. | | | Overall |
| Team | W | | L | W | | L |
|---|---|---|---|---|---|---|
| Penn $ | 6 | – | 1 | 8 | – | 2 |
| Brown | 5 | – | 2 | 7 | – | 3 |
| Yale | 5 | – | 2 | 6 | – | 4 |
| Princeton | 4 | – | 3 | 5 | – | 5 |
| Columbia | 3 | – | 4 | 4 | – | 6 |
| Harvard | 3 | – | 4 | 4 | – | 6 |
| Cornell | 1 | – | 6 | 4 | – | 6 |
| Dartmouth | 1 | – | 6 | 2 | – | 8 |
$ – Conference champion

The 1998 Yale Bulldogs football team represented Yale University in the 1998 NCAA Division I-AA football season. The Bulldogs were led by second-year head coach Jack Siedlecki, played their home games at the Yale Bowl and finished tied for second place in the Ivy League with a 5–2 record, 6–4 overall.

== Schedule ==
| Date | Opponent | Site | Result | Attendance | Source |
|---|---|---|---|---|---|
| September 19 | at Brown | Brown Stadium; Providence, RI | W 30–28 | 8,375 | |
| September 26 | Connecticut* | Yale Bowl; New Haven, CT | L 21–63 | 17,827 | |
| October 3 | Colgate* | Yale Bowl; New Haven, CT | L 17–35 | 13,519 | |
| October 10 | Holy Cross* | Yale Bowl; New Haven, CT | W 15–7 | 3,750 | |
| October 17 | at Dartmouth | Memorial Field; Hanover, NH | L 19–22 | 12,017 | |
| October 24 | Columbia | Yale Bowl; New Haven, CT | W 37–14 | 14,537 | |
| October 31 | at Penn | Franklin Field; Philadelphia, PA | L 21–34 | 20,875 | |
| November 7 | Cornell | Yale Bowl; New Haven, CT | W 28–21 | 12,595 | |
| November 14 | Princeton | Yale Bowl; New Haven, CT (rivalry) | W 31–28 | 18,210 | |
| November 21 | at Harvard | Harvard Stadium; Boston, MA (The Game) | W 9–7 | 27,787 | |
*Non-conference game
