= 1998 Canisius Golden Griffins football team =

American college football season

1998 Canisius Golden Griffins football
- Conference: Metro Atlantic Athletic Conference
- Record: 3–7 (2–6 MAAC)
- Head coach: Chuck Williams (4th season)
- Home stadium: Demske Field

1998 Metro Atlantic Athletic Conference football standings
	Conf.			Overall
Team	W		L	W		L
Fairfield +	7	–	1	9	–	2
Georgetown +	7	–	1	9	–	2
Duquesne	6	–	2	8	–	3
Marist	6	–	2	7	–	3
St. John's	4	–	4	6	–	5
Iona	2	–	6	4	–	6
Siena	2	–	6	3	–	6
Canisius	2	–	6	3	–	7
Saint Peter's	0	–	8	0	–	10
+ – Conference co-champions

The 1998 Canisius Golden Griffins football team represented Canisius College as a member of the Metro Atlantic Athletic Conference (MAAC) during the 1998 NCAA Division I-AA football season. Led by fourth-year head coach Chuck Williams, the Golden Griffins compiled an overall record of 3–7 with a mark of 2–6 in conference play, placing in a three-way tie for sixth in the MAAC. The Canisius offense scored 120 points while the defense allowed 284 points.

== Schedule ==
Date	Opponent	Site	Result	Attendance	Source
September 12	at Gannon*	Sox Harrison Stadium; Edinboro, PA	W 19–0	1,000	
September 19	Saint Peter's	Demske Field; Buffalo, NY	W 30–2	1,017	
September 26	Siena	Demske Field; Buffalo, NY	W 22–7	1,067	
October 3	at Iona	Mazzella Field; New Rochelle, NY	L 14–27	875	
October 10	at Georgetown	Kehoe Field; Washington, DC	L 0–28	1,010	
October 17	at Buffalo*	University at Buffalo Stadium; Amherst, NY	L 0–47	20,079	
October 24	at Fairfield	Alumni Stadium; Fairfield, CT	L 0–42	2,179	
October 31	St. John's	Demske Field; Buffalo, NY	L 14–30	537	
November 7	at Marist	Leonidoff Field; Poughkeepsie, NY	L 0–60	1,050	
November 14	Duquesne	Demske Field; Buffalo, NY	L 21–41	537	
*Non-conference game
