= 1998 Cornell Big Red football team =

American college football season

1998 Cornell Big Red football
- Conference: Ivy League
- Record: 4–6 (1–6 Ivy)
- Head coach: Pete Mangurian (1st season)
- Defensive coordinator: Greg Gigantino (1st season)
- Captains: John Hanson; Mike Hood
- Home stadium: Schoellkopf Field

1998 Ivy League football standings
	Conf.			Overall
Team	W		L	W		L
Penn $	6	–	1	8	–	2
Brown	5	–	2	7	–	3
Yale	5	–	2	6	–	4
Princeton	4	–	3	5	–	5
Columbia	3	–	4	4	–	6
Harvard	3	–	4	4	–	6
Cornell	1	–	6	4	–	6
Dartmouth	1	–	6	2	–	8
$ – Conference champion

The 1998 Cornell Big Red football team was an American football team that represented Cornell University during the 1998 NCAA Division I-AA football season. Cornell tied for second-to-last in the Ivy League.

In its first season under head coach Pete Mangurian, the team compiled a 4–6 record and was outscored 200 to 159. John Hanson and Mike Hood were team captains.

Cornell's 1–6 conference record tied for seventh place in the Ivy League standings. The Big Red were outscored 147 to 96 by Ivy opponents.

Cornell played its home games at Schoellkopf Field in Ithaca, New York.

== Schedule ==
Date	Opponent	Site	Result	Attendance	Source
September 19	at Princeton^{†}	Princeton Stadium; Princeton, NJ	L 0–6	27,800	
September 26	at Holy Cross*	Fitton Field; Worcester, MA	W 17–9	9,140	
October 3	Buffalo*	Schoellkopf Field; Ithaca, NY	W 34–31	7,692	
October 10	at Harvard	Harvard Stadium; Boston, MA	L 12–19	6,075	
October 17	Bucknell*	Schoellkopf Field; Ithaca, NY	W 23–19	13,188	
October 24	Dartmouth	Schoellkopf Field; Ithaca, NY (rivalry)	W 14–11	10,301	
October 31	Brown	Schoellkopf Field; Ithaca, NY	L 7–20	10,462	
November 7	at Yale	Yale Bowl; New Haven, CT	L 21–28	12,595	
November 14	at Columbia	Wien Stadium; New York, NY (rivalry)	L 10–22	6,845	
November 21	Penn	Schoellkopf Field; Ithaca, NY (rivalry)	L 21–35	4,633	
*Non-conference game; ^{†}Homecoming
