= 1998 Lehigh Mountain Hawks football team =

American college football season

1998 Lehigh Mountain Hawks football

Patriot League champion

NCAA Division I-AA Quarterfinal, L 21–27 at UMass
- Conference: Patriot League

Ranking
- Sports Network: No. 7
- Record: 12–1 (6–0 Patriot)
- Head coach: Kevin Higgins (5th season)
- Offensive coordinator: Andy Coen (3rd season)
- Defensive coordinator: Joe Bottiglieri (1st season)
- Captains: Deron Braswell; Sam Brinley; Nick Martucci; Jonathan Stiegler
- Home stadium: Goodman Stadium

1998 Patriot League football standings
	Conf.			Overall
Team	W		L	W		L
No. 7 Lehigh $^	6	–	0	12	–	1
No. 21 Colgate ^	5	–	1	8	–	4
Bucknell	3	–	3	6	–	5
Lafayette	3	–	3	3	–	8
Fordham	2	–	4	4	–	7
Towson	1	–	5	5	–	6
Holy Cross	1	–	5	2	–	9
$ – Conference champion; ^ – NCAA Division I-AA playoff participant; Rankings from The Sports Network poll

The 1998 Lehigh Mountain Hawks football team was an American football team that represented Lehigh University during the 1998 NCAA Division I-AA football season. Lehigh won its third Patriot League championship of the 1990s.

In their fifth year under head coach Kevin Higgins, the Mountain Hawks went undefeated (11–0) in the regular season, ending the year at 12–1 after losing in the second round of the national playoffs. Deron Braswell, Nick Martucci, Jonathan Stiegler and Sam Brinley were the team captains.

Including playoff games, the Mountain Hawks outscored opponents 396 to 189. Their 6–0 conference record topped the seven-team Patriot League standings.

Unranked at the start of the year, Lehigh's winning streak finally earned a spot in the national Division I-AA top 25 in the last week of October. In the ensuing weeks, the Hawks rose from No. 25 to reach No. 7 in the final poll.

Despite their conference championship and undefeated record, Lehigh did not host any playoff games. The Mountain Hawks defeated No. 10 Richmond and then lost to No. 1 UMass on the road.

Lehigh played its home games at Goodman Stadium on the university's Goodman Campus in Bethlehem, Pennsylvania.

== Schedule ==
Date	Opponent	Rank	Site	Result	Attendance	Source
September 12	Fordham		Goodman Stadium; Bethlehem, PA	W 31–6	7,538	
September 19	at Saint Mary's (CA)*		Saint Mary's Stadium; Moraga, CA	W 22–16	1,725	
September 26	Princeton*		Goodman Stadium; Bethlehem, PA	W 31–24	10,136	
October 3	at Harvard*		Harvard Stadium; Boston, MA	W 21–17	5,270	
October 10	at Columbia*		Wien Stadium; New York, NY	W 20–19	3,675	
October 17	Towson		Goodman Stadium; Bethlehem, PA	W 55–7	8,059	
October 24	at Holy Cross		Fitton Field; Worcester, MA	W 24–14	6,458	
October 31	Wofford*	No. 25	Goodman Stadium; Bethlehem, PA	W 26–0	12,147	
November 7	Colgate	No. 23	Goodman Stadium; Bethlehem, PA	W 41–22	13,432	
November 14	Bucknell	No. 20	Goodman Stadium; Bethlehem, PA	W 49–7	9,178	
November 21	at Lafayette	No. 17	Fisher Field; Easton, PA (The Rivalry)	W 31–7	13,158	
November 28	at No. 5 Richmond*	No. 13	City Stadium; Richmond, VA (NCAA Division I-AA First Round)	W 24–23	10,254	
December 5	at No. 12 UMass*	No. 13	McGuirk Stadium; Hadley, MA (NCAA Division I-AA Quarterfinal)	L 21–27	12,108	
*Non-conference game; Rankings from The Sports Network Poll released prior to the game
