= Fairfield Stags football =

Fairfield Stags
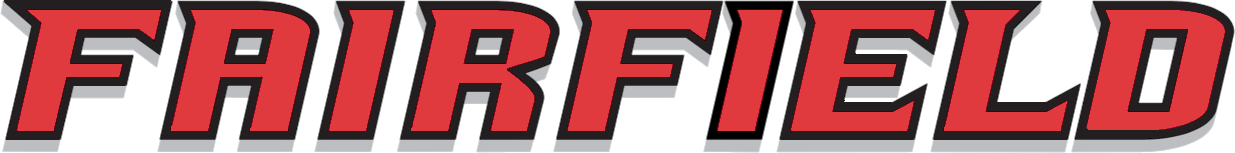
- First season: 1996; 30 years ago
- Last season: 2002; 24 years ago
- Location: Fairfield, Connecticut
- Stadium: Alumni Stadium
- NCAA division: Division I-AA
- Conference: Metro Atlantic Athletic Conference
- Colors: Red
- All-time record: 44–28–0 (.611)
- Bowl record: 0–0 (–)

National championships
- Claimed: 0

Conference championships
- 1 (1998)

Division championships
- 0
- Website: FairfieldStags.com

The Fairfield Stags football program were the intercollegiate American football team for Fairfield University located in Fairfield, Connecticut. The team competed in the NCAA Division I-AA and were members of the Metro Atlantic Athletic Conference. The school's first football team was fielded in 1996. Fairfield participated in football from 1996 to 2002, compiling an all-time record of 44–28. The Fairfield football program was discontinued at the conclusion of the 2002 season.

== Notable former players ==
Notable alumni include: Kevin Nealon, Steve Norcini, Alex Warr, “High School” Bob Hoey and David Strada. Ben McAdoo was an assistant coach during the 2002 (final) season.

== Year-by-year results ==
Conference champions	Division champions

Year	NCAA Division	Conference	Overall					Coach
Year	NCAA Division	Conference	Games	Win	Loss	Tie	Pct.	Coach
1996	I-AA	MAAC	9	1	8	0	.111	Kevin Kiesel
1997	I-AA	MAAC	10	7	3	0	.700	Kevin Kiesel
1998	I-AA	MAAC	11	9	2	0	.818	Kevin Kiesel
1999	I-AA	MAAC	11	9	2	0	.818	Kevin Kiesel
2000	I-AA	MAAC	10	8	2	0	.800	Kevin Kiesel
2001	I-AA	MAAC	10	5	5	0	.500	Joe Bernard
2002	I-AA	MAAC	11	5	6	0	.455	Joe Bernard
	Totals		72	44	28	0	.611	

== Championships ==
=== Conference championships ===
Year	Conference	Coach	Overall record	Conference record
1998	Metro Atlantic Athletic Conference (Co-Championship)	Kevin Kiesel	9–2	7–1
Total conference championships			1
