= 1998 Brown Bears football team =

American college football season

1998 Brown Bears football
- Conference: Ivy League
- Record: 7–3 (5–2 Ivy)
- Head coach: Phil Estes (1st season)
- Offensive scheme: Pro-style
- Defensive coordinator: David Duggan (1st season)
- Base defense: 4–3
- Captains: Sean Morey; Alex Pittz
- Home stadium: Brown Stadium

1998 Ivy League football standings
	Conf.			Overall
Team	W		L	W		L
Penn $	6	–	1	8	–	2
Brown	5	–	2	7	–	3
Yale	5	–	2	6	–	4
Princeton	4	–	3	5	–	5
Columbia	3	–	4	4	–	6
Harvard	3	–	4	4	–	6
Cornell	1	–	6	4	–	6
Dartmouth	1	–	6	2	–	8
$ – Conference champion

The 1998 Brown Bears football team was an American football team that represented Brown University during the 1998 NCAA Division I-AA football season. Brown tied for second in the Ivy League.

In their first season under head coach Phil Estes, the Bears compiled a 7–3 record and outscored opponents 265 to 241. Sean Morey and Alex Pittz were the team captains.

The Bears' 5–2 conference tied for second in the Ivy League standings. They outscored Ivy opponents 188 to 150.

Brown played its home games at Brown Stadium in Providence, Rhode Island.

== Schedule ==
Date	Opponent	Site	Result	Attendance	Source
September 19	Yale	Brown Stadium; Providence, RI	L 28–30	8,375	
September 26	at Lafayette*	Fisher Field; Easton, PA	W 23–21	7,359	
October 3	at Rhode Island*	Meade Stadium; Kingston, RI (rivalry)	L 16–44	7,214	
October 10	at Princeton	Princeton Stadium; Princeton, NJ	L 17–31	18,622	
October 17	Fordham*	Brown Stadium; Providence, RI	W 38–27	4,439	
October 24	Penn	Brown Stadium; Providence, RI	W 58–51	4,438	
October 31	at Cornell	Schoellkopf Field; Ithaca, NY	W 20–7	10,462	
November 7	at Harvard	Harvard Stadium; Boston, MA	W 27–6	8,067	
November 14	Dartmouth	Brown Stadium; Providence, RI	W 28–21	8,323	
November 21	at Columbia	Wien Stadium; New York, NY	W 10–3	4,600	
*Non-conference game
