= 1998 Penn Quakers football team =

American college football season

1998 Penn Quakers football

Ivy League champion
- Conference: Ivy League
- Record: 8–2 (6–1 Ivy)
- Head coach: Al Bagnoli (7th season)
- Defensive coordinator: Mike Toop (7th season)
- Captains: Jim Finn; Joe Piela
- Home stadium: Franklin Field

1998 Ivy League football standings
	Conf.			Overall
Team	W		L	W		L
Penn $	6	–	1	8	–	2
Brown	5	–	2	7	–	3
Yale	5	–	2	6	–	4
Princeton	4	–	3	5	–	5
Columbia	3	–	4	4	–	6
Harvard	3	–	4	4	–	6
Cornell	1	–	6	4	–	6
Dartmouth	1	–	6	2	–	8
$ – Conference champion

The 1998 Penn Quakers football team was an American football team that represented the University of Pennsylvania during the 1998 NCAA Division I-AA football season. A year after having to forfeit all of its Ivy League wins, Penn won the conference championship in 1998.

Penn played its home games at Franklin Field adjacent to the university's campus in Philadelphia, Pennsylvania.

== History ==
In its seventh year under head coach Al Bagnoli, the team compiled an 8–2 record and outscored opponents 297 to 212. Jim Finn and Joe Piela were the team captains.

Penn's 6–1 conference record topped the Ivy League standings. The Quakers outscored Ivy opponents 225 to 137 by Ivy opponents.

== Schedule ==
Date	Opponent	Site	Result	Attendance	Source
September 19	at Dartmouth	Memorial Field; Hanover, NH	W 17–14	8,519	
September 26	Richmond*	Franklin Field; Philadelphia, PA	L 18–34	5,309	
October 3	Bucknell*	Franklin Field; Philadelphia, PA	W 20–10	10,809	
October 10	at Fordham*	Coffey Field; Bronx, NY	W 34–31	3,424	
October 17	Columbia	Franklin Field; Philadelphia, PA	W 20–0	8,108	
October 24	at Brown	Brown Stadium; Providence, RI	L 51–58	4,438	
October 31	Yale	Franklin Field; Philadelphia, PA	W 34–21	20,875	
November 7	at Princeton	Princeton Stadium; Princeton, NJ (rivalry)	W 27–14	20,230	
November 14	Harvard	Franklin Field; Philadelphia, PA (rivalry)	W 41–10	14,909	
November 21	at Cornell	Schoellkopf Field; Ithaca, NY (rivalry)	W 35–21	4,633	
*Non-conference game

== Roster ==
1998 Penn Quakers football team roster
Players			Coaches
Offense: Pos. / # / Name / Class; FB / 7 / Jim Finn / Sr	Defense: Pos. / # / Name / Class	Special teams: Pos. / # / Name / Class	Head coach: Al Bagnoli; Coordinators/assistant coaches Legend: (C) Team captain; (S) Suspended; (I) Ineligible; Injured; Redshirt
