= Ken O'Keefe =

American football player and coach (born 1953)

Biographical details
- Born: August 18, 1953 (age 73); Milford, Connecticut, U.S.

Playing career
- 1972–1974: John Carroll
- Position: Wide receiver

Coaching career (HC unless noted)
- 1976–1977: New Haven (assistant)
- 1978–1984: Worcester Academy (MA)
- 1985: Fort Worth Country Day (TX)
- 1986–1989: Allegheny (OC)
- 1990–1997: Allegheny
- 1998: Fordham
- 1999–2011: Iowa (OC/QB)
- 2012–2015: Miami Dolphins (WR)
- 2016: Miami Dolphins (senior analyst)
- 2017–2021: Iowa (QB)

Head coaching record
- Overall: 83–17–1 (college)
- Tournaments: 5–5 (NCAA D-III playoffs)

Accomplishments and honors

Championships
- 1 NCAA Division III (1990); 6 NCAC (1990–1991, 1993–1994, 1996–1997)

Awards
- AFCA Division III Coach of the Year (1990); 4x NCAC Coach of the Year

Ken O'Keefe (born August 18, 1953) is an American football coach and former player. He most recently served as the quarterbacks coach for the Iowa Hawkeyes football team, a position he held from January 2017 through February 2022. O'Keefe served as the offensive coordinator for the Iowa Hawkeyes football team from 1999 to 2011. He was the head football coach at the Allegheny College from 1990 to 1997 and at Fordham University in 1998, compiling a career college football record of 83–17–1. In O'Keefe's first season at Allegheny, in 1990, his team went 13–0–1 and won the NCAA Division III Football Championship.

== Coaching career ==
While coaching at Allegheny College, O'Keefe created an exchange program between Russian and American middle school football players. In recognition, he received the Dodge Award for language advocacy from the Northeast Conference on the Teaching of Foreign Languages in 1998.

On February 3, 2012, O'Keefe resigned from the Iowa program to take a job with the Miami Dolphins of the National Football League (NFL). Former Dolphins head coach Joe Philbin spent several years on Iowa's staff, coaching the offensive line from 1999 to 2002. O'Keefe returned to Iowa prior to the 2017 season as its quarterbacks coach. He stepped down from his role after the 2021 season, taking an off-field role in the program.

== Head coaching record ==
Year	Team	Overall	Conference	Standing	Bowl/playoffs
Allegheny Gators (North Coast Athletic Conference) (1990–1997)
1990	Allegheny	13–0–1	7–0	1st	W NCAA Division III Championship
1991	Allegheny	11–1	7–0	1st	L NCAA Division III Quarterfinal
1992	Allegheny	8–2	7–1	2nd	
1993	Allegheny	9–2	8–0	1st	L NCAA Division III First Round
1994	Allegheny	10–1	8–0	1st	L NCAA Division III First Round
1995	Allegheny	9–1	7–1	2nd	
1996	Allegheny	10–1	8–0	1st	L NCAA Division III First Round
1997	Allegheny	9–2	7–1	T–1st	L NCAA Division III First Round
Allegheny:		79–10–1	59–3		
Fordham Rams (Patriot League) (1998)
1998	Fordham	4–7	2–4	5th	
Fordham:		4–7	2–4		
Total:		83–17–1			
National championship Conference title Conference division title or championship game berth
