= 1998 Holy Cross Crusaders football team =

American college football season

1998 Holy Cross Crusaders football
- Conference: Patriot League
- Record: 2–9 (1–5 Patriot)
- Head coach: Dan Allen (3rd season)
- Offensive coordinator: Vinny Marino (1st season)
- Defensive coordinator: Tom Quinn (3rd season)
- Captains: John Aloisi; Bob Andrews; Joel Beck; Barrett Doxsey
- Home stadium: Fitton Field

1998 Patriot League football standings
	Conf.			Overall
Team	W		L	W		L
No. 7 Lehigh $^	6	–	0	12	–	1
No. 21 Colgate ^	5	–	1	8	–	4
Bucknell	3	–	3	6	–	5
Lafayette	3	–	3	3	–	8
Fordham	2	–	4	4	–	7
Towson	1	–	5	5	–	6
Holy Cross	1	–	5	2	–	9
$ – Conference champion; ^ – NCAA Division I-AA playoff participant; Rankings from The Sports Network poll

The 1998 Holy Cross Crusaders football team was an American football team that represented the College of the Holy Cross during the 1998 NCAA Division I-AA football season. Holy Cross tied for last in the Patriot League.

In their third year under head coach Dan Allen, the Crusaders compiled a 2–9 record. Bob Andrews, John Aloisi, Joel Beck and Barrett Doxsey were the team captains.

The Crusaders were outscored 234 to 168. Their 1–5 conference record tied for sixth (and worst) in the seven-team Patriot League standings.

Holy Cross played its home games at Fitton Field on the college campus in Worcester, Massachusetts.

== Schedule ==
Date	Opponent	Site	Result	Attendance	Source
September 5	Fairfield*	Fitton Field; Worcester, MA	W 26–22	5,216	
September 19	at Georgetown*	Kehoe Field; Washington, DC	L 12–13	2,756	
September 26	Cornell^{†}*	Fitton Field; Worcester, MA	L 9–17	9,140	
October 3	Towson	Fitton Field; Worcester, MA	W 31–24	4,150	
October 10	at Yale*	Yale Bowl; New Haven, CT	L 7–15	3,750	
October 17	at Harvard*	Harvard Stadium; Boston, MA	L 14–20 ^{OT}	5,574	
October 24	Lehigh	Fitton Field; Worcester, MA	L 14–24	6,458	
October 31	at Lafayette	Fisher Field; Easton, PA	L 17–28	3,842	
November 7	Bucknell^	Fitton Field; Worcester, MA	L 14–30	8,125	
November 14	Fordham	Fitton Field; Worcester, MA (rivalry)	L 10–13	5,189	
November 21	at Colgate	Andy Kerr Stadium; Hamilton, NY	L 14–28	3,021	
*Non-conference game; ^{†}Homecoming; ^ Family Weekend
