= 1998 Towson Tigers football team =

American college football season

1998 Towson Tigers football
- Conference: Patriot League
- Record: 5–6 (1–5 Patriot)
- Head coach: Gordy Combs (7th season)
- Home stadium: Minnegan Stadium

1998 Patriot League football standings
	Conf.			Overall
Team	W		L	W		L
No. 7 Lehigh $^	6	–	0	12	–	1
No. 21 Colgate ^	5	–	1	8	–	4
Bucknell	3	–	3	6	–	5
Lafayette	3	–	3	3	–	8
Fordham	2	–	4	4	–	7
Towson	1	–	5	5	–	6
Holy Cross	1	–	5	2	–	9
$ – Conference champion; ^ – NCAA Division I-AA playoff participant; Rankings from The Sports Network poll

The 1998 Towson Tigers football team was an American football team that represented Towson University during the 1998 NCAA Division I-AA football season. Towson tied for last in the Patriot League.

In their seventh year under head coach Gordy Combs, the Tigers compiled a 5–6 record.

The Tigers were outscored 336 to 243. Their 1–5 conference record tied for sixth (and worst) in the seven-team Patriot League standings.

Towson played its home games at Minnegan Stadium on the university campus in Towson, Maryland.

== Schedule ==
Date	Opponent	Site	Result	Attendance	Source
September 3	Morgan State*	Minnegan Stadium; Towson, MD	W 15–10	8,056	
September 12	at Monmouth*	Kessler Field; West Long Branch, NJ	W 42–20	2,766	
September 19	at Colgate	Minnegan Stadium; Towson, MD	L 14–35	2,012	
September 26	Fordham	Minnegan Stadium; Towson, MD	W 35–34 ^{OT}	2,274	
October 3	at Holy Cross	Fitton Field; Worcester, MA	L 24–31	4,150	
October 10	Lafayette	Minnegan Stadium; Towson, MD	L 7–27	3,468	
October 17	at Lehigh	Goodman Stadium; Bethlehem, PA	L 7–55	8,059	
October 31	Saint Mary's (CA)*	Minnegan Stadium; Towson, MD	W 27–21	2,009	
November 7	at Dayton*	Welcome Stadium; Dayton, OH	L 42–43	8,802	
November 14	Drake*	Minnegan Stadium; Towson, MD	W 17–14		
November 21	at Bucknell	Christy Mathewson–Memorial Stadium; Lewisburg, PA	L 13–46	2,423	
*Non-conference game
