= Marc Brown (American football) =

American football player (born 1961)

No. 86
- Position: Wide receiver

Personal information
- Born: May 7, 1961 (age 65); Nyack, New York, U.S.

Career information
- High school: Nyack
- College: Towson
- NFL draft: 1983: undrafted

Career history
- Washington Federals (1983); Philadelphia Eagles (1983)*; Buffalo Bills (1987)
- * Offseason or practice squad member only

Career NFL statistics
- Games played: 3
- Receptions: 9
- Receiving yards: 120
- Stats at Pro Football Reference

Marc Stacy Brown (born May 7, 1961) is an American former professional football player who was a wide receiver for the Buffalo Bills of the National Football League (NFL) in 1987. He played college football for the Towson State Tigers.

Brown attended Nyack High School, Towson State University. While at WCC, he was named the team's player of the year and to the all-state junior college team. He graduated from Towson with a degree in communications in 1983.

He signed with the Washington Federals of the United States Football League in January 1983, but was released in April after playing in three games. He was later signed by the National Football League's Philadelphia Eagles for one month in 1983, and also signed with the USFL's Philadelphia Stars. He signed with the Buffalo Bills in December 1986, but was waived in July 1987.

Brown returned to the Bills in September during the 1987 National Football League Players Association strike as a replacement player. Brown played in three regular season games for Buffalo, scoring the Bills' only touchdown in a 47–6 loss to the Indianapolis Colts on October 4.
