= 1998 Lafayette Leopards football team =

American college football season

1998 Lafayette Leopards football
- Conference: Patriot League
- Record: 3–8 (3–3 Patriot)
- Head coach: Bill Russo (18th season)
- Captains: Angel Colon; Damian Wroblewski; Andy Zabinski
- Home stadium: Fisher Field

1998 Patriot League football standings
	Conf.			Overall
Team	W		L	W		L
No. 7 Lehigh $^	6	–	0	12	–	1
No. 21 Colgate ^	5	–	1	8	–	4
Bucknell	3	–	3	6	–	5
Lafayette	3	–	3	3	–	8
Fordham	2	–	4	4	–	7
Towson	1	–	5	5	–	6
Holy Cross	1	–	5	2	–	9
$ – Conference champion; ^ – NCAA Division I-AA playoff participant; Rankings from The Sports Network poll

The 1998 Lafayette Leopards football team was an American football team that represented Lafayette College during the 1998 NCAA Division I-AA football season. The Leopards tied for third in the Patriot League.

In their 18th year under head coach Bill Russo, the Leopards compiled a 3–8 record. Angel Colon, Damian Wroblewski and Andy Zabinski were the team captains.

The Leopards were outscored 271 to 190. Their 3–3 conference record tied for third place in the seven-team Patriot League standings.

Lafayette played its home games at Fisher Field on College Hill in Easton, Pennsylvania.

== Schedule ==
Date	Opponent	Site	Result	Attendance	Source
September 12	at Northeastern*	Parsons Field; Brookline, MA	L 7–41	2,262	
September 19	Buffalo*	Fisher Field; Easton, PA	L 14–16	3,834	
September 26	Brown*	Fisher Field; Easton, PA	L 21–23	7,359	
October 3	at Dartmouth*	Memorial Field; Hanover, NH	L 10–13 ^{OT}	5,903	
October 10	at Towson	Minnegan Stadium; Towson, MD	W 27–7	3,468	
October 17	Princeton^{†}*	Fisher Field; Easton, PA	L 0–28	8,039	
October 24	at Bucknell	Christy Mathewson–Memorial Stadium; Lewisburg, PA	L 22–33	8,500	
October 31	Holy Cross	Fisher Field; Easton, PA	W 28–17	3,842	
November 7	at Fordham	Coffey Field; Bronx, NY	W 27–20	1,711	
November 14	at Colgate	Andy Kerr Stadium; Hamilton, NY	L 27–42	3,006	
November 21	No. 17 Lehigh	Fisher Field; Easton, PA (The Rivalry)	L 7–31	13,158	
*Non-conference game; ^{†}Homecoming; Rankings from The Sports Network Poll released prior to the game
