= Kevin Kiesel =

American football player and coach (born 1959)

Biographical details
- Born: July 6, 1959 (age 67); Scranton, Pennsylvania, U.S.

Playing career
- 1977–1980: Gettysburg

Coaching career (HC unless noted)
- 1981–1982: West Chester (assistant)
- 1983: Kentucky (assistant)
- 1984: Gettysburg (assistant)
- 1985: Temple (assistant)
- 1986–1990: Fordham (OC)
- 1991–1992: Navy (ST)
- 1993–1995: Albright
- 1996–2000: Fairfield
- 2001–2004: Millersville
- 2005–2010: Guilford

Head coaching record
- Overall: 88–93–1

Accomplishments and honors

Championships
- 1 MAAC (1998)

Awards
- MAAC Coach of the Year (1998)

Kevin Robert Kiesel (born July 5, 1959) is an American former college football coach.

== Head coaching record ==
Year	Team	Overall	Conference	Standing	Bowl/playoffs
Albright Lions (Middle Atlantic Conference) (1993–1995)
1993	Albright	3–6	1–4	T–5th (Commonwealth)	
1994	Albright	3–5–1	2–3	T–4th (Commonwealth)	
1995	Albright	8–3	4–1	2nd (Commonwealth)	W ECAC D-III Southwest Championship
Albright:		14–14–1	7–8		
Fairfield Stags (Metro Atlantic Athletic Conference) (1996–2000)
1996	Fairfield	1–8	1–7	T–8th	
1997	Fairfield	7–3	4–3	T–3rd	
1998	Fairfield	9–2	7–1	T–1st	
1999	Fairfield	9–2	7–1	NA	
2000	Fairfield	8–2	7–1	2nd	
Fairfield:		33–17	27–13		
Millersville Marauders (Pennsylvania State Athletic Conference) (2001–2004)
2001	Millersville	3–8	2–4	5th (Eastern)	
2002	Millersville	3–7	3–3	4th (Eastern)	
2003	Millersville	4–7	1–5	6th (Eastern)	
2004	Millersville	5–5	3–3	4th (Eastern)	
Millersville:		15–27	9–15		
Guilford Quakers (Old Dominion Athletic Conference) (2005–2010)
2005	Guilford	5–5	4–2	T–2nd	
2006	Guilford	6–4	3–3	5th	
2007	Guilford	6–4	2–4	5th	
2008	Guilford	4–6	1–5	T–6th	
2009	Guilford	4–6	2–4	T–5th	
2010	Guilford	0–10	0–6	7th	
Guilford:		25–35	12–24		
Total:		88–93–1			
National championship Conference title Conference division title or championship game berth
