= Gordy Combs =

American football coach (born 1950)

Biographical details
- Born: April 3, 1950

Coaching career (HC unless noted)
- 1973–1991: Towson State (assistant)
- 1992–2008: Towson State / Towson
- 2009–2013: Johns Hopkins (OLB)

Head coaching record
- Overall: 91–91

Gordy Combs (born April 3, 1950) is a former American college football coach. He was the head coach of the Towson Tigers football team from 1992 through 2008. He had spent 19 seasons as an assistant coach to Phil Albert at Towson before taking over when Albert retired. Combs was replaced in 2009 by Rob Ambrose. He spent the next four years as a defensive assistant at nearby Johns Hopkins University. He helped the team to the postseason all four years he was there. He retired after 2013 season.

== Head coaching record ==
Year	Team	Overall	Conference	Standing	Bowl/playoffs	TSN^{#}
Towson State Tigers (NCAA Division I-AA independent) (1992–1996)
1992	Towson State	5–5				
1993	Towson State	8–2				24
1994	Towson State	8–2				
1995	Towson State	6–5				
1996	Towson State	6–4				
Towson Tigers (Patriot League) (1997–2003)
1997	Towson	2–8	0–6	7th		
1998	Towson	5–6	1–5	T–6th		
1999	Towson	7–4	4–2	3rd		
2000	Towson	7–4	3–3	4th		
2001	Towson	3–7	2–5	6th		
2002	Towson	6–5	3–4	5th		
2003	Towson	6–6	3–4	5th		
Towson Tigers (Atlantic 10 Conference) (2004–2006)
2004	Towson	3–8	0–8	12th		
2005	Towson	6–6	3–5	T–3rd (South)		
2006	Towson	7–4	4–4	3rd (South)		
Towson Tigers (Colonial Athletic Association) (2007–2008)
2007	Towson	3–8	1–7	6th (South)		
2008	Towson	3–9	1–7	6th (South)		
Towson State / Towson:		91–91	25–60			
Total:		91–91				
