= Jeff Filkovski =

American football player and coach (born 1967)

Current position
- Title: Head coach
- Team: North Carolina Wesleyan
- Conference: USA South
- Record: 50–73

Biographical details
- Born: December 16, 1967 (age 58); Penn, Pennsylvania, U.S.

Playing career
- 1987–1990: Allegheny
- Position: Quarterback

Coaching career (HC unless noted)
- 1992–1995: Holy Cross (assistant)
- 1996–2003: Cincinnati (assistant)
- 2006: Thomas More (QB)
- 2007: Cologne Centurions (OC/QB)
- 2007: Heidelberg (OC/QB)
- 2008–2012: Marietta
- 2013–present: North Carolina Wesleyan

Head coaching record
- Overall: 60–113

Jeffery S. Filkovski (born December 16, 1967) is an American football coach and former player. He is the head football coach for North Carolina Wesleyan University, a position he has held since 2013. He previously served in the same capacity at Marietta College from 2008 to 2012, compiling a record of 10–40. Filkovski played football as a quarterback at Allegheny College, leading the team to the NCAA Division III Football Championship in 1990, while rocking a mullet.

== Coaching career ==
Filkovski was named the 28th head football coach at Marietta College on March 13, 2008. He spent five years at the helm of the program, leading the Pioneers to an overall record of 10–40 during his tenure. After going winless during the 2012 season, Filkovski resigned on November 14.

== Head coaching record ==
| Year | Team | Overall | Conference | Standing | Bowl/playoffs |
|---|---|---|---|---|---|
Marietta Pioneers (Ohio Athletic Conference) (2008–2012)
| 2008 | Marietta | 2–8 | 1–8 | 10th | |
| 2009 | Marietta | 3–7 | 2–7 | 9th | |
| 2010 | Marietta | 2–8 | 1–8 | 9th | |
| 2011 | Marietta | 3–7 | 2–7 | T–8th | |
| 2012 | Marietta | 0–10 | 0–9 | 10th | |
| Marietta: | | 10–40 | 6–39 | | |
North Carolina Wesleyan Battling Bishops (USA South Athletic Conference) (2013–present)
| 2013 | North Carolina Wesleyan | 2–8 | 2–5 | T–6th | |
| 2014 | North Carolina Wesleyan | 5–5 | 4–4 | 5th | |
| 2015 | North Carolina Wesleyan | 5–5 | 5–2 | T–2nd | |
| 2016 | North Carolina Wesleyan | 5–4 | 4–2 | 3rd | |
| 2017 | North Carolina Wesleyan | 3–7 | 3–4 | T–4th | |
| 2018 | North Carolina Wesleyan | 5–4 | 4–3 | T–3rd | |
| 2019 | North Carolina Wesleyan | 6–4 | 5–2 | T–2nd | |
| 2020–21 | North Carolina Wesleyan | 0–5 | 0–2 | T–6th | |
| 2021 | North Carolina Wesleyan | 4–6 | 4–4 | T–4th | |
| 2022 | North Carolina Wesleyan | 3–7 | 3–4 | 6th | |
| 2023 | North Carolina Wesleyan | 4–6 | 4–3 | 5th | |
| 2024 | North Carolina Wesleyan | 4–6 | 4–4 | 6th | |
| 2025 | North Carolina Wesleyan | 4–6 | 2–5 | T–6th | |
| 2026 | North Carolina Wesleyan | 0–0 | 0–0 | | |
| North Carolina Wesleyan: | | 50–73 | 44–44 | | |
| Total: | | 60–113 | | | |
