= John Marzka =

American football coach (born c. 1968)

Current position
- Title: Offensive coordinator & quarterbacks coach
- Team: Buffalo State
- Conference: Liberty

Biographical details
- Born: c. 1968 (age 57–58); Erie, Pennsylvania, U.S.
- Education: Allegheny College (1991)

Playing career
- 1987–1990: Allegheny
- Position: Center

Coaching career (HC unless noted)
- 1991: Erie Academy (PA) (OL/DL)
- 1992–1993: Allegheny (DL)
- 1994–1995: Allegheny (OL/TE)
- 1996–1997: Allegheny (OC/OL/TE)
- 1998: Fordham (OC/OL/TE)
- 2001–2006: Thiel (AHC/OC/QB)
- 2007–2021: Albright
- 2022: Milford Academy (NY) (AHC/OC/QB/RB/WR/TE)
- 2023–2025: USMAPS (NY)
- 2026–present: Buffalo State (OC/QB)

Head coaching record
- Overall: 88–64 (college)
- Bowls: 4–4
- Tournaments: 3–2 (NCAA D-III playoffs)

Accomplishments and honors

Championships
- 2 MAC (2008, 2015)

Awards
- 2× First-Team All-NCAC (1989–1990); MAC Coach of the Year (2015); Allegheny Hall of Fame (2015)

John Marzka (born c. 1968) is an American college football coach. He is the offensive coordinator and quarterbacks coach for Buffalo State University, positions he has held since 2026. Before that, he served as the head football coach for the United States Military Academy Preparatory School, a position he held from 2023 to 2025. He was the head football coach for Albright College from 2007 to 2021. He also coached for Erie Academy, Allegheny, Fordham, Thiel, and Milford Academy. He played college football for Allegheny as a center and won the 1990 NCAA Division III Football Championship.

In 2015, Marzka was inducted into the Allegheny College Hall of Fame.

== Head coaching record ==
=== College ===
Year	Team	Overall	Conference	Standing	Bowl/playoffs	D3^{#}
Albright Lions (Middle Atlantic Conference) (2007–2021)
2007	Albright	7–4	5–2	T–2nd	L South Atlantic	
2008	Albright	8–3	5–2	T–1st	W South Central	
2009	Albright	11–2	6–1	2nd	L NCAA Division III Quarterfinal	15
2010	Albright	5–5	3–4	6th		
2011	Albright	6–5	4–4	T–5th	L Southeast	
2012	Albright	8–3	6–3	4th	W Southeast	
2013	Albright	8–3	6–3	T–3rd	W Southwest	
2014	Albright	6–5	5–4	5th	L South Atlantic	
2015	Albright	10–2	8–1	1st	L NCAA Division III Second Round	17
2016	Albright	8–3	7–2	T–2nd	W MAC-Centennial	
2017	Albright	8–3	7–2	T–2nd	L MAC-Centennial	
2018	Albright	0–10	0–8	T–10th		
2019	Albright	2–8	2–6	T–9th		
2020–21	No team—COVID-19					
2021	Albright	2–8	1–7	10th		
Albright:		88–64	65–49			
Total:		88–64				
National championship Conference title Conference division title or championship game berth
