= Jack Leipheimer =

American football coach (born c. 1951)

Biographical details
- Born: c. 1951 (age 74–75)
- Education: Thiel College (1974)

Playing career
- 1970–1973: Thiel
- Position: Tight end

Coaching career (HC unless noted)
- 1975: Bullis School (MD) (OC)
- 1976–1978: Trinity HS (OH) (DC)
- 1979–1984: Kennedy Christian HS (PA)
- 1985–1988: Allegheny (assistant)
- 1989–2000: Allegheny (DC)
- 2001–2008: Thiel
- 2019–2020: Thiel (Defensive assistant)
- 2021: Thiel (co-DC/LB)

Administrative career (AD unless noted)
- 2008–2015: Thiel

Head coaching record
- Overall: 36–46 (college)
- Tournaments: 1–1 (NCAA D-III playoffs)

Accomplishments and honors

Championships
- 1 PAC (2005)

Jack Leipheimer (born c. 1951) is an American former college football coach. He was the head football coach for Kennedy Christian High School—now known as Kennedy Catholic High School—from 1979 to 1984 and Thiel College from 2001 to 2008. He also coached for Bullis School, Trinity High School, and Allegheny. He played college football for Thiel as a tight end.

From 2008 to 2015, Leipheimer was the athletic director for Thiel College.

== Head coaching record ==
=== College ===
Year	Team	Overall	Conference	Standing	Bowl/playoffs	D3^{#}
Thiel Tomcats (Presidents' Athletic Conference) (2001–2008)
2001	Thiel	2–8	1–3	T–4th		
2002	Thiel	3–7	2–3	T–3rd		
2003	Thiel	3–7	1–4	5th		
2004	Thiel	7–3	4–1	2nd		
2005	Thiel	11–1	6–0	1st	L NCAA Division III Second Round	17
2006	Thiel	5–5	4–2	3rd		
2007	Thiel	3–7	1–5	7th		
2008	Thiel	2–8	1–5	T–6th		
Thiel:		36–46	20–23			
Total:		36–46				
National championship Conference title Conference division title or championship game berth
