= Towson Tigers football =

American football team representing Towson University

2026 Towson Tigers football team
- First season: 1969; 57 years ago
- Athletic director: Tim Leonard
- Head coach: Pete Shinnick; 3rd season, 18–17 (.514)
- Location: Towson, Maryland
- Stadium: Johnny Unitas Stadium (capacity: 11,198)
- Field: Minnegan Field
- NCAA division: Division I FCS
- Conference: CAA Football
- Colors: Black and gold
- All-time record: 314–289–4 (.521)

Conference championships
- CAA: 2011, 2012
- Rivalries: Morgan State (rivalry)
- Fight song: "Hail Towson"
- Mascot: Doc
- Marching band: The World Famous Towson Tiger Marching Band
- Outfitter: Under Armour
- Website: towsontigers.com

The Towson Tigers football team represents Towson University in the sport of American football. The Tigers compete in the NCAA Division I Football Championship Subdivision (FCS) as a member of the Coastal Athletic Association (CAA). The Tigers are currently coached by Pete Shinnick. Their home games are played at Johnny Unitas Stadium in Towson, Maryland.

== History ==
Towson University has had four head coaches since the program began in 1969 and has competed at three levels of NCAA Football: Division III (1969–1978), Division II (1979–1986), and Division I-AA (FCS) (1987–present). The Tigers have qualified for post-season play at each level.

=== Division III (1969–1978) ===
The Towson Tigers football program debuted in 1969 with Carl Runk as the first-ever head coach. The first Tiger team posted a 4–4–1 record. The first program win came against Frostburg State University in a 53–16 blowout victory. In only the second season of Tiger football in 1970, the program posted its first winning season at 6–2.

After a dismal 1–8 record in 1971 and Carl Runk's resignation, Phil Albert became the new Tiger head coach for the 1972 season. Albert's first season was unsuccessful as the Tigers went 1–9; however, the Towson team would follow this season with 14 consecutive non-losing seasons under Albert's leadership. In 1974, the Towson Tigers went 10–0 in the programs only unbeaten season. Towson's first All-American player came the following year when QB Dan Dullea led the team to a 6–4 record. The 1976 season saw the program's first playoff berth after posting an 8–2 record. Towson beat C.W. Post (14–10) and St. Lawrence (38–36) on their way to the NCAA Division III Championship game. In the Stagg Bowl, Towson trailed St. John's of Minnesota 28–0 until quarterback Dan Dullea rallied the team to tie 28–28 with a minute left. Eventually St. John's won with a 19-yard field goal with only seconds remaining. The final score was 31–28.

The 1978 season was the final season that the Tigers played in Division III and the first season that the Tigers played in Towson Stadium. The new lighted 5,000-seat facility was christened with a 38–6 win over Mansfield before a crowd of 4,126 fans. Towson's Division III tenure would end on a positive note, as the Tigers finished the season with a 7–3 record. The Tigers ended their run in Division III with a record of 54–42–2.

=== Division II (1979–1986) ===
The Tigers' debut Division II game was against crosstown rival Morgan State. The Bears won 34–7 in front of an over capacity crowd of 6,311. The following week, the Tigers upset Division I-AA Maine by a score of 13–7. This would be the start of a nine-game winning streak that would leave the Tigers with a 9–1 record on the season.

The 1982 season saw the Tigers establishing themselves as a Division II power in the East. With quarterback Joe Anderson at the helm, the school ran a high powered passing game that lead to a 7–4 season, including the school's first wins over Morgan State and Bucknell.

The 1983 season saw a stellar defense that only allowed 5.8 points per game, a stat that led all Division II teams. The Tigers went 10–1 which earned them their first playoff bid in Division II. In their first Division II playoff game, the Tigers would lose to the eventual national champion North Dakota State Bison in Fargo, ND. The team was honored as the ECAC Division II Team of the Year while also winning the Lambert Award as the top Division II team in the East. Coach Albert was named as Kodak Region 3 "Coach of the Year".

The 1984 season saw similar success, with the team fighting to a 7–0 start to the season. The year ended with an 8–3 record with two of the losses coming from Division I-AA opponents. In the Tigers second Division II playoff appearance, the team beat Norfolk State 31–21 in the first round. In the semi-final, the Tigers would lose to the eventual national champions for the second straight year, falling 45–3 to Troy.

The Tigers opened 1985 with the 100th victory in school history, a 28–10 win over Shepherd. The Tigers also extended their regular season winning streak against Division II teams to 20 until a tie with Indiana (Pa.) 21–21. Despite finishing the season at 7–2–1 and not earning a playoff berth, the team managed to end the season ranked No. 10 in the nation.

The 1986 season was then Towson's last season that they would play in Division II. After finishing the regular season at 8–3–1, the Tigers would make the playoffs for the third time in four years. Their year and time in Division II would end with a 31–0 loss to Central State (OH) in the first round.

=== Division I-AA (FCS) (1987–present) ===
==== Under Phil Albert (1987–1991) ====
In their third game as an NCAA Division I-AA program, the Tigers made their presence known with their first I-AA win, a 17–14 victory at No. 4 Maine. The Tigers also stunned Howard University with a 30–14 victory, which would be the Bison's only loss of the year.

Their first Division I-AA season also provided a showcase for the talents of tailback David Meggett. A transfer from Morgan State where he played defensive back, he was switched to tailback at Towson. In 1987, Meggett scored a school record 16 touchdowns and led Division I-AA in all-purpose yardage, averaging 199 yards per game.

In 1988, the Tigers showed improvement against a rugged schedule, finishing with a 5–5 record as Meggett continued to make headlines. In the season opener, he scored four touchdowns, including a 100-yard kickoff return for a TD, in a 45–34 win over Northeastern. Later in the season, he rushed for a school record 220 yards in a win over New Haven. He finished his career as the most decorated player in Towson football history, winning the Walter Payton Award as the top player in NCAA Division I-AA. He also earned a spot on several All-American teams. Meggett also became the first Tiger to play in the Senior Bowl and was named as the Most Valuable Player for the North squad. A fifth round draft pick by the New York Giants, he became an All-Pro player in the NFL and helped the Giants win Super Bowl XXV.

In 1989, the Tigers struggled in Division I-AA. Despite terrific individual performances from All-Americans Rodney Smith and Mike Smith, the Tigers were only 2–8 on the year, their worst record since 1972. In 1990, the Tigers continued to struggle with a 2–9 record.

In 1991, the Tigers finished with a 1–10 record, losing 10 games for the first time. Their 13–7 win over Howard was Albert's final victory as the Tiger coach. He resigned after leading Towson to a 117–91–3 mark in 20 years.

==== Under Gordy Combs (1992–2008) ====
The Tigers opened the 1992 season with a new coach as long-time assistant Gordy Combs inherited Albert's position. In their first season under their new head coach, the Tigers showed resiliency as they posted several thrilling come-from-behind wins in a 5–5 season. In October, the Tigers rallied from a 33–14 deficit with eight minutes left for a 35–33 win at Indiana of Pa. They also posted a 33–32 win over Northeastern, scoring on the game's final play. Running back Tony Vinson, a transfer from Purdue, made his debut and in 1992 and rushed for more than 1,000 yards in just eight games.

In 1993, the Tigers became Division I-AA playoff contenders for the first time. With 27 seniors on the roster, the Tigers celebrated their 25th anniversary season in victorious style. Towson posted an 8–2 record and broke or tied 46 school records.

Vinson led the Tigers to a 32–30 win at nationally ranked Delaware by scoring his fourth TD of the game with ten seconds left. He set 15 Towson records and 11 NCAA records. In a win over Bucknell, Vinson ran for 364 yards, a Division I-AA record. His 2,016 yards on the year set another Division I-AA record as the All-American won the “Triple Crown,” leading the nation in rushing, scoring and all-purpose yards. The second Tiger to play in the Senior Bowl, he was a fifth round draft pick by the San Diego Chargers.

The 1994 season was almost a carbon copy of 1993 as Towson went 8-2 and broke 36 records. Quarterback Dan Crowley and wide receiver Mark Orlando combined to form one of the top passing combinations ever to play at Towson. Orlando was a first team All-American in 1994. He caught a career record 178 passes for a record 3,460 yards and 31 TD's. Crowley finished his career by setting school records with 8,900 yards passing and 81 TD passes.

After the 1994 season, football would change direction and started playing non-scholarship football. In 1995, the Tigers posted a 6–4 record competing in the ECAC-IFC.

In 1996, the biggest news came off the field. It was announced the Tigers would join the non-scholarship Patriot League for the 1997 season, providing the program with an emotional lift and an exciting conference affiliation. On the field, the Tigers recorded their fourth straight winning season. They won the final four games of the year to post a 6–4 record. Highlighting the season was a 33–32 triple overtime win at Marist, a game in which quarterback Kevin Smith passed for a school record 471 yards.

Towson's first Patriot League season was a rough one as the Tigers went 2–8 with their only two wins coming in non-league games. Defensive backs Khalid McLeod and Jabari Garrett were both named first team All-Patriot League.

In 1998, Towson's 30th season of football, the Tigers showed signs of improvement. The Tigers got off to a 2–0 start, beating rival Morgan State in the opener. They also claimed their first Patriot League win, beating Fordham in overtime. After a midseason slump against the league's heavyweights, the Tigers beat St. Mary's and Drake. Garrett was a first team All-Patriot League pick at defensive back for a second straight year. Jason Corle led the league in rushing, scoring and all-purpose yards, earning second team all-league honors.

The Tigers posted a second straight 7–4 record in 2000. Tailback Noah Read led the Patriot League in rushing with 1,422 yards, the second highest single season total by a Tiger. He rushed for over 100 yards in 10 of the 11 games. Meanwhile, Hollingsworth enjoyed a tremendous season at defensive end. Although sidelined for most of the last three games with an ankle injury, he led the nation with 18 sacks. Towson's first consensus first team All-American, he was named Defensive Player of the Year and Player of the Year by the Patriot League.

In 2001, the Tigers struggled offensively due to an unsettled situation at quarterback. On their way to a 3–7 record, the Tigers started three different signal-callers. Defensive back Sporty Evans was the only first team All-Patriot League selection.

Once again, the Tiger football program was on the move. Prior to the start of the 2002 season, it was announced that Towson would be joining the Atlantic-10 Football Conference as the conference's 12th member. The move would be effective for the 2004 season.

The Tigers were in the process of having a great year in 2002 when the injury bug hit, derailing the offense and turning an impressive 5–2 start into a very disappointing 1–3 finish. By the eighth game, the Tigers had lost 60 percent of their starting offensive line to season-ending injuries. The Tigers’ 5–2 start included a first-ever win over Lehigh and a big road victory at Holy Cross. The season finale marked the end of White's record-breaking career. White closed out his career as Towson's all-time leading receiver as well as the Patriot League's all-time leader with 219 receptions. Safety Edmund Carazo led the Patriot League with seven interceptions.

Highlighting the 2003 season was the official dedication of Johnny Unitas Stadium at Towson University. In mid-October, the Tigers entertained a crowd of more than 8,000 that included many Baltimore Colt legends with a 30–13 win over Holy Cross in the Dedication Game. The Tigers, who were 5–1 at their newly named home, finished the season with a 6–6 record. Towson went 3–4 in its final Patriot League season. Senior offensive lineman Jason Gunning and defensive back P.D. Moore were named All-Patriot League for the second time.

The 2004 season marked Towson's entry into the Atlantic 10 where the Tigers were severely challenged. Towson went 0–8 in A-10 play while Moore was named to the A-10's first team defense. Moore became the first Tiger to be named first team all-conference in two different leagues.

The Tigers were much more competitive in 2005, beating Delaware, Rhode Island and Villanova in A-10 games. Non-league wins over Morgan State, Lock Haven and Liberty gave Towson a final 6–5 record. Allante Harrison was named first team All-Atlantic-10 at cornerback.

In 2006, the Tigers enjoyed one of their best seasons as a Division I-AA program. Quarterback Sean Schaefer directed one of the top passing games in the nation and Towson compiled a 7–4 record. Their 4–4 A-10 record included wins over Delaware, Villanova, Richmond and Hofstra.

The Tigers were nationally ranked for six weeks in 2006 and achieved their highest I-AA ranking ever when they were 17th in the nation in late September.

In April 2007, offensive lineman Jermon Bushrod became the fourth Towson football player drafted by an NFL team when he was selected by the New Orleans Saints in the fourth round. Bushrod was a three-time all-conference selection in the A-10.

In 2007, the Atlantic-10 Football Conference became the Colonial Athletic Association and the Tigers entered the season with high expectations. Towson was ranked in the top 25 in the pre-season and got off to a 2–0 start. But, a rash of injuries took their toll and Towson finished with a 3–8 record.

Senior linebacker Brian Bradford had a stellar season in 2007 when he finished second in the nation with 149 tackles in 11 games. In addition to earning first team All-CAA notice, he was a consensus first team All-American.

In 2008, the Tigers celebrated their 40th anniversary with an explosive passing game and a difficult schedule. In the season opener, the Tigers achieved a milestone when they played Navy in Annapolis. Before a crowd of 31,613, the Tigers battled the Mids on nearly even terms in the first half before Navy pulled out a 41–13 victory.

While Schaefer seemed to break a record every week, the Tigers had a difficult time defensively. A third team All-CAA pick, Schaefer led the CAA in passing yards (3,286) and yards of total offense (3,288). He set school career records for pass completions (1044), pass attempts (1610), completion percentage (.648) and passing yardage (11,644). He finished his career ranked eighth among the NCAA Division I FCS all-time passing leaders.

Senior Marcus Lee, his favorite target, set an NCAA Division I FCS record by catching at least one pass in all 45 games of his career. Lee ended his career as Towson's all-time leader with 225 catches for 2,389 yards with 13 touchdowns.

The Tigers finished the 2008 season with a 3–9 record and a 1–7 mark in the CAA.

For only the third time in program history, there was a coaching change after the end of the season. Rob Ambrose, a 1993 Towson graduate who was an assistant coach at the University of Connecticut for seven years, was introduced as Towson's new coach.

==== Under Rob Ambrose (2009–2022) ====
2009 Season

In his first season as head coach, Ambrose led the Tigers to a 2–9 record while going 1–7 in CAA play. The Tigers' lone conference victory came against Rhode Island while their other victory came against Coastal Carolina of the Big South.

2010 Season

Ambrose was met with additional growing pains in his second season as head coach, ending up with a 1–10 record with no conference wins. The Tigers' only win was a memorable one as the Tigers needed 5 overtimes to outlast Coastal Carolina. Several staff changes were made in the off-season, including Ambrose taking over as the team's offensive coordinator. Ambrose was the OC at UConn for three seasons before assuming the head coaching duties at his alma mater.

2011 Season

The 2011 season began with three wins, vaulting the Tigers into the national FCS polls for the first time since 2007. Home wins over instate rival Morgan State 42–3, #20 Villanova 31–10, and 42–17 over the Colgate Raiders, gave the Tigers their first 3–0 start since 2007. Through the first three games the average attendance at Johnny Unitas Stadium was 9,125, which was up from the 2010 season which saw an average crowd of 7,107 fans per game.

The Tigers' next game was a 28–3 setback loss to the in-state Maryland Terrapins, a BCS team from the ACC, a game in which the Tigers outgained the struggling Terps but failed to capitalize on scoring opportunities in the first half. The Tigers came back strong for a last-second 31–28 win over No. 14 Richmond Spiders at Unitas Stadium. This marked the second win for Towson over a Top 25 opponent during the 2011 season and the second victory over a former FCS national champion. Richmond won a title in 2008 and Villanova claimed one in 2009. Following those victories, a thrilling come-from-behind road victory over the Old Dominion, another nationally ranked team, put Towson atop the CAA standings.

The victory of Old Dominion was one of the program's most memorable moments as it defined the never-give-up attitude instilled by Ambrose.

Towson's 3–0 start in CAA play was their best-ever beginning in league action. Towson added to that total the following week with another road win against the nationally ranked William & Mary Tribe. With the win over the Tribe, the Tigers rose to 6–1 overall and 4–0 in CAA play and achieved the highest ranking in school history at No. 13.

The following week the Tigers dropped a tough 35–30 decision to 2010 FCS runners-up, University of Delaware, in a game plagued by snow, sleet and bitter temperatures.

The final three weeks of the 2011 regular season presented a march towards a first-ever CAA Championship and NCAA FCS playoff berth. Road games at Maine and Rhode Island with a home match-up against New Hampshire provided the menu for the Tigers, who were picked to finish dead last in the preseason conference poll.

The game against the Maine Black Bears was played at Alfond Stadium in Orono, Maine. The Towson running game clicked on all counts to total a seasonal high 334 yards en route to a 40–30 victory over the No. 7 Maine. With the win, the Tigers moved into a three-way tie for first place in the CAA with Maine and No. 9 New Hampshire. The loss snapped the Black Bears' six-game winning streak. The Tigers' ground game was led by junior Tremayne Dameron and freshman Terrance West as both of them rushed for more than 100 yards. While Dameron, who had been injured for much of the season, picked up a season high 109 yards on 19 carries, West ran for a then career high 183 yards on 21 carries and scored three rushing touchdowns to increase his NCAA FCS-leading total to 21 touchdowns. The win was Towson's first ever road win over a top 10 opponent and was the fifth victory of the season against a team ranked in the Top 25 and third such win coming on the road in 2011.

The final regular season home game at Unitas Stadium saw the Tigers defeat New Hampshire, 56–42. West would run for a career-best 261 yards and 4 touchdowns, including scores of 72 and 69 yards in the first and second quarters, respectively. The victory, coupled with Maine's triumph over the UMass, vaulted Towson into a two-way tie with the Black Bears for the CAA lead going into the final week of the season, which would see the Black Bears facing off against the Wildcats and the Tigers playing against the Rhode Island.

In the regular season finale against Rhode Island, the Tigers emerged victorious 28–17 after falling behind early in the first quarter 10–0. The Rams defense was able to keep star freshman running back Terrance West under 100 yards rushing for the first time since the October 1st game against Maryland, although he still found the end zone twice to increase his league leading total to 27. Instead, Grant Enders would lead the team to victory in Kingston, Rhode Island, with 212 yards passing and 2 passing touchdowns to junior receiver Tom Ryan. With Maine's 30–27 defeat at the hands of New Hampshire, the Tigers clinched their first-ever CAA title outright. The title made the Tigers the first team in NCAA history to make the postseason at the Division III, Division II, and the Division I FCS levels of college football.

With their automatic bid to the playoffs secured, the Tigers received a first round bye and played the Lehigh (10–1) of the Patriot League at Unitas Stadium in the second round of the Division I FCS Playoffs. The Tigers would lose the game, 40–38, after a fourth quarter sack of Enders by Lehigh defensive lineman Tom Bianchi led to a safety.

2012 season

The Tigers played their most competitive schedule in the history of the program, playing two FBS programs (Kent State and LSU). Even with a tough schedule, Towson came out with a winning record (7–4) which included wins over ranked teams; Delaware, Villanova and New Hampshire. Unfortunately the Tigers missed the playoffs, although some sports writers thought they should have qualified since New Hampshire and Villanova both made the playoffs and there were teams with less competitive schedules selected.

2013 season

The No. 11 ranked Tigers began the year by beating UConn, an FBS team from the American Athletic Conference, by a score of 33–18, giving the Tigers their first victory over a FBS team in program history. The win would be the first in a 6-game win streak to start the season for the Tigers, including wins over Holy Cross, Delaware State, North Carolina Central, Stony Brook, and New Hampshire. The Tigers were handed their first loss of the season during Towson's homecoming weekend at the hands of Villanova. After victories against Albany, Richmond, William & Mary, James Madison, and a loss to Delaware, The Tigers qualified for the FCS playoffs with a final record of 10–2 (6–2 CAA), the program's first double-digit win season at the Division I level.

The Tigers were selected as No. 7 seed for the Division I FCS playoffs and received a first-round bye. They hosted Fordham University (11–2, 0–0 Patriot) at Johnny Unitas Stadium following the Rams' victory over Sacred Heart in the first round of the playoffs. Although Fordham tied the game late in the second quarter, Towson cruised to a 48–28 victory behind a combined 490 yards of offense including 146 total yards and 2 touchdowns from freshman running back Darius Victor, 105 total yards and 3 touchdowns from 2013 CAA first team running back Terrance West, and 310 total yards and three touchdowns from senior quarterback Peter Athens.

In a game played in snowy conditions at O'Brien Stadium, the No. 7 ranked Tigers defeated Eastern Illinois (12–2, 8–0 Ohio Valley), the No. 2 ranked FCS team, 49–39. They did so on the strength of 472 rushing yards and 7 rushing touchdowns, including 354 yards and 5 touchdowns by 2013 Walter Payton Award finalist Terrance West.

The Tigers advanced to the semifinals where they played Eastern Washington (12–3, 8–0 Big Sky) at Roos Field in Cheney, Washington. In a game plagued by fog and wet conditions, the Tigers emerged victorious, 35–31, in a wild shootout over the host Eagles. After the Tigers jumped out to an early 21–0 lead, the Eagles scored 31 unanswered points and knocked Towson starting quarterback Peter Athens out of the game with a shoulder injury. The Tigers would then score 14 unanswered points behind Terrance West and sophomore backup quarterback Connor Frazier to win the game and qualify for the school's first ever Division I FCS national title game.

At Toyota Stadium, The Tigers (13–3, 6–2 CAA) were defeated by three-time defending national champion North Dakota State (15–0, 8–0 MVC) for the NCAA FCS National Championship. Despite a gallant beginning effort in which the Tigers played the Bison to stalemate, the defending champions would pull away in impressive fashion, shutting down the Tigers, 35–7. Terrance West was held under 100 yards rushing for only the third time this year, giving Towson a 1–2 record in such games. West added 39 yards receiving to give him 138 all purpose yards. Although Towson quarterback Peter Athens outgained NDSU's Brock Jensen through the air, the Bison's pummeling run game was the factor that proved too much for Towson to handle. The Bison got 170 total rushing yards from their duo, senior Sam Ojuri and junior John Crockett - more than Towson's entire running back corps.

2014 season

With the loss of Terrance West and other experienced players, Towson struggled through the 2014 season. Much of the difficulty was attributed to player injuries and the inexperience of a very youthful team. Many starters were sophomores while, there were also several freshmen who had significant playing time. The offensive front consisted of 1 junior, 4 sophomores and a freshman. Running back Darius Victor still finished the season with 1,350 rushing yards.

2015 – 2017 Seasons

The 2015 season would see a return to Towson's recent success and winning tradition as the team posted a 7–4 (5–3 CAA) record. The team would, however, miss the playoffs for the second straight year and for the third time in four years.

That success was short lived as the Tigers have posted back to back losing seasons in 2016 (4–7) and 2017 (5–6), making it four straight seasons of missing the playoffs.

2018 Season

Towson finished the 2018 campaign with a return to the Division I FCS playoffs and a 7–5 overall record and a 5–3 conference record. Towson traveled to FBS Wake Forest in week two after dominating rival Morgan State 36–10.

2019 Season

Towson again finished the regular season with a 7–5 overall record, but finishing 4–4 in the conference was not enough to make the playoffs. Towson traveled to FBS University of Florida in the middle of a three game losing streak.

2020 Season

Postponed due to COVID-19. CAA season moved to Spring 2021; Towson opted out of the Spring 2021 competition period and will compete in the fall 2021. Of note, Towson once again had an FBS opponent scheduled, which was Maryland.

2021 Season

The Tigers would finish with a 4–7 record while going 3–5 in CAA play. The Tigers' three conference victories came against Albany, Stony Brook and one over No. 12 Rhode Island while their fourth victory came against rival Morgan State in their road opener.

2022 Season

The Tigers would finish with a 6–5 record while going 4–4 in CAA play. The athletics department announced that Rob Ambrose will not be retained as head coach. Effective immediately, special teams coordinator Lyndon Johnson will serve as interim head coach. Towson announced Pete Shinnick as the team's 5th all-time head coach on December 11, 2022.

==== Under Pete Shinnick (2023–present) ====
2023 Season

The Tigers would finish with a 5–6 record while going 4–4 in CAA play. Two conference wins were over No. 14 William & Mary and No. 13 New Hampshire on the road. They also played Maryland as their scheduled FBS opponent and beat rival Morgan State.

== Current coaching staff ==
Name	Position	Year	Alma mater	Social Media
Pete Shinnick	Head coach	2023	Colorado (1986)	Coach Pete Shinnick (@PeteShinnick) / X profile
Darian Dulin	Defensive coordinator/Defensive backs	2023	Southwestern (1997)	Darian Dulin (@DarianDulin) / X profile
Alex Krutsch	Outside linebackers/special teams coach	2023	Northern Illinois (2008)	Alex Krutsch (@CoachKrutsch) / X profile
Brian Sheppard	Offensive coordinator/quarterbacks coach	2023	Baker (2006)	B. Sheppard (@coachbshep) / X profile
Britt Myers	Inside linebackers/recruiting coordinator	2023	Indiana (2011)	Britt Myers (@CoachBMyers) / X profile
Levern Belin	Defensive line coach	2023	Wake Forest (1991)	Levern Belin (@LevernBelin) / X profile
Alex Kolt	Offensive line coach	2023	Hampden–Sydney (2010)	Alex Kolt (@CoachKolt) / X profile
Harry Richards	Running backs coach	2023	James Madison (2017)	Harry Richards (@CoachHRichards) / X profile
DJ Stewart	Wide receivers coach	2023	DePauw (2015)	DJ Stewart (@CoachDJSteward) / X profile
Tyson Wachenheim	Tight ends coach	2023	Christopher Newport (2015)	Tyson Wachenheim (@CoachTWach) / X profile
Marcus Walker	Cornerbacks coach	2023	Oklahoma (2012)	Marcus Walker (@CoachMWalker) / X profile
Lance Yaniger	Director of football operations	2014	Towson (2011)	Lance Yaniger (@lanceyaniger) / X profile
Donovan Bohn	Defensive quality control coach	2023	Minnesota Duluth (2022)	Donovan Bohn (@CoachDBohn) / X profile
Bailey Anderson	Offensive quality control coach	2024	Dordt (2019)	Bailey Anderson (@CoachBAnderson_) / X profile
LJ Fenlock	Offensive quality control coach	2024		LJ Fenlock (@coachfenlock) / X profile
Jake Vieux	Director of football performance	2023	Colorado State (2016)	

== Head coaches ==
Head Coach	Years	Seasons	Record	Pct.	Conf. Titles	Post-season record	National Title Games
Carl Runk	1969–1971	3	11–14–1	.442	0	0–0	0
Phil Albert	1972–1991	20	117–91–3	.562	0	3–4	1
Gordy Combs	1992–2008	17	92–90	.505	0	0–0	0
Rob Ambrose	2009–2022	11	76–76	.500	2	3–3	1
Pete Shinnick	2023–present	3	18–17	.514	0	0–0	0

== Conference affiliations ==
Conference	Division	Time period
Mason-Dixon Conference	NCAA College Division	1969–1974
NCAA Division III Independent	NCAA Division III	1975–1978
NCAA Division II Independent	NCAA Division II	1979–1986
NCAA Division I-AA Independent	NCAA Division I-AA	1987–1996
Patriot League	NCAA Division I-AA	1997–2003
Atlantic 10 Conference	NCAA Division I-AA	2004–2006
Colonial/Coastal Athletic Association	NCAA Division I FCS	2007–present

== Championships ==
=== Conference championships ===
Year	Coach	Conference	Conference record
2011	Rob Ambrose	Colonial Athletic Association	7–1
2012†	Rob Ambrose	Colonial Athletic Association	6–2
Total conference championships		2

† Co-champions

== Playoffs ==
=== Division III ===
The Tigers, then known as the Towson State Tigers, made one appearance in the Division III playoffs. They had a combined record of 2–1.

Year	Round	Opponent	Result
1976	Quarterfinals; Semifinals; Championship (Stagg Bowl IV)	C.W. Post; St. Lawrence; St. John's	W, 14–10; W, 38–36; L, 28–31

=== Division II ===
The Tigers, still then known as the Towson State Tigers, made three appearances in the Division II playoffs. They had a combined record of 1–3.

Year	Round	Opponent	Result
1983	Quarterfinals	North Dakota State	L, 17–24
1984	Quarterfinals; Semifinals	Norfolk State; Troy State	W, 31–21; L, 3–45
1986	Quarterfinals	Central State (OH)	L, 0–31

=== Division I-AA/FCS ===
The Tigers have made three appearances in the NCAA Division I Football Championship Subdivision playoffs. They have a combined record of 3–3.

Year	Round	Opponent	Result
2011	Second Round	Lehigh	L, 38–40
2013	Second Round; Quarterfinals; Semifinals; Championship	Fordham; Eastern Illinois; Eastern Washington; North Dakota State	W, 48–28; W, 49–39; W, 35–31; L, 7–35
2018	First Round	Duquesne	L, 10–31

== National individual awards ==
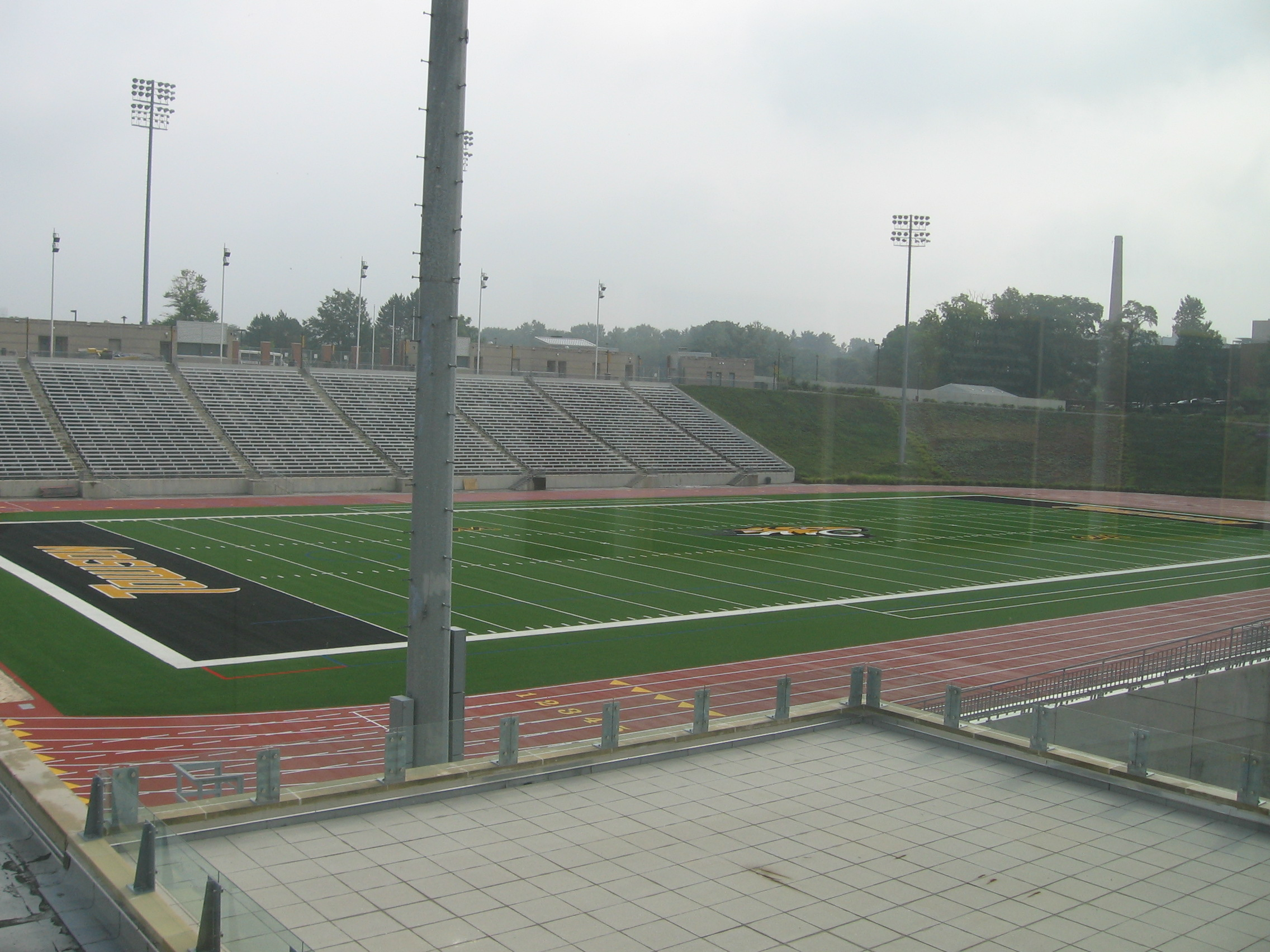
Johnny Unitas Stadium

NCAA Division II Hall of Fame	2006: Sean Landeta (P)
Walter Payton Award	1988: Dave Meggett (RB)
Jerry Rice Award	2011: Terrance West (RB)
Eddie Robinson Award	2011: Rob Ambrose (Head Coach)
NCAA Division I-AA/FCS First-Team All-Americans	1993: Tony Vinson (RB); 1994: Mark Orlando (WR); 1999: Jamal White (WR); 2000: Andrew Hollingsworth (DL); 2007: Brian Bradford (LB); 2011: Terrance West (RB), Tyler Wharton (FB)
NCAA Division II Football First-Team All-American	1978: Ken Snoots (SE); 1982: Sean Landeta (P); 1983: Gary Rubeling (DB); 1984: Terry Banks (G); 1985: Stan Eisenhooth (OL); 1986: David Haden (LB)
NCAA Division III Football First-Team All-Americans	1975: Dan Dullea (QB); 1976: Skip Chase (SE); 1977: Randy Bielski (DB)

== Tigers in the Pros ==
=== Active ===
- DL Tibo Debaillie – Edmonton Elks (CFL) (2021–present)
- LB Malik Tyne - Edmonton Elks (CFL) (2021–present)
- DL Frank Beltre – Calgary Stampeders (CFL) (2014–2016), New York Jets (2017), Toronto Argonauts (CFL) (2018–2019), Ottawa Redblacks (CFL) (2021–present)
- CB Tye Smith – Seattle Seahawks (2015–2016), Washington Redskins (2017), Tennessee Titans (2017–2021), Minnesota Vikings (2021), Orlando Guardians (2023-present)
- S Jordan Dangerfield – Brooklyn Bolts (FXFL) (2014), Pittsburgh Steelers (2014–2020)

=== Former ===
- P Sean Landeta – Philadelphia Stars (USFL) (1983–1984), Baltimore Stars (USFL) (1985), New York Giants (1985–1993, 2006), St. Louis Rams (1993–1996, 2003–2004), Tampa Bay Buccaneers (1997), Green Bay Packers (1998), Philadelphia Eagles (1999–2002, 2005)
- WR Marc Brown – Buffalo Bills (1987)
- OL Stan Eisenhooth – Seattle Seahawks (1988), Indianapolis Colts (1989)
- RB Dave Meggett – New York Giants (1989–1994), New England Patriots (1995–1997), New York Jets (1998)
- DB Chad Scott – Pittsburgh Steelers (1997–2004), New England Patriots (2005–2006)
- DB Madieu Williams – Cincinnati Bengals (2004–2007), Minnesota Vikings (2008–2010), San Francisco 49ers (2011), Washington Redskins (2012)
- OL Jermon Bushrod – New Orleans Saints (2007–2012), Chicago Bears (2013–2015), Miami Dolphins (2016-2017) New Orleans Saints (2018)
- RB Terrance West – Cleveland Browns (2014–2015), Tennessee Titans (2015), Baltimore Ravens (2015–2017), New Orleans Saints (2018)
- DE Ryan Delaire – Tampa Bay Buccaneers (2015), Carolina Panthers (2015–2016), Indianapolis Colts (2018), San Francisco 49ers (2018)
- QB Tom Flacco – Saskatchewan Roughriders and Ottawa Redblacks (CFL) (2021–2022)
- QB Dan Crowley - Baltimore Stallions, Montreal Alouettes, Bergamo Lions, Edmonton Eskimos, Ottawa Renegades

== Rivals ==
Towson University and Morgan State University share a rivalry called The Battle for Greater Baltimore. Towson leads the rivalry with 24 football victories versus 7 losses.

== Future non-conference opponents ==
Announced schedules as of October 1, 2026.

2027	2028	2029	2030	2031
at Ohio	at Maryland	at William & Mary	at Navy	at Morgan State
at Morgan State	Morgan State	at Morgan State	Morgan State	
Norfolk State	at Youngstown State	Dartmouth	at Maryland	
			William & Mary	
