= 2007 Arizona Cardinals season =

NFL team season

- Owner: Bill Bidwill
- General manager: Rod Graves
- Head coach: Ken Whisenhunt
- Home stadium: University of Phoenix Stadium

Results
- Record: 8–8
- Division place: 2nd NFC West
- Playoffs: Did not qualify
- Pro Bowlers: WR Larry Fitzgerald; DT Darnell Dockett

Uniform
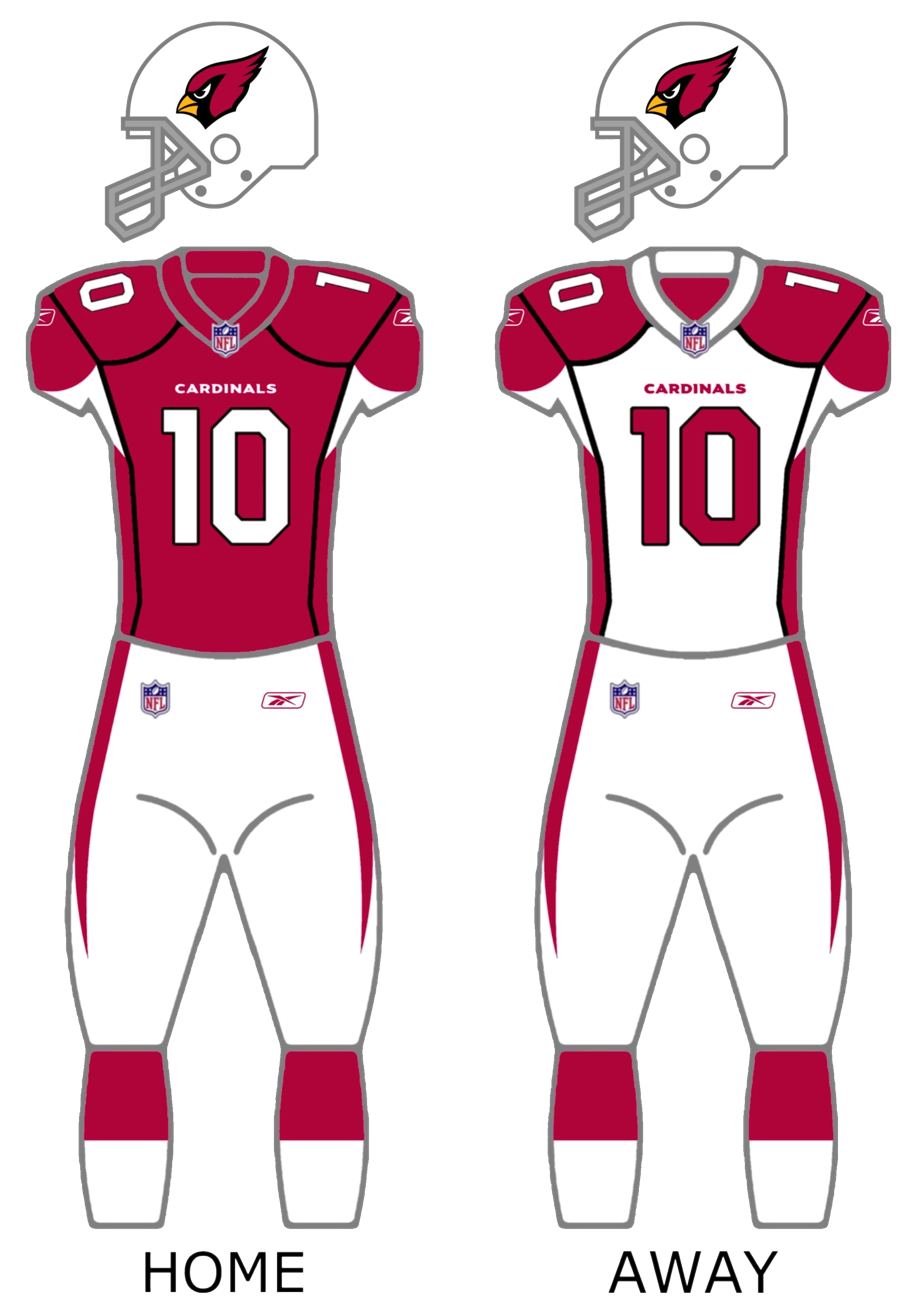

The 2007 season was the Arizona Cardinals' 88th in the National Football League (NFL), their 20th in Arizona and their first under head coach Ken Whisenhunt. They improved upon their 5–11 record in 2006 after finishing last place in the NFC West, by finishing 8–8, but the failure of the Cardinals to qualify for the Super Bowl marked the 23rd consecutive year in which the Super Bowl did not include the team in whose region the game was being played in; Super Bowl XIV and Super Bowl XIX were the only postseasons with such an occurrence before 2007.

Two losses to the San Francisco 49ers, who won only five games that season, came back to haunt them in the end, as they were mathematically eliminated from playoff contention for the ninth straight season. Nonetheless, Pro Football Reference argues that the 2007 Cardinals had the easiest schedule of any team that did not make the playoffs since the 1965 Eagles: they never opposed any team with a better record than 10–6 in any of their sixteen games.

== Offseason ==
=== Free agents heading into the 2007 season ===
Position	Player	Free agency tag	Date signed	2007 team
LB	Monty Beisel	UFA	March 14	Arizona Cardinals
S	Jack Brewer	UFA		Unsigned
DE	Chris Cooper	UFA	March 24	Arizona Cardinals
LB	James Darling	UFA		Unsigned
OT	Leonard Davis	UFA	March 5	Dallas Cowboys
S	Robert Griffith	UFA		Retired
MLB	Orlando Huff	UFA	June 22	Atlanta Falcons
C	Nick Leckey	RFA	April 13	Arizona Cardinals
OG	Chris Liwienski	UFA	March 22	Miami Dolphins
CB	David Macklin	UFA	April 5	Washington Redskins
S	Hanik Milligan	UFA	March 3	Arizona Cardinals
QB	John Navarre	RFA	March 13	Indianapolis Colts
RB	Marcel Shipp	UFA	March 3	Arizona Cardinals
DE	Antonio Smith	ERFA	April 4	Arizona Cardinals
C	Alex Stepanovich	RFA	March 16	Cincinnati Bengals
CB	Robert Tate	UFA		Unsigned
OT/TE	Fred Wakefield	UFA	March 10	Oakland Raiders
WR	Troy Walters	UFA	June 1	Detroit Lions

=== Free agents signed for 2007 season ===
Position	Player	Free agency tag	Date signed	2006 team	contract years
C	Al Johnson	UFA	March 4	Dallas Cowboys	4 years
CB	Roderick Hood	UFA	March 10	Philadelphia Eagles	5 years
WR	Sean Morey	UFA	March 15	Pittsburgh Steelers	3 years
FB	Terrelle Smith	UFA	March 23	Cleveland Browns	2 years
OT	Mike Gandy	UFA	April 3	Buffalo Bills	3 years
DT	Ross Kolodziej	UFA	April 12	Minnesota Vikings	1 year
DE	Rodney Bailey	UFA	April 12	Minnesota Vikings	1 year
DT	Joe Tafoya	UFA	April 12	Minnesota Vikings	1 year
CB	Ralph Brown	UFA	April 12	Minnesota Vikings	1 year
WR	Ahmad Merritt	UFA	May 4	Chicago Bears	1 year
TE	Tim Euhus	UFA	May 29	Pittsburgh Steelers	1 year
S	Oliver Celestin	UFA	Aug 2	Seattle Seahawks	1 year
G	Brad Badger	UFA	Aug 15	Oakland Raiders	1 year
C	Chukky Okobi	UFA	Sep 12	Pittsburgh Steelers	1 year

=== Draft ===
2007 Arizona Cardinals draft
Round	Pick	Player	Position	College	Notes
1	5	Levi Brown	OT	Penn State	
2	33	Alan Branch	DT	Michigan	
3	69	Buster Davis	LB	Florida State	
5	142	Steve Breaston	WR	Michigan	
7	215	Ben Patrick	TE	Delaware	
Made roster † Pro Football Hall of Fame * Made at least one Pro Bowl during career

=== Head coach ===
Head coach Ken Whisenhunt entered his first year of his term with the Cardinals. He was previously the offensive coordinator for the Pittsburgh Steelers. Whisenhunt signed a contract with the Cardinals on January 14, 2007 after the Cardinals released former head coach Dennis Green.

== Roster ==
Arizona Cardinals 2007 final roster
Quarterbacks: 4 Tim Hasselbeck; 12 Tim Rattay; 13 Kurt Warner; Running backs: 28 J. J. Arrington KR; 46 Tim Castille FB; 32 Edgerrin James; 31 Marcel Shipp; 45 Terrelle Smith FB; Wide receivers: 81 Anquan Boldin; 15 Steve Breaston KR/PR; 11 Larry Fitzgerald; 80 Bryant Johnson; 87 Sean Morey; 10 Jamaica Rector; 85 Jerheme Urban; Tight ends: 83 Troy Bienemann; 84 Tim Euhus; 89 Ben Patrick	Offensive linemen: 61 Elton Brown T; 75 Levi Brown T; 69 Mike Gandy T; 50 Al Johnson C; 76 Deuce Lutui G; 63 Lyle Sendlein C; 73 Keydrick Vincent G; 74 Reggie Wells G; Defensive linemen: 91 Rodney Bailey DE; 78 Alan Branch DT; 93 Chris Cooper DE/DT; 90 Darnell Dockett DT; 95 Bo Schobel DE; 94 Antonio Smith DE; 71 Joe Tafoya DE; 98 Gabe Watson DT	Linebackers: 52 Monty Beisel MLB/OLB; 51 Darryl Blackstock OLB; 58 Karlos Dansby OLB; 54 Gerald Hayes MLB; 57 David Holloway OLB; 59 Brandon Johnson OLB; 97 Calvin Pace OLB; Defensive backs: 27 Michael Adams CB; 20 Ralph Brown CB; 35 Oliver Celestin SS; 47 Aaron Francisco SS; 34 Bhawoh Jue FS; 42 Terrence Holt FS; 26 Roderick Hood CB; 21 Antrel Rolle CB; 22 Matt Ware FS; Special teams: 17 Mitch Berger P; 48 Nathan Hodel LS; 1 Neil Rackers K	Reserve lists: 92 Bertrand Berry DE (IR); 25 Eric Green CB (IR); 96 Ross Kolodziej DT (IR); 7 Matt Leinart QB (IR); 86 Ahmad Merritt WR (IR); 56 Chike Okeafor DE (IR); 82 Leonard Pope TE (IR); 79 Oliver Ross T (IR); 24 Adrian Wilson S (IR); Practice squad: 41 Travarous Bain CB; 33 Steve Baylark RB; 18 Jemalle Cornelius WR; 23 DeMario Minter CB; 64 Scott Peters C/G; 49 Alex Shor TE; 72 Brandon Torrey T; 68 Elliot Vallejo T; rookies in italics 53 active, 9 inactive, 8 practice squad

== Staff ==
Arizona Cardinals 2007 coaching staff
Front office: Chairman/President – William V. Bidwill; Vice president/general counsel – Michael J. Bidwill; Vice-president – William V. Bidwill, Jr.; Vice President, Football Operations – Rod Graves; Head coaches: Head coach – Ken Whisenhunt; Assistant head coach/offensive line – Russ Grimm; Offensive coaches: Offensive coordinator – Todd Haley; Quarterbacks – Jeff Rutledge; Running backs – Maurice Carthon; Wide receivers – Mike Miller; Tight ends – Freddie Kitchens; Offensive quality control – Dedric Ward	Defensive coaches: Defensive coordinator – Clancy Pendergast; Defensive line – Ron Aiken; Linebackers – Billy Davis; Defensive backs – Teryl Austin; Assistant defensive backs – Rick Courtright; Defensive assistant – Matt Raich; Special teams coaches: Special teams – Kevin Spencer; Strength and conditioning: Strength and conditioning – John Lott; Assistant strength and conditioning – Keith Vulgamott

== Schedule ==
In the 2007 regular season, the Cardinals’ non-divisional, conference opponents were primarily from the NFC South, although they also played the Washington Redskins from the NFC East, and the Detroit Lions from the NFC North. Their non-conference opponents were from the AFC North.

Week	Date	Opponent	Result	Record	Venue
1	September 10	at **San Francisco 49ers**	**L** 17–20	0–1	Monster Park
2	September 16	**Seattle Seahawks**	**W** 23–20	1–1	University of Phoenix Stadium
3	September 23	at Baltimore Ravens	**L** 23–26	1–2	M&T Bank Stadium
4	September 30	Pittsburgh Steelers	**W** 21–14	2–2	University of Phoenix Stadium
5	October 7	at **St. Louis Rams**	**W** 34–31	3–2	Edward Jones Dome
6	October 14	Carolina Panthers	**L** 10–25	3–3	University of Phoenix Stadium
7	October 21	at Washington Redskins	**L** 19–21	3–4	FedExField
8	Bye				
9	November 4	at Tampa Bay Buccaneers	**L** 10–17	3–5	Raymond James Stadium
10	November 11	Detroit Lions	**W** 31–21	4–5	University of Phoenix Stadium
11	November 18	at Cincinnati Bengals	**W** 35–27	5–5	Paul Brown Stadium
12	November 25	**San Francisco 49ers**	**L** 31–37 (OT)	5–6	University of Phoenix Stadium
13	December 2	Cleveland Browns	**W** 27–21	6–6	University of Phoenix Stadium
14	December 9	at **Seattle Seahawks**	**L** 21–42	6–7	Qwest Field
15	December 16	at New Orleans Saints	**L** 24–31	6–8	Louisiana Superdome
16	December 23	Atlanta Falcons	**W** 30–27 (OT)	7–8	University of Phoenix Stadium
17	December 30	**St. Louis Rams**	**W** 48–19	8–8	University of Phoenix Stadium

Note: Intra-division opponents are in bold text.

== Standings ==
NFC West
	W	L	T	PCT	DIV	CONF	PF	PA	STK
^{(3)} Seattle Seahawks	10	6	0	.625	5–1	8–4	393	291	L1
Arizona Cardinals	8	8	0	.500	3–3	5–7	404	399	W2
San Francisco 49ers	5	11	0	.313	3–3	4–8	219	364	L1
St. Louis Rams	3	13	0	.188	1–5	3–9	263	438	L4

== Game summaries ==
=== Week 1: at San Francisco 49ers ===
Week 1: Arizona Cardinals at San Francisco 49ers – Game summary

Quarter	1	2	3	4	Total
Cardinals	0	10	0	7	17
49ers	7	3	3	7	20

at Monster Park, San Francisco, California

- Date: September 10
- Game time: 7:25 p.m. MST and PST
- Game weather: 64 °F (18 °C)
- Game attendance: 68,111
- Referee: Walt Coleman
- TV announcers (ESPN): Mike Greenberg, Mike Golic and Mike Ditka
- Box Score

Game information

First quarter

- SF – Frank Gore 6-yard run (Joe Nedney kick), 11:21. 49ers 7–0. Drive: 2 plays, 6 yards, 0:09.

Second quarter

- ARI – Neil Rackers 35-yard field goal, 12:51. 49ers 7–3. Drive: 13 plays, 53 yards, 7:12.
- ARI – Edgerrin James 7-yard run (Neil Rackers kick), 9:10. Cardinals 10–7. Drive: 5 plays, 36 yards, 2:39.
- SF – Joe Nedney 33-yard field goal, 3:35. Tied 10–10. Drive: 11 plays, 51 yards, 5:35.

Third quarter

- SF – Joe Nedney 30-yard field goal, 11:15. 49ers 13–10. Drive: 5 plays, 21 yards, 2:21.

Fourth quarter

- ARI – Anquan Boldin 5-yard pass from Matt Leinart (Neil Rackers kick), 6:40. Cardinals 17–13. Drive: 9 plays, 58 yards, 4:29.
- SF – Arnaz Battle 1-yard run (Joe Nedney kick), 0:22. 49ers 20–17. Drive: 12 plays, 86 yards, 2:36.

Top passers

- ARI – Matt Leinart – 14/28, 102 yards, TD, 2 INT
- SF – Alex Smith – 15/31, 126 yards

Top rushers

- ARI – Edgerrin James – 26 rushes, 92 yards, TD
- SF – Frank Gore – 18 rushes, 55 yards, TD

Top receivers

- ARI – Anquan Boldin – 4 receptions, 22 yards, TD
- SF – Arnaz Battle – 5 receptions, 60 yards

The Cardinals began their 2007 campaign on the road against their NFC West foe, the San Francisco 49ers. In the first quarter, Arizona trailed early as 49ers RB Frank Gore got a 6-yard TD run for the only score of the period. In the second quarter, the Cardinals took the lead with kicker Neil Rackers getting a 35-yard field goal, while RB Edgerrin James got a 7-yard TD run. San Francisco would tie the game with kicker Joe Nedney getting a 33-yard field goal.

In the third quarter, the 49ers regained the lead with Nedney kicking a 30-yard field goal for the only score of the period. In the fourth quarter, the Cardinals retook the lead with QB Matt Leinart completing a 5-yard TD pass to WR Anquan Boldin. However, late in the game, the Cards' defense failed to hold off San Francisco's ensuing drive, which ended with WR Arnaz Battle getting a 1-yard TD run. With just over :20 seconds left in the game, Arizona had one final chance to save the game. Leinart's pass to WR Larry Fitzgerald was intercepted by 49ers CB Shawntae Spencer.

With the heartbreaking loss, the Cardinals began their season at 0–1.

=== Week 2: vs. Seattle Seahawks ===
Week 2: Seattle Seahawks at Arizona Cardinals – Game summary

Quarter	1	2	3	4	Total
Seahawks	0	7	10	3	20
Cardinals	3	14	0	6	23

at University of Phoenix Stadium, Glendale, Arizona

- Date: September 16
- Game time: 1:05 p.m. MST
- Game weather: None (retractable roof closed)
- Game attendance: 64,542
- Referee: Ron Winter
- TV announcers (Fox): Chris Rose and Terry Donahue
- Box Score

Game information

First quarter

- ARI – Neil Rackers 28-yard field goal, 1:27. Cardinals 3–0. Drive: 6 plays, 21 yards, 3:05.

Second quarter

- ARI – Leonard Pope 30-yard pass from Matt Leinart (Neil Rackers kick), 14:07. Cardinals 10–0. Drive: 4 plays, 70 yards, 1:45.
- ARI – Edgerrin James 17-yard run (Neil Rackers kick), 5:43. Cardinals 17–0. Drive: 5 plays, 38 yards, 3:31.
- SEA – Nate Burleson 24-yard pass from Matt Hasselbeck (Josh Brown kick), 1:16. Cardinals 17–7. Drive: 10 plays, 80 yards, 4:27.

Third quarter

- SEA – Shaun Alexander 16-yard run (Josh Brown kick), 8:42. Cardinals 17–14. Drive: 8 plays, 52 yards, 3:13.
- SEA – Josh Brown 28-yard field goal, 3:34. Tied 17–17. Drive: 8 plays, 51 yards, 2:41.

Fourth quarter

- SEA – Josh Brown 28-yard field goal, 9:52. Seahawks 20–17. Drive: 9 plays, 78 yards, 4:19.
- ARI – Neil Rackers 52-yard field goal, 4:44. Tied 20–20. Drive: 9 plays, 46 yards, 5:08.
- ARI – Neil Rackers 42-yard field goal, 0:01. Cardinals 23–20. Drive: 5 plays, 22 yards, 1:47.

Top passers

- SEA – Matt Hasselbeck – 22/36, 281 yards, TD
- ARI – Matt Leinart – 23/37, 299 yards, TD, INT

Top rushers

- SEA – Shaun Alexander – 18 rushes, 70 yards, TD
- ARI – Edgerrin James – 24 rushes, 128 yards, TD

Top receivers

- SEA – Deion Branch – 7 receptions, 122 yards
- ARI – Larry Fitzgerald – 7 receptions, 87 yards

Hoping to rebound from their tough divisional road loss to the 49ers, the Cardinals played their Week 2 homeopener against another NFC West foe, the Seattle Seahawks. In the first quarter, the Cards took to the skies first with kicker Neil Rackers getting a 28-yard field goal for the only score of the period. In the second quarter, Arizona continued to pound away with QB Matt Leinart completing a 30-yard TD pass to TE Leonard Pope, along RB Edgerrin James getting a 17-yard TD run. The Seahawks would get their only score of the half with QB Matt Hasselbeck completing a 24-yard TD pass to WR Nate Burleson.

In the third quarter, the Cardinals' lead was gone with Seattle RB Shaun Alexander getting a 16-yard TD run and kicker Josh Brown getting a 28-yard field goal. In the fourth quarter, the Cards trailed as Brown got another 28-yard field goal. Arizona responded with Rackers kicking a 52-yard field goal. Late in the game, the Cards defense managed to recover a Seahawk fumble. It would eventually turn into Rackers' 4th career game-winning field goal as made it from 42 yards out as time ran out.

With the win, the Cardinals improved to 1–1.

=== Week 3: at Baltimore Ravens ===
Week 3: Arizona Cardinals at Baltimore Ravens – Game summary

Quarter	1	2	3	4	Total
Cardinals	0	3	3	17	23
Ravens	3	17	3	3	26

at M&T Bank Stadium, Baltimore, Maryland

- Date: September 23
- Game time: 1:00 p.m. EDT/10:00 a.m. MST
- Game weather: Sunny, 75 °F (24 °C)
- Game attendance: 71,372
- Referee: Jerome Boger
- TV announcers (Fox): Thom Brennaman and Tim Hasselbeck
- Box Score

Game information

First quarter

- BAL – Matt Stover 21-yard field goal, 7:14. Ravens 3–0. Drive: 14 plays, 77 yards, 7:46.

Second quarter

- BAL – Matt Stover 28-yard field goal, 10:52. Ravens 6–0. Drive: 14 plays, 72 yards, 8:49.
- ARI – Neil Rackers 48-yard field goal, 5:14. Ravens 6–3. Drive: 6 plays, 51 yards, 1:41.
- BAL – Derrick Mason 13-yard pass from Steve McNair (Matt Stover kick), 1:55. Ravens 13–3. Drive: 8 plays, 60 yards, 3:19.
- BAL – Yamon Figurs 75-yard punt return (Matt Stover kick), 0:55. Ravens 20–3.

Third quarter

- ARI – Neil Rackers 40-yard field goal, 5:18. Ravens 20–6. Drive: 6 plays, 13 yards, 2:56.
- BAL – Matt Stover 43-yard field goal, 0:16. Ravens 23–6. Drive: 10 plays, 48 yards, 4:45.

Fourth quarter

- ARI – Anquan Boldin 5-yard pass from Kurt Warner (Neil Rackers kick), 12:02. Ravens 23–13. Drive: 7 plays, 71 yards, 3:14.
- ARI – Anquan Boldin 32-yard pass from Kurt Warner (Neil Rackers kick), 10:19. Ravens 23–20. Drive: 2 plays, 54 yards, 0:33.
- ARI – Neil Rackers 41-yard field goal, 1:50. Tied 23–23. Drive: 10 plays, 64 yards, 3:43.
- BAL – Matt Stover 46-yard field goal, 0:00. Ravens 26–23. Drive: 9 plays, 52 yards, 1:50.

Top passers

- ARI – Kurt Warner – 15/20, 258 yards, 2 TD
- BAL – Steve McNair – 20/27, 198 yards, TD

Top rushers

- ARI – Edgerrin James – 10 rushes, 57 yards
- BAL – Willis McGahee – 21 rushes, 98 yards

Top receivers

- ARI – Anquan Boldin – 14 receptions, 181 yards, 2 TD
- BAL – Derrick Mason – 8 receptions, 79 yards, TD

Coming off their divisional home win over the Seahawks, the Cardinals flew to M&T Bank Stadium for an intraconference "bird" battle with the Baltimore Ravens. In the first quarter, the Ravens flew first with kicker Matt Stover getting a 21-yard field goal for the only score of the period. In the second quarter, the Ravens increased their lead with Stover's 28-yard field goal. Arizona would manage to get on the board with kicker Neil Rackers getting a 48-yard field goal, yet Baltimore managed to put more and more distance from the Cards with QB Steve McNair completing a 13-yard TD pass to WR Derrick Mason, along with WR/PR Yamon Figurs returning a punt 75 yards for a touchdown.

In the third quarter, the Cardinals managed to get a 40-yard field goal from Rackers, yet the Ravens continued its domination with Stover getting a 43-yard field goal. In the fourth quarter, with QB Matt Leinart being ineffective, back-up QB Kurt Warner came in and ignited the Cards' offense with a 5-yard TD pass and a 32-yard TD pass to WR Anquan Boldin. Afterwards, Arizona tied the game with Rackers getting a 41-yard field goal. The Ravens got a last-second win with Stover nailing a 46-yard field goal.

With the loss, the Cardinals fell to 1–2.

=== Week 4: vs. Pittsburgh Steelers ===
Week 4: Pittsburgh Steelers at Arizona Cardinals – Game summary

Quarter	1	2	3	4	Total
Steelers	7	0	0	7	14
Cardinals	0	0	7	14	21

at University of Phoenix Stadium, Glendale, Arizona

- Date: September 30
- Game time: 1:15 p.m. MST
- Game weather: None (retractable roof closed)
- Game attendance: 64,844
- Referee: Gene Steratore
- TV announcers (CBS): Greg Gumbel and Dan Dierdorf
- Box Score

Game information

First quarter

- PIT – Santonio Holmes 43-yard pass from Ben Roethlisberger (Jeff Reed kick), 0:31. Steelers 7–0. Drive: 8 plays, 69 yards, 4:33.

Second quarter

- No scoring plays

Third quarter

- ARI – Jerheme Urban 6-yard pass from Kurt Warner (Neil Rackers kick), 7:24. Tied 7–7. Drive: 9 plays, 70 yards, 3:43.

Fourth quarter

- ARI – Steve Breaston 73-yard punt return (Neil Rackers kick), 14:10. Cardinals 14–7.
- ARI – Edgerrin James 2-yard run (Neil Rackers kick), 4:14. Cardinals 21–7. Drive: 13 plays, 82 yards, 7:19.
- PIT – Santonio Holmes 7-yard pass from Ben Roethlisberger (Jeff Reed kick), 1:49. Cardinals 21–14. Drive: 9 plays, 92 yards, 2:25.

Top passers

- PIT – Ben Roethlisberger – 17/32, 244 yards, 2 TD, 2 INT
- ARI – Kurt Warner – 14/21, 132 yards, TD

Top rushers

- PIT – Willie Parker – 19 rushes, 37 yards
- ARI – Edgerrin James – 21 rushes, 77 yards, TD

Top receivers

- PIT – Santonio Holmes – 6 receptions, 128 yards, 2 TD
- ARI – Larry Fitzgerald – 10 receptions, 120 yards

Trying to rebound from their road loss to the Ravens, the Cardinals went home for another interconference fight, as they would face the Pittsburgh Steelers. In the first quarter, Arizona trailed as Steelers QB Ben Roethlisberger completed a 43-yard TD pass to WR Santonio Holmes for the only score of the quarter. However, in the third quarter, the Cards started to fight back. As starting QB Matt Leinart struggled, back-up QB Kurt Warner came in and completed a 6-yard TD pass to WR Jerheme Urban for the only score of the period. In the fourth quarter, Leinart was put back in and the Cardinals didn't miss a beat as rookie WR Steve Breaston returned a punt 73 yards for a touchdown, along with RB Edgerrin James getting a 2-yard TD pass. However, Pittsburgh retaliated as Roethlisberger and Holmes hooked up with each other again on a 7-yard TD pass. Afterwards, Arizona held off an attempt to tie the game and won. Both teams would eventually meet again in Super Bowl XLIII.

With the win, the Cardinals improved to 2–2.

=== Week 5: at St. Louis Rams ===
Week 5: Arizona Cardinals at St. Louis Rams – Game summary

Quarter	1	2	3	4	Total
Cardinals	3	14	3	14	34
Rams	3	10	7	11	31

at Edward Jones Dome, St. Louis, Missouri

- Date: December 3
- Game time: 12:00 p.m. CDT/10:00 a.m. MST
- Game weather: None (indoor stadium)
- Game attendance: 61,788
- Referee: Gerry Austin
- TV announcers (Fox): Matt Vasgersian and J.C. Pearson
- Box Score

Game information

First quarter

- STL – Jeff Wilkins 46-yard field goal, 8:31. Rams 3–0. Drive: 9 plays, 33 yards, 3:43.
- ARI – Neil Rackers 50-yard field goal, 3:57. Tied 3–3. Drive: 9 plays, 48 yards, 4:34.

Second quarter

- STL – Drew Bennett 16-yard pass from Gus Frerotte (Jeff Wilkins kick), 14:55. Rams 10–3. Drive: 9 plays, 76 yards, 4:02.
- ARI – Reggie Wells 0-yard fumble return (Neil Rackers kick), 3:32. Tied 10–10.
- STL – Jeff Wilkins 35-yard field goal, 0:18. Rams 13–10. Drive: 5 plays, 31 yards, 1:06.
- ARI – Kurt Warner 1-yard run (Neil Rackers kick), 0:00. Cardinals 17–13. Drive: 10 plays, 78 yards, 4:22.

Third quarter

- STL – Torry Holt 11-yard pass from Gus Frerotte (Jeff Wilkins kick), 11:44. Rams 20–17. Drive: 7 plays, 73 yards, 3:16.
- ARI – Neil Rackers 32-yard field goal, 1:40. Tied 20–20. Drive: 9 plays, 57 yards, 3:56.

Fourth quarter

- ARI – Roderick Hood 68-yard interception return (Neil Rackers kick), 13:47. Cardinals 27–20.
- STL – Jeff Wilkins 31-yard field goal, 8:46. Cardinals 27–23. Drive: 8 plays, 67 yards, 5:01.
- ARI – Larry Fitzgerald 7-yard pass from Kurt Warner (Neil Rackers kick), 3:11. Cardinals 34–23. Drive: 8 plays, 39 yards, 3:25.
- STL – Randy McMichael 29-yard pass from Gus Frerotte (Gus Frerotte–Torry Holt pass), 0:13. Cardinals 34–31. Drive: 9 plays, 79 yards, 2:58.

Top passers

- ARI – Kurt Warner – 14/28, 190 yards, TD, INT
- STL – Gus Frerotte – 24/43, 262 yards, 3 TD, 3 INT

Top rushers

- ARI – Edgerrin James – 26 rushes, 88 yards
- STL – Brian Leonard – 18 rushes, 102 yards

Top receivers

- ARI – Larry Fitzgerald – 9 receptions, 136 yards, TD
- STL – Torry Holt – 5 receptions, 89 yards, TD

Coming off their impressive home win over the Steelers, the Cardinals flew to the Edward Jones Dome for a Week 5 divisional duel with the winless St. Louis Rams. In the first quarter, Arizona trailed early with Rams kicker Jeff Wilkins getting a 46-yard field goal. The Cards would tie the game with kicker Neil Rackers getting a 50-yard field goal. In the second quarter, the Cardinals trailed again with QB Gus Frerotte completing a 16-yard TD pass to WR Drew Bennett. Arizona would tie the game with RB Edgerrin James fumbling at the 1-yard line and OG Reggie Wells recovering the fumble in the endzone for a touchdown. However, on the Cards next possession, QB Matt Leinart was sacked by MLB Will Witherspoon, causing his left collarbone to get broken, forcing him out for the rest of the game. Back-up QB Kurt Warner (former Rams QB) came in for the rest of the game. Afterwards, St. Louis would respond with Wilkins kicking a 35-yard field goal. Afterwards, Arizona would end the half with Warner getting a 1-yard TD run.

In the third quarter, the Rams retook the lead with Frerotte completing an 11-yard TD pass to WR Torry Holt. Afterwards, the Cards would tie the game with Rackers getting a 32-yard field goal. In the fourth quarter, the Cards increased their lead with CB Roderick Hood returning an interception 68 yards for a touchdown. St. Louis tried to pass the Cardinals for the lead as Wilkins got a 31-yard field goal, but Arizona increased its lead with Warner's 7-yard TD pass to WR Larry Fitzgerald. The Rams would get close with Frerotte's 29-yard TD pass to TE Randy McMichael, followed by a successful two-point conversion pass from Frerotte to Holt. The Cards would emerge victorious.

With the win, the Cardinals improved to 3–2.

=== Week 6: vs. Carolina Panthers ===
Week 6: Carolina Panthers at Arizona Cardinals – Game summary

Quarter	1	2	3	4	Total
Panthers	3	3	3	16	25
Cardinals	0	7	3	0	10

at University of Phoenix Stadium, Glendale, Arizona

- Date: October 14
- Game time: 1:05 p.m. MST
- Game weather: None (retractable roof closed)
- Game attendance: 64,403
- Referee: Walt Anderson
- TV announcers (Fox): Ron Pitts and Tony Boselli
- Box Score

Game information

First quarter

- CAR – John Kasay 33-yard field goal, 3:48. Panthers 3–0. Drive: 7 plays, 21 yards, 3:25.

Second quarter

- CAR – John Kasay 43-yard field goal, 14:50. Panthers 6–0. Drive: 7 plays, 34 yards, 2:20.
- ARI – Edgerrin James 23-yard run (Neil Rackers kick), 7:16. Cardinals 7–6. Drive: 12 plays, 80 yards, 7:34.

Third quarter

- CAR – John Kasay 24-yard field goal, 5:44. Panthers 9–7. Drive: 10 plays, 47 yards, 4:39.
- ARI – Neil Rackers 50-yard field goal, 3:20. Cardinals 10–9. Drive: 6 plays, 35 yards, 2:24.

Fourth quarter

- CAR – Steve Smith 65-yard pass from Vinny Testaverde (pass failed), 5:40. Panthers 15–10. Drive: 1 play, 90 yards, 0:12.
- CAR – John Kasay 45-yard field goal, 4:26. Panthers 18–10. Drive: 4 plays, 9 yards, 0:59.
- CAR – DeAngelo Williams 13-yard run (John Kasay kick), 2:04. Panthers 25–10. Drive: 4 plays, 89 yards, 1:12.

Top passers

- CAR – Vinny Testaverde – 20/33, 206 yards, TD
- ARI – Tim Rattay – 12/24, 159 yards, 3 INT

Top rushers

- CAR – DeAngelo Williams – 10 rushes, 121 yards, TD
- ARI – Edgerrin James – 21 rushes, 78 yards, TD

Top receivers

- CAR – Steve Smith – 10 receptions, 136 yards, TD
- ARI – Larry Fitzgerald – 6 receptions, 97 yards

Coming off their divisional road win over the Rams, the Cardinals went home for a Week 6 intraconference game against the Carolina Panthers and QB Vinny Testaverde, whom Arizona tried to sign for to back up Warner, yet failed. Backing up Warner for the remainder of the year would be QB Tim Rattay, whom the Cards recently signed.

In the first quarter, the Cardinals trailed early as Panthers kicker John Kasay kicked a 33-yard field goal for the only score of the period. In the second quarter, Arizona continued to trail as Kasay gave Carolina a 43-yard field goal. The Cards would take the lead with RB Edgerrin James getting a 23-yard TD run. In the third quarter, the Panthers jumped back in front again with Kasay getting a 24-yard field goal. Arizona would retake the lead with kicker Neil Rackers getting a 50-yard field goal. In the fourth quarter, the Cards lost control as Carolina took control with Testaverde completing a 65-yard TD pass to WR Steve Smith, Kasay nailing a 45-yard field goal, and RB DeAngelo Williams getting a 13-yard TD run.

With the loss, not only did the Cardinals fall to 3–3, but starting QB Kurt Warner (2/2 for 21 yards) left the game in the first quarter with a strained left elbow.

=== Week 7: at Washington Redskins ===
Week 7: Arizona Cardinals at Washington Redskins – Game summary

Quarter	1	2	3	4	Total
Cardinals	0	6	0	13	19
Redskins	7	7	7	0	21

at FedExField, Landover, Maryland

- Date: October 21
- Game time: 1:00 p.m. EDT/10:00 a.m. MST
- Game weather: Sunny, 75 °F (24 °C)
- Game attendance: 85,640
- Referee: Jeff Triplette
- TV announcers (Fox): Sam Rosen and Tim Ryan
- Box Score

Game information

First quarter

- WAS – Clinton Portis 2-yard run (Shaun Suisham kick), 4:12. Redskins 7–0. Drive: 8 plays, 25 yards, 4:20.

Second quarter

- WAS – London Fletcher 27-yard interception return (Shaun Suisham kick), 7:00. Redskins 14–0.
- ARI – Anquan Boldin 2-yard pass from Kurt Warner (kick failed), 0:00. Redskins 14–6. Drive: 6 plays, 23 yards, 1:46.

Third quarter

- WAS – Brett Favre 1-yard run (Shaun Suisham kick), 5:47. Redskins 21–6. Drive: 11 plays, 59 yards, 5:58.

Fourth quarter

- ARI – Anquan Boldin 10-yard pass from Kurt Warner (Neil Rackers kick), 14:52. Redskins 21–13. Drive: 12 plays, 72 yards, 5:55.
- ARI – Leonard Pope 1-yard pass from Tim Rattay (pass failed), 0:21. Redskins 21–19. Drive: 8 plays, 71 yards, 2:16.

Top passers

- ARI – Kurt Warner – 27/41, 282 yards, 2 TD, 2 INT
- WAS – Jason Campbell – 12/18, 95 yards, INT

Top rushers

- ARI – Edgerrin James – 27 rushes, 83 yards
- WAS – Clinton Portis – 18 rushes, 43 yards, 2 TD

Top receivers

- ARI – Larry Fitzgerald – 6 receptions, 97 yards
- WAS – Antwaan Randle El – 3 receptions, 54 yards

Hoping to rebound from their home loss to the Panthers, the Cardinals flew to FedExField for a Week 7 duel with former division rival Washington Redskins. QB Kurt Warner got the start, despite having a torn left elbow ligament.

In the first quarter, Arizona trailed early as Redskins RB Clinton Portis got a 2-yard TD run for the only score of the period. In the second quarter, things got worse for the Cards as Warner's second interception was returned by LB London Fletcher 27 yards for a touchdown. Arizona would finally respond as Warner threw a 2-yard TD pass to WR Anquan Boldin (with a failed PAT).

In the third quarter, the Cards continued to struggle as Portis gave Washington a 1-yard TD run for the only score of the period. In the fourth quarter, Arizona managed to draw close with Warner and Boldin hooking up with each other again on a 10-yard TD pass, along with back-up QB Tim Rattay completing a 1-yard TD pass to TE Leonard Pope (with a failed 2-point conversion). The Cards would recover their onside kick and got into position to attempt a game-winning 55-yard field goal from kicker Neil Rackers. The kick went wide left, securing their second-straight loss.

With the loss, the Cardinals entered their bye week at 3–4.

=== Week 9: at Tampa Bay Buccaneers ===
Week 9: Arizona Cardinals at Tampa Bay Buccaneers – Game summary

Quarter	1	2	3	4	Total
Cardinals	3	0	0	7	10
Buccaneers	7	3	7	0	17

at Raymond James Stadium, Tampa, Florida

- Date: November 4
- Game time: 1:00 p.m. EST/11:00 a.m. MST
- Game weather: Sunny, 78 °F (26 °C)
- Game attendance: 65,267
- Referee: Terry McAulay
- TV announcers (Fox): Ron Pitts and Tony Boselli
- Box Score

Game information

First quarter

- ARI – Neil Rackers 47-yard field goal, 12:17. Cardinals 3–0. Drive: 6 plays, 59 yards, 2:43.
- TB – Joey Galloway 37-yard pass from Jeff Garcia (Matt Bryant kick), 5:56. Buccaneers 7–3. Drive: 10 plays, 77 yards, 6:21.

Second quarter

- TB – Matt Bryant 32-yard field goal, 13:37. Buccaneers 10–3. Drive: 4 plays, 3 yards, 1:12.

Third quarter

- TB – Earnest Graham 2-yard run (Matt Bryant kick), 10:33. Buccaneers 17–3. Drive: 10 plays, 64 yards, 4:27.

Fourth quarter

- ARI – Edgerrin James 3-yard run (Neil Rackers kick), 7:30. Buccaneers 17–10. Drive: 11 plays, 80 yards, 4:17.

Top passers

- ARI – Kurt Warner – 10/30, 172 yards, 2 INT
- TB – Jeff Garcia – 18/28, 196 yards, TD

Top rushers

- ARI – Edgerrin James – 9 rushes, 15 yards, TD
- TB – Earnest Graham – 34 rushes, 124 yards, TD

Top receivers

- ARI – Larry Fitzgerald – 4 receptions, 95 yards
- TB – Joey Galloway – 9 receptions, 84 yards, TD

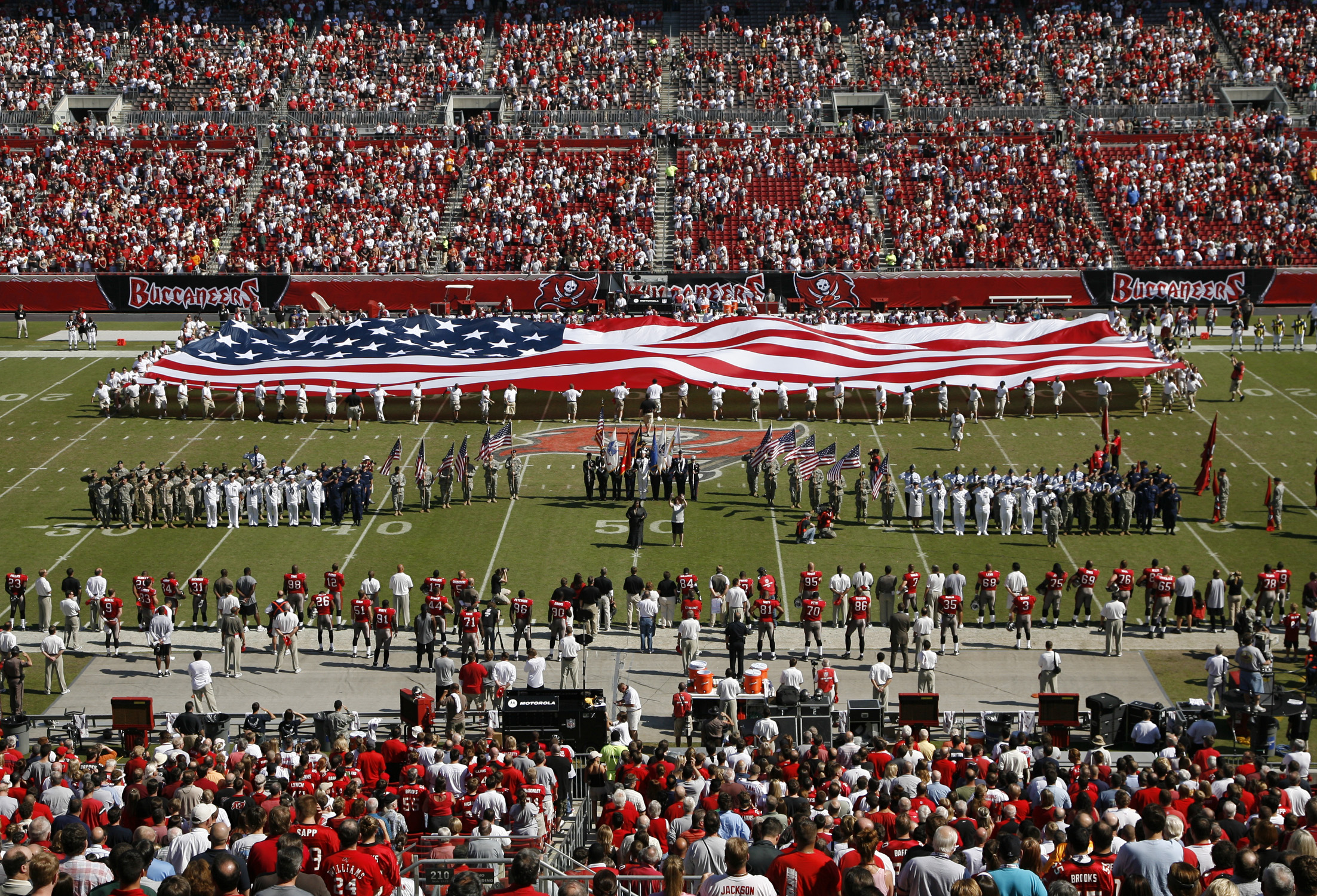
An American flag is unfurled on the field before the game at Tampa Bay

Coming off their bye week, the Cardinals flew to Raymond James Stadium for a Week 9 intraconference duel with the Tampa Bay Buccaneers. In the first quarter, the Cards flew first with kicker Neil Rackers getting a 47-yard field goal. However, the Buccaneers took the lead with QB Jeff Garcia completing a 37-yard TD pass to WR Joey Galloway. In the second quarter, Arizona continued to struggle as Tampa Bay kicker Matt Bryant nailed a 32-yard field goal for the only score of the period.

In the third quarter, the Cardinals continued to trail as Buccaneers RB Earnest Graham got a 2-yard TD run. In the fourth quarter, Arizona began to fight back as RB Edgerrin James got a 3-yard TD run. Late in the game, during the Cards last offensive drive, QB Kurt Warner would get intercepted by Safety Jermaine Phillips. Even though replays clearly showed that he didn't stay in bounds, Arizona was out of timeouts and therefore were unable to challenge the play. It would be remembered as the most controversial call in 2007.

With the loss, the Cardinals fell to 3–5.

=== Week 10: vs. Detroit Lions ===
Week 10: Detroit Lions at Arizona Cardinals – Game summary

Quarter	1	2	3	4	Total
Lions	7	0	7	7	21
Cardinals	3	14	7	7	31

at University of Phoenix Stadium, Glendale, Arizona

- Date: November 11
- Game time: 2:15 p.m. MST
- Game weather: None (retractable roof closed)
- Game attendance: 64,753
- Referee: Walt Coleman
- TV announcers (Fox): Ron Pitts and Tony Boselli
- Box Score

Game information

First quarter

- DET – Kevin Jones 4-yard run (Jason Hanson kick), 10:29. Lions 7–0. Drive: 3 plays, 25 yards, 0:41.
- ARI – Neil Rackers 23-yard field goal, 2:47. Lions 7–3. Drive: 7 plays, 8 yards, 2:58.

Second quarter

- ARI – Larry Fitzgerald 1-yard pass from Kurt Warner (Neil Rackers kick), 7:00. Cardinals 10–7. Drive: 3 plays, 13 yards, 1:18.
- ARI – Leonard Pope 2-yard pass from Tim Rattay (Neil Rackers kick), 0:18. Cardinals 17–7. Drive: 15 plays, 90 yards, 5:11.

Third quarter

- ARI – Leonard Pope 16-yard pass from Kurt Warner (Neil Rackers kick), 7:31. Cardinals 24–7. Drive: 5 plays, 51 yards, 2:23.
- DET – Roy Williams 7-yard pass from Jon Kitna (Jason Hanson kick), 2:52. Cardinals 24–14. Drive: 7 plays, 67 yards, 4:39.

Fourth quarter

- ARI – Larry Fitzgerald 20-yard pass from Kurt Warner (Neil Rackers kick), 13:23. Cardinals 31–14. Drive: 3 plays, 36 yards, 1:37.
- DET – Roy Williams 7-yard pass from Jon Kitna (Jason Hanson kick), 1:15. Cardinals 31–21. Drive: 9 plays, 63 yards, 2:02.

Top passers

- DET – Jon Kitna – 32/45, 296 yards, 2 TD, 2 INT
- ARI – Kurt Warner – 26/36, 259 yards, 3 TD, INT

Top rushers

- DET – Aveion Cason – 1 rush, 1 yard
- ARI – Edgerrin James – 18 rushes, 60 yards

Top receivers

- DET – Shaun McDonald – 6 receptions, 73 yards
- ARI – Larry Fitzgerald – 8 receptions, 74 yards, 2 TD

Trying to snap a three-game losing skid, the Cardinals went home for a Week 10 duel with the Detroit Lions. In the first quarter, Arizona trailed early as Lions RB Kevin Jones got a 4-yard TD run. The Cards would reply with kicker Neil Rackers nailing a 23-yard field goal. In the second quarter, the Cardinals took the lead with QB Kurt Warner completing a 1-yard TD pass to WR Larry Fitzgerald, while back-up QB Tim Rattay completed a 2-yard TD pass to TE Leonard Pope.

In the third quarter, Arizona continued its scorching as Warner completed a 16-yard TD pass to Pope. Detroit would respond with Kitna completing a 7-yard TD pass to WR Roy Williams. In the fourth quarter, the Cards pulled away with Warner and Fitzgerald hooking up with each other again on a 20-yard TD pass. The Lions' last score would be another 7-yard TD pass from Kitna to Williams.

With the win, the Cardinals improved to 4–5.

=== Week 11: at Cincinnati Bengals ===
Week 11: Arizona Cardinals at Cincinnati Bengals – Game summary

Quarter	1	2	3	4	Total
Cardinals	7	14	14	0	35
Bengals	7	6	14	0	27

at Paul Brown Stadium, Cincinnati, Ohio

- Date: November 18
- Game time: 1:00 p.m. EST/11:00 a.m. MST
- Game weather: Cloudy, 44 °F (7 °C)
- Game attendance: 65,403
- Referee: Ron Winter
- TV announcers (Fox): Sam Rosen and Tim Ryan
- Box Score

Game information

First quarter

- CIN – T.J. Houshmandzadeh 19-yard pass from Carson Palmer (Shayne Graham kick), 5:56. Bengals 7–0. Drive: 5 plays, 36 yards, 2:23.
- ARI – Antrel Rolle 55-yard interception return (Neil Rackers kick), 4:59. Tied 7–7.

Second quarter

- CIN – Shayne Graham 41-yard field goal, 13:37. Bengals 10–7. Drive: 12 plays, 44 yards, 5:25.
- ARI – Anquan Boldin 44-yard pass from Kurt Warner (Neil Rackers kick), 5:56. Cardinals 14–10. Drive: 4 plays, 68 yards, 1:49.
- CIN – Shayne Graham 38-yard field goal, 13:37. Cardinals 14–13. Drive: 13 plays, 60 yards, 6:30.
- ARI – Larry Fitzgerald 5-yard pass from Kurt Warner (Neil Rackers kick), 5:56. Cardinals 21–13. Drive: 9 plays, 85 yards, 4:15.

Third quarter

- ARI – Edgerrin James 3-yard run (Neil Rackers kick), 10:33. Cardinals 28–13. Drive: 4 plays, 24 yards, 1:41.
- CIN – Chris Henry 37-yard pass from Carson Palmer (Shayne Graham kick), 5:56. Cardinals 28–20. Drive: 4 plays, 60 yards, 1:31.
- CIN – DeDe Dorsey 19-yard blocked punt return (Shayne Graham kick), 4:59. Cardinals 28–27.
- ARI – Antrel Rolle 54-yard interception return (Neil Rackers kick), 4:59. Cardinals 35–27.

Fourth quarter

- No scoring plays

Top passers

- ARI – Kurt Warner – 16/28, 211 yards, 2 TD
- CIN – Carson Palmer – 37/52, 329 yards, 2 TD, 4 INT

Top rushers

- ARI – Edgerrin James – 22 rushes, 52 yards, TD
- CIN – Kenny Watson – 9 rushes, 45 yards

Top receivers

- ARI – Larry Fitzgerald – 8 receptions, 93 yards, TD
- CIN – T.J. Houshmandzadeh – 8 receptions, 87 yards, TD

Coming off their home win over the Lions, the Cardinals flew to Paul Brown Stadium for a Week 11 interconference duel with the Cincinnati Bengals. In the first quarter, the Cards trailed early as Bengals QB Carson Palmer completing a 19-yard TD pass to WR T.J. Houshmandzadeh. Arizona responded via CB Antrel Rolle returning an interception 55 yards for a touchdown. In the second quarter, the Bengals responded with kicker Shayne Graham getting a 41-yard field goal. The Cardinals would take the lead with QB Kurt Warner completing a 44-yard TD pass to WR Anquan Boldin. Cincinnati tried to reply as Graham kicked a 38-yard field goal. Arizona answered with Warner completing a 5-yard TD pass to WR Larry Fitzgerald.

In the third quarter, the Cards increased their lead with RB Edgerrin James getting a 3-yard TD run. The Bengals tried to come back as Palmer completed a 37-yard to WR Chris Henry, while RB DeDe Dorsey returning a blocked punt 19 yards for a touchdown. Arizona held to win as Rolle returned his second interception 54 yards for a touchdown.

With the win, the Cardinals improved to 5–5.

Antrel Rolle, who had three interceptions, returning two of them for touchdowns, became the 18th player in NFL history to have three interceptions in one game. In all, the Cardinals forced 5 turnovers and intercepted 4 passes from Palmer.

=== Week 12: vs. San Francisco 49ers ===
Week 12: San Francisco 49ers at Arizona Cardinals – Game summary

Quarter	1	2	3	4	OT	Total
49ers	7	10	7	7	6	37
Cardinals	7	14	0	10	0	31

at University of Phoenix Stadium, Glendale, Arizona

- Date: November 25
- Game time: 2:05 p.m. MST
- Game weather: 65 °F (18 °C) (retractable roof open)
- Game attendance: 64,483
- Referee: Gerry Austin
- TV announcers (Fox): Ron Pitts and Tony Boselli
- Box Score

Game information

First quarter

- ARI – Larry Fitzgerald 28-yard pass from Kurt Warner (Neil Rackers kick), 10:28. Cardinals 7–0. Drive: 8 plays, 92 yards, 4:32.
- SF – Vernon Davis 2-yard pass from Trent Dilfer (Joe Nedney kick), 0:36. Tied 7–7. Drive: 8 plays, 32 yards, 4:14.

Second quarter

- SF – Joe Nedney 19-yard field goal, 11:21. 49ers 10–7. Drive: 6 plays, 18 yards, 2:42.
- SF – Frank Gore 11-yard run (Joe Nedney kick), 10:22. 49ers 17–7. Drive: 2 plays, 6 yards, 0:36.
- ARI – Marcel Shipp 1-yard run (Neil Rackers kick), 5:59. 49ers 17–14. Drive: 7 plays, 59 yards, 4:23.
- ARI – Larry Fitzgerald 48-yard pass from Kurt Warner (Neil Rackers kick), 0:00. Cardinals 21–17. Drive: 2 plays, 55 yards, 0:06.

Third quarter

- SF – Arnaz Battle 57-yard pass from Trent Dilfer (Joe Nedney kick), 5:47. 49ers 24–21. Drive: 4 plays, 88 yards, 2:10.

Fourth quarter

- ARI – Ben Patrick 2-yard pass from Tim Rattay (Neil Rackers kick), 9:53. Cardinals 28–24. Drive: 7 plays, 65 yards, 4:11.
- SF – Frank Gore 35-yard run (Joe Nedney kick), 1:15. 49ers 31–28. Drive: 6 plays, 70 yards, 3:18.
- ARI – Neil Rackers 19-yard field goal, 0:00. Tied 31–31. Drive: 7 plays, 84 yards, 1:15.

Overtime

- SF – Tully Banta-Cain 0-yard fumble return, 4:56. 49ers 37–31.

Top passers

- SF – Trent Dilfer – 25/39, 256 yards, 2 TD
- ARI – Kurt Warner – 34/48, 484 yards, 2 TD, 2 INT

Top rushers

- SF – Frank Gore – 21 rushes, 116 yards, 2 TD
- ARI – Edgerrin James – 17 rushes, 78 yards

Top receivers

- SF – Frank Gore – 11 receptions, 98 yards
- ARI – Larry Fitzgerald – 9 receptions, 156 yards, 2 TD

Coming off an impressive road win over the Bengals, the Cardinals went home for a Week 12 NFC West rematch with the San Francisco 49ers. In the first quarter, the Cards took flight early as QB Kurt Warner completed a 28-yard touchdown reception to WR Larry Fitzgerald. The 49ers responded with QB Trent Dilfer completing a 2-yard TD pass to TE Vernon Davis. In the second quarter, San Francisco took the lead via kicker Joe Nedney hitting a 19-yard field goal and running back Frank Gore getting an 11-yard TD run. Afterwards, Arizona regained the lead with RB Marcel Shipp getting a 1-yard TD run & Warner hooking up with Fitzgerald again on a 48-yard TD run.

However, in the third quarter, the 49ers retook the lead with Dilfer completing a 57-yard TD pass to WR Arnaz Battle for the only score of the period. In the fourth quarter, the Cardinals regained the lead with QB Tim Rattay completing a 2-yard TD pass to rookie TE Ben Patrick. Afterwards, San Francisco got the lead again with Gore getting a 35-yard TD run. Then, the Cards tied the game with kicker Neil Rackers getting a 19-yard field goal. In overtime, Arizona had a chance to win the game with a 32-yard field goal. The kick was good, but a delay of game penalty wiped it away. On the second try, Rackers missed it wide left. In the end, the 49ers got the win with Warner fumbling the ball after getting hit in his endzone and LB Tully Banta-Cain falling on it for the touchdown and the win.

With the loss, the Cardinals fell to 5–6, despite Warner throwing a career-best 484 yards.

=== Week 13: vs. Cleveland Browns ===
Week 13: Cleveland Browns at Arizona Cardinals – Game summary

Quarter	1	2	3	4	Total
Browns	3	7	8	3	21
Cardinals	14	0	7	6	27

at University of Phoenix Stadium, Glendale, Arizona

- Date: December 2
- Game time: 2:05 p.m. MST
- Game weather: Sunny, 62 °F (17 °C) (retractable roof open)
- Game attendance: 64,791
- Referee: Jerome Boger
- TV announcers (CBS): Craig Bolerjack and Dan Dierdorf
- Box Score

Game information

First quarter

- ARI – Roderick Hood 71-yard interception return (Neil Rackers kick), 10:45. Cardinals 7–0.
- ARI – Leonard Pope 5-yard pass from Kurt Warner (Neil Rackers kick), 4:59. Cardinals 14–0. Drive: 7 plays, 43 yards, 3:38.
- CLE – Phil Dawson 37-yard field goal, 1:41. Cardinals 14–3. Drive: 8 plays, 64 yards, 3:18.

Second quarter

- CLE – Jamal Lewis 6-yard pass from Derek Anderson (Phil Dawson kick), 1:14. Cardinals 14–10. Drive: 10 plays, 80 yards, 6:01.

Third quarter

- ARI – Bryant Johnson 1-yard pass from Kurt Warner (Neil Rackers kick), 0:43. Cardinals 21–10. Drive: 8 plays, 22 yards, 3:03.
- CLE – Braylon Edwards 67-yard pass from Derek Anderson (Josh Cribbs–Kellen Winslow pass), 0:00. Cardinals 21–18. Drive: 2 plays, 69 yards, 0:43.

Fourth quarter

- ARI – Neil Rackers 33-yard field goal, 12:10. Cardinals 24–18. Drive: 6 plays, 25 yards, 2:50.
- CLE – Phil Dawson 22-yard field goal, 6:17. Cardinals 24–21. Drive: 6 plays, 49 yards, 2:59.
- ARI – Neil Rackers 19-yard field goal, 1:48. Cardinals 27–21. Drive: 11 plays, 79 yards, 4:29.

Top passers

- CLE – Derek Anderson – 21/41, 304 yards, 2 TD, 2 INT
- ARI – Kurt Warner – 18/30, 169 yards, 2 TD, INT

Top rushers

- CLE – Jamal Lewis – 16 rushes, 62 yards
- ARI – Edgerrin James – 24 rushes, 114 yards

Top receivers

- CLE – Braylon Edwards – 7 receptions, 149 yards, TD
- ARI – Bryant Johnson – 6 receptions, 56 yards, TD

Hoping to rebound from their tough divisional home loss to the 49ers, the Cardinals stayed at home for a Week 13 interconference duel with the Cleveland Browns. In the first quarter, Arizona jumped out to an early lead as CB Roderick Hood returned an interception 71 yards for a touchdown, along with QB Kurt Warner's 5-yard TD pass to TE Leonard Pope. The Browns would get on the board with kicker Phil Dawson getting a 37-yard field goal. In the second quarter, Cleveland drew close as QB Derek Anderson completed a 6-yard TD pass to RB Jamal Lewis for the only score of the period.

In the third quarter, the Cards responded with Warner completing a 1-yard TD pass to WR Bryant Johnson. However, the Browns drew closer as Anderson completed a 67-yard TD pass to WR Braylon Edwards (with WR/KR/PR Joshua Cribbs completing a 2-point conversion pass to TE Kellen Winslow). In the fourth quarter, Arizona added on to its lead with kicker Neil Rackers getting a 33-yard field goal, while Dawson gave Cleveland a 22-yard field goal. Afterwards, the Cards increased its lead with Rackers nailing a 19-yard field goal. However, the Browns had one final shot towards the end zone. Anderson's pass to Winslow ended up being caught out of bounds. Replays seemed to indicate Winslow was forced out, which would have been good for a touchdown had it been called on the field. But force-outs are not reviewable, so the touchdown did not count and the Cardinals survived.

With the win, the Cardinals improved to 6–6.

=== Week 14: at Seattle Seahawks ===
Week 14: Arizona Cardinals at Seattle Seahawks – Game summary

Quarter	1	2	3	4	Total
Cardinals	0	7	7	7	21
Seahawks	10	17	0	15	42

at Qwest Field, Seattle, Washington

- Date: December 9
- Game time: 1:05 p.m. PST/2:05 p.m. MST
- Game weather: Cloudy, 35 °F (2 °C)
- Game attendance: 68,193
- Referee: Tony Corrente
- TV announcers (Fox): Sam Rosen, Tim Ryan and Chris Myers
- Box Score

Game information

First quarter

- SEA – Josh Brown 23-yard field goal, 8:51. Seahawks 3–0. Drive: 7 plays, 28 yards, 3:09.
- SEA – Nate Burleson 7-yard pass from Matt Hasselbeck (Josh Brown kick), 0:46. Seahawks 10–0. Drive: 9 plays, 79 yards, 5:04.

Second quarter

- SEA – Bobby Engram 15-yard pass from Matt Hasselbeck (Josh Brown kick), 11:47. Seahawks 17–0. Drive: 4 plays, 59 yards, 1:39.
- SEA – Deion Branch 17-yard pass from Matt Hasselbeck (Josh Brown kick), 7:44. Seahawks 24–0. Drive: 4 plays, 58 yards, 2:01.
- ARI – Bryant Johnson 5-yard pass from Kurt Warner (Neil Rackers kick), 1:04. Seahawks 24–7. Drive: 5 plays, 26 yards, 1:46.
- SEA – Josh Brown 41-yard field goal, 0:02. Seahawks 27–7. Drive: 7 plays, 36 yards, 1:02.

Third quarter

- ARI – Jerheme Urban 2-yard pass from Kurt Warner (Neil Rackers kick), 0:57. Seahawks 27–14. Drive: 13 plays, 83 yards, 6:43.

Fourth quarter

- SEA – Marcus Pollard 3-yard pass from Matt Hasselbeck (Josh Brown kick), 10:42. Seahawks 34–14. Drive: 11 plays, 62 yards, 5:07.
- SEA – Team safety, 9:25. Seahawks 36–14.
- SEA – Marcus Trufant 84-yard interception return (kick failed), 5:29. Seahawks 42–14.
- ARI – Larry Fitzgerald 11-yard pass from Kurt Warner (Neil Rackers kick), 2:27. Seahawks 42–21. Drive: 6 plays, 70 yards, 3:02.

Top passers

- ARI – Kurt Warner – 28/46, 337 yards, 3 TD, 5 INT
- SEA – Matt Hasselbeck – 22/33, 272 yards, 4 TD

Top rushers

- ARI – Edgerrin James – 13 rushes, 46 yards
- SEA – Shaun Alexander – 10 rushes, 38 yards

Top receivers

- ARI – Jerheme Urban – 6 receptions, 123 yards, TD
- SEA – Leonard Weaver – 4 receptions, 56 yards

Coming off their home win over the Browns, the Cardinals flew to Qwest Field for a Week 14 NFC West rematch with the Seattle Seahawks. In the first quarter, Arizona trailed early as Seahawks kicker Josh Brown managed to get a 23-yard field goal, along with QB Matt Hasselbeck completing a 7-yard TD pass to WR Nate Burleson. In the second quarter, the Cards continued to trail as Hasselbeck completed a 15-yard TD pass to WR Bobby Engram and a 17-yard TD pass to WR Deion Branch. The Cardinals would get on the board as QB Kurt Warner completed a 5-yard TD pass to WR Bryant Johnson, yet Seattle increased their lead prior to halftime with Brown kicking a 41-yard field goal.

In the third quarter, the Cards tried to rally as Warner completed a 2-yard TD pass to WR Jerheme Urban for the only score of the period. However, in the fourth quarter, the Seahawks pulled away as Hasselbeck completed a 3-yard TD pass to TE Marcus Pollard, RB Josh Scobey tackling Cardinals punter Mitch Berger in the end zone for a safety, and CB Marcus Trufant returning an interception 84 yards for a touchdown (with a failed PAT). Arizona tried to come back as Warner completed an 11-yard TD pass to WR Larry Fitzgerald. However, Seattle's defense was too much to overcome.

With the loss, the Cardinals fell to 6–7.

During this game, Kurt Warner threw a career-worst five interceptions.

=== Week 15: at New Orleans Saints ===
Week 15: Arizona Cardinals at New Orleans Saints – Game summary

Quarter	1	2	3	4	Total
Cardinals	7	7	7	3	24
Saints	7	14	10	0	31

at Louisiana Superdome, New Orleans, Louisiana

- Date: December 16
- Game time: 12:00 p.m. CST/11:00 a.m. MST
- Game weather: None (indoor stadium)
- Game attendance: 70,007
- Referee: Ed Hochuli
- TV announcers (Fox): Ron Pitts and Tony Boselli
- Box Score

Game information

First quarter

- ARI – Troy Bienemann 1-yard pass from Kurt Warner (Neil Rackers kick), 12:00. Cardinals 7–0. Drive: 4 plays, 8 yards, 2:11.
- NO – Marques Colston 19-yard pass from Drew Brees (Martin Gramatica kick), 6:18. Tied 7–7. Drive: 11 plays, 81 yards, 5:42.

Second quarter

- NO – Aaron Stecker 1-yard run (Martin Gramatica kick), 13:47. Saints 14–7. Drive: 13 plays, 74 yards, 6:11.
- ARI – Larry Fitzgerald 18-yard pass from Kurt Warner (Neil Rackers kick), 10:01. Tied 14–14. Drive: 7 plays, 66 yards, 3:46.
- NO – David Patten 32-yard pass from Drew Brees (Martin Gramatica kick), 1:56. Saints 21–14. Drive: 4 plays, 55 yards, 1:24.

Third quarter

- NO – Aaron Stecker 6-yard run (Martin Gramatica kick), 12:02. Saints 28–14. Drive: 10 plays, 80 yards, 5:48.
- ARI – Ben Patrick 3-yard pass from Kurt Warner (Neil Rackers kick), 6:14. Saints 28–21. Drive: 10 plays, 80 yards, 5:48.
- NO – Martin Gramatica 31-yard field goal, 0:50. Saints 31–21. Drive: 11 plays, 70 yards, 6:39.

Fourth quarter

- ARI – Neil Rackers 26-yard field goal, 9:11. Saints 31–24. Drive: 9 plays, 32 yards, 3:28.

Top passers

- ARI – Kurt Warner – 19/30, 233 yards, 3 TD, INT
- NO – Drew Brees – 26/30, 315 yards, 2 TD

Top rushers

- ARI – Edgerrin James – 16 rushes, 84 yards
- NO – Aaron Stecker – 22 rushes, 95 yards, 2 TD

Top receivers

- ARI – Anquan Boldin – 6 receptions, 83 yards
- NO – Marques Colston – 8 receptions, 114 yards, TD

Hoping to recover from their divisional road loss to the Seahawks, the Cardinals flew to the Louisiana Superdome for a Week 15 intraconference duel with the New Orleans Saints. In the first quarter, the Cardinals took flight as QB Kurt Warner completed a 1-yard TD pass to TE Troy Bienemann. The Saints responded with QB Drew Brees completing a 19-yard TD pass to WR Marques Colston. In the second quarter, Arizona trailed as RB Aaron Stecker got a 1-yard TD run. The Cardinals would tie the game Warner completing an 18-yard TD pass to WR Larry Fitzgerald. However, New Orleans took the lead with Brees completing a 32-yard TD pass to WR David Patten.

In the third quarter, the Saints increased their lead as RB Aaron Stecker managed to get a 6-yard TD run. The Cards would sneak closer as Warner completed a 3-yard TD pass to rookie TE Ben Patrick. However, New Orleans answered with kicker Martín Gramática getting a 31-yard field goal. In the fourth quarter, Arizona tried to mount a comeback as kicker Neil Rackers nailed a 26-yard field goal. However, the Saints defense was too much to overcome.

The Cardinals were officially eliminated from playoff contention the next day, after the Minnesota Vikings defeated the Chicago Bears, meaning again that the home team hosting the Super Bowl would not be participating therein.

With the loss, the Cardinals fell to 6–8.

=== Week 16: vs. Atlanta Falcons ===
Week 16: Atlanta Falcons at Arizona Cardinals – Game summary

Quarter	1	2	3	4	OT	Total
Falcons	7	7	0	13	0	27
Cardinals	7	17	0	3	3	30

at University of Phoenix Stadium, Glendale, Arizona

- Date: December 23
- Game time: 2:05 p.m. MST
- Game weather: (retractable roof open)
- Game attendance: 64,159
- Referee: Scott Green
- TV announcers (Fox): Ron Pitts and Tony Boselli
- Box Score

Game information

First quarter

- ARI – Anquan Boldin 4-yard pass from Kurt Warner (Neil Rackers kick), 4:14. Cardinals 7–0. Drive: 10 plays, 80 yards, 5:14.
- ATL – Jason Snelling 1-yard run (Morten Andersen kick), 1:01. Tied 7–7. Drive: 9 plays, 74 yards, 3:13.

Second quarter

- ARI – Anquan Boldin 13-yard pass from Kurt Warner (Neil Rackers kick), 8:10. Cardinals 14–7. Drive: 8 plays, 45 yards, 4:35.
- ATL – Laurent Robinson 74-yard pass from Chris Redman (Morten Andersen kick), 7:54. Tied 14–14. Drive: 1 play, 74 yards, 0:16.
- ARI – Neil Rackers 32-yard field goal, 4:01. Cardinals 17–14. Drive: 8 plays, 36 yards, 3:53.
- ARI – J.J. Arrington 4-yard pass from Kurt Warner (Neil Rackers kick), 0:16. Cardinals 24–14. Drive: 10 plays, 53 yards, 2:16.

Third quarter

- No scoring plays

Fourth quarter

- ATL – Morten Andersen 23-yard field goal, 8:52. Cardinals 24–17. Drive: 16 plays, 83 yards, 7:09.
- ATL – Alge Crumpler 7-yard pass from Chris Redman (Morten Andersen kick), 4:45. Tied 24–24. Drive: 8 plays, 48 yards, 3:02.
- ATL – Morten Andersen 21-yard field goal, 1:38. Falcons 27–24. Drive: 8 plays, 56 yards, 1:22.
- ARI – Neil Rackers 29-yard field goal, 0:00. Tied 27–27. Drive: 9 plays, 63 yards, 1:38.

Overtime

- ARI – Neil Rackers 31-yard field goal, 9:30. Cardinals 30–27. Drive: 10 plays, 58 yards, 5:30.

Top passers

- ATL – Chris Redman – 28/42, 315 yards, 2 TD, INT
- ARI – Kurt Warner – 35/52, 369 yards, 3 TD

Top rushers

- ATL – Travis Williams – 1 rush, 37 yards
- ARI – Edgerrin James – 26 rushes, 68 yards

Top receivers

- ATL – Roddy White – 12 receptions, 141 yards
- ARI – Anquan Boldin – 13 receptions, 162 yards, 2 TD

With the win, the Cardinals improved to 7–8.

=== Week 17: vs. St. Louis Rams ===
Week 17: St. Louis Rams at Arizona Cardinals – Game summary

Quarter	1	2	3	4	Total
Rams	3	3	13	0	19
Cardinals	3	21	7	17	48

at University of Phoenix Stadium, Glendale, Arizona

- Date: December 30
- Game time: 2:15 p.m. MST
- Game weather: (retractable roof open)
- Game attendance: 64,671
- Referee: Jeff Triplette
- TV announcers (Fox): Matt Vasgersian and Terry Donahue
- Box Score

Game information

First quarter

- STL – Jeff Wilkins 37-yard field goal, 10:26. Rams 3–0. Drive: 8 plays, 53 yards, 4:34.
- ARI – Neil Rackers 23-yard field goal, 4:27. Tied 3–3. Drive: 15 plays, 75 yards, 5:59.

Second quarter

- ARI – Edgerrin James 2-yard run (Neil Rackers kick), 7:45. Cardinals 10–3. Drive: 8 plays, 57 yards, 3:24.
- ARI – Antrel Rolle 47-yard interception return (Neil Rackers kick), 6:40. Cardinals 17–3.
- ARI – Larry Fitzgerald 21-yard pass from Kurt Warner (Neil Rackers kick), 1:06. Cardinals 24–3. Drive: 8 plays, 64 yards, 3:58.
- STL – Jeff Wilkins 42-yard field goal, 0:09. Cardinals 24–6. Drive: 9 plays, 57 yards, 0:57.

Third quarter

- STL – Joe Klopfenstein 36-yard pass from Marc Bulger (Jeff Wilkins kick), 12:42. Cardinals 24–13. Drive: 2 plays, 37 yards, 0:41.
- ARI – Larry Fitzgerald 6-yard pass from Kurt Warner (Neil Rackers kick), 5:45. Cardinals 31–13. Drive: 12 plays, 80 yards, 6:57.
- STL – O.J. Atogwe 52-yard interception return (pass failed), 1:48. Cardinals 31–19.

Fourth quarter

- ARI – Anquan Boldin 20-yard pass from Kurt Warner (Neil Rackers kick), 13:37. Cardinals 38–19. Drive: 6 plays, 71 yards, 3:11.
- ARI – Neil Rackers 33-yard field goal, 3:57. Cardinals 45–19. Drive: 8 plays, 25 yards, 4:44.
- ARI – Gerald Hayes 30-yard interception return (Neil Rackers kick), 3:09. Cardinals 48–19.

Top passers

- STL – Marc Bulger – 13/25, 176 yards, TD, 2 INT
- ARI – Kurt Warner – 23/39, 300 yards, 3 TD, 2 INT

Top rushers

- STL – Steven Jackson – 18 rushes, 55 yards
- ARI – Edgerrin James – 24 rushes, 102 yards, TD

Top receivers

- STL – Torry Holt – 7 receptions, 93 yards
- ARI – Larry Fitzgerald – 11 receptions, 171 yards, 2 TD

With the win, the Cardinals improved to 8–8. The 29-point victory allowed the Cardinals to finish the season with a positive point differential (404 scored, 399 allowed) for the first time since 1993.
