= Adrian Wilson (American football) =

American football player and executive (born 1979)

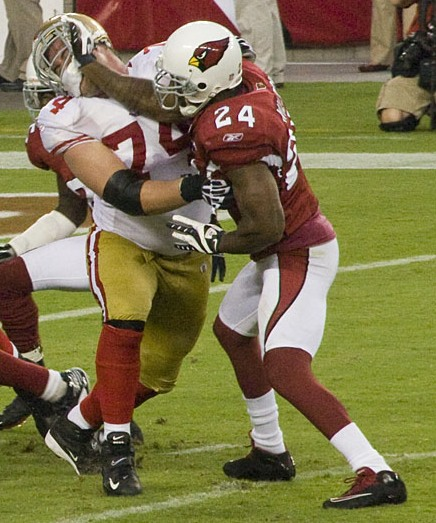
- Wilson playing for the Arizona Cardinals in 2009

No. 22, 24
- Position: Safety

Personal information
- Born: October 12, 1979 (age 47); High Point, North Carolina, U.S.
- Listed height: 6 ft 3 in (1.91 m)
- Listed weight: 230 lb (104 kg)

Career information
- High school: T. Wingate Andrews (High Point)
- College: NC State (1998–2000)
- NFL draft: 2001: 3rd round, 64th overall pick

Career history

Playing
- Arizona Cardinals (2001–2012); New England Patriots (2013); Chicago Bears (2014)*
- * Offseason or practice squad member only

Operations
- Arizona Cardinals (2015–2018) Regional scout; Arizona Cardinals (2019–2020) Director of pro scouting; Arizona Cardinals (2021–2022) VP of pro scouting; Carolina Panthers (2023–2024) VP of player personnel

Awards and highlights
- As a player: First-team All-Pro (2009); 2× Second-team All-Pro (2006, 2008); 5× Pro Bowl (2006, 2008–2011); Arizona Cardinals Ring of Honor; Second-team All-ACC (2000)

Career NFL statistics
- Total tackles: 903
- Sacks: 25.5
- Forced fumbles: 16
- Fumble recoveries: 8
- Pass deflections: 99
- Interceptions: 27
- Defensive touchdowns: 4
- Stats at Pro Football Reference
- Executive profile at Pro Football Reference

Adrian Lemar Wilson (born October 12, 1979) is an American former professional football player who was a safety in the National Football League (NFL). Wilson played college football for the NC State Wolfpack and was selected by the Arizona Cardinals in the third round of the 2001 NFL draft. He also played in the NFL for the New England Patriots and the Chicago Bears.

After his playing career, Wilson joined the Cardinals as a regional scout and served as a member of their personnel department from 2015 to 2022. Wilson parted ways with the team in February 2023 though for a new opportunity in the Carolina Panthers front office.

== Playing career ==
=== College ===
Wilson attended North Carolina State University, where he was a two-year starter at strong safety for the NC State Wolfpack football team. In 33 games (and 23 starts) with the Wolfpack, he posted 254 total tackles (144 solo tackles, 11 tackles-for-losses), 11 pass deflections and 3 passes intercepted. His 248 total tackles was the most by an NC State defensive back since James Walker collected 289 stops from 1993 to 1995. At the end of his junior year, Wilson decided to forgo his senior season and enter the 2001 NFL draft.

=== National Football League ===
Pre-draft measurables
Height	Weight	Arm length	Hand span	40-yard dash	10-yard split	20-yard split	Vertical jump	Broad jump	Bench press
6 ft 2 3/8 in (1.89 m)	213 lb (97 kg)	32 in (0.81 m)	8 in (0.20 m)	4.52 s	1.61 s	2.65 s	39.5 in (1.00 m)	10 ft 0 in (3.05 m)	21 reps
All values from NFL Combine

==== Arizona Cardinals ====
The Arizona Cardinals selected Wilson in the third round (64th overall) of the 2001 NFL draft. Wilson was the sixth safety drafted in 2001.

==== 2001 ====
On July 25, 2001, the Arizona Cardinals signed Wilson to a three-year, $1.53 million contract that includes a signing bonus of $525,000.

Throughout training camp, Wilson competed to be the starting strong safety against Pat Tillman and Justin Lucas. Head coach Dave McGinnis named Wilson the backup strong safety to start the regular season, behind Pat Tillman.

He made his professional regular season debut in the Arizona Cardinals' season-opener against the Denver Broncos and made two combined tackles in their 38–17 loss. On October 28, 2001, Wilson deflected a pass and made his first career interception off a pass by Clint Stoerner during a 17–3 loss at the Dallas Cowboys in Week 7. The following week, Wilson recorded two combined tackles, broke up a pass, and was credited with half a sack on quarterback Donovan McNabb during a 21–7 loss against the Philadelphia Eagles in Week 8. The sack was the first one of his career. In Week 16, he collected a season-high seven combined tackles and a pass deflection in the Cardinals' 30–7 victory at the Carolina Panthers. On January 6, 2002, Wilson broke up a pass and returned an interception by quarterback Tony Banks for a 61-yard touchdown in a 20–17 loss at the Washington Redskins in Week 17. The pick six marked the first touchdown of his career. He finished his rookie season in 2001 with 32 combined tackles (24 solo), six passes defensed, two interceptions, a touchdown, and was credited with a half a sack in 16 games and zero starts.

==== 2002 ====
Wilson entered training camp slated as the starting strong safety after the role was left vacant by the departure of Pat Tillman. Head coach Dave McGinnis named Wilson the starting strong safety to start the season, alongside free safety Kwamie Lassiter.

Wilson was inactive for the Arizona Cardinals' season-opener at the Washington Redskins after injuring his shoulder during the preseason. On September 15, 2002, Wilson earned his first career start and recorded three solo tackles during a 24–13 win at the Seattle Seahawks in Week 2. On October 20, 2002, Wilson collected eight combined tackles, deflected three passes, made a season-high three interceptions, and recorded his first career sack in the Cardinals' 9–6 victory against the Dallas Cowboys in Week 7. He intercepted three pass attempts and made his first career sack on quarterback Quincy Carter. In Week 10, he collected a season-high 11 combined tackles (ten solo) during a 27–6 loss to the Seattle Seahawks. He was sidelined for the Cardinals' Week 17 loss at the Denver Broncos due to a lingering issue with his stomach.

==== 2003 ====
Defensive coordinator Larry Marmie retained Wilson as the starting strong safety to start the season, opposite free safety Dexter Jackson. In Week 12, Wilson collected a season-high ten solo tackles and deflected three passes during a 30–27 loss to the St. Louis Rams. On December 29, 2003, the Arizona Cardinals fired head coach Dave McGinnis after they finished with a 4–12 record and finished last in their division with a losing record for the fourth consecutive season. He completed the season with 77 combined tackles (68 solo) and eight passes defensed in 16 games and 15 starts.

==== 2004 ====
On December 24, 2004, the Arizona Cardinals signed Wilson to a five-year, $21 million contract with a signing bonus of $4.50 million.

The Arizona Cardinals' new head coach Dennis Green retained Wilson as the starting strong safety to start the regular season, along with free safety Quentin Harris. On September 19, 2004, Wilson recorded a season-high 11 combined tackles (ten solo) and two pass deflections during a 23–12 loss to the New England Patriots. Wilson completed the 2004 season with 102 combined tackles (80 solo), eight pass deflections, three interceptions, and a sack in 16 games and 16 starts.

==== 2005 ====
Defensive coordinator Clancy Pendergast chose to retain Wilson as the starting strong safety to start the 2005 regular season, opposite free safety Robert Griffith. In Week 3, Wilson collected 11 combined tackles (six solo) and a pass deflection in the Cardinals' 37–12 loss at the Seattle Seahawks. On November 13, 2005, he collected a season-high 14 combined tackles (ten solo) and two pass deflections in a 29–21 loss at the Detroit Lions in Week 10. The following week, Wilson made eight solo tackles and a career-high three sacks on quarterback Marc Bulger during a 38–28 victory at the St. Louis Rams in Week 11. In Week 16, Wilson recorded five solo tackles, a pass deflection, and made two sacks on quarterback Donovan McNabb in the Cardinals' 27–21 win against the Philadelphia Eagles. He finished the 2005 season with a career-high 109 combined tackles (93 solo), eight passes defensed, a career-high eight sacks, a forced fumble, and an interception in 16 games and 16 starts.

==== 2006 ====
Head coach Dennis Green retained Wilson and Robert Smith as the starting safety duo to begin the season in 2006. On October 1, 2006, Wilson recorded five combined tackles, a pass deflection, and returned an interception by quarterback Michael Vick for a 99-yard touchdown as the Cardinals lost 32–10 at the Atlanta Falcons. In Week 13, he collected a season-high nine solo tackles, broke up two passes, and an interception in a 34–20 victory at the St. Louis Rams. On December 20, 2006, it was announced that Wilson was selected to play in the 2007 Pro Bowl, marking his first career Pro Bowl selection. He finished the season with a total of 82 combined tackles (74 solo), seven pass deflections, five sacks, four interceptions, and a touchdown in 16 games and 16 starts.

==== 2007 ====
On January 1, 2007, the Arizona Cardinals fired head coach Dennis Green after they completed the 2006 season with a 5–11 record. The Arizona Cardinals' new head coach Ken Whisenhunt retained Wilson as the starting strong safety to start the regular season, alongside free safety Terrence Holt. He started in the Arizona Cardinals' season-opener at the San Francisco 49ers and collected ten combined tackles (six solo) and a pass deflection in their 20–17 loss. On September 23, 2007, Wilson recorded a season-high 12 combined tackles (ten solo) during a 26–23 loss at the Baltimore Ravens in Week 3. In Week 5, he made two solo tackles, a pass deflection, and an interception in the Cardinals' 34–31 win at the St. Louis Rams. The interception marked his second consecutive interception of the season. In Week 10, Wilson sustained an injured to his heel and was inactive for the next two games (Weeks 11–12). Hie injury ended his 59-game streak of consecutive starts. On November 28, 2007, the Arizona Cardinals placed Wilson on injured reserve for the remainder of the season after it was confirmed he would have to undergo surgery to repair a torn Achilles tendon and an injury he sustained to his right heel. Wilson completed his first season under Ken Whisenhunt with a total of 44 combined tackles (33 solo), three pass deflections, and two interceptions in nine games and nine starts.

==== 2008 ====
Wilson returned as the starting strong safety in 2008 and was paired with free safety Antrel Rolle. The Cardinals' secondary also included cornerbacks Eric Green, Roderick Hood, and rookie Dominique Rodgers-Cromartie.

He started in the Arizona Cardinals' season-opener at the San Francisco 49ers and made four combined tackles, a pass deflection, and intercepted a pass by quarterback J. T. O'Sullivan in their 23–13 victory. Wilson was inactive for the Cardinals' Week 4 loss at the New York Jets. On October 8, 2008, Wilson received a $25,000 fine for roughing the passer. The fine was from a Week 5 incident where he drove quarterback Trent Edwards into the ground. Edwards was immediately rendered unconscious from the hit and caused a concussion. On November 23, 2008, Wilson collected a season-high nine combined tackles (seven solo) during a 37–29 loss to the New York Giants in Week 13. On December 17, 2008, it was announced that Wilson was selected to play in the 2009 Pro Bowl. Wilson finished the 2008 season with 75 combined tackles (60 solo), five pass deflections, 2.5 sacks, and two interceptions in 15 games and 15 starts.

The Arizona Cardinals finished the season first in the NFC West with a 9–7 record. On January 3, 2009, Wilson started his first career playoff game and recorded four solo tackles in a 30–24 victory against the Atlanta Falcons in the NFC Wildcard Game. The Cardinals defeating the Carolina Panthers 33–13 in the NFC Divisional Round. On January 18, 2009, Wilson collected seven solo tackles, deflected a pass, and made two sacks in a 32–25 victory at the Philadelphia Eagles in the NFC Championship Game. On February 1, 2009, Wilson recorded seven solo tackles in the Cardinals' 27–23 loss to the Pittsburgh Steelers in Super Bowl XLIII.

==== 2009 ====
On February 9, 2009, head coach Ken Whisenhunt fired defensive coordinator Clancy Pendergast. Pendergast was Wilson's defensive coordinator for the last six seasons.

On June 4, 2009, the Arizona Cardinals re-signed Wilson to a five-year, $39 million contract extension with $18.50 million guaranteed. The contract extension added four additional years to Wilson's previous contract that had one-year remaining.

Defensive coordinator Billy Davis retained Wilson and Antrel Rolle as the starting safety duo to begin the regular season. On December 14, 2009, Wilson recorded a season-high eight solo tackles, a career-high five pass deflections, and an interception during a 24–9 loss at the San Francisco 49ers in Week 14. On December 26, 2009, Wilson recorded four solo tackles, a pass deflection, an interception, and a sack during a 31–19 victory against the St. Louis Rams. His sack was the 20th of his career and earned him the recognition of being the 14th player to record 20 sacks and 20 interceptions in their career and become the a member of the 20–20 club. On December 29, 2009, Wilson was voted to the 2010 Pro Bowl, marking the third selection of his career. Wilson completed the 2009 season with 74 combined tackles (61 solo), 13 passes defensed, five interceptions, and two sacks in 16 games and 16 starts.

The Arizona Cardinals finished atop The NFC West with a 10–6 record and clinched a wildcard berth. On January 16, 2010, Wilson recorded nine combined tackles and a pass deflection during a 45–14 loss at the New Orleans Saints in the NFC Divisional Round.

==== 2010 ====
Head coach Ken Whisenhunt retained Wilson as the starting strong safety in 2010, alongside free safety Kerry Rhodes. He started in the Arizona Cardinals' season-opener at the St. Louis Rams and recorded two solo tackles, two pass deflections, a sack, and intercepted two passes by quarterback Sam Bradford in their 17–13 victory. In Week 14, he collected a season-high 11 solo tackles and a pass deflection during a 43–13 victory against the Denver Broncos. He completed the season with 88 combined tackles (76 solo), nine pass deflections, two interceptions, and two sacks in 16 games and 16 starts. He was ranked 89th by his fellow players on the NFL Top 100 Players of 2011.

==== 2011 ====
On January 6, 2011, Arizona Cardinals' head coach Ken Whisenhunt fired defensive coordinator Bill Davis after the team finished with a 5–11 record in 2010. Their new defensive coordinator, Ray Horton, retained both Wilson and Kerry Rhodes as the starting safety tandem to begin the regular season. On December 18, 2011, Wilson collected a season-high eight solo tackles and deflected a pass during a 20–17 victory against the Cleveland Browns in Week 15. On December 27, 2011, Wilson was selected to play in the 2012 Pro Bowl, marking his fourth Pro Bowl appearance of his career. He finished the 2012 season with 65 combined tackles (48 solo), 14 passes defensed, and an interception in 16 games and 16 starts.

==== 2012 ====
On July 25, 2012, Wilson agreed to restructure his contract to help the Cardinals free up additional cap space. Head coach Ken Whisenhunt retained Wilson and Rhodes as the starting safety duo in 2012. In a Week 1 win against the division rival Seattle Seahawks Wilson intercepted rookie quarterback Russell Wilson, this was the first interception in Russell Wilson's career. Wilson was inactive for the Cardinals' Week 3 victory against the Philadelphia Eagles after injuring his groin and ankle. The injuries ended his streak of 62 consecutive regular season games played. In Week 4, he collected a season-high ten combined tackles (eight solo), three pass deflections, a forced fumble, and sacked quarterback Ryan Tannehill during a 24–21 overtime victory against the Miami Dolphins. On December 16, 2012, Wilson recorded three solo tackles and sacked quarterback Matthew Stafford during a 38–10 win against the Detroit Lions in Week 15. The sack brought his career total to 25 sacks. Along with his 27 interceptions, Wilson became only the sixth player in league history to earn 25 sacks and 25 interceptions over the course of their career and join the vaunted 25–25 club. He completed his last season with the Cardinals with a total of 54 combined tackles (39 solo), five pass deflections, three sacks, a forced fumble, and an interception in 15 games and 14 starts.

==== 2013 ====
On January 3, 2013, the Arizona Cardinals fired general manager Rod Graves and head coach Ken Whisenhunt after they did not qualify for the playoffs after finishing with a 5–11 record in 2012.

On March 8, 2013, the Arizona Cardinals released Wilson ending his 12-year tenure with the team.

==== New England Patriots ====
On March 15, 2013, the New England Patriots signed Wilson to a three-year, $5 million contract that includes a signing bonus of $1 million.

Upon joining the team, Wilson offered Kyle Arrington a year's supply of diapers for Arrington's newborn baby to have his jersey No. 24, the number Wilson had in Arizona. On May 1, 2013, Wilson received the No. 24 jersey from Kyle Arrington. Kyle Arrington was reassigned to No. 25. During training camp, Wilson competed to be the starting strong safety against Duron Harmon and Steve Gregory. On August 31, 2013, the Patriots placed Wilson on the season-ending injured reserve due to an Achilles tendon injury. On April 4, 2014, the Patriots released Wilson.

==== Chicago Bears ====
On June 23, 2014, the Chicago Bears signed Wilson to a one-year, $955,000 contract at the veteran minimum. Throughout training camp, he competed against Ryan Mundy for the job as the starting strong safety. On August 23, 2014, the Bears waived Wilson as part of their roster cuts.

=== Retirement ===
On April 20, 2015, Wilson announced his retirement and signed a one-day contract with the Cardinals.

== NFL career statistics ==
Legend
**Bold**	Career high

Year	Team	GP	Tackles				Fumbles			Interceptions						Other		
Year	Team	GP	Cmb	Solo	Ast	Sck	FF	FR	Yds	Int	Yds	Avg	Lng	TD	PD	Stuffs	StuffY	KB
2001	ARI	16	32	24	8	0.5	0	0	0	2	97	**49**	61	**1**	8	2	0	0
2002	ARI	14	91	65	**26**	1.5	1	0	0	4	35	9	35	0	5	2	0	0
2003	ARI	16	77	68	9	0.0	2	0	0	0	0	0	0	0	8	1	0	**1**
2004	ARI	16	102	80	22	1.0	1	**2**	0	3	62	21	27	0	11	**11**	0	0
2005	ARI	16	**109**	**93**	16	**8.0**	1	**2**	0	1	36	36	36	0	9	7	0	0
2006	ARI	16	83	75	8	5.0	**4**	**2**	0	4	**146**	37	**99**	**1**	11	7	15	0
2007	ARI	9	44	33	11	0.0	0	0	0	2	20	10	20	0	3	4	15	0
2008	ARI	15	75	60	15	2.5	2	0	0	2	37	19	28	0	5	5	14	0
2009	ARI	16	74	61	13	2.0	1	**2**	**11**	**5**	56	11	41	0	13	10	20	0
2010	ARI	16	88	76	12	2.0	0	0	0	2	4	2	4	0	9	4	11	**1**
2011	ARI	16	65	48	17	0.0	1	0	0	1	17	17	17	0	**14**	8	**22**	0
2012	ARI	15	54	39	15	3.0	1	0	0	1	-2	-2	-2	0	5	2	7	**1**
Career		181	894	722	172	25.5	14	8	0	27	508	19	99	2	101	63	104	3

=== NFL records ===
- 2nd most sacks in a single season by a defensive back (8 in 2005).

=== Cardinals franchise records ===
- 2nd longest interception return touchdown: 99 (tied with Dominique Rodgers-Cromartie)
- Most passes defended (95)

== Executive career ==
=== Arizona Cardinals ===
Following his playing career, Wilson was hired by the Arizona Cardinals as a regional scout in 2015. In May 2019, Wilson was promoted to director of pro scouting.

On February 16, 2021, Wilson was promoted to vice president of pro scouting.

=== Carolina Panthers ===
On February 27, 2023, Wilson left the Cardinals in favor of the Carolina Panthers, assuming the role of Vice President of Player Personnel. On July 7, 2024, Wilson and the Panthers organization parted ways.

== Personal life ==
Wilson attended T. Wingate Andrews High School in High Point, North Carolina. Wilson has four children, one which was born shortly after the Arizona Cardinals loss to the New Orleans Saints in the 2009 Divisional Round. He owned a designer shoe store in Arizona called High Point.

On June 1, 2024, Wilson was arrested in Scottsdale, Arizona on three domestic violence–related charges.
