= Antrel Rolle =

American football player (born 1982)

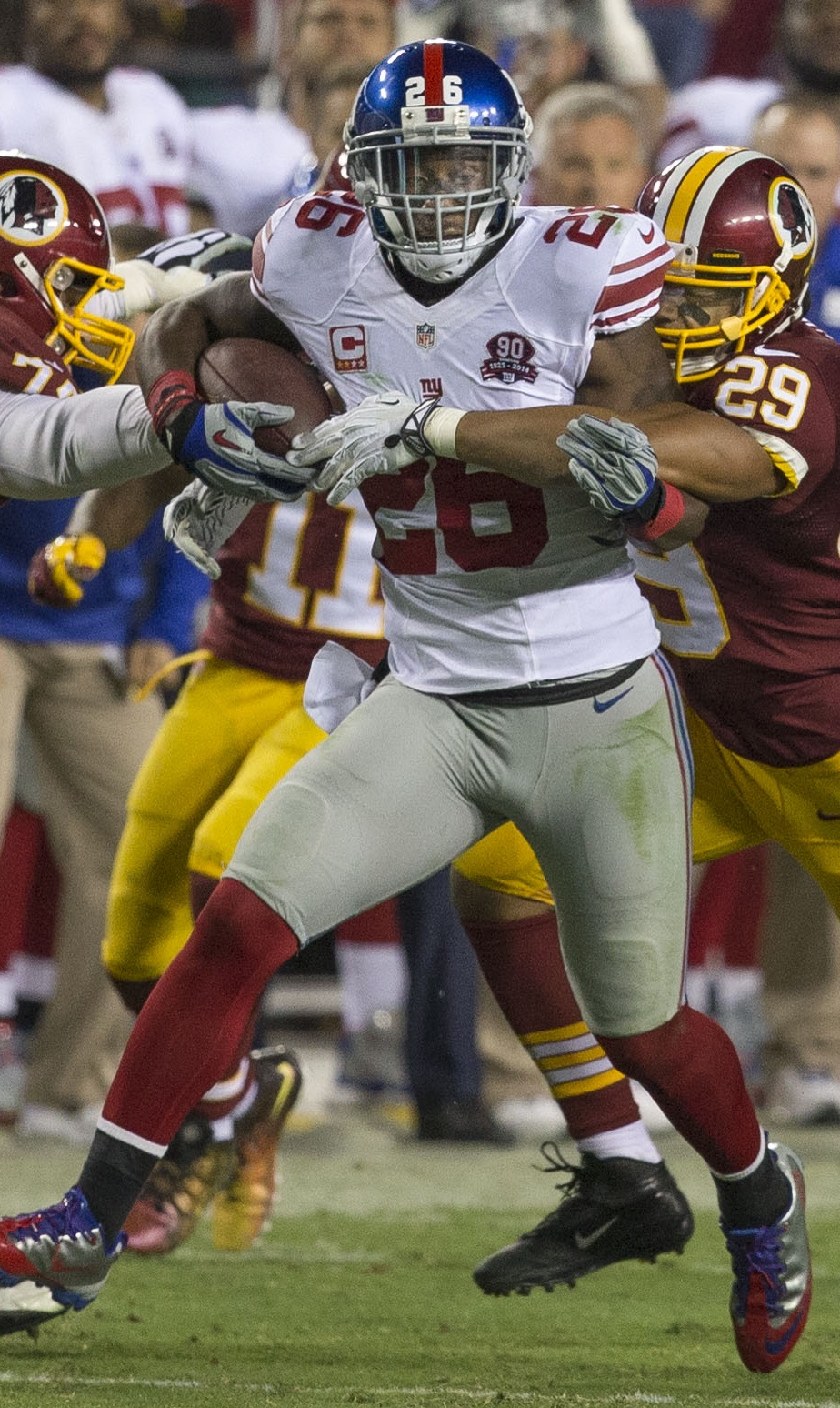
- Rolle with the New York Giants in 2014

No. 21, 26, 31
- Position: Defensive back

Personal information
- Born: December 16, 1982 (age 43); Homestead, Florida, U.S.
- Listed height: 6 ft 0 in (1.83 m)
- Listed weight: 206 lb (93 kg)

Career information
- High school: South Dade (Homestead)
- College: Miami (FL) (2001–2004)
- NFL draft: 2005: 1st round, 8th overall pick

Career history
- Arizona Cardinals (2005–2009); New York Giants (2010–2014); Chicago Bears (2015)

Awards and highlights
- Super Bowl champion (XLVI); 2× Second-team All-Pro (2010, 2013); 3× Pro Bowl (2009, 2010, 2013); BCS national champion (2001); Jack Tatum Trophy (2004); Unanimous All-American (2004); Third-team All-American (2003); First-team All-ACC (2004); First-team All-Big East (2002)

Career NFL statistics
- Total tackles: 834
- Sacks: 4
- Forced fumbles: 8
- Pass deflections: 69
- Interceptions: 26
- Defensive touchdowns: 5
- Stats at Pro Football Reference

Antrel Rocelious Rolle (born December 16, 1982) is an American former professional football player who was a cornerback in the National Football League (NFL). He played college football for the Miami Hurricanes, earning unanimous All-American honors. He was selected by the Arizona Cardinals with the eighth overall pick in the 2005 NFL draft. Rolle also played for the Chicago Bears and New York Giants, winning Super Bowl XLVI with New York in 2011 over the New England Patriots.

== Early life ==
Rolle was born in Homestead, Florida. He attended South Dade High School in Homestead, where he was a letterman in football and played for the South Dade Buccaneers high school football team. As a junior, he posted three interceptions, 85 tackles, and five pass deflections, and he returned three kickoffs and three punts for touchdowns. As a senior, he compiled three interceptions and 86 tackles; on offense, he had four receptions for 160 yards and a touchdown. In track & field, Rolle was a state qualifier in the hurdling events. At the 2000 FHSAA Outdoor State Finals, he took 10th in the 110-meter hurdles (15.46 s) and 15th in the 300-meter hurdles (41.84 s).

== College career ==
Rolle attended the University of Miami, where he played for coach Larry Coker's Miami Hurricanes football from 2001 to 2004. During his 2001 freshman season, Rolle was one of four true freshman to letter at Miami. He appeared in eight games, recording eight tackles and an interception. Rolle started eleven games as a sophomore in 2002, earning first-team All-Big East honors. Rolle totaled a career-high 66 tackles with two sacks, six tackles for a loss, seven pass deflections, and an interception for the season.

In 2003, as a junior, Rolle recorded 51 tackles, 3.5 tackles for a loss, seven broken up passes, and two interceptions on the year. In his final season, 2004, Rolle was recognized as a unanimous All-American. He recorded 58 tackles his senior year, 6.5 tackles behind the line of scrimmage, six pass deflections, and an interception. He was hurt late in the '04 season and missed the Virginia Tech game because of a foot sprain.

Following his senior season in 2004, he was a first-team All-Atlantic Coast Conference (ACC) and a consensus first-team All-American at cornerback. His notable senior performances included shutting down talented opposing receivers such as Larry Fitzgerald (three catches for 26 yards) and Calvin Johnson (two catches for 10 yards); both were future All-Americans.

== Professional career ==
Pre-draft measurables
Height	Weight	Arm length	Hand span	40-yard dash	20-yard shuttle	Three-cone drill	Vertical jump	Broad jump	Bench press
6 ft 0 1/8 in (1.83 m)	201 lb (91 kg)	29 3/4 in (0.76 m)	9 1/2 in (0.24 m)	4.48 s	4.01 s	6.68 s	37 in (0.94 m)	10 ft 3 in (3.12 m)	15 reps
All values are from NFL Combine/Pro Day

=== Arizona Cardinals ===
==== 2005 ====
The Arizona Cardinals selected Rolle in the first round (eighth overall) of the 2005 NFL draft. Rolle was the second cornerback drafted in 2005, behind Adam "Pacman" Jones.

On August 6, 2005, the Arizona Cardinals signed Rolle to a six-year, $43 million contract that includes $7.75 million guaranteed.

Head coach Dennis Green named Rolle a starting cornerback to begin the regular season, alongside David Macklin. He made his professional regular season debut and first career start in the Arizona Cardinals' season-opener at the New York Giants and recorded one tackle in their 42–19 loss. On September 25, 2005, Rolle collected a season-high 11 combined tackles (ten solo) during a 37–12 loss at the Seattle Seahawks in Week 3. During the game, Rolle sustained an injury that was believed to be cartilage damage in his left knee and was scheduled to undergo surgery and miss 3–4 weeks. On October 3, 2005, Dr. John Uribe performed arthroscopic surgery on Rolle's knee to ostensibly repair the meniscus cartilage, but discovered ligament damage that was expected to sideline him for the rest of his rookie season. Rolle quickly recovered and returned after missing nine games (Weeks 4–13). On December 11, 2005, Rolle recorded a solo tackle, a pass deflection, and made his first career interception in the Cardinals' 17–13 loss to the Washington Redskins. His interception came off a deflection by tight end Chris Cooley who was unable to secure a pass thrown by quarterback Mark Brunell in the second quarter. The following week, he collected nine solo tackles and broke up a pass during a 30–19 loss to the Houston Texans in Week 15. He aggravated his knee injury during the game and sidelined him for the last two games of the regular season (Weeks 16–17). Rolle completed his rookie season in 2005 with 28 combined tackles (26 solo), a pass deflection, and an interception in five games and four starts.

==== 2006 ====
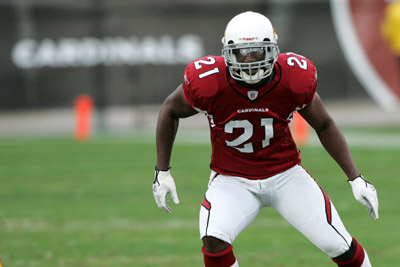
Rolle with the Arizona Cardinals, 2005

Defensive coordinator Clancy Pendergast retained Rolle and David Macklin as the starting cornerbacks to start the 2006 season. In Week 5, he collected eight solo tackles and a season-high two pass deflections in the Cardinals' 23–20 loss to the Kansas City Chiefs. On December 17, 2006, Rolle recorded a season-high 11 combined tackles (nine solo) and broke up a pass during a 37–20 loss to the Denver Broncos in Week 15. He finished the season with 84 combined tackles (77 solo), ten passes defensed, two forced fumbles, and an interception in 16 games and 16 starts. Rolle had issues in pass coverage and was called for seven pass interference penalties in 2006, tying Baltimore Ravens' cornerback Chris McAlister for the most in the league.

==== 2007 ====
On January 1, 2007, the Arizona Cardinals fired head coach Dennis Green after they completed the 2006 season with a 5–11 record. Rolle entered training camp slated as a starting cornerback, but saw competition for his role from Eric Green and Roderick Hood. On August 18, 2008, Rolle had a disappointing performance and gave up a 39-yard touchdown reception to wide receiver Andre Johnson during a 33–20 loss to the Houston Texans in their second preseason game. Two days later, head coach Ken Whisenhunt announced that Roderick Hood would be replacing Rolle as the starting left cornerback after performing well during the preseason. Head coach Ken Whisenhunt officially announced Rolle as the third cornerback on the depth chart, behind Eric Green and Roderick Hood, to start the regular season. Rolle was also named the first-team nickelback.

In Week 9, he collected a season-high ten combined tackles (seven solo) in the Cardinals' 17–10 loss at the Tampa Bay Buccaneers. On November 18, 2007, Rolle recorded four combined tackles, three pass deflections, three interceptions, and returned two for touchdowns during a 35–27 win at the Cincinnati Bengals. He made all three interceptions off passes by quarterback Carson Palmer and returned one for a 54-yard touchdown and another for a 55-yard touchdown. His performance earned him NFC Defensive Player of the Week honors. Rolle was promoted to starting cornerback prior to Week 13 and remained in the role after Eric Green was sidelined with an ankle injury for the last five games (Weeks 13–17). On December 30, 2007, Rolle recorded two solo tackles, three pass deflections, two interceptions, and a touchdown during a 48–19 victory against the St. Louis Rams. He had a pick six after intercepting a pass by Marc Bulger and returned in it for a 47-yard touchdown in the third quarter. He finished with 62 combined tackles (52 solo), ten passes defensed, five interceptions, and three touchdowns in 16 games and eight starts. Throughout the 2007 season, Rolle was mainly used as a nickelback before moving to outside cornerback for the last five games.

==== 2008 ====
On February 27, 2008, it was reported that the Arizona Cardinals would be moving Rolle to free safety for the 2008 NFL season after he impressed as the nickelback in 2007. As the nickelback, he was tasked with covering the deep middle of the field multiple times as a sub-safety. He intercepted four passes from the nickel position in 2007. Rolle entered training camp slated as the de facto starting free safety after the Cardinals opted to release Terrence Holt during the offseason. Head coach Ken Whisenhunt officially named Rolle the starting free safety to begin the regular season, along with strong safety Adrian Wilson.

On November 2, 2008, Rolle recorded four solo tackles, deflected a pass, and returned an interception by Marc Bulger for a 40-yard touchdown during the second quarter of a 34–13 win at the St. Louis Rams in Week 9. In Week 16, he collected a season-high ten solo tackles in the Cardinals' 47–7 loss at the New England Patriots. In his first season as a free safety, Rolle recorded 89 combined tackles (78 solo), five passes defensed, an interception, and a touchdown in 16 games and 16 starts.

The Arizona Cardinals finished first in the NFC West with a 9–7 record and earned a wildcard berth. On January 3, 2009, Rolle started in his first career playoff game and recorded three combined tackles during a 30–24 victory against the Atlanta Falcons in the NFC Wildcard Game. The following week, he collected six combined tackles, deflected a pass, and intercepted a pass by Jake Delhomme in the Cardinals' 33–13 win at the Carolina Panthers in the NFC Divisional Round. The Cardinals reached the Super Bowl after defeating the Philadelphia Eagles 32–25 in the NFC Championship Game. On February 1, 2009, Rolle started in Super Bowl XLIII and recorded three combined tackles as the Cardinals lost 27–23 in a closely contested matchup against the Pittsburgh Steelers.

==== 2009 ====
On February 9, 2009, head coach Ken Whisenhunt fired defensive coordinator Clancy Pendergast after he was the Cardinals' defensive coordinator for the last six seasons. Their new defensive coordinator, Bill Davis, retained Rolle and Adrian Wilson as the starting safety tandem to start the 2009 regular season.

He started in the Arizona Cardinals' season-opener against the San Francisco 49ers and recorded one tackle and a strip/sack in their 20–16 loss. His forced fumble on quarterback Shaun Hill was recovered by linebacker Bertrand Berry and marked the first sack of his career. On October 25, 2009, he collected eight combined tackles, deflected a pass, and made an interception off a pass by Eli Manning during a 24–17 win at the New York Giants. In Week 10, he collected a season-high nine solo tackles, made two pass deflections, and an interception in the Cardinals' 31–20 victory against the Seattle Seahawks. On December 29, 2009, Rolle was voted to play in the 2010 Pro Bowl to mark the first Pro Bowl selection of his career. Head coach Ken Whisenhunt chose to rest Rolle during a Week 17 loss to the Green Bay Packers as the Cardinals had already clinched both a playoff berth and NFC West title with a 10–5 record prior to the game. He completed the 2009 season with 72 combined tackles (61 solo), eight passes defensed, four interceptions, and 1.5 sacks in 15 games and 15 starts. He also had one pass for nine-yards and returned six punts for 55-yards (9.2 YPR).

On January 10, 2010, Rolle recorded a season-high 13 combined tackles (nine solo) during a 51–45 victory against the Green Bay Packers in the NFC Wildcard Game. The following week, he made three combined tackles as the Cardinals were routed by the New Orleans Saints and lost 45–14 in the NFC Divisional Round.

==== 2010 ====
On March 4, 2010, the Arizona Cardinals released Rolle in order to avoid a $4 million roster bonus. General manager Rod Graves stated that team would be interested in re-signing Rolle. Rolle immediately became an unrestricted free agent and attended meetings with the New York Giants and Miami Dolphins. The Miami Dolphins reportedly offered Rolle a five-year contract worth anywhere from $30-$35 million. He was ranked 68th by his fellow players on the NFL Top 100 Players of 2011.

=== New York Giants ===
On March 5, 2010, the New York Giants signed Rolle to a five-year, $37 million contract that includes $15 million guaranteed. The deal made Rolle the highest paid safety in league history.

Head coach Tom Coughlin named Rolle the starting free safety to begin the 2010 regular season, alongside strong safety Deon Grant. He started in the New York Giants' season-opener against the Carolina Panthers and collected a season-high eight combined tackles in their 31–18 victory. The following week, he tied his season-high of eight combined tackles during a 38–14 loss at the Indianapolis Colts in Week 2. On October 17, 2010, Rolle recorded six combined tackles, broke up a pass, and made his first interception as a member of the Giants during a 28–20 victory against the Detroit Lions in Week 6. On December 28, 2010, Rolle was selected to play in the 2011 Pro Bowl, which marked his second consecutive selection. He finished the 2010 NFL season with 87 combined tackles (75 solo), four pass deflections, and an interception in 16 games and 16 starts.

==== 2011 ====
Defensive coordinator Perry Fewell retained Rolle as the starting free safety in 2011, along with strong safety Kenny Phillips. On September 19, 2011, Rolle collected a season-high nine combined tackles in the Giants' 28–16 victory against the St. Louis Rams. In Week 17, he recorded eight combined tackles, a pass deflection, and an interception during a 31–14 win against the Dallas Cowboys. He finished the season with 96 combined tackles (82 solo), four pass deflections, and two interceptions in 16 games and 16 starts. Rolle was required to play in the box and cover the slot receiver during the 2011 season.

The New York Giants finished atop The NFC East with a 9–7 record and clinched a wildcard berth. On January 8, 2012, Rolle recorded nine combined tackles as the Giants routed the Atlanta Falcons 24–2 in the NFC Wild Card Game. They reached the Super Bowl after defeating the Green Bay Packers 37–20 in the NFC Divisional Round and the San Francisco 49ers 20–17 in the NFC Championship Game. On February 5, 2012, Rolle recorded three solo tackles as the New York Giants defeated the New England Patriots 21–17 to win Super Bowl XLVI.

==== 2012 ====
Rolle and Kenny Phillips returned as the starting safety duo under head coach Tom Coughlin in 2012. He started in the New York Giants' season-opener against the Dallas Cowboys and collected a season-high nine solo tackles in their 24–17 loss. On October 14, 2012, Rolle recorded six combined tackles, two pass deflections, and intercepted two passes by quarterback Alex Smith during a 26–3 victory at the San Francisco 49ers in Week 6. This became Rolle's first multi-interception game since 2007. In Week 13, he collected a season-high 11 combined tackles (five solo) in the Giants' 17–16 loss at the Washington Redskins. He completed the 2012 season with 96 combined tackles (73 solo), five pass deflections, two interceptions, and a forced fumble in 16 games and 16 starts. Although Rolle was the Giants' free safety, he was given nickelback duties and was required to play in the box and cover the slot.

==== 2013 ====
Rolle entered training camp slated as the starting free safety after the Giants added depth and signed Aaron Ross, Terell Thomas, and Jayron Hosley. Strong safety Stevie Brown tore his ACL during camp and was slated to miss the entire season. During the Giants second preseason game he sustained a sprained ankle. Ryan Mundy excelled at free safety during Rolle's two-game absence and was able to supplant Rolle as the starter. Head coach Tom Coughlin officially named Rolle the starting strong safety to begin the regular season, alongside Mundy.

On October 21, 2013, Rolle made a season-high three pass deflections, six combined tackles, and an interception during a 23–7 win against the Minnesota Vikings in Week 7. In Week 10, he collected a season-high 12 combined tackles (ten solo) and a sack in the Giants' 24–20 win against the Oakland Raiders. On December 15, 2013, Rolle recorded seven combined tackles, a pass deflection, and intercepted a pass by Russell Wilson during a 23–0 loss to the Seattle Seahawks in Week 15. On December 28, 2013, Rolle was named as an alternate to the 2014 Pro Bowl. Rolle finished the 2013 season with a 98 combined tackles (80 solo), 12 pass deflections, six interceptions, and two sacks in 16 games and 16 starts. He set career-highs in a four statistical categories.

On January 20, 2014, it was announced that Rolle would play in the 2014 Pro Bowl as a late replacement for Earl Thomas who was appearing in the Super Bowl XLVIII with the Seattle Seahawks. On January 24, 2014, he appeared in the 2014 Pro Bowl with Team Rice and helped them defeat Team Sanders 22–21.

==== 2014 ====
Defensive coordinator Perry Fewell chose to retain Rolle as the starting strong safety after he earned a Pro Bowl selection the previous season. He was officially named the starter to begin the regular season, opposite free safety Stevie Brown. In Week 5, Rolle collected a season-high 11 combined tackles (eight solo) in the Giants' 30–20 victory against the Atlanta Falcons. The following week, he recorded four solo tackles, a pass deflection, and an interception during a 27–0 loss at the Philadelphia Eagles in Week 6. He completed the season with 87 combined tackles (71 solo), nine passes defensed, three interceptions, and a forced fumble in 16 games and 16 starts.

=== Chicago Bears ===
On March 11, 2015, the Chicago Bears signed Rolle to a three-year, $11.25 million contract with $4.90 million guaranteed.

Throughout training camp, Rolle competed to be the starting strong safety against former New York Giants' teammate Ryan Mundy. Head coach John Fox named Rolle the starting strong safety to start the regular season, alongside free safety Brock Vereen. On September 27, 2015, Rolle collected a season-high ten combined tackles (seven solo) during a 26–0 loss at the Seattle Seahawks in Week 3. The following week, he sustained an ankle injury during a 22–20 victory against the Oakland Raiders and was carted off the field in the second quarter. He was diagnosed with a sprained ankle and was sidelined for the next two games (Weeks 5–6). The injury snapped his 84-game streak of consecutive starts and also marked the first time he missed a game due to injury since his rookie season. On November 21, 2015, Rolle sustained a sprained MCL while participating in a walk-through during practice. On December 14, 2015, the Chicago Bears placed Rolle on injured reserve for the last three games of the regular season. He finished his lone season with the Chicago Bears with only 35 combined tackles (30 solo) and a pass deflection in seven games and seven starts.

On May 1, 2016, the Chicago Bears released Rolle with two years remaining on his contract.

=== Retirement ===
On November 7, 2016, Rolle announced his retirement from football on Good Morning Football.

=== Career statistics ===
Years	Teams	Games		Tackles				Interceptions						Fumbles	
Years	Teams	G	GS	Total	Solo	Sck	Sfty	Int	Yds	Avg	Lng	TD	PD	FF	FR
2005	ARI	5	4	28	26	0	0	1	29	29.0	29	0	2	0	0
2006	ARI	16	16	84	77	0	0	1	23	23.0	23	0	11	2	0
2007	ARI	16	8	62	52	0	0	5	231	46.2	57	3	10	0	0
2008	ARI	16	16	89	78	0	0	1	40	40.0	40T	1	5	0	0
2009	ARI	15	15	72	61	1.5	0	4	71	17.8	29	0	8	1	1
2010	NYG	16	16	87	75	0.5	0	1	36	36.0	36	0	4	1	2
2011	NYG	16	16	96	82	0	0	2	-1	-0.5	0	0	4	1	0
2012	NYG	16	16	96	73	0	0	2	42	21.0	22	0	5	1	1
2013	NYG	16	16	98	80	2.0	0	6	23	3.8	25	0	12	1	1
2014	NYG	16	16	87	71	0	0	3	71	23.7	39	0	9	1	1
2015	CHI	7	7	35	30	0	0	0	0	0	0	0	1	0	0
Career		155	146	834	705	4.0	0	26	565	24	57	4	71	8	6

== Personal life ==
Antrel's father and brother are police officers. His mother and sister are educators. As with many pro athletes, Rolle was victimized by one of his lawyers/financial advisors. The lawyer was indicted and Rolle also sued him.

Rolle is a distant cousin of former linebacker Brian Rolle, former cornerback Samari Rolle, and former strong safety Myron Rolle.
