= Bienemann =

Bienemann is a surname. Notable people with the surname include:

- Tom Bienemann (1928–1999), American football player
- Troy Bienemann (born 1983), American football player
- Kaspar Bienemann (1540–1591), German male theologian and poet
