= Roderick Hood =

American football player (born 1981)

No. 29, 26, 37, 26
- Position: Cornerback

Personal information
- Born: October 3, 1981 (age 45); Columbus, Georgia, U.S.
- Listed height: 5 ft 11 in (1.80 m)
- Listed weight: 201 lb (91 kg)

Career information
- High school: Carver (Columbus)
- College: Auburn
- NFL draft: 2003: undrafted

Career history
- Philadelphia Eagles (2003–2006); Arizona Cardinals (2007–2008); Cleveland Browns (2009)*; Chicago Bears (2009)*; Tennessee Titans (2009–2010); St. Louis Rams (2011)
- * Offseason or practice squad member only

Career NFL statistics
- Total tackles: 255
- Sacks: 1.0
- Forced fumbles: 2
- Fumble recoveries: 5
- Interceptions: 15
- Defensive touchdowns: 3
- Stats at Pro Football Reference

Roderick Hood (born October 3, 1981) is an American former professional football player who was a cornerback in the National Football League (NFL). He was signed by the Philadelphia Eagles as an undrafted free agent in 2003 and also played for the Arizona Cardinals, Tennessee Titans, and St. Louis Rams. He played college football for the Auburn Tigers.

== Early life ==
Hood attended Carver High School in Columbus, Georgia and was a letterman in football, basketball, and track. In track, his 4x100 relay team went to the state finals, and he helped lead the basketball team to the state finals.

== College career ==
Hood played college football at Auburn University and played in 47 games (18 starts) and finished his career with five interceptions and 106 tackles. He was also a star return specialist, returning 51 punts for 571 yards (11.2 yards per punt return) and averaged 19.9 yards on kick returns. Hood returned to Auburn following his NFL career and graduated. He completed the requirements and was awarded a Baccalaureate Degree in Public Administration following Auburn's 2014–15 academic Year.

== Professional career ==
=== Pre-draft ===
Height: 5–11. Weight: 198. 40 Yard Dash: 4.47; Bench Press: 13; Vertical Jump: 34"; Broad Jump: 10'5"

=== Philadelphia Eagles ===
Hood signed as an undrafted free agent with the Philadelphia Eagles in 2003. He signed a three-year $910,000 contract with the Eagles and as a rookie he tied for fifth on the Eagles in special teams tackles with 21. As the nickel cornerback, he recorded four tackles and recovered a fumble and recorded his first career interception. Hood finished 2004 with 32 tackles and a team-high three fumble recoveries on defense. Following an injury to starter Lito Sheppard, Hood worked his way into the starting lineup in 2005 where he had three interceptions and 41 tackles and was named to USA Today's “2005 All-Joe” team. In 2006, he played ten games with four starts and recorded 18 tackles after he signed a one-year, $1.573 million tender to remain with the Eagles for the 2006 season.

=== Arizona Cardinals ===
Following the 2006 season, Hood left the Eagles in free agency and signed a five-year $15 million contract with the Arizona Cardinals where he was the starting cornerback in 2007 and 2008. In the 2007 season, Hood had his best season with five interceptions and two of them were returned for touchdowns. Hood started all 16 games and his 196 return yards on five interceptions were second best in the NFL this season behind Antrel Rolle’s 231 return yards. In 2008 Hood played 15 games with 14 starts and intercepted one pass as the Arizona Cardinals advanced to the Super Bowl.

Hood was released by the Cardinals on April 28, 2009.

=== Cleveland Browns ===
Hood signed with the Cleveland Browns on May 26, 2009. He was released on August 31, 2009.

=== Chicago Bears ===
Hood was signed by the Chicago Bears on September 1, 2009. He was released on September 5, 2009.

=== Tennessee Titans ===
Hood was signed by the Tennessee Titans on October 15, 2009. In his first two games with the Titans, Hood recorded 6 tackles and 1 interception for 17 yards on November 1, 2009 against the Jacksonville Jaguars.

During preparations for the 2010 season Hood tore his ACL and was placed on injured reserve for the remainder of the season. He became a free agent at the end of the season.

=== St. Louis Rams ===
On September 27, 2011, Hood signed with the St. Louis Rams.

== Personal life ==
Hood's nephew Colton currently plays in the NFL as a cornerback for the New York Giants.

== NFL career statistics ==
Legend
	Led the league
**Bold**	Career high

=== Regular season ===
Year	Team	Games		Tackles					Interceptions					Fumbles			
Year	Team	GP	GS	Cmb	Solo	Ast	Sck	TFL	Int	Yds	TD	Lng	PD	FF	FR	Yds	TD
2003	PHI	14	0	19	18	1	0.0	0	1	5	0	5	3	0	1	**27**	0
2004	PHI	**16**	2	40	36	4	0.0	1	1	20	0	20	7	**1**	**3**	1	0
2005	PHI	**16**	6	42	40	2	0.0	1	3	17	0	17	15	0	0	0	0
2006	PHI	10	5	21	17	4	**1.0**	1	0	0	0	0	3	0	1	0	0
2007	ARI	**16**	**16**	**57**	**51**	**6**	0.0	0	**5**	**196**	**2**	**71**	**21**	0	0	0	0
2008	ARI	15	14	40	39	1	0.0	0	1	0	0	0	14	**1**	0	0	0
2009	TEN	6	4	16	14	2	0.0	1	3	91	1	43	4	0	0	0	0
2011	STL	9	4	20	17	3	0.0	**2**	1	27	0	27	5	0	0	0	0
		102	51	255	232	23	1.0	6	15	356	3	71	72	2	5	28	0

=== Playoffs ===
Year	Team	Games		Tackles					Interceptions					Fumbles			
Year	Team	GP	GS	Cmb	Solo	Ast	Sck	TFL	Int	Yds	TD	Lng	PD	FF	FR	Yds	TD
2003	PHI	2	0	1	1	0	0.0	0	0	0	0	0	1	0	0	0	0
2004	PHI	3	1	4	4	0	0.0	0	0	0	0	0	2	0	0	0	0
2006	PHI	2	1	6	6	0	0.0	0	0	0	0	0	0	0	0	0	0
2008	ARI	**4**	**3**	**17**	**15**	**2**	0.0	0	**1**	0	0	0	**4**	0	0	0	0
		11	5	28	26	2	0.0	0	1	0	0	0	7	0	0	0	0
