= Leonard Pope =

American football player (born 1983)

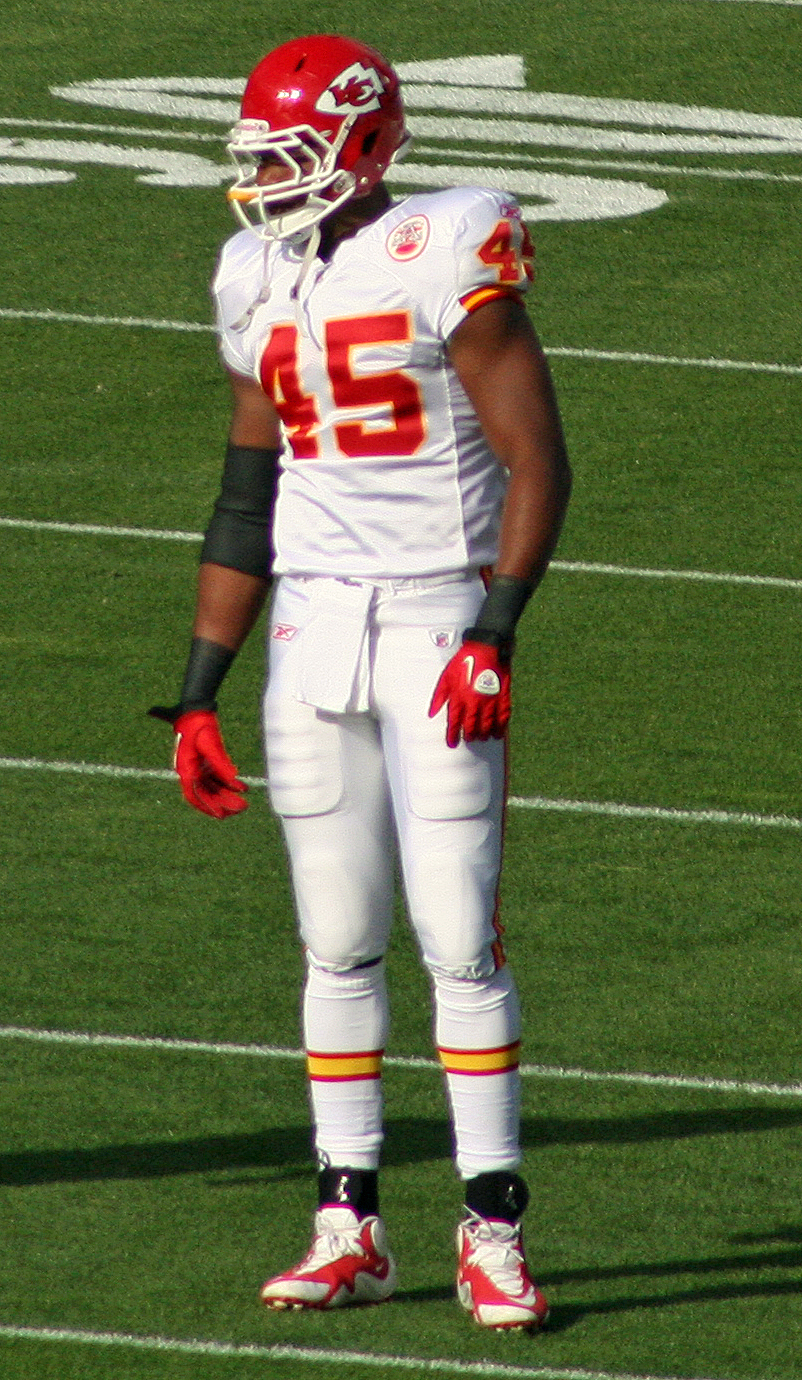
- Pope with the Chiefs in 2010

No. 45, 82
- Position: Tight end

Personal information
- Born: September 10, 1983 (age 43); Americus, Georgia, U.S.
- Listed height: 6 ft 8 in (2.03 m)
- Listed weight: 264 lb (120 kg)

Career information
- High school: Americus
- College: Georgia
- NFL draft: 2006: 3rd round, 72nd overall pick

Career history
- Arizona Cardinals (2006−2008); Kansas City Chiefs (2009−2011); Pittsburgh Steelers (2012); Chicago Bears (2013)*
- * Offseason or practice squad member only

Awards and highlights
- 2× First-team All-SEC (2004, 2005)

Career NFL statistics
- Receptions: 105
- Receiving yards: 982
- Receiving touchdowns: 11
- Stats at Pro Football Reference

Leonard Pope (born September 10, 1983) is an American former professional football player who was a tight end in the National Football League (NFL). He was selected by the Arizona Cardinals in the third round of the 2006 NFL draft. He played college football for the Georgia Bulldogs.

Pope was also a member of the Kansas City Chiefs, Pittsburgh Steelers, and the Chicago Bears.

== Professional career ==
Pre-draft measurables
Height	Weight	Arm length	Hand span	40-yard dash	10-yard split	20-yard split	20-yard shuttle	Three-cone drill	Vertical jump	Broad jump	Bench press
6 ft 7 3/4 in (2.03 m)	258 lb (117 kg)	34 1/4 in (0.87 m)	9 1/4 in (0.23 m)	4.65 s	1.60 s	2.71 s	4.67 s	7.47 s	37.5 in (0.95 m)	9 ft 10 in (3.00 m)	22 reps
All values from NFL Combine

=== Arizona Cardinals ===
After emerging as a redzone target in 2007 with five touchdown catches, in 2008 Pope had nine catches total (none for a touchdown).

The Cardinals waived Pope on September 4, 2009.

=== Kansas City Chiefs ===
Pope signed with the Kansas City Chiefs on September 29, 2009. Pope scored four touchdowns during his three seasons with the Chiefs. In 2011, he started ten games, setting career highs in receptions and yards, and tying his career high in average yards per catch. One of his notable plays was during the 2011 Chiefs/Packers game where the Chiefs upset the previously undefeated Packers 19–14. Pope attempted to catch the ball, was tackled and possibly fumbled the ball before he had gone out of bounds. The play was reviewed, and the referees said it was a catch.

=== Pittsburgh Steelers ===
Pope signed a one-year contract with the Pittsburgh Steelers on April 10, 2012, reuniting him with his former Cardinals and Chiefs coach Todd Haley, who was the Steelers offensive coordinator.

=== Chicago Bears ===
On August 3, 2013, Pope was signed by the Chicago Bears. He was released on August 25.

== Personal life ==
Pope has four brothers, four sisters, two daughters (Cheryan and Laila Pope), and three sons (Leonard Pope IV, Lucas Rylan Pope and Lawson Reid Pope). He attended Americus High School in Americus, Georgia.

Pope saved 6-year-old Bryson Moore from drowning in June 2011.

Pope's nickname is "Champ", and he has a charity foundation also called CHAMP (Creating Hope And Making Progress) to help under-privileged children.
