= Troy Bienemann =

American football player (born 1983)

No. 83
- Position: Tight end

Personal information
- Born: February 19, 1983 (age 43); Minneapolis, Minnesota, U.S.
- Listed height: 6 ft 5 in (1.96 m)
- Listed weight: 242 lb (110 kg)

Career information
- High school: Saint Francis (Mountain View, California)
- College: Washington State
- NFL draft: 2006: undrafted

Career history
- New Orleans Saints (2006)*; Arizona Cardinals (2007)
- * Offseason or practice squad member only

Awards and highlights
- Second-team All-Pac-10 (2005)

Career NFL statistics
- Receptions: 7
- Receiving yards: 46
- Receiving touchdowns: 1
- Stats at Pro Football Reference

Troy Michael Bienemann (born February 19, 1983) is an American former professional football player who was a tight end in the National Football League (NFL). He played college football for the Washington State Cougars before being signed by the New Orleans Saints as an undrafted free agent in 2006.

Bienemann was born in Minneapolis, Minnesota, attended St. Francis High School, and lettered in football and basketball. As a junior, he was a first-team All-League selection. As a senior, he was named as the League co-Defensive Player of the Year, was a first-team All-Mid Peninsula selection, was named to the All-Metropolitan team, and was named to the PrepStar Far West Team.
