= Eric Green (cornerback) =

American football player (born 1982)

No. 25, 24
- Position: Cornerback

Personal information
- Born: March 16, 1982 (age 44); Pahokee, Florida, U.S.
- Listed height: 6 ft 0 in (1.83 m)
- Listed weight: 198 lb (90 kg)

Career information
- High school: Clewiston (FL)
- College: Virginia Tech
- NFL draft: 2005: 3rd round, 75th overall pick

Career history
- Arizona Cardinals (2005–2008); Miami Dolphins (2009)*; San Francisco 49ers (2009)*; Omaha Nighthawks (2010–2011)
- * Offseason or practice squad member only

Awards and highlights
- Second-team Freshman All-American (2002)

Career NFL statistics
- Total tackles: 169
- Forced fumbles: 2
- Fumble recoveries: 2
- Pass deflections: 32
- Interceptions: 2
- Stats at Pro Football Reference

Eric Denaud Green (born March 16, 1982) is an American former professional football player who was a cornerback in the National Football League (NFL). He was selected by the Arizona Cardinals in the third round of the 2005 NFL draft. He played college football for the Virginia Tech Hokies.

Green was also a member of the Miami Dolphins, San Francisco 49ers and Omaha Nighthawks.

== Early life ==
Green played high school football at Clewiston High School in Clewiston, Florida where he played quarterback, wide receiver, and defensive back. He earned All-State Honors as a senior with 1,100 passing yards and 400+ rushing.

He also participated in track and field, where he placed fifth in 110m hurdles with a time of 14.3 seconds.

== College career ==
Green played college football for the Virginia Tech Hokies. During his career, he recorded 143 tackles (91 solo), four blocked kicks, and 25 pass deflections. He also posted eight interceptions with 264 return yards, third most in school history.

== Professional career ==
=== Arizona Cardinals ===
Drafted in the third round in 2005, Green played in 12 games and started five. He played in 15 games in 2006, starting 8, and leading with 13 defensed passes. He started the first 11 games of 2007 having 56 tackles, but on November 27 was placed on injured reserve with a groin injury. A restricted free agent in the 2008 offseason, Green signed his one-year, $2.017 million first-round tender offer on April 3, 2008.

=== Miami Dolphins ===
An unrestricted free agent after the 2008 season, Green signed with the Miami Dolphins on March 12, 2009. He was released on August 19.

=== San Francisco 49ers ===
Green signed with the San Francisco 49ers hours after being released by the Dolphins on August 19.

== NFL career statistics ==
Legend
**Bold**	Career high

Year	Team	Games		Tackles					Interceptions					Fumbles			
Year	Team	GP	GS	Cmb	Solo	Ast	Sck	TFL	Int	Yds	TD	Lng	PD	FF	FR	Yds	TD
2005	ARI	12	5	42	37	**5**	0.0	0	**1**	**13**	0	**13**	6	**1**	**1**	0	0
2006	ARI	**15**	8	44	41	3	0.0	**1**	0	0	0	0	**12**	**1**	**1**	0	0
2007	ARI	11	**11**	**51**	**47**	4	0.0	**1**	0	0	0	0	8	0	0	0	0
2008	ARI	13	9	32	27	**5**	0.0	**1**	**1**	1	0	1	6	0	0	0	0
		51	33	169	152	17	0.0	3	2	14	0	13	32	2	2	0	0

== Personal life ==
In January 2010, Green was named in a lawsuit that alleged he forcibly sodomized a transgender woman in early 2009 in Arizona. That lawsuit was dismissed. Green's attorney claim Green was never served. The plaintiff's attorney claims he was not served because the suit settled. In October 2010, the suit was re-filed in federal court claiming Green failed to make the first payment. The suit asks for $10 million.
