= Rod Graves =

American football executive

Personal information
- Born: March 16, 1958 (age 68); Houston, Texas, U.S.

Career information
- High school: Strake Jesuit College Preparatory (Houston)
- College: Texas Tech

Career history
- Philadelphia Stars (1982–1983) Regional scout; Chicago Bears (1984–1996) – Regional scout (1984-1992) – Director of college scouting (1993) – Director of player personnel (1994-1996); Arizona Cardinals (1997–2012) – VP of football operations (1997–2002) – General manager (2003–2012); New York Jets (2013–2014) Senior director of football administration
- Executive profile at Pro Football Reference

Rod Graves (born March 16, 1959) is the former senior vice president of football administration for the New York Jets of the National Football League (NFL). He is best known for his time as general manager of the Arizona Cardinals. He had previously spent time with the Cardinals as vice president of football operations, after being promoted to that position from assistant to the president following the 2002 season.

== Executive career ==
A native of Houston, Graves began his career in professional football personnel work in 1982 as a regional scout for the Philadelphia Stars of the United States Football League. It was then he first crossed paths with former Cardinals’ Head Coach Vince Tobin, the Stars’ defensive coordinator. In 1983, Graves was promoted to assistant director of player personnel.

=== Chicago Bears ===
He joined the National Football League in 1984 as a regional scout for the Chicago Bears, a position he held until promoted to director of college scouting in 1993, then director of player personnel in 1994.

During his tenure with the Bears, he worked for Bill Tobin, the team’s director of player personnel and older brother of former Cardinal head coach Vince Tobin, along with another former Cardinal head coach, Dave McGinnis, and running backs coach Johnny Roland.

=== Arizona Cardinals ===
Graves joined the Cardinals in June 1997 after 13 years in various personnel capacities with the Chicago Bears. He was promoted to assume responsibility for administration of the Cardinals’ scouting department in May 1998.

In his position as Arizona Cardinals General Manager, Graves was responsible for all facets of the Cardinals’ football operations. He served as the team’s primary contract negotiator in addition to overseeing college and professional scouting efforts, assisting salary-cap management, and consulting on other business aspects of the football operation.

He was selected by Sports Illustrated as one of the “101 Most Influential Minorities in Sports” in 2003 as well as one of the “50 Most Powerful Blacks in Sports” by Black Enterprise in 2005. He served on the NFL’s C.E.C. Working Group Committee and the NFL College Advisory Committee.

On December 31, 2012, Graves was relieved of his general manager duties for the Cardinals. The team had gone 5-11 that season, and hadn't made the playoffs since losing to the New Orleans Saints in the 2009 NFL divisional playoff with Kurt Warner at quarterback.

=== New York Jets ===
On June 10, 2013, the New York Jets announced the hiring of Rod Graves as senior director of football administration. After the firing of general manager John Idzik Jr. at the conclusion of the 2014 season, Graves was named Interim General Manager.

=== League front office ===
On July 8, 2015, Graves left the Jets to join the NFL's front office as their senior vice president of football administration.

== Personal life ==
Graves, who graduated from Strake Jesuit College Preparatory and holds a bachelor's degree in economics from Texas Tech University is the son of the late Jackie Graves, former assistant director of player personnel for the Philadelphia Eagles. He is married with three children, a son and two daughters
