= Clancy Pendergast =

American football coach (born 1967)

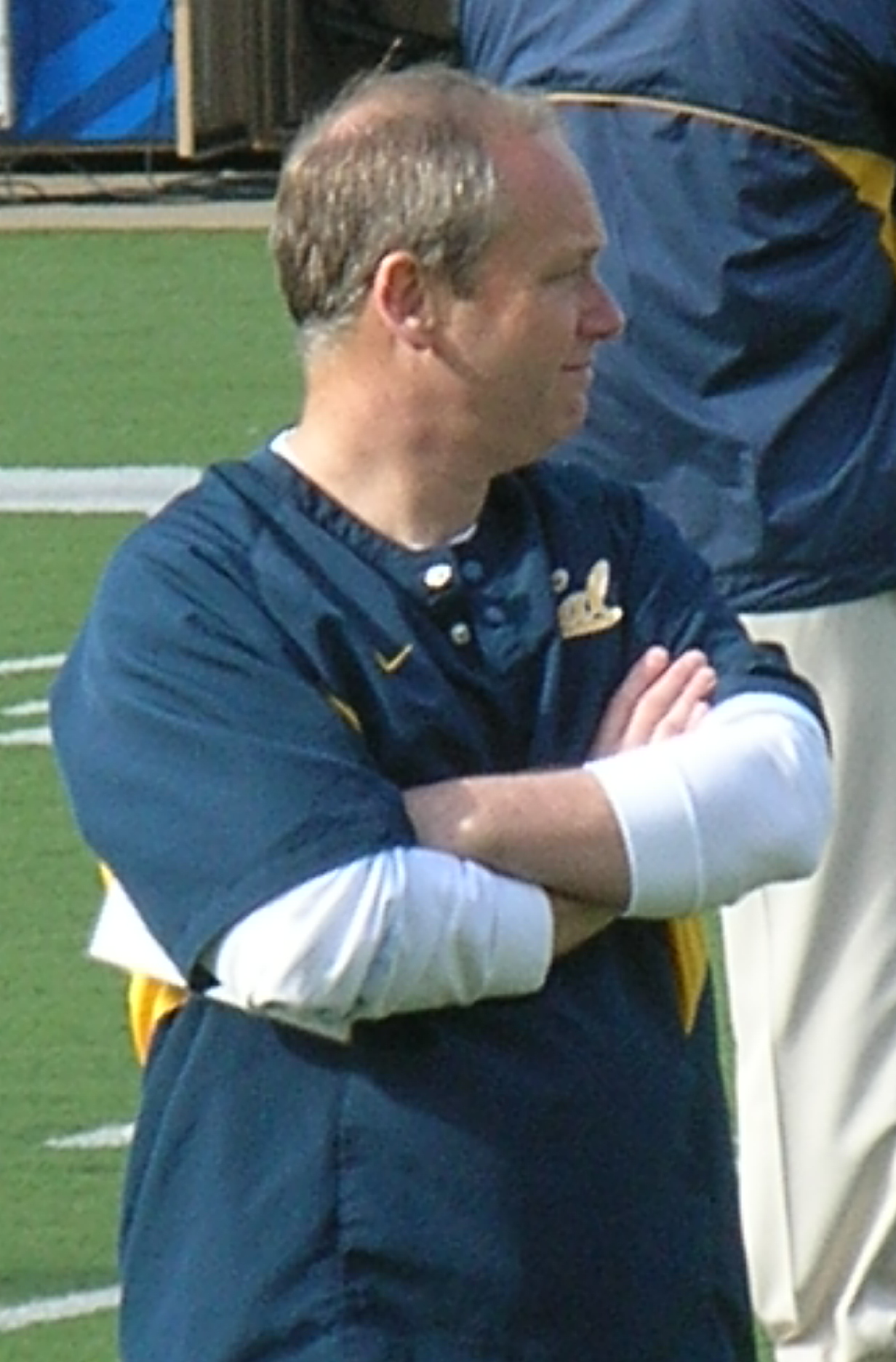

Current position
- Title: Analyst
- Team: Colorado
- Conference: Big 12

Biographical details
- Born: November 29, 1967 (age 58); Phoenix, Arizona, U.S.
- Education: Arizona

Coaching career (HC unless noted)
- 1991: Mississippi State (GA)
- 1992: USC (GA)
- 1993–1994: Oklahoma (GA/TE)
- 1995: Houston Oilers (DQC)
- 1996–1999: Dallas Cowboys (DQC)
- 2000–2002: Dallas Cowboys (DB)
- 2003: Cleveland Browns (LB)
- 2004–2008: Arizona Cardinals (DC)
- 2009: Kansas City Chiefs (DC/DB)
- 2010–2012: California (DC)
- 2013: USC (DC/DB)
- 2015: San Francisco 49ers (LB)
- 2016–2019: USC (DC)
- 2021–2025: UCLA (Analyst)
- 2026–present: Colorado (Analyst)

Clarence Clifford Pendergast III (born November 29, 1967) is an American football coach who served as defensive coordinator for the Arizona Cardinals, Kansas City Chiefs, California Golden Bears, and USC Trojans football teams.

== Early coaching career ==
He was a graduate assistant or assistant coach at Mississippi State, University of Southern California, University of Oklahoma, and University of Alabama at Birmingham before joining the Houston Oilers in 1995.

After a year with the Oilers, he joined the Dallas Cowboys, where he spent seven seasons, first as defensive assistant/quality control/linebackers coach (1996–99), and later handing responsibilities in nickel defense packages (2000) and the secondary (2001–02). Pendergast helped develop first-round draft pick Roy Williams into a Pro Bowl safety. In 2003, he was linebackers coach with the Cleveland Browns.

== Arizona Cardinals ==
While working in Cleveland, Pendergast impressed personnel man Jeremy Green to the point that when Green's father, Dennis Green, became the head coach of the Arizona Cardinals, Jeremy convinced him to interview Pendergast for the job. Green was so impressed that he hired Pendergast as the Cardinals' Defensive Coordinator.

After Dennis Green's firing, he was retained as defensive coordinator under new Cardinals head coach Ken Whisenhunt. Pendergast helped lead the Cardinals into Super Bowl XLIII, but was fired on Friday February 6, 2009, less than one week after Arizona lost to Pittsburgh 27–23 in the Super Bowl.

== Kansas City Chiefs ==
When the Cardinals fired Pendergast, he was immediately linked with a move to Kansas City Chiefs. Clancy Pendergast officially became the defensive coordinator for the Chiefs on March 13, 2009, where he reunited with Head Coach Todd Haley, who was offensive coordinator at Arizona during Pendergast's time there. On January 14, 2010, the Chiefs named former Cleveland Browns head coach Romeo Crennel their new defensive coordinator. According to NFL.com Pendergast was not retained for the 2010 season by the Chiefs in any coaching position. Pendergast was hired to become the Oakland Raiders defensive backs coach on February 6, 2010.

== California Golden Bears ==
On February 19, 2010, Pendergast was hired as defensive coordinator for the California Golden Bears, succeeding Bob Gregory. Under Pendergast, the Golden Bears led the conference in total defense, pass defense and fewest first downs allowed in 2010 and 2011. Pendergast also helped produce nine NFL players, including first-round pick defensive end Cameron Jordan, and Pac-12 Defensive Player of the Year linebacker Mychal Kendricks. He gained a reputation for containing the spread offense after his 2010 Bears slowed down Chip Kelly's No. 1 ranked Oregon Ducks, holding them to 40 points below their average in a 15–13 loss.

== USC Trojans ==
Pendergast was hired by the USC Trojans as defensive coordinator and defensive backs coach in 2013. Under Pendergast, USC's defense shifted from a 4–3 alignment to a 5–2 with elements of the 3–4 defense. Although head coach Lane Kiffin was fired midseason, Pendergast's defense finished the season ranked 13th in the nation and led the Pac-12.

He did not return to the team in 2014, but did so in 2016 after spending 2015 as inside linebackers coach of the San Francisco 49ers. Pendergast spent four seasons in his return to the Trojans, and was fired after a 49–24 loss to Iowa in 2019 Holiday Bowl; in 2019, USC had the 78th-ranked defense and 77th in yardage allowed.

== Personal life ==
The son of a farmer, Pendergast attended Tolleson High School, where his sister, Bonnie Pendergast, now teaches calculus. He graduated from the University of Arizona in 1990, he graduated with a bachelor's degree in agriculture. Pendergast did not play football in college, but did coach his fraternity team (Phi Gamma Delta).
