= 1998 UMass Minutemen football team =

American college football season

1998 UMass Minutemen football
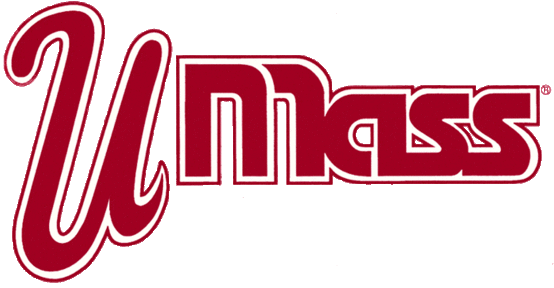

NCAA Division I-AA national champion A-10 New England Division co-champion Lambert Cup winner

Division I-AA Championship Game, W 55–43 vs. Georgia Southern
- Conference: Atlantic 10 Conference
- New England Division

Ranking
- Sports Network: No. 1
- Record: 12–3 (6–2 A-10)
- Head coach: Mark Whipple (1st season)
- Offensive scheme: Pro-style
- Defensive coordinator: Don Brown (1st season)
- Base defense: 4–3
- Home stadium: Warren McGuirk Alumni Stadium

1998 Atlantic 10 Conference football standings
| | Conf. | | | Overall |
| Team | W | | L | W | | L |
|---|---|---|---|---|---|---|
New England Division
| No. 1 UMass x^ | 6 | – | 2 | 12 | – | 3 |
| No. 9 Connecticut x^ | 6 | – | 2 | 10 | – | 3 |
| Maine | 3 | – | 5 | 6 | – | 5 |
| New Hampshire | 3 | – | 5 | 4 | – | 7 |
| Rhode Island | 2 | – | 6 | 3 | – | 8 |
Mid-Atlantic Division
| No. 10 Richmond x$^ | 7 | – | 1 | 9 | – | 3 |
| No. 23 Delaware | 4 | – | 4 | 7 | – | 4 |
| Villanova | 4 | – | 4 | 6 | – | 5 |
| No. 17 William & Mary | 4 | – | 4 | 7 | – | 4 |
| Northeastern | 3 | – | 5 | 5 | – | 6 |
| James Madison | 2 | – | 6 | 3 | – | 8 |
$ – Conference champion; x – Division champion/co-champions; ^ – NCAA Division I-AA playoff participant; Rankings from The Sports Network poll

The 1998 UMass Minutemen football team represented the University of Massachusetts Amherst in the 1998 NCAA Division I-AA football season as a member of the Atlantic 10 Conference. The team was coached by Mark Whipple and played its home games at Warren McGuirk Alumni Stadium in Hadley, Massachusetts.

1998 was the most successful season in Minutemen history, as UMass won their first national championship in the NCAA DI-AA playoffs in Whipple's first year with the team. UMass entered the postseason as champions of the A-10, but were not expected to make a serious run for the title. They reached the final game ranked 12th in the nation, and were matched up with perennial powerhouse Georgia Southern, the top ranked team in the country. The Minutemen rushed out of the gates, scoring three touchdowns in the opening quarter, and won the shootout by a final score of 55–43. UMass finished the season with a record of 12–3 overall and 6–2 in conference play.

== Schedule ==
| Date | Time | Opponent | Rank | Site | TV | Result | Attendance | Source |
|---|---|---|---|---|---|---|---|---|
| September 3 | 7:00 p.m. | at No. 3 Delaware | | Delaware Stadium; Newark, DE | | L 30–33 | 20,744 | |
| September 12 | 1:00 p.m. | at Richmond | | UR Stadium; Richmond, VA | | W 22–17 | 10,219 | |
| September 26 | 1:00 p.m. | Buffalo* | | McGuirk Stadium; Hadley, MA (rivalry) | | W 51–27 | 11,672 | |
| October 3 | 12:00 p.m. | at No. 5 Hofstra* | | Hofstra Stadium; Hempstead, NY | | W 40–35 | 5,308 | |
| October 10 | 1:00 p.m. | James Madison | No. 24 | McGuirk Stadium; Hadley, MA | | W 28–26 | 14,202 | |
| October 17 | 1:30 p.m. | at No. 15 Connecticut | No. 18 | Memorial Stadium; Storrs, CT (rivalry) | | L 41–44 | 8,581 | |
| October 24 | 1:00 p.m. | No. 22 Villanova^{†} | No. 19 | McGuirk Stadium; Hadley, MA | | W 36–26 | 12,135 | |
| October 31 | 12:30 p.m. | at New Hampshire | No. 16 | Cowell Stadium; Durham, NH (rivalry) | | W 27–26 | 3,578 | |
| November 7 | 12:00 p.m. | at Rhode Island | No. 12 | Meade Stadium; Kingston, RI | | W 23–13 | 5,036 | |
| November 14 | 12:30 p.m. | Maine | No. 10 | McGuirk Stadium; Hadley, MA | | W 55–34 | 10,355 | |
| November 21 | 12:30 p.m. | No. 9 Connecticut* | No. 7 | McGuirk Stadium; Hadley, MA | | L 27–28 | 16,392 | |
| November 28 | 7:00 p.m. | at No. 6 McNeese State* | No. 12 | Cowboy Stadium; Lake Charles, LA (NCAA Division I-AA First Round) | | W 21–19 | 11,349 | |
| December 5 | 12:00 p.m. | No. 13 Lehigh* | No. 12 | McGuirk Stadium; Hadley, MA (NCAA Division I-AA Quarterfinal) | | W 27–21 | 12,108 | |
| December 12 | 2:00 p.m. | at No. 2 Northwestern State* | No. 12 | Turpin Stadium; Natchitoches, LA (NCAA Division I-AA Semifinal) | | W 41–31 | 10,424 | |
| December 19 | 2:00 p.m. | vs. No. 1 Georgia Southern* | No. 12 | Finley Stadium; Chattanooga, TN (NCAA Division I-AA Championship Game) | ESPN | W 55–43 | 17,501 | |
*Non-conference game; ^{†}Homecoming; Rankings from The Sports Network Poll released prior to the game; All times are in Eastern time

== Rankings ==
Ranking movements Legend: ██ Increase in ranking ██ Decrease in ranking — = Not ranked RV = Received votes ( ) = First-place votes
| | Week | | | | | | | | | | | | | |
| Poll | Pre | 1 | 2 | 3 | 4 | 5 | 6 | 7 | 8 | 9 | 10 | 11 | 12 | Final |
|---|---|---|---|---|---|---|---|---|---|---|---|---|---|---|
| The Sports Network | — | — | — | — | RV | 24 | 18 | 19 | 16 | 12 | 10 | 7 | 12 | 1 (63) |

== Game summaries ==
=== At No. 3 Delaware ===
UMass Minutemen at No. 3 Delaware Fightin' Blue Hens – Game summary

| Quarter | 1 | 2 | 3 | 4 | Total |
|---|---|---|---|---|---|
| Minutemen | 13 | 10 | 0 | 7 | 30 |
| No. 3 Fightin' Blue Hens | 13 | 10 | 0 | 7 | 30 |

at Delaware Stadium • Newark, Delaware

- Date: September 3
- Game time: 7:00 p.m. EDT
- Game weather: Overcast, 81 °F (27 °C)
- Game attendance: 20,744
- Referee: K. Payne
- Box score

| Statistics | MASS | DEL |
|---|---|---|
| First downs | 23 | 21 |
| Plays–yards | 75–438 | 69–372 |
| Rushes–yards | 30–115 | 53–267 |
| Passing yards | 323 | 105 |
| Passing: comp–att–int | 26–45–0 | 8–16–0 |
| Turnovers | 1 | 3 |
| Time of possession | 27:58 | 32:02 |

| Team | Category | Player | Statistics |
|---|---|---|---|
| UMass | Passing | Todd Bankhead | 26/45, 323 yards, 4 TD |
| UMass | Rushing | Marcel Shipp | 17 rushes, 73 yards |
| UMass | Receiving | Adrian Zullo | 2 receptions, 83 yards, TD |
| Delaware | Passing | Brian Ginn | 5/12, 55 yards, 2 TD |
| Delaware | Rushing | Craig Cummings | 15 rushes, 100 yards, 2 TD |
| Delaware | Receiving | Eddie Conti | 6 receptions, 94 yards, TD |

=== At Richmond ===
UMass Minutemen at Richmond Spiders – Game summary

| Quarter | 1 | 2 | 3 | 4 | Total |
|---|---|---|---|---|---|
| Minutemen | 7 | 6 | 0 | 9 | 22 |
| Spiders | 0 | 3 | 7 | 7 | 17 |

at UR Stadium • Richmond, Virginia

- Date: September 12
- Game time: 1:00 p.m. EDT
- Game weather: Sunny and hot, 88 °F (31 °C)
- Game attendance: 10,219
- Referee: J. Gleason
- Box score

| Statistics | MASS | RICH |
|---|---|---|
| First downs | 22 | 19 |
| Plays–yards | 82–417 | 77–379 |
| Rushes–yards | 38–94 | 37–172 |
| Passing yards | 323 | 207 |
| Passing: comp–att–int | 26–44–1 | 18–40–2 |
| Turnovers | 4 | 3 |
| Time of possession | 30:33 | 29:27 |

| Team | Category | Player | Statistics |
|---|---|---|---|
| UMass | Passing | Todd Bankhead | 26/43, 323 yards, 3 TD, INT |
| UMass | Rushing | Marcel Shipp | 21 rushes, 99 yards |
| UMass | Receiving | Kerry Taylor | 9 receptions, 98 yards |
| Richmond | Passing | Jimmie Miles | 18/39, 207 yards, TD, INT |
| Richmond | Rushing | Tyronne Turner | 18 rushes, 75 yards |
| Richmond | Receiving | Muneer Moore | 9 receptions, 120 yards |

=== Buffalo ===
Buffalo Bulls at UMass Minutemen – Game summary

| Quarter | 1 | 2 | 3 | 4 | Total |
|---|---|---|---|---|---|
| Bulls | 6 | 14 | 7 | 0 | 27 |
| Minutemen | 14 | 21 | 6 | 10 | 51 |

at Warren McGuirk Alumni Stadium • Hadley, Massachusetts

- Date: September 26
- Game time: 1:00 p.m. EDT
- Game weather: Mostly sunny, 71 °F (22 °C)
- Game attendance: 11,672
- Referee: L. Nazzarro
- Box score

| Statistics | BUFF | MASS |
|---|---|---|
| First downs | 29 | 29 |
| Plays–yards | 76–529 | 84–591 |
| Rushes–yards | 32–124 | 53–339 |
| Passing yards | 405 | 252 |
| Passing: comp–att–int | 30–44–2 | 14–31–0 |
| Turnovers | 4 | 1 |
| Time of possession | 28:29 | 31:31 |

| Team | Category | Player | Statistics |
|---|---|---|---|
| Buffalo | Passing | Chad Salisbury | 27/40, 375 yards, 2 TD, 2 INT |
| Buffalo | Rushing | Joshua Roth | 12 rushes, 64 yards, TD |
| Buffalo | Receiving | Drew Haddad | 11 receptions, 173 yards, TD |
| UMass | Passing | Todd Bankhead | 13/30, 192 yards, 3 TD |
| UMass | Rushing | Marcel Shipp | 26 rushes, 221 yards, TD |
| UMass | Receiving | Jimmy Moore | 3 receptions, 99 yards, 2 TD |

=== At No. 5 Hofstra ===
UMass Minutemen at No. 5 Hofstra Flying Dutchmen – Game summary

| Quarter | 1 | 2 | 3 | 4 | Total |
|---|---|---|---|---|---|
| Minutemen | 0 | 0 | 21 | 19 | 40 |
| No. 5 Flying Dutchmen | 5 | 7 | 13 | 10 | 35 |

at Hofstra Stadium • Hempstead, New York

- Date: October 3
- Game time: 12:00 p.m. EDT
- Game weather: Cloudy, 59 °F (15 °C)
- Game attendance: 5,308
- Referee: C. Picardo
- Box score

| Statistics | MASS | HOF |
|---|---|---|
| First downs | 26 | 24 |
| Plays–yards | 80–489 | 79–527 |
| Rushes–yards | 36–141 | 30–204 |
| Passing yards | 348 | 323 |
| Passing: comp–att–int | 27–44–0 | 25–49–0 |
| Turnovers | 3 | 0 |
| Time of possession | 30:12 | 29:48 |

| Team | Category | Player | Statistics |
|---|---|---|---|
| UMass | Passing | Todd Bankhead | 27/44, 348 yards, 3 TD |
| UMass | Rushing | Marcel Shipp | 27 rushes, 146 yards |
| UMass | Receiving | Jimmy Moore | 11 receptions, 164 yards |
| Hofstra | Passing | Giovanni Carmazzi | 25/49, 323 yards, 2 TD |
| Hofstra | Rushing | Giovanni Carmazzi | 14 rushes, 139 yards, TD |
| Hofstra | Receiving | Steve Jackson | 10 receptions, 114 yards |

=== James Madison ===
James Madison Dukes at No. 24 UMass Minutemen – Game summary

| Quarter | 1 | 2 | 3 | 4 | Total |
|---|---|---|---|---|---|
| Dukes | 3 | 9 | 0 | 14 | 26 |
| No. 24 Minutemen | 0 | 7 | 14 | 7 | 28 |

at Warren McGuirk Alumni Stadium • Hadley, Massachusetts

- Date: October 10
- Game time: 1:00 p.m. EDT
- Game weather: Light rain, 57 °F (14 °C)
- Game attendance: 14,202
- Referee: K. Payne
- Box score

Game information
First quarter
- JMU – Alan Haston 25-yard field goal, 3:01. Dukes 3–0. Drive: 11 plays, 60 yards, 5:09.

Second quarter

- MASS – Todd Bankhead 1-yard run (Matt Murphy kick), 14:58. Minutemen 7–3. Drive: 10 plays, 55 yards, 3:03.
- JMU – Delvin Joyce 4-yard run (kick failed), 9:33. Dukes 9–7. Drive: 10 plays, 69 yards, 5:25.
- JMU – Alan Haston 25-yard field goal, 2:32. Dukes 12–7. Drive: 6 plays, 23 yards, 2:36.

Third quarter

- MASS – Steve Ley 0-yard fumble return (Matt Murphy kick), 13:45. Minutemen 14–12.
- MASS – Jimmy Moore 16-yard pass from Todd Bankhead (Matt Murphy kick), 5:19. Minutemen 21–12. Drive: 2 plays, 54 yards, 0:33.

Fourth quarter

- MASS – Marcel Shipp 12-yard run (Matt Murphy kick), 14:48. Minutemen 28–12. Drive: 9 plays, 69 yards, 3:12.
- JMU – Craig Akins 4-yard pass from Greg Maddox (Greg Maddox pass to Craig Akins), 5:36. Minutemen 28–20. Drive: 5 plays, 54 yards, 1:59.
- JMU – Delvin Joyce 9-yard run (pass failed), 0:58. Minutemen 28–26. Drive: 9 plays, 80 yards, 1:57.

| Statistics | JMU | MASS |
|---|---|---|
| First downs | 23 | 16 |
| Plays–yards | 81–432 | 60–359 |
| Rushes–yards | 45–167 | 36–172 |
| Passing yards | 265 | 187 |
| Passing: comp–att–int | 21–36–1 | 11–24–1 |
| Turnovers | 2 | 2 |
| Time of possession | 36:56 | 23:04 |

| Team | Category | Player | Statistics |
|---|---|---|---|
| James Madison | Passing | Greg Maddox | 21/36, 265 yards, TD, INT |
| James Madison | Rushing | Delvin Joyce | 20 rushes, 104 yards, 2 TD |
| James Madison | Receiving | Earnest Payton | 13 receptions, 155 yards |
| UMass | Passing | Todd Bankhead | 11/23, 187 yards, 2 TD, INT |
| UMass | Rushing | Marcel Shipp | 24 rushes, 190 yards, TD |
| UMass | Receiving | Jimmy Moore | 5 receptions, 109 yards, TD |

=== At No. 15 Connecticut ===
No. 18 UMass Minutemen at No. 15 Connecticut Huskies – Game summary

| Quarter | 1 | 2 | Total |
|---|---|---|---|
| No. 18 Minutemen | | | 0 |
| No. 15 Huskies | | | 0 |

at Memorial Stadium • Storrs, Connecticut

- Date: October 17
- Game time: 1:30 p.m. EDT
- Game attendance: 8,581

| Statistics | MASS | CONN |
|---|---|---|
| First downs | | |
| Plays–yards | | |
| Rushes–yards | | |
| Passing yards | | |
| Passing: comp–att–int | | |
| Turnovers | | |
| Time of possession | | |

| Team | Category | Player | Statistics |
|---|---|---|---|
| UMass | Passing | | |
| UMass | Rushing | | |
| UMass | Receiving | | |
| Connecticut | Passing | | |
| Connecticut | Rushing | | |
| Connecticut | Receiving | | |

=== No. 22 Villanova ===
No. 22 Villanova Wildcats at No. 19 UMass Minutemen – Game summary

| Quarter | 1 | 2 | Total |
|---|---|---|---|
| No. 22 Wildcats | | | 0 |
| No. 19 Minutemen | | | 0 |

at Warren McGuirk Alumni Stadium • Hadley, Massachusetts

- Date: October 24
- Game time: 1:00 p.m. EDT
- Game attendance: 12,135

| Statistics | VILL | MASS |
|---|---|---|
| First downs | | |
| Plays–yards | | |
| Rushes–yards | | |
| Passing yards | | |
| Passing: comp–att–int | | |
| Turnovers | | |
| Time of possession | | |

| Team | Category | Player | Statistics |
|---|---|---|---|
| Villanova | Passing | | |
| Villanova | Rushing | | |
| Villanova | Receiving | | |
| UMass | Passing | | |
| UMass | Rushing | | |
| UMass | Receiving | | |

=== At New Hampshire ===
No. 16 UMass Minutemen at New Hampshire Wildcats – Game summary

| Quarter | 1 | 2 | Total |
|---|---|---|---|
| No. 16 Minutemen | | | 0 |
| Wildcats | | | 0 |

at Cowell Stadium • Durham, New Hampshire

- Date: October 31
- Game time: 12:30 p.m. EST
- Game attendance: 3,578

| Statistics | MASS | NH |
|---|---|---|
| First downs | | |
| Plays–yards | | |
| Rushes–yards | | |
| Passing yards | | |
| Passing: comp–att–int | | |
| Turnovers | | |
| Time of possession | | |

| Team | Category | Player | Statistics |
|---|---|---|---|
| UMass | Passing | | |
| UMass | Rushing | | |
| UMass | Receiving | | |
| New Hampshire | Passing | | |
| New Hampshire | Rushing | | |
| New Hampshire | Receiving | | |

=== At Rhode Island ===
No. 12 UMass Minutemen at Rhode Island Rams – Game summary

| Quarter | 1 | 2 | Total |
|---|---|---|---|
| No. 12 Minutemen | | | 0 |
| Rams | | | 0 |

at Meade Stadium • Kingston, Rhode Island

- Date: November 7
- Game time: 12:00 p.m. EST
- Game attendance: 5,036

| Statistics | MASS | URI |
|---|---|---|
| First downs | | |
| Plays–yards | | |
| Rushes–yards | | |
| Passing yards | | |
| Passing: comp–att–int | | |
| Turnovers | | |
| Time of possession | | |

| Team | Category | Player | Statistics |
|---|---|---|---|
| UMass | Passing | | |
| UMass | Rushing | | |
| UMass | Receiving | | |
| Rhode Island | Passing | | |
| Rhode Island | Rushing | | |
| Rhode Island | Receiving | | |

=== Maine ===
Maine Black Bears at No. 10 UMass Minutemen – Game summary

| Quarter | 1 | 2 | Total |
|---|---|---|---|
| Black Bears | | | 0 |
| No. 10 Minutemen | | | 0 |

at Warren McGuirk Alumni Stadium • Hadley, Massachusetts

- Date: November 14
- Game time: 12:30 p.m. EDT
- Game attendance: 10,355

| Statistics | ME | MASS |
|---|---|---|
| First downs | | |
| Plays–yards | | |
| Rushes–yards | | |
| Passing yards | | |
| Passing: comp–att–int | | |
| Turnovers | | |
| Time of possession | | |

| Team | Category | Player | Statistics |
|---|---|---|---|
| Maine | Passing | | |
| Maine | Rushing | | |
| Maine | Receiving | | |
| UMass | Passing | | |
| UMass | Rushing | | |
| UMass | Receiving | | |

=== No. 9 Connecticut ===
No. 9 Connecticut Huskies at No. 7 UMass Minutemen – Game summary

| Quarter | 1 | 2 | Total |
|---|---|---|---|
| No. 9 Connecticut | | | 0 |
| No. 7 Minutemen | | | 0 |

at Warren McGuirk Alumni Stadium • Hadley, Massachusetts

- Date: November 21
- Game time: 12:30 p.m. EDT
- Game attendance: 16,392

| Statistics | CONN | MASS |
|---|---|---|
| First downs | | |
| Plays–yards | | |
| Rushes–yards | | |
| Passing yards | | |
| Passing: comp–att–int | | |
| Turnovers | | |
| Time of possession | | |

| Team | Category | Player | Statistics |
|---|---|---|---|
| Connecticut | Passing | | |
| Connecticut | Rushing | | |
| Connecticut | Receiving | | |
| UMass | Passing | | |
| UMass | Rushing | | |
| UMass | Receiving | | |

=== At No. 6 McNesse State (Division I-AA First Round) ===
1998 Division I-AA Playoffs First Round
No. 12 UMass Minutemen at No. 6 McNeese State Cowboys – Game summary

| Quarter | 1 | 2 | Total |
|---|---|---|---|
| No. 12 Minutemen | | | 0 |
| No. 6 Cowboys | | | 0 |

at Cowboy Stadium • Lake Charles, Louisiana

- Date: November 28
- Game time: 7:00 p.m. EST
- Game attendance: 11,349

| Statistics | MASS | MCN |
|---|---|---|
| First downs | | |
| Plays–yards | | |
| Rushes–yards | | |
| Passing yards | | |
| Passing: comp–att–int | | |
| Turnovers | | |
| Time of possession | | |

| Team | Category | Player | Statistics |
|---|---|---|---|
| UMass | Passing | | |
| UMass | Rushing | | |
| UMass | Receiving | | |
| McNeese State | Passing | | |
| McNeese State | Rushing | | |
| McNeese State | Receiving | | |

=== No. 13 Lehigh (Division I-AA Quarterfinal) ===
1998 Division I-AA Quarterfinal
No. 13 Lehigh Mountain Hawks at No. 12 UMass Minutemen – Game summary

| Quarter | 1 | 2 | Total |
|---|---|---|---|
| No. 13 Mountain Hawks | | | 0 |
| No. 12 Minutemen | | | 0 |

at Warren McGuirk Alumni Stadium • Hadley, Massachusetts

- Date: December 5
- Game time: 12:00 p.m. EST
- Game attendance: 12,108

| Statistics | LEH | MASS |
|---|---|---|
| First downs | | |
| Plays–yards | | |
| Rushes–yards | | |
| Passing yards | | |
| Passing: comp–att–int | | |
| Turnovers | | |
| Time of possession | | |

| Team | Category | Player | Statistics |
|---|---|---|---|
| Lehigh | Passing | | |
| Lehigh | Rushing | | |
| Lehigh | Receiving | | |
| UMass | Passing | | |
| UMass | Rushing | | |
| UMass | Receiving | | |

=== At No. 2 Northwestern State (Division I-AA Semifinal) ===
1998 Division I-AA Playoffs Semifianl
No. 12 UMass Minutemen at No. 2 Northwestern State Demons – Game summary

| Quarter | 1 | 2 | Total |
|---|---|---|---|
| No. 12 Minutemen | | | 0 |
| No. 2 Demons | | | 0 |

at Harry Turpin Stadium • Natchitoches, Louisiana

- Date: December 12
- Game time: 2:00 p.m. EST / 1:00 p.m. CST
- Game attendance: 10,424

| Statistics | MASS | NWST |
|---|---|---|
| First downs | | |
| Plays–yards | | |
| Rushes–yards | | |
| Passing yards | | |
| Passing: comp–att–int | | |
| Turnovers | | |
| Time of possession | | |

| Team | Category | Player | Statistics |
|---|---|---|---|
| UMass | Passing | | |
| UMass | Rushing | | |
| UMass | Receiving | | |
| Northwestern State | Passing | | |
| Northwestern State | Rushing | | |
| Northwestern State | Receiving | | |

=== Vs. No. 1 Georgia Southern (Division I-AA Championship Game) ===
1998 Division I-AA Championship Game
No. 1 Georgia Southern Eagles vs. No. 12 UMass Minutemen – Game summary

| Quarter | 1 | 2 | 3 | 4 | Total |
|---|---|---|---|---|---|
| No. 1 Eagles | 7 | 14 | 12 | 10 | 43 |
| No. 12 Minutemen | 21 | 17 | 0 | 17 | 55 |

at Finley Stadium • Chattanooga, Tennessee

- Date: December 19
- Game time: 2:00 p.m. EST
- Game attendance: 17,501
- Referee: John W. Keys
- TV: ESPN

Game information
First quarter
- MASS – Marcel Shipp 25-yard run (Jason Cherry kick), 12:56. Minutemen 7–0. Drive: 7 plays, 67 yards, 2:04.
- MASS – Kole Ayi 9-yard fumble return (Jason Cherry kick), 8:29. Minutemen 14–0.
- GASO – Greg Hill 40-yard run (Chris Chambers kick), 7:25. Minutemen 14–7. Drive: 2 plays, 48 yards, 1:08.
- MASS – Adrian Zullo 7-yard pass from Jamie Holston (Jason Cherry kick), 5:04. Minutemen 21–7. Drive: 1 play, 7 yards, 0:07.

Second quarter

- MASS – Jason Cherry 22-yard field goal, 14:46. Minutemen 24–7. Drive: 11 plays, 63 yards, 3:34.
- GASO – Corey Joyner 6-yard pass from Greg Hill (Chris Chambers kick), 10:54. Minutemen 24–14. Drive: 6 plays, 36 yards, 2:11.
- MASS – Todd Bankhead 1-yard run (Jason Cherry kick), 7:17. Minutemen 31–14. Drive: 11 plays, 64 yards, 3:37.
- MASS – Marcel Shipp 4-yard run (Jason Cherry kick), 4:09. Minutemen 38–14. Drive: 5 plays, 26 yards, 1:35.
- GASO – Adrian Peterson 1-yard run (Chris Chambers kick), 2:01. Minutemen 38–21. Drive: 6 plays, 55 yards, 2:08.

Third quarter

- GASO – Adrian Peterson 5-yard run (kick failed), 8:54. Minutemen 38–27. Drive: 13 plays, 78 yards, 6:06.
- GASO – Greg Hill 2-yard run (run failed), 0:41. Minutemen 38–33. Drive: 14 plays, 98 yards, 6:07.

Fourth quarter

- MASS – Kevin Quinlan 2-yard run (Jason Cherry kick), 13:42. Minutemen 45–33. Drive: 5 plays, 72 yards, 1:59.
- MASS – Marcel Shipp 2-yard run (Jason Cherry kick), 11:51. Minutemen 52–33. Drive: 5 plays, 42 yards, 1:35.
- GASO – Chris Chambers 38-yard field goal, 8:39. Minutemen 52–36. Drive: 12 plays, 58 yards, 3:12.
- MASS – Jason Cherry 25-yard field goal, 2:21. Minutemen 55–36. Drive: 7 plays, 13 yards, 3:04.
- GASO – J. R. Revere 29-yard run (Chris Chambers kick), 1:04. Minutemen 55–43. Drive: 8 plays, 60 yards, 1:17.

| Statistics | GASO | MASS |
|---|---|---|
| First downs | 26 | 23 |
| Plays–yards | 86–595 | 77–462 |
| Rushes–yards | 65–457 | 51–303 |
| Passing yards | 138 | 159 |
| Passing: comp–att–int | 10–21–1 | 18–26–0 |
| Turnovers | 7 | 2 |
| Time of possession | 30:48 | 29:12 |

| Team | Category | Player | Statistics |
|---|---|---|---|
| Georgia Southern | Passing | Greg Hill | 8/16, 111 yards, TD, INT |
| Georgia Southern | Rushing | Greg Hill | 29 rushes, 228 yards, 2 TD |
| Georgia Southern | Receiving | Corey Joyner | 6 receptions, 94 yards, TD |
| UMass | Passing | Todd Bankhead | 17/25, 152 yards |
| UMass | Rushing | Marcel Shipp | 35 rushes, 244 yards, 3 TD |
| UMass | Receiving | Jimmy Moore | 6 receptions, 63 yards |

== Notable team members ==
Offense

- QB: Todd Bankhead
- RB: Marcel Shipp

Defense

- LB: Kole Ayi, Khari Samuel
- DB: Brian Smith
- Roster
