= 2005 Arizona Cardinals season =

NFL team season

- Owner: Bill Bidwill
- General manager: Rod Graves
- Head coach: Dennis Green
- Home stadium: Sun Devil Stadium

Results
- Record: 5–11
- Division place: 3rd NFC West
- Playoffs: Did not qualify
- Pro Bowlers: WR Larry Fitzgerald; K Neil Rackers

Uniform
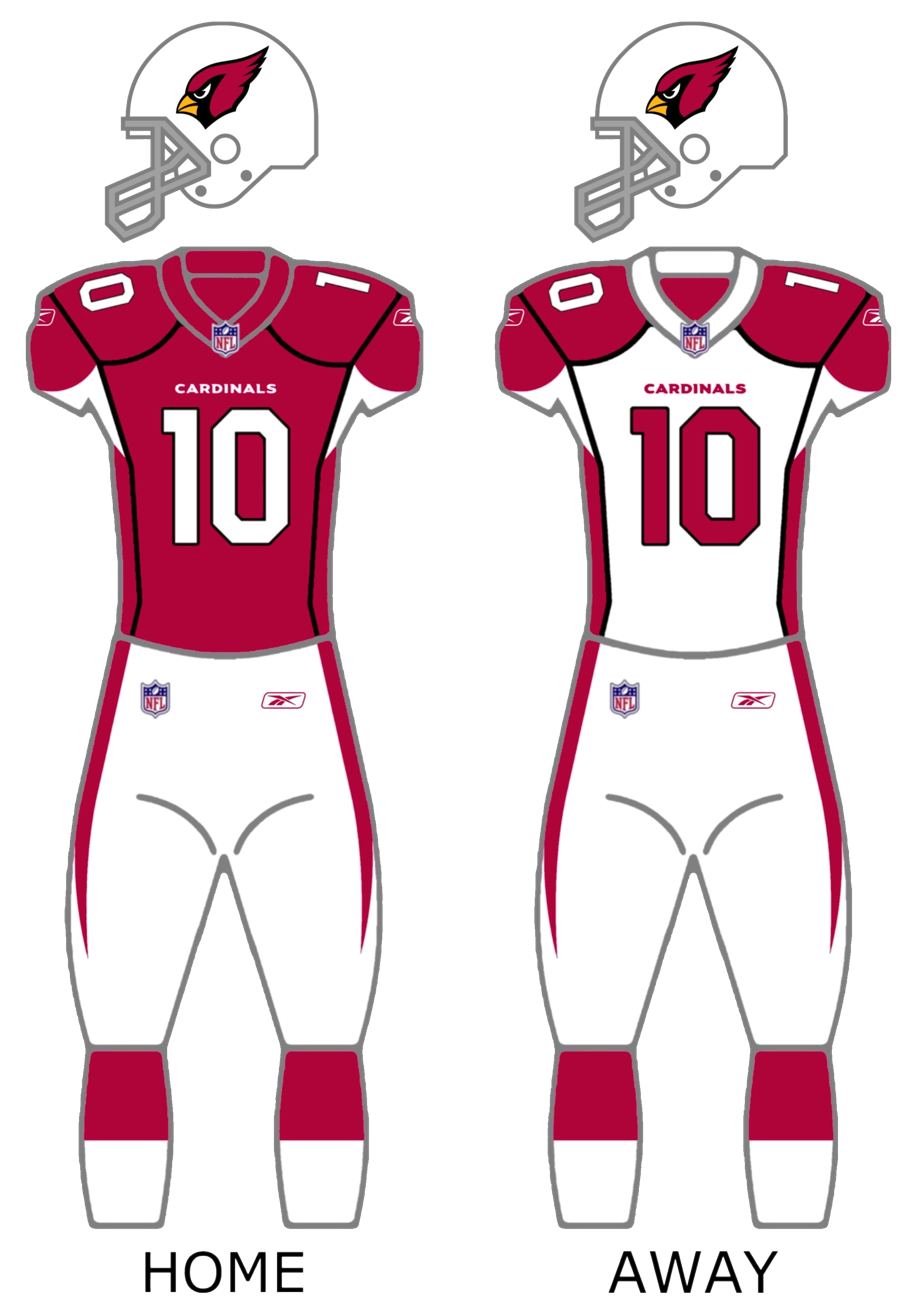

The 2005 season was the Arizona Cardinals' 86th in the National Football League (NFL), their 107th overall and their 18th in Arizona. The team was unable to improve upon their 6–10 record from the previous season, and failed to make the playoffs for the seventh year in a row.

The October 2 game was the first regular season game to be played outside the United States and was known as NFL Futbol Americano. The game was a Cardinals home game, and the Cardinals defeated their division rivals, the San Francisco 49ers, 31–14. For the first time since moving to the NFC West in 2002, the Cardinals swept division rivals the 49ers and won in Candlestick Park for the first time since 1978.

The Cardinals, as a team, had a paltry 1,138 rushing yards in 2005, only 71.1 yards per game with only 2 rushing touchdowns all season. Remarkably, the Cardinals only had one 100-yard rushing game, when they ran for 129 yards in the season finale against the Indianapolis Colts. Arizona's season total is the fifth-fewest rushing yards by a team in a 16-game season.

The Cardinals passing offense, however, led the league, with 4,437 yards. Kurt Warner's 271.3 passing yards per game were third in the NFL, and his 24.2 pass completions per-game led the league. Wide receiver Larry Fitzgerald tied for the league lead in receptions, with 103, edging out his teammate Anquan Boldin, who had 102 (tied for third in the NFL) Fitzgerald's 1,409 yards, and Boldin’s 1,402 yards receiving were fourth and fifth in the NFL, respectively, in 2005. Boldin’s 100.1 receiving yards per game led the NFL.

The season also saw the Cardinals change their logo and uniforms, which remained until 2023. It was also their final season playing at Sun Devil Stadium. For the 2006 season, the Cardinals moved to their new stadium, the University of Phoenix Stadium, now Cardinals Stadium, in Glendale, where they still play to this day.

== Offseason ==
=== NFL draft ===
2005 Arizona Cardinals draft
Round	Pick	Player	Position	College	Notes
1	8	Antrel Rolle	Cornerback	Miami (FL)	
2	44	J.J. Arrington	Running back	California	
3	75	Eric Green	Cornerback	Virginia Tech	
3	95	Darryl Blackstock	Linebacker	Virginia	
4	111	Elton Brown	Guard	Virginia	
5	168	Lance Mitchell	Linebacker	Oklahoma	
7	226	LeRon McCoy	Wide Receiver	Indiana (PA)	
Made roster † Pro Football Hall of Fame * Made at least one Pro Bowl during career

== Personnel ==
=== Staff ===
2005 Arizona Cardinals staff
Front office: President – Bill Bidwill; Vice president and general counsel – Michael Bidwill; Vice president of football operations – Rod Graves; Senior director of football operations – John Idzik, Jr.; Head coaches: Head coach – Dennis Green; Offensive coaches: Offensive coordinator – Keith Rowen; Quarterbacks – Mike Kruczek; Running backs – Kirby Wilson; Wide receivers – Mike Wilson; Tight ends – Carl Hargrave; Offensive line – Everett Lindsay; Offensive quality control – Bill Khayat	Defensive coaches: Defensive coordinator – Clancy Pendergast; Defensive line – Deek Pollard; Linebackers – Frank Bush; Defensive backs – Richard Solomon; Defensive quality control – Rick Courtright; Special teams coaches: Special teams – Kevin O'Dea; Strength and conditioning: Strength and conditioning – Steve Wetzel; Assistant strength and conditioning – Ryan Capretta; Assistant strength and conditioning – Daryl Lawrence

=== Roster ===
2005 Arizona Cardinals roster
Quarterbacks (QB): 6 Rohan Davey; 12 Josh McCown; 16 John Navarre; Running backs (RB): 22 Damien Anderson; 28 J. J. Arrington; 30 Obafemi Ayanbadejo FB; 32 James Jackson; 33 Harold Morrow FB; 31 Marcel Shipp; Wide receivers (WR): 81 Anquan Boldin; 11 Larry Fitzgerald; 15 Carlyle Holiday; 80 Bryant Johnson; 19 LeRon McCoy; 87 Reggie Swinton; Tight ends (TE): 89 Adam Bergen; 83 Eric Edwards	Offensive linemen (OL): 73 Jeremy Bridges G; 61 Elton Brown G; 69 Rolando Cantú OT; 75 Leonard Davis OT; 60 Nick Leckey C; 65 Shawn Lynch C; 79 Oliver Ross OT; 78 Fred Wakefield OT/G; Defensive linemen (DL): 93 Tim Bulman DT; 90 Darnell Dockett DT; 72 Ross Kolodziej DT; 56 Chike Okeafor DE; 70 Anton Palepoi DE; 67 Antonio Smith DE; 96 R-Kal Truluck DE	Linebackers (LB): 55 Darryl Blackstock OLB; 58 Karlos Dansby OLB; 51 James Darling MLB; 57 Orlando Huff OLB; 53 Isaac Keys OLB; 52 Lance Mitchell MLB; Defensive backs (DB): 22 Dyshod Carter CB; 47 Aaron Francisco SS; 25 Eric Green CB; 34 Robert Griffith FS; 29 Quentin Harris FS; 27 David Macklin CB; 21 Antrel Rolle CB; 35 Ernest Shazor SS; 26 Robert Tate CB; 23 Raymond Walls CB; 24 Adrian Wilson SS; Special teams (ST): 48 Nathan Hodel LS; 3 Nick Novak K; 10 Scott Player P; 1 Neil Rackers K	Practice squad: 18 Zamir Cobb WR; 68 Dante Ellington OT; 84 Ben Hall TE; 62 Tyler King DE; 66 Alan Reuber G; 14 Dan Sheldon WR; 44 Andy Stokes TE; Reserve: 76 Ian Allen OT (IR); 92 Bertrand Berry DE (IR); 85 John Bronson TE (IR); 63 Bill Conaty C (IR); 98 Russell Davis DT (IR); 64 Adam Haayer G (IR); 54 Gerald Hayes LB (IR); 42 James Hodgins FB (IR); 95 Kenny King DT (IR); 91 Langston Moore DT (IR); 97 Calvin Pace DE (NF-inj.); 36 J. R. Redmond RB (IR); 20 Lamont Reid CB (IR); 71 Alex Stepanovich C (IR); 13 Kurt Warner QB (IR); 74 Reggie Wells G (IR); Rookies in italics 53 active, 16 reserve, 7 practice squad

== Regular season ==
=== Schedule ===
In the 2005 regular season, the Cardinals’ non-divisional, conference opponents were primarily from the NFC East, although they also played the Carolina Panthers from the NFC South, and the Detroit Lions from the NFC North. Their non-conference opponents were from the AFC South.

Week	Date	Opponent	Result	Record	Venue	Attendance
1	September 11	at New York Giants	**L** 19–42	0–1	Giants Stadium	78,387
2	September 18	**St. Louis Rams**	**L** 12–17	0–2	Sun Devil Stadium	45,160
3	September 25	at **Seattle Seahawks**	**L** 12–37	0–3	Qwest Field	64,843
4	October 2	**San Francisco 49ers**	**W** 31–14	1–3	Estadio Azteca (Mexico City)	103,467
5	October 9	Carolina Panthers	**L** 20–24	1–4	Sun Devil Stadium	38,809
6	Bye					
7	October 23	Tennessee Titans	**W** 20–10	2–4	Sun Devil Stadium	39,482
8	October 30	at Dallas Cowboys	**L** 13–34	2–5	Texas Stadium	62,068
9	November 6	**Seattle Seahawks**	**L** 19–33	2–6	Sun Devil Stadium	43,542
10	November 13	at Detroit Lions	**L** 21–29	2–7	Ford Field	61,091
11	November 20	at **St. Louis Rams**	**W** 38–28	3–7	Edward Jones Dome	65,750
12	November 27	Jacksonville Jaguars	**L** 17–24	3–8	Sun Devil Stadium	39,198
13	December 4	at **San Francisco 49ers**	**W** 17–10	4–8	Monster Park	60,439
14	December 11	Washington Redskins	**L** 13–17	4–9	Sun Devil Stadium	46,654
15	December 18	at Houston Texans	**L** 19–30	4–10	Reliant Stadium	70,024
16	December 24	Philadelphia Eagles	**W** 27–21	5–10	Sun Devil Stadium	44,723
17	January 1	at Indianapolis Colts	**L** 13–17	5–11	RCA Dome	57,211

Note: Intra-division opponents are in bold text.

=== Season summary ===
==== Week 1: at New York Giants ====
Week 1: Arizona Cardinals at New York Giants – Game summary

Quarter	1	2	3	4	Total
Cardinals	0	13	6	0	**19**
**Giants**	7	0	21	14	**42**

at Giants Stadium, East Rutherford, New Jersey

- Date: September 11
- Game time: 4:15 p.m. EST/2:15 p.m. MST
- Game weather: 85 °F (29 °C)
- Game attendance: 78,387
- Referee: Bernie Kukar
- TV announcers (FOX): Sam Rosen & Bill Maas
- Box Score

Game information

**First quarter**

- NYG – Jeremy Shockey 20-yard pass from Eli Manning (Jay Feely kick), 7:57. Giants 7–0. **Drive: 10 plays, 81 yards, 4:51.**

**Second quarter**

- ARI – Neil Rackers 24-yard field goal, 11:36. Giants 7–3. **Drive: 13 plays, 80 yards, 6:56.**
- ARI – Karlos Dansby 18-yard interception return (Neil Rackers kick), 11:14. Cardinals 10–7.
- ARI – Neil Rackers 24-yard field goal, 11:36. Cardinals 13–7. **Drive: 13 plays, 61 yards, 5:49.**

**Third quarter**

- NYG – Brandon Jacobs 5-yard run (Jay Feely kick), 12:13. Giants 14–13. **Drive: 4 plays, 63 yards, 2:47.**
- NYG – Tiki Barber 21-yard run (Jay Feely kick), 11:48. Giants 21–13. **Drive: 1 play, 21 yards, 0:06.**
- ARI – Larry Fitzgerald 1-yard pass from Kurt Warner (pass failed), 7:04. Giants 21–19. **Drive: 8 plays, 39 yards, 4:44.**
- NYG – Willie Ponder 95-yard kickoff return (Jay Feely kick), 6:45. Giants 28–19.

**Fourth quarter**

- NYG – Plaxico Burress 13-yard pass from Eli Manning (Jay Feely kick), 11:26. Giants 35–19. **Drive: 6 plays, 52 yards, 2:52.**
- NYG – Chad Morton 52-yard kickoff return (Jay Feely kick), 8:25. Giants 42–19.

**Top passers**

- ARI – Kurt Warner – 27/46, 264 yards, TD, INT
- NYG – Eli Manning – 10/23, 172 yards, 2 TD, 2 INT

**Top rushers**

- ARI – Kurt Warner – 3 rushes, 11 yards
- NYG – Tiki Barber – 13 rushes, 62 yards, TD

**Top receivers**

- ARI – Larry Fitzgerald – 13 receptions, 155 yards, TD
- NYG – Plaxico Burress – 5 receptions, 72 yards, TD

==== Week 2: vs. St. Louis Rams ====
Week 2: St. Louis Rams at Arizona Cardinals – Game summary

Quarter	1	2	3	4	Total
**Rams**	7	3	7	0	**17**
Cardinals	3	3	3	3	**12**

at Sun Devil Stadium, Tempe, Arizona

- Date: September 18
- Game time: 2:05 p.m. MST
- Game weather: 94 °F (34 °C)
- Game attendance: 45,160
- Referee: Jeff Triplette
- TV announcers (FOX): Ron Pitts & Tim Ryan
- Box Score

Game information

**First quarter**

- STL – Torry Holt 19-yard pass from Marc Bulger (Jeff Wilkins kick), 11:42. Rams 7–0. **Drive: 7 plays, 80 yards, 3:18.**
- ARI – Neil Rackers 29-yard field goal, 5:38. Rams 7–3. **Drive: 10 plays, 57 yards, 3:19.**

**Second quarter**

- ARI – Neil Rackers 26-yard field goal, 8:44. Rams 7–6. **Drive: 8 plays, 37 yards, 3:59.**
- STL – Jeff Wilkins 29-yard field goal, 3:42. Rams 10–6. **Drive: 10 plays, 69 yards, 5:02.**

**Third quarter**

- ARI – Neil Rackers 48-yard field goal, 10:23. Rams 10–9. **Drive: 9 plays, 45 yards, 4:37.**
- STL – Steven Jackson 7-yard run (Jeff Wilkins kick), 5:45. Rams 17–9. **Drive: 8 plays, 76 yards, 4:38.**

**Fourth quarter**

- ARI – Neil Rackers 35-yard field goal, 6:59. Rams 17–12. **Drive: 9 plays, 56 yards, 5:48.**

**Top passers**

- STL – Marc Bulger – 18/29, 216 yards, TD, INT
- ARI – Kurt Warner – 29/42, 327 yards, INT

**Top rushers**

- STL – Steven Jackson – 18 rushes, 93 yards, TD
- ARI – Marcel Shipp – 12 rushes, 54 yards

**Top receivers**

- STL – Torry Holt – 4 receptions, 70 yards, TD
- ARI – Anquan Boldin – 8 receptions, 119 yards

==== Week 3: at Seattle Seahawks ====
Week 3: Arizona Cardinals at Seattle Seahawks – Game summary

Quarter	1	2	3	4	Total
Cardinals	3	6	3	0	**12**
**Seahawks**	7	3	14	13	**37**

at Qwest Field, Seattle, Washington

- Date: September 25
- Game time: 1:05 p.m. PST/2:05 p.m. MST
- Game weather: 60 °F (16 °C)
- Game attendance: 64,843
- Referee: Tony Corrente
- TV announcers (FOX): Curt Menefee & J.C. Pearson
- Box Score

Game information

**First quarter**

- ARI – Neil Rackers 54-yard field goal, 9:46. Cardinals 3–0. **Drive: 9 plays, 27 yards, 5:14.**
- SEA – Shaun Alexander 25-yard run (Josh Brown kick), 4:20. Seahawks 7–3. **Drive: 10 plays, 80 yards, 5:26.**

**Second quarter**

- ARI – Neil Rackers 39-yard field goal, 14:07. Seahawks 7–6. **Drive: 10 plays, 57 yards, 5:13.**
- SEA – Josh Brown 33-yard field goal, 6:43. Seahawks 10–6. **Drive: 6 plays, 35 yards, 2:05.**
- ARI – Neil Rackers 50-yard field goal, 3:41. Seahawks 10–9. **Drive: 8 plays, 56 yards, 3:02.**

**Third quarter**

- SEA – Shaun Alexander 1-yard run (Josh Brown kick), 11:51. Seahawks 17–9. **Drive: 7 plays, 80 yards, 3:09.**
- SEA – Shaun Alexander 1-yard run (Josh Brown kick), 11:21. Seahawks 24–9. **Drive: 1 play, 1 yard, 0:04.**
- ARI – Neil Rackers 39-yard field goal, 5:06. Seahawks 24–12. **Drive: 7 plays, 36 yards, 3:13.**

**Fourth quarter**

- SEA – Shaun Alexander 1-yard run (Josh Brown kick), 14:56. Seahawks 31–12. **Drive: 9 plays, 80 yards, 5:10.**
- SEA – Josh Brown 23-yard field goal, 8:50. Seahawks 34–12. **Drive: 10 plays, 75 yards, 4:14.**
- SEA – Josh Brown 47-yard field goal, 1:28. Seahawks 37–12. **Drive: 12 plays, 53 yards, 6:20.**

**Top passers**

- ARI – Kurt Warner – 8/13, 105 yards
- SEA – Matt Hasselbeck – 20/31, 242 yards

**Top rushers**

- ARI – Marcel Shipp – 10 rushes, 41 yards
- SEA – Shaun Alexander – 22 rushes, 140 yards, 4 TD

**Top receivers**

- ARI – Anquan Boldin – 6 receptions, 88 yards
- SEA – Darrell Jackson – 8 receptions, 125 yards

==== Week 4: vs. San Francisco 49ers ====
Fútbol Americano

Week 4: San Francisco 49ers at Arizona Cardinals – Game summary

Quarter	1	2	3	4	Total
49ers	14	0	0	0	**14**
**Cardinals**	0	12	6	13	**31**

at Estadio Azteca, Mexico City, Mexico

- Date: October 2
- Game time: 7:35 p.m. CST/6:35 p.m. MST
- Game weather: 66 °F (19 °C)
- Game attendance: 103,467
- Referee: Ed Hochuli
- TV announcers (ESPN): Mike Patrick, Joe Theismann, Paul Maguire & Suzy Kolber
- Box Score

Game information

**First quarter**

- SF – Derek Smith 0-yard fumble return (Joe Nedney kick), 14:51. 49ers 7–0.
- SF – Derrick Johnson 78-yard fumble return (Joe Nedney kick), 7:57. 49ers 14–0.

**Second quarter**

- ARI – Neil Rackers 40-yard field goal, 8:46. 49ers 14–3. **Drive: 12 plays, 66 yards, 4:56.**
- ARI – Neil Rackers 45-yard field goal, 2:44. 49ers 14–6. **Drive: 8 plays, 50 yards, 3:55.**
- ARI – Larry Fitzgerald 17-yard pass from Josh McCown (pass failed), 0:05. 49ers 14–12. **Drive: 7 plays, 69 yards, 1:03.**

**Third quarter**

- ARI – Neil Rackers 48-yard field goal, 8:57. Cardinals 15–14. **Drive: 6 plays, 47 yards, 3:17.**
- ARI – Neil Rackers 23-yard field goal, 2:41. Cardinals 18–14. **Drive: 8 plays, 44 yards, 4:04.**

**Fourth quarter**

- ARI – Neil Rackers 43-yard field goal, 13:14. Cardinals 21–14. **Drive: 7 plays, 26 yards, 3:02.**
- ARI – Anquan Boldin 27-yard pass from Josh McCown (Neil Rackers kick), 8:29. Cardinals 28–14. **Drive: 5 plays, 35 yards, 2:47.**
- ARI – Neil Rackers 24-yard field goal, 6:00. Cardinals 31–14. **Drive: 4 plays, 7 yards, 1:41.**

**Top passers**

- SF – Tim Rattay – 11/21, 126 yards, INT
- ARI – Josh McCown – 32/46, 385 yards, 2 TD

**Top rushers**

- SF – Kevan Barlow – 10 rushes, 45 yards
- ARI – Marcel Shipp – 16 rushes, 42 yards

**Top receivers**

- SF – Brandon Lloyd – 7 receptions, 102 yards
- ARI – Anquan Boldin – 8 receptions, 116 yards, TD

==== Week 5: vs. Carolina Panthers ====
Week 5: Carolina Panthers at Arizona Cardinals – Game summary

Quarter	1	2	3	4	Total
**Panthers**	3	7	0	14	**24**
Cardinals	0	17	3	0	**20**

at Sun Devil Stadium, Tempe, Arizona

- Date: October 9
- Game time: 2:15 p.m. MST
- Game weather: 81 °F (27 °C)
- Game attendance: 38,809
- Referee: Gerry Austin
- TV announcers (FOX): Matt Vasgersian & Erik Kramer
- Box Score

Game information

**First quarter**

- CAR – John Kasay 46-yard field goal, 5:41. Panthers 3–0. **Drive: 4 plays, 2 yards, 1:56.**

**Second quarter**

- ARI – Larry Fitzgerald 26-yard pass from Josh McCown (Neil Rackers kick), 14:55. Cardinals 7–3. **Drive: 3 plays, 26 yards, 0:50.**
- CAR – Steve Smith Sr. 65-yard pass from Jake Delhomme (John Kasay kick), 12:29. Panthers 10–7. **Drive: 4 plays, 80 yards, 2:26.**
- ARI – Neil Rackers 39-yard field goal, 10:26. Tied 10–10. **Drive: 6 plays, 57 yards, 2:03.**
- ARI – Anquan Boldin 20-yard pass from Josh McCown (Neil Rackers kick), 5:08. Cardinals 17–10. **Drive: 6 plays, 90 yards, 3:27.**

**Third quarter**

- ARI – Neil Rackers 49-yard field goal, 5:11. Cardinals 20–10. **Drive: 12 plays, 44 yards, 6:54.**

**Fourth quarter**

- CAR – Stephen Davis 1-yard run (John Kasay kick), 14:57. Cardinals 20–17. **Drive: 2 plays, 5 yards, 0:30.**
- CAR – Steve Smith Sr. 4-yard pass from Jake Delhomme (John Kasay kick), 6:54. Panthers 24–20. **Drive: 10 plays, 94 yards, 5:00.**

**Top passers**

- CAR – Jake Delhomme – 18/29, 243 yards, 2 TD, INT
- ARI – Josh McCown – 29/46, 398 yards, 2 TD, 3 INT

**Top rushers**

- CAR – Stephen Davis – 18 rushes, 46 yards, TD
- ARI – Josh McCown – 5 rushes, 29 yards

**Top receivers**

- CAR – Steve Smith Sr. – 8 receptions, 119 yards, 2 TD
- ARI – Anquan Boldin – 10 receptions, 162 yards, TD

==== Week 7: vs. Tennessee Titans ====
Week 7: Tennessee Titans at Arizona Cardinals – Game summary

Quarter	1	2	3	4	Total
Titans	10	0	0	0	**10**
**Cardinals**	0	10	3	7	**20**

at Sun Devil Stadium, Tempe, Arizona

- Date: October 23
- Game time: 2:15 p.m. MST
- Game weather: 83 °F (28 °C)
- Game attendance: 39,482
- Referee: Larry Nemmers
- TV announcers (CBS): Craig Bolerjack & Rich Baldinger
- Box Score

Game information

**First quarter**

- TEN – Brandon Jones 38-yard pass from Billy Volek (Rob Bironas kick), 11:39. Titans 7–0. **Drive: 6 plays, 80 yards, 3:21.**
- TEN – Rob Bironas 53-yard field goal, 2:42. Titans 10–0. **Drive: 9 plays, 26 yards, 5:09.**

**Second quarter**

- ARI – Neil Rackers 33-yard field goal, 9:23. Titans 10–3. **Drive: 4 plays, 6 yards, 0:38.**
- ARI – David Macklin 60-yard interception return (Neil Rackers kick), 4:44. Tied 10–10.

**Third quarter**

- ARI – Neil Rackers 24-yard field goal, 0:29. Cardinals 13–10. **Drive: 10 plays, 59 yards, 6:14.**

**Fourth quarter**

- ARI – Larry Fitzgerald 34-yard pass from Josh McCown (Neil Rackers kick), 5:20. Cardinals 20–10. **Drive: 3 plays, 34 yards, 1:10.**

**Top passers**

- TEN – Billy Volek – 18/32, 198 yards, TD, INT
- ARI – Josh McCown – 12/28, 140 yards, TD, INT

**Top rushers**

- TEN – Chris Brown – 10 rushes, 37 yards
- ARI – J.J. Arrington – 5 rushes, 30 yards

**Top receivers**

- TEN – Erron Kinney – 5 receptions, 60 yards
- ARI – Larry Fitzgerald – 4 receptions, 71 yards, TD

==== Week 8: at Dallas Cowboys ====
Week 8: Arizona Cardinals at Dallas Cowboys – Game summary

Quarter	1	2	3	4	Total
Cardinals	3	7	3	0	**13**
**Cowboys**	10	14	3	7	**34**

at Texas Stadium, Irving, Texas

- Date: October 30
- Game time: 12:00 p.m. CST/11:00 a.m. MST
- Game weather: 71 °F (22 °C)
- Game attendance: 62,068
- Referee: Mike Carey
- TV announcers (FOX): Matt Vasgersian & Brian Baldinger
- Box Score

Game information

**First quarter**

- ARI – Neil Rackers 52-yard field goal, 9:43. Cardinals 3–0. **Drive: 10 plays, 43 yards, 5:17.**
- DAL – Marion Barber III 28-yard run (Shaun Suisham kick), 8:36. Cowboys 7–3. **Drive: 3 plays, 80 yards, 1:07.**
- DAL – Shaun Suisham 21-yard field goal, 2:57. Cowboys 10–3. **Drive: 10 plays, 54 yards, 4:40.**

**Second quarter**

- ARI – Anquan Boldin 44-yard pass from Josh McCown (Neil Rackers kick), 12:53. Tied 10–10. **Drive: 11 plays, 77 yards, 5:04.**
- DAL – Keyshawn Johnson 5-yard pass from Drew Bledsoe (Shaun Suisham kick), 3:11. Cowboys 17–10. **Drive: 11 plays, 75 yards, 6:28.**
- DAL – Marion Barber III 10-yard run (Shaun Suisham kick), 1:00. Cowboys 24–10. **Drive: 6 plays, 59 yards, 1:03.**

**Third quarter**

- ARI – Neil Rackers 47-yard field goal, 11:13. Cowboys 24–13. **Drive: 4 plays, 9 yards, 2:02.**
- DAL – Shaun Suisham 21-yard field goal, 3:03. Cowboys 27–13. **Drive: 14 plays, 68 yards, 8:10.**

**Fourth quarter**

- DAL – Anthony Henry 58-yard interception return (Shaun Suisham kick), 3:03. Cowboys 34–13.

**Top passers**

- ARI – Josh McCown – 16/33, 161 yards, TD, 2 INT
- DAL – Drew Bledsoe – 19/24, 220 yards, TD

**Top rushers**

- ARI – Marcel Shipp – 12 rushes, 44 yards
- DAL – Marion Barber III – 27 rushes, 127 yards, 2 TD

**Top receivers**

- ARI – Anquan Boldin – 3 receptions, 69 yards, TD
- DAL – Jason Witten – 5 receptions, 71 yards

==== Week 9: vs. Seattle Seahawks ====
Week 9: Seattle Seahawks at Arizona Cardinals – Game summary

Quarter	1	2	3	4	Total
**Seahawks**	3	14	10	6	**33**
Cardinals	3	3	10	3	**19**

at Sun Devil Stadium, Tempe, Arizona

- Date: November 6
- Game time: 2:05 p.m. MST
- Game weather: 79 °F (26 °C)
- Game attendance: 43,542
- Referee: Walt Anderson
- TV announcers (FOX): Ron Pitts & Tim Ryan
- Box Score

Game information

**First quarter**

- ARI – Neil Rackers 23-yard field goal, 7:56. Cardinals 3–0. **Drive: 13 plays, 67 yards, 7:04.**
- SEA – Josh Brown 26-yard field goal, 1:00. Tied 3–3. **Drive: 12 plays, 63 yards, 6:56.**

**Second quarter**

- SEA – Joe Jurevicius 4-yard pass from Matt Hasselbeck (Josh Brown kick), 13:00. Seahawks 10–3. **Drive: 6 plays, 41 yards, 2:43.**
- ARI – Neil Rackers 31-yard field goal, 6:16. Seahawks 10–6. **Drive: 12 plays, 61 yards, 6:44.**
- SEA – Matt Hasselbeck 1-yard run (Josh Brown kick), 0:39. Seahawks 17–6. **Drive: 4 plays, 60 yards, 0:42.**

**Third quarter**

- SEA – Shaun Alexander 88-yard run (Josh Brown kick), 14:40. Seahawks 24–6. **Drive: 1 play, 88 yards, 0:20.**
- ARI – Neil Rackers 50-yard field goal, 10:29. Seahawks 24–9. **Drive: 7 plays, 39 yards, 4:11.**
- SEA – Josh Brown 28-yard field goal, 6:48. Seahawks 27–9. **Drive: 4 plays, 7 yards, 1:13.**
- ARI – Bryant Johnson 6-yard pass from Kurt Warner (Neil Rackers kick), 0:35. Seahawks 27–16. **Drive: 14 plays, 80 yards, 6:13.**

**Fourth quarter**

- ARI – Neil Rackers 44-yard field goal, 12:09. Seahawks 27–19. **Drive: 5 plays, 53 yards, 1:20.**
- SEA – Shaun Alexander 14-yard run (kick failed), 5:19. Seahawks 33–19. **Drive: 12 plays, 93 yards, 6:50.**

**Top passers**

- SEA – Matt Hasselbeck – 13/20, 162 yards, TD
- ARI – Kurt Warner – 29/48, 334 yards, TD, 3 INT

**Top rushers**

- SEA – Shaun Alexander – 23 rushes, 173 yards, 2 TD
- ARI – J.J. Arrington – 5 rushes, 40 yards

**Top receivers**

- SEA – Jerheme Urban – 1 reception, 46 yards
- ARI – Larry Fitzgerald – 8 receptions, 102 yards

==== Week 10: at Detroit Lions ====
Week 10: Arizona Cardinals at Detroit Lions – Game summary

Quarter	1	2	3	4	Total
Cardinals	0	3	8	10	**21**
**Lions**	9	10	7	3	**29**

at Ford Field, Detroit, Michigan

- Date: November 13
- Game time: 1:05 p.m. EST/11:05 a.m. MST
- Game weather: None (Indoor stadium)
- Game attendance: 61,091
- Referee: Scott Green
- TV announcers (FOX): Ron Pitts & Tim Ryan
- Box Score

Game information

**First quarter**

- DET – Roy Williams 7-yard pass from Joey Harrington (Jason Hanson kick), 11:17. Lions 7–0. **Drive: 7 plays, 59 yards, 3:43.**
- DET – Team safety, 2:46. Lions 9–0.

**Second quarter**

- DET – Roy Williams 21-yard pass from Joey Harrington (Jason Hanson kick), 11:13. Lions 16–0. **Drive: 5 plays, 60 yards, 3:21.**
- ARI – Neil Rackers 51-yard field goal, 5:33. Lions 16–3. **Drive: 13 plays, 44 yards, 5:40.**
- DET – Jason Hanson 26-yard field goal, 0:00. Lions 19–3. **Drive: 9 plays, 60 yards, 2:34.**

**Third quarter**

- ARI – J.J. Arrington 1-yard run (Obafemi Ayanbadejo run), 9:53. Lions 19–11. **Drive: 9 plays, 79 yards, 5:07.**
- DET – Roy Williams 29-yard pass from Joey Harrington (Jason Hanson kick), 6:03. Lions 26–11. **Drive: 6 plays, 72 yards, 3:50.**

**Fourth quarter**

- ARI – Neil Rackers 28-yard field goal, 14:09. Lions 26–14. **Drive: 9 plays, 67 yards, 3:48.**
- DET – Jason Hanson 20-yard field goal, 8:35. Lions 29–14. **Drive: 10 plays, 78 yards, 5:34.**
- ARI – Larry Fitzgerald 8-yard pass from Kurt Warner (Neil Rackers kick), 2:24. Lions 29–21. **Drive: 6 plays, 62 yards, 1:11.**

**Top passers**

- ARI – Kurt Warner – 29/45, 359 yards, TD
- DET – Joey Harrington – 21/31, 231 yards, 3 TD

**Top rushers**

- ARI – J.J. Arrington – 8 rushes, 24 yards, TD
- DET – Kevin Jones – 14 rushes, 81 yards

**Top receivers**

- ARI – Larry Fitzgerald – 9 receptions, 141 yards, TD
- DET – Roy Williams – 7 receptions, 117 yards, 3 TD

==== Week 11: at St. Louis Rams ====
Week 11: Arizona Cardinals at St. Louis Rams – Game summary

Quarter	1	2	3	4	Total
**Cardinals**	3	10	3	22	**38**
Rams	3	7	7	11	**28**

at Edward Jones Dome, St. Louis, Missouri

- Date: November 20
- Game time: 12:00 p.m. CST/11:00 a.m. MST
- Game weather: None (Indoor stadium)
- Game attendance: 65,750
- Referee: Terry McAulay
- TV announcers (FOX): Thom Brenneman & Neil O'Donnell
- Box Score

Game information

**First quarter**

- STL – Jeff Wilkins 47-yard field goal, 7:35. Rams 3–0. **Drive: 4 plays, 5 yards, 1:19.**
- ARI – Neil Rackers 32-yard field goal, 1:22. Tied 3–3. **Drive: 11 plays, 61 yards, 6:13.**

**Second quarter**

- STL – Torry Holt 22-yard pass from Marc Bulger (Jeff Wilkins kick), 14:07. Rams 10–3. **Drive: 6 plays, 80 yards, 2:15.**
- ARI – Anquan Boldin 13-yard pass from Kurt Warner (Neil Rackers kick), 8:53. Tied 10–10. **Drive: 12 plays, 59 yards, 5:14.**
- ARI – Neil Rackers 33-yard field goal, 0:26. Cardinals 13–10. **Drive: 9 plays, 60 yards, 1:24.**

**Third quarter**

- ARI – Neil Rackers 51-yard field goal, 11:09. Cardinals 16–10. **Drive: 8 plays, 47 yards, 3:51.**
- STL – Isaac Bruce 46-yard pass from Marc Bulger (Jeff Wilkins kick), 7:38. Rams 17–16. **Drive: 6 plays, 72 yards, 3:31.**

**Fourth quarter**

- ARI – Adam Bergen 9-yard pass from Kurt Warner (Kurt Warner–Anquan Boldin pass), 8:11. Cardinals 24–17. **Drive: 10 plays, 48 yards, 5:59.**
- STL – Jeff Wilkins 32-yard field goal, 3:35. Cardinals 24–20. **Drive: 10 plays, 55 yards, 4:36.**
- ARI – Larry Fitzgerald 7-yard pass from Kurt Warner (Neil Rackers kick), 3:11. Cardinals 31–20. **Drive: 2 plays, 5 yards, 0:24.**
- ARI – J.J. Arrington 7-yard run (Neil Rackers kick), 1:54. Cardinals 38–20. **Drive: 3 plays, 15 yards, 1:04.**
- STL – Kevin Curtis 26-yard pass from Jamie Martin (Jamie Martin–Arlen Harris pass), 0:35. Cardinals 38–28. **Drive: 4 plays, 60 yards, 1:19.**

**Top passers**

- ARI – Kurt Warner – 27/39, 285 yards, 3 TD
- STL – Marc Bulger – 19/24, 224 yards, 2 TD

**Top rushers**

- ARI – J.J. Arrington – 11 rushes, 45 yards, TD
- STL – Steven Jackson – 12 rushes, 6 yards

**Top receivers**

- ARI – Anquan Boldin – 8 receptions, 105 yards, TD
- STL – Torry Holt – 11 receptions, 129 yards, TD

==== Week 12: vs. Jacksonville Jaguars ====
Week 12: Jacksonville Jaguars at Arizona Cardinals – Game summary

Quarter	1	2	3	4	Total
**Jaguars**	7	3	7	7	**24**
Cardinals	0	0	3	14	**17**

at Sun Devil Stadium, Tempe, Arizona

- Date: November 27
- Game time: 2:05 p.m. MST
- Game weather: 58 °F (14 °C)
- Game attendance: 39,198
- Referee: Tom White
- TV announcers (CBS): Don Criqui & Steve Beuerlein
- Box Score

Game information

**First quarter**

- JAX – David Garrard 16-yard run (Josh Scobee kick), 2:45. Jaguars 7–0. **Drive: 10 plays, 67 yards, 7:43.**

**Second quarter**

- JAX – Josh Scobee 30-yard field goal, 2:59. Jaguars 10–0. **Drive: 9 plays, 53 yards, 3:26.**

**Third quarter**

- ARI – Neil Rackers 42-yard field goal, 4:00. Jaguars 10–3. **Drive: 13 plays, 47 yards, 5:54.**
- JAX – Derrick Wimbush 91-yard kickoff return (Josh Scobee kick), 3:43. Jaguars 17–3.

**Fourth quarter**

- ARI – Eric Edwards 1-yard pass from Kurt Warner (Neil Rackers kick), 13:34. Jaguars 17–10. **Drive: 9 plays, 81 yards, 5:04.**
- JAX – Greg Jones 25-yard run (Josh Scobee kick), 4:20. Jaguars 24–10. **Drive: 1 play, 25 yards, 0:07.**
- ARI – Larry Fitzgerald 5-yard pass from Kurt Warner (Neil Rackers kick), 2:56. Jaguars 24–17. **Drive: 4 plays, 77 yards, 1:24.**

**Top passers**

- JAX – David Garrard – 12/26, 115 yards
- ARI – Kurt Warner – 29/46, 315 yards, 2 TD, INT

**Top rushers**

- JAX – Greg Jones – 23 rushes, 78 yards, TD
- ARI – J.J. Arrington – 6 rushes, 39 yards

**Top receivers**

- JAX – Jimmy Smith – 7 receptions, 70 yards
- ARI – Anquan Boldin – 10 receptions, 115 yards

==== Week 13: at San Francisco 49ers ====
Week 13: Arizona Cardinals at San Francisco 49ers – Game summary

Quarter	1	2	3	4	Total
**Cardinals**	3	0	6	8	**17**
49ers	0	7	3	0	**10**

at Monster Park, San Francisco, California

- Date: December 4
- Game time: 1:05 p.m. PST/2:05 p.m. MST
- Game weather: 54 °F (12 °C)
- Game attendance: 60,439
- Referee: Walt Coleman
- TV announcers (FOX): Thom Brenneman & Tim Green
- Box Score

Game information

**First quarter**

- ARI – Nick Novak 30-yard field goal, 1:02. Cardinals 3–0. **Drive: 14 plays, 68 yards, 7:51.**

**Second quarter**

- SF – Maurice Hicks 1-yard run (Joe Nedney kick), 1:58. 49ers 7–3. **Drive: 6 plays, 85 yards, 3:13.**

**Third quarter**

- ARI – Nick Novak 35-yard field goal, 12:00. 49ers 7–6. **Drive: 8 plays, 58 yards, 3:00.**
- ARI – Nick Novak 19-yard field goal, 7:21. Cardinals 9–7. **Drive: 9 plays, 28 yards, 4:29.**
- SF – Joe Nedney 48-yard field goal, 0:06. 49ers 10–9. **Drive: 4 plays, -4 yards, 1:43.**

**Fourth quarter**

- ARI – Anquan Boldin 54-yard pass from Kurt Warner (Obafemi Ayanbadejo run), 10:45. Cardinals 17–10. **Drive: 3 plays, 44 yards, 0:43.**

**Top passers**

- ARI – Kurt Warner – 29/45, 345 yards, TD, 2 INT
- SF – Alex Smith – 16/24, 185 yards, 3 INT

**Top rushers**

- ARI – J.J. Arrington – 18 rushes, 59 yards
- SF – Frank Gore – 6 rushes, 22 yards

**Top receivers**

- ARI – Anquan Boldin – 11 receptions, 156 yards, TD
- SF – Johnnie Morton – 3 receptions, 66 yards

With their first win in San Francisco since 1978, the Cardinals secured their first divisional sweep over the 49ers since becoming part of the NFC West in 2002.

==== Week 14: vs. Washington Redskins ====
Week 14: Washington Redskins at Arizona Cardinals – Game summary

Quarter	1	2	3	4	Total
**Redskins**	0	3	14	0	**17**
Cardinals	0	10	3	0	**13**

at Sun Devil Stadium, Tempe, Arizona

- Date: December 11
- Game time: 2:05 p.m. MST
- Game weather: 66 °F (19 °C)
- Game attendance: 46,654
- Referee: Bill Leavy
- TV announcers (FOX): Curt Menefee & J.C. Pearson
- Box Score

Game information

**First quarter**

- No scoring plays

**Second quarter**

- WAS – John Hall 41-yard field goal, 14:50. Redskins 3–0. **Drive: 4 plays, 0 yards, 1:05.**
- ARI – LeRon McCoy 2-yard pass from Kurt Warner (Neil Rackers kick), 8:27. Cardinals 7–3. **Drive: 12 plays, 65 yards, 6:23.**
- ARI – Neil Rackers 44-yard field goal, 1:06. Cardinals 10–3. **Drive: 5 plays, 21 yards, 0:43.**

**Third quarter**

- WAS – Clinton Portis 15-yard run (John Hall kick), 7:20. Tied 10–10. **Drive: 13 plays, 80 yards, 7:40.**
- ARI – Neil Rackers 20-yard field goal, 3:40. Cardinals 13–10. **Drive: 11 plays, 66 yards, 3:40.**
- WAS – Antonio Brown 91-yard kickoff return (John Hall kick), 3:29. Redskins 17–13.

**Fourth quarter**

- No scoring plays

**Top passers**

- WAS – Mark Brunell – 18/28, 122 yards, 3 INT
- ARI – Kurt Warner – 25/41, 255 yards, TD, INT

**Top rushers**

- WAS – Clinton Portis – 26 rushes, 105 yards, TD
- ARI – Marcel Shipp – 7 rushes, 27 yards

**Top receivers**

- WAS – Santana Moss – 7 receptions, 56 yards
- ARI – Anquan Boldin – 9 receptions, 114 yards

==== Week 15: at Houston Texans ====
Week 15: Arizona Cardinals at Houston Texans – Game summary

Quarter	1	2	3	4	Total
Cardinals	3	7	0	9	**19**
**Texans**	0	24	3	3	**30**

at Reliant Stadium, Houston, Texas

- Date: December 18
- Game time: 12:00 p.m. CST/11:00 a.m. MST
- Game weather: None (Indoor stadium)
- Game attendance: 70,024
- Referee: Bill Vinovich
- TV announcers (FOX): Chris Myers & Terry Donahue
- Box Score

Game information

**First quarter**

- ARI – Neil Rackers 26-yard field goal, 3:43. Cardinals 3–0. **Drive: 11 plays, 42 yards, 6:48.**

**Second quarter**

- HOU – Jonathan Wells 7-yard run (Kris Brown kick), 14:23. Texans 7–3. **Drive: 9 plays, 46 yards, 4:20.**
- ARI – Anquan Boldin 20-yard pass from Kurt Warner (Neil Rackers kick), 10:16. Cardinals 10–7. **Drive: 7 plays, 81 yards, 4:07.**
- HOU – Vernand Morency 25-yard run (Kris Brown kick), 1:58. Texans 14–10. **Drive: 10 plays, 63 yards, 5:19.**
- HOU – Jonathan Wells 3-yard run (Kris Brown kick), 1:50. Texans 21–10. **Drive: 9 plays, 45 yards, 2:57.**
- HOU – Kris Brown 27-yard field goal, 0:08. Texans 24–10. **Drive: 8 plays, 29 yards, 1:10.**

**Third quarter**

- HOU – Kris Brown 41-yard field goal, 12:13. Texans 27–10. **Drive: 8 plays, 37 yards, 2:47.**

**Fourth quarter**

- ARI – Neil Rackers 42-yard field goal, 14:46. Texans 27–13. **Drive: 7 plays, 26 yards, 1:52.**
- ARI – Larry Fitzgerald 12-yard pass from John Navarre (kick failed), 10:16. Texans 27–19. **Drive: 6 plays, 58 yards, 3:14.**
- HOU – Kris Brown 26-yard field goal, 0:27. Texans 30–19. **Drive: 4 plays, 6 yards, 2:06.**

**Top passers**

- ARI – John Navarre – 14/24, 174 yards, TD, INT
- HOU – David Carr – 22/33, 150 yards, INT

**Top rushers**

- ARI – Marcel Shipp – 6 rushes, 28 yards
- HOU – Jonathan Wells – 28 rushes, 87 yards, 2 TD

**Top receivers**

- ARI – Anquan Boldin – 8 receptions, 134 yards, TD
- HOU – Andre Johnson – 7 receptions, 51 yards

==== Week 16: vs. Philadelphia Eagles ====
Week 16: Philadelphia Eagles at Arizona Cardinals – Game summary

Quarter	1	2	3	4	Total
Eagles	0	7	0	14	**21**
**Cardinals**	6	7	7	7	**27**

at Sun Devil Stadium, Tempe, Arizona

- Date: December 24
- Game time: 2:05 p.m. MST
- Game weather: 75 °F (24 °C)
- Game attendance: 44,723
- Referee: Bernie Kukar
- TV announcers (FOX): Ron Pitts & Tim Ryan
- Box Score

Game information

**First quarter**

- ARI – Neil Rackers 32-yard field goal, 7:24. Cardinals 3–0. **Drive: 7 plays, 37 yards, 3:03.**
- ARI – Neil Rackers 32-yard field goal, 3:34. Cardinals 6–0. **Drive: 5 plays, 47 yards, 1:54.**

**Second quarter**

- ARI – Karlos Dansby 11-yard interception return (Neil Rackers kick), 10:28. Cardinals 13–0.
- PHI – Mike McMahon 1-yard run (David Akers kick), 6:38. Cardinals 13–7. **Drive: 8 plays, 66 yards, 3:50.**

**Third quarter**

- ARI – Larry Fitzgerald 25-yard pass from Josh McCown (Neil Rackers kick), 10:36. Cardinals 20–7. **Drive: 7 plays, 76 yards, 4:24.**

**Fourth quarter**

- ARI – Anquan Boldin 20-yard pass from Josh McCown (Neil Rackers kick), 11:25. Cardinals 27–20. **Drive: 13 plays, 97 yards, 7:37.**
- PHI – Billy McMullen 21-yard pass from Mike McMahon (David Akers kick), 10:21. Cardinals 27–14. **Drive: 3 plays, 58 yards, 1:04.**
- PHI – Mike McMahon 1-yard run (David Akers kick), 0:26. Cardinals 27–21. **Drive: 6 plays, 49 yards, 1:19.**

**Top passers**

- PHI – Mike McMahon – 12/33, 151 yards, TD, INT
- ARI – Josh McCown – 27/38, 294 yards, 2 TD, INT

**Top rushers**

- PHI – Mike McMahon – 3 rushes, 21 yards, 2 TD
- ARI – Marcel Shipp – 13 rushes, 42 yards

**Top receivers**

- PHI – Reggie Brown – 6 receptions, 69 yards
- ARI – Larry Fitzgerald – 5 receptions, 93 yards, TD

==== Week 17: at Indianapolis Colts ====
Week 17: Arizona Cardinals at Indianapolis Colts – Game summary

Quarter	1	2	3	4	Total
Cardinals	0	3	7	3	**13**
**Colts**	7	3	7	0	**17**

at RCA Dome, Indianapolis, Indiana

- Date: January 1
- Game time: 1:00 p.m. EST/11:00 a.m. MST
- Game weather: None (Indoor stadium)
- Game attendance: 57,211
- Referee: Ron Winter
- TV announcers (FOX): Matt Vasgersian & Neil O'Donnell
- Box Score

Game information

**First quarter**

- IND – Ben Utecht 14-yard pass from Jim Sorgi (Mike Vanderjagt kick), 4:44. Colts 7–0. **Drive: 4 plays, 49 yards, 2:12.**

**Second quarter**

- ARI – Neil Rackers 28-yard field goal, 13:04. Colts 7–3. **Drive: 15 plays, 71 yards, 6:40.**
- IND – Mike Vanderjagt 44-yard field goal, 2:41. Colts 10–3. **Drive: 7 plays, 57 yards, 3:18.**

**Third quarter**

- IND – Troy Walters 18-yard pass from Jim Sorgi (Mike Vanderjagt kick), 11:26. Colts 17–3. **Drive: 5 plays, 52 yards, 1:50.**
- ARI – Larry Fitzgerald 25-yard pass from Josh McCown (Neil Rackers kick), 8:29. Colts 17–10. **Drive: 7 plays, 75 yards, 2:57.**

**Fourth quarter**

- ARI – Neil Rackers 42-yard field goal, 10:59. Colts 17–13. **Drive: 16 plays, 70 yards, 8:29.**

**Top passers**

- ARI – Josh McCown – 31/42, 297 yards, TD, INT
- IND – Jim Sorgi – 20/30, 207 yards, 2 TD, INT

**Top rushers**

- ARI – Marcel Shipp – 16 rushes, 57 yards
- IND – James Mungro – 1 rush, 7 yards

**Top receivers**

- ARI – Anquan Boldin – 8 receptions, 81 yards
- IND – Aaron Moorehead – 5 receptions, 59 yards

=== Standings ===
NFC West
	W	L	T	PCT	DIV	CONF	PF	PA	STK
^{(1)} Seattle Seahawks	13	3	0	.813	6–0	10–2	452	271	L1
St. Louis Rams	6	10	0	.375	1–5	3–9	363	429	W1
Arizona Cardinals	5	11	0	.313	3–3	4–8	311	387	L1
San Francisco 49ers	4	12	0	.250	2–4	3–9	239	428	W2
