= 1998 Delaware Fightin' Blue Hens football team =

American college football season

1998 Delaware Fightin' Blue Hens football
- Conference: Atlantic 10 Conference
- Mid-Atlantic Division

Ranking
- Sports Network: No. 22
- Record: 7–4 (4–4 A-10)
- Head coach: Tubby Raymond (33rd season)
- Offensive coordinator: Ted Kempski (31st season)
- Offensive scheme: Delaware Wing-T
- Defensive coordinator: Bob Sabol (8th season)
- Base defense: 4–3
- Home stadium: Delaware Stadium

1998 Atlantic 10 Conference football standings
	Conf.			Overall
Team	W		L	W		L
New England Division
No. 1 UMass x^	6	–	2	12	–	3
No. 9 Connecticut x^	6	–	2	10	–	3
Maine	3	–	5	6	–	5
New Hampshire	3	–	5	4	–	7
Rhode Island	2	–	6	3	–	8
Mid-Atlantic Division
No. 10 Richmond x$^	7	–	1	9	–	3
No. 23 Delaware	4	–	4	7	–	4
Villanova	4	–	4	6	–	5
No. 17 William & Mary	4	–	4	7	–	4
Northeastern	3	–	5	5	–	6
James Madison	2	–	6	3	–	8
$ – Conference champion; x – Division champion/co-champions; ^ – NCAA Division I-AA playoff participant; Rankings from The Sports Network poll

The 1998 Delaware Fightin' Blue Hens football team represented the University of Delaware as a member of the Mid-Atlantic Division of the Atlantic 10 Conference (A-10) during the 1998 NCAA Division I-AA football season. Led by 33rd-year head coach Tubby Raymond, the Fightin' Blue Hens compiled an overall record of 7–4 with a mark of 4–4 in conference play, placing in a three-way tie for second in the A-10's Mid-Atlantic Division. The team played home games at Delaware Stadium in Newark, Delaware.

== Schedule ==
Date	Opponent	Rank	Site	Result	Attendance	Source
September 3	UMass*	No. 3	Delaware Stadium; Newark, DE	W 33–30	20,744	
September 12	at No. 8 Villanova	No. 4	Villanova Stadium; Villanova PA (Battle of the Blue)	L 31–34 ^{OT}	10,160	
September 19	West Chester*	No. 9	Delaware Stadium; Newark, DE (rivalry)	W 42–21		
September 26	New Hampshire	No. 9	Delaware Stadium; Newark, DE	W 31–7		
October 3	Northeastern^{†}	No. 8	Delaware Stadium; Newark, DE	W 27–20		
October 10	at No. 12 William & Mary	No. 6	Zable Stadium; Williamsburg, VA (rivalry)	L 45–52	7,443	
October 17	at No. 6 Youngstown State*	No. 10	Stambaugh Stadium; Youngstown, OH	W 30–20	17,107	
October 31	Maine	No. 8	Delaware Stadium; Newark, DE	L 27–39		
November 7	at No. 5 Connecticut	No. 15	Memorial Stadium; Storrs, CT	W 59–17		
November 14	at No. 12 Richmond	No. 11	University of Richmond Stadium; Richmond, VA	L 6–45		
November 21	James Madison	No. 23	Delaware Stadium; Newark, DE (rivalry)	W 28–14	16,371	
*Non-conference game; ^{†}Homecoming; Rankings from The Sports Network Poll released prior to the game
