= List of IUP Crimson Hawks in the NFL draft =

This is a list of IUP Crimson Hawks football players in the NFL draft.

== Key ==
B	Back	K	Kicker	NT	Nose tackle
C	Center	LB	Linebacker	FB	Fullback
DB	Defensive back	P	Punter	HB	Halfback
DE	Defensive end	QB	Quarterback	WR	Wide receiver
DT	Defensive tackle	RB	Running back	G	Guard
E	End	T	Offensive tackle	TE	Tight end

= Pro Bowler
= Hall of Famer

== Selections ==
Year	Round	Pick	Player	Team	Position
1970	8	184	Dave Smith	Pittsburgh Steelers	WR
1976	15	425	Lynn Hieber	Cincinnati Bengals	QB
1979	2	51	Jim Haslett	Buffalo Bills	LB
1996	5	152	Chris Villarrial	Chicago Bears	G
2000	3	82	Leander Jordan	Carolina Panthers	T
2005	7	226	LeRon McCoy	Arizona Cardinals	WR
2010	4	126	Akwasi Owusu-Ansah	Dallas Cowboys	DB
