= 1998 Maine Black Bears football team =

American college football season

1998 Maine Black Bears football
- Conference: Atlantic 10 Conference
- New England Division
- Record: 6–5 (3–5 A-10)
- Head coach: Jack Cosgrove (6th season)
- Offensive coordinator: Joe Gilbert (3rd season)
- Defensive coordinator: Neil McGrath (4th season)
- Captains: Mickey Fein; Ves Lugo; Drew O'Connor
- Home stadium: Alfond Stadium

1998 Atlantic 10 Conference football standings
	Conf.			Overall
Team	W		L	W		L
New England Division
No. 1 UMass x^	6	–	2	12	–	3
No. 9 Connecticut x^	6	–	2	10	–	3
Maine	3	–	5	6	–	5
New Hampshire	3	–	5	4	–	7
Rhode Island	2	–	6	3	–	8
Mid-Atlantic Division
No. 10 Richmond x$^	7	–	1	9	–	3
No. 23 Delaware	4	–	4	7	–	4
Villanova	4	–	4	6	–	5
No. 17 William & Mary	4	–	4	7	–	4
Northeastern	3	–	5	5	–	6
James Madison	2	–	6	3	–	8
$ – Conference champion; x – Division champion/co-champions; ^ – NCAA Division I-AA playoff participant; Rankings from The Sports Network poll

The 1998 Maine Black Bears football team represented the University of Maine in the 1998 NCAA Division I-AA football season. They played their home games at Alfond Stadium as a member of the Atlantic 10 Conference. They were led by sixth-year head coach Jack Cosgrove. The Black Bears finished the season 6–5, 3–5 in conference play, to finish tied for third in the New England Division.

== Schedule ==
Date	Opponent	Site	Result	Attendance	Source
September 3	Buffalo*	Fitzpatrick Stadium; Portland, ME	W 30–13	4,998	
September 12	New Hampshire	Alfond Stadium; Orono, ME (Battle for the Brice-Cowell Musket)	W 52–28		
September 19	at No. 21 Connecticut	Memorial Stadium; Storrs, CT	L 27–35		
September 26	Dartmouth*	Alfond Stadium; Orono, ME	W 14–3	6,541	
October 3	No. 4 Villanova	Alfond Stadium; Orono, ME	W 44–10	4,791	
October 10	Rhode Island	Alfond Stadium; Orono, ME	L 17–18	3,271	
October 17	Richmond	Alfond Stadium; Orono, ME	L 10–35		
October 24	at James Madison	Bridgeforth Stadium; Harrisonburg, VA	L 28–34		
October 31	at No. 8 Delaware	Delaware Stadium; Newark, DE	W 39–27		
November 14	at No. 10 UMass	Warren McGuirk Alumni Stadium; Hadley, MA	L 34–55	10,355	
November 21	Northeastern*	Alfond Stadium; Orono, ME	W 20–14		
*Non-conference game; Rankings from The Sports Network Poll released prior to the game
