= 1998 Rhode Island Rams football team =

American college football season

1998 Rhode Island Rams football
- Conference: Atlantic 10 Conference
- New England Division
- Record: 3–8 (2–6 A-10)
- Head coach: Floyd Keith (6th season)
- Defensive coordinator: Pat Narduzzi (1st season)
- Home stadium: Meade Stadium

1998 Atlantic 10 Conference football standings
	Conf.			Overall
Team	W		L	W		L
New England Division
No. 1 UMass x^	6	–	2	12	–	3
No. 9 Connecticut x^	6	–	2	10	–	3
Maine	3	–	5	6	–	5
New Hampshire	3	–	5	4	–	7
Rhode Island	2	–	6	3	–	8
Mid-Atlantic Division
No. 10 Richmond x$^	7	–	1	9	–	3
No. 23 Delaware	4	–	4	7	–	4
Villanova	4	–	4	6	–	5
No. 17 William & Mary	4	–	4	7	–	4
Northeastern	3	–	5	5	–	6
James Madison	2	–	6	3	–	8
$ – Conference champion; x – Division champion/co-champions; ^ – NCAA Division I-AA playoff participant; Rankings from The Sports Network poll

The 1998 Rhode Island Rams football team was an American football team that represented the University of Rhode Island in the Atlantic 10 Conference during the 1998 NCAA Division I-AA football season. In their sixth season under head coach Floyd Keith, the Rams compiled a 3–8 record (2–6 against conference opponents) and finished last in the New England Division of the conference.

== Schedule ==
Date	Opponent	Site	Result	Attendance	Source
September 5	No. 14 William & Mary	Meade Stadium; Kingston, RI	L 13–21	3,713	
September 17	Richmond	Meade Stadium; Kingston, RI	L 17–20 ^{OT}	2,519	
September 26	at Northeastern	Parsons Field; Brookline, MA	L 17–24	4,866	
October 3	Brown^{†}*	Meade Stadium; Kingston, RI (rivalry)	W 44–16	7,214	
October 10	at Maine	Alfond Stadium; Orono, ME	W 18–17	3,271	
October 17	at No. 25 Hofstra*	James M. Shuart Stadium; Hempstead, NY	L 30–48	7,452	
October 24	at No. 10 Connecticut	Memorial Stadium; Storrs, CT (rivalry)	L 17–31	12,572	
October 31	James Madison	Meade Stadium; Kingston, RI	W 28–21	2,389	
November 7	No. 12 UMass	Meade Stadium; Kingston, RI	L 13–23	5,036	
November 14	at New Hampshire	Cowell Stadium; Durham, NH	L 7–9	3,335	
November 21	at Villanova	Villanova Stadium; Villanova, PA	L 15–27	5,214	
*Non-conference game; ^{†}Homecoming; Rankings from The Sports Network Poll released prior to the game
