= 1998 NCAA Division I-AA Football Championship Game =

Postseason college football game

1998 NCAA Division I-AA Football Championship
- I-AA National Championship Game
Georgia Southern Eagles	UMass Minutemen
(14–0)	(11–3)
SoCon	Atlantic 10
43	55
Head coach: Paul Johnson	Head coach: Mark Whipple
TSN / Seed; 1 / 1	TSN / Seed; 12 / 11
	1	2	3	4	Total
Georgia Southern	7	14	12	10	43
UMass	21	17	0	17	55
- Date: December 19, 1998
- Season: 1998
- Stadium: Finley Stadium
- Location: Chattanooga, Tennessee
- Referee: John W. Keys (Big Sky)
- Attendance: 17,501

United States TV coverage
- Network: ESPN

The 1998 NCAA Division I-AA Football Championship Game was a postseason college football game between the Georgia Southern Eagles and the UMass Minutemen. The game was played on December 19, 1998, at Finley Stadium, home field of the University of Tennessee at Chattanooga. The culminating game of the 1998 NCAA Division I-AA football season, it was won by UMass, 55–43.

== Teams ==
The participants of the Championship Game were the finalists of the 1998 I-AA Playoffs, which began with a 16-team bracket.

=== UMass Minutemen ===
UMass finished their regular season with an 8–3 record (6–2 in conference); two of their losses had been to rival Connecticut, with one considered a non-conference game. Seeded 11th in the playoffs, the Minutemen defeated sixth-seed McNeese State, 14-seed Lehigh, and second-seed Northwestern State to reach the final. This was the second appearance for UMass in a Division I-AA championship game, having lost to Florida A&M in the 1978 inaugural title game.

=== Georgia Southern Eagles ===
Georgia Southern finished their regular season with an 11–0 record (8–0 in conference). The Eagles, seeded first, defeated 16-seed Colgate, eighth-seed Connecticut, and fourth-seed Western Illinois to reach the final. This was the sixth appearance for Georgia Southern in a Division I-AA championship game, having four prior wins (1985, 1986, 1989, 1990) and one prior loss (1988).

== Game summary ==
=== Scoring summary ===
Scoring summary

Quarter	Time	Drive			Team	Scoring information	Score	
Quarter	Time	Plays	Yards	TOP	Team	Scoring information	GSU	UM
1	12:56	7	67	2:04	UM	Marcel Shipp 25-yard touchdown run, Jason Cherry kick good	0	7
1	8:29				UM	Fumble recovery returned 9 yards for touchdown by Kole Ayi, Cherry kick good	0	14
1	7:25	2	48	1:08	GSU	Greg Hill 40-yard touchdown run, Chris Chambers kick good	7	14
1	5:04	1	7	0:07	UM	Adrian Zullo 7-yard touchdown reception from Jamie Holston, Cherry kick good	7	21
2	14:46	11	63	3:34	UM	22-yard field goal by Cherry	7	24
2	10:54	6	36	2:11	GSU	Corey Joyner 6-yard touchdown reception from Greg Hill, Chambers kick good	14	24
2	7:17	11	64	3:37	UM	Todd Bankhead 1-yard touchdown run, Cherry kick good	14	31
2	4:09	5	26	1:35	UM	Shipp 4-yard touchdown run, Cherry kick good	14	38
2	2:01	6	55	2:08	GSU	Adrian Peterson 1-yard touchdown run, Chambers kick good	21	38
3	8:54	13	78	6:06	GSU	Peterson 5-yard touchdown run, Chambers kick no good	27	38
3	0:41	14	98	6:07	GSU	Hill 2-yard touchdown run, 2-point run failed	33	38
4	13:42	5	72	1:59	UM	Kevin Quinlan 2-yard touchdown run, Cherry kick good	33	45
4	11:51	5	42	1:35	UM	Shipp 2-yard touchdown run, Cherry kick good	33	52
4	8:39	12	58	3:12	GSU	38-yard field goal by Chambers	36	52
4	2:21	7	13	3:04	UM	25-yard field goal by Cherry	36	55
4	1:04	8	60	1:17	GSU	J. R. Revere 29-yard touchdown run, Chambers kick good	43	55
"TOP" = time of possession. For other American football terms, see Glossary of American football.							43	55

=== Game statistics ===
	1	2	3	4	Total
No. 1 Eagles	7	14	12	10	43
No. 11 Minutemen	21	17	0	17	55

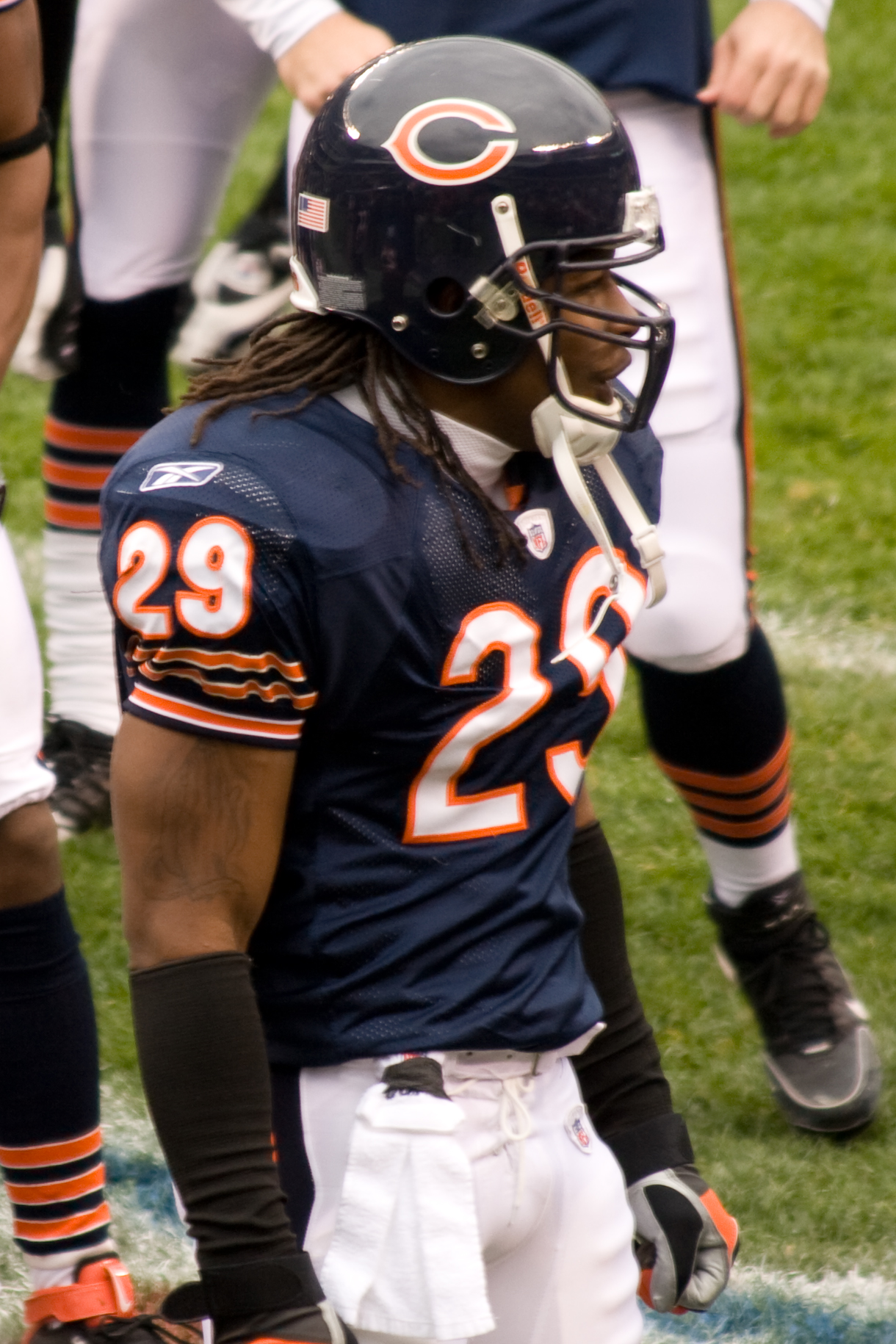
Georgia Southern running back Adrian Peterson

Statistics	GSU	UM
First downs	26	23
Plays–yards	86–595	77–462
Rushes–yards	65–457	51–303
Passing yards	138	159
Passing: comp–att–int	10–21–1	18–26–0
Time of possession	30:48	29:12

Team	Category	Player	Statistics
Georgia Southern	Passing	Greg Hill	8–16, 111 yds, 1 TD, 1 INT
Georgia Southern	Rushing	Greg Hill	29 car, 228 yds, 2 TD
Georgia Southern	Receiving	Corey Joyner	6 rec, 94 yds, 1 TD
UMass	Passing	Todd Bankhead	17–25, 152 yds
UMass	Rushing	Marcel Shipp	35 car, 244 yds, 3 TD
UMass	Receiving	Jimmy Moore	6 rec, 63 yds
