= 1998 Connecticut Huskies football team =

American college football season

1998 Connecticut Huskies football

A-10 New England Division co-champion

NCAA Division I-AA Second Round, L 30–52 at Georgia Southern
- Conference: Atlantic 10 Conference
- New England

Ranking
- Sports Network: No. 9
- Record: 10–3 (6–2 A-10)
- Head coach: Skip Holtz (5th season)
- Offensive coordinator: Todd Fitch (3rd season)
- Defensive coordinator: Nick Rapone (4th season)
- Home stadium: Memorial Stadium

1998 Atlantic 10 Conference football standings
	Conf.			Overall
Team	W		L	W		L
New England Division
No. 1 UMass x^	6	–	2	12	–	3
No. 9 Connecticut x^	6	–	2	10	–	3
Maine	3	–	5	6	–	5
New Hampshire	3	–	5	4	–	7
Rhode Island	2	–	6	3	–	8
Mid-Atlantic Division
No. 10 Richmond x$^	7	–	1	9	–	3
No. 23 Delaware	4	–	4	7	–	4
Villanova	4	–	4	6	–	5
No. 17 William & Mary	4	–	4	7	–	4
Northeastern	3	–	5	5	–	6
James Madison	2	–	6	3	–	8
$ – Conference champion; x – Division champion/co-champions; ^ – NCAA Division I-AA playoff participant; Rankings from The Sports Network poll

The 1998 Connecticut Huskies football team represented the University of Connecticut as a member of the New England Division of the Atlantic 10 Conference (A-10) during the 1998 NCAA Division I-AA football season. Led by fifth-year head coach Skip Holtz, the Huskies compiled an overall record of 10–3 with a mark of 6–2 in conference play, sharing the A-10 New England Division title with UMass. Connecticut advanced to the NCAA Division I-AA Football Championship playoffs, where the Huskies defeated Hampton in the first round before losing to the eventual national runner-up, Georgia Southern, in the quarterfinals. Connecticut played home games at Memorial Stadium in Storrs, Connecticut.

== Schedule ==
Date	Opponent	Rank	Site	Result	Attendance	Source
September 5	at Colgate*		Andy Kerr Stadium; Hamilton, NY	W 45–35	5,000	
September 19	Maine	No. 21	Memorial Stadium; Storrs, CT	W 35–27		
September 26	at Yale*	No. 18	Yale Bowl; New Haven, CT	W 63–21	17,827	
October 3	at New Hampshire	No. 18	Cowell Stadium; Durham, NH	L 20–34		
October 10	No. 14 Hofstra*	No. 25	Memorial Stadium; Storrs, CT	W 40–18		
October 17	No. 18 UMass	No. 15	Memorial Stadium; Storrs, CT (rivalry)	W 44–41	8,581	
October 24	Rhode Island	No. 10	Memorial Stadium; Storrs, CT (rivalry)	W 31–17	12,572	
October 31	Northeastern	No. 9	Parsons Field; Brookline, MA	W 32–22		
November 7	No. 15 Delaware	No. 5	Memorial Stadium; Storrs, CT	L 17–59		
November 14	at No. 6 William & Mary	No. 13	Zable Stadium; Williamsburg, VA	W 34–26	6,529	
November 21	at No. 7 UMass	No. 9	Alumni Stadium; Amherst, MA	W 28–27	16,392	
November 28	No. 9 Hampton*	No. 8	Memorial Stadium; Storrs, CT (NCAA Division I-AA First Round)	W 42–34		
December 5	at No. 1 Georgia Southern*	No. 8	Paulson Stadium; Statesboro, GA (NCAA Division I-AA Second Round)	L 30–52	9,762	
*Non-conference game; Rankings from The Sports Network Poll released prior to the game
