= 1998 Villanova Wildcats football team =

American college football season

1998 Villanova Wildcats football
- Conference: Atlantic 10 Conference
- Record: 6–5 (4–4 A-10)
- Head coach: Andy Talley (14th season)
- Offensive coordinator: Dave Clawson (3rd season)
- Offensive scheme: Multiple
- Defensive coordinator: Joe Trainer (2nd season)
- Base defense: 4–3
- Home stadium: Villanova Stadium

1998 Atlantic 10 Conference football standings
	Conf.			Overall
Team	W		L	W		L
New England Division
No. 1 UMass x^	6	–	2	12	–	3
No. 9 Connecticut x^	6	–	2	10	–	3
Maine	3	–	5	6	–	5
New Hampshire	3	–	5	4	–	7
Rhode Island	2	–	6	3	–	8
Mid-Atlantic Division
No. 10 Richmond x$^	7	–	1	9	–	3
No. 23 Delaware	4	–	4	7	–	4
Villanova	4	–	4	6	–	5
No. 17 William & Mary	4	–	4	7	–	4
Northeastern	3	–	5	5	–	6
James Madison	2	–	6	3	–	8
$ – Conference champion; x – Division champion/co-champions; ^ – NCAA Division I-AA playoff participant; Rankings from The Sports Network poll

The 1998 Villanova Wildcats football team was an American football team that represented the Villanova University as a member of the Atlantic 10 Conference during the 1998 NCAA Division I-AA football season. In their 14th year under head coach Andy Talley, the team compiled a 6–5 record.

== Schedule ==
Date	Opponent	Rank	Site	Result	Attendance	Source
September 5	at Pittsburgh*		Pitt Stadium; Pittsburgh, PA	L 41–48	36,543	
September 12	No. 4 Delaware	No. 8	Villanova Stadium; Villanova, PA (rivalry)	W 34–31 ^{OT}	10,160	
September 19	at James Madison	No. 4	Bridgeforth Stadium; Harrisonburg, VA	W 34–30	8,000	
September 26	No. 7 William & Mary	No. 4	Villanova Stadium; Villanova, PA	W 45–28	12,008	
October 3	at Maine	No. 4	Alfond Stadium; Orono, ME	L 10–44	4,791	
October 10	at Northeastern	No. 11	Parsons Field; Brookline, MA	L 17–28	2,270	
October 24	at No. 19 UMass	No. 22	McGuirk Stadium; Hadley, MA	L 26–36	12,135	
October 31	at Fordham*		Coffey Field; Bronx, NY	W 45–12	2,312	
November 7	No. 16 Richmond		Villanova Stadium; Villanova, PA	L 14–28	7,380	
November 14	Buffalo*		Villanova Stadium; Villanova, PA	W 65–40	6,121	
November 21	Rhode Island		Villanova Stadium; Villanova, PA	W 27–15	5,214	
*Non-conference game; Rankings from The Sports Network Poll released prior to the game
