= J. J. Arrington =

American football player (born 1983)

No. 28, 26
- Position: Running back

Personal information
- Born: January 23, 1983 (age 43); Nashville, North Carolina, U.S.
- Listed height: 5 ft 9 in (1.75 m)
- Listed weight: 212 lb (96 kg)

Career information
- High school: Northern Nash (Rocky Mount, North Carolina)
- College: Canyons (2001–2002); California (2003–2004)
- NFL draft: 2005: 2nd round, 44th overall pick

Career history
- Arizona Cardinals (2005–2008); Denver Broncos (2009); Philadelphia Eagles (2010)*; Las Vegas Locomotives (2011)*
- * Offseason or practice squad member only

Awards and highlights
- Consensus All-American (2004); Pop Warner Trophy (2004); First-team All-Pac-10 (2004)

Career NFL statistics
- Rushing attempts: 183
- Rushing yards: 654
- Receptions: 91
- Receiving yards: 693
- Return yards: 2,694
- Total touchdowns: 7
- Stats at Pro Football Reference

Johnathan Jerone Arrington (born January 23, 1983) is an American former professional football player who was a running back in the National Football League (NFL). He played college football for the California Golden Bears, earning consensus All-American recognition in 2004. Arrington was selected by the Arizona Cardinals in the second round of the 2005 NFL draft. He also played for the Denver Broncos and had a brief stint with the Philadelphia Eagles and Las Vegas Locomotives of the United Football League (UFL). He also was the last player to win the Pop Warner Trophy.

== Early life ==
Arrington was born in Nashville, North Carolina. He attended Northern Nash High School and was a letterman in football as a tailback. In football, he was a three-year varsity starter and a two-time All-Conference selection. He was also named his team's Most Valuable Player and the Area Offensive Player of the Year as a senior.

== College career ==
Arrington was sent to College of the Canyons by East Carolina University with the intent that he would play for the Pirates in two years. As a sophomore at College of the Canyons, he won All-Region III honors (which is selected by the California Community College Football Coaches Association and the Junior College Athletic Bureau) and had 135 rushing attempts for 769 yards (5.7 yards per rushing attempt average), and caught 30 passes for 320 yards (10.67 yards per reception average). His 19 touchdowns that season, and 29 career touchdowns, were both school records.

Arrington transferred to the University of California, Berkeley, as a junior, and played for the California Golden Bears in 2003 and 2004. He received few carries for most of the 2003 season aside from his 114-yard performance against Southern Mississippi. A knee injury to then-starting running back Adimchinobi Echemandu thrust Arrington into the starting role against the Washington Huskies. This proved to be his breakout game as he mauled the Huskies defense for 185 yards and a touchdown on just 14 carries. In the first half he tallied 157 yards on ten carries. He also caught a 30-yard touchdown pass from Aaron Rodgers giving him a total of 215 yards on the day.

Despite his performance, he received limited carries for the rest of the 2003 season. He did play a pivotal role in the Insight Bowl by catching five passes for 38 yards, including a 13-yard touchdown pass that would reduce Virginia Tech's lead to 28–21 at halftime. Cal ultimately prevailed 52–49 on a game-winning field goal.

In 2004, Arrington earned the starting tailback spot after the departure of Echemandu for the NFL. Arrington played a major role in the Cal Bears' first 10-win season since 1949. He rushed for at least 100 yards in every single game that season. Arrington rushed for 169 yards or more in eight of his team's 12 games as well.

Ultimately Arrington had one of the greatest seasons of any running back in NCAA and Pac-10 history, gaining 2,018 rushing yards that season. He became only the third Pac-10 tailback to gain over 2,000 yards, joining USC tailbacks Marcus Allen and Charles White. His mark is also the tenth best total in NCAA history. He received the honor of the Pop Warner Award, deeming him the best College Football player on the west coast. He would also earn All-American and All-Pacific-10 conference honors.

Ultimately, the season would end in disappointment. Despite a 10–1 record, the Bears were bypassed for a BCS Bowl bid by the University of Texas. As a result, they played in the Pacific Life Holiday Bowl against a 7–4 Texas Tech squad, where Cal was defeated by a score of 45–31, to end Arrington's college career.

In addition, Arrington was not invited to the Heisman Trophy ceremony (a distinction afforded the top three to five likely winners) despite having a better statistical year (15 TDs, 2,018 yards rushing, 6.98 yards per carry) than the number 2 vote-getter, Adrian Peterson (15 TDs, 1,925 yards rushing, 5.68 yards per carry).

== Professional career ==
Pre-draft measurables
Height	Weight	Arm length	Hand span	40-yard dash	10-yard split	20-yard split	20-yard shuttle	Three-cone drill	Vertical jump	Broad jump	Bench press
5 ft 8 7/8 in (1.75 m)	214 lb (97 kg)	30 1/2 in (0.77 m)	8 3/4 in (0.22 m)	4.46 s	1.54 s	2.57 s	4.10 s	6.81 s	35.0 in (0.89 m)	10 ft 1 in (3.07 m)	18 reps
All values from NFL Combine

=== Arizona Cardinals ===
After drafting him in the second round of the 2005 NFL draft, the Cardinals placed him as the starting running back on the depth chart, with the intention of having him share carries with Marcel Shipp. He started the first game against the New York Giants gaining 5 yards on 8 carries (0.625 average). After this poor showing in his first game, he didn't play a snap the second game of the season against the St. Louis Rams. By the end of the season, he had played 15 games with 5 starts, gaining 370 yards on 112 carries (3.3 average) and 2 touchdowns. That following offseason the Cardinals signed Edgerrin James.

The Cardinals' drafting of Tim Hightower in 2008 resulted in Arrington being shifted to third place on the depth chart at running back. He became the team's principal kick returner and in Super Bowl XLIII caught 2 passes for 35 yards.

=== Denver Broncos ===
Arrington signed with the Denver Broncos on March 4, 2009. He was released by Denver on May 27, after failing his physical. It was determined that Arrington would need season-ending microfracture surgery on his right knee, following surgery to the same knee in February. He was re-signed on March 4, 2010.

=== Philadelphia Eagles ===
Arrington was traded to the Philadelphia Eagles in exchange for linebacker Joe Mays on July 30, 2010. He was waived on September 3. Due to Arrington being released prior to the start of the season, the Eagles received a 2012 sixth-round draft pick from the Broncos.

=== Las Vegas Locomotives ===
Before the 2011 season, Arrington signed with the Las Vegas Locomotives of the United Football League.

== See also ==
- List of college football yearly rushing leaders
