= 1998 Richmond Spiders football team =

American college football season

1998 Richmond Spiders football

A-10 champion A-10 Mid-Atlantic Division champion

NCAA Division I-AA First Round, L 23–24 vs. Lehigh
- Conference: Atlantic 10 Conference

Ranking
- Sports Network: No. 10
- Record: 9–3 (7–1 A-10)
- Head coach: Jim Reid (4th season)
- Captains: Eric King; Marc Megna; Winston October
- Home stadium: University of Richmond Stadium

1998 Atlantic 10 Conference football standings
	Conf.			Overall
Team	W		L	W		L
New England Division
No. 1 UMass x^	6	–	2	12	–	3
No. 9 Connecticut x^	6	–	2	10	–	3
Maine	3	–	5	6	–	5
New Hampshire	3	–	5	4	–	7
Rhode Island	2	–	6	3	–	8
Mid-Atlantic Division
No. 10 Richmond x$^	7	–	1	9	–	3
No. 23 Delaware	4	–	4	7	–	4
Villanova	4	–	4	6	–	5
No. 17 William & Mary	4	–	4	7	–	4
Northeastern	3	–	5	5	–	6
James Madison	2	–	6	3	–	8
$ – Conference champion; x – Division champion/co-champions; ^ – NCAA Division I-AA playoff participant; Rankings from The Sports Network poll

The 1998 Richmond Spiders football team represented the University of Richmond during the 1998 NCAA Division I-AA football season. It was the program's 115th season and they finished as Atlantic 10 Conference (A-10) champions after posting a 7–1 record in conference play. The Spiders earned a berth as the No. 3 seed into the 16-team NCAA Division I-AA playoffs, but were upset in the first round to 14-seed Lehigh. Richmond was led by fourth-year head coach Jim Reid.

== Schedule ==
Date	Time	Opponent	Rank	Site	Result	Attendance	Source
September 5		at Rutgers*		Rutgers Stadium; Piscataway, NJ	L 6–7		
September 12	1:00 p.m.	UMass		University of Richmond Stadium; Richmond, VA	L 17–22	10,219	
September 19		at Rhode Island		Meade Stadium; Kingston, RI	W 20–17 ^{OT}	2,519	
September 26		at Penn*		Franklin Field; Philadelphia, PA	W 34–18	5,309	
October 3		James Madison		University of Richmond Stadium; Richmond, VA (rivalry)	W 28–7	14,874	
October 10		at New Hampshire		Wildcat Stadium; Durham, NH	W 22–13		
October 17		at Maine		Alfond Stadium; Orono, ME	W 35–10		
October 24		at Northeastern	No. 23	Parsons Field; Brookline, MA	W 21–20		
November 7		at Villanova	No. 16	Villanova Stadium; Villanova, PA	W 28–14	7,380	
November 14		No. 11 Delaware	No. 12	University of Richmond Stadium; Richmond, VA	W 45–6		
November 21		No. 12 William & Mary	No. 8	University of Richmond Stadium; Richmond, VA (I-64 Bowl)	W 42–17	18,914	
November 28		No. 13 Lehigh*	No. 5	University of Richmond Stadium; Richmond, VA (Division I-AA First Round)	L 23–24	10,254	
*Non-conference game; Rankings from The Sports Network Poll released prior to the game; All times are in Eastern time

== Roster ==
1998 Richmond Spiders football team roster
Players
Coaches
Offense

Pos.	#	Name	Class
FB	44	Matt Snider	Sr
WR	80	Muneer Moore	Jr
WR	83	Dwaune Jones	Jr

Defense

Pos.	#	Name	Class
LB	6	Paris Lenon	Jr
DL	54	Marc Megna	Sr

Special teams

Pos.	#	Name	Class

Head coach

- Terry Shea

Coordinators/assistant coaches

Legend

- (C) Team captain
- (S) Suspended
- (I) Ineligible
- Injured
- Redshirt

Roster

== Awards and honors ==
- First Team All-America – Marc Megna (Walter Camp, The Sports Network, Associated Press)
- Second Team All-America – Winston October (The Sports Network)
- First Team All-Atlantic 10 – Eric King, Marc Megna, Paris Lenon, Winston October
- Second Team All-Atlantic 10 – Chris Anderson, Joe Douglas
- Third Team All-Atlantic 10 – Eric Beatty, Mac Jahney, Jasper Pendergrass
- Atlantic 10 Defensive Player of the Year – Marc Megna
- Atlantic 10 Coach of the Year – Jim Reid
