= 1998 James Madison Dukes football team =

American college football season

1998 James Madison Dukes football
- Conference: Atlantic 10 Conference
- Mid-Atlantic Division
- Record: 3–8 (2–6 A-10)
- Head coach: Alex Wood (4th season)
- Home stadium: Bridgeforth Stadium

1998 Atlantic 10 Conference football standings
	Conf.			Overall
Team	W		L	W		L
New England Division
No. 1 UMass x^	6	–	2	12	–	3
No. 9 Connecticut x^	6	–	2	10	–	3
Maine	3	–	5	6	–	5
New Hampshire	3	–	5	4	–	7
Rhode Island	2	–	6	3	–	8
Mid-Atlantic Division
No. 10 Richmond x$^	7	–	1	9	–	3
No. 23 Delaware	4	–	4	7	–	4
Villanova	4	–	4	6	–	5
No. 17 William & Mary	4	–	4	7	–	4
Northeastern	3	–	5	5	–	6
James Madison	2	–	6	3	–	8
$ – Conference champion; x – Division champion/co-champions; ^ – NCAA Division I-AA playoff participant; Rankings from The Sports Network poll

The 1998 James Madison Dukes football team was an American football team that represented James Madison University during the 1998 NCAA Division I-AA football season as a member of the Atlantic 10 Conference. In their fourth year under head coach Alex Wood, the team compiled a 3–8 record.

== Schedule ==
Date	Opponent	Site	Result	Attendance	Source
September 5	at Maryland*	Byrd Stadium; College Park, MD	L 15–23	36,547	
September 12	Hofstra*	Bridgeforth Stadium; Harrisonburg, VA	L 24–37	11,200	
September 19	Villanova	Bridgeforth Stadium; Harrisonburg, VA	L 30–34	8,000	
September 26	Elon*	Bridgeforth Stadium; Harrisonburg, VA	W 19–12	8,000	
October 3	at Richmond	UR Stadium; Richmond, VA (rivalry)	L 7–28	14,874	
October 10	at No. 24 UMass	McGuirk Stadium; Hadley, MA	L 26–28	14,202	
October 17	No. 7 William & Mary	Bridgeforth Stadium; Harrisonburg, VA (rivalry)	L 12–24	14,000	
October 24	Maine	Bridgeforth Stadium; Harrisonburg, VA	W 34–28		
October 31	at Rhode Island	Meade Stadium; Kingston, RI	L 21–28	2,389	
November 7	Northeastern	Bridgeforth Stadium; Harrisonburg, VA	W 31–17	6,300	
November 21	at No. 23 Delaware	Delaware Stadium; Newark, DE (rivalry)	L 14–28	16,371	
*Non-conference game; Rankings from The Sports Network Poll released prior to the game
