= 1998 New Hampshire Wildcats football team =

American college football season

1998 New Hampshire Wildcats football
- Conference: Atlantic 10 Conference
- New England Division
- Record: 4–7 (3–5 A-10)
- Head coach: Bill Bowes (27th season)
- Offensive coordinator: Sean McDonnell (5th season)
- Home stadium: Cowell Stadium

1998 Atlantic 10 Conference football standings
	Conf.			Overall
Team	W		L	W		L
New England Division
No. 1 UMass x^	6	–	2	12	–	3
No. 9 Connecticut x^	6	–	2	10	–	3
Maine	3	–	5	6	–	5
New Hampshire	3	–	5	4	–	7
Rhode Island	2	–	6	3	–	8
Mid-Atlantic Division
No. 10 Richmond x$^	7	–	1	9	–	3
No. 23 Delaware	4	–	4	7	–	4
Villanova	4	–	4	6	–	5
No. 17 William & Mary	4	–	4	7	–	4
Northeastern	3	–	5	5	–	6
James Madison	2	–	6	3	–	8
$ – Conference champion; x – Division champion/co-champions; ^ – NCAA Division I-AA playoff participant; Rankings from The Sports Network poll

The 1998 New Hampshire Wildcats football team was an American football team that represented the University of New Hampshire as a member of New England Division of the Atlantic 10 Conference during the 1998 NCAA Division I-AA football season. In its 27th and final year under head coach Bill Bowes, the team compiled a 4–7 record (3–5 against conference opponents) and finished in a tie for third place in the New England Division.

== Schedule ==
Date	Opponent	Site	Result	Attendance	Source
September 5	at Northeastern	Parsons Field; Brookline, MA	L 3–10	4,160	
September 12	at Maine	Alfond Stadium; Orono, ME (Battle for the Brice–Cowell Musket)	L 28–52		
September 19	East Stroudsburg*	Cowell Stadium; Durham, NH	W 70–10		
September 26	at No. 9 Delaware	Delaware Stadium; Newark, DE	L 7–31		
October 3	No. 18 Connecticut	Cowell Stadium; Durham, NH	W 34–20		
October 10	Richmond*	Cowell Stadium; Durham, NH	L 13–22		
October 17	Northeastern	Cowell Stadium; Durham, NH	L 28–35		
October 24	at No. 6 William & Mary	Zable Stadium; Williamsburg, VA	W 31–19	10,553	
October 31	No. 16 UMass	Cowell Stadium; Durham, NH (rivalry)	L 26–27	3,578	
November 7	at No. 25 Hofstra*	James M. Shuart Stadium; Hempstead, NY	L 38–41		
November 14	Rhode Island	Cowell Stadium; Durham, NH	W 9–7	3,335	
*Non-conference game; Rankings from The Sports Network Poll released prior to the game
