= 1998 William & Mary Tribe football team =

American college football season

1998 William & Mary Tribe football
- Conference: Atlantic 10 Conference
- Mid-Atlantic Division

Ranking
- Sports Network: No. 17
- Record: 7–4 (4–4 A-10)
- Head coach: Jimmye Laycock (19th season)
- Offensive coordinator: Zbig Kepa (6th season)
- Captains: Sean Reid; Mike Cook; Greg Whirley; Tim Engel
- Home stadium: Zable Stadium

1998 Atlantic 10 Conference football standings
	Conf.			Overall
Team	W		L	W		L
New England Division
No. 1 UMass x^	6	–	2	12	–	3
No. 9 Connecticut x^	6	–	2	10	–	3
Maine	3	–	5	6	–	5
New Hampshire	3	–	5	4	–	7
Rhode Island	2	–	6	3	–	8
Mid-Atlantic Division
No. 10 Richmond x$^	7	–	1	9	–	3
No. 23 Delaware	4	–	4	7	–	4
Villanova	4	–	4	6	–	5
No. 17 William & Mary	4	–	4	7	–	4
Northeastern	3	–	5	5	–	6
James Madison	2	–	6	3	–	8
$ – Conference champion; x – Division champion/co-champions; ^ – NCAA Division I-AA playoff participant; Rankings from The Sports Network poll

The 1998 William & Mary Tribe football team represented the College of William & Mary as member of the Mid-Atlantic Division of the Atlantic 10 Conference (A-10) during the 1998 NCAA Division I-AA football season. Led by Jimmye Laycock in his 19th year as head coach, William & Mary finished the season with an overall record of 7–4 and a mark of 4–4 in A-10 play, tying for second place the Mid-Atlantic Division. They were ranked No. 17 in the final Sports Network poll, but did not receive a bid to the NCAA Division I-AA playoffs.

== Schedule ==
Date	Opponent	Rank	Site	Result	Attendance	Source
September 5	at Rhode Island	No. 14	Meade Stadium; Kingston, RI	W 21–13	3,713	
September 12	VMI*	No. 13	Zable Stadium; Williamsburg, VA (rivalry)	W 49–0	9,598	
September 19	Northeastern	No. 8	Zable Stadium; Williamsburg, VA	W 24–21	6,005	
September 26	at No. 4 Villanova	No. 7	Villanova Stadium; Villanova, PA	L 28–45	12,008	
October 3	at Temple*	No. 13	Veterans Stadium; Philadelphia, PA	W 45–38	16,281	
October 10	No. 6 Delaware	No. 12	Zable Stadium; Williamsburg, VA (rivalry)	W 52–45	7,443	
October 17	at James Madison	No. 7	Bridgeforth Stadium; Harrisonburg, VA (rivalry)	W 24–12	14,000	
October 24	New Hampshire	No. 6	Zable Stadium; Williamsburg, VA	L 19–31	10,553	
October 31	at No. 2 Hampton*	No. 12	Armstrong Stadium; Hampton, VA	W 41–34	10,704	
November 14	No. 13 Connecticut	No. 6	Zable Stadium; Williamsburg, VA	L 26–34	6,529	
November 21	at No. 8 Richmond	No. 12	University of Richmond Stadium; Richmond, VA (I-64 Bowl)	L 17–42	18,914	
*Non-conference game; Rankings from The Sports Network Poll released prior to the game
