= Kole Ayi =

American football player (born 1978)

No. 99, 54
- Position: Linebacker

Personal information
- Born: September 27, 1978 (age 48); Ann Arbor, Michigan, U.S.
- Listed height: 6 ft 1 in (1.85 m)
- Listed weight: 231 lb (105 kg)

Career information
- High school: Nashua South (Nashua, New Hampshire)
- College: UMass (1997–2000)
- NFL draft: 2001: undrafted

Career history
- St. Louis Rams (2001); New York Giants (2001); New England Patriots (2001); St. Louis Rams (2002); Carolina Panthers (2003)*
- * Offseason or practice squad member only

Awards and highlights
- Super Bowl champion (XXXVI); NCAA Division I-AA national champion (1998); 2× First-team All-American (1999, 2000); 2× First-team All-Atlantic 10 (1999, 2000); Second-team All-Atlantic 10 (1998)
- Stats at Pro Football Reference

Bamikole Richard Ayi (born September 27, 1978) is an American former professional football player who was a linebacker for two seasons in the National Football League (NFL) with the New England Patriots and St. Louis Rams. Ayi played college football at the University of Massachusetts Amherst. He was a member of the Patriots team that won Super Bowl XXXVI.

== Early life ==
Bamikole Richard Ayi was born on September 27, 1978, in Ann Arbor, Michigan. He played high school football at Nashua High School South in Nashua, New Hampshire and was a three-year letterman. He spent time at outside linebacker, tight end, and safety in high school. Ayi was named second-team all-state as a junior. He helped the team to a 10–2 record his senior year in 1996, recording 19 receptions for 560 yards on offense and six interceptions on defense, while earning first-team All-State and Boston Globe New Hampshire Player of the Year honors. He was also a two-year letterman in track as a sprinter and thrower. He won the state title in the shot put with a throw of 56'7". Ayi also tied the state record in the 55-meter dash with a time of 6.2 seconds.

== College career ==
Ayi was a four-year letterman for the UMass Minutemen of the University of Massachusetts Amherst from 1997 to 2000. He played in all 11 games during his freshman year in 1997, seeing action at both linebacker and on special teams, and totaled 29 solo tackles, 14 assisted tackles, and one sack.

Ayi started all 15 games in 1998 at outside linebacker, posting 116 solo tackles, 49 assisted tackles, two sacks, five forced fumbles, five fumble recoveries, one interception, and eight pass breakups. His 165 total tackles were second in the Atlantic 10 Conference while his 116 solo tackles set a school record. In the 1998 NCAA Division I-AA Football Championship Game, Ayi had a team-leading 16 tackles while also forcing two fumbles and recovering three fumbles, one of which he returned for a touchdown, in the 55–43 victory over Georgia Southern. He was named second-team All-Atlantic 10 for his performance during the 1998 season.

Ayi started every game at middle linebacker in 1999, recording 109 solo tackles, 38 assisted tackles, five sacks, and two interceptions. His 147 total tackles were the most on the team. Ayi finished second in voting for the Buck Buchanan Award, given to NCAA Division I-AA's best defensive player. For the 1998 season, he garnered The Sports Network first-team All-American, Associated Press third-team All-American, Don Hansen's Football Gazette National Linebacker of the Year, and first-team All-Atlantic 10 recognition.

As a senior in 2000, Ayi totaled 76 solo tackles, 47 assisted tackles, six sacks, and one interception. He led the team in total tackles for the third straight season with 123. He also earned first-team All-Atlantic 10 and The Sports Network first-team All-American honors for the second consecutive year. He finished fifth in the voting for the Buck Buchanan Award.

Ayi finished his college career with a school-record 330 solo tackles. His 478 total tackles were the third most in school history. He was inducted into the UMass Athletics Hall of Fame in 2014.

== Professional career ==
Ayi signed with the St. Louis Rams on May 3, 2001, after going undrafted in the 2001 NFL draft. He played in six games for the Rams during the 2001 season, posting seven solo tackles and two assisted tackles, before being released on October 23. He was signed to the Rams' practice squad the next day.

On October 25, 2001, Ayi was signed to the New York Giants' active roster off of the Rams' practice squad. He was waived on November 13, 2001, before playing in any games for the Giants.

Ayi was claimed off waivers by the New England Patriots on November 15, 2001. He appeared in one game for the Patriots, recording two assisted tackles, before being placed on injured reserve on November 28, 2001. On February 3, 2002, the Patriots beat Ayi's former team, the St. Louis Rams, in Super Bowl XXXVI by a score of 20–17. Ayi became a free agent after the 2001 season and re-signed with New England on June 21, 2002.

On June 26, 2002, Ayi was traded back to the Rams for a conditional draft pick. He played in six games for the Rams in 2002, posting four solo tackles and one assisted tackle, before being placed on injured reserve for the second year in a row on October 16, 2002. He became a free agent after the 2002 season.

Ayi signed with the Carolina Panthers on August 18, 2003. He was released on August 31, signed to the team's practice squad on October 28, and released again on December 5, 2003.
