= John W. Keys =

American government official (1942–2008)

- Born: March 25, 1942; Sheffield, Alabama, US
- Died: May 30, 2008 (aged 66); Monticello, Utah, US
- Education: Georgia Tech, BYU
- Occupation: Commissioner of the United States Bureau of Reclamation (2001–2006)
- Known for: College football official

John Walton Keys III (March 25, 1942 – May 30, 2008) was the Commissioner of the United States Bureau of Reclamation from 2001 to 2006. He was also a college football official for 20 years in the Big Sky Conference.

== Early life and education ==
Keys graduated from high school in Sheffield, Alabama. He then received a bachelor's degree in civil engineering from the Georgia Institute of Technology in 1964 and a master's degree in civil engineering from Brigham Young University in 1971. Keys also did further studies at Colorado State University.

== Career ==
Keys first began working with the Bureau of Reclamation as a civil and hydraulic engineer in 1964. In 1986, he was appointed the Northwest Regional Director, overseeing operations in Washington state, Oregon, Idaho, and parts of Montana and Wyoming. He retired from that position in 1998. For the next three years, Keys spent most of his time flying his personal aircraft for humanitarian purposes. He returned to the bureau when he was confirmed as commissioner in July 2001. Keys left the position of commissioner in 2006, but was at times consulted by his successor, Bob Johnson.

Keys was an American football official for 40 years, including 20 years officiating college football games in the Big Sky Conference. He was the referee of the 1998 NCAA Division I-AA Football Championship Game between UMass and Georgia Southern.

Keys died on May 30, 2008, when the Cessna 172 he was piloting crashed in the Canyonlands National Park. He was a resident of Moab, Utah, at the time of his death.

== Legacy ==
In May 2009, the John W. Keys III Pump-Generating Power Plant at the Grand Coulee Dam was named in honor of Keys' service.
