= LeRon McCoy =

American football player (born 1982)

No. 19, 17
- Position: Wide receiver

Personal information
- Born: January 24, 1982 (age 44); Harrisburg, Pennsylvania, U.S.
- Listed height: 6 ft 1 in (1.85 m)
- Listed weight: 219 lb (99 kg)

Career information
- High school: Bishop McDevitt (Harrisburg)
- College: IUP (2001–2004)
- NFL draft: 2005: 7th round, 226th overall pick

Career history
- Arizona Cardinals (2005–2006); San Francisco 49ers (2007); Houston Texans (2008)*; California Redwoods (2009)*
- * Offseason or practice squad member only

Career NFL statistics
- Receptions: 18
- Receiving yards: 191
- Receiving touchdowns: 1
- Stats at Pro Football Reference

LeRon Terrell McCoy (born January 24, 1982) is an American former professional football player who was a wide receiver in the National Football League (NFL). He played college football for the IUP Crimson Hawks and was selected by the Arizona Cardinals in the seventh round of the 2005 NFL draft. He was also a member of the San Francisco 49ers, Houston Texans of the NFL, and the California Redwoods of the United Football League (UFL). He is the older brother of former NFL running back LeSean McCoy.

== Early life ==
McCoy attended Harrisburg High School in his freshman year. He then attended Bishop McDevitt High School from his sophomore year to his senior year. He lettered three times in football.

== College career ==
McCoy attended Indiana University of Pennsylvania. McCoy saw limited time as a reserve in his true freshman season in 2001 before breaking out with 30 catches for 640 yards and eight touchdowns as a 13-game starter in 2002. He had 36 receptions for 521 yards and six touchdowns as a junior in 2003 and 36 receptions for 701 yards and 10 touchdowns as a senior in 2004.

He finished his college career with 110 receptions for 2,096 yards (19.1 yards per rec. avg.), and 25 touchdowns. His 110 receptions rank eighth on the school's career record list.

== Professional career ==
Pre-draft measurables
Height	Weight	Arm length	Hand span	40-yard dash	10-yard split	20-yard split	20-yard shuttle	Three-cone drill	Vertical jump	Broad jump
6 ft 1 1/2 in (1.87 m)	211 lb (96 kg)	33 1/2 in (0.85 m)	9 3/8 in (0.24 m)	4.41 s	1.56 s	2.61 s	4.21 s	7.19 s	37.0 in (0.94 m)	10 ft 0 in (3.05 m)
All values from NFL Combine

At the NFL Combine in February 2005, McCoy ran the 40-yard dash in 4.4 seconds, the fourth-fastest time among wide receivers.

=== Arizona Cardinals ===
McCoy was selected in the seventh round (226th overall) of the 2005 NFL draft to the Arizona Cardinals of the National Football League (NFL). In his rookie season he played in ten games and started four of them. He caught eighteen passes for 191 yards and one touchdown. He caught his lone touchdown in week thirteen against the Washington Redskins. Prior to the 2006 season he was placed on injured reserve.

On August 31, 2007, McCoy was released by the Cardinals.

=== San Francisco 49ers ===
On October 10, 2007, McCoy signed with the San Francisco 49ers.

On December 28, 2007, McCoy was released by the 49ers.

=== Houston Texans ===
Prior to the 2008 season, McCoy signed with the Houston Texans.

On August 30, 2008, McCoy was released by the Texans.

=== California Redwoods ===
In 2009, McCoy signed with—but did not play for—the California Redwoods of the United Football League (UFL) during the league's inaugural season.

== Personal life ==
McCoy is the older brother of former NFL running back LeSean McCoy.
