= Marcel Shipp =

American football player and coach (born 1978)

No. 31, 26
- Position: Running back

Personal information
- Born: August 8, 1978 (age 48); Paterson, New Jersey, U.S.
- Listed height: 5 ft 11 in (1.80 m)
- Listed weight: 224 lb (102 kg)

Career information
- High school: Passaic County Technical Institute (Wayne, New Jersey)
- College: UMass
- NFL draft: 2001: undrafted

Career history

Playing
- Arizona Cardinals (2001–2007); Houston Texans (2008)*; Las Vegas Locomotives (2009–2011)
- * Offseason or practice squad member only

Coaching
- Massachusetts (2014) (RB); New York Jets (2015–2016) (RB); Mountain Pointe HS (AZ) (2021-present) (RB)

Awards and highlights
- 2× UFL champion (2009, 2010); Second-team All-American (1998); 2× Third-team All-American (1999–2000); 3× First-team All-A-10 (1998–2000)

Career NFL statistics
- Rushing attempts: 605
- Rushing yards: 2,197
- Rushing touchdowns: 11
- Receptions: 113
- Receiving yards: 937
- Receiving touchdowns: 3
- Stats at Pro Football Reference

Marcel Cornelius Shipp (born August 8, 1978) is an American former professional football player who was a running back in the National Football League (NFL) from 2001 to 2008 for the Arizona Cardinals and Houston Texans. He was signed by the Arizona Cardinals as an undrafted free agent in 2001, and played with them through the 2007 season. He was signed for a short time by the Texans in 2008. He played college football for the UMass Minutemen. Shipp was last the running backs coach for the New York Jets.

== Early life ==
Shipp played high school football at the Passaic County Technical Institute in Wayne, New Jersey. Shipp rushed for 1,510 yards and 24 touchdowns as a senior to earn First-team All-State honors.

== College career ==
Shipp attended the University of Massachusetts Amherst and was a letterman for the UMass Minutemen football team. As a sophomore, he was a first-team All-American selection, having run for a school-record 2,542 yards and 18 touchdowns. He capped the season by rushing for 244 yards and three scores in the team's improbable 55–43 victory over the top-ranked Georgia Southern Eagles in the 1998 NCAA Division I-AA Football Championship Game. As a junior, he was a finalist for the Walter Payton Award, and added another school record—24 rushing touchdowns—to his resume to go with 1,846 rushing yards. Shipp finished his college career with 5,383 rushing yards, which currently ranks sixth on the Division I-AA football career record list.

== Professional career ==
=== Arizona Cardinals ===
He signed as an undrafted free agent with the Arizona Cardinals on April 23, 2001. He made the team but played little in 2001, not getting a single rushing attempt. He did return 6 kickoffs. In 2002 Shipp would see many more opportunities. He had his breakout game in a Week 4 win against the New York Giants when he rushed for 92 yards on 17 carries and scored two touchdowns. In Week 11, he rushed for a season high 135 yards and a touchdown against the Oakland Raiders. He finished the year with a team leading 834 rushing yards on 188 carries (4.4 yards per carry) and 9 total touchdowns.

At the beginning of the 2003 season Shipp's status was somewhat unclear as the team had signed Emmitt Smith in the offseason. Despite Smith's presence Shipp again led the team in rushing with 830 yards on the season. His yards per carry went down to 3.6 however and he did not score a touchdown. He rushed for a career-high 165 yards against the San Francisco 49ers in a Week 7 win.

In training camp in 2004, Shipp broke his leg and dislocated his ankle, forcing him to miss the entire 2004 season and he was placed on injured reserve. He did not play at all that year. Following the missed 2004 season Shipp still remained with the Cardinals. In 2005, he was again the Cardinals' leading rusher, but this time with only 451 yards on 157 carries, for 2.9 yards per carry. In 2006 Shipp saw much less action, as the Cardinals had signed Edgerrin James. He rushed 17 times for 41 yards. He did have 4 touchdowns, scoring for the first time since 2002, including 3 touchdowns in one game on December 3 against the St. Louis Rams. In 2007, he had limited duty again, with 15 carries for 41 yards, still backing up James. In 2008, Shipp signed a 3-year contract with the Cardinals. However, he was released by the team on August 4.

=== Houston Texans ===
On August 18, 2008, Shipp agreed to terms with the Houston Texans, but was later released on August 29.

His career NFL stats are 605 rushes for 2,197 yards (3.6 yards per carry) and 11 rushing touchdowns. He has 109 receptions for 912 yards and 3 receiving touchdowns.

=== Las Vegas Locomotives ===
Shipp signed with the Las Vegas Locomotives of the United Football League on August 25, 2009. He finished the 2009 UFL season with 72 carries for 257 rushing yards, good for fourth in the league. Shipp's Locomotives defeated the Florida Tuskers 20–17 in overtime to win the inaugural UFL championship game.

Shipp returned with the team for the 2010 season. The Locomotives won a second straight championship again defeating the Tuskers in the championship game. Shipp finished the regular season with 313 rushing yards (5th in the league) on 117 carries and four rushing touchdowns (tied for second in the league). In the championship game he had 16 carries for 43 yards.

In 2011 Shipp remained with the Locomotives for a third season, despite the UFL's continued financial problems. In only a four team league, the Locomotives went 3–1 with Shipp as their leading rusher. Shipp gained 164 yards on 49 carries and scored two touchdowns. The Locomotives did not win their third straight championship as they lost in the title game 17–3 to the Virginia Destroyers.

== NFL career statistics ==
Legend
**Bold**	Career high

Year	Team	Games		Rushing					Receiving				
Year	Team	GP	GS	Att	Yds	Avg	Lng	TD	Rec	Yds	Avg	Lng	TD
2001	ARI	11	0	0	0	0.0	0	0	0	0	0.0	0	0
2002	ARI	15	6	188	**834**	**4.4**	**56**	**6**	**38**	**413**	**10.9**	**80**	**3**
2003	ARI	**16**	**11**	**228**	830	3.6	36	0	30	184	6.1	34	0
2005	ARI	15	**11**	157	451	2.9	19	0	35	255	7.3	28	0
2006	ARI	15	0	17	41	2.4	9	4	6	60	10.0	22	0
2007	ARI	**16**	0	15	41	2.7	14	1	4	25	6.3	9	0
		88	28	605	2,197	3.6	56	11	113	937	8.3	80	3

== Coaching career ==
Since retiring from football Shipp has had various coaching stops over the past 4 seasons: 2012 he became the running backs coach of the Las Vegas Loco's of the UFL. 2013 he served as a coaching intern for the Arizona Cardinals 2014 he joined his alma matra UMass as the team's running backs coach 2015 he joined the New York Jets as the team's running backs coach. It was announced on January 3, 2017, that Shipp along with several other coaches were fired from the Jets' staff.
