= Memorial Stadium (Storrs) =

University of Connecticut Stadium (1953 and 2002)

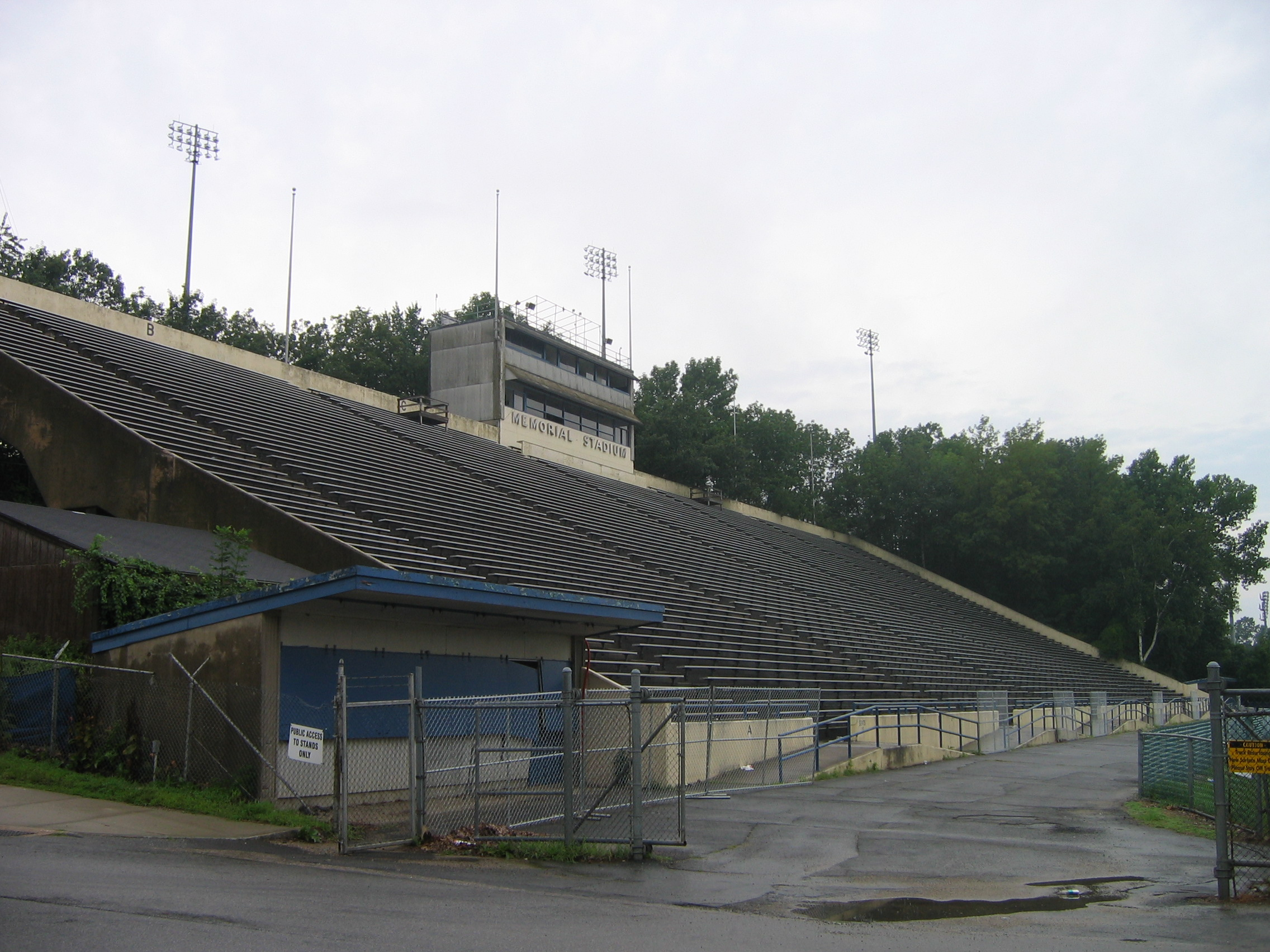
- Interactive map of Memorial Stadium
- Location: Stadium Road; Storrs, CT 06269
- Coordinates: 41°48′16″N 72°15′19″W
- Owner: State of Connecticut
- Capacity: 16,200

Construction
- Demolished: 2012

Tenant
- Connecticut Huskies (NCAA) 1953–2002

Memorial Stadium was a stadium in Storrs, Connecticut. It was primarily used for American football, and was the home field of the University of Connecticut football team from 1953 to 2002. The team's current home is Rentschler Field in East Hartford. It was built for UConn's move up to the NCAA's University Division (later known as Division I-A and now as the Football Bowl Subdivision) in college football.

The stadium held 16,200 people and was built in 1953. It was demolished in May 2012 to make way for a new $40 million basketball practice facility, the UConn Basketball Champions Center, which opened in 2014.

Events and tenants
Preceded by None	Host of the College Cup; 1959	Succeeded by Brooklyn College Field
