= Bill Snyder =

American football player and coach (born 1939)

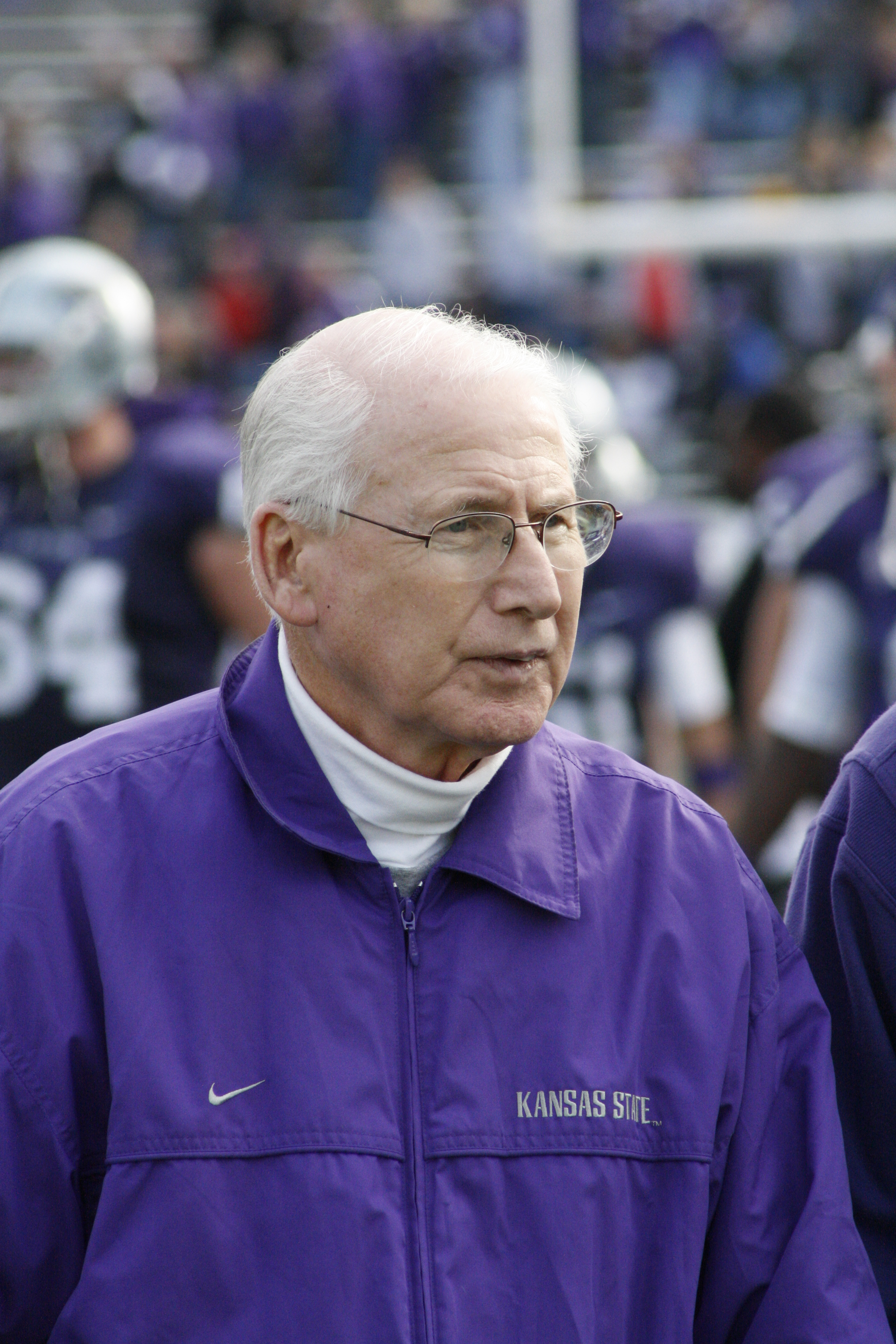
- Snyder in 2009

Current position
- Title: Special ambassador
- Team: Kansas State
- Conference: Big 12

Biographical details
- Born: October 7, 1939 (age 87); St. Joseph, Missouri, U.S.

Playing career
- 1958: Missouri
- 1959–1962: William Jewell
- Positions: Quarterback, defensive back

Coaching career (HC unless noted)
- 1962: Gallatin HS (MO) (assistant)
- 1964–1965: Indio HS (CA) (assistant)
- 1966: USC (GA)
- 1967–1968: Indio HS (CA)
- 1969–1973: Santa Ana Foothill HS (CA)
- 1974–1975: Austin (OC)
- 1976–1978: North Texas (assistant)
- 1979–1988: Iowa (OC/QB)
- 1989–2005: Kansas State
- 2009–2018: Kansas State

Administrative career (AD unless noted)
- 2018–present: Kansas State (special ambassador)

Head coaching record
- Overall: 215–117–1 (college)
- Bowls: 9–10

Accomplishments and honors

Championships
- 2 Big 12 (2003, 2012); 4 Big 12 North Division (1998, 1999, 2000, 2003)

Awards
- 3× Big Eight Conference Coach of the Year (1990, 1991, 1993); 4× Big 12 Coach of the Year (1998, 2002, 2011, 2012); Paul "Bear" Bryant Award (1998); Walter Camp Coach of the Year (1998); AP Coach of the Year (1998); 2× Bobby Dodd Coach of the Year Award (1998, 2012); Sporting News Coach of the Year (2011); Woody Hayes Coach of the Year (2011); Kansas State Hall of Fame (2008)
- College Football Hall of Fame; Inducted in 2015 (profile)

William D. Snyder (born October 7, 1939) is an American retired college football coach and former player. He served as the head football coach at Kansas State University from 1989 to 2005 and again from 2009 to 2018. Snyder initially retired from the position from 2006 to 2008 before being rehired. Snyder retired for the second time on December 2, 2018, and is serving as a special ambassador for the athletics department.

Snyder was inducted into the College Football Hall of Fame in 2015 and won several conference and national coach of the year awards. He was the head coach at Kansas State for the program's 300th, 400th, and 500th all-time wins. In recognition of his contributions to the program, Kansas State has named its home field the Bill Snyder Family Football Stadium.

== Early life ==
Snyder was born October 7, 1939, in St. Joseph, Missouri, the son of Tom, a traveling salesman, and Marionetta Snyder. His parents divorced when he was six; Snyder and his mother moved from Salina, Kansas to St. Joseph, Missouri, where they lived in a one-room, second-floor apartment, and Marionetta worked as a sales clerk in a department store while Bill's father lived in Omaha, Nebraska. Snyder attended Lafayette High School in St. Joseph, graduating in 1957.

Snyder attended the University of Missouri for one year before enrolling at William Jewell College in Liberty, Missouri, where he earned three letters in football for the Cardinals as a defensive back and halfback. He earned a Bachelor of Arts degree from William Jewell in 1963. He earned his Master of Arts degree from Eastern New Mexico University in 1965.

== Coaching career ==
Snyder had his first collegiate coaching experience in 1966, serving as a graduate assistant coach for the USC Trojans. He next worked as a head coach for several years in the California high school ranks. He then served as an assistant football coach, and also coached swimming, at Austin College in Sherman, Texas, from 1974 to 1975. From 1976 to 1978, Snyder worked as an assistant coach at North Texas State, under Hall of Fame coach Hayden Fry.

Snyder and Fry moved together to the University of Iowa in 1979, with Snyder serving as Fry's offensive coordinator for the next 10 years. He helped Fry build Iowa from a program that had not had a winning season since 1961 into a two-time Big Ten champion. Snyder was hired as the 32nd head coach of the Kansas State University Wildcats following the 1988 season.

=== Kansas State University: first tenure, 1989–2005 ===
When Snyder was hired at K-State for the first time on November 24, 1988, he inherited a situation that was several times worse than the one he'd found when he arrived in Iowa with Fry. Kansas State had a cumulative record of 299–510 (.370) in 93 years of play, which was easily the most losses of any team in Division I-A at the time. The school had been to only one bowl game (the 1982 Independence Bowl), had not won a conference title since 1934 and had enjoyed four winning seasons in the previous 54 years (including two in the previous 34 years). The program also had not won a game since October 26, 1986, going 0–26–1 in that time.

Prior to Snyder's first season in 1989, Sports Illustrated published an article about Kansas State football entitled "Futility U," which labeled the school "America's most hapless team." In hopes of distancing K-State from its losing history, Snyder had art professor Tom Bookwalter create a new logo for the team's helmets, a stylized wildcat's head known as the "Powercat."

Snyder won only one game in his first season, beating the recently renamed North Texas, but it was a significant win because it was K-State's first win in three seasons. The game was especially thrilling, with a touchdown pass coming on the last play of the game. In Snyder's second season, in 1990, the Wildcats improved to 5–6. The five wins posted by the team had been matched only twice in the prior 17 years at the school, in 1973 (5–6) and 1982 (6–5–1).

The 1991 season saw another breakthrough when the Wildcats finished with a winning record of 7–4 and narrowly missed a bowl bid. It was only the second winning season at Kansas State since 1970, and the team's 4–3 conference record was only the third winning conference mark since 1934.

Two years later, Snyder led the Wildcats to the 1993 Copper Bowl. It was the school's second bowl game, its first bowl win and the first of its 11 consecutive bowl appearances from 1993 to 2003—of which it won six—a streak matched by only six other teams. The 1993 season also marked the second nine-win season in school history and the team's first ranking in a final media poll.

During the 1995 season, Snyder led the Wildcats to the first 10-win season in school history. They also finished sixth in the AP Poll and seventh in the Coaches' Poll–their first top-ten finish in school history. This included a 41–7 thrashing of then-No. 6 Kansas in what was the only Governor's Cup between two ranked teams until the 2023 contest. That win was also Snyder's 40th victory at K-State, vaulting him past Mike Ahearn to become the winningest coach in school history.

Having never before won 11 games in a season, the Wildcats hit their stride from 1997 to 2000 with four consecutive 11-win seasons. By this time, the "Powercat" had all but replaced Kansas State's longtime mascot, "Willie the Wildcat," whose costume was redesigned to resemble the Powercat head.

During the 1998 season, Kansas State posted an undefeated 11–0 regular season and earned its first No. 1 ranking in the national polls, just ten years after being named the worst program in the country by Sports Illustrated. They lost to the Texas A&M Aggies in the Big 12 Championship Game, which has been called one of the greatest games played. The loss stopped them from reaching the national championship and sent them to the Alamo Bowl, where they lost and finished the season 11–2. In the 2003 season, the team won the Big 12 championship — the school's second major conference title and their first since 1934. At the time, the 69-year gap between conference titles was the longest in Division I history. They beat No. 1 ranked Oklahoma in the 2003 Big 12 Championship Game, 35–7. Leading up to the game, many college football analysts called Oklahoma one of the best teams. With an 11–4 record in 2003, Kansas State also became the only team in the country to win 11 games in six of the previous seven years and just the second program in the history of college football to win 11 games six times in a seven-year stretch.

Following disappointing seasons in 2004 and 2005, when the Wildcats went 4–7 and 5–6, respectively, Snyder retired from Kansas State on November 15, 2005, with an overall record of 136–68–1 (.667). Not only did this make him far and away the winningest coach in Kansas State history, but his 136 wins were as many as his combined predecessors had won in the 54 years prior to his arrival.

The day after Snyder announced his retirement, K-State renamed its football stadium Bill Snyder Family Football Stadium in his and his family's honor. The school had originally wanted to rename it simply Bill Snyder Stadium, but when Snyder got word of the plans, he insisted that they name it after his family — "the people I care about most." Ron Prince, formerly an assistant coach and offensive coordinator at the University of Virginia, was named Bill Snyder's replacement on December 5, 2005.

Snyder's first tenure at Kansas State is still considered one of the most successful rebuilding projects in collegiate history. In recognition of his rebuilding work, Hall of Fame football coach Barry Switzer once stated, "He's not the coach of the year, he's not the coach of the decade, he's the coach of the century."

=== Kansas State University: second tenure, 2009–2018 ===
After being out of coaching for three years, on November 24, 2008, Bill Snyder was named for a second term as head football coach at Kansas State University, beginning in the 2009 season. He is one of the few coaches to coach in a stadium or arena that is named for him.

In the first season of Snyder's second tenure, the team posted a 6–6 record overall and finished tied for second in the Big 12 North division with a 4–4 conference mark. In his second season in 2010, the team had a 7–6 record and played in the inaugural Pinstripe Bowl against the Big East's Syracuse University at Yankee Stadium in New York City.

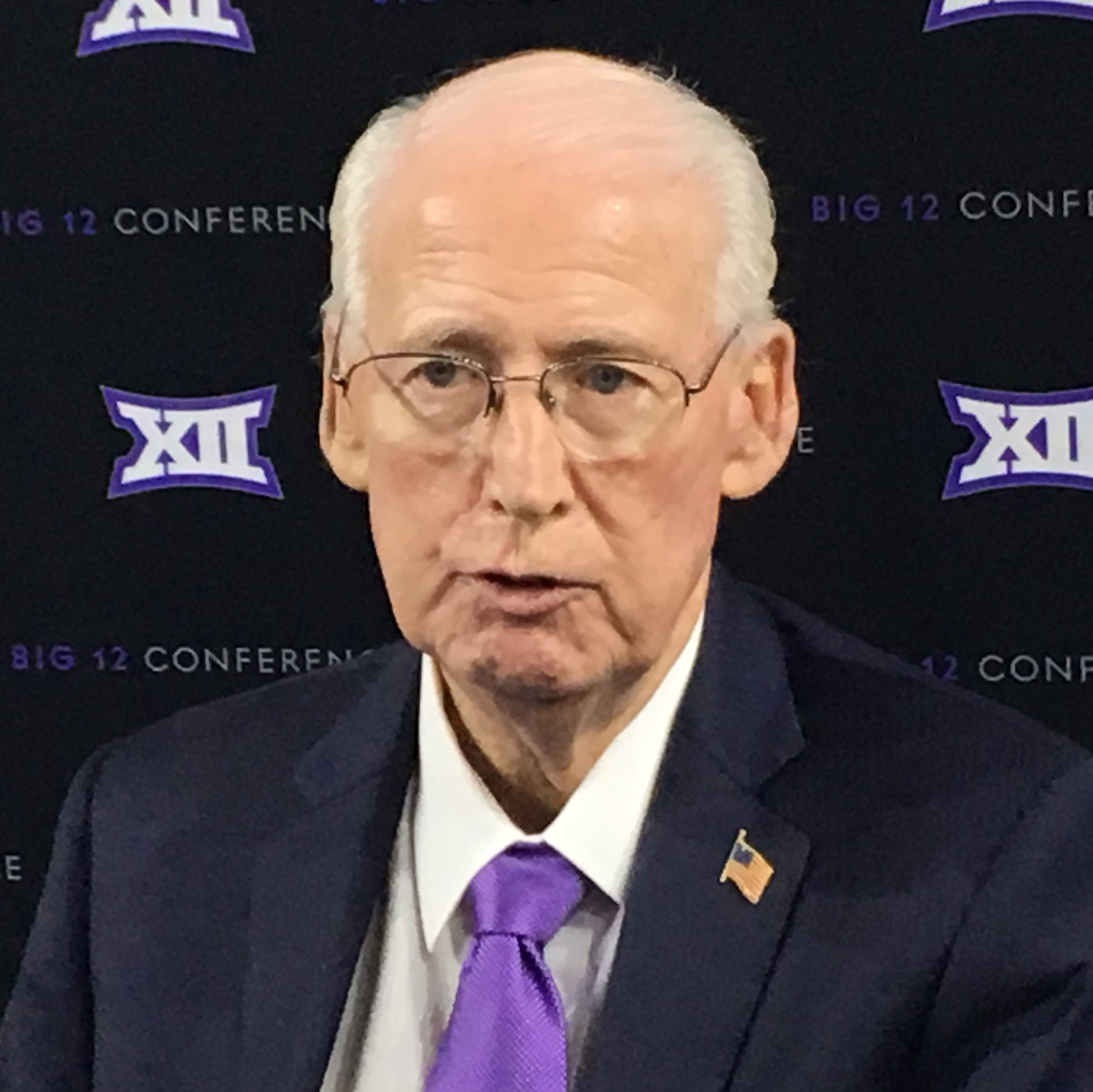
Snyder at 2017 Big 12 Media Days

Snyder earned his 150th win with a season opening victory over Eastern Kentucky on September 3, 2011. During the same season, Snyder became the first FBS coach to have a son (Sean) as an assistant and a grandson (Tate) playing for him at the same time. Coach Snyder led the 2011 team to a 10–2 record in the regular season, finishing second in the Big 12, and earned a berth in the Cotton Bowl. The Cotton Bowl was K-State's first "major" bowl since the 2004 Fiesta Bowl. They lost to Arkansas, 29–16. Following the season, Snyder was named Woody Hayes Coach of the Year.

In the 2012 season, Snyder led the team to its first Big 12 Conference championship since 2003. The 2012 team started the season 10–0 and reached the school's first #1 ranking in the BCS standings, before falling to the Baylor Bears in week 11. K-State represented the conference in the 2013 Fiesta Bowl, losing to the fifth-ranked Oregon Ducks 35–17. Following the season, Snyder won the Bobby Dodd Coach of the Year Award.

Snyder has held the head coaching position at Kansas State longer than any other coach. His 215 wins are not only far and away the most in K-State history (no one else has reached 40 wins), but also more than all other K-State football coaches from 1928 to present combined (189 wins). During his tenure, K-State produced 34 AP All-Americans, 47 NFL Draft picks, and 46 first-team academic All-Americans.

On January 31, 2013, it was announced that Snyder's contract was extended through the 2017 season.

On August 9, 2018, it was announced that Bill Snyder had signed a 5-year extension that will run through the 2022 season, worth $3.45 million with $300,000 bonuses, and incentives with them to be determined after 2 years.

On December 2, 2018, Snyder announced his retirement from coaching college football. Snyder finished his career with Kansas State with 215 victories and two Big 12 championships. He has accounted for over 40 percent of Kansas State's all-time wins as of 2018.

=== Former assistants who became head coaches ===
Eleven of Snyder's assistants have gone on to become head coaches at other Division I schools, including: Phil Bennett (SMU), Bret Bielema (Wisconsin, Arkansas, and Illinois), Jim Leavitt (South Florida), Mark Mangino (Kansas), Dana Dimel (Wyoming, UTEP and Houston), Bob Stoops (Oklahoma), Mike Stoops (Arizona), Carl Pelini (Florida Atlantic), Del Miller (Missouri State), Nick Quartaro (Fordham), Brent Venables (Oklahoma), and Collin Klein (Kansas State)

=== Awards ===
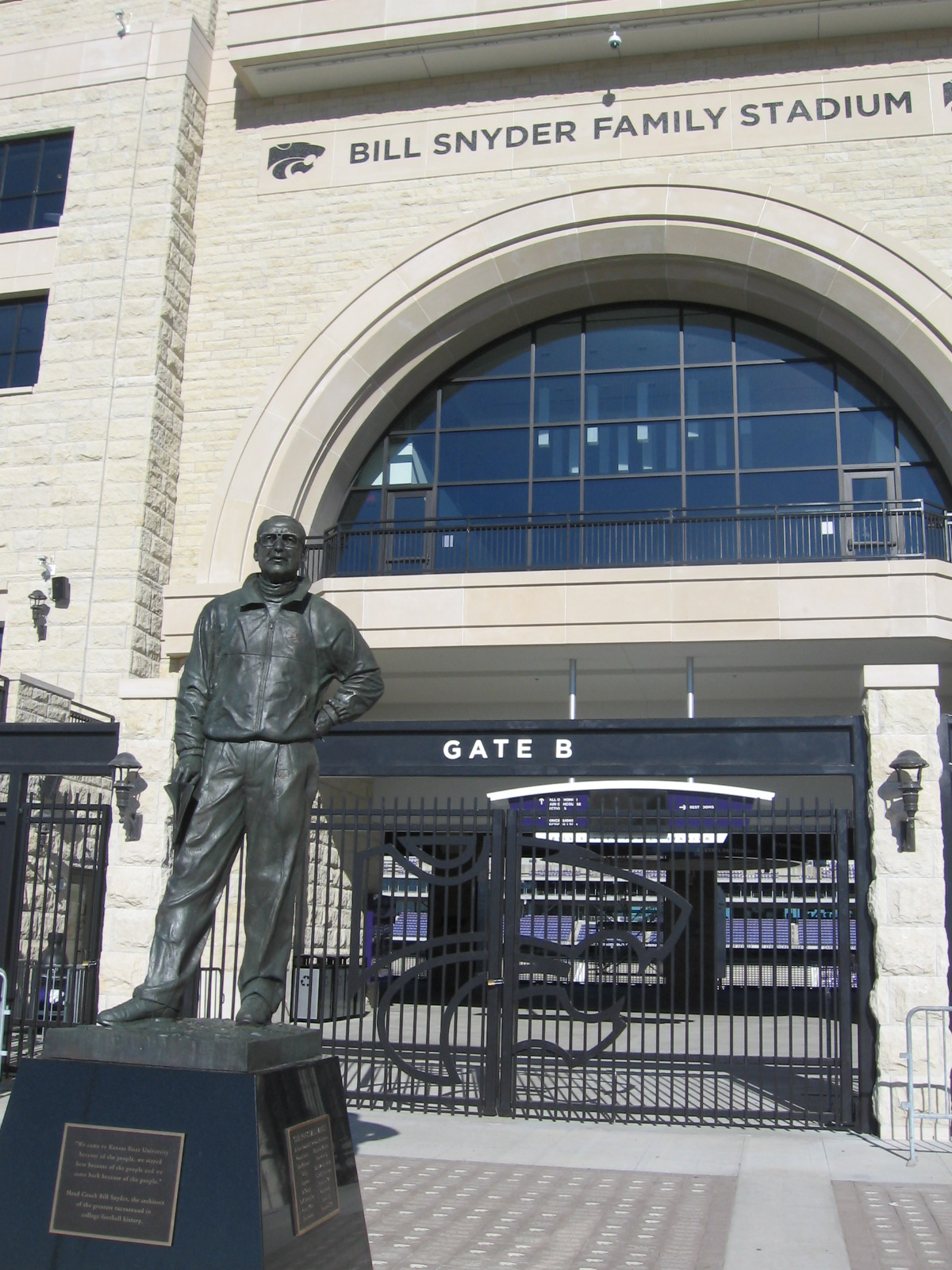
Snyder's statue outside Bill Snyder Family Stadium

On January 9, 2015, Snyder was announced as an inductee into the College Football Hall of Fame. Snyder is only the fourth active coach to receive this honor; under current Hall of Fame rules, active coaches are eligible for induction once they turn 75.

In 1998, Snyder was recognized as the National Coach of the Year by the Associated Press and the Walter Camp Football Foundation and was awarded the Bear Bryant Award and the Bobby Dodd Coach of the Year Award. In 2011, Snyder was named the Woody Hayes Coach of the Year and the Sporting News National Coach of the Year. In 2012, Snyder won the Bobby Dodd Coach of the Year Award for the second time in his career. Additionally, ESPN selected Snyder as its national coach of the year in 1991, and CNN selected him as its national coach of the year in 1995. He was also a finalist for the Bear Bryant Award in 1993, 1995, 2011 and 2012; a finalist for the Sporting News National Coach of the Year Award in 1995 and 1998; a finalist for the AFCA National Coach of the Year Award in 1993 and 1998; a finalist for the Liberty Mutual Coach of the Year Award in 2011 and 2012; a finalist for the Bobby Bowden National Collegiate Coach of the Year Award in 2012; and a finalist for the Eddie Robinson Coach of the Year award in 1993, 1995, 1998, 2011 and 2012.

In the conference, coach Snyder was selected Big Eight Conference Coach of the Year by the Associated Press three times (1990, 1991 and 1993). Snyder was also named Big 12 Conference Coach of the Year four times: in 1998 (AP, coaches), 2002 (coaches), 2011 (AP, coaches) and 2012 (AP, coaches).

In 2003, Snyder was named to the board of trustees of the American Football Coaches Association (AFCA). In 2006, Snyder was enshrined in the Kansas Sports Hall of Fame and the Missouri Sports Hall of Fame.

== Personal life ==
In addition to his work as the football coach, Snyder was active in raising funds for the library at Kansas State University. He also currently serves on the Staley School Advancement Council, honorary chairman of the K-State Changing Lives Campaign, and is past president of the Friends of the Libraries organization at K-State. The Staley School of Leadership Studies has also started the Bill Snyder Leadership Fellows in honor of Coach Snyder himself. In the window of retirement, Snyder invested his time in a Kansas State Department of Education endeavor called Kansas Mentors, becoming the chair.

Snyder and his wife Sharon have five children: Sean, Ross, Shannon, Meredith, and Whitney. They also have eight grandchildren.

== Head coaching record ==
Year	Team	Overall	Conference	Standing	Bowl/playoffs	Coaches^{#}	AP^{°}
Kansas State Wildcats (Big Eight Conference) (1989–1995)
1989	Kansas State	1–10	0–7	8th			
1990	Kansas State	5–6	2–5	6th			
1991	Kansas State	7–4	4–3	4th			
1992	Kansas State	5–6	2–5	T–6th			
1993	Kansas State	9–2–1	4–2–1	3rd	W Copper	18	20
1994	Kansas State	9–3	5–2	3rd	L Aloha	16	19
1995	Kansas State	10–2	5–2	T–2nd	W Holiday	6	7
Kansas State Wildcats (Big 12 Conference) (1996–2005)
1996	Kansas State	9–3	6–2	3rd (North)	L Cotton	17	17
1997	Kansas State	11–1	7–1	2nd (North)	W Fiesta^{†}	7	8
1998	Kansas State	11–2	8–0	1st (North)	L Alamo	9	10
1999	Kansas State	11–1	7–1	T–1st (North)	W Holiday	6	6
2000	Kansas State	11–3	6–2	T–1st (North)	W Cotton	8	9
2001	Kansas State	6–6	3–5	4th (North)	L Insight.com		
2002	Kansas State	11–2	6–2	2nd (North)	W Holiday	6	7
2003	Kansas State	11–4	6–2	1st (North)	L Fiesta^{†}	13	14
2004	Kansas State	4–7	2–6	5th (North)			
2005	Kansas State	5–6	2–6	6th (North)			
Kansas State Wildcats (Big 12 Conference) (2009–2018)
2009	Kansas State	6–6	4–4	T–2nd (North)			
2010	Kansas State	7–6	3–5	T–3rd (North)	L Pinstripe		
2011	Kansas State	10–3	7–2	2nd	L Cotton	16	15
2012	Kansas State	11–2	8–1	T–1st	L Fiesta^{†}	11	12
2013	Kansas State	8–5	5–4	5th	W Buffalo Wild Wings		
2014	Kansas State	9–4	7–2	3rd	L Alamo	18	18
2015	Kansas State	6–7	3–6	8th	L Liberty		
2016	Kansas State	9–4	6–3	4th	W Texas		
2017	Kansas State	8–5	5–4	T–4th	W Cactus		
2018	Kansas State	5–7	3–6	T–7th			
Kansas State:		215–117–1	128–89–1				
Total:		215–117–1					
National championship Conference title Conference division title or championship game berth
^{†}Indicates Bowl Alliance or BCS bowl.; ^{#}Rankings from final Coaches Poll.; ^{°}Rankings from final AP Poll.

== Player accomplishments ==
During the Snyder era(s), Kansas State players won the following national awards:

- Jack Tatum Trophy (Nation's top defensive back) – Chris Canty, 1996
- Lou Groza Award (Nation's outstanding kicker) – Martín Gramática, 1997
- Davey O'Brien Award (Nation's top quarterback) – Michael Bishop, 1998
- Jim Thorpe Award (Nation's outstanding defensive back) – Terence Newman, 2002
- Johnny Unitas Golden Arm Award (Nation's outstanding senior quarterback) – Collin Klein, 2012
- Kellen Moore Award (Nation's top quarterback) – Collin Klein, 2012
- Jet Award (Top return specialist) – Tyler Lockett, 2014

Heisman Trophy:

- Michael Bishop, finished second in the 1998 Heisman Trophy voting.
- Darren Sproles finished fifth in the 2003 Heisman Trophy voting.
- Collin Klein finished third in the 2012 Heisman Trophy voting

All Americans: During the Snyder era, 37 different players have received All-American Honors, including 10 consensus first-team All-Americans.

- Sean Snyder (P) 1992
- Andre Coleman (KR) 1993†
- Jaime Mendez (DB) 1993
- Thomas Randolph (DB) 1993
- Chad May (QB) 1994
- Barrett Brooks (OL) 1995†
- Tim Colston (DL) 1995
- Percell Gaskins (LB) 1995†
- Chris Canty (DB) 1995–1996
- Todd Weiner (OL) 1997†
- Martín Gramática (PK) 1997–1998
- Michael Bishop (QB) 1998
- Jarrod Cooper (DB) 1998†
- Jeff Kelly (LB) 1998
- David Allen (PR) 1998–1999
- Mark Simoneau (LB) 1998†–1999
- Lamar Chapman (DB) 1999†
- Aaron Lockett (WR/KR/PR) 2000†
- Quincy Morgan (WR) 2000
- Jamie Rheem (PK) 2000
- Mario Fatafehi (DL) 2000
- Terence Newman (DB) 2002
- Nick Leckey (OL) 2002–2003
- Darren Sproles (RB) 2003
- Josh Buhl (LB) 2003
- William Powell (KR) 2010
- Tyler Lockett (KR/WR) 2011, 2013†, 2014
- Collin Klein (QB) 2012†
- Arthur Brown (LB) 2012
- Ryan Mueller (DL) 2013†
- Ty Zimmerman (DB) 2013†
- Morgan Burns (KR), 2015
- Jordan Willis (DE), 2016†

†-2nd team All-American

== Coaching tree ==
Played under:

- Dan Devine, Missouri
- Norris Patterson, William Jewell College

Coached under:

- John McKay, USC
- Larry Kramer, Austin
- Hayden Fry, North Texas, Iowa

Assistant coaches who became college or NFL head coaches:

- Phil Bennett, SMU (2002–2007), Pittsburgh (2010)
- Bret Bielema, Wisconsin (2007–2012), Arkansas (2013–2017), Illinois (2021–present)
- Dana Dimel, Wyoming (1997–1999), Houston (2000–2002), UTEP (2018–2023)
- Collin Klein, Kansas State (2025–present)
- Jim Leavitt, South Florida (1997–2009)
- Mark Mangino, Kansas (2002–2009)
- Manny Matsakis, Emporia State (1995–1998), Texas State (2003), Bethany (2013–2014)
- Del Miller, Missouri State (1995–1998)
- Carl Pelini, Florida Atlantic (2012–2013)
- Ricky Rahne: Old Dominion (2020–present)
- Rex Ryan: New York Jets (2009–2014), Buffalo Bills (2015–2016)
- Bob Stoops, Oklahoma (1999–2016)
- Mike Stoops, Arizona (2004–2011)
- Eric Wolford, Youngstown State (2010–2014)
- Brent Venables, Oklahoma (2022–present)
- Tim Beck, Coastal Carolina (2023–2025)

== See also ==
- List of college football career coaching wins leaders
- List of college football head coaches with non-consecutive tenure
