= Ryan Young =

American football player (born 1976)

No. 74, 75
- Position: Tackle

Personal information
- Born: June 28, 1976 (age 50); St. Louis, Missouri, U.S.
- Listed height: 6 ft 5 in (1.96 m)
- Listed weight: 320 lb (145 kg)

Career information
- High school: Parkway Central (MO)
- College: Kansas State
- NFL draft: 1999: 7th round, 223rd overall pick
- Expansion draft: 2002: 1st round, 2nd overall pick

Career history
- New York Jets (1999–2001); Houston Texans (2002); Dallas Cowboys (2003)

Awards and highlights
- 2× third-team All-Big 12 (1996, 1997); First-team All-Big 12 (1998)

Career NFL statistics
- Games Played: 67
- Games Started: 55
- Stats at Pro Football Reference

Ryan Young (born June 28, 1976) is an American former professional football player who was an offensive tackle in the National Football League (NFL) for the New York Jets, Houston Texans and Dallas Cowboys. He played college football at Kansas State University.

== Early life ==
Young (nicknamed Big Mac), graduated from Parkway Central High School in Chesterfield, Missouri, in 1994. He played as a two-way tackle, receiving All-state and All-conference (twice) honors. He was a teammate of future NFL player Isaac Byrd. He practiced basketball and participated in the school's choir.

He accepted a football scholarship from Kansas State University, where he was named the starter at left tackle as a sophomore. He received All-Big 12 honors as a senior. He played in the Cotton, Fiesta and Alamo Bowls.

== Professional career ==
=== New York Jets ===
Young was selected by the New York Jets in the seventh round (223rd overall) of the 1999 NFL draft. He started the last seven games at right tackle as a rookie, after Jason Fabini was lost for the season. The next two years he was the regular starter at right tackle and helped to block for All-Pro running back Curtis Martin.

=== Houston Texans ===
Young was selected by the Houston Texans second overall in the 2002 NFL expansion draft. After playing in 48 straight games in his career, he suffered a torn muscle in his groin during training camp, missing most of the preseason and the first five games of the season. He also was limited in December with a knee injury. He appeared in nine games (eight starts) at right tackle. At the end of the year, he was declared a free agent and did not accept the Texans contract offer.

=== Dallas Cowboys ===
On March 5, 2003, he was signed as a free agent by the Dallas Cowboys, reuniting him with his former Jets head coach Bill Parcells. He began the season as the starter at right tackle, but suffered a right knee injury. After starting six of the first seven games, he would only appear in four additional games (two starts). On March 2, 2004, he was waived because of his chronic knee condition.
