= 1998 All-America college football team =

Official list of the best college football players of 1998

The 1998 All-America college football team is composed of the following All-American Teams: Associated Press, Football Writers Association of America, American Football Coaches Association, Walter Camp Foundation, The Sporting News and Football News.

The College Football All-America Team is an honor given annually to the best American college football players at their respective positions. The original usage of the term All-America seems to have been to such a list selected by football pioneer Walter Camp in the 1890s. The NCAA officially recognizes All-Americans selected by the AP, AFCA, FWAA, TSN, and the WCFF to determine Consensus All-Americans.

== Offense ==
=== Quarterback ===
- Tim Couch, Kentucky (FWAA, Walter Camp, AP-2)
- Cade McNown, UCLA (AFCA, AP-1)
- Michael Bishop, Kansas State (TSN, FN, AP-3)

=== Running back ===
- Ricky Williams, Texas (AFCA, AP-1, FWAA, TSN, Walter Camp, FN, AP-3)
- Mike Cloud, Boston College (AFCA, AP-1, FWAA)
- Ron Dayne, Wisconsin (Walter Camp)
- Devin West, Missouri (TSN, FN, AP-2)
- Autry Denson, Notre Dame (AP-2)
- Trung Canidate, Arizona (AP-3)

=== Wide receiver ===
- Torry Holt, NC State (AFCA, AP-1, FWAA, TSN, FN)
- Troy Edwards, Louisiana Tech (AFCA, FWAA, Walter Camp, AP-2)
- Peter Warrick, Florida State (AP-1, TSN, Walter Camp)
- David Boston, Ohio State (FWAA, FN, AP-2)
- Darnell McDonald, Kansas State (AP-3)
- Travis McGriff, Florida (AP-3)

=== Tight end ===
- Rufus French, Ole Miss (AFCA, AP-1, TSN, Walter Camp, FN)
- Sheldon Jackson, Nebraska (AP-2)
- Ibn Green, Louisville (AP-3)

=== Tackle ===
- Kris Farris, UCLA (AP-1, FWAA, TSN, Walter Camp, FN)
- Aaron Gibson, Wisconsin (AFCA, AP-1, FWAA, Walter Camp, FN)
- Rob Murphy, Ohio State (AP-1)
- Matt Stinchcomb, Georgia (AFCA, AP-1, Walter Camp, FN)
- Jay Humphrey, Texas (TSN, AP-2)
- Jon Jansen, Michigan (AFCA, AP-3)
- Mike Rosenthal, Notre Dame (Walter Camp, AP-2)

=== Center ===
- Craig Page, Georgia Tech (AP-1, FWAA, TSN)
- Todd McClure, LSU (AFCA)
- Grey Ruegamer, Arizona State (Walter Camp, AP-2)
- Eric de Groh, West Virginia (AP-3)

== Defense ==
=== End ===
- Tom Burke, Wisconsin (AFCA, AP-1, FWAA, TSN, Walter Camp, FN)
- Montae Reagor, Texas Tech (AFCA, AP-1, FWAA, TSN, Walter Camp)
- Patrick Kerney, Virginia (FWAA, FN, AP-2)
- Corey Moore, Virginia Tech (AFCA, AP-2)
- Robaire Smith, Michigan State (Walter Camp)
- Inoke Breckterfield, Oregon State (AP-3)
- Adalius Thomas, Southern Miss (AP-3)

=== Tackle ===
- Jared DeVries, Iowa (AFCA, TSN, Walter Camp, AP-2)
- Booger McFarland, LSU (AP-1, FN)
- Corey Simon, Florida State (AP-1)
- Ed Chester, Florida (AP-2)
- Rosevelt Colvin, Purdue (AP-3)
- Kelly Gregg, Oklahoma (AP-3)

=== Linebacker ===
- Chris Claiborne, USC (AFCA, AP-1, FWAA, TSN, Walter Camp, FN)
- Dat Nguyen, Texas A&M (AFCA, AP-1, FWAA, TSN, Walter Camp, FN)
- Al Wilson, Tennessee (AFCA, AP-1, FWAA)
- Jeff Kelly, Kansas State (AP-1, FWAA)
- Jevon Kearse, Florida (Walter Camp, FN, AP-2)
- Adalius Thomas, Southern Miss (AFCA)
- LaVar Arrington, Penn State (TSN, AP-2)
- Mike Peterson, Florida (TSN, AP-2)
- Mark Simoneau, Kansas State (AP-2)
- JoJuan Armour, Miami (OH) (AP-3)
- Andy Katzenmoyer, Ohio State (AP-3)
- Raynoch Thompson, Tennessee (AP-3)
- Nate Webster, Miami (AP-3)

=== Cornerback ===
- Chris McAlister, Arizona (AFCA, AP-1, FWAA, TSN, Walter Camp, FN)
- Antoine Winfield, Ohio State (AFCA, AP-1, FWAA, TSN, Walter Camp, FN)
- Champ Bailey, Georgia (AFCA, AP-1, FWAA, Walter Camp, FN)
- Dré Bly, North Carolina (Walter Camp, AP-2)
- Larry Atkins, UCLA (AP-2)
- Ralph Brown, Nebraska (AP-3)
- Lloyd Harrison, NC State (AP-3)

=== Safety ===
- Anthony Poindexter, Virginia (AP-1, FWAA, TSN)
- Damon Moore, Ohio State (TSN, AP-2)
- Tyrone Carter, Minnesota (FN, AP-2)
- Antuan Edwards, Clemson (AP-3)
- Daylon McCutcheon, USC (AP-3)

== Special teams ==
=== Kicker ===
- Sebastian Janikowski, Florida State (AP-1, FWAA, TSN, FN)
- Martín Gramática, Kansas State (AFCA, Walter Camp, AP-2)
- Nathan Villegas, Oregon (AP-3)

=== Punter ===
- Joe Kristosik, UNLV (AFCA, AP-1, FWAA, Walter Camp, FN)
- Shane Lechler, Texas A&M (TSN, AP-3)
- Josh Bidwell, Oregon (AP-2)

=== All-purpose player / return specialist ===
- David Allen, Kansas State (AP-1, FWAA, TSN)
- Kevin Johnson, Syracuse (AFCA)
- J. R. Redmond, Arizona State (AP-2)
- Kevin Faulk, LSU (AP-3)

== See also ==
- 1998 All-Atlantic Coast Conference football team
- 1998 All-Big 12 Conference football team
- 1998 All-Big Ten Conference football team
- 1998 All-Pacific-10 Conference football team
- 1998 All-SEC football team
