= Phil Bennett (American football) =

American football player and coach (born 1955)

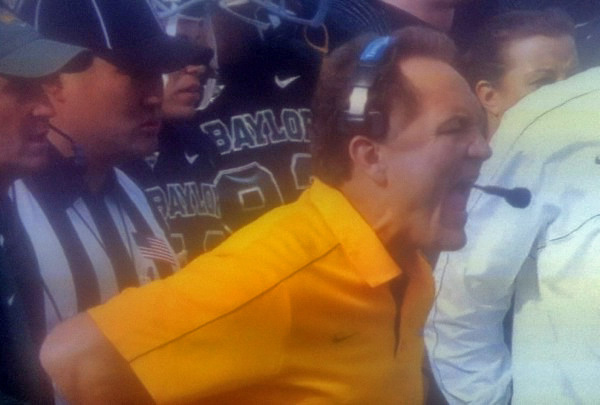

Biographical details
- Born: December 3, 1955 (age 70); Marshall, Texas, U.S.

Playing career
- 1974–1977: Texas A&M
- Position: Defensive end

Coaching career (HC unless noted)
- 1978–1981: Texas A&M (DE)
- 1982: TCU (TE/T)
- 1983: MacArthur HS (TX) (DC)
- 1984: Iowa State (LB)
- 1985–1986: Iowa State (DC)
- 1987–1990: Purdue (DC)
- 1991: LSU (OLB)
- 1992–1993: LSU (AHC/LB)
- 1994: LSU (AHC/DC)
- 1995–1996: Texas A&M (DC)
- 1997: TCU (DC/DB)
- 1998: Oklahoma (DB/Co-RC)
- 1999–2001: Kansas State (DC)
- 2002–2007: SMU
- 2008–2010: Pittsburgh (DC)
- 2010: Pittsburgh (interim HC)
- 2011–2016: Baylor (DC)
- 2017: Arizona State (DC)
- 2021–2022: North Texas (DC/S)
- 2022: North Texas (interim HC)

Head coaching record
- Overall: 19–53
- Bowls: 1–1

Phil Bennett (born December 3, 1955) is an American former college football coach and player. He was most recently the interim head coach at North Texas. Prior to this, he spent three seasons out of coaching. He has previously served as the defensive coordinator at Arizona State Sun Devils in 2017, the defensive coordinator for the Baylor Bears from 2011-2016, and was interim head coach of the Pittsburgh Panthers during their 2011 BBVA Compass Bowl win over Kentucky after serving as defensive coordinator of the Panthers for three seasons. Prior to coaching the Panthers, he served as the head football coach at Southern Methodist University (SMU) from 2002 to 2007. Before his stint at SMU, he served as an assistant coach at seven different colleges.

== Coaching career ==
Bennett graduated from Texas A&M University with a degree in education in 1978, and was a second-team All-Southwest Conference defensive end as a senior in 1977. He began his coaching career at A&M in 1979 as a part-time defensive ends coach. Since then, he has also held coaching positions at Texas Christian University (1982, 1997), Iowa State University (1983–1986), Purdue University (1987–1990), Louisiana State University (1991–1994), a second stint at Texas A&M (1995–1996), the University of Oklahoma (1998), and Kansas State University (1999–2001).

During his first season at Kansas State, in 1999, he was nominated for National Assistant Coach of the Year. During his years as an assistant coach he has coached many stand out players and future NFL players, including Mark Simoneau Monty Beisel, Jerametrius Butler, Dyshod Carter, Lamar Chapman, Jarrod Cooper, Mario Fatafehi, Darren Howard, Ben Leber, Jon McGraw, Terry Pierce and Terence Newman.

On October 28, 2007, SMU athletic director Steve Orsini fired Bennett. Orsini notified Bennett that he would be dismissed after the Mustangs' last game on November 24, 2007 against the University of Memphis.

University of Pittsburgh head coach Dave Wannstedt named Bennett his defensive coordinator on February 4, 2008. After Wannstedt's resignation in December 2010, he announced on January 3, 2011 that he was declining to coach in the BBVA Compass Bowl. Bennett was promoted to interim head coach of the team and lead the Panthers to a 27–10 victory over Kentucky.

On January 7, 2011, it was announced that Phil Bennett would join the Baylor Bears as defensive coordinator, replacing Brian Norwood who accepted the position of associate head coach for Baylor.

On May 26, 2016, it was announced that Baylor was firing Art Briles as head coach. Bennett was a candidate to serve as interim head coach, but that position ultimately went to Jim Grobe.

On January 21, 2021, Bennett was named defensive coordinator and safeties coach for the North Texas Mean Green football team.

== Personal life ==
On August 11, 1999, Bennett's 41-year-old wife, Nancy, was killed by lightning while she was jogging near their home in Manhattan, Kansas. The story of the Bennetts' relationship and the subsequent death of Nancy was the subject of a 1999 feature article in Sports Illustrated, as well as College Gameday on December 6, 2014. Bennett has a son, Sam, who is currently a Linebacker coach at Incarnate Word. He also has a daughter, Maddie, who followed in her mother's footsteps and became a nurse. Bennett married a long time friend Julie White Bennett in 2005 and has two stepdaughters; Katie and Megan.

== Head coaching record ==
Year	Team	Overall	Conference	Standing	Bowl/playoffs
SMU Mustangs (Western Athletic Conference) (2002–2004)
2002	SMU	3–9	3–5	T–6th	
2003	SMU	0–12	0–8	10th	
2004	SMU	3–8	3–5	T–6th	
SMU Mustangs (Conference USA) (2005–2007)
2005	SMU	5–6	4–4	T–3rd (West)	
2006	SMU	6–6	4–4	4th (West)	
2007	SMU	1–11	0–8	6th (West)	
SMU:		18–52	14–34		
Pittsburgh Panthers (Big East Conference) (2010)
2010	Pittsburgh	1–0			W BBVA Compass
Pittsburgh:		1–0			
North Texas Mean Green (Conference USA) (2022)
2022	North Texas	0–1			L Frisco
North Texas:		0–1			
Total:		19–53			
