= 1998 Alamo Bowl =

1998 Builders Square Alamo Bowl
Kansas State Wildcats	Purdue Boilermakers
(11–1)	(8–4)
Big 12	Big Ten
34	37
Head coach: Bill Snyder	Head coach: Joe Tiller
AP / Coaches / BCS; 4 / 4 / 3	AP / Coaches / BCS; NR / NR / NR
	1	2	3	4	Total
Kansas State	0	7	6	21	34
Purdue	0	17	10	10	37
- Date: December 29, 1998
- Season: 1998
- Stadium: Alamodome
- Location: San Antonio, Texas
- MVP: Drew Brees (QB, Purdue); Rosevelt Colvin (DE, Purdue)
- Favorite: Kansas State by 14
- Referee: Ron Cherry (ACC)
- Attendance: 60,780

United States TV coverage
- Network: ESPN
- Announcers: Ron Franklin (play-by-play), Mike Gottfried (analyst) and Adrian Karsten (sideline)

The 1998 Alamo Bowl featured the Kansas State Wildcats and the Purdue Boilermakers.

The Wildcats came into the game fresh off a double overtime loss in the Big 12 Championship Game to the Texas A&M Aggies, which ruined their chance at a national championship in the Fiesta Bowl. With an experienced quarterback, Michael Bishop, the Heisman Trophy runner-up, and one of the best offenses and defenses in the country, the Wildcats were generally expected to have an easy bowl victory.

The unranked Purdue Boilermakers finished fourth in the Big Ten Conference. The Boilermakers' starting quarterback Drew Brees, a sophomore, was a first-year starter and relatively inexperienced.

The Wildcats finished with a #3 ranking in the BCS and thought they deserved to play in one of the BCS bowl games. Kansas State was unable to overcome the Boilermakers, who drove 80 yards for a touchdown in the final minute to shock Kansas State, 37–34.

After this season, the "Kansas State Rule" was created, making the #3 spot an automatic bid. Kansas State finished ranked #6 in the BCS the following season, only to be left out of the BCS once again.

The win was selected as the second best win for Purdue during the Joe Tiller era by Purdue blog Off the Tracks.

== Scoring summary ==
Second Quarter
PU- Daniels 5 pass from Brees (Dorsch kick) 14:47
PU- FG Dorsch 25 13:03
KSU- Mcdonald 1 pass from Bishop (Gramatica kick) 9:49
PU- Jones 30 pass from Brees (Dorsch kick) 8:36

Third Quarter
KSU- Havick recovered fumble in end zone (kick failed) 8:06
PU- Nugent recovered fumble in end zone (Dorsch kick) 0:52
PU- FG Dorsch 26 0:04

Fourth Quarter
KSU- Allen 3 run (Gramatica kick) 11:59
PU- FG Dorsch 37 6:44
KSU- Mcdonald 88 pass from Bishop (Gramatica kick) 6:23
KSU- Swift 2 pass from Bishop (Gramatica kick) 1:24
PU- Jones 24 pass from Brees (Dorsch kick) 0:30

== Stats ==
Rushing KSU- Allen 13-83, Hickson 7-35, Bishop 20-7 PU- Crabtree 12-46, Brees 10-25

Passing KSU- Bishop 9-24—182 PU- Brees 25-53—230

Receiving KSU- Mcdonald 5-124, Peries 1-52 PU- Jones 11-98, Daniels 6-47, Sutherland 3-53, Lane 3-25
