= 1998 All-Big 12 Conference football team =

The 1998 All-Big 12 Conference football team consists of American football players chosen as All-Big 12 Conference players for the 1998 NCAA Division I-A football season. The conference recognizes two official All-Big 12 selectors: (1) the Big 12 conference coaches selected separate offensive and defensive units and named first-, second- and third-team players (the "Coaches" team); and (2) a panel of sports writers and broadcasters covering the Big 12 also selected offensive and defensive units and named first- and second-team players (the "Media" team).

== Offensive selections ==
=== Quarterbacks ===
- Michael Bishop, Kansas State (Coaches-1; Media-1)
- Major Applewhite, Texas (Media-2)
- Corby Jones, Missouri (Coaches-2)

=== Running backs ===
- Ricky Williams, Texas (Coaches-1; Media-1)
- Devin West, Missouri (Coaches-1; Media-1)
- Ricky Williams, Texas Tech (Coaches-2; Media-2)
- De'Mond Parker, Oklahoma (Media-2)
- Darren Davis, Iowa State (Media-2)
- Nathan Simmons, Oklahoma State (Coaches-2)

=== Centers ===
- Rob Riti, Missouri (Coaches-1; Media-1)
- Josh Heskew, Nebraska (Coaches-1; Media-1)
- Jeremy Offutt, Oklahoma State (Coaches-2)

=== Guards ===
- Craig Heimburger, Missouri (Coaches-1; Media-1)
- Ben Adams, Texas (Coaches-2; Media-1)
- Adam Davis, Oklahoma State (Coaches-2; Media-2)
- Curtis Lowery, Texas Tech (Coaches-2; Media-2)

=== Tackles ===
- Ryan Young, Kansas State (Coaches-1; Media-1)
- Jay Humphrey, Texas (Coaches-1; Media-2)
- Derrick Fletcher, Baylor (Coaches-2)
- Ryan Johanningmeier, Colorado (Media-2)
- Todd Neimeyer, Missouri (Media-2)

=== Tight ends ===
- Sheldon Jackson, Nebraska (Coaches-2; Media-1)
- Derek Lewis, Texas (Coaches-1; Media-2)

=== Receivers ===
- Darnell McDonald, Kansas State (Coaches-1; Media-1)
- Wane McGarity, Texas (Coaches-1; Media-1)
- Donnie Hart, Texas Tech (Coaches-2; Media-2)
- Darrin Chiaverini, Colorado (Coaches-2; Media-2)
- Damien Groce, Iowa State (Coaches-2)

== Defensive selections ==
=== Defensive linemen ===
- Kelly Gregg, Oklahoma (Coaches-1; Media-1)
- Darren Howard, Kansas State (Coaches-1; Media-1)
- Montae Reagor, Texas Tech (Coaches-1; Media-1)
- Taurus Rucker, Texas Tech (Coaches-1)
- Justin Wyatt, Missouri (Coaches-1)
- Chad Kelsay, Nebraska (Coaches-2; Media-2)
- Mike Rucker, Nebraska (Coaches-2; Media-2)
- Casey Hampton, Texas (Coaches-2)
- Aaron Humphrey, Texas (Media-2)
- Aaron Marshall, Colorado (Coaches-2)
- Damion McIntosh, Kansas State (Coaches-2)

=== Linebackers ===
- Jeff Kelly, Kansas State (Coaches-1; Media-1)
- Dat Nguyen, Texas A&M (Coaches-1; Media-1)
- Mark Simoneau, Kansas State (Coaches-2; Media-1)
- Warrick Holdman, Texas A&M (Media-1)
- Kenyatta Wright, Oklahoma State (Coaches-2; Media-2)
- Pat Brown, Kansas (Media-2)
- Jay Foreman, Nebraska (Media-2)
- Sedric Jones, Oklahoma (Media-2)
- Travis Ochs, Kansas State (Media-2)

=== Defensive backs ===
- Ralph Brown, Nebraska, (Coaches-1; Media-1)
- Jarrod Cooper, Kansas State (Coaches-1; Media-1)
- Harold Piersey, Missouri (Coaches-1; Media-1)
- Lamar Chapman, Kansas State (Coaches-1; Media-2)
- Rich Coady, Texas A&M (Media-1)
- Gary Baxter, Baylor (Coaches-2; Media-2)
- Mike Brown, Nebraska (Coaches-2; Media-2)
- Wade Perkins, Missouri (Coaches-2; Media-2)
- Ben Kelly, Colorado (Media-2)
- Ricky Thompson, Oklahoma State (Media-2)
- Jason Webster, Texas A&M (Media-2)
- Mike Woods, Oklahoma (Coaches-2)

== Special teams ==
=== Kickers ===
- Martín Gramática, Kansas State (Coaches-1; Media-1)
- Chris Birkholz, Texas Tech (Media-2)
- Kris Brown, Nebraska (Coaches-2)

=== Punters ===
- Shane Lechler, Texas A&M (Coaches-1; Media-1)
- Kyle Atteberry, Baylor (Coaches-2; Media-2)

=== Return specialists ===
- David Allen, Kansas State (Coaches-1; Media-1)
- Ben Kelly, Colorado (Media-1)
- Joe Walker, Nebraska (Coaches-2; Media-2)

== Key ==
Bold = selected as a first-team player by both the coaches and media panel

Coaches = selected by Big 12 Conference coaches

Media = selected by a media panel

== See also ==
- 1998 College Football All-America Team
