= 1999 All-Big 12 Conference football team =

The 1999 All-Big 12 Conference football team consists of American football players chosen as All-Big 12 Conference players for the 1999 NCAA Division I-A football season. The conference recognizes two official All-Big 12 selectors: (1) the Big 12 conference coaches selected separate offensive and defensive units and named first- and second-team players (the "Coaches" team); and (2) a panel of sports writers and broadcasters covering the Big 12 also selected offensive and defensive units and named first- and second-team players (the "Media" team).

== Offensive selections ==
=== Quarterbacks ===
- Major Applewhite, Texas (Coaches-1 (tie); Media-1)
- Eric Crouch, Nebraska (Coaches-1 (tie); Media-2)
- Josh Heupel, Oklahoma (Coaches-2)

=== Running backs ===
- Darren Davis, Iowa State (Coaches-1; Media-1)
- Hodges Mitchell, Texas (Coaches-1; Media-1)
- Sammy Morris, Texas Tech (Coaches-2)
- Cortlen Johnson, Colorado (Coaches-2)

=== Centers ===
- Rob Riti, Missouri (Coaches-1)
- Dominic Raiola, Nebraska (Coaches-1)
- Russ Hochstein, Nebraska (Coaches-2; Media-1)

=== Guards ===
- Roger Roesler, Texas (Coaches-1; Media-1)
- Randall Cummins, Kansas State (Coaches-1)
- Brad Bedell, Colorado (Media-1)
- Leonard Davis, Texas (Coaches-2)
- Curtis Lowery, Texas Tech (Coaches-2)

=== Tackles ===
- Ryan Johanningmeier, Colorado (Coaches-1)
- Stockar McDougle, Oklahoma (Media-1)
- Semisi Heimuli, Texas A&M (Coaches-2)
- Jonathan Gray, Texas Tech (Coaches-2)

=== Tight ends ===
- Tracey Wistrom, Nebraska (Coaches-1; Media-1)
- Marcellus Rivers, Oklahoma State (Coaches-2)

=== Receivers ===
- Quincy Morgan, Kansas State (Coaches-1; Media-1)
- Kwame Cavil, Texas (Coaches-1; Media-1)
- Aaron Lockett, Kansas State (Coaches-2)
- Brandon Daniels, Oklahoma (Coaches-2)

== Defensive selections ==
=== Defensive linemen ===
- Darren Howard, Kansas State (Coaches-1; Media-1)
- Justin Smith, Missouri (Coaches-1; Media-1)
- Steve Warren, Nebraska (Coaches-1; Media-1)
- Casey Hampton, Texas (Coaches-1; Media-1)
- Shaun Rogers, Texas (Coaches-1)
- Aaron Humphrey, Texas (Coaches-2)
- Taurus Rucker, Texas Tech (Coaches-2)
- Justin Bannan, Colorado (Coaches-2)
- Mario Fatafehi, Kansas State (Coaches-2)
- Kris Kocurek, Texas Tech (Coaches-2)

=== Linebackers ===
- Carlos Polk, Nebraska (Coaches-1; Media-1)
- Mark Simoneau, Kansas State (Coaches-1; Media-1)
- Rocky Calmus, Oklahoma (Coaches-2; Media-1)
- Jashon Sykes, Colorado (Coaches-2; Media-1)

=== Defensive backs ===
- Mike Brown, Nebraska (Coaches-1; Media-1)
- Ralph Brown, Nebraska (Coaches-1; Media-1)
- Lamar Chapman, Kansas State (Coaches-1; Media-1)
- Carl Nesmith, Kansas (Coaches-1)
- Ben Kelly, Colorado (Media-1)
- Damen Wheeler, Colorado (Coaches-2)
- Jarrod Cooper, Kansas State (Coaches-2)
- Jason Webster, Texas A&M (Coaches-2)
- Kevin Curtis, Texas Tech (Coaches-2)

== Special teams ==
=== Kickers ===
- Jamie Rheem, Kansas State (Coaches-1; Media-1)
- Kris Stockton, Texas (Coaches-2)

=== Punters ===
- Shane Lechler, Texas A&M (Coaches-1; Media-1)
- Dan Hadenfeldt, Nebraska (Coaches-2)

=== All-purpose / Return specialists ===
- David Allen, Kansas State (Coaches-1; Media-1)
- Ben Kelly, Colorado (Coaches-1)
- Bobby Newcombe, Nebraska (Coaches-2)
- Brandon Daniels, Oklahoma (Coaches-2)

== Key ==
Bold = selected as a first-team player by both the coaches and media panel

Coaches = selected by Big 12 Conference coaches

Media = selected by a media panel

== See also ==
- 1999 College Football All-America Team
