= 1997 Fiesta Bowl =

The 1997 Fiesta Bowl may refer to:

- 1997 Fiesta Bowl (January) - January 1, 1997, game (after the 1996 season) between Penn State and Texas
- 1997 Fiesta Bowl (December) - December 31, 1997, game (after the 1997 season) between Kansas State and Syracuse
