= Wane McGarity =

American gridiron football player (born 1976)

No. 83, 89
- Positions: Wide receiver, return specialist

Personal information
- Born: September 30, 1976 (age 50); San Antonio, Texas, U.S.
- Listed height: 5 ft 8 in (1.73 m)
- Listed weight: 191 lb (87 kg)

Career information
- High school: Clark (San Antonio)
- College: Texas
- NFL draft: 1999: 4th round, 118th overall pick

Career history
- Dallas Cowboys (1999–2001); New Orleans Saints (2001); Calgary Stampeders (2002–2004); Winnipeg Blue Bombers (2005)

Awards and highlights
- First-team All-Big 12 (1998); CFL All-Star (2003)

Career NFL statistics
- Games played: 31
- Receptions: 39
- Receiving yards: 363
- Touchdowns: 4
- Stats at Pro Football Reference
- Stats at CFL.ca (archive)

Wane Keith McGarity (born September 30, 1976) is an American former professional football player who was a wide receiver and return specialist in the National Football League (NFL) and Canadian Football League (CFL) for the Dallas Cowboys, New Orleans Saints, Calgary Stampeders and Winnipeg Blue Bombers. He played college football for the Texas Longhorns and was selected by the Dallas Cowboys in the fourth round of the 1999 NFL draft.

== Early life ==
McGarity attended Tom C. Clark High School. As a junior, he was the starter at running back, registering 890 rushing yards before suffering a torn anterior cruciate ligament in his right knee. As a senior, he rushed for 1,606 yards and 22 touchdowns on 233 carries.

He was a three-time district champion in the 100 metres, qualifying twice for the state finals.

== College career ==
McGarity accepted a football scholarship from the University of Texas. In 1994, he was declared a medical redshirt, after tearing the anterior cruciate ligament in his right knee.

As a freshman, he appeared in every game as a backup running back. As a sophomore, he was converted into a wide receiver, posting 18 receptions for 318 yards (17.7 average) and 4 touchdowns.

As a junior, he tore the anterior cruciate ligament in his left knee, during the third game of the season against Rice University. He opened the year by tallying 5 receptions for 105 yards against Rutgers University. He finished with 10 receptions for 169 yards and one touchdown.

McGarity blossomed as a fifth-year senior, compiling 58 receptions (school record) for 1,087 yards (school record) with an 18.7 average (school record) and 9 receiving touchdowns (second in school history), including making the longest reception (97 yards) in school history against the University of Oklahoma. He recorded the most touchdown receptions in one game in school history, having 4 against Texas Tech.

He totaled 95 receptions (sixth in school history), 1,687 receiving yards (third in school history), 14 touchdowns (third in school history) and most 100-yard receiving games in one season (7 in 1998).

== Professional career ==
=== Dallas Cowboys ===
McGarity was selected by the Dallas Cowboys in the fourth round (118th pick overall) of the 1999 NFL draft. As a rookie, he appeared only in 5 games because of injuries and being declared inactive. Following Michael Irvin's career-ending neck injury against the Philadelphia Eagles, McGarity had his first professional receptions in the fifth game against the New York Giants, making 3 catches for 36 yards, before dislocating his right shoulder. He would miss the next 4 contests. He made his first career start in the twelfth game against the New England Patriots in place of an injured Ernie Mills, making him the first rookie to start at wide receiver for the Cowboys since Kevin Williams in 1993. McGarity had 3 receptions for 31 yards against the Patriots. He fractured his right ring finger in practice and was placed on the injured reserve list on December 10, missing the last 4 games.

In 2000, he was the NFC's third (eighth in the NFL) leading punt returner with an 11.8-yard average. He was one of only 2 players in the league to return 2 punts for touchdowns in the season, becoming the fifth player in team history to accomplish that feat. He became the third player in NFL history to return a punt for a touchdown against the same opponent in different games during the same season. He also played as a slot wide receiver, tying for fourth on the team with 25 receptions for 250 yards. McGarity showed flashes of his big play ability, scoring on a reverse of 22 yards and on punt returns of 59 and 64 yards, with both of his scores on returns coming against the Arizona Cardinals in separate games. After Raghib Ismail sustained a torn right ACL in the overtime loss against the Philadelphia Eagles in the ninth game, McGarity was forced to see extended time at wide receiver, making 3 receptions for 19 yards, including a third down catch in overtime to convert a first down, while averaging 12.3 yards on three punt returns. In the win against the Cincinnati Bengals, he was second on the team with 4 receptions for 51 yards, including a career-long 25-yard catch and the first two rushing attempts of his career that produced 15 yards. Against the Baltimore Ravens, he led the team with a career-high of 6 receptions that gained 40 yards. The next contest against the Minnesota Vikings on Thanksgiving Day, he had 5 receptions for 54 yards and 2 punts returns for 20 yards. Against the Tampa Bay Buccaneers, he led the team with a career-high 59 receiving yards on four receptions. In the fourteenth game against the Washington Redskins, he had a big influence on all of the team's 12 first half points, returning the first two punts 33 and 27 yards, to set the offense up at the opponent's 25 and 30-yard lines, while scoring his first career offensive touchdown with a 22-yard end around run to put the Cowboys ahead for good at 12-7.

In 2001, he appeared in 3 games (one start), making 6 receptions for 45 yards, one touchdown and 6 punt returns for 38 yards. McGarity was passed on the depth chart by Reggie Swinton and was waived on October 3.

=== New Orleans Saints ===
On October 24, 2001, he signed as a free agent with the New Orleans Saints. He was released on October 27. He was re-signed on October 30. After appearing in 9 games, he wasn't re-signed at the end of the season.

=== Calgary Stampeders (CFL) ===
On September 25, 2002, he was signed by the Calgary Stampeders of the Canadian Football League. He tallied 15 receptions for 205 yards and 2 touchdowns in five games. He also had 9 kickoff returns for 212 yards and 12 punt returns for 66 yards.

In 2003, he was the West Division's top special teams player and was named to the CFL All-Star team. He finished with 55 receptions for 799 yards and 6 touchdowns. He had 663 yards and two touchdowns on punt returns and 248 yards and one touchdown on a missed field goal. He also tallied 399 kickoff return yards.

In 2004, he collected 47 receptions for 599 yards, 3 receiving touchdowns, 41 punts for 360 yards and 27 kickoffs for 583 yards in 15 games. He wasn't re-signed after the season.

=== Winnipeg Blue Bombers (CFL) ===
On February 17, 2005, he signed as a free agent with the Winnipeg Blue Bombers. He was released on August 3, after playing in 6 games.

== Personal life ==
McGarity worked at H-E-B as a health and wellness program manager. He also has two daughters Danica and DaMia and is married to Jessica McGarity.
