= Joe Kristosik =

American football punter (born c. 1974)

Profile
- Position: Punter

Career information
- High school: Bishop Gorman High School
- College: University of Nevada, Las Vegas

Career history
- 1995–1998: UNLV Rebels

Awards and highlights
- Consensus All-American (1998)

Joe Kristosik (born c. 1974) is an American former football player. After graduating from Bishop Gorman High School in Summerlin, Nevada, he entered the working world as a door-to-door salesman and a valet before enrolling at the University of Nevada, Las Vegas. He was a walk-on to the UNLV Rebels football team and, after a redshirt season in 1994, he became the starting punter for the Rebels from 1995 to 1998. As a senior, he led the NCAA with an average of 46.2 yards on 76 punts. His average of 46.2 yards per punt was, at the time, the second-highest in NCAA history for a punter with at least 75 career attempts. Kristosik was a consensus first-team selection for the 1998 College Football All-America Team. He was inducted into the UNLV Athletic Hall of Fame in 2008.
