= Rob Riti =

American football player (born 1976)

No. 76
- Position: Center

Personal information
- Born: December 2, 1976 (age 49); St. Louis, Missouri, U.S.
- Listed height: 6 ft 2 in (1.88 m)
- Listed weight: 289 lb (131 kg)

Career information
- High school: Hazelwood (MO) West
- College: Missouri
- NFL draft: 2000: undrafted

Career history
- St. Louis Rams (2000)*
- * Offseason or practice squad member only

Awards and highlights
- Consensus All-American (1999); 2× First-team All-Big 12 (1998, 1999)

Robert Marino Riti (born December 2, 1976) is an American former college football center who played at the University of Missouri. He was a consensus All-American in 1999.

== Early life ==
Riti participated in football, wrestling and track and field at Hazelwood West High School in Hazelwood, Missouri, lettering in all three sports.. He was a two time All-Suburban North Conference selection and was selected to the All-Metro team. He was recruited by Stanford University, Michigan State University, Air Force and Army. Riti was inducted in Hazelwood West High School's Hall of Fame in 2013.

== College career ==
Riti played college football for the Missouri Tigers. He was redshirted his freshman year of 1995 and played on the defensive line. He was moved to the offensive line in 1996, starting eight games at right guard and one at left guard. Riti transitioned to center in 1997, starting in all of Missouri's games. He was an All-Big 12 selection in 1998 and 1999. He was also consensus first-team All-American in 1999. Riti also squatted 1,000 pounds as a Missouri Tiger.

== Professional career ==
Riti was signed by the St. Louis Rams in April 2000 after going undrafted in the 2000 NFL draft. He was released by the Rams in August 2000.
