= Jeff Kelly (linebacker) =

American gridiron football player (born 1975)

No. 51
- Position: Linebacker

Personal information
- Born: December 13, 1975 (age 50); La Grange, Texas, U.S.
- Listed height: 6 ft 3 in (1.91 m)
- Listed weight: 242 lb (110 kg)

Career information
- High school: La Grange
- College: Kansas State
- NFL draft: 1999: 6th round, 198th overall pick

Career history
- Atlanta Falcons (1999–2002); Toronto Argonauts (2006)

Awards and highlights
- Consensus All-American (1998); 2× First-team All-Big 12 (1997, 1998); Big 12 Defensive Newcomer of the Year (1997)
- Stats at Pro Football Reference
- Stats at CFL.ca (archive)

Jeff Mitchell Kelly III (born December 13, 1975) is an American former professional football player who was a linebacker in the National Football League (NFL) and Canadian Football League (CFL). He played college football for the Kansas State Wildcats. He was selected by the Atlanta Falcons in the sixth round of the 1999 NFL draft.

He currently coaches at Fort Scott Community College.
