= Ben Kelly (gridiron football) =

American gridiron football player (born 1978)

No. 20, 31
- Position: Cornerback

Personal information
- Born: September 15, 1978 (age 48); Cleveland, Ohio, U.S.

Career information
- High school: Mentor (OH) Lake Catholic
- College: Colorado
- NFL draft: 2000: 3rd round, 84th overall pick

Career history
- Miami Dolphins (2000–2001); New England Patriots (2001–2002); Denver Broncos (2003)*; Los Angeles Avengers (2004); Calgary Stampeders (2005); Grand Rapids Rampage (2006)*
- * Offseason or practice squad member only

Awards and highlights
- Super Bowl champion (XXXVI); Third-team All-American (1999); Big 12 Freshman of the Year (1997); 3× First-team All-Big 12 (1997–1999)

Career NFL statistics
- Tackles: 6
- Stats at Pro Football Reference
- Stats at CFL.ca (archive)
- Stats at ArenaFan.com

Benjamin Oliver Kelly (born September 15, 1978) is an American former professional football player who was a cornerback of the National Football League (NFL), Arena Football League (AFL) and Canadian Football League (CFL). He was selected by the Miami Dolphins in the third round of the 2000 NFL draft. He played college football for the Colorado Buffaloes.

Kelly was an All-American sprinter for the Colorado Buffaloes track and field team, running 2nd leg on their 7th-place 4 × 400 meters relay team at the 1999 NCAA Division I Indoor Track and Field Championships.

Kelly was also a member of the New England Patriots, Denver Broncos, Los Angeles Avengers, Calgary Stampeders and Grand Rapids Rampage. He earned a Super Bowl ring with the Patriots in Super Bowl XXXVI over the St. Louis Rams.

Kelly is well represented in the Aloha Bowl record books after he returned a kickoff for a TD against Oregon on Dec. 25, 1998.
