= Warrick Holdman =

American football player (born 1975)

No. 53, 57
- Position: Linebacker

Personal information
- Born: November 22, 1975 (age 50); Alief, Texas, U.S.
- Listed height: 6 ft 1 in (1.85 m)
- Listed weight: 235 lb (107 kg)

Career information
- High school: Houston (TX) Alief Elsik
- College: Texas A&M
- NFL draft: 1999: 4th round, 106th overall pick

Career history
- Chicago Bears (1999–2003); Cleveland Browns (2004); Washington Redskins (2005–2006); Denver Broncos (2007)

Awards and highlights
- First-team All-Big 12 (1998); Second-team All-Big 12 (1997)

Career NFL statistics
- Total tackles: 521
- Sacks: 5
- Forced fumbles: 7
- Fumble recoveries: 2
- Interceptions: 1
- Stats at Pro Football Reference

Warrick Donte Holdman (born November 22, 1975) is an American former professional football player who was a linebacker in the National Football League (NFL). He was originally drafted by the Chicago Bears in the fourth round of the 1999 NFL draft. He played college football for the Texas A&M Aggies.

== Early life ==
Holdman was a Super Prep All-American selection, first team Class 5A all-state and all-greater Houston first team as a senior at Alief Elsik High School in Alief. He was rated as one of the top linebackers in the nation after totaling 151 tackles and three sacks as a senior.

== College career ==
Holdman was recruited by Texas A&M University and granted medical redshirt in 1994. As a freshman, he played in nine games with one start and ended the season with 44 tackles, two sacks, two fumble recoveries and a forced fumble. In his sophomore season in 1996, he finished second on the team with 73 tackles and added 2.5 sacks, three pass defenses and a forced fumble. As a junior, Holdman started every game and finished with 81 tackles, five sacks and played in the Cotton Bowl Classic. He was named an All-America honorable mention by College Sports News as senior in 1998. Holdman was first a team all-Big 12 Conference selection. He finished with 95 tackles, eight pass break-ups, seven sacks, five forced fumbles, two fumble recoveries, and one interception. He finished career with 294 tackles, 46 for losses, 16.5 sacks and seven forced fumbles.

== Professional career ==
Holdman was selected in the 1999 NFL draft by the Chicago Bears. That year, Holdman started as nickel linebacker and on special teams before landing a starting spot on the weak side. He played in all 16 games, and had 75 tackles. He also had two sacks, two forced fumbles, one fumble recovery and 11 special teams tackles. Holdman had a superb sophomore season in 2000, in which he had 87 tackles. He also added nine tackles on special teams. In 2001, Holdman came back strong after rehabilitating his injured left knee, starting 15 of 16 games, recording a career-high 145 tackles and three forced fumbles. Unfortunately, in 2002, he started the first four games before suffering a season-ending right knee injury. In his fifth season with the Bears in 2003, he returned from a knee injury to start 13 games and totaled 79 tackles. Holdman was then traded to the Cleveland Browns in 2004, where he appeared in all 16 games, starting 14, and posted 110 tackles, a half sack and three pass breakups. He then moved to the Washington Redskins in 2005, where he played in 14 games, starting 7 of them. On April 26, 2007, he signed a one-year deal with the Broncos. On February 11, 2008, the Broncos released him.
