= Michael Bishop (gridiron football) =

American football player (born 1976)

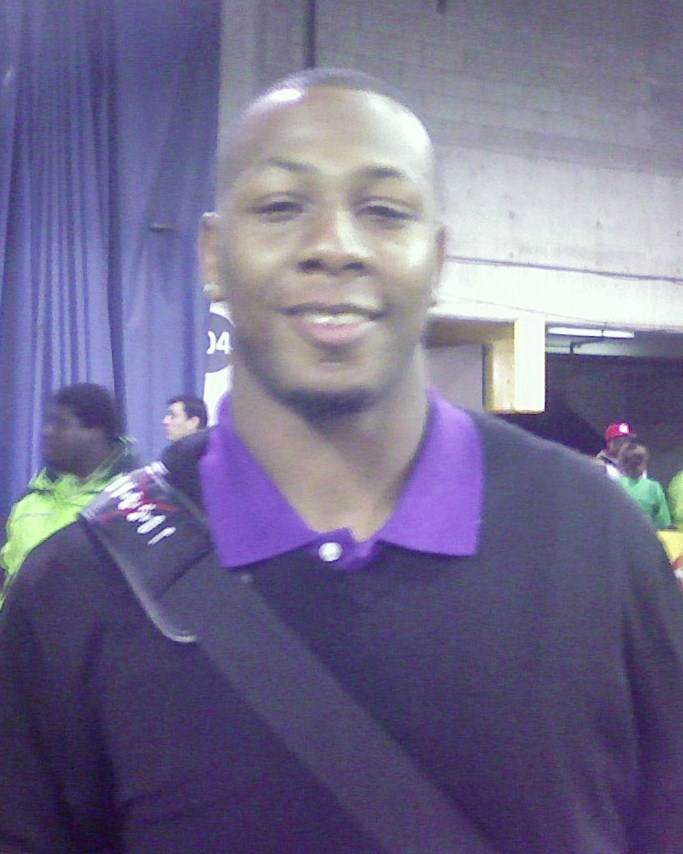
- Bishop in 2008

No. 7, 16, 17
- Position: Quarterback

Personal information
- Born: May 15, 1976 (age 50); Galveston, Texas, U.S.
- Listed height: 6 ft 1 in (1.85 m)
- Listed weight: 215 lb (98 kg)

Career information
- High school: Willis (Conroe, Texas)
- College: Kansas State
- NFL draft: 1999: 7th round, 227th overall pick

Career history
- New England Patriots (1999–2000); → Frankfurt Galaxy (2001); Green Bay Packers (2001)*; Toronto Argonauts (2002–2008); Grand Rapids Rampage (2004–2005); Chicago Rush (2006); Kansas City Brigade (2007); Grand Rapids Rampage (2007); Saskatchewan Roughriders (2008); Corpus Christi Hammerheads (2009); Texas Hurricanes (2009); Winnipeg Blue Bombers (2009–2010); Calgary Stampeders (2011); Winnipeg Blue Bombers (2011)
- * Offseason or practice squad member only

Awards and highlights
- Grey Cup champion (2004); ArenaBowl champion (2006); 2× NJCAA national champion (1995, 1996); Davey O'Brien Award (1998); Consensus All-American (1998); Big 12 Offensive Newcomer of the Year (1997); First-team All-Big 12 (1998); Second-team All-Big 12 (1997); Kansas State Athletics Hall of Fame (2016)

Career NFL statistics
- TD–INT: 1–1
- Passing yards: 80
- Passer rating: 64.4
- Stats at Pro Football Reference

Career CFL statistics
- TD–INT: 66–77
- Passing yards: 11,772
- Passer rating: 70.7
- Stats at CFL.ca (archived)
- College Football Hall of Fame

Michael Paul Bishop (born May 15, 1976) is an American former professional football player who was a quarterback in the National Football League (NFL), Canadian Football League (CFL), Arena Football League (AFL), and NFL Europe. He played college football for the Kansas State Wildcats, earning consensus All-American honors in 1998. He was selected by the New England Patriots in the seventh round of the 1999 NFL draft.

Bishop was a member of the CFL's Toronto Argonauts from 2002 to 2008. He also previously played with the NFL's New England Patriots during the 2000 season.

Bishop was one of the best college quarterbacks in the country at Kansas State, beating out UCLA's Cade McNown for the 1998 Davey O'Brien Award. Bishop was elected to the College Football Hall of Fame in 2023.

== Early life ==
Bishop was an outstanding football and baseball player at Willis High School in Willis, Texas. A two-year starter who averaged 221.2 yards-per-game passing as a senior, he was an All-Montgomery County, all-city and all-state selection in football. In baseball, he was drafted by the Cleveland Indians in the 28th round of the 1995 Major League Baseball draft.

== College career ==
=== Blinn Junior College ===
Bishop initially attended Blinn Junior College in Brenham, Texas where as a freshman, he led the Buccaneers to a 12–0 record and the NJCAA National Championship. He rushed for 387 yards including three scores and passed for 1,712 yards and 18 touchdowns. His sophomore year, he once again led Blinn to a 12–0 record and an NJCAA National Championship. He was voted honorable mention All-Conference and controlled an offense which recorded 3,086 yards rushing, including 47 touchdowns and scored a total of 438 points (36.5 avg. per game). He passed for 972 yards and nine touchdowns, and rushed for 265 yards and four scores. After his two years at Blinn, he played baseball for one season at Independence Community College in Independence, Kansas in the spring of 1997.

=== Kansas State ===
He was heavily recruited by a number of Division I programs as a defensive back, but decided upon Kansas State University, as head coach Bill Snyder was the only coach to offer Bishop the opportunity to play the quarterback position.

In 1997, his first year at Kansas State, Bishop started all 11 regular season games and completed 80-of-185 passes for 1,557 yards and 13 touchdowns. He also rushed for 556 yards and added nine rushing touchdowns. Bishop was voted second-team All-Big 12 Conference by the league's coaches and Big 12 Newcomer of the year by Associated Press. During the 1997 season, Kansas State won 11 games including a 1997 Fiesta Bowl victory over Syracuse led by Donovan McNabb by a score of 35–18. Kansas State's only loss in the 1997 season came to the eventual national champion Nebraska Cornhuskers. The loss was the first of only three in Bishop's collegiate career.

In Bishop's senior year, Kansas State was considered a contender for the 1998 National Championship. That year, he broke school season records with 2,844 yards passing and 23 touchdowns with only four interceptions, He led the team with 14 rushing touchdowns and finished second with 748 yards on 177 attempts. He passed for 440 yards and four touchdowns on 23-of-40 passes vs. Northeast Louisiana, his four touchdown passes tying a school record and his 440 passing yards ranking him second in school history. He passed for 306 yards and a pair of touchdowns and rushed 25 times for 140 yards (5.6 avg.) with two scores and was voted Big 12 Offensive Player of the Week as the Wildcats defeated Nebraska for the first time in 30 years. Bishop led the Wildcats to an undefeated regular season and the Big 12 North title, putting Kansas State in 1st place in the ESPN-USA Today Coaches poll and 2nd in the Associated Press media poll. Just two weeks later, the Wildcats' national championship dreams were put to an end. In the 1998 Big 12 Championship Game on December 5, 1998, Kansas State lost in double overtime to No. 10 Texas A&M team 36–33. Bishop ran for one touchdown in the game and threw for two more scores.

Bishop started in all 25 games (including bowl games) during his two seasons at Kansas State and posted a 22–3 (.880) record. He received 792 votes, including 41 first place votes, but finished second in the 1998 Heisman Trophy voting to Ricky Williams. He finished his Wildcat career fourth on the all-time passing list with 4,401 yards and broke Chad May's career record with 36 touchdown passes despite playing only two seasons. He ranks second behind Lynn Dickey in Kansas State history with 5,715 yards of total offense. Also established a Kansas State record with 59 total touchdowns (rushing and passing). After his senior season, he was voted a consensus All-American and All-Big 12 Conference selection and was named the Big 12 Offensive Player of the Year.

The Wildcats finished ranked third in the BCS, and lost in the Alamo Bowl to Purdue, 37–34.

== Professional career ==
Pre-draft measurables
Height	Weight	40-yard dash	10-yard split	20-yard split	20-yard shuttle	Three-cone drill	Vertical jump	Broad jump	Wonderlic
6 ft 0 3/8 in (1.84 m)	205 lb (93 kg)	4.84 s	1.67 s	2.83 s	4.62 s	7.63 s	33.0 in (0.84 m)	9 ft 5 in (2.87 m)	10
All values from NFL Combine

=== National Football League ===
Bishop was selected by the New England Patriots in the seventh round of the 1999 NFL draft with the 227th overall pick. However, he was inactive for all but one game. It was not until the 2000 season that he played in his first ever professional game. During that season, he saw only limited playing time, completing just 3-of-9 passes for 80 yards with 1 touchdown and 1 interception. During a game against the Indianapolis Colts he threw a 44-yard Hail Mary touchdown at the end of the first half in his first career attempt. Afterwards, several Patriots fans, upset with the poor play of starting quarterback Drew Bledsoe throughout the season, demanded that coach Bill Belichick name Bishop the starter, though this never happened. Tom Brady called Bishop "one of the best athletes he has ever seen" in the 2000 NFL season.

=== NFL Europe ===
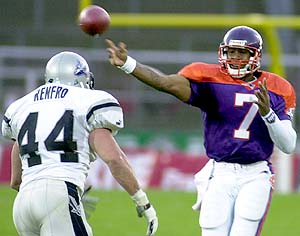
Bishop playing for the Frankfurt Galaxy.

In 2001, Bishop played in Germany for the Frankfurt Galaxy of NFL Europe. He started six games for the Galaxy, and completed 76-of-153 passes for 1,090 yards, including 11 touchdowns and 7 interceptions. He also gained 244 yards on 35 carries (7.0 avg.) and scored one rushing touchdown. Bishop was released by the Patriots in August 2001. He was then signed by the Green Bay Packers but was cut before the 2001 regular season.

=== Canadian Football League ===
In 2002, Bishop was traded from the Calgary Stampeders (who owned his CFL rights) to the Toronto Argonauts along with two 2002 late round draft picks for Michel Dupuis, a 2003 First-round CFL draft pick, and a conditional 2003 CFL draft pick. He signed with the Argonauts in April 2002 and had some brief stints as a starting quarterback with them, but was predominantly a backup. Between 2002 and 2005, he completed 206-of-446 passes for 3,192 yards, 17 touchdowns and 32 interceptions for a quarterback rating of 53.2. He also rushed for 768 yards and seven touchdowns.

In 2003, Bishop was put in with just seconds left in a playoff game against the Montreal Alouettes. Since the Argonauts were not within field goal range, he was to throw a Hail Mary pass with hopes for a miracle. While the miracle did not come true, he was seen throwing the ball approximately 70 yards down the field, thus showing he had one of the stronger arms in professional football.

With his propensity for throwing more interceptions than touchdown passes and an inclination to run with the football, Bishop's intelligence as a quarterback came into question by many CFL fans. Despite the criticism, he had a satisfactory performance while Damon Allen was injured during the 2004 season and helped the Argonauts win the 92nd Grey Cup championship that season.

On April 21, 2006, the Argonauts released Bishop only to re-acquire him four months later on August 11, more than halfway into the season. During that season, the bulk of his playing time involved being inserted into the game exclusively during short yardage situations. During the 2006 East Division semi-final, however, he came in to replace Allen late in the fourth quarter and threw two touchdown passes to Arland Bruce III and R. Jay Soward, sending the Argonauts to the East Division Final.

In the 2006 Eastern Final against the Alouettes, Bishop again found himself replacing Damon Allen in the third quarter. Down 23–3, Bishop threw touchdown passes to Arland Bruce III and Michael Palmer, and was able to guide the Argonauts to within a touchdown of a comeback, however they fell short, losing 33–24.

Bishop had been playing in both the CFL and the Arena Football League (AFL) since 2004 and during the offseason, it was learned that the AFL's schedule had been shifted later into the year, thereby creating an overlap of the AFL's post-season with the CFL's training camp period. With Bishop signed to an AFL team, there were concerns throughout the CFL's offseason about whether or not he would report to the Argonauts' 2007 training camp. However, on May 14, 2007, he returned to Toronto and participated in an informal workout with some of his Argonauts teammates at the University of Toronto Mississauga after being placed on the exempt list by his AFL team, the Grand Rapids Rampage for the purpose of leaving the team.

Bishop backed up Damon Allen in the Argonaut's Week 1 loss to the BC Lions and came into the game in the fourth quarter throwing a touchdown to Michael Palmer and having another touchdown to Andre Talbot called back due to a penalty. Bishop's performance and Allen's struggles led to Bishop being named the Week Two starter against the Hamilton Tiger-Cats on July 7, 2007 marking his first start since November 2005. He threw three touchdown passes to help lead the Argonauts to a 30–5 win over the Tiger-Cats. In a July 12, 2007 game against the Calgary Stampeders, while enjoying a second straight solid start, Bishop fractured his distal radius while being tackled on a run to the Stampeders' one-yard line and was scheduled to miss 6–8 weeks of the season.

The Argonauts went 0–6 with Bishop out of the lineup; however after his return, the Argonauts went 9–1 and finished in first place in the CFL's Eastern Division. He finished the 2007 regular season with 2,920 passing yards, 22 touchdowns and 11 interceptions.

Bishop helped lead the Argonauts into the 2007 CFL Eastern Division final where they were defeated 19–9 by the Winnipeg Blue Bombers. He completed under 50% of his passes and while throwing for over 300 yards, he also failed to connect on multiple passes in crunch time. He went 11–1 as a starter in the regular season.

Before the start of the 2008 season, The Argonauts acquired the reigning CFL Most Outstanding Player, Kerry Joseph, from the Saskatchewan Roughriders. This was a surprise considering Bishop's record as a starter the previous season. Despite the perceived quarterback controversy, the Argonauts started the season with both quarterbacks. While Bishop did get some playing time, Joseph played the majority of the games.

On August 23, 2008, Bishop was traded to the Saskatchewan Roughriders for a conditional draft pick. He was immediately named the starter and won his first game for the team, against the Blue Bombers. He also won his second game with a fourth quarter rally, where the Roughriders scored 20 unanswered points to defeat the Blue Bombers. Bishop was named the CFL's Offensive Player of the Week for his performance in the Winnipeg comeback. In the 2008 West Semifinal game against the BC Lions, he threw three interceptions and fumbled twice.

On November 10, 2008, it was reported in the Regina Leader Post that the Roughriders had placed Bishop on waivers, leaving to doubt about his future in Saskatchewan. Roughriders head coach Ken Miller confirmed that he and General Manager Eric Tillman had met on November 9 and agreed to release Bishop. Miller himself informed Bishop of the decision the next evening.

On July 26, 2009, Bishop made his return to the Canadian Football League after signing with the Winnipeg Blue Bombers. In his first game back in the CFL as a starting quarterback, he led the Blue Bombers to a 13–12 victory, completing 16 of 30 pass attempts for 213 yards with 1 touchdown and 1 interception.

On February 23, 2010, Bishop was released by the Blue Bombers due to poor play throughout the year

After second-string quarterback Drew Tate was injured in a preseason game, the Calgary Stampeders signed Bishop as a backup for incumbent starter Henry Burris. Bishop was officially signed on June 29, 2011. Once Tate was healthy enough to return, Bishop was released after five games on August 3, 2011.

On September 27, 2011, Bishop was signed by the Blue Bombers because of many injuries in the QB position. He was shortly after released.

=== Arena Football League ===
From 2004 to 2007, Bishop played in both the CFL and the Arena Football League. In his first AFL season in 2004, Bishop seldom saw any playing time with the Grand Rapids Rampage, playing in only five games. In 2005, he started in 15 games for the Rampage and led the league in rushing yards, rushing attempts, yards-per-rush, and rushing touchdowns. He also set a record for most rushing yards in a single game on February 5, 2005, against the Colorado Crush by becoming the first player to ever rush for 100 yards in an AFL game. In addition to this record, he also holds the AFL record for most rushing yards in a season with 459. Because of his rushing statistics as a quarterback combined with his strong arm, comparisons between him and NFL quarterback Michael Vick were made. Some fans and sports writers have labeled him the "Michael Vick of the AFL".

In 2006, Bishop signed with the Chicago Rush. Despite the buzz he created in 2005, he was relegated to sharing the backup quarterback role behind Matt D'Orazio with Asad Abdul-Khaliq. Bishop received very little playing time upon joining the Rush in 2006, though some of that was a result of a leave of absence he took from the team due to the passing of his mother. The Rush went on to win ArenaBowl XX that season.

On October 31, 2006, Bishop signed with the Kansas City Brigade. However, on March 13, 2007, he was traded to the Rampage, marking his second stint with the team since 2005. On May 15, 2007, he was placed on the Rampage's reserve list under the "left squad" category. This move was done to clear the way for his return to the Canadian Football League.

=== Indoor Football League ===
Bishop played for the Corpus Christi Hammerheads and was their starting quarterback in 2009. The Hammerheads went 1–3 with Bishop under center losing to the El Paso Generals and once to the Abilene Ruff Riders.

=== Southern Indoor Football League ===
Bishop signed with the Texas Hurricanes in the Southern Indoor Football League in June 2009 and served as their starting quarterback. The Hurricanes went 0–3 with Bishop under center and 0–4 when he was on the roster, losing to the Louisiana Swashbucklers, Houma Conquerors, and Austin Turfcats.

== Career statistics ==
=== Professional ===
Year	Team	GP	Passing							Rushing				
Year	Team	GP	Att	Cmp	Pct	Yds	TD	Int	Rtg	Att	Yds	Avg	Lng	TD
2000	NE	8	9	3	33.3	80	1	1	64.4	7	-1	-0.1	2	0
2001	FRA	10	153	76	49.7	1,090	11	7	78.1	35	244	7.0	22	1
2002	TOR	14	148	63	42.6	1,053	7	10	54.8	45	225	5.0	24	2
2003	TOR	18	20	8	40.0	215	1	2	55.2	3	33	11.0	14	0
2004	TOR	18	217	104	47.9	1,508	6	15	51.4	60	408	6.8	38	5
2005	TOR	18	61	31	50.8	416	3	4	61.9	13	102	7.8	21	0
2006	TOR	11	12	5	41.7	75	2	1	83.7	21	31	1.5	3	1
2007	TOR	13	355	185	52.1	2,920	22	11	87.5	38	260	6.8	20	0
2008	SSK	10	232	141	60.8	2,224	7	12	81.2	41	202	4.9	20	4
2008	TOR	8	42	19	45.2	326	3	1	86.0	5	42	8.4	—	0
2009	WPG	14	405	204	50.4	3,035	15	20	67.1	19	84	4.4	—	0
NFL totals		8	9	3	33.3	80	1	1	64.4	7	-1	-0.1	2	0
NFLE totals		10	153	76	49.7	1,090	11	7	78.1	35	244	7.0	22	1
CFL totals		125	1,492	760	50.9	11,772	66	77	70.7	275	1,387	5.0	38	12

=== College ===
Season	Team	Passing							Rushing			
Season	Team	Cmp	Att	Pct	Yds	Y/A	TD	Int	Att	Yds	Avg	TD
1997	Kansas State	80	185	43.2	1,557	8.4	13	8	147	566	3.9	9
1998	Kansas State	164	295	55.6	2,844	9.6	23	4	177	748	4.2	14
Career		244	480	50.8	4,401	9.2	36	12	324	1,314	4.1	23

== Personal life ==
Bishop's cousin, Jermaine Bishop Jr., plays college football for the Texas Longhorns.

== See also ==
- List of Arena Football League and National Football League players
