= De'Mond Parker =

American football player (born 1976)

No. 22
- Position: Running back

Personal information
- Born: December 24, 1976 (age 49); Tulsa, Oklahoma, U.S.
- Listed height: 5 ft 9 in (1.75 m)
- Listed weight: 189 lb (86 kg)

Career information
- College: Oklahoma
- NFL draft: 1999: 5th round, 159th overall pick

Career history
- 1999–2000: Green Bay Packers
- 2001: Detroit Lions
- 2003: Buffalo Bills*
- * Offseason or practice squad member only

Awards and highlights
- Big 12 Offensive Freshman of the Year (1996); 3× Second-team All-Big 12 (1996, 1997, 1998, Media)
- Stats at Pro Football Reference

De'Mond Keith Parker (born December 24, 1976) is an American former football running back for the Oklahoma Sooners and the National Football League (NFL).

== Career ==
Parker was a standout for the Booker T. Washington Hornets in Tulsa. As a true freshman at Oklahoma, Parker gained over 1,000 yards. He accomplished that feat in each of his three seasons. All three of his seasons rank in the top 20 all-time at Oklahoma.

Parker racked up 291 yards in the 1997 Red River Shootout. Outrushing eventual Heisman Trophy winner Ricky Williams, Parker established the record for the most yards in a single OU-Texas game.

Parker played for the Sooners from 1996 to 1998, and is the Sooners' eighth all-time leading rusher.

When Bob Stoops became the third head coach in Parker's tenure at Oklahoma in 1999, Parker decided to forgo his senior season, despite several attempts by Stoops to keep him with the team. He was taken by the Green Bay Packers with the 159th overall pick in the fifth round of the 1999 NFL draft. In his only NFL start in 1999, Parker rushed for 135 yards and two touchdowns. He later joined the Detroit Lions, but did not play.

=== College statistics ===
Season	Yards	Att	TD	Y/A	100Y	200Y
1996	1,184	180	10	6.58	6	1
1997	1,143	194	6	5.89	--	2
1998	1,076	205	5	5.25	6	2
Career	3,403	579	21	5.88	16	5
