= Jay Foreman (American football) =

American football player (born 1976)

No. 55, 56, 96, 51
- Position: Linebacker

Personal information
- Born: February 18, 1976 (age 50); Eden Prairie, Minnesota, U.S.
- Listed height: 6 ft 1 in (1.85 m)
- Listed weight: 240 lb (109 kg)

Career information
- High school: Eden Prairie
- College: Nebraska
- NFL draft: 1999: 5th round, 156th overall pick

Career history
- Buffalo Bills (1999–2001); Houston Texans (2002–2004); New York Giants (2005); San Francisco 49ers (2006)

Awards and highlights
- 3× National champion (1994, 1995, 1997); 2× Second-team All-Big 12 (1997, 1998)

Career NFL statistics
- Tackles: 527
- Sacks: 4.5
- Forced fumbles: 4
- Fumble recoveries: 5
- Pass deflections: 14
- Stats at Pro Football Reference

Jamal Antoine Foreman (born February 18, 1976) is an American former professional football player who was a linebacker in the National Football League (NFL) with the Buffalo Bills, the Houston Texans, and the New York Giants. He played college football for the Nebraska Cornhuskers and was selected in the fifth round of the 1999 NFL draft. After retiring, he started a business called Foreman Fitness. He is the son of Minnesota Vikings running back Chuck Foreman.

== Early life ==
Foreman originally started playing high school football at Eden Prairie High School, but transferred to Minnetonka High School and then transferred back to Eden Prairie.

He also earned an MBA from Harvard Business School.

== Career statistics ==
Legend
**Bold**	Career high

=== NFL ===
==== Regular season ====
Year	Team	Games		Tackles						Interceptions						Fumbles				
Year	Team	GP	GS	Cmb	Solo	Ast	Sck	TFL	Sfty	PD	Int	Yds	Avg	Lng	TD	FF	FR	Yds	Avg	TD
1999	BUF	7	0	2	2	0	0.0	0	0	0	0	0	0.0	0	0	0	0	0	0.0	0
2000	BUF	15	3	64	44	20	0.0	0	0	0	0	0	0.0	0	0	**1**	0	0	0.0	0
2001	BUF	16	16	102	73	29	**2.5**	**8**	0	0	0	0	0.0	0	0	**1**	**2**	0	0.0	0
2002	HOU	16	16	**143**	**107**	**36**	0.0	**8**	0	**8**	0	0	0.0	0	0	**1**	0	0	0.0	0
2003	HOU	16	16	136	101	35	2.0	4	0	5	0	0	0.0	0	0	**1**	**2**	**33**	**16.5**	0
2004	HOU	11	11	79	53	26	0.0	2	0	1	0	0	0.0	0	0	0	1	3	3.0	0
2005	NYG	1	0	1	1	0	0.0	0	0	0	0	0	0.0	0	0	0	0	0	0.0	0
2006	SF	2	0	0	0	0	0.0	0	0	0	0	0	0.0	0	0	0	0	0	0.0	0
Career		84	62	527	381	146	4.5	22	0	14	0	0	0.0	0	0	4	5	36	7.2	0

==== Postseason ====
Year	Team	Games		Tackles						Interceptions						Fumbles				
Year	Team	GP	GS	Cmb	Solo	Ast	Sck	TFL	Sfty	PD	Int	Yds	Avg	Lng	TD	FF	FR	Yds	Avg	TD
1999	BUF	0	0	DNP																
2005	NYG	1	0	**2**	**1**	**1**	0.0	0	0	0	0	0	0.0	0	0	0	0	0	0.0	0
Career		1	0	2	1	1	0.0	0	0	0	0	0	0.0	0	0	0	0	0	0.0	0

=== College ===
Year	School	Conf	Tackles						Interceptions					
Year	School	Conf	G	GS	Solo	Ast	Tot	Tfl	Sacks	Sacks-Yards	Int	PD	FF	FR
1995	Nebraska	B8	12	11	11	24	35	2	0	0	0	0	0	
1996	Nebraska	B12	13	0	12	34	46	1	0.5	0.5-2	**2**	1	**1**	0
1997	Nebraska	B12	13	13	21	46	66	5	1.5	1.5-6	0	1	0	0
1998	Nebraska	B12	13	13	**32**	**65**	**103**	7	**3.0**	**3-22**	0	**4**	**1**	**1**

Notes - Statistics include bowl game performances.
