= 1997 All-Big 12 Conference football team =

The 1997 All-Big 12 Conference football team consists of American football players chosen as All-Big 12 Conference players for the 1997 NCAA Division I-A football season. The conference recognizes two official All-Big 12 selectors: (1) the Big 12 conference coaches selected separate offensive and defensive units and named first-, second- and third-team players (the "Coaches" team); and (2) a panel of sports writers and broadcasters covering the Big 12 also selected offensive and defensive units and named first- and second-team players (the "Media" team).

== Offensive selections ==
=== Quarterbacks ===
- Corby Jones, Missouri (Coaches-1; Media-1)
- Michael Bishop, Kansas State (Coaches-2)
- Scott Frost, Nebraska (Media-2)

=== Running backs ===
- Ahman Green, Nebraska (Coaches-1; Media-1)
- Ricky Williams, Texas (Coaches-1; Media-1)
- De'Mond Parker, Oklahoma (Coaches-2; Media-1)
- Brock Olivo, Missouri (Coaches-2; Media-2)
- Darren Davis, Iowa State (Media-2)
- Dante Hall, Texas A&M (Media-2)

=== Offensive line ===
- Todd Weiner, Kansas State (Coaches-1; Media-1)
- Mike Morris, Missouri (Coaches-1; Media-1)
- Aaron Taylor, Nebraska (Coaches-1; Media-1)
- Eric Anderson, Nebraska (Coaches-1; Media-1)
- Kendyl Jacox, Kansas State (Coaches-1; Media-2)
- Steve McKinney, Texas A&M (Coaches-2; Media-1)
- Travis Biebel, Missouri (Coaches-2; Media-2)
- Josh Henson, Oklahoma State (Coaches-2; Media-2)
- Jay Pugh, Texas Tech (Coaches-2; Media-2)
- Melvin Thomas, Colorado (Coaches-2; Media-2)

=== Tight ends ===
- Alonzo Mayes, Oklahoma State (Coaches-1; Media-1)
- Stephen Alexander, Oklahoma (Coaches-2)
- Derrick Spiller, Texas A&M (Media-2)

=== Receivers ===
- Tyrone Watley, Iowa State (Coaches-1; Media-1)
- Phil Savoy, Colorado (Coaches-1; Media-2)
- Donnie Hart, Texas Tech (Coaches-2)
- Ed Williams, Iowa State (Coaches-2)

== Defensive selections ==
=== Defensive linemen ===
- Grant Wistrom, Nebraska (Coaches-1; Media-1)
- Montae Reagor, Texas Tech (Coaches-1; Media-1)
- Jason Peter, Nebraska (Coaches-1; Media-1)
- Darren Howard, Kansas State (Coaches-2; Media-2)
- Ryan Olson, Colorado (Coaches-1; Media-2)
- Martin Chase, Oklahoma (Media-2)
- Jamal Williams, Oklahoma State (Coaches-1)
- Marquis Gibson, Missouri (Coaches-2)
- Jerome Evans, Kansas State (Coaches-2)
- Kelly Gregg, Oklahoma (Coaches-2)
- Cody McGuire, Texas Tech (Coaches-2)

=== Linebackers ===
- Ron Warner, Kansas (Coaches-1; Media-1)
- Jeff Kelly, Kansas State (Coaches-1; Media-1)
- Dat Nguyen, Texas A&M (Coaches-1; Media-1)
- Mark Simoneau Kansas State (Coaches-2; Media-1)
- Travis Ochs, Kansas State (Media-2)
- Warrick Holdman, Texas A&M (Media-2)
- Jay Foreman, Nebraska (Media-2)
- Hannibal Navies, Colorado (Media-2)
- Kenyatta Wright, Oklahoma State (Coaches-2)

=== Defensive backs ===
- Ralph Brown, Nebraska (Coaches-1; Media-1)
- Kevin Williams, Oklahoma State (Coaches-1; Media-1)
- R. W. McQuarters, Oklahoma Stale (Coaches-1; Media-1)
- Ryan Sutter, Colorado (Coaches-2; Media-1)
- Tony Blevins, Kansas (Coaches-2; Media-2)
- Dane Johnson, Texas Tech (Coaches-1; Media-2)
- Harold Piersey, Missouri (Media-2)
- Tony Darden, Texas Tech (Media-2)
- Lamar Chapman, Kansas State (Coaches-2)
- Mike Brown, Nebraska (Coaches-2)

== Special teams ==
=== Kickers ===
- Martín Gramática, Kansas State (Coaches-1; Media-1)
- Phil Dawson, Texas (Coaches-2)
- Kyle Bryant, Texas A&M (Media-2)

=== Punters ===
- Shane Lechler, Texas A&M (Coaches-1; Media-1)
- Jason Davis, Oklahoma State (Media-2)
- Dean Royal, Kansas (Coaches-2)

=== Return specialists ===
- Ben Kelly, Colorado (Coaches-1; Media-1)
- R. W. McQuarters, Oklahoma State (Coaches-1; Media-2)
- Dante Hall, Texas A&M (Coaches-2)
- David Allen, Kansas State (Coaches-2)

== Key ==
Bold = selected as a first-team player by both the coaches and media panel

Coaches = selected by Big 12 Conference coaches

Media = selected by a media panel

== See also ==
- 1997 College Football All-America Team
