= Montae Reagor =

American football player (born 1977)

No. 99, 90, 94
- Position: Defensive tackle

Personal information
- Born: June 29, 1977 (age 49); Waxahachie, Texas, U.S.
- Listed height: 6 ft 3 in (1.91 m)
- Listed weight: 285 lb (129 kg)

Career information
- High school: Waxahachie
- College: Texas Tech (1995–1998)
- NFL draft: 1999: 2nd round, 58th overall pick

Career history
- Denver Broncos (1999–2002); Indianapolis Colts (2003–2006); Philadelphia Eagles (2007)

Awards and highlights
- Super Bowl champion (XLI); Consensus All-American (1998); 2× First-team All-Big 12 (1997, 1998)

Career NFL statistics
- Total tackles: 173
- Sacks: 17
- Forced fumbles: 4
- Fumble recoveries: 7
- Interceptions: 1
- Defensive touchdowns: 1
- Stats at Pro Football Reference

Willie Montae Reagor (/mɒnˈteɪ ˈreɪɡər/; born June 29, 1977) is an American former professional football player who was a defensive tackle for nine seasons in the National Football League (NFL). He played college football for the Texas Tech Red Raiders, where he was recognized as a consensus All-American. He was selected by the Denver Broncos in the second round of the 1999 NFL draft, and also played for the Indianapolis Colts (with whom he won Super Bowl XLI) and Philadelphia Eagles. Reagor was a coaching intern for the Eagles in 2011.

He sold his Super Bowl XLI ring on Pawn Stars.

== Early life ==
Reagor was born in Waxahachie, Texas. He attended Waxahachie High School, and was a standout high school football player for the Waxahachie Indians.

== College career ==
Reagor attended Texas Tech University, and was a four-year starter for the Red Raiders. He started in 41 of 44 career games, and holds the Red Raiders' team record with 24.5 sacks and 47 tackles for loss. As a senior in 1998, he had 96 tackles, seven sacks and 19 tackles for losses, which earned him consensus first-team All-America and first-team All-Big 12 first-team honors.

== Professional career ==
Pre-draft measurables
Height	Weight	Arm length	Hand span	40-yard dash	10-yard split	20-yard split	20-yard shuttle	Three-cone drill	Vertical jump	Broad jump	Bench press
6 ft 1 1/2 in (1.87 m)	263 lb (119 kg)	32 7/8 in (0.84 m)	9 5/8 in (0.24 m)	4.83 s	1.67 s	2.79 s	4.23 s	7.36 s	34.5 in (0.88 m)	8 ft 11 in (2.72 m)	20 reps
All values from NFL Combine

=== Denver Broncos ===
Reagor was drafted by the Denver Broncos in the second round of the 1999 NFL draft. He spent four seasons with the Broncos, from 1999 to 2002.

=== Indianapolis Colts ===
Reagor signed with the Indianapolis Colts in 2003, and remained a Colt through the 2006 season.

==== Automobile accident ====
On October 22, 2006, Reagor was involved in an automobile accident on his way to that Sunday's game against the Washington Redskins. Reagor suffered a broken orbital bone and received 35 stitches in the back of his head. Reagor was later placed on the injured reserve list by the Colts and missed the duration of the season. Reagor still has severe facial damage. After the Colts won Super Bowl XLI, the team terminated his contract on March 1, 2007, due to the severity of his injury.

=== Philadelphia Eagles ===
On March 20, 2007, he signed a deal with the Philadelphia Eagles. His signing allowed the Eagles to trade defensive tackle Darwin Walker and a conditional draft pick in 2008 to the Buffalo Bills for linebacker Takeo Spikes and quarterback Kelly Holcomb. Reagor was expected to help Philadelphia's revamped Defensive line. Due to his successful play and return from his severe injuries, Reagor was named as the Philadelphia Eagles recipient for the 2007 Ed Block Courage Award. He was released in the 2008 offseason.

== Coaching career ==
Reagor became a coaching intern for the Eagles during training camp in 2011.

== Personal life ==
His son, Jalen Reagor, was a first-round pick (26th overall) for the Philadelphia Eagles in the 2020 NFL draft. He currently plays as a wide receiver for the Los Angeles Chargers.
