= Lamar Chapman =

American football player (born 1976)

No. 27, 40
- Position: Cornerback

Personal information
- Born: November 6, 1976 (age 50); Liberal, Kansas, U.S.
- Listed height: 6 ft 0 in (1.83 m)
- Listed weight: 186 lb (84 kg)

Career information
- High school: Liberal
- College: Kansas State (1995–1999)
- NFL draft: 2000: 5th round, 146th overall pick

Career history
- Cleveland Browns (2000–2002); Montreal Alouettes (2005)

Awards and highlights
- 2× First-team All-Big 12 (1998, 1999); Second-team All-Big 12 (1997)

Career NFL statistics
- Games played: 8
- Tackles: 18
- Interceptions: 1
- Stats at Pro Football Reference

Lamar A. Chapman (born November 6, 1976) is an American former professional football player who was a cornerback for two seasons with the Cleveland Browns of the National Football League (NFL). He was selected by the Browns in the fifth round of the 2000 NFL draft after playing college football for the Kansas State Wildcats. He was also a member of the Montreal Alouettes of the Canadian Football League (CFL).

== Early life ==
Lamar A. Chapman was born on November 6, 1976, in Liberal, Kansas. He attended Liberal High School in Liberal.

== College career ==
Chapman played college football for the Wildcats of Kansas State University from 1995 to 1999. He was redshirted in 1995 and was a four-year letterman from 1996 to 1999. He recorded one interception his redshirt freshman year in 1996. Champan returned 10 punts for 138 yards and one touchdown in 1997 and earned Coaches second-team All-Big 12 Conference honors. During the 1998 season, he totaled one interception, five punt returns for 78 yards, and one kick return for 27 yards while earning Coaches first-team All-Big 12 and Media second-team All-Big 12 recognition. As a senior in 1999, he returned five interceptions for 117 yards and one touchdown, ten punts for 61 yards, and three kicks for 52 yards, earning Coaches and Media first-team All-Big 12 honors.

== Professional career ==
Chapman was selected by the Cleveland Browns in the fifth round, with the 146th overall pick, of the 2000 NFL draft. He officially signed with the team on June 16. He played in seven games for the Browns during the 2000 season, recording 16 solo tackles, one interception, and two pass breakups. Chapman appeared in one game in 2001, posting two solo tackles, before being placed on injured reserve on September 19, 2001. He was placed on injured reserve again on August 5, 2002, and became a free agent after the 2002 season.

Chapman dressed in four games for the Montreal Alouettes of the Canadian Football League in 2005, totaling 12 defensive tackles, two interceptions, and one pass breakup.
