= David Allen (American football) =

American gridiron football player (born 1978)

No. 34, 32
- Position: Running back

Personal information
- Born: February 9, 1978 (age 48); Euless, Texas, U.S.

Career information
- High school: Liberty (Liberty, Missouri)
- College: Kansas State
- NFL draft: 2000: undrafted

Career history
- San Francisco 49ers (2001)*; Minnesota Vikings (2002)*; Jacksonville Jaguars (2002–2004); → Berlin Thunder (2003); St. Louis Rams (2005); Calgary Stampeders (2005–2006)
- * Offseason or practice squad member only

Awards and highlights
- Consensus All-American (1998); First-team All-American (1999); 2× First-team All-Big 12 (1998, 1999); Second-team All-Big 12 (1997)
- Stats at Pro Football Reference

David Allen (born February 9, 1978) is an American former professional football player who was a running back in the National Football League (NFL) and Canadian Football League (CFL). He played college football for the Kansas State Wildcats, earning consensus All-American honors in 1998. He three seasons in the NFL with the Jacksonville Jaguars and St. Louis Rams. He was originally signed as an undrafted free agent by the Jaguars, and spent one season with the Rams. He played two seasons in the CFL with the Calgary Stampeders.

== Early life ==
He was born in Euless, Texas and attended Liberty High School in Liberty, Missouri.

== College career ==
Allen attended Kansas State University, and played for the Kansas State Wildcats football team from 1996 to 1999. He was recognized as a consensus first-team All-American as an all-purpose athlete and kick returner in 1998. He returned seven punts for a touchdown in his college career, which tied the NCAA record in 1999.

== Professional career ==
In three NFL season, Allen appeared in twenty-three regular season games, and compiled 506 punt return yards and 1,513 kick return yards.

After leaving the Rams, Allen was signed by the Calgary Stampeders and played seven regular season games with the team from 2005 to 2006. He filled multiple roles for the team. In addition to scoring both rushing and receiving touchdowns on the offense, Allen was a kick and punt returner for the Stampeders.

He is the BLESTO scout for the Jacksonville Jaguars. In 2018, he was named to the Kansas Sports Hall of Fame.
