= 1997 Fiesta Bowl (December) =

1997 Tostitos Fiesta Bowl
- 27th Fiesta Bowl
| Kansas State Wildcats | Syracuse Orangemen |
| (10-1) | (9-3) |
| Big 12 | Big East |
| 35 | 18 |
| Head coach: Bill Snyder | Head coach: Paul Pasqualoni |
| AP / Coaches / BA; 10 / 9 / 10 | AP / Coaches / BA; 14 / 14 / 14 |
| | 1 | 2 | 3 | 4 | Total |
|---|---|---|---|---|---|
| Kansas State | 0 | 21 | 0 | 14 | 35 |
| Syracuse | 3 | 12 | 0 | 3 | 18 |
- Date: December 31, 1997
- Season: 1997
- Stadium: Sun Devil Stadium
- Location: Tempe, Arizona
- Favorite: Kansas State by 4
- Referee: David Witvoet (Big Ten)
- Attendance: 69,367

United States TV coverage
- Network: CBS
- Announcers: Tim Brando and Ed Cunningham

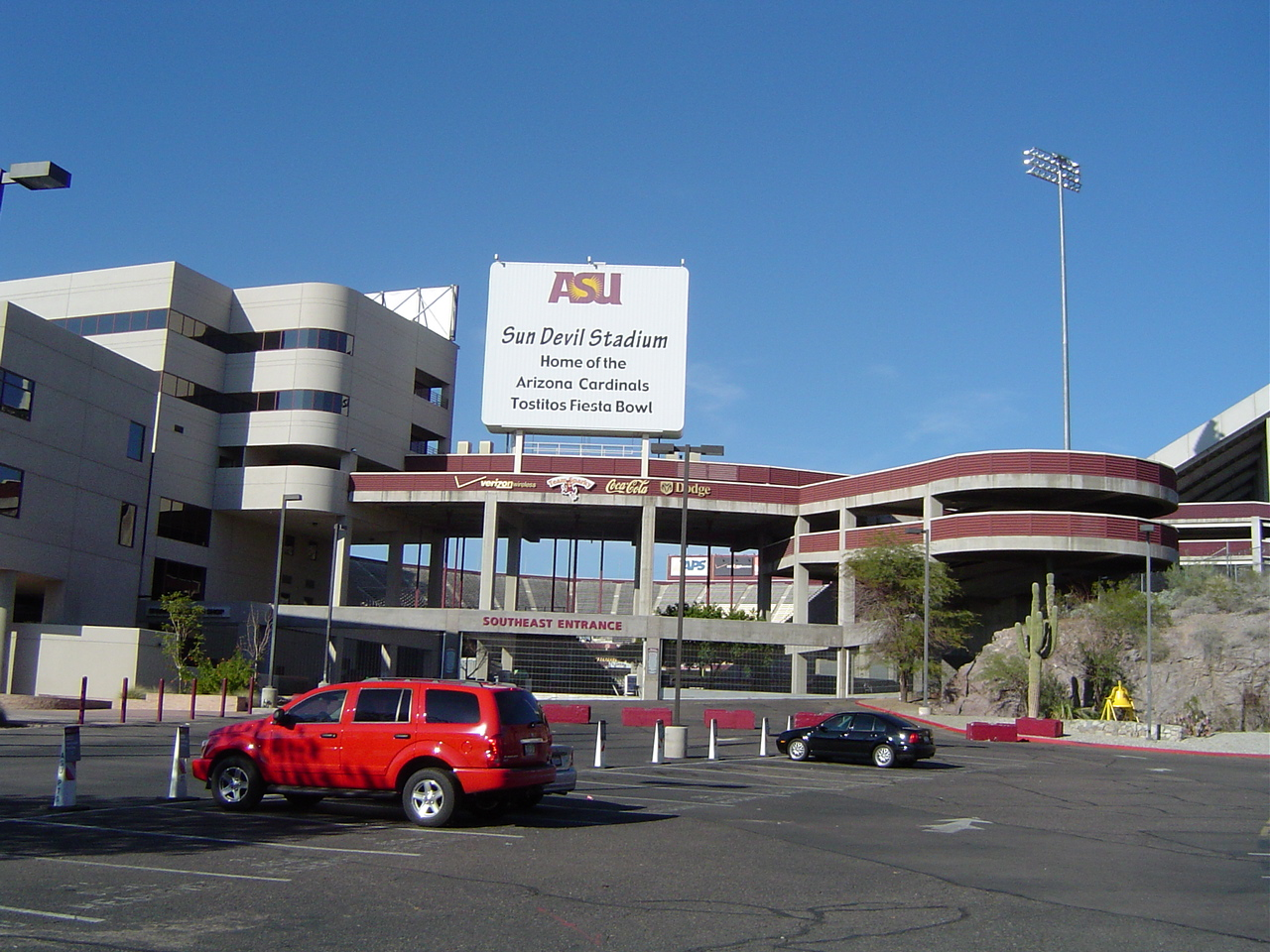
Sun Devil Stadium in Tempe, Arizona, hosted the Fiesta Bowl.

The 1997 Tostitos Fiesta Bowl game was a post-season college football bowl game between the Kansas State Wildcats and the Syracuse Orangemen on December 31, 1997, at Sun Devil Stadium in Tempe, Arizona. Kansas State defeated Syracuse, 35-18. The game was part of the 1997-1998 Bowl Alliance of the 1997 NCAA Division I-A football season and represented the concluding game of the season for both teams.

== First Quarter ==
The Orangemen jumped out to a 3-0 lead on the first of Nate Trout’s three field goals.

== Second Quarter ==
Kansas State quarterback Michael Bishop led the Wildcats to three-consecutive touchdowns in the second quarter. Following a failed fake field goal attempt by Syracuse, Bishop completed a 19-yard pass to Darnell McDonald. Bishop then followed with a 12-yard TD rush on their next possession, and ended with a 28-yard completion to Justin Swift on a tight end screen. Syracuse came back to score 12 points in the final 2:18 to cut the lead to 21–15 at the half.

== Third Quarter ==
No scoring occurred.

== Fourth Quarter ==
McDonald caught a 77-yard TD play from a long pass along the sidelines, and then followed with a 41-yard reception with 3:17 remaining to seal the game away.

== Aftermath ==
=== Kansas State ===
Bishop threw for four touchdown passes, completing a career-high 14 passes for a career-best 317 yards. He finished the game with 390 yards in total offense including 317 yards passing and 73 yards rushing.

McDonald caught seven of Bishop’s passes for a school-record of 206 yards and three touchdowns. His 77-yard reception in the fourth quarter was the longest in Fiesta Bowl history.

Swift caught a career-high five passes for a career-high 98 yards and one touchdown.

Bishop earned the Offensive Player of the Game award, while KSU linebacker Travis Ochs, was named Defensive Player of the Game after he had an interception and fumble recovery.

=== Syracuse ===
Quarterback Donovan McNabb threw for 271 yards and ran for 81 yards, but completed just 16 of 39 passes.

Syracuse’s eight-game bowl game win streak had ended.
