= Ralph Brown (cornerback) =

American football player (born 1978)

No. 22, 33, 20
- Position: Cornerback

Personal information
- Born: September 16, 1978 (age 48); Los Angeles, California, U.S.
- Listed height: 5 ft 10 in (1.78 m)
- Listed weight: 185 lb (84 kg)

Career information
- High school: Bishop Amat Memorial (La Puente, California)
- College: Nebraska
- NFL draft: 2000: 5th round, 140th overall pick

Career history
- New York Giants (2000–2003); Washington Redskins (2004)*; Minnesota Vikings (2004–2005); Cleveland Browns (2006); Arizona Cardinals (2007–2009)
- * Offseason or practice squad member only

Awards and highlights
- National champion (1997); Consensus All-American (1999); 3× First-team All-Big 12 (1997–1999)

Career NFL statistics
- Total tackles: 245
- Forced fumbles: 4
- Fumble recoveries: 3
- Pass deflections: 34
- Interceptions: 6
- Defensive touchdowns: 1
- Stats at Pro Football Reference

Ralph Davis Brown II (born September 16, 1978) is an American former professional football player who was a cornerback for 10 seasons in the National Football League (NFL). He played college football for the Nebraska Cornhuskers, earning consensus All-American honors in 1999. He played professionally for the New York Giants, Minnesota Vikings, Cleveland Browns and Arizona Cardinals of the NFL. He has biological children, but has given up his parental rights to them.

== Early life ==
Brown was born in Los Angeles, California. He attended Charles Bursch Elementary School in Baldwin Park, California as a child where he grew up. He also attended Bishop Amat Memorial High School in La Puente, California, where he was listed as the second-best defensive back in the country by Blue Chip and named to the Dream Team in 1995. He was named to USA Today's second-team All-America squad in the same year. During Ralph's senior season, he was seventh in the state in rushing with 2,246 yards on 311 carries and scored the game-winning touchdown in the Lancers' Division I championship win over Los Angeles' Loyola High in 1995. He earned CIF Southern Section Player of the Year and MVP, and the Los Angeles Times Back-of-the-Year honors, scoring 29 times, including a school-record 6 in one game. Defensively, he had 57 tackles and six interceptions. He also lettered three times in track. As a sophomore and junior Brown notched all-state honors as a cornerback.

== College career ==
Brown attended the University of Nebraska, where he played for the Nebraska Cornhuskers football team from 1996 to 1999. He finished career with 143 tackles, including 88 solo and is third on the Cornhuskers career list with 11 interceptions and first with 253 interception return yards. Brown also set a school record with 50 pass deflections. He was recognized as a consensus first-team All-American, having been named to the first teams of Walter Camp, College Football News and the Sporting News as a senior in 1999. He was also a semifinalist for the Jim Thorpe Award, given to the top defensive back in the country. In 1997 and 1998, he was an All-Big Twelve Conference first team selection. Brown was then an All-American third-team pick by the Associated Press and College Football News in 1998. He became a member of the Big Twelve Commissioner's Academic Honor Roll in 1997. One of six true freshmen who saw action for the Huskers in 1996, but the only one who earned a starting role. Brown became the first position player at Nebraska to start his first game as a true freshman since World War II.

== Professional career ==
He was selected in the fifth round (140th overall) of the 2000 NFL draft by the New York Giants. He played four seasons with the Giants from 2000 to 2003. In his first year Brown played in two games. He was inactive for the season opener vs. Arizona and saw his 1st NFL action at Philadelphia, playing only on special teams. His only action was on special teams at Chicago. He was forced to leave game in the 3rd quarter after taking a knee to the abdomen. Brown's injury was diagnosed as a laceration to the kidney. He was placed on season-ending injured reserve on October 2.

Next year played in eight games, with no starts and finished season with two assisted tackles on defense and five special teams tackles (4 solo). 2002 was his best year so far, he played in all 16 games, including his first two NFL starts, at St. Louis and at Washington. He was a reserve in NFC Wild Card game at San Francisco. He began the season as the dime (sixth) cornerback, but also played nickel corner. He finished with 25 tackles (19 solo), one interception, one fumble recovery, three passes defensed and eight special teams tackles (six solo).

In his last season with the Giants, Brown contributed in the secondary as a reserve and spot starter and on special teams, providing depth to the defensive backfield. He demonstrated nose for the ball on several key plays last season. Brown played in 11 games, starting seven. He missed three games with a shoulder injury and was assigned to injured reserve prior to Week 16 at Dallas. He finished the season with 41 tackles (28 solo), one sack, one forced fumble, two interceptions and one touchdown.

Brown also played for the Minnesota Vikings from 2004 to 2005, the Cleveland Browns in 2006, and the Arizona Cardinals from 2007 through 2009.

== Career statistics ==
=== NFL ===
Legend
**Bold**	Career high

==== Regular season ====
Year	Team	Games		Tackles					Interceptions					Fumbles			
Year	Team	GP	GS	Cmb	Solo	Ast	Sck	TFL	Int	Yds	TD	Lng	PD	FF	FR	Yds	TD
2000	NYG	2	0	0	0	0	0.0	0	0	0	0	0	0	0	0	0	0
2001	NYG	8	0	7	4	3	0.0	0	0	0	0	0	0	0	0	0	0
2002	NYG	**16**	2	**43**	30	**13**	0.0	0	1	19	0	19	3	0	**1**	**31**	0
2003	NYG	11	**7**	37	32	5	**1.0**	**2**	**2**	51	**1**	29	**8**	1	0	0	0
2004	MIN	12	0	14	10	4	0.0	1	0	0	0	0	0	0	0	0	0
2005	MIN	**16**	0	37	**34**	3	0.0	1	0	0	0	0	5	0	0	0	0
2006	CLE	**16**	4	36	33	3	0.0	0	0	0	0	0	**8**	0	0	0	0
2007	ARI	**16**	0	31	28	3	0.0	0	1	5	0	5	1	**3**	**1**	0	0
2008	ARI	**16**	3	23	19	4	0.0	1	1	0	0	0	6	0	**1**	11	0
2009	ARI	**16**	1	17	16	1	0.0	0	1	**85**	0	**80**	3	0	0	0	0
		129	17	245	206	39	1.0	5	6	160	1	80	34	4	3	42	0

==== Playoffs ====
Year	Team	Games		Tackles					Interceptions					Fumbles			
Year	Team	GP	GS	Cmb	Solo	Ast	Sck	TFL	Int	Yds	TD	Lng	PD	FF	FR	Yds	TD
2002	NYG	1	0	0	0	0	0.0	0	0	0	0	0	0	0	0	0	0
2004	MIN	2	0	1	1	0	0.0	0	1	**27**	0	**27**	1	0	0	0	0
2008	ARI	**4**	0	**4**	**4**	0	0.0	0	**2**	3	0	3	**2**	0	0	0	0
2009	ARI	2	0	**4**	3	**1**	0.0	0	0	0	0	0	1	0	0	0	0
		9	0	9	8	1	0.0	0	3	30	0	27	4	0	0	0	0

=== College ===
Year	School	G	GS	Tackles					Interceptions			
Year	School	G	GS	Solo	Ast	Tot	Sacks	Sacks-Yards	Int	PD	FF	FR
1996	Nebraska	13	13	16	13	29	1	1-1	4	12	0	1
1997	Nebraska	13	13	19	11	30	2	2–5	2	9	1	1
1998	Nebraska	13	13	28	22	50	2	2–3	2	17	0	1
1999	Nebraska	13	13	35	13	48	2	2–9	3	16	1	1

Notes - Statistics include bowl game performances.

== See also ==
- History of the New York Giants (1994–present)
