= Martin Gramatica =

Argentine-American gridiron football player (born 1975)

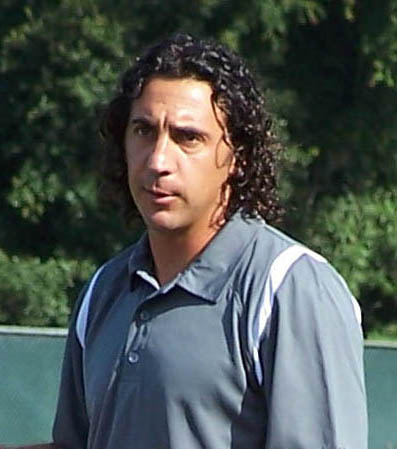
- Gramatica in 2008

No. 7, 10, 1
- Position: Kicker

Personal information
- Born: 27 November 1975 (age 50); Buenos Aires, Argentina
- Listed height: 5 ft 8 in (1.73 m)
- Listed weight: 170 lb (77 kg)

Career information
- High school: LaBelle (LaBelle, Florida, U.S.)
- College: Kansas State (1994–1998)
- NFL draft: 1999: 3rd round, 80th overall pick

Career history
- Tampa Bay Buccaneers (1999–2004); Indianapolis Colts (2004); New England Patriots (2006)*; Indianapolis Colts (2006); Dallas Cowboys (2006–2007); New Orleans Saints (2007–2008)
- * Offseason or practice squad member only

Awards and highlights
- Super Bowl champion (XXXVII); Second-team All-Pro (2000); Pro Bowl (2000); PFWA All-Rookie Team (1999); Lou Groza Award (1997); Consensus All-American (1997); Second-team All-American (1998); 2× First-team All-Big 12 (1997, 1998); Second-team AP All-Time All-American (2025); Kansas State Athletics Hall of Fame (2016); FBS record: Longest field goal made: 65 yards (Note: Kicked without tee)

Career NFL statistics
- Field goals attempted: 203
- Field goals made: 155
- Field goals percentage: 76.4%
- Longest field goal: 55
- Extra points attempted: 230
- Extra points made: 228
- Extra points percentage: 99.1%
- Stats at Pro Football Reference

Martin Gramatica (mar-TEEN grə-MAH-tih-kə; born 27 November 1975) is an Argentine-American former American football player who was a kicker in the National Football League (NFL) for the Tampa Bay Buccaneers, Indianapolis Colts, Dallas Cowboys, and New Orleans Saints. He played college football for the Kansas State Wildcats, winning the Lou Groza Award and twice earning All-American honors. He was selected by the Buccaneers in the third round of the 1999 NFL draft.

After retiring from football, Gramatica became head coach of soccer teams, having coached the Tampa Bay Strikers in the National Indoor Soccer League (NISL), where he stayed until the league merged with Major League Indoor Soccer in 2024.

== Early life ==
Gramatica was born in Buenos Aires, Argentina. At the age of nine, he moved with his family to the United States. The family settled in LaBelle, Florida, east of Fort Myers. He was only interested in playing soccer at LaBelle High School, but his kicking precision attracted the attention of the football coach of the school. He invited Gramatica to try out as the team's kicker.

Gramatica started to play American football during his senior year. He tallied 8-of-10 field goals, 22 extra points, and hit 38 of 49 kickoffs out of the end zone for touchbacks. His longest field goal was 52 yards.

== College career ==
Gramatica accepted a football scholarship from Kansas State University. As a freshman in 1994, he ranked eighth in the Big Eight Conference with 57 scored points, making 6-of-9 field goals (66.7%) and 38-of-39 extra points (97.4%).

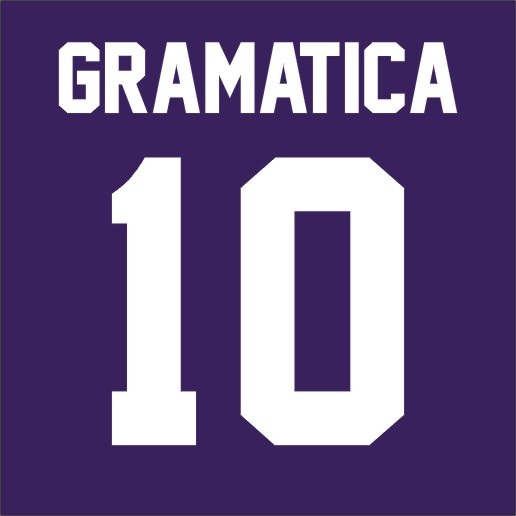
Gramatica wore #10 at Kansas State because of his admiration for soccer superstar Diego Maradona

As a sophomore in 1995, because of a very effective redzone offense, Gramatica saw his field goal opportunities reduced, connecting in 7-of-10 field goals (70%) and 43-of-46 extra points (93.5%).

In 1996, Gramatica was granted a medical redshirt, after tearing his right anterior cruciate ligament one week before the season opener.

As a junior in 1997, he posted 19-of-20 field goals (95%), 37-of-38 extra points (97.4%) and 94 scored points. He converted all three of his over 50-yard field goal attempts. He received the Lou Groza Award.

As a senior in 1998, he registered 22-of-31 field goals (71%) and 69-of-69 extra points (100%). He set the NCAA record for scoring by a kicker in a single-season with 135 points.

Gramatica kicked a 65-yard field goal against Northern Illinois University, which was the fourth-longest field goal in NCAA history, and the longest in NCAA history without the use of a tee. He finished in second place for the Lou Groza Award.

Gramática received his Bachelor of Science degree in social science from Kansas State in May 1999.

During his four seasons, he became the school's greatest placekicker. He made 54 out of 70 field goals and 187 of 192 point-after-touchdown attempts, gaining a school record of 349 points in four seasons. He set the single-season school record with 135 points and the longest field goal kicked from 65 yards. Those achievements earned him the nickname Automatica because whenever he attempted a field goal, it was taken for granted that it would be good.

In 2008, he was inducted into Kansas State's Ring of Honor. In 2013, he was inducted into the Kansas Sports Hall of Fame. In 2016, he was inducted into the Kansas State Athletics Hall of Fame.

== Professional career ==
=== Tampa Bay Buccaneers ===
Gramatica was selected by the Tampa Bay Buccaneers in the third round (80th overall) of the 1999 NFL draft. As a rookie, he began the season by making 10 consecutive field goals. In the tenth game against the Atlanta Falcons, he kicked 4-of-4 field goal attempts with a long of 53 yards. He was NFC Special Teams Player of the Week for his game against Atlanta. He was the NFC Special Teams Player of the Month for November. He tallied 27-of-32 field goal attempts (84.4%), 27-of-27 extra points (100%) and 106 points (franchise record). He was named to the PFWA All-Rookie Team.

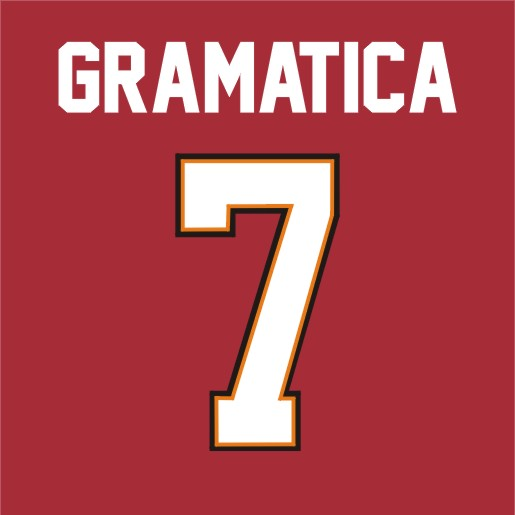
As his favorite number 10 was in use when he signed for the Buccaneers, Gramatica switched to number 7

In 2000, he posted 28-of-34 field goals (82.4%), 42-of-42 extra points and scored 126 points (new franchise record). In the seventh game against the Detroit Lions, he kicked 4-of-4 field goal attempts with a long of 55 yards. He was the NFC Special Teams Player of the Month for October. He was NFC Special Teams Player of the Week for Week 15 against the Miami Dolphins. He was the starter for the NFC Pro Bowl team.

In 2001, he scored 23-of-29 field goals (79.3%), 28-of-28 extra points (100%) and 97 points. Although he was known for jumping in celebration after every successful field goal attempt, he stopped this practice after his younger brother Bill Gramática tore his right anterior cruciate ligament, while playing for the Arizona Cardinals and celebrating in a similar manner after kicking a field goal. In Week 12, he won NFC Special Teams Player of the Week for his game against the Cincinnati Bengals. In the fifteenth game against the New Orleans Saints, he kicked 4-of-4 field goal attempts with a long of 32 yards, before suffering a right hamstring strain in the second half. He missed the season finale against the Baltimore Ravens. In the 13–17 Wild Card Round against the Philadelphia Eagles, he kicked 3-of-3 field goal attempts.

In 2002, he tallied 32-of-39 field goals (82.1%), 32-of-32 extra points (100%). In the eighth game against the Carolina Panthers, he scored the 400th career point, while kicking 4-of-4 field goals with a long of 53 yards. He won NFC Special Teams Player of the Week for Weeks 8 and 17. He was the NFC Special Teams Player of the Month for December. He was a part of the winning Super Bowl XXXVII team, making two field goals and six extra points for 12 points, while also becoming the first Argentine born player to be a part of the final game. Gramatica gained popularity that allowed him to sign exclusive contracts to make advertisement campaigns for diverse companies. The $14,500,000-contract signed with the Buccaneers in 2002 ranked him among the best-paid Argentine sportsmen after footballers Hernán Crespo, Juan Verón, and Gabriel Batistuta.

In 2003, Gramatica had a noticeable drop in accuracy in field goals of 40 yards or longer (4-of-11 for 36%). He collected 16-of-26 field goals (61.5%), 33-of-34 extra points and 81 points. In the fifth game against the Washington Redskins, he converted 5-of-5 extra points.

In 2004, his accuracy problems continued, registering 11-of-19 field goal (57.9%) and 21-of-22 extra points (95.5%) attempts. He did not make a field goal longer than 22 yards after the fifth game against the New Orleans Saints. In the eleventh game against the Carolina Panthers, he missed three field goal attempts (one was blocked), contributing to a 14–21 loss. He only connected on two of his last nine field goal attempts (22%). He was released two days later on 30 November and replaced with Jay Taylor.

=== Indianapolis Colts (first stint) ===
On 8 December 2004, he was signed by the Indianapolis Colts as a kickoff specialist, to complement kicker Mike Vanderjagt who had a groin injury, while reuniting with his former head coach Tony Dungy. He appeared in four games and averaged 61.8 yards per kickoff. He was not re-signed after the season.

In September 2005, Gramatica revealed in an interview with The News-Press of Fort Myers, that he believed the reason for his struggles the previous two seasons was because of torn muscles in his lower adductor and lower abdomen, which he had surgically repaired during the offseason. However, his rehabilitation was not completed until after the 2005 season started, and he remained out of football while rehabbing.

=== New England Patriots ===
On 6 April 2006, the New England Patriots signed him as a possible replacement for veteran Adam Vinatieri, who signed as a free agent with the Indianapolis Colts. Gramática competed with rookie fourth-round draft pick Stephen Gostkowski for the position. He made his only two preseason attempts against the Atlanta Falcons. He was released on 23 August.

=== Indianapolis Colts (second stint) ===
On 22 September 2006, Gramatica returned to the Colts for depth purposes, after Adam Vinatieri suffered a groin injury. He appeared in three games, making one field goal of 20 yards and three extra points against the New York Jets. He was released on 9 October.

=== Dallas Cowboys ===
On 27 November 2006, Gramatica was signed by the Dallas Cowboys, after the team released veteran Mike Vanderjagt. On 3 December, in his debut with the team, he kicked the game-winning 46-yard field goal against the New York Giants.

In the 20–21 Wild Card Round loss against the Seattle Seahawks, he made 2-of-2 field goals and 2-of-2 extra points. He also became part of Cowboys lore on fourth-and-one with 1:19 left in the game, Gramatica was going to attempt a 19-yard field goal for the go ahead score, when starting quarterback Tony Romo the holder for the kick, fumbled the snap, recovered the ball and attempted to run it for either a touchdown or a first down, but fumbled the ball while being tackled short of the first down marker, and turned the ball over on the Seattle 2-yard line.

On 5 March 2007, Gramatica signed a two-year extension with the Cowboys. He was passed on the depth chart by rookie Nick Folk during the preseason. After being placed on injured reserve with a strained right hamstring on 1 September, he was released on 25 September.

=== New Orleans Saints ===
On 12 December 2007, Gramatica was signed by the New Orleans Saints to handle the kicking duties for the final three games, after kicker Olindo Mare was injured. On 23 December, he matched his personal long field goal mark of 55 yards just before halftime in a pivotal game against the Philadelphia Eagles. He made 5-of-5 field goal (100%) and 8-of-8 extra points (100%) attempts.

In the 2008 preseason, he was challenged by sixth-round draft pick Taylor Mehlhaff for the team's placekicking job. Gramatica remained the starter as Mehlhaff was waived by the Saints on 30 August during the final roster cuts. Gramatica was perfect until 21 September, when he missed two critical field goals in a loss to the Denver Broncos. On 6 October, he had a field goal blocked that was returned for a touchdown and a missed 46-yard field goal just before the two-minute warning in a loss to the Minnesota Vikings. Just two days after the game against Minnesota, Gramática was placed on season-ending injured reserve with a groin injury on 8 October and the team re-signed Mehlhaff. He finished with 6-of-10 field goals (60%) and 16-of-16 extra points (100%).

== Soccer coaching career ==
Gramatica is a soccer fan and supports Boca Juniors. He has said that he chose the number 7 jersey as a tribute to Guillermo Barros Schelotto, whom he considers one of his idols.

In March 2021, the West Florida Flames, another club in the Tampa Bay area, announced Gramatica had been added to the coaching staff for the 2021–22 season In 2022, he also became coach of the "Tampa Bay Strikers", a recently formed indoor soccer team in the city that competed in now defunct National Indoor Soccer League (NISL). Gramática took charge of both, men's and women's teams, which debuted in the league in April 2023.

After his tenure in the NISL, Gramatica continued his coaching career with the West Florida Flames u13 girls team. Under his guidance, in 2024 the Flames qualified to the nationals, held in Los Angeles.

Gramatica admitted former Buccaneers coach Tony Dungy molded his soccer coaching style.

== Personal life ==
His younger brother, Bill, was also a kicker in the NFL. His son, Nico, is a kicker for the USF Bulls football team. On 25 July 2022, it was announced that Gramatica would serve as the head coach for the newly announced Tampa Bay Strikers of the National Indoor Soccer League (NISL).
