= Mario Fatafehi =

American gridiron football player (born 1979)

No. 79, 92, 68
- Position: Defensive tackle

Personal information
- Born: January 27, 1979 (age 47); Chicago, Illinois, U.S.
- Listed height: 6 ft 2 in (1.88 m)
- Listed weight: 300 lb (136 kg)

Career information
- High school: Farrington (Honolulu, Hawaii)
- College: Snow College (1997-1998); Kansas State (1999-2000)
- NFL draft: 2001: 5th round, 133rd overall pick

Career history
- Arizona Cardinals (2001–2002); Carolina Panthers (2002); Denver Broncos (2003–2004); Hamilton Tiger-Cats (2006)

Awards and highlights
- First-team All-American (2000); First-team All-Big 12 (2000); Second-team All-Big 12 (1999); Big 12 Defensive Newcomer of the Year (1999)

Career NFL statistics
- Tackles: 57
- Sacks: 5
- Forced fumbles: 1
- Stats at Pro Football Reference

Mario Fatafehi (born January 27, 1979) is an American former professional football player who was a defensive tackle in the National Football League (NFL). He was selected in the fifth round of the 2001 NFL draft with the 133rd overall pick. His professional career involved stints with the NFL's Arizona Cardinals, Carolina Panthers and Denver Broncos. He also played for the Hamilton Tiger-Cats of the Canadian Football League (CFL).

Fatafehi played college football for the Kansas State Wildcats. He started 24 consecutive games at defensive tackle for Kansas State University and registered 128 tackles and 12 sacks after transferring from Snow College; he posted 80 tackles and 8.5 sacks as a senior at Kansas State to earn first-team All-Big 12 Conference honors; as a junior, he picked up Big 12 Defensive Newcomer-of-the-Year honors as well as second-team all-conference accolades. Fatafehi was a first-team junior college All-American at Snow College, where he was the team's defensive captain and most valuable player as a two-year starter.

Before attending Kansas State, he played at Snow College and graduated from Farrington High School in Honolulu. His older brother Toni attended Foothill College and later the University of Utah.
