= Mark Simoneau =

American football player (born 1977)

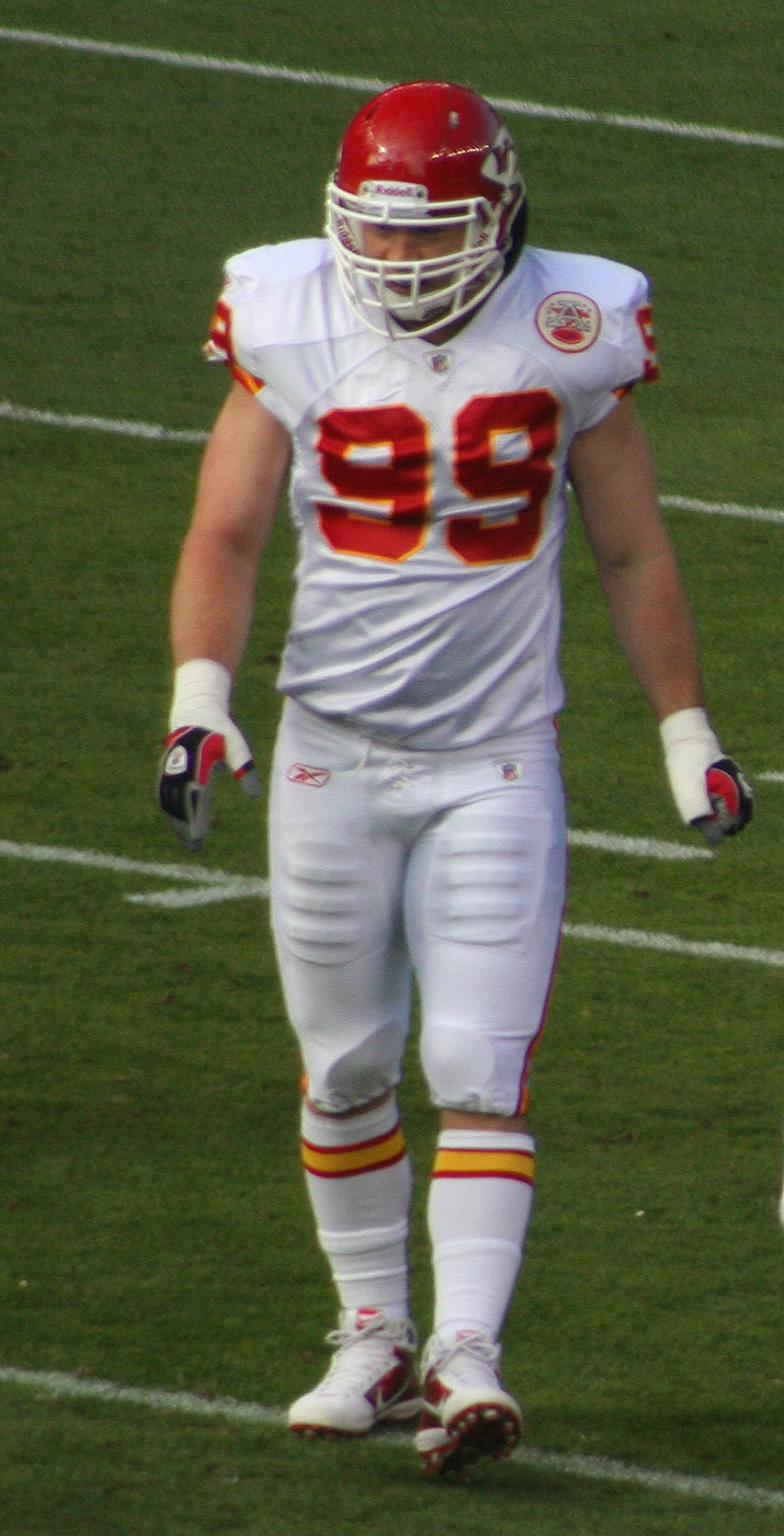
- Simoneau with the Kansas City Chiefs in 2010

No. 53, 50, 99
- Position: Linebacker

Personal information
- Born: January 16, 1977 (age 49); Phillipsburg, Kansas, U.S.
- Listed height: 6 ft 0 in (1.83 m)
- Listed weight: 245 lb (111 kg)

Career information
- High school: Smith Center (Smith Center, Kansas)
- College: Kansas State
- NFL draft: 2000: 3rd round, 67th overall pick

Career history
- Atlanta Falcons (2000–2002); Philadelphia Eagles (2003–2005); New Orleans Saints (2006–2009); Kansas City Chiefs (2010)

Awards and highlights
- Super Bowl champion (XLIV); Consensus All-American (1999); Big 12 Defensive Freshman of the Year (1996); Big 12 Defensive Player of the Year (1999); First-team All-Big 12 (1999); 2× Second-team All-Big 12 (1997, 1998)

Career NFL statistics
- Total tackles: 416
- Sacks: 7
- Forced fumbles: 8
- Fumble recoveries: 3
- Interceptions: 1
- Stats at Pro Football Reference
- College Football Hall of Fame

Mark Lee Simoneau (born January 16, 1977) is an American former professional football player who was a linebacker for 10 seasons in the National Football League (NFL). He played college football for the Kansas State Wildcats, earning consensus All-American honors in 1999. He was selected by the Atlanta Falcons in the third round of the 2000 NFL draft, and played for the Falcons, Philadelphia Eagles, New Orleans Saints and Kansas City Chiefs of the NFL.

== Early life ==
Simoneau was born in Phillipsburg, Kansas. He played high school football at Smith Center High School in Smith Center, Kansas. He was a top 11 all-state (all classifications) selection at running back and linebacker for the Smith Center Redmen. He was also the 1995 Class 3A state shot put champion, and a former record holder, throwing over 60 feet as a senior.

== College career ==
Simoneau attended Kansas State University, where he played for the Kansas State Wildcats football team from 1996 to 1999. He was recognized as a consensus first-team All-American and the Big 12 Conference Defensive Player of the Year after the 1999 season. He registered 400 tackles during his college career at Kansas State.

Simoneau was honored for his college career with induction into the College Football Hall of Fame in December 2012. He became only the second Kansas State player so recognized, the first being another former Wildcat linebacker, Gary Spani.

== Professional career ==
=== Atlanta Falcons ===
Simoneau was selected by the Atlanta Falcons in the third round of the 2000 NFL draft with the 67th overall pick.

=== Philadelphia Eagles ===
Simoneau was traded to the Philadelphia Eagles in March 2003, and signed a five-year contract with the team. Simoneau was acquired by the Philadelphia Eagles prior to the 2003 season, and led the team in tackles that year. During the 2005 season, Simoneau kicked a PAT for his first NFL points. The last defensive player to kick an extra point had been Ted Thompson of the Houston Oilers on November 23, 1980.

=== New Orleans Saints ===
On August 28, 2006, Simoneau was traded to the New Orleans Saints along with a conditional fourth-round pick in the 2007 NFL draft for Donté Stallworth.

He was placed on season-ending injured reserve on August 16, 2009, with a torn triceps muscle. He was released on March 4, 2010.

=== Kansas City Chiefs ===
Simoneau was signed by the Kansas City Chiefs on October 27, 2010. He was placed on injured reserve on November 17, and announced his retirement from the NFL on November 18.

=== NFL statistics ===
Year	Team	Games	Combined tackles	Tackles	Assisted tackles	Sacks	Forced fumbles	Fumble recoveries
2000	ATL	14	46	35	11	0.5	0	0
2001	ATL	16	38	31	7	0.0	2	1
2002	ATL	15	16	13	3	0.0	1	1
2003	PHI	16	100	78	22	2.0	3	0
2004	PHI	14	48	33	15	1.5	1	1
2005	PHI	16	36	27	9	0.0	1	0
2006	NO	16	61	33	28	1.0	0	0
2007	NO	16	70	50	20	2.0	0	0
2010	KC	1	1	1	0	0.0	0	0
Career		124	416	301	115	7.0	8	3
