= List of All-Big 12 Conference football teams =

The All-Big 12 Conference football team is an annual Big 12 Conference honor bestowed on the best players in the conference following every college football season.

== Seasons ==
Following is a list of all-conference teams in the history of the Big 12:

- 1996 All-Big 12 Conference football team
- 1997 All-Big 12 Conference football team
- 1998 All-Big 12 Conference football team
- 1999 All-Big 12 Conference football team
- 2000 All-Big 12 Conference football team
- 2001 All-Big 12 Conference football team
- 2002 All-Big 12 Conference football team
- 2003 All-Big 12 Conference football team
- 2004 All-Big 12 Conference football team
- 2005 All-Big 12 Conference football team
- 2006 All-Big 12 Conference football team
- 2007 All-Big 12 Conference football team
- 2008 All-Big 12 Conference football team
- 2009 All-Big 12 Conference football team
- 2010 All-Big 12 Conference football team
- 2011 All-Big 12 Conference football team
- 2012 All-Big 12 Conference football team
- 2013 All-Big 12 Conference football team
- 2014 All-Big 12 Conference football team
- 2015 All-Big 12 Conference football team
- 2016 All-Big 12 Conference football team
- 2017 All-Big 12 Conference football team
- 2018 All-Big 12 Conference football team
- 2019 All-Big 12 Conference football team
- 2020 All-Big 12 Conference football team
- 2021 All-Big 12 Conference football team
- 2022 All-Big 12 Conference football team
- 2023 All-Big 12 Conference football team
- 2024 All-Big 12 Conference football team
- 2025 All-Big 12 Conference football team
