= 1998 Kansas State Wildcats football team =

American college football season

1998 Kansas State Wildcats football

Big 12 North champion

Big 12 Championship Game, L 33–36^{2OT} vs. Texas A&M

Alamo Bowl, L 34–37 vs. Purdue
- Conference: Big 12 Conference
- North Division

Ranking
- Coaches: No. 9
- AP: No. 10
- Record: 11–2 (8–0 Big 12)
- Head coach: Bill Snyder (10th season)
- Offensive coordinator: Ron Hudson (2nd season)
- Offensive scheme: Pro-style
- Defensive coordinator: Mike Stoops (3rd season)
- Base defense: 4–3
- Home stadium: KSU Stadium

1998 Big 12 Conference football standings
	Conf.			Overall
Team	W		L	W		L
North Division
No. 10 Kansas State x	8	–	0	11	–	2
No. 19 Nebraska	5	–	3	9	–	4
No. 21 Missouri	5	–	3	8	–	4
Colorado	4	–	4	8	–	4
Kansas	1	–	7	4	–	7
Iowa State	1	–	7	3	–	8
South Division
No. 11 Texas A&M x$	7	–	1	11	–	3
No. 15 Texas	6	–	2	9	–	3
Texas Tech	4	–	4	7	–	5
Oklahoma State	3	–	5	5	–	6
Oklahoma	3	–	5	5	–	6
Baylor	1	–	7	2	–	9
Championship: Texas A&M 36, Kansas State 33
$ – BCS representative as conference champion; x – Division champion/co-champions; Rankings from AP Poll

The 1998 Kansas State Wildcats football team represented Kansas State University as a member of the North Division of the Big 12 Conference during the 1998 NCAA Division I-A football season. Led by tenth-year head coach Bill Snyder, the Wildcats compiled an overall record of 11–2 with a mark of 8–0 in conference play, winning Big 12's North Division title.

The Wildcats finished the regular season undefeated (11–0) and were ranked second in the nation ahead of their match-up with tenth-ranked Texas A&M in the 1998 Big 12 Championship Game. Kansas State lost in overtime, losing their chance at a national championship. After the Big 12 title game, Kansas State did not receive a spot in the inaugural Bowl Championship Series (BCS) despite being ranked third, the highest ranking of non-champion from any conference. They also were not invited to the Cotton Bowl Classic in Dallas, as the Big 12 runner-up typically would be, or the Holiday Bowl in San Diego, which at the time was contracted to invite the third place team in the conference; those bowls chose Texas and Nebraska instead. Instead, Kansas State was invited to the Alamo Bowl, where the Wildcats lost to the unranked Purdue Boilermakers, who drove 80 yards for a touchdown in the final minute to defeat Kansas State 37–34. Following the season, a new rule was created. Nicknamed the "Kansas State Rule", the No. 3 ranked team would always have an automatic bid to a BCS bowl game.

The Wildcats finished the season as the top scoring team in NCAA Division I-A, at 48 points per game, and set a school record for points scored with 610.

== Schedule ==
Date	Time	Opponent	Rank	Site	TV	Result	Attendance	Source
September 5	6:10 p.m.	Indiana State*	No. 6	KSU Stadium; Manhattan, KS		W 66–0	41,728	
September 12	11:30 a.m.	Northern Illinois*	No. 5	KSU Stadium; Manhattan, KS	FSN	W 73–7	41,967	
September 19	2:30 p.m.	Texas	No. 5	KSU Stadium; Manhattan, KS	ABC	W 48–7	43,714	
September 26	1:10 p.m.	Northeast Louisiana*	No. 5	KSU Stadium; Manhattan, KS		W 62–7	42,029	
October 10	6:00 p.m.	at No. 14 Colorado	No. 5	Folsom Field; Boulder, CO (rivalry)	FX	W 16–9	51,581	
October 17	2:30 p.m.	Oklahoma State	No. 4	KSU Stadium; Manhattan, KS	ABC	W 52–20	43,694	
October 24	1:10 p.m.	Iowa State^{†}	No. 4	KSU Stadium; Manhattan, KS (rivalry)		W 52–7	43,203	
October 31	11:30 a.m.	at Kansas	No. 4	Memorial Stadium; Lawrence, KS (rivalry)	FSN	W 54–6	43,000	
November 7	1:00 p.m.	at Baylor	No. 4	Floyd Casey Stadium; Waco, TX		W 49–6	38,217	
November 14	2:30 p.m.	No. 11 Nebraska	No. 2	KSU Stadium; Manhattan, KS (rivalry, College GameDay)	ABC	W 40–30	44,298	
November 21	2:30 p.m.	at No. 19 Missouri	No. 2	Faurot Field; Columbia, MO	ABC	W 31–25	68,174	
December 5	2:30 p.m.	vs. No. 10 Texas A&M	No. 2	Trans World Dome; St. Louis, MO (Big 12 Championship Game)	ABC	L 33–36 ^{2OT}	60,798	
December 29	7:00 p.m.	vs. Purdue*	No. 4	Alamodome; San Antonio, TX (Alamo Bowl)	ESPN	L 34–37	60,780	
*Non-conference game; ^{†}Homecoming; Rankings from AP Poll released prior to the game; All times are in Central time

== Rankings ==
Ranking movements Legend: ██ Increase in ranking ██ Decrease in ranking ( ) = First-place votes
	Week															
Poll	Pre	1	2	3	4	5	6	7	8	9	10	11	12	13	14	Final
AP	6 (2)	5 (2)	5 (2)	5 (2)	5 (2)	5 (2)	4 (2)	4 (2)	4 (2)	4 (3)	2 (19)	2 (29)	2 (24)	2 (24)	4	10
Coaches	6 (1)	5 (1)	4 (1)	3 (1)	3 (1)	4 (1)	3 (2)	3 (3)	3 (5)	2 (5)	1 (30)	1 (36 1/2)	1 (31 1/2)	1 (30 1/2)	4	9
BCS	Not released								4	4	3	3	3	3	3	Not released

== Game summaries ==
=== Indiana State ===
Indiana State Sycamores (0–0) vs Kansas State Wildcats (0–0) – Game summary

Quarter	1	2	3	4	Total
Sycamores	0	0	0	0	0
No. 6 Wildcats	21	17	14	14	66

at KSU Stadium • Manhattan, Kansas

- Date: September 5
- Game time: 6:10 p.m.
- Game weather:
- Game attendance: 41,728
- Referee:
- TV announcers ( ):

Game information

First quarter

- KSU – Michael Bishop 1-yard run (Martín Gramática kick) 7:13
- KSU – DeAndrea Robinson 6-yard blocked punt (Martín Gramática kick) 5:46
- KSU – Eric Hickson 7-yard run (Martín Gramática kick) 3:22

Second quarter

- KSU – Michael Bishop 8-yard run (Martín Gramática kick) 7:26
- KSU – David Allen 63-yard punt return (Martín Gramática kick) 5:17
- KSU – Martín Gramática 55-yard field goal 0:09

Third quarter

- KSU - Gavin Peries 58-yard pass from Bishop (Martín Gramática kick) 12:12
- KSU - Brian Goolsby 7-yard run (Martín Gramática kick) 6:51

Fourth quarter

- KSU - David Conley 3-yard run (Martín Gramática kick) 14:54
- KSU - Marlon Charles 39-yard run (Martín Gramática kick) 11:43

=== Northern Illinois ===
Northern Illinois at No. 5 Kansas State

Team	1	2	3	4	Total
Huskies	7	0	0	0	7
• No. 5 Wildcats	25	34	7	7	73

- Date: September 5
- Location: KSU Stadium, Manhattan, Kansas
- Game start: 11:30 am CST
- Game attendance: 41,967

First quarter
KSU - Allen 1-yard run (Gramatica kick) 8:18
KSU - Allen 69-yard punt return (Shad Meier pass from Jeremy Milne) 7:10
NIU - Bill Andrews 1-yard run (Clark kick) 2:43
KSU - Gramatica 46-yard field goal 1:33
KSU - Cooper 15-yard interception return (Gramatica kick) 1:12

Second quarter
KSU - Bishop 2-yard run (Gramatica kick) 14:05
KSU - Bishop 2-yard run (Gramatica kick) 9:46
KSU - Hickson 36 pass from Bishop (Gramatica kick) 8:01
KSU - Gramatica 37-yard field goal 4:10
KSU - Marlon Charles 4-yard run (Gramatica kick) 2:35
KSU - Gramatica 65-yard field goal 0:02

Third quarter
KSU - McDonald 27 pass from Bishop (Gramatica kick) 10:20

Fourth quarter
KSU - Helm 5-yard run (Goodnow kick) 13:03

=== Texas ===
Texas at No. 5 Kansas State

Team	1	2	3	4	Total
Longhorns	0	0	0	7	7
• No. 5 Wildcats	7	28	0	13	48

- Date: September 18
- Location: KSU Stadium, Manhattan, Kansas
- Game start: 2:30 pm CST
- Game attendance: 44,298
- Game weather: Partly Cloudy; 95 °F (35 °C); wind 22 mph (35 km/h) S
- Referee: Tim Ahlers
- TV announcers (ESPN2): Brad Nessler and Bob Griese

Kansas State welcomed Texas for their first Big 12 Conference matchup, and first meeting since 1942, and Texas' first trip to Manhattan since 1926. 1998 Heisman Trophy winner Ricky Williams was held to just 43 yards on 25 carries for an average of just 1.7 yards per carry. He did not score in the game. Williams averaged 202 rushing yards per game in 1998 and was held to a season low 43 yards, his next lowest yardage output was 90 yards against Oklahoma State. K-State racked up 223 yards on the ground on 51 carries and the Wildcats won handily, 48–7.

First quarter
KSU - Eric Hickson 44 run (Gramatica kick)

Second quarter
KSU - McDonald 7 pass from Bishop (Gramatica kick)
KSU - Allen 93-yard punt return (Gramatica kick)
KSU - Kelly 17 interception return (Gramatica kick)
KSU - Bishop 1-yard run (Gramatica kick)

Fourth quarter
UT - McGarity 13 pass from Applewhite (Stockton kick)
KSU - McDonald 7 pass from Bishop (kick blocked)
KSU - Charles 2 run (Gramatica kick)

=== Northeast Louisiana ===
Northeast Louisiana at No. 5 Kansas State

Team	1	2	3	4	Total
Indians	7	0	0	0	7
• No. 5 Wildcats	7	10	24	21	62

- Date: September 26
- Location: KSU Stadium, Manhattan, Kansas
- Game start: 1:10 pm CST
- Game attendance: 42,029

First quarter
KSU - Lockett 33 pass from Bishop (Gramatica kick)
NELA - Spencer 1 pass from Vige (Babineaux kick)

Second quarter
KSU - Hickson 4 run (Gramatica kick)
KSU - Gramatica 39-yard field goal

Third quarter
KSU - Gramatica 24-yard field goal
KSU - Lockett 97 pass from Bishop (Gramatica kick)
KSU - Hickson 19 run (Gramatica kick)
KSU - Swift 28 pass from Bishop (Gramatica kick)

Fourth quarter
KSU - McDonald 22 pass from Bishop (Gramatica kick)
KSU - Hickson 5 run (Gramatica kick)
KSU - Charles 7 run (Gramatica kick)

=== At No. 14 Colorado ===
No. 5 Kansas State at No. 14 Colorado

Team	1	2	3	4	Total
• No. 5 Wildcats	3	7	3	3	16
No. 14 Buffaloes	0	0	0	9	9

- Date: October 10
- Location: Folsom Field, Boulder, Colorado
- Game start: 6:00 pm CST
- Game attendance: 51,581
- Referee: Randy Christal
- TV announcers (FX): Ron Thulin, Artie Gigantino and Eric Clemons

Kansas State beat Colorado for the second consecutive year (only their second win against the Buffaloes since 1984) and won their first game in Boulder since 1973. K-State came to Boulder with a 2-24 all-time record in games played in Boulder. K-State came to Colorado beating the opposition by an average of 57 points a game, and had a defense which had allowed a total of 21 points in its first 4 games. Colorado was a 17-point underdog and had only lost once in the last 13 seasons to the Wildcats. Colorado held K-State, which was averaging 470 yards and 62 points coming into the game, to 332 yards and just 16 points. Colorado had just 225 yards of total offense, including 37 yards rushing on 31 attempts.

First quarter
KSU - Gramatica 30-yard field goal

Second quarter
KSU - Goolsby 2-yard run (Gramatica kick)

Third quarter
KSU - Gramatica 34-yard field goal

Fourth quarter
KSU - Gramatica 41-yard field goal 4:10
CU - Stiggers 5-yard pass from Moschetti (pass failed)
CU - Aldrich 20-yard field goal

=== Oklahoma State ===
Oklahoma State at No. 4 Kansas State

Team	1	2	3	4	Total
Cowboys	3	10	0	7	20
• No. 4 Wildcats	14	14	10	14	52

- Date: October 17
- Location: KSU Stadium, Manhattan, Kansas
- Game start: 2:30 pm CST
- Game attendance: 43,694

First quarter
KSU - Bishop 1-yard run (Gramatica kick)
OSU - Sydnes 32 yard FG
KSU - Lockett 59 pass from Bishop (Gramatica kick)

Second quarter
OSU - Sydnes 40 yard FG
KSU - Lockett 81 pass from Bishop (Gramatica kick)
KSU - Murphy 46 pass from Bishop (Gramatica kick)
OSU - Richardson 14 pass from Tony Lindsay (Sydnes kick)

Third quarter
KSU - Gramatica 43-yard field goal
KSU - Murphy 2 run (Gramatica kick)

Fourth quarter
OSU - Rivers 6 pass from Chaloupka (Sydnes kick)
KSU - Bishop 3-yard run (Gramatica kick)
KSU - Hickson 22-yard run (Gramatica kick)

=== Iowa State ===
Iowa State at No. 4 Kansas State

Team	1	2	3	4	Total
Cyclones	0	0	0	7	7
• No. 4 Wildcats	14	14	7	17	52

- Date: October 24
- Location: KSU Stadium, Manhattan, Kansas
- Game start: 1:10 pm CST
- Game attendance: 42,203

First quarter
KSU - Hickson 5-yard run (Gramatica kick)
KSU - Lockett 13 pass from Bishop (Gramatica kick)

Second quarter
KSU - McDonald 20 pass from Bishop (Gramatica kick)
KSU - Peries 30 pass from Bishop (Gramatica kick)

Third quarter
KSU - Helm 1 run (Gramatica kick)

Fourth quarter
KSU - Gramatica 31-yard field goal
KSU - Goolsby 9 run (Gramatica kick)
ISU - Groce 14 pass from Bandhauer (Kohl kick)
KSU - Murphy 11 run (Gramatica kick)

=== At Kansas ===
No. 4 Kansas State at Kansas

Team	1	2	3	4	Total
• No. 4 Wildcats	7	16	14	17	54
Jayhawks	0	6	0	0	6

- Date: October 31
- Location: Memorial Stadium, Lawrence, Kansas
- Game start: 11:30 am CST
- Game attendance: 43,000

First quarter
KSU - Bishop 10-yard run (Gramatica kick)

Second quarter
KSU - Gramatica 30-yard field goal
KSU - Gramatica 45-yard field goal
KU - Chandler 8 pass from Alexander (kick failed)
KSU - Murphy 1 run (Gramatica kick)
KSU - Gramatica 36-yard field goal

Third quarter
KSU - Swift 1 pass from Bishop (Gramatica kick)
KSU - Hickson 9-yard run (Gramatica kick)
KSU - Gramatica 26-yard field goal

Fourth quarter
KSU - Bishop 9-yard run (Gramatica kick)
KSU - Charles 31-yard run (Gramatica kick)

=== At Baylor ===
No. 4 Kansas State at Baylor

Team	1	2	3	4	Total
• No. 4 Wildcats	14	7	7	21	49
Bears	0	0	3	3	6

- Date: November 7
- Location: Floyd Casey Stadium, Waco, Texas
- Game start: 1:00 p.m. CST
- Game attendance: 38,217

First quarter
KSU - Hickson 7-yard run 13:33 (Gramatica kick)
KSU - Lockett 37 pass from Bishop (Gramatica kick) 11:44

Second quarter
KSU - McDonald 6 pass from Bishop (Gramatica kick) 8:06

Third quarter
BU - Bryant 26 FG 5:53
KSU - Goolsby 24 run 2:51 (Gramatica kick)

Fourth quarter
BU - Bryant 45 FG 13:25
KSU - Bishop 1-yard run 9:22 (Gramatica kick)
KSU - Allen 77-yard punt return (Gramatica kick) 5:28
KSU - Helm 1 run (Gramatica kick) 0:00

=== No. 11 Nebraska ===
No. 11 Nebraska at No. 2 Kansas State

Team	1	2	3	4	Total
No. 11 Cornhuskers	7	10	7	6	30
• No. 2 Wildcats	7	7	10	16	40

- Date: November 14
- Location: KSU Stadium, Manhattan, Kansas
- Game start: 2:30 pm CST
- Game attendance: 44,298

Michael Bishop threw for 306 yards and 2 touchdowns, and ran for 140 yards and two more scores as the Wildcats finally broke through against the Huskers. Kansas State beat Nebraska for the first time since 1968 (for a total of 10,962 days) and the first time in Manhattan since 1959. With the win and Missouri's loss to Texas A&M the same day, Kansas State clinched the Big 12 North Division and a bid in the Big 12 Championship game.

First quarter
NU - Jackson 7 pass from Crouch 11:29 (Brown kick)
KSU - Bishop 2-yard run 3:32 (Gramatica kick)

Second quarter
NU - Cheatham 45 pass from Crouch 11:00 (Brown kick)
NU - Brown 18 FG 4:55
KSU - Bishop 1-yard run 0:49 (Gramatica kick)

Third quarter
KSU - McDonald 17 pass from Bishop (Gramatica kick) 8:20
KSU - Gramatica 26-yard field goal 5:03
NU - Brown 74 yard fumble return (Brown kick) 1:05

Fourth quarter
KSU - Gramatica 21-yard field goal 10:57
NU - Jackson 9 pass from Crouch 8:22 (kick failed)
KSU - McDonald 11 pass from Bishop (Gramatica kick) 5:25
KSU - Kelly 23 fumble return (two point conversion failed) 0:03

=== At No. 19 Missouri ===
No. 2 Kansas State at No. 19 Missouri

Team	1	2	3	4	Total
• No. 2 Wildcats	7	3	14	7	31
No. 19 Tigers	0	13	3	9	25

- Date: November 21
- Location: Faurot Field, Columbia, Missouri
- Game start: 2:30 pm CST
- Game attendance: 68,174
- Television network: ABC

Kansas State visited Columbia with their national title hopes very much alive and were able to squeak out a 31–25 victory. School rushing career record Eric Hickson missed the game with a high ankle sprain and was replaced by Marlon Charles, David Allen, and Frank Murphy in the backfield. Kansas State's running back depth was further affected when Marlon Charles suffered a broken hip in the third quarter. Second team All-American kicker Martin Gramatica uncharacteristically missed two field goals. Punt returner David Allen nearly returned his seventh career punt return for a touchdown, setting up a nine yard Frank Murphy touchdown run for Kansas State to go up 24-13 in the third quarter. Kansas State's Keith Black downed a late punt at the two foot line to cause Missouri to have to try to drive 99 yards to win or tie on their final drive, and Frank Murphy fell on his own fumble in the end zone for a touchdown to help to preserve a Kansas State win. The Wildcats won their sixth consecutive game over the Tigers (they would eventually extend the streak to 13 games).

First quarter
KSU - Peries 10 pass from Bishop (Gramatica kick)

Second quarter
KSU - Gramatica 48-yard field goal
MU - Jones 5 yard run (Long kick)
MU - Wise 20 pass from Jones (kick failed)

Third quarter
KSU - Bishop 1-yard run 0:49 (Gramatica kick)
KSU - Murphy 9 run (Gramatica kick)
MU - Long 21 FG

Fourth quarter
MU - Dausman 20 pass from Jones (pass failed)
KSU - Murphy fumble recovery in end zone (Gramatica kick)
MU - Long 29 FG

=== Vs. No. 10 Texas A&M (Big 12 Championship Game) ===
1998 Big 12 Championship Game
No. 2 Kansas State vs. No. 10 Texas A&M

Team	1	2	3	4	OT	2OT	Total
No. 2 Wildcats	10	7	10	0	3	3	33
• No. 10 Aggies	0	6	6	15	3	6	36

- Date: December 5
- Location: Trans World Dome, St. Louis, Missouri
- Game start: 2:30 p.m. CST
- Game attendance: 60,798
- Referee: Randy Cristal

Scoring summary
Q1	6:31	KSU	Martin Gramatica 47-yard field goal	KSU 3–0
Q1	2:02	KSU	Justin Swift 15-yard pass from Michael Bishop (Gramatica kick)	KSU 10–0
Q2	11:00	A&M	Russell Bynum 25-yard field goal	KSU 10–3
Q2	10:37	KSU	Darnell McDonald 66-yard pass from Michael Bishop (Gramatica kick)	KSU 17–3
Q2	4:16	A&M	Russell Bynum 26-yard field goal	KSU 17–6
Q3	8:42	A&M	Ja'Mar Toombs 2-yard run (pass failed)	KSU 17–12
Q3	4:31	KSU	Martin Gramatica 45-yard field goal	KSU 20–12
Q3	4:31	KSU	Michael Bishop 5-yard run (Gramatica kick)	KSU 27–12
Q4	9:20	A&M	Leroy Hodge 13-yard pass from Branndon Stewart (Bynum kick)	KSU 27–19
Q4	1:05	A&M	Sirr Parker 9-yard pass from Branndon Stewart (Parker pass from Stewart)	Tied 27–27
OT		A&M	Russell Bynum 18-yard field goal	A&M 30–27
OT		KSU	Martin Gramatica 22-yard field goal	Tied 30–30
2OT		KSU	Martin Gramatica 22-yard field goal	KSU 33–30
2OT		A&M	Sirr Parker 32-yard pass from Branndon Stewart	A&M 36–33

K-State lost in devastating fashion in double overtime and lost their chance at playing in the National Championship.

=== Vs. Purdue (Alamo Bowl) ===
1998 Alamo Bowl
No. 4 Kansas State vs. Purdue

Team	1	2	3	4	Total
No. 4 Wildcats	0	7	6	21	34
• Boilermakers	0	17	10	10	37

- Date: December 29
- Location: Alamodome, San Antonio, Texas
- Game attendance: 60,780

Scoring summary
Q2	14:47	Purdue	Daniels 5-yard pass from Brees (Dorsch kick)	Purdue 7–0
Q2	13:03	Purdue	Dorsch 25-yard field goal	Purdue 10–0
Q2	9:49	KSU	McDonald 1-yard pass from Bishop (Gramatica kick)	Purdue 10–7
Q2	8:36	Purdue	Jones 30-yard pass from Brees (Dorsch kick)	Purdue 17–7
Q3	8:06	KSU	Havick recovered fumble in end zone (kick failed)	Purdue 17–13
Q3	0:52	Purdue	Nugent recovered fumble in end zone (Dorsch kick)	Purdue 24–13
Q3	0:04	Purdue	Dorsch 26-yard field goal	Purdue 27–13
Q4	11:59	KSU	Allen 3-yard run (Gramatica kick)	Purdue 27–20
Q4	6:44	Purdue	Dorsch 37-yard field goal	Purdue 30–20
Q4	6:23	KSU	McDonald 88-yard pass from Bishop (Gramatica kick)	Purdue 30–27
Q4	1:24	KSU	Swift 2-yard pass from Bishop (Gramatica kick)	KSU 34–30
Q4	0:30	Purdue	Jones 24-yard pass from Brees (Dorsch kick)	Purdue 37–34

Kansas State had 125 yards in penalties, 7 turnovers, and allowed the Boilermakers to drive 80 yards in only 54 seconds for the game-winning touchdown.

== Roster ==
1998 Kansas State Wildcats football team roster
Players
Coaches
Offense

Pos.	#	Name	Class
RB	32	David Allen	Jr
RB	3	Frank Murphy	Jr
QB	7	Michael Bishop	Sr
QB	18	Jonathan Beasley	So
WR	22	Aaron Lockett	Fr
WR	80	Darnell McDonald	Sr
RB	24	Eric Hickson	Sr
FB	30	Brian Goolsby	Sr
TE	86	Justin Swift	Sr
RG	78	Jeremy Martin	Sr
RT	76	Ryan Young	Sr

Defense

Pos.	#	Name	Class
DL	44	Monty Beisel	So
CB	23	Jerametrius Butler	So
CB	35	Dyshod Carter	So
DB	1	Lamar Chapman	Jr
S	40	Jarrod Cooper	So
DL	49	Darren Howard	Jr
S	38	Jon McGraw	Fr
LB	8	Jeff Kelly	Jr
LB	52	Ben Leber	Fr
LB	50	Travis Ochs	Sr
LB	42	Mark Simoneau	Jr

Special teams

Pos.	#	Name	Class
K	10	Martín Gramática	Sr
P	16	James Garcia	Sr

Head coach

- Bill Snyder

Coordinators/assistant coaches

- Ron Hudson – Offensive Coordinator & quarterbacks
- Michael Smith – Running backs
- Greg Peterson – Wide receivers & passing game coordinator
- Paul Dunn – Offensive line
- Mike Stoops – Defensive coordinator, defensive backs, & assistant head coach
- Mo Latimore – interior Defensive line
- Jon Fabris – Defensive ends
- Brent Venables – Linebackers
- Mark Mangino – Recruiting Game Coordinator

Legend

- (C) Team captain
- (S) Suspended
- (I) Ineligible
- Injured
- Redshirt

== Awards ==
- Bill Snyder – Named Big 12 Coach of the Year, Paul "Bear" Bryant Award, Walter Camp Coach of the Year, AP Coach of the Year, Bobby Dodd Coach of the Year Award
- Michael Bishop – Davey O'Brien Award, Heisman Trophy runner-up, All-American, First-Team All-Big 12
- Jeff Kelly – Consensus All-American, First-Team All-Big 12
- Martín Gramática – Consensus All-American, First-Team All-Big 12
- David Allen – Consensus All-American, First-Team All-Big 12
- Ryan Young – First-Team All-Big 12
- Darnell McDonald – First-Team All-Big 12
- Darren Howard – First-Team All-Big 12
- Jarrod Cooper – First-Team All-Big 12

== Players in the 1999 NFL draft ==
Player	Position	Round	Pick	NFL club	Ref
Martín Gramática	K	3	80	Tampa Bay Buccaneers	
Jeff Kelly	LB	6	198	Atlanta Falcons	
Ryan Young	OT	7	223	New York Jets	
Michael Bishop	QB	7	227	New England Patriots	
Justin Swift	TE	7	238	Denver Broncos	
Darnell McDonald	WR	7	240	Tampa Bay Buccaneers	
