= Kyle Caskey =

American football coach (born 1978)

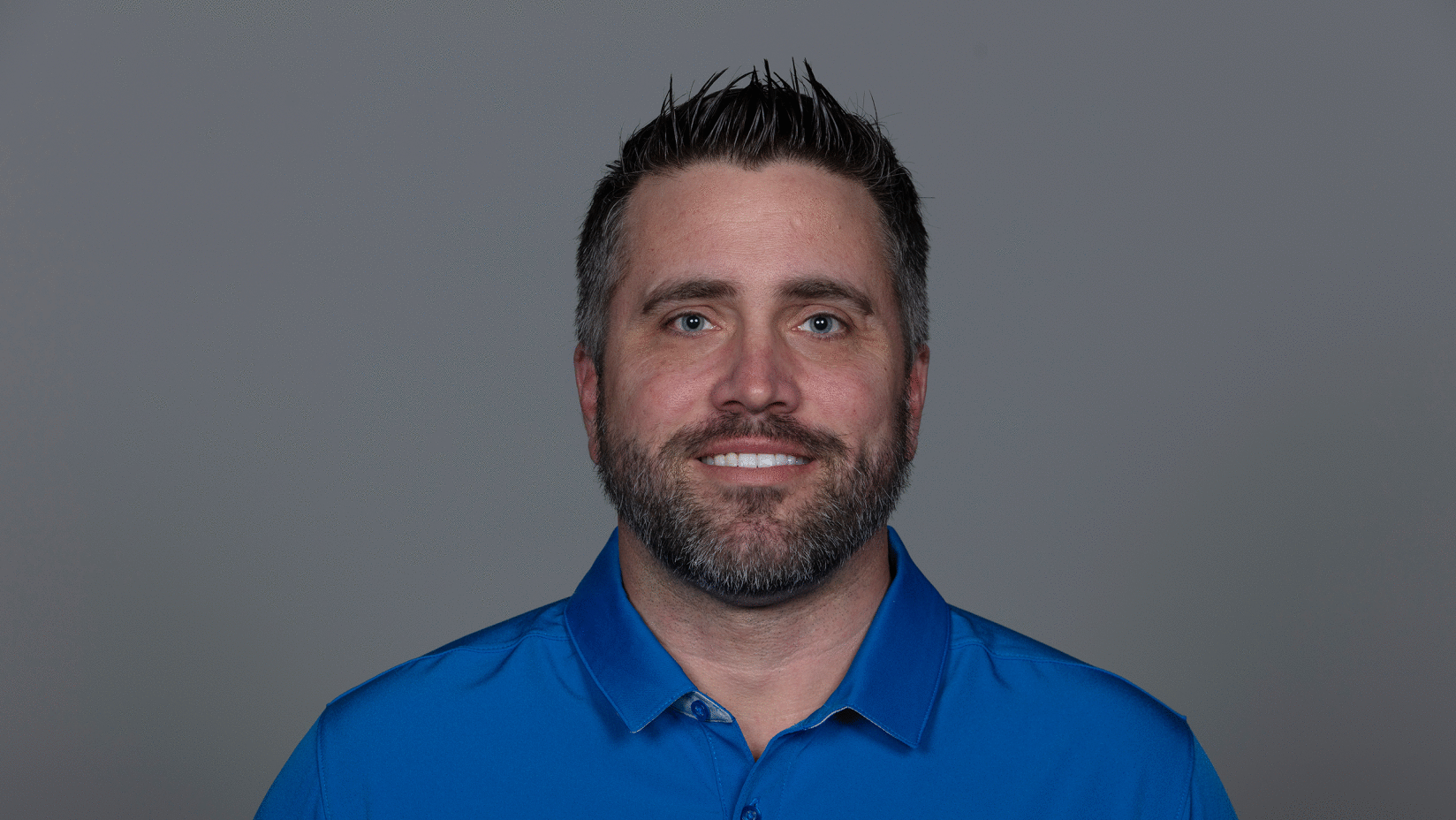

Minnesota Vikings
- Title: Offensive quality control coach

Personal information
- Born: December 7, 1978 (age 47); Bryan, Texas, U.S.
- Listed height: 6 ft 1 in (1.85 m)
- Listed weight: 240 lb (109 kg)

Career information
- High school: Daingerfield (Daingerfield, Texas)
- College: Texas A&M (1997–2002)

Career history
- Louisiana–Monroe (2004–2005) Graduate assistant; Indiana State (2006–2008) Recruiting coordinator; Ole Miss (2009) Defensive assistant; Cincinnati Bengals (2010–2013) Offensive quality control & assistant offensive line coach; Cincinnati Bengals (2014–2018) Running backs coach; Detroit Lions (2019–2020) Running backs coach; Jacksonville Jaguars (2021) Offensive quality control coach; St. Louis Battlehawks (2024–2025) Running backs coach & special teams coordinator; Minnesota Vikings (2026–present) Offensive quality control coach

Kyle Caskey (born December 7, 1978) is an American professional football coach who is an offensive quality control coach for the Minnesota Vikings for the National Football League (NFL). He recently served as the running backs coach and special teams coordinator for the St. Louis Battlehawks of the United Football League (UFL). He has more than 18 years of National Football League (NFL) and college football experience.

== Early life and education ==
Caskey attended Texas A&M University where he played football from 1997 to 1998, and won the Big 12 Championship Game in 1998. Following the 1998 season, he focused his athletic career in track and field from 1999 to 2002, where he competed in discus and earned All-Big 12 honors in 2000.

== Coaching career ==
=== College ===
Caskey began his coaching career as a defensive graduate assistant at Louisiana–Monroe in 2004. From 2006 to 2008 he served as a recruiting coordinator for Indiana State. He then served as an intern at Ole Miss, working with the safeties and quality control in 2009.

On May 20, 2021, he was hired as an offensive analyst for LSU. However, he returned to the NFL before the Tigers' season began.

=== Cincinnati Bengals ===
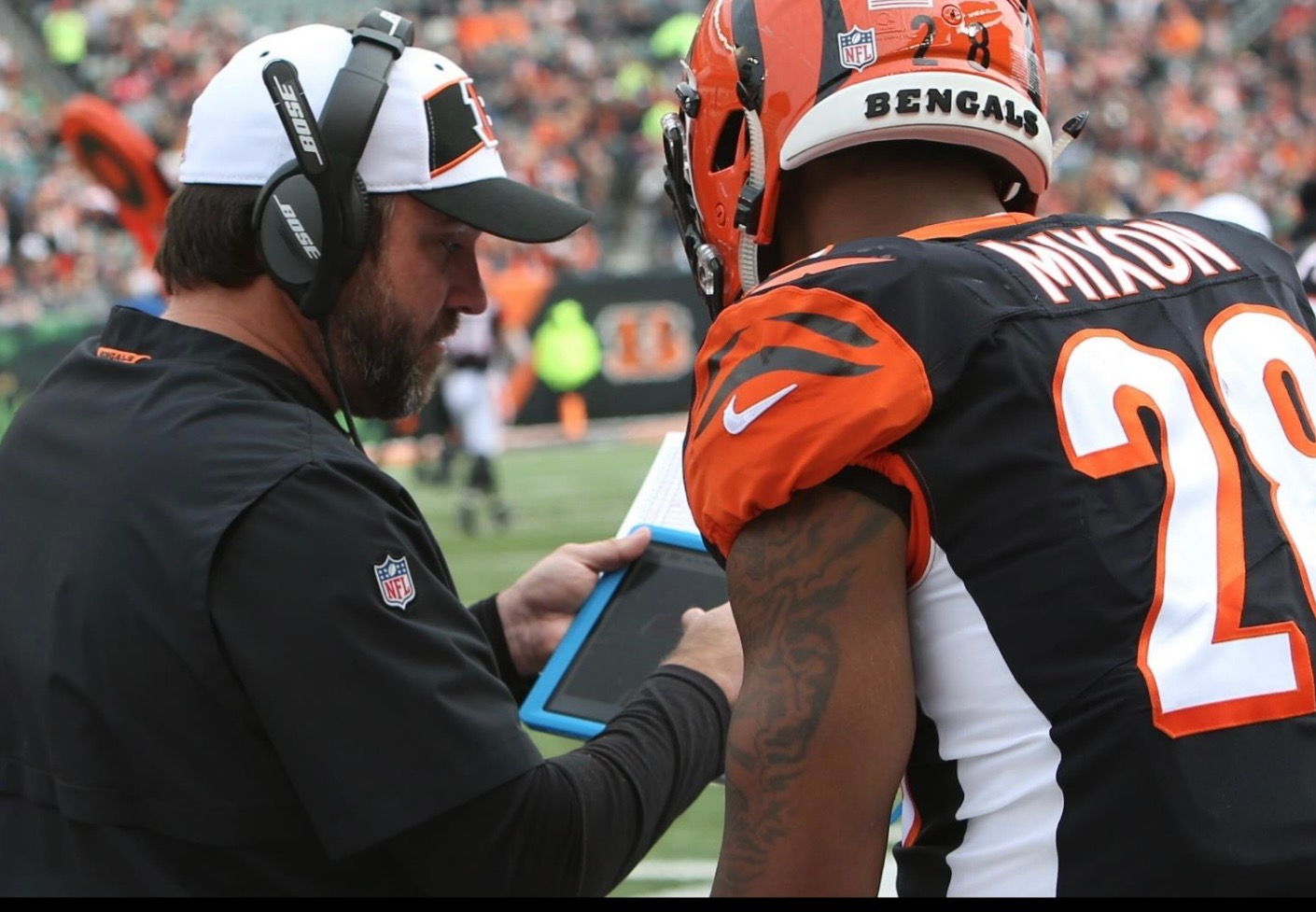
Caskey with the Bengals

On February 25, 2010, Caskey was named offensive quality control coach for the Cincinnati Bengals. On January 10, 2014, Caskey was promoted to running backs coach for the Bengals.

=== Detroit Lions ===
On February 26, 2019, Caskey was named running backs coach for the Detroit Lions. During Caskey's time in Detroit in 2019, the Lions had four running backs rush for at least 200 yards, which was the most in the NFL.

=== Jacksonville Jaguars ===
On September 9, 2021, Caskey was named offensive quality control coach for the Jacksonville Jaguars.

=== St. Louis Battlehawks ===
On February 21, 2024, Caskey was hired by the St. Louis Battlehawks.

=== Minnesota Vikings ===
On February 22, 2026, Caskey was hired to serve as an offensive quality control coach for the Minnesota Vikings.

== Personal life ==
Caskey's father, Bob, played football at Texas A&M from 1958 to 1961. He and his wife, Kayla, have three sons, Olsen, Kolten and Beauden.
