= 1998 Nebraska Cornhuskers football team =

American college football season

1998 Nebraska Cornhuskers football

Holiday Bowl, L 20–23 vs. Arizona
- Conference: Big 12 Conference
- North Division

Ranking
- Coaches: No. 20
- AP: No. 19
- Record: 9–4 (5–3 Big 12)
- Head coach: Frank Solich (1st season)
- Offensive scheme: I formation
- Defensive coordinator: Charlie McBride (18th season)
- Base defense: 4–3
- Home stadium: Memorial Stadium

1998 Big 12 Conference football standings
	Conf.			Overall
Team	W		L	W		L
North Division
No. 10 Kansas State x	8	–	0	11	–	2
No. 19 Nebraska	5	–	3	9	–	4
No. 21 Missouri	5	–	3	8	–	4
Colorado	4	–	4	8	–	4
Kansas	1	–	7	4	–	7
Iowa State	1	–	7	3	–	8
South Division
No. 11 Texas A&M x$	7	–	1	11	–	3
No. 15 Texas	6	–	2	9	–	3
Texas Tech	4	–	4	7	–	5
Oklahoma State	3	–	5	5	–	6
Oklahoma	3	–	5	5	–	6
Baylor	1	–	7	2	–	9
Championship: Texas A&M 36, Kansas State 33
$ – BCS representative as conference champion; x – Division champion/co-champions; Rankings from AP Poll

The 1998 Nebraska Cornhuskers football team represented the University of Nebraska–Lincoln as a member of the North Division of the Big 12 Conference during the 1998 NCAA Division I-A football season. Led by first-year head coach Frank Solich, the Cornhuskers compiled an overall record of 9–4 with a mark of 5–3 in conference play, tying for second place in the Big 12's North Division. Nebraska was invited to the Holiday Bowl, where the Cornhuskers lost to Arizona. The team played home games at Memorial Stadium in Lincoln, Nebraska.

== Schedule ==
Date	Time	Opponent	Rank	Site	TV	Result	Attendance	Source
August 29	3:00 pm	Louisiana Tech*	No. 4	Memorial Stadium; Lincoln, NE (Eddie Robinson Classic)	FSN	W 56–27	76,021	
September 5	12:30 pm	UAB*	No. 4	Memorial Stadium; Lincoln, NE		W 38–7	75,921	
September 12	6:00 pm	at California*	No. 4	California Memorial Stadium; Berkeley, CA	FSN	W 24–3	67,000	
September 26	2:30 pm	No. 9 Washington*	No. 2	Memorial Stadium; Lincoln, NE (College GameDay)	ABC	W 55–7	76,372	
October 3	6:00 pm	vs. Oklahoma State	No. 2	Arrowhead Stadium; Kansas City, MO	FSN	W 24–17	79,555	
October 10	2:30 pm	at No. 18 Texas A&M	No. 2	Kyle Field; College Station, TX	ABC	L 21–28	60,798	
October 17	6:00 pm	Kansas^{†}	No. 8	Memorial Stadium; Lincoln, NE (rivalry)	FSN	W 41–0	76,174	
October 24	11:30 am	No. 19 Missouri	No. 7	Memorial Stadium; Lincoln, NE (rivalry)	FSN	W 20–13	76,425	
October 31	2:30 pm	Texas	No. 7	Memorial Stadium; Lincoln, NE	ABC	L 16–20	76,434	
November 7	1:00 pm	at Iowa State	No. 14	Jack Trice Stadium; Ames, IA (rivalry)		W 42–7	45,817	
November 14	2:30 pm	at No. 2 Kansas State	No. 11	KSU Stadium; Manhattan, KS (rivalry, College GameDay)	ABC	L 30–40	44,298	
November 27	1:30 pm	Colorado	No. 14	Memorial Stadium; Lincoln, NE (rivalry)	ABC	W 16–14	75,958	
December 30	7:30 pm	vs. No. 5 Arizona*	No. 14	Qualcomm Stadium; San Diego, CA (Holiday Bowl)	ESPN	L 20–23	65,354	
*Non-conference game; ^{†}Homecoming; Rankings from AP Poll released prior to the game; All times are in Central time

== Rankings ==
Ranking movements Legend: ██ Increase in ranking ██ Decrease in ranking ( ) = First-place votes
	Week															
Poll	Pre	1	2	3	4	5	6	7	8	9	10	11	12	13	14	Final
AP	4 (4)	4 (2)	3 (1)	2 (1)	2 (7)	2 (1)	8	7	7	14	11	17	14	13	14	19
Coaches	3 (12)	3 (8)	3 (7)	2 (7)	2 (15)	2 (6)	8	7	7	15	11	19	17	17	16	20
BCS	Not released								6	12	11	14	12	11	11	Not released

== Game summaries ==
=== Louisiana Tech ===
Louisiana Tech at Nebraska [box score]

Team	1	2	3	4	Total
Louisiana Tech	0	6	15	6	27
• Nebraska	14	21	7	14	56

- Date: August 29
- Location: Memorial Stadium, Lincoln, Nebraska
- Game attendance: 76,021
- TV announcers (FSN): Ron Thulin, Artie Gigantino and Eric Clemons

=== UAB ===
UAB at Nebraska [box score]

Team	1	2	3	4	Total
UAB	0	7	0	0	7
• Nebraska	7	14	0	17	38

- Date: September 5
- Location: Memorial Stadium, Lincoln, Nebraska
- Game attendance: 75,921

=== California ===
Nebraska at California [box score]

Team	1	2	3	4	Total
• Nebraska	7	7	0	10	24
California	0	0	3	0	3

- Date: September 12
- Location: California Memorial Stadium, Berkeley, California
- Game attendance: 67,000

=== Washington ===
Washington at Nebraska [box score]

Team	1	2	3	4	Total
Washington	0	7	0	0	7
• Nebraska	21	14	20	0	55

- Date: September 26
- Location: Memorial Stadium, Lincoln, Nebraska
- Game attendance: 76,372

=== Oklahoma State ===
Nebraska vs Oklahoma State [box score]

Team	1	2	3	4	Total
• Nebraska	0	3	14	7	24
Oklahoma State	0	3	7	7	17

- Date: October 3
- Location: Arrowhead Stadium, Kansas City, Missouri
- Game attendance: 79,555

=== Texas A&M ===
Nebraska at Texas A&M [box score]

Team	1	2	3	4	Total
Nebraska	0	7	0	14	21
• Texas A&M	7	7	7	7	28

- Date: October 10
- Location: Kyle Field, College Station, Texas
- Game attendance: 60,798

=== Kansas ===
Kansas at Nebraska [box score]

Team	1	2	3	4	Total
Kansas	0	0	0	0	0
• Nebraska	10	7	14	10	41

- Date: October 17
- Location: Memorial Stadium, Lincoln, Nebraska
- Game attendance: 76,174

=== Missouri ===
Missouri at Nebraska [box score]

Team	1	2	3	4	Total
Missouri	0	13	0	0	13
• Nebraska	3	3	7	7	20

- Date: October 24
- Location: Memorial Stadium, Lincoln, Nebraska
- Game attendance: 76,425

=== Texas ===
Texas at Nebraska [box score]

Team	1	2	3	4	Total
• Texas	7	3	0	10	20
Nebraska	0	3	10	3	16

- Date: October 31
- Location: Memorial Stadium, Lincoln, Nebraska
- Game attendance: 76,434

=== Iowa State ===
Nebraska at Iowa State [box score]

Team	1	2	3	4	Total
• Nebraska	7	14	7	14	42
Iowa State	0	0	0	7	7

- Date: November 7
- Location: Jack Trice Stadium, Ames, Iowa
- Game attendance: 45,817

=== Kansas State ===
Nebraska at Kansas State [box score]

Team	1	2	3	4	Total
Nebraska	7	10	7	6	30
• Kansas State	7	7	10	16	40

- Date: November 14
- Location: KSU Stadium, Manhattan, Kansas
- Game attendance: 44,298

=== Colorado ===
Colorado at Nebraska [box score]

Team	1	2	3	4	Total
Colorado	7	0	7	0	14
• Nebraska	7	3	3	3	16

- Date: November 27
- Location: Memorial Stadium, Lincoln, Nebraska
- Game attendance: 75,958

=== Arizona ===
Nebraska vs Arizona [box score]

Team	1	2	3	4	Total
Nebraska	0	13	0	7	20
• Arizona	6	3	0	14	23

- Date: December 30
- Location: Qualcomm Stadium, San Diego
- Game attendance: 65,354

== Personnel ==
=== Roster ===
1998 Nebraska Cornhuskers football team roster
Players
Coaches
Offense

Pos.	#	Name	Class
SE	17	Scott Aguglia	Fr
IB	38	Dan Alexander	So
G	64	Steve Altstadt	RFr
WB	82	Sean Applegate	Jr
C	51	Matt Baldwin	Jr
TE	94	Damien Bauman	Jr
TE	33	Sasho Becvarovski	So
SE	20	Tom Beveridge	So
TE	84	Jon Bowling	Fr
WB	14	Lance Brown	Sr
IB	36	Correll Buckhalter	So
IB	19	Chris Butler	Fr
SE	6	Kenny Cheatham	Sr
QB	11	Joe Chrisman	Fr
QB	9	Monte Christo	Sr
FB	31	Chris Cielocha	Fr
OT	68	Jeff Clausen	Jr
OL	56	Wes Cody	Fr
SE	21	Danny Cork	Fr
WB	89	Ben Cornelsen	RFr
QB	7	Eric Crouch	RFr
TE	86	Will Dabbert	Fr
SE	3	Matt Davison	So
TE	85	T.J. DeBates	Jr
IB	30	Dahrran Diedrick	Fr
OT	76	Billy Diekmann	So
SE	81	Chad Duryea	Fr
OL	72	Kyle Eisenhauer	Fr
IB	4	DeAngelo Evans	So
WB	2	Demond Finister	Jr
SE	83	Craig Fischer	Jr
WB	25	Austin Forster	Fr
OL	77	Joe Freeman	Fr
SE	29	Pat Friesen	Fr
WB	30	Paul Fujan	RFr
OT	74	Lonnie Fulton	Jr
G	72	Ben Gessford	Sr
WB	8	John Gibson	So
TE	99	Aaron Golliday	Fr
FB	46	Nick Gragert	RFr
OT	70	Mike Green	RFr
IB	27	DeAntae Grixby	Fr
QB	13	Sam Gutz	Fr
SE	91	Seth Gutz	Jr
OL	51	Andy Gwennap	Fr
SE	80	Billy Haafke	Sr
SE	7	Troy Hassebroek	Fr
C	78	Aaron Havlovic	Jr
WB	10	Dan Hennings	Fr
C	59	Josh Heskew	Sr
G	55	Russ Hochstein	So
FB	44	Casey Hughes	Fr
TE	88	Sheldon Jackson	Sr
OT	69	Adam Julch	Jr
FB	47	Paul Kastl	Fr
FB	22	Ben Kingston	Jr
SE	9	John Klem	Fr
OL	57	Scott Koethe	Fr
OT	75	Kyle Kollmorgen	RFr
OL	53	David Kolowski	Fr
OL	67	Nate Kolterman	Fr
FB	40	Billy Legate	Sr
QB/WB	1	Frankie London	Jr
SE		Josh Lyman	Fr
FB	45	Joel Makovicka	Sr
WB	35	Shawn McGann	Fr
TE	90	Jake McKee	So
FB	15	Willie Miller	So
TE	43	John Murphy	So
QB	12	Bobby Newcombe	So
FB	37	Hank Piening	So
C	54	Dominic Raiola	RFr
IB	41	Tyler Rauenzahn	Fr
QB	16	Jay Runty	So
G	66	Jon Rutherford	RFr
G	79	Chris Saalfeld	So
OT	65	Jason Schwab	Jr
G	63	James Sherman	Jr
OL	62	Matt Shook	Fr
OL	79	Leif Sidwell	Fr
IB	32	Travis Soucie	So
FB	48	Jeremy Stanislav	So
OT	73	Jim Tansey	Jr
SE	8	Wilson Thomas	Fr
IB	24	Alik Tillery	RFr
FB	31	Tyrone Uhlir	Fr
OL	78	Justin Valencia	Fr
WB	26	Casey Vanderhoef	So
OT	58	Dave Volk	RFr
G	61	Brandt Wade	Sr
IB	34	Dan White	RFr
WB	5	Shevin Wiggins	Sr
OL	50	Mike Wilford	Fr
TE	87	Tracey Wistrom	RFr
OL	52	Steve Ziemba	Fr

Defense

Pos.	#	Name	Class
RE	98	Demoine Adams	Fr
NT	89	Luis Almanzar	So
RCB	28	Josh Anderson	So
WLB	41	Rod Baker	So
ROV	4	Mic Boettner	RFr
FS	14	Dion Booker	RFr
ROV	21	Mike Brown	Jr
RCB	22	Ralph Brown	Jr
MLB	39	Ben Buettenback	Jr
MLB	48	Jamie Burrow	RFr
DL	55	Jon Clanton	Fr
MLB	52	Jon Coyne	Fr
CB	3	Keyuo Craver	Fr
DB	2	Mike Demps	RFr
LB	56	Mason Dutton	Fr
FS	33	Mitch Ebke	So
ROV		John Eisenberg	So
FS	19	Clint Finley	So
ROV	38	Eric Fischer	So
MLB	44	Jay Foreman	Sr
LB	58	Gabe Fries	Fr
SLB	43	Russell Froehlich	Sr
NT	77	Bobby Gill	So
RE	97	Matt Grummert	So
SLB	53	Chris Gustafson	Fr
FS	45	Brad Hamik	So
LCB	18	Jeff Hemje	Fr
SLB	49	Quint Hogrefe	Sr
DL	67	Richard Hughes	Fr
RCB	24	Matt Ickes	RFr
WLB	50	Julius Jackson	Jr
WLB	27	Eric Johnson	Jr
DT	91	Loran Kaiser	So
RE	57	Chad Kelsay	Sr
RE	34	Chris Kelsay	Fr
WLB	47	Josh Kohl	Jr
DB	1	Paul Kosch	Fr
DB	6	Adam Lechtenberg	Fr
ROV	29	Gregg List	Jr
DL	70	Jason Lohr	Fr
RE	86	Jeremy Lyman	Fr
DL	82	Stephen Manning	Fr
DT	69	Matt McGinn	RFr
FS	32	Greg McGraw	Jr
SLB	36	Levi Mehl	RFr
RE	93	Brandon Mooberry	So
DB	7	Christopher Moran	Jr
DT	87	Casey Nelson	Fr
DL	95	Jeff Nelson	Fr
DL	97	Andrew Offner	Fr
SLB	37	Tony Ortiz	Jr
MLB	54	Jon Penny	RFr
RCB	11	Jerome Peterson	Jr
MLB	13	Carlos Polk	So
ROV	10	Brandon Quindt	So
SLB	23	Steve Raymond	Jr
LCB	9	Khari Reynolds	So
RE	85	Kyle Ringenberg	Fr
MLB	40	Brandon Roth	RFr
RE	84	Mike Rucker	Sr
RE	80	Eric Ryan	Jr
LB	4	Scott Shanle	Fr
SLB	46	Brian Shaw	Jr
RE	98	Scott Siebenborn	So
DT	94	Jeremy Slechta	Fr
WLB	13	Jemond Smith	Fr
RE	71	Justin Smith	Fr
LB	52	Luke Smith	Fr
LB	53	Randy Stella	Fr
LCB	16	Erwin Swiney	So
LB	90	Tony Tata	Fr
DB	16	Aaron Terpening	Fr
RE	92	Travis Toline	Sr
RCB	12	Arion Turner	RFr
MLB	51	Chad Tuttle	So
RE	83	Kyle Vanden Bosch	So
WLB	26	Mark Vedral	RFr
ROV	25	Joe Walker	So
RE	94	Brandon Wardyn	So
NT	96	Steve Warren	Jr
FS	42	Troy Watchorn	So
RE	95	J.P. (John Paul) Wichmann	RFr
RE	81	Aaron Wills	Jr
RE	88	Colin Wills	Fr
DT	99	Jason Wiltz	Sr
LCB	20	Wes Woodward	RFr

Special teams

Pos.	#	Name	Class
PK		Josh Brown	Fr
PK	35	Kris Brown	Sr
PK	17	Dan Hadenfeldt	Jr
P	23	Bill Lafleur	Sr
PK	28	Chace Long	So
P	8	Brian Morro	Sr
P/PK	17	Chuck Tack	Fr

Head coach

- Frank Solich
  1st season
  20th year at Nebraska
  Alma mater: Nebraska

Coordinators/assistant coaches

- Charlie McBride
  18th season as DC/DL coach
  22nd year at Nebraska
  Alma mater: Colorado
- Turner Gill
  7th season as QB coach
  7th year at Nebraska
  Alma mater: Nebraska
- Craig Bohl
  4th season as LB coach
  7th year at Nebraska
  Alma mater: Nebraska
- Ron Brown
  12th season as WR/TE coach
  12th year at Nebraska
  Alma mater: Brown
- Dan Young
  16th season as OL/K coach
  16th year at Nebraska
  Alma mater: Reed
- Milt Tenopir
  25th season as OL coach
  25th year at Nebraska
  Alma mater: Sterling
- Nelson Barnes
  2nd season as RE coach
  2nd year at Nebraska
  Alma mater: North Texas
- George Darlington
  DB coach
  26th year at Nebraska
  Alma mater: Rutgers
- Dave Gillespie
  1st season as RB coach
  10th year at Nebraska
  Alma mater: Nebraska-Omaha
- Boyd Epley
  30th season as S&C coach
  30th year at Nebraska
  Alma mater: Nebraska

Legend

- (C) Team captain
- (S) Suspended
- (I) Ineligible
- Injured
- Redshirt

Roster
Last update: January 17, 2011

=== Depth chart ===
Defense

FS
Mike Brown
Clint Finley
Dion Booker
Greg McGraw

WILL	MIKE	SAM
Eric Johnson	Jay Foreman	Tony Ortiz
Julius Jackson	Carlos Polk	Brian Shaw
Josh Kohl	Jamie Burrow	Rod Baker

ROVER
Joe Walker
Mike Brown
Gregg List
Troy Watchorn

CB
Erwin Swiney
Keyuo Craver
Jeff Hemje

DE	DT	DT	DE
Mike Rucker	Jason Wiltz; Steve Warren	Loran Kaiser	Chad Kelsay
Aaron Wills	Jason Lohr	Jeremy Slechta	Kyle Vanden Bosch
Travis Toline	Bobby Gill	Luis Almanzar	J.P. Wichmann

CB
Ralph Brown
Khari Reynolds
Jerome Peterson

Offense

WR
Matt Davison
Kenny Cheatham
Billy Haafke

LT	LG	C	RG	RT
Adam Julch	James Sherman	Josh Heskew	Ben Gessford	Jason Schwab
Kyle Kollmorgan	Dominic Raiola	Dominic Raiola	Russ Hochstein	Dave Volk
Ben Gessford	Jon Rutherford	Matt Baldwin	Brandt Wade	Billy Diekmann

TE
Sheldon Jackson
Tracey Wistrom
T.J DeBates
Damien Bauman

WR
Shevin Wiggins
Lance Brown
Sean Applegate
Frankie London

QB
Bobby Newcombe
Eric Crouch
Monte Christo

RB
Correll Buckhalter
Dan Alexander
DeAngelo Evans (injured)
Dan White

FB
Joel Makovicka
Willie Miller
Billy Legate

Special teams
PK Kris Brown
P Bill Lafleur
KR Shevin Wiggins
PR Joe Walker

== Awards ==
Award	Name(s)
All-American 2nd Team	Sheldon Jackson
All-American 3rd Team	Ralph Brown
All-Big 12 1st team	Ralph Brown, Josh Heskew, Sheldon Jackson, Jay Foreman, Mike Brown, Chad Kelsay
All-Big 12 2nd team	Kris Brown, Mike Rucker, Joe Walker, Bill Lafleur
All-Big 12 3rd team	Shevin Wiggins
All-Big 12 honorable mention	Kenny Cheatham, Matt Davison, Russ Hochstein, Joel Makovicka, Jason Schwab

== NFL and pro players ==
The following Nebraska players who participated in the 1998 season later moved on to the next level and joined a professional or semi-pro team as draftees or free agents.

Name	Team
Demoine Adams	Edmonton Eskimos
Dan Alexander	Tennessee Titans
Josh Brown	Seattle Seahawks
Kris Brown	Pittsburgh Steelers
Mike Brown	Chicago Bears
Ralph Brown	New York Giants
Correll Buckhalter	Philadelphia Eagles
Keyuo Craver	New Orleans Saints
Eric Crouch	St. Louis Rams
Clint Finley	Kansas City Chiefs
Jay Foreman	Buffalo Bills
Aaron Golliday	Scottish Claymores
DeJuan Groce	St. Louis Rams
Russ Hochstein	Tampa Bay Buccaneers
Sheldon Jackson	Buffalo Bills
Eric Johnson	Oakland Raiders
Chad Kelsay	Pittsburgh Steelers
Chris Kelsay	Buffalo Bills
Bill Lafleur	Barcelona Dragons
Joel Makovicka	Arizona Cardinals
Bobby Newcombe	Montreal Alouettes
Tony Ortiz	Scottish Claymores
Carlos Polk	San Diego Chargers
Dominic Raiola	Detroit Lions
Mike Rucker	Carolina Panthers
Scott Shanle	St. Louis Rams
Jeremy Slechta	Philadelphia Eagles
Erwin Swiney	Green Bay Packers
Kyle Vanden Bosch	Arizona Cardinals
Joe Walker	Tennessee Titans
Steve Warren	Green Bay Packers
Jason Wiltz	New York Jets
