= 1998 Colorado Buffaloes football team =

American college football season

1998 Colorado Buffaloes football

Aloha Bowl champion

Aloha Bowl, W 51–43 vs. Oregon
- Conference: Big 12 Conference
- North Division
- Record: 8–4 (4–4 Big 12)
- Head coach: Rick Neuheisel (4th season)
- Offensive coordinator: Karl Dorrell (4th season)
- Offensive scheme: Multiple
- Defensive coordinator: A. J. Christoff (4th season)
- Base defense: 4–3
- MVPs: Darrin Chiaverini; Hannibal Navies
- Captains: Marlon Barnes; Darrin Chiaverini; Hannibal Navies
- Home stadium: Folsom Field

1998 Big 12 Conference football standings
	Conf.			Overall
Team	W		L	W		L
North Division
No. 10 Kansas State x	8	–	0	11	–	2
No. 19 Nebraska	5	–	3	9	–	4
No. 21 Missouri	5	–	3	8	–	4
Colorado	4	–	4	8	–	4
Kansas	1	–	7	4	–	7
Iowa State	1	–	7	3	–	8
South Division
No. 11 Texas A&M x$	7	–	1	11	–	3
No. 15 Texas	6	–	2	9	–	3
Texas Tech	4	–	4	7	–	5
Oklahoma State	3	–	5	5	–	6
Oklahoma	3	–	5	5	–	6
Baylor	1	–	7	2	–	9
Championship: Texas A&M 36, Kansas State 33
$ – BCS representative as conference champion; x – Division champion/co-champions; Rankings from AP Poll

The 1998 Colorado Buffaloes football team represented the University of Colorado at Boulder as a member of the North Division of the Big 12 Conference during the 1998 NCAA Division I FBS football season. Led by Rick Neuheisel in his fourth and final season as head coach, the Buffaloes compiled an overall record of 8–4 in a mark of 4–4 in conference play, placing fourth in the Big 12 North. Colorado was invited to the Aloha Bowl, where the Buffaloes defeated Oregon. The team played home games at Folsom Field in Boulder, Colorado.

Neuheisel departed Colorado in early January for the University of Washington. He was succeeded by Gary Barnett, previously head coach at Northwestern University.

== Schedule ==
Date	Time	Opponent	Rank	Site	TV	Result	Attendance
September 5	8:00 pm	vs. No. 15 Colorado State*		Mile High Stadium; Denver, CO (Rocky Mountain Showdown)	ESPN	W 42–14	76,036
September 12	1:00 pm	Fresno State*	No. 16	Folsom Field; Boulder, CO		W 29–21	42,623
September 19	1:00 pm	Utah State*	No. 15	Folsom Field; Boulder, CO		W 25–6	45,298
September 26	8:15 pm	Baylor^{†}	No. 15	Folsom Field; Boulder, CO	FSN	W 18–16	46,603
October 3	1:30 pm	at Oklahoma	No. 15	Oklahoma Memorial Stadium; Norman, OK	ABC	W 27–25	71,217
October 10	5:00 pm	No. 5 Kansas State	No. 14	Folsom Field; Boulder, CO (rivalry)	FX	L 9–16	51,581
October 17	11:30 am	No. 22 Texas Tech	No. 19	Folsom Field; Boulder, CO	FSN	W 19–17	48,969
October 24	5:00 pm	at Kansas	No. 17	Memorial Stadium; Lawrence, KS	FX	L 17–33	31,600
November 4	10:30 am	at No. 18 Missouri		Faurot Field; Columbia, MO	FSN	L 14–38	57,261
November 14	12:30 pm	Iowa State		Folsom Field; Boulder, CO	PPV	W 37–8	49,438
November 27	12:30 pm	at No. 14 Nebraska		Memorial Stadium; Lincoln, NE (rivalry)	ABC	L 14–16	75,958
December 25	1:30 pm	vs. No. 21 Oregon*		Aloha Stadium; Halawa, HI (Aloha Bowl)	ABC	W 51–43	34,803
*Non-conference game; ^{†}Homecoming; Rankings from AP Poll released prior to the game; All times are in Mountain time

== Roster ==
1998 Colorado Buffaloes football team roster
Players
Coaches
Offense

Pos.	#	Name	Class
WR	6	Darrin Chiaverini	Sr
QB	12	Adam Bledsoe	So
WR	14	Cedric Cormier	Fr
QB	16	Walker Fletcher	Fr
OL	58	Ryan Johanningmeier	Jr
G	62	Chris Morgan	Jr
G	65	Andre Gurode	Fr
G	76	Brad Bedell	Jr
WR	81	Jason Burianek	Fr
TE	89	Daniel Graham	Fr

Defense

Pos.	#	Name	Class
CB	1	Ben Kelly	So
DB	3	Rashidi Barnes	Jr
LB	6	Scott Nemeth	Fr
LB	8	Hannibal Navies	Sr
SS	31	Michael Lewis	Fr
DE	82	Brady McDonnell	So
DT	97	Justin Bannan	Fr

Special teams

Pos.	#	Name	Class

Head coach

- Rick Neuheisel

Coordinators/assistant coaches

Legend

- (C) Team captain
- (S) Suspended
- (I) Ineligible
- Injured
- Redshirt

Roster

== Rankings ==
Ranking movements Legend: ██ Increase in ranking ██ Decrease in ranking — = Not ranked RV = Received votes
	Week															
Poll	Pre	1	2	3	4	5	6	7	8	9	10	11	12	13	14	Final
AP	RV	16	15	15	15	14	19	17	24	—	—	RV	—	—	—	RV
Coaches Poll	RV	16	15	15	15	14	18	17	25	25	—	—	—	—	—	RV
BCS	Not released								—	—	—	—	—	—	—	Not released
