= Sheldon Jackson (disambiguation) =

Sheldon Jackson (1834–1909) was an American Presbyterian minister, missionary and government official

Sheldon Jackson may also refer to:

- Sheldon Jackson (American football) (born 1976), a former tight end for the Buffalo Bills
- Sheldon Jackson (cricketer) (born 1986), an Indian cricketer
- Sheldon Jackson College, a defunct junior college in Sitka, Alaska, named for the missionary
  - Sheldon Jackson Museum, a museum located on the grounds of the former college

== See also ==
- John Green Brady (1847–1918), a disciple of the missionary, he named one of his children Sheldon Jackson Brady
