= 1998 Texas Longhorns football team =

American college football season

1998 Texas Longhorns football

Cotton Bowl Classic champion

Cotton Bowl Classic, W 38–11 vs. Mississippi State
- Conference: Big 12 Conference
- South Division

Ranking
- Coaches: No. 16
- AP: No. 15
- Record: 9–3 (6–2 Big 12)
- Head coach: Mack Brown (1st season)
- Offensive coordinator: Greg Davis (1st season)
- Offensive scheme: Pro-Set
- Defensive coordinator: Carl Reese (1st season)
- Base defense: 4-3
- Home stadium: Darrell K Royal–Texas Memorial Stadium

1998 Big 12 Conference football standings
| | Conf. | | | Overall |
| Team | W | | L | W | | L |
|---|---|---|---|---|---|---|
North Division
| No. 10 Kansas State x | 8 | – | 0 | 11 | – | 2 |
| No. 19 Nebraska | 5 | – | 3 | 9 | – | 4 |
| No. 21 Missouri | 5 | – | 3 | 8 | – | 4 |
| Colorado | 4 | – | 4 | 8 | – | 4 |
| Kansas | 1 | – | 7 | 4 | – | 7 |
| Iowa State | 1 | – | 7 | 3 | – | 8 |
South Division
| No. 11 Texas A&M x$ | 7 | – | 1 | 11 | – | 3 |
| No. 15 Texas | 6 | – | 2 | 9 | – | 3 |
| Texas Tech | 4 | – | 4 | 7 | – | 5 |
| Oklahoma State | 3 | – | 5 | 5 | – | 6 |
| Oklahoma | 3 | – | 5 | 5 | – | 6 |
| Baylor | 1 | – | 7 | 2 | – | 9 |
Championship: Texas A&M 36, Kansas State 33
$ – BCS representative as conference champion; x – Division champion/co-champions; Rankings from AP Poll

The 1998 Texas Longhorns football team represented the University of Texas at Austin as a member South Division of the Big 12 Conference during the 1998 NCAA Division I-A football season. Led by first-year head coach Mack Brown, the Longhorns compiled an overall record of 9–3 with a mark of 6–2 in conference play, placing second in the Big 12's South Division. Texas was invited to the Cotton Bowl Classic, where the Longhorns defeated Mississippi State. The team played home games at Darrell K Royal–Texas Memorial Stadium in Austin, Texas.

Running back Ricky Williams had a sensational senior season, rushing for nine touchdowns and 385 yards in the season's first two games; 318 yards and six touchdowns against Rice; 350 yards and five touchdowns against Iowa State; 150 yards against Nebraska; and 166 yards and two scores against rival Oklahoma. The highlight of the season came when Williams broke the NCAA Division I-A career rushing record during the annual UT-A&M game held the day after Thanksgiving. Needing only 63 yards to break Tony Dorsett's 22-year-old career rushing record (6,082), and having already rushed for 54 yards, Williams broke two tackles, sprinted into open field and received a down field block from receiver Wane McGarity for a 60-yard touchdown run and the record. Williams' record-breaking run gave Texas a 10–0 lead in its eventual upset of sixth-ranked Texas A&M. He finished the game with 295 yards. He also broke the NCAA Division I-A career rushing touchdowns and career scoring records in 1998 with 73 and 452 respectively, and rushed for 200 or more yards in 12 different games, an NCAA record he shares with Ron Dayne and Marcus Allen. Williams won the 64th Heisman Trophy, becoming the second Longhorn to win this honor, joining Earl Campbell.

== Before the season ==
Previous head coach John Mackovic was fired following an disappointing 4-7 season the year prior, which included one of the worst losses in program history; a 66-3 blowout at home by unranked UCLA dubbed "Rout 66". In his place a hiring committee, made up of former head coach Darrell Royal, athletic director Deloss Dodds, former players and important boosters, contacted Brown in December of 1997 about the job. The search for a successor took less than a week.

=== Recruiting class ===
When Brown arrived at Texas he had less than two months to put together the year's recruiting class. The stars of the 1998 class included the Texas City Four (Everick Rawls, Tyrone Jones, Ervis Hill and Jermain Anderson) along with future NFL offensive lineman Mike Williams. The group would eventually lead Texas to a combined 38-13 record over their four years.

1998 Texas recruiting class
| Name | Position | Hometown | School | Height | Weight |
| Jermain Anderson | DE | Texas City | Texas City High School | 6 ft 3 in | 207 lb |
| Beau Baker | OL | Houston | Clear Lake High School | 6 ft 5 in | 265 lb |
| Ahmad Brooks | DB | Abilene | Abilene High School | 5 ft 8 in | 165 lb |
| Adam Dunn | QB | New Caney | New Caney High School | 6 ft 5 in | 245 lb |
| Montrell Flowers | WR | Dallas | Skyline High School | 5 ft 9 in | 175 lb |
| Ervis Hill | DB | Texas City | Texas City High School | 5 ft 9 in | 178 lb |
| Victor Ike | RB | Austin | Bowie High School | 5 ft 11 in | 189 lb |
| Lee Jackson | DB | Longview | Longview High School | 6 ft 3 in | 193 lb |
| Tyrone Jones | LB | Texas City | Texas City High School | 6 ft 4 in | 210 lb |
| Jamal Joyner | DB | Dallas | Dallas Carter High School | 6 ft 2 in | 180 lb |
| Antwan Kirk-Hughes | OT | Waxahachie | Waxahachie High School | 6 ft 3 in | 320 lb |
| Miguel McKay | LB | Lufkin | Lufkin High School | 6 ft 1 in | 231 lb |
| Everick Rawls | LB | Texas City | Texas City High School | 6 ft 1 in | 216 lb |
| Chris Robertson | RB | Denison | Denison High School | 6 ft 1 in | 196 lb |
| Beau Trahan | QB | Bay City | Bay City High School | 5 ft 11 in | 200 lb |
| Marcus Wilkins | LB | Anderson Mill | Westwood High School | 6 ft 2 in | 215 lb |
| Mike Williams | OT | The Colony | The Colony High School | 6 ft 6 in | 339 lb |
| Jon Wyndham | DB | Manor | Manor High School | 6 ft 1 in | 187 lb |

=== Returning starters ===
The Longhorns returned 13 starters from the previous season. They returned 8 on offense and 5 on defense. Ricky Williams had considered forgoing his senior season and declaring for the NFL draft after the firing of coach Mackovic. Williams had managed to win the Doak Walker Award and finish 12th in all-time NCAA rushing in 1997 and was expected to be drafted high. As late as early January 1998, Ricky himself said he was leaning towards going pro, despite having privately decided to stay weeks earlier. He announced his intention to stay on January 8 at a press conference with Mack Brown. Brown embraced Williams and stated "We have just had a successful recruiting class, this is our first signee. He’s the best football player in the country returning next year.” Ricky's decision to stay was a major PR victory for coach Brown, combined with his recruiting success. For Williams, the choice was richly rewarded with a Heisman Trophy and the all-time NCAA rushing record.

The returning offensive starters were: Ben Adams (RG), Octavious Bishop (LT), Ricky Brown (FB), Kwame Cavil (WR), Jay Humphrey (RT), Wane McGarity (WR), Roger Roesler (LG), and Ricky Williams (RB). The returning defensive starters were: Aaron Babino (SS), Anthony Hicks (WLB), Tony Holmes (CB/S), Aaron Humphrey (DE), Donald McCowen (FS), Brandon Nava (SLB), Dusty Renfro (MLB), Chris Smith (DE), and Cedric Woodard (DT).

== Schedule ==
| Date | Time | Opponent | Rank | Site | TV | Result | Attendance | Source |
|---|---|---|---|---|---|---|---|---|
| September 5 | 6:00 p.m. | New Mexico State* | | Darrell K Royal–Texas Memorial Stadium; Austin, TX | PPV | W 66–36 | 75,914 | |
| September 12 | 2:30 p.m. | at No. 6 UCLA* | No. 23 | Rose Bowl; Pasadena, CA | ABC | L 31–49 | 73,070 | |
| September 19 | 2:30 p.m. | at No. 5 Kansas State | | KSU Stadium; Manhattan, KS | ABC | L 7–48 | 43,714 | |
| September 26 | 6:00 p.m. | Rice* | | Darrell K Royal–Texas Memorial Stadium; Austin, TX (rivalry) | FSN | W 59–21 | 71,486 | |
| October 3 | 6:00 p.m. | Iowa State | | Darrell K Royal–Texas Memorial Stadium; Austin, TX | PPV | W 54–33 | 70,681 | |
| October 10 | 11:30 a.m. | vs. Oklahoma | | Cotton Bowl; Dallas, TX (Red River Shootout) | FSN | W 34–3 | 75,587 | |
| October 24 | 6:00 p.m. | Baylor^{†} | | Darrell K Royal–Texas Memorial Stadium; Austin, TX (rivalry) | FX | W 30–20 | 81,437 | |
| October 31 | 2:30 p.m. | at No. 7 Nebraska | | Memorial Stadium; Lincoln, NE | ABC | W 20–16 | 76,434 | |
| November 7 | 2:30 p.m. | Oklahoma State | No. 20 | Darrell K Royal–Texas Memorial Stadium; Austin, TX | ABC | W 37–34 | 81,437 | |
| November 14 | 6:00 p.m. | at Texas Tech | No. 18 | Jones Stadium; Lubbock, TX (rivalry) | FSN | L 35–42 | 50,647 | |
| November 27 | 10:00 a.m. | No. 6 Texas A&M | | Darrell K Royal–Texas Memorial Stadium; Austin, TX (rivalry) | ABC | W 26–24 | 83,687 | |
| January 1, 1999 | 10:00 a.m. | vs. No. 25 Mississippi State* | No. 20 | Cotton Bowl; Dallas, TX (Cotton Bowl Classic) | FOX | W 38–11 | 72,611 | |
*Non-conference game; ^{†}Homecoming; Rankings from AP Poll released prior to the game; All times are in Central time

== Rankings ==
Ranking movements Legend: ██ Increase in ranking ██ Decrease in ranking — = Not ranked RV = Received votes
| | Week | | | | | | | | | | | | | | | |
| Poll | Pre | 1 | 2 | 3 | 4 | 5 | 6 | 7 | 8 | 9 | 10 | 11 | 12 | 13 | 14 | Final |
|---|---|---|---|---|---|---|---|---|---|---|---|---|---|---|---|---|
| AP | RV | 23 | RV | — | — | — | — | — | — | 20 | 18 | 25 | — | 20 | 20 | 15 |
| Coaches Poll | RV | 23 | RV | — | — | — | — | — | — | 23 | 21 | — | — | 23 | 22 | 16 |
| BCS | Not released | | | | | | | | — | 14 | 15 | 23 | — | — | — | Not released |

== Personnel ==
=== Roster ===
1998 Texas Longhorns football team roster
Players
Coaches
Offense

| Pos. | # | Name | Class |
|---|---|---|---|
| WR | 88 | David Aaron | So |
| G | 79 | Ben Adams | Sr |
| C/OG | 62 | Matt Anderson | Fr |
| QB | 11 | Major Applewhite | Fr |
| OL | 68 | Beau Baker | Fr |
| OT | 75 | Octavious Bishop | Sr |
| C | 78 | Marcel Blanchard | So |
| RB | 25 | Michael Boudoin | Sr |
| G | 69 | Corey Bradford | Fr |
| TE | 94 | Chris Breaux | Fr |
| RB | 49 | Zach Brockman | Sr |
| FB | 44 | Ricky Brown | Jr |
| WR | 9 | Kwame Cavil | So |
| QB | 16 | Greg Cicero | Fr |
| WR | 25 | Kevin Cumming | Fr |
| WR | 5 | Eddie Diogu | So |
| QB | 15 | Adam Dunn | Fr |
| RB | 21 | Tony Ellis | So |
| WR | 2 | Montrell Flowers | Fr |
| WR | 4 | Courtnee Garcia | Fr |
| C | 54 | Russell Gaskamp | Sr |
| WR | 86 | Brandon Healy | So |
| G | 74 | Joe Hubbard | So |
| OT | 67 | Jay Humphrey | Sr |
| RB | 32 | Kyle Hunt | Fr |
| RB | 28 | Victor Ike | Fr |
| TE | 80 | Chad Irwin | Fr |
| WR | 19 | Jeremy Jones | Jr |
| G | 76 | Antwan Kirk-Hughes | Fr |
| WR | 23 | Frank Klinkowsky | Fr |
| QB | 14 | Robert Koy | Fr |
| OT | 77 | Richard Land | So |
| TE | 82 | Derek Lewis | Sr |
| WR | 89 | Greg Martinez | So |
| WR | 8 | Wane McGarity | Sr |
| RB | 38 | John Miller | Sr |
| RB | 3 | Hodges Mitchell | So |
| OL | 71 | Robby Nethercut | Fr |
| WR | 22 | Ryan Nunez | Jr |
| QB | 17 | Ryan O'Neill | Sr |
| OT | 66 | Cory Quye | So |
| TE | 83 | Chris Roberts | Jr |
| RB | 37 | Chris Robertson | Fr |
| G | 72 | Roger Roesler | Jr |
| TE | 85 | Derrick Scott | Sr |
| TE | 87 | Chris Smith | Jr |
| RB | 36 | Eric Tasby | Fr |
| WR | 12 | Jamel Thompson | So |
| WR | 18 | Beau Trahan | Fr |
| WR | 27 | Michael Ungar | Fr |
| FB | 3 | Jaime Walker | Fr |
| QB | 10 | Richard Walton | Sr |
| G | 61 | Doug Wheeler | Fr |
| WR | 1 | Bryan White | Sr |
| OT | 63 | Mike Williams | Fr |
| RB | 34 | Ricky Williams | Sr |
| RB | 26 | Chris Wood | Fr |
| G | 65 | Travis Wood | Sr |

Defense

| Pos. | # | Name | Class |
|---|---|---|---|
| DE | 89 | Jermain Anderson | Fr |
| LB | 38 | Aaron Babino | Jr |
| CB | 5 | Brooks Ahmad | Fr |
| S | 22 | Aaron Babino | So |
| CB | 27 | Chris Butcher | Jr |
| DB | 28 | Paul Campion | Fr |
| DT | 90 | Aaron Colvin | Fr |
| DT | 99 | Derrick Curry | So |
| DT | 70 | Leonard Davis | So |
| CB | 26 | Terrol Dillon | Fr |
| LB | 53 | William Edwards | Fr |
| LB | 47 | Scott Emley | Jr |
| LB | 52 | T.J. Fett | Sr |
| DE | 48 | Maurice Gordon | Fr |
| DT | 64 | Casey Hampton | So |
| LB | 55 | Anthony Hicks | Jr |
| CB | 15 | Ervis Hill | Fr |
| DB | 30 | Richard Hightower | Fr |
| CB/S | 31 | Tony Holmes | Sr |
| DE | 49 | Aaron Humphrey | Jr |
| S | 23 | Lee Jackson | Fr |
| S | 6 | Quentin Jammer | So |
| CB | 35 | Levar Jenkins | So |
| DE | 81 | Mike Jones | Fr |
| LB | 39 | Tyrone Jones | Fr |
| DB | 41 | Jamal Joyner | Fr |
| DE | 84 | J.J. Kelly | So |
| LB | 31 | Greg Lauer | So |
| LB | 4 | De'Andre Lewis | Fr |
| DE | 92 | Damon Luckett | Jr |
| LB | 44 | Andrae McClean | Fr |
| S | 7 | Donald McCowen | So |
| LB | 43 | Miguel McKay | Fr |
| DB | 15 | Anish Michael | Fr |
| LB | 30 | Cedric Mitchell | Fr |
| DT | 95 | Gray Moiser | Sr |
| DE | 68 | Colin Muirhead | Sr |
| LB | 56 | Matt Murray | Jr |
| DE | 51 | Brandon Nava | Jr |
| CB | 32 | Chad Patmon | Sr |
| DB | 29 | Jeremiah Phipps | Jr |
| DB | 36 | Brady Pool | Sr |
| LB | 42 | Everick Rawls | Fr |
| LB | 46 | Dusty Renfro | Sr |
| DT | 73 | Shaun Rogers | So |
| LB | 40 | Josh Spoerl | So |
| CB | 17 | Joe Walker | So |
| LB | 16 | Michael Watson | Sr |
| LB | 45 | Marcus Wilkins | Fr |
| DE/DT | 50 | Cedric Woodard | Jr |
| DB | 29 | Jon Wyndham | Fr |

Special teams

| Pos. | # | Name | Class |
|---|---|---|---|
| K | 14 | Jeff Baker | So |
| K/P | 19 | Chris Flores | Jr |
| P | 33 | Ryan Long | So |
| P | 39 | Waylon Martinez | Fr |
| P | 35 | Greg Murray | Jr |
| K/P | 13 | Kris Stockton | So |

Head coach

- Mack Brown

Coordinators/assistant coaches

- Greg Davis–Offensive coordinator
- Carl Reese–Defensive coordinator

Legend

- (C) Team captain
- (S) Suspended
- (I) Ineligible
- Injured
- Redshirt

Roster
Last update: 11/9/25

=== Depth chart ===
Defense

FS
6 Quentin Jammer
⋅

| WILL | MIKE | SAM |
|---|---|---|
| 4 De'Andre Lewis | 46 Dusty Renfro | 38 Aaron Babino |
| ⋅ | ⋅ | ⋅ |

SS
7 Donald McCowen
⋅

CB
15 Ervis Hill
⋅

| DE | DT | DT | DE |
|---|---|---|---|
| 84 J.J. Kelly | 50 Cedric Woodard | 64 Casey Hampton | 49 Aaron Humphrey |
| ⋅ | ⋅ | ⋅ | ⋅ |

CB
17 Joe Walker
⋅

Offense

WR
8 Wane McGarity
1 Bryan White

| LT | LG | C | RG | RT |
|---|---|---|---|---|
| 75 Octavious Bishop | 72 Roger Roesler | 54 Russell Gaskamp | 67 Jay Humphrey | 79 Ben Adams |
| ⋅ | ⋅ | ⋅ | ⋅ | ⋅ |

TE
82 Derek Lewis
⋅

WR
9 Kwame Cavil
⋅

QB
11 Major Applewhite
10 Richard Walton

RB
34 Ricky Williams
3 Hodges Mitchell

FB
44 Ricky Brown
⋅

Special teams
PK 13 Kris Stockton

== Game summaries ==
=== At Kansas State ===
Texas at No. 5 Kansas State

| Team | 1 | 2 | 3 | 4 | Total |
|---|---|---|---|---|---|
| Longhorns | 0 | 0 | 0 | 7 | 7 |
| • Wildcats | 7 | 28 | 0 | 13 | 48 |

- Date: September 18
- Location: KSU Stadium, Manhattan, Kansas
- Game start: 2:30 pm CST
- Game attendance: 44,298
- Game weather: Partly Cloudy; 95 °F (35 °C); wind 22 mph (35 km/h) S
- Referee: Tim Ahlers
- TV announcers (ESPN2): Brad Nessler and Bob Griese

Kansas State welcomed Texas for their first Big 12 Conference matchup, and first meeting since 1942, and Texas' first trip to Manhattan since 1926. 1998 Heisman Trophy winner Ricky Williams was held to just 43 yards on 25 carries for an average of just 1.7 yards per carry. He did not score in the game. Williams averaged 202 rushing yards per game in 1998 and was held to a season low 43 years, his next lowest yardage output was 90 yards against Oklahoma State. K-State racked up 223 yards on the ground on 51 carries and the Wildcats won handily, 48–7.

== Awards and honors ==
- Ricky Williams: Heisman Trophy, Walter Camp Award, Maxwell Award Doak Walker Award, consensus All-American

== 1999 NFL draft ==
The following Texas players were selected in the 1999 NFL draft following the season.

| Player | Position | Round | Pick | Franchise |
|---|---|---|---|---|
| Ricky Williams | Running back | 1 | 5 | New Orleans Saints |
| Wane McGarity | Wide receiver | 4 | 118 | Dallas Cowboys |
| Jay Humphrey | Tackle | 4 | 125 | Minnesota Vikings |
