= 1998 Oklahoma Sooners football team =

American college football season

1998 Oklahoma Sooners football
- Conference: Big 12 Conference
- South Division
- Record: 5–6 (3–5 Big 12)
- Head coach: John Blake (3rd season)
- Offensive coordinator: Joe Dickinson (1st season)
- Offensive scheme: Spread
- Defensive coordinator: Rex Ryan (1st season)
- Base defense: 3–4 or 4–3
- Captain: Game captains
- Home stadium: Oklahoma Memorial Stadium

1998 Big 12 Conference football standings
	Conf.			Overall
Team	W		L	W		L
North Division
No. 10 Kansas State x	8	–	0	11	–	2
No. 19 Nebraska	5	–	3	9	–	4
No. 21 Missouri	5	–	3	8	–	4
Colorado	4	–	4	8	–	4
Kansas	1	–	7	4	–	7
Iowa State	1	–	7	3	–	8
South Division
No. 11 Texas A&M x$	7	–	1	11	–	3
No. 15 Texas	6	–	2	9	–	3
Texas Tech	4	–	4	7	–	5
Oklahoma State	3	–	5	5	–	6
Oklahoma	3	–	5	5	–	6
Baylor	1	–	7	2	–	9
Championship: Texas A&M 36, Kansas State 33
$ – BCS representative as conference champion; x – Division champion/co-champions; Rankings from AP Poll

The 1998 Oklahoma Sooners football team represented the University of Oklahoma during the 1998 NCAA Division I-A football season. The Sooners went 3–5 in Big 12 Conference play, and 5–6 overall. It was the program's last losing season until 2022. As of the 2026 season, this was the last time the Sooners failed to qualify for a bowl game. They played their home games at Oklahoma Memorial Stadium and participated as members of the Big 12 Conference in the South Division. It was John Blake's final season as head coach as he was fired after the end of the regular season and was replaced by Florida defensive coordinator Bob Stoops.

== Schedule ==
Date	Time	Opponent	Site	TV	Result	Attendance
September 5	6:00 p.m.	North Texas*	Oklahoma Memorial Stadium; Norman, OK		W 37–9	72,831
September 12	6:00 p.m.	at TCU*	Amon G. Carter Stadium; Fort Worth, TX		W 10–9	38,256
September 19	6:00 p.m.	California*	Oklahoma Memorial Stadium; Norman, OK	FSN	L 12–13	74,235
October 3	2:30 p.m.	No. 15 Colorado	Oklahoma Memorial Stadium; Norman, OK	ABC	L 25–27	71,217
October 10	11:30 a.m.	vs. Texas	Cotton Bowl; Dallas, TX (Red River Shootout)	FSN	L 3–34	75,587
October 17	1:00 p.m.	at No. 20 Missouri	Faurot Field; Columbia, MO (rivalry)		L 6–20	61,586
October 24	6:00 p.m.	at Oklahoma State	Lewis Field; Stillwater, OK (Bedlam Series)	PPV	L 26–41	50,614
October 31	1:00 p.m.	Iowa State	Oklahoma Memorial Stadium; Norman, OK		W 17–14	70,019
November 7	6:00 p.m.	at No. 7 Texas A&M	Kyle Field; College Station, TX	FX	L 0–29	54,506
November 14	1:00 p.m.	at Baylor	Floyd Casey Stadium; Waco, TX		W 28–16	27,930
November 21	1:00 p.m.	Texas Tech	Oklahoma Memorial Stadium; Norman, OK		W 20–17	65,583
*Non-conference game; Rankings from AP Poll released prior to the game; All times are in Central time

== Roster ==
1998 Oklahoma Sooners football team roster
Players
Coaches
Offense

Pos.	#	Name	Class
OL	63	Jason Bronson	So
QB	8	Brandon Daniels	Jr
OL	69	Brad Davis	Fr
WR	12	Curtis Fagan	Fr
FB	30	Jermaine Fazande	Sr
WR	1	Jarrail Jackson	Jr
TE	81	Chris Hammons	So
FB	35	Seth Littrell	So
OL	78	Stockar McDougle	Jr
RB	31	Josh Norman	Fr
RB	33	De'Mond Parker	Jr
TE	88	Trent Smith	Fr
WR	15	J.T. Thatcher	Fr

Defense

Pos.	#	Name	Class
LB	84	Dale Allen	Sr
DB	28	William Bartee	Jr
WR	24	Chris Blocker	Sr
DT	97	Kelly Gregg	Sr
CB	9	Corey Ivy	Sr
LB	46	Brandon Moore	Fr
LB	38	Roy Williams	Fr
DB	17	Andre Woolfolk	Fr

Special teams

Pos.	#	Name	Class

Head coach

- John Blake

Coordinators/assistant coaches

- Joe Dickinson – Offensive coordinator
- Keith Thomas – Running backs
- Clarence James – Wide receivers
- Sam Pittman – Offensive line
- Rex Ryan – Defensive coordinator
- Chuck Langston – Defensive line & tight ends
- George Barlow – Linebackers
- Pete McGinnis – Linebackers & special teams coordinator
- Phil Bennett – Defensive backs

Legend

- (C) Team captain
- (S) Suspended
- (I) Ineligible
- Injured
- Redshirt

Roster

== After the season ==
=== Awards ===
- All-Big 12: DT Kelly Gregg

=== 1999 NFL draft ===
The 1999 NFL draft was held at the Theatre at Madison Square Garden in New York City on April 17–18, 1999. The following Oklahoma players were either selected or signed as free agents following the draft.

Round	Pick	Player	Position	NFL team
2	60	Jermaine Fazande	Running back	San Diego Chargers
5	159	De'Mond Parker	Running back	Green Bay Packers
6	173	Kelly Gregg	Defensive tackle	Cincinnati Bengals
