= 1998 Kansas Jayhawks football team =

American college football season

1998 Kansas Jayhawks football
- Conference: Big 12 Conference
- North Division
- Record: 4–7 (1–7 Big 12)
- Head coach: Terry Allen (2nd season)
- Offensive coordinator: Bill Salmon (2nd season)
- Defensive coordinator: Ardell Wiegandt (2nd season)
- Home stadium: Memorial Stadium

1998 Big 12 Conference football standings
| | Conf. | | | Overall |
| Team | W | | L | W | | L |
|---|---|---|---|---|---|---|
North Division
| No. 10 Kansas State x | 8 | – | 0 | 11 | – | 2 |
| No. 19 Nebraska | 5 | – | 3 | 9 | – | 4 |
| No. 21 Missouri | 5 | – | 3 | 8 | – | 4 |
| Colorado | 4 | – | 4 | 8 | – | 4 |
| Kansas | 1 | – | 7 | 4 | – | 7 |
| Iowa State | 1 | – | 7 | 3 | – | 8 |
South Division
| No. 11 Texas A&M x$ | 7 | – | 1 | 11 | – | 3 |
| No. 15 Texas | 6 | – | 2 | 9 | – | 3 |
| Texas Tech | 4 | – | 4 | 7 | – | 5 |
| Oklahoma State | 3 | – | 5 | 5 | – | 6 |
| Oklahoma | 3 | – | 5 | 5 | – | 6 |
| Baylor | 1 | – | 7 | 2 | – | 9 |
Championship: Texas A&M 36, Kansas State 33
$ – BCS representative as conference champion; x – Division champion/co-champions; Rankings from AP Poll

The 1998 Kansas Jayhawks football team represented the University of Kansas as a member of the North Division of the Big 12 Conference during the 1998 NCAA Division I-A football season. Led by second-year head coach Terry Allen, the Jayhawks compiled an overall record of 4–7 with a mark of 1–7 in conference play, tying for fifth place at the bottom of the Big 12's North Division standings. The team played home games at Memorial Stadium in Lawrence, Kansas.

== Schedule ==
| Date | Time | Opponent | Site | TV | Result | Attendance | Source |
|---|---|---|---|---|---|---|---|
| September 5 | 2:30 p.m. | Oklahoma State | Memorial Stadium; Lawrence, KS | ABC | L 28–38 | 32,500 | |
| September 12 | 2:30 p.m. | at No. 25 Missouri | Faurot Field; Columbia, MO (Border War) | ABC | L 23–41 | 59,270 | |
| September 19 | 6:30 p.m. | Illinois State* | Memorial Stadium; Lawrence, KS | | W 63–21 | 31,100 | |
| September 26 | 6:00 p.m. | at UAB* | Legion Field; Birmingham, AL | | W 39–37 ^{4OT} | 30,543 | |
| October 3 | 11:30 a.m. | No. 18 Texas A&M | Memorial Stadium; Lawrence, KS | FSN | L 21–24 | 36,000 | |
| October 10 | 6:00 p.m. | at Baylor | Floyd Casey Stadium; Waco, TX | | L 24–31 | 31,271 | |
| October 17 | 6:00 p.m. | at No. 8 Nebraska | Memorial Stadium; Lincoln, NE (rivalry) | FSN | L 0–41 | 76,174 | |
| October 24 | 6:00 p.m. | No. 17 Colorado^{†} | Memorial Stadium; Lawrence, KS | FX | W 33–17 | 31,600 | |
| October 31 | 11:30 a.m. | No. 3 Kansas State | Memorial Stadium; Lawrence, KS (Sunflower Showdown) | FSN | L 6–54 | 43,000 | |
| November 7 | 1:00 p.m. | North Texas* | Memorial Stadium; Lawrence, KS | | W 23–14 | 20,000 | |
| November 21 | 1:00 p.m. | at Iowa State | Jack Trice Stadium; Ames, IA | | L 20–23 | 26,059 | |
*Non-conference game; ^{†}Homecoming; Rankings from AP Poll released prior to the game; All times are in Central time
