= John Blake (American football) =

American football player and coach (1961–2020)

Biographical details
- Born: March 6, 1961; Rockford, Illinois, U.S.
- Died: July 23, 2020 (aged 59); Dallas, Texas, U.S.

Playing career
- 1979–1982: Oklahoma
- Position: Nose guard

Coaching career (HC unless noted)
- 1987–1988: Tulsa (TE/WR)
- 1989: Oklahoma (DL)
- 1990–1992: Oklahoma (LB)
- 1993–1995: Dallas Cowboys (DL)
- 1996–1998: Oklahoma
- 2003: Mississippi State (DL)
- 2004–2006: Nebraska (DL)
- 2007–2010: North Carolina (DL)
- 2016: Buffalo Bills (DL)

Head coaching record
- Overall: 12–22

John Fitzgerald Blake (March 6, 1961 – July 23, 2020) was an American college and professional football coach. He played college football as a nose guard for the Oklahoma Sooners. He served as the head coach of the Sooners from 1996 to 1998.

== Coaching career ==
Blake served as the head coach for the Oklahoma Sooners from 1996 to 1998, succeeding the one-year term of Howard Schnellenberger. He compiled a career record of 12–22, which is the worst three-year stretch in University of Oklahoma football history. Despite his overall record as college head coach, Blake was a great recruiter, bringing in more than half of the 2000 championship team's 22 starters, including future NFL players like safety Roy Williams and linebacker Rocky Calmus.

Prior to his arrival in Norman, Blake had served as the defensive line coach for the Dallas Cowboys, working alongside future UNC coach Butch Davis as well as former Sooner and then Cowboys head coach Barry Switzer. The Dallas Cowboys won two Super Bowls during Blake's stint. Blake also worked as a defensive assistant at Oklahoma in the early 1990s under Gary Gibbs.

Blake served as the defensive line coach at Mississippi State University in 2003. He later held the same position on Bill Callahan's staff at the University of Nebraska–Lincoln from 2004 to 2006. Blake resigned his position at the University of North Carolina at Chapel Hill on Sunday, September 5, 2010. On February 16, 2016 Lamar University announced that they had hired Blake to serve as their defensive line coach. After one month at Lamar and during the Cardinals' spring camp, Blake accepted the defensive line coach position with the Buffalo Bills on March 15, 2016, following the Bills' firing of Karl Dunbar.

== Controversies ==
Blake was involved in a controversy towards the end of his tenure as defense line coach for the Dallas Cowboys. According to The New York Times, Blake made claims to head coach Barry Switzer that Hall of Fame quarterback Troy Aikman treated his black teammates differently and was a racist. In response to this, many members of the Cowboys organization, including black coaches and players, came to the defense of the quarterback. Michael Irvin, Emmitt Smith, and Charles Haley went on the record to stand by Aikman. Aikman also asked a number of black players, including Deion Sanders and Darren Woodson, if there was a problem, and they said there wasn't one. Blake was dismissed from his position with the Cowboys to begin serving as head coach at Oklahoma.

In 2010, Blake resigned from North Carolina in the midst of an investigation into players' relationships with agent Gary Wichard, who died of pancreatic cancer in 2011. At the time, Blake was suspected of being an employee and receiving cash benefits from Wichard. Blake denied all allegations, and said he was secretive about his communications with Wichard because he did not want to reveal his friend's then-secret cancer diagnosis. On March 12, 2012, the NCAA announced that Blake had received a three-year show-cause penalty, which effectively barred him from college coaching during that period. The NCAA determined that Blake had received personal loans from Wichard and failed to disclose them to UNC, and also misled NCAA investigators.

== Death ==
Blake died on the morning of July 23, 2020 at the age of 59. He suffered a heart attack while walking near his home and was transported to Baylor University Medical Center where he was pronounced dead.

== Head coaching record ==
Year	Team	Overall	Conference	Standing
Oklahoma Sooners (Big 12 Conference) (1996–1998)
1996	Oklahoma	3–8	3–5	4th (South)
1997	Oklahoma	4–8	2–6	T–4th (South)
1998	Oklahoma	5–6	3–5	T–4th (South)
Oklahoma:		12–22	7–17	
Total:		12–22		
