= 1998 Texas A&M Aggies football team =

American college football season

1998 Texas A&M Aggies football

Big 12 champion Big 12 South Division champion

Big 12 Championship Game, W 36–33^{2OT} vs. Kansas State

Sugar Bowl, L 14–24 vs. Ohio State
- Conference: Big 12 Conference
- South Division

Ranking
- Coaches: No. 13
- AP: No. 11
- Record: 11–3 (7–1 Big 12)
- Head coach: R. C. Slocum (10th season)
- Offensive coordinator: Steve Kragthorpe (1st season)
- Offensive scheme: Pro-style
- Defensive coordinator: Mike Hankwitz (2nd season)
- Base defense: 4–3
- Home stadium: Kyle Field

1998 Big 12 Conference football standings
	Conf.			Overall
Team	W		L	W		L
North Division
No. 10 Kansas State x	8	–	0	11	–	2
No. 19 Nebraska	5	–	3	9	–	4
No. 21 Missouri	5	–	3	8	–	4
Colorado	4	–	4	8	–	4
Kansas	1	–	7	4	–	7
Iowa State	1	–	7	3	–	8
South Division
No. 11 Texas A&M x$	7	–	1	11	–	3
No. 15 Texas	6	–	2	9	–	3
Texas Tech	4	–	4	7	–	5
Oklahoma State	3	–	5	5	–	6
Oklahoma	3	–	5	5	–	6
Baylor	1	–	7	2	–	9
Championship: Texas A&M 36, Kansas State 33
$ – BCS representative as conference champion; x – Division champion/co-champions; Rankings from AP Poll

The 1998 Texas A&M Aggies football team represented Texas A&M University as a member of the South Division of the Big 12 Conference during the 1998 NCAA Division I-A football season. Led by tenth-year head coach R. C. Slocum, the Aggies compiled an overall record of 11–3 with a mark of 7–1 in conference play, winning the Big 12's South Division title for the second consecutive season. Texas A&M advanced to the Big 12 Championship Game, where the Aggies defeated Kansas State to capture the Big 12 crown. Texas A&M was then invited to the Sugar Bowl, losing there to Ohio State. The team played home games at Kyle Field in College Station, Texas.

== Schedule ==
Date	Time	Opponent	Rank	Site	TV	Result	Attendance	Source
August 31	7:00 pm	vs. No. 2 Florida State*	No. 14	Giants Stadium; East Rutherford, NJ (Kickoff Classic)	ABC	L 14–23	59,232	
September 12	7:30 pm	Louisiana Tech*	No. 18	Kyle Field; College Station, TX		W 28–7 ^{A}	55,073	
September 19	1:00 pm	at Southern Miss*	No. 17	M. M. Roberts Stadium; Hattiesburg, MS	FSNSW	W 24–6	33,233	
September 26	7:30 pm	North Texas*	No. 17	Kyle Field; College Station, TX		W 28–9	56,072	
October 3	11:30 am	at Kansas	No. 18	Memorial Stadium; Lawrence, KS	FSN	W 24–21	36,000	
October 10	2:30 pm	No. 2 Nebraska	No. 18	Kyle Field; College Station, TX	ABC	W 28–21	60,798	
October 17	6:00 pm	at Baylor	No. 10	Floyd Casey Stadium; Waco, TX (Battle of the Brazos)	FSN	W 35–14	42,333	
October 24	2:30 pm	No. 25 Texas Tech	No. 8	Kyle Field; College Station, TX (rivalry)	ABC	W 17–10	62,873	
October 31	6:00 pm	at Oklahoma State	No. 8	Lewis Field; Stillwater, OK	FSN	W 17–6	47,250	
November 7	6:00 pm	Oklahoma	No. 7	Kyle Field; College Station, TX	FX	W 29–0	54,506	
November 14	11:30 am	No. 13 Missouri	No. 6	Kyle Field; College Station, TX	FSN	W 17–14	60,433	
November 27	11:00 am	at Texas	No. 6	Darrell K Royal–Texas Memorial Stadium; Austin, TX (rivalry)	ABC	L 24–26	83,687	
December 5	2:30 pm	vs. No. 2 Kansas State	No. 10	Trans World Dome; St. Louis, MO (Big 12 Championship)	ABC	W 36–33 ^{2OT}	60,798	
January 1	7:00 pm	vs. No. 3 Ohio State*	No. 8	Louisiana Superdome; New Orleans, LA (Sugar Bowl)	ABC	L 14–24	76,502	
*Non-conference game; Rankings from AP Poll released prior to the game; All times are in Central time

- ^A Win forfeited due to ineligible player.

== Rankings ==
Ranking movements Legend: ██ Increase in ranking ██ Decrease in ranking
	Week															
Poll	Pre	1	2	3	4	5	6	7	8	9	10	11	12	13	14	Final
AP	14	18	17	17	18	18	10	8	8	7	6	6	6	10	8	11
Coaches Poll	15	19	18	18	19	18	13	10	9	8	8	7	6	10	9	13
BCS	Not released								8	7	6	6	5	8	6	Not released

== Game summaries ==
=== Florida State ===
	1	2	3	4	Total
#14 Texas A&M	0	14	0	0	14
#2 Florida State	10	0	10	3	23

=== Louisiana Tech ===
	1	2	3	4	Total
Louisiana Tech	0	0	7	0	7
#18 Texas A&M	3	10	15	0	28

Texas A&M's 28–7 win over Louisiana Tech was forfeited on September 23 after Aggie running back D'Andre Hardeman was discovered to have been academically ineligible. Since Hardeman had played in the first two games of the 1998 season, he was disqualified from playing for the remainder of the year.

=== Southern Miss ===
	1	2	3	4	Total
#17 Texas A&M	3	11	7	3	24
Southern Miss	0	0	0	6	6

=== North Texas ===
	1	2	3	4	Total
North Texas	0	3	0	6	9
#17 Texas A&M	7	7	7	7	28

=== Kansas ===
	1	2	3	4	Total
#18 Texas A&M	14	0	3	7	24
Kansas	7	0	7	7	21

Dante Hall rushes for 177 yards.

=== Nebraska ===
	1	2	3	4	Total
#2 Nebraska	0	7	0	14	21
#18 Texas A&M	7	7	7	7	28

This game began the Aggies' annual Maroon Out tradition. A&M scored a dramatic upset at home over undefeated Nebraska. Two 100-yard rushers for the Aggies in Dante Hall(113) and Ja’mar Toombs(110).

=== Baylor ===
	1	2	3	4	Total
#10 Texas A&M	7	7	7	14	35
Baylor	0	0	7	7	14

=== Texas Tech ===
	1	2	3	4	Total
#25 Texas Tech	3	7	0	0	10
#8 Texas A&M	7	7	0	3	17

=== Oklahoma State ===
	1	2	3	4	Total
#8 Texas A&M	0	10	7	0	17
Oklahoma State	3	3	0	0	6

=== Oklahoma ===
	1	2	3	4	Total
Oklahoma	0	0	0	0	0
#7 Texas A&M	7	6	3	13	29

=== Missouri ===
	1	2	3	4	Total
#13 Missouri	0	7	0	7	14
#6 Texas A&M	0	6	0	11	17

=== Texas ===
	1	2	3	4	Total
#6 Texas A&M	0	7	0	17	24
Texas	10	6	0	10	26

=== Kansas State ===
#2 Kansas State vs. #10 Texas A&M

Team	1	2	3	4	OT	2OT	Total
Wildcats	10	7	10	0	3	3	33
• Aggies	0	6	6	15	3	6	36

- Date: December 5
- Location: Trans World Dome, St. Louis, Missouri
- Game start: 2:30 p.m. CST
- Game attendance: 60,798
- Referee: Randy Cristal

Scoring summary
Q1	6:31	KSU	Martin Gramatica 47-yard field goal	KSU 3–0
Q1	2:02	KSU	Justin Swift 15-yard pass from Michael Bishop (Gramatica kick)	KSU 10–0
Q2	11:00	A&M	Russell Bynum 25-yard field goal	KSU 10–3
Q2	10:37	KSU	Darnell McDonald 66-yard pass from Michael Bishop (Gramatica kick)	KSU 17–3
Q2	4:16	A&M	Russell Bynum 26-yard field goal	KSU 17–6
Q3	8:42	A&M	Ja'Mar Toombs 2-yard run (pass failed)	KSU 17–12
Q3	4:31	KSU	Martin Gramatica 45-yard field goal	KSU 20–12
Q3	4:31	KSU	Michael Bishop 5-yard run (Gramatica kick)	KSU 27–12
Q4	9:20	A&M	Leroy Hodge 13-yard pass from Branndon Stewart (Bynum kick)	KSU 27–19
Q4	1:05	A&M	Sirr Parker 9-yard pass from Branndon Stewart (Parker pass from Stewart)	Tied 27–27
OT		A&M	Russell Bynum 18-yard field goal	A&M 30–27
OT		KSU	Martin Gramatica 22-yard field goal	Tied 30–30
2OT		KSU	Martin Gramatica 22-yard field goal	KSU 33–30
2OT		A&M	Sirr Parker 32-yard pass from Branndon Stewart	A&M 36–33

=== Ohio State ===
	1	2	3	4	Total
#3 Ohio State	21	3	0	0	24
#9 Texas A&M	7	0	7	0	14

== Roster ==
1998 Texas A&M Aggies football team roster
Players
Coaches
Offense

Pos.	#	Name	Class
QB	7	Branndon Stewart	Sr
RB	8	Sirr Parker	Sr
QB	15	Randy McCown	Jr
RB	28	Ja'Mar Toombs	Fr
RB	32	Burnest Rhodes	So
RB	34	Dante Hall	Jr
WR	42	Chris Taylor	So
OL	62	Semisi Heimuli	So
OL	71	Chris Valetta	Fr
OL	73	Cameron Spikes	Jr
OL	77	Seth McKinney	So
OL	78	Andy Vincent	Jr
OL	79	Shea Holder	Jr
WR	80	Chris Cole	Jr
WR	81	Matt Bumgardner	So
TE	87	Derrick Spiller	Sr
WR	88	Leroy Hodge	Jr
TE	89	Dan Campbell	Sr

Defense

Pos.	#	Name	Class
SS	1	Michael Jameson	So
OLB	2	Christian Rodriguez	Fr
ILB	9	Dat Nguyen	Sr
CB	18	Sedrick Curry	So
OLB	23	Jason Glenn	So
SS	25	Nate Wallace	Jr
CB	26	Jay Brooks	Fr
FS	30	Brandon Jennings	Jr
CB	39	Jason Webster	Jr
OLB	40	Roylin Bradley	So
OLB	43	Warrick Holdman	Sr
OLB	44	Sean Coryatt	Jr
ILB	46	Cornelius Anthony	So
DL	92	Mike Kazmierski	Jr
DE	95	Rocky Bernard	So
DE	97	Lonnie Madison	Fr
DT	96	Ron Edwards	So
DE	99	Ronald Flemons	So

Special teams

Pos.	#	Name	Class
P	6	Shane Lechler	Jr
PK	37	Russell Bynum	So

Head coach

- R. C. Slocum (10th season)

Coordinators/assistant coaches

- Steve Kragthorpe (offensive coordinator)
- Mike Hankwitz (defensive coordinator)

Legend

- (C) Team captain
- (S) Suspended
- (I) Ineligible
- Injured
- Redshirt

Roster
