= 1998 Independence Bowl =

1998 Sanford Independence Bowl
- Bowl Game
Texas Tech Red Raiders	Ole Miss Rebels
(7–4)	(6–5)
Big 12	SEC
18	35
Head coach: Spike Dykes	Head coach: David Cutcliffe (interim)
	1	2	3	4	Total
Texas Tech	7	3	0	8	18
Ole Miss	7	7	0	21	35
- Date: December 28, 1998
- Season: 1998
- Stadium: Independence Stadium
- Location: Shreveport, Louisiana
- MVP: QB Romaro Miller; DL Kendrick Clancy
- Referee: Gordon Riese (Pac-10)
- Attendance: 46,682

United States TV coverage
- Network: ESPN
- Announcers: Dave Barnett, Bill Curry and Dave Ryan

The 1998 Independence Bowl was a college football postseason bowl game between the Ole Miss Rebels and the Texas Tech Red Raiders.

== Background ==
The Rebels had plummeted to fourth in the SEC West after losing their last three games, including one to Mississippi State in the Egg Bowl. Tuberville left the team prior to the bowl game for Auburn, leaving the coaching duties to David Cutcliffe, hired on December 2. Meanwhile, the Red Raiders were third in the Big 12 South Division after losing four of their last five games. This was the first Independence Bowl for both teams since 1986, which Mississippi won, 20-17. This was the first Independence Bowl featuring a Big 12 team, and the first to be sponsored by Sanford, a leading manufacturer and marketer of writing instruments.

== Game summary ==
=== First quarter ===
- Texas Tech: Dorris 22 pass from Peters (Birkholz kick) – 7–0 Texas Tech
- Ole Miss: Lucas 33 pass from Miller (McGee kick) – 7–7 tie

=== Second quarter ===
- Ole Miss: McAllister 32 pass from Miller (McGee kick) – 14–7 Ole Miss
- Texas Tech: Birkholz 49 field goal – 14–10 Ole Miss

=== Fourth quarter ===
- Ole Miss: Peterson 26 pass from Miller (McGee kick) – 21–10 Ole Miss
- Ole Miss: McAllister 4 run (McGee kick) – 28–10 Ole Miss
- Ole Miss: McAllister 43 kickoff return (McGee kick) – 35–10 Ole Miss
- Texas Tech: McCullar fumble recovery for a touchdown (Winn pass) – 35–18 Ole Miss

== Aftermath ==
The Rebels returned to the Independence Bowl the following year. The Red Raiders wouldn't return to the Independence Bowl until 2023.

In an adjacent development, Tuberville would end up coaching Texas Tech from 2010−12.

== Statistics ==
Statistics	Ole Miss	Texas Tech
First downs	19	18
Rushing yards	139	82
Passing yards	216	203
Interceptions	1	2
Total yards	355	285
Fumbles–lost	3–2	2–1
Penalties–yards	7–86	5–55
Punts–average	5–32.4	6–30.8
