= 1998 Iowa State Cyclones football team =

American college football season

1998 Iowa State Cyclones football
- Conference: Big 12 Conference
- North Division
- Record: 3–8 (1–7 Big 12)
- Head coach: Dan McCarney (4th season)
- Offensive coordinator: Pete Hoener (1st season)
- Offensive scheme: Pro-style
- Defensive coordinator: John Skladany (2nd season)
- Base defense: 4–3
- Home stadium: Jack Trice Stadium

1998 Big 12 Conference football standings
	Conf.			Overall
Team	W		L	W		L
North Division
No. 10 Kansas State x	8	–	0	11	–	2
No. 19 Nebraska	5	–	3	9	–	4
No. 21 Missouri	5	–	3	8	–	4
Colorado	4	–	4	8	–	4
Kansas	1	–	7	4	–	7
Iowa State	1	–	7	3	–	8
South Division
No. 11 Texas A&M x$	7	–	1	11	–	3
No. 15 Texas	6	–	2	9	–	3
Texas Tech	4	–	4	7	–	5
Oklahoma State	3	–	5	5	–	6
Oklahoma	3	–	5	5	–	6
Baylor	1	–	7	2	–	9
Championship: Texas A&M 36, Kansas State 33
$ – BCS representative as conference champion; x – Division champion/co-champions; Rankings from AP Poll

The 1998 Iowa State Cyclones football team represented Iowa State University as a member of the North Division in the Big 12 Conference during the 1998 NCAA Division I-A football season. Led by fourth-year head coach Dan McCarney, the Cyclones compiled an overall record of 3–8 with a mark of 1–7 in conference play, tying for fifth place at the bottom Big 12 North Division standings. Iowa State played home games at Jack Trice Stadium in Ames, Iowa.

== Schedule ==
Date	Time	Opponent	Site	TV	Result	Attendance
September 5	11:30 a.m.	TCU*	Jack Trice Stadium; Ames, IA	FSN	L 21–31	33,009
September 12	11:00 a.m.	at Iowa*	Kinnick Stadium; Iowa City, IA (rivalry)	ESPN2	W 27–9	70,397
September 19	1:00 p.m.	Ball State*	Jack Trice Stadium; Ames, IA		W 38–0	33,634
September 26	11:30 a.m.	Texas Tech	Jack Trice Stadium; Ames, IA	FSN	L 16–28	41,691
October 3	6:00 p.m.	at Texas	Darrell K Royal–Texas Memorial Stadium; Austin, TX	PPV	L 33–54	70,681
October 10	1:00 p.m.	No. 21 Missouri^{†}	Jack Trice Stadium; Ames, IA (rivalry)		L 19–35	38,756
October 24	1:10 p.m.	at No. 4 Kansas State	KSU Stadium; Manhattan, KS (rivalry)		L 7–52	43,203
October 31	1:00 p.m.	at Oklahoma	Oklahoma Memorial Stadium; Norman, OK		L 14–17	70,019
November 7	1:00 p.m.	No. 14 Nebraska	Jack Trice Stadium; Ames, IA (rivalry)		L 7–42	45,807
November 14	1:30 p.m.	at Colorado	Folsom Field; Boulder, CO	PPV	L 8–37	49,438
November 21	1:00 p.m.	Kansas	Jack Trice Stadium; Ames, IA		W 23–20	26,059
*Non-conference game; ^{†}Homecoming; Rankings from AP Poll released prior to the game; All times are in Central time

== Roster ==
1998 Iowa State Cyclones football team roster
Players
Coaches
Offense

Pos.	#	Name	Class
TE	29	Mike Banks	Fr
RB	28	Darren Davis	Jr
WR	32	J. J. Moses	So
QB	18	Sage Rosenfels	So

Defense

Pos.	#	Name	Class
CB	10	Javon Daniels	Jr
DE	15	Reggie Hayward	So
DT	52	James Reed	So

Special teams

Pos.	#	Name	Class

Head coach

- Dan McCarney

Coordinators/assistant coaches

Legend

- (C) Team captain
- (S) Suspended
- (I) Ineligible
- Injured
- Redshirt

Roster
Last update: 2018-04-17
