= 1998 Missouri Tigers football team =

American college football season

1998 Missouri Tigers football

Insight.com Bowl champion

Insight.com Bowl, W 34–31 vs. West Virginia
- Conference: Big 12 Conference
- North Division

Ranking
- Coaches: No. 25
- AP: No. 21
- Record: 8–4 (5–3 Big 12)
- Head coach: Larry Smith (5th season)
- Offensive coordinator: Jerry Berndt (5th season)
- Defensive coordinator: Moe Ankney (5th season)
- Home stadium: Faurot Field

1998 Big 12 Conference football standings
	Conf.			Overall
Team	W		L	W		L
North Division
No. 10 Kansas State x	8	–	0	11	–	2
No. 19 Nebraska	5	–	3	9	–	4
No. 21 Missouri	5	–	3	8	–	4
Colorado	4	–	4	8	–	4
Kansas	1	–	7	4	–	7
Iowa State	1	–	7	3	–	8
South Division
No. 11 Texas A&M x$	7	–	1	11	–	3
No. 15 Texas	6	–	2	9	–	3
Texas Tech	4	–	4	7	–	5
Oklahoma State	3	–	5	5	–	6
Oklahoma	3	–	5	5	–	6
Baylor	1	–	7	2	–	9
Championship: Texas A&M 36, Kansas State 33
$ – BCS representative as conference champion; x – Division champion/co-champions; Rankings from AP Poll

The 1998 Missouri Tigers football team represented the University of Missouri during the 1998 NCAA Division I-A football season. They played their home games at Faurot Field in Columbia, Missouri. The 1998 Tigers had an overall record of 8-4 (5-3 in conference play), including a 34–31 win in the Insight.com Bowl over West Virginia at Tucson. They were members of the Big 12 Conference in the North Division. The team was coached by head coach Larry Smith. West Virginia took Missouri's spot in the Big 12 when the latter joined the SEC fourteen years later.

== Schedule ==
Date	Time	Opponent	Rank	Site	TV	Result	Attendance
September 5	6:30 pm	Bowling Green*		Faurot Field; Columbia, MO		W 37–0	48,971
September 12	2:30 pm	Kansas	No. 25	Faurot Field; Columbia, MO (Border War)	ABC	W 41–23	59,720
September 19	2:30 pm	at No. 1 Ohio State*	No. 19	Ohio Stadium; Columbus, OH	ABC	L 14–35	93,269
October 3	1:00 pm	No. 7 (I-AA) Northwestern State*	No. 25	Faurot Field; Columbia, MO		W 35–14	48,298
October 10	1:00 pm	at Iowa State	No. 21	Jack Trice Stadium; Ames, IA (rivalry)		W 35–19	38,756
October 17	1:00 pm	Oklahoma^{†}	No. 20	Faurot Field; Columbia, MO (rivalry)		W 20–6	61,586
October 24	11:30 am	at No. 7 Nebraska	No. 19	Memorial Stadium; Lincoln, Nebraska (rivalry)	FSN	L 13–20	76,425
October 31	1:00 pm	at Texas Tech	No. 18	Jones Stadium; Lubbock, TX		W 28–26	41,378
November 7	11:30 am	Colorado	No. 18	Faurot Field; Columbia, Missouri	FSN	W 38–14	57,261
November 14	11:30 am	at No. 6 Texas A&M	No. 13	Kyle Field; College Station, TX	FSN	L 14–17	60,433
November 21	2:30 pm	No. 2 Kansas State	No. 19	Faurot Field; Columbia, MO	ABC	L 25–31	68,174
December 26	7:00 pm	vs. West Virginia*	No. 23	Arizona Stadium; Tucson, AZ (Insight.com Bowl)	ESPN	W 34–31	36,147
*Non-conference game; ^{†}Homecoming; Rankings from AP Poll released prior to the game; All times are in Central time

== Rankings ==
Ranking movements Legend: ██ Increase in ranking ██ Decrease in ranking — = Not ranked RV = Received votes т = Tied with team above or below
	Week															
Poll	Pre	1	2	3	4	5	6	7	8	9	10	11	12	13	14	Final
AP	RV	25	21	25	23T	21	20	19	18	18	13	19	24	24	23	21
Coaches	RV	25	19	24	21	21	19	18	21	19	15	23	25	RV	RV	25
BCS	Not released								18	—	13	19	—	—	—	Not released

== Game summaries ==
=== Ohio State ===
#21 Missouri Tigers at #1 Ohio State Buckeyes

Quarter	1	2	3	4	Total
Missouri	0	14	0	0	14
Ohio State	7	6	8	14	35

at Ohio Stadium, Columbus, Ohio

- Date: September 19, 1998
- Game time: 3:30 p.m. EST
- Game weather: 80°, Sunny, wind 5 S
- Game attendance: 93,269
- Referee: J. Kemerling
- TV: ABC
- Box Score

Game information
First quarter
- OSU - Michael Wiley 21 yd run (Dan Stultz kick)

Second quarter

- MIZ - Corby Jones 10 yd run (Tim Geiger kick)
- OSU - Dan Stultz 27 yd field goal
- MIZ - Carlos Posey 65 yd fumble recovery (Tim Geiger kick)
- OSU - Dan Stultz 36 yd field goal

Third quarter

- OSU - Joe Montgomery 6 yd run (David Boston pass from Joe Germaine)

Fourth quarter

- OSU - Michael Wiley 11 yd run (Dan Stultz kick)
- OSU - Derek Combs 9 yd run (Dan Stultz kick)

== Coaching staff ==
Name	Position	Seasons at Missouri	Alma mater
Larry Smith	Head coach	5	Bowling Green (1961)
Jerry Berndt	Offensive coordinator & quarterbacks	5	Wisconsin–Superior (1960)
Corbyn Smith	Offensive tackle, tight end & Special teams coordinator	1	Iowa (1995)
David Mitchell	Running backs	2	Arkansas State
Andy Hill	Wide receivers	3	Missouri (1985)
Andy Moeller	Offensive line	6	Michigan (1986)
Moe Ankney	Defensive coordinator	5	Bowling Green (1963)
Dave Toub	Defensive line	1	UTEP (1985)
Ricky Hunley	Linebackers & associate head coach	5	Arizona (1984)
Jon Hoke	defensive backs	5	Ball State (1980)
