= 1998 Baylor Bears football team =

American college football season

1998 Baylor Bears football
- Conference: Big 12 Conference
- South Division
- Record: 2–9 (1–7 Big 12)
- Head coach: Dave Roberts (2nd season)
- Offensive coordinator: Eddie Williamson (1st season)
- Offensive scheme: Multiple I formation
- Defensive coordinator: Mike Cassity (2nd season)
- Base defense: 4–3
- Home stadium: Floyd Casey Stadium

1998 Big 12 Conference football standings
	Conf.			Overall
Team	W		L	W		L
North Division
No. 10 Kansas State x	8	–	0	11	–	2
No. 19 Nebraska	5	–	3	9	–	4
No. 21 Missouri	5	–	3	8	–	4
Colorado	4	–	4	8	–	4
Kansas	1	–	7	4	–	7
Iowa State	1	–	7	3	–	8
South Division
No. 11 Texas A&M x$	7	–	1	11	–	3
No. 15 Texas	6	–	2	9	–	3
Texas Tech	4	–	4	7	–	5
Oklahoma State	3	–	5	5	–	6
Oklahoma	3	–	5	5	–	6
Baylor	1	–	7	2	–	9
Championship: Texas A&M 36, Kansas State 33
$ – BCS representative as conference champion; x – Division champion/co-champions; Rankings from AP Poll

The 1998 Baylor Bears football team represented Baylor University as a member of the South Division of the Big 12 Conference during the 1998 NCAA Division I-A football season. Led by Dave Roberts in his second and final season as head coach, the Bears compiled an overall record of 2–9 with a mark of 1–7 in conference play, placing last out of six teams in the Big 12's South Division. The team played home games at Floyd Casey Stadium in Waco, Texas.

== Schedule ==
Date	Time	Opponent	Site	TV	Result	Attendance	Source
September 12	3:00 p.m.	at Oregon State*	Parker Stadium; Corvallis, OR		L 17–27	26,243	
September 19	11:30 a.m.	No. 20 NC State*	Floyd Casey Stadium; Waco, TX	FSN	W 33–30	28,734	
September 26	7:15 p.m.	at No. 15 Colorado	Folsom Field; Boulder, CO	FSN	L 16–18	46,603	
October 3	6:00 p.m.	at Texas Tech	Jones Stadium; Lubbock, TX (rivalry)		L 29–31	38,801	
October 10	6:00 p.m.	Kansas	Floyd Casey Stadium; Waco, TX		W 31–24	31,271	
October 17	6:00 p.m.	No. 10 Texas A&M^{†}	Floyd Casey Stadium; Waco, TX (Battle of the Brazos)	FSN	L 14–35	42,333	
October 24	6:00 p.m.	at Texas	Darrell K Royal–Texas Memorial Stadium; Austin, TX (rivalry)	FX	L 20–30	81,437	
October 31	2:30 p.m.	at No. 16 Notre Dame*	Notre Dame Stadium; Notre Dame, IN	NBC	L 3–27	80,012	
November 7	1:00 p.m.	No. 4 Kansas State	Floyd Casey Stadium; Waco, TX		L 6–49	38,217	
November 14	1:00 p.m.	Oklahoma	Floyd Casey Stadium; Waco, TX		L 16–28	27,930	
November 21	1:00 p.m.	at Oklahoma State	Boone Pickens Stadium; Stillwater, OK	FSN	L 10–24	28,750	
*Non-conference game; ^{†}Homecoming; Rankings from AP Poll released prior to the game; All times are in Central time
