= 1998 Oklahoma State Cowboys football team =

American college football season

1998 Oklahoma State Cowboys football
- Conference: Big 12 Conference
- South Division
- Record: 5–6 (3–5 Big 12)
- Head coach: Bob Simmons (4th season)
- Offensive coordinator: Ron Calcagni (1st season)
- Defensive coordinator: Rob Ryan (2nd season)
- Home stadium: Lewis Field

1998 Big 12 Conference football standings
	Conf.			Overall
Team	W		L	W		L
North Division
No. 10 Kansas State x	8	–	0	11	–	2
No. 19 Nebraska	5	–	3	9	–	4
No. 21 Missouri	5	–	3	8	–	4
Colorado	4	–	4	8	–	4
Kansas	1	–	7	4	–	7
Iowa State	1	–	7	3	–	8
South Division
No. 11 Texas A&M x$	7	–	1	11	–	3
No. 15 Texas	6	–	2	9	–	3
Texas Tech	4	–	4	7	–	5
Oklahoma State	3	–	5	5	–	6
Oklahoma	3	–	5	5	–	6
Baylor	1	–	7	2	–	9
Championship: Texas A&M 36, Kansas State 33
$ – BCS representative as conference champion; x – Division champion/co-champions; Rankings from AP Poll

The 1998 Oklahoma State Cowboys football team represented Oklahoma State University as a member of the Big 12 Conference during the 1998 NCAA Division I-A football season. Led by fourth-year head coach Bob Simmons, the Cowboys compiled an overall record of 5–6 with a mark of 3–5 in conference play, tying for fourth place in the Big 12's South Division. Oklahoma State played home games at Lewis Field in Stillwater, Oklahoma.

== Schedule ==
Date	Time	Opponent	Site	TV	Result	Attendance	Source
September 5	2:30 p.m.	at Kansas	Memorial Stadium; Lawrence, KS	ABC	W 38–28	32,500	
September 12	6:00 p.m.	at Tulsa*	Skelly Stadium; Tulsa, OK (rivalry)		L 20–35	40,385	
September 19	6:00 p.m.	No. 25 Mississippi State*	Lewis Field; Stillwater, OK		W 42–23	42,250	
October 3	6:00 p.m.	vs. No. 2 Nebraska	Arrowhead Stadium; Kansas City, MO	FSN	L 17–24	79,555	
October 10	6:00 p.m.	at Texas Tech	Jones Stadium; Lubbock, TX	FSN	L 17–24	47,589	
October 17	2:30 p.m.	at No. 3 Kansas State	KSU Stadium; Manhattan, KS	ABC	L 20–52	43,694	
October 24	6:00 p.m.	Oklahoma	Lewis Field; Stillwater, OK (Bedlam Series)	PPV	W 41–26	50,614	
October 31	6:00 p.m.	No. 8 Texas A&M^{†}	Lewis Field; Stillwater, OK	FSN	L 6–17	47,250	
November 7	2:30 p.m.	at No. 20 Texas	Darrell K Royal–Texas Memorial Stadium; Austin, TX	ABC	L 34–37	81,437	
November 14	2:00 p.m.	Southwestern Louisiana*	Lewis Field; Stillwater, OK		W 44–20	37,245	
November 21	2:00 p.m.	Baylor	Lewis Field; Stillwater, OK		W 24–10	28,750	
*Non-conference game; ^{†}Homecoming; Rankings from AP Poll released prior to the game; All times are in Central time
