= 1998 Texas Tech Red Raiders football team =

American college football season

1998 Texas Tech Red Raiders football

Independence Bowl, L 35–18 vs. Ole Miss
- Conference: Big 12 Conference
- South Division
- Record: 7–5 (4–4 Big 12)
- Head coach: Spike Dykes (12th season)
- Offensive coordinator: Rick Dykes (3rd season)
- Offensive scheme: Spread
- Defensive coordinator: John Goodner (4th season)
- Base defense: 4–2–5/4–4 hybrid
- Home stadium: Jones Stadium

1998 Big 12 Conference football standings
	Conf.			Overall
Team	W		L	W		L
North Division
No. 10 Kansas State x	8	–	0	11	–	2
No. 19 Nebraska	5	–	3	9	–	4
No. 21 Missouri	5	–	3	8	–	4
Colorado	4	–	4	8	–	4
Kansas	1	–	7	4	–	7
Iowa State	1	–	7	3	–	8
South Division
No. 11 Texas A&M x$	7	–	1	11	–	3
No. 15 Texas	6	–	2	9	–	3
Texas Tech	4	–	4	7	–	5
Oklahoma State	3	–	5	5	–	6
Oklahoma	3	–	5	5	–	6
Baylor	1	–	7	2	–	9
Championship: Texas A&M 36, Kansas State 33
$ – BCS representative as conference champion; x – Division champion/co-champions; Rankings from AP Poll

The 1998 Texas Tech Red Raiders football team represented Texas Tech University as a member of the Big 12 Conference during the 1998 NCAA Division I-A football season. In their 12th season under head coach Spike Dykes, the Red Raiders compiled a 7–5 record (4–4 against Big 12 opponents), finished in third place in Southern Division of the Big 12, and outscored opponents by a combined total of 315 to 215. The team played its home games at Clifford B. and Audrey Jones Stadium in Lubbock, Texas.

== Schedule ==
Date	Time	Opponent	Rank	Site	TV	Result	Attendance	Source
September 5	6:00 pm	UTEP*		Jones Stadium; Lubbock, TX		W 35–3	41,087	
September 12	6:30 pm	vs. North Texas*		Texas Stadium; Irving, TX		W 30–0	21,496	
September 19	6:00 pm	Fresno State*		Jones Stadium; Lubbock, TX		W 34–28	40,035	
September 26	11:30 am	at Iowa State		Jack Trice Stadium; Ames, IA	FSN	W 31–24	33,810	
October 3	6:00 pm	Baylor		Jones Stadium; Lubbock, TX (rivalry)		W 31–29	38,801	
October 10	6:00 pm	Oklahoma State^{†}		Jones Stadium; Lubbock, TX	FSN	W 24–17	47,589	
October 17	12:30 pm	at No. 19 Colorado	No. 22	Folsom Field; Boulder, CO	FSN	L 17–19	48,969	
October 24	2:30 pm	at No. 8 Texas A&M	No. 25	Kyle Field; College Station, TX (rivalry)	ABC	L 10–17	62,873	
October 31	1:00 pm	No. 18 Missouri		Jones Stadium; Lubbock, TX		L 26–28	41,378	
November 14	6:00 pm	No. 18 Texas		Jones Stadium; Lubbock, TX (rivalry)	FSN	W 42–35	50,647	
November 21	1:00 pm	at Oklahoma		Oklahoma Memorial Stadium; Norman, OK		L 17–20	65,583	
December 31	7:00 pm	vs. Ole Miss*		Independence Stadium; Shreveport, LA (Independence Bowl)	ESPN	L 18–35	46,862	
*Non-conference game; ^{†}Homecoming; Rankings from AP Poll released prior to the game; All times are in Central time

== Rankings ==
Ranking movements Legend: ██ Increase in ranking ██ Decrease in ranking — = Not ranked RV = Received votes
	Week															
Poll	Pre	1	2	3	4	5	6	7	8	9	10	11	12	13	14	Final
AP	—	—	RV	RV	RV	RV	22	25	RV	RV	RV	RV	RV	—	—	—
Coaches	—	RV	RV	RV	RV	RV	23	25	RV	RV	RV	RV	RV	—	—	—
BCS	Not released								—	—	—	—	—	—	—	Not released
