= Marlon Barnes =

American football player (born 1976)

No. 32
- Position: Running back

Personal information
- Born: March 13, 1976 (age 50); Memphis, Tennessee, U.S.
- Listed height: 5 ft 9 in (1.75 m)
- Listed weight: 215 lb (98 kg)

Career information
- College: Colorado
- NFL draft: 1999: undrafted

Career history
- Oakland Raiders (1999)*; Miami Dolphins (1999)*; Chicago Bears (2000); Miami Dolphins (2002)*
- * Offseason or practice squad member only
- Stats at Pro Football Reference

Marlon Barnes (born March 13, 1976) is an American former professional football player who was a running back in the National Football League (NFL). He played college football for the Colorado Buffaloes. Barnes played 13 games in the NFL for the Chicago Bears in 2000.
