= Ron Hudson (American football coach, born 1947) =

American football coach (born 1947)

Biographical details
- Education: California

Coaching career (HC unless noted)
- 1969–1970: California (GA)
- 1971: Stanford (GA)
- 1972–1976: California (WR)
- 1977–1978: Oregon (RB)
- 1979–1981: UCLA (RB)
- 1982–1985: Notre Dame (assistant)
- 1986: Memphis Showboats (QB/WR)
- 1987: Illinois (RB)
- 1988: Ohio State (RB)
- 1989–1994: Ohio State (QB)
- 1995–1996: Kansas State (PGC/QB)
- 1997–2002: Kansas State (OC/QB)
- 2003–2004: Kentucky (OC/QB)
- 2007: Hamburg Sea Devils (QB)
- 2010: Omaha Nighthawks (QB)

Administrative career (AD unless noted)
- 2005–2006: Kansas City Chiefs (assistant)

Accomplishments and honors

Championships
- World Bowl XV

Ron Hudson (born 1947) is an American football coach. He is best known for his tenure as the offensive coordinator of the Kansas State University football team. Hudson coached at Kansas State between 1995 and 2002. He also served the offensive coordinator at the University of Kentucky during the 2003 and 2004 seasons.

== Early career ==
Hudson began his coaching career at the University of California, where he served as wide receivers coach from 1972 to 1976. He worked as running backs coach at the University of Oregon from 1977 to 1978 and at UCLA from 1979 to 1981. Hudson accepted his first offensive coordinator position under Gerry Faust, serving the Notre Dame Fighting Irish from 1982 to 1985. Following Faust's resignation in 1985, Hudson regrouped with a 1987 job as running backs coach at the University of Illinois. He then worked at Ohio State as John Cooper's quarterbacks coach from 1988 to 1994, before joining Kansas State in 1995.

== Kansas State ==
Hudson coached for eight years (1995–2002) at Kansas State University under head coach Bill Snyder; for the final six years Hudson served the team as offensive coordinator. Hudson's teams averaged ten wins a season during his eight-year tenure at Kansas State, reaching eight consecutive bowl games. Kansas State led the NCAA's Division I-A in offense during the 1998 season and set a school record for points scored with 610. Five of Kansas State's six most productive seasons in terms of points scored occurred during Hudson's tenure with the team.

== Kentucky ==
In January 2003 Hudson left Kansas State to join the staff of Rich Brooks as offensive coordinator at the University of Kentucky. Hudson resigned at Kentucky in November 2004.

== Subsequent career ==
Hudson accepted an assistant coaching position with the Hamburg Sea Devils of NFL Europa until that league's dissolution in 2007. The Hamburg team won the last World Bowl in NFL Europa.
