= Bill Lafleur =

American football player (born 1976)

No. 4
- Position: Punter

Personal information
- Born: February 25, 1976 (age 50); Norfolk, Nebraska, U.S.

Career information
- High school: Catholic (Norfolk)
- College: Nebraska
- NFL draft: 1999: undrafted

Career history
- New Orleans Saints (2000-2001)*; Barcelona Dragons (2001); Montreal Alouettes (2001); Barcelona Dragons (2002); San Diego Chargers (2002)*; San Francisco 49ers (2002–2003); San Diego Chargers (2004)*
- * Offseason or practice squad member only

Awards and highlights
- 3× National champion (1994, 1995, 1997); Second-team All-Big 12 (1998)

Career NFL statistics
- Punts: 90
- Punting yards: 3,434
- Punting average: 38.2
- Stats at Pro Football Reference

William Lafleur (born February 25, 1976) is an American former professional football player who was a punter for two seasons with the San Francisco 49ers of the National Football League (NFL). He spent two seasons playing in Europe for the Barcelona Dragons. He played college football for the Nebraska Cornhuskers.

Lafleur was also a member of the San Diego Chargers.

Lafleur's nicknames are "the Goat" pertaining to facial hair, or "Guy" which is a reference to professional hockey player Guy Lafleur of Montreal.

== Early life ==
Lafleur attended Norfolk Catholic High School, where he played quarterback, safety, and handled all kicking duties for coach Jeff Bellar. He led the Knights to the Class C state title in 1991 and a runner-up finish as a senior in 1993. As a punter, he averaged 44 yards per punt as a senior. Lafleur claimed all-state honors as both a quarterback and a punter in 1993.

He was also a three-time state track qualifier in Long, Triple, and High Jump, as well as the 100M. Lafleur placed second in the triple jump by covering 45 feet as a Junior. His senior year was lost to an ACL injury as was his Junior campaign in the fall and winter sports.

== College career ==
Lafleur spent five years playing football for the University of Nebraska–Lincoln, where he walked on as a punter. He was redshirted in 1994 and was used sparingly the next three seasons, backing up Jesse Kosch.

Lafleur finally got his chance as a starting punter his senior season and did not disappoint, as he posted one of the best punting seasons in school history. He averaged 44.9 yards on 52 punts, including a career-long 64-yard blast against Colorado. He also buried opponents inside their own 20-yard line on 17 occasions.

Lafleur also set performance index records for P/K in Vertical Jump (35"), 10 (1.52), and Pro Agility (3.82), and total score for his position. Lafleur now is a principal in Norfolk Nebraska.

Lafleur left Nebraska as a member of three National Championship teams and held a 3.5 GPA at the conclusion of his academic career.

== Professional career ==
Lafleur went undrafted in the 1999 NFL draft and spent nearly three years out of football before signing with the Barcelona Dragons of NFL Europa in 2001, where he played for two seasons.

His performance earned him a contract with the San Diego Chargers in training camp 2002. He was later released before the regular season.

He was the punter for the 49ers in 2002 and 2003. He played in 21 games and made 90 punts for 3,434 yards and 3,019 net yards. After a successful rookie season in 2002, Lafleur's performance dropped after 5 games in 2003. Lafleur served as the team's holder for the remainder of the season. He would be released during the 2004 offseason.

He was then signed back by the San Diego Chargers to a one-year contract on June 3, 2004, but was released on August 31.

As of 2021, Lafleur is the principal of Norfolk Catholic Elementary.

== Personal ==
Lafleur is the son of Jim and Libby Lafleur. He was an education major at Nebraska. Bill frequently is referred to "Buffalo Bill" Lafleur, despite never playing for the Buffalo Bills. He is a scratch golfer and a teacher at Norfolk Catholic Schools.
