= Sirr Parker =

American gridiron football player (born 1977)

Profile
- Positions: WR, RB, DB

Personal information
- Born: October 31, 1977 (age 49); Los Angeles, California, U.S.

Career information
- College: Texas A&M

Career history
- 1999: San Diego Chargers
- 1999: Carolina Panthers
- 2000: Cincinnati Bengals
- 2001: British Columbia Lions
- 2002: Calgary Stampeders
- 2003: Dallas Desperados
- 2004: Austin Wranglers
- 2005–06: Inglewood Blackhawks
- Stats at Pro Football Reference

Sirr Eluan Parker (born October 31, 1977) is an American former professional football player who was a running back in the National Football League (NFL), Canadian Football League (CFL), and Arena Football League (AFL). He played college football for the Texas A&M Aggies.

== Early life ==
Sirr Parker, who was raised in South Central Los Angeles and graduated with honors from Alain Leroy Locke High School, was abandoned by his father when he was three, his mother, who struggled with alcoholism and drug abuse, and raised by his grandparents, and later Parker and his infant brother Donyea stayed with his aunt and uncle. Parker became the Los Angeles Times player of the year, first-team all-state and a second-team All-American pick by USA Today by leading the Los Angeles area in rushing (4,000 yards) and scoring (50 touchdowns) as a senior at Locke High School while playing for a team that went 0–9 that season. He was also the homecoming king and an honor roll student with a 3.9 grade-point average.

== College career ==
Parker was a running back at Texas A&M University, where he was known for his speed and playmaking ability. He ran a 4.24 40-yard dash which is still a school record, and held the school vertical leap record of 40.5 inches (later broken by Terrence Murphy).

Although injuries cut down on his playing time, he finished his college career by leading the Aggies to the 1998 Big 12 Conference championship his senior year. He helped A&M rally to defeat number 2-ranked Kansas State in the championship game, scoring a touchdown and a two-point conversion late in regulation to tie the score. He scored the winning touchdown on a 32-yard slant from Branndon Stewart on third-and-17 in the second overtime, sealing a 36–33 victory and earning the Aggies an invitation to the Sugar Bowl. On the year, he rushed for 226 yards and a touchdown on 69 carries while catching eight passes for 106 yards and two touchdowns, and returning nine kicks for 200 yards. His best overall season was his junior year, when he rushed for 800 yards and a team-leading 10 touchdowns on 149 carries (for 5.4 yards per carry) on his way to becoming a Doak Walker Award nominee. He also caught 18 passes for 194 yards and returned five kickoffs, including a 78-yard touchdown return... As a sophomore, he led the Aggies in rushing with 704 yards and two touchdowns on 149 carries while taking the only kickoff he returned 100 yards for a touchdown. As a true freshman, he finished third on the team with 312 yards on 71 carries while catching four passes for 77 yards. Overall as an Aggie, Parker rushed for 2,042 yards and scored 20 touchdowns.

== Professional career ==
=== NFL ===
Although Parker was not chosen in the 1999 NFL draft, he was signed as an undrafted free agent by the San Diego Chargers. The Chargers released Parker in August 1999; he was then signed by the Carolina Panthers. However, he was unable to join the active roster because of a lingering hamstring injury that he sustained at Texas A&M. Parker was placed on the inactive list before being waived once again.

Prior to the 2000 season, Parker was picked up by the Cincinnati Bengals. Because of both his speed and the team's lack of depth in the secondary, the Bengals switched Parker to cornerback, a position he had not played since high school. He spent most of the season on the practice squad. Although he was activated for the last three games of the season (seeing playing time in the final two), he did not record any offensive or defensive statistics. Upon his arrival at Cincinnati's mini-camp in May, Parker was released from the team.

=== CFL ===
Parker was signed by the British Columbia Lions prior to the 2001 season, but was released before the start of the season. He signed as a free agent with the Calgary Stampeders the following year. In his first preseason game, he rushed for 66 yards on three carries, but did not make their opening roster, and was once again released.

=== AFL ===
Parker was signed as a free agent by the Dallas Desperados to play receiver and defensive back in December 2002. He was inactive for the first nine games of the season before being placed on injured reserve in April 2003. He was activated with one game remaining in the season, but did not play in the season finale or in the playoffs. In January 2004, the Austin Wranglers traded for Parker, but he did not see playing time for the team.

=== Semi-pro ===
Parker played the 2005 and 2006 seasons for the Inglewood Blackhawks, a professional developmental football (minor league) team in the La Belle Community Football League. In 2006 Parker was named League Offensive MVP and team MVP when he had 95 receptions and 16 receiving touchdowns, both league records. His 6,578 total yards gained that season is second all-time in minor league football history.

== They Call Me Sirr ==
In 2001, Showtime released They Call Me Sirr, a TV movie about Parker's life starring Kente Scott as Sirr Parker and Michael Clarke Duncan as his high school coach.
