= Sheldon Jackson (American football) =

American football player (born 1976)

No. 88
- Position: Tight end

Personal information
- Born: July 24, 1976 (age 50); Diamond Bar, California, U.S.
- Listed height: 6 ft 3 in (1.91 m)
- Listed weight: 250 lb (113 kg)

Career information
- High school: La Verne (CA) Damien
- College: Nebraska
- NFL draft: 1999: 7th round, 230th overall pick

Career history
- Buffalo Bills (1999–2001)

Awards and highlights
- 2× National champion (1995, 1997); Second-team All-American (1998); First-team All-Big 12 (1998)

Career NFL statistics
- Games played: 45
- Receiving yards: 71
- Touchdowns: 2
- Stats at Pro Football Reference

Sheldon Blair Jackson Jr. (born July 24, 1976) is an American former professional football player who was a tight end for the Buffalo Bills of the National Football League (NFL) from 1999 to 2001. He played college football for the Nebraska Cornhuskers and was selected by the Bills in the seventh round of the 1999 NFL draft with the 230th overall pick. In three seasons, he had ten receptions for 71 yards and two touchdowns.
