= Kansas State Wildcats football statistical leaders =

The Kansas State Wildcats football statistical leaders are individual statistical leaders of the Kansas State Wildcats football program in various categories, including passing, rushing, receiving, total offense, defensive stats, and kicking. Within those areas, the lists identify single-game, single-season, and career leaders. The Wildcats represent Kansas State University in the NCAA's Big 12 Conference.

Although Kansas State began competing in intercollegiate football in 1896, the school's official record book considers the "modern era" to have begun in 1949. Records from before this year are often incomplete and inconsistent, and they are generally not included in these lists.

These lists are dominated by more recent players for several reasons:

- Since 1949, seasons have increased from 10 games to 11 and then 12 games in length.
- The NCAA didn't allow freshmen to play varsity football until 1972 (with the exception of the World War II years), allowing players to have four-year careers.
- Bowl games only began counting toward single-season and career statistics in 2002. The Wildcats have played in 12 bowl games since then, allowing players in those seasons to accumulate additional statistics.
- All of the Wildcats' ten highest seasons in total offensive yards have come since the year 1998.

These lists are updated through Week 7 of the 2026 season. Active players are listed in bold.

== Passing ==
=== Passing yards ===
Career
| Rank | Player | Yards | Years |
|---|---|---|---|
| 1 | Josh Freeman | 8,078 | 2006 2007 2008 |
| 2 | Skylar Thompson | 7,134 | 2017 2018 2019 2020 2021 |
| 3 | **Avery Johnson** | 6,877 | 2023 2024 2025 2026 |
| 4 | Lynn Dickey | 6,208 | 1968 1979 1970 |
| 5 | Jake Waters | 5,970 | 2013 2014 |
| 6 | Will Howard | 5,786 | 2020 2021 2022 2023 |
| 7 | Chad May | 5,253 | 1993 1994 |
| 8 | Carl Straw | 5,223 | 1987 1988 1989 1990 |
| 9 | Ell Roberson | 5,099 | 2000 2001 2002 2003 |
| 10 | Collin Klein | 4,724 | 2009 2010 2011 2012 |

Single season
| Rank | Player | Yards | Year |
|---|---|---|---|
| 1 | Jake Waters | 3,501 | 2014 |
| 2 | Josh Freeman | 3,353 | 2007 |
| 3 | Josh Freeman | 2,945 | 2008 |
| 4 | Michael Bishop | 2,844 | 1998 |
| 5 | Avery Johnson | 2,712 | 2024 |
| 6 | Chad May | 2,682 | 1993 |
| 7 | Will Howard | 2,643 | 2023 |
| 8 | Collin Klein | 2,641 | 2012 |
| 9 | Jonathan Beasley | 2,636 | 2000 |
| 10 | Chad May | 2,571 | 1994 |

Single game
| Rank | Player | Yards | Year | Opponent |
|---|---|---|---|---|
| 1 | Chad May | 489 | 1993 | Nebraska |
| 2 | Josh Freeman | 478 | 2008 | Oklahoma |
| 3 | Michael Bishop | 441 | 1998 | Louisiana-Monroe |
| 4 | Lynn Dickey | 439 | 1969 | Colorado |
| 5 | Josh Freeman | 404 | 2007 | Oklahoma State |
| 6 | Jake Waters | 400 | 2014 | West Virginia |
| 7 | Lynn Dickey | 394 | 1969 | Missouri |
| 8 | Lynn Dickey | 384 | 1970 | Oklahoma |
| 9 | Lynn Dickey | 380 | 1969 | Oklahoma |
| 10 | Chad May | 379 | 1994 | Kansas |

=== Passing touchdowns ===
Career
| Rank | Player | TDs | Years |
|---|---|---|---|
| 1 | **Avery Johnson** | 58 | 2023 2024 2025 2026 |
| 2 | Will Howard | 48 | 2020 2021 2022 2023 |
| 3 | Josh Freeman | 44 | 2006 2007 2008 |
| 4 | Skylar Thompson | 42 | 2017 2018 2019 2020 2021 |
| 5 | Jake Waters | 40 | 2013 2014 |
| 6 | Ell Roberson | 37 | 2000 2001 2002 2003 |
| 7 | Michael Bishop | 36 | 1997 1998 |
| 8 | Chad May | 34 | 1993 1994 |
| 9 | Jonathan Beasley | 33 | 1996 1997 1999 2000 |
| 10 | Collin Klein | 29 | 2009 2010 2011 2012 |
| | Lynn Dickey | 29 | 1968 1979 1970 |

Single season
| Rank | Player | TDs | Year |
|---|---|---|---|
| 1 | Avery Johnson | 25 | 2024 |
| 2 | Ell Roberson | 24 | 2003 |
| | Will Howard | 24 | 2023 |
| 4 | Michael Bishop | 23 | 1998 |
| 5 | Matt Miller | 22 | 1995 |
| | Jake Waters | 22 | 2014 |
| 7 | Brian Kavanagh | 20 | 1996 |
| | Josh Freeman | 20 | 2008 |
| 9 | Chad May | 18 | 1994 |
| | Josh Freeman | 18 | 2007 |
| | Jake Waters | 18 | 2013 |
| | Avery Johnson | 18 | 2025 |

Single game
| Rank | Player | TDs | Year | Opponent |
|---|---|---|---|---|
| 1 | Paul Watson | 4 | 1988 | Louisiana Tech |
| | Chad May | 4 | 1994 | Iowa State |
| | Brian Kavanagh | 4 | 1995 | Colorado State |
| | Brian Kavanagh | 4 | 1996 | Rice |
| | Brian Kavanagh | 4 | 1996 | Oklahoma |
| | Brian Kavanagh | 4 | 1996 | Kansas |
| | Michael Bishop | 4 | 1997 | Northern Illinois |
| | Michael Bishop | 4 | 1997 | Syracuse |
| | Michael Bishop | 4 | 1998 | Louisiana-Monroe |
| | Jonathan Beasley | 4 | 1999 | Oklahoma State |
| | Ell Roberson | 4 | 2003 | Oklahoma State |
| | Ell Roberson | 4 | 2003 | Oklahoma |
| | Josh Freeman | 4 | 2008 | Iowa State |
| | Jake Waters | 4 | 2014 | Texas Tech |
| | Jake Waters | 4 | 2014 | Kansas |
| | Will Howard | 4 | 2022 | Oklahoma State |
| | Will Howard | 4 | 2023 | Texas |

== Rushing ==
=== Rushing yards ===
Career
| Rank | Player | Yards | Years |
|---|---|---|---|
| 1 | Darren Sproles | 4,979 | 2001 2002 2003 2004 |
| 2 | Deuce Vaughn | 3,604 | 2020 2021 2022 |
| 3 | DJ Giddens | 3,087 | 2022 2023 2024 |
| 4 | John Hubert | 2,993 | 2010 2011 2012 2013 |
| 5 | Daniel Thomas | 2,850 | 2009 2010 |
| 6 | Ell Roberson | 2,818 | 2000 2001 2002 2003 |
| 7 | Alex Barnes | 2,616 | 2015 2016 2017 2018 |
| 8 | Eric Hickson | 2,537 | 1994 1995 1997 1998 |
| 9 | Collin Klein | 2,485 | 2009 2010 2011 2012 |
| 10 | Mike Lawrence | 2,265 | 1994 1995 1996 1997 |

Single season
| Rank | Player | Yards | Year |
|---|---|---|---|
| 1 | Darren Sproles | 1,986 | 2003 |
| 2 | Daniel Thomas | 1,585 | 2010 |
| 3 | Deuce Vaughn | 1,558 | 2022 |
| 4 | Darren Sproles | 1,465 | 2002 |
| 5 | Deuce Vaughn | 1,404 | 2021 |
| 6 | Alex Barnes | 1,355 | 2018 |
| 7 | DJ Giddens | 1,343 | 2024 |
| 8 | Darren Sproles | 1,318 | 2004 |
| 9 | Daniel Thomas | 1,265 | 2009 |
| 10 | Josh Scobey | 1,263 | 2001 |

Single game
| Rank | Player | Yards | Year | Opponent |
|---|---|---|---|---|
| 1 | Joe Jackson | 293 | 2025 | Utah |
| 2 | Darren Sproles | 292 | 2004 | Louisiana-Lafayette |
| 3 | Darren Sproles | 273 | 2003 | Missouri |
| 4 | Daniel Thomas | 269 | 2010 | North Texas |
| 5 | Mike Lawrence | 252 | 1996 | Iowa State |
| 6 | Alex Barnes | 250 | 2018 | Baylor |
| 7 | Darren Sproles | 235 | 2003 | Oklahoma |
| 8 | Daniel Thomas | 234 | 2010 | UCLA |
| 9 | Ell Roberson | 228 | 2002 | Nebraska |
| 10 | J.J. Smith | 227 | 1994 | UNLV |

=== Rushing touchdowns ===
Career
| Rank | Player | TDs | Years |
|---|---|---|---|
| 1 | Collin Klein | 55 | 2009 2010 2011 2012 |
| 2 | Darren Sproles | 45 | 2001 2002 2003 2004 |
| 3 | Ell Roberson | 40 | 2000 2001 2002 2003 |
| 4 | Deuce Vaughn | 34 | 2020 2021 2022 |
| 5 | Josh Scobey | 31 | 2000 2001 |
| 6 | Daniel Thomas | 30 | 2009 2010 |
| 7 | John Hubert | 28 | 2010 2011 2012 2013 |
| 8 | Eric Hickson | 26 | 1994 1995 1997 1998 |
| | Jonathan Beasley | 26 | 1996 1997 1999 2000 |
| | Skylar Thompson | 26 | 2017 2018 2019 2020 2021 |

Single season
| Rank | Player | TDs | Year |
|---|---|---|---|
| 1 | Collin Klein | 27 | 2011 |
| 2 | Collin Klein | 23 | 2012 |
| 3 | Mack Herron | 20 | 1969 |
| 4 | Daniel Thomas | 19 | 2010 |
| 5 | Deuce Vaughn | 18 | 2021 |
| 6 | Jonathan Beasley | 17 | 2000 |
| | Darren Sproles | 17 | 2002 |
| 8 | Josh Scobey | 16 | 2000 |
| | Ell Roberson | 16 | 2002 |
| | Darren Sproles | 16 | 2003 |

Single game
| Rank | Player | TDs | Year | Opponent |
|---|---|---|---|---|
| 1 | Jonathan Beasley | 5 | 2000 | North Texas |
| | Collin Klein | 5 | 2011 | Texas A&M |
| | Avery Johnson | 5 | 2023 | Texas Tech |
| 4 | Pat Jackson | 4 | 1990 | New Mexico State |
| | Josh Scobey | 4 | 2000 | Iowa State |
| | Josh Scobey | 4 | 2001 | New Mexico State |
| | Allen Webb | 4 | 2004 | Nebraska |
| | Daniel Thomas | 4 | 2009 | Texas A&M |
| | Collin Klein | 4 | 2011 | Kansas |
| | John Hubert | 4 | 2012 | Kansas |
| | Collin Klein | 4 | 2012 | West Virginia |
| | Joe Hubener | 4 | 2015 | TCU |
| | Winston Dimel | 4 | 2016 | Florida Atlantic |
| | Alex Barnes | 4 | 2016 | Baylor |
| | Alex Barnes | 4 | 2018 | Oklahoma State |
| | Skylar Thompson | 4 | 2019 | Oklahoma |
| | Adrian Martinez | 4 | 2022 | Oklahoma |
| | DJ Giddens | 4 | 2023 | UCF |

== Receiving ==
=== Receptions ===
Career
| Rank | Player | Rec | Years |
|---|---|---|---|
| 1 | Tyler Lockett | 249 | 2011 2012 2013 2014 |
| 2 | Kevin Lockett | 217 | 1993 1994 1995 1996 |
| 3 | Jordy Nelson | 206 | 2005 2006 2007 |
| 4 | Phillip Brooks | 182 | 2019 2020 2021 2022 2023 |
| 5 | Michael Smith | 179 | 1988 1989 1990 1991 |
| 6 | Aaron Lockett | 137 | 1998 1999 2000 2001 |
| 7 | Mitch Running | 133 | 1992 1993 1994 1995 |
| 8 | Curry Sexton | 129 | 2011 2012 2013 2014 |
| 9 | Dave Jones | 127 | 1966 1967 1968 |
| | Malik Knowles | 127 | 2018 2019 2020 2021 2022 |

Single season
| Rank | Player | Rec | Year |
|---|---|---|---|
| 1 | Jordy Nelson | 122 | 2007 |
| 2 | Tyler Lockett | 106 | 2014 |
| 3 | Tyler Lockett | 81 | 2013 |
| 4 | Curry Sexton | 79 | 2014 |
| 5 | Darnell McDonald | 75 | 1998 |
| 6 | Kevin Lockett | 72 | 1996 |
| 7 | Michael Smith | 70 | 1989 |
| 8 | Greg Washington | 69 | 1988 |
| 9 | Brandon Banks | 67 | 2008 |
| 10 | Quincy Morgan | 64 | 2000 |
| | James Terry | 64 | 2003 |

Single game
| Rank | Player | Rec | Year | Opponent |
|---|---|---|---|---|
| 1 | Jordy Nelson | 15 | 2007 | Missouri State |
| | Jordy Nelson | 15 | 2007 | Fresno State |
| 3 | Tyler Lockett | 14 | 2014 | Baylor |
| 4 | Michael Smith | 13 | 1989 | Missouri |
| | Tyler Lockett | 13 | 2013 | Texas |
| | Tyler Lockett | 13 | 2014 | UCLA |
| 7 | Mack Herron | 12 | 1969 | Colorado |
| | Michael Smith | 12 | 1991 | Washington |
| | Kevin Lockett | 12 | 1996 | Oklahoma |
| | Darnell McDonald | 12 | 1998 | Nebraska |
| | Tyler Lockett | 12 | 2013 | Oklahoma |
| | Tyler Lockett | 12 | 2014 | Texas Tech |
| | Jayce Brown | 12 | 2025 | North Dakota |

=== Receiving yards ===
Career
| Rank | Player | Yards | Years |
|---|---|---|---|
| 1 | Tyler Lockett | 3,710 | 2011 2012 2013 2014 |
| 2 | Kevin Lockett | 3,032 | 1993 1994 1995 1996 |
| 3 | Jordy Nelson | 2,822 | 2005 2006 2007 |
| 4 | Michael Smith | 2,457 | 1988 1989 1990 1991 |
| 5 | Aaron Lockett | 2,400 | 1998 1999 2000 2001 |
| 6 | Quincy Morgan | 2,173 | 2000 2001 |
| 7 | Phillip Brooks | 2,127 | 2019 2020 2021 2022 2023 |
| 8 | Jayce Brown | 1,972 | 2023 2024 2025 |
| 9 | Dave Jones | 1,904 | 1966 1967 1968 |
| 10 | Malik Knowles | 1,867 | 2018 2019 2020 2021 2022 |

Single season
| Rank | Player | Yards | Year |
|---|---|---|---|
| 1 | Jordy Nelson | 1,606 | 2007 |
| 2 | Tyler Lockett | 1,515 | 2014 |
| 3 | Tyler Lockett | 1,262 | 2013 |
| 4 | James Terry | 1,232 | 2003 |
| 5 | Quincy Morgan | 1,166 | 2000 |
| 6 | Darnell McDonald | 1,092 | 1998 |
| 7 | Mark Porter | 1,059 | 1987 |
| 8 | Brandon Banks | 1,049 | 2008 |
| 9 | Quincy Morgan | 1,007 | 1999 |
| 10 | Greg Washington | 928 | 1988 |

Single game
| Rank | Player | Yards | Year | Opponent |
|---|---|---|---|---|
| 1 | Tyler Lockett | 278 | 2013 | Oklahoma |
| 2 | Tyler Lockett | 237 | 2013 | Texas |
| 3 | Jordy Nelson | 214 | 2007 | Iowa State |
| 4 | Jordy Nelson | 209 | 2007 | Missouri State |
| 5 | Darnell McDonald | 206 | 1997 | Syracuse |
| 6 | Mark Porter | 199 | 1986 | Nebraska |
| 7 | Tyler Lockett | 196 | 2014 | TCU |
| | Tyler Lockett | 196 | 2014 | West Virginia |
| 9 | Tyler Lockett | 194 | 2012 | West Virginia |
| 10 | Quincy Morgan | 192 | 1999 | Kansas |

=== Receiving touchdowns ===
Career
| Rank | Player | TDs | Years |
|---|---|---|---|
| 1 | Tyler Lockett | 29 | 2011 2012 2013 2014 |
| 2 | Kevin Lockett | 26 | 1993 1994 1995 1996 |
| 3 | Quincy Morgan | 23 | 1999 2000 |
| 4 | Jordy Nelson | 20 | 2005 2006 2007 |
| 5 | James Terry | 18 | 2002 2003 |
| 6 | Darnell McDonald | 15 | 1997 1998 |
| 7 | Aaron Lockett | 14 | 1998 1999 2000 2001 |
| | Malik Knowles | 14 | 2018 2019 2020 2021 2022 |
| | Phillip Brooks | 14 | 2019 2020 2021 2022 2023 |
| 10 | Jayce Brown | 13 | 2023 2024 2025 |
| | Garrett Oakley | 13 | 2023 2024 2025 |

Single season
| Rank | Player | TDs | Year |
|---|---|---|---|
| 1 | Quincy Morgan | 14 | 2000 |
| 2 | Kevin Lockett | 13 | 1995 |
| | James Terry | 13 | 2003 |
| 4 | Jordy Nelson | 11 | 2007 |
| | Tyler Lockett | 11 | 2013 |
| | Tyler Lockett | 11 | 2014 |
| 7 | Greg Washington | 9 | 1988 |
| | Darnell McDonald | 9 | 1998 |
| | Quincy Morgan | 9 | 1999 |
| | Brandon Banks | 9 | 2008 |

Single game
| Rank | Player | TDs | Year | Opponent |
|---|---|---|---|---|
| 1 | John Williams | 3 | 1987 | Austin Peay |
| | Michael Smith | 3 | 1991 | Iowa State |
| | Jimmy Dean | 3 | 1996 | Rice |
| | Darnell McDonald | 3 | 1997 | Syracuse |
| | Quincy Morgan | 3 | 2000 | Ball State |
| | James Terry | 3 | 2003 | Baylor |
| | Jordy Nelson | 3 | 2007 | Oklahoma State |
| | Tyler Lockett | 3 | 2013 | West Virginia |
| | Tyler Lockett | 3 | 2013 | Oklahoma |
| | Tyler Lockett | 3 | 2013 | Michigan |
| | Byron Pringle | 3 | 2017 | @Oklahoma State |

== Total offense ==
Total offense is the sum of passing and rushing statistics. It does not include receiving or returns.

=== Total offense yards ===
Career
| Rank | Player | Yards | Years |
|---|---|---|---|
| 1 | **Avery Johnson** | 8,717 | 2023 2024 2025 2026 |
| 2 | Josh Freeman | 8,421 | 2006 2007 2008 |
| 3 | Skylar Thompson | 8,221 | 2017 2018 2019 2020 2021 |
| 4 | Ell Roberson | 7,917 | 2000 2001 2002 2003 |
| 5 | Collin Klein | 7,209 | 2009 2010 2011 2012 |
| 6 | Jake Waters | 6,766 | 2013 2014 |
| 7 | Will Howard | 6,707 | 2020 2021 2022 2023 |
| 8 | Lynn Dickey | 5,779 | 1968 1969 1970 |
| 9 | Michael Bishop | 5,715 | 1997 1998 |
| 10 | Jonathan Beasley | 5,607 | 1996 1997 1999 2000 |

Single season
| Rank | Player | Yards | Year |
|---|---|---|---|
| 1 | Jake Waters | 3,985 | 2014 |
| 2 | Michael Bishop | 3,592 | 1998 |
| 3 | Collin Klein | 3,561 | 2012 |
| 4 | Ell Roberson | 3,520 | 2003 |
| 5 | Josh Freeman | 3,349 | 2008 |
| 6 | Avery Johnson | 3,317 | 2024 |
| 7 | Josh Freeman | 3,313 | 2007 |
| 8 | Jonathan Beasley | 3,135 | 2000 |
| 9 | Collin Klein | 3,059 | 2011 |
| 10 | Will Howard | 2,994 | 2023 |

Single game
| Rank | Player | Yards | Year | Opponent |
|---|---|---|---|---|
| 1 | Josh Freeman | 501 | 2008 | Oklahoma |
| 2 | Michael Bishop | 475 | 1998 | Louisiana-Monroe |
| 3 | Chad May | 461 | 1993 | Nebraska |
| 4 | Michael Bishop | 446 | 1998 | Nebraska |
| 5 | Michael Bishop | 442 | 1998 | Texas A&M |
| 6 | Avery Johnson | 416 | 2025 | Baylor |
| 7 | Jake Waters | 413 | 2014 | West Virginia |
| 8 | Lynn Dickey | 411 | 1969 | Missouri |
| | Ell Roberson | 403 | 2003 | Nebraska |
| 10 | Josh Freeman | 403 | 2007 | Oklahoma State |

=== Touchdowns responsible for ===
"Touchdowns responsible for" is the official NCAA term for combined passing and rushing touchdowns.

Career
| Rank | Player | TDs | Years |
|---|---|---|---|
| 1 | Collin Klein | 87 | 2009 2010 2011 2012 |
| 2 | **Avery Johnson** | 83 | 2023 2024 2025 2026 |
| 3 | Ell Roberson | 77 | 2000 2001 2002 2003 |
| 4 | Skylar Thompson | 68 | 2017 2018 2019 2020 2021 |
| 5 | Will Howard | 67 | 2020 2021 2022 2023 |
| 6 | Josh Freeman | 64 | 2006 2007 2008 |
| 7 | Jonathan Beasley | 59 | 1996 1997 1999 2000 |
| | Michael Bishop | 59 | 1997 1998 |
| 9 | Jake Waters | 55 | 2013 2014 |
| 10 | Darren Sproles | 45 | 2001 2002 2003 2004 |

Single season
| Rank | Player | TDs | Year |
|---|---|---|---|
| 1 | Collin Klein | 40 | 2011 |
| 2 | Ell Roberson | 39 | 2003 |
| | Collin Klein | 39 | 2012 |
| 4 | Michael Bishop | 37 | 1998 |
| 5 | Jonathan Beasley | 34 | 2000 |
| | Josh Freeman | 34 | 2008 |
| 7 | Will Howard | 33 | 2023 |
| 8 | Avery Johnson | 32 | 2024 |
| 9 | Jake Waters | 31 | 2014 |
| 10 | Matt Miller | 30 | 1995 |

Single game
| Rank | Player | TDs | Year | Opponent |
|---|---|---|---|---|
| 1 | Collin Klein | 7 | 2012 | West Virginia |
| 2 | Jonathan Beasley | 6 | 1999 | Oklahoma |
| | Collin Klein | 6 | 2011 | Texas A&M |

== Defense ==
=== Interceptions ===
Career
| Rank | Player | Ints | Years |
|---|---|---|---|
| 1 | Jaime Mendez | 15 | 1990 1991 1992 1993 |
| 2 | Chris Canty | 14 | 1994 1995 1996 |
| 3 | Dyshod Carter | 13 | 1997 1998 1999 2000 |
| | Ty Zimmerman | 13 | 2010 2011 2012 2013 |
| 5 | Clarence Scott | 12 | 1968 1969 1970 |
| | Nigel Malone | 12 | 2011 2012 |
| 7 | Marcus Miller | 11 | 1986 1987 1988 1989 |
| 8 | Gary Morrill | 10 | 1979 1980 1981 1982 |
| | C.J. Masters | 10 | 1989 1990 1991 1992 |
| | Jermetrius Butler | 10 | 1998 1999 2000 |
| | Terence Newman | 10 | 1999 2000 2001 2002 |
| | Tysyn Hartman | 10 | 2009 2010 2011 |

Single season
| Rank | Player | Ints | Year |
|---|---|---|---|
| 1 | Chris Canty | 8 | 1995 |
| 2 | C.J. Masters | 7 | 1992 |
| | Nigel Malone | 7 | 2011 |
| 4 | Lyle Koontz | 6 | 1949 |
| | Hi Faubion | 6 | 1951 |
| | Barton Hundley | 6 | 1985 |
| | Jaime Mendez | 6 | 1990 |
| | Jaime Mendez | 6 | 1992 |
| | Jerametrius Butler | 6 | 2000 |
| | Bobby Walker | 6 | 2002 |
| | James McGill | 6 | 2003 |

Single game
| Rank | Player | Ints | Year | Opponent |
|---|---|---|---|---|
| 1 | Jaime Mendez | 4 | 1992 | Temple |
| 2 | Lyle Koontz | 3 | 1949 | Oklahoma State |
| | Robert Easterwood | 3 | 1986 | Western Illinois |
| | C.J. Masters | 3 | 1992 | Iowa State |
| | Chris Canty | 3 | 1995 | Akron |
| | Allen Chapman | 3 | 2012 | Oklahoma State |

=== Tackles ===
Career
| Rank | Player | Tackles | Years |
|---|---|---|---|
| 1 | Gary Spani | 543 | 1974 1975 1976 1977 |
| 2 | Brooks Barta | 436 | 1989 1990 1991 1992 |
| 3 | Mark Simoneau | 400 | 1996 1997 1998 1999 |
| 4 | Josh Buhl | 398 | 2000 2001 2002 2003 |
| 5 | Theopilis Bryant | 381 | 1973 1974 1975 1976 |
| 6 | Danny Lankas | 363 | 1965 1966 1967 |
| 7 | Dan Ruzich | 359 | 1979 1980 1981 1982 |
| 8 | Carl Pennington | 340 | 1973 1974 1975 1976 |
| 9 | Matt Wallerstedt | 338 | 1984 1985 1986 1987 |
| 10 | Barton Hundley | 314 | 1981 1982 1984 1985 |

Single season
| Rank | Player | Tackles | Year |
|---|---|---|---|
| 1 | Josh Buhl | 184 | 2003 |
| 2 | Danny Lankas | 178 | 1967 |
| | Gary Spani | 178 | 1977 |
| 4 | Danny Lankas | 175 | 1966 |
| 5 | Matt Wallerstedt | 165 | 1987 |
| 6 | Gary Spani | 153 | 1975 |
| 7 | Gary Spani | 151 | 1976 |
| 8 | Dan Ruzich | 150 | 1982 |
| 9 | William Fisher | 142 | 1978 |
| | Brooks Barta | 142 | 1992 |

Single game
| Rank | Player | Tackles | Year | Opponent |
|---|---|---|---|---|
| 1 | Danny Lankas | 28 | 1967 | Missouri |
| 2 | Danny Lankas | 26 | 1966 | Oklahoma State |
| 3 | Danny Lankas | 25 | 1966 | Colorado |
| | Danny Lankas | 25 | 1966 | Missouri |
| | Greg Jones | 25 | 1972 | Oklahoma |
| | Gary Spani | 25 | 1977 | Iowa State |
| 7 | Danny Lankas | 24 | 1966 | Iowa State |
| | Gary Spani | 24 | 1976 | Colorado |
| | Brent Venables | 24 | 1992 | Iowa State |
| 10 | Danny Lankas | 21 | 1966 | Oklahoma |
| | Gary Spani | 21 | 1974 | Missouri |
| | Gary Spani | 21 | 1976 | Missouri |
| | Dan Ruzich | 21 | 1982 | Missouri |

=== Sacks ===
Career
| Rank | Player | Sacks | Years |
|---|---|---|---|
| 1 | Darren Howard | 29.5 | 1996 1997 1998 1999 |
| 2 | Nyle Wiren | 27.5 | 1993 1994 1995 1996 |
| 3 | Jordan Willis | 25.5 | 2013 2014 2015 2016 |
| 4 | Dirk Ochs | 24.0 | 1993 1994 1995 |
| 5 | Monty Beisel | 22.0 | 1997 1998 1999 2000 |
| 6 | Ian Campbell | 20.5 | 2005 2006 2007 2008 |
| | Felix Anudike-Uzomah | 20.5 | 2020 2021 2022 |
| 8 | Andrew Shull | 20.0 | 2000 2001 2002 2003 |
| | Ryan Mueller | 20.0 | 2011 2012 2013 2014 |
| | Wyatt Hubert | 20.0 | 2018 2019 2020 |

Single season
| Rank | Player | Sacks | Year |
|---|---|---|---|
| 1 | Nyle Wiren | 11.5 | 1996 |
| | Ian Campbell | 11.5 | 2006 |
| | Ryan Mueller | 11.5 | 2013 |
| | Jordan Willis | 11.5 | 2016 |
| 5 | Dirk Ochs | 11.0 | 1995 |
| | Darren Howard | 11.0 | 1997 |
| | Chris Johnson | 11.0 | 2000 |
| | Felix Anudike-Uzomah | 11.0 | 2021 |
| 9 | Darren Howard | 10.5 | 1998 |
| | Monty Beisel | 10.5 | 2000 |
| | Meshak Williams | 10.5 | 2012 |

Single game
| Rank | Player | Sacks | Year | Opponent |
|---|---|---|---|---|
| 1 | Felix Anudike-Uzomah | 6.0 | 2021 | Texas Christian |
| | Chris Johnson | 4.0 | 2000 | Missouri |
| 3 | Nyle Wiren | 3.0 | 1994 | Iowa State |
| | Nyle Wiren | 3.0 | 1995 | Kansas |
| | Nyle Wiren | 3.0 | 1996 | Texas Tech |
| | Jeff Kelly | 3.0 | 1997 | Bowling Green |
| | Darren Howard | 3.0 | 1997 | Iowa State |
| | Joe Bob Clements | 3.0 | 1998 | Colorado |
| | Darren Howard | 3.0 | 1999 | Washington |
| | Mario Fatafehi | 3.0 | 2000 | Ball State |
| | Andrew Shull | 3.0 | 2002 | Baylor |
| | Andrew Shull | 3.0 | 2003 | Baylor |
| | Ian Campbell | 3.0 | 2006 | Illinois State |
| | Ryan Mueller | 3.0 | 2013 | Texas Tech |
| | Felix Anudike-Uzomah | 3.0 | 2021 | Southern Illinois |
| | Khalid Duke | 3.0 | 2022 | Texas Tech |
| | Felix Anudike-Uzomah | 3.0 | 2022 | Texas Tech |
| | Brendan Mott | 3.0 | 2022 | West Virginia |

== Kicking ==
=== Field goals made ===
Career
| Rank | Player | FGs | Years |
|---|---|---|---|
| 1 | Matthew McCrane | 55 | 2014 2015 2016 2017 |
| 2 | Martin Gramatica | 54 | 1994 1995 1997 1998 |
| 3 | Blake Lynch | 45 | 2018 2019 2020 |
| 4 | Chris Tennant | 42 | 2021 2022 2023 2024 |
| 5 | Jamie Rheem | 39 | 1996 1997 1999 2000 |
| 6 | Joe Rheem | 38 | 2001 2002 2003 2004 |
| 7 | Steve Willis | 37 | 1981 1982 1983 1984 |
| | Mark Porter | 37 | 1985 1986 1987 1988 |
| | Anthony Cantele | 37 | 2010 2011 2012 |
| 10 | Tate Wright | 31 | 1990 1991 1992 1993 |
| | Brooks Rossman | 31 | 2007 2008 |

Single season
| Rank | Player | FGs | Year |
|---|---|---|---|
| 1 | Brooks Rossman | 22 | 2007 |
| | Martin Gramatica | 22 | 1998 |
| 3 | Matthew McCrane | 20 | 2017 |
| 4 | Martin Gramatica | 19 | 1997 |
| | Anthony Cantele | 19 | 2012 |
| | Blake Lynch | 19 | 2019 |
| 7 | Jamie Rheem | 18 | 1999 |
| | Matthew McCrane | 18 | 2014 |
| 9 | Jamie Rheem | 17 | 2000 |
| | Jeff Snodgrass | 17 | 2006 |
| | Anthony Cantele | 17 | 2011 |
| | Chris Tennant | 17 | 2024 |

Single game
| Rank | Player | FGs | Year | Opponent |
|---|---|---|---|---|
| 1 | Jamie Rheem | 5 | 1999 | Texas |
| 2 | Martin Gramatica | 4 | 1998 | Kansas |
| | Martin Gramatica | 4 | 1998 | Oklahoma |
| | Jamie Rheem | 4 | 1999 | Utah State |
| | Joe Rheem | 4 | 2004 | Louisiana-Lafayette |
| | Brooks Rossman | 4 | 2007 | Colorado |
| | Josh Cherry | 4 | 2009 | Missouri |
| | Jack Cantele | 4 | 2013 | TCU |
| | Matthew McCrane | 4 | 2014 | West Virginia |
| | Jack Cantele | 4 | 2015 | Louisiana Tech |
| | Matthew McCrane | 4 | 2017 | Baylor |
| | Luis Rodriguez | 4 | 2026 | |

=== Field goal percentage ===
Career
| Rank | Player | FG% | Years |
|---|---|---|---|
| 1 | Matthew McCrane | 90.0% | 2014 2015 2016 |
| | **Luis Rodriguez** | 90.0% | 2025 2026 |
| 3 | Blake Lynch | 83.3% | 2018 2019 2020 |
| 4 | Jamie Rheem | 79.6% | 1996 1997 1999 2000 |
| 5 | Jack Cantele | 77.8% | 2013 2014 2015 |
| 6 | Brooks Rossman | 77.5% | 2007 2008 |
| 7 | Martin Gramatica | 77.1% | 1994 1995 1997 1998 |
| 8 | Anthony Cantele | 77.1% | 2010 2011 2012 |
| 9 | Joe Rheem | 76.0% | 2001 2002 2003 2004 |
| 10 | Chris Tennant | 73.7% | 2021 2022 2023 2024 |

Single season
| Rank | Player | FG% | Year |
|---|---|---|---|
| 1 | Martin Gramatica | 95.0% | 1997 |
| 2 | Matthew McCrane | 94.7% | 2014 |
| 3 | Blake Lynch | 90.5% | 2019 |
| 4 | Blake Lynch | 87.5% | 2018 |
| 5 | Joe Rheem | 86.7% | 2004 |
| | Luis Rodriguez | 86.7% | 2025 |
| 7 | Jamie Rheem | 85.7% | 1999 |
| | Jack Cantele | 85.7% | 2015 |
| 9 | Jamie Rheem | 85.0% | 2000 |
| 10 | Jack Cantele | 84.6% | 2013 |
| | Anthony Cantele | 82.6% | 2012 |
