= Josh Freeman =

American football player (born 1988)

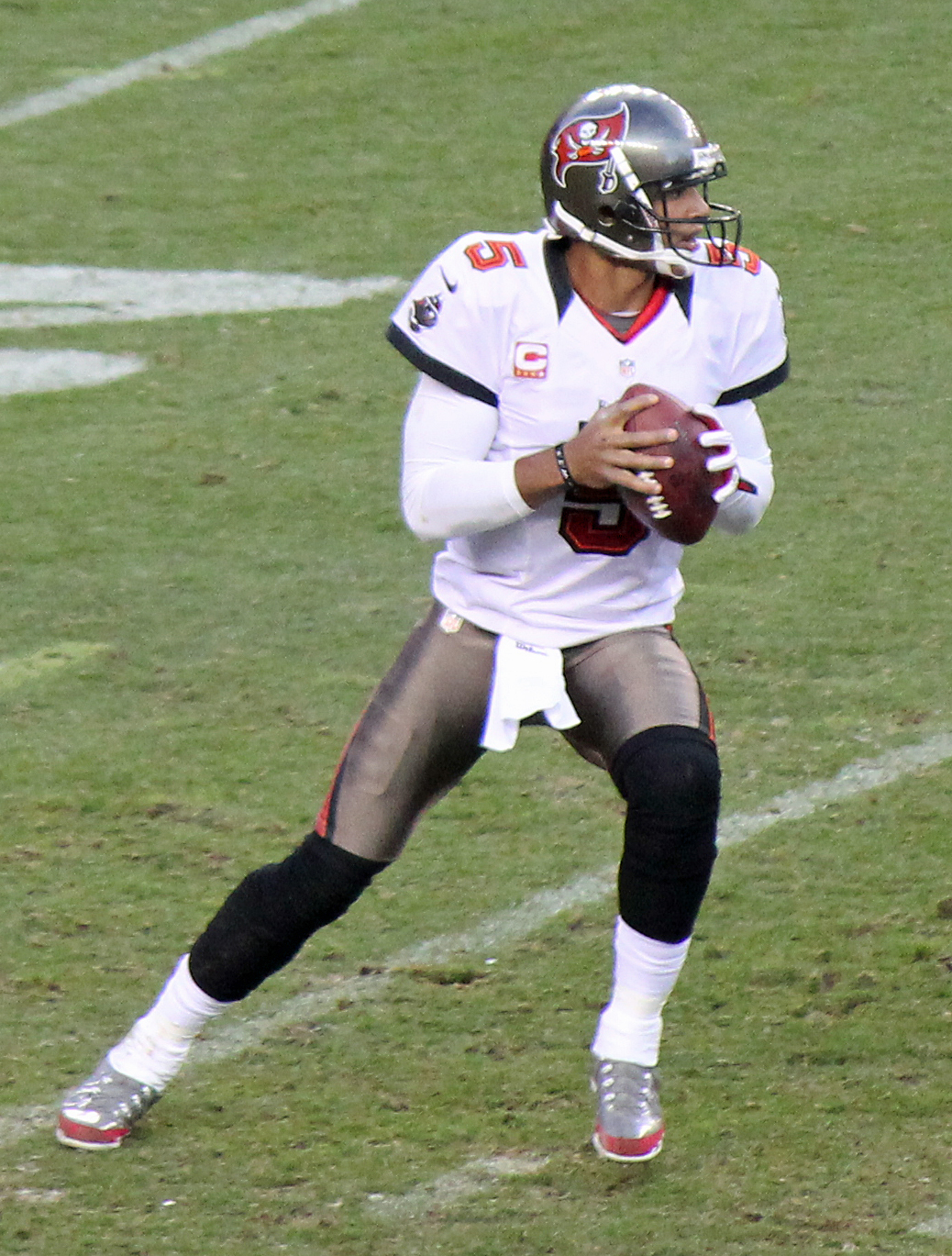
- Freeman with the Tampa Bay Buccaneers in 2012

No. 5, 12, 2
- Position: Quarterback

Personal information
- Born: January 13, 1988 (age 38); Kansas City, Missouri, U.S.
- Listed height: 6 ft 6 in (1.98 m)
- Listed weight: 240 lb (109 kg)

Career information
- High school: Grandview (Grandview, Missouri)
- College: Kansas State (2006–2008)
- NFL draft: 2009: 1st round, 17th overall pick

Career history
- Tampa Bay Buccaneers (2009–2013); Minnesota Vikings (2013); New York Giants (2014)*; Miami Dolphins (2015)*; Brooklyn Bolts (2015); Indianapolis Colts (2015); Montreal Alouettes (2018)*
- * Offseason or practice squad member only

Career NFL statistics
- Passing attempts: 2,048
- Passing completions: 1,179
- Completion percentage: 57.6%
- TD–INT: 81–68
- Passing yards: 13,873
- Passer rating: 77.6
- Rushing yards: 946
- Rushing touchdowns: 4
- Stats at Pro Football Reference

Joshua Tyler Freeman (born January 13, 1988) is an American former professional football player who was a quarterback in the National Football League (NFL). He played college football for the Kansas State Wildcats, and was selected by the Tampa Bay Buccaneers in the first round of the 2009 NFL draft. Freeman became the starter for Tampa Bay in his rookie year and went on to break numerous franchise passing records. However, he was released partway through his fifth year with the team.

Freeman was also a member of the Minnesota Vikings, New York Giants, Miami Dolphins and Indianapolis Colts, as well as the Montreal Alouettes of the Canadian Football League (CFL) and the Brooklyn Bolts of the Fall Experimental Football League (FXFL).

== Early life ==
Freeman passed for over 7,000 yards at Grandview High School where he was a four-star rated prospect by both Rivals.com and Scout.com. As a sophomore, he threw for 1,946 yards and 24 passing touchdowns, leading Grandview to a 9–3 record and a spot in the quarterfinals of the Class 4 playoffs. In addition, he set 10 school records during his career at Grandview, including career passing yards (7,175), passing touchdowns (78), attempts (809), completions (385), yards passing in a game (404), and touchdowns in a game (6). As a junior, he topped 2,400 yards through the air with 23 touchdowns. As a senior, he was the #4 pro-style rated quarterback in the country by Rivals.com as well as being ranked as the #92 overall prospect in the nation by Rivals and the top player in the state of Missouri. He was the #9 quarterback nationally. He led Grandview to a 7–4 record, a district title and a berth in the sectional round of the Missouri state playoffs. He also completed 151-of-286 passes (53%) for 2,622 yards and 33 touchdowns in 2005. He also earned first-team Class 4 all-state honors from the Missouri Sportswriters and Sportscasters Association. Freeman was selected to the Kansas City Star All-Metro team and was the 2005 Thomas A. Simone Award winner as the top player in the Kansas City metro area.

== College career ==
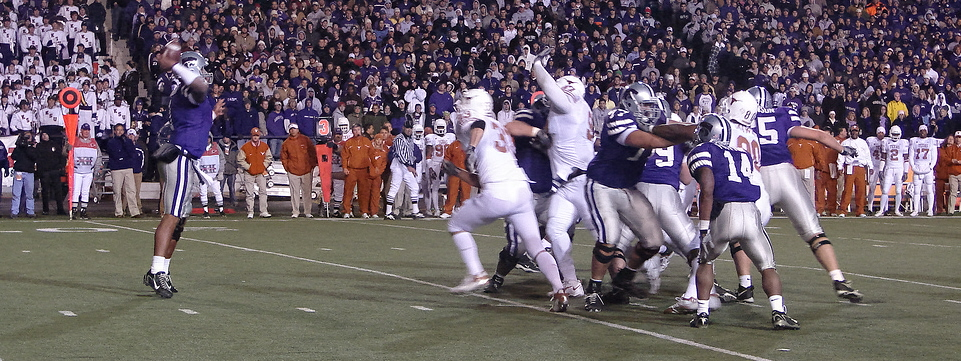
Freeman passes against the Texas Longhorns in 2007

Despite being a highly recruited quarterback prospect, one major program wanted the 6' 5" 225 lb Freeman as a tight end, which his African-American father saw as a racial slight. Freeman said he "didn't see it the same way" at the time, as the school already had a quarterback recruit from his class. Nevertheless, Freeman was not interested, as his longtime goal was to become an NFL quarterback. He originally committed to Nebraska to play for head coach Bill Callahan, but Kansas State head coach Ron Prince, convinced Freeman to enroll there instead.

As a freshman in 2006, Freeman appeared in 11 of 13 games that season, including starts in the final eight contests of 2006. He replaced Dylan Meier at quarterback during the second half at Baylor and directed the Kansas State offense the rest of the season. He passed for a Kansas State freshman record 1,780 yards on 140-of-270 passing (52%). He became the first true freshman to start a game at Kansas State since 1976. Additionally, he had consecutive 250+ yard passing games against Colorado and Texas, marking the first time a Kansas State quarterback had done so since Michael Bishop in 1998. He attempted a Kansas State freshman-record 47 passes against Nebraska, completing 23 for 272 yards. He earned his first career start against Oklahoma State and led the Wildcats to a comeback win. He finished the game 10-for-15 passing for 177 yards and ran for a game-winning 21-yard touchdown with 1:11 to go in the game. In 2007, he set new single-season school records for pass attempts, completions and yards after throwing for 3,353 yards and 18 touchdowns on 316-of-499 passing. In 2008, Freeman was 224 of 382 passing for 2,945 yards and 20 touchdowns and eight interceptions this season for a passer rating of 132.9. The 14 rushing touchdowns were the fourth-most in a single season by a Wildcat quarterback.

In his three-year collegiate career, Freeman completed 680 passes for 8,078 yards and 44 touchdowns and 34 interceptions in 35 career games. He accumulated a school-record 8,427 total yards and joined Ell Roberson as the only quarterbacks in Kansas State history to score at least 60 touchdowns.

== Professional career ==
Pre-draft measurables
Height	Weight	Arm length	Hand span	40-yard dash	10-yard split	20-yard split	20-yard shuttle	Three-cone drill	Vertical jump	Broad jump	Wonderlic
6 ft 5 3/4 in (1.97 m)	248 lb (112 kg)	32 3/4 in (0.83 m)	10 in (0.25 m)	4.97 s	1.79 s	2.91 s	4.43 s	7.11 s	33.5 in (0.85 m)	9 ft 11 in (3.02 m)	27
All values from 2009 NFL Combine

=== Tampa Bay Buccaneers ===
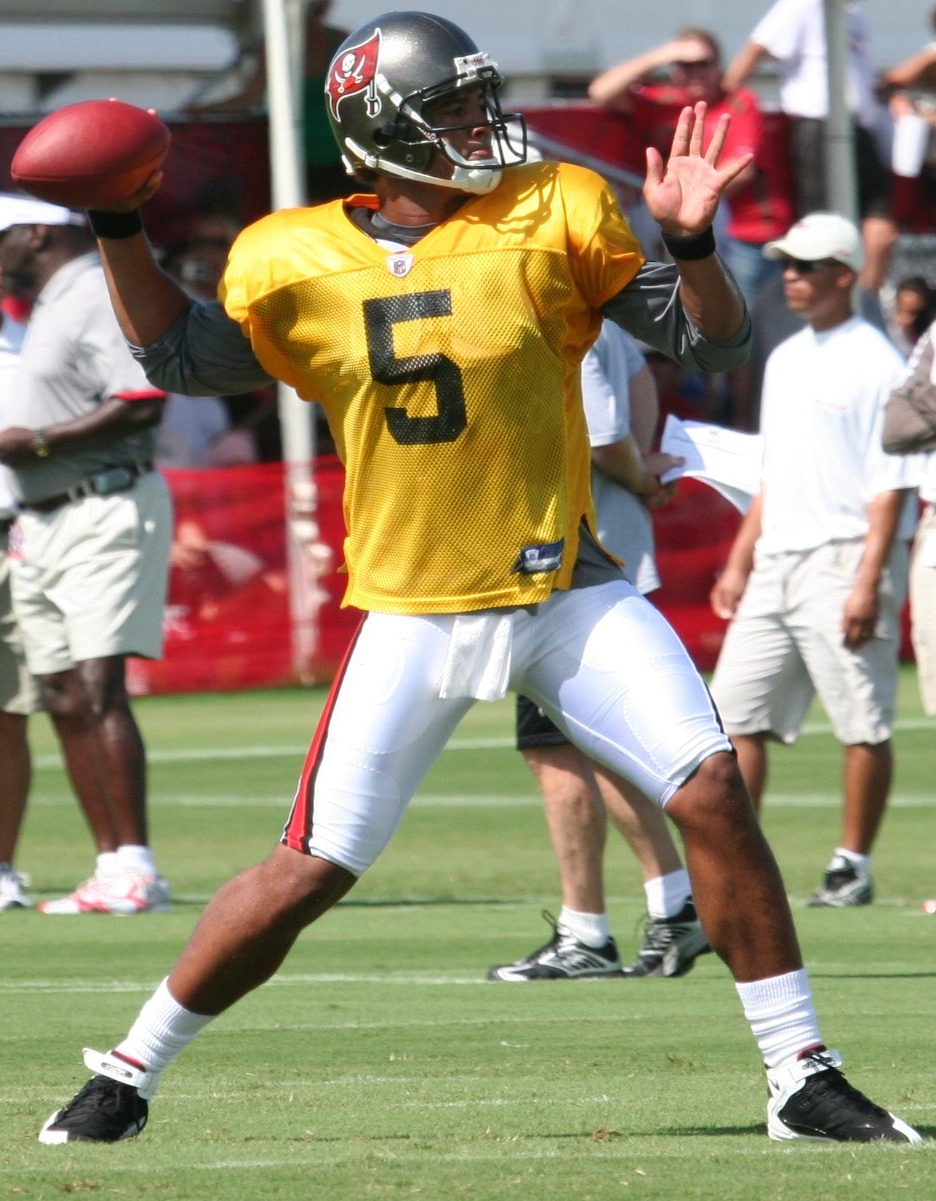
Freeman in 2009.

Freeman was selected by the Tampa Bay Buccaneers in the first round of the 2009 NFL draft with the 17th overall pick. He entered the draft with one year of college eligibility left. The Buccaneers later agreed to terms with Freeman on a five-year, $26 million contract, with another possible $10 million in incentives and bonuses. On November 8, 2009, Freeman started his first professional game at home against the Green Bay Packers. The Buccaneers won by a score of 38–28, ending an 11-game losing streak. He completed 14 out of 31 passes for 205 yards, three passing touchdowns, and one interception, including a fourth down touchdown pass to rookie Sammie Stroughter to take the lead, 31–28 late in the game. Freeman became the youngest quarterback in franchise history to start and win his first game. On December 27, 2009, he led the Buccaneers to a 20–17 overtime win over the 13–1 New Orleans Saints, preventing them from clinching the top seed in the playoffs for one more week. The Buccaneers finished the 2009 season with a 3–13 record as Freeman finished with 1,855 passing yards, ten touchdowns, and 18 interceptions.

Freeman began the 2010 season as the Buccaneers' starting quarterback. He started all 16 games of the season, the first Buccaneer quarterback to do so since Brad Johnson in 2003. In Week 5, Freeman earned NFC Offensive Player of the Week for his game against the Cincinnati Bengals. On December 26, 2010, Freeman completed 21 of 26 pass attempts for 227 yards and five touchdowns against the Seattle Seahawks, matching a franchise record for touchdowns in a game. On January 1, 2011, Freeman completed 21 of 26 pass attempts for 255 yards and two touchdowns against the playoff-bound New Orleans Saints. Both performances won him the FedEx Air Player of the Week. He was awarded NFC Offensive Player of The Week for Week 17. He led the team to a winning record of 10–6, barely missing the playoffs. He was ranked 86th by his fellow players on the NFL Top 100 Players of 2011.

Freeman participated in 15 out of the 16 games in the 2011 season. However, this season would prove to be disappointing for him compared to the previous season. He passed for 3,592 yards, 16 touchdowns, and 22 interceptions. He finished with a 74.6 quarterback rating. The Bucs finished with a 4–12 record, losing the final 10 games of the season.

After the 2011 season, head coach Raheem Morris was fired and replaced by former Rutgers head coach Greg Schiano. The Buccaneers also added new weapons for Freeman, signing former Indianapolis Colts tight end Dallas Clark, Pro Bowl wide receiver Vincent Jackson, and upgrading the offensive line with All-Pro left guard Carl Nicks. Freeman steadily improved in 2012, throwing 11 more touchdowns, five fewer interceptions, and 500 more passing yards compared to the 2011 season. The Buccaneers finished with a 7–9 record.

The Buccaneers started the 2013 season with an 18–17 loss to the New York Jets after leading by a score of 14–5 at the half. Freeman completed 15 of 31 passes (48.4%) and threw for one touchdown and one interception. After a poor performance in a 23–3 Week 3 loss to the New England Patriots, Freeman was benched in favor of rookie quarterback Mike Glennon. The Buccaneers began the season with a disappointing 0–3 record, and Freeman was completing 46% of his passes with a near league bottom 59.3 rating (30th). Trouble was already brewing coming into this season amid rumours of a growing rift with Coach Schiano, Freeman missed the team photo and his teammates did not select him as a team captain for the first time since his rookie campaign. He was released by the team on October 3, 2013, after the team tried unsuccessfully to trade him.

=== Minnesota Vikings ===
On October 6, 2013, Freeman signed with the Minnesota Vikings. He would begin to compete for the starting job with incumbent Christian Ponder and Matt Cassel. He changed his number to 12 after swapping with punter Jeff Locke, as Freeman had worn the number in high school. On October 16, 2013, he had been named starting quarterback for the Week 7 game against the New York Giants and for all future games. However, his start for the Vikings did not go well; Freeman completed only 20 of 53 passes and threw for only 190 yards and one interception. The Vikings ended up losing to the Giants 23–7, their only score being a punt return by Marcus Sherels. He was originally planned to start against the Green Bay Packers. However, he was having concussion-like symptoms during and following the game against the Giants and was therefore benched in favor of Ponder. Freeman finished the rest of the season as the third-string quarterback behind Ponder and Cassel.

=== New York Giants ===
On April 16, 2014, Freeman was rumored to have signed a one-year deal with the New York Giants. The deal was not officially signed until April 21, 2014, when Freeman attended the Quest Diagnostics Training Center to sign the contract and participate. On May 30, 2014, Freeman was released by the Giants.

=== Miami Dolphins ===
On April 2, 2015, Freeman signed a one-year deal with the Miami Dolphins On July 24, 2015, Freeman was released, but re-signed with the team four days later. Freeman played in Miami's preseason finale against his former team, the Tampa Bay Buccaneers on September 3, 2015. Freeman completed 13 out of 22 passes for 165 yards and two interceptions. He was released by the Dolphins on September 4, 2015.

=== Brooklyn Bolts ===
On September 22, 2015, Freeman signed to play with the Brooklyn Bolts in the FXFL. In his first game with the Bolts, which was played amid typhoon-like conditions caused by the approaching Hurricane Joaquin, Freeman fumbled five times in the wet conditions, losing three of them, and threw an interception.

=== Indianapolis Colts ===
On December 29, 2015, Freeman signed with the Indianapolis Colts. He started the final game of the regular season against the Tennessee Titans on January 3, 2016, due to injuries to starter Andrew Luck and reserve Matt Hasselbeck. Freeman split time with fellow recent signee Ryan Lindley and went 15 of 28 for 149 yards, one touchdown and one interception, as well as eight rushes for 24 yards. The Colts won the game by a score of 30–24. He was released on March 7, 2016.

=== Canadian Football League ===
Freeman attended minicamp in Florida with the Calgary Stampeders from April 29, 2017, to May 1, 2017. In May 2017, he attended an open tryout camp for the Montreal Alouettes in Dallas. On June 13, 2017, Freeman had a workout with the Alouettes at Bishop's University. The Alouettes' general manager, Kavis Reed, said that "Josh had a very good workout. He showed tremendous arm strength, an excellent touch on the deep balls, and excellent footwork". On January 9, 2018, the Alouettes added Freeman to their negotiation list. On January 12, 2018, the day before his 30th birthday, he signed a two-year contract with the Alouettes.

On May 26, 2018, Freeman retired from professional football one week into CFL training camp after being listed at the bottom of Montreal's depth chart.

== Career statistics ==
=== NFL ===
Year	Team	Games			Passing								Rushing				Sacks		Fumbles	
Year	Team	GP	GS	Record	Cmp	Att	Pct	Yds	Avg	TD	Int	Rtg	Att	Yds	Avg	TD	Sck	SckY	Fum	Lost
2009	TB	10	9	3–6	158	290	54.5	1,855	6.4	10	18	59.8	30	161	5.4	0	20	102	10	2
2010	TB	16	16	10–6	291	474	61.4	3,451	7.3	25	6	95.9	68	374	5.4	0	28	195	8	3
2011	TB	15	15	4–11	346	551	62.8	3,592	6.5	16	22	74.6	55	238	4.3	4	29	164	9	5
2012	TB	16	16	7–9	306	558	54.8	4,065	7.3	27	17	81.6	39	139	3.6	0	26	161	10	2
2013	TB	3	3	0–3	43	94	45.7	571	6.1	2	3	59.3	5	20	4.0	0	7	47	2	1
2013	MIN	1	1	0–1	20	53	37.7	190	3.6	0	1	40.6	0	0	0	0	1	14	0	0
2015	IND	1	1	1–0	15	28	53.6	149	5.3	1	1	65.9	8	24	3.0	0	1	7	0	0
Total		62	61	25–36	1,179	2,048	57.6	13,873	6.8	81	68	77.6	205	946	4.6	4	112	690	39	13

=== College ===
Season	Team	GP	Passing							Rushing		
Season	Team	GP	Cmp	Att	Pct	Yds	TD	Int	Rtg	Att	Yds	TD
2006	Kansas State	11	140	270	51.9	1,780	6	15	103.5	54	−21	2
2007	Kansas State	12	316	499	63.3	3,353	18	11	127.3	53	−40	4
2008	Kansas State	12	224	382	58.6	2,945	20	8	136.5	107	404	14
Career		35	680	1,151	59.1	8,078	44	34	124.7	214	343	20

== Career highlights ==
=== Awards and honors ===
- Earned three national player-of-the-week honors after a win over Texas in 2006, including Cingular All-America Player of the Week, the Walter Camp Foundation Offensive Player of the Week, and the Master Coaches Survey Player of the Week.
- Big 12 Conference Co-Offensive Player of the week (September 2, 2008)
- USA Today College Football Player of the Week (Named on October 15, 2008)
- Ranked No. 86 in the Top 100 Players of 2011

=== Buccaneers franchise records ===
- Most fourth quarter comeback wins in a single season- 5 (2010) (tied with Doug Williams)
- Most game winning drives in a single season- 5 (2010) (tied with Brad Johnson)
- Most consecutive games with a touchdown pass – 15 (2010–2011)
- Fewest interceptions in a single season: 6 (2010) (in 16 starts)
- Longest pass completion: 95 (vs New Orleans Saints) (2012)
- Most consecutive seasons, 3,000 yards passing – 3 (2010–2012) (tied with Brad Johnson and Jameis Winston)
- Most passing touchdowns in a game – 5 (tied) (December 26, 2010, vs. Seattle Seahawks) (tied with Jameis Winston and Tom Brady)

== Personal life ==
His father, Ron, was inducted into the Pittsburg State University Athletics Hall of Fame and also played in the United States Football League with the Pittsburgh Maulers and Orlando Renegades. Freeman's brother, Caleb, played football for Missouri in 2008.
