= 2012 Kansas State Wildcats football team =

American college football season

2012 Kansas State Wildcats football

Big 12 co-champion

Fiesta Bowl, L 17–35 vs. Oregon
- Conference: Big 12 Conference

Ranking
- Coaches: No. 11
- AP: No. 12
- Record: 11–2 (8–1 Big 12)
- Head coach: Bill Snyder (21st season)
- Co-offensive coordinators: Dana Dimel (6th season); Del Miller (13th season)
- Offensive scheme: Multiple
- Defensive coordinator: Tom Hayes (1st season)
- Base defense: 4–3
- Captains: Arthur Brown; B. J. Finney; Collin Klein; Ty Zimmerman
- Home stadium: Bill Snyder Family Football Stadium

2012 Big 12 Conference football standings
	Conf.			Overall
Team	W		L	W		L
No. 12 Kansas State $+	8	–	1	11	–	2
No. 15 Oklahoma +	8	–	1	10	–	3
No. 19 Texas	5	–	4	9	–	4
Oklahoma State	5	–	4	8	–	5
Baylor	4	–	5	8	–	5
TCU	4	–	5	7	–	6
Texas Tech	4	–	5	8	–	5
West Virginia	4	–	5	7	–	6
Iowa State	3	–	6	6	–	7
Kansas	0	–	9	1	–	11
$ – BCS representative as conference champion; + – Conference co-champions; Rankings from AP Poll

The 2012 Kansas State Wildcats football team represented Kansas State University in the 2012 NCAA Division I FBS football season. The Wildcats played their home games at Bill Snyder Family Football Stadium in Manhattan, Kansas, as they have done since 1968. 2012 marked the 117th season in school history. The Wildcats were led by head coach Bill Snyder in his 21st overall and fourth straight season since taking over for his second tenure in 2009. K-State competed as a member of the Big 12 Conference. Conference play began with an upset victory over the Oklahoma Sooners, which was the first win for the Wildcats in Norman since October 25, 1997.

The Wildcats started the season with an undefeated 10–0 record, and were ranked as the #1 team in country after a Week 10 defeat of TCU. However, the Wildcats' undefeated season and #1 ranking were derailed one week later after they were soundly defeated by upstart Baylor. The regular conference season came to a close with a fifth straight win over the Texas Longhorns, ending with an 8–1 record to clinch a share of Big 12 title with Oklahoma. Both teams made the postseason for the first time since the 2003 Big 12 Championship Game. Kansas State finished the regular season as the #5 ranked team and were invited to the Fiesta Bowl for the third time, where they were defeated by Oregon. The Wildcats suffered their second consecutive Fiesta Bowl loss since 2003 in the 2004 Fiesta Bowl, ending the season with an 11–2 record and were ranked #11 in the final polls.

== Off-season ==
The 2011 Wildcats finished the season with a 11–2 record overall, 8-1 in Big-12 play, behind Oklahoma State. They were invited to the Cotton Bowl Classic, where they were defeated by the Arkansas Razorbacks, making it the first Cotton Bowl Classic loss for the Wildcats since the 1996 team lost to the BYU Cougars in the 1997 Cotton Bowl Classic.

In mid-August, incoming freshman quarterback Tavarious Bender decided to leave the team and the university for undisclosed reasons.

== Schedule ==
Date	Time	Opponent	Rank	Site	TV	Result	Attendance
September 1	6:00 p.m.	Missouri State*	No. 22	Bill Snyder Family Football Stadium; Manhattan, KS	K-StateHD.TV	W 51–9	50,007
September 8	11:00 a.m.	Miami (FL)*	No. 21	Bill Snyder Family Football Stadium; Manhattan, KS	FX	W 52–13	48,843
September 15	6:00 p.m.	North Texas*	No. 15	Bill Snyder Family Football Stadium; Manhattan, KS	FSN	W 35–21	50,290
September 22	6:50 p.m.	at No. 6 Oklahoma	No. 15	Gaylord Family Oklahoma Memorial Stadium; Norman, OK	FOX	W 24–19	85,276
October 6	11:00 a.m.	Kansas	No. 7	Bill Snyder Family Football Stadium; Manhattan, KS (rivalry)	FX	W 56–16	50,344
October 13	11:00 a.m.	at Iowa State	No. 6	Jack Trice Stadium; Ames, IA (rivalry)	FX	W 27–21	56,800
October 20	6:00 p.m.	at No. 17 West Virginia	No. 4	Mountaineer Field at Milan Puskar Stadium; Morgantown, WV	FOX	W 55–14	60,101
October 27	2:30 p.m.	No. 15 Texas Tech^{†}	No. 4	Bill Snyder Family Football Stadium; Manhattan, KS	FOX	W 55–24	50,766
November 3	7:00 p.m.	Oklahoma State	No. 3	Bill Snyder Family Football Stadium; Manhattan, KS	ABC	W 44–30	50,781
November 10	6:00 p.m.	at TCU	No. 2	Amon G. Carter Stadium; Fort Worth, TX	FOX	W 23–10	47,292
November 17	7:00 p.m.	at Baylor	No. 2	Floyd Casey Stadium; Waco, TX	ESPN	L 24–52	38,029
December 1	7:00 p.m.	No. 23 Texas	No. 5	Bill Snyder Family Football Stadium; Manhattan, KS	ABC	W 42–24	50,912
January 3, 2013	7:30 p.m.	vs. No. 4 Oregon*	No. 7	University of Phoenix Stadium; Glendale, AZ (Fiesta Bowl)	ESPN	L 17–35	70,242
*Non-conference game; ^{†}Homecoming; Rankings from AP Poll released prior to the game; All times are in Central time

== Game summaries ==
=== Missouri State ===
	1	2	3	4	Total
Missouri State	3	3	3	0	9
#22 Kansas State	3	6	7	35	51

The Wildcats were favored by 34 going into the game.

=== Miami ===
	1	2	3	4	Total
Miami	3	3	0	7	13
#21 Kansas State	14	10	7	21	52

Kansas State was favored by 7 going into the game.

=== North Texas ===
Kansas State was favored by 28½ going into the game.

Team	1	2	3	4	Total
Mean Green	7	0	6	8	21
• Wildcats	7	7	7	14	35

- Location: Bill Snyder Family Football Stadium
  Manhattan, KS
- Game start: 6:05 p.m. CST
- Elapsed time: 3:06
- Game attendance: 50,290
- Game weather: 70°, cloudy, winds SE 5 mph
- Referee: Charles Lewis
- TV announcers (FSN): Mike Morgan, J. C. Pearson, and Laura McKeeman

Scoring summary
1	4:00	North Texas	Brelan Chancellor 6-yd run (Zach Olen kick)	North Texas 7–0
1	3:47	Kansas State	Tyler Lockett Tyler 96-yd kickoff return (A. Cantele kick)	7-7
2	2:24	Kansas State	T. Thompson 38-yd pass from Collin Klein (A. Cantele kick)	Kansas State 14-7
3	7:03	North Texas	A. Jimmerson 1-yd run (Zach Olen kick failed)	Kansas State 14-13
3	3:15	Kansas State	T. Thompson 21-yd pass from Collin Klein (A. Cantele kick)	Kansas State 21-13
4	13:20	Kansas State	John Hubert 6-yd run (A. Cantele kick)	Kansas State 28-13
4	6:44	Kansas State	Collin Klein 1-yd run (A. Cantele kick)	Kansas State 35-13
4	2:31	North Texas	Brelan Chancellor 19-yd pass from Derek Thompson (Brandin Byrd pass from Derek Thompson)	Kansas State 35-21

For their next road game, the Mean Green played the Kansas State Wildcats, led by potential Heisman Trophy candidate Collin Klein. The two teams had last met during the 2010 season, when the Wildcats defeated the Mean Green 41–49 in the final game at Fouts Field. This time playing at Bill Snyder Family Football Stadium, the Wildcats were favored to win by 28 points by spread bettors prior to the game. Each team scored two touchdowns by midway through the third quarter, but a blocked extra point attempt after North Texas' second score made the score 14-13. Kansas State answered with three unanswered touchdowns in the third and fourth quarter, bringing the score to 35-13 before North Texas scored its final touchdown with 2:31 left in the game. The final score was 35-13 in favor of the Wildcats. Mean Green quarterback Derek Thompson completed 25 of 28 passes in the game.

=== Oklahoma ===
Oklahoma was favored by 14 going into the game.

#15 Kansas State Wildcats at #6 Oklahoma Sooners – Game summary

Quarter	1	2	3	4	Total
#15 Kansas State	0	10	0	14	24
#6 Oklahoma	3	3	7	6	19

at Gaylord Family Oklahoma Memorial Stadium, Norman, Oklahoma

- Date: September 22
- Game time: 6:50 p.m. CDT
- Game weather: Temperature: 88 °F (31 °C) • Wind: NE 12 • Weather: Clear
- Game attendance: 85,276
- Referee: Tom Walker
- TV announcers (FOX): Gus Johnson (Play-by-play), Charles Davis (Color) & Julie Alexandria (Sideline)

Game information

First quarter

- OU – 06:16 Michael Hunnicutt 28 yd field goal (OU 3–0)

Second quarter

- KSU – 12:20 Jarell Childs 1 yd fumble recovery, Anthony Cantele XP good (KSU 7–3)
- KSU – 02:28 Anthony Cantele 23 yd field goal (KSU 10–3)
- OU – 00:35 Michael Hunnicutt 34 yd field goal (KSU 10–6)

Third quarter

- OU – 05:00 Blake Bell 3 yd run, Michael Hunnicutt XP good (OU 13–10)

Fourth quarter

- KSU – 13:16 Collin Klein 5 yd run, Anthony Cantele XP good (KSU 17–13)
- KSU – 07:27 John Hubert 9 yd run, Anthony Cantele XP good (KSU 24–13)
- OU – 04:09 Sterling Shepard 10 yd pass from Landry Jones, Landry Jones pass failed (KSU 24–19)

Top passers

- KSU – Collin Klein 13/21, 149 yards
- OU – Landry Jones 28/43, 298 yards, 1 TD, 1 INT

Top rushers

- KSU – John Hubert 23 attempts, 130 yards, 1 TD
- OU – Dominique Whaley 9 attempts, 51 yards

Top receivers

- KSU – Tramaine Thompson 3 receptions, 49 yards
- OU – Sterling Shepard 7 receptions, 108 yards, 1 TD

Top tacklers

- KSU – Arthur Brown 8 tackles
- OU – Tony Jefferson 14 tackles

=== Kansas ===
	1	2	3	4	Total
Kansas	7	7	2	0	16
#7 Kansas State	7	14	28	7	56

Kansas State was favored by 24 going into the game.

=== Iowa State ===
Kansas State was favored by 7 going into the game.

Game Six: Kansas State Wildcats at Iowa State Cyclones – Game summary

Quarter	1	2	3	4	Total
Wildcats	3	14	7	3	27
Cyclones	0	14	0	7	21

at Jack Trice Stadium, Ames, IA

- Date: October 13
- Game time: 11:06 a.m. CDT
- Game weather: Temperature: 61° • Wind: S 10–15 • Weather: Overcast, mist
- Game attendance: 56,800
- Referee: Reggie Smith
- TV announcers (FX): Justin Kutcher (Play-by-play), Eric Crouch (Color), & Darius Walker (Sideline)

Game information

First quarter

- KSU – 06:58 Anthony Cantele 41 yd field goal good (KSU 3–0)

Second quarter

- ISU – 14:58 Shontrelle Johnson 2 yd pass from Jared Barnett, Edwin Arceo XP good (ISU 7–3)
- KSU – 08:18 Collin Klein 2 yd run, Anthony Cantele XP good (KSU 10–7)
- ISU – 02:27 Ernst Brun 30 yd pass from Jared Barnett, Edwin Arceo XP good (ISU 14–10)
- KSU – 00:49 Collin Klein 6 yd run, Anthony Cantele XP good (KSU 17–14)

Third quarter

- KSU – 01:33 Collin Klein 12 yd run, Anthony Cantele XP good (KSU 24–14)

Fourth quarter

- ISU – 12:34 Jeff Woody 2 yd run, Edwin Arceo XP good (KSU 24–21)
- KSU – 04:24 Anthony Cantele 25 yd field goal good (KSU 27–21)

Top passers

- KSU – Collin Klein 16/24, 187 yards
- ISU – Jared Barnett 16/36, 166 yards, 2 TD, 1 INT

Top rushers

- KSU – Collin Klein 25 attempts, 105 yards, 3 TD
- ISU – Jared Barnett 8 attempts, 35 yards

Top receivers

- KSU – Tyler Lockett 2 receptions, 55 yards
- ISU – Aaron Horne 7 receptions, 84 yards

Top tacklers

- KSU – Randall Evans 9 tackles
- ISU – Jake Knott 13 tackles

=== West Virginia ===
	1	2	3	4	Total
#4 Kansas State	10	21	21	3	55
#17 West Virginia	0	7	0	7	14

West Virginia was favored by 2.5 going into the game. The game was hyped as a matchup between Heisman Trophy hopefuls Geno Smith from West Virginia and Collin Klein from Kansas State. Kansas State took an early lead and had the score at 52–7 with 2:25 left in the third quarter. The final score was a Kansas State victory 55–14.

After the conclusion of the season, ESPN sportswriter David Ubben named this the fifth best game of the Big 12 Conference for the season.

=== Texas Tech ===
	1	2	3	4	Total
#15 Texas Tech	7	3	7	7	24
#4 Kansas State	3	10	21	21	55

Kansas State was favored by 7 going into the game.

=== Oklahoma State ===
	1	2	3	4	Total
Oklahoma State	7	10	3	10	30
#3 Kansas State	7	24	7	6	44

Kansas State was favored by 8.5 points going into the game.

=== TCU ===
	1	2	3	4	Total
#3 Kansas State	10	3	10	0	23
TCU	0	0	0	10	10

Kansas State was favored by 7 points heading to the game.

=== Baylor ===
Kansas State was favored by 11 points going into the game.

#1 Kansas State at Baylor

Team	1	2	3	4	Total
#1 Wildcats	7	10	7	0	24
• Bears	14	14	24	0	52

- Date: November 17
- Location: Floyd Casey Stadium
  Waco, Texas
- Game start: 7:00 p.m. CST
- Elapsed time: 3:28
- Game attendance: 38,029
- Game weather: 55 °F (13 °C), Clear, winds SE at 4mph
- Referee: Scott Novak
- TV announcers (ESPN): Brad Nessler (Play-by-play), Todd Blackledge (Color) & Holly Rowe (Sideline)

One week after falling in Norman, and almost a year to the day after the Bears' BCS-shaking first victory against Oklahoma, the Bears again took on a top 5 opponent in Waco. This time the opponent was 10–0 Kansas State, ranked #1 in the BCS after an Alabama loss the previous week and clear favorites in their final two games of the year, at Baylor and vs. Texas. As so often during the season, the quick-strike Baylor offense put the Bears ahead early on a 38-yard Florence pass to Tevin Reese. Kansas State answered when then-Heisman favorite Collin Klein completed a touchdown pass to tie the game 7–7. Baylor subsequently put up 21 unanswered points to go ahead 28–7 before the Wildcats managed 10 more points in the final two minutes of the first half. In the third quarter, Baylor put up another touchdown (a 4-yard Glasco Martin IV rush) and forced a Kansas State punt that pinned Baylor on their own 1-yard line. Two plays later, Florence attempted a quick pass to Terrance Williams that was intercepted on the 2-yard line, setting up a Collin Klein touchdown rush that made the score 35–24 in Baylor's favor. The Bears went on to rack up 17 more points in the third quarter, the last touchdown coming on an 80-yard Lache Seastrunk rush after Joe Williams intercepted Klein in the endzone (the third of Klein's three interceptions on the night). With 58 seconds remaining in the third quarter following Seastrunk's touchdown, Kansas State embarked upon an 8-minute, 21 play, 74-yard drive that brought the Wildcats to first-and-goal from the Baylor 6-yard line. An inspired Baylor defense turned in the goal-line stand of their season, halting four straight Collin Klein rushes and forcing a turnover on downs. Baylor would subsequently almost completely run down the clock, picking up 4 first downs on 10 straight rushes before punting the ball back to Kansas State with only 32 seconds left in the game. The victory was Baylor's first ever over a #1 ranked opponent (the 1956 team defeated #2 Tennessee in the 1957 Sugar Bowl, and the 1941 team tied #1 Texas) and represented only the fifth time in the BCS era that the #1 ranked team lost to an unranked opponent. The win took Baylor to 5–5 on the season, needing one more victory for bowl eligibility.

Scoring summary

Quarter	Time	Drive			Team	Scoring information	Score	
Quarter	Time	Plays	Yards	TOP	Team	Scoring information	Kansas State	Baylor
1	13:04	6	82	1:56	Baylor	Tevin Reese 38-yard touchdown reception from Nick Florence, Aaron Jones kick good	0	7
1	9:47	6	38	3:17	Kansas State	Torell Miller 8-yard touchdown reception from Collin Klein, Anthony Cantele kick good	7	7
1	6:29	11	75	3:18	Baylor	Nick Florence 12-yard touchdown run, Aaron Jones kick good	7	14
2	6:42	8	55	3:23	Baylor	Terrance Williams 22-yard touchdown reception from Nick Florence, Aaron Jones kick good	7	21
2	2:54	9	64	2:47	Baylor	Glasco Martin IV 2-yard touchdown run, Aaron Jones kick good	7	28
2	1:47	4	63	1:07	Kansas State	Chris Harper 7-yard touchdown reception from Collin Klein, Anthony Cantele kick good	14	28
2	0:00	10	63	0:51	Kansas State	23-yard field goal by Anthony Cantele	17	28
3	13:19	4	38	0:49	Baylor	Glasco Martin IV 4-yard touchdown run, Aaron Jones kick good	17	35
3	12:25	1	1	0:05	Kansas State	Collin Klein 1-yard touchdown run, Anthony Cantele kick good	24	35
3	7:58	13	45	4:27	Baylor	50-yard field goal by Aaron Jones	24	38
3	4:32	4	54	1:19	Baylor	Glasco Martin IV -yard touchdown run, Aaron Jones kick good	24	45
3	0:58	1	80	0:12	Baylor	Lache Seastrunk 80-yard touchdown run, Aaron Jones kick good	24	52
"TOP" = time of possession. For other American football terms, see Glossary of American football.							24	52

=== Texas ===
	1	2	3	4	Total
#23 Texas	0	10	7	7	24
#6 Kansas State	7	0	7	28	42

Kansas State was favored by 10.5 points heading to the game.

Kansas State won the game, clinching their second Big 12 title, their first since 2003.

=== 2013 Fiesta Bowl (vs. Oregon) ===
	1	2	3	4	Total
#4 Oregon	15	7	10	3	35
#5 Kansas State	0	10	0	7	17

Oregon was favored by 9 points going to the game.

== Rankings ==
Ranking movements Legend: ██ Increase in ranking ██ Decrease in ranking
	Week															
Poll	Pre	1	2	3	4	5	6	7	8	9	10	11	12	13	14	Final
AP	22	21	15	15	7	7	6	4	4	3	3	2	7	7	7	12
Coaches	21	20	14	13	8	8	5	3	4	3	3	2	8	7	6	11
Harris	Not released						5	4	4	3	3	2	7	6	6	Not released
BCS	Not released							4	3	2	2	1	6	6	5	Not released

== Roster ==
2012 roster
Quarterbacks: 4 Daniel Sams – (redshirt) Fr.; 7 Collin Klein – Sr.; 15 Sam Johnson – So.; 19 Joe Hubener – Fr.; Running backs: 5 Robert Rose – Jr.; 8 Angelo Pease – Jr.; 20 DeMarcus Robinson – So.; 24 Charles Jones – Fr.; 28 Jarvis Leverett – Fr.; 33 John Hubert – Jr.; 41 Seth Filbert – Fr.; Full backs: 27 Brad Duncan – So.; 36 Ben Kall – Sr.; 37 Braden Wilson – Sr.; 39 Austin Katsorelos – Fr.; 48 Glenn Gronkowski – Fr.; 89 Zach Nemechek – So.; Wide receivers: 2 Stephen Johnson – Jr.; 3 Chris Harper – Sr.; 10 Lucas Munds – Fr.; 12 Stanton Weber – (redshirt) Fr.; 13 Steven West – Fr.; 14 Curry Sexton – So.; 16 Tyler Lockett – So.; 17 Logan Stephens – Jr.; 21 Destin Mosley – Fr.; 22 Zach McFall – Sr.; 23 Collin Sexton – Fr.; 25 Dylan Veatch – So.; 26 Cody Harrison – So.; 30 Stanton Weber – Fr.; 81 Kyle Klein – (redshirt) Fr.; 82 Evan Loomis – Jr.; 84 Deante Burton – Fr.; 86 Tramaine Thompson – Jr.; 87 Andre Jackson – Jr.; 88 Torell Miller – Jr.; Tight ends: 18 Andre McDonald – Jr.; 34 Darnell Howard – So.; 41 Logan Haug – Fr.; 43 Matt Pestinger – Jr.; 47 William Green – (redshirt) Jr.; 80 Travis Tannahill – Sr.; 81 Jeremy Sutton – Jr.; 82 Tyler Davidson – Fr.; 84 Curtis Hubbell – Jr.; 85 Zach Trujillo – So.; 89 Zach Nemechek – Fr.	Offensive line: 46 Dalton Converse – So. (long snapper); 50 Nick Puetz – Sr.; 51 Cameron McLain – Fr.; 52 John McClure – Fr.; 55 Cody Whitehair – (redshirt) Fr.; 61 Drew Liddle – So.; 63 Marcus Heit – Jr. (long snapper); 64 Tomasi Mariner -So.; 65 Matt Kleinsorge – (redshirt) Fr.; 66 B. J. Finney – So.; 68 William Cooper – Jr.; 70 Will Ash – Fr.; 71 Ethan Douglas – Sr.; 72 Aderius Epps – Fr.; 73 Tavon Rooks – Jr.; 74 Kason Hostrup – (redshirt) Fr.; 75 Ellwood Clement – Jr.; 76 Cory Cheadle – Fr. (long snapper); 77 Boston Stiverson – (redshirt) Fr.; 78 Cornelius Lucas – Jr.; 79 Keneen Taylor – Jr.; Defensive line: 41 Logan Haug – (redshirt) Fr.; 42 Meshak Williams – Sr.; 43 Wyatt Schroeder – Fr.; 44 Ryan Mueller – So.; 45 Marquel Bryant – (redshirt) Fr.; 54 Taylor Godinet – So.; 55 Adam Davis – Jr.; 56 Wesley Hollingshed – Jr.; 60 Dustin Sobieraj – Jr.; 62 Logan Wiltfong – Fr.; 69 Logan O'Dea – Fr.; 73 Xavier Gates – (redshirt) Fr.; 90 Laton Dowling – So.; 91 Hakeem Akinola – Jr.; 92 Vai Lutui – Sr.; 94 Alauna Finau – Jr.; 95 Travis Britz – Fr.; 96 Jon Sua – Sr.; 97 Demonte Hood – Fr.; 98 Chaquil Reed – Jr.; 99 Javonta Boyd – Sr.	Linebackers: 2 Justin Tuggle – Sr.; 4 Arthur Brown – (redshirt) Sr.; 6 Tate Snyder – So.; 20 Riley Williams – Fr.; 21 Jonathan Truman – Fr.; 26 Jarell Childs – Sr.; 32 Roman Fields – Sr.; 33 Weston Hiebert – Fr.; 34 Cody Marley – So.; 35 David Smith – So.; 36 Nick Briney – Sr.; 40 Antonio Felder – Jr.; 47 Jared Loomis – Sr.; 49 Will Davis – Fr.; 50 Tre Walker – Jr.; 51 Trace Armstrong – Fr.; 52 Mike Moore – Fr.; 53 Blake Slaughter – Sr.; 55 Kadero Terrell – Jr.; 58 Clarence Bumpas – Fr.; 57 Colborn Couchman – Fr.; 58 Myles Copeland – Fr.; 59 Aaron Norris – (redshirt) Fr.; Defensive backs: 3 Allen Chapman – Sr.; 5 Thomas Ferguson – Sr.; 7 Kip Daily – (redshirt) Jr.; 10 Donny Starks – Fr.; 12 Ty Zimmerman – Jr.; 15 Randall Evans – So.; 17 Weston Hiebert – So.; 18 Jonathan Coleman – (redshirt) Fr.; 19 Carl Miles Jr. – Jr.; 22 Dante Barnett – Fr.; 23 Jarard Milo – Sr.; 24 Nigel Malone – Sr.; 25 Joseph Bonugli – So.; 27 Ed Brown – So.; 29 Kent Gainous – Jr.; 30 Dorian Roberts – (redshirt) Fr.; 32 Michael Mann – Fr.; 33 Morgan Burns – Fr.; 39 Cameron Morgan – Fr.; 40 Dylan Schellenberg – So.; Punters: 9 Ryan Doerr – Sr.; 38 Mark Krause – (redshirt) Fr.; 48 Ethan Hammes – So.; Kickers: 6 Brandon Klimek – Sr.; 8 Dillon Wilson – (redshirt) Fr.; 10 Anthony Cantele – Sr.; 14 Jack Cantele – (redshirt) Fr.; 40 Ian Patterson – Fr.

== Coaching staff ==
The following is a list of coaches at Kansas State for the 2012 season.

Name	Position	Seasons at Kansas State	Alma mater
Bill Snyder	Head coach	21	William Jewell (1963)
Tom Hayes	Defensive coordinator/Defensive Passing Game Coordinator/defensive backs	2	Iowa (1971)
Mike Cox	Linebackers	1	Idaho (1989)
Joe Bob Clements	Defensive ends	11	Kansas State (1999)
Mo Latimore	Interior Defensive Line	29	Kansas State (1976)
Sean Snyder	Associate head coach/special teams Coordinator	18	Kansas State (1994)
Dana Dimel	Co-offensive Coordinator/running backs/tight ends	15	Kansas State (1986)
Del Miller	Co-offensive Coordinator/quarterbacks	12	Central (1972)
Charlie Dickey	Offensive line	4	Arizona (1987)
Michael Smith	Wide receivers	16	Kansas State (1995)
Joe Gordon	Recruiting Operations	2	Sam Houston State (1999)
