= Avery Johnson (American football) =

American football quarterback (born 2004)

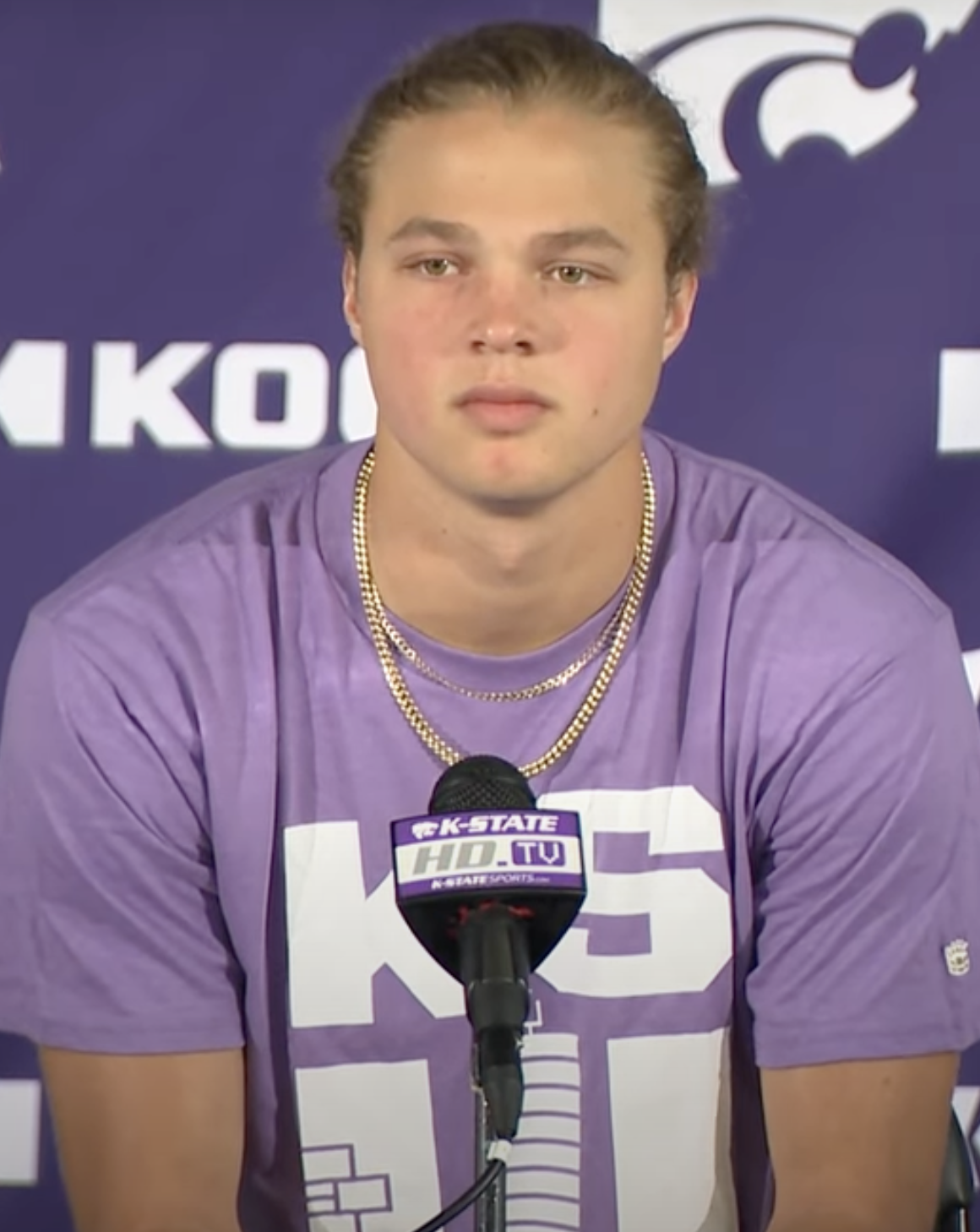
- Johnson in 2024

No. 2 – Kansas State Wildcats
- Position: Quarterback
- Class: Senior

Personal information
- Born: November 2, 2004 (age 22); Wichita, Kansas, U.S.
- Listed height: 6 ft 3 in (1.91 m)
- Listed weight: 196 lb (89 kg)

Career information
- High school: Maize (Maize, Kansas)
- College: Kansas State (2023–present)
- Stats at ESPN

Avery Johnson (born November 2, 2004) is an American college football quarterback who plays for the Kansas State Wildcats.

== Early life ==
Johnson grew up in Wichita, Kansas and attended Maize High School. He played baseball and basketball in addition to football at Maize. Johnson completed 117 of 207 pass attempts for 2,109 yards with 25 touchdown and three interceptions and also rushed for 10 touchdowns as a sophomore. He was named first team All-State after he passed for 2,549 yards and 20 touchdowns and rushed for 1,080 yards and 22 touchdowns during his junior season. Following his junior year, Johnson competed in the Elite 11 quarterback competition and was named a finalist.

As a senior, Johnson was named the Kansas Gatorade Player of the Year after completing 153-of-228 pass attempts for 2,768 yards with 29 touchdown passes and three interceptions and rushing 98 times for 817 yards and 15 touchdowns. He was also selected to play in the All-American Bowl and the Under Armour All-America Game. Johnson was rated a four-star recruit and was the consensus top prospect in the state of Kansas and committed to play college football at Kansas State over offers from Oregon and Washington.

== College career ==
=== 2023 season ===
Johnson joined the Kansas State Wildcats as an early enrollee in January 2023 in order to take part in the team's spring practices. He began the 2023 season as the backup quarterback to Will Howard. Johnson made his college debut in the Wildcats' season opener against Southeast Missouri State, where he played the final three series of the 45–0 win and completed three of four pass attempts for 55 yards and rushed five times for 32 yards and one touchdown. Johnson saw his first extensive action in Week 6 against Texas Tech, relieving Howard and completing eight of nine passes for 77 yards while rushing for 90 yards and five touchdowns, tying the school record for rushing touchdowns in a single game, as Kansas State defeated Texas Tech 38–21. He was named Big 12 Newcomer of the Week for his performance. The following week against TCU, Johnson made his first collegiate start, lining up at wide receiver in a 41–3 victory in which he threw his first collegiate touchdown pass and added 73 rushing yards. Johnson later made his first start at quarterback in the 2023 Pop-Tarts Bowl against No. 18 NC State, leading Kansas State to a 28–19 victory. He completed 14 of 31 passes for 178 yards and two touchdowns while also rushing for 71 yards and another score, earning game MVP honors.

=== 2024 season ===
With Howard transferring to Ohio State, Johnson entered the 2024 season as the starting quarterback, having won the role over former Connecticut transfer Ta'Quan Roberson during preseason competition. Johnson immediately established himself as the focal point of the offense, leading Kansas State to a 3–0 start and a No. 13 national ranking. He suffered his first setback in a 38–9 loss to BYU. Johnson rebounded the following week by helping lead an upset over No. 20 Oklahoma State, in which he recorded five total touchdowns and was named Big 12 Offensive Player of the Week, sparking a four-game winning streak. During the stretch, Kansas State climbed to a 7–1 record and a No. 16 ranking, with Johnson serving as dual-threat throughout the season. The Wildcats dropped three of their final four regular-season games to finish 8–4, but Johnson remained productive despite the late-season skid. In the 2024 Rate Bowl against Rutgers, he threw for 195 yards and three touchdowns with one interception while adding 57 rushing yards and a rushing touchdown in a 44–41 win, setting Kansas State’s single-season passing touchdowns record with 25 and finishing with the fifth-most passing yards in program history at the time. Johnson appeared in and started all 13 games, finishing the season 9–4. He completed 217 of 372 passes for 2,712 yards with 25 touchdowns and 10 interceptions, while also rushing for 605 yards and seven touchdowns.

=== 2025 season ===
Johnson returned as the starting quarterback for the 2025 season. In the Aer Lingus College Football Classic in Dublin, Ireland, against rival No. 22 Iowa State, No. 17 Kansas State was upset 24–21, despite Johnson accounting for 294 total yards and three touchdowns. The Wildcats narrowly avoided another upset the following week against FCS North Dakota, winning 38–35. Johnson threw the game-winning touchdown pass in the final minute while passing for 318 yards and three touchdowns. Following back-to-back losses to Army (who had lost to FCS Tarleton State the week prior) and Arizona by a combined six points, Kansas State dropped out of the national rankings. The team rebounded with a win over UCF, before Johnson delivered a season-high passing performance against Baylor, completing 29 of 45 passes for 344 yards with two touchdowns and one interception while also adding 72 rushing yards and a rushing touchdown. However, he threw a fourth-quarter pick-six, and Baylor went on to win 35–34 on a late game-winning field goal. He followed that with strong performances in wins over TCU and Kansas, accounting for seven total touchdowns across the two games. Kansas State then split its final four games of the season and finished 6–6, opting out of a bowl game. Five of the six losses came by a combined 14 points. Johnson appeared and started all 12 games, completing 204 of 341 passes for 2,385 yards with 18 touchdowns and six interceptions, while also rushing for 477 yards and eight touchdowns.

=== Statistics ===
Season	Team	Games			Passing								Rushing			
Season	Team	GP	GS	Record (Note: Accounts for only GS as a QB. On 10/21/23 against TCU, Johnson started at WR.)	Cmp	Att	Pct	Yds	Y/A	TD	Int	Rtg	Att	Yds	Avg	TD
2023	Kansas State	8	2	1–0	37	66	56.1	479	7.3	5	0	142.0	52	296	5.7	7
2024	Kansas State	13	13	9–4	217	372	58.3	2,712	7.3	25	10	136.4	113	605	5.4	7
2025	Kansas State	12	12	6–6	204	341	59.8	2,385	7.0	18	6	132.5	109	477	4.4	8
2026	Kansas State	6	6	4–2	118	187	63.1	1,301	7.0	10	3	136.0	51	462	9.1	3
Career		39	33	20–12	576	966	59.6	6,877	7.1	58	19	135.3	325	1,840	5.7	25
