= Matt Miller (quarterback) =

American football player (1972–2022)

Profile
- Position: Quarterback

Personal information
- Born: May 1, 1972; Provo, Utah, U.S.
- Died: January 8, 2022 (aged 49); Kansas City, Kansas, U.S.
- Listed height: 6 ft 1 in (1.85 m)
- Listed weight: 190 lb (86 kg)

Career information
- High school: Mt. Carmel (San Diego, California)
- College: Kansas State Wildcats (1992–1996)

Matthew Lee Miller (May 1, 1972 –January 8, 2022) was an American college football and baseball player, and college football coach. He was head football coach at Garden City Community College from 2013 to 2014.

Miller was the starting quarterback at Kansas State University in 1995. He took over quarterback duties at Kansas State from Chad May before surrendering his duties to Brian Kavanagh when his college career was complete.

== Playing career ==
=== High school ===
Miller was listed as one of the top 25 quarterbacks in the nation as a senior at Mount Carmel High School in San Diego, California. He was named the California High School Athlete of the Year in 1990.

=== College career ===
Miller started his career at Texas A&M before transferring to K-State in 1993.

Miller started at quarterback for K-State in 1995, helping the Wildcats to a 10-2 record and 1995 Holiday Bowl win over Colorado State. He led the team to its first 10 win season and first top 10 finish in school history. Despite numerous injuries including numerous concussions and two dislocated shoulders was a finalist for the Davey O'Brien Award after setting nearly most every single season K-State passing record at the time. He earned second team All-Big Eight honors from the Associated Press and set a Big Eight record with 22 touchdown passes. Miller set the K-State record and just missed by one completed pass the Big Eight record for highest completion percentage in a season completing 154 of 240 passes for 64.2 percent. He led the Big Eight and was fifth in the nation with another K-State record for passing efficiency (157.3). He also led the Big Eight in total offense with 215.3 yards per game and 30 combined touchdowns in 1995 is K-State record with 22 passing and eight rushing TDs. He finished his K-State career with school career records for passing efficiency (153.65), completion percentage (62.7) and yards per completion (13.3). Miller earned Big Eight Player of the Week honors after leading Wildcats to 49-10 win over Oklahoma by completing 20 of 25 passes for 273 yards and three touchdowns, while rushing for two more scores. He set a K-State record by throwing three touchdown passes in the first quarter against Akron. Several of the most memorable moments as a Wildcat were throwing a last second touchdown pass to Kevin Lockett after suffering a 3rd degree separation of his left shoulder on the second play of the game versus Cincinnati. Also, leading the Wildcats to the biggest victory in the history of the Sunflower Showdown, beating Kansas by rushing for 92 yards in the first half alone and throwing two touchdowns to break open the game to Lockett in the first quarter.

He was also an outstanding baseball player for the Wildcats, leading K-State in hitting with .318 average in 1994 to earn second team All-Big Eight honors.

== Coaching career ==
After finishing his playing career, Miller served as an assistant football coach at Kansas State from 1996 to 2006. During that time, he closely mentored Heisman Trophy runner-up Michael Bishop. He then joined the K-State staff as a full-time assistant in February 1999, after two seasons as a graduate assistant. He coached Shad Meier in 2000, helping Meier to a season in which he was a third-round draft pick of the Tennessee Titans.

== Education ==
He earned his bachelor's degree in social science from Kansas State in 1996.

== Death ==
Miller died of prostate cancer on January 8, 2022. He was 49 years old.
