= Kevin Lockett =

American football player (born 1974)

No. 81, 83, 85, 89
- Position: Wide receiver

Personal information
- Born: September 8, 1974 (age 52); Tulsa, Oklahoma, U.S.
- Listed height: 6 ft 0 in (1.83 m)
- Listed weight: 182 lb (83 kg)

Career information
- High school: Booker T. Washington (Tulsa)
- College: Kansas State
- NFL draft: 1997: 2nd round, 47th overall pick

Career history
- Kansas City Chiefs (1997–2000); Washington Redskins (2001–2002); Jacksonville Jaguars (2002); New York Jets (2003)

Awards and highlights
- Third-team All-American (1996); First-team All-Big 12 (1996); First-team All-Big Eight (1995); 2× Second-team All-Big Eight (1993, 1994)

Career NFL statistics
- Receptions: 130
- Receiving yards: 1,738
- Touchdowns: 8
- Stats at Pro Football Reference

Kevin Eugene Lockett (born September 8, 1974) is an American former professional football player who was a wide receiver and punt returner in the National Football League (NFL) for the Kansas City Chiefs, Washington Redskins, Jacksonville Jaguars and New York Jets. He played college football for the Kansas State Wildcats, where he was a football and Academic All-American. He went to high school at Booker T. Washington High School in Tulsa.

== College ==
Lockett broke the school career touchdown receptions record in the same game that head coach Bill Snyder set the record for most career wins by a Kansas State football coach on September 30, 1995, for the Kansas State Wildcats. Prior to the formation of the Big 12 Conference in 1996, the Kansas State Wildcats competed in the Big Eight Conference. As a member of the 1996 Wildcats, he led the Big 12 Conference in receptions per game. He was a 1996 All-Big 12 Conference first-team wide receiver. He was a 1996 first-team Academic All-Big 12 selection. On special teams, he made the first blocked kick in Big 12 Conference history on August 31, 1996.

He established the following Kansas State school records: career receptions (217, 1993–96), career receiving yards (3032, 1993–96) - broken 1998 by Tyler Lockett, career receiving touchdowns (26, 1993–96), single-game receptions by a freshman (8, 11/20/93), single-season receiving yards by a freshman (770, 1998) - broken 1998 by Aaron Lockett, single-season receptions by a freshman (50, 1993), career 100-yard receiving games (9, 1993–96)-broken 2000 by Quincy Morgan, single-season receptions (72, 1996) - broken 1998 by Darnell McDonald, and single-season receiving touchdowns (13, 1995) - broken 2000 by Morgan. He led Kansas State in the following statistics, receptions (1993, 50; 1995, 56; 1996, 72), receiving yards (1993, 770; 1994, 583; 1995, 797; 1996, 882), and scoring (78, 1995). He also earned Academic All-America distinctions in 1995 and 1996.

== Professional career ==
Pre-draft measurables
Height	Weight	Arm length	Hand span	40-yard dash	10-yard split	20-yard split	20-yard shuttle	Three-cone drill	Vertical jump
5 ft 11 7/8 in (1.83 m)	171 lb (78 kg)	33 1/4 in (0.84 m)	8 5/8 in (0.22 m)	4.57 s	1.58 s	2.62 s	3.93 s	6.88 s	36.5 in (0.93 m)
All values from NFL Combine

=== Kansas City Chiefs ===
The Kansas City Chiefs selected Lockett in the second round of the 1997 NFL draft with the 47th overall selection. As a rookie, his only reception came in a November 23, 1997, contest against Seattle for the Chiefs who went 13–3. This was the only playoff team that he played for. In 1998, he caught 19 passes for 281 yards, followed by the best year of his career with 34 receptions for 426 yards and two touchdowns for the 1999 Chiefs, and then 33 receptions for 422 yards and two touchdowns for the 2000 Chiefs. In week 4 of the 2000 NFL season, he made a key third down reception on the clinching drive of the game as Elvis Grbac engineered an 8-play 80-yard drive to earn a 23–22 victory over Denver. His highest single-game yardage total came in week 9 of the 2000 season when he totaled 77 yards, including a first half touchdown against Seattle. That season, he tallied 7 receptions the following week for 57 yards and then he became the regular punt returner for the rest of the season, totaling 24 returns in the final 7 games.

=== Washington Redskins ===
Following the 2000 season, he signed a two-year contract with the Washington Redskins. Although he was the third receiver with the Redskins for the 2001 season, he was considered a receiver who demanded coverage from one of the opposition's top defenders. His production slipped in the 2001 season, only recording 22 receptions for 293 yards with zero touchdowns, but he completed his only pass attempt for a 31-yard touchdown to Derrius Thompson after receiving a backwards pass from Tony Banks. On November 1, he was released by the Redskins after being benched for two games from a costly fumble during a game between the Green Bay Packers, tallying 11 receptions (including two touchdowns) for 129 yards, and a second touchdown pass making him two-for-two.

=== Jacksonville Jaguars ===
Lockett signed with the Jacksonville Jaguars two days after his release from the Redskins, and had five receptions (including two touchdowns) in his seven games for the team. Although less productive in terms of yards and receptions, the 2002 NFL season gave Lockett his career-high 4 touchdown receptions (and a touchdown pass). He re-signed with Jacksonville in the spring of 2003, but did not play any games for the Jaguars.

=== New York Jets ===
Lockett was signed by the New York Jets in mid-November. Lockett spent four weeks on the practice squad before being activated for the final three games in which he made 5 receptions for 76 yards.

== Personal life ==
His son Tyler is a wide receiver, most recently for the Las Vegas Raiders. Another son, Sterling was offered a scholarship to Kansas State for their 2022 recruitment class, and announced his commitment on January 1, 2021. His younger brother Aaron played for the Canadian Football League for three seasons.

== See also ==
- Kansas State Wildcats football statistical leaders
