= Aaron Lockett (gridiron football) =

American football player (born 1978)

Profile
- Position: Wide receiver

Personal information
- Born: September 6, 1978 (age 48); Tulsa, Oklahoma, U.S.
- Listed height: 5 ft 7 in (1.70 m)
- Listed weight: 163 lb (74 kg)

Career information
- High school: Booker T. Washington (Tulsa)
- College: Kansas State
- NFL draft: 2002: 7th round, 254th overall pick

Career history
- 2002: Tampa Bay Buccaneers*
- 2002–2003: San Francisco 49ers*
- 2004: Ottawa Renegades
- 2004–2006: BC Lions
- * Offseason or practice squad member only

Awards and highlights
- Professional: 2005 CFL return yards leader; 2006 CFL Grey Cup champions with the BC Lions; Collegiate: NCAA punt return average leader (2000); Second-team All-American (2000); First-team All-Big 12 (2000); 2× Second-team All-Big 12 (1999, 2001); OSSAA Championships: 1994 4 × 100 metres relay; 1995 basketball; 1997 100 metres; Big 12 Conference records: Single-season punt return average (2000–); Longest pass reception (1998–); Kansas State Wildcats (football) records: Career all-purpose yards (2001–04); Freshman season receiving yards (1998–); Consecutive 100-yard receiving games (1998–2007); Longest play from scrimmage (1998–); Kansas State Wildcats (track) records: 60 metres (1999–2001)

Aaron DaRon Lockett (born September 6, 1978) is an American former professional football player who was a wide receiver and return specialist in the National Football League (NFL) for the Tampa Bay Buccaneers, San Francisco 49ers, and the Canadian Football League (CFL) for the Ottawa Renegades and BC Lions. He played college football at Kansas State University where he set school and Big 12 Conference football and track and field records. His brother Kevin Lockett and nephew Tyler Lockett also played wide receiver at Kansas State where they also set records.

Lockett led the nation in punt return average for the 2000 NCAA Division I-A football season and was a second-team All-American. As of December 2011, he held the Big 12 Conference records for single-season punt return average (22.8) and longest pass reception (97 yards) as well as Kansas State Wildcats records for Freshman receiving yards and the longest play from scrimmage. He was a four-time All-Big 12 selection and formerly held Kansas State records for career all-purpose yards and consecutive 100-yard receiving games.

As a track and field athlete, he is a former Oklahoma Secondary School Activities Association (OSSAA) champion in both the 4 × 100 metres relay and the 100 metres, a former Kansas State Wildcats 60 metres record holder and one of the fastest NFL Combine 40-yard dash participants of all-time.

His professional career involved several short stints that included most of a season on the taxi squad for the 2002 49ers of the NFL and a few years with the BC Lions of the CFL. In his most productive professional season, he led the CFL in return yards for the 2005 CFL season.

== College career ==
On September 26, 1998, Michael Bishop connected with Lockett on a 97-yard touchdown against University of Louisiana at Monroe to set the Big 12 Conference record for longest pass reception. Lockett led the nation in punt return average with 22.8 yards and 3 touchdowns in 22 punt returns in 2000, according to National Collegiate Athletic Association record books, although Big 12 record books claim he finished second in the nation. The average led the Big 12, and it still stands as the Big 12 Conference single-season record. That season, he was a second-team All-American selection by the Associated Press. His 58-yard punt return touchdown in the 2000 Big 12 Championship Game tied the score in the third quarter. In 2001, he was an honorable mention All-American selection by CNN Sports Illustrated.

Lockett was a 1998 All-Big 12 Conference honorable mention wide receiver, 1999 All-Big 12 Conference second-team wide receiver, 2000 All-Big 12 Conference first-team punt returner, 2001 All-Big 12 Conference second-team kickoff returner. He was a four-time Big 12 Conference Special Teams player of the week: August 26 – September 2, 2000, September 16, 2000, November 18, 2000, and September 20–22 2001.

He established the following Kansas State Wildcats football records:

- single-game receiving yards by a freshman (188 yards on September 26, 1998) single-season receiving yards by a freshman (928, 1998),
- consecutive 100-yard receiving games (3 games, October 31 – November 14, 1998) — broken in 2007 by Jordy Nelson,
- career all-purpose yards (4023 yards, 1998–2001) — broken in 2004 by Darren Sproles
- single-season punt return average (22.8 yards in 2000)
- longest play from scrimmage (97 yards on September 26, 1998)

He led Kansas State in the following statistics:

- receptions (24 in 2001)
- receiving yards (357 yards in 2001)
- all-purpose yards (1,459 yards in 2000)

In track, placed 4th and 5th in the 60 metres at the 1998 and 2000 Big 12 Indoor Track & Field Championships and set the Kansas State record of 6.69 seconds in the 1999 event. In 2001, Terence Newman broke the record when he ran a 6.67, and in 2002 Newman set the current school record of 6.62. Lockett's time of 21.48 seconds in 2000 was second in school history in the 200 metres at the time. Lockett has one of the fastest 40-yard dash times at the NFL Combine since 2000 when times began being recorded electronically with fully automatic time electronic timing.

== Professional career ==
=== NFL ===
Pre-draft measurables
Height	Weight	Arm length	Hand span	40-yard dash	10-yard split	20-yard split	20-yard shuttle	Three-cone drill	Vertical jump	Broad jump
5 ft 7 3/8 in (1.71 m)	155 lb (70 kg)	29 in (0.74 m)	7 1/8 in (0.18 m)	4.31 s	1.54 s	2.55 s	4.11 s	6.84 s	35.0 in (0.89 m)	9 ft 11 in (3.02 m)
All values from NFL Combine

Lockett was selected in the seventh round with the 254th overall pick in the 2002 NFL draft by the Tampa Bay Buccaneers as a compensatory selection. He signed with the 2002 Buccaneers in July of that year. The team released him at the end of training camp. He spent much of the 2002 NFL season on the taxi squad for the San Francisco 49ers, who signed him on October 1, released him on November 19, signed him on November 27, and re-signed him for 2003 the following February. They released him in training camp in 2003.

=== CFL ===
In 2004, Lockett signed with the Ottawa Renegades. At some point in the season, he became a member of the 2004 BC Lions that played in the 92nd Grey Cup. During the 2005 CFL season for the BC Lions, he fielded 61 kickoff returns, which as of 2011 was tied for fourth all-time in league history. That season, he led the CFL in return yards and became a Rogers CFL Player Awards nominee. He was released by the Lions after the 2006 CFL season after return blocking rule changes rendered him ineffective.

== Personal ==
Lockett's brother Kevin Lockett held the Kansas State career receiving record, which was surpassed by his nephew Tyler Lockett on November 8, 2014. His nephew is also the only Kansas State player to return kickoffs for touchdowns in consecutive games. His parents are John and Beatrice Lockett. He is an accomplished rapper.
