= Andrew Shull =

American football player (born 1981)

No. 61
- Position: Defensive end

Personal information
- Listed height: 6 ft 5 in (1.96 m)
- Listed weight: 265 lb (120 kg)

Career information
- College: Kansas State

Career history
- 2004: Detroit Lions*
- * Offseason or practice squad member only

Andrew Shull (born April 2, 1981) is a former professional American football defensive end in the National Football League. He played for the Detroit Lions on their practice squad.

== Early life ==
Shull was born in Webb City, Missouri. He attended Webb City High School and helped Cardinals to 14–0 record and state title in 1997. He was recently inducted into the Webb City High School Athletic Hall of Fame.

== College career ==
Shull ended his career at Kansas State with 150 tackles (39 for losses), 20 sacks, 15 deflected passes, five forced fumbles, three fumbles recovered and a blocked kick. He led the team in sacks in 2002 and 2003 and currently ranks sixth in school history in sacks.

== Professional career ==
Shull measured 6'4½" and 265 pounds and ran a 40-yard dash in 4.87.

Shull was undrafted in 2004 but was signed by the Detroit Lions as a free agent on April 26, 2004. Shull was then resigned to be practice squad for the 2004 season.
