= Ell Roberson =

American gridiron football player (born 1980)

No. 11
- Position: Quarterback

Personal information
- Born: August 13, 1980 (age 46); Baytown, Texas, U.S.
- Listed height: 6 ft 1 in (1.85 m)
- Listed weight: 205 lb (93 kg)

Career information
- High school: Robert E. Lee
- College: Kansas State
- NFL draft: 2005: undrafted

Career history
- Montreal Alouettes (2004–2006)

Ell Roberson III (born August 13, 1980) is an American former football quarterback. Roberson played in college at Kansas State University and had a brief career with the Montreal Alouettes in the Canadian Football League (CFL). He was the starting quarterback at K-State from 2001 to 2003, before starting a career in the CFL.

== College career ==
After a standout career at Robert E. Lee High School in Baytown, Texas, Roberson was a top recruit of Kansas State and Bill Snyder, who was an advocate of fast, mobile quarterbacks. He is in the Kansas State record books for several achievements, including ranking fourth on the single season quarterback rating of 143.2 in 2003 and he is also sixth with a rating of 136.5 in 2002. He also holds the school record for touchdown passes in a season, with 24 in 2003.

=== 2000 ===
In 2000 Roberson played sparingly, taking over at one point for a poorly performing Jonathan Beasley.

=== 2001 ===
In 2001, Roberson split time with Marc Dunn, the Wildcats finished with a 6–6 record.

=== 2002 ===
On September 21, 2002, Roberson came off the bench and had 204 total yards and 4 touchdowns as #25 Kansas State upset #11 USC 27–20. Roberson, who coach Snyder had told the media he'd grade " somewhere between average and C-minus", was named the starter after the game.

Roberson led the Wildcats to a successful season, winning the 2002 Holiday Bowl against Arizona State and finishing #6 in the polls.

=== 2003 ===
In 2003, the Wildcats entered the season ranked #7 in the top 25, in part due to the strong play by Roberson and running back Darren Sproles.

During the third game of the season against McNeese State, Roberson suffered a hand injury and missed a month of playing time. Kansas State was upset by Marshall during one of the games Roberson missed, and Roberson's injury held back his performance once he returned, leading to three consecutive losses and Kansas State dropping out of the top 25 entirely. However, they recovered and won 6 games in a row and earned a berth to the 2003 Big 12 Championship Game against #1 Oklahoma. The Wildcats won 35–7, Roberson was named the Most Valuable Player of the game, completing 10 of 17 passes with no interceptions and four touchdown passes, which accounted for all Kansas State offensive scores in the game. He also rushed 17 times for 62 yards. The win earned the Wildcats a berth in the 2004 Fiesta Bowl.

==== 2004 Fiesta Bowl controversy ====
In the early morning hours of New Year's Day, 2004, police were called to the Kansas State team hotel in Paradise Valley, Arizona, by a woman who accused Roberson of sexually assaulting her. Roberson and the rest of the Kansas State team were in town to play Ohio State in the Fiesta Bowl. Police did not arrest Roberson, and later determined that no crime had been committed and no charges should be filed, but an investigation by the Kansas State athletic department concluded that Roberson and several other players had violated unspecified team rules. As a result, Roberson was stripped of his scholarship by head coach Bill Snyder. Snyder decided this after the bowl game, which the Wildcats lost 35–28.

== Canadian football ==
Roberson went undrafted in the 2005 NFL Draft.

Roberson played quarterback in the Canadian Football League with the Montreal Alouettes, where he was a third-string quarterback in 2005 and then in 2006 became a wide receiver. In 2005, his rookie season in the CFL, Roberson tore his rotator cuff and was out for the season. He was released from the team in 2006.
