= Alex Barnes =

American football player (born 1996)

No. 39
- Position: Running back

Personal information
- Born: October 27, 1996 (age 30); Coffeyville, Kansas, U.S.
- Listed height: 6 ft 0 in (1.83 m)
- Listed weight: 226 lb (103 kg)

Career information
- High school: Pittsburg (KS)
- College: Kansas State
- NFL draft: 2019: undrafted

Career history
- Tennessee Titans (2019)*
- * Offseason or practice squad member only

Awards and highlights
- Second-team All-Big 12 (2018)
- Stats at Pro Football Reference

Brandon Alex Barnes (born October 27, 1996) is an American former football running back. He played college football at Kansas State University.

== Early life ==
Barnes attended Pittsburg High School in Pittsburg, Kansas. As a senior at Pittsburg in 2014, he rushed for 2,361 yards and 38 touchdowns. He committed to play college football at Kansas State University, choosing them over the University of Minnesota, University of Kansas, and Rutgers University.

== College career ==
Barnes redshirted as a freshman at Kansas State in 2015.

As a redshirt freshman in 2016, Barnes broke out and rushed for 442 yards and six touchdowns on 56 carries in 11 games.

Barnes' break out continued as a redshirt sophomore in 2017. He started all 13 of Kansas State's games and rushed for 819 yards and seven touchdowns on 146 carries along with catching five passes for 29 yards and throwing a touchdown pass. However, Barnes suffered ankle pain throughout the season which limited his workload.

In 2018, as a redshirt junior, Barnes was the Big 12 Conference's leading rusher with 1,355 yards with 12 touchdowns on 256 carries in 12 games. He was named to the All-Big 12 football team. After the season, Barnes decided to forego his senior year to pursue a career in the NFL.

== Professional career ==
Pre-draft measurables
Height	Weight	Arm length	Hand span	40-yard dash	10-yard split	20-yard split	20-yard shuttle	Three-cone drill	Vertical jump	Broad jump	Bench press
6 ft 0 3/8 in (1.84 m)	226 lb (103 kg)	31 in (0.79 m)	10 in (0.25 m)	4.59 s	1.58 s	2.68 s	4.10 s	6.95 s	38.5 in (0.98 m)	10 ft 6 in (3.20 m)	34 reps
All values from NFL Combine

Barnes was signed by the Tennessee Titans as an undrafted free agent on May 9, 2019. He was waived on August 31, 2019.
