= Jaime Mendez (American football) =

American football player (born 1971)

No. 32
- Position: Free safety

Personal information
- Born: February 20, 1971 (age 55); Youngstown, Ohio, U.S.
- Listed height: 6 ft 0 in (1.83 m)
- Listed weight: 200 lb (91 kg)

Career information
- High school: Cardinal Mooney (Youngstown, Ohio)
- College: Kansas State Wildcats (1990–1993)

Awards and highlights
- First-team All-American (1993); 2× First-team All-Big Eight (1992–1993); Kansas State Hall of Fame (2013)

Jaime Mendez (born February 20, 1971) is a former American collegiate football free safety, who was an All-American at Kansas State University. He is the Wildcats' all-time career leader in interceptions with 15.

== High school ==
Mendez was an all-state selection at Cardinal Mooney, the same school that produced former Wildcat co-defensive coordinator Bob Stoops and former defensive ends coach Mike Stoops. His coach was Don Bucci. He helped high school team register eight shutouts in 1987 en route to a 13–1 record and the Division III state title. Jaime's greatest game was his only loss that year but was in double overtime against Elvis Grbac - 1988 Desmond Howard-1988.(both of Cleveland St. Joe's) Cardinal Mooney also captured the league title in 1988. Mendez was a sprinter on the high school track team along with serving as all seniors at Cardinal Mooney do as a football team captain.

== College career ==
After redshirting in 1989, Mendez tied the K-State season record with six interceptions and broke the school standard for interception return yardage with 154 yards as a redshirt freshmen in 1990. He was an honorable mention All-Big 8, as well as newcomer of the year. He was ninth nationally in interceptions. As a sophomore in 1991, he earned first team All-Big 8 as well as being named third-team All-American. He finished third on the team with 79 tackles and fourth in the Big 8 with nine passes broken up. As a junior in 1992, he earned consensus first-team All-Big Eight honors as well as honorable mention All-American honors. He set a modern-day Big 8 record and school record with four interceptions in a win over Temple, including three in the first half. As a senior in 1993, he again earned consensus first-team All-American honors and earned first-team All-Big Eight once again. He was one of eight semifinalists for the Jim Thorpe Award He was named team's co-MVP and co-captained team to a 9–2–1 record and the school's first bowl victory in a 52–17 blowout against Wyoming in the 1993 Copper Bowl.

=== Career statistics ===
Year	Team	G	Tkl	Ast	Int
1990	Kansas State	11	40	20	6
1991	Kansas State	11	79	32	1
1992	Kansas State	11	67	26	6
1993	Kansas State	11	127	58	2
	Career Totals	44	313	136	15

== Personal life ==
Mendez, who is of Puerto Rican descent, was married to actress Essence Atkins on September 26, 2009 and divorced in 2016. They have a child.
