= Ryan Mueller =

American football player (born 1991)

No. 40
- Positions: Defensive end Fullback

Personal information
- Born: April 30, 1991 (age 35); Morristown, New Jersey, U.S.
- Listed height: 6 ft 2 in (1.88 m)
- Listed weight: 250 lb (113 kg)

Career information
- High school: Saint Thomas Aquinas (Overland Park, Kansas)
- College: Kansas State
- NFL draft: 2015: undrafted

Career history
- San Diego Chargers (2015)*; Philadelphia Eagles (2016)*; Hamilton Tiger-Cats (2017); New York Guardians (2020); Arlington Renegades (2023); Vegas Vipers (2023); Arlington Renegades (2023); San Antonio Brahmas (2024)*
- * Offseason or practice squad member only

Awards and highlights
- XFL champion (2023); Big 12 Defensive Lineman of the Year (2013); Second-team All-American (2013); 2× First-team All-Big 12 (2013, 2014)
- Stats at Pro Football Reference
- Stats at CFL.ca

Ryan Mueller (born April 30, 1991) is an American former professional football defensive end and fullback. He played college football for the Kansas State Wildcats. He has played for the San Diego Chargers and Philadelphia Eagles of the National Football League (NFL), the Hamilton Tiger-Cats of the Canadian Football League (CFL), the New York Guardians and the Vegas Vipers and Arlington Renegades of the XFL.

== Early life ==
Mueller played high school football at Saint Thomas Aquinas High School. Mueller was named the Eastern Kansas League Defensive Player of the Year, as well as the Kansas City Metro Defensive Player of the Year. He was a first team all-state honoree as he led the Saints to a 9–2 record and a state runner-up finish.

Mueller also played basketball and track.

== College career ==
Mueller began his Division I NCAA college football career at Kansas State University as an unrecruited walk-on, and went on to become an All-American 4-year letterman starter and team captain.

Mueller redshirted his freshman season in 2010.

In 2011, Mueller played 13 games, recording half a sack.

In 2012, Mueller played in 14 games, recording 14 tackles and 2 sacks.

In 2013, Mueller was a Second Team All-American performer by the Football Writers Association of America (FWAA) after tying the school record for sacks with 11.5. He was also named the Big 12 Defensive Lineman of the Year in 2013. and was named First Team All-Big 12. He was also a candidate for the Ted Hendricks Award. Mueller also tied the schools single game sack record vs Texas Tech with 3 sacks.

In 2014, Mueller started all 13 games, and was named First Team All-Big 12. He was also an honorable mention for the Big 12 Defensive Lineman of the Year award, and was once again a candidate for the Ted Hendricks Award.

Mueller currently ranks 5th in school history in career sacks. Mueller finished his collegiate career with a total of 39 games played, recording 116 total tackles, 16.5 sack, 4 pass deflections, and 2 forced fumbles.

Kansas State Wildcats football head coach Bill Snyder said this about Mueller:

"Nobody plays harder than Ryan Mueller. Nobody. Nobody works harder than Ryan Mueller. Nobody."

— Bill Snyder, Head Football Coach at Kansas State University (December 24, 2013)

== Professional career ==
=== San Diego Chargers ===
After going Undrafted in the 2015 NFL draft, Mueller signed with the San Diego Chargers as an undrafted free agent on May 2, 2015. He was released on September 5, 2015, but was resigned to the practice squad the next day. On November 4, 2015, Mueller was released from the practice squad

=== Philadelphia Eagles ===
On April 1, 2016, Mueller signed a two-year contract with the Philadelphia Eagles as a fullback, where he played in high school and occasionally in college. Mueller was released on May 3, 2016.

=== Hamilton Tiger-Cats ===
Mueller signed with the Hamilton Tiger-Cats of the Canadian Football League on April 17, 2017. He was released during final roster cuts on June 18, but was re-signed to the team's practice roster on August 14. He was promoted to the active roster on October 5, but was moved back down to the practice roster on October 31. He was signed to a future contract on November 4. He was transferred to the retired list on April 26, 2018. After the 2018 season, he was removed from the retired list on February 20, 2019, when his contract expired.

=== New York Guardians ===
On October 16, 2019, Mueller was drafted by the New York Guardians in the open phase of the 2020 XFL draft. He was credited with the Defensive Play of the Year after batting a pass up into the air and then catching it, breaking two tackle attempts, and returning it 33 yards for a touchdown in a team win vs the Dallas Renegades 30–12 on March 7, 2020. Mueller had his contract terminated when the league suspended operations on April 10, 2020.

=== Arlington Renegades (first stint) ===
Mueller was selected by the Arlington Renegades of the XFL on November 17, 2022. He was released during the final wave of roster cuts, but re-signed on March 15, 2023.

=== Vegas Vipers ===
On March 28, 2023, Mueller was traded to the Vegas Vipers in exchange for Vipers' quarterback Luis Perez. He was released on April 4, 2023.

=== Arlington Renegades (second stint) ===
After being released by Vegas, Mueller was claimed by the Renegades on April 4, 2023, marking his second stint with the team. He was not part of the roster after the 2024 UFL dispersal draft on January 15, 2024.

=== San Antonio Brahmas ===
On January 31, 2024, Mueller was signed by the San Antonio Brahmas of the UFL. He was released on March 10, 2024.

== Personal ==
He is the son of Steve and Valerie Mueller and has two sisters, Katheryn and Caroline.
