= Quincy Morgan =

American football player (born 1977)

No. 81, 11
- Position: Wide receiver

Personal information
- Born: September 23, 1977 (age 49); Garland, Texas, U.S.
- Listed height: 6 ft 1 in (1.85 m)
- Listed weight: 215 lb (98 kg)

Career information
- High school: South Garland
- College: Kansas State
- NFL draft: 2001: 2nd round, 33rd overall pick

Career history
- Cleveland Browns (2001–2004); Dallas Cowboys (2004); Pittsburgh Steelers (2005); Denver Broncos (2006)

Awards and highlights
- Super Bowl champion (XL); First-team All-American (2000); 2× First-team All-Big 12 (1999, 2000)

Career NFL statistics
- Games played: 86
- Receptions: 164
- Receiving yards: 2,466
- Receiving touchdowns: 17
- Stats at Pro Football Reference

Quincy Demond Earl Morgan (born September 23, 1977) is an American former professional football player who was a wide receiver in the National Football League (NFL) for the Cleveland Browns, Dallas Cowboys, Pittsburgh Steelers, and Denver Broncos. He played college football for the Kansas State Wildcats, earning first-team All-American honors in 2000. With the Steelers, he won Super Bowl XL over the Seattle Seahawks.

== Early life ==
Morgan attended South Garland High School in Garland, Texas. In football, he was a three-year letterman. As a junior, he was named All-State by The Dallas Morning News. As a senior, he received Team's Most Valuable Player, All-Area, All-Conference, All-State and prep All-American honors.

== College career ==
Morgan enrolled at Kansas City Kansas Community College during the spring of 1998, where he ran track. He transferred to Blinn Community College at the end of the year. As a freshman, he helped the team win the Junior College National Championship. As a sophomore, he had 38 receptions for 645 yards, 9 touchdowns and was considered one of the top wide receivers in Junior College. He transferred to Kansas State University after the season.

As a junior, he posted 42 receptions for 1,007 yards, a 24-yard average (school record) and 9 touchdowns. As a senior, he registered 64 receptions (fifth in school history) for 1,166 yards (school record), an 18.2-yard average and 14 touchdowns (school record).

Morgan finished his college career with 106 receptions (sixth in school history), 2,173 yards (third in school history), a 20.5-yard average (school record) and 23 touchdowns (second in school history). He became one of only seven KSU players to catch more than one hundred passes, one of only four players with more than 2,000 receiving yards, second with eight 100-yard games. He was also the only Wildcat to notch 1,000 receiving yards in two consecutive seasons.

== Professional career ==
=== Cleveland Browns ===
Morgan was selected by the Cleveland Browns in the second round (33rd overall) of the 2001 NFL draft. As a rookie, he passed Dennis Northcutt on the depth chart and started 9 games. He made 30 receptions for 432 yards and 2 touchdowns. Late in the season, against the Jacksonville Jaguars, Morgan was involved in a controversial ruling when he bobbled a fourth-down pass from Tim Couch; although Couch subsequently spiked the ball on the next play, officials reviewed Morgan's catch afterward and ruled he did not have possession of the ball. The verdict prompted angry Browns fans to throw beer bottles onto the field in an incident dubbed "Bottlegate".

In 2002, he had his best season as a professional, recording 56 receptions for 964 yards, a 17.2-yard average (led the NFL) and 7 touchdowns, while helping the team make the playoffs. In the season opener against the Kansas City Chiefs, he had 9 receptions for 151 yards and 2 touchdowns, but his effort was lost after linebacker Dwayne Rudd committed what is known in Browns lore as "Helmetgate", after taking off his helmet to celebrate with less than 10 seconds left on the clock and the Browns clinging to a 39–37 lead, which drew a critical unsportsmanlike conduct penalty. His most memorable catch was a Hail Mary touchdown reception with no time left against the Jacksonville Jaguars on December 8, sealing a 21–20 win.

In 2003, he started 15 games, collecting 38 receptions for 516 yards and 3 touchdowns.

In 2004, he started 5 games, collecting 9 receptions for 144 yards and 3 touchdowns. On October 19, he was traded to the Dallas Cowboys in exchange for wide receiver Antonio Bryant, following a public dispute between Bryant and Cowboys head coach Bill Parcells.

=== Dallas Cowboys ===
In 2004, Morgan would have a rather mediocre season with the Cowboys in 2004, despite his rapid elevation on the depth chart following an injury to Terry Glenn, finishing with 22 receptions for 260 yards. In 2005, Morgan performed poorly in an unexpected depth chart battle against second-year player Patrick Crayton and Parcells began to perceive him as uncompetitive, dropping him to fourth on the depth chart. He was released in order for the Cowboys to pick up wide receiver Peerless Price off waivers on September 5.

=== Pittsburgh Steelers ===
On September 6, 2005, he was signed by the Pittsburgh Steelers, reuniting with former Browns offensive coordinator Bruce Arians. He was mostly used to return kickoffs, ranking fifth in the AFC with 23 returns for 583 yards and a 25.3-yard average. He also had 9 receptions for 150 yards and 2 touchdowns. He suffered a fractured fibula in the first-round playoff game against the Cincinnati Bengals, missing the rest of the playoff run towards Super Bowl XL, which the Steelers won. He was released on September 2, 2006.

=== Denver Broncos ===
On September 18, 2006, he signed as a free agent with the Denver Broncos to return kickoffs. He appeared in 7 games, registering 17 returns for 423 yards and a 24.9-yard average. He was released on September 1, 2007.

== Career statistics ==
=== NFL ===
Legend
	Led the league
**Bold**	Career high

==== Regular season ====
Year	Team	Games		Receiving					
Year	Team	GP	GS	Tgt	Rec	Yds	Avg	Lng	TD
2001	CLE	**16**	9	72	30	432	14.4	**78**	2
2002	CLE	**16**	**16**	**97**	**56**	**964**	**17.2**	**78**	**7**
2003	CLE	**16**	15	79	38	516	13.6	71	3
2004	CLE	6	5	21	9	144	16.0	46	3
2004	DAL	9	7	47	22	260	11.8	53	0
2005	PIT	**16**	0	18	9	150	16.7	31	2
2006	DEN	7	0	0	0	0	0.0	0	0
		86	52	334	164	2,466	15.0	78	17

==== Playoffs ====
Year	Team	Games		Receiving					
Year	Team	GP	GS	Tgt	Rec	Yds	Avg	Lng	TD
2002	CLE	**1**	**1**	**4**	**2**	**30**	**15.0**	**15**	0
2005	PIT	**1**	0	0	0	0	0	0	0
		2	1	4	2	30	15.0	15	0

=== College ===
Season	Team	GP	Receiving		
Season	Team	GP	Rec	Yds	TD
1999	Kansas State	11	42	1,007	9
2000	Kansas State	13	64	1,166	14
Career		24	106	2,173	23

== Personal life ==
After retiring from professional football, Morgan started a trucking company and worked with underprivileged children, assisting with training youth football players.
