= Kansas State Wildcats football =

American college football team

2026 Kansas State Wildcats football team
- First season: 1896; 130 years ago
- Athletic director: Gene Taylor
- General manager: Trey Scott
- Head coach: Collin Klein; 1st season, 4–4 (.500)
- Location: Manhattan, Kansas
- Stadium: Bill Snyder Family Football Stadium (capacity: 50,000)
- NCAA division: Division I FBS
- Conference: Big 12
- Colors: Royal purple and white
- All-time record: 592–684–41 (.465)
- Bowl record: 12–14 (.462)

Conference championships
- KIAA: 1909, 1910, 1912 Big Eight: 1934 Big 12: 2003, 2012, 2022

Division championships
- Big 12 North: 1998, 1999, 2000, 2003
- Consensus All-Americans: 15
- Rivalries: Colorado (rivalry); Iowa State (rivalry); Kansas (rivalry); Missouri (rivalry); Nebraska (rivalry)

Uniforms
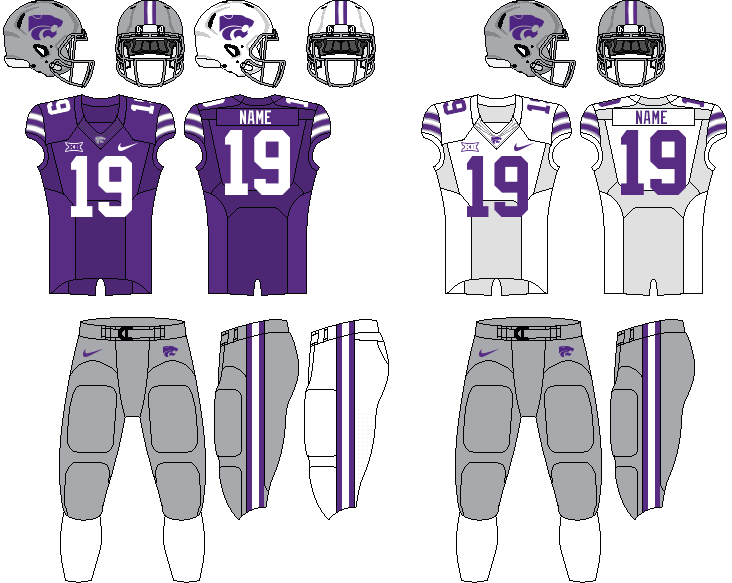
- Fight song: "Wildcat Victory"
- Mascot: Willie the Wildcat
- Marching band: The Pride Of Wildcat Land
- Outfitter: Nike
- Website: kstatesports.com

The Kansas State Wildcats football program (variously K-State or KSU) is the intercollegiate football program of the Kansas State University Wildcats. The program is classified in the NCAA Division I Football Bowl Subdivision (FBS), and the team competes in the Big 12 Conference.

Historically, the team has an all-time losing record, at 585-680–42 as of the conclusion of the 2025 season. However, the program has had some stretches of winning in its history. Most recently, in 2022, the team under head coach Chris Klieman won the Big 12 Conference and appeared in its first Sugar Bowl. Under former coach Bill Snyder, Kansas State won two conference titles, finished the 1998 regular season with an undefeated (11–0) record and No. 1 national ranking, and from 1995 to 2001 appeared in the AP Poll for 108 consecutive weeks—the 16th-longest streak in college football history.

Since 1968, the team has played in Bill Snyder Family Football Stadium (formerly KSU Stadium) in Manhattan, Kansas. The Kansas State University Marching Band, also known as the Pride of Wildcat Land, performs at all home games and bowl games.

== History ==
=== Early history (1893–1966) ===
According to most sources, Kansas State's football team began play on Thanksgiving Day 1893. A team from Kansas State defeated St. Mary's College 18–10 on that date. Other sources name Kansas State's first game as a 24–0 victory over a team from Abilene, Kansas, on November 3, 1894. However, the first official game recorded in the team's history is a 14–0 loss to Fort Riley on November 28, 1896.

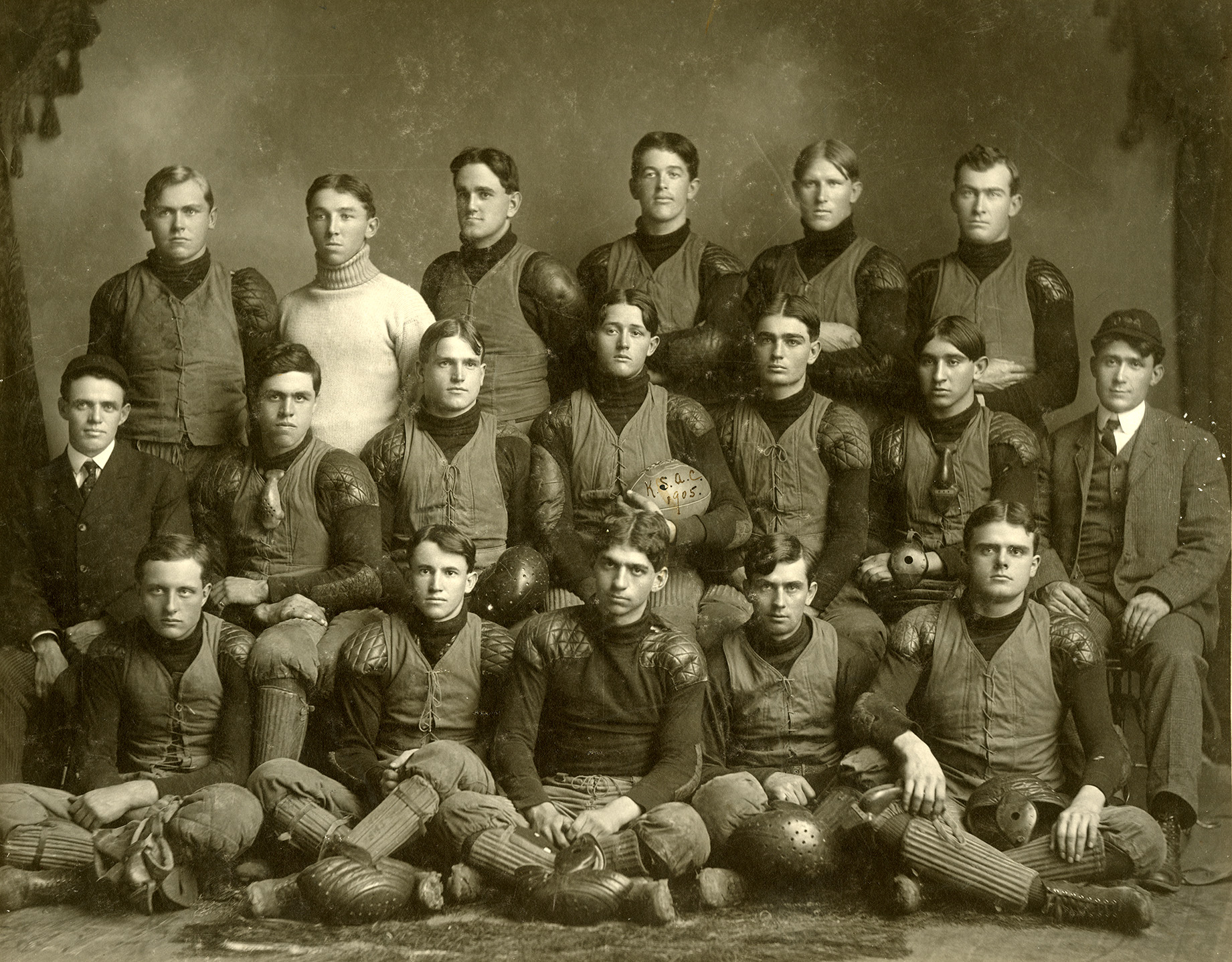
The 1905 team was the first coached by Mike Ahearn (left)

In its earliest years, the program had a different coach every year—generally, a former college football player who had just graduated from college. Often, the coaches also played with the team during the games. Some of the coaches during this era include Fay Moulton (1900), who went on to win Olympic medals as a sprinter; Wade Moore (1901), who later was a successful minor league baseball manager; and Cyrus E. Dietz (1902), who became a justice of the Illinois Supreme Court. The pattern changed when Mike Ahearn became the first long-term coach in 1905. Ahearn coached for six seasons, leading the team to winning records each year, and concluding in the 1910 season with a 10–1 mark. Ahearn also won two conference championships in the Kansas Intercollegiate Athletic Association, in 1909 and 1910. Ahearn was followed by Guy Lowman, who led Kansas State to another conference championship in 1912.

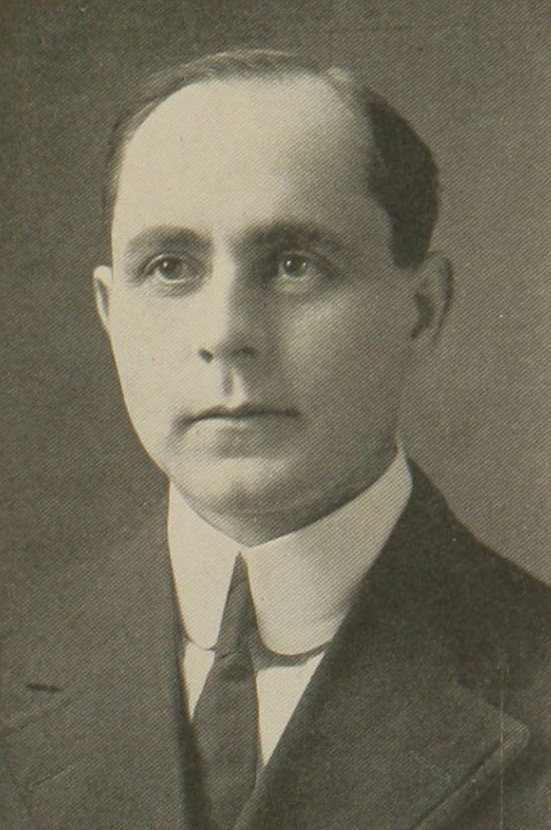
Coach Guy Lowman in 1912

Kansas State accepted an invitation into the Missouri Valley Intercollegiate Athletic Association in 1913. After a few years adjusting to the league's eligibility rules and a higher level of competition, the school experienced sustained success in the 1920s and 1930s. Elden Auker was part of a group of excellent athletes who attended Kansas State around the time of the Great Depression, which also included Ralph Graham, Maurice Elder, Leland Shaffer, Cookie Tackwell, Dougal Russell, Henry Cronkite, George Maddox, and Elmer Hackney. These athletes were coupled with a series of Hall of Fame coaches. The first of these coaches was Zora Clevenger, who arrived in 1916 when Kansas State essentially swapped head coaches with Tennessee. Clevenger is in the College Football Hall of Fame for his playing abilities, but he was also recognized as a brilliant coach and administrator. Clevenger was followed as football coach in 1920 by Charlie Bachman, who stayed until 1927 and earned his way into the College Football Hall of Fame with his coaching prowess. Bachman was also responsible for permanently endowing Kansas State's sports teams with the nickname of "Wildcats." His successor, Alvin "Bo" McMillin, the coach from 1928 to 1933, is also in the College Football Hall of Fame as a player, but he too was a successful coach who, after leaving Kansas State, was recognized as national collegiate coach of the year and then served as head coach for two NFL teams. After McMillin left, Kansas State hired Lynn "Pappy" Waldorf, who was also later enshrined in the College Football Hall of Fame as a coach.

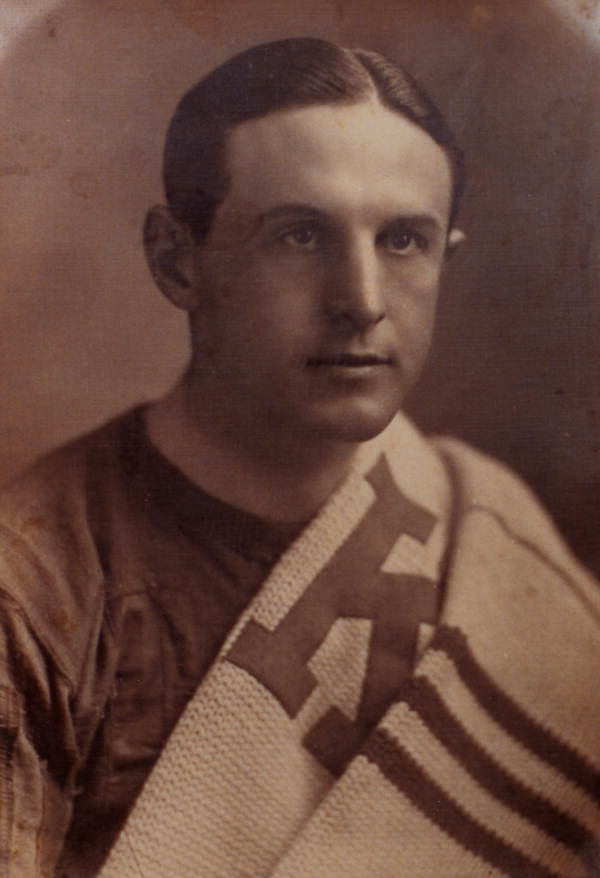
All-conference football star Tom Sebring in 1922

With this combination of coaches and players, Kansas State enjoyed what would be its last streak of sustained success on the football field for 60 years. In 1931, the football team was on track for a potential bid to the Rose Bowl, the sole bowl game in the country at the time, until Ralph Graham was injured. In 1934, Kansas State won its first major conference football championship. That same year, the New York Times referred to Kansas State as "an established Middle Western leader." But then Waldorf abruptly left for Northwestern after the season, and the winning stopped. In the midst of the period, the MVIAA split up. In 1928, six of the seven state schools in the MVIAA, including Kansas State, banded together in a conference that retained the MVIAA name. This group would evolve into the Big Eight Conference. Over the next 60 years, Kansas State would experience very little success on the football field. According to longtime Wildcat radio announcer Dev Nelson, part of the problem was that Kansas State was one of the few major schools that didn't make a significant investment in its football program after World War II. Indeed, for many years the Wildcats spent far less on football—and athletics as a whole—than any Big Eight school. For example, in 1987–1988, the University of Oklahoma (the conference's second smallest school) spent $12.5 million on athletics while Kansas State spent $5.5 million. Reflective of the mid-century futility was a 28-game losing streak from 1945 to 1948, the second-longest in NCAA FBS history. Kansas State also had losing streaks of 18 and 17 games in the 1960s. In the middle of posting a 0–10 record in the 1947 season, the Kansas State program slipped below the.500 all-time winning percentage, where it has remained since. However, there were a few shining moments during these decades. (the first televised homecoming game), losing to Nebraska 25–9.

In the mid-1950s, head coach Bill Meek started to rebuild the program he took over in 1951. In 1953, Kansas State posted a 5–3–1 record, the school's first winning season since Wes Fry's 1936 team. Upon starting that season 5–1, K-State also made the school's first appearance in the top 20 polls for college football, at No. 18 in the Coaches Poll on October 28, 1953. The following year was even better, with Kansas State posting a 7–3 record and playing for an Orange Bowl berth in their final game. But Meek left Kansas State following the 1954 season, when the school refused to give raises to his assistants. Bus Mertes got his first college head coach position as the 24th head football coach for the Kansas State Wildcats in Manhattan, Kansas, and he held that position for five seasons, from 1955 until 1959. His coaching record at Kansas State was 15 wins, 34 losses, and 1 ties. As of completion of the 2007 season, this ranks him tenth at Kansas State in terms of total wins and 19th at Kansas State in terms of winning percentage. In seven seasons at Kansas State, Coach Doug Weaver compiled an 8–60–1 record. His final two seasons went without a win. His 1961 and 1962 teams posted a losing streak of 18 games—tied for the 20th-longest streak in college football history. Weaver's best season at K-State came in 1964, when his team went 3–7, with the three wins coming by a combined six points, but he retained his sense of humor. According to a Sports Illustrated article, after he was hanged in effigy at K-State, he said: "I'm glad it happened in front of the library. I've always emphasized scholarship." He was fired following the 1966 season. His career record was 8–60–1 including a 4–43–1 record in conference play.

=== Vince Gibson era (1967–1974) ===
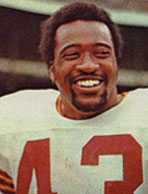
Former Wildcat Larry Brown (RB) was NFL MVP in 1972

In the late 1960s, coach Vince Gibson also briefly started to turn the program around. Behind sophomore quarterback Lynn Dickey, the 1968 squad earned the school's first ranking in the AP Poll and shut out the University of Nebraska in Lincoln for the school's first victory over NU in a decade. That same season, Kansas State also moved into newly built KSU Stadium, currently named The Bill Snyder Family Stadium. The 1969 season was even better. The team started 2–0 before second-ranked Penn State University arrived to play in Manhattan, Kansas. Penn State would ultimately finish the 1969 season undefeated, but Kansas State provided them with one of their toughest tests in a 17–14 game. Following the loss to Penn State, Kansas State reeled off three straight victories, including a win over defending conference champion Kansas in the first Governor's Cup game, and a 59–21 blowout of 11th-ranked Oklahoma, which was Kansas State's first win over OU since 1934. (It was also the largest loss in Oklahoma's history.) After the Oklahoma game, Kansas State sported a 5–1 record and a No. 12 national ranking in the AP Poll. This was the high point of the season, as the team lost its last four games to finish 5–5. Nevertheless, in only his third season, Gibson had dramatically improved the program.

Prior to the 1970 season, Gibson was named the pre-season national coach of the year by Playboy Magazine. The season that followed was up-and-down but ultimately disappointing despite a winning record and a second-place finish in the Big Eight. Kansas State won at Oklahoma and defeated eighth-ranked Colorado, but the season was soured by non-conference defeats and a blow-out loss to Nebraska in the final conference game of the year with the conference title on the line. The worst news of the season came on October 7, 1970, when the conference issued severe sanctions against Kansas State for recruiting violations. The Wildcats were placed on three years' probation, including a one-year ban from bowl games and live television. Gibson would never have another winning season, and left the school in 1974. He later said that the sanctions—the product of what he called an immature quarrel between himself and Jayhawks coach Pepper Rodgers—destroyed everything he'd built over his first four years.

=== Ellis Rainsberger era (1975–1977) ===
Wisconsin assistant coach Ellis Rainsberger returned to his alma mater to serve as head football coach from 1975 to 1977. He started his tenure there winning his first three games, but ultimately compiled a record of 6–27. Rainsberger left Kansas State with the program placed on probation for giving too many scholarships.

=== Jim Dickey era (1978–1985) ===
The Wildcats wouldn't have another winning season until 1982, when Jim Dickey led a redshirt-laden roster to the 1982 Independence Bowl—the first bowl appearance in school history. However, Dickey was unable to sustain the momentum, and suffered back-to-back three-win seasons in 1983 and 1984. After the team opened the 1985 season with two consecutive losses to I-AA teams, Dickey was forced to resign, leaving Kansas State with a record of 24–52–2.

=== Stan Parrish era (1986–1988) ===
In 1986, Marshall head coach Stan Parrish was hired as K-State's head coach. Parrish was unable to sustain any sort of success, posting yearly records of 2–9, 0–10–1, and 0–11. The Wildcats bottomed out by going on a 27-game winless streak (0–26–1) that began in October 1986. Following back-to-back winless campaigns, Parrish resigned under pressure after the 1988 season. By then, Kansas State had become the first program in Division I-A (FBS) to lose 500 games and had the worst overall record in the nation. In 93 years of play, the Wildcats had gone 299–509–41 (.370).

=== Bill Snyder era (1989–2005) ===
Things changed in 1989, when the athletic department hired Iowa's offensive coordinator, Bill Snyder, to replace Parrish as head coach. Snyder took over a program that had the worst record in NCAA Division I-A (FBS) history at the time and had gone 27 consecutive games without a win (0–26–1) dating to October 1986. From 1935 to 1988, the last year before Snyder's arrival, Kansas State had won 137 games in total. Since the 1982 Independence Bowl season, the Wildcats had won a total of seven games. Snyder then presided over one of the most successful rebuilding projects in the history of college athletics, ultimately earning enshrinement in the College Football Hall of Fame for his work at Kansas State.

Considering the dreadful state of the program he'd inherited, Snyder made the Wildcats respectable fairly quickly. In his third year, 1991, Snyder's Wildcats finished 7–4 and narrowly missed receiving the school's second bowl bid ever. The team also finished with a winning record in conference play for only the third time since winning the conference title in 1934.

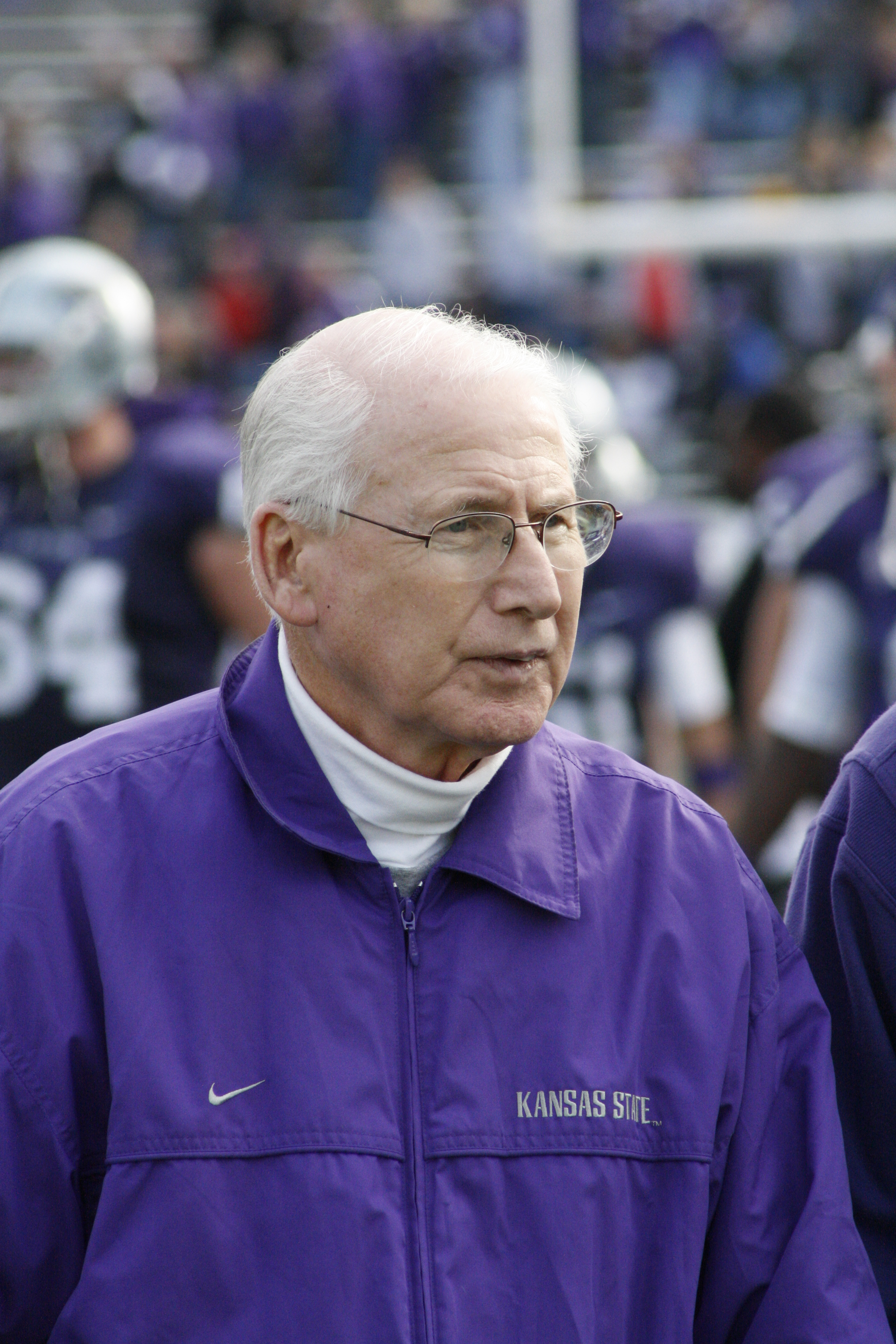
Coach Bill Snyder in 2009

In Snyder's fifth season in 1993, Kansas State played in the 1993 Copper Bowl, only its second bowl bid ever. They then pounded Wyoming 52–17 to tally the first bowl win in school history, breaking one of the longest such droughts in Division I-A at the time. Success and high rankings continued over the next decade, including six top-ten finishes in the AP Poll and four consecutive 11-win seasons from 1997 to 2000. The latter included a perfect (11–0) regular season in 1998 (before stumbling in the Big 12 Championship Game against Texas A&M). The game ended on a controversial play in double-overtime, with Sirr Parker being credited a touchdown despite video replay clearly indicating his knee down at the one yard line.

As the team improved, recruiting also improved, in large part because Snyder began tapping the rich talent base in Kansas' junior college system. Snyder was able to bring in athletes such as quarterback Michael Bishop, the runner-up for the Heisman Trophy in 1998, and running back Darren Sproles, who led the nation in rushing in 2003 and holds the Big 12 record for all-purpose yards in a career. The run of success culminated in a Big 12 Conference championship in 2003 with a 35–7 victory over the No. 1 ranked Oklahoma. (The 69 years since the last conference title in 1934 was the longest span between football titles in Division I history.) In his first 17-year stint as head coach at K-State, Snyder won 136 games—as many as his predecessors had won from 1935 to 1988—and led Kansas State to 11 consecutive bowl games (1993–2003), including six wins. Snyder's legacy at K-State during his first term also included winning or sharing four Big 12 North titles (1998, 1999, 2000, 2003) and six 11-win seasons.

In 1998, Snyder was recognized as the National Coach of the Year by the Associated Press and the Walter Camp Football Foundation, and was awarded the Bear Bryant Award and the Bobby Dodd Coach of the Year Award. Snyder was also selected Big Eight Conference coach of the Year by the Associated Press three times (1990, 1991 and 1993), joining Bob Devaney as the only two men in Big Eight history to be named Coach of the Year three times in a four-year period. Snyder was named Big 12 Conference coach of the Year twice during his first term, in 1998 (Associated Press, coaches) and 2002 (coaches). The winning attitude under Snyder was represented by a stylized wildcat, called the "Powercat" (shown in the infobox), that was added to the football team's uniforms in 1989. The emblem became so popular that by the late 1990s it had essentially replaced "Willie the Wildcat", a character designed by art department students in the late 1950s.

=== Ron Prince era (2006–2008) ===
On December 5, 2005, Ron Prince was hired as the 33rd head football coach of the Kansas State Wildcats. Prince was formerly the offensive coordinator at Virginia. In 2006, Prince's first year at the helm of the Wildcats, he led Kansas State to a 7–6 record and the team's first winning season since 2003. The signature win of the regular season was a 45–42 upset over No. 4-ranked University of Texas on November 11, 2006. Kansas State finished the season with a 37–10 loss to the Scarlet Knights of Rutgers University in the inaugural Texas Bowl on December 28, 2006.

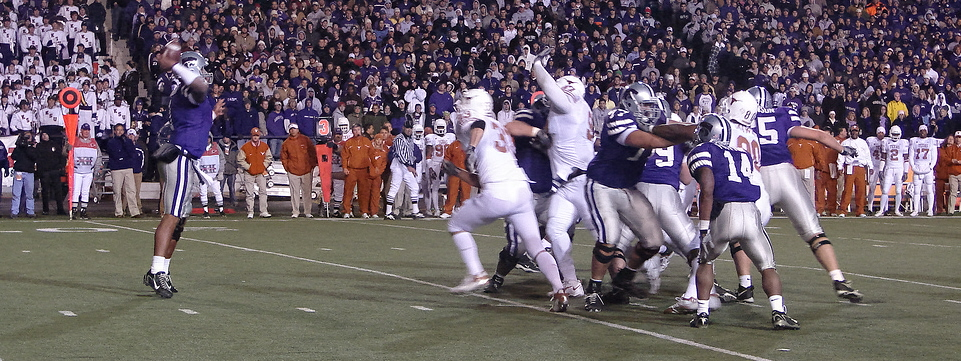
Josh Freeman uses all of his 6'6 frame to pass over the Texas line in a 45–42 victory in 2006.

In Prince's second season, the team featured standout quarterback Josh Freeman and receiver Jordy Nelson, but still slipped to a 5–7 record. Coach Prince got the 2007 team off to a quick start, with a 3–1 record and a No. 24 ranking in the AP Poll after four weeks—the first ranking for Kansas State since the 2004 season. This start included another victory against a top 10-ranked Texas team, this time by 20 points. However, in the next four games, the team alternated wins and losses and fell from the Top 25. Four straight losses followed to close out the season. The 2008 season was Ron Prince's third at Kansas State. Coach Prince led the 2008 team to another 5–7 record. With three games remaining in the season, on November 5, 2008, the school announced that Ron Prince would not return as Kansas State head coach in 2009. Ron Prince finished his career at Kansas State 0–9 against Kansas State's biggest rivals (Nebraska, Kansas, and Missouri)

=== Snyder's return (2009–2018) ===
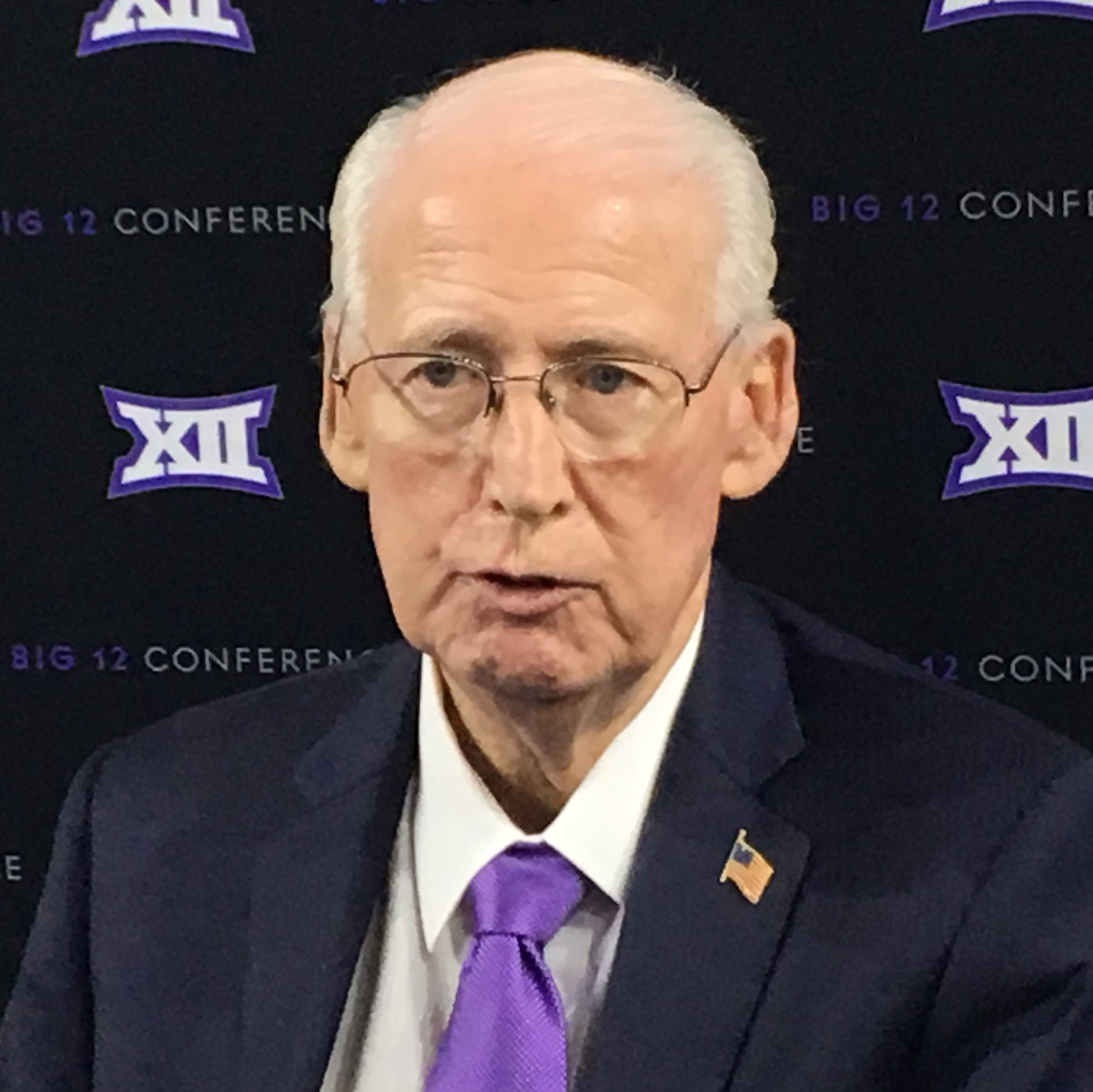
Snyder at 2017 Big 12 Media Days

On November 23, 2008, in a surprising move, Kansas State University announced that Bill Snyder was coming out of retirement and was hired to replace Ron Prince as head coach. Snyder initially received a 5-year, $1.8 million contract.

In 2009, Snyder led the team to a 6–6 record, going 4–4 in Big 12 play, and falling one game short of winning the Big 12 North. The team failed to make a bowl game for the third consecutive season. Following a loss to Nebraska Cornhuskers football at Memorial Stadium on November 21, 2009, Kansas State became the fourth FBS teams to lose 600 games, joining Northwestern, Indiana, and Wake Forest. Snyder led the 2010 team to an improved 7–6 record, with a 3–5 record in conference play, good for third in the North division. The season ended with a loss to Syracuse in the 2010 Pinstripe Bowl—K-State's first bowl appearance since Ron Prince led the school to the 2006 Texas Bowl.

In 2011, Coach Snyder led the team to a 10–3 record, a second-place finish in the Big 12 Conference, and a No. 15 ranking in the final AP Poll. The team finished the season with a loss to the No. 7 Arkansas Razorbacks in the Cotton Bowl. It was the first 10-win season and first top-20 ranking for Kansas State since the 2003 season. After the season Snyder was named the Woody Hayes Coach of the Year and the Sporting News National Coach of the Year, as well as the Big 12 Conference Coach of the Year. In 2012, Snyder's Wildcats won the school's sixth conference football championship, and first since 2003. Kansas State also earned the school's first No. 1 ranking in the BCS standings after starting the season 10–0, before falling to Baylor in its 11th game of the season. The Wildcats earned the conference's automatic berth in the 2013 Fiesta Bowl, where the team lost to the No. 5 Oregon Ducks, 35–17. After the season, Coach Snyder was named the conference coach of the year for the seventh time in his career. He also was awarded the Bobby Dodd Coach of the Year Award for the second time. He and Joe Paterno are the only two-time winners of the award.

In 2013, after completing the regular season with a 7–5 record, the Kansas State Wildcats returned for a bowl game for the fourth straight year, were selected to play in the 2013 Buffalo Wild Wings Bowl and played the Michigan Wolverines. Winning this game, Kansas State snapped a five-game bowl losing streak, beating Michigan in the Buffalo Wild Wings Bowl, 31–14. On January 31, 2013, it was announced that Snyder's contract was extended through the 2017 season. In 2014, the Wildcats were led to a 9–3 record by Snyder with losses to Auburn of the SEC, Baylor and TCU, finishing third in the Big 12. The Wildcats had been ranked in all polls with the highest ranking in the new College Football Playoff rankings at number 7. Kansas State became bowl eligible after winning its sixth game against Texas on October 25. The No. 11 Wildcats were invited to the Alamo Bowl where they fell to No. 14 UCLA in San Antonio, Texas, 40–35.

On December 2, 2018, Bill Snyder announced his second retirement from coaching college football. The turnaround of the Kansas State football program between Snyder's initial arrival in 1989 and second retirement in 2018 is widely regarded as one of the most remarkable in college football history. He retired as the twentieth-winningest head coach in college football history. Snyder finished his career with Kansas State with 215 victories and two Big 12 championships. He has accounted for over 40 percent of Kansas State's all-time wins as of the completion of the 2018 season.

=== Chris Klieman era (2019–2025) ===
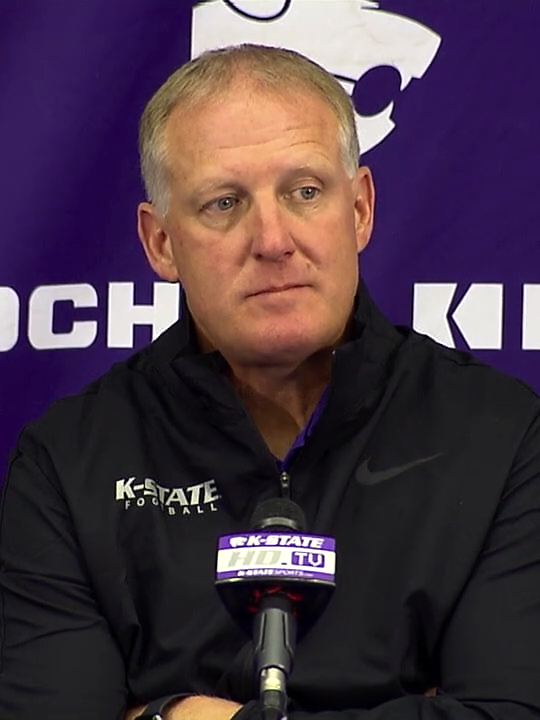
Coach Klieman

On December 10, 2018, following Bill Snyder's decision to retire again, North Dakota State head coach Chris Klieman was announced as the new Kansas State head football coach. Both schools agreed that Klieman would remain at NDSU while the Bison were participating in the FCS playoffs, then take over as Wildcats head coach once the Bisons' season ended. When he was hired by K-State, Klieman signed a six-year contract worth over $2 million annually excluding incentives.

The Wildcats exceeded expectations in Klieman's first season, finishing with an 8–5 record which included a CFP rank as high as No. 20, a win over No. 5 Oklahoma, and a Liberty Bowl berth, where they lost to Navy. During the 2020 season, Chris Klieman led Kansas State to a 4–6 season and 4–5 in the Big 12, which is good for 7th in the Big 12 standings. The 2020 season was shortened by Covid. On October 5, 2020, K-State and Chris Klieman agreed to a new contract worth $23.5 million over the course of the deal excluding incentives. In the 2021 Season, Chris Klieman and the Wildcats had a bounce back season and ended the season 8–5 overall and another 4–5 in the Big 12. Kansas State beat LSU in the Texas Bowl. In the 2022 season, Kansas State went 10–4 overall and 7–2 in the Big 12. The Wildcats beat then-undefeated TCU to win the 2022 Big 12 Championship. The team was selected for the New Year's Six Bowl; the Sugar Bowl, however, lost to a 10–2 Alabama Crimson Tide team. Chris Klieman has a 39–24 (62%) overall record and a 26–19 (57%) record in the Big 12. On May 15, 2023, Kansas State University and Chris Klieman agreed to a new eight-year contract worth $5.5 million annually excluding incentives.

Klieman led the Wildcats to a 9–4 record in 2023. They began the season on September 2 with a 45–0 shutout victory over FCS opponent Southeast Missouri State. After a 42–13 victory over Troy the following week, K-State suffered their first loss of the season in a 30–27 contest against Missouri on a 61-yard field goal as time expired. After a 44–31 win over UCF the next week, Klieman's team lost 29–21 to Oklahoma State. The Wildcats then reeled off three straight wins; 38–21 over Texas Tech, 41–3 over TCU and a 41–0 shutout over Houston. On November 3, Kansas State dropped a 33–30 heartbreaker to Texas in overtime. After a 59–25 win over Baylor and a 31–27 victory over archrival Kansas, the Wildcats closed the regular season with a 42–35 loss to rival Iowa State. Kansas State accepted a berth in the 2023 Pop-Tarts Bowl, where they defeated NC State by a score of 28–19.

To kick off the 2025 season, #17-ranked Kansas State went to Dublin, Ireland, to play the #22-ranked Iowa State in the Aer Lingus Classic. Kansas State to start the year had the best odds to win the conference, ahead of Arizona State, Texas Tech, and Iowa State. Kansas State would go on to lose 24–21 to their rivals. Kansas State would only continue to disappoint as the conference favorites, barely beating FCS North Dakota, and losing to Army and Arizona. Starting Big 12 play, Kansas State started to regain speed, winning 3 of their last 4, including beating their rivals, Kansas, 42–17. Then, Kansas State lost two of its next three games, losing to #13 Texas Tech and #12 Utah. In the Utah game, Kansas State running back Joe Jackson set the single-game rushing yard record by a Kansas State player with 293 yards, passing KSU legend Darren Sproles. He also received Big 12 offensive player of the week honors in the 51–47 loss. Kansas State ended the year beating rivals Colorado 24–14. Coach Klieman decided not to participate in a bowl game. Kansas State ended the year 6–6 and 5–4 in conference play, and Klieman ended his tenure at Kansas State 54–34, making him the second-winningest coach in Kansas State Football history, behind HOF coach Bill Snyder.

== Conference affiliations ==
- Independent (1896–1908)
- Kansas College Athletic Conference/Kansas Intercollegiate Athletic Association (1909–1912)
- Missouri Valley Intercollegiate Athletic Association (1913–1927)
- Big 6/7/8 Conference (1928–1995)
- Big 12 Conference (1996–present)

== Championships ==
=== Conference championships ===
Kansas State has won seven conference championships, six outright and one shared.

Year	Conference	Coach	Overall record	Conference record
1909	Kansas Intercollegiate Athletic Association	Mike Ahearn	7–2	n/a
1910	Kansas Intercollegiate Athletic Association	Mike Ahearn	10–1	n/a
1912	Kansas Intercollegiate Athletic Association	Guy Lowman	8–2	n/a
1934	Big 6 Conference	Pappy Waldorf	7–2–1	5–0
2003	Big 12 Conference	Bill Snyder	11–4	6–2
2012†	Big 12 Conference	Bill Snyder	11–2	8–1
2022	Big 12 Conference	Chris Klieman	10–4	7–2

† Co-champions

=== Division championships ===
Kansas State has won four division championships, all within the Big 12 North.

Year	Division	Coach	Opponent	CG result
1998	Big 12 North	Bill Snyder	Texas A&M	L 33–36^{2OT}
1999†	Big 12 North	Bill Snyder	N/A lost tiebreaker to Nebraska	
2000†	Big 12 North	Bill Snyder	Oklahoma	L 24–27
2003	Big 12 North	Bill Snyder	Oklahoma	W 35–7

† Co-champions

== Bowl games ==
Kansas State has appeared in 26 bowl games, posting an overall record of 12–14. The team's most recent appearance in a bowl game was a 44-41 win against Rutgers University at the 2024 Rate Bowl in Phoenix, Arizona

The team's first bowl game was the 1982 Independence Bowl, under coach Jim Dickey. The Wildcats lost to the Wisconsin Badgers 14–3 in that contest. The team's next bowl game came in 1993 when Kansas State began a streak of 11 straight bowl appearances under coach Bill Snyder that lasted through the 2003 season. This is the 21st-longest bowl streak in college football history.

Kansas State has been invited seven times to one of the "New Year's Six" major bowl games (the Rose, Sugar, Fiesta, Orange, Cotton, and Peach Bowls), including appearances in BCS and Bowl Alliance games.

Not included in this tally of bowl games is Kansas State's first "post-season" game, played in 1931 against Wichita State as a fundraiser during the Great Depression. Kansas State won that game 20–6. Also not included is the 1992 "Coca-Cola Bowl" played in Tokyo, Japan, against Nebraska, which was a regular season game.

Bowl game	No. of appearances	First year	Last year	Bowl record
Cactus Bowl†	5	1993	2024	4–1
Cotton Bowl	3	1996	2011	1–2
Fiesta Bowl	3	1997	2012	1–2
Holiday Bowl	3	1995	2002	3–0
Texas Bowl	3	2006	2021	2–1
Alamo Bowl	2	1998	2014	0–2
Liberty Bowl	2	2015	2019	0–2
Aloha Bowl	1	1994	1994	0–1
Independence Bowl	1	1982	1982	0–1
Pinstripe Bowl	1	2010	2010	0–1
Sugar Bowl	1	2022	2022	0–1
Pop-Tarts Bowl	1	2023	2023	1–0

† The Cactus Bowl includes in its history Kansas State appearances in the Copper Bowl (1993), the Insight.com Bowl (2001), the Buffalo WildWings Bowl (2013), the Cactus Bowl (2017), and the Rate Bowl (2024).

== Top 25 rankings ==
Kansas State University has finished in the final rankings of the AP Poll or Coaches Poll on 15 occasions throughout its history, including six top-10 finishes. The AP Poll first appeared in 1934, and has been published continuously since 1936. The Coaches Poll began in the 1950–51 season.

In addition to the major polls, the BCS produced rankings from 1998 to 2013, to help select teams for BCS Bowls. The final BCS standings were issued before bowl games. Beginning in 2014, the College Football Playoff committee began issuing rankings to determine which teams were selected for the playoffs.

Kansas State spent four weeks ranked No. 1 in mid-season Coaches Polls during the 1998 season, and one week ranked No. 1 in the mid-season BCS standings during the 2012 season, but has not finished with a No. 1 ranking in a final poll.

Season	Final Record	Major Polls		Others	
Season	Final Record	AP Poll	Coaches Poll	BCS Standings (1998–2013)	CFP Poll (2014–present)
1993	9–2–1	20	18		
1994	9–3	19	16		
1995	10–2	7	6		
1996	9–3	17	17		
1997	11–1	8	7		
1998	11–2	10	9	3	
1999	11–1	6	6	6	
2000	11–3	9	8	9	
2002	11–2	7	6	8	
2003	11–4	14	13	10	
2011	10–3	15	16	8	
2012	11–2	12	11	5	
2014	9–4	18	18		11
2022	10–4	14	14		9
2023	9–4	18	19		25

== Home fields ==
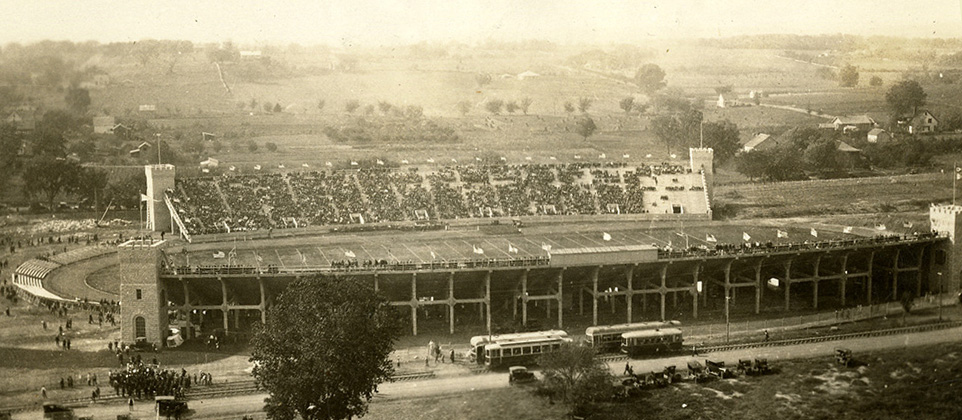
Memorial Stadium, 1924

Kansas State's first official playing field was an open public square in Manhattan located at Bluemont Avenue and 8th Street, which it began using in 1897. The square hosted Kansas State baseball games and track meets in addition to football contests. The first improvements built at this site were a wooden fence around the square and a wooden covered grandstand, erected in 1901. A new grandstand was built in 1906, along with a small locker room. Seats for football games in the new grandstand were reserved with a charge of $1.00 for the season, plus the admission fee for each game. Construction of Bluemont Elementary School on that plot of land forced Kansas State to move its athletics on campus beginning in 1911.

=== Ahearn Field ===
The on-campus football field was located at the southwest corner of the campus and was named Ahearn Field in honor of former coach Mike Ahearn, who had led the football team to a 10–1 record in its last season at the prior field. The covered wooden grandstand and locker room from the old field were moved and used at Ahearn Field.

=== Memorial Stadium ===
In 1922, Kansas State opened the first section of Memorial Stadium on the location of Ahearn Field, at a cost of $500,000 USD. The stadium's name was a tribute to Kansas State students who died in World War I. It had a seating capacity of 17,500 when completed, although attendance sometimes exceeded 20,000. By 1967, the school's allegiance outgrew the old stadium, and the team moved to KSU Stadium in 1968.

=== Bill Snyder Family Stadium ===
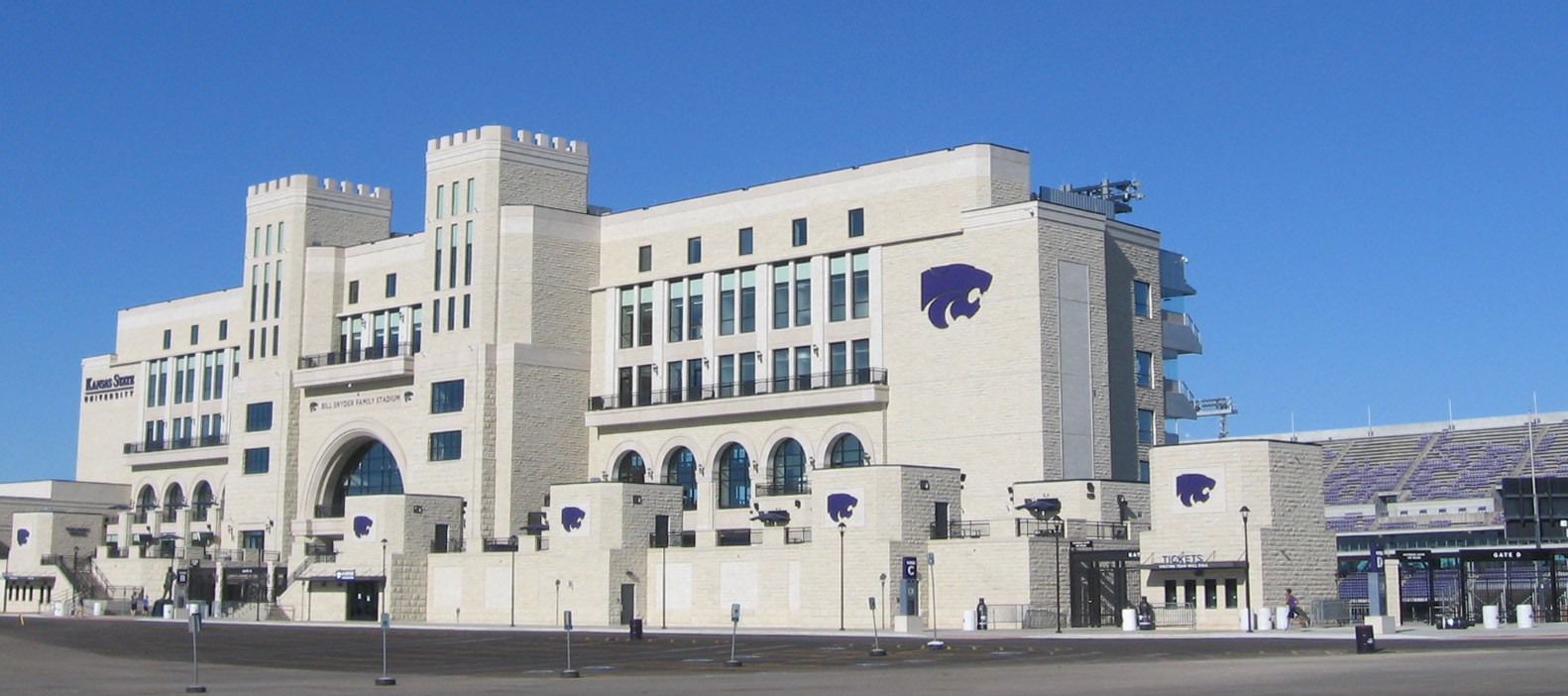
Bill Snyder Family Football Stadium, 2013

KSU Stadium opened its doors September 21, 1968, with a 21–0 victory over Colorado State. It was renamed Bill Snyder Family Football Stadium after former head coach Bill Snyder originally retired at the end of the 2005 season.

The original stadium had a seating capacity of 35,000. In the summer of 1970, an expansion added 4,000 permanent bleachers on the east side and 3,000 temporary bleachers on the west side. Following the 1998 season, the addition of an upper deck and sky suites on the east side increased the stadium’s capacity to over 50,000.

In 2013, Kansas State opened an entirely new West Side Stadium Center, including a new press box, additional luxury seats, and areas for student-athlete uses (including a dining area). The exterior of the West Side Stadium Center is faced with limestone and features two towers with decorative battlements. In August 2015, Kansas State finished a $69 million renovation to the north end zone (Vanier Football Complex). It includes a new student study area, an 1,800 square foot locker room, and a 10,000 square foot weight room as well as new coaches offices, seating, and a new team entrance area. It also features a limestone facade on its exterior similar to the rest of the K-State campus

Kansas State's final stage of the Bill Snyder Family Stadium master plan was completed prior to the 2021 football season with the addition of the Shamrock Zone on the south end of the stadium. This addition connects the stadium's south endzone luxury seating to Bramlage Coliseum; known as the Legends Club.

Kansas State’s longest home winning streak at the stadium was a 26-game run between 1996 and 2000. On November 11, 2000, a crowd of 53,811 spectators witnessed Kansas State’s 29–28 victory over Nebraska. This remains both the largest attendance in the stadium’s history and the highest recorded crowd for any collegiate sporting event in the state of Kansas.

== Rivalries ==
=== Colorado ===
Colorado leads the series 45–22–1. Both former Big 8 and Big 12 rivals Kansas State played annually against each other in all sports from 1948 to 2010.

In 2016, Colorado football announced a renewed rivalry series between Kansas State in a home-and-home series in 2027 and 2028. Following Colorado's announcement that it would rejoin the Big 12 starting in 2024, the two will likely play as regular conference opponents, earlier than the series that was previously scheduled. On November 1, 2023, the Big 12 announced the opponents for the 2024 through 2027 seasons, with Colorado and Kansas State scheduled to meet in 2024, 2025, and 2026.. Kansas State has won the games in 2024 and 2025 and plays the 2026 matchup in Boulder, CO.

=== Iowa State ===
Kansas State has played Iowa State every year since their first match-up in 1917, making it the eighth-longest active series in NCAA college football (102 straight years), and the longest never-interrupted series in college football history. The series record is the closest for Kansas State against any of its old Big Eight Conference rivals, with Iowa State holding a 55–50–4 lead following the 2025 game.

In 2009 and 2010, the two schools played neutral-site games at Arrowhead Stadium in Kansas City, Missouri, and fans and media adopted the name "Farmageddon" for the series. The name alludes to the two schools' agriculture programs. Kansas State University won the first "Farmageddon" game in Kansas City 24–23 in 2009, and won again the following year, 27–20. After 2010, the schools returned to playing on their campuses. Following the 2022 contest, K-State has won 26 of the last 33 games between the two schools.

In 2025, Kansas State played Iowa State in the Aer Lingus Classic in Dublin, Ireland. This was the first-ranked matchup in Ireland as Iowa State defeated Kansas State 24-21 to earn its third straight loss against Iowa State. The two schools have matchups scheduled for this upcoming season, but no future meetings are scheduled yet.

=== Kansas ===
Kansas State and Kansas first played in 1902 and have faced each other every season since 1911, making this the sixth-longest continuous series in NCAA college football history (108 straight years). The two rivals compete annually for the Governor's Cup trophy.

Neither school has had sustained excellence at the same time. The only time for a while that both schools met as ranked teams was in 1995, when the University of Kansas came into the game 7–0 and ranked No. 6 in the AP Poll, while Kansas State University was 5–1 and ranked No. 14. Kansas State beat KU 41–7 in that game. They had another ranked showdown in 2023, with #25 Kansas hosting #21 Kansas State in Lawrence. Kansas State won the back-and-forth game 31-27. KU leads the all-time series 64–55–5 after the 2024 season. The University of Kansas disputes the series record because it does not acknowledge its forfeit of a 1980 victory.

=== Missouri ===
Separated by 245 miles, these bordering state rivals have played 99 times dating back to their first meeting in 1909. The schools were members of the old Big Eight Conference from 1928 to 1995 and the modern Big 12 Conference from 1996 to 2011. After Missouri left the Big 12 to join the Southeastern Conference in 2012, the annual rivalry went on hiatus. However, on November 16, 2017, the teams agreed to a home-and home series in 2022 and 2023. As of January 2025, there are no future plans for the teams to meet again.

=== Nebraska ===
Kansas State and Nebraska were conference rivals for almost a century, from 1913 to 2010. With only 135 miles separating the two schools, they were the closest cross-border rivals in the Big 8 and Big 12 conferences. The two schools played for the first time in 1911, and then played every year from 1922, making it one of the longest uninterrupted series in college football, until Nebraska moved to the Big Ten Conference in 2011.

All-time, Nebraska leads the series 78–15–2. Kansas State endured a 29-game losing streak against Nebraska from 1969 until November 14, 1998, when No. 1 Kansas State defeated No. 11 Nebraska 40–30. Following that victory, the series became more competitive, with Kansas State posting a 4–8 record over the final 12 years that Nebraska competed in the Big 12.

The 1939 contest between the two teams was televised in Manhattan, becoming only the second televised college football game. The 1992 contest was played in Tokyo, Japan, as the Coca-Cola Classic.

== Pageantry and traditions ==
The 2006 KSU Marching Band marching to "Wildcat Victory"

=== Royal Purple ===
The official color of the university is Royal Purple, which is highlighted in the official fight song, "Wildcat Victory." Kansas State is one of a handful of colleges and universities to have just one official school color. The athletic department commonly uses white or silver as a complementary color.

=== Uniforms ===
The dominant color in Kansas State's football uniforms is Royal Purple. The team's home jersey is purple with white lettering, two white stripes around the sleeves, TV numbers on the shoulders, and a white Powercat logo under the collar. K-State's away jersey is white with purple lettering, two purple stripes around the sleeves, TV numbers on the shoulders and a purple Powercat under the collar. Both home and away pants are silver with a white stripe and purple trim down the sides, with a purple Powercat on the front left side of the pants. The team has worn these uniforms from 1989 to 2007, and from 2010 to present.

The uniforms underwent minor changes in 2008 and 2009. In 2008, the Wildcats introduced purple pants for road games, debuting them in the season’s first away game at Louisville. The team wore purple pants in every road game that year until the final road contest at Missouri, when they switched to gray pants. On November 15, 2008, Kansas State wore an all-purple uniform—purple pants with purple jerseys—at home against Nebraska, marking the first time the team had worn all-purple since 1988. For the Nebraska game, the Wildcats warmed up in their traditional purple jerseys with gray pants but emerged onto the field wearing the new purple pants.

Kansas State has had the same design on its football helmets since 1989: silver with a dark purple Powercat logo on both sides, and a white stripe and purple trim from the front to the rear of the helmet. On each side of the helmet's stripe is the individual player's number. The word "Wildcats" is also written on the back of the helmet at the very bottom. But on Fort Riley Day 2013 there was purple digital camouflage on the helmets.

=== Mascot ===
Willie the Wildcat entertains a young fan

The official mascot for the Kansas State Wildcats is Willie the Wildcat. Willie appears at every football game, home and away, as well as every home men's and women's basketball games, volleyball games, and select baseball games. Willie does one push-up for each point the football team scores, which is followed by a "K!-S!-U! Wildcats!" cheer.

=== Special event games ===
Since 1915, Kansas State has hosted an annual Homecoming event for its alumni in conjunction with a home football game. More recently, other events have also developed into traditions.

Once per year the school hosts "Fort Riley Day", when U.S. Army soldiers from nearby Fort Riley are given tickets to the game. During the game, the soldiers receive special recognition. Since 2008, the school's mascot, Willie the Wildcat, has donned digital US Army fatigues in place of his usual football uniform for this game. The Fort Riley game often has high attendance numbers.

During KSU's annual "Harley Day", Willie wears a leather vest or jacket with leather chaps on top of his usual football uniform and rides into Bill Snyder Family Stadium on a Harley-Davidson motorcycle, followed by around 50 other K-State fans on motorcycles.

Kansas State also hosts an annual "Band Day" for area high school marching bands.

=== Slogans and nicknames ===
A number of slogans and nicknames are associated with Kansas State, including:

- "EMAW" is an acronym for "Every Man a Wildcat." The full phrase dates back several decades to a time when it adorned the press box at Ahearn Fieldhouse. The acronym has been in use since the 1990s, and it is said to symbolize that one is a part of the "Wildcat nation."
- Coach Bill Snyder has established "16 Goals For Success" as a guide for the KSU football team.
- "Family" is the most recent slogan associated with the KSU football team. The slogan was popularized by Bill Snyder, and has appeared on the team's football helmet and on parts of the team's uniform.
- The "Lynch Mob" is a nickname for the Kansas State defensive team, dating back to the 1990s. The term has historical resonance because Manhattan was well known for lynching horse thieves as a means of frontier justice during the town's brief Wild West era in the 1860s.

=== Good for a "first down" ===
In 1992, K-State installed a new press box and, with the support of two Ahearn Fund donors, Randy Shoemaker and John Badke, began a tradition that would become a hallmark of Wildcat games. After the public address announcer would announce the number of yards gained on a play, Shoemaker and Badke would yell and gesture, “Good for a Wildcat first down!” The announcer soon adopted the call, helping establish it as a K-State tradition. Now, following a Wildcat first down, the announcer says, “Good for a Wildcat first down,” and with the addition of the accompanying arm motions for first downs and touchdowns, the fans often complete the phrase themselves, making it a fully interactive tradition.

=== Player honors ===
Former KSU quarterbacks Lynn Dickey and Steve Grogan had their jersey number 11 retired by the university to jointly honor both players. It is the only number retired by the football program.

In 2002, the athletic department inducted the first class into its Ring of Honor. The honored players' names and jersey numbers are on the facade of the east side of the stadium. The first class consisted of Dickey, Grogan, Sean Snyder, Jaime Mendez, Gary Spani, and Veryl Switzer.

In 2008, a second class was inducted into the Ring of Honor, consisting of Terence Newman, Martín Gramática, David Allen, and Mark Simoneau.

In 2015, a third class was inducted, consisting of Michael Bishop, Jordy Nelson, Clarence Scott, and Darren Sproles.

In 2022, a fourth class was inducted, consisting of Larry Brown, Ell Roberson, Darren Howard, Tyler Lockett, Arthur Brown, and Collin Klein.

=== Televised games ===
Kansas State's football team has played in some pioneering televised games, including:

- On October 28, 1939, Kansas State's Homecoming game against Nebraska was the second televised college football game ever.
- On December 11, 1982, the Independence Bowl, featuring Kansas State against Wisconsin, was the first college football game televised live on ESPN.
- On August 30, 2013, Kansas State's home game against North Dakota State was the second college football game televised live on Fox Sports 1.

== Individual awards and honors ==
=== National ===
The following Kansas State players and coaches are in the College Football Hall of Fame (with induction year):

- Darren Sproles (2021)
- Charlie Bachman (1978)
- Mark Simoneau (2012)
- Bill Snyder (2015)
- Gary Spani (2002)
- Lynn "Pappy" Waldorf (1966)
- Michael Bishop (2023)
- Terence Newman (2026)

Kansas State players and coaches have won the following national awards:

Player honors

- Davey O'Brien Award
  Best quarterback

Michael Bishop – 1998

- Johnny Unitas Golden Arm Award
  Outstanding upperclass quarterback

Collin Klein – 2012

- Kellen Moore Award
  Top quarterback

Collin Klein – 2012

- Jim Thorpe Award
  Top defensive back

Terence Newman – 2002

- Jack Tatum Trophy
  Top defensive back

Chris Canty – 1996

- Lou Groza Award
  Outstanding kicker

Martín Gramática – 1997

- Jet Award
  Top Return Specialist

Tyler Lockett – 2014

Coaching honors

- AP College Football Coach of the Year Award
  Coach of the year

Bill Snyder – 1998

- Sporting News National Coach of the Year
  Coach of the year

Bill Snyder – 2011

- Bobby Dodd Award
  Coach of the year

Bill Snyder – 1998, 2012

- Paul "Bear" Bryant Award
  Coach of the year

Bill Snyder – 1998

- Walter Camp Coach of the Year
  Coach of the year

Bill Snyder – 1998

- Woody Hayes Coach of the Year
  Coach of the year

Bill Snyder – 2011

==== Heisman candidates ====
Since 1936, the Heisman Trophy has been awarded to the most outstanding player in college football in the United States. Four Kansas State players have finished in the top 10 of the balloting.

Year	Name	Position	Rank	Points
1970	Lynn Dickey	QB	10th	49
1998	Michael Bishop	QB	2nd	792
2003	Darren Sproles	RB	5th	134
2012	Collin Klein	QB	3rd	894

=== Conference ===
The Big Eight Conference established a Conference Player of the Year award in 1967 and began giving separate offensive and defensive awards in 1971. The Conference Coach of the Year award was established in 1948. These awards continued into the Big 12 Conference era. The Big 12 also began awarding a Special Teams Player of the Year in 2005.

- Offensive Player of the Year

Collin Klein, QB – 2012

- Defensive Player of the Year

Tim Colston, DL – 1995
Mark Simoneau, LB – 1999
Terence Newman, DB – 2002
Arthur Brown, LB – 2012
Jordan Willis, DE – 2016
Felix Anudike-Uzomah - 2022

- Special Teams Player of the Year

Brandon Banks, PR/KR – 2009
Tyler Lockett, KR – 2013, 2014
Morgan Burns, PR/KR – 2015

- Offensive Newcomer of the Year

Michael Bishop, QB – 1997
Deon Murphy, WR – 2007
Brandon Banks, WR – 2008
Daniel Thomas, RB – 2008

- Defensive Newcomer of the Year

Sean Snyder, P – 1991
Jeff Kelly, LB – 1997
Mario Fatafehi, DL – 1999
Derrick Yates, DB – 2000
Tank Reese, DL – 2001
Gary Chandler, DB – 2007
Arthur Brown, LB – 2011
D. J. Reed, DB – 2016

- Offensive Freshman of the Year

Tyler Lockett, WR/KR – 2011

- Defensive Freshman of the Year

Chris Canty, DB – 1994
Travis Ochs, LB – 1995
Mark Simoneau, LB – 1996
Terry Pierce, LB – 2000
Reggie Walker, DE – 2016

- Offensive Lineman of the Year

B. J. Finney, C – 2014
Cooper Beebe, G -2022

- Defensive Lineman of the Year

Meshak Williams, DE – 2012
Ryan Mueller, DE – 2013
Jordan Willis, DE – 2016
Felix Anudike-Uzomah, DE - 2022

- Coach of the Year

Vince Gibson – 1970
Jim Dickey – 1982
Bill Snyder – 1990, 1991, 1993, 1998, 2002, 2011, 2012

- Big 12 Athlete of the Year (all sports)

Collin Klein, QB – 2013
Tyler Lockett, WR – 2015

=== All-Americans ===
Since 1922, Kansas State has produced 35 players who have collected a total of 41 first-team All-American awards, including multiple-year winners.

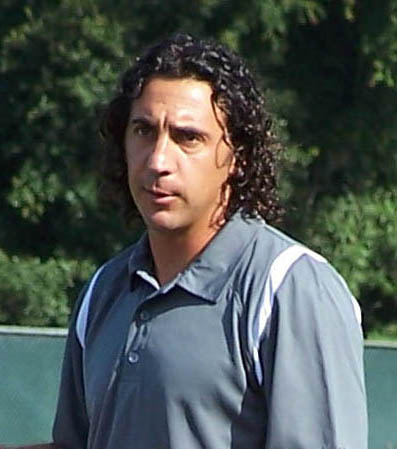
Martín Gramática, All-American kicker in 1997

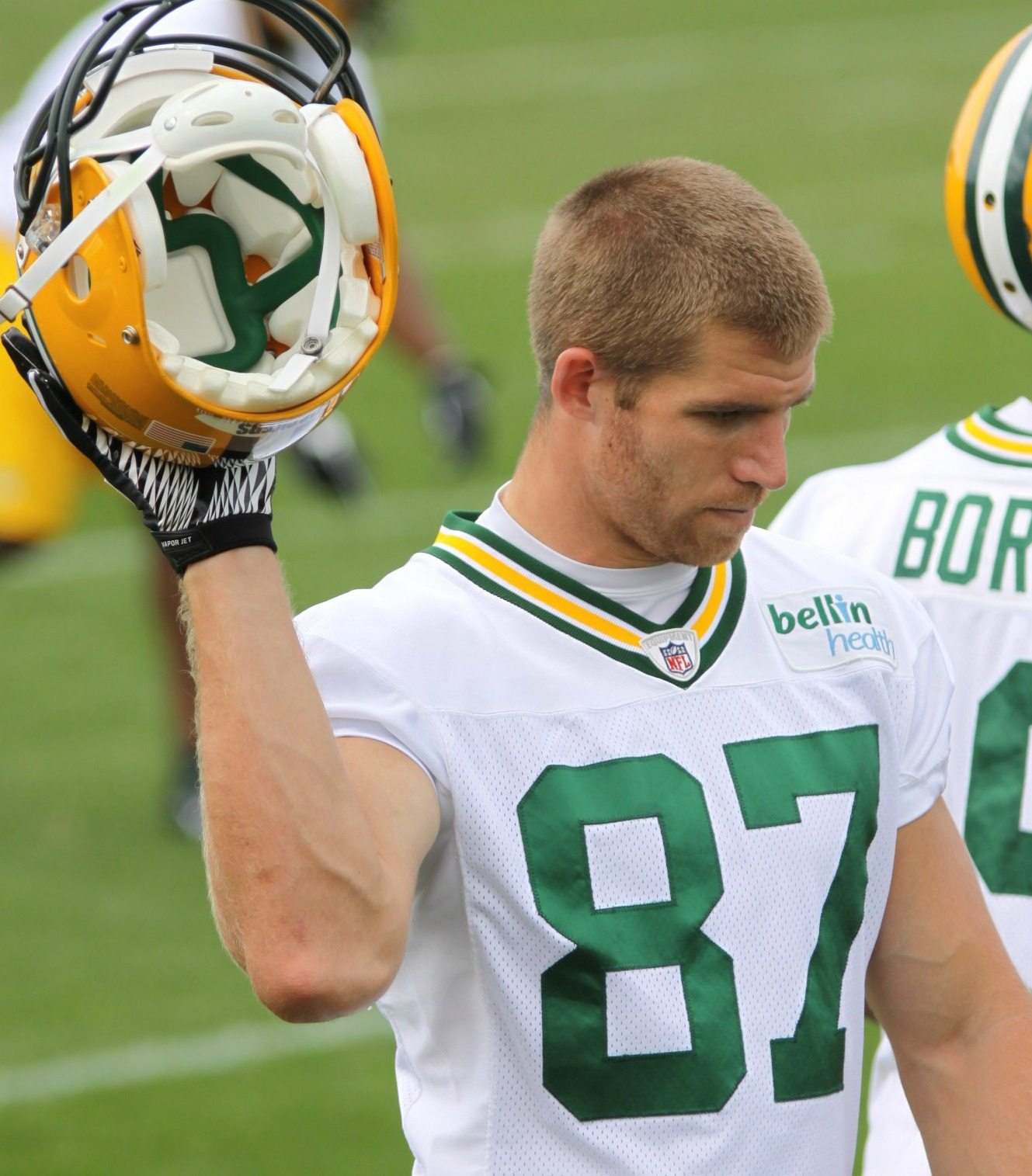
Jordy Nelson (WR) was a consensus All-American for KSU in 2007

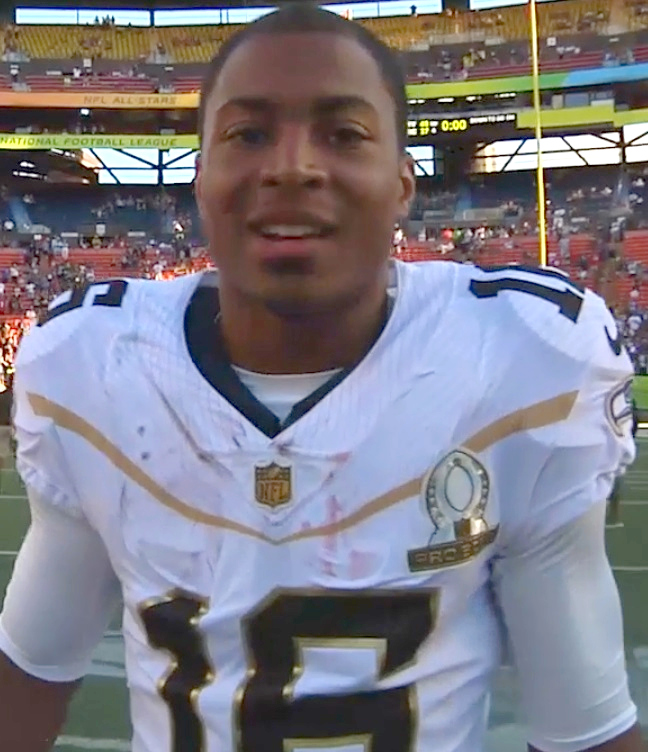
All-Pro NFL WR Tyler Lockett was a 2× All-American (2011, 2014) during his college career at Kansas State

Year	Player	Position	Consensus	Unanimous
1922	Ray D. Hahn	G		
1931	Henry Cronkite	End		
1934	George Maddox	T		
1953	Veryl Switzer	Back		
1970	Clarence Scott	CB		
1976	Gary Spani	LB		
1977	Gary Spani	LB	✓	
1992	Sean Snyder	P	✓	
1993	Jaime Mendez	S	✓	
1993	Thomas Randolph	CB		
1994	Chad May	QB		
1995	Chris Canty	CB	✓	
1995	Tim Colston	DT		
1996	Chris Canty	CB	✓	✓
1997	Martin Gramatica	K	✓	
1998	David Allen	RS	✓	
1998	Michael Bishop	QB	✓	
1998	Martín Gramática	K		
1998	Jeff Kelly	LB		
1999	Mark Simoneau	LB	✓	
1999	David Allen	RS		
2000	Mario Fatafehi	DT		
2000	Quincy Morgan	WR		
2000	Jamie Rheem	K		
2002	Terence Newman	CB	✓	✓
2002	Nick Leckey	OL		
2003	Darren Sproles	RB		
2003	Nick Leckey	OL		
2003	Josh Buhl	LB		
2007	Jordy Nelson	WR	✓	
2010	Corey Adams	LS		
2010	William Powell	RS		
2011	Tyler Lockett	RS		
2012	Arthur Brown	LB		
2014	Tyler Lockett	RS	✓	
2015	Morgan Burns	RS		
2021	Deuce Vaughn	RB	✓	
2022	Deuce Vaughn	RB	✓	
2022	Felix Anudike-Uzomah	DE		
2022	Cooper Beebe	OL		
2023	Cooper Beebe	OL	✓	✓

A number of other Kansas State players have received other All-American recognition or notable awards, including the following (second- and third-team All-Americans in italics):
Felix Anudike-Uzomah, Brandon Banks, Jonathan Beasley, Monty Beisel, Barrett Brooks, Cooper Beebe, Larry Brown, Jerametrius Butler, Rock Cartwright, Lamar Chapman, Andre Coleman, Jarrod Cooper, Lynn Dickey, Zac Diles, Maurice Elder, Josh Freeman, Yamon Figurs, Percell Gaskins, Steve Grogan, Mack Herron, Darren Howard, Collin Klein, Ben Leber, Ryan Lilja, Aaron Lockett, Kevin Lockett, Matthew McCrane, Jon McGraw, Damion McIntosh, Shad Meier, Ryan Mueller, Frank Murphy, Terry Pierce, Ell Roberson, Josh Scobey, Daniel Thomas, Todd Weiner, Rashad Washington, Jordan Willis, Ryan Young, Ty Zimmerman

=== Retired numbers ===
Kansas State retired the 11 jersey, which honors both Lynn Dickey and Steve Grogan.

Kansas State Wildcats retired numbers
No.	Player	Pos.	Tenure	Ref.
11	Lynn Dickey	QB	1968–1970	
11	Steve Grogan	QB	1972–1974	

== Individual accomplishments ==
=== Former Kansas State football players in the NFL ===
As of September 8, 2025, there are 15 former Kansas State players on NFL rosters.

Player	Current Team	Position	Roster Status
Cooper Beebe	Dallas Cowboys	C	Active
JuJu Brents	Miami Dolphins	CB	Active
DJ Giddens	Indianapolis Colts	RB	Active
Felix Anudike-Uzomah	Kansas City Chiefs	DE	Injured Reserve
Josh Hayes	Tampa Bay Buccaneers	CB	Active
KT Leveston	Cleveland Browns	OT	Active
Tyler Lockett	Las Vegas Raiders	WR	Active
Cornelius Lucas	Cleveland Browns	OT	Active
Jacob Parrish	Tampa Bay Buccaneers	CB	Active
D. J. Reed	Detroit Lions	CB	Active
Dalton Risner	Cincinnati Bengals	OG	Active
Marques Sigle	San Francisco 49ers	S	Active
Ben Sinnott	Washington Commanders	TE	Active
Skylar Thompson	Pittsburgh Steelers	QB	Active

== Records against Big 12 Conference teams ==
- All-time records, regardless of conference; through 12/18/2025

Team	Wins	Losses	Ties	Win %	Streak	Last 10
Arizona Wildcats	2	6	1	.278	L 1	2–6–1
Arizona State Sun Devils	1	6	0	.143	L 1	1–6
Baylor Bears	11	11	0	.500	L 1	4–6
BYU Cougars	4	5	0	.444	L 3	4–5
Cincinnati Bearcats	3	4	0	.429	W 3	3–4
Colorado Buffaloes	22	45	1	.331	W 2	6–4
Houston Cougars	1	1	0	.500	L 1	1–1
Iowa State Cyclones	50	55	4	.477	L 3	4–6
Kansas Jayhawks	55	64	5	.444	W 18	10–0
Oklahoma State Cowboys	29	43	0	.403	W 2	5–5
TCU Horned Frogs	11	8	0	.579	W 3	7–3
Texas Tech Red Raiders	15	10	0	.600	L 1	8–2
UCF Knights	3	0	0	1.000	W 3	3–0
Utah Utes	0	1	0	.000	L 1	0–1
West Virginia Mountaineers	8	6	0	.571	W 3	5–5
Total	214	265	11	.448	–	63–54–1

== Records against other most-played Division I FBS teams ==
- All-time records, regardless of conference; as of 12/18/2025

Former Big 12 Teams
Team	Wins	Losses	Ties	Win %	Streak
Missouri Tigers	33	61	5	.359	L 1
Nebraska Cornhuskers	15	78	2	.168	L 6
Oklahoma Sooners	22	77	4	.233	W 1
Texas Longhorns	10	14	0	.417	L 7
Texas A&M Aggies	8	8	0	.500	W 4

Others (Minimum 5 games)
Team	Wins	Losses	Ties	Win %	Streak
Arkansas Razorbacks	3	3	0	.500	L 3
Colorado State Rams	5	1	0	.833	W 4
Indiana Hoosiers	2	3	0	.400	L 2
Iowa Hawkeyes	1	5	0	.167	W 1
Louisiana Ragin' Cajuns	4	1	0	.800	W 1
Michigan State Spartans	0	5	1	.083	L 5
Missouri State Bears	8	0	0	1.000	W 8
New Mexico Lobos	1	4	0	.200	W 1
North Texas Mean Green	6	1	0	.857	W 6
Northern Illinois Huskies	4	2	0	.667	W 4
Tulsa Golden Hurricane	6	11	1	.361	L 6
Utah State Aggies	2	3	0	.400	W 1
Washington Huskies	1	4	0	.200	W 1
Wyoming Cowboys	4	4	0	.500	W 3

== Future non-conference opponents ==
Announced non-conference schedules as of August 4, 2026.

2026	2027	2028	2029	2030	2031	2032
Nicholls	South Dakota	Texas State	at Washington State	Oregon State	at Oregon State	NC State
Washington State	Georgia Southern	NC State	Sam Houston			
Tulane	at NC State					
