= Trinity Academy (Kansas) =

Coordinates: 37.7218°N 97.1947°W

Wichita Trinity Academy

Location
- 12345 E. 21st Street; Wichita Trinity Academy; Wichita, Kansas 67206; United States

Information
- Type: Private Christian school
- Motto: Truth; Faith; Character
- Established: 1994
- CEEB code: 173182
- NCES School ID: A9501854
- Grades: K–12
- Gender: Coeducational
- Student to teacher ratio: 13:1
- Language: English
- Campus size: 75 acres (30 ha)
- Campus type: Suburban
- Colors: Navy and green
- Mascot: Knight
- Accreditations: Association of Christian Schools International
- Tuition: $9,000–$13,300
- Website: www.trinityacademy.org

Wichita Trinity Academy is a private Christian K–12 school in northeast Wichita, Kansas.

== History ==
In the fall of 1994, Wichita Trinity Academy was established by three businesspersons: Bill Nath, Pete Ochs, and Bob Smith. In the spring preceding the school's opening, 20 acres (8.1 ha) of land had been donated to the cause and staff had been hired. Classes were initially held in the Central Community Church since the school could not afford to build a permanent school building. In its first year, Trinity Academy taught 61 students.

As the size of the Trinity Academy student body grew, administrators sold the original 20 acre plot and moved to a 75 acre (30 ha) plot in east Wichita. In 1998, the school opened a permanent $2.5 million building, financed through donations. By 2006, the school had grown to 266 students, making it the state's largest non-Catholic Christian high school. Another building campaign was held, with the intentions of expanding the school to accommodate a larger class size. The campaign raised $5 million, and in 2008, the expansion was complete, adding more classrooms, an auditorium, and a second gymnasium. The school continued to grow beyond 300 students. In 2013–2014, the school celebrated its 20th anniversary by unveiling a new $3.5 million football stadium and track. A cross-country track was added in 2014.

In 2016, an elementary and middle school. was added. The school opened at Eastminster Presbyterian, a nearby church. A new K–8 building was opened in January 2017, located south of the high school. Phase I of the new $5 million elementary and middle school includes 13 classrooms, a commons, a music room, a science room, a library, a kitchen, and several offices.
Notable alumni include Ben Adler, former Kansas State football player, Morgan Burns, a former-athlete-turned-minister, Maycee Bell, a professional women’s soccer player, and Felix Johnson, a comedian and sports talk radio host.

== Athletics ==
Trinity Academy is a member of the Kansas State High School Activities Association and the Central Plains League.

=== State championships ===
State Championships
Season	Sport	Number of Championships	Year
Fall	Soccer, Boys	1	2024
Fall	Total	1	

== Policies ==
According to the Trinity Academy Statement of Faith, the school believes the following:
"Doctrines open to more than one interpretation by sincere, obedient, and loving Christians are not emphasized so that unity and peace in the fellowship of God’s people will not be disrupted. It is not the intention of the Board to cause division within the body of Christ by insisting that a student adheres to a particular interpretation of doctrines on which Christians may differ. When confronted with such subordinate doctrinal issues, students are encouraged to seek further counsel from their parents or pastor."

The school prohibits its students from engaging in sexual activity.

In 2016, the school sent contracts to the student body, stating that students may be expelled if they or their family members were revealed to be homosexual/LGBT and/or promoting homosexuality/LGBT. Tom Witt of Equality Kansas criticized the policy, saying that it punishes third parties for the actions of others. The school also received criticism on social media. In response to this, the administration said that it would not "necessarily deny admission to a student with same-sex attraction" and that it would not and has not rejected a student for having a sibling who identifies as LGBT. The school stated that they follow a Biblical worldview, and that it is the decision of the student and their family to attend the school based on these values.
