= Clint Nageotte =

American baseball player (born 1980)

- Pitcher
- Born: October 25, 1980 (age 46); Parma, Ohio, U.S.
- Batted: Right Threw: Right

MLB debut
- June 6, 2004, for the Seattle Mariners

Last MLB appearance
- April 23, 2006, for the Seattle Mariners

MLB statistics
- Win–loss record: 1–6
- Earned run average: 7.78
- Strikeouts: 26
- Stats at Baseball Reference

Teams
- Seattle Mariners (2004–2006)

Clinton Scott Nageotte (/nəˈʒɒt/ nə-ZHOT; born October 25, 1980) is an American former right-handed pitcher for the Seattle Mariners of Major League Baseball (MLB).

The Mariners drafted Nageotte in the fifth round with the 155th overall selection of the 1999 Major League Baseball draft out of Brooklyn High School in Brooklyn, Ohio. He increased his fastball velocity by 4 miles per hour in his final year of high school. He led Minor League Baseball in 2002 with 214 strikeouts for the San Bernardino Stampede. He was also the league leader in strikeouts in the Midwest League in 2001 and the Texas League in 2003. Baseball America ranked him as a Top 100 prospect for four years, from 2002 to 2005. He played in the All-Star Futures Game in 2003.

Nageotte played parts of three seasons for the Mariners, from 2004 through 2006. He debuted in June 2004 and won his first MLB start, his only win in the majors. His first season ended due to back spasms in late August. He only pitched in four MLB games over the next two seasons, all short relief outings. He was ejected after throwing one pitch in his outing on August 21, as he threw a pitch over the head of Lew Ford, who had homered earlier in the game.

Nageotte became a free agent after the 2006 season and signed with the New York Mets, playing one more season in the minors. He played in independent baseball for the Long Island Ducks of the Atlantic League in 2008, the Somerset Patriots of the Atlantic League in 2009, and the Edmonton Capitals of the Golden Baseball League in 2010.

After his playing career, Nageotte became a pitching instructor at a training facility in Brecksville, Ohio.
