= Kansas State–Missouri football rivalry =

American football rivalry

- Kansas State Wildcats Missouri Tigers
- First meeting: October 9, 1909; Missouri, 3–0
- Latest meeting: September 16, 2023; Missouri, 30–27
- Next meeting: TBD
- Trophy: None

Statistics
- Total meetings: 99
- All-time series: Missouri leads, 61–33–5
- Largest victory: Kansas State, 66–0 (1999)
- Longest win streak: Kansas State, 13 (1993–2005)
- Current win streak: Missouri, 1 (2023–present)

Locations of Kansas State and Missouri

The Kansas State–Missouri football rivalry is an American college football rivalry between the Kansas State Wildcats and Missouri Tigers.

== History ==
Separated by 245 miles, these bordering state rivals have played 99 times dating back to their first meeting in 1909. The schools were members of the old Big Eight Conference from 1928 to 1995 and the modern Big 12 Conference from 1996 to 2011. After Missouri left the Big 12 to join the Southeastern Conference in 2012, the annual rivalry went on hiatus. However, on November 16, 2017, the teams agreed to a home-and home series in 2022 and 2023. As of January 2025, there are no future plans for the teams to meet again.

== Game results ==
Kansas State victories	Missouri victories	Tie games

No.	Date	Location	Winner	Score
1	October 9, 1909	Columbia, MO	Missouri	3–0
2	October 31, 1914	Columbia, MO	Missouri	13–3
3	October 30, 1915	Columbia, MO	Tie	0–0
4	November 11, 1916	Manhattan, KS	Kansas State	7–6
5	October 13, 1917	Columbia, MO	Kansas State	7–6
6	October 11, 1919	Manhattan, KS	Tie	6–6
7		Columbia, MO	Missouri	10–7
8	October 22, 1921	Manhattan, KS	Kansas State	7–5
9	November 4, 1922	Columbia, MO	Kansas State	13–10
10	November 3, 1923	Manhattan, KS	Missouri	4–2
11	October 25, 1924	Columbia, MO	Missouri	14–7
12	October 24, 1925	Manhattan, KS	Missouri	3–0
13	October 1, 1927	Columbia, MO	Missouri	13–6
14	November 10, 1928	Manhattan, KS	Missouri	19–6
15	November 2, 1929	Columbia, MO	Kansas State	7–6
16	November 1, 1930	Manhattan, KS	Kansas State	20–13
17	October 10, 1931	Columbia, MO	Kansas State	20–7
18	October 15, 1932	Manhattan, KS	Kansas State	25–0
19	October 14, 1933	Columbia, MO	Kansas State	33–0
20	November 10, 1934	Manhattan, KS	Kansas State	29–0
21	November 23, 1935	Columbia, MO	Tie	7–7
22	October 10, 1936	Manhattan, KS	Tie	7–7
23	October 9, 1937	Columbia, MO	Missouri	14–7
24	October 8, 1938	Manhattan, KS	Kansas State	21–13
25	October 21, 1939	Columbia, MO	Missouri	9–7
26	October 12, 1940	Manhattan, KS	Missouri	24–13
27	October 11, 1941	Columbia, MO	Missouri	35–0
28	October 17, 1942	Manhattan, KS	Missouri	46–2
29	October 9, 1943	Columbia, MO	Missouri	47–14
30	October 7, 1944	Manhattan, KS	Missouri	33–0
31	October 20, 1945	Columbia, MO	Missouri	41–7
32	October 12, 1946	Manhattan, KS	Missouri	26–0
33	October 18, 1947	Columbia, MO	Missouri	47–7
34	October 30, 1948	Manhattan, KS	No. 8 Missouri	49–7
35	November 24, 1949	Columbia, MO	Missouri	34–27
36	October 14, 1950	Manhattan, KS	Missouri	28–7
37	November 17, 1951	Columbia, MO	Missouri	1–0
38	October 4, 1952	Manhattan, KS	Missouri	26–0
39	November 14, 1953	Columbia, MO	Missouri	16–6
40	October 2, 1954	Manhattan, KS	Missouri	35–7
41	November 12, 1955	Columbia, MO	Kansas State	21–0
42	October 20, 1956	Manhattan, KS	Missouri	20–6
43	November 16, 1957	Columbia, MO	Kansas State	23–21
44	October 18, 1958	Manhattan, KS	Missouri	32–8
45	November 14, 1959	Columbia, MO	Missouri	26–0
46	October 15, 1960	Manhattan, KS	No. 6 Missouri	45–0
47	November 18, 1961	Columbia, MO	Missouri	27–9
48	October 13, 1962	Manhattan, KS	Missouri	32–0
49	October 12, 1963	Columbia, MO	Missouri	21–11
50	October 10, 1964	Manhattan, KS	Missouri	7–0

No.	Date	Location	Winner	Score
51	October 9, 1965	Columbia, MO	Missouri	28–6
52	October 8, 1966	Manhattan, KS	Missouri	27–0
53	November 11, 1967	Columbia, MO	Missouri	28–6
54	October 26, 1968	Manhattan, KS	No. 14 Missouri	56–20
55	November 1, 1969	Columbia, MO	No. 14 Missouri	41–38
56	October 31, 1970	Manhattan, KS	Kansas State	17–13
57	October 30, 1971	Columbia, MO	Kansas State	28–12
58	November 4, 1972	Manhattan, KS	No. 16 Missouri	31–14
59	November 3, 1973	Columbia, MO	No. 12 Missouri	31–7
60	November 2, 1974	Manhattan, KS	Missouri	52–15
61	October 25, 1975	Columbia, MO	No. 15 Missouri	35–3
62	October 9, 1976	Manhattan, KS	No. 9 Missouri	28–21
63	October 22, 1977	Columbia, MO	Missouri	28–13
64	October 21, 1978	Manhattan, KS	No. 13 Missouri	56–14
65	October 27, 1979	Columbia, MO	Kansas State	19–3
66	October 25, 1980	Manhattan, KS	No. 16 Missouri	13–3
67	October 10, 1981	Columbia, MO	No. 13 Missouri	58–13
68	October 9, 1982	Manhattan, KS	Tie	7–7
69	October 22, 1983	Columbia, MO	Missouri	38–0
70	October 20, 1984	Manhattan, KS	Missouri	61–21
71	October 26, 1985	Columbia, MO	Kansas State	20–17
72	October 25, 1986	Manhattan, KS	Missouri	17–6
73	October 10, 1987	Columbia, MO	Missouri	34–10
74	October 8, 1988	Manhattan, KS	Missouri	52–21
75	October 21, 1989	Manhattan, KS	Missouri	21–9
76	October 20, 1990	Columbia, MO	Missouri	31–21
77	November 16, 1991	Manhattan, KS	Kansas State	32–0
78	November 14, 1992	Columbia, MO	Missouri	27–14
79	November 13, 1993	Manhattan, KS	No. 24 Kansas State	31–21
80	November 12, 1994	Columbia, MO	No. 11 Kansas State	21–18
81	October 7, 1995	Manhattan, KS	No. 13 Kansas State	30–0
82	October 12, 1996	Columbia, MO	No. 22 Kansas State	35–10
83	October 11, 1997	Manhattan, KS	No. 22 Kansas State	41–11
84	November 21, 1998	Columbia, MO	No. 2 Kansas State	31–25
85	November 20, 1999	Manhattan, KS	No. 9 Kansas State	66–0
86	November 18, 2000	Columbia, MO	No. 9 Kansas State	28–24
87	November 24, 2001	Manhattan, KS	Kansas State	21–3
88	November 23, 2002	Columbia, MO	No. 10 Kansas State	38–0
89	November 22, 2003	Manhattan, KS	No. 19 Kansas State	24–14
90	November 6, 2004	Columbia, MO	Kansas State	35–24
91	November 19, 2005	Manhattan, KS	Kansas State	36–28
92	October 21, 2006	Columbia, MO	No. 24 Missouri	41–21
93	November 17, 2007	Manhattan, KS	No. 6 Missouri	49–32
94	November 8, 2008	Columbia, MO	No. 13 Missouri	41–24
95	November 14, 2009	Manhattan, KS	Missouri	38–12
96	November 13, 2010	Columbia, MO	No. 20 Missouri	38–28
97	October 8, 2011	Manhattan, KS	No. 20 Kansas State	24–17
98	September 10, 2022	Manhattan, KS	Kansas State	40–12
99	September 16, 2023	Columbia, MO	Missouri	30–27
Series: Missouri leads 61–33–5

Game results sources:

== See also ==
- List of NCAA college football rivalry games
