= Brooklyn High School (Ohio) =

Location
- 9200 Biddulph Road; Brooklyn; Brooklyn, (Cuyahoga County), Ohio 44144; United States; 41.4301°N 81.7494°W

Information
- Type: Public, Coeducational high school
- School district: Brooklyn City School District
- Superintendent: Theodore Caleris
- Principal: Jean Capacetti
- Staff: 53
- Teaching staff: 30.50 (FTE)
- Grades: 8-12
- Enrollment: 470 (as of 2024-2025 school year)
- Student to teacher ratio: 15.54
- Colors: Blue and gold
- Slogan: WHERE EXCELLENCE ISN'T SIMPLY ACHIEVED, IT'S EXPECTED!
- Fight song: Hail to the Varsity
- Athletics conference: Chagrin Valley Conference
- Sports: Wrestling, football, baseball, softball, boys' and girls' basketball, boys' and girls' soccer, hockey, track and field, golf, and volleyball
- Team name: Hurricanes
- Rival: James Ford Rhodes Rams Lutheran High School West Longhorns
- Newspaper: The Hurricane's Eye
- Yearbook: Eaglet
- Website: brooklyn.k12.oh.us

Brooklyn High School is a public high school located in Brooklyn, Ohio. It is the only high school in the Brooklyn City School District.

The school colors are royal blue and gold. The sports teams are named the Hurricanes or the 'Canes (Hurcs was also used as a nickname in the past). Athletically, the school is a member of the Chagrin Valley Conference and the Greater Cleveland High School Hockey League. The school was designated a Historic Rock and Roll Landmark in 1998 by the Rock and Roll Hall of Fame and Museum.

== Hockey ==
In the 2008-2009 season, under its new coach, the team finished with a perfect 10-0-0 record in the GCHSHL's Blue Central Division, and went on to its first conference championship since 1993. This marked a major turnaround from the 2006-2007, season when the Hurricanes lost all 27 of their games, many by blowout scores such as 26-0 and 21-1. In 2017 under Coach Ryan Kelber, the 'Canes went 12-0 in league play, collecting a Blue South Divisions title. The team then went on to win two more Blue South Division Titles in the next two years

== Marching band ==
The Brooklyn Hurricane Marching Band, established in 1947, is a staple in the community. About 25% of the student body is made up of marching band members. The band has had an array of directors with a variety of marching styles. Currently, the director is Sean Sullivan, with assistant director Robert Black, as well as Hurricette dance line advisor Kristen Sullivan. The band performs at many shows, band festivals, and competitions and is considered one of the most active bands in the conference.

== Elvis visit ==
The school gained notoriety on October 20, 1955, when Elvis Presley performed in its auditorium. It was the first concert Elvis performed in the northern United States. It is also believed to be the first filmed concert in Elvis' career. Nearly a year later, he appeared on The Ed Sullivan Show for the first time.

Elvis was not the headliner at the concert organized by legendary Cleveland DJ Bill Randle. The other, then-more popular performers were Bill Haley & His Comets, the Four Lads, and Pat Boone.

On October 20, 2005, some of the acts returned to participate in an anniversary event for this visit. Among the acts were Priscilla Wright and Bill Haley's Original Comets. The BHS Chorale also performed a song with Priscilla Wright.

== Notable alumni ==
- Clint Nageotte, former MLB player (Seattle Mariners)
- Frank Tracz, band conductor and paedagogue, longtime director of bands at Kansas State University
