= Morgan Burns =

American football player (born 1993)

Profile
- Position: Cornerback

Personal information
- Born: May 19, 1993 (age 33); Wichita, Kansas
- Listed height: 5 ft 11 in (1.80 m)
- Listed weight: 201 lb (91 kg)

Career information
- High school: Trinity Academy
- College: Kansas State
- NFL draft: 2016: undrafted

Career history
- Tennessee Titans (2016)*
- * Offseason or practice squad member only

Awards and highlights
- Big 12 Special Teams Player of the Year (2015); First-team All-Big 12 (2015)
- Stats at Pro Football Reference

Morgan Scott Burns (born May 19, 1993) is an American former football cornerback for the Kansas State Wildcats. In 2015, he won the Big 12 Special Teams Player of the Year. He signed a contract with the Tennessee Titans as a free agent as of April 30, 2016. He subsequently retired from professional football to pursue a career in the ministry. He formerly worked at City Life in Wichita, Kansas, as a youth pastor, but has recently started his own church.
