= Frank Tracz =

Band Director

- Born: Francis Carl Tracz, Jr. 18 January 1956 (age 70)
- Origin: Cleveland, Ohio
- Education: The Ohio State University (BME, Ph.D.); University of Wisconsin (MME)
- Occupations: Conductor; educator; pedagogue
- Years active: 1969–present

Francis Carl Tracz, Jr. (/treis/; born January 18, 1956) is an American band conductor, educator, and pedagogue. From 1993 to 2026 he served as the director of bands at Kansas State University. He serves as the head director of the Kansas State University Marching Band and director of the K-State Wind Ensemble. Under his direction, the marching band was awarded the Sudler Trophy, an honor given to collegiate marching bands that demonstrate the highest musical standards.

== Early life ==
Tracz was born on January 18, 1956 in Cleveland, Ohio to Frank and Irene Tracz. He attended Brooklyn High School, where he participated in numerous extracurriculars, including band.

== Education ==
Tracz received his B.M.E from The Ohio State University, where he marched on the drum line. He then went on to receive his Masters degree at the University of Wisconsin. He returned to The Ohio State University to receive his doctorate degree in 1987, where he studied conducting with Craig Kirchhoff, music education with A. Peter Costanza and Jere Forsyth, and marching band techniques with Jon A. Woods.

== Career ==
After finishing his master's degree, he taught band at West Geauga High School in Chesterland, Ohio from 1980 to 1984.

After completing his doctorate, he served as assistant director of bands at Syracuse University from 1987 to 1991 and later as director of bands at Morehead State University from 1991 to 1993 before being hired by Kansas State University.

=== Kansas State University ===
Tracz became the director of bands at Kansas State University in 1993.

In 2023, construction of the Tracz Family Band Hall was completed. The band hall, named after Tracz, became the new facility for the marching band.

On August 11, 2025, Tracz announced during the pre-season marching band camp that he will retire at the end of the 2025-2026 school year. On December 14, 2025, Tracz announced that Dr. Alexander Wimmer, associate director of bands at Kansas State University and a former student of Tracz, will succeed him as director of bands.

== Controversy ==
In 2015, Tracz received a one-game suspension when the band's formation of the Starship Enterprise crashing into the Kansas Jayhawks mascot resembled a penis. He defended the formation while also apologizing for its "misinterpretation", stating that he had "absolutely no disrespect or malice toward the University of Kansas."

== Personal life ==
Tracz and his wife Geralyn live in Manhattan, Kansas. They have three children and one grandchild.
