= Historic Rock and Roll Landmark =

Historic Rock and Roll Landmarks is a program administered by the Rock and Roll Hall of Fame and Museum in Cleveland, Ohio, United States, through its Landmark Series to designate structures or locations that have played an important role in rock and roll history.

== Listings ==
- Brooklyn High School, Brooklyn, Ohio (designated 1998)
- Whisky a Go Go, West Hollywood, California (inducted 2007)
- King Records (USA), Cincinnati, Ohio (inducted 2008)
- The Crossroads, Clarksdale, Mississippi
- Leo's Casino, Cleveland, Ohio (designated 1999)
- Corner Tavern, Cleveland, Ohio (designated 2002)
- WJW (AM), Cleveland, Ohio
- WEWS-TV, Cleveland, Ohio
- Surf Ballroom, Clear Lake, Iowa (designated 2009)
- Austin City Limits Studio, KRLU –TV, Austin, Texas (designated 2009)
- Cosimo Matassa’s J&M Recording Studio, New Orleans, Louisiana (designated 2010)
- Ryman Auditorium, Nashville, Tennessee (Designated 2022)
