= Surf Ballroom =

Event venue in Clear Lake, Iowa

- U.S. National Register of Historic Places
- U.S. National Historic Landmark
- Historic Rock and Roll Landmark
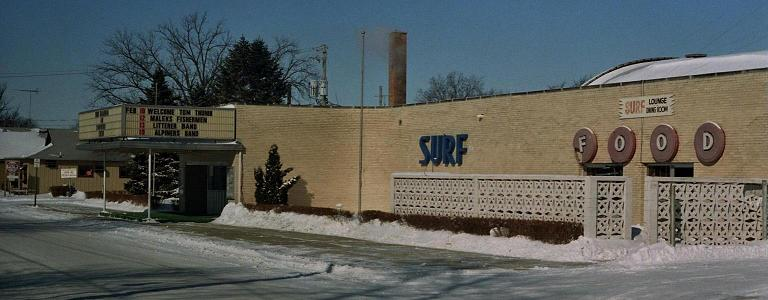
- The Surf in February 1988

- Location within Iowa Location within the United States
- Location: Clear Lake, Iowa, US
- Coordinates: 43°08′24″N 93°23′22″W
- Built: 1948
- NRHP reference No.: 10000261, 100006243

Significant dates
- Added to NRHP: September 6, 2011
- Designated NHL: January 13, 2021
- Designated HRRL: January 27, 2009

The Surf Ballroom (also called the Surf) is a Historic Rock and Roll Landmark at 460 North Shore Drive, Clear Lake, Iowa, United States. The Surf is closely associated with the event known colloquially as "The Day the Music Died" – early rock and roll stars Buddy Holly, Ritchie Valens, and J. P. "The Big Bopper" Richardson gave their last performances at the Surf on February 2, 1959, as part of the "Winter Dance Party Tour".

On September 6, 2011, The Surf Ballroom was added to the National Register of Historic Places. In 2021, it was named a National Historic Landmark.

== Name and history ==
The original Surf Ballroom opened on April 17, 1933. It was named that because the original owners wanted patrons to feel like they were at a surf beach club. Murals were painted on the club walls depicting ocean waves, boats on the water, and palm trees. The furniture is bamboo and rattan, giving a South Sea Islands ambiance. Several fake palm trees rise on each side of the stage. Clouds are painted on the ceiling to give a feeling of dancing outdoors by the ocean.

It burned down on April 20, 1947, at an estimated loss of $250,000. On July 1, 1948, it reopened, having been rebuilt across the street from its original location. It still hosts numerous events year round and has a seating capacity of 2,100 and a 6,300-square-foot (590 m^{2}) dance floor. The facility includes a museum of music memorabilia, a Wall of Fame including many of the many famous artists who performed at the venue, and a souvenir shop.

The Surf Ballroom is currently owned by the Snyder family of Clear Lake and is open to the public daily. The exterior of the ballroom has changed very little since the 1950s. Backstage, in an area known as "The Green Room," acts that have performed on the ballroom's historic stage, such as Little River Band, Loverboy, The Righteous Brothers, The Temptations, The Beach Boys, Waylon Jennings (before becoming a popular country musician, he worked as Buddy Holly's bassist during the infamous "Winter Dance Party" tour in 1959), and Bobby Rydell have signed their names on the whitewashed walls, and photos of them have been placed on a wall alongside those of early rock-and-roll pioneers.

Midwestern music acts that have performed at the Surf Ballroom include childhood Iowa residents The Everly Brothers in '66, Styx, and Soul Asylum.

After decades of declining attendance, the venue was sold to Bruce and Sue Christensen, self-described Buddy Holly fans from Florida, in March 1991. Despite their best efforts, the Christensens were forced to close the Surf on March 22, 1994. The closed building was sold to local businessman Dean Snyder, who extensively renovated the ballroom, restoring it to its 1948 appearance, and reopened it in time for the next Winter Dance Party anniversary performance on February 2, 1995.

In 1998, the Surf Ballroom was inducted into the Iowa Rock 'n' Roll Hall of Fame in the Ballroom category. The Rock and Roll Hall of Fame and Museum designated the Surf Ballroom a historical landmark on January 27, 2009. The ceremony giving landmark status to the site kicked off a week-long celebration of the 50th anniversary of the February 2, 1959, "Winter Dance Party" concert and the tragic incident of February 3, 1959.

== The Day the Music Died ==
Holly, Valens, and Richardson left The Surf immediately after the show, going to the nearby Mason City airport and chartering a small plane to take them to Fargo, North Dakota, to prepare for their next show at the Moorhead Armory in Moorhead, Minnesota. The plane took off at 12:55 AM Central Time on Tuesday, February 3, 1959. Shortly after takeoff, the plane crashed, killing everyone aboard.

A concrete monument was erected outside The Surf, and the ballroom is adorned with large pictures of the three musicians. In his honor, a street flanking the facility's east property line is named Buddy Holly Place.

== Winter Dance Party tribute event ==
Each February since 1979, the Surf Ballroom has hosted a "Winter Dance Party" tribute show to honor the lives and legacies of the three stars.

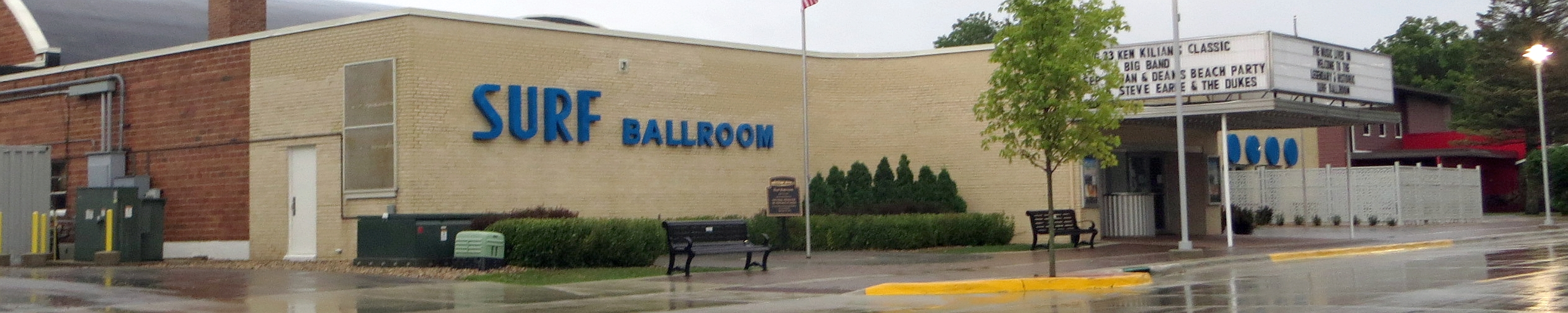
Surf Ballroom in 2015
