= Kansas State University Marching Band =

College marching band in Manhattan, Kansas

The Pride of Wildcat Land
- School: Kansas State University
- Location: Manhattan, Kansas
- Conference: Big 12
- Founded: 1887; 139 years ago
- Director: Alexander Wimmer
- Associate Director: Allen Parrish
- Assistant Director: Alex "Xan" Perkins
- Members: approx. 400 + (2023)
- Fight song: "Wildcat Victory"
- Website: www.k-state.edu/band

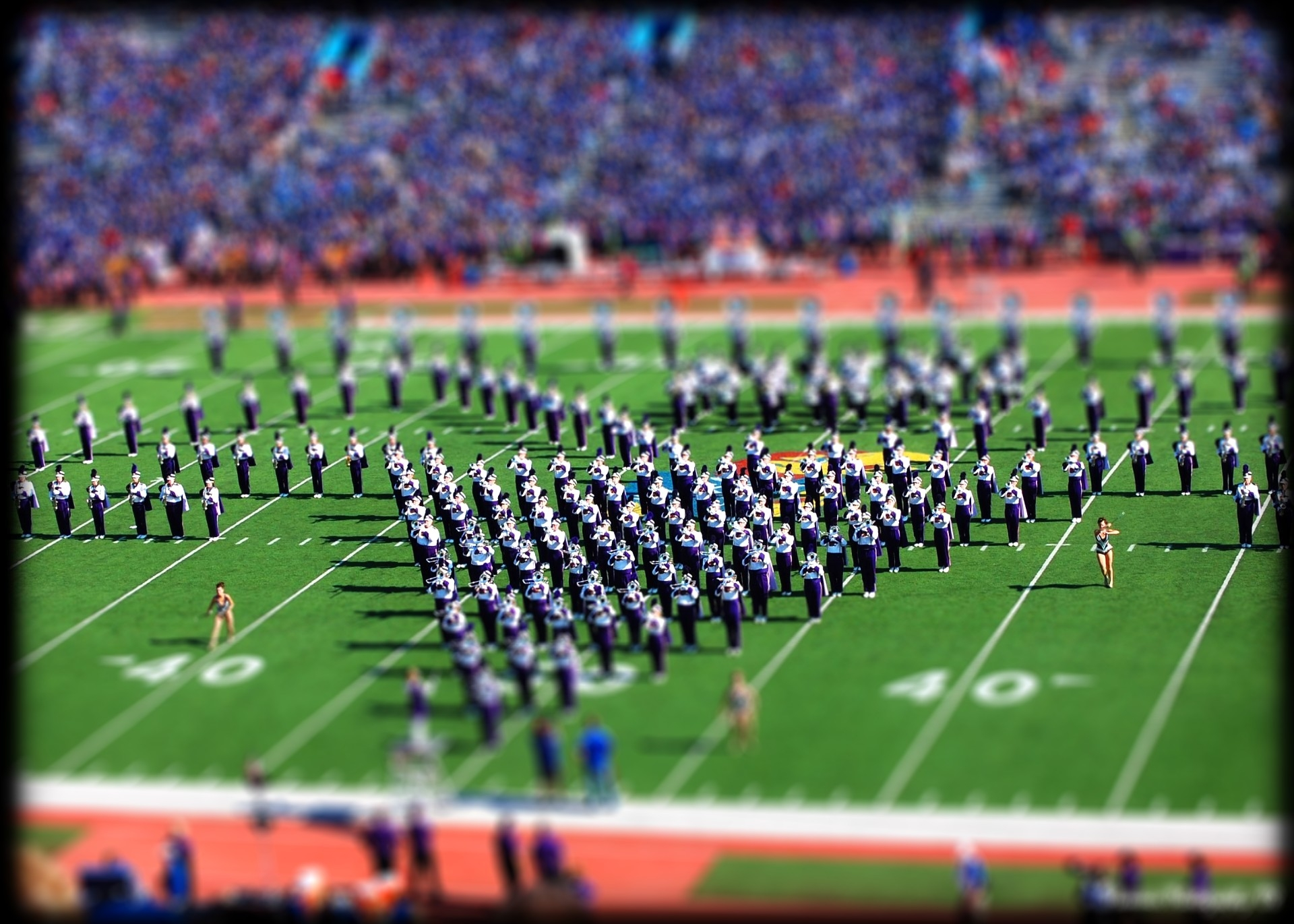
The KSU Marching Band performs at halftime of a K-State football game at the University of Kansas in 2008

The Kansas State University Marching Band, also known as "The Pride of Wildcat Land" or just The Pride, is a 400+ piece marching band consisting of woodwinds, brass, percussion, color guard, dancers, and twirlers. It is the official band of Kansas State University.

In 2015, the Pride of Wildcat Land was awarded the Sudler Trophy, which honors the nation's top collegiate marching bands.

== History ==
In 1887 Professor Alexander Brown organized fifteen student-musicians into the first band at the Kansas State Agricultural College. The first involvement with athletics came when the band accompanied the baseball team to a game in 1899. Since then, the Kansas State Marching Band, also known as the "Pride of Wildcat Land", has grown to more than 410 members. The University band represents the school, the city and community of Manhattan, and the state of Kansas each year at home and across the country at home games, NFL exhibition, bowl games, parades and festivals, and alumni, charity, and community events.

The "Pride" has been invited to many out-of-town venues, appearing before huge audiences, both live and on television. Occasionally the band travels to perform at a Kansas City Chiefs' home game. They have also performed on three occasions at Texas Stadium for Dallas Cowboys home games, and twice at Denver Broncos home games. The K-State band performed at both the 1974 NFL ProBowl and in the 1977 Texas State Fair. In May 1980, the K-State band performed at Wembley Stadium and Hyde Park in London, England. In more recent years, the "Pride of Wildcat Land" has accompanied the K-State football team to multiple bowl appearances, including:

- Independence Bowl (1982)
- Copper Bowl (1993)
- Holiday Bowl (1995, 1999, 2002)
- Cotton Bowl Classic (1997, 2001, 2012)
- Fiesta Bowl (1997, 2004, 2012)
- Alamo Bowl (1998, 2015)
- Insight.com Bowl (2001)
- Texas Bowl (2006, 2016, 2021)
- Pinstripe Bowl (2010)
- Buffalo Wild Wings Bowl (2013)
- Liberty Bowl (2015, 2019)
- Cactus Bowl (2017)
- Rate Bowl (2024)

A memorable performance venue every year for many decades is known as K-State Band Day. Now attracting approximately 2000 high school and middle school students converging each year on Manhattan, the day-long event includes a morning parade through the center of town, and a massed band performance at half time of that afternoon's home football game at Bill Snyder Family Stadium. On September 15, 1984 the K-State Band Day was recognized in the Guinness Book of World Records. In conjunction with that year's Band Day, sixty-seven school bands joined the K-State Band on the field, creating a 3,144 piece marching band, which put them in the book as the world's largest marching band.

In 2017, Director Frank Tracz initiated a new attraction for high school students called the All Star Band. This band consists of high school students from area high schools who are recognized as the best from their school. The high school band puts a show together to perform at halftime. After their show they are joined by the members of the Pride of Wildcatland and perform a show with all members on the field, and then playing traditions songs such as the Fight Song and Wabash Cannonball with the All Star Band members. In 2017 this day was combined with alumni band day, and band alumni of all ages joined the high school and college marching members, totaling almost 600 people on the field. These alumni band members joined the K-State and All Star bands for the playing of the Fight Song and Wabash Cannonball.

== Membership ==
Membership in the "Pride of Wildcat Land" is open to all Kansas State students, regardless of major. Some members receive scholarship aid for their participation in the band. Membership to the marching band is earned every year on an audition basis the week prior to the start of classes. Auditions occur in two parts, musicianship and marching. Members are expected to not only have pristine marching technique but also have their entire pregame memorized prior to their audition. Band members come from schools throughout the state and across the nation, and their educational goals are as diverse as their backgrounds. Students representing every college on campus, and nearly every curriculum, work many hours a week in rehearsal during the marching season.

The marching band does not only consist of the musicians holding the instruments. Also part of the band are the Wildcat Twirlers, Color Guard, and Classy Cats dance team. These positions are audition only on a yearly basis. The members of these three groups practice with the marching band and are just as much part of the band as the musicians.

== Songs of Kansas State University ==
=== Fight song ===
The 2006 KSU Marching Band marching in block band to "Wildcat Victory"

Wildcat Victory is the official fight song of Kansas State University. It was originally written, verse and chorus, by music department student Harry Erickson in 1927, but over time became known to K-State fans with the chorus section on its own. The band presents Wildcat Victory in various forms throughout athletic events, from a short excerpt of the introduction to a full version, complete with singing.

Fight, you K-State Wildcats
For Alma Mater fight-fight-fight!
Glory in the combat
For the purple and the white.

Faithful to our colors
We will ever be,
Fighting ever fighting for a
Wildcat victory!

Go State!

=== Alma Mater ===
The KSU Alma Mater was officially selected as the result of a campus-wide competition in 1888. The original work, composed by H.W. Jones ('88), was four stanzas long, including the chorus. Following a school name change, the song was altered by removing the letters KSAC (Kansas State Agricultural College), replacing them with KSU. The length of the piece was also shortened to two stanzas.

I know a spot that I love full well,
'Tis not in forest nor yet in dell;
Ever it holds me with magic spell,
I think of thee, Alma Mater.

KSU, we'll carry thy banner high.
KSU, long, long may thy colors fly.
Loyal to thee, thy children will swell the cry.
Hail, hail, hail, Alma Mater.

=== Others ===
In October, 1928, John Philip Sousa was to make an appearance at K-State. A petition, signed by most of the student body, was presented to Sousa on October 10, requesting that he compose a Kansas State Agricultural College march. Sousa delivered the piano arrangement of Kansas Wildcat March to the Music Department in the spring of 1931. It is now an integral part of the pregame show at every football game, and is normally performed in parades as well.

The Wabash Cannonball (arranged by Joel Leach) is known as a second fight song for K-State. Wabash Cannonball was first performed for an athletic event at K-State on December 16, 1968. It was the only selection in the band's repertoire that evening for a home basketball game at Ahearn Fieldhouse. Just three nights prior, arsonists had set fire to Nichols Hall, at that time the home of the Music Department, destroying all of the departments assets, including the sheet music. The band director at that time, Phil Hewett, just happened to have taken this one piece home from the library that very night to do some work on the arrangement, thus making it the only selection to survive the fire. Since then, the Wabash Cannonball has come to represent the survival of the underdog in the hearts and minds of all true K-State fans, and has earned a secure place in the KSUMB's history and traditions.
