= 2022 Sugar Bowl =

2022 Sugar Bowl, may refer to:

- 2022 Sugar Bowl (January), a bowl game on January 1, 2022, following the 2021 season, between Baylor and Ole Miss
- 2022 Sugar Bowl (December), a bowl game on December 31, 2022, following the 2022 season, between Kansas State and Alabama
