= Wildcat Victory =

"Wildcat Victory "

Song
- Written: 1927
- Genre: Fight song
- Songwriter(s): Harry E. Erickson

The 2006 KSU Marching Band marching to "Wildcat Victory"

"Wildcat Victory" is Kansas State University's official fight song. It was written in 1927 by Harry E. Erickson, when the school was still known as Kansas State Agricultural College. In addition to this song, the Kansas State University Marching Band also commonly plays "Wabash Cannonball" as an alternate fight song. John Philip Sousa's "Kansas Wildcats March," written for the school, is Kansas State's official march.

On occasion, "Wildcat Victory" may be played for notable alumnus of Kansas State University by other bands.

== Other uses ==
Lamar University's fight song, "Big Red," uses the same tune as "Wildcat Victory." The tune is also used across the country by various high schools as their fight song.
