= Willie the Wildcat (Kansas State) =

Mascot for the Kansas State Wildcats

Willie Wildcat
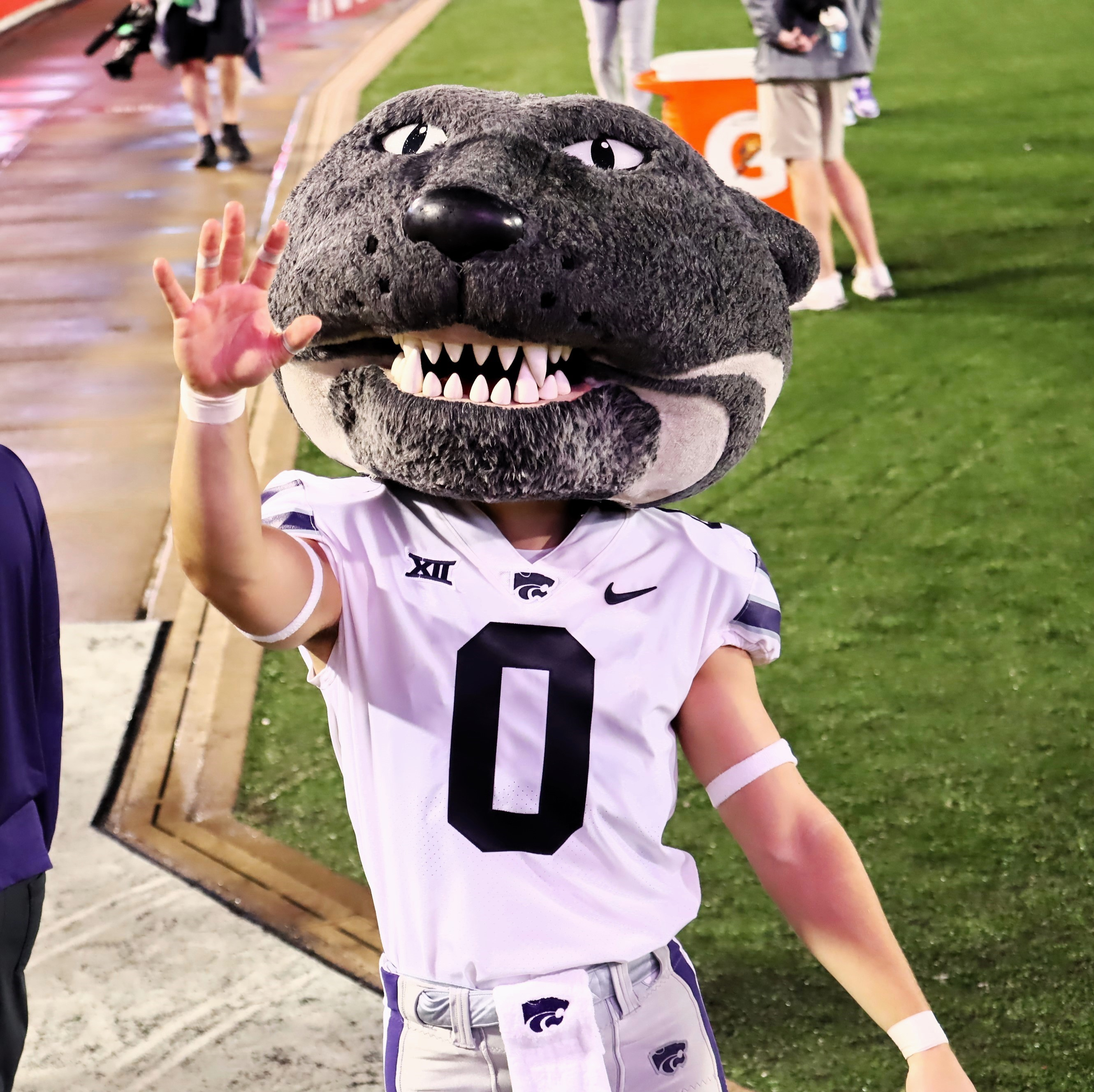
- Willie in 2024
- University: Kansas State University
- Conference: Big 12
- Description: A student bedecked in an oversized Wildcat head
- First seen: 1947
- Website: Official Site

Willie Wildcat is the official mascot for the Kansas State Wildcats. He is typically depicted as having a human body with a giant wildcat head.

== History ==
Kansas State's athletic teams first acquired the nickname "Aggies," during the start of the 20th century. This name lives on in the entertainment district that abuts the University, Aggieville.

=== Adoption of the nickname ===
- 1906-1909: a black Labrador named Boscoe represented K-State at baseball and football games.
- 1915: Prior to the football season, new coach John Bender gave his squad the nickname "Wildcats."
- 1917: Under Coach Z.G. Clevenger the school teams became known as the "Aggies" or "Farmers."
- 1920: Coach Charles Bachman took over the football program, again renaming the team the "Wildcats." This time the nickname stuck.
- 1922-1978: A real bobcat named Touchdown (I-XI), served as team mascot at games. "Touchdown" could be found at Sunset Zoo in Manhattan until the 1980s. Touchdown I was injured in Idaho by an encounter with a porcupine and was donated to K.S.A.C. after treatment. The animal did not attend a college football game; it died from pneumonia shortly after it arrived in Manhattan. Touchdown II soon replaced TD I and was at K-State for 14 years.

=== Costumed Mascot ===
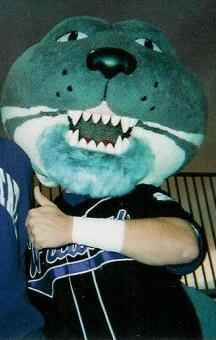
Willie Wildcat at a baseball game

The first costumed Willie mascot appeared in 1947. Willie has changed many times, and currently, has an appearance that is heavily influenced by the team's Powercat logo:

- 1947: K-State's first costumed mascot, "Sparky," appeared at the September football game against Oklahoma A&M. This was by Manhattan High student Andrea Simmons Andersen during halftime performing gymnastics for the crowd in a red-brown wildcat costume with black stripes and a tail. Lack of winning games resulted in fans replacing the young girl with a college student. She was to be the only female to be a K-State mascot. (First Generation)
- 1960s: Fraternity members took responsibility of wearing the Willie Wildcat costume and cheering at games. The original K-State Willie costume, which debuted in 1964, was purple in color with large ears that somewhat resembled Mickey Mouse. (Second Generation)
- 1967-1980: Sculptor Jim Hagan created a new, "meaner-looking" Willie head with coyote and wolf hair. (Third Generation)
- 1980-1993: A second Willie head made in 1967 by Jim Hagan is used.
- 1985: The "beefed-up" Willie appeared while still using third generation style head. (Fourth Generation)
- 1994-1996: Last pre-Powercat Willie (Fifth Generation)

Willie Wildcat is known to wear uniforms matching the team and sport he is attending at the time. Of these include Football, Volleyball, Men's and Women's Basketball, Baseball, and Soccer. Additionally, Willie is known to wear outfits specific for special events such as a tuxedo, biker garb for Harley Day, Army Fatigues for Fort Riley Day, costumes for Halloween, and various other outfits for themed nights.

=== Powercat Logo ===
In 1989, newly hired football coach Bill Snyder wanted a new logo to change the image of a program known at the time as a chronic loser. Tom Bookwalter, a Kansas native and K-State art professor, created a stylized wildcat's head known as the "Powercat," that was added to the football team's helmets. By the mid-1990s, due to the football team's rapid rise, the Powercat had replaced the cartoon-style Willie as K-State's primary logo. The logo has been adopted by a large number of high schools and other sports organizations. Recognizing its popularity, Kansas State allows teams to license the Powercat trademark for the token sum of $1 paid every two years, under the sole condition that the licensing team's colors are not red and blue (the colors of arch-rivals Kansas).

In 1997, the current "21st Century" Willie was created. Willie has gray fur, with two white stripes to resemble the Powercat logo. This head weighs eleven pounds. Willie can be seen at various K-State sporting events, often dressed as an athlete.

== Personality ==
Willie is known to be tough but also mischievous. He is K-State's #1 fan. The student inside the mascot costume (whose identity is kept secret) changes every few years, and the persona of Willie has remained the same throughout. Willie has been known to crowd surf and he also does one push-up for each point on the board for K-State when the Wildcats score a touchdown or make a field goal at football games. He also leads crowds in his signature K-S-U chant in which he moves his arms and legs to form a 'K'-'S'-'U' then fist pumps to signal the crowd to yell "WILDCATS" 3 times in a row. Willie also signs various objects using his iconic signature, signing his name "Willie Wildcat" in which a paw print is drawn and used in place of the "W" in both words.
