= 1998 Tulsa Golden Hurricane football team =

American college football season

1998 Tulsa Golden Hurricane football
- Conference: Western Athletic Conference
- Mountain Division
- Record: 4–7 (2–6 WAC)
- Head coach: David Rader (11th season)
- Offensive coordinator: Rockey Felker (4th season)
- Defensive coordinator: Pat Henderson (2nd season)
- Home stadium: Skelly Stadium

1998 Western Athletic Conference football standings
| | Conf. | | | Overall |
| Team | W | | L | W | | L |
|---|---|---|---|---|---|---|
Mountain Division
| No. 13 Air Force x$ | 7 | – | 1 | 12 | – | 1 |
| Wyoming | 6 | – | 2 | 8 | – | 3 |
| Colorado State | 5 | – | 3 | 8 | – | 4 |
| Rice | 5 | – | 3 | 5 | – | 6 |
| TCU | 4 | – | 4 | 7 | – | 5 |
| Tulsa | 2 | – | 6 | 4 | – | 7 |
| SMU | 1 | – | 1 | 0 | – | 1 |
| UNLV | 0 | – | 8 | 0 | – | 11 |
Pacific Division
| BYU xy | 7 | – | 1 | 9 | – | 5 |
| San Diego State x | 7 | – | 1 | 7 | – | 5 |
| Utah | 5 | – | 3 | 7 | – | 4 |
| Fresno State | 5 | – | 3 | 5 | – | 6 |
| San Jose State | 3 | – | 5 | 4 | – | 8 |
| UTEP | 3 | – | 5 | 3 | – | 8 |
| New Mexico | 1 | – | 7 | 3 | – | 9 |
| Hawaii | 0 | – | 8 | 0 | – | 12 |
Championship: Air Force 20, BYU 13
$ – Conference champion; x – Division champion/co-champions; y – Championship game participant; Rankings from AP Poll

The 1998 Tulsa Golden Hurricane football team represented the University of Tulsa during the 1998 NCAA Division I-A football season. In their eleventh year under head coach David Rader, the Golden Hurricane compiled a 4–7 record. The team's statistical leaders included quarterback John Fitzgerald with 1,457 passing yards, Reggie Williams and Charlie Higgins, each with 447 rushing yards, and Wes Caswell with 598 receiving yards.

== Schedule ==
| Date | Opponent | Site | Result | Attendance | Source |
|---|---|---|---|---|---|
| September 5 | Southwest Missouri State* | Skelly Stadium; Tulsa, OK | W 49–14 | 24,332 | |
| September 12 | Oklahoma State* | Skelly Stadium; Tulsa, OK (rivalry) | W 35–20 | 40,385 | |
| September 19 | at No. 19 West Virginia* | Mountaineer Field; Morgantown, WV | L 21–44 | 48,819 | |
| October 3 | San Diego State^{†} | Skelly Stadium; Tulsa, OK | L 14–24 | 18,320 | |
| October 10 | at Colorado State | Hughes Stadium; Fort Collins, CO | L 7–34 | 31,575 | |
| October 17 | at Rice | Rice Stadium; Houston, TX | L 10–14 | 18,116 | |
| October 24 | Air Force | Skelly Stadium; Tulsa, OK | L 21–42 | 21,763 | |
| October 31 | at UNLV | Sam Boyd Stadium; Paradise, NV | W 20–16 | 15,187 | |
| November 7 | at SMU | Cotton Bowl; Dallas, TX | L 3–33 | 11,143 | |
| November 14 | TCU | Skelly Stadium; Tulsa, OK | L 7–17 | 12,628 | |
| November 21 | Wyoming | Skelly Stadium; Tulsa, OK | W 35–0 | 12,054 | |
*Non-conference game; ^{†}Homecoming; Rankings from AP Poll released prior to the game

== Roster ==
1998 Tulsa Golden Hurricane football team roster
| Players | | | Coaches |
|---|---|---|---|
| Offense: Pos. / # / Name / Class; OL / 72 / Kevin Shaffer / Fr | Defense: Pos. / # / Name / Class; DB / 4 / Todd Franz / Jr | Special teams: Pos. / # / Name / Class | Head coach: David Rader; Coordinators/assistant coaches Legend: (C) Team captain; (S) Suspended; (I) Ineligible; Injured; Redshirt; Roster |
