= 1998 San Diego State Aztecs football team =

American college football season

1998 San Diego State Aztecs football

WAC Pacific Division co-champion

Las Vegas Bowl, L 13–20 vs. North Carolina
- Conference: Western Athletic Conference
- Pacific Division
- Record: 7–5 (7–1 WAC)
- Head coach: Ted Tollner (5th season)
- Offensive coordinator: Dave Lay (6th season)
- Offensive scheme: Pro-style
- Defensive coordinator: Claude Gilbert (8th season)
- Base defense: 4–3
- Home stadium: Qualcomm Stadium

1998 Western Athletic Conference football standings
	Conf.			Overall
Team	W		L	W		L
Mountain Division
No. 13 Air Force x$	7	–	1	12	–	1
Wyoming	6	–	2	8	–	3
Colorado State	5	–	3	8	–	4
Rice	5	–	3	5	–	6
TCU	4	–	4	7	–	5
Tulsa	2	–	6	4	–	7
SMU	1	–	1	0	–	1
UNLV	0	–	8	0	–	11
Pacific Division
BYU xy	7	–	1	9	–	5
San Diego State x	7	–	1	7	–	5
Utah	5	–	3	7	–	4
Fresno State	5	–	3	5	–	6
San Jose State	3	–	5	4	–	8
UTEP	3	–	5	3	–	8
New Mexico	1	–	7	3	–	9
Hawaii	0	–	8	0	–	12
Championship: Air Force 20, BYU 13
$ – Conference champion; x – Division champion/co-champions; y – Championship game participant; Rankings from AP Poll

The 1998 San Diego State Aztecs football team represented San Diego State University as a member of the Pacific Division of the Western Athletic Conference (WAC) during the 1998 NCAA Division I-A football season. Led by fifth-year head coach Ted Tollner, the Aztecs compiled an overall record of 7–5 with a mark of 7–1 conference play, sharing the WAC Pacific Division title with BYU. San Diego State was invited to the Las Vegas Bowl, where the Aztecs lost to North Carolina. The team played home games at Jack Murphy Stadium in San Diego.

This was the last season for the Aztecs in the WAC, as they became a charter member of the Mountain West Conference in the 1999 season.

== Schedule ==
Date	Opponent	Site	TV	Result	Attendance	Source
September 5	No. 20 Wisconsin*	Qualcomm Stadium; San Diego, CA	Cox 4	L 14–26	37,471	
September 12	at No. 22 USC*	Los Angeles Memorial Coliseum; Los Angeles, CA	Fox West 2	L 6–35	49,927	
September 24	No. 16 Arizona*	Qualcomm Stadium; San Diego, CA	ESPN	L 16–35	23,811	
October 3	at Tulsa	Skelly Stadium; Tulsa, OK		W 24–14	18,320	
October 9	Hawaii	Qualcomm Stadium; San Diego, CA	Cox 4	W 35–13	20,320	
October 17	at New Mexico	University Stadium; Albuquerque, NM	Cox 4	W 36–33 ^{OT}	26,187	
October 24	Utah^{†}	Qualcomm Stadium; San Diego, CA	Cox 4	W 21–20 ^{OT}	28,807	
October 29	at BYU	Cougar Stadium; Provo, UT	ESPN	L 0–13	63,496	
November 7	Fresno State	Qualcomm Stadium; San Diego, CA (rivalry)	ABC	W 10–0	22,497	
November 14	at San Jose State	Spartan Stadium; San Jose, CA	Cox 4	W 34–6	12,833	
November 21	UTEP	Qualcomm Stadium; San Diego, CA	Cox 4	W 34–29	22,365	
December 19	vs. North Carolina*	Sam Boyd Stadium; Whitney, NV (Las Vegas Bowl)	ESPN2	L 13–20	21,429	
*Non-conference game; ^{†}Homecoming; Rankings from AP Poll released prior to the game

== Team players in the NFL ==
No SDSU players were selected in the 1999 NFL draft.

The following finished their college career in 1998, were not drafted, but played in the NFL.

Player	Position	First NFL team
Joe Tuipala	Linebacker	2001 Jacksonville Jaguars

== Team awards ==
Award	Player
Most Valuable Player (John Simcox Memorial Trophy)	Damon Gourdine
Outstanding Players (Byron H. Chase Memorial Trophy)	Mike Malano, C Jonas Lewis, RB; Damon Gourdine, WR; Kabeer Gbaja-Biamila, DE; Joe Tuipala, LB; Rico Curtis, FS
Team captains Dr. R. Hardy / C.E. Peterson Memorial Trophy	Brian Russell, Off; Joe Jackson, Def; Joe Tuipala, Def; Mike Duran, Special Teams; Mac Cleary, Special Teams
Most Inspirational Player	Joe Jackson; Scottie Nicholson
