= 1998 San Jose State Spartans football team =

American college football season

1998 San Jose State Spartans football
- Conference: Western Athletic Conference
- Pacific Division
- Record: 4–8 (3–5 WAC)
- Head coach: Dave Baldwin (2nd season)
- Defensive coordinator: Todd Throckmorton (1st season)
- Home stadium: Spartan Stadium

1998 Western Athletic Conference football standings
	Conf.			Overall
Team	W		L	W		L
Mountain Division
No. 13 Air Force x$	7	–	1	12	–	1
Wyoming	6	–	2	8	–	3
Colorado State	5	–	3	8	–	4
Rice	5	–	3	5	–	6
TCU	4	–	4	7	–	5
Tulsa	2	–	6	4	–	7
SMU	1	–	1	0	–	1
UNLV	0	–	8	0	–	11
Pacific Division
BYU xy	7	–	1	9	–	5
San Diego State x	7	–	1	7	–	5
Utah	5	–	3	7	–	4
Fresno State	5	–	3	5	–	6
San Jose State	3	–	5	4	–	8
UTEP	3	–	5	3	–	8
New Mexico	1	–	7	3	–	9
Hawaii	0	–	8	0	–	12
Championship: Air Force 20, BYU 13
$ – Conference champion; x – Division champion/co-champions; y – Championship game participant; Rankings from AP Poll

The 1998 San Jose State Spartans football team represented San Jose State University during the 1998 NCAA Division I-A football season as a member of the Western Athletic Conference. The team was led by head coach Dave Baldwin, in his second year as head coach at San Jose State. They played home games at Spartan Stadium in San Jose, California. The Spartans finished the 1998 season with a record of four wins and eight losses (4–8, 3–5 WAC).

== Schedule ==
Date	Opponent	Site	Result	Attendance	Source
September 5	at Stanford*	Stanford Stadium; Stanford, CA (rivalry)	W 35–23	36,396	
September 12	Idaho*	Spartan Stadium; San Jose, CA	L 12–17	12,432	
September 19	at No. 22 Oregon*	Autzen Stadium; Eugene, OR	L 3–58	41,868	
September 26	New Mexico	Spartan Stadium; San Jose, CA	W 37–20	11,447	
October 3	at No. 10 Virginia*	Scott Stadium; Charlottesville, VA	L 14–52	41,100	
October 10	Rice^{†}	Spartan Stadium; San Jose, CA	W 20–17	13,668	
October 17	at UTEP	Sun Bowl; El Paso, TX	L 21–28	21,300	
October 24	at BYU	Cougar Stadium; Provo, UT	L 43–46	62,423	
October 31	Utah	Spartan Stadium; San Jose, CA	L 17–49	12,279	
November 7	at Hawaii	Aloha Stadium; Halawa, HI (rivalry)	W 45–17	26,716	
November 14	San Diego State	Spartan Stadium; San Jose, CA	L 6–34	12,833	
November 21	at Fresno State	Bulldog Stadium; Fresno, CA (rivalry)	L 21–24	34,292	
*Non-conference game; ^{†}Homecoming; Rankings from AP Poll released prior to the game

== Game summaries ==
=== At Stanford ===
	1	2	3	4	Total
Spartans					0
Cardinal					0

=== Idaho ===
	1	2	3	4	Total
Vandals					0
Spartans					0

=== At No. 22 Oregon ===
	1	2	3	4	Total
Spartans					0
No. 22 Ducks					0

=== New Mexico ===
	1	2	3	4	Total
Lobos					0
Spartans					0

=== At No. 10 Virginia ===
	1	2	3	4	Total
Spartans					0
No. 10 Cavaliers					0

=== Rice ===
	1	2	3	4	Total
Owls					0
Spartans					0

=== At UTEP ===
	1	2	3	4	Total
Spartans					0
Miners					0

=== At BYU ===
	1	2	3	4	Total
Spartans	0	0	0	0	0
Cougars					0

=== Utah ===
	1	2	3	4	Total
Utes					0
Spartans					0

=== At Hawaii ===
	1	2	3	4	Total
Spartans					0
Rainbow Warriors					0

=== San Diego State ===
	1	2	3	4	Total
Aztecs					0
Spartans					0

=== At Fresno State ===
	1	2	3	4	Total
Spartans					0
Bulldogs					0

== Team players in the NFL ==
The following were selected in the 1999 NFL draft.

Player	Position	Round	Overall	NFL team
David Loverne	Guard	3	90	New York Jets
Lyle West	Defensive back	6	189	New York Giants

The following finished their college career in 1998, were not drafted, but played in the NFL.

Player	Position	First NFL team
James Hodgins	Fullback	1999 St. Louis Rams
