= 1998 WAC Championship Game =

- Conference Championship
Air Force Falcons	BYU Cougars
(10–1)	(9–3)
20	13
Head coach: Fisher DeBerry	Head coach: LaVell Edwards
AP / Coaches / BCS; 17 / 13 / NR
	1	2	3	4	Total
Air Force	0	0	7	13	20
BYU	0	7	0	6	13
- Date: December 5, 1998
- Season: 1998
- Stadium: Sam Boyd Stadium
- Location: Whitney, Nevada
- Attendance: 32,745

United States TV coverage
- Network: ABC

1998 Western Athletic Conference football standings
	Conf.			Overall
Team	W		L	W		L
Mountain Division
No. 13 Air Force x$	7	–	1	12	–	1
Wyoming	6	–	2	8	–	3
Colorado State	5	–	3	8	–	4
Rice	5	–	3	5	–	6
TCU	4	–	4	7	–	5
Tulsa	2	–	6	4	–	7
SMU	1	–	1	0	–	1
UNLV	0	–	8	0	–	11
Pacific Division
BYU xy	7	–	1	9	–	5
San Diego State x	7	–	1	7	–	5
Utah	5	–	3	7	–	4
Fresno State	5	–	3	5	–	6
San Jose State	3	–	5	4	–	8
UTEP	3	–	5	3	–	8
New Mexico	1	–	7	3	–	9
Hawaii	0	–	8	0	–	12
Championship: Air Force 20, BYU 13
$ – Conference champion; x – Division champion/co-champions; y – Championship game participant; Rankings from AP Poll

The 1998 WAC Championship Game was a college football game played on Saturday, December 5, 1998, at Sam Boyd Stadium in Whitney, Nevada. This was the 3rd and last WAC Championship Game and determined the 1998 champion of the Western Athletic Conference. The game featured the Air Force Falcons, champions of the Mountain division, and the BYU Cougars, champions of the Pacific division. Air Force would win the game 20–13.

== Game summary ==
1998 WAC Championship Game

Quarter	1	2	3	4	Total
No. 17 Air Force	0	0	7	13	20
BYU	0	7	0	6	13

at Sam Boyd Stadium • Whitney, Nevada

- Date: December 5, 1998
- Game attendance: 32,745
- TV: ABC
- WAC game summary

Game information

First quarter

No scoring

Second quarter

- (1:01) BYU – Mike Rigell 13 yard pass from Kevin Feterik, Owen Pochman kick (Drive: 4 plays, 24 yards, 0:43; BYU 7–0)

Third quarter

- (6:39) AFA – Blane Morgan 2 yard run, Jackson Whiting kick (Drive: 5 plays, 51 yards, 1:56; Tied 7–7)

Fourth quarter

- (12:26) BYU – Owen Pochman 32 yard field goal (Drive: 6 plays, 27 yards, 2:48; BYU 10–7)
- (5:44) BYU – Owen Pochman 34 yard field goal (Drive: 8 plays, 49 yards, 4:33; BYU 13–7)
- (3:49) AFA – Matt Farmer 59 yard pass from Blane Morgan, Jackson Whiting kick (Drive: 5 plays, 80 yards, 1:49; AFA 14–13)
- (1:43) AFA – Spanky Gilliam 29 yard run, Jackson Whiting kick blocked (Drive: 4 plays, 42 yards, 0:48; AFA 20–13)

=== Statistics ===
Statistics	AFA	BYU
First downs	11	30
Plays–yards	52–260	90–390
Rushes–yards	39–111	48–132
Passing yards	149	258
Passing: comp–att–int	8–13–0	20–42–1
Time of possession	23:58	36:02

Team	Category	Player	Statistics
Air Force	Passing	Blane Morgan	3–6, 90 yds, 1 TD
Air Force	Rushing	Spanky Gilliam	11 car, 94 yds, 1 TD
Air Force	Receiving	Matt Farmer	2 rec, 79 yds, 1 TD
BYU	Passing	Kevin Feterik	20–42, 258 yds, 1 TD, 1 INT
BYU	Rushing	Ronney Jenkins	25 car, 100 yds
BYU	Receiving	Tevita Ofahengaue	5 rec, 90 yds
