= 1998 New Mexico Lobos football team =

American college football season

1998 New Mexico Lobos football
- Conference: Western Athletic Conference
- Mountain Division
- Record: 3–9 (1–7 WAC)
- Head coach: Rocky Long (1st season)
- Offensive coordinator: Jim Fenwick (1st season)
- Offensive scheme: Multiple
- Defensive coordinator: Bronco Mendenhall (1st season)
- Base defense: 3–3–5
- Home stadium: University Stadium

1998 Western Athletic Conference football standings
	Conf.			Overall
Team	W		L	W		L
Mountain Division
No. 13 Air Force x$	7	–	1	12	–	1
Wyoming	6	–	2	8	–	3
Colorado State	5	–	3	8	–	4
Rice	5	–	3	5	–	6
TCU	4	–	4	7	–	5
Tulsa	2	–	6	4	–	7
SMU	1	–	1	0	–	1
UNLV	0	–	8	0	–	11
Pacific Division
BYU xy	7	–	1	9	–	5
San Diego State x	7	–	1	7	–	5
Utah	5	–	3	7	–	4
Fresno State	5	–	3	5	–	6
San Jose State	3	–	5	4	–	8
UTEP	3	–	5	3	–	8
New Mexico	1	–	7	3	–	9
Hawaii	0	–	8	0	–	12
Championship: Air Force 20, BYU 13
$ – Conference champion; x – Division champion/co-champions; y – Championship game participant; Rankings from AP Poll

The 1998 New Mexico Lobos football team was an American football team that represented the University of New Mexico in the Western Athletic Conference (WAC) during the 1998 NCAA Division I-A football season. In their first season under head coach Rocky Long, the Lobos compiled a 3–9 record (1–7 against WAC opponents) and were outscored by a total of 397 to 274.

The team's statistical leaders included Graham Leigh with 2,608 passing yards, Lennox Gordon with 571 rushing yards, and Martinez Williams with 760 receiving yards and 42 points scored.

== Schedule ==
Date	Opponent	Site	Result	Attendance	Source
September 5	Idaho State*	University Stadium; Albuquerque, NM	W 38–9	28,260	
September 12	Utah State*	University Stadium; Albuquerque, NM	W 39–36	31,267	
September 19	at New Mexico State*	Aggie Memorial Stadium; Las Cruces, NM (rivalry)	L 27–28		
September 26	at San Jose State	Spartan Stadium; San Jose, CA	L 20–37	11,447	
October 3	at Air Force	Falcon Stadium; Colorado Springs, CO	L 14–56	43,575	
October 10	UTEP^{†}	University Stadium; Albuquerque, NM	L 19–22	29,812	
October 17	San Diego State	University Stadium; Albuquerque, NM	L 33–36 ^{OT}	26,187	
October 24	at Hawaii	Aloha Stadium; Honolulu, HI	W 30–20	25,234	
October 31	Fresno State	University Stadium; Albuquerque, NM	L 20–28	21,027	
November 7	at BYU	Cougar Stadium; Provo, UT	L 21–46		
November 14	Utah	University Stadium; Albuquerque, NM	L 7–41	22,281	
November 21	at UCF*	Florida Citrus Bowl; Orlando, FL	L 6–38	19,025	
*Non-conference game; ^{†}Homecoming

== Roster ==
1998 New Mexico Lobos football team roster
Players
Coaches
Offense

Pos.	#	Name	Class
RB	33	Holmon Wiggins	Fr

Defense

Pos.	#	Name	Class
SS, P	10	Danny Gonzales	Sr
LB	44	Brian Urlacher	Jr

Special teams

Pos.	#	Name	Class

Head coach

- Rocky Long

Coordinators/assistant coaches

- Jim Fenwick
  (Offensive coordinator)

Legend

- (C) Team captain
- (S) Suspended
- (I) Ineligible
- Injured
- Redshirt

Roster
Last update: 1999-05-03
