= 1998 Fresno State Bulldogs football team =

American college football season

1998 Fresno State Bulldogs football
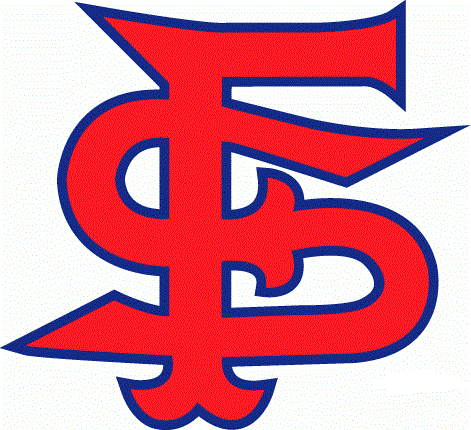
- Conference: Western Athletic Conference
- Pacific Division
- Record: 5–6 (5–3 WAC)
- Head coach: Pat Hill (2nd season)
- Offensive coordinator: Andy Ludwig (1st season)
- Offensive scheme: Spread
- Defensive coordinator: Kevin Coyle (2nd season)
- Base defense: 4–3
- Home stadium: Bulldog Stadium

1998 Western Athletic Conference football standings
	Conf.			Overall
Team	W		L	W		L
Mountain Division
No. 13 Air Force x$	7	–	1	12	–	1
Wyoming	6	–	2	8	–	3
Colorado State	5	–	3	8	–	4
Rice	5	–	3	5	–	6
TCU	4	–	4	7	–	5
Tulsa	2	–	6	4	–	7
SMU	1	–	1	0	–	1
UNLV	0	–	8	0	–	11
Pacific Division
BYU xy	7	–	1	9	–	5
San Diego State x	7	–	1	7	–	5
Utah	5	–	3	7	–	4
Fresno State	5	–	3	5	–	6
San Jose State	3	–	5	4	–	8
UTEP	3	–	5	3	–	8
New Mexico	1	–	7	3	–	9
Hawaii	0	–	8	0	–	12
Championship: Air Force 20, BYU 13
$ – Conference champion; x – Division champion/co-champions; y – Championship game participant; Rankings from AP Poll

The 1998 Fresno State Bulldogs football team represented California State University, Fresno as a member of the Pacific Division of the Western Athletic Conference (WAC) during the 1998 NCAA Division I-A football season. Led by second-year head coach Pat Hill, Fresno State compiled an overall record of 5–6 with a mark of 5–3 in conference play, tying for third place in the WAC's Pacific Division. Jaime Kimbrough was named the WAC offensive player of the year. The Bulldogs played their home games at Bulldog Stadium in Fresno, California.

== Schedule ==
Date	Time	Opponent	Site	TV	Result	Attendance
September 12	12:00 pm	at No. 16 Colorado*	Folsom Field; Boulder, CO		L 21–29	42,623
September 19	4:00 pm	at Texas Tech*	Jones Stadium; Lubbock, TX		L 28–34	40,035
September 26	7:00 pm	Nevada*	Bulldog Stadium; Fresno, CA		L 24–27	39,477
October 3	7:00 pm	BYU	Bulldog Stadium; Fresno, CA		W 31–21	38,326
October 10	4:00 pm	at TCU	Amon G. Carter Stadium; Fort Worth, TX		L 10–21	28,013
October 17	12:00 pm	at Utah	Rice-Eccles Stadium; Salt Lake City, UT		L 16–24	33,065
October 24	7:00 pm	UTEP	Bulldog Stadium; Fresno, CA		W 32–6	39,881
October 31	12:00 pm	at New Mexico	University Stadium; Albuquerque, NM		W 28–20	21,027
November 7	4:00 pm	at San Diego State	Qualcomm Stadium; San Diego, CA (rivalry)	ABC	L 0–10	22,497
November 14	1:00 pm	Hawaii	Bulldog Stadium; Fresno, CA (rivalry)		W 51–12	33,535
November 21	1:00 pm	San Jose State	Bulldog Stadium; Fresno, CA (rivalry)		W 24–21	34,292
*Non-conference game; Rankings from AP Poll released prior to the game; All times are in Pacific time

== Team players in the NFL ==
The following were selected in the 1999 NFL draft.

Player	Position	Round	Overall	NFL team
Cory Hall	Defensive back	3	65	Cincinnati Bengals

The following finished their college career in 1998, were not drafted, but played in the NFL.

Player	Position	First NFL team
Bobby Brooks	Linebacker	1999 Oakland Raiders

Notable Pro's: Jaime Kimbrough (running back) played three professional seasons in the Austrian Football League where he led the league in touchdowns scored in 2001.
