= 1998 Michigan State Spartans football team =

American college football season

1998 Michigan State Spartans football
- Conference: Big Ten Conference
- Record: 6–6 (4–4 Big Ten)
- Head coach: Nick Saban (4th season)
- Offensive coordinator: Gary Tranquill (4th season)
- Offensive scheme: Pro set
- Defensive coordinator: Chris Cosh (1st season)
- Base defense: 4–3
- Captains: Garett Gould; Sedrick Irvin; Jason Strayhorn; Amp Campbell; Sorie Kanu; Courtney Ledyard
- Home stadium: Spartan Stadium

1998 Big Ten Conference football standings
	Conf.			Overall
Team	W		L	W		L
No. 2 Ohio State %+	7	–	1	11	–	1
No. 6 Wisconsin $+	7	–	1	11	–	1
No. 12 Michigan +	7	–	1	10	–	3
No. 24 Purdue	6	–	2	9	–	4
No. 17 Penn State	5	–	3	9	–	3
Michigan State	4	–	4	6	–	6
Minnesota	2	–	6	5	–	6
Indiana	2	–	6	4	–	7
Illinois	2	–	6	3	–	8
Iowa	2	–	6	3	–	8
Northwestern	0	–	8	3	–	9
$ – BCS representative as conference champion; % – BCS at-large representative; + – Conference co-champions; Rankings from AP Poll

The 1998 Michigan State Spartans football team represented Michigan State University as a member of the Big Ten Conference during the 1998 NCAA Division I-A football season. Led by fourth-year head coach Nick Saban, the Spartans compiled an overall record of 6–6 with a mark of 4–4 in conference play, placing sixth in the Big Ten. Michigan State team did not play a bowl game following the 1998 regular season. The team played home games at Spartan Stadium in East Lansing, Michigan.

== Schedule ==
Date	Time	Opponent	Rank	Site	TV	Result	Attendance	Source
August 29	4:00 p.m.	No. 15 Colorado State*	No. 23	Spartan Stadium; East Lansing, MI (BCA Classic)	ESPN2	L 16–23	68,624	
September 5	3:30 p.m.	at Oregon*	No. 23	Autzen Stadium; Eugene, OR	ABC	L 14–48	43,634	
September 12	8:00 p.m.	No. 10 Notre Dame*		Spartan Stadium; East Lansing, MI (rivalry)	ABC	W 45–23	74,267	
September 26	12:00 p.m.	at Michigan		Michigan Stadium; Ann Arbor, MI (rivalry)	ABC	L 17–29	111,238	
October 3	1:00 p.m.	Central Michigan*		Spartan Stadium; East Lansing, MI		W 38–7	70,905	
October 10	12:00 p.m.	Indiana^{†}		Spartan Stadium; East Lansing, MI (rivalry)	ESPN	W 38–31 ^{2OT}	73,425	
October 24	12:00 p.m.	at Minnesota		Hubert H. Humphrey Metrodome; Minneapolis, MN	ESPN Plus	L 18–19	41,327	
October 31	12:00 p.m.	Northwestern		Spartan Stadium; East Lansing, MI	ESPN2	W 29–5	67,473	
November 7	3:30 p.m.	at No. 1 Ohio State		Ohio Stadium; Columbus, OH	ABC	W 28–24	93,595	
November 14	12:00 p.m.	Purdue		Spartan Stadium; East Lansing, MI	ESPN Plus	L 24–25	69,010	
November 21	1:00 p.m.	Illinois		Spartan Stadium; East Lansing, MI		W 41–9	67,285	
November 28	1:00 p.m.	at No. 23 Penn State		Beaver Stadium; University Park, PA (rivalry)	ABC	L 28–51	96,358	
*Non-conference game; ^{†}Homecoming; Rankings from AP Poll released prior to the game; All times are in Eastern time

== Rankings ==
Ranking movements Legend: ██ Increase in ranking ██ Decrease in ranking — = Not ranked
	Week															
Poll	Pre	1	2	3	4	5	6	7	8	9	10	11	12	13	14	Final
AP	23	—	—	—	—	—	—	—	—	—	—	—	—	—	—	—
Coaches	23	—	—	—	—	—	—	—	—	—	—	—	—	—	—	—
BCS	Not released								—	—	—	—	—	—	—	Not released

== Roster ==
1998 Michigan State Spartans football team roster
Players
Coaches
Offense

Pos.	#	Name	Class
WR	4	Plaxico Burress	So
QB	16	Bill Burke	Jr
RB	33	Sedrick Irvin	Jr
OT	74	Tupe Peko	So
OT	76	Greg Randall	Jr
C	77	Josh Smith	Fr
TE	83	Chris Baker	Fr
WR	86	Gari Scott	So

Defense

Pos.	#	Name	Class
DB	9	Aric Morris	Jr
CB	15	Renaldo Hill	So
CB	29	Lemar Marshall	Sr
SS	43	Scott Ernsberger	Sr
LB	35	T. J. Turner	So
LB	50	Josh Thornhill	Fr
LB	53	Courtney Ledyard	Sr
DT	62	Robert Newkirk	Jr
DE	91	Robaire Smith	Jr
DT	95	Josh Shaw	Fr
LB	96	Chad Bisseger	Jr
DE	97	Nick Myers	Fr
LB	98	Julian Peterson	Jr
DT	99	Dimitrius Underwood	Sr

Special teams

Pos.	#	Name	Class
K	1	Paul Edinger	Jr
P	12	Craig Jarrett	Fr

Head coach

- Nick Saban

Coordinators/assistant coaches

- Gary Tranquill (offensive coordinator, quarterbacks coach)
- Bobby Williams (running backs coach)
- Charlie Baggett (wide receivers coach)
- Mike Cummings (tight ends coach, special teams coordinator)
- Pat Ruel (offensive line coach)
- Chris Cosh (defensive coordinator)
- Todd Grantham (defensive line coach)
- Bill Sheridan (linebackers coach)
- Mark Dantonio (defensive backs coach)
- Brian Daboll (graduate assistant)
- Fred Farrier (graduate assistant)

Legend

- (C) Team captain
- (S) Suspended
- (I) Ineligible
- Injured
- Redshirt

Roster

== 1999 NFL draft ==
The following players were selected in the 1999 NFL draft.

Player	Round	Pick	Position	NFL team
Dimitrius Underwood	1	29	Defensive End	Minnesota Vikings
Sedrick Irvin	4	103	Running Back	Detroit Lions
