= 1998 Hawaii Rainbow Warriors football team =

American college football season

1998 Hawaii Rainbow Warriors football
- Conference: Western Athletic Conference
- Record: 0–12 (0–8 WAC)
- Head coach: Fred von Appen (3rd season)
- Offensive coordinator: Don Lindsey (1st season)
- Offensive scheme: Multiple
- Defensive coordinator: Tom Williams (1st season)
- Base defense: 4–3
- Home stadium: Aloha Stadium

1998 Western Athletic Conference football standings
	Conf.			Overall
Team	W		L	W		L
Mountain Division
No. 13 Air Force x$	7	–	1	12	–	1
Wyoming	6	–	2	8	–	3
Colorado State	5	–	3	8	–	4
Rice	5	–	3	5	–	6
TCU	4	–	4	7	–	5
Tulsa	2	–	6	4	–	7
SMU	1	–	1	0	–	1
UNLV	0	–	8	0	–	11
Pacific Division
BYU xy	7	–	1	9	–	5
San Diego State x	7	–	1	7	–	5
Utah	5	–	3	7	–	4
Fresno State	5	–	3	5	–	6
San Jose State	3	–	5	4	–	8
UTEP	3	–	5	3	–	8
New Mexico	1	–	7	3	–	9
Hawaii	0	–	8	0	–	12
Championship: Air Force 20, BYU 13
$ – Conference champion; x – Division champion/co-champions; y – Championship game participant; Rankings from AP Poll

The 1998 Hawaii Rainbow Warriors football team represented the University of Hawaiʻi at Mānoa in the Western Athletic Conference during the 1998 NCAA Division I-A football season. In their third season under head coach Fred von Appen, the Rainbow Warriors compiled a 0–12 record.

== Schedule ==
Date	Opponent	Site	Result	Attendance
September 3	No. 24 Arizona*	Aloha Stadium; Halawa, HI	L 6–27	38,745
September 19	at Utah	Rice–Eccles Stadium; Salt Lake City, UT	L 21–30	37,699
September 26	Arkansas State*	Aloha Stadium; Halawa, HI	L 0–20	28,159
October 3	SMU*	Aloha Stadium; Halawa, HI	L 0–28	25,912
October 9	at San Diego State	Qualcomm Stadium; San Diego, CA	L 13–35	20,320
October 17	BYU	Aloha Stadium; Halawa, HI	L 9–31	29,944
October 24	New Mexico	Aloha Stadium; Halawa, HI	L 20–30	25,234
October 31	at UTEP	Sun Bowl; El Paso, TX	L 13–30	15,207
November 7	San Jose State^{†}	Aloha Stadium; Halawa, HI (rivalry)	L 17–45	26,716
November 14	at Fresno State	Bulldog Stadium; Fresno, CA (rivalry)	L 12–51	33,505
November 21	Northwestern*	Aloha Stadium; Halawa, HI	L 21–47	25,918
November 28	No. 15 Michigan*	Aloha Stadium; Halawa, HI	L 17–48	34,193
*Non-conference game; ^{†}Homecoming; Rankings from AP Poll released prior to the game
