= 1998 UTEP Miners football team =

American college football season

1998 UTEP Miners football
- Conference: Western Athletic Conference
- Pacific Division
- Record: 3–8 (3–5 WAC)
- Head coach: Charlie Bailey (6th season)
- Offensive coordinator: Gary Nord (2nd season)
- Defensive coordinator: Ronnie Jones (3rd season)
- Home stadium: Sun Bowl

1998 Western Athletic Conference football standings
	Conf.			Overall
Team	W		L	W		L
Mountain Division
No. 13 Air Force x$	7	–	1	12	–	1
Wyoming	6	–	2	8	–	3
Colorado State	5	–	3	8	–	4
Rice	5	–	3	5	–	6
TCU	4	–	4	7	–	5
Tulsa	2	–	6	4	–	7
SMU	1	–	1	0	–	1
UNLV	0	–	8	0	–	11
Pacific Division
BYU xy	7	–	1	9	–	5
San Diego State x	7	–	1	7	–	5
Utah	5	–	3	7	–	4
Fresno State	5	–	3	5	–	6
San Jose State	3	–	5	4	–	8
UTEP	3	–	5	3	–	8
New Mexico	1	–	7	3	–	9
Hawaii	0	–	8	0	–	12
Championship: Air Force 20, BYU 13
$ – Conference champion; x – Division champion/co-champions; y – Championship game participant; Rankings from AP Poll

The 1998 UTEP Miners football team was an American football team that represented the University of Texas at El Paso in the Western Athletic Conference during the 1998 NCAA Division I-A football season. In their sixth year under head coach Charlie Bailey, the team compiled a 3–8 record.

== Schedule ==
Date	Opponent	Site	Result	Attendance
September 5	at Texas Tech*	Jones Stadium; Lubbock, TX	L 3–35	41,087
September 12	No. 24 Oregon*	Sun Bowl; El Paso, TX	L 26–33	25,906
September 19	at New Mexico State*	Aggie Memorial Stadium; Las Cruces, NM (rivalry)	L 24–33	32,993
October 3	Colorado State	Sun Bowl; El Paso, TX	L 17–20	19,003
October 10	at New Mexico	University Stadium; Albuquerque, NM	W 22–19	29,812
October 17	San Jose State^{†}	Sun Bowl; El Paso, TX	W 28–21	21,300
October 24	at Fresno State	Bulldog Stadium; Fresno, CA	L 6–32	39,881
October 31	Hawaii	Sun Bowl; El Paso, TX	W 30–13	15,207
November 7	at Utah	Rice–Eccles Stadium; Salt Lake City, UT	L 27–34	37,812
November 14	BYU	Sun Bowl; El Paso, TX	L 14–31	19,307
November 21	at San Diego State	Qualcomm Stadium; San Diego, CA	L 29–34	22,365
*Non-conference game; ^{†}Homecoming; Rankings from AP Poll released prior to the game
