= 1998 Rice Owls football team =

American college football season

1998 Rice Owls football
- Conference: Western Athletic Conference
- Mountain Division
- Record: 5–6 (5–3 WAC)
- Head coach: Ken Hatfield (5th season)
- Offensive coordinator: David Lee (5th season)
- Defensive coordinator: Roger Hinshaw (1st season)
- Home stadium: Rice Stadium

1998 Western Athletic Conference football standings
	Conf.			Overall
Team	W		L	W		L
Mountain Division
No. 13 Air Force x$	7	–	1	12	–	1
Wyoming	6	–	2	8	–	3
Colorado State	5	–	3	8	–	4
Rice	5	–	3	5	–	6
TCU	4	–	4	7	–	5
Tulsa	2	–	6	4	–	7
SMU	1	–	1	0	–	1
UNLV	0	–	8	0	–	11
Pacific Division
BYU xy	7	–	1	9	–	5
San Diego State x	7	–	1	7	–	5
Utah	5	–	3	7	–	4
Fresno State	5	–	3	5	–	6
San Jose State	3	–	5	4	–	8
UTEP	3	–	5	3	–	8
New Mexico	1	–	7	3	–	9
Hawaii	0	–	8	0	–	12
Championship: Air Force 20, BYU 13
$ – Conference champion; x – Division champion/co-champions; y – Championship game participant; Rankings from AP Poll

The 1998 Rice Owls football team represented Rice University as a member of the Mountain Division in the Western Athletic Conference (WAC) during the 1998 NCAA Division I-A football season. In their fifth year under head coach Ken Hatfield, the Owls compiled an overall record of 5–6 record with a mark of 5–3 in conference play, tying for third place in the WAC's Mountain Division. The team played home games at Rice Stadium in Houston.

== Schedule ==
Date	Opponent	Site	Result	Attendance
September 5	SMU	Rice Stadium; Houston, TX (rivalry)	W 23–17 ^{OT}	42,674
September 12	at Purdue*	Ross–Ade Stadium; West Lafayette, IN	L 19–21	42,563
September 19	Northwestern*	Rice Stadium; Houston, TX	L 14–23	16,271
September 26	at Texas*	Darrell K Royal–Texas Memorial Stadium; Austin, TX (rivalry)	L 21–59	71,486
October 10	at San Jose State	Spartan Stadium; San Jose, CA	L 17–20	13,668
October 17	Tulsa	Rice Stadium; Houston, TX	W 14–10	18,116
October 24	at Wyoming	War Memorial Stadium; Laramie, WY	L 24–34	16,134
October 31	Colorado State	Rice Stadium; Houston, TX	W 35–24	18,344
November 7	at TCU	Amon G. Carter Stadium; Fort Worth, TX	W 14–12	21,111
November 14	UNLV	Rice Stadium; Houston, TX	W 38–16	15,168
November 21	at No. 20 Air Force	Falcon Stadium; Colorado Springs, CO	L 16–22	47,647
*Non-conference game; Rankings from AP Poll released prior to the game
