= 1998 UNLV Rebels football team =

American college football season

1998 UNLV Rebels football
- Conference: Western Athletic Conference
- Mountain Division
- Record: 0–11 (0–8 WAC)
- Head coach: Jeff Horton (5th season)
- Offensive coordinator: Al "Buzz" Preston (1st season)
- Defensive coordinator: Ruffin McNeill (2nd season)
- Home stadium: Sam Boyd Stadium

1998 Western Athletic Conference football standings
	Conf.			Overall
Team	W		L	W		L
Mountain Division
No. 13 Air Force x$	7	–	1	12	–	1
Wyoming	6	–	2	8	–	3
Colorado State	5	–	3	8	–	4
Rice	5	–	3	5	–	6
TCU	4	–	4	7	–	5
Tulsa	2	–	6	4	–	7
SMU	1	–	1	0	–	1
UNLV	0	–	8	0	–	11
Pacific Division
BYU xy	7	–	1	9	–	5
San Diego State x	7	–	1	7	–	5
Utah	5	–	3	7	–	4
Fresno State	5	–	3	5	–	6
San Jose State	3	–	5	4	–	8
UTEP	3	–	5	3	–	8
New Mexico	1	–	7	3	–	9
Hawaii	0	–	8	0	–	12
Championship: Air Force 20, BYU 13
$ – Conference champion; x – Division champion/co-champions; y – Championship game participant; Rankings from AP Poll

The 1998 UNLV Rebels football team was an American football team that represented the University of Nevada, Las Vegas (UNLV) as a member of the Western Athletic Conference (WAC) during the 1998 NCAA Division I-A football season. In their fifth and final year under head coach Jeff Horton, the Rebels compiled an overall record of 0–11 record with mark of 0–8 in conference play, placing last out of eight teams in the WAC's Mountain Division. The team played home games at Sam Boyd Stadium in Whitney, Nevada.

== Schedule ==
Date	Opponent	Site	Result	Attendance
September 5	at Northwestern*	Ryan Field; Evanston, IL	L 7–41	30,197
September 12	Air Force	Sam Boyd Stadium; Whitney, NV	L 10–52	20,279
September 19	at No. 14 Wisconsin*	Camp Randall Stadium; Madison, WI	L 7–52	75,044
September 26	at Colorado State	Hughes Stadium; Fort Collins, CO	L 16–38	27,632
October 3	Nevada*	Sam Boyd Stadium; Whitney, NV (Fremont Cannon)	L 20–31	22,006
October 10	at BYU	Cougar Stadium; Provo, UT	L 14–38	61,774
October 17	Wyoming	Sam Boyd Stadium; Whitney, NV	L 25–28 ^{OT}	17,089
October 24	at SMU	Cotton Bowl; Dallas, TX	L 7–10	16,073
October 31	Tulsa	Sam Boyd Stadium; Whitney, NV	L 16–20	15,187
November 14	at Rice	Rice Stadium; Houston, TX	L 16–38	15,168
November 21	TCU	Sam Boyd Stadium; Whitney, NV	L 18–41	15,441
*Non-conference game; Rankings from AP Poll released prior to the game
