= 1998 Colorado State Rams football team =

American college football season

1998 Colorado State Rams football
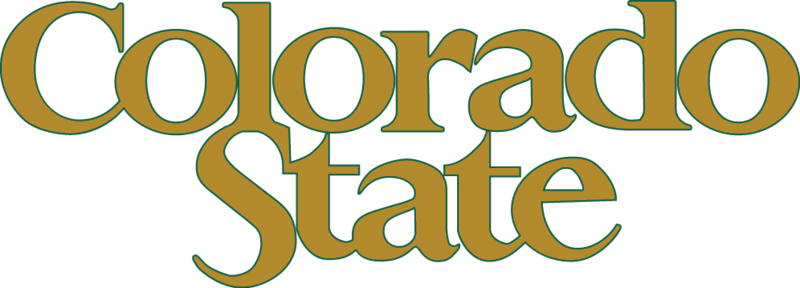
- Conference: Western Athletic Conference
- Mountain Division
- Record: 8–4 (5–3 WAC)
- Head coach: Sonny Lubick (6th season)
- Offensive coordinator: Steve Fairchild (2nd season)
- Defensive coordinator: Larry Kerr (6th season)
- Home stadium: Hughes Stadium

1998 Western Athletic Conference football standings
	Conf.			Overall
Team	W		L	W		L
Mountain Division
No. 13 Air Force x$	7	–	1	12	–	1
Wyoming	6	–	2	8	–	3
Colorado State	5	–	3	8	–	4
Rice	5	–	3	5	–	6
TCU	4	–	4	7	–	5
Tulsa	2	–	6	4	–	7
SMU	1	–	1	0	–	1
UNLV	0	–	8	0	–	11
Pacific Division
BYU xy	7	–	1	9	–	5
San Diego State x	7	–	1	7	–	5
Utah	5	–	3	7	–	4
Fresno State	5	–	3	5	–	6
San Jose State	3	–	5	4	–	8
UTEP	3	–	5	3	–	8
New Mexico	1	–	7	3	–	9
Hawaii	0	–	8	0	–	12
Championship: Air Force 20, BYU 13
$ – Conference champion; x – Division champion/co-champions; y – Championship game participant; Rankings from AP Poll

The 1998 Colorado State Rams football team represented Colorado State University as a member of the Mountain Division of the Western Athletic Conference (WAC) during 1998 NCAA Division I-A football season. Led by sixth-year head coach Sonny Lubick, the Rams compiled an overall record of 8–4 with a mark of 5–3 in conference play, placing third in the WAC's Mountain Division. The team played home games at Hughes Stadium in Fort Collins, Colorado. This season was Colorado State's last in the WAC before joining the newly formed Mountain West Conference in 1999.

== Schedule ==
Date	Opponent	Rank	Site	Result	Attendance
August 29	at No. 23 Michigan State*	No. 15	Spartan Stadium; East Lansing, MI (BCA Classic)	W 23–16	68,624
September 5	vs. Colorado*	No. 15	Mile High Stadium; Denver, CO (Rocky Mountain Showdown)	L 14–42	76,036
September 12	at Nevada*		Mackay Stadium; Reno, NV	W 26–14	22,882
September 17	at Air Force		Falcon Stadium; Colorado Springs, CO (rivalry)	L 27–30	50,115
September 26	UNLV		Hughes Stadium; Fort Collins, CO	W 38–16	27,632
October 3	at UTEP		Sun Bowl; El Paso, TX	W 20–17	19,003
October 10	Tulsa		Hughes Stadium; Fort Collins, CO	W 34–7	31,575
October 17	at New Mexico State*		Aggie Memorial Stadium; Las Cruces, NM	W 47–28	
October 24	TCU		Hughes Stadium; Fort Collins, CO	W 42–21	31,640
October 31	at Rice		Rice Stadium; Houston, TX	L 23–35	18,344
November 7	Wyoming		Hughes Stadium; Fort Collins, CO (Border War)	L 19–27	
November 14	at SMU		Cotton Bowl; Dallas, TX	W 32–10	21,133
*Non-conference game; Rankings from AP Poll released prior to the game

== Rankings ==
Ranking movements Legend: ██ Increase in ranking ██ Decrease in ranking — = Not ranked
	Week															
Poll	Pre	1	2	3	4	5	6	7	8	9	10	11	12	13	14	Final
AP	15	—	—	—	—	—	—	—	—	—	—	—	—	—	—	—
Coaches Poll	16	—	—	—	—	—	—	—	—	—	—	—	—	—	—	—
BCS	Not released								—	—	—	—	—	—	—	Not released

== Roster ==
1998 Colorado State Rams football team roster
Players
Coaches
Offense

Pos.	#	Name	Class
TE	81	Matt Fuss	Fr
RB	36	Kevin McDougal	Jr
OL	64	Mike Newell	Sr
G	61	Blaine Saipaia	Jr

Defense

Pos.	#	Name	Class
DL	95	Rob Cieslinski	Jr
LB	46	Tony Colacion	Fr
DB	18	Jason Craft	Sr
LB	6	Rick Crowell	Jr
DE	44	Aaron Green	Fr
DL	96	Clark Haggans	Jr
DB	38	John Howell	Jr
DB	28	Erik Olson	Jr
DL	8	Joey Porter	Sr

Special teams

Pos.	#	Name	Class

Head coach

- Sonny Lubick

Coordinators/assistant coaches

Legend

- (C) Team captain
- (S) Suspended
- (I) Ineligible
- Injured
- Redshirt

Roster
