= 1998 Northwestern Wildcats football team =

American college football season

1998 Northwestern Wildcats football
- Conference: Big Ten Conference
- Record: 3–9 (0–8 Big Ten)
- Head coach: Gary Barnett (7th season)
- Offensive coordinator: Greg Meyer (7th season)
- Co-defensive coordinators: Jerry Brown (2nd season); Vince Okruch (2nd season)
- Captains: D'Wayne Bates; Barry Gardner; Matt Hartl; Bryan LaBelle
- Home stadium: Ryan Field

1998 Big Ten Conference football standings
	Conf.			Overall
Team	W		L	W		L
No. 2 Ohio State %+	7	–	1	11	–	1
No. 6 Wisconsin $+	7	–	1	11	–	1
No. 12 Michigan +	7	–	1	10	–	3
No. 24 Purdue	6	–	2	9	–	4
No. 17 Penn State	5	–	3	9	–	3
Michigan State	4	–	4	6	–	6
Minnesota	2	–	6	5	–	6
Indiana	2	–	6	4	–	7
Illinois	2	–	6	3	–	8
Iowa	2	–	6	3	–	8
Northwestern	0	–	8	3	–	9
$ – BCS representative as conference champion; % – BCS at-large representative; + – Conference co-champions; Rankings from AP Poll

The 1998 Northwestern Wildcats football team represented Northwestern University during the 1998 NCAA Division I-A football season. They played their home games at Ryan Field and participated as members of the Big Ten Conference. They were coached by Gary Barnett, who resigned at the conclusion of the regular season to become the head coach at Colorado.

== Schedule ==
Date	Time	Opponent	Site	TV	Result	Attendance	Source
September 5	11:30 am	UNLV*	Ryan Field; Evanston, IL		W 41–7	30,197	
September 12	11:00 am	Duke*	Ryan Field; Evanston, IL	ESPN Plus	L 10–44	40,178	
September 19	7:00 pm	at Rice*	Rice Stadium; Houston, TX		W 23–14	16,271	
September 26	11:00 am	at No. 14 Wisconsin	Camp Randall Stadium; Madison, WI	ESPN	L 7–38	78,337	
October 3	11:00 am	Illinois	Ryan Field; Evanston, IL (rivalry)	ESPN Plus	L 10–13	41,232	
October 10	11:00 am	at Iowa	Kinnick Stadium; Iowa City, IA	ESPN2	L 24–26	70,397	
October 17	6:00 pm	Michigan	Ryan Field; Evanston, IL (rivalry)	ESPN	L 6–12	47,129	
October 24	11:00 am	No. 1 Ohio State	Ryan Field; Evanston, IL	ESPN2	L 10–36	47,130	
October 31	11:00 am	at Michigan State	Spartan Stadium; East Lansing, MI	ESPN2	L 5–29	67,473	
November 7	11:00 am	Purdue	Ryan Field; Evanston, IL	ESPN Plus	L 21–56	39,575	
November 14	11:00 am	at No. 19 Penn State	Beaver Stadium; University Park, PA	ESPN2	L 10–41	96,382	
November 21	10:00 pm	at Hawaii*	Aloha Stadium; Halawa, HI		W 47–21	25,918	
*Non-conference game; Rankings from AP Poll released prior to the game; All times are in Central time

== Roster ==
1998 Northwestern Wildcats football team roster
Players
Coaches
Offense

Pos.	#	Name	Class
WR	5	D'Wayne Bates	Sr
RB	20	Damien Anderson	Fr
RB	27	Sean Bennett	Sr
RB	28	Brian Marshall	So
TE	84	Jay Tant	Jr

Defense

Pos.	#	Name	Class
LB	2	Kevin Bentley	Fr
CB	6	Harold Blackmon	So
LB	8	Napoleon Harris	Fr
LB	55	Barry Gardner	Sr
DT	92	Javiar Collins	So
DE	95	Dwayne Missouri	So

Special teams

Pos.	#	Name	Class
K	13	Brian Gowins	Sr

Head coach

- Gary Barnett

Coordinators/assistant coaches

Legend

- (C) Team captain
- (S) Suspended
- (I) Ineligible
- Injured
- Redshirt

Roster
