= 1998 Utah Utes football team =

American college football season

1998 Utah Utes football
- Conference: Western Athletic Conference
- Pacific Division
- Record: 7–4 (5–3 WAC)
- Head coach: Ron McBride (9th season)
- Offensive coordinator: Tommy Lee (1st season)
- Offensive scheme: Pro-style
- Defensive coordinator: Kyle Whittingham (4th season)
- Base defense: 4–3
- Home stadium: Rice–Eccles Stadium

1998 Western Athletic Conference football standings
	Conf.			Overall
Team	W		L	W		L
Mountain Division
No. 13 Air Force x$	7	–	1	12	–	1
Wyoming	6	–	2	8	–	3
Colorado State	5	–	3	8	–	4
Rice	5	–	3	5	–	6
TCU	4	–	4	7	–	5
Tulsa	2	–	6	4	–	7
SMU	1	–	1	0	–	1
UNLV	0	–	8	0	–	11
Pacific Division
BYU xy	7	–	1	9	–	5
San Diego State x	7	–	1	7	–	5
Utah	5	–	3	7	–	4
Fresno State	5	–	3	5	–	6
San Jose State	3	–	5	4	–	8
UTEP	3	–	5	3	–	8
New Mexico	1	–	7	3	–	9
Hawaii	0	–	8	0	–	12
Championship: Air Force 20, BYU 13
$ – Conference champion; x – Division champion/co-champions; y – Championship game participant; Rankings from AP Poll

The 1998 Utah Utes football team represented the University of Utah as a member of the Pacific Division of the Western Athletic Conference (WAC) during the 1998 NCAA Division I-A football season. Led by ninth-year head coach Ron McBride, the Utes compiled an overall record of 7–5 with a mark of 5–3 in conference play, tying for third place in the WAC's Pacific Division. The team played home games at the newly-opened Rice–Eccles Stadium in Salt Lake City. This was Utah's last season in the WAC. The following year, the newly-formed Mountain West Conference began play.

== Schedule ==
Date	Time	Opponent	Site	TV	Result	Attendance
September 5	7:00 pm	at Utah State*	Romney Stadium; Logan, UT (Battle of the Brothers)	KSL	W 20–12	30,218
September 12	7:00 pm	Louisville*	Rice–Eccles Stadium; Salt Lake City, UT	KJZZ	W 45–22	44,112
September 19	7:00 pm	Hawaii	Rice–Eccles Stadium; Salt Lake City, UT		W 30–21	37,699
September 26	7:00 pm	Boise State*^{†}	Rice–Eccles Stadium; Salt Lake City, UT		L 28–31	36,037
October 3	1:00 pm	at Wyoming	War Memorial Stadium; Laramie, WY	KJZZ	L 24–27	16,349
October 17	1:00 pm	Fresno State	Rice–Eccles Stadium; Salt Lake City, UT		W 24–16	33,065
October 24	7:00 pm	at San Diego State	Qualcomm Stadium; San Diego, CA	KJZZ	L 20–21 ^{OT}	28,807
October 31	1:00 pm	at San Jose State	Spartan Stadium; San Jose, CA	KJZZ	W 49–17	12,279
November 7	1:00 p.m.	UTEP	Rice–Eccles Stadium; Salt Lake City, UT		W 34–27 ^{OT}	37,812
November 14	1:00 pm	at New Mexico	University Stadium; Albuquerque, NM	KJZZ	W 41–7	22,281
November 21	11:30 am	BYU	Rice–Eccles Stadium; Salt Lake City, UT (Holy War)	ESPN2	L 24–26	45,634
*Non-conference game; ^{†}Homecoming; All times are in Mountain time

== NFL draft ==
One player was selected in the 1999 NFL draft.

Player	Position	Round	Pick	NFL club
Phil Glover	Linebacker	7	222	Tennessee Titans
