= 1998 BYU Cougars football team =

American college football season

1998 BYU Cougars football

WAC Pacific Division co-champion

WAC Championship Game, L 13–20 vs. Air Force

Liberty Bowl, L 27–41 vs. Tulane
- Conference: Western Athletic Conference
- Pacific Division
- Record: 9–5 (7–1 WAC)
- Head coach: LaVell Edwards (27th season)
- Co-offensive coordinators: Norm Chow (3rd season); Roger French (18th season)
- Offensive scheme: Pro spread
- Defensive coordinator: Ken Schmidt (8th season)
- Base defense: 4–3
- Home stadium: Cougar Stadium

1998 Western Athletic Conference football standings
| | Conf. | | | Overall |
| Team | W | | L | W | | L |
|---|---|---|---|---|---|---|
Mountain Division
| No. 13 Air Force x$ | 7 | – | 1 | 12 | – | 1 |
| Wyoming | 6 | – | 2 | 8 | – | 3 |
| Colorado State | 5 | – | 3 | 8 | – | 4 |
| Rice | 5 | – | 3 | 5 | – | 6 |
| TCU | 4 | – | 4 | 7 | – | 5 |
| Tulsa | 2 | – | 6 | 4 | – | 7 |
| SMU | 1 | – | 1 | 0 | – | 1 |
| UNLV | 0 | – | 8 | 0 | – | 11 |
Pacific Division
| BYU xy | 7 | – | 1 | 9 | – | 5 |
| San Diego State x | 7 | – | 1 | 7 | – | 5 |
| Utah | 5 | – | 3 | 7 | – | 4 |
| Fresno State | 5 | – | 3 | 5 | – | 6 |
| San Jose State | 3 | – | 5 | 4 | – | 8 |
| UTEP | 3 | – | 5 | 3 | – | 8 |
| New Mexico | 1 | – | 7 | 3 | – | 9 |
| Hawaii | 0 | – | 8 | 0 | – | 12 |
Championship: Air Force 20, BYU 13
$ – Conference champion; x – Division champion/co-champions; y – Championship game participant; Rankings from AP Poll

The 1998 BYU Cougars football team represented Brigham Young University during the 1998 NCAA Division I-A football season. The Cougars were led by 27th-year head coach LaVell Edwards and played their home games at Cougar Stadium in Provo, Utah. The team competed as members of the Western Athletic Conference, winning a share of the Pacific Division title with a conference record of 7–1. The Cougars advanced to the 1998 WAC Championship Game over division co-champion San Diego State due to a head-to-head victory. After losing to Air Force in the conference championship game, BYU was invited to the 1998 Liberty Bowl, where they were defeated by the undefeated Tulane Green Wave. This was BYU's last season in the WAC before joining the Mountain West Conference in 1999.

== Schedule ==
| Date | Opponent | Site | TV | Result | Attendance | Source |
|---|---|---|---|---|---|---|
| September 5 | at Alabama* | Bryant–Denny Stadium; Tuscaloosa, AL | ESPN | L 31–38 | 83,818 | |
| September 12 | No. 14 Arizona State* | Cougar Stadium; Provo, UT | ESPN2 | W 26–6 | 65,096 | |
| September 19 | at No. 9 Washington* | Husky Stadium; Seattle, WA | ABC | L 10–20 | 71,297 | |
| September 26 | Murray State* | Cougar Stadium; Provo, UT | KSL | W 43–9 | | |
| October 3 | at Fresno State | Bulldog Stadium; Fresno, CA | | L 21–31 | 38,326 | |
| October 10 | UNLV | Cougar Stadium; Provo, UT | KSL | W 38–14 | 61,774 | |
| October 17 | at Hawaii | Aloha Stadium; Halawa, HI | | W 31–9 | 29,944 | |
| October 24 | San Jose State | Cougar Stadium; Provo, UT | ESPN | W 46–43 | 62,423 | |
| October 29 | San Diego State | Cougar Stadium; Provo, UT | ESPN | W 13–0 | 63,496 | |
| November 7 | New Mexico | Cougar Stadium; Provo, UT | KSL | W 46–21 | | |
| November 14 | at UTEP | Sun Bowl; El Paso, TX | | W 31–14 | 19,307 | |
| November 21 | at Utah | Rice–Eccles Stadium; Salt Lake City, UT (Holy War) | ESPN2 | W 26–24 | 45,634 | |
| December 5 | vs. No. 17 Air Force* | Sam Boyd Stadium; Las Vegas, NV (WAC Championship Game) | ABC | L 13–20 | 32,745 | |
| December 31 | vs. No. 10 Tulane* | Liberty Bowl Memorial Stadium; Memphis, TN (Liberty Bowl) | ESPN | L 27–41 | 52,197 | |
*Non-conference game; Rankings from AP Poll released prior to the game

== Roster ==
1998 BYU Cougars football team roster
Players
Coaches
Offense

| Pos. | # | Name | Class |
|---|---|---|---|
| QB | 11 | Brandon Doman | Fr |
| TE | 88 | Doug Jolley | Fr |
| QB | 7 | Kevin Feterik | Jr |
| WR | 20 | Reno Mahe | Fr |
| TE | 91 | Tevita Ofahengaue | Jr |
| OL | 75 | John Tait | Jr |
| OT | 70 | Joe Wong | Sr |

Defense

| Pos. | # | Name | Class |
|---|---|---|---|
| DE | 92 | Ryan Denney | Fr |
| LB | 55 | Justin Ena | Fr |
| DE | 93 | Byron Frisch | Jr |
| DT | 98 | Chris Hoke | So |
| DE | 93 | Brett Keisel | Fr |
| LB | 44 | Rob Morris | Jr |
| DT | 72 | Hans Olsen | So |

Special teams

| Pos. | # | Name | Class |
|---|---|---|---|
| K | 27 | Owen Pochman | So |

Head coach

- LaVell Edwards

Coordinators/assistant coaches

Legend

- (C) Team captain
- (S) Suspended
- (I) Ineligible
- Injured
- Redshirt
