= 1998 TCU Horned Frogs football team =

American college football season

1998 TCU Horned Frogs football

Sun Bowl champion

Sun Bowl, W 28–19 vs. USC
- Conference: Western Athletic Conference
- Mountain Division
- Record: 7–5 (4–4 WAC)
- Head coach: Dennis Franchione (1st season)
- Co-offensive coordinators: Mike Schultz (1st season); Dan Dodd (1st season)
- Offensive scheme: Multiple
- Defensive coordinator: Gary Patterson (1st season)
- Base defense: 4–2–5
- Home stadium: Amon G. Carter Stadium

1998 Western Athletic Conference football standings
	Conf.			Overall
Team	W		L	W		L
Mountain Division
No. 13 Air Force x$	7	–	1	12	–	1
Wyoming	6	–	2	8	–	3
Colorado State	5	–	3	8	–	4
Rice	5	–	3	5	–	6
TCU	4	–	4	7	–	5
Tulsa	2	–	6	4	–	7
SMU	1	–	1	0	–	1
UNLV	0	–	8	0	–	11
Pacific Division
BYU xy	7	–	1	9	–	5
San Diego State x	7	–	1	7	–	5
Utah	5	–	3	7	–	4
Fresno State	5	–	3	5	–	6
San Jose State	3	–	5	4	–	8
UTEP	3	–	5	3	–	8
New Mexico	1	–	7	3	–	9
Hawaii	0	–	8	0	–	12
Championship: Air Force 20, BYU 13
$ – Conference champion; x – Division champion/co-champions; y – Championship game participant; Rankings from AP Poll

The 1998 TCU Horned Frogs football team represented Texas Christian University (TCU) in the 1998 NCAA Division I-A football season. The Horned Frogs finished the season 7–5 overall and 4–4 in the Western Athletic Conference. The team was coached by Dennis Franchione. The Frogs played their home games in Amon G. Carter Stadium, which is located on campus in Fort Worth, Texas.

== Schedule ==
Date	Time	Opponent	Site	TV	Result	Attendance	Source
September 5	11:30 a.m.	at Iowa State*	Jack Trice Stadium; Ames, IA	FSN	W 31–21	33,008	
September 12	6:00 p.m.	Oklahoma*	Amon G. Carter Stadium; Fort Worth, TX		L 9–10	38,256	
September 26	6:00 p.m.	No. 23 Air Force	Amon G. Carter Stadium; Fort Worth, TX		W 35–34	26,418	
October 3	6:00 p.m.	Vanderbilt*	Amon G. Carter Stadium; Fort Worth, TX		W 19–16 ^{2OT}	26,210	
October 10	6:00 p.m.	Fresno State	Amon G. Carter Stadium; Fort Worth, TX		W 21–10	28,013	
October 17	2:00 p.m.	at SMU	Cotton Bowl; Dallas, TX (rivalry)		L 6–10	26,360	
October 24	6:00 p.m.	at Colorado State	Hughes Stadium; Fort Collins, CO		L 21–42	31,640	
October 31	8:00 pm	Wyoming	Amon G. Carter Stadium; Fort Worth, TX	ESPN2	L 27–34	23,080	
November 7	2:00 p.m.	Rice	Amon G. Carter Stadium; Fort Worth, TX		L 12–14	21,111	
November 14	2:00 pm	at Tulsa	Skelly Stadium; Tulsa, OK		W 17–7	12,628	
November 21	3:00 p.m.	at UNLV	Sam Boyd Stadium; Whitney, NV		W 41–18	15,441	
December 31	1:00 p.m.	vs. USC*	Sun Bowl; El Paso, TX (Sun Bowl)	CBS	W 28–19	46,612	
*Non-conference game; Rankings from AP Poll released prior to the game; All times are in Central time
