= 1998 SMU Mustangs football team =

American college football season

1998 SMU Mustangs football
- Conference: Western Athletic Conference
- Mountain Division
- Record: 1–1 (4 wins, 6 loses vacated) (0–1 (4 wins, 3 loses vacated) WAC)
- Head coach: Mike Cavan (2nd season)
- Offensive coordinator: Greg Briner (1st season)
- Offensive scheme: Spread option
- Defensive coordinator: Eric Schumann (2nd season)
- Base defense: 4–3
- Home stadium: Cotton Bowl

1998 Western Athletic Conference football standings
	Conf.			Overall
Team	W		L	W		L
Mountain Division
No. 13 Air Force x$	7	–	1	12	–	1
Wyoming	6	–	2	8	–	3
Colorado State	5	–	3	8	–	4
Rice	5	–	3	5	–	6
TCU	4	–	4	7	–	5
Tulsa	2	–	6	4	–	7
SMU	1	–	1	0	–	1
UNLV	0	–	8	0	–	11
Pacific Division
BYU xy	7	–	1	9	–	5
San Diego State x	7	–	1	7	–	5
Utah	5	–	3	7	–	4
Fresno State	5	–	3	5	–	6
San Jose State	3	–	5	4	–	8
UTEP	3	–	5	3	–	8
New Mexico	1	–	7	3	–	9
Hawaii	0	–	8	0	–	12
Championship: Air Force 20, BYU 13
$ – Conference champion; x – Division champion/co-champions; y – Championship game participant; Rankings from AP Poll

The 1998 Western Athletic Conference Mustangs football team represented Southern Methodist University (SMU) as a member of the Mountain Division of the Western Athletic Conference (WAC) during the 1998 NCAA Division I-A football season. Led by second-year head coach Mike Cavan, the Mustangs finished the season with an overall record of 5–7 and a mark of 4–4 in conference play, tying for fifth place in the WAC's Mountain Division. However, SMU vacated 10 games after Steve Malin was found to have been ineligible due to academic fraud. The Mustangs played their home games at the Cotton Bowl in Dallas.

== Schedule ==
Date	Time	Opponent	Site	TV	Result	Attendance	Source
September 5	7:00 p.m.	at Rice	Rice Stadium; Houston, TX (rivalry)		L 17–23 ^{OT}	42,674	
September 12	7:00 p.m.	Tulane*	Cotton Bowl; Dallas, TX		L 21–31	12,316	
September 19	6:00 p.m.	at Arkansas*	War Memorial Stadium; Little Rock, AR		L 17–44	55,544	
September 26	2:00 p.m.	Ole Miss*	Cotton Bowl; Dallas, TX		L 41–48 ^{OT}	22,281	
October 3	11:00 p.m.	at Hawaii	Aloha Stadium; Halawa, HI		W 28–0 (vacated)	25,912	
October 10	2:00 p.m.	at Wyoming	War Memorial Stadium; Laramie, WY		L 7–12	15,504	
October 17	2:00 p.m.	TCU	Cotton Bowl; Dallas, TX (rivalry)		W 10–6 (vacated)	26,360	
October 24	2:00 p.m.	UNLV	Cotton Bowl; Dallas, TX		W 10–7 (vacated)	16,073	
October 31	1:00 p.m.	at Air Force	Falcon Stadium; Air Force Academy, CO		L 7–31	30,053	
November 7	2:00 p.m.	Tulsa	Cotton Bowl; Dallas, TX		W 33–3 (vacated)	11,143	
November 14	2:00 p.m.	Colorado State^{†}	Cotton Bowl; Dallas, TX		L 10–32	21,133	
November 21	11:00 a.m.	at Navy*	Navy–Marine Corps Memorial Stadium; Annapolis, MD	KLDT	W 24–11	27,487	
*Non-conference game; ^{†}Homecoming

== Personnel ==
=== Roster ===
1998 SMU Mustangs football team roster
Players
Coaches
Offense

Pos.	#	Name	Class
C	70	Austin Adami	Sr
RB	21	Kelsey Adams	Sr
QB	15	Josh McCown	So
RB	46	Jeff Pennington	Jr

Defense

Pos.	#	Name	Class

Special teams

Pos.	#	Name	Class

Head coach

- Mike Cavan

Coordinators/assistant coaches

Legend

- (C) Team captain
- (S) Suspended
- (I) Ineligible
- Injured
- Redshirt

Name	Position	Seasons at SMU	Alma mater
Mike Cavan	Head coach	2	Georgia (1972)
Warren Belin	Linebackers, assistant recruiting coordinator	2	Wake Forest (1990)
Greg Briner	Offensive coordinator, quarterbacks	1	USC (1972)
Derek Dooley	Wide receivers, assistant recruiting coordinator	2	Virginia (1991)
Troy Douglas	Defensive backs	2	Appalachian State (1988)
Paul Etheridge	Tight ends, offensive tackles	2	Georgia (1993)
Steve Malin	Defensive line	5	East Texas State (1993)
David McKnight	Running backs	2	Georgia (1969)
Eric Schumann	Assistant head coach, defensive coordinator, secondary	2	Alabama (1977)
Randy Williams	Centers, guards, recruiting coordinator	2	Valdosta State (1991)

== After the season ==
=== NFL draft ===
Two members of the 1998 SMU squad were selected in the 1999 NFL draft. Defensive back Donald Mitchell was selected in the fourth round and 117th overall by the Tennessee Titans. Defensive back Coby Rhinehart was selected in the sixth round and 190th overall by the Arizona Cardinals.

=== Steve Malin controversy ===
Twelve years after the NCAA "death penalty" that caused the SMU football program to shut down for two years, SMU encountered another scandal. SMU notified the NCAA of possible recruiting violations in early August 1999 and subsequently suspended defensive line coach Steve Malin. On November 7, 1999, The Dallas Morning News reported that former SMU football player Corlin Donaldson alleged that Malin paid another person $100 to take Donaldson's ACT exam in 1998 so that Donaldson would be eligible to attend SMU. Although Donaldson described this account to NCAA investigators, Donaldson recanted this story under pressure from Malin to save Malin's job. Following an internal investigation, SMU fired Malin on December 8, 1999; Malin had been suspended that year since August 3 without a replacement at his position. Additionally, SMU removed one assistant coach from recruiting roles for the 2000 season, reduced a total of 8 scholarships for the 2000 and 2001 seasons, and reduced a total of 16 official campus visits for high school recruits for those seasons as well. SMU also submitted a report to the NCAA.

On December 13, 2000, the NCAA placed SMU on two years' probation and vacated ten games from SMU's 1998 season in which Donaldson played, which reduced SMU's record to 1–1 for 1998. SMU's 2005 media guide indicates that the NCAA vacated the first ten games of the 1998 season. The NCAA reported that its infractions committee "concluded that the assistant football coach [Malin] initially suggested that the prospective student-athlete [Donaldson] should participate in academic fraud, actively assisted in the initial fraudulent ACT, had actual knowledge of the fraud in the second ACT and finally, had reason to know that the prospect, after enrolling at the university and becoming a student-athlete, was ineligible to compete by reason of the academic fraud." Additionally, the NCAA also discovered rules violations regarding recruiting and tryouts dating back to 1995. The NCAA also extended SMU's self-imposed restrictions on coaches' off-campus recruiting to the 2001 season and limited official visits for high school recruits to 38 for the 2001–02 school year. Malin also was assessed a seven-year show-cause penalty.
