= 1998 NCAA Division I-A football season =

American college football season

1998 NCAA Division I-A season
- Number of teams: 112
- Preseason AP No. 1: Ohio State

Postseason
- Duration: December 19, 1998 – January 4, 1999
- Bowl games: 22
- Heisman Trophy: Texas running back Ricky Williams

Bowl Championship Series
- 1999 Fiesta Bowl
- Site: Sun Devil Stadium, Tempe, Arizona
- Champion(s): Tennessee

Division I-A football seasons
- ← 1997 1999 →

The 1998 NCAA Division I-A football season, play of college football in the United States organized by the National Collegiate Athletic Association at the Division I-A level, began in late summer 1998 and culminated with the major bowl games in early January 1999. It was the first season of the Bowl Championship Series (BCS), which saw the Tennessee Volunteers win the national championship. Tennessee defeated the Florida State Seminoles, 23–16, in the Fiesta Bowl in Tempe, Arizona, to secure the inaugural BCS National Championship.

The BCS combined elements of the old Bowl Coalition and the Bowl Alliance it replaced. The agreement existed between the Rose, Fiesta, Sugar, and Orange bowl games, with the Cotton Bowl Classic diminishing in status since the breakup of the Southwest Conference. Like the Bowl Alliance, a national championship game would rotate between the four bowls, with the top two teams facing each other. These teams were chosen based upon a BCS poll, combining the AP Poll, the Coaches Poll, and a computer component. The computer factored in things such as strength of schedule, margin of victory, and quality wins without taking into account time (in other words, a loss early in the season and a loss late in the season were on equal footing). Like the Bowl Coalition, the BCS bowls not hosting the national championship game would retain their traditional conference tie-ins.

The first run of the Bowl Championship Series was not without controversy as Kansas State finished third in the final BCS standings, but was not invited to a BCS bowl game; Texas A&M, who upset K-State in the Big 12 title game, took the league's automatic bid. Ohio State (ranked 4th) and two-loss Florida (8th) received the at-large bids instead. Also, Tulane went undefeated, but finished 10th in the BCS standings and was not invited to a BCS bowl because of their low strength of schedule.

== Rule changes ==
The following rule changes were adopted by the NCAA Rules Committee during their 1998 meeting:

- Defensive players are allowed to recover and advance backward passes. Previously the defense was only allowed to recover but not advance backward passes.
- Illegal touching of a forward pass by an ineligible receiver is a five-yard penalty from the previous spot but no loss-of-down.
- Defensive players may not rough an offensive player in position to receive a backward pass (i.e. trail man on option play).
- Standardized uniform recognition regarding memorializing of deceased or severely ill teammates/coaches.
- Eyeshields must be clear.
- The titles of side judge and field judge were swapped, with the field judge now working on the same side of the field as the line judge (and ruling on placements with the back judge), and the side judge on the same side as the head linesman. Coincidentally, the NFL swapped the titles of back judge and field judge to match the NCAA prior to its 1998 season.

== Conference and program changes ==
With no teams upgrading from Division I-AA, the number of Division I-A schools was fixed at 112.

- Army broke away from almost one hundred years of tradition as an independent, joining Conference USA.
- The Western Athletic Conference realigned their Divisions. Pod two and Pod three swap the Divisions

School	1997 Conference	1998 Conference
Army Cadets	I-A Independent	Conference USA

== Regular season ==
=== August–September ===
The AP voters selected Ohio State as the top-ranked team to begin the season, followed by No. 2 Florida State and No. 3 Florida. Last year’s co-champions, Nebraska and Michigan, were ranked No. 4 and No. 5 respectively.

August 29–31: No. 2 Florida State beat No. 14 Texas A&M 23–14 in the Kickoff Classic while No. 4 Nebraska defeated Louisiana Tech 56–27 in the Eddie Robinson Classic. Most other teams had not begun their schedules, so no new poll was taken until the following week.

September 5: No. 1 Ohio State won 34–17 at No. 11 West Virginia. No. 2 Florida State was idle. No. 3 Florida opened their schedule with a 49–10 victory over The Citadel, while No. 4 Nebraska beat Alabama-Birmingham 38–7. No. 5 Michigan was upset 36–20 at No. 22 Notre Dame. No. 6 Kansas State blanked Indiana State 66–0 and moved up in the next poll: No. 1 Ohio State, No. 2 Florida State, No. 3 Florida, No. 4 Nebraska, and No. 5 Kansas State.

September 12: No. 1 Ohio State shut out Toledo 49–0. No. 2 Florida State fell 24–7 at North Carolina State, just their second loss in ACC play since joining the conference in 1992. No. 3 Florida beat Northeast Louisiana 42–10, No. 4 Nebraska won 24–3 at California, No. 5 Kansas State blew out Northern Illinois 73–7, and No. 6 UCLA defeated No. 23 Texas 49–31. The next poll featured No. 1 Ohio State, No. 2 Florida, No. 3 Nebraska, No. 4 UCLA, and No. 5 Kansas State.

September 19: No. 1 Ohio State beat No. 21 Missouri 35–14. The biggest game of the weekend took place in Knoxville between No. 2 Florida and No. 6 Tennessee. The Volunteers had lost to the Gators each of the past five years, despite having Hall of Famer Peyton Manning under center in four of those games. This time they finally came away with the victory, as Florida missed a 32-yard field goal in overtime to seal a 20–17 Tennessee triumph. No. 3 Nebraska was idle, No. 4 UCLA won 42–24 at Houston, and No. 5 Kansas State defeated Texas 48–7. The next poll featured No. 1 Ohio State, No. 2 Nebraska, No. 3 UCLA, No. 4 Tennessee, and No. 5 Kansas State.

September 26: No. 1 Ohio State was idle. No. 2 Nebraska overwhelmed No. 9 Washington 55–7. No. 3 UCLA’s game against Miami was postponed due to a hurricane, a situation which would have repercussions later in the season. No. 4 Tennessee defeated Houston 42–7, and No. 5 Kansas State blew out Northeast Louisiana 62–7. The next poll featured No. 1 Ohio State, No. 2 Nebraska, No. 3 Tennessee, No. 4 UCLA, and No. 5 Kansas State.

=== October ===
October 3: No. 1 Ohio State opened conference play with a 28–9 victory over No. 7 Penn State. No. 2 Nebraska needed a fourth-quarter punt return for a touchdown and a game-ending goal line stand to get past Oklahoma State 24–17. No. 3 Tennessee won 17–9 at Auburn, No. 4 UCLA beat Washington State 49–17, and No. 5 Kansas State was idle. The next poll featured No. 1 Ohio State, No. 2 Nebraska, No. 3 UCLA, No. 4 Tennessee, and No. 5 Kansas State.

October 10: No. 1 Ohio State shut out Illinois 41–0. No. 2 Nebraska suffered their first regular-season loss to a conference opponent since 1992, falling 28–21 to No. 18 Texas A&M. No. 3 UCLA visited No. 10 Arizona for a 52–28 victory. No. 4 Tennessee also had an easy time against a highly ranked foe, beating No. 7 Georgia by a 22–3 score. After outscoring their first four opponents 249-21, No. 5 Kansas State was forced into a defensive battle against No. 14 Colorado, but the Wildcats still prevailed 16–9. No. 6 Florida beat No. 11 LSU 22–10 to move back into the top five: No. 1 Ohio State, No. 2 UCLA, No. 3 Tennessee, No. 4 Kansas State, and No. 5 Florida.

October 17: No. 1 Ohio State defeated Minnesota 45–15. No. 2 UCLA ran out to a 17-point lead against No. 11 Oregon but allowed the Ducks to come all the way back; the lead changed hands several times before the Bruins finally won 41–38 on a field goal in overtime. No. 3 Tennessee was idle, No. 4 Kansas State beat Oklahoma State 52–20, and No. 5 Florida breezed past Auburn 24–3. The top five remained the same in the next poll.

October 24: No. 1 Ohio State won 36–10 at Northwestern, No. 2 UCLA visited California for a 28–16 victory, No. 3 Tennessee beat Alabama 35–18, and No. 4 Kansas State crushed Iowa State 52–7. No. 5 Florida was idle, and No. 6 Florida State’s 34–7 win at No. 20 Georgia Tech was impressive enough to move the Seminoles ahead of their in-state rivals in the next AP Poll: No. 1 Ohio State, No. 2 UCLA, No. 3 Tennessee, No. 4 Kansas State, and No. 5 Florida State. The first-ever BCS standings were released on October 26 and featured UCLA in the top spot, followed by Ohio State in second and the next three teams in the same order as the AP Poll.

October 31: AP No. 1 Ohio State posted another dominant win, 38–7 at Indiana. BCS No. 1 UCLA trailed by 10 points in the fourth quarter against a Stanford team with a 1–6 record, but the Bruins scored two late touchdowns for a 28–24 victory. UCLA’s close shave against inferior competition caused them to drop in both the BCS and the human polls. No. 3 Tennessee won 49–14 at South Carolina and No. 4 Kansas State visited Kansas for a 54–6 triumph. No. 5 Florida State beat North Carolina 39–13, but No. 6 Florida’s 38–7 blowout of No. 11 Georgia led the voters to switch the two teams again. The AP and BCS had the same top five: No. 1 Ohio State, No. 2 Tennessee, No. 3 UCLA, No. 4 Kansas State, and No. 5 Florida.

=== November ===
November 7: No. 1 Ohio State, having won all of their previous games by at least 17 points, was heavily favored to beat Michigan State at home. The Buckeyes held a 24–9 lead in the third quarter, but the Spartans (under the direction of up-and-coming head coach Nick Saban) responded with 19 unanswered points and sealed their 28–24 victory with an interception in the end zone on Ohio State’s last drive. No. 2 Tennessee defeated Alabama-Birmingham 37–13. No. 3 UCLA had another close call, needing a last-minute touchdown to beat Oregon State 41–34. No. 4 Kansas State won 49–6 at Baylor, No. 5 Florida visited Vanderbilt for a 45–13 win, and No. 6 Florida State handled No. 12 Virginia 45–14. The AP’s top five were No. 1 Tennessee, No. 2 Kansas State, No. 3 UCLA, No. 4 Florida, and No. 5 Florida State. The BCS also had Tennessee at No. 1, but placed UCLA over KSU and Florida State above Florida. The Coaches Poll further muddied the waters by placing Tennessee and Kansas State in a tie for first.

November 14: No. 1 Tennessee trailed No. 10 Arkansas by double digits at the half, and the Razorbacks still led by four points with three minutes left. But a snap went over their punter's head for a safety, and a fumble on Arkansas' next possession enabled a Volunteers touchdown drive for a 28–24 win (the third time in three weeks that a No. 1 team played a game with that score). No. 2 Kansas State beat No. 11 Nebraska 40–30 to clinch the Big 12 North title and end the Cornhuskers' 29-game winning streak over the Wildcats, one of the longest in NCAA history. No. 3 UCLA won 36–24 at Washington, No. 4 Florida defeated South Carolina 33–14, and No. 5 Florida State visited Wake Forest for a 24–7 victory. The AP and BCS top five remained the same, but Kansas State now stood alone at No. 1 in the Coaches Poll.

November 21: No. 1 Tennessee clinched a spot in the SEC Championship Game by defeating Kentucky 59–21. No. 2 Kansas State completed an undefeated regular season with a 31–25 victory over No. 19 Missouri. No. 3 UCLA beat USC 34–17 and earned the outright Pac-10 title. No. 4 Florida fell 23–12 at No. 5 Florida State. After their crushing defeat two weeks earlier, No. 7 Ohio State found some solace in a 31–16 win over No. 11 Michigan, the team which had dealt them several upset losses in recent years. The next AP Poll featured No. 1 Tennessee, No. 2 Kansas State, No. 3 UCLA, No. 4 Florida State, and No. 5 Ohio State. The BCS standings kept their previous top four and elevated Texas A&M, champion of the Big 12 South, to fifth place.

November 28: No. 1 Tennessee put an exclamation mark on their regular season with a 41–0 shutout of Vanderbilt. No. 2 Kansas State and No. 3 UCLA were idle, and No. 4 Florida State and No. 5 Ohio State had finished their schedules. The AP and Coaches top five remained the same, but the BCS standings moved Ohio State to No. 5 when Texas A&M lost their regular season finale 26–24 at Texas.

=== December ===
December 5: Despite being ranked first in the Coaches Poll and second in the AP ratings, Kansas State was No. 3 in the BCS standings and needed a loss by one of the teams ahead of them in order to have a shot at the championship. The game between UCLA and Miami—a makeup of the hurricane-canceled contest from September—turned out to be just what the Wildcats needed: the Bruins blew a 17-point second-half lead as Edgerrin James ran for a Miami record 299 yards and led the Hurricanes to a 49–45 win. As time was running out on UCLA, Kansas State held a 17–3 lead over No. 10 Texas A&M in the second quarter of the Big 12 Championship Game, and the crowd roared at the announcement of Miami’s victory. However, the Aggies chipped away at the Wildcats’ lead and tied the score at 27 with one minute to play. Kansas State quarterback Michael Bishop completed a 55-yard Hail Mary with time running out, but the receiver was tackled just short of the goal line and the game went into overtime. The teams traded field goals until A&M’s Branndon Stewart threw a 32-yard touchdown pass to Sirr Parker that gave the Aggies a 36–33 double-overtime triumph and ended Kansas State’s dreams of an unlikely championship.

The day almost went three-for-three on upsets as No. 23 Mississippi State held a slim lead over No. 1 Tennessee in the fourth quarter of the SEC Championship Game. However, the Volunteers scored a touchdown on a long pass by Tee Martin, forced a fumble on the next play, and immediately picked up another TD on another throw by Martin. The game ended 24–14 in favor of Tennessee, and the final AP Poll of the regular season featured No. 1 Tennessee, No. 2 Florida State, No. 3 Ohio State, No. 4 Kansas State, and No. 5 Arizona. The final BCS standings were topped by Tennessee, Florida State, Kansas State, Ohio State, and UCLA in that order.

The Fiesta Bowl would feature a battle for the national championship between No. 1 Tennessee—the only undefeated team from the major conferences—and No. 2 Florida State, the highest-rated of several one-loss teams. (The Seminoles had previously defeated Miami and Texas A&M, the two teams which had just ended UCLA and Kansas State’s perfect seasons.) The Rose Bowl featured the traditional Pac-10 vs. Big Ten matchup between No. 6 UCLA and No. 9 Wisconsin. No. 3 Ohio State, who had tied the Badgers for the conference title, went to the Sugar Bowl against No. 8 Texas A&M. The final at-large BCS spot went to No. 7 Florida, who would face Big East champion No. 18 Syracuse in the Orange Bowl. Controversially, No. 4 Kansas State was left out of the BCS bowls despite their high ranking, instead being sent to play unranked Purdue in the Alamo Bowl. No. 10 Tulane was undefeated, but their light schedule eliminated them from championship consideration; the Green Wave would match up against Brigham Young in the Liberty Bowl.

== Regular-season top-10 matchups ==
Rankings reflect the AP Poll. Rankings for Week 8 and beyond will list BCS Rankings first and AP Poll second. Teams that failed to be a top-10 team for one poll or the other will be noted.

- Week 3
  - No. 6 Tennessee defeated No. 2 Florida, 20–17 ^{OT} (Neyland Stadium, Knoxville, Tennessee)
- Week 4
  - No. 2 Nebraska defeated No. 9 Washington, 55–7 (Memorial Stadium, Lincoln, Nebraska)
- Week 5
  - No. 1 Ohio State defeated No. 7 Penn State 28–9, (Ohio Stadium, Columbus, Ohio)
- Week 6
  - No. 3 UCLA defeated No. 10 Arizona 52–28, (Arizona Stadium, Tucson, Arizona)
  - No. 4 Tennessee defeated No. 7 Georgia 22–3, (Sanford Stadium, Athens, Georgia)
- Week 11
  - No. 1/1 Tennessee defeated No. 7/10 Arkansas, 28–24 (Neyland Stadium, Knoxville, Tennessee)
- Week 12
  - No. 4/5 Florida State defeated No. 5/4 Florida, 23–12 (Doak Campbell Stadium, Tallahassee, Florida)
- Week 14
  - No. 8/10 Texas A&M defeated No. 3/2 Kansas State, 36–33 ^{2OT} (1998 Big 12 Championship Game, Trans World Dome, St. Louis, Missouri)

== Conference standings ==
1998 Atlantic Coast Conference football standings
	Conf.			Overall
Team	W		L	W		L
No. 3 Florida State $+	7	–	1	11	–	2
No. 9 Georgia Tech +	7	–	1	10	–	2
No. 18 Virginia	6	–	2	9	–	3
North Carolina	5	–	3	7	–	5
NC State	5	–	3	7	–	5
Duke	2	–	6	4	–	7
Wake Forest	2	–	6	3	–	8
Clemson	1	–	7	3	–	8
Maryland	1	–	7	3	–	8
$ – BCS representative as conference champion; + – Conference co-champions; Rankings from AP Poll

1998 Big 12 Conference football standings
	Conf.			Overall
Team	W		L	W		L
North Division
No. 10 Kansas State x	8	–	0	11	–	2
No. 19 Nebraska	5	–	3	9	–	4
No. 21 Missouri	5	–	3	8	–	4
Colorado	4	–	4	8	–	4
Kansas	1	–	7	4	–	7
Iowa State	1	–	7	3	–	8
South Division
No. 11 Texas A&M x$	7	–	1	11	–	3
No. 15 Texas	6	–	2	9	–	3
Texas Tech	4	–	4	7	–	5
Oklahoma State	3	–	5	5	–	6
Oklahoma	3	–	5	5	–	6
Baylor	1	–	7	2	–	9
Championship: Texas A&M 36, Kansas State 33
$ – BCS representative as conference champion; x – Division champion/co-champions; Rankings from AP Poll

1998 Big East Conference football standings
	Conf.			Overall
Team	W		L	W		L
No. 25 Syracuse $	6	–	1	8	–	4
No. 20 Miami (FL)	5	–	2	9	–	3
No. 23 Virginia Tech	5	–	2	9	–	3
West Virginia	5	–	2	8	–	4
Boston College	3	–	4	4	–	7
Rutgers	2	–	5	5	–	6
Temple	2	–	5	2	–	9
Pittsburgh	0	–	7	2	–	9
$ – BCS representative as conference champion; Rankings from AP Poll

1998 Big Ten Conference football standings
	Conf.			Overall
Team	W		L	W		L
No. 2 Ohio State %+	7	–	1	11	–	1
No. 6 Wisconsin $+	7	–	1	11	–	1
No. 12 Michigan +	7	–	1	10	–	3
No. 24 Purdue	6	–	2	9	–	4
No. 17 Penn State	5	–	3	9	–	3
Michigan State	4	–	4	6	–	6
Minnesota	2	–	6	5	–	6
Indiana	2	–	6	4	–	7
Illinois	2	–	6	3	–	8
Iowa	2	–	6	3	–	8
Northwestern	0	–	8	3	–	9
$ – BCS representative as conference champion; % – BCS at-large representative; + – Conference co-champions; Rankings from AP Poll

1998 Big West Conference football standings
	Conf.			Overall
Team	W		L	W		L
Idaho $	4	–	1	9	–	3
Nevada	3	–	2	6	–	5
North Texas	3	–	2	3	–	8
Boise State	2	–	3	6	–	5
Utah State	2	–	3	3	–	8
New Mexico State	1	–	4	3	–	8
$ – Conference champion

1998 Conference USA football standings
	Conf.			Overall
Team	W		L	W		L
No. 7 Tulane $	6	–	0	12	–	0
Southern Miss	5	–	1	7	–	5
Louisville	4	–	2	7	–	5
East Carolina	3	–	3	6	–	5
Army	2	–	4	3	–	8
Houston	2	–	4	3	–	8
Memphis	1	–	5	2	–	9
Cincinnati	1	–	5	2	–	9
$ – Conference champion; Rankings from AP Poll

1998 Mid-American Conference football standings
	Conf.			Overall
Team	W		L	W		L
East Division
Marshall xy$	7	–	1	12	–	1
Miami (OH) x	7	–	1	10	–	1
Bowling Green	5	–	3	5	–	6
Ohio	5	–	3	5	–	6
Akron	3	–	6	4	–	7
Kent State	0	–	8	0	–	11
West Division
Toledo x	6	–	2	7	–	5
Western Michigan	5	–	3	7	–	4
Central Michigan	5	–	3	6	–	5
Eastern Michigan	3	–	6	3	–	8
Northern Illinois	2	–	6	2	–	9
Ball State	1	–	7	1	–	10
Championship: Marshall 23, Toledo 17
$ – Conference champion; x – Division champion/co-champions; y – Championship game participant

1998 Pacific-10 Conference football standings
	Conf.			Overall
Team	W		L	W		L
No. 8 UCLA $	8	–	0	10	–	2
No. 4 Arizona	7	–	1	12	–	1
Oregon	5	–	3	8	–	4
USC	5	–	3	8	–	5
Washington	4	–	4	6	–	6
Arizona State	4	–	4	5	–	6
California	3	–	5	5	–	6
Oregon State	2	–	6	5	–	6
Stanford	2	–	6	3	–	8
Washington State	0	–	8	3	–	8
$ – BCS representative as conference champion; Rankings from AP Poll

1998 Southeastern Conference football standings
	Conf.			Overall
Team	W		L	W		L
Eastern Division
No. 1 Tennessee x$#	8	–	0	13	–	0
No. 5 Florida %	7	–	1	10	–	2
No. 14 Georgia	6	–	2	9	–	3
Kentucky	4	–	4	7	–	5
Vanderbilt	1	–	7	2	–	9
South Carolina	0	–	8	1	–	10
Western Division
Mississippi State xy	6	–	2	8	–	5
No. 16 Arkansas x	6	–	2	9	–	3
Alabama	4	–	4	7	–	5
Ole Miss	3	–	5	7	–	5
LSU	2	–	6	4	–	7
Auburn	1	–	7	3	–	8
Championship: Tennessee 24, Mississippi State 14
# – BCS National Champion; $ – BCS representative as conference champion; % – BCS at-large representative; x – Division champion/co-champions; y – Championship game participant; Rankings from AP Poll

1998 Western Athletic Conference football standings
	Conf.			Overall
Team	W		L	W		L
Mountain Division
No. 13 Air Force x$	7	–	1	12	–	1
Wyoming	6	–	2	8	–	3
Colorado State	5	–	3	8	–	4
Rice	5	–	3	5	–	6
TCU	4	–	4	7	–	5
Tulsa	2	–	6	4	–	7
SMU	1	–	1	0	–	1
UNLV	0	–	8	0	–	11
Pacific Division
BYU xy	7	–	1	9	–	5
San Diego State x	7	–	1	7	–	5
Utah	5	–	3	7	–	4
Fresno State	5	–	3	5	–	6
San Jose State	3	–	5	4	–	8
UTEP	3	–	5	3	–	8
New Mexico	1	–	7	3	–	9
Hawaii	0	–	8	0	–	12
Championship: Air Force 20, BYU 13
$ – Conference champion; x – Division champion/co-champions; y – Championship game participant; Rankings from AP Poll

1998 NCAA Division I-A independents football records
	Conf.			Overall
Team	W		L	W		L
UCF		–		9	–	2
No. 22 Notre Dame		–		9	–	3
Louisiana Tech		–		6	–	6
Northeast Louisiana		–		5	–	6
UAB		–		4	–	7
Arkansas State		–		4	–	8
Navy		–		3	–	8
Southwestern Louisiana		–		2	–	9
Rankings from AP Poll

== I-AA team wins over I-A teams ==
Italics denotes I-AA teams.

Date	Visiting team	Home team	Site	Result	Attendance	Ref.
September 3	No. 5 (I-AA) Northern Iowa	Eastern Michigan	Rynearson Stadium • Ypsilanti, Michigan	13–10	12,305	
September 12	No. 14 (I-AA) Northwestern State	Southwestern Louisiana	Cajun Field • Lafayette, Louisiana	24–22		
September 12	Youngstown State	Kent State	Dix Stadium • Kent, Ohio	24–10		
September 19	Eastern Illinois	Northern Illinois	Huskie Stadium • DeKalb, Illinois	24–10	20,184	
October 3	No. 10 (I-AA) Appalachian State	Wake Forest	Groves Stadium • Winston-Salem, North Carolina	30–27 ^{OT}	26,885	
October 3	No. 13 (I-AA) William & Mary	Temple	Veterans Stadium • Philadelphia, Pennsylvania	45–38	16,281	
^{#}Rankings from AP Poll released prior to game.

== Rankings ==
The top 25 from the AP and USA Today/ESPN Coaches Polls.

=== Preseason polls ===
AP
Ranking	Team
1	Ohio State (30)
2	Florida State (22)
3	Florida (5)
4	Nebraska (4)
5	Michigan (4)
6	Kansas State (2)
7	UCLA (1)
8	Arizona State (2)
9	LSU
10	Tennessee
11	West Virginia
12	North Carolina
13	Penn State
14	Texas A&M
15	Colorado State
16	Virginia
17	Syracuse
18	Washington
19	Georgia
20	Wisconsin
21	Southern Miss
22	Notre Dame
23	Michigan State
24	Arizona
25	Auburn

USA Today/ESPN coaches
Ranking	Team
1	Ohio State (31)
2	Florida State (10)
3	Nebraska (12)
4	Florida (1)
5	Michigan (4)
6	Kansas State (1)
7	UCLA (3)
8	LSU
9	Arizona State
10	Tennessee
11	North Carolina
12	West Virginia
13	Penn State
14	Syracuse
15	Texas A&M
16	Colorado State
17	Washington
18	Georgia
19	Virginia
20	Wisconsin
21	Southern Miss
22	Auburn
23	Michigan State
24	Notre Dame
25	Arizona

=== BCS final rankings ===
Rank	Team	Conference and standing	Bowl game
1	Tennessee	SEC Champions	Fiesta Bowl (BCS National Championship)
2	Florida State	Co-ACC Champions	Fiesta Bowl (BCS National Championship)
3	Kansas State	Big 12 North Division Champions	Alamo Bowl
4	Ohio State	Co-Big Ten Champions	Sugar Bowl
5	UCLA	Pac-10 Champions	Rose Bowl
6	Texas A&M	Big 12 Champions	Sugar Bowl
7	Arizona	Pac-10 second place	Holiday Bowl
8	Florida	SEC Eastern Division second place	Orange Bowl
9	Wisconsin	Co-Big Ten Champions	Rose Bowl
10	Tulane	Conference USA Champions	Liberty Bowl
11	Nebraska	Big 12 North Division second place (tie)	Holiday Bowl
12	Virginia	ACC third place	Peach Bowl
13	Arkansas	Co-SEC Western Division Champions	Citrus Bowl
14	Georgia Tech	Co-ACC Champions	Gator Bowl
15	Syracuse	Big East Champions	Orange Bowl

=== Final polls ===
Rank	Associated Press	Coaches' Poll
1	Tennessee (70)	Tennessee (62)
2	Ohio State	Ohio State
3	Florida State	Florida State
4	Arizona	Arizona
5	Florida	Wisconsin
6	Wisconsin	Florida
7	Tulane	Tulane
8	UCLA	UCLA
9	Georgia Tech	Kansas State
10	Kansas State	Air Force
11	Texas A&M	Georgia Tech
12	Michigan	Michigan
13	Air Force	Texas A&M
14	Georgia	Georgia
15	Texas	Penn State
16	Arkansas	Texas
17	Penn State	Arkansas
18	Virginia	Virginia
19	Nebraska	Virginia Tech
20	Miami (FL)	Nebraska
21	Missouri	Miami (FL)
22	Notre Dame	Notre Dame
23	Virginia Tech	Purdue
24	Purdue	Syracuse
25	Syracuse	Missouri

== Bowl games ==
Bowl					Site
Fiesta Bowl	No. 1 Tennessee	23	No. 2 Florida State	16	Tempe, AZ
Sugar Bowl	No. 4 Ohio State	24	No. 8 Texas A&M	14	New Orleans, LA
Orange Bowl	No. 7 Florida	31	No. 18 Syracuse	10	Miami, FL
Rose Bowl	No. 9 Wisconsin	38	No. 6 UCLA	31	Pasadena, CA
Cotton Bowl Classic	No. 20 Texas	38	No. 25 Mississippi State	11	Dallas, TX
Peach Bowl	No. 19 Georgia	35	No. 13 Virginia	33	Atlanta, GA
Florida Citrus Bowl	No. 15 Michigan	45	No. 11 Arkansas	31	Orlando, FL
Outback Bowl	No. 22 Penn State	26	Kentucky	14	Tampa, FL
Gator Bowl	No. 12 Georgia Tech	35	No. 17 Notre Dame	28	Jacksonville, FL
MicronPC Bowl	No. 24 Miami (FL)	46	NC State	23	Miami, FL
Sun Bowl	TCU	28	USC	19	El Paso, TX
Alamo Bowl	Purdue	37	No. 3 Kansas State	34	San Antonio, TX
Insight.com Bowl	No. 23 Missouri	34	West Virginia	31	Tempe, AZ
Holiday Bowl	No. 5 Arizona	23	No. 14 Nebraska	20	San Diego, CA
Liberty Bowl	No. 10 Tulane	41	BYU	27	Memphis, TN
Aloha Bowl	Colorado	51	No. 21 Oregon	43	Honolulu, HI
Oahu Bowl	No. 16 Air Force	45	Washington	25	Honolulu, HI
Independence Bowl	Mississippi	35	Texas Tech	18	Shreveport, LA
Music City Bowl	Virginia Tech	38	Alabama	7	Nashville, TN
Las Vegas Bowl	North Carolina	20	San Diego State	13	Las Vegas, NV
Motor City Bowl	Marshall	48	Louisville	29	Detroit, MI
Humanitarian Bowl	Idaho	42	Southern Mississippi	35	Boise, ID

Rankings are from the AP Poll.

== Heisman Trophy voting ==
The Heisman Trophy is given to the year's most outstanding player

Player	School	Position	1st	2nd	3rd	Total
Ricky Williams	Texas	RB	714	91	31	2,355
Michael Bishop	Kansas State	QB	41	250	169	792
Cade McNown	UCLA	QB	28	217	178	696
Tim Couch	Kentucky	QB	26	153	143	527
Donovan McNabb	Syracuse	QB	13	54	85	232
Daunte Culpepper	UCF	QB	5	11	30	67
Champ Bailey	Georgia	CB	6	8	21	55
Torry Holt	NC State	WR	2	8	22	44
Joe Germaine	Ohio State	QB	2	11	15	43
Shaun King	Tulane	QB	1	11	13	38

== Other major awards ==
- Maxwell Award (College Player of the Year) - Ricky Williams, Texas
- Walter Camp Award (Back) - Ricky Williams, Texas
- Davey O'Brien Award (Quarterback) - Michael Bishop, Kansas St.
- Johnny Unitas Golden Arm Award (Senior Quarterback) - Cade McNown, UCLA
- Doak Walker Award (Running Back) - Ricky Williams, Texas
- Fred Biletnikoff Award (Wide Receiver) - Troy Edwards, Louisiana Tech
- Bronko Nagurski Trophy (Defensive Player) - Champ Bailey, Georgia
- Chuck Bednarik Award - Dat Nguyen, Texas A&M
- Dick Butkus Award (Linebacker) - Chris Claiborne, USC
- Lombardi Award (Lineman or Linebacker) - Dat Nguyen, Texas A&M
- Outland Trophy (Interior Lineman) - Kris Farris, UCLA
- Jim Thorpe Award (Defensive Back) - Antoine Winfield, Ohio St.
- Lou Groza Award (Placekicker) - Sebastian Janikowski, Florida St.
- Paul "Bear" Bryant Award - Bill Snyder, Kansas St.
- Football Writers Association of America Coach of the Year Award - Phillip Fulmer, Tennessee

== Attendances ==
#	Team	Games	Total	Average
1	Michigan	6	665,787	110,965
2	Tennessee	6	641,484	106,914
3	Penn State	6	579,190	96,532
4	Ohio State	6	561,014	93,502
5	Georgia	6	513,710	85,618
6	Florida	6	511,792	85,299
7	Alabama	7	578,693	82,670
8	Auburn	7	567,773	81,110
9	Florida State	6	482,941	80,490
10	LSU	6	481,739	80,290
11	Notre Dame	6	480,072	80,012
12	Texas	6	464,642	77,440
13	Wisconsin	6	464,570	77,428
14	Nebraska	7	533,305	76,186
15	South Carolina	6	448,463	74,744
16	UCLA	5	368,547	73,709
17	Washington	6	428,134	71,356
18	Oklahoma	5	353,885	70,777
19	Michigan State	7	490,989	70,141
20	Clemson	7	482,500	68,929
21	Iowa	6	409,981	68,330
22	BYU	6	376,210	62,702
23	Arizona State	6	368,335	61,389
24	Southern California	7	426,295	60,899
25	Texas A&M	6	349,755	58,293
26	Kentucky	6	346,422	57,737
27	Missouri	6	344,010	57,335
28	North Carolina	5	278,350	55,670
29	West Virginia	6	324,816	54,136
30	Purdue	6	318,396	53,066
31	Arkansas	6	315,597	52,600
32	Virginia Tech	6	294,267	49,045
33	California	6	292,500	48,750
34	Arizona	6	287,494	47,916
35	Syracuse	6	287,386	47,898
36	Colorado	6	279,019	46,503
37	Mississippi	6	276,551	46,092
38	Air Force	6	273,924	45,654
39	Oregon	6	265,011	44,169
40	Virginia	5	218,800	43,760
41	Texas Tech	6	259,537	43,256
42	Miami Hurricanes	6	259,209	43,202
43	Kansas State	7	295,537	42,220
44	Oklahoma State	5	208,280	41,656
45	Boston College	6	247,201	41,200
46	Pittsburgh	7	286,660	40,951
47	Northwestern	6	245,441	40,907
48	Georgia Tech	6	242,825	40,471
49	North Carolina State	6	239,645	39,941
50	Minnesota	5	199,214	39,843
51	Louisville	6	238,071	39,679
52	Illinois	6	237,539	39,590
53	Utah	6	232,880	38,813
54	Mississippi State	5	186,925	37,385
55	Fresno State	5	185,511	37,102
56	Army	5	184,641	36,928
57	Indiana	5	182,262	36,452
58	Iowa State	6	211,085	35,181
59	Stanford	6	208,656	34,776
60	Washington State	6	208,002	34,667
61	Baylor	5	168,485	33,697
62	Navy	6	199,301	33,217
63	Kansas	6	194,200	32,367
64	East Carolina	5	158,716	31,743
65	Vanderbilt	6	190,385	31,731
66	Colorado State	4	125,169	31,292
67	Hawaii	8	234,821	29,353
68	Oregon State	6	171,288	28,548
69	Maryland	5	141,736	28,347
70	Tulane	6	167,661	27,944
71	TCU	6	163,088	27,181
72	New Mexico	6	158,834	26,472
73	Marshall	7	173,516	24,788
74	Southern Miss	5	122,807	24,561
75	San Diego State	6	146,878	24,480
76	Cincinnati	6	144,808	24,135
77	Toledo	6	142,866	23,811
78	Duke	5	118,482	23,696
79	Boise State	7	165,515	23,645
80	Memphis	6	140,871	23,479
81	Rutgers	6	139,783	23,297
82	UCF	5	113,252	22,650
83	Rice	5	110,573	22,115
84	Western Michigan	5	109,334	21,867
85	Nevada	5	105,467	21,093
86	Wake Forest	6	125,600	20,933
87	Central Michigan	5	102,995	20,599
88	Ball State	4	81,683	20,421
89	New Mexico State	5	101,711	20,342
90	UTEP	5	100,723	20,145
91	Tulsa	6	116,063	19,344
92	Ohio	5	92,088	18,418
93	SMU	6	109,306	18,218
94	UAB	6	108,991	18,165
95	UNLV	5	90,002	18,000
96	Wyoming	6	107,553	17,926
97	Louisiana Tech	5	83,738	16,748
98	Houston	5	81,477	16,295
99	Northeast Louisiana	6	91,431	15,239
100	Miami RedHawks	4	60,518	15,130
101	Temple	5	75,635	15,127
102	Utah State	6	85,480	14,247
103	Idaho	4	53,156	13,289
104	Arkansas State	6	79,558	13,260
105	San Jose State	5	62,659	12,532
106	Northern Illinois	5	62,591	12,518
107	Eastern Michigan	5	60,012	12,002
108	Bowling Green	5	56,385	11,277
109	North Texas	4	40,904	10,226
110	Southwestern Louisiana	4	38,193	9,548
111	Akron	5	42,065	8,413
112	Kent	5	38,514	7,703
