= 1998 Air Force Falcons football team =

American college football season

1998 Air Force Falcons football

WAC champion WAC Mountain Division champion Oahu Bowl champion

WAC Championship Game, W 20–13 vs. BYU

Oahu Bowl, W 43–25 vs Washington
- Conference: Western Athletic Conference
- Mountain Division

Ranking
- Coaches: No. 10
- AP: No. 13
- Record: 12–1 (7–1 WAC)
- Head coach: Fisher DeBerry (15th season)
- Offensive scheme: Wishbone triple option
- Co-defensive coordinators: Richard Bell (4th season); Cal McCombs (9th season)
- Base defense: 3–4
- Captains: Blane Morgan; Jemal Singleton; Tim Curry; Jason Sanderson
- Home stadium: Falcon Stadium

1998 Western Athletic Conference football standings
	Conf.			Overall
Team	W		L	W		L
Mountain Division
No. 13 Air Force x$	7	–	1	12	–	1
Wyoming	6	–	2	8	–	3
Colorado State	5	–	3	8	–	4
Rice	5	–	3	5	–	6
TCU	4	–	4	7	–	5
Tulsa	2	–	6	4	–	7
SMU	1	–	1	0	–	1
UNLV	0	–	8	0	–	11
Pacific Division
BYU xy	7	–	1	9	–	5
San Diego State x	7	–	1	7	–	5
Utah	5	–	3	7	–	4
Fresno State	5	–	3	5	–	6
San Jose State	3	–	5	4	–	8
UTEP	3	–	5	3	–	8
New Mexico	1	–	7	3	–	9
Hawaii	0	–	8	0	–	12
Championship: Air Force 20, BYU 13
$ – Conference champion; x – Division champion/co-champions; y – Championship game participant; Rankings from AP Poll

The 1998 Air Force Falcons football team represented the United States Air Force Academy as a member of the Mountain Division of the Western Athletic Conference (WAC) during the 1998 NCAA Division I-A football season. Led by 15th-year head coach Fisher DeBerry, the Falcons compiled an overall record of 12–1 with a mark of 7–1 in conference play, winning the WAC Mountain Division title. Air Force advanced to the WAC Championship Game, where the Falcons defeated BYU to secure the conference title. The team was then invited to the Oahu Bowl, defeating Washington. Air Force played home games at Falcon Stadium in Colorado Springs, Colorado

== Schedule ==
Date	Opponent	Rank	Site	TV	Result	Attendance	Source
September 5	Wake Forest*		Falcon Stadium; Colorado Springs, CO	ESPN2	W 42–0	47,972	
September 12	at UNLV		Sam Boyd Stadium; Whitney, NV		W 52–10	20,279	
September 17	Colorado State		Falcon Stadium; Colorado Springs, CO (rivalry)		W 30–27	50,115	
September 26	at TCU	No. 23	Amon G. Carter Stadium; Fort Worth, TX		L 34–35	26,418	
October 3	New Mexico		Falcon Stadium; Colorado Springs, CO		W 56–14	43,575	
October 10	Navy*		Falcon Stadium; Colorado Springs, CO (Commander-in-Chief's Trophy)		W 49–7	54,562	
October 24	at Tulsa		Skelly Stadium; Tulsa, OK		W 42–21	21,763	
October 31	SMU		Falcon Stadium; Colorado Springs, CO		W 31–7	30,053	
November 7	at Army*	No. 25	Michie Stadium; West Point, NY		W 35–7	40,843	
November 14	at No. 25 Wyoming	No. 23	War Memorial Stadium; Laramie, WY		W 10–3	29,197	
November 21	Rice	No. 20	Falcon Stadium; Colorado Springs, CO		W 22–16	47,647	
December 5	vs. BYU*	No. 17	Sam Boyd Stadium; Whitney, NV (WAC Championship Game)	ABC	W 20–13	32,745	
December 25	vs. Washington*	No. 16	Aloha Stadium; Halawa, HI (Oahu Bowl)	ESPN	W 43–25	46,451	
*Non-conference game; Rankings from AP Poll released prior to the game

== Rankings ==
Ranking movements Legend: ██ Increase in ranking ██ Decrease in ranking — = Not ranked RV = Received votes т = Tied with team above or below
	Week															
Poll	Pre	1	2	3	4	5	6	7	8	9	10	11	12	13	14	Final
AP	—	—	RV	23T	RV	RV	RV	RV	RV	25	23	20	18	17	16	13
Coaches Poll	—	—	RV	23	RV	RV	RV	RV	23	21	20	17	14	13	13	10
BCS	Not released								—	—	—	18	16	—	—	Not released

== Roster ==
1998 Air Force Falcons football team roster
Players
Coaches
Offense
- Ben Miller

Pos.	#	Name	Class
OL		Frank Mindrup	Sr
QB	11	Blane Morgan	Sr

Defense

Pos.	#	Name	Class

Special teams

Pos.	#	Name	Class

Head coach

- Fisher DeBerry

Coordinators/assistant coaches

Legend

- (C) Team captain
- (S) Suspended
- (I) Ineligible
- Injured
- Redshirt

== Awards and honors ==
Frank Mindrup

- Third-team All-American (AFF)
- Second-team All-WAC

== NFL draft ==
The following Falcon was selected in the National Football League draft following the season.

Round	Pick	Player	Position	NFL team
7	248	Bryce Fisher	Defensive end	Buffalo Bills
