= 1998 Wyoming Cowboys football team =

American college football season

1998 Wyoming Cowboys football
- Conference: Western Athletic Conference
- Mountain Division
- Record: 8–3 (6–2 WAC)
- Head coach: Dana Dimel (2nd season)
- Co-offensive coordinators: Dave Warner (1st season); Clancy Barone (1st season)
- Defensive coordinator: Vic Koenning (2nd season)
- Home stadium: War Memorial Stadium

1998 Western Athletic Conference football standings
| | Conf. | | | Overall |
| Team | W | | L | W | | L |
|---|---|---|---|---|---|---|
Mountain Division
| No. 13 Air Force x$ | 7 | – | 1 | 12 | – | 1 |
| Wyoming | 6 | – | 2 | 8 | – | 3 |
| Colorado State | 5 | – | 3 | 8 | – | 4 |
| Rice | 5 | – | 3 | 5 | – | 6 |
| TCU | 4 | – | 4 | 7 | – | 5 |
| Tulsa | 2 | – | 6 | 4 | – | 7 |
| SMU | 1 | – | 1 | 0 | – | 1 |
| UNLV | 0 | – | 8 | 0 | – | 11 |
Pacific Division
| BYU xy | 7 | – | 1 | 9 | – | 5 |
| San Diego State x | 7 | – | 1 | 7 | – | 5 |
| Utah | 5 | – | 3 | 7 | – | 4 |
| Fresno State | 5 | – | 3 | 5 | – | 6 |
| San Jose State | 3 | – | 5 | 4 | – | 8 |
| UTEP | 3 | – | 5 | 3 | – | 8 |
| New Mexico | 1 | – | 7 | 3 | – | 9 |
| Hawaii | 0 | – | 8 | 0 | – | 12 |
Championship: Air Force 20, BYU 13
$ – Conference champion; x – Division champion/co-champions; y – Championship game participant; Rankings from AP Poll

The 1998 Wyoming Cowboys football team represented the University of Wyoming as a member of the Mountain Division of the Western Athletic Conference during the 1998 NCAA Division I-A football season. Led by second-year head coach Dana Dimel, the Cowboys compiled an overall record of 8–3 record with mark 6–2 in conference play, placing second in the WAC's Mountain Division. Despite the good record, Wyoming was not invited to a bowl game. The team played home games at War Memorial Stadium in Laramie, Wyoming.

This was Wyoming's last season in the WAC before they joined the Mountain West Conference the next year.

== Schedule ==
| Date | Opponent | Rank | Site | Result | Attendance | Source |
|---|---|---|---|---|---|---|
| September 12 | Montana State* | | War Memorial Stadium; Laramie, WY | W 17–9 | 15,445 | |
| September 19 | at No. 12 Georgia* | | Sanford Stadium; Athens, GA | L 9–16 | 86,117 | |
| September 26 | Louisiana Tech* | | War Memorial Stadium; Laramie, WY | W 31–19 | 14,924 | |
| October 3 | Utah | | War Memorial Stadium; Laramie, WY | W 27–24 | 16,349 | |
| October 10 | SMU | | War Memorial Stadium; Laramie, WY | W 12–7 | 15,504 | |
| October 17 | at UNLV | | Sam Boyd Stadium; Whitney, NV | W 28–25 ^{OT} | 17,089 | |
| October 24 | Rice | | War Memorial Stadium; Laramie, WY | W 34–24 | 16,134 | |
| October 31 | at TCU | | Amon G. Carter Stadium; Fort Worth, TX | W 34–27 | 23,080 | |
| November 7 | at Colorado State | | Hughes Stadium; Fort Collins, CO (Border War) | W 27–19 | | |
| November 14 | No. 23 Air Force | No. 25 | War Memorial Stadium; Laramie, WY | L 3–10 | 29,197 | |
| November 21 | at Tulsa | | Skelly Stadium; Tulsa, OK | L 0–35 | 12,054 | |
*Non-conference game; Rankings from AP Poll released prior to the game

== Rankings ==
Ranking movements Legend: ██ Increase in ranking ██ Decrease in ranking — = Not ranked RV = Received votes т = Tied with team above or below
| | Week | | | | | | | | | | | | | | | |
| Poll | Pre | 1 | 2 | 3 | 4 | 5 | 6 | 7 | 8 | 9 | 10 | 11 | 12 | 13 | 14 | Final |
|---|---|---|---|---|---|---|---|---|---|---|---|---|---|---|---|---|
| AP | — | — | — | — | — | RV | RV | RV | RV | RV | 25 | RV | RV | RV | RV | RV |
| Coaches | — | — | — | — | RV | RV | RV | RV | RV | RV | 25т | RV | RV | RV | RV | RV |
| BCS | Not released | | | | | | | | — | — | — | — | — | — | — | Not released |
