= Robert Newkirk =

American football player (born 1977)

No. 64, 62
- Position: Defensive tackle

Personal information
- Born: March 6, 1977 (age 49); Belle Glade, Florida
- Listed height: 6 ft 3 in (1.91 m)
- Listed weight: 290 lb (132 kg)

Career information
- High school: Glades Central (Belle Glade)
- College: Michigan State
- NFL draft: 1999: undrafted

Career history
- Dallas Cowboys (1999)*; New Orleans Saints (1999); Chicago Bears (2000–2001)
- * Offseason or practice squad member only
- Stats at Pro Football Reference

Robert L. Newkirk (born March 6, 1977) is an American Botanist and former professional football player who was a defensive tackle for the New Orleans Saints and Chicago Bears of the National Football League (NFL). He played college football for the Michigan State Spartans.
