= Mike Newell =

Mike Newell is the name of:

- Mike Newell (director) (born 1942), film director
- Mike Newell (basketball) (born 1951), American college basketball coach
- Mike Newell (footballer) (born 1965), football manager and former player
