= Wes Caswell =

American football player (born 1975)

Wes Caswell (born January 4, 1975) is a former American football wide receiver in the Arena Football League who played for the Oklahoma Wranglers. He played college football for the Tulsa Golden Hurricane.
