= Joe Jackson (linebacker, born 1976) =

American gridiron football player (born 1976)

No. 95, 16
- Position: Fullback / linebacker

Personal information
- Born: March 18, 1976 (age 50); Phoenix, Arizona, U.S.
- Listed height: 6 ft 3 in (1.91 m)
- Listed weight: 255 lb (116 kg)

Career information
- College: San Diego State (1995–1998)
- NFL draft: 1999: undrafted

Career history
- Toronto Argonauts (2001); Arizona Rattlers (2002–2004)
- Stats at ArenaFan.com

Joseph Jackson (born March 18, 1976) is an American former professional football linebacker who played for the Toronto Argonauts of the Canadian Football League (CFL) and the Arizona Rattlers of the Arena Football League (AFL). He played college football at San Diego State University

== Early life ==
Joseph Jackson was born on March 18, 1976, in Phoenix, Arizona. He was a four-year letterman for the San Diego State Aztecs of San Diego State University from 1995 to 1998.

== Professional career ==
Jackson signed with the Toronto Argonauts of the Canadian Football League on February 15, 2001. He played in seven games for the Argonauts during the 2001 season and posted 15 tackles on defense.

Jackson was signed to the practice squad of the Arizona Rattlers of the Arena Football League (AFL) on July 3, 2002. He re-signed with the Rattlers on November 21, 2002. He was placed on injured reserve on February 22, 2003, and activated from injured reserve on April 5, 2003. Overall, he recorded one solo tackle, one pass breakup, and three rushes for three yards for the Rattlers during the 2003 season. Jackson was a fullback/linebacker during his time in the AFL as the league played under ironman rules. He was placed on injured reserve again the next year on April 30, 2004. He was activated on June 5 before being placed on injured reserve for the third time on June 12, 2004. In 2004, Jackson totaled nine solo tackles, seven assisted tackles, one forced fumble, two pass breakups, one reception for no yards, and nine carries for 32 yards and one touchdown.
