= Todd Throckmorton =

American football coach (born 1965)

Current position
- Title: Offensive coordinator & offensive line coach
- Team: Missouri Western
- Conference: MIAA

Biographical details
- Born: October 31, 1965 (age 60); Sedalia, Missouri, U.S.
- Education: Missouri Western State College (1987); University of South Dakota (1989)

Playing career
- 1984–1985: Missouri Western

Coaching career (HC unless noted)
- 1986–1987: Missouri Western (SA)
- 1988–1989: South Dakota (GA)
- 1990: East Tennessee State (TE/OT)
- 1991: Missouri Western (WR)
- 1992: Missouri Western (OL)
- 1993–1995: Missouri Western (LB)
- 1996: Missouri Western (AHC/LB)
- 1997: San Jose State (ILB)
- 1998–1999: San Jose State (DC/ILB)
- 2000–2003: Fort Lewis
- 2004–2005: Missouri Western (OL)
- 2006–2008: New Mexico (TE)
- 2009: Missouri Western (TE)
- 2010–2012: Missouri Western (OL)
- 2013–2016: Missouri Western (OC/OL)
- 2017–2018: Wisconsin–Stevens Point (AHC/OL)
- 2019–2022: Southeastern Oklahoma State (OC/OL)
- 2023–present: Missouri Western (OC/OL)

Head coaching record
- Overall: 11–33

Todd Throckmorton (born October 31, 1965) is an American college football coach. He is the offensive coordinator and offensive line coach for Missouri Western State University, positions he has held since 2023. He was the head football coach for Fort Lewis College from 2000 to 2003. He also coached for South Dakota, East Tennessee State, San Jose State, New Mexico, Wisconsin–Stevens Point, and Southeastern Oklahoma State. He played college football for Missouri Western.

== Head coaching record ==
Year	Team	Overall	Conference	Standing	Bowl/playoffs
Fort Lewis Skyhawks (Rocky Mountain Athletic Conference) (2000–2003)
2000	Fort Lewis	3–8	2–6	7th	
2001	Fort Lewis	2–9	1–7	T–8th	
2002	Fort Lewis	3–8	2–6	8th	
2003	Fort Lewis	3–8	2–6	8th	
Fort Lewis:		11–33	7–25		
Total:		11–33			
