= 1998 NCAA Division I-A football rankings =

- Season: 1998
- Bowl season: 1998–99 bowl games
- Preseason No. 1: Ohio State
- End of season champions: Tennessee
- Conference with most teams in final AP poll: Big Ten, Big 12 (5)

Two human polls and one formulaic ranking made up the 1998 NCAA Division I-A football rankings. Unlike most sports, college football's governing body, the National Collegiate Athletic Association (NCAA), did not bestow a National Championship title for Division I-A football. That title was primarily bestowed by different polling agencies. There were several polls that currently existed. The main weekly polls were the AP Poll and Coaches Poll. The Bowl Championship Series (BCS) standings made their debut in 1998, and began being released about halfway through the season.

== Legend ==
	Increase in ranking
	Decrease in ranking
	Not ranked previous week
	Selected for BCS National Championship Game
(#–#)	Win–loss record
(Italics)	Number of first place votes
т	Tied with team above or below also with this symbol

== AP Poll ==
	Preseason Aug 16	Week 1 Sep 7	Week 2 Sep 14	Week 3 Sep 21	Week 4 Sep 28	Week 5 Oct 5	Week 6 Oct 12	Week 7 Oct 19	Week 8 Oct 26	Week 9 Nov 2	Week 10 Nov 9	Week 11 Nov 16	Week 12 Nov 23	Week 13 Nov 30	Week 14 Dec 7	Week 15 (Final) Final	
1.	Ohio State (30)	Ohio State (1–0) (39)	Ohio State (2–0) (57)	Ohio State (3–0) (64)	Ohio State (3–0) (58)	Ohio State (4–0) (66)	Ohio State (5–0) (64)	Ohio State (6–0) (64)	Ohio State (7–0) (64)	Ohio State (8–0) (63)	Tennessee (8–0) (46)	Tennessee (9–0) (37)	Tennessee (10–0) (42)	Tennessee (11–0) (41)	Tennessee (12–0) (70)	Tennessee (13–0) (70)	1.
2.	Florida State (22)	Florida State (1–0) (22)	Florida (2–0) (9)	Nebraska (3–0) (1)	Nebraska (4–0) (7)	Nebraska (5–0) (1)	UCLA (4–0) (1)	UCLA (5–0) (1)	UCLA (6–0) (1)	Tennessee (7–0) (3)	Kansas State (9–0) (19)	Kansas State (10–0) (29)	Kansas State (11–0) (24)	Kansas State (11–0) (24)	Florida State (11–1)	Ohio State (11–1)	2.
3.	Florida (5)	Florida (1–0) (4)	Nebraska (3–0) (1)	UCLA (2–0) (1)	Tennessee (3–0) (2)	UCLA (3–0) (1)	Tennessee (5–0) (3)	Tennessee (5–0) (3)	Tennessee (6–0) (3)	UCLA (7–0) (1)	UCLA (8–0) (4)	UCLA (9–0) (4)	UCLA (10–0) (4)	UCLA (10–0) (3)	Ohio State (10–1)	Florida State (11–2)	3.
4.	Nebraska (4)	Nebraska (2–0) (2)	UCLA (1–0) (1)	Tennessee (2–0) (2)	UCLA (2–0) (1)	Tennessee (4–0)	Kansas State (5–0) (2)	Kansas State (6–0) (2)	Kansas State (7–0) (2)	Kansas State (8–0) (3)	Florida (8–1)	Florida (9–1)	Florida State (11–1)	Florida State (11–1)	Kansas State (11–1)	Arizona (12–1)	4.
5.	Michigan (4)	Kansas State (1–0) (2)	Kansas State (2–0) (2)	Kansas State (3–0) (2)	Kansas State (4–0) (2)	Kansas State (4–0) (2)	Florida (5–1)	Florida (6–1)	Florida State (7–1)	Florida (7–1)	Florida State (9–1) (1)	Florida State (10–1)	Ohio State (10–1)	Ohio State (10–1)	Arizona (11–1)	Florida (10–2)	5.
6.	Kansas State (2)	UCLA (0–0) (1)	Tennessee (1–0)	LSU (2–0)	LSU (3–0)	Florida (4–1)	Florida State (5–1)	Florida State (6–1)	Florida (6–1)	Florida State (8–1)	Texas A&M (9–1)	Texas A&M (10–1)	Texas A&M (10–1)	Arizona (11–1)	UCLA (10–1)	Wisconsin (11–1)	6.
7.	UCLA (1)	LSU (0–0)	LSU (1–0)	Penn State (3–0)	Penn State (3–0)	Georgia (4–0)	Virginia (5–0)	Nebraska (6–1)	Nebraska (7–1)	Texas A&M (8–1)	Ohio State (8–1)	Ohio State (9–1)	Arizona (10–1)	Florida (9–2)	Florida (9–2)	Tulane (12–0)	7.
8.	Arizona State (2)	Tennessee (1–0)	Penn State (2–0)	Florida (2–1)	Florida (3–1)	Florida State (4–1)	Nebraska (5–1)	Texas A&M (6–1)	Texas A&M (7–1)	Wisconsin (8–0)	Wisconsin (9–0)	Arizona (10–1)	Florida (9–2)	Wisconsin (10–1)	Texas A&M (11–2)	UCLA (10–2)	8.
9.	LSU	Penn State (1–0)	Washington (1–0)	Washington (2–0)	Florida State (3–1)	Virginia (5–0)	Wisconsin (6–0)	Wisconsin (7–0)	Wisconsin (8–0)	Penn State (6–1)	Arizona (9–1)	Arkansas (8–1)	Notre Dame (9–1)	Tulane (11–0)	Wisconsin (10–1)	Georgia Tech (10–2)	9.
10.	Tennessee	Notre Dame (1–0)	Virginia (2–0)	Florida State (2–1)	Virginia (4–0)	Arizona (5–0)	Texas A&M (5–1)	Penn State (5–1)	Penn State (5–1)	Arizona (8–1)	Arkansas (8–0)	Notre Dame (8–1)	Wisconsin (10–1)	Texas A&M (10–2)	Tulane (11–0)	Kansas State (11–2)	10.
11.	West Virginia	Washington (1–0)	Florida State (1–1)	Virginia (3–0)	Syracuse (2–1)	LSU (3–1)	Oregon (5–0)	Georgia (5–1)	Georgia (6–1)	Arkansas (7–0)	Nebraska (8–2)	Michigan (8–2)	Tulane (10–0)	Arkansas (9–2)	Arkansas (9–2)	Texas A&M (11–3)	11.
12.	North Carolina	Virginia (1–0)	Georgia (2–0)	Syracuse (2–1)	Georgia (3–0)	Wisconsin (5–0)	Penn State (4–1)	Oregon (5–1)	Oregon (6–1)	Virginia (7–1)	Notre Dame (7–1)	Tulane (9–0)	Georgia (8–2)	Georgia Tech (9–2)	Georgia Tech (9–2)	Michigan (10–3)	12.
13.	Penn State	Michigan (0–1)	Syracuse (1–1)	Georgia (3–0)	Wisconsin (4–0)	Penn State (3–1)	Georgia (4–1)	West Virginia (4–1)	Arizona (7–1)	Notre Dame (6–1)	Missouri (7–2)	Wisconsin (9–1)	Arkansas (8–2)	Nebraska (9–3)	Virginia (9–2)	Air Force (12–1)	13.
14.	Texas A&M	Arizona State (0–1)	Wisconsin (2–0)	Wisconsin (3–0)	Arizona (4–0)	Colorado (5–0)	Virginia Tech (5–0)	Arizona (6–1)	Arkansas (6–0)	Nebraska (7–2)	Tulane (8–0)	Georgia (7–2)	Nebraska (8–3)	Virginia (9–2)	Nebraska (9–3)	Georgia (9–3)	14.
15.	Colorado State	Georgia (1–0)	Colorado (2–0)	Colorado (3–0)	Colorado (4–0)	Oregon (4–0)	West Virginia (4–1)	Arkansas (6–0)	Virginia (6–1)	Syracuse (5–2) т	Michigan (7–2)	Oregon (8–2)	Michigan (8–3)	Michigan (9–3)	Michigan (9–3)	Texas (9–3)	15.
16.	Virginia	Colorado (1–0)	Arizona (2–0)	Arizona (3–0)	West Virginia (2–1)	West Virginia (3–1)	Arizona (5–1)	Virginia (5–1)	Notre Dame (5–1)	Tulane (7–0) т	Virginia Tech (7–1)	Penn State (7–2)	Virginia (8–2)	Notre Dame (9–2)	Air Force (11–1)	Arkansas (9–3)	16.
17.	Syracuse	Wisconsin (1–0)	Texas A&M (1–1)	Texas A&M (2–1)	Oregon (4–0)	Virginia Tech (4–0)	Arkansas (5–0)	Colorado (6–1)	Syracuse (4–2)	Virginia Tech (7–1) т	Georgia (6–2)	Nebraska (8–3)	Georgia Tech (8–2)	Air Force (10–1)	Notre Dame (9–2)	Penn State (9–3)	17.
18.	Washington	Texas A&M (0–1)	USC (2–0)	USC (3–0)	Texas A&M (3–1)	Texas A&M (4–1)	Notre Dame (4–1)	Notre Dame (4–1)	Missouri (5–2)	Missouri (6–2)	Texas (7–2)	Virginia (8–2)	Air Force (10–1)	Syracuse (8–3)	Syracuse (8–3)	Virginia (9–3)	18.
19.	Georgia	Syracuse (0–1)	West Virginia (0–1)	West Virginia (1–1)	Virginia Tech (4–0)	USC (4–1)	Colorado (5–1)	Missouri (5–1)	Tulane (6–0)	Georgia (6–2)	Penn State (6–2)	Missouri (7–3)	Miami (FL) (7–2)	Georgia (8–3)	Georgia (8–3)	Nebraska (9–4)	19.
20.	Wisconsin	West Virginia (0–1)	NC State (2–0)	Oregon (3–0)	Washington (2–1)	Arkansas (4–0)	Missouri (4–1)	Georgia Tech (5–1)	Virginia Tech (6–1)	Texas (6–2)	Oregon (7–2)	Air Force (9–1)	Virginia Tech (8–2)	Texas (8–3)	Texas (8–3)	Miami (FL) (9–3)	20.
21.	Southern Miss	Arizona (1–0)	Missouri (2–0)	Virginia Tech (3–0)	USC (3–1)	Missouri (3–1)	LSU (3–2)	Syracuse (4–2)	West Virginia (4–2)	Oregon (6–2)	Virginia (7–2)	Georgia Tech (7–2)	Syracuse (7–3)	Oregon (8–3)	Oregon (8–3)	Missouri (8–4)	21.
22.	Notre Dame	USC (1–0)	Oregon (2–0)	Alabama (2–0)	Arkansas (3–0)	Notre Dame (3–1)	Texas Tech (6–0)	Tulane (5–0)	Michigan (5–2)	Michigan (6–2)	Georgia Tech (6–2)	Miami (FL) (6–2)	Oregon (8–3)	Penn State (8–3)	Penn State (8–3)	Notre Dame (9–3)	22.
23.	Michigan State	Texas (1–0)	Notre Dame (1–1)	Air Force (3–0) т	Missouri (2–1) т	NC State (3–1)	Syracuse (3–2)	Virginia Tech (5–1)	Georgia Tech (5–2)	Georgia Tech (6–2)	Air Force (8–1)	Virginia Tech (7–2)	Penn State (7–3)	Mississippi State (8–3)	Missouri (7–4)	Virginia Tech (9–3)	23.
24.	Arizona	Oregon (1–0)	Alabama (2–0)	Notre Dame (1–1) т	Notre Dame (2–1) т	Syracuse (2–2)	Tulane (4–0)	Mississippi State (5–1)	Colorado (6–2)	Miami (FL) (5–2)	Miami (FL) (5–2)	Syracuse (6–3)	Missouri (7–4)	Missouri (7–4)	Miami (FL) (8–3)	Purdue (9–4)	24.
25.	Auburn	Missouri (1–0)	Mississippi State (2–0)	Missouri (2–1)	Michigan (2–2)	Tulane (4–0)	Georgia Tech (4–1)	Texas Tech (6–1)	Miami (FL) (4–2)	Air Force (7–1)	Wyoming (8–1)	Texas (7–3)	Mississippi State (7–3)	Virginia Tech (8–3)	Mississippi State (8–4)	Syracuse (8–4)	25.
	Preseason Aug 16	Week 1 Sep 7	Week 2 Sep 14	Week 3 Sep 21	Week 4 Sep 28	Week 5 Oct 5	Week 6 Oct 12	Week 7 Oct 19	Week 8 Oct 26	Week 9 Nov 2	Week 10 Nov 9	Week 11 Nov 16	Week 12 Nov 23	Week 13 Nov 30	Week 14 Dec 7	Week 15 (Final) Final	
		Dropped: Auburn; Colorado State; Michigan State; North Carolina; Southern Miss	Dropped: Arizona State; Michigan; Texas	Dropped: Mississippi State; NC State	Dropped: Air Force; Alabama	Dropped: Michigan; Washington	Dropped: NC State; USC	Dropped: LSU	Dropped: Mississippi State; Texas Tech	Dropped: Colorado; West Virginia	Dropped: Syracuse	Dropped: Wyoming	Dropped: Texas	Dropped: Miami (FL)	Dropped: Virginia Tech	Dropped: Oregon; Mississippi State	

== Coaches poll ==
	Preseason Aug 7	Week 1 Sep 8	Week 2 Sep 14	Week 3 Sep 21	Week 4 Sep 28	Week 5 Oct 5	Week 6 Oct 12	Week 7 Oct 19	Week 8 Oct 26	Week 9 Nov 2	Week 10 Nov 9	Week 11 Nov 16	Week 12 Nov 23	Week 13 Nov 30	Week 14 Dec 7	Week 15 (Final) Jan 6	
1.	Ohio State (31)	Ohio State (1–0) (38)	Ohio State (2–0) (52)	Ohio State (3–0) (53)	Ohio State (3–0) (45)	Ohio State (4–0) (54)	Ohio State (5–0) (59)	Ohio State (6–0) (58)	Ohio State (7–0) (55)	Ohio State (8–0) (54)	Kansas State (9–0) (30) т	Kansas State (10–0) (36½)	Kansas State (11–0) (31½)	Kansas State (11–0) (30½)	Tennessee (12–0) (60)	Tennessee (13–0) (62)	1.
2.	Florida State (10)	Florida State (1–0) (12)	Florida (2–0) (1)	Nebraska (3–0) (7)	Nebraska (4–0) (15)	Nebraska (5–0) (6)	UCLA (4–0) (1)	UCLA (5–0) (1)	UCLA (6–0) (1)	Kansas State (8–0) (5)	Tennessee (8–0) (25) т	Tennessee (9–0) (18½)	Tennessee (10–0) (22½)	Tennessee (11–0) (24½)	Florida State (11–1) (1)	Ohio State (11–1)	2.
3.	Nebraska (12)	Nebraska (2–0) (8)	Nebraska (3–0) (7)	Kansas State (3–0) (1)	Kansas State (4–0) (1)	UCLA (3–0) (1)	Kansas State (5–0) (2)	Kansas State (6–0) (3)	Kansas State (7–0) (5)	Tennessee (7–0) (2)	UCLA (8–0) (7)	UCLA (9–0) (7)	UCLA (10–0) (7)	UCLA (10–0)	Ohio State (10–1) (1)	Florida State (11–2)	3.
4.	Florida (1)	Florida (1–0) (2)	Kansas State (2–0) (1)	Tennessee (2–0)	UCLA (2–0) (1)	Kansas State (4–0) (1)	Tennessee (5–0)	Tennessee (5–0)	Tennessee (6–0) (1)	UCLA (7–0) (1)	Florida (8–1)	Florida (9–1)	Florida State (11–1)	Florida State (11–1)	Kansas State (11–1)	Arizona (12–1)	4.
5.	Michigan (4)	Kansas State (1–0) (1)	UCLA (1–0) (1)	UCLA (2–0) (1)	Tennessee (3–0)	Tennessee (4–0)	Florida (5–1)	Florida (6–1)	Florida (6–1)	Florida (7–1)	Florida State (9–1)	Florida State (10–1)	Ohio State (10–1) (1)	Ohio State (10–1) (1)	UCLA (10–1)	Wisconsin (10–1)	5.
6.	Kansas State (1)	UCLA (0–0) (1)	Tennessee (1–0)	LSU (2–0)	LSU (3–0)	Florida (4–1)	Virginia (5–0)	Florida State (6–1)	Florida State (7–1)	Florida State (8–1)	Wisconsin (9–0)	Ohio State (9–1)	Texas A&M (10–1)	Arizona (11–1)	Arizona (11–1)	Florida (10–2)	6.
7.	UCLA (3)	Tennessee (1–0)	LSU (1–0)	Penn State (3–0)	Penn State (3–0)	Georgia (4–0)	Florida State (5–1)	Nebraska (6–1)	Nebraska (7–1)	Wisconsin (8–0)	Ohio State (8–1)	Texas A&M (10–1)	Arizona (10–1)	Florida (9–2)	Florida (9–2)	Tulane (12–0)	7.
8.	LSU	LSU (0–0)	Penn State (2–0)	Washington (2–0)	Florida (3–1)	Virginia (5–0)	Nebraska (5–1)	Wisconsin (7–0)	Wisconsin (8–0)	Texas A&M (8–1)	Texas A&M (9–1)	Arizona (10–1)	Florida (9–2)	Wisconsin (10–1)	Wisconsin (10–1)	UCLA (10–2)	8.
9.	Arizona State	Penn State (1–0)	Washington (1–0)	Florida (2–1)	Virginia (4–0)	Florida State (4–1)	Wisconsin (6–0)	Penn State (5–1)	Texas A&M (7–1)	Penn State (6–1)	Arkansas (8–0)	Arkansas (8–1)	Wisconsin (10–1)	Tulane (11–0)	Texas A&M (11–2)	Kansas State (11–2)	9.
10.	Tennessee	Washington (1–0)	Virginia (2–0)	Virginia (3–0)	Florida State (3–1)	Wisconsin (5–0)	Virginia Tech (5–0)	Texas A&M (6–1)	Penn State (5–1)	Arkansas (7–0)	Arizona (9–1)	Notre Dame (8–1)	Notre Dame (9–1)	Texas A&M (10–2)	Tulane (11–0)	Air Force (12–1)	10.
11.	North Carolina	Notre Dame (1–0)	Florida State (1–1)	Florida State (2–1)	Syracuse (2–1)	Arizona (5–0)	Penn State (4–1)	Georgia (5–1)	Georgia (6–1)	Arizona (8–1)	Nebraska (8–2)	Michigan (8–2)	Tulane (10–0)	Arkansas (9–2)	Arkansas (9–2)	Georgia Tech (10–2)	11.
12.	West Virginia	Virginia (1–0)	Georgia (2–0)	Georgia (3–0)	Georgia (3–0)	LSU (3–1)	Oregon (5–0)	Arkansas (6–0)	Arkansas (6–0)	Virginia (7–1)	Virginia Tech (7–1)	Wisconsin (9–1)	Georgia (8–2)	Virginia (9–2)	Virginia (9–2)	Michigan (10–3)	12.
13.	Penn State	Georgia (1–0)	Syracuse (1–1)	Syracuse (2–1)	Wisconsin (4–0)	Penn State (3–1)	Texas A&M (5–1)	West Virginia (4–1)	Oregon (6–1)	Notre Dame (6–1)	Notre Dame (7–1)	Tulane (9–0)	Arkansas (8–2)	Air Force (10–1)	Air Force (11–1)	Texas A&M (11–3)	13.
14.	Syracuse	Michigan (0–1)	Wisconsin (2–0)	Wisconsin (2–1)	Arizona (4–0)	Colorado (5–0)	Georgia (4–1)	Oregon (5–1)	Virginia (6–1)	Virginia Tech (7–1)	Tulane (8–0)	Penn State (7–2)	Air Force (10–1)	Georgia Tech (9–2)	Georgia Tech (9–2)	Georgia (9–3)	14.
15.	Texas A&M	Arizona State (0–1)	Colorado (2–0)	Colorado (3–0)	Colorado (4–0)	Virginia Tech (4–0)	West Virginia (4–1)	Virginia (5–1)	Arizona (7–1)	Nebraska (7–2)	Missouri (7–2)	Georgia (7–2)	Virginia (8–2)	Michigan (9–3)	Michigan (9–3)	Penn State (9–3)	15.
16.	Colorado State	Colorado (1–0)	USC (2–0)	Arizona (3–0)	Virginia Tech (4–0)	Oregon (4–0)	Arkansas (5–0)	Arizona (6–1)	Notre Dame (5–1)	Tulane (7–0)	Michigan (7–2)	Oregon (8–2)	Michigan (8–3)	Notre Dame (9–2)	Nebraska (9–3)	Texas (9–3)	16.
17.	Washington	Wisconsin (1–0)	Arizona (2–0)	USC (3–0)	Oregon (4–0) т	West Virginia (3–1)	Arizona (5–1)	Colorado (6–1)	Virginia Tech (6–1)	Syracuse (5–2)	Penn State (6–2)	Air Force (9–1)	Nebraska (8–3)	Nebraska (9–3)	Syracuse (8–3)	Arkansas (9–3)	17.
18.	Georgia	Syracuse (0–1)	Texas A&M (1–1)	Texas A&M (2–1)	West Virginia (2–1) т	Texas A&M (4–1)	Colorado (5–1)	Missouri (5–1)	Tulane (6–0)	Georgia (6–2)	Georgia (6–2)	Virginia (8–2)	Georgia Tech (8–2)	Syracuse (8–3)	Notre Dame (9–2)	Virginia (9–3)	18.
19.	Virginia	Texas A&M (0–1)	Missouri (2–0)	Virginia Tech (3–0)	Texas A&M (2–2)	Arkansas (4–0)	Missouri (4–1)	Georgia Tech (4–1)	Syracuse (4–2)	Missouri (6–2)	Oregon (7–2)	Nebraska (8–3)	Virginia Tech (8–2)	Georgia (8–3)	Georgia (8–3)	Virginia Tech (9–3)	19.
20.	Wisconsin	West Virginia (0–1)	West Virginia (0–1)	West Virginia (1–1)	Washington (2–1)	USC (4–1)	Notre Dame (4–1)	Notre Dame (4–1)	West Virginia (4–2)	Oregon (6–2)	Air Force (8–1)	Virginia Tech (7–2)	Miami (FL) (7–2)	Penn State (8–3)	Penn State (8–3)	Nebraska (9–4)	20.
21.	Southern Miss	Arizona (1–0)	Virginia Tech (2–0)	Oregon (3–0)	Missouri (2–1)	Missouri (3–1)	LSU (3–2)	Virginia Tech (5–1)	Missouri (5–2)	Air Force (7–1)	Texas (7–2)	Georgia Tech (7–2)	Penn State (7–3)	Oregon (8–3)	Oregon (8–3)	Miami (FL) (9–3)	21.
22.	Auburn	Texas (1–0)	Alabama (2–0)	Alabama (2–0)	USC (3–1)	Notre Dame (3–1)	Syracuse (3–2)	Syracuse (4–2)	Michigan (5–2)	Michigan (6–2)	Virginia (7–2)	Miami (FL) (6–2)	Syracuse (7–3)	Mississippi State (8–3)	Texas (8–3)	Notre Dame (9–3)	22.
23.	Michigan State	USC (1–0)	Oregon (2–0)	Air Force (3–0)	Notre Dame (2–1)	NC State (3–1)	Texas Tech (6–0)	Tulane (5–0)	Air Force (6–1)	Texas (6–2)	Georgia Tech (5–2)	Missouri (7–3)	Oregon (8–3)	Texas (8–3)	Mississippi State (8–4)	Purdue (9–4)	23.
24.	Notre Dame	North Carolina (0–1)	NC State (2–0)	Missouri (2–1)	Arkansas (3–0)	Syracuse (2–2)	Tulane (4–0)	Mississippi State (5–1)	Georgia Tech (5–2)	Georgia Tech (5–2)	Miami (FL) (5–2)	Syracuse (6–3)	Mississippi State (7–3)	Virginia Tech (8–3)	Virginia Tech (8–3)	Syracuse (8–4)	24.
25.	Arizona	Missouri (1–0)	Notre Dame (1–1)	Kentucky (3–0)	Tulane (3–0)	Tulane (4–0)	Georgia Tech (4–1)	Texas Tech (6–1)	Colorado (6–2)	Colorado (6–2)	Syracuse (5–3) т; Wyoming (8–1) т	Kentucky (7–3)	Missouri (7–4)	West Virginia (8–3)	West Virginia (8–3)	Missouri (8–4)	25.
	Preseason Aug 7	Week 1 Sep 8	Week 2 Sep 14	Week 3 Sep 21	Week 4 Sep 28	Week 5 Oct 5	Week 6 Oct 12	Week 7 Oct 19	Week 8 Oct 26	Week 9 Nov 2	Week 10 Nov 9	Week 11 Nov 16	Week 12 Nov 23	Week 13 Nov 30	Week 14 Dec 7	Week 15 (Final) Jan 6	
		Dropped: Colorado State; Southern Miss; Auburn; Michigan State	Dropped: Michigan; Arizona State; Texas; North Carolina	Dropped: NC State; Notre Dame	Dropped: Alabama; Air Force; Kentucky	Dropped: Washington	Dropped: USC; NC State	Dropped: LSU	Dropped: Mississippi State; Texas Tech	Dropped: West Virginia	Dropped: Colorado	Dropped: Texas; Wyoming	Dropped: Kentucky	Dropped: Miami (FL); Missouri	None	Dropped: Oregon; Mississippi State; West Virginia	

== BCS standings ==
The Bowl Championship Series (BCS) determined the two teams that competed in the BCS National Championship Game, the 1999 Fiesta Bowl.

Each week, the BCS standings ranked the top 15 teams, or down to the lowest-ranked Automatic Qualifying conference leader.

	Week 8 Oct 26	Week 9 Nov 2	Week 10 Nov 9	Week 11 Nov 16	Week 12 Nov 23	Week 13 Nov 30	Week 14 (Final) Dec 7	
1.	UCLA (6–0)	Ohio State (8–0)	Tennessee (8–0)	Tennessee (9–0)	Tennessee (10–0)	Tennessee (11–0)	Tennessee (12–0)	1.
2.	Ohio State (7–0)	Tennessee (7–0)	UCLA (8–0)	UCLA (9–0)	UCLA (10–0)	UCLA (10–0)	Florida State (11–1)	2.
3.	Tennessee (6–0)	UCLA (7–0)	Kansas State (9–0)	Kansas State (10–0)	Kansas State (11–0)	Kansas State (11–0)	Kansas State (11–1)	3.
4.	Kansas State (7–0)	Kansas State (8–0)	Florida State (9–1)	Florida State (10–1)	Florida State (11–1)	Florida State (11–1)	Ohio State (10–1)	4.
5.	Florida State (7–1)	Florida (7–1)	Florida (8–1)	Florida (9–1)	Texas A&M (10–1)	Ohio State (10–1)	UCLA (10–1)	5.
6.	Nebraska (7–1)	Florida State (8–1)	Texas A&M (9–1)	Texas A&M (10–1)	Ohio State (10–1)	Arizona (11–1)	Texas A&M (11–2)	6.
7.	Florida (6–1)	Texas A&M (8–1)	Arkansas (8–0)	Ohio State (9–1)	Arizona (10–1)	Florida (9–2)	Arizona (11–1)	7.
8.	Texas A&M (7–1)	Wisconsin (8–0)	Ohio State (8–1)	Arizona (10–1)	Florida (9–2)	Texas A&M (10–2)	Florida (9–2)	8.
9.	Wisconsin (8–0)	Penn State (6–1)	Wisconsin (9–0)	Arkansas (8–1)	Notre Dame (9–1)	Wisconsin (10–1)	Wisconsin (10–1)	9.
10.	Penn State (5–1)	Arizona (8–1)	Arizona (9–1)	Notre Dame (8–1)	Wisconsin (10–1)	Tulane (11–0)	Tulane (11–0)	10.
11.	Oregon (6–1)	Arkansas (7–0)	Nebraska (8–2)	Oregon (8–2)	Tulane (10–0)	Nebraska (9–3)	Nebraska (9–3)	11.
12.	Arkansas (6–0)	Nebraska (7–2)	Notre Dame (7–1)	Michigan (7–2)	Nebraska (8–3)	Georgia Tech (9–2)	Virginia (9–2)	12.
13.	Georgia (6–1)	Notre Dame (6–1)	Missouri (7–2)	Wisconsin (9–1)	Arkansas (8–2)	Arkansas (9–2)	Arkansas (9–2)	13.
14.	Arizona (7–1)	Texas (6–2)	Oregon (7–2)	Nebraska (8–3)	Michigan (8–3)	Virginia (9–2)	Georgia Tech (9–2)	14.
15.	Virginia (6–1)	Virginia (7–1)	Texas (7–2)	Georgia (7–2)	Georgia (8–2)	Syracuse (8–3)	Syracuse (8–3)	15.
16.	Notre Dame (5–1)	Tulane (7–0)	Tulane (8–0)	Tulane (9–0)	Air Force (10–1)	—	—	16.
17.	Georgia Tech (5–2)	Syracuse (5–2)	Georgia (6–2)	Penn State (7–2)	Virginia (8–2)	—	—	17.
18.	Missouri (5–2)	—	Penn State (6–2)	Air Force (9–1)	Oregon (8–3)	—	—	18.
19.	Tulane (6–0)	—	Michigan (7–2)	Missouri (7–3)	Georgia Tech (8–2)	—	—	19.
20.	Syracuse (4–2)	—	Virginia Tech (7–1)	USC (7–3)	Miami (FL) (7–2)	—	—	20.
21.	—	—	—	Virginia (8–2)	—	—	—	21.
22.	—	—	—	Georgia Tech (7–2)	—	—	—	22.
23.	—	—	—	Texas (7–3)	—	—	—	23.
24.	—	—	—	Miami (FL) (6–2)	—	—	—	24.
	Week 8 Oct 26	Week 9 Nov 2	Week 10 Nov 9	Week 11 Nov 16	Week 12 Nov 23	Week 13 Nov 30	Week 14 (Final) Dec 7	
		Dropped: Oregon; Georgia; Georgia Tech; Missouri	Dropped: Virginia; Syracuse	Dropped: Virginia Tech	Dropped: Penn State; Missouri; USC; Texas	Dropped: Notre Dame; Michigan; Georgia; Air Force; Oregon; Miami (FL)	None	
