= 1998 Pacific-10 Conference football season =

American college football season

- League: NCAA Division I FBS (Football Bowl Subdivision)
- Sport: Football
- Teams: 10

Regular Season
- Champion: UCLA Bruins

Football seasons
- 1997 1999

1998 Pacific-10 Conference football standings
	Conf.			Overall
Team	W		L	W		L
No. 8 UCLA $	8	–	0	10	–	2
No. 4 Arizona	7	–	1	12	–	1
Oregon	5	–	3	8	–	4
USC	5	–	3	8	–	5
Washington	4	–	4	6	–	6
Arizona State	4	–	4	5	–	6
California	3	–	5	5	–	6
Oregon State	2	–	6	5	–	6
Stanford	2	–	6	3	–	8
Washington State	0	–	8	3	–	8
$ – BCS representative as conference champion; Rankings from AP Poll

The Pacific-10 Conference football season in 1998 ended with the UCLA Bruins winning the conference with an undefeated 8–0 conference record.

== Bowl games ==
Pac-10 teams played in the following bowl games. Pac-10 teams are bolded. Rankings from BCS.

Bowl Game	Date	Stadium	City	Television	Time (PST)	Team	Score	Team	Score	Attendance
Aloha Bowl	December 25	Aloha Stadium	Honolulu, Hawaii	ABC	12:30 PM	Colorado	51	**Oregon**	43	46,451
Oahu Bowl	December 25	Aloha Stadium	Honolulu, Hawaii	ESPN	5:30 PM	Air Force	43	**Washington**	25	34,083
Holiday Bowl	December 30	Qualcomm Stadium	San Diego, California	ESPN	5:00 PM	#7 **Arizona**	23	#11 Nebraska	20	65,354
Sun Bowl	December 31	Sun Bowl Stadium	El Paso, Texas	CBS	11:00 AM	**USC**	19	TCU	28	46,612
Rose Bowl	January 1	Rose Bowl	Pasadena, California	ABC	2:00 PM	#9 Wisconsin	38	#5 **UCLA**	31	93,872

== Awards and honors ==
=== Conference awards ===
The following individuals won the conference's annual player and coach awards:

- Offensive Player of the Year: Cade McNown, QB, UCLA; Akili Smith, QB, Oregon
- Defensive Player of the Year: Chris Claiborne, ILB, USC
- Coach of the Year: Bob Toledo, UCLA

=== All-Conference teams ===
The following players earned All-Pac-10 honors:

Offense:

First Team				Second Team		
Pos.	Name	Yr.	School	Name	Yr.	School
QB	Cade McNown	Sr.	UCLA	Keith Smith		Arizona
QB	Akili Smith	Sr.	Oregon	N/A	N/A	N/A
RB	J. R. Redmond	Jr.	Arizona State	Reuben Droughns		Oregon
RB	Trung Canidate	Jr.	Arizona	Kevin Brown		Washington State
WR	Dameane Douglas	Sr.	California	Jeremy McDaniel		Arizona
FL	Danny Farmer	Jr.	UCLA	Troy Walters		Stanford
FL	N/A	N/A	N/A	R. Jay Soward		USC
TE	Mike Grieb	Sr.	UCLA	Jed Weaver		Oregon
OL	Kris Farris	Jr.	UCLA	Tony Coats		Washington
OL	Yusuf Scott	Jr.	Arizona	Edwin Mulitalo		Arizona
OL	Andy Meyers	Sr.	UCLA	Shawn Stuart		UCLA
OL	Travis Claridge	Jr.	USC	Mike McLaughlin		Stanford
OL	Grey Ruegamer	Sr.	Arizona State	N/A	N/A	N/A
OL	John Welbourn	Sr.	California	N/A	N/A	N/A

Defense:

First Team				Second Team		
Pos.	Name	Yr.	School	Name	Yr.	School
DL	Inoke Breckterfield	Sr.	Oregon State	Jerry DeLoach		California
DL	Jabari Issa	Jr.	Washington	Andre Carter		California
DL	Daniel Greer		Arizona	Sultan Abdul-Malik		USC
DL	Ennis Davis	So.	USC	Mac Tuiaea		Washington
LB	Chris Claiborne	Jr.	USC	Bryan Jones		Oregon State
LB	Brendon Ayanbadejo	Sr.	UCLA	Matt Beck		California
LB	Sekou Sanyika	Jr.	California	Donnie Spragan		Stanford
LB	Marcus Bell	Jr.	Arizona	DaShon Polk		Arizona
CB	Chris McAlister	Sr.	Arizona	Dee Moronkola		Washington State
CB	Daylon McCutcheon	Sr.	USC	Antuan Simmons		USC
S	Larry Atkins	Sr.	UCLA	Marquis Smith		California
S	Rashard Cook	Sr.	USC	Lamont Thompson		Washington State

Specialists:

First Team				Second Team		
Pos.	Name	Yr.	School	Name	Yr.	School
PK	Nathan Villegas	Jr.	Oregon	José Cortéz		Oregon State
P	Josh Bidwell	Sr.	Oregon	Stephen Baker		Arizona State
RS	J. R. Redmond	Jr.	Arizona State	Tim Alexander		Oregon State
ST	John McLaughlin	Sr.	California	Jamil Braithwaite		Oregon
AP	Joe Jarzynka	Jr.	Washington	N/A	N/A	N/A
