= 1998 California Golden Bears football team =

American college football season

1998 California Golden Bears football
- Conference: Pacific-10 Conference
- Record: 5–6 (3–5 Pac-10)
- Head coach: Tom Holmoe (2nd season)
- Offensive coordinator: Doug Cosbie (2nd season)
- Defensive coordinator: Lyle Setencich (2nd season)
- Captains: Matt Beck; Dameane Douglas; Sekou Sanyika; John Welbourn
- Home stadium: California Memorial Stadium

1998 Pacific-10 Conference football standings
	Conf.			Overall
Team	W		L	W		L
No. 8 UCLA $	8	–	0	10	–	2
No. 4 Arizona	7	–	1	12	–	1
Oregon	5	–	3	8	–	4
USC	5	–	3	8	–	5
Washington	4	–	4	6	–	6
Arizona State	4	–	4	5	–	6
California	3	–	5	5	–	6
Oregon State	2	–	6	5	–	6
Stanford	2	–	6	3	–	8
Washington State	0	–	8	3	–	8
$ – BCS representative as conference champion; Rankings from AP Poll

The 1998 California Golden Bears football team was an American football team that represented the University of California, Berkeley as a member of the Pacific-10 Conference (Pac-10) during the 1998 NCAA Division I-A football season. In their second year under head coach Tom Holmoe, the Golden Bears compiled am overall record of 5–6 record with a mark of 3–5 against conference opponents, placing in seventh in the Pac-10, and were outscored by opponents of 251 to 183. The team played home games at California Memorial Stadium in Berkeley, California.

The team's statistical leaders included Justin Vedder with 2,322 passing yards, Marcus Fields with 734 rushing yards, and Dameane Douglas with 1,150 receiving yards.

== Schedule ==
Date	Time	Opponent	Site	TV	Result	Attendance	Source
September 5	12:30 p.m.	Houston*	California Memorial Stadium; Berkeley, CA		W 14–10	33,000	
September 12	4:00 p.m.	No. 4 Nebraska*	California Memorial Stadium; Berkeley, CA	FSN	L 3–24	67,000	
September 19	4:00 p.m.	at Oklahoma*	Oklahoma Memorial Stadium; Norman, OK	FSNBA	W 13–12	74,235	
September 26	4:00 p.m.	Washington State	California Memorial Stadium; Berkeley, CA	ABC	W 24–14	32,497	
October 10	3:30 p.m.	at No. 19 USC	Los Angeles Memorial Coliseum; Los Angeles, CA	FSNBA	W 32–31	65,678	
October 17	3:30 p.m.	at Washington	Husky Stadium; Seattle, WA	FSN	L 13–21	71,215	
October 24	12:30 p.m.	No. 2 UCLA	California Memorial Stadium; Berkeley, CA (rivalry)	ABC	L 16–28	55,000	
October 31	1:00 p.m.	at Oregon State	Parker Stadium; Corvallis, OR		W 20–19	23,594	
November 7	3:00 p.m.	at Arizona State	Sun Devil Stadium; Tempe, AZ		L 22–55	64,973	
November 14	12:30 p.m.	No. 9 Arizona	California Memorial Stadium; Berkeley, CA	FSN	L 23–27	36,500	
November 21	12:30 p.m.	Stanford	California Memorial Stadium; Berkeley, CA (Big Game)	ABC	L 3–10	69,000	
*Non-conference game; Rankings from AP Poll released prior to the game; All times are in Pacific time

== Roster ==
1998 California Golden Bears football team roster
Players
Coaches
Offense

Pos.	#	Name	Class
WR	3	Michael Ainsworth	Fr
WR	15	Omar Bennett	Fr
TE	85	Eric Brandon
C	63	Caleb Brown	Sr
QB	5	Samuel Clemons
QB	18	Wesley Dalton
QB	86	Ronnie Davenport	Fr
FB	38	Josh Del Prado
C	60	Reed Diehl	So
OT	71	Kevin Doherty	Jr
WR	81	Dameane Douglas	Sr
TB	4	Marcus Fields
OL	62	Adam Fisher	Fr
FB	46	Mike Freeman
OL	79	Brian Gray
RB	25	Chris Hanks
TE	47	Marcus Helfman
TE	45	A.J. Kunkle
G	79	Brandon Ludwig
WR	82	Eddie Macha	Fr
OL	74	Joe Major	Fr
OT	70	Jeff Martin
G	76	Tate McCallister
WR	91	Scott McMorris
FB	37	Saleem Muhammad
RB	35	Marcus Oliver
QB	16	David Page
FB	93	Matt Peters
WR	83	Bruce Pierre
WR	88	Phillip Pipersburg
OT	72	Warren Rick
C, G	73	John Romero
FB	48	Rashad Slocumb
TE	32	Corey Smith
FB	41	Ryan Stanger
WR	80	Brian Stumpf	Jr
OL	77	Doug Styles
TE	87	Brian Surgener
OT	75	Kevin Swillis
QB	17	Ryan Tollner
QB	10	Justin Vedder
OL	66	Langston Walker	Fr
G	64	John Welbourn	Sr
WR	4	Brian White
FB	40	Joshua White
TB	2	Brandon Willis	Sr
WR	6	Joel Young	Jr

Defense

Pos.	#	Name	Class
LB	46	Tully Banta-Cain	Fr
ILB	59	Matt Beck	Jr
DE	97	Andre Carter	So
LB	43	Jamal Cherry	Fr
CB	29	Anthony Coffey	Jr
DE	98	Jerry DeLoach	Jr
S	20	Peter Destefano	Jr
LB	44	Albert Dorsey	Sr
LB	50	Fa'avae Fa'avae	Jr
ILB	42	Justin Flagg	Sr
S, LB	49	Scott Fujita	Fr
DB	31	Derrick Gardner	Sr
ILB	99	Nate Gelderman	So
NT	92	James Gibson	Sr
S	36	Dewey Hale	Fr
CB	11	Drae Harris	Jr
DB	25	Chidi Iwuoma	So
DT	55	Kasey Jackson	Jr
DE	30	Roy Jackson
LB	17	Juan Jimenez	Jr
S	24	Damian Marzett
DE	33	John McLaughlin	Sr
ILB, DE	53	Keith Miller	Jr
LB	45	Matt Nixon	Fr
CB	8	Deltha O'Neal	Jr
DB	22	Mark Orr	Sr
DL	95	Jeremiah Parker	Jr
DB	28	Harold Pearson
CB	21	Jemeel Powell	Fr
OLB	13	Sekou Sanyika	Jr
S	19	Don Smith
LB	51	Jason Smith
S	9	Marquis Smith
DB	23	Demetrius Stampley
LB	47	Josh Trowbridge
DE	58	Mawuko Tugbenyoh	Jr
LB	34	Paul Urgenti
DT	94	Jacob Waasdorp	So
DB	14	LaShaun Ward	Fr
S	37	Bert Watts
DB	39	David Watts
DE	78	Zech Whittington

Special teams

Pos.	#	Name	Class
PK	27	Ignacio Brache
P	89	Nick Harris	So
PK	29	Tim Wolleck

Head coach

- Tom Holmoe

Coordinators/assistant coaches

- Doug Cosbie
  Offensive coordinator
- Lyle Setencich
  Defensive coordinator
- Bobby Fresques
  Offensive assistant

Legend

- (C) Team captain
- (S) Suspended
- (I) Ineligible
- Injured
- Redshirt

Roster
Last update: 2017-Sep-11
