= Reuben Droughns =

American football player (born 1978)

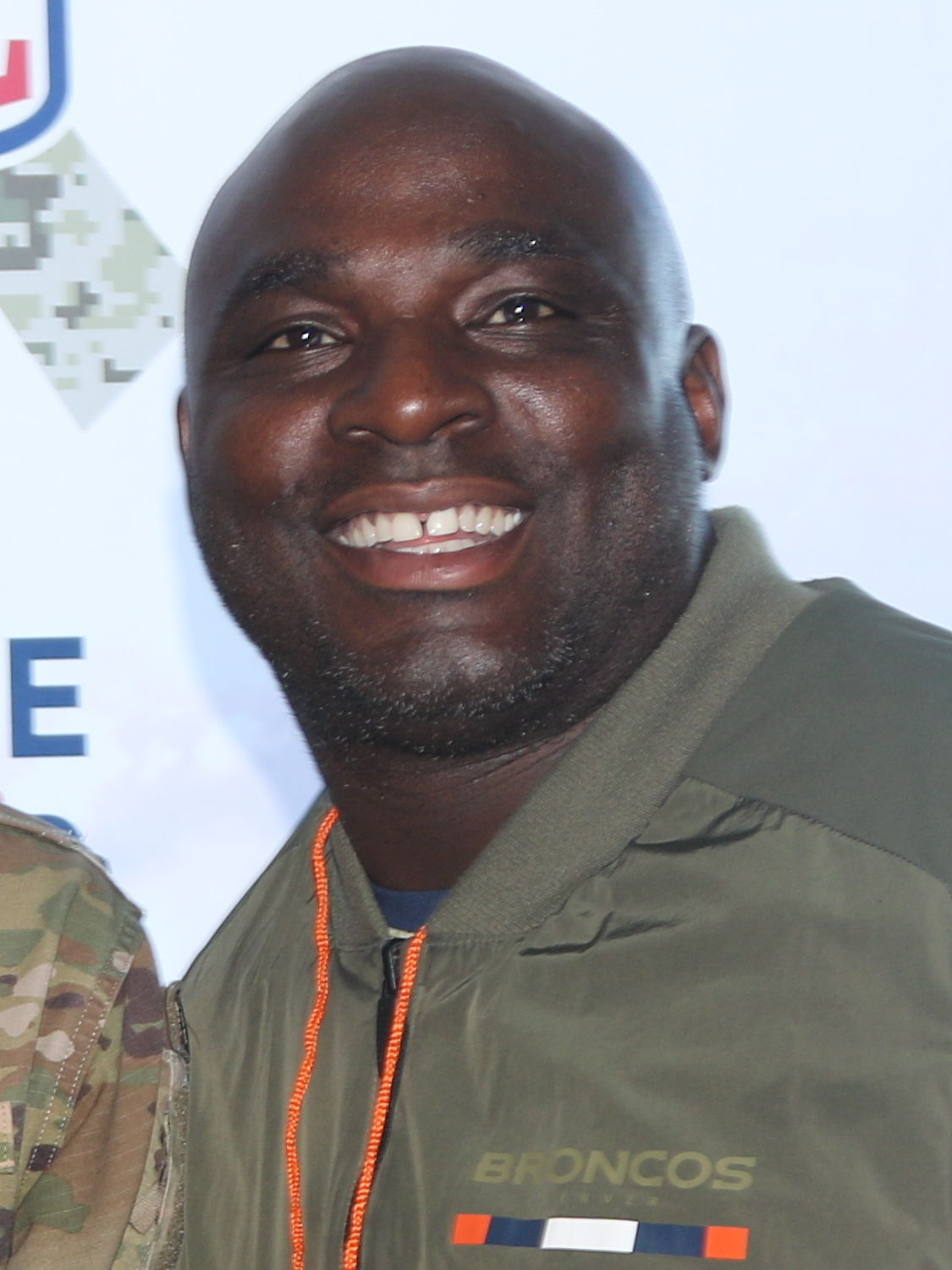
- Droughns in 2021

No. 21, 34, 22
- Position: Running back

Personal information
- Born: August 21, 1978 (age 48); Chicago, Illinois, U.S.
- Listed height: 5 ft 11 in (1.80 m)
- Listed weight: 220 lb (100 kg)

Career information
- High school: Anaheim (Anaheim, California)
- College: Merced (1996–1997); Oregon (1998–1999)
- NFL draft: 2000: 3rd round, 81st overall pick

Career history
- Detroit Lions (2000–2001); Miami Dolphins (2001)*; Detroit Lions (2001); Denver Broncos (2002–2004); Cleveland Browns (2005–2006); New York Giants (2007–2008)
- * Offseason or practice squad member only

Awards and highlights
- Super Bowl champion (XLII); First-team All-Pac-10 (1999); Second-team All-Pac-10 (1998)

Career NFL statistics
- Rushing attempts: 929
- Rushing yards: 3,602
- Rushing touchdowns: 19
- Receptions: 123
- Receiving yards: 989
- Receiving touchdowns: 6
- Stats at Pro Football Reference

Reuben Droughns (/ˈdroʊnz/; born August 21, 1978) is an American former professional football player who was a running back in the National Football League (NFL). After playing college football for the Oregon Ducks, he was selected by the Detroit Lions in the third round of the 2000 NFL draft. During his nine years playing professional football, Droughns was also a member of the Miami Dolphins, Denver Broncos, Cleveland Browns, and New York Giants of the National Football League (NFL). He earned a Super Bowl ring with the Giants in their Super Bowl XLII victory against the New England Patriots.

Following his playing career, Droughns worked as an assistant coach for the Serbian team Vukovi Beograd, the two-time champions of the Central European Football League (CEFL) from 2010 to 2013.

== Early life ==
Born in Chicago, Droughns moved from the Midwest to Orange County, California where he attended Anaheim High School (Anaheim, California) and was a student and a letterman in football and wrestling. In football, he rushed for 49 touchdowns and 4,915 yards, which ranked as the second-most yards gained in Orange County high school football history when he ended his prep career. He was voted All-Orange County and All-CIF twice and All-Orange League three times, including Back of the Year honors as a senior. Droughns was also an accomplished wrestler, winning the CIF-Southern Section title in 1996 (Division I - 189 pounds) during his senior year.

== College career ==
At Merced Junior College, Droughns was a first team JUCO All-America selection as a sophomore after leading the nation in yards in 1997 with 1,611 while also scoring 13 touchdowns and leading the state of California in all-purpose yardage with 1,984 despite missing three games with a broken hand. PrepStar magazine deemed him the nation's top JUCO running back after that campaign. Droughns was also an honorable mention All-American as a freshman, when he led the Blue Devils in rushing with 1,456 yards and 14 touchdowns.

Droughns played college football at the University of Oregon in 1998 and 1999 and was a two-year starter. In his first game for the Ducks, he ran for 202 yards and two scores in a 48–14 rout of Michigan State. Although he missed one game and most of another due to an ankle injury, he ran for 214 yards and three touchdowns in a 63–28 blowout win over Stanford and then 217 yards and three scores on the road against Washington State. One of his most impressive performances came at UCLA, where he ran for 172 yards and a score despite fracturing his right fibula late in the contest (a 41–38 overtime loss), an injury that would force him to miss the rest of the season. Despite the injury, Droughns was still named second team All-Pac-10 for his junior season. Droughns had 1,234 yards and nine touchdowns on 277 carries (4.5 yards per carry) as a senior, including rushing for over 200 yards in three contests, and was a first-team All-Pac-10 choice as a senior. Droughns was a history major at Oregon.

== Professional career ==
=== Detroit Lions ===
==== 2000 season ====
Droughns was selected by the Detroit Lions in the third round (81st pick overall) of the 2000 NFL draft. Droughns spent the 2000 season on injured reserve after separating his right shoulder on his first carry in Detroit's opening preseason game against the New England Patriots on August 4, then placed on injured reserve August 22.

==== 2001 season ====
During the 2001 season, Droughns played in nine games and started three for the Lions, rushing for 72 yards on 30 carries (2.4) and catching four passes for 21 yards (5.3) and a touchdown. He was waived by Detroit after Week 1 and was signed to Miami's practice squad on September 18 before being re-signed by the Lions on October 9.

=== Denver Broncos ===
==== 2002–2004 seasons ====
Droughns played for the Denver Broncos for three seasons from 2002 to 2004. Although originally intended to be a fullback, he became the Broncos' starting running back in 2004. Starting 15 out of 16 games, Droughns ultimately rushed for 1,240 yards and six touchdowns. He also tied a playoff franchise record by returning six kickoffs in the wildcard loss to Indianapolis, January 4, 2004. Despite this production, Droughns was not guaranteed the starting job for the 2005 season, so he asked for a trade.

=== Cleveland Browns ===
==== 2005–2006 seasons ====
Droughns was traded to the Cleveland Browns on March 30, 2005, for defensive linemen Ebenezer Ekuban and Michael Myers. In 2005 he ran for 1,232 yards and two touchdowns, becoming the first Browns player to gain 1,000 yards rushing in a season since Earnest Byner and Kevin Mack both achieved the feat in 1985. The following season, Droughns rushed for 758 yards and four touchdowns.

=== New York Giants ===
==== 2007–2008 seasons ====
On March 9, 2007, Droughns was traded to the New York Giants in exchange for wide receiver Tim Carter. Playing behind starter Brandon Jacobs, Droughns battled Derrick Ward for the back-up job but became the third running back for the Giants as part of a rotation that replaced the retired Tiki Barber. However, due to his poor performances throughout the year, he dropped to fourth on the Giants depth chart behind rookie Ahmad Bradshaw, and was replaced by Domenik Hixon as kick returner after similar special-teams performances. Though he only started one game during the season, Droughns finished as the Giants third-leading rusher, totaling 275 yards on 85 carries and seven receptions for 49 yards. He was however, primarily used as a goal-line/third down back for most of the regular season, recording a team-leading six rushing touchdowns for the season. In what would turn out to be his final NFL touchdown, Droughns scored on a 2-yard run with 1:37 remaining for the winning points in a 21–16 victory on the road against the Chicago Bears, which proved to be critical in helping the Giants advance to the postseason. During the playoffs, Droughns played primarily on special teams and participated in all four of New York's playoff victories, including the Giants' 17–14 upset victory over the New England Patriots in Super Bowl XLII, where he was on the field for the game's final play. In the 2008 preseason, the emergence of D.J. Ware dropped Droughns to fifth on the Giants' depth chart at running back, but he managed to make the final 53-man roster playing primarily on special teams in 12 of New York's 16 games.

Droughns was released by the Giants on February 9, 2009.

== NFL career statistics ==
Legend
**Bold**	Career high

=== Regular season ===
Year	Team	Games		Rushing					Receiving				
Year	Team	GP	GS	Att	Yds	Avg	Lng	TD	Rec	Yds	Avg	Lng	TD
2001	DET	9	3	30	72	2.4	15	0	4	21	5.3	8	1
2002	DEN	**16**	0	4	11	2.8	9	1	5	53	**10.6**	22	1
2003	DEN	15	4	6	14	2.3	12	0	9	87	9.7	15	**2**
2004	DEN	**16**	15	275	**1,240**	**4.5**	51	**6**	32	241	7.5	23	**2**
2005	CLE	**16**	**16**	**309**	1,232	4.0	**75**	2	**39**	**369**	9.5	**51**	0
2006	CLE	14	12	220	758	3.4	22	4	27	169	6.3	24	0
2007	NYG	**16**	1	85	275	3.2	45	**6**	7	49	7.0	11	0
2008	NYG	12	0	0	0	0.0	0	0	0	0	0.0	0	0
Career		114	51	929	3,602	3.9	75	19	123	989	8.0	51	6

=== Playoffs ===
Year	Team	Games		Rushing					Receiving				
Year	Team	GP	GS	Att	Yds	Avg	Lng	TD	Rec	Yds	Avg	Lng	TD
2003	DEN	1	**1**	0	0	0.0	0	0	**5**	19	3.8	**10**	0
2004	DEN	1	**1**	**8**	**29**	**3.6**	**6**	0	4	**28**	**7.0**	9	0
2007	NYG	**4**	0	0	0	0.0	0	0	0	0	0.0	0	0
Career		6	2	8	29	3.6	6	0	9	47	5.2	10	0
