= 1998 UCLA Bruins football team =

American college football season

1998 UCLA Bruins football

Pac-10 champion

Rose Bowl, L 31–38 vs. Wisconsin
- Conference: Pacific-10 Conference

Ranking
- Coaches: No. 8
- AP: No. 8
- Record: 10–2 (8–0 Pac-10)
- Head coach: Bob Toledo (3rd season)
- Offensive coordinator: Al Borges (3rd season)
- Offensive scheme: Pro-style
- Defensive coordinator: Nick Aliotti (1st season)
- Base defense: 3–4
- Home stadium: Rose Bowl

1998 Pacific-10 Conference football standings
	Conf.			Overall
Team	W		L	W		L
No. 8 UCLA $	8	–	0	10	–	2
No. 4 Arizona	7	–	1	12	–	1
Oregon	5	–	3	8	–	4
USC	5	–	3	8	–	5
Washington	4	–	4	6	–	6
Arizona State	4	–	4	5	–	6
California	3	–	5	5	–	6
Oregon State	2	–	6	5	–	6
Stanford	2	–	6	3	–	8
Washington State	0	–	8	3	–	8
$ – BCS representative as conference champion; Rankings from AP Poll

The 1998 UCLA Bruins football team represented the University of California, Los Angeles (UCLA) as a member of the Pacific-10 Conference (Pac-10) during the 1998 NCAA Division I-A football season. Led by third-year head coach Bob Toledo, the Bruins compiled an overall record of 10–2 with a mark of 8–0 in conference play, winning the Pac-10 title. UCLA earned a berth in the Rose Bowl, where the Bruins lost to Wisconsin. UCLA was ranked No. 8 in both the final AP poll and the final Coaches Poll. The team played home games at the Rose Bowl in Pasadena, California.

== Schedule ==
Date	Time	Opponent	Rank	Site	TV	Result	Attendance	Source
September 12	12:30 pm	No. 23 Texas*	No. 6	Rose Bowl; Pasadena, CA	ABC	W 49–31	73,070	
September 19	12:30 pm	at Houston*	No. 4	Robertson Stadium; Houston, TX	FX	W 42–24	19,540	
October 3	12:30 pm	Washington State	No. 4	Rose Bowl; Pasadena, CA	ABC	W 49–17	67,210	
October 10	7:15 pm	at No. 10 Arizona	No. 3	Arizona Stadium; Tucson, AZ	FSN	W 52–28	58,738	
October 17	12:30 pm	No. 11 Oregon	No. 2	Rose Bowl; Pasadena, CA (College GameDay)	ABC	W 41–38 ^{OT}	75,367	
October 24	12:30 pm	at California	No. 2	California Memorial Stadium; Berkeley, CA (rivalry)	ABC	W 28–16	55,000	
October 31	3:30 pm	Stanford^{†}	No. 2	Rose Bowl; Pasadena, CA (rivalry)	FX	W 28–24	64,820	
November 7	3:30 pm	at Oregon State	No. 3	Parker Stadium; Corvallis, OR	FSN	W 41–34	26,017	
November 14	12:30 pm	at Washington	No. 3	Husky Stadium; Seattle, WA	ABC	W 36–24	72,391	
November 21	12:30 pm	USC	No. 3	Rose Bowl; Pasadena, CA (Victory Bell)	ABC	W 34–17	88,080	
December 5	11:00 am	at Miami (FL)*	No. 3	Miami Orange Bowl; Miami, FL (College GameDay)	ESPN	L 45–49	46,819	
January 1	1:30 pm	vs. No. 9 Wisconsin*	No. 6	Rose Bowl; Pasadena, CA (Rose Bowl)	ABC	L 31–38	93,872	
*Non-conference game; ^{†}Homecoming; Rankings from AP Poll released prior to the game; All times are in Pacific time

== Rankings ==
Ranking movements Legend: ██ Increase in ranking ██ Decrease in ranking ( ) = First-place votes
	Week															
Poll	Pre	1	2	3	4	5	6	7	8	9	10	11	12	13	14	Final
AP	7 (1)	6 (1)	4 (1)	3 (1)	4 (1)	3 (1)	2 (1)	2 (1)	2 (1)	3 (1)	3 (4)	3 (4)	3 (4)	3 (3)	6	8
Coaches Poll	7 (3)	6 (1)	5 (1)	5 (1)	4 (1)	3 (1)	2 (1)	2 (1)	2 (1)	4 (1)	3 (7)	3 (7)	3 (7)	3	5	8
BCS	Not released								1	3	2	2	2	2	5	Not released

== Game summaries ==
=== Texas ===
Texas vs. UCLA

Team	1	2	3	4	Total
#23 Texas	3	0	7	21	31
• #6 UCLA	21	14	7	7	49

- Date: September 12, 1998
- Location: Rose Bowl
  Pasadena, California
- Game start: 12:30 PM PST
- Game attendance: 73,070
- Television network: ABC

=== Houston ===
UCLA vs. Houston

Team	1	2	3	4	Total
• #4 UCLA	0	21	14	7	42
Houston	6	8	7	3	24

- Date: September 19, 1998
- Location: Robertson Stadium
  Houston, Texas
- Game attendance: 19,540

=== Washington State ===
Washington State vs. UCLA

Team	1	2	3	4	Total
Washington State	0	10	0	7	17
• #4 UCLA	21	14	7	7	49

- Date: October 3, 1998
- Location: Rose Bowl
  Pasadena, California
- Game attendance: 67,210

=== Arizona ===
UCLA vs. Arizona

Team	1	2	3	4	Total
• #3 UCLA	7	14	10	21	52
#10 Arizona	14	7	7	0	28

- Date: October 10, 1998
- Location: Arizona Stadium
  Tucson, Arizona
- Game attendance: 58,738
- Television network: ABC

=== Oregon ===
Oregon vs. UCLA

Team	1	2	3	4	OT	Total
#11 Oregon	7	7	10	14	0	38
• #2 UCLA	14	10	0	14	3	41

- Date: October 17, 1998
- Location: Rose Bowl
  Pasadena, California
- Game attendance: 75,967

Scoring summary
Q1	UCLA	DeShaun Foster 51 yard pass from Cade McNown (Chris Sailer kick)	UCLA 7–0
Q1	UCLA	DeShaun Foster 4 yard run (Chris Sailer kick)	UCLA 14–0
Q1	ORE	Jed Weaver 20 yard pass from Akili Smith (Nathan Villegas kick)	UCLA 14–7
Q2	UCLA	Chris Sailer 25 yard field goal	UCLA 17–7
Q2	UCLA	Danny Farmer 6 yard pass from Cade McNown (Chris Sailer kick)	UCLA 24–7
Q2	ORE	Akili Smith 2 yard run (Nathan Villegas kick)	UCLA 24–14
Q3	ORE	Reuben Droughns 8 yard run (Nathan Villegas kick)	UCLA 24–21
Q3	ORE	Nathan Villegas 27 yard field goal	Tie 24–24
Q4	ORE	Tony Hartley 36 yard pass from Akili Smith (Nathan Villegas kick)	ORE 31–24
Q4	UCLA	Jermaine Lewis 2 yard run (Chris Sailer kick)	Tie 31–31
Q4	UCLA	Danny Farmer 60 yard pass from Cade McNown (Chris Sailer kick)	UCLA 38–31
Q4	ORE	Damon Griffin 2 yard pass from Akili SMith (Nathan Villegas kick)	Tie 38–38
OT	UCLA	Chris Sailer 24 yard field goal	UCLA 41–38

=== California ===
UCLA vs. California

Team	1	2	3	4	Total
• #2 UCLA	14	7	0	7	28
California	7	2	7	0	16

- Date: October 24, 1998
- Location: California Memorial Stadium
  Berkeley, California
- Game attendance: 55,000

Scoring summary
Q1	12:52	CAL	Muhammad 2 yard run (Brache kick)	CAL 7–0
Q1	6:36	UCLA	Poli-Dixon 17 yard pass from McNown (Sailer kick)	Tie 7–7
Q1	3:26	UCLA	Poli-Dixon 35 yard pass from McNown (Sailer kick)	UCLA 14–7
Q2	11:45	CAL	Safety, Sanyika tackled Price in end zone	UCLA 14–9
Q2	3:22	UCLA	Lewis 13 yard run (Sailer kick)	UCLA 21–9
Q3	:36	CAL	Young 2 yard pass from Vedder (Brache kick)	UCLA 21–16
Q4	13:53	UCLA	Dubravac 30 yard pass from Lewis (Sailer kick)	UCLA 28–16

=== Stanford ===
Stanford vs. UCLA

Team	1	2	3	4	Total
Stanford	7	7	10	0	24
• #2 UCLA	7	7	0	14	28

- Date: October 31, 1998
- Location: Rose Bowl
  Pasadena, California
- Game attendance: 64,820

=== Oregon State ===
UCLA vs. Oregon State

Team	1	2	3	4	Total
• #3 UCLA	0	17	7	17	41
Oregon State	0	10	14	10	34

- Date: November 7, 1998
- Location: Parker Stadium
  Corvallis, Oregon
- Game attendance: 26,017

=== Washington ===
UCLA vs. Washington

Team	1	2	3	4	Total
• #3 UCLA	13	7	6	10	36
Washington	3	7	7	7	24

- Date: November 14, 1998
- Location: Husky Stadium
  Seattle
- Game attendance: 72,391

=== USC ===
USC vs. UCLA
(Victory Bell)

Team	1	2	3	4	Total
USC	3	7	7	0	17
• #3 UCLA	14	13	0	7	34

- Date: November 21, 1998
- Location: Rose Bowl
  Pasadena, California
- Game attendance: 88,080

Eight straight wins against the Trojans.

=== Miami (FL) ===
UCLA vs. Miami

Team	1	2	3	4	Total
#3 UCLA	7	10	21	7	45
• Miami	14	7	7	21	49

- Date: December 5, 1998
- Location: Orange Bowl
  Miami
- Game attendance: 46,819

=== Wisconsin (Rose Bowl) ===
Wisconsin vs. UCLA
(Rose Bowl)

Team	1	2	3	4	Total
• #9 Badgers	7	17	7	7	38
#6 UCLA	7	14	7	3	31

- Date: January 1, 1999
- Location: Rose Bowl
  Pasadena, California
- Game start: 12:30 PST
- Game attendance: 93,872
- Game weather: 74 °F (23 °C), Sunny
- TV announcers (ABC): Keith Jackson and Bob Griese

Scoring summary
1	WIS	Ron Dayne 54-yard run (Matt Davenport kick)	WIS 7–0
1	UCLA	Jermaine Lewis 38-yard pass from Cade McNown (Chris Sailer kick)	Tied 7–7
2	WIS	Dayne 7-yard run (Davenport kick)	WIS 14–7
2	UCLA	Durell Price 61-yard pass from Freddie Mitchell (Sailer kick)	Tied 14–14
2	UCLA	Danny Farmer 41-yard pass from McNown (Sailer kick)	UCLA 21–14
2	WIS	Dayne 10-yard run (Davenport kick)	Tied 21–21
2	WIS	Davenport 40-yard field goal	Tied 24–21
3	WIS	Dayne 22-yard run (Davenport kick)	WIS 31–21
3	UCLA	Lewis 10-yard run (Sailer kick)	WIS 31–28
4	WIS	Jamar Fletcher 46-yard interception return (Davenport kick)	WIS 38–28
4	UCLA	UCLA – Sailer 30-yard field goal	WIS 38–31

== Roster ==
1998 UCLA Bruins football team roster
Players
Coaches
Offense

Pos.	#	Name	Class
QB	11	Drew Bennett	So
WR	87	Danny Farmer	Jr
OT	71	Kris Farris	Sr
RB	26	DeShaun Foster	Fr
QB	18	Cade McNown	Sr
WR	3	Freddie Mitchell	Fr
TE	40	Ryan Neufeld	Sr
FB	39	Craig Walendy	Sr

Defense

Pos.	#	Name	Class
LB	48	Ali Abdul Azziz	Jr
CB	20	Damian Allen	So
S	7	Marques Anderson	Fr
CB	35	Larry Atkins	Sr
LB	50	Brendon Ayanbadejo	Sr
CB	12	Jason Bell	So
DT	99	Kenyon Coleman	Sr
FS	27	Tod McBride	Sr
LB	47	Ryan Nece	Fr

Special teams

Pos.	#	Name	Class
LS	58	Jeff Grau	Fr

Head coach

- Bob Toledo

Coordinators/assistant coaches

Legend

- (C) Team captain
- (S) Suspended
- (I) Ineligible
- Injured
- Redshirt

Roster
Last update: 1998-09-28

== 1999 NFL draft ==
The following players were selected in the 1999 NFL draft.

Player	Round	Pick	Position	NFL team
Cade McNown	1	12	Quarterback	Chicago Bears
Kris Farris	3	74	Tackle	Pittsburgh Steelers
Larry Atkins	3	84	Outside Linebacker	Kansas City Chiefs
