= 1998 Arizona Wildcats football team =

American college football season

1998 Arizona Wildcats football

Holiday Bowl champion

Holiday Bowl, W 23–20 vs. Nebraska
- Conference: Pacific-10 Conference

Ranking
- Coaches: No. 4
- AP: No. 4
- Record: 12–1 (7–1 Pac-10)
- Head coach: Dick Tomey (12th season)
- Offensive coordinator: Dino Babers (1st season)
- Offensive scheme: Spread
- Defensive coordinator: Rich Ellerson (2nd season)
- Base defense: 4–3
- Home stadium: Arizona Stadium

1998 Pacific-10 Conference football standings
	Conf.			Overall
Team	W		L	W		L
No. 8 UCLA $	8	–	0	10	–	2
No. 4 Arizona	7	–	1	12	–	1
Oregon	5	–	3	8	–	4
USC	5	–	3	8	–	5
Washington	4	–	4	6	–	6
Arizona State	4	–	4	5	–	6
California	3	–	5	5	–	6
Oregon State	2	–	6	5	–	6
Stanford	2	–	6	3	–	8
Washington State	0	–	8	3	–	8
$ – BCS representative as conference champion; Rankings from AP Poll

The 1998 Arizona Wildcats football team represented the University of Arizona as a member of the Pacific-10 Conference (Pac-10) during the 1998 NCAA Division I-A football season. Led by head coach Dick Tomey in his 12th season, the Wildcats captured a 12–1 record (7–1 against Pac-10 opponents) during the year. It was Arizona's first 11-or-more-win season in school history and the best record to date, which surpassed the 1993 team's record of ten wins. A loss to UCLA in the middle of the regular season prevented the Wildcats from earning an outright Pac-10 title and a potential spot in the Rose Bowl. The team appeared in the Holiday Bowl, and defeating Nebraska to complete the season.

== Schedule ==
Date	Time	Opponent	Rank	Site	TV	Result	Attendance	Source
September 3	8:00 p.m.	at Hawaii*	No. 24	Aloha Stadium; Halawa, HI	ESPN2	W 27–6	38,745	
September 12	12:30 p.m.	at Stanford	No. 21	Stanford Stadium; Stanford, CA	FSN	W 31–14	30,096	
September 19	7:00 p.m.	Iowa*	No. 16	Arizona Stadium; Tucson, AZ	FSN	W 35–11	52,634	
September 24	5:00 p.m.	at San Diego State*	No. 16	Qualcomm Stadium; San Diego, CA	ESPN	W 35–16	23,811	
October 3	7:00 p.m.	at No. 20 Washington	No. 14	Husky Stadium; Seattle, WA	FSN	W 31–28	71,469	
October 10	7:15 p.m.	No. 3 UCLA	No. 10	Arizona Stadium; Tucson, AZ	FSN	L 28–52	58,738	
October 17	1:00 p.m.	at Oregon State	No. 16	Parker Stadium; Corvallis, OR	FSN	W 28–7	30,231	
October 24	7:00 p.m.	Northeast Louisiana*	No. 14	Arizona Stadium; Tucson, AZ	KTTU	W 45–7	39,218	
October 31	4:30 p.m.	No. 12 Oregon	No. 13	Arizona Stadium; Tucson, AZ	FSN	W 38–3	44,931	
November 7	7:00 p.m.	Washington State^{†}	No. 10	Arizona Stadium; Tucson, AZ	FSAZ	W 41–7	47,761	
November 14	4:30 p.m.	at California	No. 9	California Memorial Stadium; Berkeley, CA	FSN	W 27–23	36,500	
November 27	4:30 p.m.	Arizona State	No. 7	Arizona Stadium; Tucson, AZ (rivalry)	FSN	W 50–42	57,953	
December 30	6:00 p.m.	vs. No. 14 Nebraska*	No. 5	Qualcomm Stadium; San Diego, CA (Holiday Bowl)	ESPN	W 23–20	65,354	
*Non-conference game; ^{†}Homecoming; Rankings from AP Poll released prior to the game; All times are in Mountain time

== Rankings ==
Ranking movements Legend: ██ Increase in ranking ██ Decrease in ranking
	Week															
Poll	Pre	1	2	3	4	5	6	7	8	9	10	11	12	13	14	Final
AP	24	21	16	16	14	10	16	14	13	10	9	8	7	6	5	4
Coaches Poll	25	21	17	16	14	11	17	16	15	11	10	8	7	6	6	4
BCS	Not released								14	10	10	8	7	6	7	Not released

== Before the season ==
Arizona finished the 1997 season with a 7–5 record and won the Insight.com Bowl over New Mexico (an old rival of the Wildcats) that was played at the Wildcats' home field. The offense improved late in the season and concluded the year on a winning streak. Soon after the season ended, offensive coordinator Homer Smith announced his retirement for health reasons and Arizona had to get a new coordinator to build the offense. During the offseason, Tomey believed that the late season surge by the team would motivate them for 1998.

With most of the offense returning along with several starters on defense, the Wildcats entered the preseason as contenders for the Pac-10 title and looked to improve on their 1997 record for more wins. They were also ranked in the top 25 polls for the first time since the 1995 season.

== Game summaries ==
=== Hawaii ===
To begin the season, the Wildcats traveled to Hawaii, where Tomey formerly coached prior to joining Arizona. The Wildcats returned the opening kickoff for a touchdown that would energize the team. The Rainbow Warriors would have no chance after that and Arizona did enough to get the victory.

=== Iowa ===
In the home opener, Arizona hosted Iowa. The Hawkeyes' defense played tough to start the year, but the Wildcats' offense would torch them all game long and Arizona got the win in front of a raucous crowd to go to 3–0 on the season for the first time since 1994.

=== Washington ===
On the road in Seattle, the Wildcats faced Washington in tough environment. Both teams would hang with each other in terms of scoring and by the fourth quarter, the Huskies took the lead and were poised to pull the upset. On Arizona's final drive, however, they would get closer to the end zone with a chance at survival. In the closing seconds, Wildcat quarterback Ortege Jenkins ran the ball, tried to dive into the end zone, took a low hit around the shin area and front flipped across the goal line for the game winning touchdown with 6 seconds left and Arizona remained unbeaten and won against Washington for the first time since their big upset over them in 1992.

=== UCLA ===
UCLA at. Arizona

Team	1	2	3	4	Total
• No. 3 Bruins	7	14	10	21	52
No. 10 Wildcats	14	7	7	0	28

- Date: October 10, 1998
- Location: Arizona Stadium
  Tucson, Arizona
- Game attendance: 58,738
- Television network: FSN

After winning a wild one at Washington, the Wildcats returned home for their next game against third-ranked UCLA, which was a big test for both teams. In a battle between two undefeated top ten teams (Arizona was ranked tenth) with the winner taking control of the Pac-10 at the time.

Arizona started would start off the game with an early 14–7 lead before the Bruins answered back. Both teams would trade scores back and forth, which led to the score tied at halftime. In the second half, the Wildcats regained the lead at 28–24 before UCLA took it back in the final minute of the quarter before the game turned around in the fourth.

In the final quarter, Arizona tried to respond, but would make turnovers that would lead to the Bruins scoring for good. More mistakes by Arizona led to another touchdown by the Bruins to break the game open and the Wildcats never recovered. With the 52–28 win, UCLA showed why they were in contention for a national championship and ended the Wildcats' chances at a perfect season, like they did in 1993.

=== Oregon ===
On Halloween, 13th-ranked Arizona hosted Oregon. It seemed that Tucson would be a scary place for the 12th-ranked Ducks (due to the game being played on Halloween) as the Wildcats would dominate in all phases and cruised to a win.

=== California ===
Arizona, ranked ninth, visited Berkeley for a game against a struggling Golden Bears team. The game would be close, but the Wildcats would ultimately survive an upset bid from Cal to earn their tenth victory, which tied the 1993 team's record for most wins in a single season. The win also avenged Arizona's four-overtime loss to the Bears in their previous trip to Berkeley in 1996.

=== Arizona State ===
Arizona State at #7 Arizona

Team	1	2	3	4	Total
Sun Devils	15	7	6	14	42
• No. 7 Wildcats	7	19	17	7	50

- Date: November 27
- Location: Arizona Stadium, Tucson, Arizona
- Game attendance: 57,953
- Source: USA Today

Scoring summary
1	11:14	ASU	Stephen Baker 26-yard field goal	ASU 3–0
1	10:56	ARIZ	Brad Brennan 72-yard pass from Keith Smith (Mark McDonald kick)	ARIZ 7–3
1	6:59	ASU	Jeff Paulk 1-yard run (kick failed)	ASU 9–7
1	3:22	ASU	Craig Spann 14-yard pass from Ryan Kealy (two-point failed)	ASU 15–7
2	10:47	ARIZ	Jim Wendler 1-yard run (two-point failed)	ASU 15–13
2	4:11	ARIZ	Scooter Sprotte 12-yard fumble return (two-point failed)	ARIZ 19–15
2	1:50	ASU	J.R. Redmond 2-yard run (Stephen Baker kick)	ASU 22–19
2	1:37	ARIZ	Trung Canidate 80-yard run (Mark McDonald kick)	ARIZ 26–22
3	11:38	ARIZ	Ortege Jenkins 13-yard run (Mark McDonald kick)	ARIZ 33–22
3	9:23	ASU	Todd Heap 23-yard pass from Ryan Kealy (two-point failed)	ARIZ 33–28
3	4:58	ARIZ	Mark McDonald 21-yard field goal	ARIZ 36–28
3	1:35	ARIZ	Trung Canidate 66-yard run (Mark McDonald kick)	ARIZ 43–28
4	5:55	ASU	Todd Heap 17-yard pass from Ryan Kealy (Stephen Baker kick)	ARIZ 43–35
4	4:02	ARIZ	Trung Canidate 48-yard run (Mark McDonald kick)	ARIZ 50–35
4	1:52	ASU	Lenzie Jackson 23-yard pass from Ryan Kealy (Stephen Baker kick)	ARIZ 50–42

The Wildcats entered the "Duel in the Desert" against Arizona State looking for their eleventh win. The Sun Devils led for most of the first half before Arizona running back Trung Canidate broke off an 80-yard touchdown run to put the Wildcats ahead before halftime.

In the second half, Arizona seemingly took control before ASU cut into the Wildcat lead. Canidate would add a pair of long rushing touchdowns as the Wildcats began to pull away with a 50–35 lead. Arizona State would later score a touchdown to get within eight. After stopping the Wildcats, the Devils had one last chance in the closing minute. Needing a touchdown and a two-point conversion to force overtime, ASU threw a pass toward the end zone that would fall incomplete as time expired, and Arizona captured their 11th win that broke the record of ten set in 1993. Canidate rushed for 288 yards, which broke the single-game Arizona record held by Jim Upchurch's 232 yards against UTEP in 1973.

=== Nebraska (Holiday Bowl) ===
Nebraska vs Arizona

Team	1	2	3	4	Total
No. 14 Cornhuskers	0	13	0	7	20
• No. 5 Wildcats	6	3	0	14	23

- Date: December 30
- Location: Qualcomm Stadium, San Diego
- Game attendance: 65,354

After beating Arizona State, the Wildcats waited for a bowl berth. With UCLA already clinching the Pac-10 title and being unbeaten, they would collapse against Miami, which ended their quest for a national title and prevented Arizona from possibly going to the Rose Bowl as an at-large team. As a result, the Wildcats were invited to the Holiday Bowl against Nebraska and the Bruins went to the Rose Bowl.

Nebraska came into the Holiday Bowl a year after winning a share of the national championship and longtime coach Tom Osborne retiring afterwards. Arizona believed that they had a chance against the Cornhuskers despite Nebraska having a new coach.

In the bowl game, Arizona would open the scoring with three field goals before Nebraska responded with 13 unanswered points to lead at the half. After neither team scored in the third quarter, the Wildcats retook the lead in the fourth. The Cornhuskers would answer back to grab a 20–16 lead. Arizona would then drive down the field to regain the lead at 23–20 with over four minutes remaining. Nebraska tried to come back, but the Wildcats would intercept them. Arizona then ran out the clock and ended the season with their 12th win.

== Roster ==
1998 Arizona Wildcats football team roster
Players
Coaches
Offense

Pos.	#	Name	Class
RB	30	Trung Canidate	So
WR	89	Sy'Gerry Cook	Sr
TE	88	Mike Lucky	Sr
OL	78	Mike Mannelly	Sr
TE	90	Brandon Manumaleuna	Fr
WR	15	Jeremy McDaniel	Sr
OL	71	Marques McFadden	Fr
OL	79	Edwin Mulitalo	Jr
WR	8	Dennis Northcutt	So
RB	34	Kevin Schmidtke	Sr
G	72	Yusuf Scott	So
TE	32	Paul Shields	Jr
QB	12	Keith Smith	So

Defense

Pos.	#	Name	Class
LB	40	Marcus Bell	So
DT	48	Daniel Greer	Jr
CB	11	Chris McAlister	Jr
LB	31	DaShon Polk	So
DT	56	Joe Salave'a	Sr
LB	42	Jimmy Sprotte	Sr
FS	6	Scooter Sprotte	Jr
LB	44	Mike Szlauko	Sr
DE	99	Joseph Tafoya	Fr
DT	95	Todd Thompson	Jr

Special teams

Pos.	#	Name	Class

Head coach

- Dick Tomey

Coordinators/assistant coaches

Legend

- (C) Team captain
- (S) Suspended
- (I) Ineligible
- Injured
- Redshirt

Roster

== Awards and honors ==
- Trung Canidate, RB, First-team All-Pac-10
- Chris McAlister, CB, Consensus and AP All-American, First-team All-Pac-10
- Yusuf Scott, OL, Pac-10 Morris Trophy winner (offense), First-team All-Pac-10
- Marcus Bell, LB, First-team All-Pac-10
- Edwin Mulitalo, OL, First-team All-Pac-10
- Daniel Greer, DB, First-team All-Pac-10
- DaShon Polk, LB, Second-team All-Pac-10
- Keith Smith, QB, Second-team All-Pac-10
- Jeremy McDaniel, WR, Second-team All-Pac-10

== Season notes ==
- Arizona played twelve games in the regular season for the first time since 1977.
- The Wildcats began the season by returning the opening kickoff for a touchdown against Hawaii. They would not return another kickoff for a score again until 2009.
- The Wildcats opened the year with two consecutive road games for the first time since 1973.
- The Arizona Stadium field changed yet again, as the "Block 'A'" and "Bear Down" were now smaller and were on each 25-yard line and there was no logo at midfield (the 50-yard line). The "Bear Down" returned to being in blue letters after it was in red in 1997.
- After beating Iowa at home, Arizona did not face the Hawkeyes again until 2009. Also, they would not beat both Arizona State and Oregon at home again until 2004 and 2007 respectively, and Oregon State until 2005.
- This was the last time that Arizona would defeat Washington under Tomey, as he would resign in 2000 and the Wildcats next defeated the Huskies with a different coach in 2003 and would not win in Seattle again until 2004.
- The game-winning touchdown against Washington was known to Wildcat fans as the "Leap by the Lake", referencing Jenkins' flip across the end zone and Husky Stadium being located near Lake Washington. Fans often rated the play as the second greatest moment in Arizona football history behind Chuck Cecil's interception return touchdown against Arizona State in 1986 as well as the team's second biggest win over the Huskies behind their upset victory in 1992.
- There were rumors that the Arizona–UCLA game was going to feature ESPN's College GameDay visiting Tucson and the game to be aired in prime-time on ABC. However, GameDay visited Tennessee–Georgia as it was a bigger matchup (Tennessee would win that game and ultimately the national championship) and ABC aired a late afternoon game between Notre Dame and Arizona, with Arizona–UCLA airing on FSN due to it being broadcast late at 7:00 p.m. PT. GameDay did involve Arizona in the 1999 season opener and it wouldn't be until 2009 that it would come to Arizona's campus.
- The loss to UCLA proved to be the only one for the Wildcats in the season. The Bruins had also given Arizona a first loss in 1993 and would do so again in 2015, leading to fans referring to UCLA as "the team that ends Arizona's unbeaten chances". The loss would also prevent Arizona from finishing the year with a perfect record for the first time in modern history and likely kept them from possibly playing for the national championship.
- This would be the only year where Arizona played Northeast Louisiana (now known as Louisiana–Monroe).
- The win over California was the first time that the two teams did not play in overtime since the extra time period was introduced in 1996. Both Arizona and California played overtime in 1996–97 and split the two (the Wildcats won the 1997 game).
- Arizona's 50 points against Arizona State was the most scored against their rivals since 1954 when they scored 54.
- Canidate's 288 school-record yards rushing against ASU would later be broken in 2012 by Ka'Deem Carey's 366 yards against Colorado.
- The win over ASU would be Tomey's last over them, as he would not defeat them again before stepping down in 2000.
- This season would be the biggest near-miss at the Rose Bowl for the Wildcats, as they watched UCLA blow a big lead against Miami that would have sent the Bruins to the national title game (the Fiesta Bowl) and Arizona to Pasadena for the very first time.
- Arizona would play at a stadium twice this season, as they played at San Diego State and the Holiday Bowl at the same stadium. It was the first time since 1993 that the Wildcats played two games at the same stadium, when they played back-to-back games in Tempe (ASU in the regular season finale and the Fiesta Bowl against Miami).
- This was Arizona's first Holiday Bowl. They would not return to the bowl again until 2009, where, coincidentally, they would play Nebraska again and would ultimately lose.
- The Wildcats' explosive offense in 1998 was referred to as the "Desert Storm" by a 1999 newspaper article looking back at the prior season. Similarly, the Wildcats powerful defenses of 1992-1994 were referred to as "Desert Swarm". While "Desert Swarm" was widely accepted and used as a moniker for the defense by the fans and media alike, and marketed by the school, "Desert Storm" was never widely accepted or used to refer to the offense. ("Desert Storm" was originally a moniker given to the U.S. military operation during the 1991 Gulf War).
- Jenkins, Canidate, along with quarterback Keith Smith and wide receivers Dennis Northcutt and Jeremy McDaniel led the offense, while the defense was led by cornerback and kick returner Chris McAlister, who wreaked havoc on opposing offenses (McAlister was the one who returned the opening kickoff for a touchdown against Hawaii to start the year and was the only player to return a kickoff, punt and interception for a score in the same season). All of them were huge factors in the Wildcats' 12–1 record. Both Jenkins and Smith were part of the Wildcats' two-way quarterback system that began in 1997 and would continue until 1999 when Smith graduated. Most of them earned all-Pac-10 honors in this season.
- Had Arizona finished the season with a perfect record and won the Pac-10 title and either the Rose Bowl or national title, Canidate and McAlister would have likely won at least a share of the conference's offensive and defensive player of the year awards respectively and Tomey would have also won the Pac-10 coach of the year as well. McAlister would have also won major defensive awards as well.
- This was the first and only season in which Arizona finished ranked in the BCS polls. They would not finish a season as a ranked team again until 2014.
- This was only Arizona's second ten-win season in program history, which joined the 1993 team (10–2 record that year). The twelve wins this season remain a school record to this day and many fans refer to the 1998 team as the greatest in Wildcat football history.
- After the season, Arizona torn down their scoreboard behind the north end zone and replaced it with a new dynamic one for 1999.

== After the season ==
Arizona attempted to build on the success of the 1998 season by contending for both the Rose Bowl and a potential national title in 1999, but would falter during that season and would begin an era of futility for the program and led to Tomey resigning after the 2000 season. As a result, the Wildcats would not finish with both another winning record or bowl appearance until 2008.

== Team players drafted into the NFL ==
Player	Position	Round	Pick	NFL club
Chris McAlister	Cornerback	1	10	Baltimore Ravens
Edwin Mulitalo	Guard	4	129	Baltimore Ravens
Ronnie Smith	Defensive back	5	168	Arizona Cardinals
Mike Lucky	Tight end	7	229	Dallas Cowboys
