= Blane Morgan =

American football player and coach (born 1977)

Biographical details
- Born: 1977 (age 48–49); Nacogdoches, Texas, U.S.

Playing career
- 1996–1998: Air Force
- Position: Quarterback

Coaching career (HC unless noted)
- 2003–2004: Air Force (assistant)
- 2005–2006: Air Force (WR)
- 2007–2014: Air Force (co-OC/QB)
- 2015–2019: San Diego State (QB)
- 2020–2022: Lamar

Head coaching record
- Overall: 5–23

Accomplishments and honors

Awards
- WAC Pacific Division Offensive Player of the Year (1998); All-WAC (1998); Second-team All-WAC (1997)

Blane Morgan (born 1977) is an American college football coach and former player. He was most recently the head football coach at Lamar University, a position he held from 2020 until 2022. Morgan played as a quarterback at the United States Air Force Academy.

== Early years ==
Morgan attended Trinity Christian Academy, where he was coached by his father, Barry. He played safety, until being named the starter at quarterback as a junior, after his brother, Beau, graduated. He also remained the starter at strong safety, earning all-state honrs at both positions. He was a member of four state finalist teams that won three state championships in his four years, the last two led by him at quarterback.

== College career ==
Morgan followed his brother and accepted a football scholarship from the United States Air Force Academy. He saw no varsity playing time during his freshman season, playing instead for the program's junior varsity team.

As a sophomore, he was the fourth-string quarterback, tallying 11 carries for 56 yards.

As a junior, he was named the starter at quarterback after his brother, Beau graduated. He posted 63 of 123 completions for 975 yards, 4 passing touchdowns, 192 carries for 565 yards and 6 rushing touchdowns. He led the team to a 10–3 record. The Falcons were invited to play in the 1997 Las Vegas Bowl, where they lost to Oregon, 41–13.

As a senior, he posted 61 of 112 completions for 1,144 yards, 10 passing touchdowns, 145 carries for 508 yards and 15 rushing touchdowns. He led the team to a 12–1 record and the school's first outright Western Athletic Conference (WAC) title. The Falcons were invited to the 1998 Oahu Bowl, where they won 43–25 over the Washington Huskies.

Morgan won 20 out of the 23 games he started, which is the best record and the highest winning percentage (.870) for a starting quarterback in school history. The 22 total games the team won is a school record over a two-year period. He posted a 3–0 record against the other military service academies. His senior year, Air Force was almost undefeated losing by one point to TCU in a game where Morgan was injusred and unable to play the second half. That year, Air Force finished ranked 10th (USA Today ESPN Coaches Poll) and 13th (AP) in the final polls.

=== Statistics ===
Year	Team	Games			Passing								Rushing			
Year	Team	GP	GS	Record	Comp	Att	Pct	Yards	Avg	TD	Int	Rate	Att	Yards	Avg	TD
1995	Air Force	Did not play														
1996	Air Force	4	0	—	0	0	0.0	0	0.0	0	0	0.0	11	56	5.1	0
1997	Air Force	12	12	10−2	63	123	51.2	975	7.9	4	6	118.8	192	565	2.9	6
1998	Air Force	11	11	10−1	61	112	54.5	1,144	10.2	10	4	162.6	145	508	3.5	15
Career		27	23	20−3	124	235	52.8	2,119	9.0	14	10	139.7	348	1,129	3.2	21

== Coaching career ==
In 1999, he was a graduate assistant at the United States Air Force Academy. From 2000 to 2003, he fulfilled his military obligation at Laughlin Air Force Base.

From 2003 to 2004, he was a football assistant for the varsity and junior varsity team at the United States Air Force Academy. From 2005 to 2006, he was the wide receivers coach. From 2007 to 2014, he was the co-offensive coordinator and quarterbacks coach. During this period of time, the school posted a 59–44 (.573) overall record, including seven bowl game appearances (.750 record in those games), two nine-win campaigns and one ten-win season. In 2011, the team set a school single-season record by scoring 454 points, finishing second all-time in program history in completion percentage (60.3), third in rushing touchdowns (43) and fourth in passing touchdowns (16).

From 2015 to 2019, he was the quarterbacks coach at San Diego State University. During this period of time, the school recorded a 48–18 (.727) overall record, including five Bowl game appearances (.500 record in those games), two 11-win campaigns, one 10-win season, and two Mountain West Conference championships.

On December 12, 2019, he was named the football head coach at Lamar University, becoming the school's 10th head coach since transitioning into a four-year institution. With one year remaining on his contract, Morgan left the Lamar program at the end of the 2022 season. His overall record for his three years at Lamar was 5-23. His teams compiled a 3-16 record in conference play.

== Head coaching record ==
Year	Team	Overall	Conference	Standing	Bowl/playoffs
Lamar Cardinals (Southland Conference) (2020–2021)
2020–21	Lamar	2–4	2–4	T–5th	
Lamar Cardinals (Western Athletic Conference) (2021)
2021	Lamar	2–9	0–7	6th	
Lamar Cardinals (Southland Conference) (2022)
2022	Lamar	1–10	1–5	T–7th	
Lamar:		5–23	3–16		
Total:		5–23			
