= 1998 Oregon Ducks football team =

American college football season

1998 Oregon Ducks football

Aloha Bowl, L 43–51 vs. Colorado
- Conference: Pacific-10 Conference
- Record: 8–4 (5–3 Pac-10)
- Head coach: Mike Bellotti (4th season)
- Offensive coordinator: Jeff Tedford (1st season)
- Offensive scheme: Pro-style
- Defensive coordinator: Bob Foster (1st season)
- Base defense: 4–3
- Captain: Game captains
- Home stadium: Autzen Stadium

1998 Pacific-10 Conference football standings
| | Conf. | | | Overall |
| Team | W | | L | W | | L |
|---|---|---|---|---|---|---|
| No. 8 UCLA $ | 8 | – | 0 | 10 | – | 2 |
| No. 4 Arizona | 7 | – | 1 | 12 | – | 1 |
| Oregon | 5 | – | 3 | 8 | – | 4 |
| USC | 5 | – | 3 | 8 | – | 5 |
| Washington | 4 | – | 4 | 6 | – | 6 |
| Arizona State | 4 | – | 4 | 5 | – | 6 |
| California | 3 | – | 5 | 5 | – | 6 |
| Oregon State | 2 | – | 6 | 5 | – | 6 |
| Stanford | 2 | – | 6 | 3 | – | 8 |
| Washington State | 0 | – | 8 | 3 | – | 8 |
$ – BCS representative as conference champion; Rankings from AP Poll

The 1998 Oregon Ducks football team represented the University of Oregon as a member of the Pacific-10 Conference (Pac-10) during the 1998 NCAA Division I-A football season. Led by fourth-year head coach Mike Bellotti, the Ducks compiled an overall record of 8–4 with a mark of 5–3 in conference play, tying for third place in the Pac-10. Oregon was invited to the Aloha Bowl, where the Ducks lost to Colorado. The team played home games at Autzen Stadium in Eugene, Oregon.

== Schedule ==
| Date | Time | Opponent | Rank | Site | TV | Result | Attendance |
|---|---|---|---|---|---|---|---|
| September 5 | 12:30 pm | No. 23 Michigan State* | | Autzen Stadium; Eugene, OR | ABC | W 48–14 | 43,634 |
| September 12 | 5:30 pm | at UTEP* | No. 24 | Sun Bowl; El Paso, TX | OSN | W 33–26 | 25,906 |
| September 19 | 2:00 pm | San Jose State* | No. 22 | Autzen Stadium; Eugene, OR | | W 58–3 | 41,868 |
| September 26 | 1:00 pm | Stanford | No. 20 | Autzen Stadium; Eugene, OR (rivalry) | FSNNW | W 63–28 | 43,948 |
| October 10 | 2:00 pm | at Washington State | No. 15 | Martin Stadium; Pullman, WA | | W 51–29 | 37,196 |
| October 17 | 12:30 pm | at No. 2 UCLA | No. 11 | Rose Bowl; Pasadena, CA (College GameDay) | ABC | L 38–41 ^{OT} | 75,367 |
| October 24 | 3:30 pm | USC | No. 12 | Autzen Stadium; Eugene, OR (rivalry) | FSN | W 17–13 | 45,807 |
| October 31 | 3:30 pm | at No. 13 Arizona | No. 12 | Arizona Stadium; Tucson, AZ | FSN | L 3–38 | 44,931 |
| November 7 | 12:30 pm | Washington | No. 21 | Autzen Stadium; Eugene, OR (rivalry) | ABC | W 27–22 | 46,031 |
| November 14 | 1:00 pm | Arizona State | No. 20 | Autzen Stadium; Eugene, OR | | W 51–19 | 43,723 |
| November 21 | 3:30 pm | at Oregon State | No. 15 | Parker Stadium; Corvallis, OR (Civil War) | FSN | L 41–44 ^{2OT} | 37,777 |
| December 25 | 12:30 pm | vs. Colorado* | No. 21 | Aloha Stadium; Halawa, HI (Aloha Bowl) | ABC | L 43–51 | 38,803 |
*Non-conference game; Rankings from AP Poll released prior to the game; All times are in Pacific time

== Rankings ==
Ranking movements Legend: ██ Increase in ranking ██ Decrease in ranking — = Not ranked RV = Received votes т = Tied with team above or below
| | Week | | | | | | | | | | | | | | | |
| Poll | Pre | 1 | 2 | 3 | 4 | 5 | 6 | 7 | 8 | 9 | 10 | 11 | 12 | 13 | 14 | Final |
|---|---|---|---|---|---|---|---|---|---|---|---|---|---|---|---|---|
| AP | RV | 24 | 22 | 20 | 17 | 15 | 11 | 12 | 12 | 21 | 20 | 15 | 22 | 21 | 21 | RV |
| Coaches | RV | RV | 23 | 21 | 17T | 16 | 12 | 14 | 13 | 20 | 19 | 16 | 23 | 21 | 21 | RV |
| BCS | Not released | | | | | | | | 11 | — | 14 | 11 | 18 | — | — | Not released |

== Game summaries ==
=== USC ===
USC at #14 Oregon

| Team | 1 | 2 | 3 | 4 | Total |
|---|---|---|---|---|---|
| USC | 0 | 10 | 0 | 3 | 13 |
| • Oregon | 0 | 3 | 7 | 7 | 17 |

- Date: Saturday, October 24
- Location: Autzen Stadium, Eugene, Oregon
- Game attendance: 45,807
- Television network: FSN
- Source: USA Today

Scoring summary
| 2 | 14:15 | ORE | Nathan Villegas 23-yard field goal | ORE 3-0 |
| 2 | 12:41 | USC | Chad Morton 70-yard pass from Mike Van Raaphorst (Adam Abrams kick) | USC 7-3 |
| 2 | 1:40 | USC | Adam Abrams 49-yard field goal | USC 10-3 |
| 3 | 10:24 | ORE | Tony Hartley 55-yard pass from Akili Smith (Nathan Villegas kick) | Tied 10-10 |
| 4 | 10:43 | ORE | Akili Smith 62-yard run (Nathan Villegas kick) | ORE 17-10 |
| 4 | 4:14 | USC | Adam Abrams 25-yard field goal | ORE 17-13 |

Oregon snapped a three-game losing streak to USC.

== Roster ==
1998 Oregon Ducks football team roster
Players
Coaches
Offense

| Pos. | # | Name | Class |
|---|---|---|---|
| QB | 3 | Joey Harrington | Fr |
| QB | 7 | A.J. Feeley | So |
| QB | 11 | Akili Smith | Sr |
| QB | | Jason Maas | Sr |
| RB | | Reuben Droughns | Jr |
| WR | | Damon Griffin | Sr |
| TE | | Jed Weaver |

Defense

| Pos. | # | Name | Class |
|---|---|---|---|
| DL | | Saul Patu | So |
| CB | 17 | Rashad Bauman | So |
| DB | | Michael Fletcher | Jr |
| DB | | Brandon McLemore |
| S | | Justin Wilcox | Jr |

Special teams

| Pos. | # | Name | Class |
|---|---|---|---|
| K | | Nathan Villegas |
| P | | Josh Bidwell | Sr |

Head coach

- Mike Bellotti

Coordinators/assistant coaches

- Jeff Tedford – Offensive coordinator
- Gary Campbell – Running backs
- Tom Osborne – Tight ends and special teams and recruiting coordinator
- Bob Foster – Defensive coordinator
- Don Pellum – Linebackers
- Bob Gregory – Defensive backs

Legend

- (C) Team captain
- (S) Suspended
- (I) Ineligible
- Injured
- Redshirt
