= Outland Trophy =

Award for the best college football interior lineman in the United States

- Awarded for: Best interior lineman in college football
- Country: United States
- Presented by: Football Writers Association of America

History
- First award: 1946
- Most recent: Utah offensive tackle Spencer Fano
- Website: sportswriters.net

The Outland Trophy is awarded to the best college football interior lineman in the United States as adjudged by the Football Writers Association of America. It is named after John H. Outland. One of only a few players ever to be named an All-American at two positions, Outland garnered consensus All-America honors in 1898 as a tackle and consensus honors as a halfback in 1899. Outland had always contended that football tackles and guards deserved greater recognition and conceived the Outland Trophy as a means of providing this recognition. In 1988, Jimmy Ridlon was commissioned to design and sculpt the Outland Trophy. A member of the National College Football Awards Association, the award has become one of college football's most prestigious.

== Winners ==
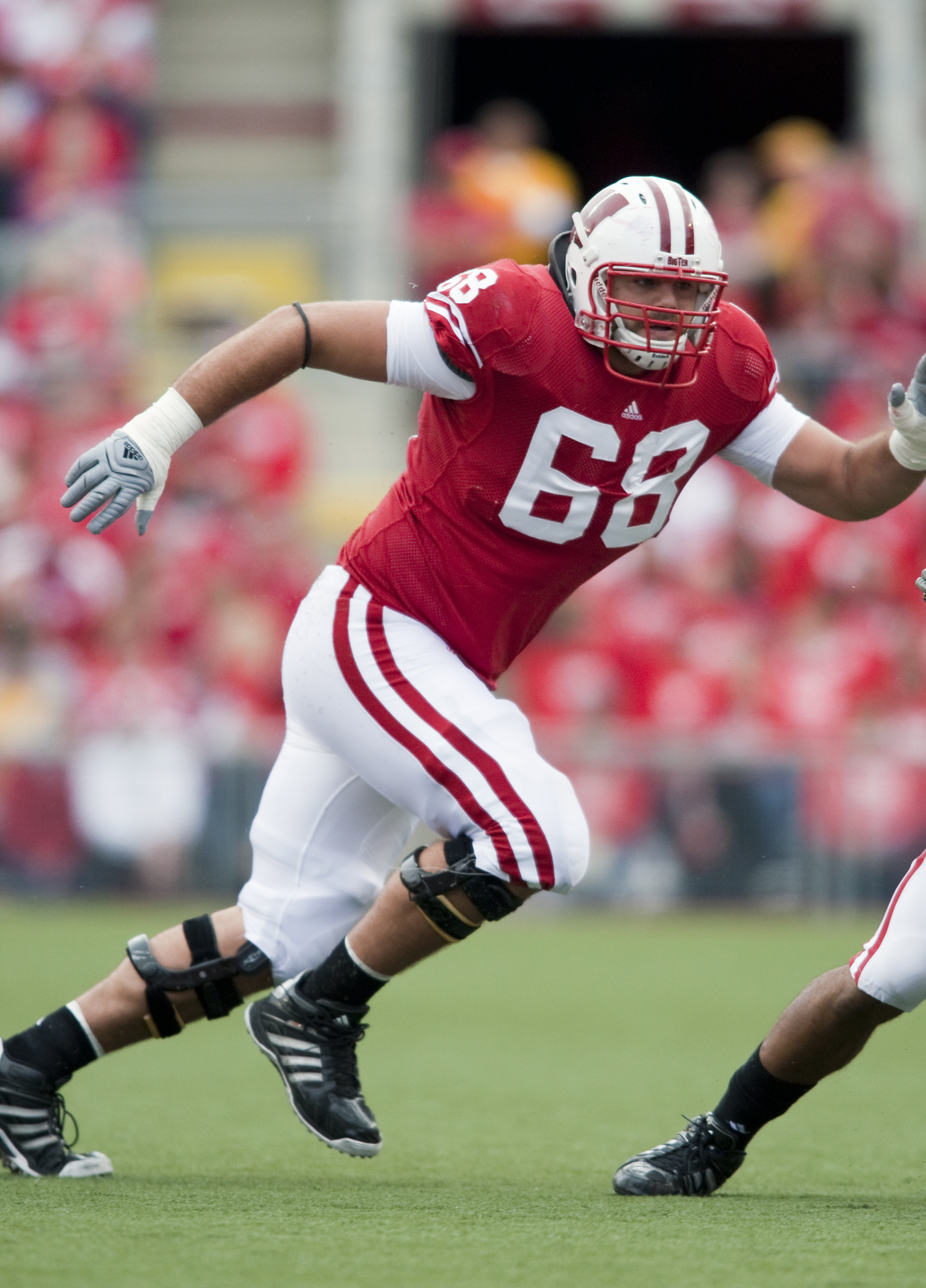
2010 winner Gabe Carimi

Year	Player	Position	School	Ref.
1946	George Connor	Tackle	Notre Dame	
1947	Joe Steffy	Guard	Army	
1948	Bill Fischer	Guard	Notre Dame (2)	
1949	Ed Bagdon	Guard	Michigan State	
1950	Bob Gain	Tackle	Kentucky	
1951	Jim Weatherall	Tackle	Oklahoma	
1952	Dick Modzelewski	Tackle	Maryland	
1953	J. D. Roberts	Guard	Oklahoma (2)	
1954	Bud Brooks	Guard	Arkansas	
1955	Cal Jones	Guard	Iowa	
1956	Jim Parker	Guard	Ohio State	
1957	Alex Karras	Tackle	Iowa (2)	
1958	Zeke Smith	Guard	Auburn	
1959	Mike McGee	Tackle	Duke	
1960	Tom Brown	Guard	Minnesota	
1961	Merlin Olsen	Tackle	Utah State	
1962	Bobby Bell	Tackle	Minnesota (2)	
1963	Scott Appleton	Tackle	Texas	
1964	Steve DeLong	Middle guard	Tennessee	
1965	Tommy Nobis	Guard	Texas (2)	
1966	Loyd Phillips	Defensive tackle	Arkansas (2)	
1967	Ron Yary	Offensive tackle	USC	
1968	Bill Stanfill	Defensive tackle	Georgia	
1969	Mike Reid	Defensive tackle	Penn State	
1970	Jim Stillwagon	Middle guard	Ohio State (2)	
1971	Larry Jacobson	Defensive tackle	Nebraska	
1972	Rich Glover	Middle guard	Nebraska (2)	
1973	John Hicks	Offensive tackle	Ohio State (3)	
1974	Randy White	Defensive tackle	Maryland (2)	
1975	Lee Roy Selmon	Defensive tackle	Oklahoma (3)	
1976	Ross Browner	Defensive end	Notre Dame (3)	
1977	Brad Shearer	Defensive tackle	Texas (3)	
1978	Greg Roberts	Guard	Oklahoma (4)	
1979	Jim Ritcher	Center	NC State	
1980	Mark May	Offensive tackle	Pittsburgh	
1981	Dave Rimington	Center	Nebraska (3)	
1982	Dave Rimington (2)	Center	Nebraska (4)	
1983	Dean Steinkuhler	Guard	Nebraska (5)	
1984	Bruce Smith	Defensive tackle	Virginia Tech	
1985	Mike Ruth	Middle guard	Boston College	
1986	Jason Buck	Defensive tackle	BYU	
1987	Chad Hennings	Defensive tackle	Air Force	
1988	Tracy Rocker	Defensive tackle	Auburn (2)	
1989	Mohammed Elewonibi	Guard	BYU (2)	
1990	Russell Maryland	Defensive tackle	Miami (FL)	
1991	Steve Emtman	Defensive tackle	Washington	
1992	Will Shields	Guard	Nebraska (6)	
1993	Rob Waldrop	Defensive tackle	Arizona	
1994	Zach Wiegert	Offensive tackle	Nebraska (7)	
1995	Jonathan Ogden	Offensive tackle	UCLA	
1996	Orlando Pace	Offensive tackle	Ohio State (4)	
1997	Aaron Taylor	Guard	Nebraska (8)	
1998	Kris Farris	Offensive tackle	UCLA (2)	
1999	Chris Samuels	Offensive tackle	Alabama	
2000	John Henderson	Defensive tackle	Tennessee (2)	
2001	Bryant McKinnie	Offensive tackle	Miami (FL) (2)	
2002	Rien Long	Defensive tackle	Washington State	
2003	Robert Gallery	Offensive tackle	Iowa (3)	
2004	Jammal Brown	Offensive tackle	Oklahoma (5)	
2005	Greg Eslinger	Center	Minnesota (3)	
2006	Joe Thomas	Offensive tackle	Wisconsin	
2007	Glenn Dorsey	Defensive tackle	LSU	
2008	Andre Smith	Offensive tackle	Alabama (2)	
2009	Ndamukong Suh	Defensive tackle	Nebraska (9)	
2010	Gabe Carimi	Offensive tackle	Wisconsin (2)	
2011	Barrett Jones	Offensive tackle	Alabama (3)	
2012	Luke Joeckel	Offensive tackle	Texas A&M	
2013	Aaron Donald	Defensive tackle	Pittsburgh (2)	
2014	Brandon Scherff	Offensive tackle	Iowa (4)	
2015	Joshua Garnett	Guard	Stanford	
2016	Cam Robinson	Offensive tackle	Alabama (4)	
2017	Ed Oliver	Defensive tackle	Houston	
2018	Quinnen Williams	Defensive tackle	Alabama (5)	
2019	Penei Sewell	Offensive tackle	Oregon	
2020	Alex Leatherwood	Offensive tackle	Alabama (6)	
2021	Jordan Davis	Defensive tackle	Georgia (2)	
2022	Olu Oluwatimi	Center	Michigan	
2023	T'Vondre Sweat	Defensive tackle	Texas (4)	
2024	Kelvin Banks Jr.	Offensive tackle	Texas (5)	
2025	Spencer Fano	Offensive tackle	Utah	

== See also ==
- Lombardi Award
- Rimington Trophy
- UPI Lineman of the Year (College)
