= 1998 USC Trojans football team =

American college football season

1998 USC Trojans football

Sun Bowl, L 19–28 vs. TCU
- Conference: Pacific-10 Conference
- Record: 8–5 (5–3 Pac-10)
- Head coach: Paul Hackett (1st season)
- Offensive coordinator: Hue Jackson (2nd season)
- Offensive scheme: Pro-style
- Defensive coordinator: Bill Young (1st season)
- Base defense: 4–3
- Captains: Adam Abrams; Chris Claiborne; Billy Miller; Chad Morton
- Home stadium: Los Angeles Memorial Coliseum

1998 Pacific-10 Conference football standings
	Conf.			Overall
Team	W		L	W		L
No. 8 UCLA $	8	–	0	10	–	2
No. 4 Arizona	7	–	1	12	–	1
Oregon	5	–	3	8	–	4
USC	5	–	3	8	–	5
Washington	4	–	4	6	–	6
Arizona State	4	–	4	5	–	6
California	3	–	5	5	–	6
Oregon State	2	–	6	5	–	6
Stanford	2	–	6	3	–	8
Washington State	0	–	8	3	–	8
$ – BCS representative as conference champion; Rankings from AP Poll

The 1998 USC Trojans football team represented the University of Southern California (USC) as a member of Pacific-10 Conference (Pac-10) during the 1998 NCAA Division I-A football season. In their first year under head coach Paul Hackett, the Trojans compiled an overall record of 8-5 with a mark of 5–3 in conference play, tying for third place in the Pac-10, and outscored opponents 346 to 241. USC was invited to the Sun Bowl, where the Trojans lost to TCU. The team played home games at Los Angeles Memorial Coliseum in Los Angeles. It was the Trojans' 75th anniversary playing at the Coliseum.

This was Hackett's only winning season and bowl appearance at USC. After three wins, including an opener against Purdue in the Pigskin Classic, USC was ranked as high as No. 18 in the AP poll, but lost two of its next three and dropped out of the rankings for the rest of the season. During halftime of the game against UCLA, 91-year-old USC "Super Fan" Giles Pellerin died while watching his 797th consecutive USC football game.

Quarterback Carson Palmer led the team in passing, completing 130 of 235 passes for 1,755 yards with seven touchdowns and six interceptions. Chad Morton led the team in rushing with 199 carries for 985 yards and six touchdowns. R. Jay Soward led the team in receiving yards with 44 catches for 679 yards and six touchdowns; Billy Miller also had 49 catches for 623 yards and six touchdowns.

== Schedule ==
Date	Time	Opponent	Rank	Site	TV	Result	Attendance	Source
August 30	11:30 a.m.	Purdue*		Los Angeles Memorial Coliseum; Los Angeles, CA (Pigskin Classic)	ABC	W 27–17	56,623	
September 12	7:30 p.m.	San Diego State*	No. 22	Los Angeles Memorial Coliseum; Los Angeles, CA	FSNW2	W 35–6	49,927	
September 19	7:00 p.m.	Oregon State	No. 18	Los Angeles Memorial Coliseum; Los Angeles, CA	FSNW2	W 40–20	45,629	
September 26	12:30 p.m.	at No. 10 Florida State*	No. 18	Doak Campbell Stadium; Tallahassee, FL	ABC	L 10–30	79,815	
October 3	4:00 p.m.	Arizona State	No. 21	Los Angeles Memorial Coliseum; Los Angeles, CA	ABC	W 35–24	56,093	
October 10	3:30 p.m.	California	No. 19	Los Angeles Memorial Coliseum; Los Angeles, CA	FSN	L 31–32	65,678	
October 17	7:15 p.m.	at Washington State		Martin Stadium; Pullman, WA	FSN	W 42–14	31,178	
October 24	3:30 p.m.	at No. 12 Oregon		Autzen Stadium; Eugene, OR	FSN	L 13–17	45,807	
October 31	12:30 p.m.	Washington^{†}		Los Angeles Memorial Coliseum; Los Angeles, CA	ABC	W 33–10	62,276	
November 7	3:30 p.m.	at Stanford		Stanford Stadium; Stanford, CA (rivalry)	FSN	W 34–9	43,250	
November 21	12:30 p.m.	at No. 3 UCLA		Rose Bowl; Pasadena, CA (Victory Bell)	ABC	L 17–34	88,080	
November 28	5:00 p.m.	No. 9 Notre Dame*		Los Angeles Memorial Coliseum; Los Angeles, CA (rivalry)	ABC	W 10–0	90,069	
December 31	11:00 a.m.	vs. TCU*		Sun Bowl; El Paso, TX (Sun Bowl)	CBS	L 19–28	46,612	
*Non-conference game; ^{†}Homecoming; Rankings from AP Poll released prior to the game; All times are in Pacific time

== Rankings ==
Ranking movements Legend: ██ Increase in ranking ██ Decrease in ranking — = Not ranked RV = Received votes
	Week															
Poll	Pre	1	2	3	4	5	6	7	8	9	10	11	12	13	14	Final
AP	RV	22	18	18	21	19	—	—	—	—	—	RV	—	—	—	RV
Coaches Poll	RV	23	16	17	22	20	—	—	—	—	—	RV	—	—	RV	—
BCS	Not released								—	—	—	20	—	—	—	Not released

== Game summaries ==
=== vs Purdue ===
	1	2	3	4	Total
Boilermakers	14	3	0	0	17
Trojans	7	3	7	10	27

=== vs San Diego State ===
	1	2	3	4	Total
Aztecs	0	6	0	0	6
No. 22 Trojans	7	14	0	14	35

=== vs Oregon State ===
	1	2	3	4	Total
Beavers	7	3	7	3	20
No. 18 Trojans	7	10	3	20	40

=== at No. 10 Florida State ===
	1	2	3	4	Total
No. 18 Trojans	3	0	7	0	10
No. 10 Seminoles	3	10	7	10	30

=== vs Arizona State ===
	1	2	3	4	Total
Sun Devils	7	10	7	0	24
No. 21 Trojans	0	7	6	22	35

=== vs California ===
	1	2	3	4	Total
Golden Bears	7	3	8	14	32
No. 19 Trojans	7	17	7	0	31

=== at Washington State ===
	1	2	3	4	Total
Trojans	7	14	14	7	42
Cougars	7	7	0	0	14

=== at No. 12 Oregon ===
	1	2	3	4	Total
Trojans	0	10	0	3	13
No. 12 Ducks	0	3	7	7	17

=== vs Washington ===
	1	2	3	4	Total
Huskies	0	0	10	0	10
Trojans	7	7	0	19	33

=== at Stanford ===
	1	2	3	4	Total
Trojans	10	7	3	14	34
Cardinal	7	0	0	2	9

=== at No. 3 UCLA ===
	1	2	3	4	Total
Trojans	3	7	7	0	17
No. 3 Bruins	14	13	0	7	34

=== vs No. 9 Notre Dame ===
	1	2	3	4	Total
No. 9 Fighting Irish	0	0	0	0	0
Trojans	0	0	10	0	10

=== Sun Bowl (vs TCU) ===
	1	2	3	4	Total
Trojans	0	3	13	3	19
Horned Frogs	14	7	7	0	28

== Personnel ==
=== Coaching staff ===
1998 USC Trojans coaching staff
Name	Position	Year at USC	Alma mater (year)
Paul Hackett	Head coach	1st	UC Davis (1969)
Steve Greatwood	Offensive line	1st	Oregon (1981)
Hue Jackson	Offensive coordinator/running backs	2nd	Pacific (1987)
Ken O'Brien	Quarterbacks	1st	UC Davis (1983)
Ed Orgeron	Defensive line	1st	Northwestern State (1984)
Larry Petroff	Tight ends/recruiting coordinator	1st	Ashland College (1973)
Shawn Slocum	Linebackers	1st	Texas A&M (1987)
Dennis Thurman	Secondary	6th	USC (1978)
Mike Wilson	Wide receivers	2nd	Washington State (1981)
Bill Young	Defensive coordinator	1st	Oklahoma State (1967)

=== Roster ===
1998 USC Trojans football team roster
Players
Coaches
Offense

Pos.	#	Name	Class
OT	71	Travis Claridge	Jr
WR	3	Billy Miller	Sr
TB	7	Chad Morton	Jr
WR	80	Larry Parker	Sr
QB	3	Carson Palmer	Fr
WR	18	R. Jay Soward	Jr

Defense

Pos.	#	Name	Class
LB	55	Chris Claiborne	Jr
DB	27	David Gibson	Jr
CB	1	Daylon McCutcheon	Sr
LB	34	Zeke Moreno	So

Special teams

Pos.	#	Name	Class

Head coach

- Paul Hackett

Coordinators/assistant coaches

Legend

- (C) Team captain
- (S) Suspended
- (I) Ineligible
- Injured
- Redshirt

Roster

== Awards ==
- All-Pac-10: OL Travis Claridge, DL Ennis Davis, LB Chris Claiborne, DB Daylon McCutcheon, DB Rashard Cook
