= 1998 Arizona State Sun Devils football team =

American college football season

1998 Arizona State Sun Devils football
- Conference: Pacific-10 Conference
- Record: 5–6 (4–4 Pac-10)
- Head coach: Bruce Snyder (7th season)
- Offensive coordinator: Dan Cozzetto (7th season)
- Defensive coordinator: Phil Snow (4th season)
- Home stadium: Sun Devil Stadium

1998 Pacific-10 Conference football standings
	Conf.			Overall
Team	W		L	W		L
No. 8 UCLA $	8	–	0	10	–	2
No. 4 Arizona	7	–	1	12	–	1
Oregon	5	–	3	8	–	4
USC	5	–	3	8	–	5
Washington	4	–	4	6	–	6
Arizona State	4	–	4	5	–	6
California	3	–	5	5	–	6
Oregon State	2	–	6	5	–	6
Stanford	2	–	6	3	–	8
Washington State	0	–	8	3	–	8
$ – BCS representative as conference champion; Rankings from AP Poll

The 1998 Arizona State Sun Devils football team represented Arizona State University as a member of the Pacific-10 Conference (Pac-10) during the 1998 NCAA Division I-A football season. In their seventh season under head coach Bruce Snyder, the Sun Devils compiled an overall record of 5–6 with a mark of 4–4 in conference play, tying for fifth place in the Pac-10. The team played home games at Sun Devil Stadium in Tempe, Arizona.

== Schedule ==
Date	Time	Opponent	Rank	Site	TV	Result	Attendance
September 5	7:15 pm	No. 18 Washington	No. 8	Sun Devil Stadium; Tempe, AZ	FSN	L 38–42	72,118
September 12	6:00 pm	at BYU*	No. 14	Cougar Stadium; Provo, UT	ESPN2	L 6–26	65,096
September 19	7:00 pm	North Texas*		Sun Devil Stadium; Tempe, AZ		W 34–15	61,158
September 26	7:00 pm	Oregon State		Sun Devil Stadium; Tempe, AZ	FSNAZ	W 24–3	59,630
October 3	3:30 pm	at No. 21 USC		Los Angeles Memorial Coliseum; Los Angeles, CA	FSN	L 24–35	56,093
October 10	12:30 pm	No. 22 Notre Dame*		Sun Devil Stadium; Tempe, AZ	ABC	L 9–28	73,501
October 22	7:00 pm	Stanford		Sun Devil Stadium; Tempe, AZ	FSN	W 44–38 ^{OT}	58,155
October 31	3:00 pm	at Washington State		Martin Stadium; Pullman, WA		W 38–28	34,039
November 7	4:00 pm	California		Sun Devil Stadium; Tempe, AZ		W 55–22	64,973
November 14	2:00 pm	at No. 20 Oregon		Autzen Stadium; Eugene, OR		L 19–51	43,723
November 27	4:30 pm	at No. 8 Arizona		Arizona Stadium; Tucson, AZ (rivalry)	FSN	L 42–50	57,953
*Non-conference game; Rankings from AP Poll released prior to the game; All times are in Mountain time

== Rankings ==
Ranking movements Legend: ██ Increase in ranking ██ Decrease in ranking — = Not ranked ( ) = First-place votes
	Week															
Poll	Pre	1	2	3	4	5	6	7	8	9	10	11	12	13	14	Final
AP	8 (2)	14	—	—	—	—	—	—	—	—	—	—	—	—	—	—
Coaches Poll	9	15	—	—	—	—	—	—	—	—	—	—	—	—	—	—
BCS	Not released								—	—	—	—	—	—	—	Not released

== Game summaries ==
=== Washington ===
Washington Huskies (0–0) at Arizona State Sun Devils (0–0)

Quarter	1	2	3	4	Total
Washington	7	14	14	7	42
Arizona State	14	14	0	10	38

at Sun Devil Stadium, Tempe, Arizona

- Date: September 5
- Game time: 7:22 p.m.
- Game weather: Clear, 86 °F (30 °C)
- Game attendance: 72,118
- Referee: Gordon Riese
- TV: FSN

Game information

First quarter

- ASU – Kendrick Bates 13-yard pass from Ryan Kealy (Mike Gauthier kick), 12:15. Arizona State 7–0. Drive: 7 plays, 61 yards, 2:45.
- WASH – Reggie Davis 3-yard pass from Brock Huard (Jim Skurski kick), 8:29. Tie 7–7. Drive: 13 plays, 57 yards, 3:46.
- ASU – Todd Heap 15-yard pass from Ryan Kealy (Mike Gauthier kick), 2:19. Arizona State 14–7. Drive: 14 plays, 71 yards, 6:10.

Second quarter

- WASH – Pat Conniff 16-yard pass from Brock Huard (Jim Skurski kick), 9:05. Tie 14–14. Drive: 10 plays, 87 yards, 4:11.
- ASU – Davaren Hightower 2-yard run (Mike Gauthier kick), 7:03. Arizona State 21–14. Drive: 7 plays, 87 yards, 2:02.
- ASU – J.R. Redmond 22-yard run (Mike Gauthier kick), 5:30. Arizona State 28–14. Drive: 3 plays, 31 yards, 1:33.
- WASH – Dane Looker 3-yard pass from Brock Huard (Jim Skurski kick), 3:04. Arizona State 28–21. Drive: 8 plays, 77 yards, 2:26.

Third quarter

- WASH – Dane Looker 9-yard pass from Brock Huard (Jim Skurski kick), 8:42. Tie 28–28. Drive: 8 plays, 0 yards, 2:47.
- WASH – Jason Harris 5-yard run (Jim Skurski kick), 4:45. Washington 35–28. Drive: 6 plays, 50 yards, 1:53.

Fourth quarter

- ASU – Mike Gauthier 42-yard field goal, 12:21. Washington 35–31. Drive: 16 plays, 54 yards, 7:24.
- ASU – Tariq McDonald 8-yard pass from Ryan Kealy (Mike Gauthier kick), 2:00. Arizona State 38–35. Drive: 8 plays, 20 yards, 2:33.
- WASH – Reggie Davis 63-yard pass from Brock Huard (Jim Skurski kick), 0:28. Washington 42–38. Drive: 6 plays, 80 yards, 1:32.

Top passers

- WASH – Brock Huard – 27/47, 318 yards, 4 TD
- ASU – Ryan Kealy – 20/35, 302 yards, 3 TD

Top rushers

- WASH – Maurice Shaw – 16 rushes, 51 yards
- ASU – J.R. Redmond – 22 rushes, 108 yards, TD

Top receivers

- WASH – Dane Looker – 11 receptions, 108 yards, 2 TD
- ASU – Creig Spann – 4 receptions, 71 yards

== Roster ==
1998 Arizona State Sun Devils football team roster
Players
Coaches
Offense

Pos.	#	Name	Class
TE		Todd Heap
RB		Davaren Hightower
QB		Ryan Kealy
WR		Tariq McDonald
RB		J.R. Redmond
WR		Creig Spann

Defense

Pos.	#	Name	Class
LB		Adam Archuleta
DL		Erik Flowers

Special teams

Pos.	#	Name	Class
K		Mike Gauthier

Head coach

- Bruce Snyder

Coordinators/assistant coaches

- Phil Snow

Legend

- (C) Team captain
- (S) Suspended
- (I) Ineligible
- Injured
- Redshirt
