= 1998 Aloha Bowl =

American college football game

1998 Jeep Aloha Bowl
Colorado Buffaloes	Oregon Ducks
(7–4)	(8–3)
51	43
Head coach: Rick Neuheisel	Head coach: Mike Belloti
	AP / Coaches / BCS; 21 / 21 / 21
	1	2	3	4	Total
Colorado	17	20	7	7	51
Oregon	0	14	7	22	43
- Date: December 25, 1998
- Season: 1998
- Stadium: Aloha Stadium
- Location: Honolulu, Hawaii
- Referee: Bill McCabe (WAC)
- Attendance: 46,451

United States TV coverage
- Network: ABC
- Announcers: Brent Musburger, Dan Fouts, Jack Arute

The 1998 Aloha Bowl was a postseason college football bowl game between the Colorado Buffaloes of the Big 12 Conference and the Oregon Ducks of the Pacific-10 Conference. It was the last game of the season for these two schools and the last college game for Duck legend Akili Smith. Colorado won, 51–43.
