= 1998 Oregon State Beavers football team =

American college football season

1998 Oregon State Beavers football
- Conference: Pacific-10 Conference
- Record: 5–6 (2–6 Pac-10)
- Head coach: Mike Riley (2nd season)
- Offensive coordinator: Paul Chryst (2nd season)
- Defensive coordinator: Greg Newhouse (2nd season)
- Home stadium: Parker Stadium

1998 Pacific-10 Conference football standings
	Conf.			Overall
Team	W		L	W		L
No. 8 UCLA $	8	–	0	10	–	2
No. 4 Arizona	7	–	1	12	–	1
Oregon	5	–	3	8	–	4
USC	5	–	3	8	–	5
Washington	4	–	4	6	–	6
Arizona State	4	–	4	5	–	6
California	3	–	5	5	–	6
Oregon State	2	–	6	5	–	6
Stanford	2	–	6	3	–	8
Washington State	0	–	8	3	–	8
$ – BCS representative as conference champion; Rankings from AP Poll

The 1998 Oregon State Beavers football team represented Oregon State University in the Pacific-10 Conference (Pac-10) during the 1998 NCAA Division I-A football season. Led by second-year-head coach Mike Riley, the Beavers compiled an overall record of 5–6 record with mark of 2–6 in conference play, tying for eighth place in the Pac-10. It was the program's first five-win season since 1971. The team played home games at Parker Stadium in Corvallis, Oregon.

Riley left Oregon State after the season, in January 1999, to become the head coach for the San Diego Chargers of the National Football League (NFL). He was succeeded by Dennis Erickson, previously the head coach of the NFL's Seattle Seahawks for four years, preceded by six seasons at the head football coach at the University of Miami. Four years later, in February 2003, Erickson left for the NFL's San Francisco 49ers, and Riley returned to Corvallis as head coach for the Beavers.

== Schedule ==
Date	Time	Opponent	Site	TV	Result	Attendance
September 5	1:00 pm	Nevada*	Parker Stadium; Corvallis, OR		W 48–6	27,426
September 12	1:00 pm	Baylor*	Parker Stadium; Corvallis, OR		W 27–17	26,243
September 19	7:00 pm	at No. 18 USC	Los Angeles Memorial Coliseum; Los Angeles, CA	FSN	L 20–40	45,629
September 26	7:00 pm	at Arizona State	Sun Devil Stadium; Tempe, AZ	FSN	L 3–24	59,630
October 3	7:00 pm	at Utah State*	Romney Stadium; Logan, UT		W 20–16	11,682
October 10	2:00 pm	at Stanford	Stanford Stadium; Stanford, CA		W 30–23	34,298
October 17	1:00 pm	No. 16 Arizona	Parker Stadium; Corvallis, OR		L 7–28	30,231
October 24	12:30 pm	at Washington	Husky Stadium; Seattle, WA		L 34–35	71,552
October 31	1:00 pm	California	Parker Stadium; Corvallis, OR		L 19–20	23,594
November 7	3:30 pm	No. 3 UCLA	Parker Stadium; Corvallis, OR	FSN	L 34–41	26,017
November 21	3:30 pm	No. 15 Oregon	Parker Stadium; Corvallis, OR (Civil War)	FSN	W 44–41 ^{2OT}	37,777
*Non-conference game; Rankings from AP Poll released prior to the game; All times are in Pacific time
