= 1998 Stanford Cardinal football team =

American college football season

1998 Stanford Cardinal football
- Conference: Pacific-10 Conference
- Record: 3–8 (2–6 Pac-10)
- Head coach: Tyrone Willingham (4th season)
- Offensive coordinator: Bill Diedrick (1st season)
- Offensive scheme: West Coast
- Defensive coordinator: Bill Harris (4th season)
- Base defense: 4–3
- Home stadium: Stanford Stadium

1998 Pacific-10 Conference football standings
	Conf.			Overall
Team	W		L	W		L
No. 8 UCLA $	8	–	0	10	–	2
No. 4 Arizona	7	–	1	12	–	1
Oregon	5	–	3	8	–	4
USC	5	–	3	8	–	5
Washington	4	–	4	6	–	6
Arizona State	4	–	4	5	–	6
California	3	–	5	5	–	6
Oregon State	2	–	6	5	–	6
Stanford	2	–	6	3	–	8
Washington State	0	–	8	3	–	8
$ – BCS representative as conference champion; Rankings from AP Poll

The 1998 Stanford Cardinal football team represented Stanford University as a member of the Pacific-10 Conference (Pac-10) during 1998 NCAA Division I-A football season. Led by fourth-year head coach Tyrone Willingham, the Cardinal compiled an overall record of 3–8 with a mark of 2–8 in conference play, tying for eighth place in the Pac-10. The team played home games at Stanford Stadium in Stanford, California.

== Schedule ==
Date	Time	Opponent	Site	TV	Result	Attendance	Source
September 5	12:30 p.m.	San Jose State*	Stanford Stadium; Stanford, CA (rivalry)		L 23–35	36,396	
September 12	12:30 p.m.	No. 21 Arizona	Stanford Stadium; Stanford, CA		L 14–31	30,096	
September 19	3:30 p.m.	North Carolina*	Stanford Stadium; Stanford, CA	FSN	W 37–34	34,198	
September 26	1:00 p.m.	at No. 20 Oregon	Autzen Stadium; Eugene, OR (rivalry)	FSNBA	L 28–63	43,948	
October 3	11:30 a.m.	at No. 23 Notre Dame*	Notre Dame Stadium; Notre Dame, IN (rivalry)	NBC	L 17–35	80,012	
October 10	2:00 p.m.	Oregon State	Stanford Stadium; Stanford, CA		L 23–30	34,298	
October 22	7:00 p.m.	at Arizona State	Sun Devil Stadium; Tempe, AZ	FSN	L 38–44 ^{OT}	58,155	
October 31	3:30 p.m.	at No. 2 UCLA	Rose Bowl; Pasadena, CA (rivalry)	FX	L 24–28	64,820	
November 7	3:30 p.m.	USC	Stanford Stadium; Stanford, CA (rivalry)	FSNBA	L 9–34	43,250	
November 14	12:30 p.m.	Washington State	Stanford Stadium; Stanford, CA		W 38–28	30,418	
November 21	12:30 p.m.	at California	California Memorial Stadium; Berkeley, CA (Big Game)	ABC	W 10–3	69,000	
*Non-conference game; Rankings from AP Poll released prior to the game; All times are in Pacific time

== Game summaries ==
=== San Jose State ===
	1	2	3	4	Total
Spartans					0
Cardinal					0

=== Arizona ===
	1	2	3	4	Total
No. 21 Wildcats					0
Cardinal					0

=== North Carolina ===
	1	2	3	4	Total
Tar Heels					0
Cardinal					0

=== At Oregon ===
	1	2	3	4	Total
Cardinal					0
No. 20 Ducks					0

=== at Notre Dame ===
	1	2	3	4	Total
Cardinal	3	0	0	14	17
No. 23 Fighting Irish	21	7	7	0	35

=== Oregon State ===
	1	2	3	4	Total
Beavers					0
Cardinal					0

=== at Arizona State ===
	1	2	3	4	Total
Cardinal					0
Sun Devils					0

=== at UCLA ===
	1	2	3	4	Total
Cardinal	7	7	10	0	24
No. 2 Bruins	7	7	0	14	28

=== USC ===
	1	2	3	4	Total
Trojans	10	7	3	14	34
Cardinal	7	0	0	2	9

=== Washington State ===
	1	2	3	4	Total
Cougars					0
Cardinal					0

=== at California ===
	1	2	3	4	Total
Cardinal	0	0	7	3	10
Golden Bears	0	3	0	0	3

== Personnel ==
=== Coaching staff ===
- Tyrone Willingham – Head coach
- Bill Diedrick – Offensive coordinator and quarterbacks
- Earle Mosley – Running backs
- Mose Rison – wide receivers
- Pat Shurmur – Offensive line
- Chuck Moller – Tight ends and offensive line (tackles)
- Bill Harris – Defensive coordinator and defensive backs
- Phil Zacharias – Defensive ends and special teams coordinator
- Kent Baer – Inside and outside linebacker
- Dave Tipton – Recruiting coordinator

=== Roster ===
1998 Stanford Cardinal football team roster
Players
Coaches
Offense

Pos.	#	Name	Class
QB	12	Randy Fasani	Fr
OT	75	Eric Heitmann	Fr
QB	7	Todd Husak	Jr
WR	5	Troy Walters	Jr

Defense

Pos.	#	Name	Class
DT	77	Willie Howard	So
LB	97	Riall Johnson	So
DE	74	Jim Telesmanich	So
FS	13	Tank Williams	Fr

Special teams

Pos.	#	Name	Class

Head coach

- Tyrone Willingham

Coordinators/assistant coaches

Legend

- (C) Team captain
- (S) Suspended
- (I) Ineligible
- Injured
- Redshirt

Roster
