= Kris Farris =

American football player (born 1977)

No. 72
- Position: Offensive tackle

Personal information
- Born: March 26, 1977 (age 49); St. Paul, Minnesota, U.S.
- Listed height: 6 ft 8 in (2.03 m)
- Listed weight: 318 lb (144 kg)

Career information
- High school: Santa Margarita Catholic (Rancho Santa Margarita, California)
- College: UCLA
- NFL draft: 1999: 3rd round, 74th overall pick

Career history
- Pittsburgh Steelers (1999); Cincinnati Bengals (2000)*; Buffalo Bills (2001); Greenbay Packers (2002)*; Atlanta Falcons (2002–2003)*
- * Offseason or practice squad member only

Awards and highlights
- Consensus All-American (1998); Outland Trophy (1998); First-team All-Pac-10 (1998)

Career NFL statistics
- Games played: 3
- Games started: 1
- Stats at Pro Football Reference

Kristofer Martin Farris (born March 26, 1977) is an American former professional football player who was an offensive tackle in the National Football League (NFL) for a single season in 2001. He played college football for the UCLA Bruins, earning consensus All-American honors and winning the Outland Trophy in 1998. He was selected in the third round of the 1999 NFL draft by the Pittsburgh Steelers, and played for the NFL's Buffalo Bills.

== Early life ==
Farris was born in St. Paul, Minnesota. He graduated from Santa Margarita Catholic High School in Rancho Santa Margarita, California, where he played high school football for the Santa Margarita Eagles.

== College career ==
Farris attended the University of California, Los Angeles, where he played for the Bruins from 1995 to 1998. As senior in 1998, he was recognized as a consensus first-team All-American, and won the Outland Trophy as the best college football interior lineman in America.

== Professional career ==
The Pittsburgh Steelers selected Farris in the third round (seventy-fourth pick overall) of the 1999 NFL draft, but he never appeared in a regular season game for the Steelers. In 2001, he played in three regular season games for the Buffalo Bills, and started one.
