= 1998 Oahu Bowl =

1998 Jeep Oahu Bowl
- 1st Oahu Bowl
Air Force Falcons	Washington Huskies
(11–1)	(6–5)
43	25
Head coach: Fisher DeBerry	Head coach: Jim Lambright
AP / Coaches; 16 / 13
	1	2	3	4	Total
Air Force	7	13	16	7	43
Washington	0	13	0	12	25
- Date: December 25, 1998
- Season: 1998
- Stadium: Aloha Stadium
- Location: Honolulu, Hawaii
- MVP: QB Blane Morgan
- Favorite: Air Force by 4 points
- Referee: Rich Kollen (Big West)
- Attendance: 34,083

United States TV coverage
- Network: ABC

The 1998 Oahu Bowl was a college football postseason bowl game between the Air Force Falcons and the Washington Huskies. Part of the 1998–99 bowl season, the inaugural Oahu Bowl matched the fifth-place team from the Pacific-10 Conference (Pac-10) against the champions of the Western Athletic Conference (WAC).

== Background ==
The #16 Falcons finished first in the WAC and had only lost one game, to TCU. They were 10th on points scored, with 36.0 points per game and 7th on points allowed with 14.2 points per game, in their sixth bowl appearance in the 1990s.

Washington went from 2–0 and #9 ranked to being unranked and 6–5, though they at least won the Apple Cup. The Huskies were 52nd in points scored, with 25.2 per game and 76th in points allowed, with 28.6 per game, in their seventh bowl appearance in the decade.

Air Force was favored by four points.

== Game summary ==
Jemal Singleton scored in both the first and second quarters to give Air Force a 14–0 lead, but Washington responded with a Braxton Cleman touchdown run less than two minutes later. Scott McKay added onto the lead with a touchdown run to make it 20-7 after their two-point conversion attempt failed. Cleman scored his second touchdown of the day to make it 20–13, with Huard's conversion pass attempt falling short to keep the score the same at halftime.

Jackson Whiting increased the Falcons' lead to 23–13 with a 42-yard field goal, then Spanky Gilliam extended it to 30–13 with his touchdown run. Matt Farmer caught a 79-yard touchdown pass from Blane Morgan with :07 remaining in the third quarter. Their conversion attempt to make it a 25-point lead failed, however, and the score remained at 36–13. Husky backup quarterback Marques Tuiasosopo ran in for a touchdown early in the fourth quarter to narrow the lead, but the two-point conversion failed, leaving the score at 36–19. McKay caught a 30-yard touchdown from Morgan as the Falcons scored their final points of the day. Manuel Austin caught a pass from Tuiasosopo with 4:09 remaining, but another failed conversion attempt left the final score 43–25. Starter Brock Huard was ineffective for the Huskies, going 23 of 32 with three interceptions and 267 yards before being replaced by Tuiasasopo. Morgan went 12 of 16 for 267 yards and two touchdowns. Farmer caught four passes for 109 yards.

== Aftermath ==
Neither team returned to the Oahu Bowl, which disbanded two years later. Washington (6–6) ended their first non-winning season in 22 years. Five days later, sixth-year head coach Jim Lambright was relieved of his duties by athletic director Barbara Hedges. His successor was Rick Neuheisel, the head coach at Colorado in the Big 12 Conference.

Air Force (12–1) moved up in the final rankings, thirteenth in the AP Poll, and tenth in the Coaches Poll.

== Statistics ==
Statistics	Air Force	Washington
First downs	26	21
Yards rushing	232	107
Yards passing	267	310
Total yards	489	417
Punts-Average	2–45.5	2–40.5
Fumbles-Lost	3–1	3–0
Interceptions	0	3
