= Yusuf Scott =

American football player (1976–2019)

No. 69
- Position: Offensive guard

Personal information
- Born: November 30, 1976; La Porte, Texas, U.S.
- Died: November 9, 2019 (aged 42)
- Listed height: 6 ft 3 in (1.91 m)
- Listed weight: 342 lb (155 kg)

Career information
- High school: La Porte (TX)
- College: Arizona
- NFL draft: 1999: 5th round, 168th overall pick

Career history
- Arizona Cardinals (1999–2001); Berlin Thunder (2002); Tampa Bay Buccaneers (2002)*
- * Offseason or practice squad member only

Awards and highlights
- World Bowl champion (X); Morris Trophy (1998); First-team All-Pac-10 (1998)
- Stats at Pro Football Reference

Yusuf Jamall Scott (November 30, 1976 – November 9, 2019) was an American professional football offensive guard who played three seasons in the National Football League (NFL). He played college football for the University of Arizona, and was recognized as an outstanding offensive lineman during his junior year.

== College career ==
Scott played college football at the University of Arizona as offensive linebacker under Coach Dick Tomey from 1996 to 1998. He was made captain during the Wildcats' 12–1 season in 1998, and helped them get to the Holiday Bowl in San Diego where they defeated the Nebraska Cornhuskers 23–20. The Arizona Wildcats finished No. 4 in the AP Top 25 poll, and the Morris Trophy, awarded to the best offensive and defensive linebackers in a season, as selected by opposing players, was won by Scott that year. He was an All-Pac-10 selection, as well. During his senior year, he declared for the NFL and was drafted in the fifth round by the Arizona Cardinals.

== Professional career ==
Scott was selected in the fifth round of the 1999 NFL draft. Scott played offensive guard for the Arizona Cardinals of the National Football League between 1999 and 2001. In 2002, he played for the Berlin Thunder of NFL Europe. That year, the Thunder reached World Bowl X, where they defeated the Rhein Fire 26–20 in front of a record 53,109 fans, winning the NFL Europe championship for the second year in a row.
