= Sekou Sanyika =

American football player (born 1978)

Personal information
- Born: March 17, 1978 (age 48); New Orleans, Louisiana, U.S.
- Listed height: 6 ft 3 in (1.91 m)
- Listed weight: 246 lb (112 kg)

Career information
- College: California
- NFL draft: 2000: 7th round, 215th overall pick

Career history
- Arizona Cardinals (2000−2001)

Awards and highlights
- 2× First-team All-Pac-10 (1998, 1999)

Career NFL statistics
- Tackles: 41
- Sacks: 1
- Fumble recoveries: 1
- Stats at Pro Football Reference

Sekou Sanyika (born March 17, 1978) is an American former professional football player who was a linebacker for the Arizona Cardinals of the National Football League (NFL). He played college football for the California Golden Bears.

== College ==
Sekou attended college at the University of California, Berkeley, where he played for the Golden Bears.

== Professional ==
Sanyika was selected by the Arizona Cardinals in the seventh round of the 2000 NFL draft with the 215th overall pick.
