= Craig Walendy =

American football player (born 1977)

No. 45
- Position: Running back

Personal information
- Born: July 11, 1977 (age 49); New Brunswick, New Jersey, U.S.

Career information
- College: UCLA
- NFL draft: 1999: undrafted

Career history
- San Francisco 49ers (1999)*; Los Angeles Dragons (2000); New York Giants (2000); St. Louis Rams (2001)*
- * Offseason or practice squad member only
- Stats at Pro Football Reference

Craig Hilary Walendy (born July 11, 1977, in New Brunswick, New Jersey) is an American former professional football player who was a fullback for the New York Giants of the National Football League (NFL). He played college football for the UCLA Bruins.
