= 1998 Holiday Bowl =

1998 Culligan Holiday Bowl
Arizona Wildcats	Nebraska Cornhuskers
(11–1)	(9–3)
Pac-10	Big 12
23	20
Head coach: Dick Tomey	Head coach: Frank Solich
AP / Coaches / BCS; 5 / 6 / 7	AP / Coaches / BCS; 14 / 16 / 11
	1	2	3	4	Total
Arizona	6	3	0	14	23
Nebraska	0	13	0	7	20
- Date: December 30, 1998
- Season: 1998
- Stadium: Qualcomm Stadium
- Location: San Diego, California
- MVP: Offensive: Keith Smith, Arizona; Defensive: Mike Rucker, Nebraska
- Referee: Rogers Redding (SEC)
- Halftime show: Marching bands
- Attendance: 65,354
- Payout: US$1,800,968 per team

United States TV coverage
- Network: ESPN
- Announcers: Mike Tirico (Play by Play); Todd Blackledge (Analyst); Dr. Jerry Punch (Sideline)

The 1998 Holiday Bowl was a college football bowl game played December 30, 1998 in San Diego, California. It was part of the 1998 NCAA Division I-A football season. It featured the Arizona Wildcats, and the Nebraska Cornhuskers.

== Game summary ==
Arizona scored the first points of the game with a 38-yard field goal from Mark McDonald opening up a 3–0 lead. They increased that to 6–0, following a 25-yard McDonald field goal, to close the first quarter scoring. In the third quarter, McDonald added his third field goal of the game, a 48-yarder, giving Arizona a 9–0 lead. Nebraska got on the board following a 25-yard field goal from Kris Brown, making it 9–3.

Nebraska quarterback Eric Crouch threw a 45-yard touchdown pass to wide receiver Shevin Wiggins to give Nebraska a 10-9 second quarter lead. Kris Brown added a 23-yard field goal before halftime to give Nebraska a 13-9 halftime lead.

After a third quarter, Arizona quarterback Keith Smith threw a 16-yard touchdown strike to wide receiver Brad Brennan, and Arizona reclaimed a 16–13 lead. Eric Crouch threw his second touchdown pass of the game, to tight end Tracey Wistrom and Nebraska claimed a 20–16 lead. Running back Kelvin Eafon scored on a 1-yard touchdown run for Arizona, and Arizona got the final 23-20 margin of victory.

== Aftermath ==
Nebraska continued their bowl streak, while Arizona did not return to a bowl game again until 2008. The following year, Arizona and Nebraska would have a rematch against each other in the Holiday Bowl.
