= Marcus Bell (linebacker) =

American football player (born 1977)

No. 55
- Position: Linebacker

Personal information
- Born: July 19, 1977 (age 49); St. Johns, Arizona, U.S.
- Listed height: 6 ft 1 in (1.85 m)
- Listed weight: 236 lb (107 kg)

Career information
- High school: St. Johns (AZ)
- College: Arizona
- NFL draft: 2000: 4th round, 116th overall pick

Career history
- Seattle Seahawks (2000–2002); Houston Texans (2004)

Awards and highlights
- First-team All-Pac-10 (1998); Second-team All-Pac-10 (1999)
- Stats at Pro Football Reference

Marcus Udall Bell (born July 19, 1977) is an American former professional football player who played linebacker for three seasons for the Seattle Seahawks of the National Football League (NFL). Bell was selected 116th overall by the Seahawks in the fourth round of the 2000 NFL draft. Bell also played one year for the Houston Texans.

== Professional career ==
Pre-draft measurables
Height	Weight	Arm length	Hand span	40-yard dash	10-yard split	20-yard split	20-yard shuttle	Three-cone drill	Vertical jump	Broad jump	Bench press
6 ft 1 5/8 in (1.87 m)	237 lb (108 kg)	31 7/8 in (0.81 m)	10 1/8 in (0.26 m)	4.81 s	1.65 s	2.78 s	4.33 s	7.17 s	31.5 in (0.80 m)	9 ft 3 in (2.82 m)	21 reps
All values from NFL Combine

== Coaches' comments ==
University of Arizona head coach Dick Tomey called Bell "the best inside linebacker I have ever coached," while defensive coordinator Rich Ellerson highlighted his strong work ethic. His high school coach, Mike Morgan, noted his dedication to studying film and improving his performance.

== Awards and notes ==
- 1998 All-Pac-10 Defensive team
- Anchored the 1998 team that went 12-1 and was ranked 4th in the nation.
- Bell led the Pac-10 his senior year in tackles per game (TPG) with 10.3.
- Bell posted a Pac-10 leading 124 total tackles his senior year in 1999.
- His 139 tackles in 1998 led the nation and he was UA's leader his final two seasons.
- He finished with 405 career tackles, No. 5 on UA's all-time chart.
- Bell was a member of the UofA Dick Tomey's fearsome 1998 defense that recorded a school record 46 sacks in 1998.
- Bell was 3-1 vs. ASU
- One of 11 semi-finalists for the Butkus Award. The award is presented annually to the best linebacker in college football. This list of 11 semi-finalists was determined by balloting done by the 28-member Butkus Award Selection Committee, who made their selections from the initial Butkus Award Watch List of 66 college linebackers.
- In high school Bell never lost a game. His team, the St. Johns Redskins, went 44-0 and were undefeated for 3 years, winning 3 state championships.
- Bell won a state wrestling title his senior year.

== Great games ==
- Bell anchored the U of A defense and held the mighty Nebraska running attack to under 100 yards rushing in the 1998 Holiday Bowl, UofA won 23-20.
- Bell recorded nation high 21 tackles in one game at Washington as a junior.
- Bell and the UA defense held USC to minus-20 yards rushing in its 31-24 win over the Trojans in 1999, Bell had a team-high nine tackles and an interception in the game.
- Against ASU in 1999, Wildcat linebacker Marcus Bell recovered a fumble giving possession to Arizona, they scored, and won the game.
