= 1998 Washington Huskies football team =

American college football season

1998 Washington Huskies football

Oahu Bowl, L 25–45 vs. Air Force
- Conference: Pacific-10 Conference
- Record: 6–6 (4–4 Pac-10)
- Head coach: Jim Lambright (6th season)
- Offensive coordinator: Scott Linehan (3rd season)
- Defensive coordinator: Randy Hart (4th season)
- MVP: Joe Jarzynka
- Captains: Lester Towns; Brock Huard; Nigel Burton; Reggie Davis
- Home stadium: Husky Stadium

1998 Pacific-10 Conference football standings
	Conf.			Overall
Team	W		L	W		L
No. 8 UCLA $	8	–	0	10	–	2
No. 4 Arizona	7	–	1	12	–	1
Oregon	5	–	3	8	–	4
USC	5	–	3	8	–	5
Washington	4	–	4	6	–	6
Arizona State	4	–	4	5	–	6
California	3	–	5	5	–	6
Oregon State	2	–	6	5	–	6
Stanford	2	–	6	3	–	8
Washington State	0	–	8	3	–	8
$ – BCS representative as conference champion; Rankings from AP Poll

The 1998 Washington Huskies football team was an American football team that represented the University of Washington during the 1998 NCAA Division I-A football season. In its sixth and final season under head coach Jim Lambright, the team compiled a 6–5 record in the regular season, tied for fifth (4–4) in the Pacific-10 Conference, and was outscored by opponents 343 to 303. Joe Jarzynka was selected as the team's most valuable player. Nigel Burton, Reggie Davis, Brock Huard, and Lester Towns were the team captains.

For the second straight year, the Huskies played in Honolulu on Christmas Day. They lost 25–43 to Air Force in the Oahu Bowl, resulting in the program's first non-winning season in 22 years. Five days later, Lambright was relieved of his duties as head coach by athletic director Barbara Hedges. His successor was Rick Neuheisel, the head coach at Colorado in the Big 12 Conference.

== Schedule ==
Date	Time	Opponent	Rank	Site	TV	Result	Attendance
September 5	7:15 p.m.	at No. 8 Arizona State	No. 18	Sun Devil Stadium; Tempe, AZ	FSN	W 42–38	72,118
September 19	12:30 p.m.	BYU*	No. 9	Husky Stadium; Seattle, WA	ABC	W 20–10	71,297
September 26	12:30 p.m.	at No. 2 Nebraska*	No. 9	Memorial Stadium; Lincoln, NE (College GameDay)	ABC	L 7–55	76,372
October 3	7:00 p.m.	No. 14 Arizona	No. 20	Husky Stadium; Seattle, WA	FSN	L 28–31	71,469
October 10	12:30 p.m.	Utah State*		Husky Stadium; Seattle, WA		W 53–12	70,210
October 17	3:30 p.m.	California		Husky Stadium; Seattle, WA	FSN	W 21–13	71,215
October 24	12:30 p.m.	Oregon State^{†}		Husky Stadium; Seattle, WA		W 35–34	71,552
October 31	12:30 p.m.	at USC		Los Angeles Memorial Coliseum; Los Angeles, CA	ABC	L 10–33	62,276
November 7	12:30 p.m.	at No. 21 Oregon		Autzen Stadium; Eugene, OR (rivalry)	ABC	L 22–27	46,031
November 14	12:30 p.m.	No. 3 UCLA		Husky Stadium; Seattle, WA	ABC	L 24–36	72,391
November 21	12:30 p.m.	at Washington State		Martin Stadium; Pullman, WA (Apple Cup)	ABC	W 16–9	37,251
December 25	5:30 p.m.	vs. No. 16 Air Force*		Aloha Stadium; Halawa, HI (Oahu Bowl)	ESPN	L 25–45	46,451
*Non-conference game; ^{†}Homecoming; Rankings from AP Poll released prior to the game; All times are in Pacific time

== Rankings ==
Ranking movements Legend: ██ Increase in ranking ██ Decrease in ranking — = Not ranked
	Week															
Poll	Pre	1	2	3	4	5	6	7	8	9	10	11	12	13	14	Final
AP	18	11	9	9	20	—	—	—	—	—	—	—	—	—	—	—
Coaches Poll	17	10	9	8	20	—	—	—	—	—	—	—	—	—	—	—
BCS	Not released								—	—	—	—	—	—	—	Not released

== Game summaries ==
=== At Arizona State ===
Washington Huskies (0–0) at Arizona State Sun Devils (0–0)

Quarter	1	2	3	4	Total
Washington	7	14	14	7	42
Arizona State	14	14	0	10	38

at Sun Devil Stadium, Tempe, Arizona

- Date: September 5
- Game time: 7:22 p.m.
- Game weather: Clear, 86 °F (30 °C)
- Game attendance: 72,118
- Referee: Gordon Riese
- TV: FSN
- Box Score

Game information

First quarter

- ASU – Kendrick Bates 13-yard pass from Ryan Kealy (Mike Gauthier kick), 12:15. Arizona State 7–0. Drive: 7 plays, 61 yards, 2:45.
- WASH – Reggie Davis 3-yard pass from Brock Huard (Jim Skurski kick), 8:29. Tie 7–7. Drive: 13 plays, 57 yards, 3:46.
- ASU – Todd Heap 15-yard pass from Ryan Kealy (Mike Gauthier kick), 2:19. Arizona State 14–7. Drive: 14 plays, 71 yards, 6:10.

Second quarter

- WASH – Pat Conniff 16-yard pass from Brock Huard (Jim Skurski kick), 9:05. Tie 14–14. Drive: 10 plays, 87 yards, 4:11.
- ASU – Davaren Hightower 2-yard run (Mike Gauthier kick), 7:03. Arizona State 21–14. Drive: 7 plays, 87 yards, 2:02.
- ASU – J.R. Redmond 22-yard run (Mike Gauthier kick), 5:30. Arizona State 28–14. Drive: 3 plays, 31 yards, 1:33.
- WASH – Dane Looker 3-yard pass from Brock Huard (Jim Skurski kick), 3:04. Arizona State 28–21. Drive: 8 plays, 77 yards, 2:26.

Third quarter

- WASH – Dane Looker 9-yard pass from Brock Huard (Jim Skurski kick), 8:42. Tie 28–28. Drive: 8 plays, 0 yards, 2:47.
- WASH – Jason Harris 5-yard run (Jim Skurski kick), 4:45. Washington 35–28. Drive: 6 plays, 50 yards, 1:53.

Fourth quarter

- ASU – Mike Gauthier 42-yard field goal, 12:21. Washington 35–31. Drive: 16 plays, 54 yards, 7:24.
- ASU – Tariq McDonald 8-yard pass from Ryan Kealy (Mike Gauthier kick), 2:00. Arizona State 38–35. Drive: 8 plays, 20 yards, 2:33.
- WASH – Reggie Davis 63-yard pass from Brock Huard (Jim Skurski kick), 0:28. Washington 42–38. Drive: 6 plays, 80 yards, 1:32.

Top passers

- WASH – Brock Huard – 27/47, 318 yards, 4 TD
- ASU – Ryan Kealy – 20/35, 302 yards, 3 TD

Top rushers

- WASH – Maurice Shaw – 16 rushes, 51 yards
- ASU – J.R. Redmond – 22 rushes, 108 yards, TD

Top receivers

- WASH – Dane Looker – 11 receptions, 108 yards, 2 TD
- ASU – Creig Spann – 4 receptions, 71 yards

== Roster ==
1998 Washington Huskies football team roster
Players
Coaches
Offense

Pos.	#	Name	Class
RB	29	Braxton Cleman	Fr
G	67	Tony Coats	Sr
FB	47	Pat Conniff	So
OT	75	Aaron Dalan	Sr
TE	5	Reggie Davis (C)	Sr
WR	3	Andre DeSaussure	Sr
WR	84	Todd Elstrom	Fr
WR	9	Gerald Harris	So
RB	18	Jason Harris	Sr
WR	4	Ja'Warren Hooker	So
QB	7	Brock Huard (C)	Jr
RB	1	Willie Hurst	Fr
C	51	Brad Hutt	Sr
RB	21	Joe Jarzynka	Jr
WR	89	Chris Juergens	Fr
WR	80	Dane Looker	Jr
QB	11	Marques Tuiasosopo	So
QB	12	J.K. Scott	Fr
OT	68	Elliot Silvers	So
G	71	Chad Ward	So

Defense

Pos.	#	Name	Class
FS	9	Hakim Akbar	Fr
ROV	8	Nigel Burton (C)	Sr
CB	10	Toure Butler	So
CB	11	Wondame Davis	Fr
LB	27	Marques Hairston	Jr
NT	95	Jabari Issa	Jr
LB	23	Todd Johnson	Sr
FS	13	Brendan Jones	Sr
DB	12	Omare Lowe	Fr
LB	4	Jeremiah Pharms	So
DT	78	Mac Tuiaea	Jr
LB	17	Lester Towns (C)	Jr
DE	99	Josh Smith	Sr

Special teams

Pos.	#	Name	Class
P	16	Ryan Fleming	Jr
KR, PK	21	Joe Jarzynka	Jr
PK	14	Jim Skurski	Fr

Head coach

- Jim Lambright (6th year)

Coordinators/assistant coaches

- Randy Hart (AHC, DC, DL)
- Scott Linehan (OC, QB)
- Dick Baird (LB)
- Cary Conklin (WR)
- Rick Mallory (TE)
- Ron Milus (DB)
- Steve Morton (OL)
- Wayne Moses (RB)
- Scott Pelluer (Rov, Wh LB)
- Ikaika Malloe (GA)

Legend

- (C) Team captain
- (S) Suspended
- (I) Ineligible
- Injured
- Redshirt

== NFL draft ==
Two Huskies were selected in the 1999 NFL draft, which lasted seven rounds (253 selections).

Player	Position	Round	Overall	Franchise
Brock Huard	QB	3rd	77	Seattle Seahawks
Tony Coats	T	7th	209	Cincinnati Bengals
