= 1998 Sun Bowl =

American college football game

1998 Norwest Sun Bowl
- 65th Sun Bowl
USC Trojans	TCU Horned Frogs
(8–4)	(6–5)
Pac-10	WAC
19	28
Head coach: Paul Hackett	Head coach: Dennis Franchione
	1	2	3	4	Total
USC	0	3	13	3	19
TCU	14	7	7	0	28
- Date: December 31, 1998
- Season: 1998
- Stadium: Sun Bowl
- Location: El Paso, Texas
- Referee: Dennis Hennigan (Big East)
- Attendance: 46,612

United States TV coverage
- Network: CBS

The 1998 Norwest Sun Bowl was played by the TCU Horned Frogs and the USC Trojans. This was the 65th Sun Bowl held and the last sponsored by Norwest Corporation prior to its merger with Wells Fargo.

== Background ==
Paul Hackett was in his first year (of three) with USC, having led them to a bowl game for the first time since the 1996 Rose Bowl. This would be Hackett's only bowl game with USC.

TCU hadn't been to a bowl game since the 1994 Independence Bowl nor won one since the 1957 Cotton Bowl Classic. Despite having only a 6–5 record, they were invited to a bowl game due to the Big Ten not having enough bowl-eligible teams. They were coached by first year head coach Dennis Franchione.

== Game summary ==
Basil Mitchell had only 19 carries but ran for 185 yards and two touchdowns as TCU scored on their first three possessions and dominated the time of possession in the first half (having the ball for 20:15). TCU quarterback Patrick Batteaux also had two touchdowns for TCU, both rushing. But Carson Palmer (who had 280 yards passing) threw two touchdowns (one to Billy Miller and the other to Petros Papadakis) that made it 28–16 going into the fourth quarter. After stopping TCU on a drive, the Trojans got the ball back and drove to the TCU 20 early in the fourth quarter. But TCU's defense stuffed their offense, as USC kicked a field goal to make 28–19. From that point on, TCU ate up most of the clock as USC did not score again, giving TCU their first bowl win since 1957 in what would be the first of six consecutive bowl appearances.

Defensive Lineman London Dunlap was named Jimmy Rogers, Jr. Most Valuable Lineman and Running back Basil Mitchell was named C.M. Hendricks Most Valuable Player.

Statistics	TCU	USC
First downs	18	12
Yards rushing	314	-23
Yards passing	51	280
Total yards	475	331
Punts-Average	5-37.8	6-45.8
Fumbles-Lost	0-0	1-0
Interceptions	0	0
Penalties-Yards	6-55	7-49
