= John McLaughlin (American football) =

American football player (born 1975)

No. 95
- Position: Defensive end

Personal information
- Born: November 13, 1975 (age 50); Cleveland, Ohio, U.S.
- Listed height: 6 ft 4 in (1.93 m)
- Listed weight: 247 lb (112 kg)

Career information
- High school: William S. Hart (Santa Clarita, California)
- College: California; Notre Dame
- NFL draft: 1999: 5th round, 150th overall pick

Career history
- Tampa Bay Buccaneers (1999–2000)

Awards and highlights
- All-Rookie Team (1999); First-team All-Pac-10 (1998)

Career NFL statistics
- Games played: 18
- Tackles: 16
- Blocked punts: 2
- Stats at Pro Football Reference

John Raymond McLaughlin (born November 13, 1975) is an American former professional football player who was a defensive end for two seasons for the Tampa Bay Buccaneers in 1999 and 2000.

== Early life ==
John Raymond McLaughlin was born on November 13, 1975, in Cleveland, Ohio. He attended William S. Hart High School in Santa Clarita, California. He went to college at Notre Dame before transferring to California.

== Professional career ==
Pre-draft measurables
| Height | Weight | Arm length | Hand span | 40-yard dash | 10-yard split | 20-yard split | 20-yard shuttle | Three-cone drill | Vertical jump | Broad jump | Bench press |
|---|---|---|---|---|---|---|---|---|---|---|---|
| 6 ft 3 in (1.91 m) | 247 lb (112 kg) | 32 in (0.81 m) | 9 1/4 in (0.23 m) | 4.72 s | 1.66 s | 2.74 s | 4.15 s | 6.84 s | 31 in (0.79 m) | 8 ft 11 in (2.72 m) | 18 reps |
All values come from NFL Scouting Combine

McLaughlin was selected in fifth round of the 1999 NFL draft with the 150th overall pick by the Tampa Bay Buccaneers. He mainly just played special teams in 1999 but he was one of their top performers on punts and kickoffs recording 13 tackles. He played in 12 games in the 1999 season. During the 2000 season, he had a knee infection that kept him from playing many games. He did have a blocked punt in 2000. In the 2000 season, he played 6 games. During the 2001 pre-season, he was released with an injury settlement. After the pre-season of 2001 he did not play another NFL game.
