= Tom Osborne (American football, born 1960) =

American football player and coach

Biographical details
- Born: September 27, 1960 (age 66); Tacoma, Washington, U.S.
- Education: Washington State – B.S., M.A

Playing career
- 1979–1983: Washington State
- Position: Wide Receiver

Coaching career (HC unless noted)
- 1983–1985: Washington State (GA)
- 1986–1992: Portland State (RB)
- 1993–1994: Boise State (RB)(TE)(RC)
- 1995–2000: Oregon (ST)(TE)(RC)
- 2001–2006: Arizona State (AHC)(ST)(TE)
- 2007-2016: Oregon (ST)(TE)

Accomplishments and honors

Awards
- Special Teams Coordinator of the Year (2003)

Tom Osborne (born September 27, 1960) is an American football coach. He was the special teams coordinator and tight ends coach for the University of Oregon football team.
