= 1998 Washington State Cougars football team =

American college football season

1998 Washington State Cougars football
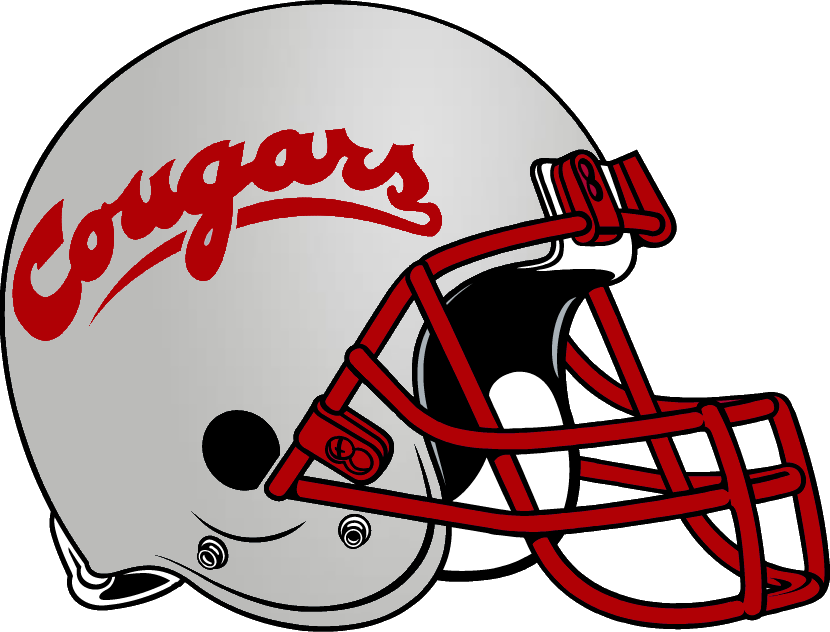
- Conference: Pacific-10 Conference
- Record: 3–8 (0–8 Pac-10)
- Head coach: Mike Price (10th season)
- Offensive coordinator: Jim McDonell (5th season)
- Offensive scheme: Spread
- Defensive coordinator: Bill Doba (5th season)
- Base defense: 4–3
- Home stadium: Martin Stadium

1998 Pacific-10 Conference football standings
	Conf.			Overall
Team	W		L	W		L
No. 8 UCLA $	8	–	0	10	–	2
No. 4 Arizona	7	–	1	12	–	1
Oregon	5	–	3	8	–	4
USC	5	–	3	8	–	5
Washington	4	–	4	6	–	6
Arizona State	4	–	4	5	–	6
California	3	–	5	5	–	6
Oregon State	2	–	6	5	–	6
Stanford	2	–	6	3	–	8
Washington State	0	–	8	3	–	8
$ – BCS representative as conference champion; Rankings from AP Poll

The 1998 Washington State Cougars football team represented Washington State University in the 1998 NCAA Division I-A football season. Head coach Mike Price was in his tenth season, and the team played its home games on campus at Martin Stadium in Pullman, Washington.

== Schedule ==
Date	Time	Opponent	Site	TV	Result	Attendance	Source
September 5	3:30 pm	Illinois*	Martin Stadium; Pullman, WA	FSN	W 20–13	31,568	
September 12	6:00 pm	at Boise State*	Bronco Stadium; Boise, ID		W 33–21	26,189	
September 19	2:00 pm	Idaho*	Martin Stadium; Pullman, WA (Battle of the Palouse)		W 24–16	36,770	
September 26	4:00 pm	at California	California Memorial Stadium; Berkeley, CA	ABC	L 14–24	32,000	
October 3	12:30 pm	at No. 4 UCLA	Rose Bowl; Pasadena, CA	ABC	L 9–38	67,210	
October 10	2:00 pm	No. 15 Oregon^{†}	Martin Stadium; Pullman, WA		L 29–51	37,196	
October 17	7:15 pm	USC	Martin Stadium; Pullman, WA	FSN	L 14–42	31,178	
October 31	2:00 pm	Arizona State	Martin Stadium; Pullman, WA		L 28–38	34,039	
November 7	6:00 pm	at No. 10 Arizona	Arizona Stadium; Tucson, AZ		L 7–41	47,761	
November 14	12:30 pm	at Stanford	Stanford Stadium; Stanford, CA		L 28–38	30,418	
November 21	12:30 pm	Washington	Martin Stadium; Pullman, WA (Apple Cup)	ABC	L 9–16	37,251	
*Non-conference game; ^{†}Homecoming; Rankings from AP Poll released prior to the game; All times are in Pacific time
