= John Welbourn =

American football player (born 1976)

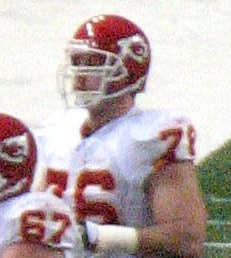
- Welbourn with the Kansas City Chiefs in 2006

No. 76
- Position: Guard / Tackle

Personal information
- Born: March 30, 1976 (age 50); Torrance, California, U.S.
- Listed height: 6 ft 5 in (1.96 m)
- Listed weight: 310 lb (141 kg)

Career information
- High school: Palos Verdes Peninsula (Rolling Hills Estates, California)
- College: California (1994–1998)
- NFL draft: 1999: 4th round, 97th overall pick

Career history
- Philadelphia Eagles (1999–2003); Kansas City Chiefs (2004–2007); New England Patriots (2008)*
- * Offseason or practice squad member only

Awards and highlights
- First-team All-Pac-10 (1998)

Career NFL statistics
- Games played: 103
- Games started: 95
- Fumble recoveries: 3
- Stats at Pro Football Reference

John Russell Welbourn (born March 30, 1976) is an American former professional football player who was an offensive tackle and guard in the National Football League (NFL). He was selected by the Philadelphia Eagles in the fourth round of the 1999 NFL draft. He played college football for the California Golden Bears. Welbourn was also a member of the Kansas City Chiefs and New England Patriots. He is now the creator and operator of Power Athlete HQ.

== Early life ==
Welbourn attended Palos Verdes High School and Palos Verdes Peninsula High School in Rolling Hills Estates, California where he lettered in football and track. He attended the University of California, Berkeley, on a football scholarship. He graduated in four years with a B.A. in Rhetoric. He then went on to do his masters work in Education.

== Professional career ==
Pre-draft measurables
Height	Weight	Arm length	Hand span	40-yard dash	10-yard split	20-yard split	20-yard shuttle	Three-cone drill	Vertical jump	Broad jump	Bench press
6 ft 5 1/8 in (1.96 m)	317 lb (144 kg)	32 1/4 in (0.82 m)	9 in (0.23 m)	5.09 s	1.80 s	2.98 s	4.88 s	8.14 s	30.0 in (0.76 m)	8 ft 3 in (2.51 m)	24 reps
All values from NFL Combine

=== Philadelphia Eagles ===
Welbourn came into the National Football League in 1999 after being selected by the Philadelphia Eagles with the second pick in the fourth round of the 1999 NFL draft. He went on to start his first professional game versus the Arizona Cardinals. He was injured at the end of the second quarter and was placed on injured reserve. He came back the following year and started all 16 regular season games for the Eagles. He continued to play for the Eagles as a starter at left guard through the 2003 season.

=== Kansas City Chiefs ===
Welbourn was traded to the Kansas City Chiefs for a 2004 fifth round and 2005 third round draft picks. He went on to start at right tackle for the Chiefs for the 2004, 2005 and 2006 seasons. In 2005, he was suspended for four games for violation of the NFL's substance abuse policy, and in 2006 he received a six-week suspension for a second violation. In 2007 he started all 16 games for the Chiefs at right guard. He was released at the end of the season with one year left on his contract.

=== New England Patriots ===
On August 4, 2008, Welbourn was signed by the New England Patriots. He was released on August 31.

== After NFL ==
Welbourn is now the creator and operator of Power Athlete HQ and travels the world lecturing on performance and nutrition. Since retiring from the NFL in 2009, he has consulted and trained athletes in MLB, NHL, NFL, CrossFit and the Olympics. He has also worked in the same capacity for Naval Special Warfare and the U.S Army, teaching performance focused training.
