= Akili Smith =

American gridiron football player (born 1975)

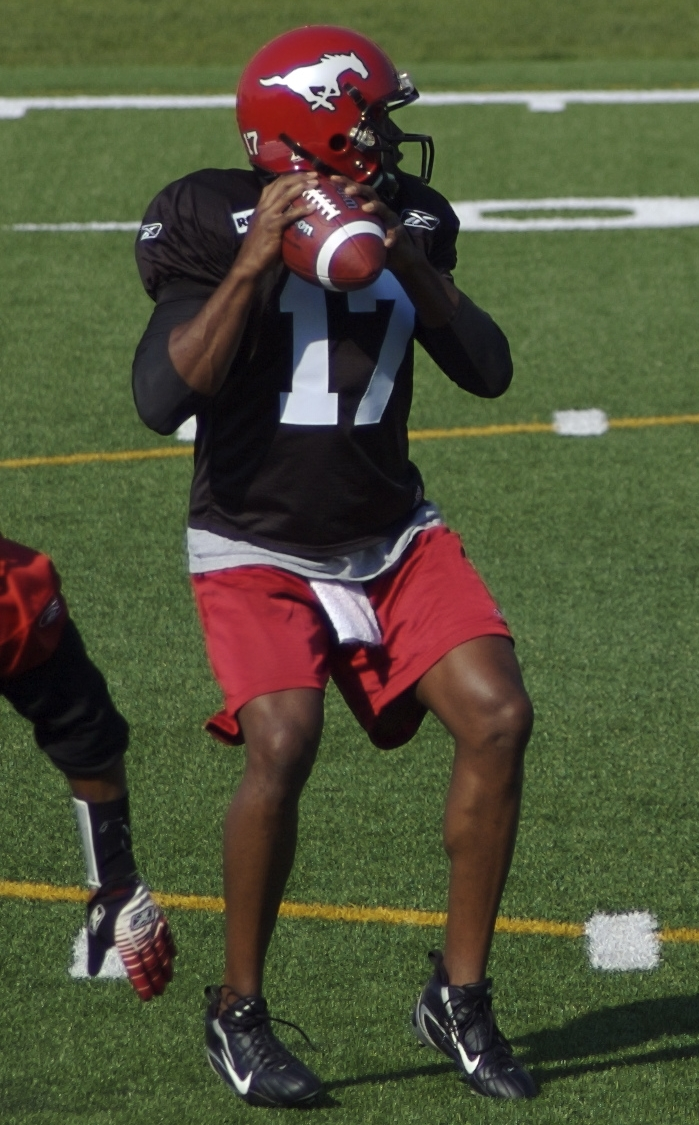
- Smith with the Calgary Stampeders in 2007

No. 11, 17
- Position: Quarterback

Personal information
- Born: August 21, 1975 (age 51); San Diego, California, U.S.
- Listed height: 6 ft 3 in (1.91 m)
- Listed weight: 220 lb (100 kg)

Career information
- High school: Lincoln (San Diego)
- College: Grossmont (1995–1996); Oregon (1997–1998)
- NFL draft: 1999: 1st round, 3rd overall pick

Career history
- Cincinnati Bengals (1999–2002); Green Bay Packers (2003)*; Tampa Bay Buccaneers (2005)*; Frankfurt Galaxy (2005); Calgary Stampeders (2007)
- * Offseason or practice squad member only

Awards and highlights
- Pac-10 Co-Offensive Player of the Year (1998); First-team All-Pac-10 (1998)

Career NFL statistics
- Passing attempts: 461
- Passing completions: 215
- Completion percentage: 46.6%
- TD–INT: 5–13
- Passing yards: 2,212
- Passer rating: 52.8
- Stats at Pro Football Reference

Kabisa Akili Maradufu Smith (born August 21, 1975) is an American former professional football quarterback who played in the National Football League (NFL) for four seasons with the Cincinnati Bengals. He played college football for the Oregon Ducks, winning Pac-10 Co-Offensive Player of the Year and receiving first-team All-Pac-10 honors in 1998. Smith was selected third overall of the 1999 NFL draft, but his tenure was cut short by inconsistent play and questions over his work ethic. Following his departure from the Bengals in 2002, he played for the Frankfurt Galaxy of NFL Europe and the Calgary Stampeders of the Canadian Football League (CFL).

== Early life ==
Given the name Kabisa Akili Maradufu Smith (in Swahili, "kabisa" means "completely", "akili" means "mind", and "maradufu" means "double" or "a Gemini twin") by his parents Glorida Bryant and Ray Smith, Akili Smith was born in San Diego, California. Smith attended Abraham Lincoln High School in San Diego, the alma mater of Marcus Allen and Terrell Davis.

Smith was named a Parade Magazine All-American and signed a letter of intent to play football at San Diego State, but low test scores prevented him from enrolling there to play football.

Smith was drafted by the Pittsburgh Pirates in the seventh round (206th overall) of the 1993 Major League Baseball draft. He played for the Gulf Coast League Pirates of the Gulf Coast League from 1993 to 1994, and the Erie SeaWolves of the New York–Penn League in 1995.

== College career ==
=== Grossmont College ===
After he was unable to play at San Diego State, Smith attended Grossmont College, a junior college in the San Diego area, for two years. At Grossmont, he played under head coach Dave Jordan. Over his junior college career, Smith threw 49 touchdown passes and 18 interceptions, and he became one of the top junior-college quarterback recruits in the country.

=== Oregon ===
Smith transferred to the University of Oregon, where he played for the Oregon Ducks under head coach Mike Bellotti. He joined the Ducks in 1997 and shared quarterback duties with Jason Maas. In his first season at Oregon, Smith completed 104 of 190 passes for 1,298 yards, 12 touchdowns, and six interceptions, while also rushing for 195 yards and two touchdowns.

As a senior in 1998, Smith became one of the most productive quarterbacks in Oregon history. In the regular season, he completed 191 of 325 passes for 3,307 yards, 30 touchdowns, and seven interceptions, while leading the Pacific-10 Conference in passing yards and touchdown passes. He also led the NCAA in passing yards per attempt.

Including Oregon's Aloha Bowl appearance against Colorado, Smith finished the 1998 season with 3,763 passing yards, 32 touchdown passes, and eight interceptions on 371 attempts. He also recorded 3,947 yards of total offense. Smith was named second-team All-American and Pac-10 Conference Co-Offensive Player of the Year. His senior season helped move him into consideration as one of the top quarterback prospects for the 1999 NFL draft.

== Professional career ==
Pre-draft measurables
Height	Weight	Arm length	Hand span	40-yard dash	10-yard split	20-yard split	20-yard shuttle	Three-cone drill	Vertical jump	Broad jump	Wonderlic
6 ft 2 3/4 in (1.90 m)	227 lb (103 kg)	32 1/4 in (0.82 m)	9 3/4 in (0.25 m)	4.72 s	1.63 s	2.73 s	4.29 s	6.99 s	34 in (0.86 m)	9 ft 6 in (2.90 m)	26
All values from NFL Combine

=== Cincinnati Bengals ===
In the 1999 NFL draft, a year in which five quarterbacks were drafted in the first round, Smith was the third quarterback and third player selected overall, by the Cincinnati Bengals. Smith scored a 16 out of 50 on the NFL-administered Wonderlic test when he first took the exam in 1998. His agent Leigh Steinberg hired a tutor to help improve his score for the 1999 scouting combine, and he scored a 37 on the second try.

Prior to the draft, there was an effort by New Orleans Saints' head coach Mike Ditka and management to get the Cincinnati Bengals' high draft position so the Saints could get Ricky Williams. The final offer, which was refused by Bengals management, was for nine draft picks, several extra in that year as well as many the next year. Instead of taking the trade, the Bengals stayed with their initial decision to draft Smith, who, while athletic (he had also played two years of minor-league baseball and ran a 4.66 40-yard dash), was still largely unproven, having only succeeded at the college level for one season.

Smith missed a large portion of training camp during his rookie season in 1999 due to contract disputes. On August 24, 1999, he signed a seven-year contract worth up to $56 million with a $10.8 million signing bonus.

Despite showing athleticism in his early games, he failed to grasp the Bengals playbook fully and never established himself with the team. His offensive coordinator from 2001 to 2002, Bob Bratkowski, said Smith "wasn't as diligent as he should have been" regarding his film and playbook study habits. During the four years he was with the Bengals, he started in only 17 games and threw just five touchdown passes and 13 interceptions, eventually leading to his release on May 31, 2003, after riding the bench mostly during the previous two years.

=== Later career ===
In 2003, Smith tried out for the Green Bay Packers, as Brett Favre's backup. He was, however, unsuccessful there and was later released. In 2005, he was released by the Tampa Bay Buccaneers after a stint in NFL Europe where he started four games for the Frankfurt Galaxy.

On April 28, 2007, Smith signed a two-year contract with the Calgary Stampeders of the Canadian Football League, where he was expected to compete for the starting quarterback position with another former NFL player, Henry Burris. After an unimpressive debut in an exhibition game against the Edmonton Eskimos, Smith played well in the final exhibition against the Saskatchewan Roughriders. Though listed going into the game as the third-string quarterback, he completed three touchdown passes in only one half of play, including one to former Kansas City Chiefs wide receiver Marc Boerigter.

== Career statistics ==
Legend
**Bold**	Career high

=== NFL ===
Year	Team	GP	Passing									
Year	Team	GP	Cmp	Att	Pct	Yds	Avg	Lng	TD	Int	Rtg	Fum
1999	CIN	7	80	153	52.3	805	**5.3**	39	2	**6**	55.6	2
2000	CIN	12	**118**	**267**	44.2	**1,253**	4.7	**46**	**3**	**6**	52.9	**10**
2001	CIN	2	5	8	**62.5**	37	4.6	14	0	0	**73.4**	0
2002	CIN	1	12	33	36.4	117	3.6	24	0	1	34.5	1
Career		22	215	461	46.6	2,212	4.8	46	5	13	52.8	13

=== College ===
Season	Passing						Rushing		
Season	Cmp	Att	Yds	Pct	TD	Int	Att	Yds	TD
1997	104	190	1,298	54.7	12	6	**87**	**195**	2
1998	**191**	**325**	**3,307**	**58.8**	**30**	**7**	74	183	**3**
Total	323	571	5,148	56.6	45	15	171	367	6

== Post-football career ==
After retiring from football, Smith was the quarterbacks coach for Grossmont College. Smith was a deacon at a Missionary Baptist church and played football for "God's House", a flag football team.

In March 2010, Smith joined the California Golden Bears's football staff as a graduate assistant to work with the offense. Cal head coach Jeff Tedford previously coached Smith at Oregon when he was offensive coordinator.

In 2012, Smith took over as quarterbacks coach for St. Augustine High School in San Diego. Smith planned to finish the college degree that he started at the University of Oregon. As of September 2014, Smith was coaching football for The Bishop's School in La Jolla, California, and was still 16 credits away from graduating from Oregon.

In June 2020, Smith was hired onto the coaching staff at Maranatha High School in Pasadena, California.

== Personal life ==
Smith's son, Akili Smith Jr., is a top quarterback recruit in the 2025 recruiting class and is committed to play at Oregon.
