= 1998–99 NCAA football bowl games =

College football postseason game series

- Season: 1998
- Number of bowls: 22
- Bowl games: December 19, 1998 – January 4, 1999
- National Championship: Fiesta Bowl
- Location of Championship: Sun Devil Stadium; Tempe, AZ
- Champions: Tennessee
Bowl record by conference
Conference	Bowls	Record	Number of teams in final AP poll
SEC	8	4–4 (0.500)	7
Big 12	7	3–4 (0.429)	5
Big Ten	5	5–0 (1.000)	5
ACC	5	2–3 (0.400)	3
Pac-10	5	1–4 (0.200)	2
Big East	4	2–2 (0.500)	3
WAC	4	2–2 (0.500)	1
CUSA	3	1–2 (0.333)	1
Big West	1	1–0 (1.000)	0
MAC	1	1–0 (1.000)	0

The 1998–99 NCAA football bowl games concluded the 1998 NCAA Division I-A football season. In the first year of the Bowl Championship Series (BCS) era, Tennessee defeated Florida State in the 1999 Fiesta Bowl, designated as the BCS National Championship Game for the 1998 season.

A total of 22 bowl games were played between December 19, 1998, and January 4, 1999, by 44 bowl-eligible teams. Two new bowl games were established in 1998–99: the Oahu Bowl and the Music City Bowl.

== Non-BCS bowls ==
Date	Time	Game	Site	Result	Ref.
Dec 19	6:00 PM	Las Vegas Bowl	Sam Boyd Stadium; Las Vegas, NV	North Carolina 20, San Diego State 13	
Dec 23	8:00 PM	Motor City Bowl	Pontiac Silverdome; Pontiac, MI	Marshall 48, Louisville 29	
Dec 25	3:30 PM	Aloha Bowl	Aloha Stadium; Honolulu, HI	Colorado 51, No. 21 Oregon 43	
Dec 25	8:30 PM	Oahu Bowl	Aloha Stadium; Honolulu, HI	No. 16 Air Force 45, Washington 25	
Dec 26	8:00 PM	Insight.com Bowl	Arizona Stadium; Tucson, AZ	No. 23 Missouri 34, West Virginia 31	
Dec 29	5:00 PM	Music City Bowl	Vanderbilt Stadium; Nashville, TN	Virginia Tech 38, Alabama 7	
Dec 29	7:30 PM	MicronPC Bowl	Pro Player Stadium; Miami Gardens, FL	No. 24 Miami (FL) 46, NC State 23	
Dec 29	8:30 PM	Alamo Bowl	Alamodome; San Antonio, TX	Purdue 37, No. 4 Kansas State 34	
Dec 30	3:00 PM	Humanitarian Bowl	Bronco Stadium; Boise, ID	Idaho 42, Southern Miss 35	
Dec 30	8:00 PM	Holiday Bowl	Qualcomm Stadium; San Diego, CA	No. 5 Arizona 23, No. 14 Nebraska 20	
Dec 31	1:30 PM	Liberty Bowl	Liberty Bowl Memorial Stadium; Memphis, TN	No. 10 Tulane 41, BYU 27	
Dec 31	2:00 PM	Sun Bowl	Sun Bowl; El Paso, TX	TCU 28, USC 19	
Dec 31	5:00 PM	Peach Bowl	Georgia Dome; Atlanta, GA	No. 19 Georgia 35, No. 13 Virginia 33	
Dec 31	8:30 PM	Independence Bowl	Independence Stadium; Shreveport, LA	Ole Miss 35, Texas Tech 18	
Jan 1	11:00 AM	Outback Bowl	Raymond James Stadium; Tampa, FL	No. 22 Penn State 26, Kentucky 14	
Jan 1	11:00 AM	Cotton Bowl Classic	Cotton Bowl; Dallas, TX	No. 20 Texas 38, No. 25 Mississippi State 11	
Jan 1	12:30 PM	Gator Bowl	Alltel Stadium; Jacksonville, FL	No. 12 Georgia Tech 35, No. 17 Notre Dame 28	
Jan 1	1:00 PM	Florida Citrus Bowl	Florida Citrus Bowl; Orlando, FL	No. 15 Michigan 45, No. 11 Arkansas 31	
Rankings from AP Poll released prior to the game. All times are in Eastern Time.

== BCS bowls ==
Date	Time	Game	Site	Result	Ref.
Jan 1	4:30 PM	Rose Bowl	Rose Bowl; Pasadena, CA	No. 9 Wisconsin 38, No. 6 UCLA 31	
Jan 1	8:30 PM	Sugar Bowl	Louisiana Superdome; New Orleans, LA	No. 3 Ohio State 24, No. 8 Texas A&M 14	
Jan 2	8:00 PM	Orange Bowl	Miami Orange Bowl; Miami, FL	No. 7 Florida 31, No. 18 Syracuse 10	
Jan 4	8:00 PM	Fiesta Bowl (BCS National Championship Game)	Sun Devil Stadium; Tempe, AZ	No. 1 Tennessee 23, No. 2 Florida State 16	
Rankings from AP Poll released prior to the game. All times are in Eastern Time.
