= 1998 Music City Bowl =

1998 American General Music City Bowl
- 1st Music City Bowl
Alabama Crimson Tide	Virginia Tech Hokies
(7–4)	(8–3)
SEC	Big East
7	38
Head coach: Mike DuBose	Head coach: Frank Beamer
	AP / Coaches / BCS; NR / 24 / NR
	1	2	3	4	Total
Alabama	0	7	0	0	7
Virginia Tech	7	3	14	14	38
- Date: December 29, 1998
- Season: 1998
- Stadium: Vanderbilt Stadium
- Location: Nashville, Tennessee
- MVP: DE Corey Moore (Va. Tech)
- Favorite: Virginia Tech by 5
- National anthem: Larry Carlton
- Referee: Hal Dowden (Big 12)
- Halftime show: Lorrie Morgan, Steve Winwood, Million Dollar Band and The Marching Virginians
- Attendance: 41,600
- Payout: US$750,000 per team

United States TV coverage
- Network: ESPN
- Announcers: Rich Waltz, Rod Gilmore, Holly Rowe
- Nielsen ratings: 2.4

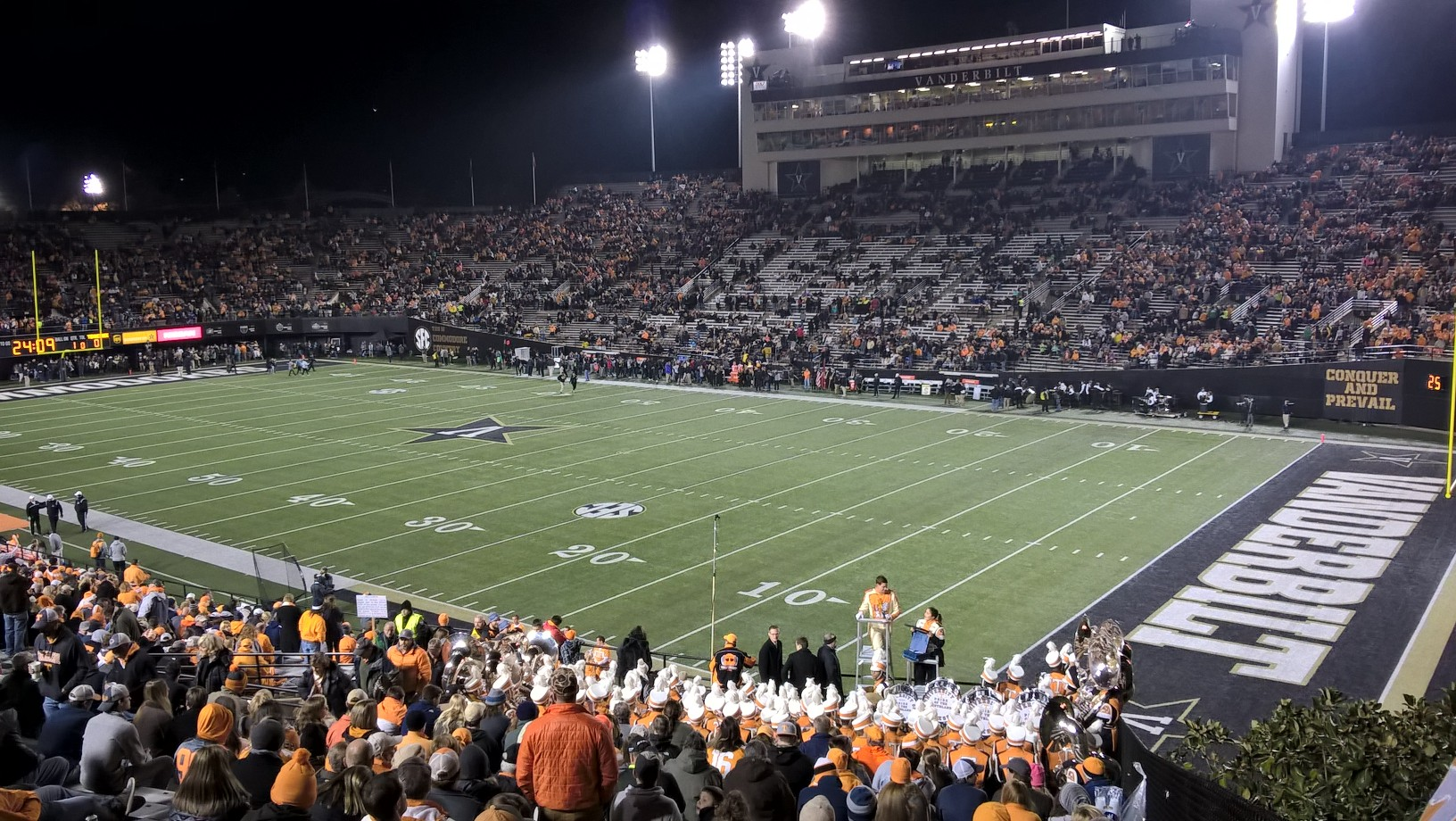
Vanderbilt Stadium in Nashville, Tennessee, hosted the inaugural Music City Bowl.

The 1998 Music City Bowl was a postseason college football game between the Alabama Crimson Tide and Virginia Tech Hokies. It was the inaugural competition of the annual Music City Bowl. The University of Alabama represented the Southeastern Conference (SEC) and Virginia Tech represented the Big East. The game was the final competition for each team in the 1998 college football season. The game ended as a 38–7 victory for Virginia Tech.

The Alabama Crimson Tide, had gone 7–4 during the regular season. Virginia Tech's 8–3 record during the 1998 college football regular season was good enough to earn it a bid to the inaugural Music City Bowl game.

The 1998 Music City Bowl kicked off on December 29, 1998, in Nashville, Tennessee. The weather at kickoff was "horrid," as rain and sleet mixed in freezing temperatures. The game's early going was marked by defense as both teams struggled against the inclement weather. Virginia Tech scored first off a 43-yard touchdown scramble by quarterback Al Clark. Clark's touchdown provided the game's only points until the second quarter, when Alabama evened the score at 7–7 with a five-yard touchdown pass. The Hokies struck back with a field goal before halftime and took a tenuous 10–7 lead into the second half.

In that half, the Tech offense finally got rolling. The Hokies scored 14 points in both the third and fourth quarters, ending the game on an uncontested 28–0 run. Alabama's offense was stifled throughout by effective pressure from Tech defensive end Corey Moore, and Tech was able to turn several fumbles and interceptions by the Crimson Tide into points on the scoreboard. The 31 point victory margin was the largest victory margin in Virginia Tech bowl game history and that remains true as of the end of the 2024 season. Moore was named the game's most valuable player. The two teams did not meet again until the 2009 Chick-fil-A Kickoff Game on September 5, 2009.

== Team selection ==
The first Music City Bowl was scheduled for 1998, but the bowl's beginnings dated from 1996, when city officials and local companies came up with the idea for the game. Their plan developed through 1997, when financing was obtained and the NCAA approved the bowl game. Initial plans anticipated matching a Southeastern Conference team against one from the Mid-American Conference. Prior to the start of the 1998 college football season, Music City Bowl officials signed an agreement with the SEC to select the conference's sixth bowl-eligible team. The Music City Bowl's other spot was left for an at-large bid, though officials met several times with Big East commissioner Mike Tranghese in an effort to reach a contract. An agreement pledging the Big East's No. 4 bowl-eligible team to the game was not reached until 1999.

=== Alabama ===
The Alabama Crimson Tide entered the 1998 college football season after a 1997 season that included a 4–7 record and no bowl game appearance. Heading into the season, the Tide were unranked nationally and were picked to finish fifth in the SEC West in the annual poll of media members who cover SEC football. Most voters expected Alabama to show little improvement over its performance in the previous year.

Alabama's first game of the season was against Brigham Young University and was played at a renovated Bryant–Denny Stadium that boasted more than 80,000 seats and a new Jumbotron. In that game, Alabama running back Shaun Alexander scored a school-record five rushing touchdowns and Alabama won, 38–34, breaking a four-game losing streak that ended the 1997 season. One week later, Alabama repeated its first-game success with a 42–7 win over Vanderbilt. After a bye week, Alabama traveled to Arkansas to play the Arkansas Razorbacks. Alabama had risen to No. 22 in the country by virtue of its two wins, but the Crimson Tide's first road game of the season resulted in its first defeat, as Alabama lost, 42–6. One week later, Alabama suffered its first home loss of the season, a 16–10 defeat at the hands of Florida.

After the Florida loss, Alabama's senior starting quarterback, John David Phillips, was replaced by freshman Andrew Zow. With Zow as the new starter, Alabama proceeded to win its next two games: 20–17 against Ole Miss and 23–22 against East Carolina. On October 24, Zow endured his first loss as the team's starting quarterback when Alabama was defeated, 35–18, by eventual SEC (and national) champion Tennessee. Alabama rebounded from the loss by reeling off two more wins: 30–20 against Southern Miss and an upset 22–16 win over LSU, in which the Crimson Tide scored 15 points in 144 seconds.

After those two wins, Alabama had a 6–3 record heading into the final two weeks of the regular season. In the second-to-last week, the Crimson Tide were defeated, 26–14, by Mississippi State. In the final week of the season, Alabama faced traditional in-state rival Auburn in the annual Iron Bowl game. Reversing the outcome of the previous year's game, Alabama eked out an upset 31–17 victory to end the regular season.

Following the Iron Bowl, Alabama's bowl destination was unclear due to the SEC championship game, which determined the conference champion on December 5. Until then, speculation centered on Alabama potentially attending any of four games: the Peach Bowl, Independence Bowl, Sun Bowl, or Music City Bowl. By the time of the championship game, the Sun Bowl had been eliminated as an option. After Tennessee won the SEC championship game and a bid to the Fiesta Bowl, other teams were selected by the Peach Bowl and Independence Bowl, leaving Alabama to be selected for the inaugural Music City Bowl. The choice was made official on December 6, and Alabama began preparing for its matchup with Virginia Tech.

=== Virginia Tech ===
Virginia Tech began the 1998 season after going 7–5 the previous year, including a 42–3 blowout loss to North Carolina in the 1998 Gator Bowl. Prior to the 1998 season, the annual preseason poll of Big East football media picked Virginia Tech to finish fourth in the Big East, and West Virginia was favored to win the conference. Most pre-season attention was focused on whether Tech would perform well enough to attend a sixth consecutive bowl game at the season's end.

The Hokies' first two games brought success for Virginia Tech: At home, they defeated East Carolina, 38–3, and away, they beat Clemson, 37–0. After the blowout win in Death Valley, Virginia Tech traveled to the Orange Bowl, home of the Miami Hurricanes. By virtue of their two season-opening wins, the Hokies were ranked No. 21 in the coaches' poll, and they improved that ranking with a win in the first overtime football game in Virginia Tech history, 27–20.

During the overtime win, Virginia Tech starting quarterback Al Clark was injured. The injury left him unable to play in Tech's next game, a contest against the Pittsburgh Panthers. Clark's absence didn't distract the Hokies, who won, 27–7. After the win against Pittsburgh, Virginia Tech traveled to Boston to play Boston College. The Hokies shut out the Boston College Eagles, 17–0, boosting their national ranking to No. 10 in the coaches' poll on the basis of Tech's first 5–0 start since 1967.

Following the Boston College victory, the Hokies faced lightly regarded and winless Temple University. The Temple Owls had lost eight consecutive games, were 0–26 in Big East road games, and had lost 10 players to injury since the season began. But although the Owls were 35-point underdogs to the Hokies, they managed one of the biggest upsets in college football history when they beat Virginia Tech in Lane Stadium, 28–24.

Virginia Tech rebounded from the upset loss to Temple by shutting out the University of Alabama Birmingham, 41–0, then beating No. 21 West Virginia, 27–13. After the two wins, the Hokies had a 7–1 record, were ranked No. 16 in the AP Poll, and traveled to the Carrier Dome to play Syracuse University. In New York, Syracuse gave the Hokies their second loss of the season, 28–26. The loss came despite the presence of Al Clark, who had returned from injury prior to the West Virginia game. Tech again rebounded from a losing effort, this time by defeating Rutgers, 47–7. But in their final regular-season game, the Hokies lost to Virginia in the annual competition for the Commonwealth Cup, 36–32. Tech led by 22 points at halftime, but Virginia quarterback Aaron Brooks led a comeback that won the game for Virginia with two minutes remaining in the game.

The loss to Virginia brought Virginia Tech to an 8–3 regular-season record, something Tech coach Frank Beamer said was better than he expected at the season's start. Despite that sentiment, most fans and supporters pointed to the fact that in all of Virginia Tech's losses, the deciding points came late in the fourth quarter and near the end of the game. Only three plays separated Tech from an undefeated 11–0 record. Tech's bowl destination was unclear immediately after the Virginia loss. The Music City Bowl seemed likely, but the Micron PC Bowl, Insight.com Bowl, and Sun Bowl also were possibilities. Virginia Tech officials preferred the Music City Bowl because of its proximity to Virginia, and bowl officials selected the Hokies on November 30.

== Pregame buildup ==
The inaugural Music City bowl marked the first meeting of Alabama and Virginia Tech on the football field since 1979, when the No. 1 Crimson Tide defeated Virginia Tech, 31–7. Prior to the Music City Bowl, Alabama had defeated Virginia Tech in all 10 meetings of the two schools, and some Virginia Tech players cited that record as motivation in the game. For American General, sponsoring the game was part of an overall marketing strategy intended to boost the company's national profile. Spread bettors favored Virginia Tech to win the game by five points. In exchange for appearing in the game, each team received $750,000, minus expenses. Media coverage in the weeks leading up to the game focused on Virginia Tech's tough defense and Alabama's recovery from NCAA-imposed sanctions.

=== Ticket sales ===
Both schools sold their allotments of Music City Bowl tickets rapidly. Virginia Tech, which was attending its sixth consecutive bowl game, sold more than 9,000 tickets in the first week of sales. Alabama's tickets were primarily distributed to season-ticket holders. Of Alabama's 12,000 bowl tickets, 10,000 were reserved for season-ticket holders and only 2,000 were available for open purchase. These were sold on the first day of sales. By December 9, both Alabama and the game itself had sold their entire allotment of tickets. Virginia Tech had just 200 tickets remaining, and they were sold by the 10th. In an interview with a local newspaper, an official at the Virginia Tech ticket office indicated that demand for tickets was so great that "We could have sold at least a couple thousand more. ... We were inundated for 3-4 days, and then, once Alabama was selected to play in the game, we got a lot more calls, and we were sold out." Some fans were able to obtain tickets at the game via purchases from ticket scalpers.

Demand for tickets by Alabama fans was so great that the Alabama ticket office accidentally oversold its allotment of tickets. The office neglected to limit purchases on the forms sent to season-ticket holders, and the office received more than 25,000 orders for its 12,500-ticket allotment. An additional 2,000 tickets were given to Alabama, but the school still had to send out more than 10,000 refunds. Alabama's athletics director was heavily criticized for overselling the ticket allotment and for limiting ticket distribution to fans who had contributed large amounts of money to the athletics department. A group of fans disgruntled at the ticket distribution process eventually levied a class-action lawsuit against the athletic director, claiming contract violations.

=== Offensive matchups ===
==== Alabama offense ====
Despite having an offense that featured star running back Shaun Alexander, Alabama's offensive strategy revolved around a passing offense more than a running one. During the regular season, Alabama passed for 2,435 yards but only ran for 1,272 yards. The Crimson Tide averaged 22.9 points per game, 116 rushing yards per game, and 221.4 passing yards per game.

A large reason for Alabama's success passing the ball came from the emergence of freshman quarterback Andrew Zow, who assumed starting duties during the season. Zow completed 143 of 256 passes for 1,969 yards, 11 touchdowns, and seven interceptions. One of his favorite passing targets was Alexander, who caught 26 passes for 385 yards and four touchdowns in addition to his 1,178 rushing yards and 13 touchdowns. Alexander averaged 116 yards per game on the ground. Wide receiver Quincy Jackson was the team's leading passing target. He caught 48 passes for 621 yards four touchdowns. Fellow wide receiver Michael Vaughn also was a favorite passing target. He caught 34 passes for 403 yards and four touchdowns in addition to performing kick-return duties during the regular season.

==== Virginia Tech offense ====
Virginia Tech's offense during the regular season was worse than the average in the NCAA during 1998. The Hokies finished 88th among 112 Division I-A teams in total offense, recording 316.7 yards per game. Tech averaged 31.2 points per game.

Part of the reason for their lackluster performance was repeated injuries to starting quarterback Al Clark, who missed three regular-season games due to injuries. Heading into the Music City Bowl, he was recovering from a rib injury suffered in Tech's final regular-season game. Despite the missed games, Clark completed 72 of 148 passes for 1,050 passing yards, nine touchdowns, and five interceptions for the 1998 season. On the ground, Virginia Tech running backs Lamont Pegues and Shyrone Stith combined for 1,444 rushing yards and 10 touchdowns. Together, they averaged 178 yards per game on the ground. Another bright spot on the Virginia Tech offense was kicker Shayne Graham, who was named a first-team All Big East selection. He kicked 37 extra points and was successful on 22 field goal attempts, earning the Hokies 103 points in total.

=== Defensive matchups ===
==== Alabama defense ====
Defensively, Alabama allowed an average of 147.7 rushing yards and 369 total yards per game. In total, Alabama's defense intercepted 12 passes during the regular season and sacked opposing quarterbacks 25 times.

Alabama's leading tackler was linebacker Trevis Smith, who had 80 tackles during the regular season. This figure included 2.5 sacks and 14.5 other tackles for loss. Smith also broke up three passes, recovered two fumbles, and forced one. Alabama's second-leading tackler, linebacker Travis Carroll, fractured his shoulder blade in the Crimson Tide's second-to-last regular-season game and was not available for the Music City Bowl. Carroll had 76 tackles during the regular season.

Cornerback Fernando Bryant led the team's pass defense. He finished the season with 51 tackles and two interceptions. He was supported by strong safety Marcus Spencer, who led the Crimson Tide in interceptions with four. Alabama's sole All-Southeastern Conference selection was punter Daniel Pope, a senior who averaged a school-record 44 yards per kick during the regular season and was second nationally in net punting at 40.8 yards per kick. Of his 60 punts, 20 were inside the opponents' 20-yard line. None were blocked.

==== Virginia Tech defense ====
At the conclusion of the regular season, the Virginia Tech defense was one of the best in the country. It was No. 4 in scoring defense (allowing 12.9 points per game), No. 11 in rushing defense (allowing 102.2 yards per game), and No. 7 in total defense (284.9 yards per game). The Hokies had 23 interceptions during the regular season, second-most in the country and behind only USC's 24 interceptions. The Hokies also found success on special teams defense. In total, Tech blocked ten kicks during the regular season: six punts, two field-goal attempts and two point-after tries. Tech's defense also scored 52 points: eight touchdowns, a safety and a two-point runback of an intercepted conversion pass.

The Hokie defense was led by defensive end Corey Moore, who was named the Big East defensive player of the year for 1998. He led the conference in sacks during the regular season, and finished with 14. Cornerback Loren Johnson was named to the first-team All Big East team with Pierson Prioleau, who had 61 tackles and returned a blocked field goal 52 yards in Tech's game against East Carolina. Free safety Keion Carpenter was noted in pre-game coverage for his ability to block kicks. He had five during the regular season, tying him with Ike Charlton for the most on the team.

=== Off-field incidents ===
Virginia Tech's coaching staff drew media attention when it was announced that Virginia Tech head football coach Frank Beamer was being actively recruited by Clemson to assume that school's vacant head coaching job. Beamer was first contacted about the job during the regular season, and he was mentioned in connection with Clemson's search throughout the final two weeks of the regular season. He also was mentioned as a possibility for South Carolina's vacant head-coaching job. Three days after Virginia Tech was selected for the Music City Bowl, Beamer ended speculation by publicly turning down Clemson and South Carolina. In exchange for publicly rebuffing the offers, Virginia Tech rewarded Beamer with financial additions to his contract and a contract extension through 2005.

Virginia Tech defensive coordinator Bud Foster also was targeted by other teams prior to the Music City Bowl. Rumors circulated about the University of Florida's interest in hiring Foster to fill its defensive coordinator position, but Foster declined to comment until after Florida's Jan. 2 Orange Bowl game. Foster proceeded through the interview process and was offered the job, but he turned it down in favor of remaining at Tech, which offered him contract incentives.

Alabama likewise underwent rumors of coaching changes. Shortly after the Music City Bowl matchup was announced, rumors spread that quarterbacks coach Charlie Stubbs or tight ends coach Ronnie Cottrell were being considered for other jobs. One departure rumor became reality when defensive line coach Jackie Shipp resigned to take the same position at the University of Oklahoma. Shipp's departure left the Crimson Tide without a defensive line coach, and Alabama head coach Mike DuBose filled the vacancy for the Music City Bowl.

In the days prior to the game, both teams had to cope with harsh winter weather in the Nashville area. Virginia Tech was forced to move practices indoors when an ice storm arrived on the day before Christmas. The storm caused travel delays for fans and players alike. Alabama's first practices in Nashville were held without the full team available because many players had been delayed. The harsh weather continued through the day of the game, and Tech was forced to cancel its final outdoor practice before the game. Alabama, meanwhile, drove 45 minutes to Murfreesboro to a practice field that was not covered by ice.

== Game summary ==
The 1998 Music City bowl kicked off at 5 p.m. EST on December 29, 1998, at Vanderbilt Stadium in Nashville, Tennessee. At kickoff, the weather was chilly, with 43-degree (6 C) temperatures, 10–15 mph (16–24 km/h) wind, 70 percent humidity, and a sleet/rain mix. As the game progressed, wind-chill temperatures dropped as low as 14 °F (−10 °C). Later accounts described the weather as "horrid". American General CEO Joe Kelley performed the ceremonial pre-game coin toss to determine first possession. Jazz musician Larry Carlton performed the traditional pre-game playing of the national anthem, but his rendition of the Star-Spangled Banner did not meet with the crowd's approval, and he was booed. Approximately 41,600 people attended the game in person, and the competition was broadcast on television via ESPN. Approximately 1.8 million U.S. households tuned into the broadcast, which featured Rod Gilmore, Rich Waltz, and Holly Rowe.

=== First quarter ===
Virginia Tech received the ball to begin the game, and Shyrone Stith returned the opening kickoff from the end zone to the Tech 44-yard line. On the first play of the game, Tech quarterback Al Clark completed a pass to Angelo Harrison, but Alabama committed a five-yard offsides penalty, setting up the Hokies at their 49-yard line. After the penalty, running back Lamont Pegues ran straight ahead for a gain of four yards then picked up a first down with a short gain on the next play. Clark completed a pass to Harrison at the 43-yard line, then Clark broke free of the Alabama defense on an improvised run, scrambling 43 yards for a touchdown and the game's first points. Kicker Shayne Graham kicked the extra point, and Virginia Tech took a 7–0 lead over Alabama with 12:25 remaining in the first quarter.

Virginia Tech's post-touchdown kickoff was returned to the Alabama 27-yard line. On Alabama's first play of the game, Crimson Tide quarterback Andrew Zow was sacked by Virginia Tech defender Corey Moore for a loss of seven yards. Running back Shaun Alexander regained five of those lost yards on the next play, then Zow was again sacked by the Tech defense. Alabama thus went three and out to begin the game and prepared for the game's first punt. During the kick, Virginia Tech defender Keion Carpenter broke through the offensive line of Alabama and blocked the punt. Thanks to the blocked punt, the Virginia Tech offense started at the Alabama 14-yard line. On the first play of the drive, Stith ran the ball straight ahead for a gain of one yard. Clark then attempted a pass into the end zone, but the ball was intercepted by Alabama defender Fernando Bryant.

Thanks to the interception in the end zone, Alabama's offense returned to the field at its 20-yard line, the regulation starting point after a ball is downed in the end zone. A deep pass by Zow fell incomplete, then Alexander ran for a one-yard gain. On third down, Zow completed a first-down pass to wide receiver Michael Vaughn at the Alabama 32-yard line. Zow then completed another first-down pass, this time to Freddy Milons at Alabama 45-yard line. Alexander rushed ahead for a one-yard gain, then Zow threw an interception to Tech defender Ryan Smith, who returned the ball to the Alabama 36-yard line. After the interception, Virginia Tech committed a 15-yard personal foul penalty, which pushed the Hokies back to their 49-yard line.

On the first play after the interception, Pegues gained one yard on a rushing play to the right. Clark then completed a pass to Jarrett Ferguson at the Alabama 36-yard line for a first down. During the play, Alabama was called for a five-yard penalty for grabbing Ferguson's facemask during the tackle. After the penalty, Angelo Harrison gained nine yards on a reverse run. Ferguson then was tackled for a loss of two yards, and Clark threw an incomplete pass on third down. Tech head coach Frank Beamer sent in Graham to attempt a 42-yard field goal. The kick sailed right of the goal, however. With 4:10 remaining in the first quarter, Tech led Alabama 7–0.

Thanks to the missed field goal, Alabama began its drive at its 25-yard line—the line of scrimmage for the field goal. In the drive's first play, Zow completed a seven-yard pass to wide receiver Calvin Hall. Alexander then ran to the left side for a two-yard gain. On third down, Alexander gained three yards and a first down. After that, Moore sacked Zow for a two-yard loss, to the 35-yard line. After the sack, Zow was hit again by the Virginia Tech defense and fumbled the ball. The fumble was scooped up by an Alabama player, however, and resulted in a gain of four yards. Zow then completed a pass to Alexander at the 50-yard line for a first down. Once there, Alabama was twice penalized five yards for false starts on consecutive plays. The penalties ran out the final seconds of the first quarter, which ended with Virginia Tech leading, 7–0.

=== Second quarter ===
The second quarter began with Alabama in possession of the ball and facing first down and 21 yards at their 40-yard line. Zow completed a seven-yard pass to Hall, then Alexander lost three yards on a running play, setting up third down and 17. Alabama gained the needed yardage and more on a 24-yard pass from Zow to Alexander at the Tech 32-yard line. On first down, Alexander was tackled for a four-yard loss. Zow regained the lost yards with a completion to Alexander at the Tech 25-yard line. After a one-yard rush, Alabama faced fourth down and one yard at the Tech 23-yard line. Alexander ran to the Tech 20-yard line and gained the first down. After a four-yard rush, Zow completed a pass to Quincy Jackson for no gain, setting up third down. Zow scrambled for a first down at the Tech nine-yard line. Alexander advanced to the five-yard line on a running play, and Zow completed a touchdown pass to Vaughn for the Tide's first points of the game. The extra point kick was successful, and with 9:13 remaining in the first half, the game was tied, 7–7.

Alabama's post-touchdown kickoff sailed through the end zone for a touchback, and Tech's offense started at its 20-yard line. Stith ran ahead for a five-yard gain on first down, then broke free on second down for a 38-yard run to the Alabama 36-yard line. Once there, Clark threw an incomplete pass and Ferguson ran for a two-yard gain. On third down, Clark scrambled for a six-yard gain. Facing fourth down, Beamer sent in Graham to attempt a 44-yard field goal. The kick was good, and with 6:41 remaining in the first half, Virginia Tech regained the lead, 10–7.

Tech's post-score kickoff was returned to the Alabama 15-yard line, and the Crimson Tide began a new drive. On the drive's first play, Tech committed a five-yard offsides penalty. Following the penalty, Alexander was stopped for a two-yard loss. Zow then completed a 40-yard pass for a first down at the Tech 43-yard line. After that long completion, he threw an 11-yard pass for another first down, this time at the Tech 32-yard line. A rushing play was stopped for no gain, Zow threw an incomplete pass into the end zone, then Zow committed an intentional grounding penalty in an attempt to avoid being sacked. The penalty pushed Alabama out of field goal range, and Alabama punted from the Tech 45-yard line.

The ball rolled out of bounds at the one-yard line, and Tech was penalized half the distance to the goal line due to a holding penalty during the kick. Pegues ran for a two-yard gain, then was stopped for a loss of one yard on second down. On third down, Clark completed a pass to Harrison for a first down at the 11-yard line. After the first down, a Tech running play was stopped for a loss of three yards, then Clark scrambled to the 16-yard line, five yards short of the first down. Stith then gained the first down with a run to the 25-yard line. During this time, Tech concentrated on running out the clock by executing multiple running plays, which do not stop the game clock, unlike passing plays. After the first down, Clark was sacked by Alabama defender Cornelius Griffin for a loss of seven yards. Clark regained the lost yards with a nine-yard pass, then picked up a first down with a shovel pass. On first down, Clark completed a pass to Ricky Hall with a first down at the Alabama 45-yard line. At this point, Tech switched from running down the clock to attempting passes downfield in hopes of scoring before halftime. With 32 seconds remaining in the first half, Clark threw an incomplete pass. Clark then was sacked by the Alabama defense, setting up third down at the Tech 46-yard line. Stith ran for a short gain, then Tech set up for a long pass downfield on fourth down.

The pass fell incomplete, and Tech turned the ball over on downs with four seconds remaining. Rather than attempt to score on the final play of the half, the Tide offense took a knee and ended the half with Virginia Tech leading, 10–7.

=== Third quarter ===
After a halftime performance featuring Lorrie Morgan, singer Steve Winwood and the marching bands of the competing schools, Alabama prepared to receive the ball. Because Virginia Tech received the ball to begin the game, Alabama was on offense to begin the second half.

Virginia Tech's kickoff was returned to the Alabama 21-yard line. The first play of the half was a pass from Zow to Alexander, who gained eight yards. On second down, Alexander picked up the first down with a run to the 34-yard line. Zow completed a pass to Milons at the 38-yard line, then had a pass knocked down at the line of scrimmage by the Virginia Tech defense. Zow's third-down pass was knocked down, and the Tide punted. The kick was returned to the Tech 24-yard line, and the Hokies began their first drive of the second half.

Tech's first play of the half was a four-yard run by Pegues. Clark then scrambled for a 25-yard gain and a first down at the Alabama 47-yard line. On first down, Pegues advanced to the 43-yard line on a running play, then Clark was sacked by Alabama's Travis Carroll. The sack resulted in an eight-yard loss, and Clark's third-down pass was incomplete. Tech punted, and the kick was downed at the Alabama 22-yard line.

On the first Tide play of the drive, Alabama was penalized 15 yards for holding on to the facemask of a Virginia Tech player. A running play by Alexander was stopped after a loss of a yard, then Zow threw an interception directly to Virginia Tech's Phillip Summers, who returned the ball to the two-yard line. After the interception, it took Tech two plays for Pegues to push the football across the goal line for Tech's second touchdown of the game. The extra point was good, and Tech extended its lead to 17–7 with 8:15 remaining in the quarter.

Tech's post-touchdown kickoff was returned to the Alabama 16-yard line, and the Tide attempted to respond to the Tech score. The first play of the drive was an incomplete pass by Zow, who then completed a 14-yard pass to Wes Long at the Alabama 30-yard line for a first down. Running back Chad Beasley lost one yard on a running play, then Zow completed a three-yard pass to Alexander. On third down, Alexander dropped a long pass from Zow, and the Tide prepared to punt. During the kick, Tech's special teams defense broke through Alabama's line and blocked a punt for the second time in the game. The ball was recovered by the Hokies at the Alabama 30-yard line, and Tech's offense started their drive inside Alabama territory.

The first play of the Tech drive was a seven-yard run by Stith. This was followed by an incomplete pass from Clark, but Alabama was called for pass interference during the play. After the penalty, Virginia Tech had a first down at the Alabama four-yard line. On the first play after the penalty, Stith broke through the Alabama defense for Tech's second touchdown of the quarter. The extra point was good, and with 5:09 remaining in the quarter, Tech extended its lead to 24–7.

Virginia Tech's kickoff was returned to the 21-yard line, and Alabama again attempted to answer the Hokie score. After an incomplete pass, Zow completed a 21-yard pass to Jackson for a first down at the 42-yard line. Alexander was stopped for a one-yard loss on a running play, then caught a pass for no gain. On third down, Zow threw an incomplete pass, forcing another punt. The kick rolled out of bounds at the Tech 17-yard line, and the Hokies' offense began another drive.

On the first play of the drive, Clark was sacked by Kenny Smith for a six-yard loss. Pegues ran for one yard, then ran for 12 yards on third down. The Hokies punted after going three and out, but the ball bounced off Alabama kick returner Alvin Richard. The loose ball was recovered by Virginia Tech's Cory Bird, and the Hokies' offense returned to the field with 35 seconds remaining in the quarter. From the Alabama 19-yard line, Clark scrambled for a one-yard gain. The play was the last one of the third quarter, which ended with Virginia Tech leading, 24–7.

=== Fourth quarter ===
The fourth quarter began with Virginia Tech in possession of the ball at the Alabama 18-yard line and facing second down and nine. After a running play was stopped for no gain, Clark completed a pass to Pegues, who ran for a first down at the Alabama nine-yard line. After the first down, Alabama committed an offsides penalty. After the penalty, Tech had a first down inside the Alabama five-yard line. Three plays later, Pegues crossed the goal line for a touchdown. The extra point was good, and Tech took a 31–7 lead with 13:31 remaining in the game.

Alabama received Tech's post-touchdown kickoff, which sailed through the end zone for a touchback. Because of the touchback, Alabama's first drive of the quarter started at its 20-yard line. The first play of that drive resulted in a five-yard penalty against Virginia Tech. Alexander then was tackled for a one-yard loss. On second down, Zow threw an incomplete pass, but on third down he completed a 34-yard throw to Alexander, who earned a first down at the Tech 42-yard line. On the first play in Alabama territory, Tech committed a five-yard offsides penalty. Zow then threw two incomplete passes, and on third down he was sacked by the Tech defense at the Hokie 41-yard line. Because the Tide was trailing Tech by four scores, Alabama head coach Mike DuBose ordered his offense to try to convert the fourth down rather than punt. Zow's pass flew incomplete, and Alabama turned the ball over on downs.

Virginia Tech began its first full drive of the fourth quarter at its 41-yard line with 10:21 remaining in the game. Tech transitioned into a running strategy, maximizing the amount of time used off the game clock between each play. On the drive's first play, Stith was tackled for a one-yard loss. On its second play, Stith regained the lost yard. The third-down play was an incomplete pass by Clark, and the Hokies punted after going three and out. The kick rolled into the end zone for a touchback, and Alabama's offense began at its 20-yard line. Alexander was tackled for a two-yard loss, then Zow threw an interception to Anthony Midget, who returned the ball all the way into the end zone for a Virginia Tech defensive touchdown. The extra point was good, and Tech extended its lead to 38–7 with 7:33 remaining in the game.

Tech's post-touchdown kickoff was returned to the Alabama 16-yard line by Milons. The first play of the drive was a 12-yard run by Alexander, who also gained a first down. On the next play, Alabama committed a five-yard false start penalty. Alexander was stopped for no gain on a running play after the penalty, then he picked up nine yards on a running play to the right. On third down, Alexander gained a first down with a run to the 40-yard line. He then was tackled for a two-yard loss. On the next play, Zow was tackled by Jason Buckland for a seven-yard loss. On third down, Alexander ran ahead to the 44-yard line but still was short of the first down marker. Alabama punted, and the kick was downed at the Tech 20-yard line.

Tech continued to run down the clock by running the ball straight ahead for a four-yard gain. Tech backup quarterback Nick Sorensen then entered the game, and running back Andre Kendrick gained a first down with a run to the 33-yard line. Kendrick then gained a first down at the Alabama 39-yard line. Kendrick continued to advance the ball with short runs, draining the clock to secure the Tech lead. Tech's third backup quarterback, Dave Meyer, also entered the game as the final seconds ticked off the clock and Virginia Tech secured its 38–7 win.

== Statistical summary ==
Statistical comparison
	AL	VT
1st downs	15	15
Total yards	274	288
Passing yards	224	71
Rushing yards	50	207
Penalties	10–94	5–31
Turnovers	4	1
Time of possession	36:17	23:43

In recognition of his performance during the game, Virginia Tech defensive end Corey Moore was named the game's most valuable player. Moore had a sack, a tackle for a loss, a blocked punt and a forced fumble. His performance was representative by a successful defensive effort by the Virginia Tech Hokies, who blocked two punts, had three interceptions, and limited Alabama to only seven points and 50 rushing yards. Tech's 31-point margin of victory was its largest bowl-game winning margin in school history, and Alabama's loss was their biggest in a bowl game since a loss in the 1972 Orange Bowl.

Alabama's sole success on offense came from the hands of quarterback Andrew Zow, who completed 19 of 35 passes for 224 yards and a touchdown but also threw three interceptions and fumbled the ball once. Zow's favorite receiver was running back Shaun Alexander, who caught eight passes for 87 yards. Alexander also was Alabama's leading rusher. He finished the game with 21 carries for 55 yards. Zow rushed the ball eight times, but finished with -8 rushing yards. Alexander's eight receptions tied him for third place in receptions during an Alabama bowl game. The record was nine.

On the opposite side of the ball, Virginia Tech quarterback Al Clark completed seven of his 14 passes for 71 yards and an interception. Clark's greatest success came on the ground, however, as he rushed nine times for 55 yards and a touchdown. Most of Virginia Tech's offense came on the ground, as Clark was surpassed in the rushing game by Shyrone Stith, who carried the ball 10 times for 71 yards and a touchdown. Fellow Tech running back Lamont Pegues scored two touchdowns and carried the ball 15 times for 41 yards.

== Postgame effects ==
Virginia Tech's win lifted it to a final record of 9–3, while Alabama's loss dropped it to 7–5. In the final college football polls of the season, Virginia Tech was ranked 19th in the coaches' poll and 23rd in the AP Poll, while Alabama remained unranked. The 38–7 win remains Virginia Tech's biggest bowl-game win.

Citing a desire to pursue "sporting events with a higher profile," American General decided not to renew its sponsorship of the Music City Bowl. In 1999, it was replaced by Homepoint.com, a now-defunct website. The site of the game also changed. It moved from Vanderbilt Stadium to LP Field, then known as Adelphia Coliseum.

=== 1999 NFL draft ===
As the final game of the 1998–1999 regular season, the 1998 Music City Bowl gave Virginia Tech and Alabama players a chance to show their skills prior to the 1999 NFL draft. Alabama had one player selected in the draft. Cornerback Fernando Bryant was selected by the Jacksonville Jaguars in the first round with the 26th overall selection. Virginia Tech had two players taken in the draft: defensive back Pierson Prioleau (110th overall) and guard Derek G. Smith (165th overall).

== See also ==
- 1998 Alabama Crimson Tide football team
