= 1998 South Carolina Gamecocks football team =

American college football season

1998 South Carolina Gamecocks football
- Conference: Southeastern Conference
- Eastern Division
- Record: 1–10 (0–8 SEC)
- Head coach: Brad Scott (5th season)
- Offensive coordinator: Chuck Reedy (1st season)
- Offensive scheme: Pro set
- Defensive coordinator: Wally Burnham (5th season)
- Base defense: 4–3
- Home stadium: Williams–Brice Stadium

1998 Southeastern Conference football standings
	Conf.			Overall
Team	W		L	W		L
Eastern Division
No. 1 Tennessee x$#	8	–	0	13	–	0
No. 5 Florida %	7	–	1	10	–	2
No. 14 Georgia	6	–	2	9	–	3
Kentucky	4	–	4	7	–	5
Vanderbilt	1	–	7	2	–	9
South Carolina	0	–	8	1	–	10
Western Division
Mississippi State xy	6	–	2	8	–	5
No. 16 Arkansas x	6	–	2	9	–	3
Alabama	4	–	4	7	–	5
Ole Miss	3	–	5	7	–	5
LSU	2	–	6	4	–	7
Auburn	1	–	7	3	–	8
Championship: Tennessee 24, Mississippi State 14
# – BCS National Champion; $ – BCS representative as conference champion; % – BCS at-large representative; x – Division champion/co-champions; y – Championship game participant; Rankings from AP Poll

The 1998 South Carolina Gamecocks football team represented the University of South Carolina as a member of the Eastern Division of the Southeastern Conference (SEC) during the 1998 NCAA Division I-A football season. Led by Brad Scott in his final season as head coach, the Gamecocks compiled an overall record of 1–10 with a mark of 0–8 in conference play, placing last out of six teams in the SEC's Eastern Division. The team played home games at Williams–Brice Stadium in Columbia, South Carolina.

South Carolina's record of 1–10 in 1928 was worst season record in program history to that point. The loss to No. 13 Georgia in the second week of the season began a 21-game losing streak for the Gamecocks, which was not snapped until the 2000 season. Scott was fired following the end of the season, but was quickly hired as an assistant coach by Clemson. Lou Holtz was subsequently hired as South Carolina's new head coach, having been an assistant for the Gamecocks in the 1960s.

== Schedule ==
Date	Time	Opponent	Site	TV	Result	Attendance	Source
September 5	7:00 pm	Ball State*	Williams–Brice Stadium; Columbia, SC		W 38–20	78,830	
September 12	6:00 pm	No. 13 Georgia	Williams–Brice Stadium; Columbia, SC (rivalry)	ESPN2	L 3–17	83,411	
September 19	7:00 pm	Marshall*	Williams–Brice Stadium; Columbia, SC	PPV	L 21–24	78,717	
September 26	12:30 pm	Mississippi State	Williams–Brice Stadium; Columbia, SC	JPS	L 0–38	70,052	
October 3	2:00 pm	at Ole Miss	Vaught–Hemingway Stadium; Oxford, MS		L 28–30	42,884	
October 10	7:00 pm	at Kentucky	Commonwealth Stadium; Lexington, KY		L 28–33	57,739	
October 17	1:00 pm	No. 16 Arkansas^{†}	Williams–Brice Stadium; Columbia, SC	PPV	L 28–41	67,930	
October 24	7:00 pm	at Vanderbilt	Vanderbilt Stadium; Nashville, TN		L 14–17	29,721	
October 31	12:30 pm	No. 3 Tennessee	Williams–Brice Stadium; Columbia, SC (rivalry)	JPS	L 14–49	69,523	
November 14	12:30 pm	at No. 4 Florida	Ben Hill Griffin Stadium; Gainesville, FL	JPS	L 14–33	85,528	
November 21	6:30 pm	at Clemson*	Memorial Stadium; Clemson, SC (rivalry)	ESPN2	L 19–28	84,423	
*Non-conference game; ^{†}Homecoming; Rankings from AP Poll released prior to the game; All times are in Eastern time

== Coaching staff ==
- Brad Scott: head coach
- Wally Burnham: defensive coordinator
- Oliver Pough: running backs
- Chuck Reedy: offensive coordinator
