= 1998 Alabama Crimson Tide football team =

American college football season

1998 Alabama Crimson Tide football

Music City Bowl, L 7–38 vs. Virginia Tech
- Conference: Southeastern Conference
- Western Division
- Record: 7–5 (4–4 SEC)
- Head coach: Mike DuBose (2nd season)
- Offensive coordinator: Neil Callaway (1st season)
- Co-offensive coordinator: Charlie Stubbs (1st season)
- Defensive coordinator: Ellis Johnson (2nd season)
- Captains: Calvin Hall; John David Phillips; Daniel Pope; Kelvin Sigler; Trevis Smith
- Home stadium: Bryant–Denny Stadium; Legion Field

1998 Southeastern Conference football standings
	Conf.			Overall
Team	W		L	W		L
Eastern Division
No. 1 Tennessee x$#	8	–	0	13	–	0
No. 5 Florida %	7	–	1	10	–	2
No. 14 Georgia	6	–	2	9	–	3
Kentucky	4	–	4	7	–	5
Vanderbilt	1	–	7	2	–	9
South Carolina	0	–	8	1	–	10
Western Division
Mississippi State xy	6	–	2	8	–	5
No. 16 Arkansas x	6	–	2	9	–	3
Alabama	4	–	4	7	–	5
Ole Miss	3	–	5	7	–	5
LSU	2	–	6	4	–	7
Auburn	1	–	7	3	–	8
Championship: Tennessee 24, Mississippi State 14
# – BCS National Champion; $ – BCS representative as conference champion; % – BCS at-large representative; x – Division champion/co-champions; y – Championship game participant; Rankings from AP Poll

The 1998 Alabama Crimson Tide football team represented the University of Alabama as a member of the Western Division of the Southeastern Conference (SEC) during the 1998 NCAA Division I-A football season. Led by second-year head coach Mike DuBose, the Crimson Tide compiled an overall record of 7–5 with a mark of 4–4 in conference play, placing third in the SEC's Western Division. Alabama as invited to the Music City Bowl, where the Crimson Tide lost to Virginia Tech. The team played home games at Bryant–Denny Stadium in Tuscaloosa, Alabama, and Legion Field in Birmingham, Alabama.

== Schedule ==
Date	Time	Opponent	Rank	Site	TV	Result	Attendance	Source
September 5	6:00 p.m.	BYU*		Bryant–Denny Stadium; Tuscaloosa, AL	ESPN	W 38–31	83,818	
September 12	11:30 a.m.	Vanderbilt		Legion Field; Birmingham, AL	JPS	W 32–7	83,091	
September 26	5:00 p.m.	at Arkansas	No. 22	Razorback Stadium; Fayetteville, AR	ESPN2	L 6–42	51,763	
October 3	11:30 a.m.	No. 8 Florida		Bryant–Denny Stadium; Tuscaloosa, AL (rivalry)	JPS	L 10–16	83,818	
October 10	2:00 p.m.	Ole Miss^{†}		Bryant–Denny Stadium; Tuscaloosa, AL (rivalry)	PPV	W 20–17 ^{OT}	83,818	
October 17	2:00 p.m.	East Carolina*		Legion Field; Birmingham, AL	PPV	W 23–22	80,079	
October 24	2:30 p.m.	at No. 3 Tennessee		Neyland Stadium; Knoxville, TN (Third Saturday in October)	CBS	L 18–35	107,289	
October 31	2:00 p.m.	Southern Miss*		Bryant–Denny Stadium; Tuscaloosa, AL	PPV	W 30–20	83,818	
November 7	2:30 p.m.	at LSU		Tiger Stadium; Baton Rouge, LA (rivalry)	CBS	W 22–16	80,522	
November 14	11:30 a.m.	at Mississippi State		Scott Field; Starkville, MS (rivalry)	JPS	L 14–26	40,517	
November 21	6:30 p.m.	Auburn		Legion Field; Birmingham, AL (Iron Bowl)	ESPN	W 31–17	83,091	
December 29	4:00 p.m.	vs. Virginia Tech*		Vanderbilt Stadium; Nashville, TN (Music City Bowl)	ESPN	L 7–38	41,600	
*Non-conference game; ^{†}Homecoming; Rankings from AP Poll released prior to the game; All times are in Central time

== Rankings ==
Ranking movements Legend: ██ Increase in ranking ██ Decrease in ranking — = Not ranked RV = Received votes
	Week															
Poll	Pre	1	2	3	4	5	6	7	8	9	10	11	12	13	14	Final
AP	RV	RV	24	22	—	—	—	—	—	—	—	—	—	—	—	—
Coaches	RV	RV	22	22	—	—	—	—	—	—	—	—	—	—	—	—
BCS	Not released								—	—	—	—	—	—	—	Not released

== Game summaries ==
=== BYU ===
	1	2	3	4	Total
Cougars	0	14	10	7	31
Crimson Tide	14	10	0	14	38

The Crimson Tide debuted a new east-side upper deck and 81 new skyboxes at Bryant-Denny Stadium, helping set a new attendance record of 83,818. Along with the stadium renovations, Alabama unveiled a new wide-open offense. The record-breaking crowd watched Shaun Alexander score five touchdowns, leading the Crimson Tide to a 38-31 victory over BYU.

Alabama received the football to start the game, with John David Phillips making his first career start for the Crimson Tide. Phillips led Alabama on an impressive 15-play, 65-yard opening drive, which was capped off by Alexander scampering in from 5 yards out to give Alabama an early 7-0 lead.

After a three-and-out by BYU on its opening possession, Alabama once again found the end zone, this time needing just three plays to travel 46 yards. Alexander got his second rushing touchdown of the night, breaking free for a 37-yard touchdown run to extend the Alabama lead to 14-0.

BYU moved the football on its second possession, driving into Alabama territory before a couple of negative plays derailed the drive and forced the Cougars to punt once again.

In the second quarter Alexander fumbled the football, and BYU's Byron Frisch scooped it up and raced 39 yards for a Cougar touchdown, cutting the Alabama lead to 14-7.

Alabama answered by driving 65 yards in nine plays. The drive was capped off by Alexander's third rushing touchdown of the night, this one coming from 1 yard out, to give Alabama a 21-7 advantage.

On its next possession, BYU's Will Snowden fumbled the football, and Alabama's Kevin Sigler recovered at the BYU 46-yard line. Alabama moved the ball inside the Cougars' 15-yard line, but BYU's defense held the Tide out of the end zone. Ryan Pflugner scored a 34-yard field goal to extend the Alabama lead to 24-7.

After another three-and-out by BYU, the Cougars punted, but Alabama's Arvin Richard fumbled on the return, with BYU's Carlos Nuno recovering the ball.

BYU drove 46 yards in eight plays, and scored on a 10-yard touchdown pass from Kevin Feterik to a wide-open Tevita Ofahengaue, trimming the Alabama lead to 24-14.

Alabama took its next possession into BYU territory once again, thanks in large part to a pass interference penalty and then an unsportsmanlike conduct penalty on BYU head coach LaVell Edwards for arguing the call. The drive stalled and Alabama was forced to punt for the first time all night.

BYU attempted to drive the length of the field during the final minute of the half, but the Cougars were unable score and Alabama took a 24-14 lead into halftime.

BYU received the football to start the second half and mounted an impressive 84-yard drive in nine plays, resulting in a 6-yard touchdown run by Reno Mahe to cut the Alabama lead to 24-21.

On Alabama's first play of the second half, Phillips hit Michael Vaughn on a screen pass, which Vaughn took 31 yards into BYU territory. Phillips injured his hand during the drive, and redshirt freshman Andrew Zow made his Alabama debut at quarterback on fourth down. Alexander picked up the first down to keep the drive alive.

Two plays later, Zow completed his first collegiate pass to Quincy Jackson, who was knocked out of bounds just a yard short of the line to gain, setting up another fourth-down situation. Alabama went for it again, but this time Alexander was stuffed at the line of scrimmage. BYU capitalized and drove deep into Alabama territory. The Crimson Tide defense held the Cougars out of the end zone, but Owen Pochman scored a 23-yard field goal to cap off the 67-yard drive and tie the game at 24-24.

Zow remain at quarterback for Alabama on the next possession, and for the first time all night, the Tide went three-and-out, eventually being forced to punt on the opening play of the fourth quarter.

After BYU went three-and-out on its first possession of the fourth quarter, Alabama started its next drive with Zow still at quarterback. However, four plays into the possession, Phillips returned, but Alabama was forced to punt. On BYU's next possession, Feterik's third-down pass wasbintercepted by Fernando Bryant, giving Alabama the football near midfield with eight minutes remaining in the game.

The Tide needed just three plays to regain the lead, when Alexander broke two tackles and raced 28 yards into the end zone for his fourth touchdown of the night, putting Alabama back in front, 31-24.

On BYU's next possession, a fumbled quarterback-center exchange was recovered by Alabama's Reggie Grimes, giving the Crimson Tide the football at the BYU 30-yard line with a chance to put the game away. Six plays and 30 yards later, Alexander ran 2 yards into the end zone for his fifth rushing touchdown of the night, giving Alabama a 38-24 lead with just over a minute and a half remaining in the game.

BYU then drove 75 yards in six plays. Feterik finished the drive himself, running 13 yards for a touchdown with just 15 seconds remaining to cut the Alabama lead to 38-31. BYU's ensuing onside kick was recovered by Alabama, allowing the Crimson Tide to run out the clock and secure a 38-31 victory. This was the first victory in Tuscaloosa for head coach Mike DuBose.

Statistics	BYU	Alabama
First downs	25	25
Total yards	280	339
Rushing yards	98	143
Passing yards	182	196
Turnovers	3	2
Time of possession	30:19	29:41

Team	Category	Player	Statistics
BYU	Passing	Kevin Feterik	19–30, 182 yards, 1 TD, 1 INT
BYU	Rushing	Will Snowden	4 carries, 27 yards
BYU	Receiving	Margin Hooks	4 receptions, 65 yards
Alabama	Passing	John David Phillips	17–29, 188 yards
Alabama	Rushing	Shaun Alexander	26 carries, 115 yards, 5 TD's
Alabama	Receiving	Quincy Jackson	11 receptions, 104 yards

=== Vanderbilt ===
	1	2	3	4	Total
Commodores	7	0	0	0	7
Crimson Tide	7	7	11	7	32

Alabama scored 32 unanswered points after Vanderbilt took a 7-0 lead in the first quarter, and the Crimson Tide earned its first conference victory of the season with a 32-7 win over the Commodores. The victory was Alabama's 300th SEC win.

Vanderbilt received the football to start the game but was forced to punt on its opening possession. Alabama quickly moved into Vanderbilt territory on its second offensive play when John David Phillips found Michael Vaughn on a screen pass for 27 yards, taking the ball inside the Vanderbilt 30-yard line. However, on the very next play, another screen pass was deflected and intercepted by Doyle Crosby, ending the Alabama drive.

Vanderbilt responded with a six-play, 70-yard drive, with the majority of the yardage coming on a 50-yard touchdown pass from David Wallace to Tavarus Hogans. The touchdown gave the Commodores their first points and first lead of the season at 7-0.

Alabama again drove into Vanderbilt territory, thanks in large part to a 36-yard scamper by Shaun Alexander that moved the ball inside the Vanderbilt 40-yard line. The drive stalled, however, and Ryan Pflugner missed a 52-yard field goal wide left.

After an exchange of punts, Wallace overthrew a pass on third down, and the ball was intercepted by Warren Foust, giving Alabama possession at the Vanderbilt 40-yard line. Two plays later, Alexander busted up the middle untouched for a 36-yard touchdown run to tie the game at 7-7.

After three more punts—two by Vanderbilt and one by Alabama—the Crimson Tide put together an 11-play drive that took the ball inside the Vanderbilt 30-yard line, where Alabama faced a third-and-16. Phillips rolled out of the pocket and found a wide-open Quincy Jackson in the back of the end zone, but his throw sailed to the right and led Jackson out of bounds, resulting in an incomplete pass. Pflugner missed a 45-yard field goal.

On the very next play Vanderbilt gave up the ball when Wallace's pass sailed high and was intercepted by Kevin Sigler, giving Alabama the ball back at the Vanderbilt 31-yard line. On the first play of the ensuing possession, Phillips connected with a wide-open Jackson for a 31-yard touchdown, giving Alabama its first lead of the game at 14-7.

Vanderbilt took the final possession of the half into Alabama territory and eventually attempted a 63-yard field goal by John Markham. The kick was partially blocked and fell short; Alabama took a 14-7 lead into halftime.

After an Alabama punt to begin the second half, Vanderbilt went backward after starting at its own 20-yard line. A holding penalty on first down backed the Commodores up to the 10-yard line, and a sack moved them back to the 4. Facing third down, Wallace rolled out in the end zone to avoid another sack and attempted to throw the ball away. However, he threw the ball into an area where no receiver was in sight, resulting in an intentional grounding penalty in the end zone and a safety. The safety extended Alabama's lead to 16-7.

Alabama took the ball into Vanderbilt territory on its ensuing possession and narrowly avoided disaster when Vanderbilt batted a Phillips pass into the air and intercepted it. However, the Commodores were flagged for defensive holding, negating the interception. On the very next play, Alexander took the toss and scampered 8 yards for a touchdown, extending the Alabama lead to 23-7.

After both teams exchanged punts, the Commodores began their next possession inside their own 10-yard line. Three plays later, Kindal Moorehead sacked Wallace in the end zone, resulting in Alabama's second safety of the third quarter and increasing the Crimson Tide's lead to 25-7.

Both teams exchanged punts twice as the game moved into the fourth quarter. Alabama then put together its best drive of the day, going 81 yards in eight plays. The drive was capped off by a perfectly timed draw play against an all-out Vanderbilt blitz, with Alexander breaking through and racing 35 yards for the touchdown to give Alabama a commanding 32-7 lead.

After three more punts—two by Alabama and one by Vanderbilt—the Commodores got the ball back with less than 20 seconds remaining. Backup quarterback Greg Zolman threw a deep pass into the end zone, but the ball was intercepted by Marcus Spencer, ending the game.

Statistics	Vanderbilt	Alabama
First downs	13	16
Total yards	145	400
Rushing yards	–33	221
Passing yards	178	179
Turnovers	3	1
Time of possession	25:31	36:08

Team	Category	Player	Statistics
Vanderbilt	Passing	David Wallace	18–40, 167 yards, 1 TD, 2 INT's
Vanderbilt	Rushing	Jared McGrath	7 carries, 16 yards
Vanderbilt	Receiving	Tavarus Hogans	5 receptions, 74 yards, 1 TD
Alabama	Passing	John David Phillips	19–30, 179 yards, 1 TD, 1 INT
Alabama	Rushing	Shaun Alexander	20 carries, 206 yards, 3 TD's
Alabama	Receiving	Michael Vaughn	8 receptions, 73 yards

=== Arkansas ===
	1	2	3	4	Total
No. 22 Crimson Tide	3	3	0	0	6
Razorbacks	0	14	7	21	42

Despite only trailing by eight at the half, Alabama was shut out in the second half and lost by 36 points, their largest margin of defeat since the 1957 Iron Bowl.

Statistics	Alabama	Arkansas
First downs	7	26
Total yards	152	445
Rushing yards	104	206
Passing yards	48	239
Turnovers	1	3
Time of possession	31:09	28:51

Team	Category	Player	Statistics
Alabama	Passing	John David Phillips	9–21, 48 yards, 1 INT
Alabama	Rushing	Shaun Alexander	21 carries, 48 yards
Alabama	Receiving	Michael Vaughn & Quincy Jackson	2 receptions, 13 yards
Arkansas	Passing	Clint Stoerner	13–29, 239 yards, 3 TD's
Arkansas	Rushing	Madre Hill	20 carries, 120 yards, 1 TD
Arkansas	Receiving	Michael Snowden	3 receptions, 69 yards, 2 TD's

=== Florida ===
	1	2	3	4	Total
No. 8 Gators	6	7	3	0	16
Crimson Tide	3	0	7	0	10

Despite being outgained by over 200 yards, Alabama had an opportunity driving at the end of the game to try to win, but a late interception by Andrew Zow gave Florida the win. Florida had 6 possessions inside the Alabama 12 yard line 3 resulting in turnovers, 3 resulting in field goals that kept Alabama in the game.

Statistics	Florida	Alabama
First downs	23	11
Total yards	467	240
Rushing yards	111	41
Passing yards	356	199
Turnovers	3	2
Time of possession	33:38	26:22

Team	Category	Player	Statistics
Florida	Passing	Doug Johnson	10–20, 187 yards, 1 INT
Florida	Rushing	Terry Jackson	25 carries, 135 yards
Florida	Receiving	Travis McGriff	9 receptions, 213 yards, 1 TD
Alabama	Passing	Andrew Zow	12–26, 185 yards, 1 INT
Alabama	Rushing	Shaun Alexander	16 carries, 57 yards
Alabama	Receiving	Calvin Hall	5 receptions, 84 yards

=== Ole Miss ===
	1	2	3	4	OT	Total
Rebels	0	7	7	3	0	17
Crimson Tide	3	7	0	7	3	20

A 22-yard game-winning field goal by Ryan Pflugner in overtime gave the Crimson Tide its first overtime victory in its second try. The Rebels, who tied it late in the 4th quarter with a field goal to force overtime, threw an interception on their first possession which put Alabama in a score and win scenario.

Statistics	Ole Miss	Alabama
First downs	26	18
Total yards	471	434
Rushing yards	221	162
Passing yards	250	272
Turnovers	1	2
Time of possession	34:42	25:18

Team	Category	Player	Statistics
Ole Miss	Passing	Romaro Miller	22–36, 230 yards 1 TD, 1 INT
Ole Miss	Rushing	Deuce McAllister	24 carries, 188 yards
Ole Miss	Receiving	Cory Peterson	6 receptions, 60 yards
Alabama	Passing	Andrew Zow	15–30, 272 yards, 1 TD, 1 INT
Alabama	Rushing	Shaun Alexander	22 carries, 125 yards
Alabama	Receiving	Shaun Alexander	3 receptions, 72 yards, 1 TD

=== East Carolina ===
	1	2	3	4	Total
Pirates	0	0	19	3	22
Crimson Tide	14	7	2	0	23

Despite having a 21–0 lead at the half, a blocked extra point ran back for two points in the third quarter was the difference in the second half for Alabama. East Carolina outscored Alabama 22–2 in the second half but, never could take the lead away from Alabama.

Statistics	East Carolina	Alabama
First downs	14	20
Total yards	258	331
Rushing yards	84	96
Passing yards	174	235
Turnovers	1	3
Time of possession	25:43	34:17

Team	Category	Player	Statistics
East Carolina	Passing	David Garrard	14–25, 139 yards, 1 TD, 1 INT
East Carolina	Rushing	David Garrard	16 carries, 34 yards
East Carolina	Receiving	Marcellus Harris	3 receptions, 67 yards, 1 TD
Alabama	Passing	Andrew Zow	21–39, 235 yards, 2 TD's, 2 INT's
Alabama	Rushing	Shaun Alexander	22 carries, 86 yards, 1 TD
Alabama	Receiving	Quincy Jackson	5 receptions, 66 yards

=== Tennessee ===
	1	2	3	4	Total
Crimson Tide	3	0	8	7	18
No. 3 Volunteers	7	7	7	14	35

Tennessee, for the 4th year in a row, beat Alabama in what was a close game up until Peerless Price ran a 100-yard kickoff return for a touchdown after the Crimson Tide had cut the lead to three. Alabama never got closer than the ten point lead after that.

Statistics	Alabama	Tennessee
First downs	21	22
Total yards	319	348
Rushing yards	142	231
Passing yards	177	117
Turnovers	1	0
Time of possession	30:16	29:44

Team	Category	Player	Statistics
Alabama	Passing	Andrew Zow	18–39, 177 yards 1 INT
Alabama	Rushing	Shaun Alexander	26 carries, 132 yards, 1 TD
Alabama	Receiving	Quincy Jackson	4 receptions, 35 yards
Tennessee	Passing	Tee Martin	10–14, 117 yards
Tennessee	Rushing	Travis Henry	22 carries, 113 yards, 2 TD's
Tennessee	Receiving	Cedrick Wilson	6 receptions, 76 yards

=== Southern Miss ===
	1	2	3	4	Total
Golden Eagles	7	3	7	3	20
Crimson Tide	3	17	7	3	30

Behind a career-high 361 yards passing from Andrew Zow, the Crimson Tide amassed 499 yards of offense as they beat Southern Miss in their final game at Bryant-Denny Stadium this season.

Statistics	Southern Miss	Alabama
First downs	16	28
Total yards	388	499
Rushing yards	64	138
Passing yards	324	361
Turnovers	1	0
Time of possession	23:17	36:43

Team	Category	Player	Statistics
Southern Miss	Passing	Lee Roberts	17–34, 281 yards 1 TD, 1 INT
Southern Miss	Rushing	Derrick Nix	18 carries, 41 yards, 1 TD
Southern Miss	Receiving	Sherrod Gideon	7 receptions, 192 yards, 1 TD
Alabama	Passing	Andrew Zow	26–35, 361 yards, 3 TD's
Alabama	Rushing	Shaun Alexander	36 carries, 141 yards
Alabama	Receiving	Michael Vaughn	4 receptions, 96 yards, 3 TD's

=== LSU ===
	1	2	3	4	Total
Crimson Tide	0	0	7	15	22
Tigers	0	6	10	0	16

The Crimson Tide trailed 16–7 with less than 3 minutes to go in the game when they were able to score a touchdown with 2:24 left, making the score 16–14. Alabama recovered an onside kick and drove down the field, and with 38 seconds to go in the game Andrew Zow hit Michael Vaughn on a deflected pass in the end zone. After a two point conversion Alabama led 22–16. An interception by Marcus Spencer sealed one of the greatest comebacks in Alabama History. This game was also the first time both teams came into the game not ranked since 1990.

Statistics	Alabama	LSU
First downs	17	27
Total yards	369	486
Rushing yards	85	272
Passing yards	284	214
Turnovers	0	2
Time of possession	27:31	32:29

Team	Category	Player	Statistics
Alabama	Passing	Andrew Zow	17–27, 284 yards, 3 TD's
Alabama	Rushing	Shaun Alexander	22 carries, 109 yards
Alabama	Receiving	Quincy Jackson	4 receptions, 138 yards, 2 TD's
LSU	Passing	Herb Tyler	21–31, 214 yards, 1 TD, 2 INT's
LSU	Rushing	Kevin Faulk	30 carries, 201 yards, 1 TD
LSU	Receiving	Larry Foster	7 receptions, 81 yards

=== Mississippi State ===
	1	2	3	4	Total
Crimson Tide	0	0	14	0	14
Bulldogs	0	17	3	6	26

J.J. Johnson broke a Mississippi State school record for rushing yards in a game at 237 as Mississippi State won its third straight game over Alabama. Despite a 20–0 deficit in the third quarter, Alabama rallied to cut the lead to six but that was as close as they could get.

Statistics	Alabama	Mississippi State
First downs	19	22
Total yards	295	456
Rushing yards	39	264
Passing yards	256	192
Turnovers	2	1
Time of possession	26:57	33:03

Team	Category	Player	Statistics
Alabama	Passing	Andrew Zow	16–32, 256 yards, 1 TD, 1 INT
Alabama	Rushing	Shaun Alexander	20 carries, 60 yards, 1 TD
Alabama	Receiving	Shaun Alexander	5 receptions, 110 yards, 1 TD
Mississippi State	Passing	Wayne Madkin	10–17, 192 yards
Mississippi State	Rushing	J.J. Johnson	36 carries, 237 yards, 2 TD's
Mississippi State	Receiving	J.J. Johnson	3 receptions, 75 yards

=== Auburn ===
	1	2	3	4	Total
Tigers	10	7	0	0	17
Crimson Tide	0	14	7	10	31

Despite trailing 17–0 in the second quarter, Alabama scored the final 31 points of the game to win the Iron Bowl. Four turnovers for Auburn helped the Crimson Tide get back and eventually pull away from Auburn. This was the last Iron Bowl at Birmingham's Legion Field.

Statistics	Auburn	Alabama
First downs	18	17
Total yards	308	329
Rushing yards	100	101
Passing yards	228	208
Turnovers	4	2
Time of possession	27:27	32:33

Team	Category	Player	Statistics
Auburn	Passing	Gabe Gross	14–34, 208 yards, 1 TD, 2 INT's
Auburn	Rushing	Demontray Carter	22 carries, 102 yards
Auburn	Receiving	Clifton Robinson	4 receptions, 92 yards
Alabama	Passing	Andrew Zow	16–23, 191 yards, 1 TD, 1 INT
Alabama	Rushing	Shaun Alexander	27 carries, 109 yards, 2 TD's
Alabama	Receiving	Quincy Jackson	3 receptions, 75 yards, 1 TD

=== Virginia Tech ===
	1	2	3	4	Total
Hokies	7	3	14	14	38
Crimson Tide	0	7	0	0	7

The first ever Music City Bowl had an exciting first half with Alabama trailing Virginia Tech 10–7 at the half. The second half was all Virginia Tech as they outscored the Crimson Tide 28–0 to beat Alabama, which finished the season at 7–5.

Statistics	Virginia Tech	Alabama
First downs	14	15
Total yards	278	274
Rushing yards	207	50
Passing yards	71	224
Turnovers	1	4
Time of possession	25:51	34:09

Team	Category	Player	Statistics
Virginia Tech	Passing	Al Clark	7–14, 71 yards, 1 INT
Virginia Tech	Rushing	Al Clark	9 carries, 82 yards, 1 TD
Virginia Tech	Receiving	Ricky Hall	1 reception, 20 yards
Alabama	Passing	Andrew Zow	19–35, 224 yards, 1 TD, 3 INT's
Alabama	Rushing	Shaun Alexander	21 carries, 68 yards
Alabama	Receiving	Shaun Alexander	8 receptions, 87 yards

== Coaching staff ==
Name	Position	Consecutive seasons at Alabama
Mike DuBose	Head coach	2nd
Neil Callaway	Offensive coordinator/Offensive line coach	2nd
Ronnie Cottrell	Assistant head coach/Tight end	1st
Charlie Stubbs	Quarterback coach	1st
Dabo Swinney	Wide receivers coach	6th
Ivy Williams	Running backs coach	4th
Ellis Johnson	Defensive coordinator/Outside linebackers coach	2nd
Charlie Harbison	Cornerbacks coach	1st
Jeff Rouzie	Special teams coordinator/Inside linebackers coach	8th
Jackie Shipp	Defensive line coach	1st
