= 1998 Kentucky Wildcats football team =

American college football season

1998 Kentucky Wildcats football
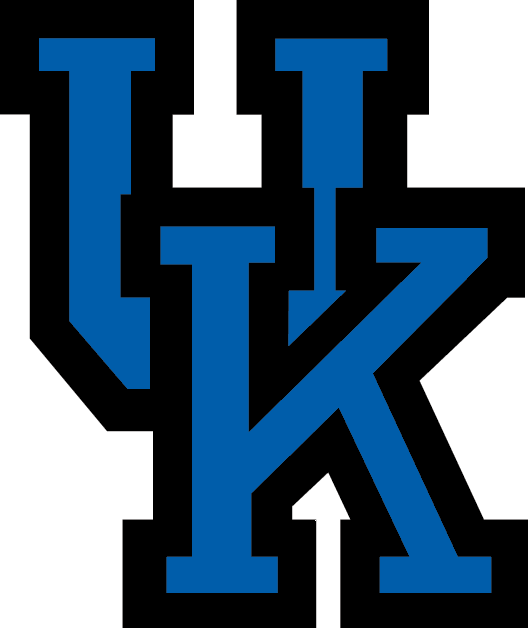

Outback Bowl, L 14–26 vs. Penn State
- Conference: Southeastern Conference
- Eastern Division
- Record: 7–5 (4–4 SEC)
- Head coach: Hal Mumme (2nd season)
- Offensive coordinator: Mike Leach (2nd season)
- Offensive scheme: Air raid
- Defensive coordinator: Mike Major (2nd season)
- Base defense: 4–3
- Home stadium: Commonwealth Stadium

1998 Southeastern Conference football standings
	Conf.			Overall
Team	W		L	W		L
Eastern Division
No. 1 Tennessee x$#	8	–	0	13	–	0
No. 5 Florida %	7	–	1	10	–	2
No. 14 Georgia	6	–	2	9	–	3
Kentucky	4	–	4	7	–	5
Vanderbilt	1	–	7	2	–	9
South Carolina	0	–	8	1	–	10
Western Division
Mississippi State xy	6	–	2	8	–	5
No. 16 Arkansas x	6	–	2	9	–	3
Alabama	4	–	4	7	–	5
Ole Miss	3	–	5	7	–	5
LSU	2	–	6	4	–	7
Auburn	1	–	7	3	–	8
Championship: Tennessee 24, Mississippi State 14
# – BCS National Champion; $ – BCS representative as conference champion; % – BCS at-large representative; x – Division champion/co-champions; y – Championship game participant; Rankings from AP Poll

The 1998 Kentucky Wildcats football team represented the University of Kentucky as a member of the Eastern Division of the Southeastern Conference (SEC) during the 1998 NCAA Division I-A football season. Led by second-year head coach Hal Mumme, the Wildcats compiled an overall record of 7–5 with a mark of 4–4 in conference place, placing fourth in the SEC's Eastern Division. Kentucky was invited to the Outback Bowl, where the Wildcats lost to Penn State. The team played home games at Commonwealth Stadium in Lexington, Kentucky.

Quarterback Tim Couch was the first overall pick in the 1999 NFL draft. Couch led Kentucky to a win on the road at No. 21 LSU. In the Outback Bowl, he completed 30 of 48 passes for 336 yards and two touchdowns in a losing effort. The Wildcats beat Louisville to claim the Governor's Cup.

== Schedule ==
Date	Time	Opponent	Site	TV	Result	Attendance	Source
September 5	3:00 pm	at Louisville*	Papa John's Cardinal Stadium; Louisville, KY (Governor's Cup)	FSN	W 68–34	42,643	
September 12	1:30 pm	Eastern Kentucky*	Commonwealth Stadium; Lexington, KY		W 52–7	57,776	
September 19	1:30 pm	Indiana*	Commonwealth Stadium; Lexington, KY (rivalry)		W 31–27	57,788	
September 26	3:30 pm	at No. 8 Florida	Ben Hill Griffin Stadium; Gainesville, FL (rivalry)	CBS	L 35–51	85,011	
October 3	6:00 pm	at No. 22 Arkansas	War Memorial Stadium; Little Rock, AR	ESPN2	L 20–27	55,782	
October 10	7:00 pm	South Carolina^{†}	Commonwealth Stadium; Lexington, KY		W 33–28	57,739	
October 17	9:00 pm	at No. 21 LSU	Tiger Stadium; Baton Rouge, LA	ESPN2	W 39–36	80,524	
October 24	12:30 pm	No. 11 Georgia	Commonwealth Stadium; Lexington, KY	JPS	L 26–28	57,838	
November 7	6:00 pm	Mississippi State	Commonwealth Stadium; Lexington, KY	ESPN2	W 37–35	57,760	
November 14	1:30 pm	Vanderbilt	Commonwealth Stadium; Lexington, KY (rivalry)		W 55–17	57,521	
November 21	12:30 pm	at No. 1 Tennessee	Neyland Stadium; Knoxville, TN (rivalry)	CBS	L 21–59	107,252	
January 1, 1999	11:00 am	vs. No. 22 Penn State*	Raymond James Stadium; Tampa, FL (Outback Bowl)	ESPN	L 14–26	66,005	
*Non-conference game; ^{†}Homecoming; Rankings from AP Poll released prior to the game; All times are in Eastern time

== Rankings ==
Ranking movements Legend: ██ Increase in ranking ██ Decrease in ranking — = Not ranked RV = Received votes
	Week															
Poll	Pre	1	2	3	4	5	6	7	8	9	10	11	12	13	14	Final
AP	RV	RV	RV	RV	RV	—	RV	RV	RV	RV	RV	RV	—	—	—	—
Coaches	RV	RV	RV	25	RV	RV	RV	RV	RV	RV	RV	25	RV	RV	—	RV
BCS	Not released								—	—	—	—	—	—	—	Not released

== Game summaries ==
=== At Louisville ===
	1	2	3	4	Total
Wildcats	17	24	7	20	68
Cardinals	7	3	6	18	34

Statistics	UK	LOU
First downs	37	26
Total yards	801	501
Rushing yards	230	133
Passing yards	571	368
Passing: comp–att–int	36–47–0	25–44–1
Turnovers	2	1

Team	Category	Player	Statistics
Kentucky	Passing	Tim Couch	29/39, 498 yards, 7 TD
Kentucky	Rushing	Derek Homer	19 rushes, 123 yards, TD
Kentucky	Receiving	Craig Yeast	9 receptions, 150 yards, 2 TD
Louisville	Passing	Chris Redman	25/44, 368 yards, 4 TD, INT
Louisville	Rushing	Rafael Cooper	14 rushes, 72 yards, TD
Louisville	Receiving	Ibn Green	8 receptions, 132 yards, 2 TD

=== Eastern Kentucky ===
	1	2	3	4	Total
Colonels	0	0	7	0	7
Wildcats	14	21	10	7	52

=== Indiana ===
	1	2	3	4	Total
Hoosiers	3	17	7	0	27
Wildcats	0	10	7	14	31

Statistics	IU	UK
First downs	20	22
Total yards	330	469
Rushing yards	168	89
Passing yards	162	380
Passing: comp–att–int	12–34–1	39–54–4
Turnovers	2	6

Team	Category	Player	Statistics
Indiana	Passing	Antwaan Randle El	12/34, 162 yards, INT
Indiana	Rushing	Chris Gall	5 rushes, 100 yards, TD
Indiana	Receiving	Chris Gall	4 receptions, 56 yards
Kentucky	Passing	Tim Couch	38/53, 301 yards, TD, 4 INT
Kentucky	Rushing	Derek Homer	11 rushes, 65 yards, TD
Kentucky	Receiving	Anthony White	9 receptions, 92 yards, TD

=== At No. 8 Florida ===
	1	2	3	4	Total
Wildcats	14	7	7	7	35
No. 8 Gators	14	21	13	3	51

Statistics	UK	FLA
First downs	21	21
Total yards	448	582
Rushing yards	42	130
Passing yards	406	452
Passing: comp–att–int	40–61–2	22–37–1
Turnovers	3	1

Team	Category	Player	Statistics
Kentucky	Passing	Tim Couch	40/61, 406 yards, 3 TD, 2 INT
Kentucky	Rushing	Derek Homer	6 rushes, 20 yards
Kentucky	Receiving	Craig Yeast	6 receptions, 206 yards, 2 TD
Florida	Passing	Doug Johnson	13/23, 270 yards, 5 TD
Florida	Rushing	Terry Jackson	22 rushes, 116 yards
Florida	Receiving	Nafis Karim	6 receptions, 145 yards, 3 TD

=== At No. 22 Arkansas ===
	1	2	3	4	Total
Wildcats	7	7	6	0	20
No. 22 Razorbacks	7	0	6	14	27

Statistics	UK	ARK
First downs	28	23
Total yards	507	355
Rushing yards	8	132
Passing yards	499	223
Passing: comp–att–int	47–67–1	14–28–1
Turnovers	2	1

Team	Category	Player	Statistics
Kentucky	Passing	Tim Couch	47/67, 499 yards, 3 TD, INT
Kentucky	Rushing	Craig Yeast	1 rush, 21 yards
Kentucky	Receiving	Kevin Coleman	6 receptions, 105 yards
Arkansas	Passing	Clint Stoerner	13/27, 199 yards, 2 TD, INT
Arkansas	Rushing	Madre Hill	23 rushes, 106 yards
Arkansas	Receiving	Anthony Lucas	6 receptions, 149 yards, TD

=== South Carolina ===
	1	2	3	4	Total
Gamecocks	7	7	0	14	28
Wildcats	7	10	7	9	33

Statistics	SCAR	UK
First downs	20	25
Total yards	453	526
Rushing yards	85	211
Passing yards	368	315
Passing: comp–att–int	19–46–0	29–42–0
Turnovers	1	1

Team	Category	Player	Statistics
South Carolina	Passing	Anthony Wright	11/29, 219 yards, TD
South Carolina	Rushing	Troy Hambrick	6 rushes, 83 yards, TD
South Carolina	Receiving	Boo Williams	7 receptions, 167 yards, TD
Kentucky	Passing	Tim Couch	29/42, 315 yards, 3 TD
Kentucky	Rushing	Anthony White	18 rushes, 108 yards
Kentucky	Receiving	Anthony White	8 receptions, 117 yards

=== At No. 21 LSU ===
	1	2	3	4	Total
Wildcats	7	9	20	3	39
No. 21 Tigers	0	13	9	14	36

Statistics	UK	LSU
First downs	27	18
Total yards	573	342
Rushing yards	182	74
Passing yards	391	268
Passing: comp–att–int	37–50–1	15–26–0
Turnovers	2	0

Team	Category	Player	Statistics
Kentucky	Passing	Tim Couch	37/50, 391 yards, 3 TD, INT
Kentucky	Rushing	Derek Homer	11 rushes, 60 yards
Kentucky	Receiving	Craig Yeast	7 receptions, 122 yards, 2 TD
LSU	Passing	Herb Tyler	15/26, 268 yards, 2 TD
LSU	Rushing	Kevin Faulk	20 rushes, 67 yards
LSU	Receiving	Larry Foster	5 receptions, 137 yards, 2 TD

=== No. 11 Georgia ===
	1	2	3	4	Total
No. 11 Bulldogs	0	14	14	0	28
Wildcats	10	7	9	0	26

Statistics	UGA	UK
First downs	18	29
Total yards	332	530
Rushing yards	185	204
Passing yards	147	326
Passing: comp–att–int	10–14–1	34–47–3
Turnovers	2	3

Team	Category	Player	Statistics
Georgia	Passing	Quincy Carter	10/14, 147 yards, 2 TD, INT
Georgia	Rushing	Quincy Carter	14 rushes, 114 yards, TD
Georgia	Receiving	Tony Small	3 receptions, 50 yards, TD
Kentucky	Passing	Tim Couch	34/46, 326 yards, 2 TD, 2 INT
Kentucky	Rushing	Derek Homer	16 rushes, 91 yards, TD
Kentucky	Receiving	Kevin Coleman	6 receptions, 100 yards

=== Mississippi State ===
	1	2	3	4	Total
Bulldogs	6	16	7	6	35
Wildcats	3	15	12	7	37

Statistics	MSST	UK
First downs	16	31
Total yards	417	519
Rushing yards	254	181
Passing yards	163	338
Passing: comp–att–int	8–17–0	35–45–1
Turnovers	1	2

Team	Category	Player	Statistics
Mississippi State	Passing	Wayne Madkin	8/16, 163 yards, 2 TD
Mississippi State	Rushing	James Johnson	28 rushes, 209 yards, 2 TD
Mississippi State	Receiving	Kevin Prentiss	4 receptions, 88 yards, TD
Kentucky	Passing	Tim Couch	35/45, 338 yards, 2 TD, INT
Kentucky	Rushing	Derek Homer	10 rushes, 130 yards, 2 TD
Kentucky	Receiving	Kevin Coleman	8 receptions, 103 yards, TD

=== Vanderbilt ===
	1	2	3	4	Total
Commodores	3	0	14	0	17
Wildcats	3	14	31	7	55

Statistics	VAN	UK
First downs	11	31
Total yards	285	585
Rushing yards	100	94
Passing yards	185	585
Passing: comp–att–int	14–37–0	47–58–3
Turnovers	3	5

Team	Category	Player	Statistics
Vanderbilt	Passing	Greg Zolman	7/22, 165 yards, TD
Vanderbilt	Rushing	Jared McGrath	12 rushes, 53 yards
Vanderbilt	Receiving	Tavarus Hogans	3 receptions, 95 yards, TD
Kentucky	Passing	Tim Couch	44/53, 492 yards, 5 TD, 3 INT
Kentucky	Rushing	Derek Homer	10 rushes, 62 yards
Kentucky	Receiving	Craig Yeast	16 receptions, 269 yards, 2 TD

=== At No. 1 Tennessee ===
	1	2	3	4	Total
Wildcats	7	0	7	7	21
No. 1 Volunteers	14	24	14	7	59

Statistics	UK	TENN
First downs	21	21
Total yards	376	466
Rushing yards	39	237
Passing yards	337	229
Passing: comp–att–int	35–58–1	15–25–1
Turnovers	1	1

Team	Category	Player	Statistics
Kentucky	Passing	Tim Couch	35/56, 337 yards, 2 TD, INT
Kentucky	Rushing	Derek Homer	13 rushes, 50 yards, TD
Kentucky	Receiving	Craig Yeast	7 receptions, 102 yards
Tennessee	Passing	Tee Martin	13/20, 189 yards, TD
Tennessee	Rushing	Travis Henry	15 rushes, 67 yards, TD
Tennessee	Receiving	Cedrick Wilson Sr.	4 receptions, 100 yards, TD

=== Vs. No. 22 Penn State (Outback Bowl) ===
	1	2	3	4	Total
No. 22 Nittany Lions	3	10	6	7	26
Wildcats	14	0	0	0	14

Statistics	PSU	UK
First downs	24	24
Total yards	420	441
Rushing yards	233	105
Passing yards	187	336
Passing: comp–att–int	14–27–0	30–48–2
Turnovers	1	3

Team	Category	Player	Statistics
Penn State	Passing	Kevin Thompson	14/27, 187 yards, TD
Penn State	Rushing	Eric McCoo	21 rushes, 105 yards
Penn State	Receiving	Tony Stewart	7 receptions, 71 yards
Kentucky	Passing	Tim Couch	30/48, 336 yards, 2 TD, 2 INT
Kentucky	Rushing	Anthony White	8 rushes, 61 yards
Kentucky	Receiving	Derek Homer	7 receptions, 64 yards

== Roster ==
1998 Kentucky Wildcats football team roster
Players
Coaches
Offense

Pos.	#	Name	Class
QB	2	Tim Couch	Jr
WR	3	Craig Yeast	Sr
QB	16	Matt Mumme	Sr
WR	25	Quentin McCord	So
RB	32	Anthony White	Jr
C	61	Paul McGonagle	Sr
TE	85	James Whalen	Jr
RB		Artose Pinner	Fr

Defense

Pos.	#	Name	Class
CB	20	Eric Kelly	So
LB	30	Marlon McCree	So
DT		Chris Demaree	Fr
DE		Dennis Johnson	Fr

Special teams

Pos.	#	Name	Class
K	10	Seth Hanson	So
P	18	Jimmy Carter	Sr

Head coach

- Hal Mumme

Coordinators/assistant coaches

- Mike Leach – Offensive coordinator/wide receivers
- Chris Hatcher – Quarterbacks
- Tony Franklin – Running backs
- Mike Fanoga – Tight ends/assistant offensive line
- Guy Morriss – Offensive line/assistant head coach
- Mike Major – Defensive coordinator/linebackers
- Bob Brush – Defensive assistant
- Tom Adams – Defensive line
- Darrell Patterson – Safeties
- Tim Keane – Cornerbacks

Legend

- (C) Team captain
- (S) Suspended
- (I) Ineligible
- Injured
- Redshirt

== 1999 NFL draft ==
Player	Position	Round	Pick	NFL club
Tim Couch	Quarterback	1	1	Cleveland Browns
