= 1998 LSU Tigers football team =

American college football season

1998 LSU Tigers football
- Conference: Southeastern Conference
- Western Division
- Record: 4–7 (2–6 SEC)
- Head coach: Gerry DiNardo (4th season)
- Offensive coordinator: Morris Watts (4th season)
- Offensive scheme: Multiple pro sets
- Defensive coordinator: Lou Tepper (1st season)
- Base defense: 3–4
- Home stadium: Tiger Stadium

1998 Southeastern Conference football standings
	Conf.			Overall
Team	W		L	W		L
Eastern Division
No. 1 Tennessee x$#	8	–	0	13	–	0
No. 5 Florida %	7	–	1	10	–	2
No. 14 Georgia	6	–	2	9	–	3
Kentucky	4	–	4	7	–	5
Vanderbilt	1	–	7	2	–	9
South Carolina	0	–	8	1	–	10
Western Division
Mississippi State xy	6	–	2	8	–	5
No. 16 Arkansas x	6	–	2	9	–	3
Alabama	4	–	4	7	–	5
Ole Miss	3	–	5	7	–	5
LSU	2	–	6	4	–	7
Auburn	1	–	7	3	–	8
Championship: Tennessee 24, Mississippi State 14
# – BCS National Champion; $ – BCS representative as conference champion; % – BCS at-large representative; x – Division champion/co-champions; y – Championship game participant; Rankings from AP Poll

The 1998 LSU Tigers football team was an American football team that represented Louisiana State University (LSU) as a member of the Western Division of the Southeastern Conference during the 1998 NCAA Division I-A football season. In their fourth year under head coach Gerry DiNardo, the team compiled a 4–7 record, with a conference record of 2–6, and finished fifth in the SEC's Western Division. The team played home games at Tiger Stadium in Baton Rouge, Louisiana.

In the beginning of the season, expectations were high as LSU had tied for the SEC West title but lost tiebreakers the previous two seasons. After a 3–0 start and No. 6 national ranking, the Tigers' season stunningly fell apart. They finished 1–7 in the last eight games of the season with many close losses, and finished 4–7, their seventh losing season out of the last ten. The loss at Ole Miss was LSU's first overtime game.

== Schedule ==
Date	Time	Opponent	Rank	Site	TV	Result	Attendance	Source
September 12	7:00 p.m.	Arkansas State*	No. 7	Tiger Stadium; Baton Rouge, LA		W 42–6	80,051	
September 19	4:00 p.m.	at Auburn	No. 7	Jordan-Hare Stadium; Auburn, AL (rivalry)	ESPN	W 31–19	85,214	
September 26	7:00 p.m.	Idaho*	No. 6	Tiger Stadium; Baton Rouge, LA		W 53–20	80,466	
October 3	6:00 p.m.	No. 12 Georgia	No. 6	Tiger Stadium; Baton Rouge, LA	ESPN	L 27–28	80,792	
October 10	6:00 p.m.	at No. 6 Florida	No. 11	Ben Hill Griffin Stadium; Gainesville, FL (rivalry)	ESPN	L 10–22	85,407	
October 17	8:00 p.m.	Kentucky	No. 21	Tiger Stadium; Baton Rouge, LA	ESPN2	L 36–39	80,524	
October 24	5:00 p.m.	No. 24 Mississippi State		Tiger Stadium; Baton Rouge, LA (rivalry)	ESPN2	W 41–6	80,040	
October 31	1:00 p.m.	at Ole Miss		Vaught–Hemingway Stadium; Oxford, MS (Magnolia Bowl)	PPV	L 31–37 ^{OT}	50,577	
November 7	2:30 p.m.	Alabama		Tiger Stadium; Baton Rouge, LA (rivalry)	CBS	L 16–22	80,522	
November 21	1:30 p.m.	at No. 10 Notre Dame*		Notre Dame Stadium; Notre Dame, IN	NBC	L 36–39	80,012	
November 27	1:30 p.m.	at No. 13 Arkansas		War Memorial Stadium; Little Rock, AR (rivalry)	CBS	L 14–41	55,831	
*Non-conference game; Rankings from AP Poll released prior to the game; All times are in Central time

== Rankings ==
Ranking movements Legend: ██ Increase in ranking ██ Decrease in ranking — = Not ranked
	Week															
Poll	Pre	1	2	3	4	5	6	7	8	9	10	11	12	13	14	Final
AP	9	7	7	6	6	11	21	—	—	—	—	—	—	—	—	—
Coaches	8	8	7	6	6	12	21	—	—	—	—	—	—	—	—	—
BCS	Not released								—	—	—	—	—	—	—	Not released
