= 1998 SEC Championship Game =

- Conference Championship
- 1998 SEC Championship logo
Mississippi State Bulldogs	Tennessee Volunteers
(8–3)	(11–0)
14	24
Head coach: Jackie Sherrill	Head coach: Phillip Fulmer
AP / Coaches / BCS; 23 / 22 / NR	AP / Coaches / BCS; 1 / 2 / 1
	1	2	3	4	Total
Mississippi State	7	0	0	7	14
Tennessee	0	10	0	14	24
- Date: December 5, 1998
- Season: 1998
- Stadium: Georgia Dome
- Location: Atlanta, Georgia
- MVP: WR Peerless Price, Tennessee
- Favorite: Tennessee by 14
- Referee: Steve Shaw
- Attendance: 74,795

United States TV coverage
- Network: ABC
- Announcers: Keith Jackson (play-by-play); Bob Griese (analyst); Lynn Swann (sideline)

1998 Southeastern Conference football standings
	Conf.			Overall
Team	W		L	W		L
Eastern Division
No. 1 Tennessee x$#	8	–	0	13	–	0
No. 5 Florida %	7	–	1	10	–	2
No. 14 Georgia	6	–	2	9	–	3
Kentucky	4	–	4	7	–	5
Vanderbilt	1	–	7	2	–	9
South Carolina	0	–	8	1	–	10
Western Division
Mississippi State xy	6	–	2	8	–	5
No. 16 Arkansas x	6	–	2	9	–	3
Alabama	4	–	4	7	–	5
Ole Miss	3	–	5	7	–	5
LSU	2	–	6	4	–	7
Auburn	1	–	7	3	–	8
Championship: Tennessee 24, Mississippi State 14
# – BCS National Champion; $ – BCS representative as conference champion; % – BCS at-large representative; x – Division champion/co-champions; y – Championship game participant; Rankings from AP Poll

The 1998 SEC Championship Game was won by the Tennessee Volunteers 24–14 over the Mississippi State Bulldogs. The game was played in the Georgia Dome in Atlanta on December 5, 1998, and was televised to a national audience on ABC.

Mississippi State took a 14–10 lead in the fourth quarter with an 83-yard punt return. The game was clinched when Tee Martin threw two touchdown passes, one to Peerless Price and the other to Cedrick Wilson, in the span of 32 seconds in the fourth quarter.
