= 1998 Vanderbilt Commodores football team =

American college football season

1998 Vanderbilt Commodores football
- Conference: Southeastern conference
- Eastern Division
- Record: 2–9 (1–7 SEC)
- Head coach: Woody Widenhofer (2nd season)
- Offensive coordinator: Steve Crosby (1st season)
- Offensive scheme: Pro-style
- Defensive coordinator: Norm Parker (2nd season)
- Base defense: 4–3
- Captains: Rahim Batten; Clay Condrey; Jared McGrath; Fred Vinson
- Home stadium: Vanderbilt Stadium

1998 Southeastern Conference football standings
	Conf.			Overall
Team	W		L	W		L
Eastern Division
No. 1 Tennessee x$#	8	–	0	13	–	0
No. 5 Florida %	7	–	1	10	–	2
No. 14 Georgia	6	–	2	9	–	3
Kentucky	4	–	4	7	–	5
Vanderbilt	1	–	7	2	–	9
South Carolina	0	–	8	1	–	10
Western Division
Mississippi State xy	6	–	2	8	–	5
No. 16 Arkansas x	6	–	2	9	–	3
Alabama	4	–	4	7	–	5
Ole Miss	3	–	5	7	–	5
LSU	2	–	6	4	–	7
Auburn	1	–	7	3	–	8
Championship: Tennessee 24, Mississippi State 14
# – BCS National Champion; $ – BCS representative as conference champion; % – BCS at-large representative; x – Division champion/co-champions; y – Championship game participant; Rankings from AP Poll

The 1998 Vanderbilt Commodores football team represented Vanderbilt University as a member of the Eastern Division of the Southeastern Conference (SEC) during the 1998 NCAA Division I-A football season. Led by second-year head coach Woody Widenhofer, the Commodores compiled an overall record of 2–9 with a mark of 1–7 in conference play, placing fifth in the SEC's Eastern Division. The team played its home games at Vanderbilt Stadium in Nashville, Tennessee.

== Schedule ==
Date	Time	Opponent	Site	TV	Result	Attendance	Source
September 5	5:00 p.m.	at Mississippi State	Scott Field; Starkville, MS	ESPN2	L 0–42	32,150	
September 12	11:30 a.m.	at Alabama	Legion Field; Birmingham, AL	JPS	L 7–32	83,091	
September 19	11:30 a.m.	Ole Miss	Vanderbilt Stadium; Nashville, TN (rivalry)	JPS	L 6–30	31,482	
October 3	6:00 p.m.	at TCU*	Amon G. Carter Stadium; Fort Worth, TX		L 16–19 ^{2OT}	26,210	
October 10	1:00 p.m.	Western Michigan*	Vanderbilt Stadium; Nashville, TN		L 24–27	26,432	
October 17	11:30 a.m.	at No. 13 Georgia	Sanford Stadium; Athens, GA (rivalry)	JPS	L 6–31	83,911	
October 24	6:00 p.m.	South Carolina	Vanderbilt Stadium; Nashville, TN		W 17–14	29,721	
October 31	1:00 p.m.	Duke*	Vanderbilt Stadium; Nashville, TN		W 36–33	27,214	
November 7	1:00 p.m.	No. 5 Florida	Vanderbilt Stadium; Nashville, TN		L 13–45	33,576	
November 14	12:30 p.m.	at Kentucky	Commonwealth Stadium; Lexington, KY (rivalry)		L 17–55	57,521	
November 28	2:30 p.m.	No. 1 Tennessee	Vanderbilt Stadium; Nashville, TN (rivalry)	ESPN2	L 0–41	41,600	
*Non-conference game; Rankings from AP Poll released prior to the game; All times are in Central time
