= 1998 Georgia Bulldogs football team =

American college football season

1998 Georgia Bulldogs football

Peach Bowl champion

Peach Bowl, W 35–33 vs. Virginia
- Conference: Southeastern Conference
- Eastern Division

Ranking
- Coaches: No. 14
- AP: No. 14
- Record: 9–3 (6–2 SEC)
- Head coach: Jim Donnan (3rd season)
- Offensive scheme: Multiple
- Defensive coordinator: Joe Kines (4th season)
- Base defense: 4–3
- Home stadium: Sanford Stadium

1998 Southeastern Conference football standings
	Conf.			Overall
Team	W		L	W		L
Eastern Division
No. 1 Tennessee x$#	8	–	0	13	–	0
No. 5 Florida %	7	–	1	10	–	2
No. 14 Georgia	6	–	2	9	–	3
Kentucky	4	–	4	7	–	5
Vanderbilt	1	–	7	2	–	9
South Carolina	0	–	8	1	–	10
Western Division
Mississippi State xy	6	–	2	8	–	5
No. 16 Arkansas x	6	–	2	9	–	3
Alabama	4	–	4	7	–	5
Ole Miss	3	–	5	7	–	5
LSU	2	–	6	4	–	7
Auburn	1	–	7	3	–	8
Championship: Tennessee 24, Mississippi State 14
# – BCS National Champion; $ – BCS representative as conference champion; % – BCS at-large representative; x – Division champion/co-champions; y – Championship game participant; Rankings from AP Poll

The 1998 Georgia Bulldogs football team represented the University of Georgia as a member of the Eastern Division of the Southeastern Conference during the 1998 NCAA Division I-A football season. In their third year under head coach Jim Donnan, the Bulldogs compiled an overall record of 9–3 record with a mark of 6–2 in conference play, placing third in the SEC's Eastern Division. Georgia was invited to the Peach Bowl, where the Bulldogs defeated Virginia, 35–33. The team played home games at Sanford Stadium in Athens, Georgia.

== Schedule ==
Date	Time	Opponent	Rank	Site	TV	Result	Attendance	Source
September 5	5:00 p.m.	Kent State*	No. 19	Sanford Stadium; Athens, GA	PPV	W 56–3	86,003	
September 12	6:00 p.m.	at South Carolina	No. 15	Williams–Brice Stadium; Columbia, SC (rivalry)	ESPN2	W 17–3	83,411	
September 19	2:00 p.m.	Wyoming*	No. 12	Sanford Stadium; Athens, GA	FSN	W 16–9	86,117	
October 3	7:00 p.m.	at No. 6 LSU	No. 12	Tiger Stadium; Baton Rouge, LA	ESPN	W 28–27	80,792	
October 10	3:30 p.m.	No. 4 Tennessee	No. 7	Sanford Stadium; Athens, GA (rivalry, College GameDay)	CBS	L 3–22	86,117	
October 17	12:30 p.m.	Vanderbilt^{†}	No. 13	Sanford Stadium; Athens, GA (rivalry)	JPS	W 31–6	83,911	
October 24	12:30 p.m.	at Kentucky	No. 11	Commonwealth Stadium; Lexington, KY	JPS	W 28-26	57,838	
October 31	3:30 p.m.	vs. No. 6 Florida	No. 11	Alltel Stadium; Jacksonville, FL (rivalry)	CBS	L 7–38	84,321	
November 14	7:30 p.m.	at Auburn	No. 17	Jordan-Hare Stadium; Auburn, AL (Deep South's Oldest Rivalry)	ESPN	W 28–17	85,214	
November 21	1:00 p.m.	Ole Miss	No. 14	Sanford Stadium; Athens, GA		W 24–17	85,445	
November 28	12:00 p.m.	No. 17 Georgia Tech*	No. 12	Sanford Stadium; Athens, GA (Clean, Old-Fashioned Hate)	CBS	L 19–21	86,117	
December 31	5:00 p.m.	vs. No. 13 Virginia*	No. 19	Georgia Dome; Atlanta, GA (Peach Bowl)	ESPN	W 35–33	72,876	
*Non-conference game; ^{†}Homecoming; Rankings from AP Poll released prior to the game; All times are in Eastern time

== Rankings ==
Ranking movements Legend: ██ Increase in ranking ██ Decrease in ranking — = Not ranked
	Week															
Poll	Pre	1	2	3	4	5	6	7	8	9	10	11	12	13	14	Final
AP	19	15	12	13	12	7	13	11	11	19	17	14	12	19	19	14
Coaches	18	13	12	12	12	7	14	11	11	18	18	15	12	19	19	14
BCS	Not released								13	—	17	15	15	—	—	Not released

== Roster ==
1998 Georgia Bulldogs football team roster
Players
Coaches
Offense

Pos.	#	Name	Class
RB	25	Ronnie Bradley	Sr
RB	47	Johnny Brown	So
TE	87	Larry Brown	Sr
QB	17	Quincy Carter	Fr
RB	22	Olandis Gary	Sr
OT	75	Jonas Jennings	So
G	60	Bronson Sweatt	Fr
WR	81	Chad Talton	So
OT	70	Chris Terry	Sr
QB	19	Mike Usry	So
TE	89	Jermaine Wiggins	Sr
RB	35	Dave Williams	Sr
OT	61	Kelvin Williams	Jr
C	77	Matt Wilson	Fr

Defense

Pos.	#	Name	Class
CB	4	Champ Bailey	Jr
LB	58	Orantes Grant	Jr
CB	13	Jeff Harris	Jr
CB	31	Jamie Henderson	So
MLB	44	Adrian Hollingshed	So
DT	98	Josh Mallard	So
FS	1	Larry Mann	Sr
DT	51	Brandon Miller	Sr
SS	16	Kirby Smart	Sr
NG	94	Emarlos Leroy	Sr
CB	2	Tim Wansley	Fr
MLB	46	Will Witherspoon	Fr

Special teams

Pos.	#	Name	Class
PK	41	Hap Hines	Jr
PK	32	Chad Holleman	So

Head coach

- Jim Donnan

Coordinators/assistant coaches

- Phil Jones (graduate assistant)

Legend

- (C) Team captain
- (S) Suspended
- (I) Ineligible
- Injured
- Redshirt

Roster
