= 1998 Auburn Tigers football team =

American college football season

1998 Auburn Tigers football
- Conference: Southeastern Conference
- Western Division
- Record: 3–8 (1–7 SEC)
- Head coach: Terry Bowden (6th season; first 6 games); Bill Oliver (interim; final 5 games)
- Offensive coordinator: Rodney Allison (2nd season; first 8 games); Jimbo Fisher (interim; final 3 games)
- Offensive scheme: Pro I formation
- Defensive coordinator: Bill Oliver (3rd season)
- Base defense: 3–4
- Home stadium: Jordan-Hare Stadium

1998 Southeastern Conference football standings
	Conf.			Overall
Team	W		L	W		L
Eastern Division
No. 1 Tennessee x$#	8	–	0	13	–	0
No. 5 Florida %	7	–	1	10	–	2
No. 14 Georgia	6	–	2	9	–	3
Kentucky	4	–	4	7	–	5
Vanderbilt	1	–	7	2	–	9
South Carolina	0	–	8	1	–	10
Western Division
Mississippi State xy	6	–	2	8	–	5
No. 16 Arkansas x	6	–	2	9	–	3
Alabama	4	–	4	7	–	5
Ole Miss	3	–	5	7	–	5
LSU	2	–	6	4	–	7
Auburn	1	–	7	3	–	8
Championship: Tennessee 24, Mississippi State 14
# – BCS National Champion; $ – BCS representative as conference champion; % – BCS at-large representative; x – Division champion/co-champions; y – Championship game participant; Rankings from AP Poll

The 1998 Auburn Tigers football team was an American football team that represented Auburn University as a member of the Southeastern Conference during the 1998 NCAA Division I-A football season. In their sixth year under head coach Terry Bowden, the team compiled a 3–8 record, with a conference record of 1–7, and finished sixth in the SEC's Western Division.

The Tigers began the season coached by Terry Bowden, who led the team to a 1–5 start. Criticism of the coaching arose among fans and key supporters, which resulted in Bowden's resignation on October 23, the day before the Tigers played Louisiana Tech. Defensive coordinator Bill Oliver became the interim head coach for the remainder of the season. Auburn played Alabama on November 21 for the last time at Legion Field in Birmingham. Since then, the Iron Bowl has generally been hosted on an alternating basis at the respective on-campus stadium.

== Schedule ==
Date	Time	Opponent	Rank	Site	TV	Result	Attendance	Source
September 3	7:00 pm	No. 16 Virginia*	No. 25	Jordan-Hare Stadium; Auburn, AL	ESPN	L 0–19	78,315	
September 12	2:30 pm	at Ole Miss		Vaught–Hemingway Stadium; Oxford, MS (rivalry)	FSN	W 17–0	48,371	
September 19	4:00 pm	No. 7 LSU		Jordan-Hare Stadium; Auburn, AL (rivalry)	ESPN	L 19–31	85,214	
October 3	2:30 pm	No. 3 Tennessee		Jordan-Hare Stadium; Auburn, AL (rivalry)	CBS	L 9–17	85,214	
October 10	11:30 am	at Mississippi State		Scott Field; Starkville, MS	JPS	L 21–38	40,029	
October 17	2:30 pm	at No. 5 Florida		Ben Hill Griffin Stadium; Gainesville, FL (rivalry)	CBS	L 3–24	85,557	
October 24	1:00 pm	Louisiana Tech*		Jordan-Hare Stadium; Auburn, AL		W 32–17	74,384	
October 31	1:00 pm	No. 14 Arkansas		Jordan-Hare Stadium; Auburn, AL	PPV	L 21–24	78,649	
November 7	1:00 pm	UCF*^{†}		Jordan-Hare Stadium; Auburn, AL	PPV	W 10–6	80,743	
November 14	6:30 pm	No. 17 Georgia		Jordan-Hare Stadium; Auburn, AL (Deep South's Oldest Rivalry)	ESPN	L 17–28	85,214	
November 21	6:30 pm	at Alabama		Legion Field; Birmingham, AL (Iron Bowl)	ESPN	L 17–31	83,091	
*Non-conference game; ^{†}Homecoming; Rankings from AP Poll released prior to the game; All times are in Central time

== Rankings ==
Ranking movements Legend: ██ Increase in ranking ██ Decrease in ranking — = Not ranked RV = Received votes
	Week															
Poll	Pre	1	2	3	4	5	6	7	8	9	10	11	12	13	14	Final
AP	25	RV	—	—	—	—	—	—	—	—	—	—	—	—	—	—
Coaches	22	RV	—	—	—	—	—	—	—	—	—	—	—	—	—	—
BCS	Not released								—	—	—	—	—	—	—	Not released
