= 1999 Cotton Bowl Classic =

1999 Southwestern Bell Cotton Bowl Classic
- 63rd Cotton Bowl Classic
- Southwestern Bell Cotton Bowl Classic logo
Texas Longhorns	Mississippi State Bulldogs
(8–3)	(8–4)
Big 12	SEC
38	11
Head coach: Mack Brown	Head coach: Jackie Sherrill
AP / Coaches; 20 / 19	AP / Coaches; 25 / 23
	1	2	3	4	Total
Texas	7	7	24	0	38
Mississippi State	0	3	0	8	11
- Date: January 1, 1999
- Season: 1998
- Stadium: Cotton Bowl
- Location: Dallas, Texas
- MVP: RB Ricky Williams (Texas); LB Aaron Babino (Texas)
- Referee: Dan Blum (Conference USA)
- Attendance: 72,611

United States TV coverage
- Network: Fox
- Announcers: Joe Buck and Bill Maas

The Cotton Bowl in Dallas, Texas, hosted the Cotton Bowl Classic.

The 1999 Southwestern Bell Cotton Bowl Classic was a post-season college football game played on January 1, 1999. It pitted the Texas Longhorns against the Southeastern Conference (SEC) West champions Mississippi State Bulldogs. This was the first Cotton Bowl Classic broadcast by Fox.

This game was the first time Texas had reached the post-season since the 1996 season. It was the first bowl game for Texas under new head coach Mack Brown. Texas had compiled an 8–3 season record.

Meanwhile, Mississippi State had compiled an 8–3 regular season record under head coach Jackie Sherrill. They won the SEC West division title before falling to Tennessee, 24–14, in the SEC Championship game. The loss knocked them to 8–4 coming into the bowl game.

Behind the rushing of Ricky Williams, who was declared the Heisman Trophy and Doak Walker award winner a few days before, Texas raced to a 14–3 lead by halftime. They scored 24 unanswered points in the third quarter en route to a 38–11 victory.

It was Texas's first bowl game win since the 1994 Sun Bowl, and their first 9-win season as a Big 12 team (Texas had left the Southwest Conference and joined the Big 12 at the start of the 1996 season). It was also Texas's first New Year's Day bowl win since the 1981 season. It was not only the first Cotton Bowl Classic on Fox, but it was also the first college football game ever broadcast on Fox.
