= 1998 Mississippi State Bulldogs football team =

American college football season

1998 Mississippi State Bulldogs football

SEC Western Division co-champion

SEC Championship Game, L 14–24 vs. Tennessee

Cotton Bowl Classic, L 11–38 vs. Texas
- Conference: Southeastern Conference
- Western Division
- Record: 8–5 (6–2 SEC)
- Head coach: Jackie Sherrill (8th season)
- Offensive coordinator: Lynn Amedee (3rd season)
- Offensive scheme: Multiple
- Defensive coordinator: Joe Lee Dunn (3rd season)
- Base defense: 3–3–5
- Home stadium: Scott Field

1998 Southeastern Conference football standings
	Conf.			Overall
Team	W		L	W		L
Eastern Division
No. 1 Tennessee x$#	8	–	0	13	–	0
No. 5 Florida %	7	–	1	10	–	2
No. 14 Georgia	6	–	2	9	–	3
Kentucky	4	–	4	7	–	5
Vanderbilt	1	–	7	2	–	9
South Carolina	0	–	8	1	–	10
Western Division
Mississippi State xy	6	–	2	8	–	5
No. 16 Arkansas x	6	–	2	9	–	3
Alabama	4	–	4	7	–	5
Ole Miss	3	–	5	7	–	5
LSU	2	–	6	4	–	7
Auburn	1	–	7	3	–	8
Championship: Tennessee 24, Mississippi State 14
# – BCS National Champion; $ – BCS representative as conference champion; % – BCS at-large representative; x – Division champion/co-champions; y – Championship game participant; Rankings from AP Poll

The 1998 Mississippi State Bulldogs football team represented Mississippi State University as a member of the Western Division of the Southern Conference (SEC) during the 1998 NCAA Division I-A football season. Led by eighth-year head coach Jackie Sherrill, the Bulldogs compiled an overall record of 8–5 with a mark of 6–2 in conference play, sharing the SEC's Western Division title with Arkansas. By virtue of Mississippi State's head-to-head win over the Razorbacks, the team advanced to the SEC Championship Game, losing to the eventual national champion, Tennessee. This remains the only appearance in the SEC Championship Game for Mississippi State. The Bulldogs were invited to the Cotton Bowl Classic, where they were defeated by Texas. Mississippi State played home games Scott Field in Starkville, Mississippi.

== Schedule ==
Date	Time	Opponent	Rank	Site	TV	Result	Attendance	Source
September 5	5:00 pm	Vanderbilt		Scott Field; Starkville, MS	ESPN2	W 42–0	32,150	
September 12	11:30 am	at Memphis*		Liberty Bowl Memorial Stadium; Memphis, TN	FSN	W 14–6	28,467	
September 19	6:00 pm	at Oklahoma State*	No. 25	Lewis Field; Stillwater, OK		L 23–42	42,250	
September 26	11:30 am	at South Carolina		Williams–Brice Stadium; Columbia, SC	JPS	W 38–0	70,052	
October 10	11:30 am	Auburn		Scott Field; Starkville, MS	JPS	W 38–21	40,029	
October 17	1:30 pm	East Tennessee State*^{†}		Davis Wade Stadium; Starkville, MS		W 53–6	37,573	
October 24	5:00 pm	at LSU	No. 24	Tiger Stadium; Baton Rouge, LA (rivalry)	ESPN2	L 6–41	80,040	
November 7	5:00 pm	at Kentucky		Commonwealth Stadium; Lexington, KY	ESPN2	L 35–37	57,760	
November 14	11:30 am	Alabama		Scott Field; Starkville, MS (rivalry)	JPS	W 26–14	40,517	
November 21	11:30 am	No. 9 Arkansas		Scott Field; Starkville, MS	JPS	W 22–21	36,656	
November 26	7:00 pm	at Ole Miss	No. 25	Vaught–Hemingway Stadium; Oxford, MS (Egg Bowl)	ESPN	W 28–6	50,412	
December 5	6:30 pm	vs. No. 1 Tennessee*	No. 23	Georgia Dome; Atlanta, GA (SEC Championship Game)	ABC	L 14–24	74,795	
January 1	10:00 am	vs. No. 20 Texas*	No. 25	Cotton Bowl; Dallas, TX (Cotton Bowl Classic)	FOX	L 11–38	72,611	
*Non-conference game; ^{†}Homecoming; Rankings from AP Poll released prior to the game; All times are in Central time

== Rankings ==
Ranking movements Legend: ██ Increase in ranking ██ Decrease in ranking — = Not ranked RV = Received votes
	Week															
Poll	Pre	1	2	3	4	5	6	7	8	9	10	11	12	13	14	Final
AP	—	—	25	—	—	RV	RV	24	—	—	—	RV	25	23	25	RV
Coaches Poll	—	—	RV	—	—	RV	RV	24	RV	—	—	RV	24	22	23	RV
BCS	Not released								—	—	—	—	—	—	—	Not released

== Game summaries ==
=== Ole Miss ===
Team	1	2	3	4	Total
• Mississippi St	7	7	7	7	28
Ole Miss	3	3	0	0	6

- Date: November 26
- Location: Vaught–Hemingway Stadium, Oxford, Mississippi
- Game attendance: 50,412
- TV announcers (ESPN): Mike Tirico & Mike Gottfried

Scoring summary
1	9:36	MISS	Carlisle McGee 40 yard field goal	MISS 3-0
1	4:27	MSU	James Johnson 2 yard run (Brian Hazelwood kick)	MSU 7-3
2	7:36	MSU	James Johnson 1 yard run (Brian Hazelwood kick)	MSU 14-3
2	1:51	MISS	Carlisle McGee 22 yard field goal	MSU 14-6
3	1:06	MSU	Dicenzo Miller 28 yard pass from Wayne Madkin (Brian Hazelwood kick)	MSU 21-6
4	2:34	MSU	Tim Nelson 30 yard interception return (Brian Hazelwood kick)	MSU 28-6
