= Madre Hill =

American football player and coach (born 1976)

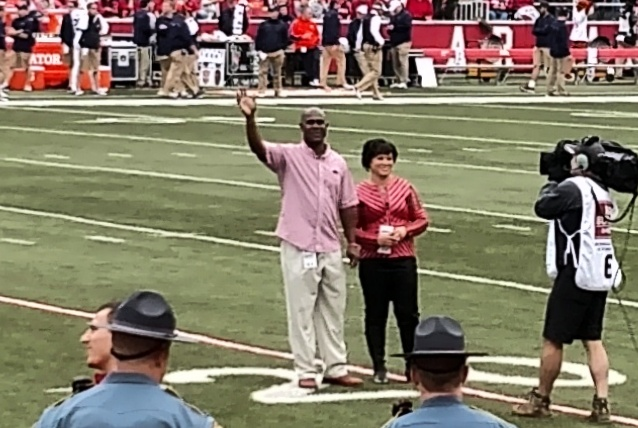
- Hill waves while being honored as an SEC Football Legend on the field at Razorback Stadium

No. 34, 23
- Position: Halfback

Personal information
- Born: January 2, 1976 (age 50); Malvern, Arkansas, U.S.
- Listed height: 5 ft 11 in (1.80 m)
- Listed weight: 199 lb (90 kg)

Career information
- High school: Malvern
- College: Arkansas
- NFL draft: 1999: 7th round, 207th overall pick

Career history

Playing
- Cleveland Browns (1999–2000); Berlin Thunder (2001); San Diego Chargers (2001)*; Oakland Raiders (2002)
- * Offseason or practice squad member only

Coaching
- Arkansas (2004) Graduate assistant; South Carolina (2005) Running backs coach; FIU (2006) Running backs coach

Awards and highlights
- First-team All-SEC (1995); Arkansas record: Rushing touchdowns in a game (6); Arkansas All-Decade Team, 1990s; 2016 SEC Football Legend

Career NFL statistics
- KR: 8
- Return yards: 137
- Return avg.: 17.1
- Long: 27
- Stats at Pro Football Reference

Madre Hill (born January 2, 1976) is an American former professional football player who was a running back in the National Football League (NFL). He played college football for the Arkansas Razorbacks. He was named first-team All-SEC in 1995 and was named to the Razorbacks' all-time team for the 1990s. He formerly held the all-time season rushing record for Arkansas high schools and for the Arkansas Razorbacks.

== Early life ==
Madre Hill grew up in Malvern, Arkansas, where he began playing organized football at an early age. Even before Hill reached high school, leagues were instituting rules in order to keep things fair for his opponents. While playing youth football in the Wilson Intermediate Football League, Hill gained a reputation for scoring practically every time he touched the ball, causing scoring in games to get out of hand. As a result a bylaw was created that limited Hill to three touchdowns if his team was ahead by more than fourteen points. The rule came to be known as the "Madre Hill Rule", but had been out of use for many years until the league re-instated it in 2011 to respond to the abilities of Demias Jimerson, who was dominating games in a similar fashion to Hill.

Hill went on to Malvern High School, where he rushed for a then-state record 6,010 yards and 68 touchdowns. As a senior Hill ran for a state record 2863 yards and led Malvern to a Class AAA State Championship in 1993, running for over 200 yards in the title game. Following his senior year Hill was named Reebok National High School Player of the Year, and was named All-American by USA Today and Blue Chip Illustrated for the second time by each publication. Hill was also a Gatorade Circle of Champions Player of the Year for Arkansas, and closed his high school career with 3 All-State and All-District selections.

== College career ==
Hill played collegiately for the Arkansas Razorbacks from 1994–98, missing the 1996 and 1997 seasons due to tearing the anterior cruciate ligament in each knee.

=== 1994 season ===
As a freshman, Hill ran for 351 yards on 74 carries (4.7 avg.), and tied a school record with a 100-yard kickoff return for a touchdown against the LSU Tigers.

=== 1995 season ===
In 1995, Hill was named 1st team All-Southeastern Conference (SEC) by the SEC coaches and the Associated press, setting single game school records for rushing attempts (45 against Auburn) and rushing touchdowns (6 against South Carolina) and the school's single season record for rushing yards (1387) and rushing attempts (307). His records for season rushing yards and attempts stood until surpassed by Darren McFadden in 2006 and 2007, respectively. Hill led the Razorbacks to the SEC Championship Game that season, where they were defeated by Florida 34–3. Hill left the game after suffering his first knee injury on the opening drive. He tried to return later in the game but was unable to run the ball. It was later determined that Hill had suffered a torn anterior cruciate ligament. The 1995 Hogs finished 8–5 after losing to North Carolina in the Carquest Bowl, without Hill.

=== 1998 season ===
In 1998, Hill came back from a two-year absence and helped the Razorbacks to a 9–3 record and a first place tie for the SEC West Division title with the Mississippi State Bulldogs, in head coach Houston Nutt's first season (Hill's coach from 1994 through 1997 was Danny Ford). Hill rushed for 669 yards (4.2 avg.) and seven touchdown. Arkansas would lose to a Michigan team led by Tom Brady in the Florida Citrus Bowl on January 1, 1999.

Hill was named to the Arkansas Razorbacks All-Decade Team for the 1990s, and finished his Razorback career with 2,407 yards rushing, tenth place all-time at the university. His 25 rushing touchdowns are sixth in school history, and he is also eleventh in 100-yard rushing games, with eight. Local artist Nancy Couch was commissioned by then-athletic director Frank Broyles to paint two Razorback football players running behind a herd of charging razorbacks. For the players Houston Nutt chose Brandon Burlsworth and Madre Hill. The original 8" X 16" oil on canvas painting of Hill running behind Burlsworth currently hangs in the Broyles Athletic Center at the University of Arkansas. Only 1500 numbered originals were printed.

== Professional career ==
Hill was selected by the Cleveland Browns in the seventh round of the 1999 NFL draft. Selected with the first pick of the seventh round, Hill was drafted ahead of players such as Chris Akins and future Pro Bowler Donald Driver. Hill played two seasons with the Browns, playing five games as a kick returner in 1999, returning 8 kicks for 137 yards. Hill spent the 2000 season on injured reserve due to a neck injury.

In 2001, Hill played in NFL Europe for the Berlin Thunder, and was the team's leading rusher with 388 yards on 69 carries (5.6 avg.). He also caught 15 passes for 295 yards (19.7 avg.), returned 7 kicks for 98 yards and scored four touchdowns (2 rushing, 2 receiving). The Thunder finished with a 6–4 record and won World Bowl IX that season, with Hill leading the Thunder in rushing with 31 yards on 8 attempts and catching 4 passes for 35 yards.

Hill's performance with the Berlin Thunder earned him a free agent contract with the San Diego Chargers in 2001. He was signed to fill in during LaDainian Tomlinson's holdout, but was released after appearing in three pre-season games once Tomlinson signed with the team. Hill's final professional season was with the Oakland Raiders in 2002, where he was part of the active roster for the Raiders in Super Bowl XXXVII, which they lost to the Tampa Bay Buccaneers.

== Post-playing career ==
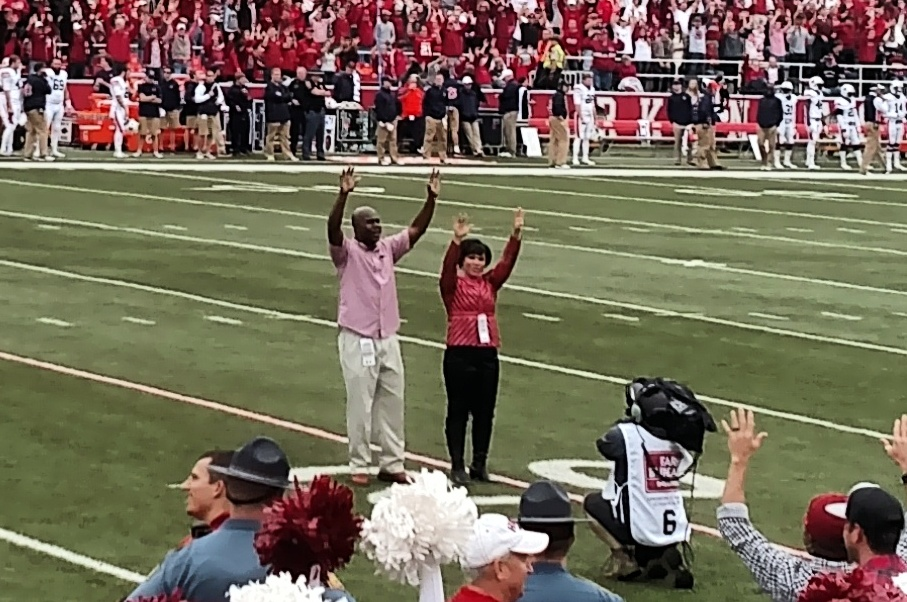
Hill leads a hog call at Razorback Stadium

After playing for the Raiders, Madre Hill returned to the University of Arkansas, where he served as a graduate assistant to head football coach Houston Nutt in 2004. In 2005, Hill was hired by Steve Spurrier at the University of South Carolina as running backs coach. The Gamecocks finished the 2005 season with a 7–5 record and were invited to the Independence Bowl. Hill coached running backs at Florida International University for head coach Don Strock during the 2006 season. In 2011 Hill founded RazorClean Inc., a management, supply, and contracting company.

In September 2015, Hill was named by the Southeastern Conference as one of fifteen SEC Football Legends, and was honored with rest of the class before 2015 SEC Championship Game on December 5, 2015. Hill was one of nine former University of Arkansas student-athletes who were inducted as members of the 2017 class of the University of Arkansas Sports Hall of Honor that September. Hill was also inducted into the Arkansas Sports Hall of Fame in 2019. He is generally considered the best running back of the 1990s for the Razorbacks, and one of the greatest high school running backs in Arkansas high school football history.

== See also ==
- Arkansas Razorbacks football
- Berlin Thunder
