= 1999 Orange Bowl =

1999 FedEx Orange Bowl
- BCS Bowl Game; 65th Orange Bowl
- The Miami Orange Bowl in Miami, Florida, hosted the Orange Bowl.
Florida Gators	Syracuse Orangemen
(9–2)	(8–3)
31	10
Head coach: Steve Spurrier	Head coach: Paul Pasqualoni
AP / Coaches / BCS; 7 / 7 / 8	AP / Coaches / BCS; 18 / 17 / 15
	1	2	3	4	Total
Florida	14	14	0	3	31
Syracuse	0	3	0	7	10
- Date: January 2, 1999
- Season: 1998
- Stadium: Miami Orange Bowl
- Location: Miami, Florida
- MVP: Florida WR Travis Taylor
- Favorite: Florida by 7 (62.5)
- Referee: Dick Honig (Big Ten)
- Attendance: 67,919

United States TV coverage
- Network: ABC
- Announcers: Brad Nessler and Gary Danielson
- Nielsen ratings: 8.4

The 1999 Orange Bowl was a college football bowl game played on January 2, 1999. It was also one of 1998–99 Bowl Championship Series (BCS) games. This 65th edition of the Orange Bowl (the last one ever played at the Miami Orange Bowl) featured the Syracuse Orangemen, and the Florida Gators. Florida came into the game with a 9–2 record, whereas Syracuse was 8–3. Consequently, the Gators were favorites playing in their home state.

Florida came out of the gates swinging, with quarterback Doug Johnson throwing two touchdown passes to wide receiver Travis Taylor creating a 14-0 Florida lead. Syracuse got on the scoreboard in the second quarter following a field goal to close the gap to 14–3. Florida added two more touchdowns before the half to widen the gap to 28–3.

Florida continued to dominate the game, before giving up a 62 yard touchdown from quarterback Donovan McNabb to wide receiver Maurice Jackson, with only 3 minutes left in the game. Florida then ran out the clock to finish the game. Florida, whose only two losses came against top-two opponents, cranked out over 400 yards of total offense. Travis Taylor was named MVP, after catching 7 passes for 159 yards and two touchdowns. Running back Terry Jackson rushed for 108 yards on 21 carries.

This Orange Bowl was played at the Miami Orange Bowl because Pro Player Stadium (later known as Hard Rock Stadium) was being used for an NFL wild card playoff game; coincidentally, both the NFL game and the Orange Bowl were aired on the same network, ABC.

== Aftermath ==
The 1999 Orange Bowl victory clinched Florida's sixth consecutive 10-win season. They finished the season 10-2, and ranked in the final Top 5.
