= 1998 Arkansas Razorbacks football team =

American college football season

1998 Arkansas Razorbacks football

SEC Western Division co-champion

Florida Citrus Bowl, L 31–45 vs. Michigan
- Conference: Southeastern Conference
- Western Division

Ranking
- Coaches: No. 17
- AP: No. 16
- Record: 9–3 (6–2 SEC)
- Head coach: Houston Nutt (1st season)
- Offensive scheme: Multiple
- Co-defensive coordinators: Bobby Allen (1st season); Keith Burns (1st season)
- Base defense: 4–4
- Captains: Brandon Burlsworth; Grant Garrett; Ryan Hale; Madre Hill
- Home stadium: Razorback Stadium; War Memorial Stadium

1998 Southeastern Conference football standings
	Conf.			Overall
Team	W		L	W		L
Eastern Division
No. 1 Tennessee x$#	8	–	0	13	–	0
No. 5 Florida %	7	–	1	10	–	2
No. 14 Georgia	6	–	2	9	–	3
Kentucky	4	–	4	7	–	5
Vanderbilt	1	–	7	2	–	9
South Carolina	0	–	8	1	–	10
Western Division
Mississippi State xy	6	–	2	8	–	5
No. 16 Arkansas x	6	–	2	9	–	3
Alabama	4	–	4	7	–	5
Ole Miss	3	–	5	7	–	5
LSU	2	–	6	4	–	7
Auburn	1	–	7	3	–	8
Championship: Tennessee 24, Mississippi State 14
# – BCS National Champion; $ – BCS representative as conference champion; % – BCS at-large representative; x – Division champion/co-champions; y – Championship game participant; Rankings from AP Poll

The 1998 Arkansas Razorbacks football team represented the University of Arkansas as a member of the Western Division of the Southeastern Conference during the 1998 NCAA Division I-A football season. Led by first-year head coach Houston Nutt, the Razorbacks compiled an overall record 9–3 with a mark of 6–2 in conference play, sharing the SEC's Western Division title with Mississippi State. By virtue of a head-to-head loss to the Bulldogs, Arkansas was left out of the SEC Championship Game. The Razorbacks were invited to the Florida Citrus Bowl, where they lost to Michigan. The team played home games at Razorback Stadium in Fayetteville, Arkansas and War Memorial Stadium in Little Rock, Arkansas.

Nutt became the first Arkansas head coach to win his first eight games. In the ninth game of the season, undefeated, No. 10 Arkansas lost to the future national champion, No. 1 Tennessee in Knoxville, 28–24, due in large part to a fumble late in the game by Arkansas quarterback Clint Stoerner. Tennessee recovered the fumble and then drove the short field for the go-ahead touchdown with less than a minute to play. It is considered one of the most devastating losses in Razorback football history. The emotional hangover from that loss adversely affected Arkansas the following week, leading to an upset loss at Mississippi State, 22–21. Beating LSU in the regular season finale secured Arkansas a share of the division title and sent the 9–2 Razorbacks to the Florida Citrus Bowl in Orlando on New Year's Day to play the Michigan Wolverines. In the first meeting ever between the two schools, the Tom Brady-led Wolverines won, 45–31, and Arkansas finished the season 9–3 and ranked No. 16 in the final AP poll.

== Schedule ==
Date	Time	Opponent	Rank	Site	TV	Result	Attendance	Source
September 5	6:00 pm	Southwestern Louisiana*		Razorback Stadium; Fayetteville, AR		W 38–17	47,562	
September 19	6:00 pm	SMU*		War Memorial Stadium; Little Rock, AR		W 44–17	55,544	
September 26	5:00 pm	No. 22 Alabama		Razorback Stadium; Fayetteville, AR	ESPN2	W 42–6	51,763	
October 3	5:00 pm	Kentucky	No. 22	War Memorial Stadium; Little Rock, AR	ESPN2	W 27–20	55,782	
October 10	2:30 pm	at Memphis*	No. 20	Liberty Bowl Memorial Stadium; Memphis, TN	FX	W 23–9	42,766	
October 17	12:00 pm	at South Carolina	No. 17	Williams–Brice Stadium; Columbia, SC	PPV	W 41–28	67,930	
October 31	1:00 pm	at Auburn	No. 14	Jordan-Hare Stadium; Auburn, AL	PPV	W 24–21	78,439	
November 7	11:30 am	Ole Miss	No. 11	Razorback Stadium; Fayetteville, AR (rivalry)	JPS	W 34–0	49,115	
November 14	2:30 pm	at No. 1 Tennessee	No. 10	Neyland Stadium; Knoxville, TN	CBS	L 24–28	106,365	
November 21	11:30 am	at Mississippi State	No. 9	Scott Field; Starkville, MS	JPS	L 21–22	36,656	
November 27	1:30 pm	LSU	No. 13	War Memorial Stadium; Little Rock, AR (rivalry)	CBS	W 41–14	55,831	
January 1	1:00 pm	vs. No. 15 Michigan*	No. 11	Florida Citrus Bowl; Orlando, FL (Florida Citrus Bowl)	ABC	L 31–45	63,584	
*Non-conference game; Rankings from AP Poll released prior to the game; All times are in Central time

== Rankings ==
Ranking movements Legend: ██ Increase in ranking ██ Decrease in ranking — = Not ranked RV = Received votes
	Week															
Poll	Pre	1	2	3	4	5	6	7	8	9	10	11	12	13	14	Final
AP	—	—	RV	RV	22	20	17	15	14	11	10	9	13	11	11	16
Coaches	—	RV	RV	RV	24	19	16	12	12	10	9	9	13	11	11	17
BCS	Not released								12	11	7	9	13	13	13	Not released

== Game summaries ==
=== vs No. 22 Alabama ===
	1	2	3	4	Total
No. 22 Crimson Tide	3	3	0	0	6
Razorbacks	0	14	7	21	42

After leading by eight at halftime, Arkansas shut out Alabama in the second half to earn a dominant 36-point win.

Statistics	Alabama	Arkansas
First downs	7	26
Total yards	152	445
Rushing yards	104	206
Passing yards	48	239
Turnovers	1	3
Time of possession	31:09	28:51

Team	Category	Player	Statistics
Alabama	Passing	John David Phillips	9–21, 48 yards, 1 INT
Alabama	Rushing	Shaun Alexander	21 carries, 48 yards
Alabama	Receiving	Michael Vaughn; Quincy Jackson	2 receptions, 13 yards
Arkansas	Passing	Clint Stoerner	13–29, 239 yards, 3 TD's
Arkansas	Rushing	Madre Hill	20 carries, 120 yards, 1 TD
Arkansas	Receiving	Michael Snowden	3 receptions, 69 yards, 2 TD's

=== at No. 1 Tennessee ===
	1	2	3	4	Total
No. 10 Razorbacks	7	14	3	0	24
No. 1 Volunteers	0	10	10	8	28

Arkansas led 21–3 in the first half, but couldn't survive a season-saving comeback by the Volunteers. A late turnover by the Hogs gave Tennessee an opportunity to drive for the game-winning touchdown. Tennessee would go on to win the national championship.

=== Florida Citrus Bowl (vs No. 15 Michigan) ===
Arkansas vs. Michigan

Team	1	2	3	4	Total
No. 11 Arkansas	0	10	14	7	31
• No. 15 Michigan	3	21	0	21	45

- Date: January 1, 1999
- Location: Florida Citrus Bowl, Orlando, FL
- Game start: 12:00 p.m.
- Game attendance: 63,584

Scoring summary
1	10:37	MICH	Jay Feely 43-yard field goal	MICH 3–0
2	10:37	ARK	Michael Williams 35-yard pass from Clint Stoerner (Todd Latourette kick)	ARK 7–3
2	7:40	MICH	Anthony Thomas 2-yard run (Feely kick)	MICH 10–7
2	5:39	MICH	Ian Gold 46-yard interception return (Feely kick)	MICH 17–7
2	2:12	ARK	Latourette 42-yard field goal	MICH 17–10
2	0:34	MICH	Thomas 5-yard run (Feely kick)	MICH 24–10
3	9:10	ARK	Chrys Chukwuma 2-yard run (Latourette kick)	MICH 24–17
3	5:48	ARK	Chukwuma 1-yard run (Latourette kick)	TIE 24–24
4	12:18	ARK	Joe Dean Davenport 9-yard pass from Stoerner (Latourette kick)	ARK 31–24
4	5:49	MICH	Thomas 1-yard run (Feely kick)	TIE 31–31
4	2:25	MICH	DiAllo Johnson 21-yard pass from Brady (Feely kick)	MICH 38–31
4	3:48	MICH	James Whitley 26-yard interception return (Feely kick)	MICH 45–31

On January 1, 1999, No. 15 Michigan defeated No. 11 Arkansas, 45–31, before a crowd of 63,584 in the 1999 Florida Citrus Bowl in Orlando, Florida.

Statistics	Arkansas	Michigan
First downs	20	21
Plays–yards	82–348	76–434
Rushes–yards	40–116	46–204
Passing yards	232	230
Passing: comp–att–int	17-42-2	16–30–2
Time of possession	28:43	31:17

Team	Category	Player	Statistics
Arkansas	Passing	Clint Stoerner	17/42, 232 yards, 2 TD, 2 INT
Arkansas	Rushing	Chrys Chukwuma	17 carries, 56 yards, 2 TD
Arkansas	Receiving	Michael Williams	7 receptions, 90 yards, 1 TD
Michigan	Passing	Tom Brady	14/27, 209 yards, 1 TD, 2 INT
Michigan	Rushing	Anthony Thomas	21 carries, 132 yards, 3 TD
Michigan	Receiving	Tai Streets	7 receptions, 129 yards

== Roster ==
1998 Arkansas Razorbacks football team roster
Players
Coaches
Offense

Pos.	#	Name	Class
QB	14	Clint Stoerner	Jr
RB	22	Chrys Chukwuma	Jr
RB	34	Madre Hill	Sr
FB	47	Nathan Norman
C	54	Grant Garrett
G	60	Russ Brown
OT	69	Bobbie Williams	Jr
OT	72	Chad Abernathy	Sr
G	77	Brandon Burlsworth	Sr
SE	80	Anthony Lucas	Jr
FL	81	Emanuel Smith	Jr
TE	85	Joe Dean Davenport	Jr

Defense

Pos.	#	Name	Class
DE	1	Randy Garner
CB	18	David Barrett	Jr
FS	29	Kenoy Kennedy	Jr
DB	30	Jeremy Flowers
DL	41	Melvin Bradley	Sr
LB	53	Quenton Caver	So
NG	96	Ryan Hale	Sr

Special teams

Pos.	#	Name	Class
K	8	Chris Akin
K	10	Todd Latourette	Sr

Head coach

- Houston Nutt

Coordinators/assistant coaches

- Keith Burns – Defensive coordinator
- Mike Markuson – Offensive line
- Barry Lunney Jr. – Graduate assistant

Legend

- (C) Team captain
- (S) Suspended
- (I) Ineligible
- Injured
- Redshirt

Roster
