= 1998 Ole Miss Rebels football team =

American college football season

1998 Ole Miss Rebels football

Independence Bowl champion

Independence Bowl, W 35–18 vs. Texas Tech
- Conference: Southeastern Conference
- Western Division
- Record: 7–5 (3–5 SEC)
- Head coach: Tommy Tuberville (4th season; regular season); David Cutcliffe (bowl game)
- Offensive coordinator: Noel Mazzone (4th season)
- Offensive scheme: Pro-style
- Defensive coordinator: Art Kaufman (4th season)
- Base defense: 4–3
- Home stadium: Vaught–Hemingway Stadium

1998 Southeastern Conference football standings
	Conf.			Overall
Team	W		L	W		L
Eastern Division
No. 1 Tennessee x$#	8	–	0	13	–	0
No. 5 Florida %	7	–	1	10	–	2
No. 14 Georgia	6	–	2	9	–	3
Kentucky	4	–	4	7	–	5
Vanderbilt	1	–	7	2	–	9
South Carolina	0	–	8	1	–	10
Western Division
Mississippi State xy	6	–	2	8	–	5
No. 16 Arkansas x	6	–	2	9	–	3
Alabama	4	–	4	7	–	5
Ole Miss	3	–	5	7	–	5
LSU	2	–	6	4	–	7
Auburn	1	–	7	3	–	8
Championship: Tennessee 24, Mississippi State 14
# – BCS National Champion; $ – BCS representative as conference champion; % – BCS at-large representative; x – Division champion/co-champions; y – Championship game participant; Rankings from AP Poll

The 1998 Ole Miss Rebels football team was an American football team that represented the University of Mississippi as a member of the Western Division of the Southeastern Conference during the 1998 NCAA Division I-A football season. In their fourth and final year under head coach Tommy Tuberville, the team compiled a 7–5 record, with a conference record of 3–5, and finished fourth in the Western Division.

Tuberville departed for SEC West rival Auburn following the season. David Cutcliffe, who coached the bowl game, led the Rebels from the 1999 season.

== Schedule ==
Date	Time	Opponent	Site	TV	Result	Attendance	Source
September 5	11:30 am	Memphis*	Vaught–Hemingway Stadium; Oxford, MS (rivalry)	JPS	W 30–10	46,191	
September 12	2:30 pm	Auburn	Vaught–Hemingway Stadium; Oxford, MS (rivalry)	FSN	L 0–17	48,371	
September 19	11:30 am	at Vanderbilt	Vanderbilt Stadium; Nashville, TN (rivalry)	JPS	W 30–6	31,482	
September 26	2:00 pm	at SMU*	Cotton Bowl; Dallas, TX		W 48–41 ^{OT}	22,281	
October 3	1:00 pm	South Carolina	Vaught–Hemingway Stadium; Oxford, MS		W 30–28	42,884	
October 10	2:00 pm	at Alabama	Bryant–Denny Stadium; Tuscaloosa, AL (rivalry)	PPV	L 17–20 ^{OT}	83,818	
October 24	1:00 pm	Arkansas State*^{†}	Vaught–Hemingway Stadium; Oxford, MS		W 30–17	38,116	
October 31	1:00 pm	LSU	Vaught–Hemingway Stadium; Oxford, MS (rivalry)		W 37–31 ^{OT}	50,577	
November 7	11:30 am	at No. 11 Arkansas	Razorback Stadium; Fayetteville, AZ (rivalry)	JPS	L 0–34	49,115	
November 21	12:00 pm	at No. 14 Georgia	Sanford Stadium; Athens, GA		L 17–24	85,445	
November 26	7:00 pm	No. 25 Mississippi State	Vaught–Hemingway Stadium; Oxford, MS (Egg Bowl)	ESPN	L 6–28	50,412	
December 31	7:30 pm	vs. Texas Tech*	Independence Stadium; Shreveport, LA (Independence Bowl)	ESPN	W 35–18	46,862	
*Non-conference game; ^{†}Homecoming; Rankings from AP Poll released prior to the game; All times are in Central time

== Roster ==
1998 Ole Miss Rebels football team roster
Players
Coaches
Offense

Pos.	#	Name	Class
WR		Grant Heard
RB		Deuce McAllister	So

Defense

Pos.	#	Name	Class
DB	12	Kenny Woods	Sr

Special teams

Pos.	#	Name	Class

Head coach

- Tommy Tuberville

Coordinators/assistant coaches

Legend

- (C) Team captain
- (S) Suspended
- (I) Ineligible
- Injured
- Redshirt
