= 1998 Florida Gators football team =

American college football season

1998 Florida Gators football

Orange Bowl champion

Orange Bowl, W 31–10 vs. Syracuse
- Conference: Southeastern Conference
- Eastern Division

Ranking
- Coaches: No. 6
- AP: No. 5
- Record: 10–2 (7–1 SEC)
- Head coach: Steve Spurrier (9th season)
- Offensive coordinator: Carl Franks (4th season)
- Offensive scheme: Fun and gun
- Defensive coordinator: Bob Stoops (3rd season)
- Base defense: 4–3
- Home stadium: Ben Hill Griffin Stadium

1998 Southeastern Conference football standings
	Conf.			Overall
Team	W		L	W		L
Eastern Division
No. 1 Tennessee x$#	8	–	0	13	–	0
No. 5 Florida %	7	–	1	10	–	2
No. 14 Georgia	6	–	2	9	–	3
Kentucky	4	–	4	7	–	5
Vanderbilt	1	–	7	2	–	9
South Carolina	0	–	8	1	–	10
Western Division
Mississippi State xy	6	–	2	8	–	5
No. 16 Arkansas x	6	–	2	9	–	3
Alabama	4	–	4	7	–	5
Ole Miss	3	–	5	7	–	5
LSU	2	–	6	4	–	7
Auburn	1	–	7	3	–	8
Championship: Tennessee 24, Mississippi State 14
# – BCS National Champion; $ – BCS representative as conference champion; % – BCS at-large representative; x – Division champion/co-champions; y – Championship game participant; Rankings from AP Poll

The 1998 Florida Gators football team represented the University of Florida as a member of the Eastern Division of the Southeastern Conference (SEC) during the 1998 NCAA Division I-A football season. Led by ninth-year head coach Steve Spurrier, the Gators compiled an overall record of 10–2 with mark of 7–1 in conference play, placing second the six SEC Eastern Division teams. Florida was invited to the Orange Bowl, where the Gators defeated Syracuse. The team played home games at Ben Hill Griffin Stadium in Gainesville, Florida.

== Schedule ==
Date	Opponent	Rank	Site	TV	Result	Attendance	Source
September 5	The Citadel*	No. 3	Ben Hill Griffin Stadium; Gainesville, FL	PPV	W 49–10	85,061	
September 12	Northeast Louisiana*	No. 3	Ben Hill Griffin Stadium; Gainesville, FL	PPV	W 42–10	85,228	
September 19	at No. 6 Tennessee	No. 2	Neyland Stadium; Knoxville, TN (rivalry)	CBS	L 17–20 ^{OT}	107,653	
September 26	Kentucky	No. 8	Ben Hill Griffin Stadium; Gainesville, FL (rivalry)	CBS	W 51–35	85,011	
October 3	at Alabama	No. 8	Bryant–Denny Stadium; Tuscaloosa, AL (rivalry)	JPS	W 16–10	83,818	
October 10	No. 11 LSU	No. 6	Ben Hill Griffin Stadium; Gainesville, FL (rivalry)	ESPN	W 22–10	85,407	
October 17	Auburn	No. 5	Ben Hill Griffin Stadium; Gainesville, FL (rivalry)	CBS	W 24–3	85,557	
October 31	vs. No. 11 Georgia	No. 5	Alltel Stadium; Jacksonville, FL (rivalry)	CBS	W 38–7	84,321	
November 7	at Vanderbilt	No. 5	Vanderbilt Stadium; Nashville, TN	PPV	W 45–13	33,576	
November 14	South Carolina^{†}	No. 4	Ben Hill Griffin Stadium; Gainesville, FL	JPS	W 33–14	85,528	
November 21	at No. 5 Florida State*	No. 4	Doak Campbell Stadium; Tallahassee, FL (rivalry)	ABC	L 12–23	81,614	
January 2, 1999	vs. No. 18 Syracuse*	No. 7	Miami Orange Bowl; Miami, FL (Orange Bowl)	ABC	W 31–10	67,919	
*Non-conference game; ^{†}Homecoming; Rankings from AP Poll released prior to the game

== Rankings ==
Ranking movements Legend: ██ Increase in ranking ██ Decrease in ranking ( ) = First-place votes
	Week															
Poll	Pre	1	2	3	4	5	6	7	8	9	10	11	12	13	14	Final
AP	3 (5)	3 (4)	2 (9)	8	8	6	5	5	6	5	4	4	8	7	7	5
Coaches	4 (1)	4 (2)	2 (1)	9	8	6	5	5	5	5	4	4	8	7	7	6
BCS	Not released								7	5	5	5	8	7	8	Not released

== Game summaries ==
=== Tennessee ===
After Peyton Manning and several other star players moved on to the NFL after the 1997 season, most preseason prognosticators saw Tennessee's 1998 squad as taking a step backward from championship contention. However, they were still ranked No. 6 when the No. 2 Gators rolled into Knoxville looking to beat their rivals for the sixth consecutive year.

It was not to be. Led by junior quarterback Tee Martin and a stout defense, the Vols recovered four Gators fumbles, held their opponent to -30 yards rushing, and slowed UF's two-quarterback passing attack, which featured Doug Johnson and Jesse Palmer alternating plays. The game was close throughout, with the score knotted at 10 at halftime and 17 at the end of regulation. Tennessee was held to a Jeff Hall field goal during their first possession of overtime. When it was UF's turn, placekicker Collins Cooper missed an answering field goal, giving UT a 20–17 win and inspiring the jubilant home fans to rush the turf of Neyland Stadium and tear down the goalposts.

=== Florida State ===
This 1998 battle between the in state rivals started before the whistle even blew. A pre-game fight caused Florida's starting senior safety, Tony George, and a couple walk-on FSU players who were not even dressed, to be ejected from the game. In the midst of the fight, it is rumored that Florida quarterback Doug Johnson attempted to peg FSU coach Bobby Bowden with a football. Johnson did later apologize to Bowden, claiming that he had no target, he just threw the ball. Florida State's defense came in the ballgame rated No. 1 in the nation, Florida's defense was rated No. 1 in the SEC, so the game was set to be a defensive battle. Florida struck first with a 50-yard Doug Johnson touchdown pass, but Seminoles Peter Warrick and Travis Minor put the Seminoles in scoring position twice and Placekicker Sebastian Janikowski kicked two field goals to make the game 7–6. After a Florida punt the Seminoles were at their own 5-yard-line and Florida forced a safety. And then Doug Johnson drove Florida deep into Florida State territory after the safety kick, but Florida State's defense stiffened and forced Florida to settle for three points. At halftime, the game was 12–6, Florida.

In the second half Florida State's defense held Florida scoreless. Florida State's first touchdown of the game came when Seminoles quarterback Marcus Outzen connected with Peter Warrick on a touchdown throw, then later in the game, Peter Warrick threw a touchdown to Ron Dugans. The game ended 23–12, with Florida State the winner.
