= 1998 Penn State Nittany Lions football team =

American college football season

1998 Penn State Nittany Lions football

Lambert-Meadowlands Trophy Outback Bowl champion

Outback Bowl, W 26–14 vs. Kentucky
- Conference: Big Ten Conference

Ranking
- Coaches: No. 15
- AP: No. 17
- Record: 9–3 (5–3 Big Ten)
- Head coach: Joe Paterno (33rd season)
- Offensive coordinator: Fran Ganter (15th season)
- Offensive scheme: Pro-style
- Defensive coordinator: Jerry Sandusky (22nd season)
- Base defense: 4–3
- Captains: Shawn Lee; Joe Nastasi; Brad Scioli; Floyd Wedderburn
- Home stadium: Beaver Stadium

1998 Big Ten Conference football standings
	Conf.			Overall
Team	W		L	W		L
No. 2 Ohio State %+	7	–	1	11	–	1
No. 6 Wisconsin $+	7	–	1	11	–	1
No. 12 Michigan +	7	–	1	10	–	3
No. 24 Purdue	6	–	2	9	–	4
No. 17 Penn State	5	–	3	9	–	3
Michigan State	4	–	4	6	–	6
Minnesota	2	–	6	5	–	6
Indiana	2	–	6	4	–	7
Illinois	2	–	6	3	–	8
Iowa	2	–	6	3	–	8
Northwestern	0	–	8	3	–	9
$ – BCS representative as conference champion; % – BCS at-large representative; + – Conference co-champions; Rankings from AP Poll

The 1998 Penn State Nittany Lions football team represented the Pennsylvania State University as a member of the Big Ten Conference during the 1998 NCAA Division I-A football season. Led by 33rd-year head coach Joe Paterno, the Nittany Lions compiled an overall record of 9–3 with a mark of 5–3 in conference play, placing fifth in the Big Ten. Penn State was invited to the Outback Bowl, where the Nittany Lions defeated Kentucky. The team played home games at Beaver Stadium in University Park, Pennsylvania.

== Schedule ==
Date	Time	Opponent	Rank	Site	TV	Result	Attendance	Source
September 5	3:30 p.m.	No. 21 Southern Miss*	No. 13	Beaver Stadium; University Park, PA	ABC	W 34–6	96,617	
September 12	12:00 p.m.	Bowling Green*	No. 9	Beaver Stadium; University Park, PA	ESPN Plus	W 48–3	96,291	
September 19	3:30 p.m.	at Pittsburgh*	No. 8	Pitt Stadium; Pittsburgh, PA (rivalry)	CBS	W 20–13	56,743	
October 3	12:00 p.m.	at No. 1 Ohio State	No. 7	Ohio Stadium; Columbus, OH (rivalry, College GameDay)	ABC	L 9–28	93,479	
October 10	3:30 p.m.	at Minnesota	No. 13	Hubert H. Humphrey Metrodome; Minneapolis, MN (Governor's Victory Bell)	ABC	W 27–17	40,546	
October 17	3:30 p.m.	Purdue^{†}	No. 12	Beaver Stadium; University Park, PA	ABC	W 31–13	97,034	
October 31	12:00 p.m.	Illinois	No. 10	Beaver Stadium; University Park, PA	ESPN Plus	W 27–0	96,508	
November 7	12:00 p.m.	at No. 22 Michigan	No. 9	Michigan Stadium; Ann Arbor, MI (rivalry)	ABC	L 0–27	111,019	
November 14	12:00 p.m.	Northwestern	No. 19	Beaver Stadium; University Park, PA	ESPN2	W 41–10	96,382	
November 21	3:00 p.m.	at No. 13 Wisconsin	No. 16	Camp Randall Stadium; Madison, WI	ESPN	L 3–24	78,964	
November 28	1:00 p.m.	Michigan State	No. 23	Beaver Stadium; University Park, PA (rivalry)	ABC	W 51–28	96,358	
January 1, 1999	11:00 a.m.	vs. Kentucky*	No. 22	Raymond James Stadium; Tampa, FL (Outback Bowl)	ESPN	W 26–14	66,005	
*Non-conference game; ^{†}Homecoming; Rankings from AP Poll released prior to the game; All times are in Eastern time

== Rankings ==
Ranking movements Legend: ██ Increase in ranking ██ Decrease in ranking — = Not ranked
	Week															
Poll	Pre	1	2	3	4	5	6	7	8	9	10	11	12	13	14	Final
AP	13	9	8	7	7	13	12	10	10	9	19	16	23	22	22	17
Coaches Poll	13	9	8	7	7	13	11	9	10	9	17	14	21	20	20	15
BCS	Not released								10	9	18	17	—	—	—	Not released

== Roster ==
1998 Penn State Nittany Lions football team roster
Players
Coaches
Offense

Pos.	#	Name	Class
OT	78	John Blick	Jr
FB	36	Mike Cerimele	So
WR	13	Sam Crenshaw	So
WR	20	Eddie Drummond	Fr
WR	2	Chafie Fields	Jr
TE	85	John Gilmore	Fr
G	71	Joe Hartings	Fr
WR	21	Joe Nastasi	Sr
RB	8	Eric McCoo	Fr
OT	67	Kareem McKenzie	So
TE	89	Tony Stewart	So
QB	16	Kevin Thompson	Jr
G	69	Floyd Wedderburn	Sr
RB	22	Kenny Watson	So

Defense

Pos.	#	Name	Class
LB	11	LaVar Arrington	So
DT	57	Imani Bell	Jr
CB	6	James Boyd	So
CB	1	Bruce Branch	Fr
DE	86	Courtney Brown	Jr
DT	95	David Fleischhauer	Jr
SS	4	Derek Fox	Jr
DE	96	Bob Jones	Fr
CB	10	Bhawoh Jue	So
DE	94	Marc Kielmeyer	So
CB	19	Anthony King	Jr
DE	37	Justin Kurpeikis	So
CB	27	David Macklin	Jr
DE	5	Brad Scioli	Sr
LB	43	Brandon Short	Jr

Special teams

Pos.	#	Name	Class
P	41	Pat Pidgeon	Jr

Head coach

- Joe Paterno

Coordinators/assistant coaches

Legend

- (C) Team captain
- (S) Suspended
- (I) Ineligible
- Injured
- Redshirt

Roster

== NFL draft ==
Two Nittany Lions were drafted in the 1999 NFL draft.

Round	Pick	Overall	Name	Position	Team
5th	5	138	Brad Scioli	Defensive end	Indianapolis Colts
5th	7	140	Floyd Wedderburn	Offensive guard	Seattle Seahawks
