= Ebenezer Ekuban =

American football player (born 1976)

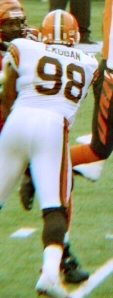
- Ekuban with the Browns in 2004

No. 96, 98, 91
- Position: Defensive end

Personal information
- Born: May 29, 1976 (age 50); Accra, Ghana
- Listed height: 6 ft 4 in (1.93 m)
- Listed weight: 275 lb (125 kg)

Career information
- High school: Bladensburg (Bladensburg, Maryland, U.S)
- College: North Carolina
- NFL draft: 1999: 1st round, 20th overall pick

Career history
- Dallas Cowboys (1999–2003); Cleveland Browns (2004); Denver Broncos (2005–2008)

Awards and highlights
- NFL All-Rookie team (1999); Second-team All-American (1998); First-team All-ACC (1998)

Career NFL statistics
- Games played: 122
- Total tackles: 281
- Sacks: 36.5
- Forced fumbles: 7
- Fumble recoveries: 7
- Pass deflections: 6
- Stats at Pro Football Reference

Ebenezer Ekuban Jr. (born May 29, 1976) is an American former professional football player who was a defensive end in the National Football League (NFL) for the Dallas Cowboys, Cleveland Browns, and Denver Broncos. He played college football for the North Carolina Tar Heels. He is distinguished as being the first Ghanaian to play in the NFL.

== Early life ==
Ekuban started playing American football during his junior year at Bladensburg High School. As a senior, he was a two-way player at tight end and defensive end, recording 28 receptions for 546 yards, 5 touchdowns, 76 tackles and 11 sacks. He was also an honor student.

He accepted a football scholarship from the University of North Carolina. As a freshman, he was a backup tight end and played in the final 8 games, making only one reception for 4-yard touchdown.

As a sophomore, he appeared in 10 games, tallying 5 receptions for 62 yards. Against the University of Houston, he had a season-long reception of 22 yards and a 4-yard touchdown.

As a junior, he was moved to defensive end. He played in 10 games (2 starts), collecting 40 tackles (9 for loss), 5 sacks, 12 quarterback pressures, 2 passes defensed and one forced fumble. Against the University of Maryland, he made 9 tackles (4 for loss) and 3 sacks.

As a senior, he became a full-time starter, registering 96 tackles, 7 sacks (led the team), 3 quarterback pressures, 4 passes defensed, 2 forced fumbles, one blocked kick and a school record 23 tackles for loss. Against Clemson University, he had a career-high 16 tackles (4 for loss), 2 sacks and one forced fumble. He received second-team All-American and All-ACC honors. He also made the Dean's List and received the Jim Tatum award for the ACC's top student athlete, because of his academic achievements.

== Professional career ==
=== Pre-Draft ===
Pre-draft measurables
Height	Weight	Arm length	Hand span	40-yard dash	10-yard split	20-yard split	20-yard shuttle	Three-cone drill	Vertical jump	Broad jump
6 ft 3 3/8 in (1.91 m)	281 lb (127 kg)	33 in (0.84 m)	10 3/8 in (0.26 m)	4.70 s	1.62 s	2.73 s	4.39 s	7.36 s	32.0 in (0.81 m)	9 ft 4 in (2.84 m)
All values from the NFL Combine

=== Dallas Cowboys ===
Although the Dallas Cowboys had invested their first draft choice in selecting a defensive end in three of the previous five drafts, they were still looking to replace the production of Charles Haley and Tony Tolbert. With only two years of total experience at defensive end, the team thought that Ekuban was coming into his own, so they traded to the Seattle Seahawks the 22nd (Lamar King) and 140th (Floyd Wedderburn) selections, in exchange for the 20th pick, in order to select him in the first round of the 1999 NFL draft.

The Cowboys wanted Ekuban to become the pass-rushing bookend to former Tar Heel teammate Greg Ellis. As a rookie, he played in 16 games, posting 33 tackles (3 for loss), 2.5 sacks (tied for sixth on the team) and 10 quarterback pressures. He started the final 2 contests in place of an injured Ellis and was named to the NFL All-Rookie team.

In 2000, he started the first 2 games, before being moved back to a reserve role behind Alonzo Spellman. Although he missed 4 games with a dislocated right toe he suffered in the fourth game against the San Francisco 49ers, he still led the team with 6.5 sacks and 2 forced fumbles. He also had 25 tackles (4 for loss) and 7 quarterback pressures.

In 2001, he was named the starter at right defensive end, but suffered a herniated disc in the season-opener against the Tampa Bay Buccaneers and had surgery on September 17. He returned to practice on a limited basis on November 9, but still suffered pain and was forced to be placed on the injured reserve list on December 21. He finished with one tackle and one quarterback hurry.

In 2002, he registered 15 starts, 43 tackles (2 for loss), one sack, 20 quarterback pressures and one forced fumble. Although he played a key role in the defense, he was still one of just five starting defensive ends in the NFL with one or no sacks.

In 2003, he had 1.5 sacks in the second game against the New York Giants, but would later find himself in new head coach Bill Parcells' dog house. He was eventually deactivated in the thirteenth game against the Philadelphia Eagles, with Eric Ogbogu taking his starting position in that contest and against the Washington Redskins. This led to a brief public confrontation between the two in the media. He recorded 30 tackles (3 for loss), 2.5 sacks, 12 quarterback pressures and 2 forced fumbles.

At the end of the year, the Cowboys did not make an attempt to re-sign him, preferring to instead sign free agent defensive end Marcellus Wiley.

=== Cleveland Browns ===
On March 10, 2004, he signed with the Cleveland Browns as a free agent, reuniting with defensive coordinator Dave Campo, who was his head coach with the Cowboys. Playing alongside Gerard Warren and Courtney Brown, who were also considered first round disappointments, he went on to have a strong season with 54 tackles, 2 passes defensed, 2 fumble recoveries, one forced fumble and a career-high 8 sacks in 16 games (11 starts).

In 2005, new head coach Romeo Crennel looked to change the defensive line personnel, in order to implement a new 3–4 defense. On March 30, Ekuban along with defensive tackle Michael Myers, were traded to the Denver Broncos in exchange for running back Reuben Droughns.

=== Denver Broncos ===
In 2005, with the Broncos also signing free agent Courtney Brown, as well as obtaining Ekuban, Myers and Gerard Warren in separate trades with the Browns, the local media referred to the Broncos new defensive line as the "Browncos", since all four starters were also the Browns starters the year before, under new defensive line coach Andre Patterson. He registered 41 tackles, 4 sacks (tied for the team lead), 2 passes defensed and one forced fumble in 16 games (4 starts).

In 2006, he had 78 tackles, 7 sacks (second on the team), 2 passes defensed and one forced fumble in 15 starts. Ekuban missed the entire 2007 season due to a right Achilles tendon tear, suffered in the second preseason game against his former team, the Dallas Cowboys.

In 2008, he was re-signed to a one-year $3.12 million contract, to compete with Jarvis Moss and John Engelberger for the left defensive end position. Ekuban was the last remaining "Brownco", as Warren was traded to the Oakland Raiders the year before and Brown and Myers were waived in previous years. He finished the season with 49 tackles, 5 sacks (tied for the team lead), one pass defensed and one fumble recovery in 15 games (10 starts).

In 2009, new head coach Josh McDaniels implemented a 3-4 defense and decided not to re-sign him, since he was not considered a good fit for the scheme.

=== NFL statistics ===
Year	Team	GP	Tackles				Fumbles	
Year	Team	GP	Comb	Solo	Ast	Sack	FF	FR
1999	DAL	16	23	19	4	2.5	0	0
2000	DAL	12	28	21	7	6.5	2	1
2001	DAL	1	2	1	1	0.0	0	0
2002	DAL	16	31	26	5	1.0	0	2
2003	DAL	15	26	18	8	2.5	3	0
2004	CLE	16	37	28	9	8.0	1	2
2005	DEN	16	27	19	8	4.0	0	1
2006	DEN	15	63	48	15	7.0	1	0
2007	DEN	0	Did not play due to injury					
2008	DEN	15	38	29	9	5.0	0	1
Career		122	275	209	66	36.5	7	7

== Personal life ==
In the fall of 2010, Ekuban assisted the football staff at Regis Jesuit High School in Aurora, Colorado as an assistant coach. He also was hired by the Denver Broncos to serve in their player development department.

== Trivia ==
Ekuban has been said to have "the perfect name for an evil wizard" by BioWare video game writer Brad Prince.
