= Michael Myers (American football) =

American football player (born 1976)

No. 94, 93, 96
- Positions: Defensive tackle, defensive end

Personal information
- Born: January 20, 1976 (age 50); Vicksburg, Mississippi, U.S.
- Listed height: 6 ft 2 in (1.88 m)
- Listed weight: 300 lb (136 kg)

Career information
- High school: Vicksburg
- College: Hinds CC, Alabama
- NFL draft: 1998: 4th round, 100th overall pick

Career history
- Dallas Cowboys (1998–2003); Cleveland Browns (2003-2004); Denver Broncos (2005–2006); Cincinnati Bengals (2007)

Awards and highlights
- First-team All-American (1996); 2× JUCO All-American (1994, 1995); First-team All-SEC (1996)

Career NFL statistics
- Total tackles: 321
- Sacks: 15.5
- Forced fumbles: 4
- Fumble recoveries: 7
- Interceptions: 1
- Stats at Pro Football Reference

Michael Myers (born January 20, 1976) is an American former professional football player who was a defensive tackle in the National Football League (NFL) for the Dallas Cowboys, Cleveland Browns, Denver Broncos and Cincinnati Bengals. He played college football for the Alabama Crimson Tide.

== Early life ==
Myers attended Vicksburg High School where he played both football and basketball and was an All-state selection in both sports.

He received a scholarship from the University of Mississippi, but after a low score in the ACT, he had to play two seasons at Hinds Community College in Raymond, Mississippi. As a freshman, he posted 46 tackles (14 for loss), 25 quarterback pressures, 3 passes defensed, 3 forced fumbles, 2 fumble recoveries and set a record with 20 sacks. The next year, he collected 63 tackles (16 for loss), 8 sacks, 27 quarterback pressures, 5 passes defensed, 5 forced fumbles and 3 fumble recoveries. He was twice named a junior college All-American.

Myers transferred to the University of Alabama, where as a junior he finished with 66 tackles (8 for loss), 24 quarterback pressures, 3 passes defensed, 2 fumble recoveries and 13 sacks (third on the school's all-time list).

He was mentioned as a preseason All-American and All-SEC selection entering his senior season, but after the season opener against Vanderbilt University, where he made 5 tackles and half a sack, he was abruptly suspended for having contacted a sports agent before his eligibility was over.

== Professional career ==
Pre-draft measurables
Height	Weight	Arm length	Hand span	40-yard dash	10-yard split	20-yard split	20-yard shuttle	Three-cone drill	Vertical jump	Broad jump	Bench press
6 ft 2 3/8 in (1.89 m)	285 lb (129 kg)	34 3/4 in (0.88 m)	9 1/2 in (0.24 m)	5.11 s	1.75 s	2.98 s	5.10 s	8.47 s	25.0 in (0.64 m)	8 ft 3 in (2.51 m)	21 reps
All values from NFL Combine

=== Dallas Cowboys ===
==== 1998 ====
Myers was selected by the Dallas Cowboys in the fourth round (100th overall) of the 1998 NFL draft, after he dropped for being out of football for a year and having a poor Senior Bowl. Although he was played at defensive tackle in training camp, when the season started he was the backup defensive end behind Kavika Pittman.

He appeared in every game and made his first start against the Washington Redskins on December 27, where he recorded a sack and became along with Greg Ellis the first pair of rookie defensive linemen to start in the same game in franchise history. He finished with 23 tackles (9 solo), 3 sacks, 5 quarterback pressures and 2 passes defensed.

==== 1999 ====
Myers only played in six regular season games and was declared inactive in 10 contests, tallying 11 tackles (one for loss) and 2 quarterback pressures. Because of injuries on the defensive line, he took part in the Wild Card playoff game at the Minnesota Vikings, where he had 6 tackles and 2 sacks.

==== 2000 ====
He was declared inactive in the first 3 games. He was given the opportunity to start the last seven games after defensive tackle Leon Lett was lost with a season ending knee injury.

His first start at defensive tackle came against the Cincinnati Bengals on November 12. He also made a number of plays as a tight end in goal-line formations during the season. He played in 13 games (7 starts), registering 46 tackles (30 solo), 4 tackles for loss (fourth on the team), 6 quarterback pressures, 2 passes defensed, one forced fumble and one fumble recovery.

==== 2001 ====
Although he was seen as an undersized player at defensive tackle, he started in every game and was part of a defense that was ranked fourth in the NFL with only 287.4 yards allowed per game. He finished sixth on the team in tackles (72), tied for second in sacks (3.5) and third in quarterback pressures (18).

==== 2002 ====
The signing of free agent defensive tackle La'Roi Glover by the team, relegated him into a reserve role. He appeared in every game, registering 44 tackles (25 solo), 7 tackles for loss (tied for second on the team), one sack, 8 quarterback pressures, one forced fumble, one fumble recovery and 3 passes defensed.

==== 2003 ====
He started the season opener against the Atlanta Falcons and registered 2 tackles. He was inactive for the next 3 games, before being waived on October 7.

=== Cleveland Browns ===
==== 2003 ====
Myers signed with the Cleveland Browns as a free agent on November 12. He had a career day versus the Baltimore Ravens on December 21 with ten tackles and two sacks. He played in 7 games (1 start), recording 26 tackles (9 solo), 3 sacks and one pass defensed.

==== 2004 ====
He played in every game and made seven starts, finishing with 51 tackles (30 solo), one sack, one forced fumble and one fumble recovery.

=== Denver Broncos ===
On March 30, 2005, Myers was traded by Cleveland to the Denver Broncos who also received Ebenezer Ekuban in exchange for running back Reuben Droughns. With the Broncos also signing free agent Courtney Brown, as well as obtaining Ekuban and Gerard Warren in separate trades with the Browns, the local media referred to the Broncos new defensive line as the "Browncos", since all four starters were also the Browns starters the year before, under new defensive line coach Andre Patterson. He started 15 regular season games and two playoff games including the AFC Championship game versus the Pittsburgh Steelers where he made tackles. He made 50 tackles, while helping the Broncos finish with a 13–3 record which clinched the AFC West title.

In 2006, Myers started all 16 games for the Broncos and had a career high 57 combined tackles (37, 20). He had 2 sacks, 2 passes defensed and forced a fumble.

=== Cincinnati Bengals ===
On April 19, 2007, Myers signed as a free agent with the Cincinnati Bengals. He finished with 34 tackles, one sack, 2 passes defensed and his first career interception against Steve McNair of the Ravens to end Baltimore's final drive and win the game. The interception deflected off the hands of Ravens tight end Todd Heap in the end zone and thwarted the Ravens' comeback attempt in the closing seconds. His contract was terminated on August 31, 2008.

== NFL career statistics ==
Legend
**Bold**	Career high

=== Regular season ===
Year	Team	Games		Tackles				Interceptions				Fumbles			
Year	Team	GP	GS	Comb	Solo	Ast	Sck	Int	Yds	TD	Lng	FF	FR	Yds	TD
1998	DAL	16	1	15	10	5	3.0	0	0	0	0	0	0	0	0
1999	DAL	6	0	8	4	4	0.0	0	0	0	0	0	0	0	0
2000	DAL	13	7	35	28	7	0.0	0	0	0	0	**1**	1	0	0
2001	DAL	16	16	55	**37**	18	**3.5**	0	0	0	0	**1**	1	0	0
2002	DAL	16	0	35	22	13	1.0	0	0	0	0	0	1	3	0
2003	DAL	1	1	1	0	1	0.0	0	0	0	0	0	0	0	0
2003	CLE	7	1	14	8	6	3.0	0	0	0	0	0	0	0	0
2004	CLE	16	7	34	22	12	1.0	0	0	0	0	**1**	1	0	0
2005	DEN	16	15	31	25	6	1.0	0	0	0	0	0	1	0	0
2006	DEN	16	16	**57**	**37**	**20**	2.0	0	0	0	0	**1**	**2**	**11**	0
2007	CIN	15	2	36	22	14	1.0	**1**	0	0	0	0	0	0	0
		138	66	321	215	106	15.5	1	0	0	0	4	7	14	0

=== Playoffs ===
Year	Team	Games		Tackles				Interceptions				Fumbles			
Year	Team	GP	GS	Comb	Solo	Ast	Sck	Int	Yds	TD	Lng	FF	FR	Yds	TD
1998	DAL	1	1	0	0	0	0.0	0	0	0	0	0	0	0	0
1999	DAL	1	0	**7**	4	**3**	**2.0**	0	0	0	0	0	0	0	0
2005	DEN	2	2	**7**	**6**	1	1.0	0	0	0	0	0	0	0	0
		4	3	14	10	4	3.0	0	0	0	0	0	0	0	0

== Personal life ==
In the summer of 2012, he was a graduate assistant at Hinds Community College, coaching the defensive line while he pursued his master's degree. In February 2012, he joined other former players in a concussion lawsuit against the NFL.
