= 1999 Outback Bowl =

- 13th Outback Bowl
Kentucky Wildcats	Penn State Nittany Lions
(7–4)	(8–3)
SEC	Big Ten
14	26
Head coach: Hal Mumme	Head coach: Joe Paterno
	AP / Coaches / BCS; 22 / 20 / NR
	1	2	3	4	Total
Kentucky	14	0	0	0	14
Penn State	3	10	6	7	26
- Date: January 1, 1999
- Season: 1998
- Stadium: Raymond James Stadium
- Location: Tampa, Florida
- MVP: Courtney Brown (Penn State DE)
- Favorite: Penn State favored by 7
- Referee: Jim Knight (ACC)
- Attendance: 66,005

United States TV coverage
- Network: ESPN
- Announcers: Ron Franklin, Mike Gottfried, Adrian Karsten

The 1999 Outback Bowl featured the Kentucky Wildcats and the Penn State Nittany Lions. It was the 13th edition of the Outback Bowl, and the first sellout in the bowl's history.

== Summary ==
Penn State entered the game with an 8–3 record and was ranked 22nd in the AP poll; the Nittany Lions had been ranked as high as seventh in the AP poll that season. Kentucky entered the game at 7–4, unranked, though having been ranked earlier in the season in the USA Today coaches' poll. Penn State was favored by 7 points. Kentucky entered the game with three starting offensive linemen replaced by freshman reserves.

Kentucky started the scoring with a 36-yard touchdown pass from quarterback Tim Couch to wide receiver Lance Mickelsen for an early 7–0 lead. Penn State responded with a 43-yard field goal from kicker Travis Forney. Minutes later, Tim Couch found Anthony White for a 16-yard touchdown pass, to give Kentucky a 14–3 lead.

In the second quarter, Penn State quarterback Kevin Thompson connected with Joe Nastasi for a 56-yard touchdown pass, pulling Penn State to within 14–10. Travis Forney kicked a 26-yard field goal before half to make the score 14–13.

In the third quarter, Forney connected on field goals of 21 and 25 yards, to give Penn State a 19–14 lead. In the fourth quarter, Chafie Fields scored on a 19-yard touchdown run with four minutes left to give Penn State a 26–14 lead. Penn State's defense held, with that being the final score.
