= 1998 NFL season =

American football season

Regular season
- Duration: September 6 – December 28, 1998

Playoffs
- Start date: January 2, 1999
- AFC Champions: Denver Broncos
- NFC Champions: Atlanta Falcons

Super Bowl XXXIII
- Date: January 31, 1999
- Site: Pro Player Stadium, Miami
- Champions: Denver Broncos

Pro Bowl
- Date: February 7, 1999
- Site: Aloha Stadium

AFC teams: West, Central, East
NFC teams: West, Central, East

The 1998 NFL season was the 79th regular season of the National Football League (NFL). The season culminated with Super Bowl XXXIII, with the Denver Broncos defeating the Atlanta Falcons 34–19 at Pro Player Stadium in Miami. The Broncos had won their first thirteen games, the best start since the undefeated 1972 Dolphins, and were tipped by some to have a realistic chance at winning all nineteen games. The Minnesota Vikings became the first team since the 1968 Baltimore Colts to win all but one of their regular season games and not win the Super Bowl. After no team had won 14 regular season games since the 1992 49ers, three teams went 14–2 or better for the only time in a 16-game season.

== Draft ==
The 1998 NFL draft was held from April 17 to 18, 1998, at New York City's Theater at Madison Square Garden. With the first pick, the Indianapolis Colts selected quarterback Peyton Manning from the University of Tennessee.

== Referee changes ==
Dale Hamer and Gary Lane returned to head linesman and side judge, respectively. Tony Corrente and Ron Winter were promoted to referee.

Mike Pereira left the field after two seasons as a side judge to become an assistant supervisor of officials. He succeeded Jerry Seeman as Vice President of Officiating in 2001. Pereira's replacement, Terry McAulay, assumed Pereira's old position and uniform number (77). McAulay was promoted to referee in 2001 and was crew chief for three Super Bowls (XXXIX, XLIII and XLVIII).

== Major rule changes ==
- The officiating position titles of back judge and field judge were swapped to become more consistent with college and high school football. The field judge is now 20 yards deep, positioned on the same sideline as the line judge, while the back judge is 25 yards from the line of scrimmage near the center of the field.
- Tinted visors on players' facemasks are banned except for medical need.
- A defensive player can no longer flinch before the snap in an attempt to draw movement from an offensive lineman.
- A team will be penalized immediately for having 12 players in a huddle even if the 12th player goes straight to the sideline as the huddle breaks.
- During the season, the rules regarding the coin toss were changed to where the visiting team must make the call before the coin is tossed instead of while it was in the air. On Thanksgiving, the game between the Pittsburgh Steelers and Detroit Lions went to overtime. During the coin toss, Steelers running back Jerome Bettis was heard calling "tails" but referee Phil Luckett claimed he said "heads". The coin landed on tails, and the Lions won the toss and eventually the game on a Jason Hanson field goal. It was later revealed that Bettis had changed his mind during the call and was originally going to call "heads" but stopped. Thus, the rule change was adopted to prevent any further confusion.

== Preseason ==
=== Hall of Fame Game ===
The 1998 Hall of Fame Class included Paul Krause, Tommy McDonald, Anthony Muñoz, an offensive lineman for the Cincinnati Bengals, Mike Singletary, a member of the Chicago Bears Super Bowl XX championship team, and Dwight Stephenson, a Pro Bowl offensive lineman with the Miami Dolphins.

== Regular season ==
=== Kickoff time changes ===
This was the first season where the late games kicked off at 4:05 p.m. ET (for those games on the single game network) and 4:15 p.m. ET (for those on the doubleheader network), replacing the original 4:00 p.m. ET start time to give networks more time to finish the early games before the start of the late games. Dallas' Thanksgiving game was also likewise moved from 4:00 to 4:15 ET. The 4:15 start time would last until 2011 when kickoff times would be pushed later to give networks even more time between games.

Monday Night Football broadcasts were also pushed back from its 9:00 p.m. ET start time to 8:00 p.m. ET, with the actual kickoffs at 8:20 p.m. to allow for a 20 minute pregame show.

=== Scheduling formula ===
Inter-conference
AFC East vs NFC West
AFC Central vs NFC Central
AFC West vs NFC East

Highlights of the 1998 season included:

- Thanksgiving: Two games were played on Thursday, November 26, featuring the Pittsburgh Steelers at the Detroit Lions and the Minnesota Vikings at the Dallas Cowboys, with the Lions and Vikings winning. The Steelers-Lions game is notable for going into overtime, where the Steelers' Jerome Bettis called the coin toss in the air, but referee Phil Luckett awarded the Lions the ball after he thought Bettis tried to call both heads and tails at the same time. The Lions went on to kick a field goal on the first possession, winning 19–16. In the other game, Vikings rookie wide receiver Randy Moss caught three touchdowns, all of over 50 yards in a 46–36 win.

=== Final standings ===
AFC East
	W	L	T	PCT	PF	PA	STK
^{(2)} New York Jets	12	4	0	.750	416	266	W6
^{(4)} Miami Dolphins	10	6	0	.625	321	265	L1
^{(5)} Buffalo Bills	10	6	0	.625	400	333	W1
^{(6)} New England Patriots	9	7	0	.563	337	329	L1
Indianapolis Colts	3	13	0	.188	310	444	L2

AFC Central
	W	L	T	PCT	PF	PA	STK
^{(3)} Jacksonville Jaguars	11	5	0	.688	392	338	W1
Tennessee Oilers	8	8	0	.500	330	320	L2
Pittsburgh Steelers	7	9	0	.438	263	303	L5
Baltimore Ravens	6	10	0	.375	269	335	W1
Cincinnati Bengals	3	13	0	.188	268	452	L1

AFC West
	W	L	T	PCT	PF	PA	STK
^{(1)} Denver Broncos	14	2	0	.875	501	309	W1
Oakland Raiders	8	8	0	.500	288	356	L1
Seattle Seahawks	8	8	0	.500	372	310	L1
Kansas City Chiefs	7	9	0	.438	327	363	W1
San Diego Chargers	5	11	0	.313	241	342	L5

NFC East
	W	L	T	PCT	PF	PA	STK
^{(3)} Dallas Cowboys	10	6	0	.625	381	275	W2
^{(6)} Arizona Cardinals	9	7	0	.563	325	378	W3
New York Giants	8	8	0	.500	287	309	W4
Washington Redskins	6	10	0	.375	319	421	L1
Philadelphia Eagles	3	13	0	.188	161	344	L3

NFC Central
	W	L	T	PCT	PF	PA	STK
^{(1)} Minnesota Vikings	15	1	0	.938	556	296	W8
^{(5)} Green Bay Packers	11	5	0	.688	408	319	W3
Tampa Bay Buccaneers	8	8	0	.500	314	295	W1
Detroit Lions	5	11	0	.313	306	378	L4
Chicago Bears	4	12	0	.250	276	368	L1

NFC West
	W	L	T	PCT	PF	PA	STK
^{(2)} Atlanta Falcons	14	2	0	.875	442	289	W9
^{(4)} San Francisco 49ers	12	4	0	.750	479	328	W1
New Orleans Saints	6	10	0	.375	305	359	L3
Carolina Panthers	4	12	0	.250	336	413	W2
St. Louis Rams	4	12	0	.250	285	378	L2

=== Tiebreakers ===
- Miami finished ahead of Buffalo in the AFC East based on better net division points (6 to Bills' 0).
- Oakland finished ahead of Seattle in the AFC West based on head-to-head sweep (2–0).
- Carolina finished ahead of St. Louis in the NFC West based on head-to-head sweep (2–0).

== Playoffs ==
Jan 3 – Alltel Stadium	Jan 10 – Giants Stadium
6	New England	10
3	Jacksonville	24
3	Jacksonville	25	Jan 17 – Mile High Stadium
2	NY Jets	34
AFC
Jan 2 – Pro Player Stadium	2	NY Jets	10
Jan 9 – Mile High Stadium
1	Denver	23
5	Buffalo	17	AFC Championship
4	Miami	3
4	Miami	24	Jan 31 – Pro Player Stadium
1	Denver	38
Wild-card round
Divisional round
Jan 3 – 3Com Park	A1	Denver	34
Jan 9 – Georgia Dome
N2	Atlanta	19
5	Green Bay	27	Super Bowl XXXIII
4	San Francisco	18
4	San Francisco	30	Jan 17 – Hubert H. Humphrey Metrodome
2	Atlanta	20
NFC
Jan 2 – Texas Stadium	2	Atlanta	30*
Jan 10 – Hubert H. Humphrey Metrodome
1	Minnesota	27
6	Arizona	20	NFC Championship
6	Arizona	21
3	Dallas	7
1	Minnesota	41

* Indicates overtime victory

== Statistical leaders ==
=== Team ===
Points scored	Minnesota Vikings (556)
Total yards gained	San Francisco 49ers (6,800)
Yards rushing	San Francisco 49ers (2,544)
Yards passing	Minnesota Vikings (4,328)
Fewest points allowed	Miami Dolphins (265)
Fewest total yards allowed	San Diego Chargers (4,208)
Fewest rushing yards allowed	San Diego Chargers (1,140)
Fewest passing yards allowed	Philadelphia Eagles (2,720)

=== Individual ===
Scoring	Gary Anderson, Minnesota (164 points)
Touchdowns	Terrell Davis, Denver (23 TDs)
Most field goals made	Al Del Greco, Tennessee (36 FGs)
Rushing	Terrell Davis, Denver (2,008 yards)
Passing	Randall Cunningham, Minnesota, (106.0 rating)
Passing touchdowns	Steve Young, San Francisco (36 TDs)
Pass receiving	O.J. McDuffie, Miami (90 catches)
Pass receiving yards	Antonio Freeman, Green Bay (1,424)
Receiving touchdowns	Randy Moss, Minnesota (17 touchdowns)
Punt returns	Deion Sanders, Dallas (15.6 average yards)
Kickoff returns	Terry Fair, Detroit (28.0 average yards)
Interceptions	Ty Law, New England (8)
Punting	Craig Hentrich, Tennessee (47.2 average yards)
Sacks	Michael Sinclair, Seattle (16.5)

== Awards ==
Most Valuable Player	Terrell Davis, running back, Denver
Coach of the Year	Dan Reeves, Atlanta
Offensive Player of the Year	Terrell Davis, running back, Denver
Defensive Player of the Year	Reggie White, defensive end, Green Bay
Offensive Rookie of the Year	Randy Moss, wide receiver, Minnesota
Defensive Rookie of the Year	Charles Woodson, cornerback, Oakland
NFL Comeback Player of the Year	Doug Flutie, quarterback, Buffalo
NFL Man of the Year	Dan Marino, quarterback, Miami
Super Bowl Most Valuable Player	John Elway, quarterback, Denver

== Coaching changes ==
=== Offseason ===
- Oakland Raiders – Jon Gruden; replaced Joe Bugel, who was fired after the 1997 season.
- Indianapolis Colts – Jim Mora; replaced Lindy Infante, who was fired after the 1997 season.
- Dallas Cowboys – Chan Gailey; replaced Barry Switzer, who resigned after the 1997 season.
- Buffalo Bills – Wade Phillips; replaced Marv Levy, who retired after the 1997 season.

=== In-season ===
- San Diego Chargers - June Jones; replaced Kevin Gilbride, who was fired after Week 6 of the 1998 season.
- Atlanta Falcons - Rich Brooks; served as interim head coach for Weeks 16 and 17 of the 1998 season while Dan Reeves recovered from quadruple bypass surgery.

== Stadium changes ==
- Baltimore Ravens: The Ravens moved from Memorial Stadium to Ravens Stadium at Camden Yards
- Buffalo Bills: Rich Stadium was renamed Ralph Wilson Stadium after Bills founder and owner Ralph Wilson
- Oakland Raiders: The Oakland Coliseum was renamed Network Associates Coliseum after the software company Network Associates acquired the naming rights
- Tampa Bay Buccaneers: The Buccaneers moved from Houlihan's Stadium to Raymond James Stadium, with Raymond James Financial acquiring the naming rights
- Tennessee Oilers: The Oilers moved from the Liberty Bowl Memorial Stadium in Memphis to Vanderbilt Stadium in Nashville

== New uniforms ==
- The Baltimore Ravens began wearing their white pants instead of black with their white jerseys.
- The Detroit Lions wore blue pants and silver-topped socks with their white jerseys for this season only.
- The Jacksonville Jaguars removed the black side panels on uniforms.
- The New York Jets unveiled a modernized version of the team's classic design and logo used from 1964 to 1977.
- The San Diego Chargers returned to navy pants with their white jerseys.
- The San Francisco 49ers switched from white to gold pants.

== Television ==
This was the first season that CBS held the rights to televise AFC games, taking over from NBC. Meanwhile, this was the first time that ESPN broadcast all of the Sunday night games throughout the season (this was also the first season in which ESPN's coverage used the Monday Night Football themes, before reverting to using an original theme in 2001). ABC and Fox renewed their rights for Monday Night Football and the NFC package, respectively. All of these networks signed eight-year television contracts through the 2005 season.

MNF broadcasts were pushed to an 8:00 p.m. ET start time. The actual kickoffs were at 8:20 p.m., preceded by a new pregame show hosted by Chris Berman. Frank Gifford was then reassigned as a special contributor to the pregame show, while Boomer Esiason replaced Gifford in the booth.

Longtime CBS Sports announcer Jim Nantz was named as the host of the revived The NFL Today pregame show, with Marcus Allen, Brent Jones, and George Seifert with Mike Lombardi replacing Seifert by week 13 as analysts. For its new lead broadcast team, CBS hired Greg Gumbel (who hosted The NFL Today from 1990-93) and Phil Simms from NBC. Randy Cross also came from NBC, and was paired with longtime CBS Sports announcer Verne Lundquist to form the network's new #2 crew. Kevin Harlan also came over from FOX.

Fox hired Cris Collinsworth from NBC to replace Ronnie Lott as one of the Fox NFL Sunday analysts. Longtime broadcaster Tim Ryan joined for one season on play by play.

ESPN hired Paul Maguire from NBC to join Mike Patrick and Joe Theismann in a three-man booth.

=== Official AFC team affiliates ===
Team	Affiliate
Baltimore Ravens	WJZ-TV
Buffalo Bills	WIVB
Cincinnati Bengals	WKRC
Denver Broncos	KCNC
Indianapolis Colts	WISH-TV
Jacksonville Jaguars	WJAX
Kansas City Chiefs	KCTV
Miami Dolphins	WFOR
New England Patriots	WBZ-TV
New York Jets	WCBS
Oakland Raiders	KPIX
Pittsburgh Steelers	KDKA
San Diego Chargers	KFMB
Seattle Seahawks	KIRO-TV
Tennessee Oilers	WTVF
