= Raymond James Stadium =

Stadium in Tampa, Florida

- Ray Jay; The New Sombrero

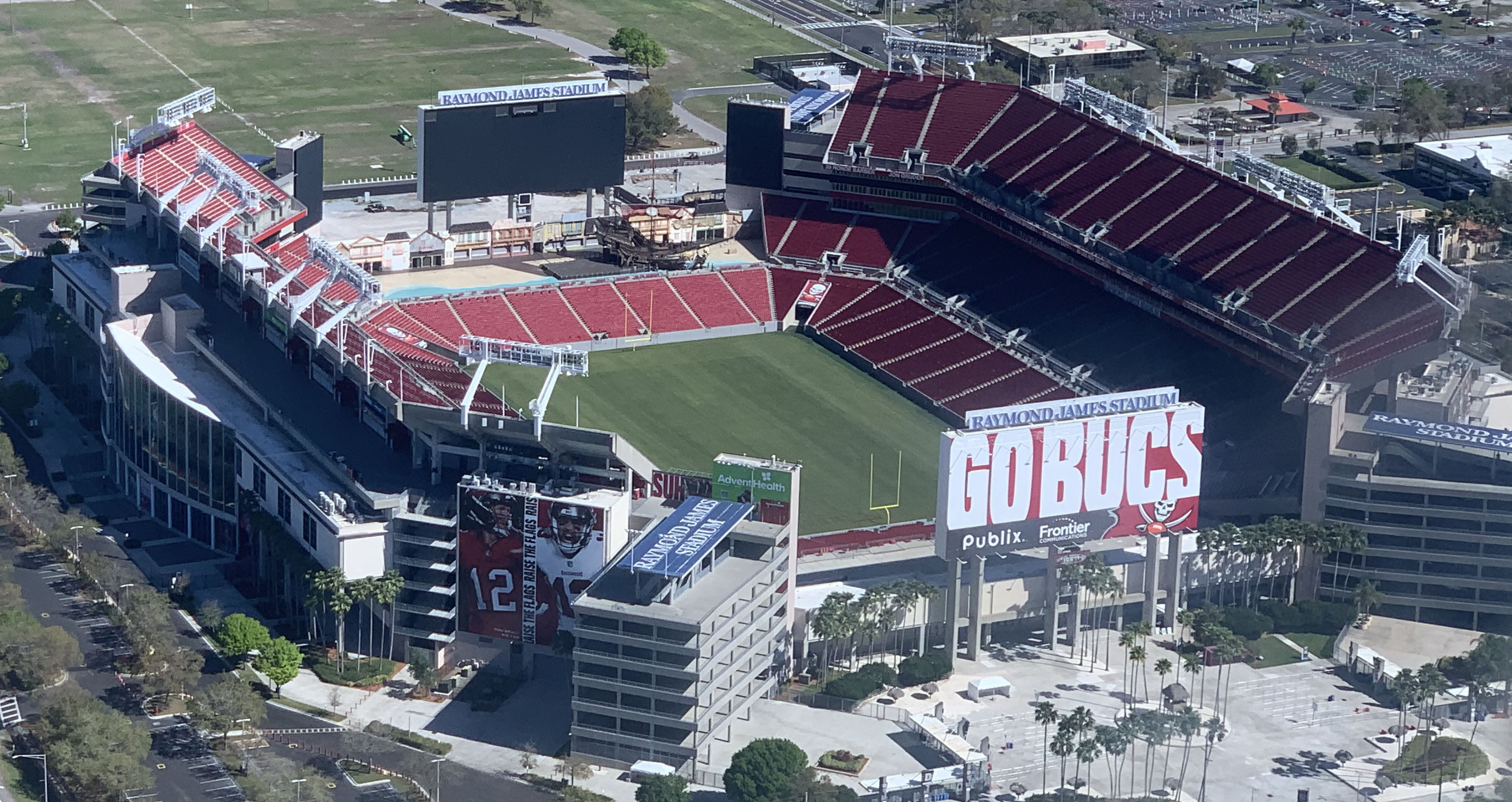
- Raymond James Stadium in 2021

- Location in Florida Location in the United States
- Address: 4201 North Dale Mabry Highway
- Location: Tampa, Florida, U.S.
- Coordinates: 27°58′33″N 82°30′12″W
- Owner: Hillsborough County
- Operator: Tampa Sports Authority
- Capacity: 69,218 (2022–present, expandable to 75,000) Former capacity: List: 65,618 (2016–2021); 65,890 (2013–2015); 65,856 (2008–2012); 65,657 (2001–2007); 66,321 (1998–2000)
- Executive suites: 195
- Surface: Tifway 419 Bermuda grass
- Record attendance: 74,512 (2017 CFP National Championship Game)

Construction
- Groundbreaking: October 15, 1996
- Opened: September 20, 1998
- Cost: $168.5 million ($333 million in 2025)
- Architects: Wagner Murray Architects; Populous (then HOK Sport)
- Structural engineers: Walter P Moore; Bliss and Nyitray, Inc.
- Services engineers: ME Engineers; FSC-Inc.
- General contractors: Manhattan Construction, Hunt/Metric Joint Venture

Tenants
- Tampa Bay Buccaneers (NFL) (1998–present); South Florida Bulls (NCAA) (1998–present); Tampa Bay Mutiny (MLS) (1999–2001); ReliaQuest Bowl (NCAA) (1999–present); Gasparilla Bowl (NCAA) (2018–present); Florida–Georgia football rivalry (NCAA) (2027); Tampa Bay Vipers (XFL) (2020)

Website
- raymondjamesstadium.com

Raymond James Stadium is a multi-purpose stadium in Tampa, Florida, United States. It opened in 1998 and is home to the Tampa Bay Buccaneers of the National Football League (NFL) and the University of South Florida (USF) Bulls college football program. The seating capacity for most sporting events is 69,218, though it can be expanded to about 75,000 for special events with the addition of temporary seating. Raymond James Stadium was built at public expense as a replacement for Tampa Stadium and is known for the replica pirate ship located behind the seating area in the north end zone. Raymond James Financial, a financial service firm headquartered in St. Petersburg, has held the naming rights for the stadium for the stadium's entire existence.

Besides serving as the home field for the Buccaneers and the Bulls, the facility has been the site of three Super Bowls: XXXV in 2001, XLIII in 2009, and LV in 2021, the third of which the Buccaneers became the first team in NFL history both to play and to win a Super Bowl on their home field. In college football, Raymond James Stadium is the home of the annual ReliaQuest Bowl (since 1999) and Gasparilla Bowl (since 2018), hosted the ACC Championship Game in 2008 and 2009, and was the site of the College Football Playoff National Championship in 2017. Additionally, the stadium has hosted a wide variety of non-football events, including soccer matches, equestrian sports competitions, monster truck shows, and large concerts. It was also the site of WrestleMania 37 in April 2021.

== History ==
=== Financing and construction ===
Immediately upon purchasing the Buccaneers in 1995, new owner Malcolm Glazer declared that twenty-eight year old Tampa Stadium was inadequate to justify the record $192 million he paid for the NFL franchise and began lobbying local government for a replacement. A few months later, the city of Tampa and Hillsborough County unveiled plans for a $168 million stadium that was to be paid for with a rental car surtax along with fees on items relating to stadium events, such as ticket surcharges and parking fees. However, the Glazer family rejected the plan within hours because it would reduce their revenue, and when local and state government officials did not agree on an alternative taxpayer-financed plan quickly enough for their liking, they threatened to move the Buccaneers elsewhere and were soon meeting with officials from several other cities to explore possible relocation sites.

In early 1996, the city of Tampa and Hillsborough County proposed the establishment of a "Community Investment Tax", a 30-year half-cent sales tax increase that would pay for various public improvements along with a new stadium for the Bucs. The tax increase would have to be approved in a public referendum, which was scheduled for September. The "Community Investment Tax Stadium" (CITS) proposal was heavily promoted by the team along with several prominent local officials, and as part of intensive public relation campaign, Malcolm Glazer repeatedly promised to pay half the cost of the new stadium if fans put down 50,000 deposits on 10–year season ticket commitments priced at $190 to $2500 per seat. Former Tampa mayor Bill Poe sued to halt the referendum, as he claimed that the tax violated the Florida state constitution's ban on public support for private companies. Poe's objections were rejected, and plans for the vote were allowed to proceed.

Public opinion polls indicated that support for the CITS proposal was still limited as election day neared, with the main reasons being a "negative reaction" to the Glazers' tactics and unwillingness to raise taxes to "help" owners who "overpaid" for an NFL team. In response, stadium proponents launched a "media blitz" of television and radio advertisements emphasizing the tax's potential impact on local schools and roads in an attempt to persuade residents who did not want to pay for a football stadium to "hold their nose" and vote yes anyway. On September 3, 1996, the ballot measure passed by a margin of 53% to 47%. After the vote, the season ticket deposit drive fell 17,000 short of its 50,000 goal at the team-imposed deadline, the Buccaneers' offer to pay half of stadium construction costs was withdrawn, and the facility was designed and built entirely at public expense.

Before construction began on the stadium, the Buccaneers and the Tampa Sports Authority signed a lease in which local government paid the vast majority of operating and maintenance expenses while the franchise kept almost all of the proceeds from all events held there. Former Tampa mayor Bill Poe went back to court to challenge the legality of the lease, again citing the state's constitutional ban on using tax dollars to enrich a private business in claiming that the "sweetheart deal" should be voided. A local court ruled in Poe's favor, but upon appeal, the Supreme Court of Florida ruled that the lease was constitutional because the stadium provided a "public benefit", and construction continued as planned.

In 1998, a 13-year deal was agreed with Raymond James Financial, headquartered in St. Petersburg, for naming rights to the stadium. The deal was extended for 10 years in 2006 and again in 2016, and the deal is currently set to expire in 2027.

=== Opening, further developments ===
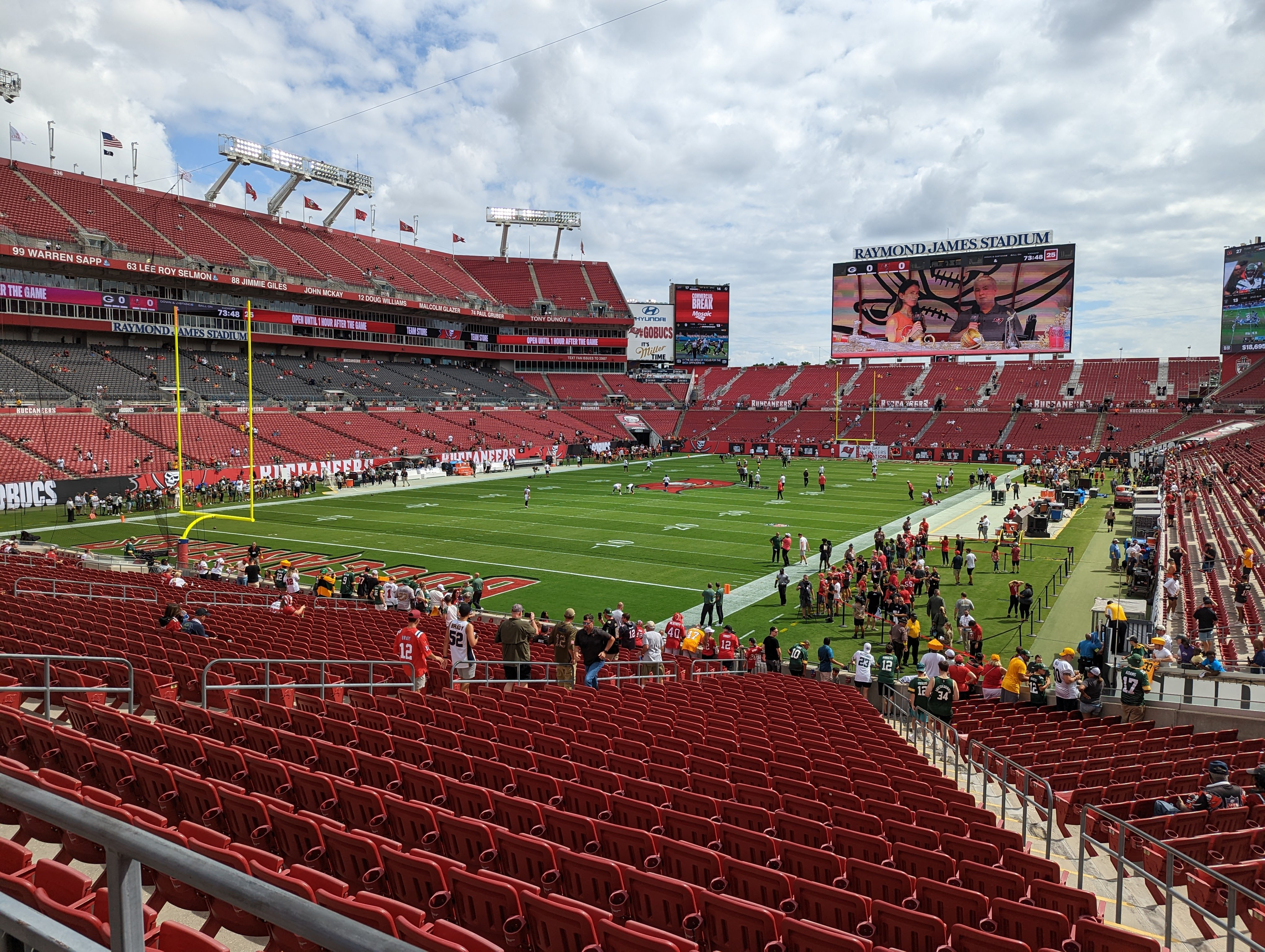
View of Raymond James Stadium with the new Krewe's Nest seating expansion in the south end zone in 2022

The stadium officially opened on September 20, 1998, when the Buccaneers defeated the Bears, 27–15. The stadium hosted its first Major League Soccer match on March 20, 1999, after the Tampa Bay Mutiny relocated from Houlihan's Stadium; the Mutiny lost their first match at Raymond James 5–2 to D.C. United with 16,872 in attendance. The Mutiny folded after the 2001 season after facing declining revenue due to declining attendance and the Bucs' lease at Raymond James Stadium, which saw the Mutiny receiving no money from parking or concessions. They played their last home match on September 9, 2001, a 2–1 loss to the Columbus Crew. The team had an average attendance of 10,479 per match in their final season at Raymond James Stadium.

In April 2003, the Tampa Sports Authority proposed passing ownership of the stadium to Hillsborough County to avoid having to pay millions of dollars in property taxes (the Bucs' lease agreement dictated that they not have to pay property taxes). However, Bucs had a right of refusal and refused to sign off on the plan unless the local government paid more of the cost for gameday security and increased the amount of (county-purchased) insurance coverage for the stadium. The dispute continued for months until December 2003, when the county legally declared the stadium a condominium and took ownership. As part of the change, the Bucs were given ownership of portions of the structure. To win the Bucs' approval, the county agreed to refund the team's resultant property tax payments annually.

After a nearly two-year legal battle, the Tampa Sports Authority came to a settlement with popular sports-seating and telescopic platform/bleacher company Hussey Seating of North Berwick, Maine. Following the stadium's opening in 1998, roughly 50,000 Hussey-manufactured seats at Raymond James Stadium began to fade from their original color – a bright, vibrant shade of red – to a shade of washed-out pink. Spotting this obvious defect, the Buccaneers organization pleaded to the TSA to sue the seating manufacturing company for the cost to replace the affected chairs in 2003. Initially, in May 2004, after testing samples of the seats, Hussey Seating did not find any cause for the fading, and thus, found no reason to replace the seats at the company's cost under the current 10–year warranty. After the TSA cited a portion of the warranty which did, in fact, state that Hussey would replace seats if any fading were to occur, Hussey president Tim Hussey admitted an error in the research and eventually would come to a $1.5 million agreement with the TSA to replace the problem seats. Reportedly, the seat-fading occurred due to a manufacturing error by Hussey, as a UV inhibitor – a sunscreen-like component for the plastic – was forgotten in the mixture used to create the seats. All of the problem seats were replaced by new, non–pink seats in the spring of 2006.

In December 2015, the Buccaneers and the Tampa Sports Authority reached an agreement to complete over $100 million in improvements and renovations to the stadium. The negotiations took months, and were extended by Bucs' lawyers demanding additional concessions after an agreement was near in September 2015. In the end, the upgrades were paid with at least $29 million of public money, with the remainder paid for by the Bucs in exchange for the right to play a home game at another site beginning in the 2018 season and other concessions. Renovations began in January 2016, and the first phase was complete in time for the 2016 football season.

== Features ==
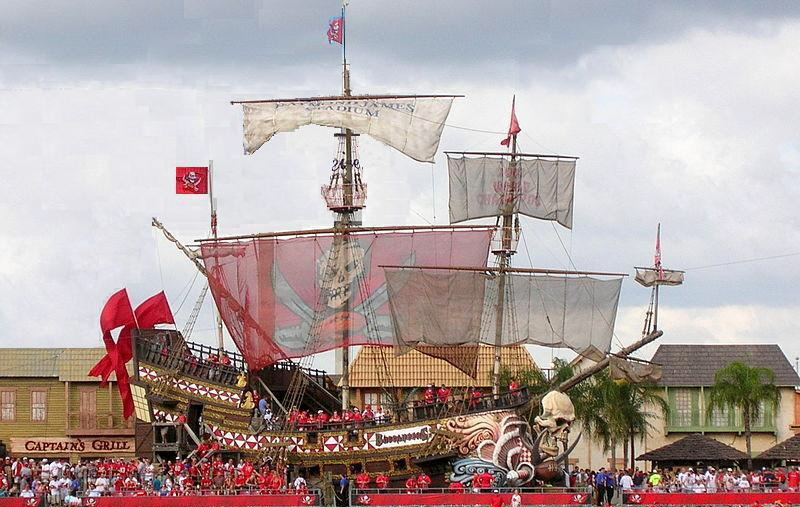
The pirate ship at Raymond James Stadium

One of the most recognizable features of the stadium is a 103-foot (31 m), 43-ton steel-and-concrete replica pirate ship in the north end zone, making it stand out from other NFL stadiums. Each time the Buccaneers score points or win a home game, the replica cannons on the ship are fired off. The cannons fire once for each point scored. In addition, when the Buccaneers enter their opponent's red zone, the cannons fire once, and flags are hoisted and waved around the stadium. The cannons are also used during pre-game player introductions. During various times throughout the game, the song "Yo Ho (A Pirate's Life for Me)" is played on the stadium public address system (taken from Pirates of the Caribbean), which signals patrons on board the ship to throw beads, T-shirts, and other free prizes to the spectators below. The segment is also known as a "Mini Gasparilla" to most fans. An animated parrot sits on the stern of the pirate ship. Controlled by radio and remote control, the parrot picks fans out of the crowd and talks to those passing by. The pirate ship's sails, which for NFL games usually shows Buccaneers logos and sponsors, are often changed to suit the event that it hosts.

The two "Buc Vision" 2,200-square-foot (200 m^{2}) Daktronics video displays were among the largest in the league when they were built. In 2016 they were replaced with 9,600-square-foot (890 m^{2}), HD video boards in both end zones. 'Buccaneer Cove' in the north end zone features a weathered, two–story fishing village facade, housing stadium concessions and restrooms. All areas of the stadium are ADA compliant.

Temporary bleachers were erected in the end zones for Super Bowl XXXV, which set a then-record stadium attendance of 71,921. The stadium attendance record has since been surpassed by the 2017 College Football Playoff National Championship, which also made use of temporary seating. Super Bowl XLIII and Super Bowl LV used temporary seating as well.

In 2003, the corner billboards in the stadium were replaced with rotating trilon billboards. Those were subsequently replaced in 2016 with high visibility video displays.

Raymond James Stadium boasts the second-best turf in the NFL, according to a 2009 biannual players' survey.

In early 2016, the stadium was given an extensive facelift. The most notable improvement was the replacement of the 2,200-square-foot (200 m^{2}) video displays with state of the art, high visibility 9,600-square-foot (890 m^{2}) video displays in both the north and south end zones along with the addition of a new 2,300-square-foot (210 m^{2}) video tower in each corner. All together, the video displays cover more than 28,000-square-foot (2,600 m^{2}), the third-largest video displays in the NFL. The original sound system and the stadium's luxury boxes were also upgraded.

Before the 2022 season, some of the temporary seats used for Super Bowls and other special events were set up in the south end zone, bringing the capacity to 69,218. They were removed after the season, following Tom Brady’s retirement.

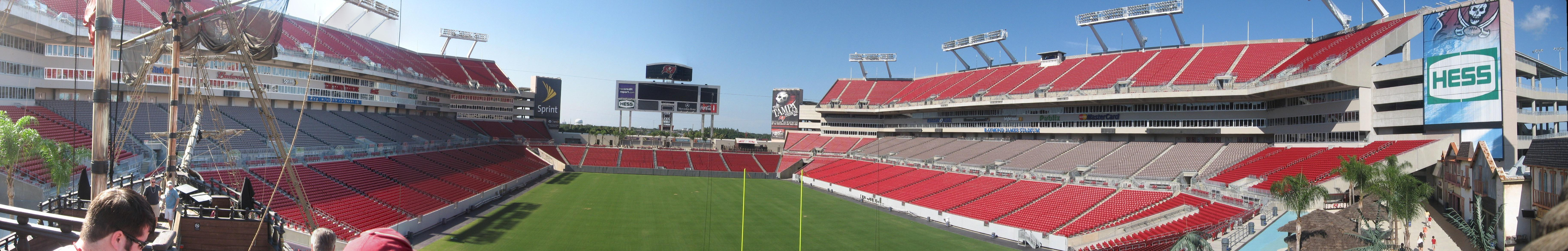
Panoramic view of Raymond James Stadium from the pirate ship (2009).

== Naming ==
During construction, the facility was known as Tampa Community Stadium. In June 1998, prior to its opening, the naming rights were bought by St. Petersburg-based Raymond James Financial for $32.5 million in a 13–year agreement. Contract extensions signed in 2006 and 2016 have extended the naming rights deal through 2028.

The stadium is referred to as "Ray Jay". Somewhat derisively, it has been occasionally referred to as "the CITS", a name coined by long-time local sportscaster Chris Thomas which stands for "Community Investment Tax Stadium", referring to the fact that the stadium was entirely financed by local taxpayers.

== Notable events ==
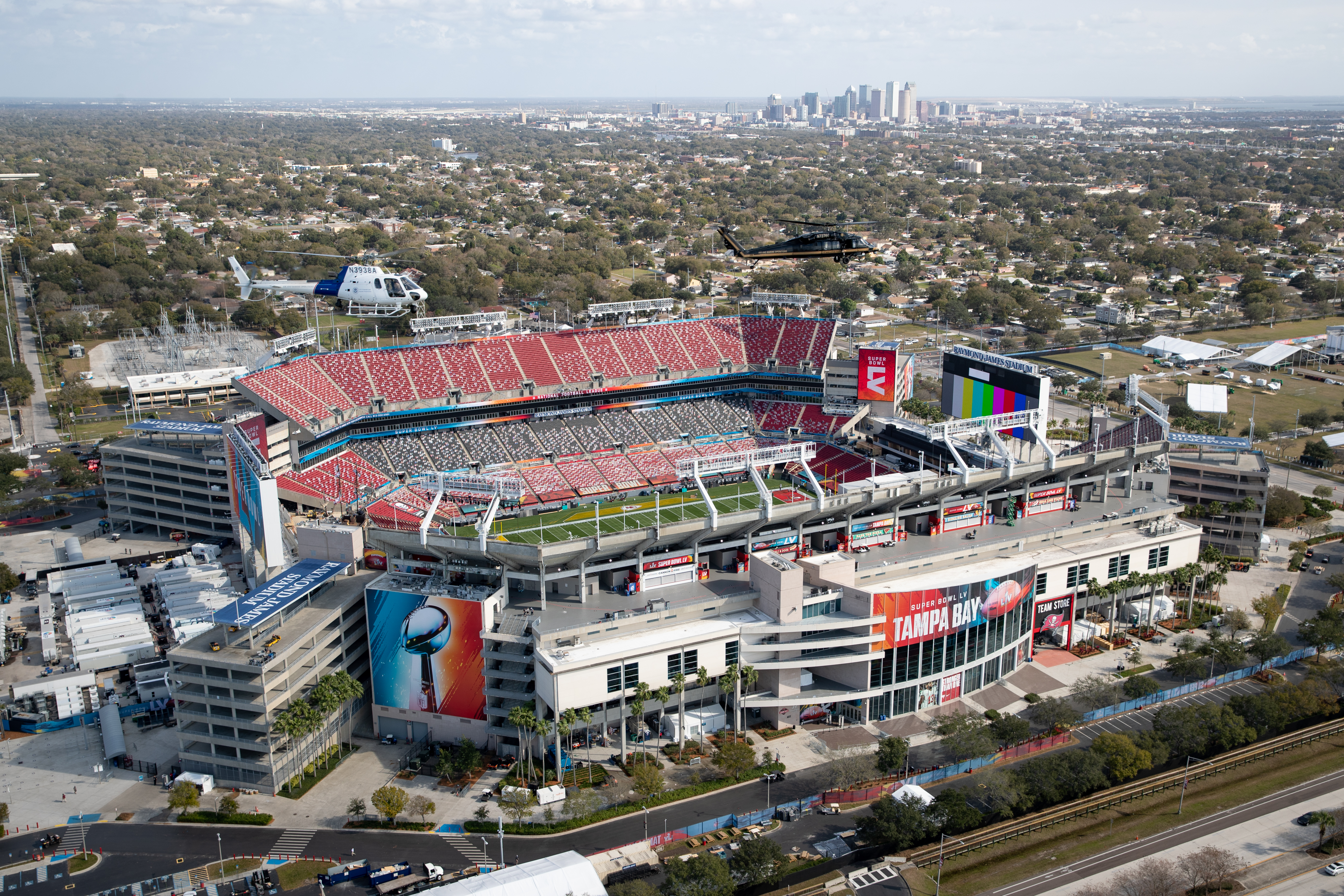
Overhead view of Raymond James Stadium during the lead-up to Super Bowl LV.

=== American Football ===
==== Super Bowl ====
Exterior of Raymond James Stadium with signage for the Tampa Bay Buccaneers in 2026

Raymond James Stadium has hosted the Super Bowl three times: Super Bowl XXXV in 2001, Super Bowl XLIII in 2009, and Super Bowl LV in 2021. In Super Bowl LV, the Buccaneers became the first team in NFL history to play a Super Bowl in their home stadium, which they won 31–9. Like previous Super Bowls, the league treated Super Bowl LV as a neutral site game, with the pirate ship's Buccaneer-logo sails replaced with Super Bowl sails. The league also did not allow the Buccaneers to fire the ship's cannons during the game. The cannons are normally fired after every score by the Buccaneers and when their offense enters the red zone. The cannons were only fired during player introductions and were fired 31 times after the end of the game to represent the Buccaneers' 31 points. The Buccaneers were coincidentally the designated home team for Super Bowl LV, as the home team alternates between the two conferences annually.

Season	Game	Date	Winning team	Score	Losing team	Score	Attendance
2000	Super Bowl XXXV	January 28, 2001	Baltimore Ravens	34	New York Giants	7	71,921
2008	Super Bowl XLIII	February 1, 2009	Pittsburgh Steelers	27	Arizona Cardinals	23	70,774
2020	Super Bowl LV	February 7, 2021	Tampa Bay Buccaneers	31	Kansas City Chiefs	9	24,835 (Note: Played with limited capacity due to COVID-19)

==== NFL playoffs ====
Season	Game	Date	Winning team	Score	Losing team	Score	Attendance
1999	NFC Divisional	January 15, 2000	2 Tampa Bay Buccaneers	14	3 Washington Redskins	13	65,835
2002	NFC Divisional	January 12, 2003	2 Tampa Bay Buccaneers	31	4 San Francisco 49ers	6	65,599
2005	NFC Wild Card	January 7, 2006	6 Washington Redskins	17	3 Tampa Bay Buccaneers	10	65,514
2007	NFC Wild Card	January 6, 2008	5 New York Giants	24	4 Tampa Bay Buccaneers	14	65,621
2021	NFC Wild Card	January 16, 2022	2 Tampa Bay Buccaneers	31	7 Philadelphia Eagles	15	65,077
2021	NFC Divisional	January 23, 2022	4 Los Angeles Rams	30	2 Tampa Bay Buccaneers	27	65,597
2022	NFC Wild Card	January 16, 2023	5 Dallas Cowboys	31	4 Tampa Bay Buccaneers	14	69,145
2023	NFC Wild Card	January 15, 2024	4 Tampa Bay Buccaneers	32	5 Philadelphia Eagles	9	63,397
2024	NFC Wild Card	January 12, 2025	6 Washington Commanders	23	3 Tampa Bay Buccaneers	20	64,614

==== Tampa Bay Buccaneers regular season games ====
The three highest-attended Buccaneers regular season home games at Raymond James Stadium are as follows. For the 2022 season, temporary bleachers were erected in the south endzone. The "Krewe's Nest" raised the stadium's capacity by approximately 3,600 additional seats. The largest crowd prior to the temporary seating occurred on October 22, 2006 against Philadelphia (65,808). After the temporary seating was removed for 2023, the largest crowd has been 65,854 against Detroit on October 15, 2023.

Rank	Season	Game	Date	Winning team	Score	Losing team	Score	Attendance
1	2022	Week 15	December 18, 2022	Cincinnati Bengals	34	Tampa Bay Buccaneers	23	69,305
2	2022	Week 17	January 1, 2023	Tampa Bay Buccaneers	30	Carolina Panthers	24	69,298
3	2022	Week 3	September 26, 2022	Green Bay Packers	14	Tampa Bay Buccaneers	12	69,197
Games without temporary endzone seating
1	2023	Week 6	October 15, 2023	Detroit Lions	20	Tampa Bay Buccaneers	6	65,854
2	2006	Week 7	October 22, 2006	Tampa Bay Buccaneers	23	Philadelphia Eagles	21	65,808
3	2021	Week 15 (SNF)	December 19, 2021	New Orleans Saints	9	Tampa Bay Buccaneers	0	65,744

==== USF games ====
The three highest-attended South Florida Bulls home games at Raymond James Stadium are as follows:

Rank	Season	Date	Winning team	Score	Losing team	Score	Attendance
1	2012	September 29, 2012	4 Florida State Seminoles	30	South Florida Bulls	17	69,383
2	2007	September 28, 2007	18 South Florida Bulls	21	5 West Virginia Mountaineers	13	67,012
3	2009	November 28, 2009	19 Miami Hurricanes	31	South Florida Bulls	10	66,469

==== College Football Playoff ====
In 2017, Raymond James Stadium hosted the College Football Playoff National Championship, where the Clemson Tigers defeated the Alabama Crimson Tide in a rematch of the 2016 championship. With an attendance of 74,512, it was the largest crowd for a football game in stadium history. In 2029, Raymond James Stadium will host its second College Football Playoff National Championship, replacing the original host AT&T Stadium in Arlington, Texas after a scheduling conflict forced the move.

Season	Game	Date	Winning team	Score	Losing team	Score	Attendance
2016	College Football Playoff National Championship	January 9, 2017	2 Clemson Tigers	35	1 Alabama Crimson Tide	31	74,512

==== Bowl games ====
The three highest-attended college football bowl games that took place at Raymond James Stadium are as follows:

Rank	Season	Game	Date	Winning team	Score	Losing team	Score	Attendance
1	2001	Outback Bowl	January 1, 2002	14 South Carolina Gamecocks	31	22 Ohio State Buckeyes	28	66,249
2	1998	Outback Bowl	January 1, 1999	22 Penn State Nittany Lions	26	Kentucky Wildcats	14	66,005
3	2005	Outback Bowl	January 2, 2006	16 Florida Gators	31	25 Iowa Hawkeyes	24	65,881

=== Soccer ===
The stadium was home to the former Tampa Bay Mutiny of Major League Soccer and continues to periodically host other soccer matches due to its accommodating field dimensions.

On June 8, 2012, it hosted the United States men's national soccer team's opening qualifying match against Antigua and Barbuda for the 2014 FIFA World Cup, which the United States won 3–1. On October 11, 2018, the Colombia men's national soccer team played against the United States men's national soccer team and won 4–2 to set the current attendance record of 38,361 for a soccer match at this stadium.

The stadium hosted a 2021 CONCACAF Champions League match between Toronto FC and Cruz Azul.

Major League Soccer returned to the stadium on February 14, 2025, for a preseason game between Orlando City SC and Inter Miami CF, the two current MLS teams in Florida. The game ended in a 2–2 draw in front of 42,017 fans.

==== Men's international matches ====
Date	Winning Team	Result	Losing Team	Tournament	Spectators
March 25, 2007	United States	3–1	Ecuador	Friendly	31,547
February 24, 2010	United States	2–1	El Salvador	Friendly	21,737
June 11, 2011	Canada	1–0	Guadeloupe	2011 CONCACAF Gold Cup	27,731
June 11, 2011	Panama	2–1	United States	2011 CONCACAF Gold Cup	27,731
June 8, 2012	United States	3–1	Antigua and Barbuda	2014 FIFA World Cup qualification	23,971
June 2, 2014	Japan	3–1	Costa Rica	Friendly	7,106
June 6, 2014	Japan	4–3	Zambia	Friendly	7,275
July 12, 2017	Panama	2–1	Nicaragua	2017 CONCACAF Gold Cup	23,368
July 12, 2017	United States	3–2	Martinique	2017 CONCACAF Gold Cup	23,368
October 11, 2018	Colombia	4–2	United States	Friendly	38,631
September 10, 2019	Colombia	0–0	Venezuela	Friendly	16,590
November 18, 2025	United States	5–1	Uruguay	Friendly	26,110
June 6, 2026	England	1–0	New Zealand	Friendly	

==== Women's international matches ====
Date	Winning Team	Result	Losing Team	Tournament	Spectators
November 8, 2008	United States	1–0	South Korea	Friendly	4,263
June 14, 2014	United States	1–0	France	Friendly	9,799
March 3, 2016	United States	1–0	England	2016 SheBelieves Cup	13,027
March 5, 2019	United States	1–0	Brazil	2019 SheBelieves Cup	14,009

=== Ice hockey ===
On February 1, 2026, the Tampa Bay Lightning and Boston Bruins of the National Hockey League played the 2026 NHL Stadium Series at Raymond James Stadium, one of the first outdoor NHL games in Florida. The Lightning rallied from a 5–1 deficit to beat the Bruins 6–5 in a shootout in front of 64,617 fans.

=== Baseball ===
On March 15, 2025, the Savannah Bananas exhibition baseball team hosted a game at Raymond James Stadium that drew a sellout crowd of 65,000 spectators. The game was won by the Bananas, 10–11, in the fourth round of the showdown tiebreaker.

=== Professional wrestling ===
WWE planned to host WrestleMania 36—the 2020 edition of its flagship professional wrestling pay-per-view—at Raymond James Stadium on April 5. However, due to the COVID-19 pandemic, WWE subsequently filmed it at its training facility in Orlando instead, behind closed doors with no audience and only essential staff present. In January 2021, WWE announced that WrestleMania 37 (which was originally announced as being hosted by SoFi Stadium in Inglewood, California) would be hosted by Raymond James Stadium on April 10 and 11, 2021. The event had a reported attendance of 25,675 each night, a combined total of 51,350 spectators on both nights, a sellout reported by the company. The show marked the first time in over a year the company had hosted a show with fans in live attendance, since March 11, 2020.

=== Concerts ===
Raymond James Stadium regularly hosts large scale concerts by a wide range of major musical acts, some of which have returned more than once. Beyoncé performed two times at the stadium, first in 2016 as part of her The Formation World Tour, and secondly in 2023 as part of her Renaissance World Tour. Taylor Swift's The Eras Tour is the first act in stadium history to sell out two and three shows on a single tour. The venue can be set up in various configurations which results in a wide range of seating capacities, with the largest concerts drawing over 70,000 spectators. In addition to concerts inside the stadium, several music festivals have been held in the large parking lot. In June 2026, rapper Ye (fka Kanye West), performed two concerts at the stadium.

== See also ==
- List of NCAA Division I FBS football stadiums
- Lists of stadiums

Events and tenants
Preceded by Tampa Stadium/Houlihan's Stadium	Home of the Tampa Bay Buccaneers; 1998 – present	Succeeded by current
Preceded by University of Phoenix Stadium	Home of the College Football Playoff National Championship; 2017	Succeeded by Mercedes-Benz Stadium
Preceded by Jacksonville Municipal Stadium	Host of the ACC Championship Game; 2008–2009	Succeeded by Bank of America Stadium
Preceded by Tampa Stadium/Houlihan's Stadium	Home of the Tampa Bay Mutiny; 1999–2001	Succeeded by last stadium
Preceded by Georgia Dome; University of Phoenix Stadium; Hard Rock Stadium	Host of the Super Bowl; XXXV 2001; XLIII 2009; LV 2021	Succeeded by Louisiana Superdome; Sun Life Stadium; SoFi Stadium
Preceded by first stadium	Home of the Tampa Bay Vipers; 2020	Succeeded by Cashman Field
Preceded by WWE Performance Center	Host of WrestleMania; 2021 (37)	Succeeded by AT&T Stadium
