= Kevin Thompson (American football) =

American football player (born 1977)

No. 16
- Position: Quarterback

Personal information
- Born: July 27, 1977 (age 49); Gaithersburg, Maryland, U.S.
- Listed height: 6 ft 6 in (1.98 m)
- Listed weight: 236 lb (107 kg)

Career information
- High school: Damascus (Damascus, Maryland)
- College: Penn State
- NFL draft: 2000: undrafted

Career history
- Cleveland Browns (2000–2001); Frankfurt Galaxy (2001); Cincinnati Bengals (2001)*; Cleveland Browns (2002); Minnesota Vikings (2003)*; New York Giants (2004)*; Buffalo Bills (2005)*; Cologne Centurions (2005); Los Angeles Avengers (2006–2007)
- * Offseason or practice squad member only

Career NFL statistics
- Passing attempts: 1
- Passing completions: 1
- Passing yards: 8
- Stats at Pro Football Reference

Kevin James Thompson (born July 27, 1977) is an American former professional football player who was a quarterback in the National Football League (NFL), NFL Europe, and the Arena Football League (AFL). He was a two-year starter playing college football for the Penn State Nittany Lions. He signed as a free agent with the Cleveland Browns following the 2000 NFL draft and played there for one season.

== Early life ==
Thompson played basketball and football at Damascus High School in Damascus, Maryland. He recorded more than 4,000 passing yards during his career there and helped lead the football team to win a Maryland state championship in 1993.

== College career ==
Thompson was a two-year starter at Penn State University. He passed for six touchdowns as a junior in 1998 and led the Nittany Lions to a win over Kentucky in the Outback Bowl, in which he threw for 187 yards and a touchdown. As a senior, Thompson was a team captain and threw 13 touchdown passes and averaged 159.7 passing yards-per-game. He did not play in the Nittany Lions' 24-0 shutout of Texas A&M in the 1999 Alamo Bowl due to a shoulder injury sustained earlier in the week.

== Professional football ==
=== National Football League ===
Thompson went unselected in the 2000 NFL draft. Later he signed with the Cleveland Browns. Following training camp, he earned a roster spot as a backup to quarterback Tim Couch. He played in the Browns' Week 14 loss to the Jacksonville Jaguars, but a December 2000 ankle injury ended his season, and he was placed on injured reserve.

The following spring the Browns allocated Thompson to NFL Europe, where he played for the Frankfurt Galaxy. He returned to the team for the 2001 training camp, but a knee injury sustained during camp required arthroscopic surgery forced him to spend the season on injured reserve. On December 18, 2001, he was signed to the Cincinnati Bengals' practice squad for the last three weeks of the regular season.

In January 2003, Thompson had rejoined the Browns and was listed as the Browns' third quarterback for the AFC Wild-Card game due to an injury to Couch. When he was not given a tender offer by the Browns the following spring, he signed a one-year contract with the Minnesota Vikings on March 31, only to be released during training camp.

Thompson spent the 2004 preseason with the New York Giants, and in February 2005 signed with the Buffalo Bills who then allocated him to the Cologne Centurions of NFL Europe. In his April 2, 2005, debut with the Centurions, he made 16-of-25 passes for 197 yards, two touchdowns and no interceptions against the Hamburg Sea Devils. He finished the season with 1,561 yards passing and 10 touchdowns. He then returned to the Bills for their 2005 training camp, but was waived on September 3.

=== Arena Football League ===
Thompson signed with the Los Angeles Avengers of the Arena Football League on March 2, 2006, and spent two seasons with the team.

== Personal ==
He graduated from Penn State in 1999 with a Bachelor of Science in Kinesiology.
