= Floyd Wedderburn =

Jamaican gridiron football player (born 1976)

No. 69
- Position: Guard

Personal information
- Born: May 5, 1976 (age 50); Kingston, Jamaica
- Listed height: 6 ft 7 in (2.01 m)
- Listed weight: 325 lb (147 kg)

Career information
- High school: Upper Darby (PA)
- College: Penn State
- NFL draft: 1999: 5th round, 140th overall pick

Career history
- Seattle Seahawks (1999–2002)

Awards and highlights
- First-team All-Big Ten (1998)

Career NFL statistics
- Games played: 46
- Games started: 26
- Stats at Pro Football Reference

Floyd E. Wedderburn (born May 5, 1976) is a former professional American football player who played guard for three seasons for the Seattle Seahawks.

Wedderburn attended Upper Darby High School, where he lettered in football, basketball, and track and field (shot put and discus). He went on to play football for Joe Paterno at Penn State University. He was selected 140th overall in the fifth round of the 1999 NFL draft.
