= Courtney Brown (defensive end) =

American football player (born 1978)

No. 92, 98
- Position: Defensive end

Personal information
- Born: February 14, 1978 (age 48); Charleston, South Carolina, U.S.
- Listed height: 6 ft 5 in (1.96 m)
- Listed weight: 285 lb (129 kg)

Career information
- High school: Macedonia (Alvin, South Carolina)
- College: Penn State (1996–1999)
- NFL draft: 2000: 1st round, 1st overall pick

Career history
- Cleveland Browns (2000–2004); Denver Broncos (2005)

Awards and highlights
- PFWA All-Rookie Team (2000); Unanimous All-American (1999); Big Ten Defensive Player of the Year (1999); Big Ten Defensive Lineman of the Year (1999); 2× First-team All-Big Ten (1998, 1999); Second-team All-Big Ten (1997)

Career NFL statistics
- Tackles: 196
- Sacks: 19
- Forced fumbles: 6
- Fumble recoveries: 8
- Pass deflections: 23
- Defensive touchdowns: 1
- Stats at Pro Football Reference

Courtney Lanair Brown (born February 14, 1978) is an American former professional football defensive end who played in the National Football League (NFL) for six seasons, primarily with the Cleveland Browns. He played college football for the Penn State Nittany Lions, earning unanimous All-American honors and winning Big Ten Defensive Player of the Year in 1999. Brown was selected by Cleveland first overall in the 2000 NFL draft, but his tenure was marked by injuries, leading to his release after five seasons. He spent his final season with the Denver Broncos.

== Early life ==
Brown was born in Charleston, South Carolina. Growing up in Alvin, South Carolina, he attended Macedonia High School and was a high school All-American linebacker his senior year. He also contributed on offense by playing tight end. Brown earned Gatorade Player-of-the-Year accolades in his senior year. He played in the Shrine Bowl. Brown was also an accomplished basketball star, playing in the North/South All-Star game. Throughout his high school career, he maintained a 4.0 grade point average. Furthermore, he never missed a day of school from K-12.

== College career ==
Brown attended Pennsylvania State University, where he played for coach Joe Paterno's Penn State Nittany Lions football team from 1996 to 1999. At Penn State, he was teammates with LaVar Arrington and Brandon Short. As senior in 1999, he was a first-team All-Big Ten selection, and was recognized as a consensus first-team All-American. Brown earned the Big Ten Defensive Player of the Year and Defensive Linemen of the Year honors in his senior year. He was also a finalist for three national awards: Bronko Nagurski Trophy, Chuck Bednarik Award and Lombardi Award. He finished his college football career with an NCAA record-breaking 33 quarterback sacks and 70 tackles for a loss.

He graduated from Penn State with a Bachelor of Arts degree in integrative arts in 2000.

== Professional career ==
=== Pre-draft ===
Pre-draft measurables
| Height | Weight | 40-yard dash | Vertical jump | Bench press |
|---|---|---|---|---|
| 6 ft 4 7/8 in (1.95 m) | 269 lb (122 kg) | 4.52 s | 37.0 in (0.94 m) | 26 reps |
All values from the NFL Combine/Penn State Pro Day

=== Cleveland Browns ===
Brown was selected by the Browns first overall in the 2000 NFL draft, making him the eleventh defensive lineman to be taken first overall in the 70-plus year history of the NFL Draft.

Brown had a productive rookie season, recording 69 total tackles and 4.5 sacks. His second season was cut short due to injury, but Brown recorded 4.5 sacks in five games. Brown had problems staying healthy for the rest of his career, and struggled on the field. From 2002 to 2004, Brown only played in 26 games and recorded just nine sacks.

=== Denver Broncos ===
Brown finished his professional football career with the Broncos in 2005. The Broncos that season finished 13–3, and in the playoffs, defeated the defending back-to-back Super Bowl champion New England Patriots, led by fellow 2000 draftee Tom Brady, before losing to the eventual Super Bowl champion Pittsburgh Steelers in the AFC Championship Game.

== NFL career statistics ==
| Year | Team | GP | Cmb | Solo | Ast | Sck | FF | FR | Yds | PD |
|---|---|---|---|---|---|---|---|---|---|---|
| 2000 | CLE | 16 | 69 | 61 | 8 | 4.5 | 0 | 1 | 0 | 0 |
| 2001 | CLE | 5 | 21 | 14 | 7 | 4.5 | 2 | 2 | 25 | 4 |
| 2002 | CLE | 11 | 41 | 30 | 11 | 2.0 | 0 | 2 | 1 | 0 |
| 2003 | CLE | 13 | 37 | 28 | 9 | 6.0 | 4 | 1 | 0 | 4 |
| 2004 | CLE | 2 | 2 | 2 | 0 | 0.0 | 0 | 0 | 0 | 0 |
| 2005 | DEN | 14 | 24 | 20 | 4 | 2.0 | 0 | 2 | 0 | 1 |
| Career | | 61 | 194 | 155 | 39 | 19.0 | 6 | 8 | 26 | 9 |
