= List of nicknamed college football games and plays =

College football games & plays with widely-used nicknames

Several college football games and plays throughout its history have been given names by the media, football fans, and as part of a team's or rivalry's lore as a result of a distinctive play associated with the game, a unique outcome of or circumstance behind the game, the rivalry or undefeated nature of both teams, or for other reasons that make the game notable.

The following is a list of games that have been given names that are widely used or recalled in reference to the game or as part of an American college team's lore. This list does not include games named only after being a bowl game or a playoff game unless they are referred to by a separate nickname.

== Nicknamed games ==
Name	Date	Away team	Score	Home team	Notes
First College Football Game	November 6, 1869	Princeton Tigers	4–6	Rutgers Queensmen	First collegiate soccer match, and the birth of soccer in the United States.
The Birth of Black College Football	December 27, 1892	Biddle football team	4–0	Livingstone football team	First game between two historically black colleges and universities (HBCUs).
Hampden Park Blood Bath	November 24, 1894	Yale Bulldogs	12–4	Harvard Crimson	Notoriously violent Harvard-Yale contest resulting in crippling injuries to four players, causing the contest to be suspended until 1897.
C6H0	October 29, 1921	Centre Praying Colonels	6–0	Harvard Crimson	Named based on a Centre College professor stating that Harvard had been poisoned by the impossible C6H0 chemical formula in reference to the final score, resulting in their upset defeat and the formula name being painted throughout Danville, Kentucky.
The Game That Changed The South	January 1, 1926	Alabama Crimson Tide	20–19	Washington Huskies	The first radio broadcast bowl game and first national championship victory of the Alabama Crimson Tide.
Tall Grass Game	October 6, 1928	Notre Dame Fighting Irish	6–22	Wisconsin Badgers	Played on a football field where the grass had not been mowed in a week, and resulted in a Wisconsin upset dubbed by fans as "The Victory In The Tall Grass".
Game of the Century (1935)	November 30, 1935	SMU Mustangs	20–14	TCU Horned Frogs	Match between two undefeated and untied Southwest Conference teams, with victory necessary to secure the conference championship. The first Texas football game to be broadcast nationwide.
When Punts Rained from the Sky	November 11, 1939	Texas Tech Red Raiders	0–0	Centenary Gentlemen	Game marred by torrential downpour and muddy field conditions that prevented running or passing, forcing both teams to punt the ball 77 times together in hopes of a fumble recovery.
Fifth Down Game (1940)	November 16, 1940	Cornell Big Red	0–3	Dartmouth Indians	Game conceded by Cornell after film confirmed that errors by the game officials had allowed an un-permitted fifth down as the last play of the game.
Game of the Century (1946)	November 9, 1946	Notre Dame Fighting Irish	0–0	Army Cadets	Game played between No. 1 (Army) and No. 2 (Notre Dame) ranked teams, resulting in a defensive battle leading to zero points scored and allowing both teams to finish the season undefeated.
Snow Bowl (1950)	November 25, 1950	Michigan Wolverines	9–3	Ohio State Buckeyes	Big Ten Conference football championship-crucial game impacted by two inches per hour of snowfall and significant wind chill.
Game of the Century (1966)	November 19, 1966	Notre Dame Fighting Irish	10–10	Michigan State Spartans	Considered one of the greatest games in college football history, played between two undefeated teams resulting in a tie, with criticism levied at playcaller Ara Parseghian for running the ball on five of six plays in the last minutes.
Game of the Century (1967)	November 18, 1967	UCLA Bruins	20–21	USC Trojans	Widely regarded as the signature game in the UCLA–USC rivalry, having a 64-yard run by O. J. Simpson for the winning touchdown considered one of the greatest run plays in college football history.
Harvard Beats Yale, 29–29	November 23, 1968	Yale Bulldogs	29–29	Harvard Crimson	Significant Harvard last-moment comeback by scoring 16 points in the final 42 seconds to tie the game.
Game of the Century (1969)	December 6, 1969	Texas Longhorns	15–14	Arkansas Razorbacks	No. 1 Texas visited No. 2 Arkansas, with United States President Richard Nixon attending to award a presidential plaque to the winner. Highest Nielsen TV rating in American football history at 52.1 (a 74 share), college or professional.
Game of the Century (1971)	November 25, 1971	Nebraska Cornhuskers	35–31	Oklahoma Sooners	Match between undefeated teams, helping to give the winning Nebraska program a national following.
Punt Bama Punt	December 2, 1972	Auburn Tigers	17–16	Alabama Crimson Tide	Iron Bowl game where Auburn blocked two Alabama punts and ran them back for touchdowns to win the game.
The Vote for the Roses	November 24, 1973	Ohio State Buckeyes	10–10	Michigan Wolverines	One of the most controversial games in NCAA history, due to game's tie outcome resulting in Ohio State being voted into the Rose Bowl instead of Michigan.
The Toilet Bowl	November 19, 1983	Oregon State Beavers	0–0	Oregon Ducks	Notorious poorly played game with eleven turnovers and four missed field goals, and presently the last Division I 0–0 final score.
Earthquake Game	October 8, 1988	Auburn Tigers	6–7	LSU Tigers	Game where an important play triggered a crowd reaction that registered on a seismograph.
Catholics vs. Convicts	October 15, 1988	Miami Hurricanes	30–31	Notre Dame Fighting Irish	Match between two undefeated teams involving Notre Dame's Catholic image and Miami's perceived flamboyance and player arrests.
Fifth Down Game (1990)	October 6, 1990	Colorado Buffaloes	33–31	Missouri Tigers	Game involving an officiating error that allowed the Colorado Buffaloes to score a touchdown at the end of the game and claim the 1990 Division I-A 1990 national championship.
Game of the Century (1993)	November 13, 1993	Florida State Seminoles	24–31	Notre Dame Fighting Irish	Matchup between two unbeaten teams.
Band Brawl	September 19, 1998	Southern Jaguars	37–7	Prairie View A&M Panthers	Named after a halftime brawl between the marching bands of the two schools, resulting in several injuries and suspensions on both bands for two games.
Clemson–South Carolina football brawl	November 20, 2004	South Carolina Gamecocks	7–29	Clemson Tigers	Extensive and violent brawl between both teams, resulting in both teams being suspended from participating in any bowl game for the season.
Game of the Century (2006)	November 18, 2006	Michigan Wolverines	39–42	Ohio State Buckeyes	Match between two rival undefeated teams, resulting in Ohio State claiming the Big Ten championship and several players on both teams receiving awards and recognition.
Game of the Century (2009)	December 5, 2009	Florida Gators	13–32	Alabama Crimson Tide	Match between two 12–0 teams, often seen as the beginning of the Alabama dynasty.
Separate But Equal Bowl	January 4, 2010	Boise State Broncos	17–10	TCU Horned Frogs	First game where two teams from the BCS non-AQ (automatic qualifying) conferences, the historic predecessor to today's Group of Six conferences, earned BCS bowl berths in the same season.
Game of the Century (2011)	November 5, 2011	LSU Tigers	9–6	Alabama Crimson Tide	Match between two rival 8–0 teams.
Trouble With the Snap	October 17, 2015	Michigan State Spartans	27–23	Michigan Wolverines	Michigan–Michigan State football rivalry game where Michigan's punter fumbled the snap, resulting in the ball being returned for a touchdown on the last play of the game.
Battle at Bristol	September 10, 2016	Virginia Tech Hokies	24–45	Tennessee Volunteers	Played at Bristol Motor Speedway. Holds the record for the largest single-game attendance of an NCAA football game at 156,990.
Game of the Century (2019)	November 9, 2019	LSU Tigers	46–41	Alabama Crimson Tide	Match between two top-ranked teams, with both teams tied for first place in the Southeastern Conference's West Division entering the game.

== Named individual plays, series of plays, and in-game instances ==
Name	Date	Away team	Score	Home team	Notes
Billy Cannon's Halloween run	October 31, 1959	Ole Miss Rebels	3–7	LSU Tigers	An 89-yard punt return by Billy Cannon resulting in the game's only touchdown.
The Gator Flop	November 27, 1971	Florida Gators	45–16	Miami Hurricanes	A play where nearly the entire Florida defense fell to the ground to allow Miami to score, giving Florida QB John Reaves the ball back so he could beat Jim Plunkett's NCAA record for all-time passing yardage.
The Kick	September 24, 1977	Oklahoma Sooners	29–28	Ohio State Buckeyes	Oklahoma kicker Uwe von Schamann's last-second 41-yard field goal to win the game.
The Play	November 20, 1982	Stanford Cardinal	20–25	California Golden Bears	Five lateral passes during a kickoff return allowing the Golden Bears to score a controversial last-moment game-winning touchdown while the Stanford Band had already entered the field.
Hail Flutie	November 23, 1984	Boston College Eagles	47–45	Miami Hurricanes	A last-second Hail Mary pass from quarterback Doug Flutie to wide receiver Gerard Phelan to give Boston College the win.
Wide Right I	November 16, 1991	Miami Hurricanes	17–16	Florida State Seminoles	Named after a missed 34-yard potential game-winning field goal "wide to the right."
Wide Right II	October 3, 1992	Florida State Seminoles	16–19	Miami Hurricanes	Similarly named after a missed potentially game changing field goal to the right.
Miracle at Michigan	September 24, 1994	Colorado Buffaloes	27–26	Michigan Wolverines	Colorado quarterback Kordell Stewart's 64-yard Hail Mary pass to Michael Westbrook to win the game in the final play of the game.
Flea Kicker	November 8, 1997	Nebraska Cornhuskers	45–38	Missouri Tigers	A last-seconds play involving the ball being kicked up twice to allow Nebraska to score a game tying touchdown, with overtime ending in their victory.
Black 41 Flash Reverse	October 27, 2001	Oklahoma Sooners	10–20	Nebraska Cornhuskers	Significant play with Nebraska quarterback Eric Crouch receiving the ball to run untouched to the end zone for a 63-yard touchdown, helping Crouch win the Heisman trophy.
Miracle on the Mountain	October 12, 2002	Furman Paladins	15–16	Appalachian State Mountaineers	A failed two-point conversion attempt culminating in Furman's loss.
Bluegrass Miracle	November 9, 2002	LSU Tigers	33–30	Kentucky Wildcats	74-yard game-winning touchdown pass with no time left on the clock after the ball was tipped by a Kentucky defender and then caught by Devery Henderson to run the ball into the endzone.
Holy Buckeye	November 9, 2002	Ohio State Buckeyes	10–6	Purdue Boilermakers	Named after Brent Musburger's exclamation as Ohio State quarterback Craig Krenzel threw a 37-yard pass down the left sideline caught by Michael Jenkins in the endzone to score the game-winning touchdown.
The Mississippi Miracle / Lateralpalooza	October 27, 2007	Trinity Tigers	28–24	Millsaps Majors	A game-winning 61-yard touchdown involving 15 laterals considered to be "the longest play in college football history".
Prayer at Jordan-Hare	November 16, 2013	Georgia Bulldogs	38–43	Auburn Tigers	Game-winning 73-yard Hail Mary pass tipped by a Georgia defender before being caught for the touchdown.
Kick Six	November 30, 2013	Alabama Crimson Tide	28–34	Auburn Tigers	A short 57-yard field goal attempt caught by opposing Auburn's Chris Davis to run the entire field into the end zone to win the 78th Iron Bowl.
Miracle on Techwood Drive	October 24, 2015	Florida State Seminoles	16–22	Georgia Tech Yellow Jackets	A blocked final field goal attempt that was returned for a touchdown by Georgia Tech's Lance Austin, resulting in an upset victory.
Block Six	October 22, 2016	Ohio State Buckeyes	21–24	Penn State Nittany Lions	A blocked field goal resulting in a 70-yard return touchdown, regarded as the best play in Penn State football history in the wake of the Jerry Sandusky scandal.
Music City Miracle II	September 19, 2026	NC State Wolfpack	31–35	Vanderbilt Commodores	With six seconds remaining in the game, NC State led Vanderbilt 31–28 and needed to take a safety to win. However, NC State quarterback CJ Bailey fumbled the ball in the end zone, and Vanderbilt recovered for a touchdown to win the game.

== See also ==
- Walk-off touchdown
- Game of the Century
- History of American football
- List of nicknamed NFL games and plays
