= 1998 Southern vs. Prairie View A&M football game =

1998 Southern vs. Prairie View A&M football game "Band Brawl"
| Southern Jaguars | Prairie View A&M Panthers |
| (1–1) | (0–2) |
| 37 | 7 |
| Head coach: Pete Richardson | Head coach: Greg Johnson |
| | 1 | 2 | 3 | 4 | Total |
|---|---|---|---|---|---|
| Southern | 0 | 10 | 0 | 27 | 37 |
| Prairie View A&M | 0 | 0 | 0 | 7 | 7 |
- Date: September 19, 1998
- Season: 1998
- Stadium: Cardinal Stadium
- Location: Beaumont, Texas

The 1998 Southern vs. Prairie View A&M was a college football game that took place between the Prairie View A&M Panthers and the Southern Jaguars on September 19, 1998, in Beaumont, Texas, United States. The game was the final loss of 80 straight losses for the Prairie View program, but the game is infamous for a halftime brawl between the marching bands of the two schools.

The game was played at the "neutral-ground" Cardinal Stadium on the campus of Lamar University in Beaumont, Texas. Southern won the game 37–7.

There were 17,389 recorded in attendance for the game. At halftime, Southern held a 10–0 lead and continued to hold the lead through the remainder of the game.

The following weekend on September 26, Prairie View would end its NCAA all-division record 80-game losing streak by defeating Langston University 14–12 in Oklahoma City.

== Legacy ==
The Southwestern Athletic Conference suspended both marching bands for the next two games because "...the bands' actions violate provisions of the SWAC Constitution and Bylaws governing unsportsmanlike conduct at athletic events." Seven Prairie View band members reported injuries.

Complicating matters, the Southern band honored the suspension, but Prairie View's band did not.

== See also ==
- List of historically significant college football games
- List of nicknamed college football games and plays
