= Lee Hardman =

Playing career
- 1968–1971: Arkansas AM&N
- Position: Defensive back

Coaching career (HC unless noted)
- 1982–1992: Dollarway HS (AR)
- 1993–2003: Arkansas–Pine Bluff
- 2016–2017: Dollarway HS (AR)

Administrative career (AD unless noted)
- 2013–2017: Dollarway HS (AR)

Head coaching record
- Overall: 64–57 (college); 117–38–1 (high school)
- Tournaments: 2–2 (NAIA D-I playoffs)

Lee Hardman is an American former football coach. He served as the head football coach at the University of Arkansas at Pine Bluff from 1993 to 2003, compiling a record of 64–57.

== Head coaching record ==
=== College ===
Year	Team	Overall	Conference	Standing	Bowl/playoffs
Arkansas–Pine Bluff Golden Lions (NAIA Division I independent) (1993–1996)
1993	Arkansas–Pine Bluff	5–6			
1994	Arkansas–Pine Bluff	9–4			L NAIA Division I Championship
1995	Arkansas–Pine Bluff	6–4			L NAIA Division I Semifinal
1996	Arkansas–Pine Bluff	5–5			
Arkansas–Pine Bluff Golden Lions (Southwestern Athletic Conference) (1997–2003)
1997	Arkansas–Pine Bluff	8–3	6–2	3rd	
1998	Arkansas–Pine Bluff	8–3	6–2	3rd	
1999	Arkansas–Pine Bluff	6–5	1–3	4th (West)	
2000	Arkansas–Pine Bluff	6–5	4–3	T–3rd (West)	
2001	Arkansas–Pine Bluff	4–7	1–6	5th (West)	
2002	Arkansas–Pine Bluff	3–8	2–5	4th (West)	
2003	Arkansas–Pine Bluff	4–7	3–4	T–3rd (West)	
Arkansas–Pine Bluff:		64–57	23–25		
Total:		64–57			

=== High school ===
Year	Team	Overall	Conference	Standing	Bowl/playoffs
Dollarway Cardinals () (1982–1992)
1982	Dollarway	6–4	3–1		
1983	Dollarway	7–3	3–1	1st	
1984	Dollarway	8–3	4–0	1st	
1985	Dollarway	11–3	4–1	1st	
1986	Dollarway	5–4–1	3–2		
1987	Dollarway	12–1	5–0	1st	
1988	Dollarway	12–2	5–0	1st	
1989	Dollarway	14–0	5–0	1st	
1990	Dollarway	14–0	5–0	1st	
1991	Dollarway	13–1	7–0	1st	
1992	Dollarway	14–0	7–0	1st	
Dollarway Cardinals () (2016–2017)
2016	Dollarway	1–8	1–6	7th	
2017	Dollarway	0–9	0–7	8th	
Dollarway:		117–38–1	52–18		
Total:		117–38–1			
