= 1998 Alabama State Hornets football team =

American college football season

1998 Alabama State Hornets football
- Conference: Southwestern Athletic Conference
- Record: 5–6 (3–5 SWAC)
- Head coach: Ron Dickerson (1st season)
- Home stadium: Cramton Bowl

1998 Southwestern Athletic Conference football standings
	Conf.			Overall
Team	W		L	W		L
No. 14 Southern $	8	–	0	9	–	3
Jackson State	7	–	1	7	–	4
Arkansas–Pine Bluff	6	–	2	8	–	3
Texas Southern	4	–	4	6	–	5
Grambling State	4	–	4	5	–	6
Alabama State	3	–	5	5	–	6
Alcorn State	3	–	5	5	–	6
Mississippi Valley State	1	–	7	1	–	10
Prairie View A&M	0	–	8	1	–	10
Alabama A&M	0	–	0	5	–	6
$ – Conference champion; Alabama A&M was transitioning from Division II and did not play a full SWAC schedule, so its games did not count in the official standings.; Rankings from The Sports Network Poll

The 1998 Alabama State Hornets football team represented Alabama State University as a member of the Southwestern Athletic Conference (SWAC) during the 1998 NCAA Division I-AA football season. Led by first-year head coach Ron Dickerson, the Hornets compiled an overall record of 5–6, with a mark of 3–5 in conference play, and finished tied for sixth in the SWAC.

== Schedule ==
Date	Opponent	Site	Result	Attendance	Source
September 5	at No. 25 Troy State*	Veterans Memorial Stadium; Troy, AL	L 0–26	18,845	
September 12	Texas Southern	Cramton Bowl; Montgomery, AL	L 6–31		
September 19	at Alcorn State	Jack Spinks Stadium; Lorman, MS	W 41–21		
September 26	at No. 15 Southern	A. W. Mumford Stadium; Baton Rouge, LA	L 27–34	21,808	
October 3	Arkansas–Pine Bluff	Cramton Bowl; Montgomery, AL	L 14–28	8,437	
October 10	vs. Jackson State	Ladd–Peebles Stadium; Mobile, AL (Gulf Coast Classic)	L 35–41	11,000	
October 17	at Prairie View A&M	Edward L. Blackshear Field; Prairie View, TX	W 30–20		
October 31	vs. Alabama A&M*	Legion Field; Birmingham, AL (Magic City Classic)	W 34–28 ^{OT}	58,437	
November 7	at Grambling State	Eddie G. Robinson Memorial Stadium; Grambling, LA	L 6–31	6,221	
November 14	Mississippi Valley State	Cramton Bowl; Montgomery, AL	W 41–13		
November 26	Tuskegee*	Cramton Bowl; Montgomery, AL (Turkey Day Classic)	W 27–7		
*Non-conference game; Rankings from The Sports Network Poll released prior to the game
