= Greg Johnson (American football coach) =

American football coach (born c. 1960)

Biographical details
- Born: c. 1960
- Education: Northwestern Oklahoma State

Coaching career (HC unless noted)
- 1983: Oklahoma Panhandle State (assistant)
- 1984–1985: Tennessee Tech (assistant)
- 1986–1990: Langston (assistant)
- 1991–1996: Langston
- 1997–1998: Prairie View A&M
- 2004–2010: Langston
- 2012: Texas Southern (assoc. HC / co-DC / CB)

Head coaching record
- Overall: 82–76
- Tournaments: 1–2 (NAIA D–I playoffs); 1–2 (NAIA playoffs)

Accomplishments and honors

Championships
- 2 OIC (1993, 1994); 3 CSFL (2005, 2007–2008)

Greg Johnson (born c. 1960) is an American former football coach. He served as the head football coach at Langston University from 1991 to 1996 at and Prairie View A&M University from 1997 to 1998, compiling a career college record of 36–49.

On January 31, 2012 it was announced that Johnson has been hired by Texas Southern to be the associate head coach, co-defensive coordinator, and cornerbacks coach.

== Coaching career ==
Johnson was the 19th head football coach at Prairie View A&M University in Prairie View, Texas and he held that position for two seasons, from 1997 until 1998. His record at Prairie View was 1–19.

Johnson lost the first 12 games of his career—part of an 80-game losing streak over parts of 10 seasons, the longest in NCAA history. However, it was in the fourth game of his second season as head coach when the streak was broken by a 14–12 victory over Langston. Tensions over the losing streak had grown so high at the school that the entire marching band was suspended by the conference the week before as a result of fighting between marching bands.

== Head coaching record ==
Year	Team	Overall	Conference	Standing	Bowl/playoffs
Langston Lions (Oklahoma Intercollegiate Conference) (1991–1996)
1991	Langston	2–8	0–5	6th	
1992	Langston	4–6	0–5	6th	
1993	Langston	9–3	4–1	1st	L NAIA Division I First Round
1994	Langston	10–3	4–1	T–1st	L NAIA Division I Semifinal
1995	Langston	4–6	2–3	T–4th	
1996	Langston	6–4	3–2	T–3rd	
Langston:		35–30	13–17		
Prairie View A&M Panthers (Southwestern Athletic Conference) (1997–1998)
1997	Prairie View A&M	0–9	0–8	9th	
1998	Prairie View A&M	1–10	0–8	9th	
Prairie View A&M:		1–19	0–16		
Langston Lions (Central States Football League) (2004–2005)
2004	Langston	6–5	3–3	4th	
2005	Langston	7–3	5–1	T–1st	
Langston Lions (NAIA independent) (2006)
2006	Langston	5–4			
Langston Lions (Central States Football League) (2007–2010)
2007	Langston	5–4	4–1	1st	
2008	Langston	10–3	5–0	1st	L NAIA Quarterfinal
2009	Langston	7–4	5–1	2nd	L NAIA First Round
2010	Langston	6–4	4–2		
Langston:		46–27	26–8		
Total:		82–76			
National championship Conference title Conference division title or championship game berth
