= 1998 Texas Southern Tigers football team =

American college football season

1998 Texas Southern Tigers football
- Conference: Southwestern Athletic Conference
- Record: 6–5 (4–4 SWAC)
- Head coach: William A. Thomas (5th season)
- Home stadium: Astrodome; Rice Stadium

1998 Southwestern Athletic Conference football standings
	Conf.			Overall
Team	W		L	W		L
No. 14 Southern $	8	–	0	9	–	3
Jackson State	7	–	1	7	–	4
Arkansas–Pine Bluff	6	–	2	8	–	3
Texas Southern	4	–	4	6	–	5
Grambling State	4	–	4	5	–	6
Alabama State	3	–	5	5	–	6
Alcorn State	3	–	5	5	–	6
Mississippi Valley State	1	–	7	1	–	10
Prairie View A&M	0	–	8	1	–	10
Alabama A&M	0	–	0	5	–	6
$ – Conference champion; Alabama A&M was transitioning from Division II and did not play a full SWAC schedule, so its games did not count in the official standings.; Rankings from The Sports Network Poll

The 1998 Texas Southern Tigers football team represented Texas Southern University as a member of the Southwestern Athletic Conference (SWAC) during the 1998 NCAA Division I-AA football season. Led by fifth-year head coach William A. Thomas, the Tigers compiled an overall record of 6–5, with a mark of 4–4 in conference play, and finished tied for fourth in the SWAC.

== Schedule ==
Date	Opponent	Site	Result	Source
September 5	Prairie View A&M	Astrodome; Houston, TX (Labor Day Classic)	W 24–13	
September 12	at Alabama State	Cramton Bowl; Montgomery, AL	W 31–6	
September 19	vs. Langston*	Skelly Stadium; Tulsa, OK (Greenwood Midwest Heritage Football Classic)	W 17–24	
September 26	Howard*	Rice Stadium; Houston, TX	W 30–7	
October 3	at Jackson State	Mississippi Veterans Memorial Stadium; Jackson, MS	L 32–57	
October 10	Arkansas–Pine Bluff	Rice Stadium; Houston, TX	L 22–29	
October 17	at Alcorn State	Jack Spinks Stadium; Lorman, MS	L 14–21	
October 24	Mississippi Valley State	Rice Stadium; Houston, TX	W 38–19	
October 31	Grambling State	Astrodome; Houston, TX	W 41–24	
November 14	at No. 17 Southern	A. W. Mumford Stadium; Baton Rouge, LA	L 14–20	
November 21	at No. 11 Tennessee State*	Hale Stadium; Nashville, TN	L 14–28	
*Non-conference game; Rankings from The Sports Network Poll released prior to the game
