= 1998 Alabama A&M Bulldogs football team =

American college football season

1998 Alabama A&M Bulldogs football
- Conference: Southwestern Athletic Conference
- Record: 5–6 (0–0 SWAC)
- Head coach: Ron Cooper (1st season)
- Defensive coordinator: Sal Sunseri (1st season)
- Home stadium: Louis Crews Stadium

1998 Southwestern Athletic Conference football standings
| | Conf. | | | Overall |
| Team | W | | L | W | | L |
|---|---|---|---|---|---|---|
| No. 14 Southern $ | 8 | – | 0 | 9 | – | 3 |
| Jackson State | 7 | – | 1 | 7 | – | 4 |
| Arkansas–Pine Bluff | 6 | – | 2 | 8 | – | 3 |
| Texas Southern | 4 | – | 4 | 6 | – | 5 |
| Grambling State | 4 | – | 4 | 5 | – | 6 |
| Alabama State | 3 | – | 5 | 5 | – | 6 |
| Alcorn State | 3 | – | 5 | 5 | – | 6 |
| Mississippi Valley State | 1 | – | 7 | 1 | – | 10 |
| Prairie View A&M | 0 | – | 8 | 1 | – | 10 |
| Alabama A&M | 0 | – | 0 | 5 | – | 6 |
$ – Conference champion; Alabama A&M was transitioning from Division II and did not play a full SWAC schedule, so its games did not count in the official standings.; Rankings from The Sports Network Poll

The 1998 Alabama A&M Bulldogs football team represented Alabama A&M University as a member of the Southwestern Athletic Conference (SWAC) during the 1998 NCAA Division I-AA football season. Led by first-year head coach Ron Cooper, the Bulldogs compiled an overall record of 5–6.

== Schedule ==
| Date | Opponent | Site | Result | Attendance | Source |
|---|---|---|---|---|---|
| September 5 | Jacksonville State* | Louis Crews Stadium; Normal, AL | L 13–19 | 14,673 | |
| September 12 | Grambling State* | Louis Crews Stadium; Normal, AL | W 14–13 ^{OT} | | |
| September 19 | Mississippi Valley State* | Louis Crews Stadium; Normal, AL | W 20–12 | | |
| September 26 | at Morris Brown* | Herndon Stadium; Atlanta, GA | W 16–7 | 4,230 | |
| October 3 | at Tennessee State* | Hale Stadium; Nashville, TN | L 24–59 | 13,111 | |
| October 10 | No. 15 Southern* | Louis Crews Stadium; Normal, AL | W 33–27 | | |
| October 17 | at Tuskegee* | Abbott Memorial Alumni Stadium; Tuskegee, AL | L 7–14 | 12,259 | |
| October 24 | Miles* | Louis Crews Stadium; Normal, AL | L 20–24 | | |
| October 31 | vs. Alabama State* | Legion Field; Birmingham, AL (Magic City Classic) | L 28–34 ^{OT} | 58,437 | |
| November 14 | Alcorn State* | Louis Crews Stadium; Normal, AL | W 21–12 | | |
| November 21 | at Arkansas–Pine Bluff* | Pumphrey Stadium; Pine Bluff, AR | L 24–27 | | |
*Non-conference game; Rankings from The Sports Network Poll released prior to the game
