= Johnny Thomas (American football, born 1956) =

American football player and coach (born 1956)

Biographical details
- Born: October 19, 1956 (age 70); Bay Springs, Mississippi, U.S.

Playing career
- 1974–1977: Alcorn State

Coaching career (HC unless noted)
- 1980–1981: Mississippi Valley State (LB/DE)
- 1982–1985: Mississippi Valley State (ST/RC)
- 1986: Alabama State (ST/RC)
- 1987–1997: Arkansas–Pine Bluff (AHC/ST/RC)
- 1998–2007: Alcorn State

Head coaching record
- Overall: 48–61

Accomplishments and honors

Championships
- 1 SWAC East Division (2003)

John D. Thomas (born October 19, 1956) is an American former football player and coach. He served as the head football coach at Alcorn State University from 1998 to 2007, compiling a record of 48–61. He is the brother of College Football Hall of Fame inductee Dennis Thomas.

== Head coaching record ==
Year	Team	Overall	Conference	Standing	Bowl/playoffs
Alcorn State Braves (Southwestern Athletic Conference) (1998–2007)
1998	Alcorn State	5–6	3–5	T–6th	
1999	Alcorn State	3–7	1–3	T–3rd (East)	
2000	Alcorn State	0–11	0–7	5th (East)	
2001	Alcorn State	6–5	5–2	T–2nd (East)	
2002	Alcorn State	6–5	3–4	T–3rd (East)	
2003	Alcorn State	7–5	5–2	T–1st (East)	
2004	Alcorn State	7–4	4–3	3rd (East)	
2005	Alcorn State	6–5	5–4	T–3rd (East)	
2006	Alcorn State	6–5	5–4	T–2nd (East)	
2007	Alcorn State	2–8	2–7	T–4th (East)	
Alcorn State:		48–61	33–41		
Total:		48–61			
National championship Conference title Conference division title or championship game berth
