= 1998 Arkansas–Pine Bluff Golden Lions football team =

American college football season

1998 Arkansas–Pine Bluff Golden Lions football
- Conference: Southwestern Athletic Conference
- Record: 8–3 (6–2 SWAC)
- Head coach: Lee Hardman (6th season)
- Home stadium: Pumphrey Stadium; War Memorial Stadium

1998 Southwestern Athletic Conference football standings
| | Conf. | | | Overall |
| Team | W | | L | W | | L |
|---|---|---|---|---|---|---|
| No. 14 Southern $ | 8 | – | 0 | 9 | – | 3 |
| Jackson State | 7 | – | 1 | 7 | – | 4 |
| Arkansas–Pine Bluff | 6 | – | 2 | 8 | – | 3 |
| Texas Southern | 4 | – | 4 | 6 | – | 5 |
| Grambling State | 4 | – | 4 | 5 | – | 6 |
| Alabama State | 3 | – | 5 | 5 | – | 6 |
| Alcorn State | 3 | – | 5 | 5 | – | 6 |
| Mississippi Valley State | 1 | – | 7 | 1 | – | 10 |
| Prairie View A&M | 0 | – | 8 | 1 | – | 10 |
| Alabama A&M | 0 | – | 0 | 5 | – | 6 |
$ – Conference champion; Alabama A&M was transitioning from Division II and did not play a full SWAC schedule, so its games did not count in the official standings.; Rankings from The Sports Network Poll

The 1998 Arkansas–Pine Bluff Golden Lions football team represented the University of Arkansas at Pine Bluff as a member of the Southwestern Athletic Conference (SWAC) during the 1998 NCAA Division I-AA football season. Led by sixth-year head coach Lee Hardman, the Golden Lions compiled an overall record of 8–3, with a mark of 6–2 in conference play, and finished third in the SWAC.

== Schedule ==
| Date | Opponent | Site | Result | Attendance | Source |
|---|---|---|---|---|---|
| September 5 | at Mississippi Valley State | Magnolia Stadium; Itta Bena, MS | W 38–21 | | |
| September 12 | No. 21 Southern | War Memorial Stadium; Little Rock, AR | L 14–17 | 18,854 | |
| September 19 | vs. Howard* | Trans World Dome; St. Louis, MO (Gateway Classic) | L 20–21 | 37,420 | |
| September 26 | at Alcorn State | Jack Spinks Stadium; Lorman, MS | W 27–18 | | |
| October 3 | at Alabama State | Cramton Bowl; Montgomery, AL | W 28–14 | 8,437 | |
| October 10 | at Texas Southern | Rice Stadium; Houston, TX | W 29–22 | | |
| October 17 | vs. Grambling State | Independence Stadium; Shreveport, LA (Red River Classic) | W 54–33 | 15,350 | |
| October 24 | at Langston* | Anderson Stadium; Langston, OK | W 24–6 | | |
| October 31 | Jackson State | War Memorial Stadium; Little Rock, AR | L 34–41 | 11,659 | |
| November 7 | Prairie View A&M | Pumphrey Stadium; Pine Bluff, AR | W 30–0 | | |
| November 21 | Alabama A&M | Pumphrey Stadium; Pine Bluff, AR | W 27–24 | | |
*Non-conference game; Rankings from The Sports Network Poll released prior to the game
