= 1998 Mississippi Valley State Delta Devils football team =

American college football season

1998 Mississippi Valley State Delta Devils football
- Conference: Southwestern Athletic Conference
- Record: 1–10 (1–7 SWAC)
- Head coach: Larry Dorsey (9th season)
- Home stadium: Magnolia Stadium

1998 Southwestern Athletic Conference football standings
	Conf.			Overall
Team	W		L	W		L
No. 14 Southern $	8	–	0	9	–	3
Jackson State	7	–	1	7	–	4
Arkansas–Pine Bluff	6	–	2	8	–	3
Texas Southern	4	–	4	6	–	5
Grambling State	4	–	4	5	–	6
Alabama State	3	–	5	5	–	6
Alcorn State	3	–	5	5	–	6
Mississippi Valley State	1	–	7	1	–	10
Prairie View A&M	0	–	8	1	–	10
Alabama A&M	0	–	0	5	–	6
$ – Conference champion; Alabama A&M was transitioning from Division II and did not play a full SWAC schedule, so its games did not count in the official standings.; Rankings from The Sports Network Poll

The 1998 Mississippi Valley State Delta Devils football team represented Mississippi Valley State University as a member of the Southwestern Athletic Conference (SWAC) during the 1998 NCAA Division I-AA football season. Led by ninth-year head coach Larry Dorsey, the Delta Devils compiled an overall record of 1–10, with a conference record of 1–7, and finished eighth in the SWAC.

== Schedule ==
Date	Opponent	Site	Result	Attendance	Source
September 5	Arkansas–Pine Bluff	Magnolia Stadium; Itta Bena, MS	L 21–38		
September 12	vs. Nicholls State*	Tad Gormley Stadium; New Orleans, LA (Gormley Gridiron Classic)	L 26–41		
September 19	at Alabama A&M	Louis Crews Stadium; Normal, AL	L 12–20		
September 26	at Jackson State	Mississippi Veterans Memorial Stadium; Jackson, MS	L 7–45	18,000	
October 3	at No. 15 Southern	A. W. Mumford Stadium; Baton Rouge, LA	L 13–42		
October 10	Grambling State	Magnolia Stadium; Itta Bena, MS	L 13–21	4,244	
October 17	Albany State*	Magnolia Stadium; Itta Bena, MS	L 9–37	6,297	
October 24	at Texas Southern	Rice Stadium; Houston, TX	L 19–38		
October 31	Prairie View A&M	Magnolia Stadium; Itta Bena, MS	W 38–6		
November 7	Alcorn State	Magnolia Stadium; Itta Bena, MS	L 19–22		
November 14	at Alabama State	Cramton Bowl; Montgomery, AL	L 13–41		
*Non-conference game; Rankings from The Sports Network Poll released prior to the game
