= 1998 Grambling State Tigers football team =

American college football season

1998 Grambling State Tigers football
- Conference: Southwestern Athletic Conference
- Record: 5–6 (4–4 SWAC)
- Head coach: Doug Williams (1st season)
- Offensive coordinator: Melvin Spears (1st season)
- Home stadium: Eddie G. Robinson Memorial Stadium

1998 Southwestern Athletic Conference football standings
	Conf.			Overall
Team	W		L	W		L
No. 14 Southern $	8	–	0	9	–	3
Jackson State	7	–	1	7	–	4
Arkansas–Pine Bluff	6	–	2	8	–	3
Texas Southern	4	–	4	6	–	5
Grambling State	4	–	4	5	–	6
Alabama State	3	–	5	5	–	6
Alcorn State	3	–	5	5	–	6
Mississippi Valley State	1	–	7	1	–	10
Prairie View A&M	0	–	8	1	–	10
Alabama A&M	0	–	0	5	–	6
$ – Conference champion; Alabama A&M was transitioning from Division II and did not play a full SWAC schedule, so its games did not count in the official standings.; Rankings from The Sports Network Poll

The 1998 Grambling State Tigers football team represented Grambling State University as a member of the Southwestern Athletic Conference (SWAC) during the 1998 NCAA Division I-AA football season. The Tigers were led by head coach Doug Williams in his first year and finished the season with a record of five wins and six losses (5–6, 4–4 SWAC). The Tigers offense scored 287 points while the defense allowed only 318 points.

== Schedule ==
Date	Opponent	Site	Result	Attendance	Source
September 5	Alcorn State	Eddie G. Robinson Memorial Stadium; Grambling, LA	W 11–0		
September 12	at Alabama A&M	Louis Crews Stadium; Normal, AL	L 13–14 ^{OT}		
September 26	vs. Hampton*	Giants Stadium; East Rutherford, NJ (Whitney Young Memorial Classic)	L 15–28	54,564	
October 3	vs. Prairie View A&M	Cotton Bowl; Dallas, TX (rivalry)	W 55–40	33,549	
October 10	at Mississippi Valley State	Magnolia Stadium; Itta Bena, MS	W 21–13	4,244	
October 17	vs. Arkansas–Pine Bluff	Independence Stadium; Shreveport, LA (Red River Classic)	L 33–54	15,350	
October 24	Jackson State	Eddie G. Robinson Memorial Stadium; Grambling, LA	L 35–68	11,678	
October 31	at Texas Southern	Houston Astrodome; Houston, TX	L 24–41	23,985	
November 7	Alabama State	Eddie G. Robinson Memorial Stadium; Grambling, LA	W 31–6	6,221	
November 14	vs. Winston-Salem State*	Qualcomm Stadium; San Diego, CA (Gold Coast Classic)	W 35–28		
November 28	vs. Southern	Louisiana Superdome; New Orleans, LA (Bayou Classic)	L 14–26	60,986	
*Non-conference game
