= 1998 Alcorn State Braves football team =

American college football season

1998 Alcorn State Braves football
- Conference: Southwestern Athletic Conference
- Record: 5–6 (3–5 SWAC)
- Head coach: Johnny Thomas (1st season)
- Home stadium: Jack Spinks Stadium

1998 Southwestern Athletic Conference football standings
	Conf.			Overall
Team	W		L	W		L
No. 14 Southern $	8	–	0	9	–	3
Jackson State	7	–	1	7	–	4
Arkansas–Pine Bluff	6	–	2	8	–	3
Texas Southern	4	–	4	6	–	5
Grambling State	4	–	4	5	–	6
Alabama State	3	–	5	5	–	6
Alcorn State	3	–	5	5	–	6
Mississippi Valley State	1	–	7	1	–	10
Prairie View A&M	0	–	8	1	–	10
Alabama A&M	0	–	0	5	–	6
$ – Conference champion; Alabama A&M was transitioning from Division II and did not play a full SWAC schedule, so its games did not count in the official standings.; Rankings from The Sports Network Poll

The 1998 Alcorn State Braves football team represented Alcorn State University as a member of the Southwestern Athletic Conference (SWAC) during the 1998 NCAA Division I-AA football season. Led by first-year head coach Johnny Thomas, the Braves compiled an overall record of 3–5, with a conference record of 4–4, and finished tied for sixth in the SWAC.

== Schedule ==
Date	Opponent	Site	Result	Attendance	Source
September 5	at Grambling State	Eddie G. Robinson Memorial Stadium; Grambling, Louisiana	L 0–11		
September 12	vs. Virginia State*	Soldier Field; Chicago, Illinois (Chicago Football Classic)	W 30–24		
September 19	Alabama State	Jack Spinks Stadium; Lorman, Mississippi	L 21–41		
September 26	Arkansas–Pine Bluff	Jack Spinks Stadium; Lorman, Mississippi	L 18–27		
October 3	at Morehouse*	B. T. Harvey Stadium; Atlanta, Georgia	W 27–13	6,500	
October 10	at Prairie View A&M	Edward L. Blackshear Field; Prairie View, Texas	W 45–36		
October 17	Texas Southern	Jack Spinks Stadium; Lorman, Mississippi	W 21–14		
October 24	No. 15 Southern	Jack Spinks Stadium; Lorman, Mississippi	L 28–29	23,000	
November 7	at Mississippi Valley State	Magnolia Stadium; Itta Bena, Mississippi	W 22–19		
November 14	at Alabama A&M	Louis Crews Stadium; Normal, Alabama	L 12–21		
November 21	at Jackson State	Mississippi Veterans Memorial Stadium; Jackson, Mississippi (Capital City Classic)	L 26–56	56,400	
*Non-conference game; Rankings from The Sports Network Poll released prior to the game
