= Ron Cooper (American football) =

American football player and coach (born 1962)

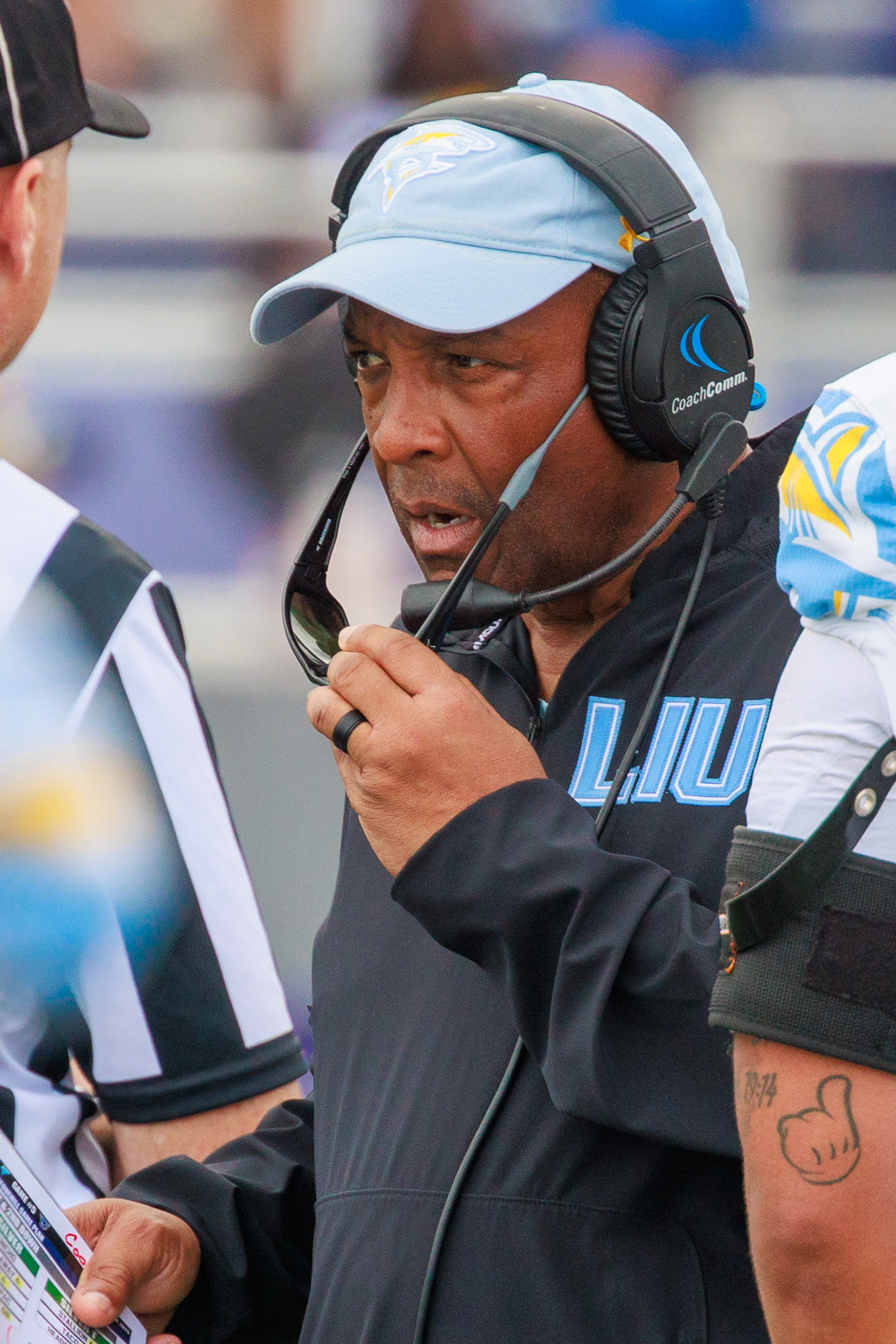
- Cooper in 2025

Current position
- Title: Head coach
- Team: LIU
- Conference: NEC
- Record: 23–35

Biographical details
- Born: February 11, 1962 (age 64); Huntsville, Alabama, U.S.

Playing career
- 1979–1982: Jacksonville State

Coaching career (HC unless noted)
- 1983: Appalachian State (GA)
- 1984: Minnesota (GA)
- 1985–1986: Austin Peay (assistant)
- 1987–1988: Murray State (DC)
- 1989: East Carolina (assistant)
- 1990: UNLV (DC)
- 1991–1992: Notre Dame (assistant)
- 1993–1994: Eastern Michigan
- 1995–1997: Louisville
- 1998–2001: Alabama A&M
- 2002: Wisconsin (DB)
- 2003: Mississippi State (DC)
- 2004: South Carolina (DB)
- 2005: South Carolina (OLB/ST)
- 2006–2007: South Carolina (AHC/DB)
- 2008: South Carolina (S)
- 2009–2011: LSU (DB)
- 2012: Tampa Bay Buccaneers (DB)
- 2013–2014: South Florida (AHC/DB)
- 2015: FIU (DB)
- 2016: FIU (DC/LB)
- 2016: FIU (interim HC)
- 2017: Texas A&M (DB)
- 2018–2019: Arkansas (DB)
- 2021: Alabama (analyst)
- 2022–present: LIU

Head coaching record
- Overall: 72–94

Accomplishments and honors

Championships
- 1 NEC (2026)

Awards
- 1 SWAC Eastern Division (2000)

Ronald Louis Cooper (born February 11, 1962) is an American football coach and former player. He is the head football coach at Long Island University (LIU), a position he has held since the 2022 season. Cooper served as the head football coach at Eastern Michigan University from 1993 to 1994, the University of Louisville from 1995 to 1997, and Alabama A&M University from 1998 to 2001. He was also the interim head football coach at Florida International University (FIU) for the final eight games of the 2016 season. Cooper worked one season in the National Football League, as the defensive backs coach for the Tampa Bay Buccaneers in 2012. A native of Huntsville, Alabama, Cooper played high school football at Lee High School and college football at Jacksonville State University.

== Coaching career ==
=== Eastern Michigan ===
Cooper was the head football coach at Eastern Michigan University in Ypsilanti, Michigan, from 1993 to 1994. At Eastern Michigan, his teams produced a record of 9–13.

=== Louisville ===
From 1995 to 1997 Cooper was the head football coach at the University of Louisville, replacing Howard Schnellenberger. In his final season, the Cardinals posted a 1–10 record. The one win came against Illinois who finished the season with no wins (0–11). Cooper's overall record at Louisville was 13–20. On November 19, 1997, Louisville fired Cooper due to a steady decline in the team's performance.

=== Alabama A&M ===
Cooper's next head coaching position was at Alabama Agricultural and Mechanical University, from 1998 to 2001. His squad won a division championship in Southwest Athletic Conference (SWAC) during the 2000 season but lost the SWAC Championship Game to Grambling on December 12, 2000.

=== Other coaching duties ===
In 2002, Cooper was the secondaries coach at the University of Wisconsin–Madison, and in 2003 the defensive coordinator and safeties coach at Mississippi State. Other coaching stops have included the University of South Carolina and the University of Notre Dame. Cooper is an alumnus of Jacksonville State University.

=== LSU ===
Ron Cooper, coached the LSU Tigers defensive backs for three seasons.

Cooper had been responsible for overseeing perhaps the nation's top secondary in 2011 as the Tigers feature two national award winners in Morris Claiborne (Thorpe Award) and Tyrann Mathieu (Bednarik Award). Claiborne (SEC Coaches) and Mathieu (AP) each picked up SEC Defensive Player of the Year honors in 2011. It was the second straight year that LSU featured the Thorpe and Bednarik Award winners along with the SEC Defensive Player of the Year. Patrick Peterson claimed all three honors in 2010 before being taken with the fifth overall pick in the NFL draft.

As a unit, LSU's secondary accounted for 16 interceptions, nine fumble recoveries and 12 forced fumbles as the Tigers led the nation in turnover margin (+1.69) and ranked fifth in total interceptions with 18. LSU allowed just seven passing touchdowns all season, the fewest by a Tiger team since limiting opponents to only five in 1989.

In his first two years with the Tigers, Cooper's expertise coaching the secondary was evident as LSU had one of the best defensive backfields in the country. LSU led the SEC and ranked 10th in the nation in pass defense allowing 169.8 yards per game.

Cooper's first year at LSU saw Peterson earn second team All-America honors, while safety Chad Jones was picked in the third round of the NFL draft.

=== Tampa Bay Buccaneers ===
Cooper was hired by the Buccaneers on February 22, 2012, to be the team's defensive backs coach.

=== FIU ===
In 2015, Cooper became the defensive coordinator and associate head coach at Florida International University. Following Ron Turner's termination in September 2016, Cooper was named interim head coach.

=== Alabama ===
On March 1, 2021, it was reported that Cooper had taken a job as an analyst with the Crimson Tide.

=== Long Island ===
In January 2022, Cooper was hired as the new head coach of the Long Island Sharks.

== Head coaching record ==
Year	Team	Overall	Conference	Standing	Bowl/playoffs
Eastern Michigan Eagles (Mid-American Conference) (1993–1994)
1993	Eastern Michigan	4–7	3–5	T–7th	
1994	Eastern Michigan	5–6	5–4	7th	
Eastern Michigan:		9–13	8–9		
Louisville Cardinals (NCAA Division I-A independent) (1995)
1995	Louisville	7–4			
Louisville Cardinals (Conference USA) (1996–1997)
1996	Louisville	5–6	2–3	T–3rd	
1997	Louisville	1–10	0–6	7th	
Louisville:		13–20	2–9		
Alabama A&M Bulldogs (NCAA Division I-AA independent) (1998)
1998	Alabama A&M	5–6			
Alabama A&M Bulldogs (Southwestern Athletic Conference) (1999–2001)
1999	Alabama A&M	6–5	3–1	2nd (East)	
2000	Alabama A&M	7–5	5–2	T–1st (East)	
2001	Alabama A&M	5–6	4–3	4th (East)	
Alabama A&M:		23–22	12–6		
FIU Panthers (Conference USA) (2016)
2016	FIU*	4–4	4–4	4th (East)	
FIU:		4–4	4–4	* Interim HC	
LIU Sharks (Northeast Conference) (2022–present)
2022	LIU	4–7	4–3	3rd	
2023	LIU	4–7	4–3	T–2nd	
2024	LIU	4–8	3–3	4th	
2025	LIU	6–6	4–3	T–3rd	
2026	LIU	5–7	5–2	T-1st	NCAA Division I
LIU:		23–35	20–14		
Total:		72–94			
National championship Conference title Conference division title or championship game berth
