= 1998 Prairie View A&M Panthers football team =

American college football season

1998 Prairie View A&M Panthers football
- Conference: Southwestern Athletic Conference
- Record: 1–10 (0–8 SWAC)
- Head coach: Greg Johnson (2nd season)
- Home stadium: Edward L. Blackshear Field

1998 Southwestern Athletic Conference football standings
	Conf.			Overall
Team	W		L	W		L
No. 14 Southern $	8	–	0	9	–	3
Jackson State	7	–	1	7	–	4
Arkansas–Pine Bluff	6	–	2	8	–	3
Texas Southern	4	–	4	6	–	5
Grambling State	4	–	4	5	–	6
Alabama State	3	–	5	5	–	6
Alcorn State	3	–	5	5	–	6
Mississippi Valley State	1	–	7	1	–	10
Prairie View A&M	0	–	8	1	–	10
Alabama A&M	0	–	0	5	–	6
$ – Conference champion; Alabama A&M was transitioning from Division II and did not play a full SWAC schedule, so its games did not count in the official standings.; Rankings from The Sports Network Poll

The 1998 Prairie View A&M Panthers football team represented Prairie View A&M University as a member of the Southwestern Athletic Conference (SWAC) during the 1998 NCAA Division I-AA football season. Led by second-year head coach Greg Johnson, the Panthers compiled an overall record of 1–10, with a mark of 0–8 in conference play, and finished ninth in the SWAC.

Their win over Langston marked the end of their NCAA record 80-game losing streak that started during their 1989 season.

== Schedule ==
Date	Opponent	Site	Result	Attendance	Source
September 5	at Texas Southern	Astrodome; Houston, TX (Labor Day Classic)	L 13–24		
September 12	at Howard Payne*	Gordon Wood Stadium; Brownwood, TX	L 14–22		
September 19	vs. No. 18 Southern	Cardinal Stadium; Beaumont, TX	L 7–37		
September 26	vs. Langston*	Taft Stadium; Oklahoma City, OK	W 14–12	9,552	
October 3	vs. Grambling State	Cotton Bowl; Dallas, TX (State Fair Classic)	L 40–55	33,549	
October 10	Alcorn State	Edward L. Blackshear Field; Prairie View, TX	L 36–45		
October 17	Alabama State	Edward L. Blackshear Field; Prairie View, TX	L 20–30		
October 24	at Oklahoma Panhandle State*	Carl Wooten Field; Goodwell, OK	L 13–16		
October 31	at Mississippi Valley State	Magnolia Stadium; Itta Bena, MS	L 6–38		
November 7	at Arkansas–Pine Bluff	Pumphrey Stadium; Pine Bluff, AR	L 0–30		
November 14	at Jackson State	Mississippi Veterans Memorial Stadium; Jackson, MS	L 12–31		
*Non-conference game; Rankings from The Sports Network Poll released prior to the game
