= 1998 Jackson State Tigers football team =

American college football season

1998 Jackson State Tigers football
- Conference: Southwestern Athletic Conference
- Record: 7–4 (7–1 SWAC)
- Head coach: James Carson (7th season)
- Home stadium: Mississippi Veterans Memorial Stadium

1998 Southwestern Athletic Conference football standings
	Conf.			Overall
Team	W		L	W		L
No. 14 Southern $	8	–	0	9	–	3
Jackson State	7	–	1	7	–	4
Arkansas–Pine Bluff	6	–	2	8	–	3
Texas Southern	4	–	4	6	–	5
Grambling State	4	–	4	5	–	6
Alabama State	3	–	5	5	–	6
Alcorn State	3	–	5	5	–	6
Mississippi Valley State	1	–	7	1	–	10
Prairie View A&M	0	–	8	1	–	10
Alabama A&M	0	–	0	5	–	6
$ – Conference champion; Alabama A&M was transitioning from Division II and did not play a full SWAC schedule, so its games did not count in the official standings.; Rankings from The Sports Network Poll

The 1998 Jackson State Tigers football team represented Jackson State University as a member of the Southwestern Athletic Conference (SWAC) during the 1998 NCAA Division I-AA football season. Led by seventh-year head coach James Carson, the Tigers compiled an overall record of 7–4 and a mark of 7–1 in conference play, and finished second in the SWAC.

== Schedule ==
Date	Opponent	Site	Result	Attendance	Source
September 5	at Howard*	William H. Greene Stadium; Washington, DC	L 8–34	8,891	
September 12	vs. Tennessee State*	Liberty Bowl Memorial Stadium; Memphis, TN (Southern Heritage Classic)	L 21–33	55,545	
September 19	No. 19 Florida A&M*	Mississippi Veterans Memorial Stadium; Jackson, MS	L 7–45	13,500	
September 26	Mississippi Valley State	Mississippi Veterans Memorial Stadium; Jackson, MS	W 45–7	18,000	
October 3	Texas Southern	Mississippi Veterans Memorial Stadium; Jackson, MS	W 57–32		
October 10	vs. Alabama State	Ladd–Peebles Stadium; Mobile, AL (Gulf Coast Classic)	W 41–35	11,000	
October 17	at No. 23 Southern	A. W. Mumford Stadium; Baton Rouge, LA (rivalry)	L 28–33		
October 24	at Grambling State	Eddie G. Robinson Memorial Stadium; Grambling, LA	W 68–35	11,678	
October 31	at Arkansas–Pine Bluff	War Memorial Stadium; Little Rock, AR	W 41–34	11,659	
November 14	Prairie View A&M	Mississippi Veterans Memorial Stadium; Jackson, MS	W 31–12		
November 21	Alcorn State	Mississippi Veterans Memorial Stadium; Jackson, MS (Capital City Classic)	W 56–26	56,400	
*Non-conference game; Rankings from The Sports Network Poll released prior to the game
