= 1998 Middle Tennessee Blue Raiders football team =

American college football season

1998 Middle Tennessee Blue Raiders football
- Conference: Ohio Valley Conference
- Record: 5–5 (5–2 OVC)
- Head coach: Boots Donnelly (20th season)
- Offensive coordinator: John Bobo (2nd season)
- Defensive coordinator: Tom Fiveash (2nd season)
- Home stadium: Johnny "Red" Floyd Stadium

1998 Ohio Valley Conference football standings
	Conf.			Overall
Team	W		L	W		L
No. 12 Tennessee State $^	6	–	1	9	–	3
No. 24 Murray State	5	–	2	7	–	4
Middle Tennessee	5	–	2	5	–	5
Eastern Illinois	4	–	3	6	–	5
Eastern Kentucky	4	–	3	6	–	5
Tennessee Tech	2	–	5	4	–	7
Southeast Missouri State	2	–	5	3	–	8
Tennessee–Martin	0	–	7	0	–	11
$ – Conference champion; ^ – NCAA Division I-AA playoff participant; Rankings from The Sports Network poll

The 1998 Middle Tennessee Blue Raiders football team represented Middle Tennessee State University in the 1998 NCAA Division I-AA football season

== Schedule ==
Date	Opponent	Rank	Site	Result	Attendance	Source
September 5	Tennessee State	No. 22	Johnny "Red" Floyd Stadium; Murfreesboro, TN	W 28–27	27,568	
September 12	at Illinois*	No. 18	Memorial Stadium; Champaign, IL	L 20–48	35,475	
September 19	at Jacksonville State*	No. 20	Paul Snow Stadium; Jacksonville, AL	L 7–10	12,678	
September 26	No. 12 Eastern Kentucky		Johnny "Red" Floyd Stadium; Murfreesboro, TN	L 24–28	19,653	
October 3	at Tennessee Tech		Tucker Stadium; Cookeville, TN	W 19–16	12,237	
October 10	No. 13 Murray State		Johnny "Red" Floyd Stadium; Murfreesboro, TN	W 35–14	18,172	
October 24	No. 21 Eastern Illinois		Johnny "Red" Floyd Stadium; Murfreesboro, TN	L 32–35	19,862	
October 31	at Southeast Missouri State		Houck Stadium; Cape Girardeau, MO	W 21–19	6,827	
November 7	at Tennessee–Martin		Graham Stadium; Martin, TN	W 47–33	2,307	
November 14	at UAB*		Legion Field; Birmingham, AL	L 17–26	10,263	
*Non-conference game; Rankings from The Sports Network Poll released prior to the game

== After the season ==
=== NFL draft ===
The following Blue Raider was selected in the 1999 NFL draft following the season.

Round	Pick	Player	Position	NFL club
7	221	Sulecio Sanford	Wide receiver	Chicago Bears
