= 1998 Eastern Illinois Panthers football team =

American college football season

1998 Eastern Illinois Panthers football
- Conference: Ohio Valley Conference
- Record: 6–5 (4–3 OVC)
- Head coach: Bob Spoo (12th season)
- Home stadium: O'Brien Field

1998 Ohio Valley Conference football standings
	Conf.			Overall
Team	W		L	W		L
No. 12 Tennessee State $^	6	–	1	9	–	3
No. 24 Murray State	5	–	2	7	–	4
Middle Tennessee	5	–	2	5	–	5
Eastern Illinois	4	–	3	6	–	5
Eastern Kentucky	4	–	3	6	–	5
Tennessee Tech	2	–	5	4	–	7
Southeast Missouri State	2	–	5	3	–	8
Tennessee–Martin	0	–	7	0	–	11
$ – Conference champion; ^ – NCAA Division I-AA playoff participant; Rankings from The Sports Network poll

The 1998 Eastern Illinois Panthers represented Eastern Illinois University as a member of the Ohio Valley Conference (OVC) during the 1998 NCAA Division I-AA football season. Led by 12th-year head coach Bob Spoo, the Panthers compiled an overall record of 6–5 and a mark of 4–3 in conference play, placing fourth in the OVC. The team played home game O'Brien Field in Charleston, Illinois.

== Schedule ==
Date	Opponent	Site	Result	Attendance	Source
September 3	Saint Joseph's (IN)*	O'Brien Field; Charleston, IL	W 24–7		
September 12	at UCF*	Florida Citrus Bowl; Orlando, FL	L 0–48	35,219	
September 19	at Northern Illinois*	Huskie Stadium; DeKalb, IL	W 24–10	20,184	
September 26	Tennessee Tech	O'Brien Field; Charleston, IL	W 13–6		
October 3	Southeast Missouri State	O'Brien Field; Charleston, IL	W 35–33		
October 17	Illinois State*	O'Brien Field; Charleston, IL	L 22–36	9,064	
October 24	at Middle Tennessee	Johnny "Red" Floyd Stadium; Murfreesboro, TN	W 35–32		
October 31	Tennessee State	O'Brien Field; Charleston, IL	L 21–27		
November 7	Murray State	O'Brien Field; Charleston, IL	L 21–35		
November 14	at Tennessee–Martin	Graham Stadium; Martin, TN	W 56–35		
November 21	at Eastern Kentucky	Roy Kidd Stadium; Richmond, KY	L 24–28		
*Non-conference game
