= 1998 Tennessee State Tigers football team =

American college football season

1998 Tennessee State Tigers football

OVC champion

NCAA Division I-AA First Round, L 31–41 at Appalachian State
- Conference: Ohio Valley Conference

Ranking
- Sports Network: No. 12
- Record: 9–3 (6–1 OVC)
- Head coach: L. C. Cole (3rd season)
- Offensive coordinator: Johnnie Cole (3rd season)
- Defensive coordinator: Jake Cabell (3rd season)
- Home stadium: Hale Stadium

1998 Ohio Valley Conference football standings
	Conf.			Overall
Team	W		L	W		L
No. 12 Tennessee State $^	6	–	1	9	–	3
No. 24 Murray State	5	–	2	7	–	4
Middle Tennessee	5	–	2	5	–	5
Eastern Illinois	4	–	3	6	–	5
Eastern Kentucky	4	–	3	6	–	5
Tennessee Tech	2	–	5	4	–	7
Southeast Missouri State	2	–	5	3	–	8
Tennessee–Martin	0	–	7	0	–	11
$ – Conference champion; ^ – NCAA Division I-AA playoff participant; Rankings from The Sports Network poll

The 1998 Tennessee State Tigers football team represented Tennessee State University as a member of the Ohio Valley Conference (OVC) during the 1998 NCAA Division I-AA football season. Led by second-year head coach L. C. Cole, the Tigers compiled an overall record of 9–3 with a mark of 6–1 in conference play, winning the OVC title. Tennessee State advanced to the NCAA Division I-AA Football Championship playoffs, were the Tigers lost in the first round to Appalachian State. The team played home games at Hale Stadium in Nashville, Tennessee.

== Schedule ==
Date	Opponent	Rank	Site	Result	Attendance	Source
September 5	at Middle Tennessee		Johnny "Red" Floyd Stadium; Murfreesboro, TN	L 27–28	27,568	
September 12	vs. Jackson State*		Liberty Bowl Memorial Stadium; Memphis, TN (Southern Heritage Classic)	W 33–21		
September 26	vs. No. 16 Florida A&M*		Georgia Dome; Atlanta, GA (Atlanta Football Classic)	L 23–31	28,987	
October 3	Alabama A&M*		Hale Stadium; Nashville, TN	W 59–24		
October 10	at No. 8 Eastern Kentucky		Roy Kidd Stadium; Richmond, KY	W 31–21		
October 17	at Southeast Missouri State		Houck Stadium; Cape Girardeau, MO	W 38–27		
October 24	Tennessee–Martin		Hale Stadium; Nashville, TN	W 76–0		
October 31	at No. 18 Eastern Illinois		O'Brien Field; Charleston, IL	W 27–21		
November 7	at Tennessee Tech	No. 19	Tucker Stadium; Cookeville, TN	W 42–21		
November 14	No. 8 Murray State	No. 16	Roy Stewart Stadium; Murray, KY	W 46–44		
November 21	Texas Southern*	No. 11	Hale Stadium; Nashville, TN	W 28–14		
November 19	at No. 7 Appalachian State	No. 10	Kidd Brewer Stadium; Boone, NC (NCAA Division I-AA First Round)	L 31–45	3,885	
*Non-conference game; Rankings from The Sports Network Poll released prior to the game
