= 1998 Southern Jaguars football team =

American college football season

1998 Southern Jaguars football

Black college national champion SWAC champion

Heritage Bowl, W 28–2 vs. Bethune–Cookman
- Conference: Southwestern Athletic Conference

Ranking
- Sports Network: No. 14
- Record: 9–3 (8–0 SWAC)
- Head coach: Pete Richardson (6th season)
- Home stadium: A. W. Mumford Stadium

1998 Southwestern Athletic Conference football standings
	Conf.			Overall
Team	W		L	W		L
No. 14 Southern $	8	–	0	9	–	3
Jackson State	7	–	1	7	–	4
Arkansas–Pine Bluff	6	–	2	8	–	3
Texas Southern	4	–	4	6	–	5
Grambling State	4	–	4	5	–	6
Alabama State	3	–	5	5	–	6
Alcorn State	3	–	5	5	–	6
Mississippi Valley State	1	–	7	1	–	10
Prairie View A&M	0	–	8	1	–	10
Alabama A&M	0	–	0	5	–	6
$ – Conference champion; Alabama A&M was transitioning from Division II and did not play a full SWAC schedule, so its games did not count in the official standings.; Rankings from The Sports Network Poll

The 1998 Southern Jaguars football team represented Southern University as a member of the Southwestern Athletic Conference (SWAC) during the 1998 NCAA Division I-AA football season. Led by sixth-year head coach Pete Richardson, the Jaguars compiled an overall record of 9–3, with a conference record of 8–0, and finished as SWAC champion. At the conclusion of the season, the Jaguars were also recognized as black college national champion.

== Schedule ==
Date	Opponent	Rank	Site	Result	Attendance	Source
September 5	at No. 16 Northwestern State*	No. 12	Harry Turpin Stadium; Natchitoches, LA	L 7–28	16,706	
September 12	at Arkansas–Pine Bluff	No. 21	War Memorial Stadium; Little Rock, AR	W 17–14	18,854	
September 19	vs. Prairie View A&M	No. 18	Cardinal Stadium; Beaumont, TX	W 37–7		
September 26	Alabama State	No. 15	A. W. Mumford Stadium; Baton Rouge, LA	W 34–27	21,808	
October 3	Mississippi Valley State	No. 15	A. W. Mumford Stadium; Baton Rouge, LA	W 42–13		
October 10	at Alabama A&M*	No. 15	Louis Crews Stadium; Normal, AL	L 27–33		
October 17	Jackson State	No. 23	A. W. Mumford Stadium; Baton Rouge, LA (rivalry)	W 33–28		
October 24	at Alcorn State	No. 15	Jack Spinks Stadium; Lorman, MS	W 29–28	23,000	
November 7	No. 6 Florida A&M*	No. 13	A. W. Mumford Stadium; Baton Rouge, LA	L 48–50		
November 14	Texas Southern	No. 17	A. W. Mumford Stadium; Baton Rouge, LA	W 20–14		
November 28	vs. Grambling State	No. 15	Louisiana Superdome; New Orleans, LA (Bayou Classic)	W 26–14	60,986	
December 26	vs. No. 18 Bethune–Cookman*	No. 14	Georgia Dome; Atlanta, GA (Heritage Bowl)	W 28–2	32,955	
*Non-conference game; Rankings from The Sports Network Poll released prior to the game
