= Provost Umphrey Stadium =

Stadium

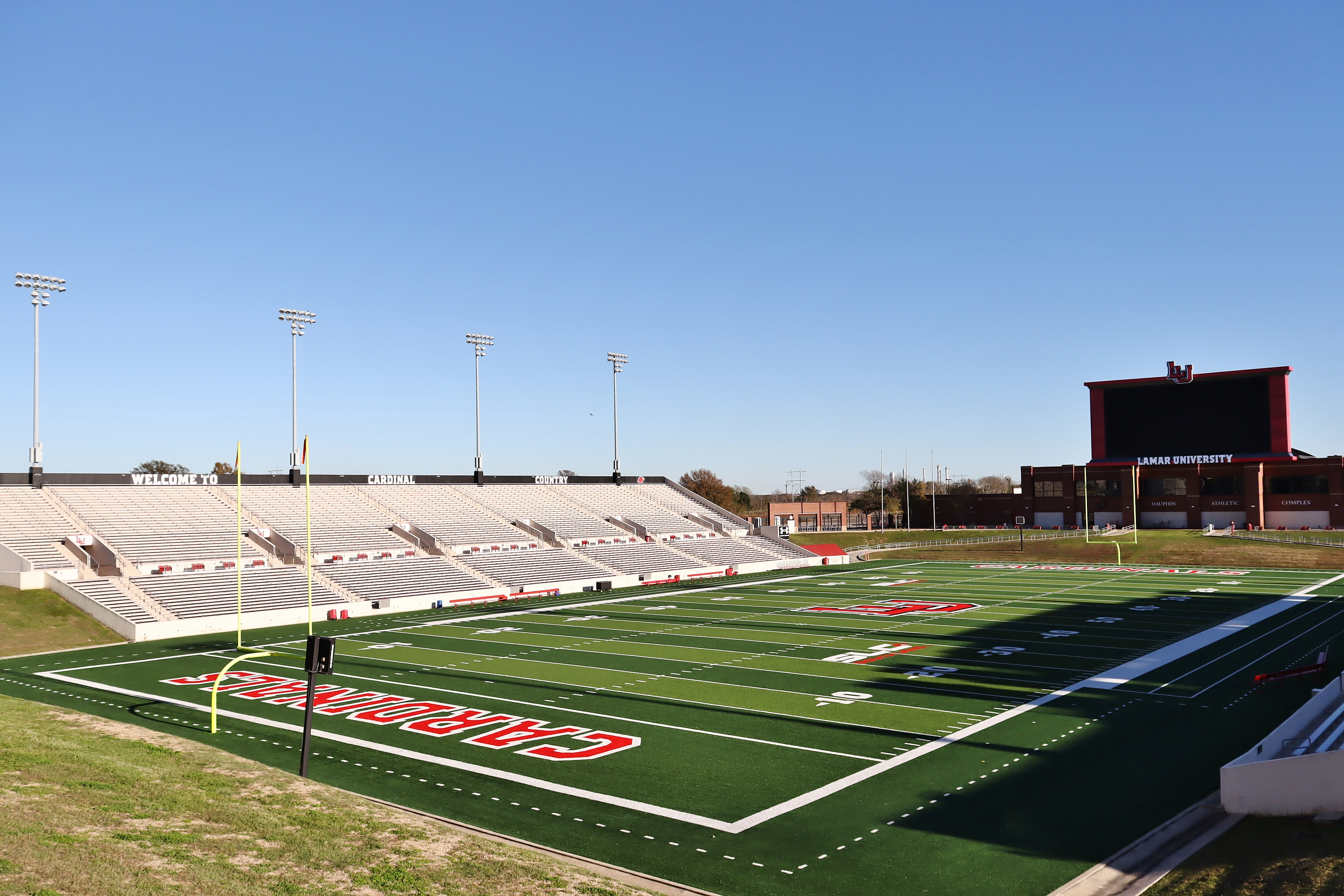
- Interactive map of Provost Umphrey Stadium
- Former names: Cardinal Stadium
- Address: 4400 Martin Luther King, Jr. Parkway, Beaumont, Texas 77710
- Location: Beaumont, Texas
- Coordinates: 30°2′35″N 94°4′12″W
- Owner: Lamar University
- Operator: Lamar University
- Capacity: 1964 (17,500); 2010 (16,000)
- Executive suites: Presidential Suite: 25 seats Morgan Suites: 7 Suites with 16 seats each Montagne Center Red Room: Up to 75
- Surface: (2021-current)Tarkett Fieldturf Classic HD Coolplay turf; (2009-21)Hellas Matrix Turf
- Scoreboard: SNA Displays 76'6" by 35'2" 10mm LED board Outer Frame 88' x 48'
- Record attendance: 18,500; September 13, 1980 vs Baylor

Construction
- Opened: 1964
- Renovated: 2010
- Cost: $1 million ($10.4 million in 2025 dollars) $30 million (2010 Renovation) ($44.3 million in 2025 dollars)
- Architect: Renovation: Leo A. Daly
- Main contractor: Renovation: SETEX Construction Corp.

Tenant
- Lamar Cardinals football (NCAA)

Provost Umphrey Stadium (previously Cardinal Stadium) is a 16,000-seat multi-purpose stadium located on the campus of Lamar University in Beaumont, Texas. The stadium, home to the Lamar Cardinals football team, is located next to the Montagne Center. While primarily used for football, Provost Umphrey Stadium is also a concert venue with seating up to 20,000 for concerts. The stadium was completely renovated in 2009 and is designed to allow for a future expansion to 28,000.

== Stadium features ==
=== Main seating areas ===
The stadium is configured in a predominantly northeast–southwest placement with two sides of seating. Entrance into the stadium is via one of four entrance gates located at the Southwest, Northwest, Southeast, and Northeast of the stadium. Ticket booths are located near the gates. Seating access to each of the stadium sides is provided at street level through a covered concourse. Concessions, six areas in total, as well as twelve rest room facilities are located in the concourse area. In addition, flat screen televisions are located throughout. Large photographic murals from games in the earlier days of the stadium are mounted on the concourse walls.

With the exception of the press box and chair back seating sections on the west side, each side of the stadium is basically a mirror image of the other. Each side is divided into two main levels with one level below street level and the other elevated. A street level outdoor concourse separates the two levels. A walkway on the south side of the stadium extends from each of the outdoor concourses and connects the two stadium sides providing easy pedestrian access from one side of the stadium to the other.

=== Additional seating ===
In addition to the two sides, the Morgan VIP suites located in the Montagne Center on the north end zone side of the stadium provide 112 seats (16 seats for each of the 7 suites). The Montagne Center Red Room, located above the VIP suites and overlooking the stadium, can accommodate up to 75 guests. Overflow attendance can be accommodated by large grassy areas located on both the north and south sides of the stadium. (Seating in the grassy areas is not included in the stated 16,000 stadium capacity.) The two southern porch sections of the Montagne Center also provide additional seating. Additionally, a presidential suite which can hold 25 is located in the press box. The presidential suite includes a kitchenette.

The outdoor concourses and south side walkway also contain a total of one hundred eight (108) chair-back seats as well as additional space for wheelchair seating. Each side has forty chair-back seats and additional space for wheelchair seating. In addition, the south side walkway includes twenty-eight (28) chair-back seats and wheelchair seating space. The seating sections were added as part of the stadium's complete renovation in 2009 and were part of stadium enhancements made to make the stadium compliant with the Americans with Disabilities Act of 1990.

=== Press box ===
The two-story press box, named the Dan F. and Sandra A. Smith Press Box, includes a media center with seating for 32; a TV broadcast booth; two radio broadcast booths; a kitchenette; restrooms; two camera decks; two coaches booths; scoreboard booth; public address booth; and private suites as well as the 25 seat presidential suite discussed above in the Additional seating section. Press box access is via an elevator located at the rear of the press box and from west side seating.

=== Dauphin Athletic Complex ===
The two-story Dauphin Athletic Complex, constructed in 2010, is located adjacent to the southern end of the stadium. The 54,000-square-foot (5,000 m^{2}) complex includes an academic center; a 108-seat team auditorium; meeting rooms; locker rooms for both home and visiting teams; and offices for the athletic director, coaches, and other athletic department personnel. Also included is the J. B. Higgins Weight Room with 8,000 square feet (740 m^{2}) of weight training space, three offices, a storage room, and media room. The university's main athletic training facility, The Beaumont Bone and Joint Institute Sports Medicine Facility, is also located in the complex. It includes a hydrotherapy pool with Hydroworx 1200 treadmill therapy pool, a plunge pool, electrical stimulation and ultrasound units, and a deep-penetrating vibration therapy device. The training facility is one of four on campus training facilities.

=== Scoreboards ===
Mounted on top of the Dauphin Athletic Complex is the Education First Credit Union scoreboard. The scoreboard, installed in 2011, was replaced in 2023. The new video board, which "...measures 76'6" by 35'2" with over 2,700 square feet of LED lighting is 200 percent larger..." than the former video board. The new SNA Displays board, with 10mm high-definition video, has the same footprint as the older board, 88' x 48'. Another scoreboard is located near the base of the Morgan Suites on the northern end of the stadium.

=== Recap ===
- Presidential Suite - accommodating 25, with kitchenette
- Private suites - located in the press box (capacity not noted)
- Morgan VIP Suites - 7 (accommodating 16 each)
- Over 1,500 chair back seats with cup holders in the center sections of the west side
- ADA compliant seating - 108 chair back seats and wheel chair areas.
- Montagne Center Red Room - accommodates up to 75
- 54,000-square-foot (5,000 m^{2}) athletic complex
- 76'6" by 35'2" SNA Displays video board housed in an 88' X 48' outer frame
- Tarkett Fieldturf Classic HD CoolPlay turf (replacing Hellas Matrix turf in 2021)
- Six concession stands
- 12 restrooms

== History ==
Cardinal Stadium, as it was originally known, was completed in 1964 for a cost of $1 million. The original stadium capacity was 17,500. The stadium was built as the home of the Lamar Cardinals football team. The football team was disbanded in 1989. Until plans to reinstate the Lamar Cardinal football program were finalized, the stadium hosted some Ozen High School football home games as well as the university soccer team for its first two seasons.

Presidential candidate, Barry Goldwater, spoke before an estimated 15,000-18,000 persons at the stadium on October 15, 1964.

On September 19, 1998, the stadium played host to the 1998 Southern vs. Prairie View A&M football game as a "neutral ground" location. The game was the final loss of 80 straight losses for the Prairie View program, but is more well known for a halftime brawl between the marching bands of the two schools resulting in a two-game suspension for both bands. Southern won the game 37–7.

In 2009 the university started renovation on the newly- named Provost Umphrey Stadium for the return of football in 2010. Capacity was reduced to 16,000 in the 2010 renovation due to modifications in order to make the stadium ADA compliant. The modifications resulted in the loss of 1,500 seats. Provost Umphrey Stadium renovations and a new adjacent 54,000-square-foot (5,000 m^{2}) athletic complex, detailed above, were completed for a combined total of $30 million. Another component of the stadium renovation included the addition of a new video board

In July, 2021, the Hellas Matrix turf was replaced by Tarkett Fieldturf Classic HD Coolplay turf

== Donations and gifts ==
On November 10, 2008, the stadium became Provost Umphrey Stadium in recognition of a $3 million contribution to Lamar University from the Provost Umphrey law firm and an additional $1 million gift from Walter and Sheila Umphrey.

On March 19, 2009, alumnus Dan F. Smith donated $6 million to the University, $1 million of which was earmarked for the return of football. In recognition of this gift the press box bears his name. The press box is detailed above in the Stadium Features section.

On February 15, 2010 Education First Federal Credit Union donated $1 million to Lamar Athletics. In recognition for their support the 51' by 26' ft digital score board will permanently have Education First FCU displayed.

On May 6, 2010, the Morgan Charitable Foundation on behalf of Glen and Teri Morgan donated an undisclosed amount of money to build the Morgan Suites on the south east side of the Montagne Center. Seven new suites were built and lease for $25,000 per year with a three-year commitment. The leases include 16 tickets to each home game and parking passes. Revenue from leasing the suites supports football scholarships. Each suite includes a bar with four stools overlooking two tiered rows of 6 seats each, a total of 16 seats. The suites open to the front and feature motorized windows that can be lowered as desired. Each suite includes a small refrigerator and cabinet space. Food and beverage service is available through the university catering vendor at additional charge.

== Attendance records ==
The largest crowd to see an Lamar Cardinal football game in Provost Umphrey Stadium was 18,500 on September 13, 1980, when the Cardinals hosted Baylor University.

Below is a list of the Cardinals best-attended home games (all at Provost Umphrey Stadium). (Complete records not available for 1974-1981 and 1983–1989)

Rk.	Date	Opponent	Attendance
Highest attendance
1	September 13, 1980	Baylor	18,500
2	September 22, 1979	Louisiana Tech	17,600
3	October 9, 2010	Langston University	17,306
4	October 6, 1979	West Texas State	17,250
5	September 17, 1977	Louisiana-Lafayette	17,222
6	October 2, 2010	Sam Houston State	17,187
7	September 11, 2010	Webber International	16,600
8	October 16, 2010	South Alabama	16,150
9	October 9, 1965	Arkansas State	16,000
10	September 24, 1966	Southwest Missouri	15,643
11	September 9, 1972	Sam Houston State	15,561
12 tie	September 3, 2011	Texas College	15,367
12 tie	September 17, 2011	Incarnate Word	15,367
12 tie	October 8, 2011	Northwestern State	15,367
12 tie	October 22, 2011	Central Arkansas	15,367
12 tie	September 8, 2012	Prairie View A&M	15,367
17	October 2, 1965	Pensacola Navy	15,208
18	October 11, 1970	McNeese State	15,165
19	November 4, 1967	Trinity	15,153
20	November 13, 2010	South Dakota	15,103

As of the 2023 season.

=== Yearly attendance ===
Below is the available home attendance since stadium opening in 1964.

Season	Average	High
Lamar Cardinals
2026	8,180	11,126
2025	7,657	13,674
2024	6,706	8,443
2023	5,643	6,593
2022	5,069	6,627
2021	5,716	6,812
2020	3,293*	3,833*
2019	7,173	9,218
2018	7,077	8,028
2017	6,631	8,417
2016	7,429	8,697
2015	9,364	13,136
2014	8,347	10,212
2013	8,379	10,738
2012	11,119	15,367
2011	14,442	15,367
2010	16,078	17,306
	Program reinstated in 2010	
1984-89	Attendance missing or partial	
1983	12,495	14,381
1982	7,856	13,330
1975-81	Attendance missing or partial	
1974	12,495	14,381
1973	10,565	13,220
1972	10,766	16,226
1971	11,428	13,220
1970	11,178	15,165
1969	11,177	13,747
1968	9,139	10,874
1967	13,087	15,153
1966	12,541	15,643
1965	12,560	16,000
1964	12,495	14,381

As of the 2023 season.
* Attendance restricted to 25% of stadium capacity due to COVID19 precautions

== Gallery ==
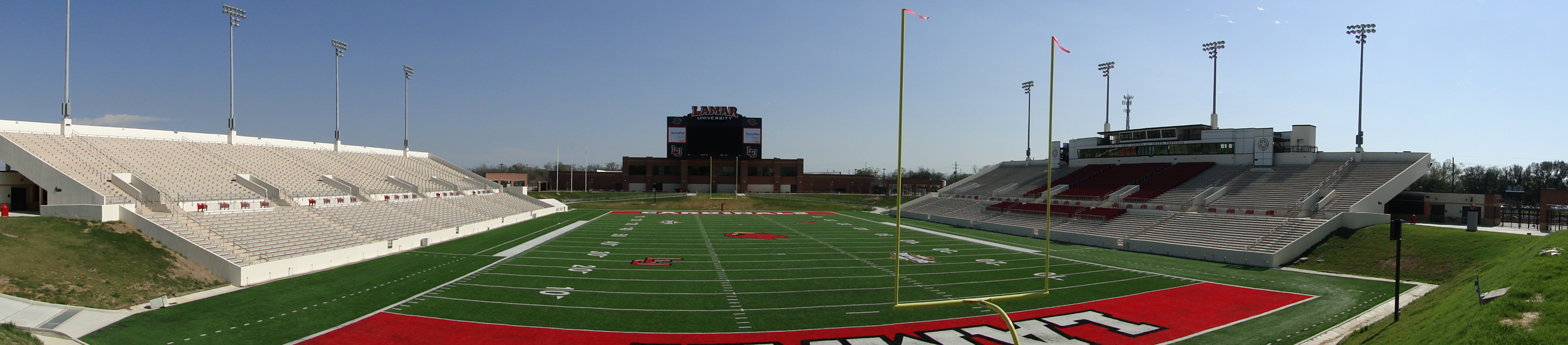
Provost Umphrey Stadium as seen from the Morgan Suites inside the Montagne Center
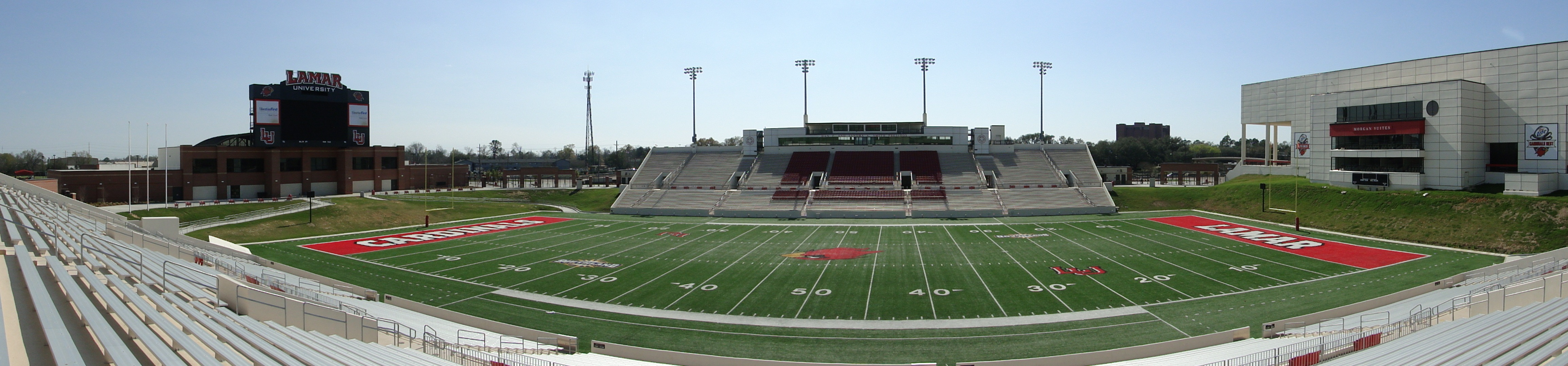
Provost Umphrey Stadium as seen from the east side
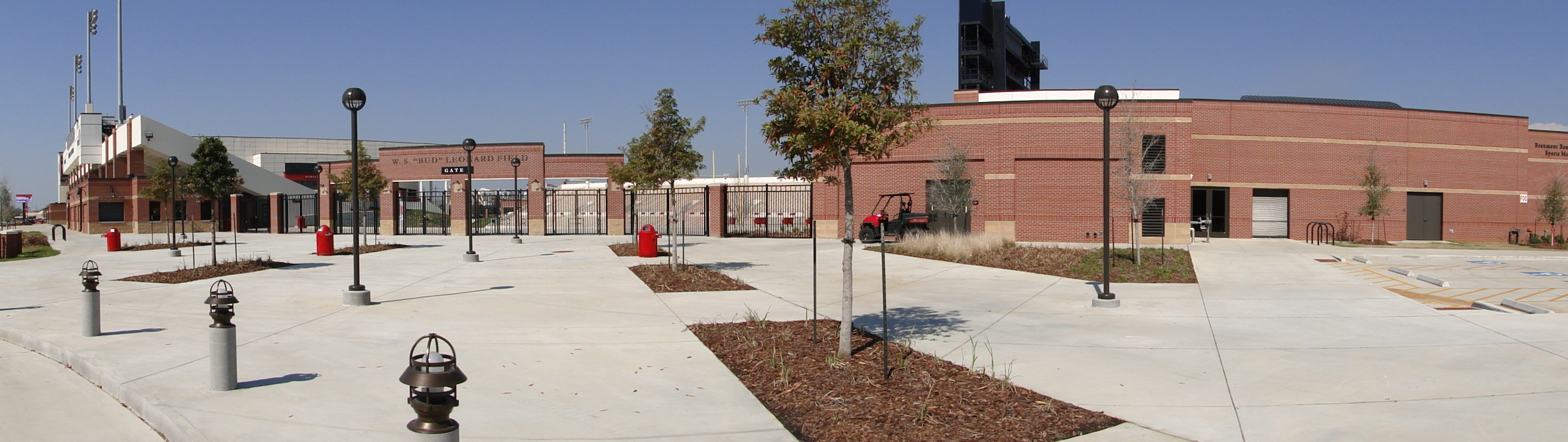
Provost Umphrey Stadium entrance
Views around the stadium

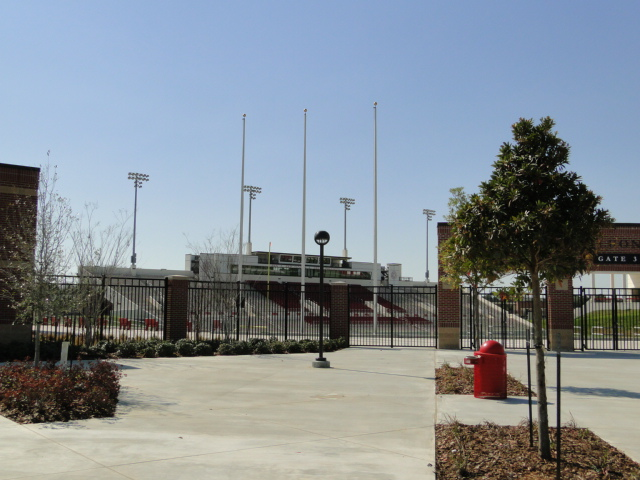
Visiting Entrance

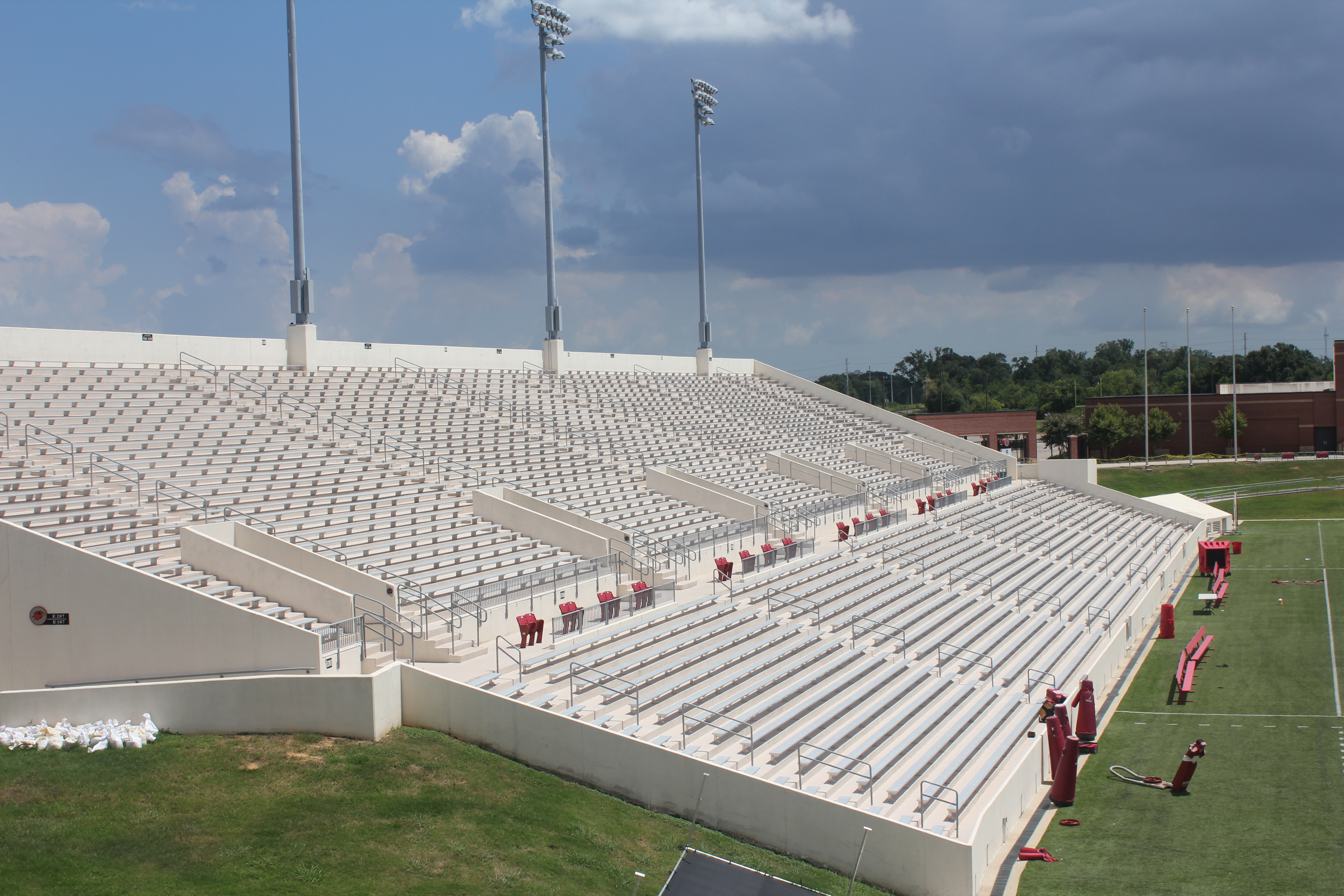
View of east side seating

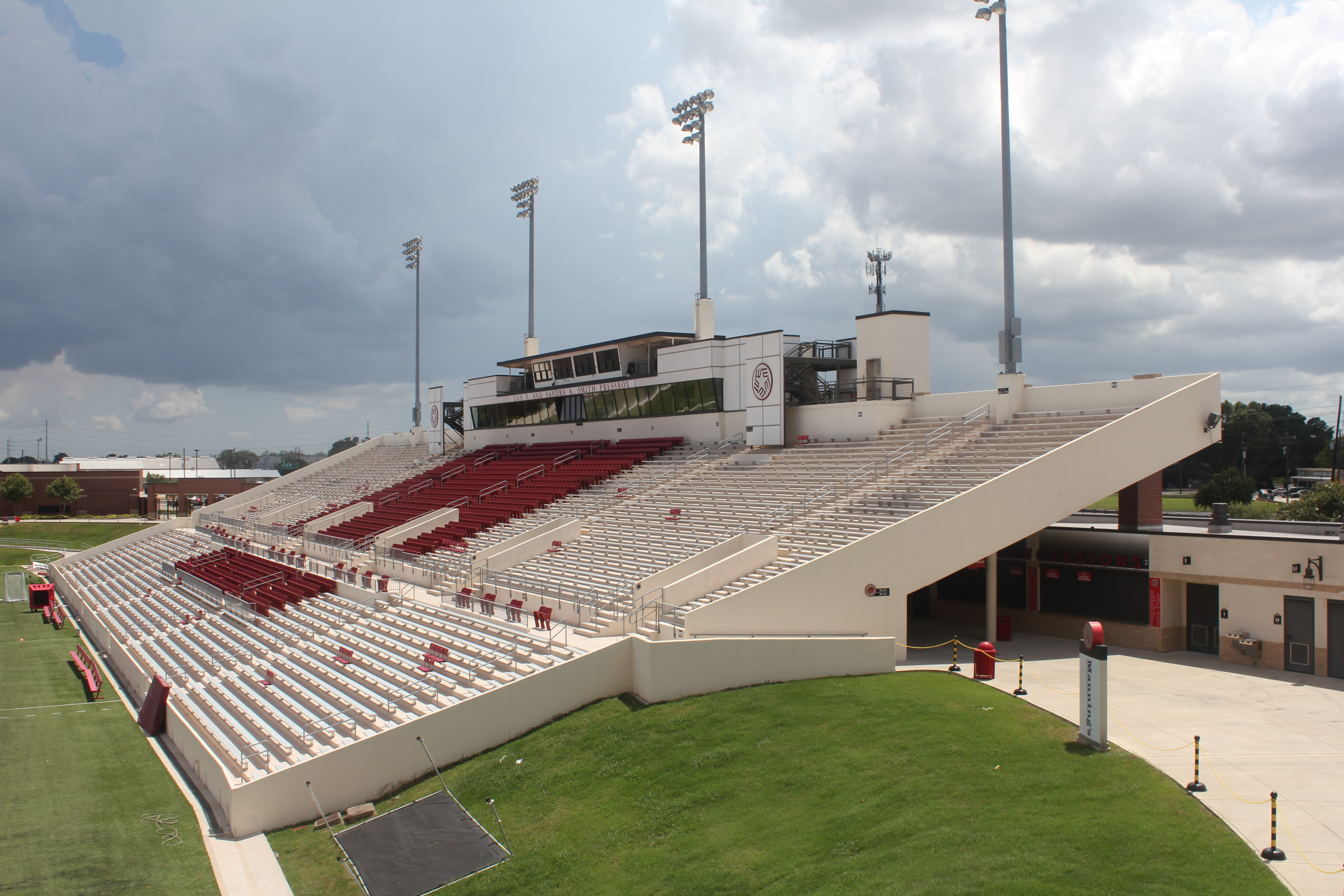
View of the west side seating

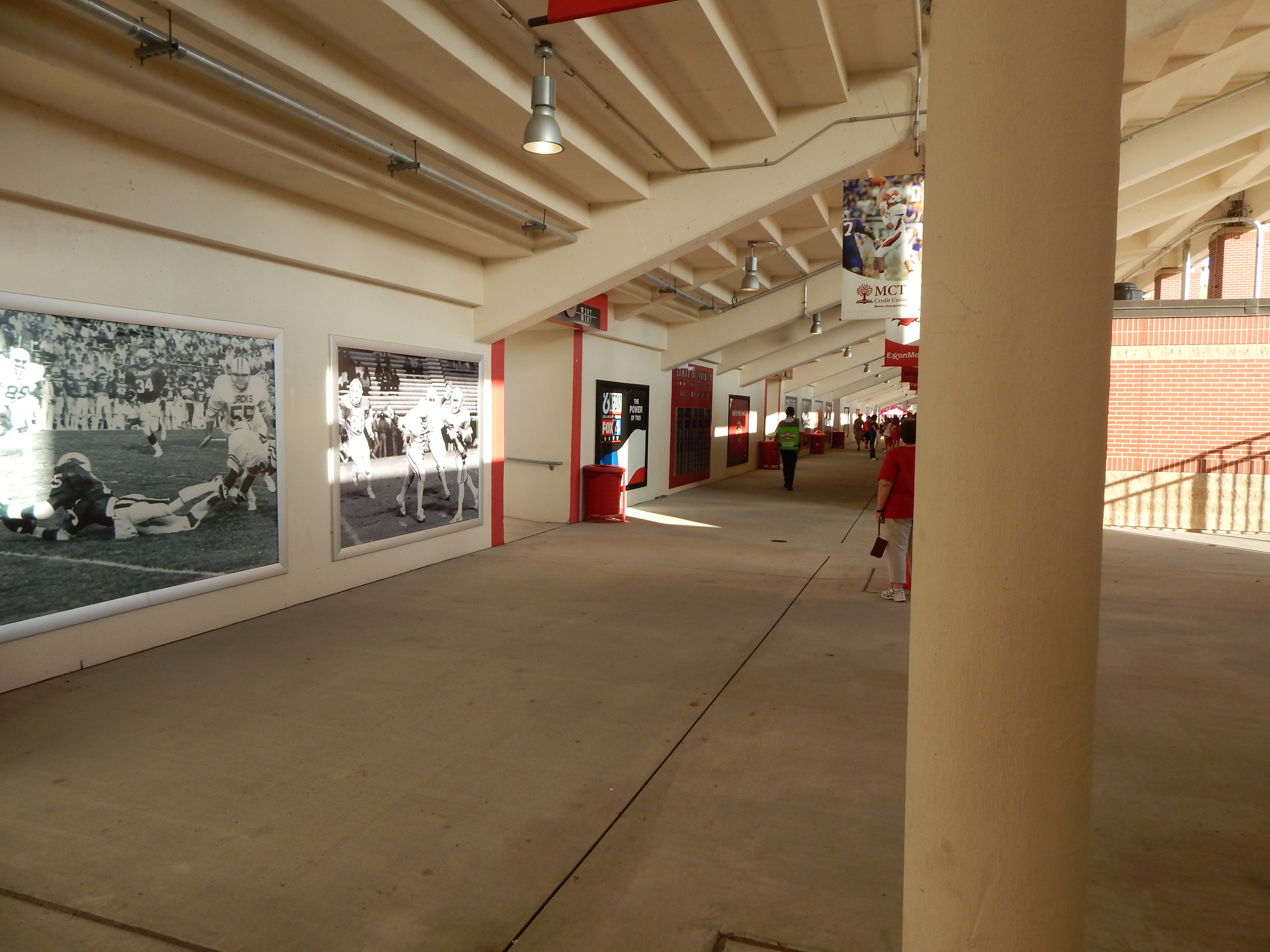
Murals on the concourse wall

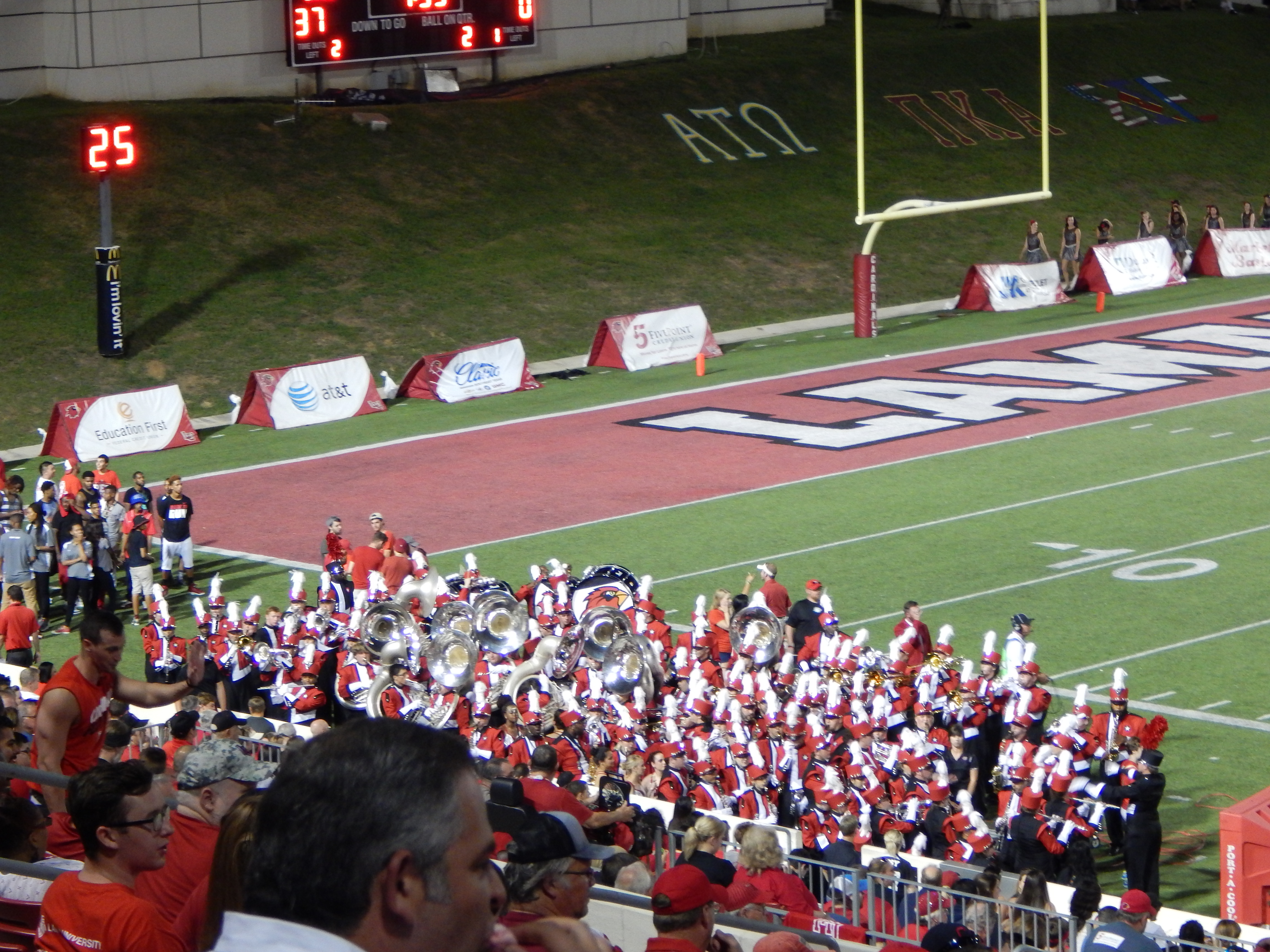
Toward the north end zone

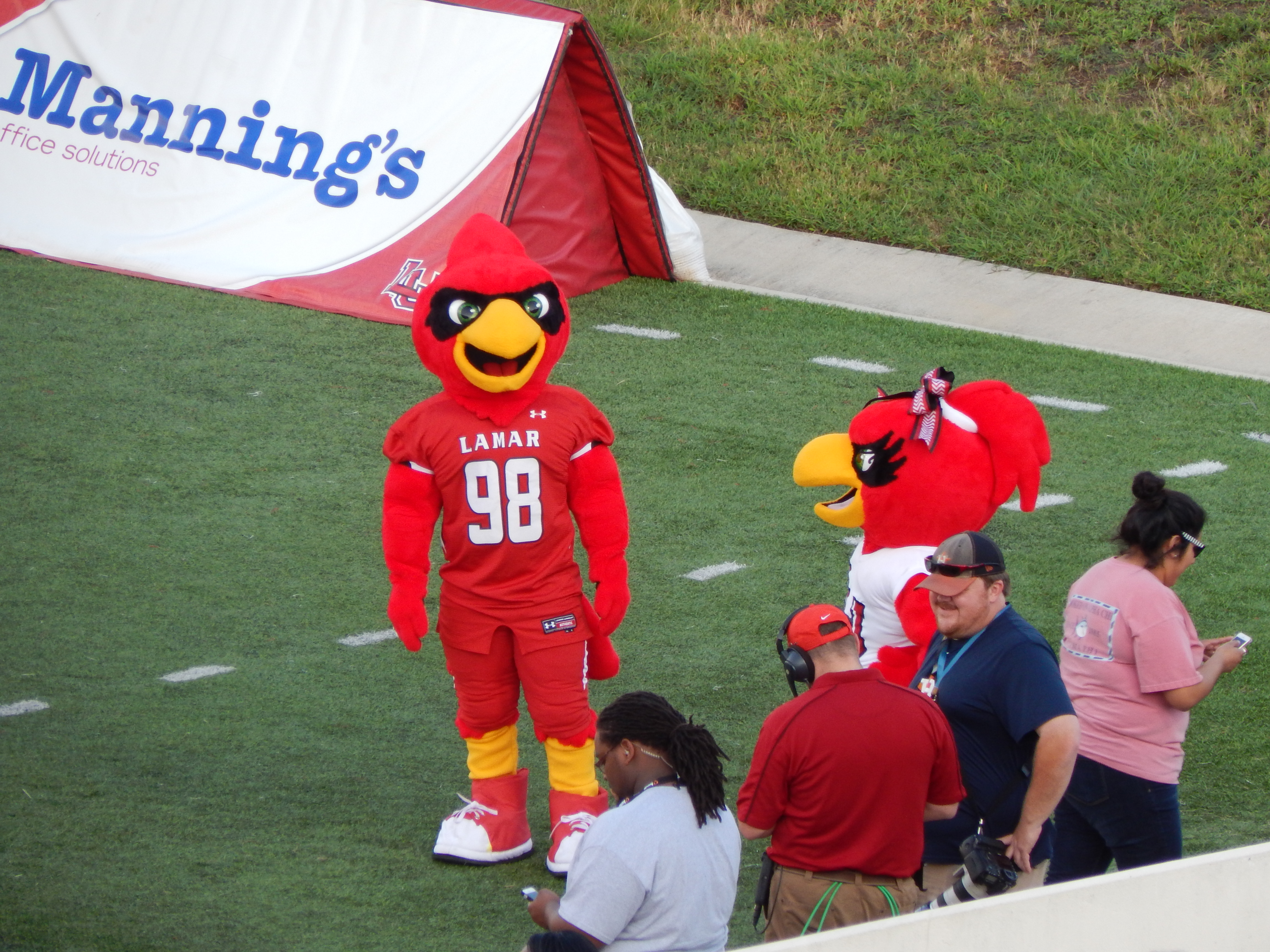
Big Red mascots before the game

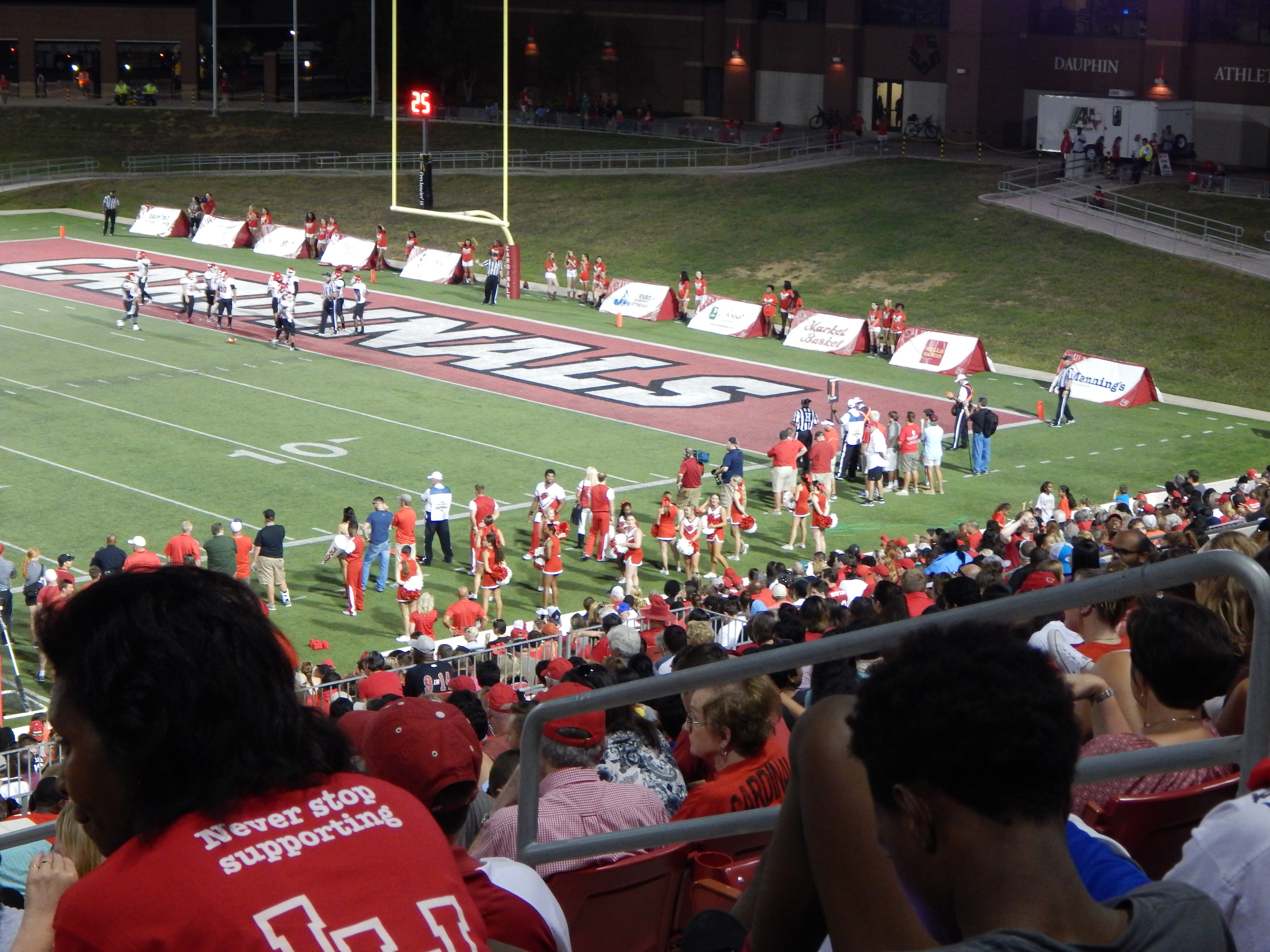
Toward the south end zone

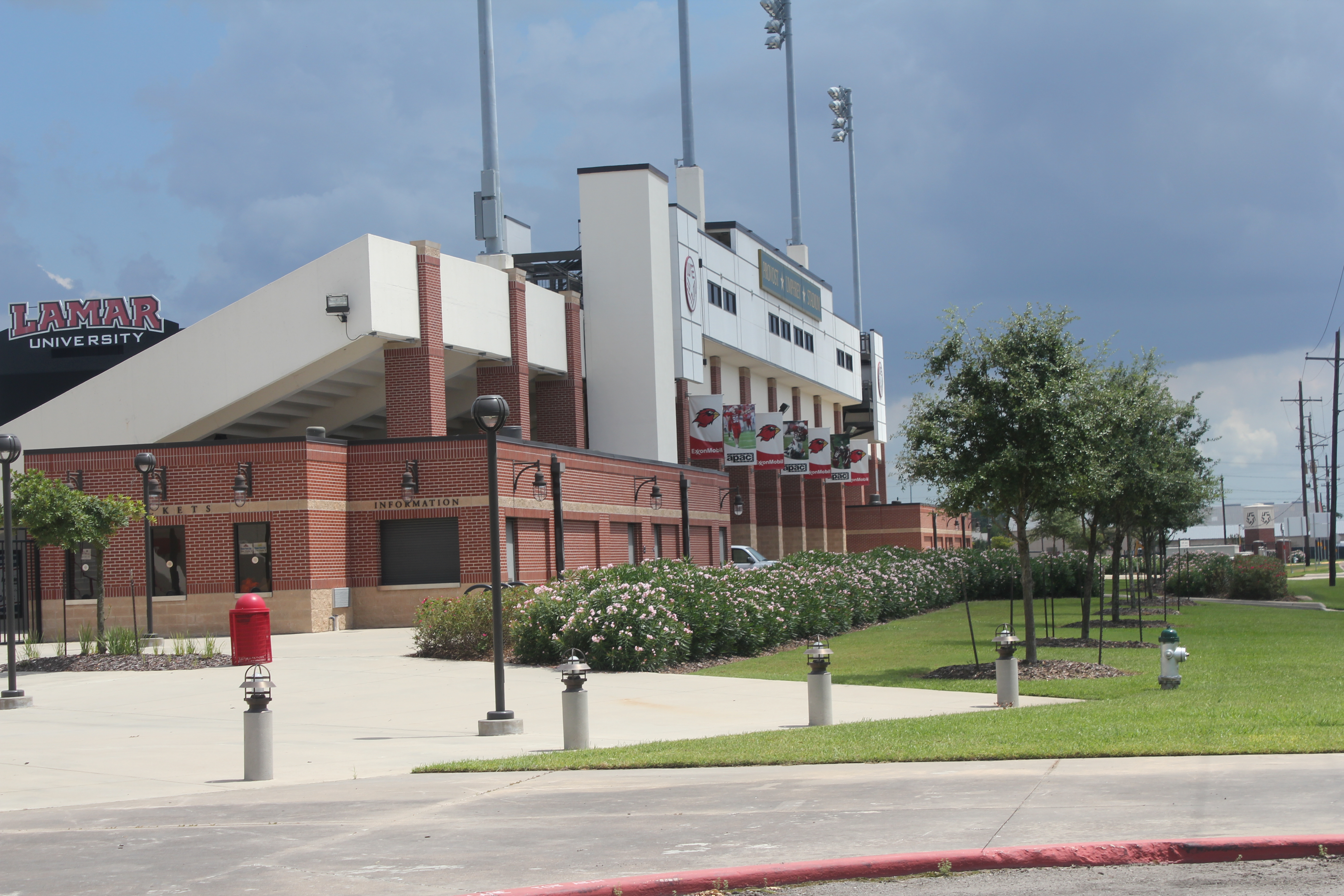
Provost Umphrey outside of stadium

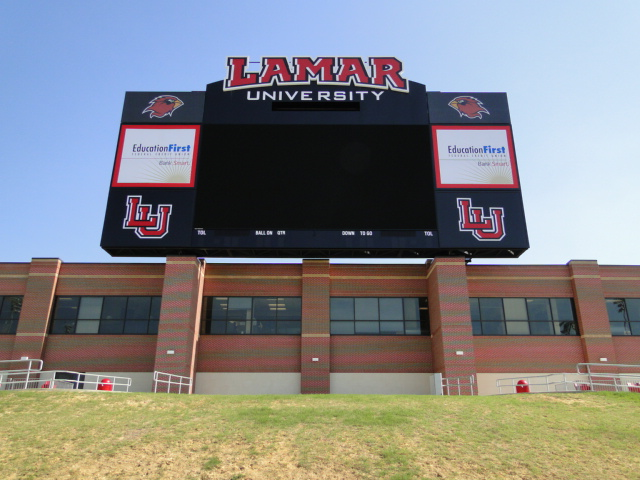
51' x 26' video display encased in 88' x 48' score board frame

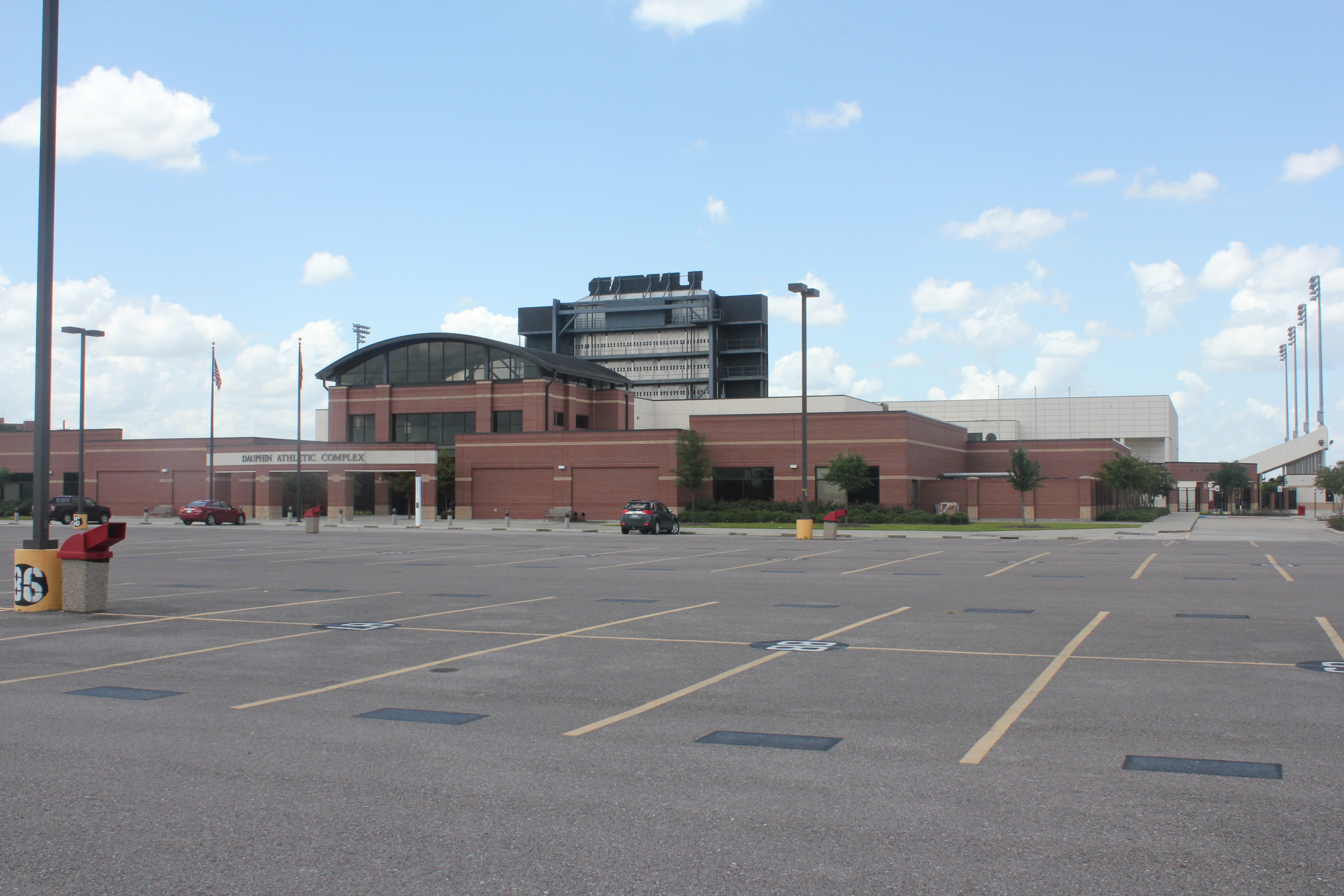
Dauphin Athletic Complex entrance

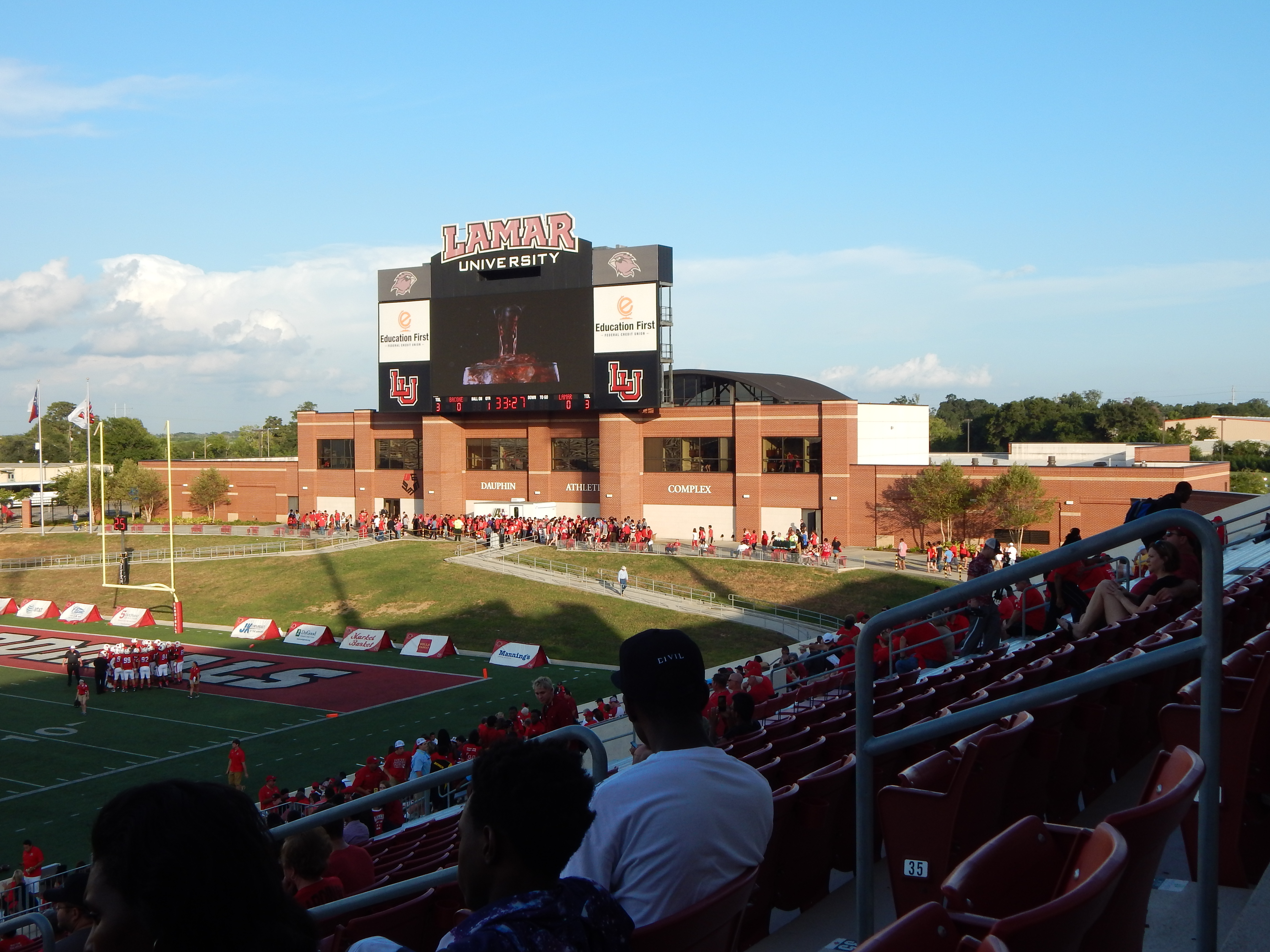
Dauphin Athletic Complex and scoreboard from west side seating 30 minutes before game time

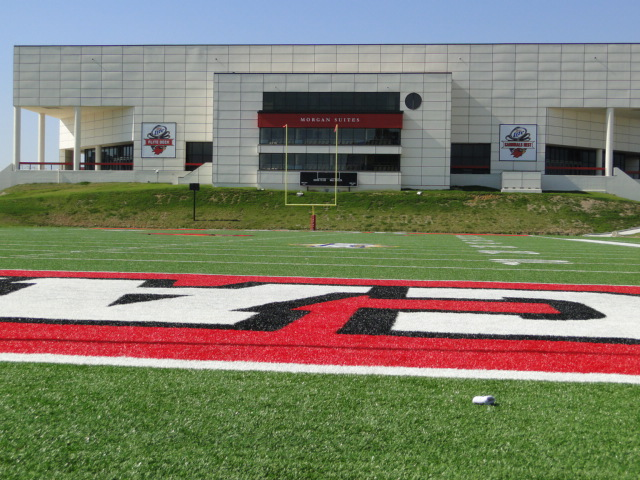
Morgan Suites and Montagne Center

== See also ==
- List of NCAA Division I FCS football stadiums
