= 1998 NCAA Division I-AA football season =

American college football season

1998 NCAA Division I-AA season

Regular season
- Number of teams: 121
- Duration: August–November
- Payton Award: Jerry Azumah (RB, New Hampshire)
- Buchanan Award: James Milton (LB, Western Illinois)

Playoff
- Duration: November 28–December 19
- Championship date: December 19, 1998
- Championship site: Finley Stadium; Chattanooga, Tennessee
- Champion: UMass

NCAA Division I-AA football seasons
- «1997 1999»

The 1998 NCAA Division I-AA football season, part of college football in the United States organized by the National Collegiate Athletic Association (NCAA) at the Division I-AA level, began in August 1998, and concluded with the 1998 NCAA Division I-AA Football Championship Game on December 19, 1998, at Finley Stadium in Chattanooga, Tennessee. The UMass Minutemen won their first I-AA championship, defeating the Georgia Southern Eagles by a score of 55−43.

== Conference changes and new programs ==
School	1997 Conference	1998 Conference
Alabama A&M	SIAC (D-II)	SWAC
Boston University	Atlantic 10	Dropped Program
Evansville	Pioneer	Dropped Program
Jacksonville	New Program	I-AA Independent
Sacred Heart	Eastern (D-II)	Northeast

== Conference standings ==
1998 Atlantic 10 Conference football standings
	Conf.			Overall
Team	W		L	W		L
New England Division
No. 1 UMass x^	6	–	2	12	–	3
No. 9 Connecticut x^	6	–	2	10	–	3
Maine	3	–	5	6	–	5
New Hampshire	3	–	5	4	–	7
Rhode Island	2	–	6	3	–	8
Mid-Atlantic Division
No. 10 Richmond x$^	7	–	1	9	–	3
No. 23 Delaware	4	–	4	7	–	4
Villanova	4	–	4	6	–	5
No. 17 William & Mary	4	–	4	7	–	4
Northeastern	3	–	5	5	–	6
James Madison	2	–	6	3	–	8
$ – Conference champion; x – Division champion/co-champions; ^ – NCAA Division I-AA playoff participant; Rankings from The Sports Network poll

1998 Big Sky Conference football standings
	Conf.			Overall
Team	W		L	W		L
No. 15 Montana $^	6	–	2	8	–	4
Cal State Northridge	5	–	3	7	–	4
No. 25 Montana State	5	–	3	7	–	4
Weber State	4	–	4	6	–	5
Eastern Washington	4	–	4	5	–	6
Portland State	4	–	4	5	–	6
Northern Arizona	3	–	5	6	–	5
Sacramento State	3	–	5	5	–	6
Idaho State	2	–	6	3	–	8
$ – Conference champion; ^ – NCAA Division I-AA playoff participant; Rankings from The Sports Network poll

1998 Gateway Football Conference standings
	Conf.			Overall
Team	W		L	W		L
No. 4 Western Illinois $^	5	–	1	11	–	3
No. 16 Illinois State ^	4	–	2	8	–	4
Northern Iowa	3	–	3	7	–	4
Youngstown State	3	–	3	6	–	5
Southwest Missouri State	3	–	3	5	–	6
Indiana State	2	–	4	5	–	6
Southern Illinois	1	–	5	3	–	8
$ – Conference champion; ^ – NCAA Division I-AA playoff participant; Rankings from The Sports Network poll

1998 Ivy League football standings
	Conf.			Overall
Team	W		L	W		L
Penn $	6	–	1	8	–	2
Brown	5	–	2	7	–	3
Yale	5	–	2	6	–	4
Princeton	4	–	3	5	–	5
Columbia	3	–	4	4	–	6
Harvard	3	–	4	4	–	6
Cornell	1	–	6	4	–	6
Dartmouth	1	–	6	2	–	8
$ – Conference champion

1998 Metro Atlantic Athletic Conference football standings
	Conf.			Overall
Team	W		L	W		L
Fairfield +	7	–	1	9	–	2
Georgetown +	7	–	1	9	–	2
Duquesne	6	–	2	8	–	3
Marist	6	–	2	7	–	3
St. John's	4	–	4	6	–	5
Iona	2	–	6	4	–	6
Siena	2	–	6	3	–	6
Canisius	2	–	6	3	–	7
Saint Peter's	0	–	8	0	–	10
+ – Conference co-champions

1998 Mid-Eastern Athletic Conference football standings
	Conf.			Overall
Team	W		L	W		L
No. 5 Florida A&M +^	7	–	1	11	–	2
No. 11 Hampton +^	7	–	1	9	–	3
No. 18 Bethune–Cookman	6	–	2	8	–	3
North Carolina A&T	5	–	3	8	–	3
Howard	5	–	3	7	–	4
South Carolina State	3	–	5	5	–	6
Norfolk State	2	–	6	2	–	9
Morgan State	1	–	7	1	–	10
Delaware State	0	–	8	0	–	11
+ – Conference co-champions; ^ – NCAA Division I-AA playoff participant; Rankings from The Sports Network poll

1998 Northeast Conference football standings
	Conf.			Overall
Team	W		L	W		L
Monmouth +	4	–	1	5	–	5
Robert Morris +	4	–	1	4	–	6
Wagner	3	–	2	7	–	3
Central Connecticut State	3	–	2	4	–	6
Sacred Heart	1	–	4	2	–	8
Saint Francis (PA)	0	–	5	0	–	10
+ – Conference co-champions

1998 Ohio Valley Conference football standings
	Conf.			Overall
Team	W		L	W		L
No. 12 Tennessee State $^	6	–	1	9	–	3
No. 24 Murray State	5	–	2	7	–	4
Middle Tennessee	5	–	2	5	–	5
Eastern Illinois	4	–	3	6	–	5
Eastern Kentucky	4	–	3	6	–	5
Tennessee Tech	2	–	5	4	–	7
Southeast Missouri State	2	–	5	3	–	8
Tennessee–Martin	0	–	7	0	–	11
$ – Conference champion; ^ – NCAA Division I-AA playoff participant; Rankings from The Sports Network poll

1998 Patriot League football standings
	Conf.			Overall
Team	W		L	W		L
No. 7 Lehigh $^	6	–	0	12	–	1
No. 21 Colgate ^	5	–	1	8	–	4
Bucknell	3	–	3	6	–	5
Lafayette	3	–	3	3	–	8
Fordham	2	–	4	4	–	7
Towson	1	–	5	5	–	6
Holy Cross	1	–	5	2	–	9
$ – Conference champion; ^ – NCAA Division I-AA playoff participant; Rankings from The Sports Network poll

1998 Pioneer Football League standings
	Conf.			Overall
Team	W		L	W		L
Drake $	4	–	0	7	–	3
Dayton	3	–	1	6	–	4
Valparaiso	2	–	2	5	–	6
Butler	1	–	3	4	–	6
San Diego	0	–	4	2	–	8
$ – Conference champion

1998 Southern Conference football standings
	Conf.			Overall
Team	W		L	W		L
No. 2 Georgia Southern $^	8	–	0	14	–	1
No. 6 Appalachian State ^	6	–	2	10	–	3
Western Carolina	5	–	3	6	–	5
Chattanooga	4	–	4	5	–	6
The Citadel	4	–	4	5	–	6
East Tennessee State	3	–	5	4	–	7
Wofford	3	–	5	4	–	7
Furman	3	–	5	5	–	6
VMI	0	–	8	1	–	10
$ – Conference champion; ^ – NCAA Division I-AA playoff participant; Rankings from The Sports Network I-AA Poll

1998 Southland Football League standings
	Conf.			Overall
Team	W		L	W		L
No. 3 Northwestern State $^	6	–	1	11	–	3
No. 8 McNeese State ^	5	–	2	9	–	3
No. 13 Troy State ^	5	–	2	8	–	4
Jacksonville State	4	–	3	7	–	4
Nicholls State	3	–	4	4	–	7
Southwest Texas State	2	–	5	4	–	7
Stephen F. Austin	2	–	5	3	–	8
Sam Houston State	1	–	6	3	–	8
$ – Conference champion; ^ – NCAA Division I-AA playoff participant; Rankings from The Sports Network poll

1998 Southwestern Athletic Conference football standings
	Conf.			Overall
Team	W		L	W		L
No. 14 Southern $	8	–	0	9	–	3
Jackson State	7	–	1	7	–	4
Arkansas–Pine Bluff	6	–	2	8	–	3
Texas Southern	4	–	4	6	–	5
Grambling State	4	–	4	5	–	6
Alabama State	3	–	5	5	–	6
Alcorn State	3	–	5	5	–	6
Mississippi Valley State	1	–	7	1	–	10
Prairie View A&M	0	–	8	1	–	10
Alabama A&M	0	–	0	5	–	6
$ – Conference champion; Alabama A&M was transitioning from Division II and did not play a full SWAC schedule, so its games did not count in the official standings.; Rankings from The Sports Network Poll

1998 NCAA Division I-AA independents football standings
	Conf.			Overall
Team	W		L	W		L
Morehead State		–		9	–	2
Davidson		–		8	–	2
No. 20 Hofstra		–		8	–	3
No. 22 South Florida		–		8	–	3
No. 19 Western Kentucky		–		7	–	4
Samford		–		6	–	5
Liberty		–		5	–	6
Southern Utah		–		5	–	6
Austin Peay		–		4	–	7
Buffalo		–		4	–	7
Jacksonville		–		4	–	5
La Salle		–		3	–	6
Cal Poly		–		3	–	8
Charleston Southern		–		3	–	8
Saint Mary's		–		2	–	8
Rankings from The Sports Network poll

== Conference champions ==
Conference Champions

Atlantic 10 Conference – Richmond
Big Sky Conference – Montana
Gateway Football Conference – Western Illinois
Ivy League – Penn
Metro Atlantic Athletic Conference – Fairfield and Georgetown
Mid-Eastern Athletic Conference – Florida A&M and Hampton
Northeast Conference – Monmouth and Robert Morris
Ohio Valley Conference – Tennessee State
Patriot League – Lehigh
Pioneer Football League – Drake
Southern Conference – Georgia Southern
Southland Football League – Northwestern State
Southwestern Athletic Conference – Southern

== Postseason ==
=== NCAA Division I-AA playoff bracket ===
First Round; November 28; Campus sites
1	Georgia Southern*	49
16	Colgate	28
8	Connecticut*	42
9	Hampton	34
5	Florida A&M*	27
12	Troy State	17
4	Western Illinois*	52
13	Montana	9
3	Richmond*	23
14	Lehigh	24
6	McNeese State*	19
11	UMass	21
7	Appalachian State*	45
10	Tennessee State	31
2	Northwestern State*	48
15	Illinois State	28

Quarterfinals; December 4–5; Campus sites
1	Georgia Southern*	52
8	Connecticut	30
5	Florida A&M	21
4	Western Illinois*	24
14	Lehigh	21
11	UMass*	27
7	Appalachian State	20
2	Northwestern State*	31

Semifinals; December 12; Campus sites
1	Georgia Southern*	42
4	Western Illinois	14
11	UMass	41
2	Northwestern State*	31

National Championship Game; December 19; Finley Stadium; Chattanooga, TN
1	Georgia Southern	43
11	UMass	55

* Denotes host institution
