= 1998 NCAA Division I-AA football rankings =

- Season: 1998
- Postseason: Single-elimination
- Preseason No. 1: Youngstown State
- National champions: UMass
- Conference with most teams in final poll: A-10 (5)

The 1998 NCAA Division I-AA football rankings are from the Sports Network poll of Division I-AA head coaches, athletic directors, sports information directors and media members. This is for the 1998 season.

== Legend ==
| | Increase in ranking |
| | Decrease in ranking |
| | Not ranked previous week |
| (#–#) | Win–loss record |
| (Italics) | Number of first place votes |
| т | Tied with team above or below also with this symbol |

== The Sports Network poll ==
| | Preseason | Week 1 Sept 8 | Week 2 Sept 15 | Week 3 Sept 22 | Week 4 Sept 29 | Week 5 Oct 6 | Week 6 Oct 13 | Week 7 Oct 20 | Week 8 Oct 27 | Week 9 Nov 3 | Week 10 Nov 10 | Week 11 Nov 17 | Week 12 Nov 24 | Week 13 Postseason | |
|---|---|---|---|---|---|---|---|---|---|---|---|---|---|---|---|
| 1. | Youngstown State | Youngstown State (1–0) (63) | Youngstown State (2–0) (69) | Youngstown State (3–0) (58) | Youngstown State (3–0) (56) | McNeese State (4–0) (87) | McNeese State (5–0) (85) | Georgia Southern (7–0) (88) | Georgia Southern (8–0) (93) | Georgia Southern (9–0) (95) | Georgia Southern (10–0) (95) | Georgia Southern (11–0) (97) | Georgia Southern (11–0) (84) | UMass (12–3) (63) | 1. |
| 2. | McNeese State | McNeese State (1–0) (17) | McNeese State (2–0) (22) | McNeese State (3–0) (33) | McNeese State (4–0) (36) | Georgia Southern (5–0) (8) | Georgia Southern (6–0) (9) | Hampton (6–0) (1) | Hampton (7–0) (1) | Western Illinois (8–1) (2) | Western Illinois (9–1) (2) | McNeese State (9–1) | Northwestern State (9–2) | Georgia Southern (13–1) | 2. |
| 3. | Delaware | Montana (1–0) (3) | Georgia Southern (2–0) (1) | Georgia Southern (3–0) (1) | Georgia Southern (4–0) (1) | Hampton (4–0) | Appalachian State (5–0) | Western Illinois (6–1) (1) | Western Illinois (7–1) (2) | McNeese State (7–1) | McNeese State (8–1) | Appalachian State (9–1) | Florida A&M (10–1) | Northwestern State (11–3) | 3. |
| 4. | Montana | Delaware (1–0) (1) | Villanova (1–1) | Villanova (2–1) | Villanova (3–1) (1) | Appalachian State (4–0) | Hampton (5–0) | Northwestern State (5–1) (2) | Northwestern State (6–1) (1) | Appalachian State (7–1) | Appalachian State (8–1) | Florida A&M (9–1) | Western Illinois (9–2) | Western Illinois (11–3) | 4. |
| 5. | Northern Iowa | Northern Iowa (1–0) | Hampton (2–0) | Hampton (3–0) | Hampton (4–0) | Western Illinois (4–1) | Western Illinois (5–1) | McNeese State (5–1) (1) | McNeese State (6–1) | Connecticut (7–1) | Florida A&M (8–1) | Northwestern State (8–2) | Richmond (9–2) | Florida A&M (11–2) | 5. |
| 6. | Georgia Southern | Georgia Southern (1–0) | Northern Iowa (1–1) | Hofstra (3–0) | Hofstra (3–0) | Delaware (4–1) | Youngstown State (4–1) | William & Mary (6–1) | Appalachian State (6–1) | Florida A&M (7–1) | William & Mary (7–2) | Western Illinois (9–2) | McNeese State (9–2) | Appalachian State (10–3) | 6. |
| 7. | Villanova | Western Kentucky (1–0) | Hofstra (2–0) | William & Mary (3–0) | Northwestern State (4–0) | Youngstown State (3–1) | William & Mary (5–1) | Appalachian State (5–1) | Florida A&M (6–1) | William & Mary (7–2) | Northwestern State (7–2) | UMass (8–2) | Appalachian State (9–2) | Lehigh (12–1) | 7. |
| 8. | Western Kentucky | Villanova (0–1) | William & Mary (2–0) | Northwestern State (3–0) | Delaware (3–1) | Eastern Kentucky (3–1) | Northwestern State (4–1) | Florida A&M (6–1) | Delaware (5–2) | Hampton (7–1) | Murray State (7–2) | Richmond (8–2) | Connecticut (9–2) | McNeese State (9–3) | 8. |
| 9. | Eastern Kentucky | Eastern Kentucky (1–0) | Delaware (1–1) | Delaware (2–1) | Eastern Kentucky (3–1) | Weber State (5–0) | Florida A&M (5–1) | Delaware (5–2) | Connecticut (6–1) | Northwestern State (6–2) | Troy State (7–2) | Connecticut (8–2) | Hampton (9–2) | Connecticut (10–3) | 9. |
| 10. | Hampton | Hampton (1–0) | Northwestern State (2–0) | Murray State (3–0) | Appalachian State (3–0) | Northwestern State (4–1) | Delaware (4–2) | Connecticut (5–1) | Youngstown State (5–2) | Murray State (6–2) | UMass (7–2) | Hampton (8–2) | Tennessee State (9–2) | Richmond (9–3) | 10. |
| 11. | East Tennessee State | Western Illinois (1–0) | Montana (1–1) | Montana (2–1) | Western Illinois (3–1) | Villanova (3–2) | Troy State (4–1) | Youngstown State (4–2) | Western Kentucky (5–2) | Troy State (6–2) | Delaware (6–3) | Tennessee State (8–2) | Troy State (8–3) | Hampton (9–3) | 11. |
| 12. | Southern | Hofstra (1–0) | Murray State (2–0) | Eastern Kentucky (2–1) | Weber State (4–0) | William & Mary (4–1) | South Florida (5–0) | Western Kentucky (4–2) | William & Mary (6–2) | UMass (6–2) | Richmond (7–2) | William & Mary (7–3) | UMass (8–3) | Tennessee State (9–3) | 12. |
| 13. | Western Illinois | William & Mary (1–0) | Northern Arizona (2–0) | Appalachian State (2–0) | William & Mary (3–1) | Murray State (4–1) | Weber State (5–1) | Murray State (5–2) | Murray State (5–2) | Southern (6–2) | Connecticut (7–2) | Western Kentucky (7–3) | Lehigh (11–0) | Troy State (8–4) | 13. |
| 14. | William & Mary | Northwestern State (1–0) | Appalachian State (2–0) | Western Illinois (2–1) | Murray State (3–1) | Hofstra (3–1) | Eastern Illinois (4–1) | South Florida (5–1) | Southern (6–2) | Montana State (6–2) | Hampton (7–2) | Troy State (7–3) | Montana (8–3) | Southern (8–3) | 14. |
| 15. | Hofstra | Northern Arizona (1–0) | Western Kentucky (1–1) | Southern (2–1) | Southern (3–1) | Southern (4–1) | Connecticut (4–1) | Southern (5–2) | Troy State (5–2) | Delaware (5–3) | Western Kentucky (6–3) | Murray State (7–3) | Southern (7–3) | Montana (8–4) | 15. |
| 16. | Northwestern State | Murray State (1–0) | Eastern Kentucky (1–1) | Florida A&M (2–1) | Florida A&M (3–1) | Florida A&M (4–1) | Cal State Northridge (4–1) | Troy State (4–2) | UMass (5–2) | Richmond (6–2) | Tennessee State (7–2) | Southern (7–3) | William & Mary (7–4) | Illinois State (8–4) | 16. |
| 17. | Florida A&M | Appalachian State (1–0) | Western Illinois (1–1) | Northern Iowa (1–2) | Northern Iowa (2–2) | Troy State (4–1) | Eastern Kentucky (3–2) | Weber State (5–2) | Hofstra (5–2) | Youngstown State (5–3) | Southern (6–3) | Lehigh (10–0) | Western Kentucky (7–4) | William & Mary (7–4) | 17. |
| 18. | Jackson State | Middle Tennessee (1–0) | Southern (1–1) | Connecticut (2–0) | Connecticut (3–0) | Montana (3–2) | UMass (4–1) | Illinois State (5–1) | Eastern Illinois (5–2) | Western Kentucky (5–3) | Bethune-Cookman (7–1) | Bethune-Cookman (8–1) | Hofstra (8–3) | Bethune-Cookman (8–2) | 18. |
| 19. | Northern Arizona | East Tennessee State (0–1) | Florida A&M (1–1) | Northern Arizona (2–1) | Troy State (3–1) | South Florida (4–0) | Western Kentucky (3–2) | UMass (4–2) | Richmond (6–2) | Tennessee State (6–2) | South Florida (7–2) | Montana State (7–3) | South Florida (8–3) | Western Kentucky (7–4) | 19. |
| 20. | Richmond | Howard (1–0) | Middle Tennessee (1–1) | Troy State (2–1) | Northern Arizona (3–1) | Western Kentucky (3–2) т | Montana State (4–1) | Hofstra (4–2) | South Florida (5–2) | South Florida (6–2) | Lehigh (9–0) | Montana (7–2) | Bethune-Cookman (8–2) | Hofstra (8–3) | 20. |
| 21. | Eastern Washington | Southern (0–1) | Connecticut (1–0) | Weber State(3–0) | Montana (2–2) | Furman (4–1) т | Murray State (4–2) | Eastern Illinois (4–2) | Montana State (5–2) | Illinois State (6–2) | Montana State (6–3) | South Florida (7–3) | Illinois State (8–3) | Colgate (9–3) | 21. |
| 22. | Middle Tennessee | Eastern Illinois (1–0) | Southern Utah (1–0) | Howard (2–1) | Western Kentucky (2–2) | Eastern Illinois (4–1) | Villanova (3–3) | Villanova (3–3) | Jacksonville State (6–2) | Jacksonville State (6–2) | Montana (6–3) | Hofstra (7–3) | Delaware (7–4) | South Florida (8–3) | 22. |
| 23. | Murray State | Troy State (1–0) | Howard (1–1) | South Florida (3–0) | South Florida (3–0) | Cal State Northridge (3–1) | Southern (4–2) | Richmond (5–2) | Weber State (5–3) | Lehigh (8–0) | Hofstra (6–3) | Delaware (6–4) | Murray State (7–4) | Delaware (7–4) | 23. |
| 24. | Eastern Illinois | Connecticut (1–0) | Stephen F. Austin (1–1) | Western Kentucky (1–2) | Eastern Illinois (3–1) | UMass (3–1) | Furman (4–2) | Cal State Northridge (4–2) | Illinois State (5–2) | Montana (6–3) | Jacksonville State (6–3) | Jacksonville State (7–3) | Montana State (7–4) | Murray State (7–4) | 24. |
| 25. | Liberty | Florida A&M (0–1) | Troy State (1–1) | Eastern Illinois (2–1) | Furman (3–1) | Connecticut (3–1) | Hofstra (3–2) | Eastern Kentucky (3–3) | Lehigh (7–0) | Hofstra (5–3) | Cal State Northridge (6–3) | Cal State Northridge (7–3) | Northern Iowa (7–4) | Montana State (7–4) | 25. |
| | Preseason | Week 1 Sept 8 | Week 2 Sept 15 | Week 3 Sept 22 | Week 4 Sept 29 | Week 5 Oct 6 | Week 6 Oct 13 | Week 7 Oct 20 | Week 8 Oct 27 | Week 9 Nov 3 | Week 10 Nov 10 | Week 11 Nov 17 | Week 12 Nov 24 | Week 13 Postseason | |
| | | Dropped: 18 Jackson State; 20 Richmond; 21 Eastern Washington; 25 Liberty | Dropped: 19 East Tennessee State; 22 Eastern Illinois | Dropped: 20 Middle Tennessee; 22 Southern Utah; 24 Stephen F. Austin | Dropped: 22 Howard | Dropped: 17 Northern Iowa; 20 Northern Arizona | Dropped: 18 Montana | Dropped: 20 Montana State; 24 Furman | Dropped: 22 Villanova; 24 Cal State Northridge; 25 Eastern Kentucky | Dropped: 18 Eastern Illinois; 23 Weber State | Dropped: 17 Youngstown State; 21 Illinois State | None | Dropped: 24 Jacksonville State; 25 Cal State Northridge | Dropped: 20 Northern Iowa | |
