= 1998 Davidson Wildcats football team =

American college football season

1998 Davidson Wildcats football
- Conference: Independent
- Record: 8–2
- Head coach: Tim Landis (6th season)
- Home stadium: Richardson Stadium

1998 NCAA Division I-AA independents football standings
	Conf.			Overall
Team	W		L	W		L
Morehead State		–		9	–	2
Davidson		–		8	–	2
No. 20 Hofstra		–		8	–	3
No. 22 South Florida		–		8	–	3
No. 19 Western Kentucky		–		7	–	4
Samford		–		6	–	5
Liberty		–		5	–	6
Southern Utah		–		5	–	6
Austin Peay		–		4	–	7
Buffalo		–		4	–	7
Jacksonville		–		4	–	5
La Salle		–		3	–	6
Cal Poly		–		3	–	8
Charleston Southern		–		3	–	8
Saint Mary's		–		2	–	8
Rankings from The Sports Network poll

The 1998 Davidson Wildcats football team was an American football team that represented Davidson College as an independent during the 1998 NCAA Division I-AA football season. Led by sixth-year head coach Tim Landis, the team compiled a 8–2 record.

== Schedule ==
Date	Opponent	Site	Result	Attendance	Source
September 12	at Jacksonville	D. B. Milne Field; Jacksonville, FL	L 14–19	4,890	
September 19	at Sewanee	McGee Field; Sewanee, TN	W 16–9 ^{OT}		
September 26	Emory and Henry^{†}	Richardson Stadium; Davidson, NC	L 24–27	2,027	
October 3	Guilford	Richardson Stadium; Davidson, NC	W 24–7	2,446	
October 10	Washington and Lee	Richardson Stadium; Davidson, NC	W 29–7		
October 17	at Methodist	Monarch Stadium; Fayetteville, NC	W 26–0	423	
October 24	Randolph–Macon	Richardson Stadium; Davidson, NC	W 30–16		
October 31	at Hampden–Sydney	Hundley Stadium; Hampden Sydney, VA	W 23–7		
November 7	Centre	Richardson Stadium; Davidson, NC	W 21–6		
November 14	at Bridgewater	Jopson Athletic Complex; Bridgewater, VA	W 14–6		
^{†}Homecoming
