= 1998 VMI Keydets football team =

American college football season

1998 VMI Keydets football
- Conference: Southern Conference
- Record: 1–10 (0–8 SoCon)
- Head coach: Ted Cain (2nd season; first 10 games); Donny White (interim, last game)
- Home stadium: Alumni Memorial Field

1998 Southern Conference football standings
	Conf.			Overall
Team	W		L	W		L
No. 2 Georgia Southern $^	8	–	0	14	–	1
No. 6 Appalachian State ^	6	–	2	10	–	3
Western Carolina	5	–	3	6	–	5
Chattanooga	4	–	4	5	–	6
The Citadel	4	–	4	5	–	6
East Tennessee State	3	–	5	4	–	7
Wofford	3	–	5	4	–	7
Furman	3	–	5	5	–	6
VMI	0	–	8	1	–	10
$ – Conference champion; ^ – NCAA Division I-AA playoff participant; Rankings from The Sports Network I-AA Poll

The 1998 VMI Keydets football team represented the Virginia Military Institute (VMI) as a member of the Southern Conference (SOCON) during the 1998 NCAA Division I-AA football season. It was the Keydets' 108th year of football and second season under head coach Ted Cain, who was replaced by interim head coach Donny White after a 1–9 start. VMI ended the season 1–10 with its sole victory over Lenoir–Rhyne.

== Schedule ==
Date	Time	Opponent	Site	TV	Result	Attendance	Source
September 5	1:00 pm	Lenoir–Rhyne*	Alumni Memorial Field; Lexington, VA		W 26–7	4,960	
September 12	1:00 pm	at No. 17 William & Mary*	Zable Stadium; Williamsburg, VA		L 0–49	9,598	
September 19	7:00 pm	at East Tennessee State	Memorial Center; Johnson City, TN		L 8–44	5,071	
September 26	1:00 pm	Furman	Alumni Memorial Field; Lexington, VA		L 14–51	6,298	
October 3	1:00 pm	at No. 2 Georgia Southern	Paulson Stadium; Statesboro, GA		L 7–63	9,687	
October 10	12:30 pm	Wofford^{†}	Alumni Memorial Field; Lexington, VA	SSN	L 20–42	6,541	
October 17	7:00 pm	at Chattanooga	Finley Stadium; Chattanooga, TN		L 7–45	10,329	
October 24	1:00 pm	Morehead State*	Alumni Memorial Field; Lexington, VA		L 38–41	4,173	
October 31	1:00 pm	Western Carolina	Alumni Memorial Field; Lexington, VA		L 17–39	3,714	
November 7	2:00 pm	at No. 3 Appalachian State	Kidd Brewer Stadium; Boone, NC		L 0–51	18,393	
November 14	12:30 pm	The Citadel	Alumni Memorial Field; Lexington, VA (Military Classic of the South)	SSN	L 10–36	8,832	
*Non-conference game; ^{†}Homecoming; Rankings from The Sports Network Poll released prior to the game; All times are in Eastern time
