= 1998 Cal Poly Mustangs football team =

American college football season

1998 Cal Poly Mustangs football
- Conference: Independent
- Record: 3–8
- Head coach: Larry Welsh (2nd season)
- Home stadium: Mustang Stadium

1998 NCAA Division I-AA independents football standings
	Conf.			Overall
Team	W		L	W		L
Morehead State		–		9	–	2
Davidson		–		8	–	2
No. 20 Hofstra		–		8	–	3
No. 22 South Florida		–		8	–	3
No. 19 Western Kentucky		–		7	–	4
Samford		–		6	–	5
Liberty		–		5	–	6
Southern Utah		–		5	–	6
Austin Peay		–		4	–	7
Buffalo		–		4	–	7
Jacksonville		–		4	–	5
La Salle		–		3	–	6
Cal Poly		–		3	–	8
Charleston Southern		–		3	–	8
Saint Mary's		–		2	–	8
Rankings from The Sports Network poll

The 1998 Cal Poly Mustangs football team represented California Polytechnic State University, San Luis Obispo as an independent during the 1998 NCAA Division I-AA football season. Led by second-year head coach Larry Welsh, Cal Poly compiled a record of 3–8. The team was outscored by its opponents 299 to 226 for the season. The Mustangs played home games at Mustang Stadium in San Luis Obispo, California.

== Schedule ==
Date	Time	Opponent	Site	Result	Attendance	Source
September 5		Northern Arizona	Mustang Stadium; San Luis Obispo, CA	L 0–9		
September 12		at Sacramento State	Hornet Stadium; Sacramento, CA	L 14–22	5,011	
September 19		at No. 11 Montana	Washington–Grizzly Stadium; Missoula, MT	L 14–37	17,325	
September 26		Saint Mary's	Mustang Stadium; San Luis Obispo, CA	W 35–13		
October 3		No. 7 (D-II) UC Davis	Mustang Stadium; San Luis Obispo, CA (rivalry)	L 24–34		
October 17	11:30 a.m.	at Northern Iowa	UNI-Dome; Cedar Falls, IA	L 7–31	13,117	
October 24		Western New Mexico	Mustang Stadium; San Luis Obispo, CA	W 36–17		
October 31		at Portland State	Civic Stadium; Portland, OR	L 34–41	5,337	
November 7		at Southern Utah	Eccles Coliseum; Cedar City, UT	L 17–27		
November 14		at Nevada	Mackay Stadium; Reno, NV	L 0–63	16,828	
November 21		Liberty	Mustang Stadium; San Luis Obispo, CA	W 45–35		
Rankings from The Sports Network Poll released prior to the game; All times are in Pacific time
