= 1998 Northwest Missouri State Bearcats football team =

American college football season

1998 Northwest Missouri State Bearcats football

NCAA Division II champion MIAA champion

NCAA Division II Championship Game, W 24–6 vs. Carson–Newman
- Conference: Mid-America Intercollegiate Athletics Association
- Record: 15–0 (9–0 MIAA)
- Head coach: Mel Tjeerdsma (5th season)
- Defensive coordinator: Scott Bostwick (5th season)
- Home stadium: Bearcat Stadium

1998 Mid-America Intercollegiate Athletics Association football standings
	Conf.			Overall
Team	W		L	W		L
No. 2 NW Missouri State $^	9	–	0	15	–	0
No. 10 Emporia State	7	–	2	9	–	2
Central Missouri State	6	–	3	8	–	3
Pittsburg State	6	–	3	7	–	3
Truman State	6	–	3	6	–	5
Missouri Western	3	–	6	5	–	6
Washburn	3	–	6	4	–	6
Missouri Southern	3	–	6	3	–	7
Southwest Baptist	2	–	7	3	–	8
Missouri–Rolla	0	–	9	0	–	11
$ – Conference champion; ^ – NCAA Division II playoff participant; Rankings from NCAA Division II Football Committee poll

The 1998 Northwest Missouri State Bearcats football team represented Northwest Missouri State University during the 1998 NCAA Division II football season. The team was led by fifth-year head coach Mel Tjeerdsma played their home games at Bearcat Stadium in Maryville, Missouri, which has been the Bearcat's home stadium since 1917. Northwest Missouri State team finished the season with and 15–0 record and won their first NCAA Division II Football Championship with a win over Carson–Newman in the title game.

== Schedule ==
Date	Opponent	Rank	Site	TV	Result
September 5	Midwestern State*	No. 9	Bearcat Stadium; Maryville, MO		W 55–16
September 12	Wayne State (NE)*	No. 9	Bearcat Stadium; Maryville, MO		W 51–2
September 17	at Missouri Southern	No. 9	Fred G. Hughes Stadium; Joplin, MO		W 48–21
September 26	Missouri Western	No. 6	Bearcat Stadium; Maryville, MO (rivalry)		W 45–32
October 3	at Washburn	No. 4	Moore Bowl; Topeka, KS		W 38–31
October 10	Missouri–Rolla	No. 4	Bearcat Stadium; Maryville, MO		W 49–6
October 17	at Southwest Baptist	No. 3	Plaster Stadium; Bolivar, MO		W 57–12
October 24	Pittsburg State	No. 4	Bearcat Stadium; Maryville, MO (rivalry)		W 23–18
October 31	at Central Missouri State	No. 2	Bearcat Stadium; Warrensburg, MO		W 34–20
November 7	at Truman State	No. 2	Stokes Stadium; Kirksville, MO (rivalry)		W 41–7
November 14	No. 10 Emporia State	No. 2	Bearcat Stadium; Maryville, MO		W 69–33
November 21	No. 16 Nebraska–Omaha*	No. 2	Bearcat Stadium; Maryville, MO (NCAA Division II First Round)		W 28–14
November 28	No. 6 Northern Colorado*	No. 2	Bearcat Stadium; Maryville, MO (Division II Quarterfinal)		W 42–17
December 5	No. 11 Texas A&M–Kingsville*	No. 2	Bearcat Stadium; Maryville, MO (NCAA Division II Semifinal)		W 49–34
December 12	No. 3 Carson–Newman*	No. 2	Braly Municipal Stadium; Florence, AL (NCAA Division II Championship)	ESPN2	W 24–6
*Non-conference game; Rankings from NCAA Division II Football Committee Poll released prior to the game
