= 1998 Buffalo Bulls football team =

American college football season

1998 Buffalo Bulls football
- Conference: Independent
- Record: 4–7
- Head coach: Craig Cirbus (4th season)
- Defensive coordinator: Joe Reich (2nd season)
- Captains: Mike Garofalo; Kali Watkins; Dan Poulsen
- Home stadium: University at Buffalo Stadium

1998 NCAA Division I-AA independents football standings
	Conf.			Overall
Team	W		L	W		L
Morehead State		–		9	–	2
Davidson		–		8	–	2
No. 20 Hofstra		–		8	–	3
No. 22 South Florida		–		8	–	3
No. 19 Western Kentucky		–		7	–	4
Samford		–		6	–	5
Liberty		–		5	–	6
Southern Utah		–		5	–	6
Austin Peay		–		4	–	7
Buffalo		–		4	–	7
Jacksonville		–		4	–	5
La Salle		–		3	–	6
Cal Poly		–		3	–	8
Charleston Southern		–		3	–	8
Saint Mary's		–		2	–	8
Rankings from The Sports Network poll

The 1998 Buffalo Bulls football team represented the University at Buffalo as an independent during the 1998 NCAA Division I-AA football season. Led by fourth-year head coach Craig Cirbus, the Bulls compiled a record of 4–7. The team played home games at the University at Buffalo Stadium in Amherst, New York.

== Schedule ==
Date	Time	Opponent	Site	TV	Result	Attendance	Source
September 3	7:00 pm	at Maine	Fitzpatrick Stadium; Portland, ME		L 13–30	4,998	
September 12	7:00 pm	Lock Haven	University at Buffalo Stadium; Amherst, NY		W 40–17	20,760	
September 19	1:00 pm	at Lafayette	Fisher Field; Easton, PA		W 16–14	3,834	
September 26	1:00 pm	at UMass	Warren McGuirk Alumni Stadium; Hadley, MA (rivalry)		L 27–51	11,672	
October 3	12:00 pm	at Cornell	Schoellkopf Field; Ithaca, NY	ESN	L 31–34	7,692	
October 10	1:30 pm	Morgan State^{†}	University at Buffalo Stadium; Amherst, NY		W 35–17	19,854	
October 17	7:00 pm	Canisius	University at Buffalo Stadium; Amherst, NY		W 47–0	20,079	
October 24	1:30 pm	at Liberty	Williams Stadium; Lynchburg, VA		L 24–27	10,831	
October 31	1:30 pm	No. 3 Western Illinois	University at Buffalo Stadium; Amherst, NY		L 6–41	18,648	
November 14	3:30 pm	at Villanova	Villanova Stadium; Villanova, PA		L 40–65	6,121	
November 21	12:00 pm	at No. 22 Hofstra	Hofstra Stadium; Hempstead, NY		L 36–44	4,639	
^{†}Homecoming; Rankings from The Sports Network Poll released prior to the game; All times are in Eastern time
