= 1998 Howard Bison football team =

American college football season

1998 Howard Bison football
- Conference: Mid-Eastern Athletic Conference
- Record: 7–4 (5–3 MEAC)
- Head coach: Steve Wilson (10th season)
- Home stadium: William H. Greene Stadium; RFK Stadium

1998 Mid-Eastern Athletic Conference football standings
	Conf.			Overall
Team	W		L	W		L
No. 5 Florida A&M +^	7	–	1	11	–	2
No. 11 Hampton +^	7	–	1	9	–	3
No. 18 Bethune–Cookman	6	–	2	8	–	3
North Carolina A&T	5	–	3	8	–	3
Howard	5	–	3	7	–	4
South Carolina State	3	–	5	5	–	6
Norfolk State	2	–	6	2	–	9
Morgan State	1	–	7	1	–	10
Delaware State	0	–	8	0	–	11
+ – Conference co-champions; ^ – NCAA Division I-AA playoff participant; Rankings from The Sports Network poll

The 1998 Howard Bison football team represented Howard University as a member of the Mid-Eastern Athletic Conference (MEAC) during the 1998 NCAA Division I-AA football season. Led by 10th-year head coach Steve Wilson, the Bison compiled an overall record of 7–4, with a conference record of 5–3, and finished tied for fourth in the MEAC.

== Schedule ==
Date	Opponent	Rank	Site	Result	Attendance	Source
September 5	Jackson State*		William H. Greene Stadium; Washington, DC	W 34–8	8,891	
September 12	No. 10 Hampton	No. 20	RFK Stadium; Washington, DC (rivalry)	L 31–38	21,014	
September 19	vs. Arkansas–Pine Bluff*		Trans World Dome; St. Louis, MO (Gateway Classic)	W 21–20	37,420	
September 26	at Texas Southern*		Rice Stadium; Houston, TX	L 7–30		
October 3	vs. Bethune–Cookman		RCA Dome; Indianapolis, IN (Circle City Classic)	W 32–25	52,672	
October 17	vs. No. 9 Florida A&M		Alltel Stadium; Jacksonville, FL (Orange Blossom Classic)	L 41–69		
October 26	North Carolina A&T		William H. Greene Stadium; Washington, DC	L 6–17		
October 31	Norfolk State		William H. Greene Stadium; Washington, DC	W 54–20	16,889	
November 7	at South Carolina State		Oliver C. Dawson Stadium; Orangeburg, SC	W 32–31	6,225	
November 14	Morgan State		William H. Greene Stadium; Washington, DC (rivalry)	W 69–3	6,903	
November 21	Delaware State		William H. Greene Stadium; Washington, DC	W 46–43		
*Non-conference game; Rankings from The Sports Network Poll released prior to the game
