= 1998 Chattanooga Mocs football team =

American college football season

1998 Chattanooga Mocs football
- Conference: Southern Conference
- Record: 5–6 (4–4 SoCon)
- Head coach: Buddy Green (5th season)
- Offensive coordinator: Donnie Kirkpatrick (1st season)
- Captains: Brent Cates; Brian Hampton; Mark Hill; Kenny Sanders
- Home stadium: Finley Stadium

1998 Southern Conference football standings
	Conf.			Overall
Team	W		L	W		L
No. 2 Georgia Southern $^	8	–	0	14	–	1
No. 6 Appalachian State ^	6	–	2	10	–	3
Western Carolina	5	–	3	6	–	5
Chattanooga	4	–	4	5	–	6
The Citadel	4	–	4	5	–	6
East Tennessee State	3	–	5	4	–	7
Wofford	3	–	5	4	–	7
Furman	3	–	5	5	–	6
VMI	0	–	8	1	–	10
$ – Conference champion; ^ – NCAA Division I-AA playoff participant; Rankings from The Sports Network I-AA Poll

The 1998 Chattanooga Mocs football team represented the University of Tennessee at Chattanooga as a member of the Southern Conference (SoCon) in the 1998 NCAA Division I-AA football season. The Mocs were led by fifth-year head coach Buddy Green and played their home games at Finley Stadium. They finished the season 5–6 overall and 4–4 in SoCon play to tie for fourth place.

== Schedule ==
Date	Time	Opponent	Site	Result	Attendance	Source
September 3	7:00 pm	Samford*	Finley Stadium; Chattanooga, TN	W 23–13	9,778	
September 12	4:00 pm	at East Carolina*	Dowdy–Ficklen Stadium; Greenville, NC	L 0–31	34,028	
September 19	3:30 pm	No. 25 Troy State*	Finley Stadium; Chattanooga, TN	L 6–23	7,618	
September 26	12:00 pm	No. 3 Georgia Southern	Finley Stadium; Chattanooga, TN	L 25–42	6,574	
October 3	2:00 pm	at Wofford	Gibbs Stadium; Spartanburg, SC	W 31–3	6,791	
October 17	7:00 pm	VMI^{†}	Finley Stadium; Chattanooga, TN	W 45–7	10,329	
October 24	1:00 pm	at Western Carolina	Whitmire Stadium; Cullowhee, NC	L 21–24	7,747	
October 31	1:30 pm	No. 4 Appalachian State	Finley Stadium; Chattanooga, TN	L 7–28	5,231	
November 7	2:00 pm	at The Citadel	Johnson Hagood Stadium; Charleston, SC	W 13–10	16,842	
November 14	1:30 pm	East Tennessee State	Finley Stadium; Chattanooga, TN	W 10–7	4,320	
November 21	1:30 pm	at Furman	Paladin Stadium; Greenville, SC	L 28–31	6,215	
*Non-conference game; ^{†}Homecoming; Rankings from The Sports Network Poll released prior to the game; All times are in Eastern time
