= Donny White =

American college athletics administrator and coach

Biographical details
- Born: November 7, 1942
- Died: August 17, 2021 (aged 78)

Playing career

Football
- 1961–1964: VMI

Baseball
- 1963–1965: VMI
- Position: Shortstop (baseball)

Coaching career (HC unless noted)

Football
- 1998: VMI (interim HC)

Baseball
- 1982–1987: VMI

Administrative career (AD unless noted)
- 1998–2013: VMI

Head coaching record
- Overall: 0–1 (football); 85–136–1 (baseball)

Donny White (November 7, 1942 - August 17, 2021) was an American college athletics administrator and coach. He was the athletic director at the Virginia Military Institute (VMI), a position he held since 1998. White announced his retirement on May 13, 2013. He had also been active as a coach at the school, and had been a cadet-athlete at VMI.

== Playing career ==
White played college football and college baseball at Virginia Military Institute (VMI) located in Lexington, Virginia. He co-captained the 1964 football team and was selected All-Southern Conference in baseball for three consecutive years as a shortstop. He was inducted into the VMI Sports Hall of Fame in 1975.

== Coaching career ==
=== Baseball ===
White was named the head baseball coach at VMI in 1982 and led the program for six years. In 1982, he was named Southern Conference Co-Coach of the Year for his efforts with the program.

=== Football ===
White was the interim head football coach for the final game of the 1998 season, finishing out the season after previous head coach Ted Cain was relieved of his duties after a 1–9 start for the season,
