= 1998 Norfolk State Spartans football team =

American college football season

1998 Norfolk State Spartans football
- Conference: Mid-Eastern Athletic Conference
- Record: 2–9 (2–6 MEAC)
- Head coach: Darnell Moore (5th season)
- Home stadium: William "Dick" Price Stadium

1998 Mid-Eastern Athletic Conference football standings
	Conf.			Overall
Team	W		L	W		L
No. 5 Florida A&M +^	7	–	1	11	–	2
No. 11 Hampton +^	7	–	1	9	–	3
No. 18 Bethune–Cookman	6	–	2	8	–	3
North Carolina A&T	5	–	3	8	–	3
Howard	5	–	3	7	–	4
South Carolina State	3	–	5	5	–	6
Norfolk State	2	–	6	2	–	9
Morgan State	1	–	7	1	–	10
Delaware State	0	–	8	0	–	11
+ – Conference co-champions; ^ – NCAA Division I-AA playoff participant; Rankings from The Sports Network poll

The 1998 Norfolk State Spartans football team represented Norfolk State University as a member of the Mid-Eastern Athletic Conference (MEAC) during the 1998 NCAA Division I-AA football season. Led by fifth-year head coach Darnell Moore, the Spartans compiled an overall record of 2–9, with a conference record of 2–6, and finished seventh in the MEAC.

== Schedule ==
Date	Opponent	Site	Result	Attendance	Source
September 5	Virginia State*	William "Dick" Price Stadium; Norfolk, VA	L 22–30	24,041	
September 12	No. 25 Florida A&M	William "Dick" Price Stadium; Norfolk, VA	L 14–84		
September 19	Delaware State	William "Dick" Price Stadium; Norfolk, VA	W 38–26		
September 26	at Morgan State	Hughes Stadium; Baltimore, MD	W 46–43 ^{OT}		
October 3	at North Carolina A&T	Aggie Stadium; Greensboro, NC	L 20–34	10,784	
October 10	South Carolina State	William "Dick" Price Stadium; Norfolk, VA	L 26–43		
October 17	at No. 4 Hampton	Armstrong Stadium; Hampton, VA (rivalry)	L 14–59	13,832	
October 24	Virginia Union*^{†}	William "Dick" Price Stadium; Norfolk, VA	L 8–17		
October 31	at Howard	William H. Greene Stadium; Washington, DC	L 20–54	16,889	
November 7	at Liberty*	Williams Stadium; Lynchburg, VA	L 12–45	7,321	
November 14	at No. 18 Bethune–Cookman	Municipal Stadium; Daytona Beach, FL	L 38–59		
*Non-conference game; ^{†}Homecoming; Rankings from The Sports Network Poll released prior to the game
