= 1998 Florida A&M Rattlers football team =

American college football season

1998 Florida A&M Rattlers football

Black college national champion MEAC co-champion

NCAA Division I-AA First Round, L 21–24 vs. Western Illinois
- Conference: Mid-Eastern Athletic Conference

Ranking
- Sports Network: No. 5
- Record: 11–2 (7–1 MEAC)
- Head coach: Billy Joe (5th season)
- Offensive scheme: Gulf Coast
- Home stadium: Bragg Memorial Stadium

1998 Mid-Eastern Athletic Conference football standings
| | Conf. | | | Overall |
| Team | W | | L | W | | L |
|---|---|---|---|---|---|---|
| No. 5 Florida A&M +^ | 7 | – | 1 | 11 | – | 2 |
| No. 11 Hampton +^ | 7 | – | 1 | 9 | – | 3 |
| No. 18 Bethune–Cookman | 6 | – | 2 | 8 | – | 3 |
| North Carolina A&T | 5 | – | 3 | 8 | – | 3 |
| Howard | 5 | – | 3 | 7 | – | 4 |
| South Carolina State | 3 | – | 5 | 5 | – | 6 |
| Norfolk State | 2 | – | 6 | 2 | – | 9 |
| Morgan State | 1 | – | 7 | 1 | – | 10 |
| Delaware State | 0 | – | 8 | 0 | – | 11 |
+ – Conference co-champions; ^ – NCAA Division I-AA playoff participant; Rankings from The Sports Network poll

The 1998 Florida A&M Rattlers football team represented Florida A&M University as a member of the Mid-Eastern Athletic Conference (MEAC) during the 1998 NCAA Division I-AA football season. Led by fifth-year head coach Billy Joe, the Rattlers compiled an overall record of 11–2, with a mark of 7–1 in conference play, and finished as MEAC co-champion. Florida A&M finished their season with a loss against Western Illinois in the Division I-AA playoffs. At the conclusion of the season, the Rattlers were also recognized as black college national champion.

== Schedule ==
| Date | Opponent | Rank | Site | Result | Attendance | Source |
|---|---|---|---|---|---|---|
| September 5 | No. 10 Hampton | No. 17 | Bragg Memorial Stadium; Tallahassee, FL | L 14–21 | 18,805 | |
| September 12 | at Norfolk State | No. 25 | William "Dick" Price Stadium; Norfolk, VA | W 84–14 | | |
| September 19 | at Jackson State* | No. 19 | Mississippi Veterans Memorial Stadium; Jackson, MS | W 45–7 | 13,500 | |
| September 26 | vs. Tennessee State* | No. 16 | Georgia Dome; Atlanta, GA (Atlanta Football Classic) | W 31–23 | 28,987 | |
| October 3 | at Delaware State | No. 16 | Alumni Stadium; Dover, DE | W 56–21 | | |
| October 10 | North Carolina A&T | No. 16 | Bragg Memorial Stadium; Tallahassee, FL | W 51–12 | 27,043 | |
| October 17 | vs. Howard | No. 9 | Alltel Stadium; Jacksonville, FL (Orange Blossom Classic) | W 69–41 | | |
| October 31 | Morgan State | No. 7 | Bragg Memorial Stadium; Tallahassee, FL | W 59–32 | 12,122 | |
| November 7 | at Southern* | No. 6 | A. W. Mumford Stadium; Baton Rouge, LA | W 50–48 | | |
| November 14 | South Carolina State | No. 5 | Bragg Memorial Stadium; Tallahassee, FL | W 37–14 | | |
| November 21 | vs. No. 18 Bethune–Cookman | No. 4 | Florida Citrus Bowl; Orlando, FL (Florida Classic) | W 50–14 | 66,245 | |
| November 28 | No. 11 Troy State* | No. 3 | Bragg Memorial Stadium; Tallahassee, FL (NCAA Division I-AA First Round) | W 27–17 | 16,509 | |
| December 5 | at No. 4 Western Illinois* | No. 3 | Hanson Field; Macomb, IL (NCAA Division I-AA Quarterfinal) | L 21–24 | 7,400 | |
*Non-conference game; Rankings from The Sports Network Poll released prior to the game
