= 1998 The Citadel Bulldogs football team =

American college football season

1998 The Citadel Bulldogs football
- Conference: Southern Conference
- Record: 5–6 (4–4 SoCon)
- Head coach: Don Powers (3rd season)
- Offensive scheme: Option
- Home stadium: Johnson Hagood Stadium

1998 Southern Conference football standings
| | Conf. | | | Overall |
| Team | W | | L | W | | L |
|---|---|---|---|---|---|---|
| No. 2 Georgia Southern $^ | 8 | – | 0 | 14 | – | 1 |
| No. 6 Appalachian State ^ | 6 | – | 2 | 10 | – | 3 |
| Western Carolina | 5 | – | 3 | 6 | – | 5 |
| Chattanooga | 4 | – | 4 | 5 | – | 6 |
| The Citadel | 4 | – | 4 | 5 | – | 6 |
| East Tennessee State | 3 | – | 5 | 4 | – | 7 |
| Wofford | 3 | – | 5 | 4 | – | 7 |
| Furman | 3 | – | 5 | 5 | – | 6 |
| VMI | 0 | – | 8 | 1 | – | 10 |
$ – Conference champion; ^ – NCAA Division I-AA playoff participant; Rankings from The Sports Network I-AA Poll

The 1998 The Citadel Bulldogs football team represented The Citadel, The Military College of South Carolina in the 1998 NCAA Division I-AA football season. Don Powers served as head coach for the third season. The Bulldogs played as members of the Southern Conference and played home games at Johnson Hagood Stadium.

== Schedule ==
| Date | Opponent | Site | Result | Attendance | Source |
|---|---|---|---|---|---|
| September 5 | at No. 3 (I-A) Florida* | Ben Hill Griffin Stadium; Gainesville, FL | L 10–49 | 85,061 | |
| September 12 | at Wofford | Gibbs Stadium; Spartanburg, SC (rivalry) | W 20–14 | 10,271 | |
| September 19 | Western Carolina | Johnson Hagood Stadium; Charleston, SC | L 8–14 | 11,011 | |
| September 26 | at No. 13 Appalachian State | Kidd Brewer Stadium; Boone, NC | L 11–26 | 10,261 | |
| October 3 | at No. 23 South Florida* | Raymond James Stadium; Tampa, FL | L 6–45 | 32,598 | |
| October 10 | East Tennessee State | Johnson Hagood Stadium; Charleston, SC | W 31–20 | 15,707 | |
| October 17 | at No. 24 Furman | Paladin Stadium; Greenville, SC (rivalry) | W 25–24 | 13,011 | |
| October 24 | No. 1 Georgia Southern | Johnson Hagood Stadium; Charleston, SC | L 34–51 | 14,222 | |
| October 31 | No. 17 Hofstra* | Johnson Hagood Stadium; Charleston, SC | W 32–30 | 8,673 | |
| November 7 | Chattanooga^{†} | Johnson Hagood Stadium; Charleston, SC | L 10–13 | 16,842 | |
| November 14 | at VMI | Alumni Memorial Field; Lexington, VA (Military Classic of the South) | W 36–10 | 8,832 | |
*Non-conference game; ^{†}Homecoming; Rankings from The Sports Network Poll released prior to the game
