= 1998 La Salle Explorers football team =

American college football season

1998 La Salle Explorers football
- Conference: Independent
- Record: 3–6
- Head coach: Bill Manlove (2nd season)
- Home stadium: McCarthy Stadium

1998 NCAA Division I-AA independents football standings
	Conf.			Overall
Team	W		L	W		L
Morehead State		–		9	–	2
Davidson		–		8	–	2
No. 20 Hofstra		–		8	–	3
No. 22 South Florida		–		8	–	3
No. 19 Western Kentucky		–		7	–	4
Samford		–		6	–	5
Liberty		–		5	–	6
Southern Utah		–		5	–	6
Austin Peay		–		4	–	7
Buffalo		–		4	–	7
Jacksonville		–		4	–	5
La Salle		–		3	–	6
Cal Poly		–		3	–	8
Charleston Southern		–		3	–	8
Saint Mary's		–		2	–	8
Rankings from The Sports Network poll

The 1998 La Salle Explorers football team was an American football team that represented La Salle University as an independent during the 1998 NCAA Division I-AA football season. In their second year under head coach Bill Manlove, the Explorers compiled a 3–6 record.

== Schedule ==
Date	Opponent	Site	Result	Attendance	Source
September 12	Saint Peter's	McCarthy Stadium; Philadelphia, PA	W 24–21 ^{OT}		
September 19	at Iona	Mazzella Field; New Rochelle, NY	L 28–40		
September 26	at Delaware Valley	James Work Memorial Stadium; Doylestown, PA	L 0–29		
October 3	Monmouth	McCarthy Stadium; Philadelphia, PA	L 7–41		
October 10	at Catholic University	Cardinal Stadium; Washington, DC	L 14–25		
October 17	Bryant	McCarthy Stadium; Philadelphia, PA	W 38–28		
October 24	at Saint Francis (PA)	Pine Bowl; Loretto, PA	W 27–5		
October 31	Waynesburg	McCarthy Stadium; Philadelphia, PA	L 19–20		
November 7	at Jacksonville	D. B. Milne Field; Jacksonville, FL	L 14–58	2,686	
