= 1998 UC Davis Aggies football team =

American college football season

1998 UC Davis Aggies football

NCAA Division II First Round, L 21–54 vs. Texas A&M–Kingsville
- Conference: Independent
- Record: 10–2
- Head coach: Bob Biggs (6th season)
- Offensive coordinator: Mike Moroski (6th season)
- Home stadium: Toomey Field

1998 NCAA Division II independents football records
	Conf.			Overall
Team	W		L	W		L
No. 4 UC Davis ^		–		10	–	2
Saint Joseph's (IN)		–		7	–	4
New Haven		–		5	–	5
Elon		–		5	–	6
Quincy		–		4	–	6
Gannon		–		3	–	7
Oklahoma Panhandle State		–		3	–	7
Kentucky Wesleyan		–		2	–	7
Western New Mexico		–		2	–	7
^ – NCAA Division II playoff participant; Rankings from NCAA Division II Football Committee poll

The 1998 UC Davis football team represented the University of California, Davis as an independent during the 1998 NCAA Division II football season. Led by sixth-year head coach Bob Biggs, UC Davis compiled an overall record of 10–2. 1998 was the 29th consecutive winning season for the Aggies. UC Davis was ranked No. 4 in the NCAA Division II poll at the end of the regular season and, for the third straight season, advanced to the NCAA Division II Football Championship playoffs, where they were upset in the first round my 11th-ranked Texas A&M–Kingsville. Aggies had beaten the Javelinas in the first round of the playoffs the previous two seasons. The team outscored its opponents 398 to 259 for the season. The Aggies played home games at Toomey Field in Davis, California.

== Schedule ==
Date	Opponent	Rank	Site	Result	Attendance	Source
September 5	at Texas A&M–Commerce	No. 2	Memorial Stadium; Commerce, TX	W 34–10		
September 12	at South Dakota State	No. 2	Coughlin–Alumni Stadium; Brookings, SD	W 30–13		
September 19	Sacramento State	No. 2	Toomey Field; Davis, CA (Causeway Classic)	W 35–17	10,467	
September 26	New Haven	No. 2	Toomey Field; Davis, CA	L 11–12		
October 3	at Cal Poly	No. 7	Mustang Stadium; San Luis Obispo, CA (rivalry)	W 34–24		
October 10	at Central Washington	No. 6	Tomlinson Stadium; Ellensburg, WA	W 51–16		
October 17	at Western Washington	No. 5	Civic Stadium; Bellingham, WA	W 28–24		
October 24	Saint Mary's	No. 5	Toomey Field; Davis, CA	W 31–7		
October 31	at No. 10 Grand Valley State	No. 4	Lubbers Stadium; Allendale, MI	W 40–38		
November 7	Western Oregon	No. 4	Toomey Field; Davis, CA	W 48–16		
November 14	Southern Utah	No. 4	Toomey Field; Davis, CA	W 35–28		
November 21	No. 11 Texas A&M–Kingsville	No. 4	Toomey Field; Davis, CA (NCAA Division II First Round)	L 21–54		
Rankings from NCAA Division II Football Committee Poll released prior to the game

== NFL daft ==
The following UC Davis Aggies players were selected in the 1999 NFL draft.

Player	Position	Round	Overall	NFL team
Kevin Daft	Quarterback	5	151	Tennessee Titans
