= 1998 East Tennessee State Buccaneers football team =

American college football season

1998 East Tennessee State Buccaneers football
- Conference: Southern Conference
- Record: 4–7 (3–5 SoCon)
- Head coach: Paul Hamilton (2nd season)
- Home stadium: Memorial Center

1998 Southern Conference football standings
	Conf.			Overall
Team	W		L	W		L
No. 2 Georgia Southern $^	8	–	0	14	–	1
No. 6 Appalachian State ^	6	–	2	10	–	3
Western Carolina	5	–	3	6	–	5
Chattanooga	4	–	4	5	–	6
The Citadel	4	–	4	5	–	6
East Tennessee State	3	–	5	4	–	7
Wofford	3	–	5	4	–	7
Furman	3	–	5	5	–	6
VMI	0	–	8	1	–	10
$ – Conference champion; ^ – NCAA Division I-AA playoff participant; Rankings from The Sports Network I-AA Poll

The 1998 East Tennessee State Buccaneers football team was an American football team that represented East Tennessee State University as a member of the Southern Conference (SoCon) during the 1998 NCAA Division I-AA football season. Led by second-year head coach Paul Hamilton, the Buccaneers compiled and overall record of 4–7, with a mark of 3–5 in conference play, and finished tied for sixth in the SoCon.

== Schedule ==
Date	Time	Opponent	Rank	Site	Result	Attendance	Source
September 5	7:30 p.m.	at Miami (FL)*	No. 11	Miami Orange Bowl; Miami, FL	L 17–66	36,617	
September 12		No. 17 Appalachian State	No. 19	Memorial Center; Johnson City, TN	L 17–22	7,791	
September 19	7:00 p.m.	VMI		Memorial Center; Johnson City, TN	W 44–8	5,071	
September 26		at Western Carolina		E. J. Whitmire Stadium; Cullowhee, NC	L 24–31 ^{2OT}		
October 10		at The Citadel		Johnson Hagood Stadium; Charleston, SC	L 20–31	15,707	
October 17	2:30 p.m.	at Mississippi State*		Scott Field; Starkville, MS	L 6–53	37,573	
October 24		Furman		Memorial Center; Johnson City, TN	W 22–19 ^{2OT}	6,569	
October 31		at No. 1 Georgia Southern		Paulson Stadium; Statesboro, GA	L 26–47	15,189	
November 7	7:00 p.m.	Wofford		Memorial Center; Johnson City, TN	W 45–24	5,428	
November 14	1:30 p.m.	at Chattanooga		Finley Stadium; Chattanooga, TN	L 7–10	4,320	
November 21		Charleston Southern*		Memorial Center; Johnson City, TN	W 41–29		
*Non-conference game; Rankings from The Sports Network Poll released prior to the game
