= 1998 Appalachian State Mountaineers football team =

American college football season

1998 Appalachian State Mountaineers football

NCAA Division I-AA Quarterfinal, L 20–31 at Northwestern State
- Conference: Southern Conference

Ranking
- Sports Network: No. 6
- Record: 10–3 (6–2 SoCon)
- Head coach: Jerry Moore (10th season)
- Home stadium: Kidd Brewer Stadium

1998 Southern Conference football standings
	Conf.			Overall
Team	W		L	W		L
No. 2 Georgia Southern $^	8	–	0	14	–	1
No. 6 Appalachian State ^	6	–	2	10	–	3
Western Carolina	5	–	3	6	–	5
Chattanooga	4	–	4	5	–	6
The Citadel	4	–	4	5	–	6
East Tennessee State	3	–	5	4	–	7
Wofford	3	–	5	4	–	7
Furman	3	–	5	5	–	6
VMI	0	–	8	1	–	10
$ – Conference champion; ^ – NCAA Division I-AA playoff participant; Rankings from The Sports Network poll

The 1998 Appalachian State Mountaineers football team was an American football team that represented Appalachian State University as a member of the Southern Conference (SoCon) during the 1998 NCAA Division I-AA football season. In their tenth year under head coach Jerry Moore, the Mountaineers compiled an overall record of 10–3, with a conference mark of 6–2. Appalachian State advanced to the NCAA Division I-AA Football Championship playoffs, where they defeated Tennessee State in the first round and lost to Northwestern State in the quarterfinals.

== Schedule ==
Date	Opponent	Rank	Site	Result	Attendance	Source
September 5	Liberty*		Kidd Brewer Stadium; Boone, NC	W 28–19	13,161	
September 12	at No. 19 East Tennessee State	No. 17	Memorial Center; Johnson City, TN	W 22–17	7,791	
September 26	The Citadel	No. 14	Kidd Brewer Stadium; Boone, NC	W 26–11	10,261	
October 3	at Wake Forest*	No. 10	Groves Stadium; Winston-Salem, NC	W 30–27 ^{OT}	26,885	
October 10	No. 20 Furman	No. 4	Kidd Brewer Stadium; Boone, NC	W 26–13	15,883	
October 17	at No. 2 Georgia Southern	No. 3	Paulson Stadium; Statesboro, GA (rivalry)	L 24–37	20,353	
October 24	Wofford	No. 7	Kidd Brewer Stadium; Boone, NC	W 31–6	16,883	
October 31	at Chattanooga	No. 6	Finley Stadium; Chattanooga, TN	W 28–7	5,231	
November 7	VMI	No. 4	Kidd Brewer Stadium; Boone, NC	W 51–0	18,391	
November 14	at Eastern Kentucky*	No. 4	Roy Kidd Stadium; Richmond, KY	W 19–0	5,200	
November 21	at Western Carolina	No. 3	Whitmire Stadium; Cullowhee, NC (rivalry)	L 6–23	13,785	
November 28	No. 13 Tennessee State*	No. 7	Kidd Brewer Stadium; Boone, NC (NCAA Division I-AA First Round)	W 45–31	3,885	
December 5	at No. 2 Northwestern State*	No. 7	Harry Turpin Stadium; Natchitoches, LA (NCAA Division I-AA Quarterfinal)	L 20–31	10,817	
*Non-conference game; Rankings from The Sports Network Poll released prior to the game
