= 1998 Wofford Terriers football team =

American college football season

1998 Wofford Terriers football
- Conference: Southern Conference
- Record: 4–7 (3–5 SoCon)
- Head coach: Mike Ayers (11th season)
- Home stadium: Gibbs Stadium

1998 Southern Conference football standings
| | Conf. | | | Overall |
| Team | W | | L | W | | L |
|---|---|---|---|---|---|---|
| No. 2 Georgia Southern $^ | 8 | – | 0 | 14 | – | 1 |
| No. 6 Appalachian State ^ | 6 | – | 2 | 10 | – | 3 |
| Western Carolina | 5 | – | 3 | 6 | – | 5 |
| Chattanooga | 4 | – | 4 | 5 | – | 6 |
| The Citadel | 4 | – | 4 | 5 | – | 6 |
| East Tennessee State | 3 | – | 5 | 4 | – | 7 |
| Wofford | 3 | – | 5 | 4 | – | 7 |
| Furman | 3 | – | 5 | 5 | – | 6 |
| VMI | 0 | – | 8 | 1 | – | 10 |
$ – Conference champion; ^ – NCAA Division I-AA playoff participant; Rankings from The Sports Network I-AA Poll

The 1998 Wofford Terriers football team was an American football team that represented Wofford College as a member of the Southern Conference (SoCon) during the 1998 NCAA Division I-AA football season. Led by 11th-year head coach Mike Ayers, the Terriers compiled and overall record of 4–7, with a mark of 3–5 in conference play, and finished tied for sixth in the SoCon.

== Schedule ==
| Date | Time | Opponent | Site | TV | Result | Attendance | Source |
|---|---|---|---|---|---|---|---|
| September 12 | 7:00 p.m. | The Citadel | Gibbs Stadium; Spartanburg, SC (rivalry) | | L 14–20 | 10,271 | |
| September 19 | 1:00 p.m. | at No. 3 Georgia Southern | Paulson Stadium; Statesboro, GA | | L 10–45 | 8,649 | |
| September 26 | 7:00 p.m. | Charleston Southern* | Gibbs Stadium; Spartanburg, SC | | W 20–0 | 5,896 | |
| October 3 | 2:00 p.m. | Chattanooga | Gibbs Stadium; Spartanburg, SC | | L 3–31 | 6,791 | |
| October 10 | 12:30 p.m. | at VMI | Alumni Memorial Field; Lexington, VA | SSN | W 42–20 | 6,541 | |
| October 17 | 2:00 p.m. | Western Carolina | Gibbs Stadium; Spartanburg, SC | | W 17–10 | 7,413 | |
| October 24 | 1:00 p.m. | at No. 7 Appalachian State | Kidd Brewer Stadium; Boone, NC | | L 6–31 | 16,883 | |
| October 31 | 12:30 p.m. | at No. 25 Lehigh* | Goodman Stadium; Bethlehem, PA | | L 0–26 | 12,147 | |
| November 7 | 7:00 p.m. | at East Tennessee State | Memorial Center; Johnson City, TN | | L 24–45 | 5,428 | |
| November 14 | 2:00 p.m. | Furman | Gibbs Stadium; Spartanburg, SC (rivalry) | | W 40–20 | 5,896 | |
| November 21 | 12:00 p.m. | at Marshall* | Marshall University Stadium; Huntington, WV | | L 27–29 | 18,477 | |
*Non-conference game; Rankings from The Sports Network Poll released prior to the game; All times are in Eastern time
