= 1998 North Carolina A&T Aggies football team =

American college football season

1998 North Carolina A&T Aggies football
- Conference: Mid-Eastern Athletic Conference
- Record: 8–3 (5–3 MEAC)
- Head coach: Bill Hayes (11th season)
- Home stadium: Aggie Stadium

1998 Mid-Eastern Athletic Conference football standings
	Conf.			Overall
Team	W		L	W		L
No. 5 Florida A&M +^	7	–	1	11	–	2
No. 11 Hampton +^	7	–	1	9	–	3
No. 18 Bethune–Cookman	6	–	2	8	–	3
North Carolina A&T	5	–	3	8	–	3
Howard	5	–	3	7	–	4
South Carolina State	3	–	5	5	–	6
Norfolk State	2	–	6	2	–	9
Morgan State	1	–	7	1	–	10
Delaware State	0	–	8	0	–	11
+ – Conference co-champions; ^ – NCAA Division I-AA playoff participant; Rankings from The Sports Network poll

The 1998 North Carolina A&T Aggies football team represented North Carolina A&T State University as a member of the Mid-Eastern Athletic Conference (MEAC) during the 1998 NCAA Division I-AA football season. Led by 11th-year head coach Bill Hayes, the Aggies compiled an overall record of 8–3, with a mark of 5–3 in conference play, and finished tied for fourth in the MEAC.

== Schedule ==
Date	Opponent	Site	Result	Attendance	Source
September 5	vs. North Carolina Central*	Carter–Finley Stadium; Raleigh, NC (rivalry)	W 40–10	45,453	
September 12	Winston–Salem State*	Aggie Stadium; Greensboro, NC (rivalry)	W 20–12	15,663	
September 20	at No. 5 Hampton	Armstrong Stadium; Hampton, VA	L 10–23		
September 26	Fayetteville State*	Aggie Stadium; Greensboro, NC	W 37–20	6,887	
October 3	Norfolk State	Aggie Stadium; Greensboro, NC	W 34–20	10,784	
October 10	at No. 16 Florida A&M	Bragg Memorial Stadium; Tallahassee, FL	L 12–51	27,043	
October 17	Morgan State	Aggie Stadium; Greensboro, NC	W 19–16	15,501	
October 26	at Howard	William H. Greene Stadium; Washington, DC	W 17–6		
October 31	Bethune–Cookman	Aggie Stadium; Greensboro, NC	L 27–34 ^{OT}		
November 7	at Delaware State	Alumni Stadium; Dover, DE	W 47–15		
November 21	vs. South Carolina State	Ericsson Stadium; Charlotte, NC (Carolinas Classic, rivalry)	W 14–6	31,230	
*Non-conference game; Rankings from The Sports Network Poll released prior to the game
