= 1998 Furman Paladins football team =

American college football season

1998 Furman Paladins football
- Conference: Southern Conference
- Record: 5–6 (3–5 SoCon)
- Head coach: Bobby Johnson (5th season)
- Captains: Orlando Ruff; Tyron Berrian; John Keith; Mark Foster
- Home stadium: Paladin Stadium

1998 Southern Conference football standings
	Conf.			Overall
Team	W		L	W		L
No. 2 Georgia Southern $^	8	–	0	14	–	1
No. 6 Appalachian State ^	6	–	2	10	–	3
Western Carolina	5	–	3	6	–	5
Chattanooga	4	–	4	5	–	6
The Citadel	4	–	4	5	–	6
East Tennessee State	3	–	5	4	–	7
Wofford	3	–	5	4	–	7
Furman	3	–	5	5	–	6
VMI	0	–	8	1	–	10
$ – Conference champion; ^ – NCAA Division I-AA playoff participant; Rankings from The Sports Network I-AA Poll

The 1998 Furman Paladins football team was an American football team that represented Furman University as a member of the Southern Conference (SoCon) during the 1998 NCAA Division I-AA football season. In their fifth year under head coach Bobby Johnson, the Paladins compiled an overall record of 5–6, with a mark of 3–5 in conference play, finishing tied for sixth in the SoCon.

== Schedule ==
Date	Opponent	Rank	Site	Result	Attendance	Source
September 5	at Clemson*		Memorial Stadium; Clemson, SC	L 0–33	70,855	
September 12	South Carolina State*		Paladin Stadium; Greenville, SC	W 27–19	10,094	
September 19	Samford*		Paladin Stadium; Greenville, SC	W 34–24	8,101	
September 26	at VMI		Alumni Memorial Field; Lexington, VA	W 51–14	6,298	
October 3	Western Carolina	No. 25	Paladin Stadium; Greenville, SC	W 31–7	9,620	
October 10	at No. 4 Appalachian State	No. 20	Kidd Brewer Stadium; Boone, NC	L 13–26	15,883	
October 17	The Citadel	No. 24	Paladin Stadium; Greenville, SC (rivalry)	L 24–25	13,011	
October 24	at East Tennessee State		Memorial Center; Johnson City, TN	L 19–22 ^{2OT}	6,569	
November 7	No. 1 Georgia Southern		Paladin Stadium; Greenville, SC	L 17–45	10,201	
November 14	at Wofford*		Gibbs Stadium; Spartanburg, SC (rivalry)	L 20–40	5,896	
November 21	Chattanooga		Paladin Stadium; Greenville, SC	W 31–28	6,215	
*Non-conference game; Rankings from The Sports Network Poll released prior to the game
