= 1998 Western Carolina Catamounts football team =

American college football season

1998 Western Carolina Catamounts football
- Conference: Southern Conference
- Record: 6–5 (5–3 SoCon)
- Head coach: Bill Bleil (2nd season)
- Home stadium: E. J. Whitmire Stadium

1998 Southern Conference football standings
	Conf.			Overall
Team	W		L	W		L
No. 2 Georgia Southern $^	8	–	0	14	–	1
No. 6 Appalachian State ^	6	–	2	10	–	3
Western Carolina	5	–	3	6	–	5
Chattanooga	4	–	4	5	–	6
The Citadel	4	–	4	5	–	6
East Tennessee State	3	–	5	4	–	7
Wofford	3	–	5	4	–	7
Furman	3	–	5	5	–	6
VMI	0	–	8	1	–	10
$ – Conference champion; ^ – NCAA Division I-AA playoff participant; Rankings from The Sports Network I-AA Poll

The 1998 Western Carolina Catamounts team was an American football team that represented Western Carolina University as a member of the Southern Conference (SoCon) during the 1998 NCAA Division I-AA football season. In their second year under head coach Bill Bleil, the team compiled an overall record of 6–5, with a mark of 5–3 in conference play, and finished third in the SoCon.

== Schedule ==
Date	Time	Opponent	Site	Result	Attendance	Source
September 5	7:00 p.m.	at Duke*	Wallace Wade Stadium; Durham, NC	L 10–24	22,460	
September 19		at The Citadel	Johnson Hagood Stadium; Charleston, SC	W 14–8	11,011	
September 26		East Tennessee State	E. J. Whitmire Stadium; Cullowhee, NC	W 31–24 ^{2OT}		
October 3		at No. 25 Furman	Paladin Stadium; Greenville, SC	L 7–31	9,620	
October 10		No. 2 Georgia Southern	E. J. Whitmire Stadium; Cullowhee, NC	L 21–28	9,671	
October 17	2:00 p.m.	at Wofford	Gibbs Stadium; Spartanburg, SC	L 10–17	7,413	
October 24	1:00 p.m.	Chattanooga	E. J. Whitmire Stadium; Cullowhee, NC	W 24–21	7,747	
October 31	1:00 p.m.	at VMI	Alumni Memorial Field; Lexington, VA	W 39–17	3,714	
November 7		Elon*	E. J. Whitmire Stadium; Cullowhee, NC	W 10–7	6,844	
November 14		at Tennessee Tech*	Tucker Stadium; Cookeville, TN	L 6–17	1,300	
November 21		No. 3 Appalachian State	E. J. Whitmire Stadium; Cullowhee, NC (rivalry)	W 23–6	13,785	
*Non-conference game; Rankings from The Sports Network Poll released prior to the game; All times are in Eastern time
