= 1998 NCAA Division II football season =

American college football season

- Regular season: September 5 – November 14, 1998
- Playoffs: November 21 – December 12, 1998
- National Championship: Braly Municipal Stadium; Florence, AL
- Champion: Northwest Missouri State
- Harlon Hill Trophy: Brian Shay, Emporia State

The 1998 NCAA Division II football season, part of college football in the United States organized by the National Collegiate Athletic Association at the Division II level, began on September 5, 1998, and concluded with the NCAA Division II Football Championship on December 12, 1998, at Braly Municipal Stadium in Florence, Alabama, hosted by the University of North Alabama. The Northwest Missouri State Bearcats defeated Carson–Newman, 24–6, to win their first Division II national title.

The Harlon Hill Trophy was awarded to Brian Shay, running back from Emporia State.

== Conference changes and new programs ==
School	1997 Conference	1998 Conference
Alabama A&M	SIAC	SWAC (I-AA)
Findlay	MSFA (NAIA)	MIFC
Lane	D-II Independent	SIAC
Mercyhurst	D-II Independent	MIFC
Sacred Heart	Eastern	Northeast (I-AA)
Westminster (PA)	MSFA (NAIA)	MIFC

=== Program changes ===
- Mankato State University changed its name to Minnesota State University, Mankato in 1998, the Mankato State Mavericks became the Minnesota State Mavericks during the 1998 season.

== Conference standings ==
1998 Central Intercollegiate Athletic Association football standings
	Conf.			Overall
Team	W		L	W		L
Livingstone +	5	–	2	7	–	3
Winston-Salem State +	5	–	2	5	–	5
Virginia Union	4	–	3	8	–	3
Bowie State	4	–	3	6	–	3
Johnson C. Smith	4	–	3	6	–	4
Fayetteville State	4	–	3	5	–	5
North Carolina Central	3	–	4	4	–	6
Virginia State	2	–	5	3	–	7
Elizabeth City State	1	–	7	2	–	9
+ – Conference co-champions

1998 Eastern Football Conference standings
	Conf.			Overall
Team	W		L	W		L
Atlantic Division
Albany xy$	7	–	1	10	–	1
Southern Connecticut	6	–	2	8	–	2
C. W. Post	6	–	2	7	–	3
Pace	3	–	5	5	–	5
Stony Brook	3	–	5	3	–	6
Bay State Division
Bentley x	7	–	2	8	–	2
American International xy	7	–	2	7	–	4
Merrimack	2	–	6	3	–	6
Stonehill	2	–	6	2	–	8
UMass Lowell	2	–	6	2	–	8
Assumption	0	–	8	0	–	9
Championship: Albany 25, American International 24
$ – Conference champion; x – Division champion/co-champions; y – Championship game participant

1998 Gulf South Conference football standings
	Conf.			Overall
Team	W		L	W		L
No. 18 West Georgia +^	8	–	1	10	–	2
No. 17 Delta State +^	8	–	1	8	–	3
North Alabama	7	–	2	8	–	2
Southern Arkansas	7	–	2	8	–	2
Arkansas Tech	4	–	5	5	–	5
Central Arkansas	4	–	5	5	–	5
Valdosta State	4	–	5	5	–	6
West Alabama	2	–	7	3	–	7
Henderson State	1	–	8	2	–	9
Arkansas–Monticello	0	–	9	0	–	11
+ – Conference co-champions; ^ – NCAA Division II playoff participant; Rankings from NCAA Division II Football Committee poll

1998 Lone Star Conference football standings
	Conf.			Overall
Team	W		L	W		L
Overall*
No. 1 Central Oklahoma $^	9	–	0	12	–	1
No. 11 Texas A&M–Kingsville ^	8	–	1	11	–	3
No. 15 West Texas A&M	7	–	2	8	–	3
Northeastern State	6	–	2	8	–	2
Eastern New Mexico	6	–	3	8	–	3
Angelo State	6	–	3	6	–	4
Harding	5	–	3	7	–	4
SE Oklahoma State	4	–	4	5	–	5
Ouachita Baptist	3	–	5	3	–	7
Tarleton State	3	–	6	3	–	8
Abilene Christian	3	–	5	4	–	6
Texas A&M–Commerce	3	–	6	3	–	8
East Central	1	–	7	2	–	8
Midwestern State	1	–	8	2	–	9
SW Oklahoma State	0	–	9	0	–	10
North Division
No. 1 Central Oklahoma x$^	6	–	0	12	–	1
Northeastern State	5	–	1	8	–	2
Harding	4	–	2	7	–	4
SE Oklahoma State	3	–	3	5	–	5
Ouachita Baptist	2	–	4	3	–	7
East Central	1	–	5	2	–	8
SW Oklahoma State	0	–	6	0	–	10
South Division
No. 11 Texas A&M–Kingsville x^	7	–	0	11	–	3
No. 15 West Texas A&M	5	–	2	8	–	3
Eastern New Mexico	4	–	3	8	–	3
Angelo State	4	–	3	6	–	4
Tarleton State	3	–	4	3	–	8
Abilene Christian	2	–	5	4	–	6
Texas A&M–Commerce	2	–	5	3	–	8
Midwestern State	1	–	6	2	–	9
$ – Conference champion; ^ – NCAA Division II playoff participant; * – The LSC counted separate overall and division standings.; Rankings from NCAA Division II Football Committee poll

1998 Mid-America Intercollegiate Athletics Association football standings
	Conf.			Overall
Team	W		L	W		L
No. 2 NW Missouri State $^	9	–	0	15	–	0
No. 10 Emporia State	7	–	2	9	–	2
Central Missouri State	6	–	3	8	–	3
Pittsburg State	6	–	3	7	–	3
Truman State	6	–	3	6	–	5
Missouri Western	3	–	6	5	–	6
Washburn	3	–	6	4	–	6
Missouri Southern	3	–	6	3	–	7
Southwest Baptist	2	–	7	3	–	8
Missouri–Rolla	0	–	9	0	–	11
$ – Conference champion; ^ – NCAA Division II playoff participant; Rankings from NCAA Division II Football Committee poll

1998 Midwest Intercollegiate Football Conference standings
	Conf.			Overall
Team	W		L	W		L
No. 14 Grand Valley State $^	9	–	1	9	–	3
Saginaw Valley State	8	–	2	9	–	2
Indianapolis	8	–	2	8	–	2
Ashland	7	–	3	7	–	3
Northwood	7	–	3	7	–	3
Findlay	5	–	5	5	–	5
Mercyhurst	5	–	5	5	–	5
Ferris State	5	–	5	5	–	6
Northern Michigan	4	–	5	5	–	5
Michigan Tech	4	–	6	4	–	6
Hillsdale	3	–	7	3	–	8
Westminster (PA)	2	–	7	3	–	7
Wayne State (MI)	2	–	8	2	–	9
St. Francis (IL)	0	–	10	0	–	11
$ – Conference champion; ^ – NCAA Division II playoff participant; Rankings from NCAA Division II Football Committee poll

1998 North Central Conference football standings
	Conf.			Overall
Team	W		L	W		L
No. 6 Northern Colorado +^	8	–	1	11	–	2
No. 16 Nebraska–Omaha +^	8	–	1	9	–	3
No. 7 North Dakota ^	7	–	2	8	–	3
North Dakota State	6	–	3	7	–	4
South Dakota State	5	–	4	6	–	5
Minnesota State	4	–	5	5	–	6
St. Cloud State	3	–	6	3	–	8
Augustana (SD)	2	–	7	4	–	7
South Dakota	1	–	8	3	–	8
Morningside	1	–	8	2	–	7
+ – Conference co-champions; ^ – NCAA Division II playoff participant; Rankings from NCAA Division II Football Committee poll

1998 Northern Sun Intercollegiate Conference football standings
	Conf.			Overall
Team	W		L	W		L
No. 20 Winona State $	6	–	0	9	–	2
Northern State	5	–	1	8	–	3
Bemidji State	4	–	2	6	–	4
Minnesota Duluth	3	–	3	4	–	7
Southwest State (MN)	2	–	4	3	–	7
Moorhead State	1	–	5	3	–	7
Minnesota Morris	0	–	6	1	–	9
Wayne State (NE) *	0	–	0	1	–	10
$ – Conference champion; * – ineligible for conference championship; Rankings from NCAA Division II Football Committee poll

1998 Pennsylvania State Athletic Conference football standings
	Conf.			Overall
Team	W		L	W		L
East Division
Millersville x	6	–	0	8	–	2
West Chester	5	–	1	8	–	3
Bloomsburg	4	–	2	6	–	5
Kutztown	3	–	3	5	–	5
East Stroudsburg	2	–	4	2	–	8
Cheyney	1	–	5	1	–	10
Mansfield	0	–	6	0	–	11
West Division
No. 5 Slippery Rock x^	6	–	0	12	–	2
No. 8 IUP ^	5	–	1	10	–	2
Shippensburg	4	–	2	7	–	4
Edinboro	2	–	4	4	–	7
Lock Haven	2	–	4	4	–	7
California (PA)	1	–	5	4	–	7
Clarion	1	–	5	3	–	8
x – Division champion/co-champions; ^ – NCAA Division II playoff participant; Rankings from NCAA Division II Football Committee poll

1998 Rocky Mountain Athletic Conference football standings
	Conf.			Overall
Team	W		L	W		L
No. 19 Chadron State +^	7	–	1	9	–	3
Western State (CO) +	7	–	1	7	–	3
New Mexico Highlands	6	–	2	8	–	3
Nebraska–Kearney	5	–	3	5	–	5
Fort Hays State	4	–	4	6	–	5
Adams State	3	–	5	4	–	6
Mesa State	2	–	6	5	–	6
Colorado Mines	2	–	6	3	–	7
Fort Lewis	0	–	8	0	–	10
+ – Conference co-champions; ^ – NCAA Division II playoff participant; Rankings from NCAA Division II Football Committee poll

1998 South Atlantic Conference football standings
	Conf.			Overall
Team	W		L	W		L
No. 3 Carson–Newman $^	7	–	0	12	–	2
Presbyterian	6	–	1	8	–	3
Catawba	4	–	3	6	–	4
Gardner–Webb	4	–	3	6	–	5
Newberry	3	–	4	6	–	5
Wingate	3	–	4	5	–	6
Lenoir–Rhyne	1	–	6	2	–	9
Mars Hill	0	–	7	1	–	10
Tusculum *	0	–	0	5	–	6
$ – Conference champion; ^ – NCAA Division II playoff participant; * – provisional conference member; Rankings from NCAA Division II Football Committee poll

1998 Southern Intercollegiate Athletic Conference football standings
	Conf.			Overall
Team	W		L	W		L
Tuskegee $	6	–	0	10	–	2
No. 12 Fort Valley State ^	5	–	1	11	–	2
Albany State	5	–	1	9	–	2
Savannah State	4	–	2	7	–	4
Kentucky State	4	–	2	5	–	6
Lane	2	–	4	4	–	6
Miles	2	–	4	4	–	6
Clark Atlanta	2	–	4	3	–	7
Morehouse	0	–	6	3	–	8
Morris Brown	0	–	6	0	–	11
$ – Conference champion; ^ – NCAA Division II playoff participant; Rankings from NCAA Division II Football Committee poll

1998 West Virginia Intercollegiate Athletic Conference football standings
	Conf.			Overall
Team	W		L	W		L
No. 13 Shepherd $^	7	–	0	10	–	2
Fairmont State	5	–	2	5	–	5
Glenville State	4	–	3	6	–	5
West Virginia Wesleyan	4	–	3	4	–	6
Concord	3	–	4	6	–	5
West Liberty State	3	–	4	4	–	6
West Virginia State	2	–	5	3	–	8
West Virginia Tech	0	–	7	0	–	11
$ – Conference champion; ^ – NCAA Division II playoff participant; Rankings from NCAA Division II Football Committee poll

1998 NCAA Division II independents football records
	Conf.			Overall
Team	W		L	W		L
No. 4 UC Davis ^		–		10	–	2
Saint Joseph's (IN)		–		7	–	4
New Haven		–		5	–	5
Elon		–		5	–	6
Quincy		–		4	–	6
Gannon		–		3	–	7
Oklahoma Panhandle State		–		3	–	7
Kentucky Wesleyan		–		2	–	7
Western New Mexico		–		2	–	7
^ – NCAA Division II playoff participant; Rankings from NCAA Division II Football Committee poll

=== Mixed NCAA/NAIA conferences ===
1998 Columbia Football Association standings
	Conf.			Overall
Team	W		L	W		L
No. 15 Central Washington † $	4	–	1	7	–	4
Western Washington *	3	–	2	5	–	5
Humboldt State *	3	–	2	4	–	7
Western Oregon	2	–	3	4	–	5
Southern Oregon	2	–	3	4	–	6
Simon Fraser	1	–	4	3	–	6
$ – Conference champion; † – NAIA playoff participant * – Also classified as NCAA Division II independent; Rankings from NAIA poll

== Conference summaries ==
Conference Champions

Central Intercollegiate Athletic Association – Livingstone and Winston-Salem State
Eastern Collegiate Football Conference – Albany
Gulf South Conference – Delta State and West Georgia
Lone Star Conference – Central Oklahoma
Mid-America Intercollegiate Athletics Association – Northwest Missouri State
Midwest Intercollegiate Football Conference – Grand Valley State
North Central Conference – Nebraska–Omaha and Northern Colorado
Northern Sun Intercollegiate Conference – Winona State
Pennsylvania State Athletic Conference – Millersville (East), Slippery Rock (West)
Rocky Mountain Athletic Conference – Chadron State and Western State (CO)
South Atlantic Conference – Carson-Newman
Southern Intercollegiate Athletic Conference – Tuskegee
West Virginia Intercollegiate Athletic Conference – Shepherd

== Postseason ==
1998 NCAA Division II Football Championship
- Teams: 16
- Finals Site: Braly Municipal Stadium; Florence, AL
- Champion: Northwest Missouri State; (1st title, title game)
- Runner-up: Carson–Newman; (2nd title game)
- Semifinalists: Slippery Rock; Texas A&M–Kingsville†
- Winning coach: championship

The 1998 NCAA Division II Football Championship playoffs were the 25th single-elimination tournament to determine the national champion of men's NCAA Division II college football. The championship game was held at Braly Municipal Stadium in Florence, Alabama, for the 12th time.

=== Playoff bracket ===
First round Campus sites
Carson–Newman	30
West Georgia	20
Fort Valley State	21
Delta State	14
Slippery Rock	37
Grand Valley State	14
Shepherd	9
IUP	6
Northwest Missouri State	28
Nebraska–Omaha	14
Northern Colorado	52
North Dakota	24
Central Oklahoma	21
Chadron State	19
Texas A&M–Kingsville†	54
UC Davis	21

Quarterfinals; Campus sites
Carson–Newman	38
Fort Valley State	31
Slippery Rock	31
Shepherd	20
Northwest Missouri State	42
Northern Colorado	17
Central Oklahoma	21
Texas A&M–Kingsville†	24*

Semifinals; Campus sites
Carson–Newman	47
Slippery Rock	21
Northwest Missouri State	49
Texas A&M–Kingsville†	34

Championship; Braly Municipal Stadium; Florence, AL
Carson–Newman	6
Northwest Missouri State	24

Note:† Texas A&M–Kingsville forfeited these games as a result of using ineligible players.

== See also ==
- 1998 NCAA Division II football rankings
- 1998 NCAA Division I-A football season
- 1998 NCAA Division I-AA football season
- 1998 NCAA Division III football season
- 1998 NAIA football season
