= 1998 South Carolina State Bulldogs football team =

American college football season

1998 South Carolina State Bulldogs football
- Conference: Mid-Eastern Athletic Conference
- Record: 5–6 (3–5 MEAC)
- Head coach: Willie Jeffries (16th season)
- Home stadium: Oliver C. Dawson Stadium

1998 Mid-Eastern Athletic Conference football standings
	Conf.			Overall
Team	W		L	W		L
No. 5 Florida A&M +^	7	–	1	11	–	2
No. 11 Hampton +^	7	–	1	9	–	3
No. 18 Bethune–Cookman	6	–	2	8	–	3
North Carolina A&T	5	–	3	8	–	3
Howard	5	–	3	7	–	4
South Carolina State	3	–	5	5	–	6
Norfolk State	2	–	6	2	–	9
Morgan State	1	–	7	1	–	10
Delaware State	0	–	8	0	–	11
+ – Conference co-champions; ^ – NCAA Division I-AA playoff participant; Rankings from The Sports Network poll

The 1998 South Carolina State Bulldogs football team represented South Carolina State University as a member of the Mid-Eastern Athletic Conference (MEAC) during the 1998 NCAA Division I-AA football season. Led by 16th-year head coach Willie Jeffries, the Bulldogs compiled an overall record of 5–6, with a mark of 3–5 in conference play, and finished sixth in the MEAC.

== Schedule ==
Date	Opponent	Site	Result	Attendance	Source
September 5	at Charleston Southern*	Buccaneer Field; North Charleston, SC	W 17–7	5,750	
September 12	at Furman*	Paladin Stadium; Greenville, SC	L 19–27	10,094	
September 26	Johnson C. Smith*	Oliver C. Dawson Stadium; Orangeburg, SC	W 14–0	10,232	
October 3	Morgan State	Oliver C. Dawson Stadium; Orangeburg, SC	W 21–0		
October 10	at Norfolk State	William "Dick" Price Stadium; Norfolk, VA	W 43–26		
October 17	Bethune–Cookman	Oliver C. Dawson Stadium; Orangeburg, SC	L 17–28		
October 24	No. 2 Hampton	Oliver C. Dawson Stadium; Orangeburg, SC	L 7–20	15,519	
October 31	at Delaware State	Alumni Stadium; Dover, DE	W 31–14		
November 7	Howard	Oliver C. Dawson Stadium; Orangeburg, SC	L 31–32	6,225	
November 14	at No. 5 Florida A&M	Bragg Memorial Stadium; Tallahassee, FL	L 14–37		
November 21	vs. North Carolina A&T	Ericsson Stadium; Charlotte, NC (Carolinas Classic, rivalry)	L 6–14	31,230	
*Non-conference game; Rankings from The Sports Network Poll released prior to the game
