= 1998 North Dakota State Bison football team =

American college football season

1998 North Dakota State Bison football
- Conference: North Central Conference
- Record: 7–4 (6–3 NCC)
- Head coach: Bob Babich (2nd season)
- Offensive scheme: Multiple
- Defensive coordinator: Gus Bradley (2nd season)
- Base defense: 4–3
- Home stadium: Fargodome

1998 North Central Conference football standings
	Conf.			Overall
Team	W		L	W		L
No. 6 Northern Colorado +^	8	–	1	11	–	2
No. 16 Nebraska–Omaha +^	8	–	1	9	–	3
No. 7 North Dakota ^	7	–	2	8	–	3
North Dakota State	6	–	3	7	–	4
South Dakota State	5	–	4	6	–	5
Minnesota State	4	–	5	5	–	6
St. Cloud State	3	–	6	3	–	8
Augustana (SD)	2	–	7	4	–	7
South Dakota	1	–	8	3	–	8
Morningside	1	–	8	2	–	7
+ – Conference co-champions; ^ – NCAA Division II playoff participant; Rankings from NCAA Division II Football Committee poll

The 1998 North Dakota State Bison football team was an American football team that represented North Dakota State University during the 1998 NCAA Division II football season as a member of the North Central Conference. In their second year under head coach Bob Babich, the team compiled a 7–4 record.

== Schedule ==
Date	Opponent	Rank	Site	Result	Source
August 27	Emporia State*	No. 7	Fargodome; Fargo, ND	L 21–23	
September 3	Texas A&M–Kingsville*		Fargodome; Fargo, ND	W 16–6	
September 19	at No. 19 Nebraska–Omaha		Al F. Caniglia Field; Omaha, NE	L 28–49	
September 26	at Augustana (SD)		Howard Wood Field; Sioux Falls, SD	W 44–12	
October 3	No. 1 Northern Colorado^{†}		Fargodome; Fargo, ND	L 19–29	
October 10	at Morningside		Roberts Stadium; Sioux City, IA	W 54–20	
October 17	No. 17 North Dakota		Fargodome; Fargo, ND (Nickel Trophy)	L 25–39	
October 24	South Dakota State		Fargodome; Fargo, ND (rivalry)	W 35–32	
October 31	at St. Cloud State		Selke Field; St. Cloud, MN	W 34–31	
November 7	at Minnesota State		Blakeslee Stadium; Mankato, MN	W 35–28	
November 14	South Dakota		Fargodome; Fargo, ND	W 51–7	
*Non-conference game; ^{†}Homecoming; Rankings from NCAA Division II Football Committee Poll released prior to the game
