= 1998 Jacksonville Dolphins football team =

American college football team

1998 Jacksonville Dolphins football
- Conference: Independent
- Record: 4–5
- Head coach: Steve Gilbert (1st season)
- Offensive coordinator: Ed Foley (1st season)
- Home stadium: D. B. Milne Field

1998 NCAA Division I-AA independents football standings
	Conf.			Overall
Team	W		L	W		L
Morehead State		–		9	–	2
Davidson		–		8	–	2
No. 20 Hofstra		–		8	–	3
No. 22 South Florida		–		8	–	3
No. 19 Western Kentucky		–		7	–	4
Samford		–		6	–	5
Liberty		–		5	–	6
Southern Utah		–		5	–	6
Austin Peay		–		4	–	7
Buffalo		–		4	–	7
Jacksonville		–		4	–	5
La Salle		–		3	–	6
Cal Poly		–		3	–	8
Charleston Southern		–		3	–	8
Saint Mary's		–		2	–	8
Rankings from The Sports Network poll

The 1998 Jacksonville Dolphins football team represented Jacksonville University as an independent during the 1998 NCAA Division I-AA football season. This was the first year in which Jacksonville fielded a football team. Led by first-year head coach Steve Gilbert, the Dolphins compiled a record of 4–5. Jacksonville played home games at D. B. Milne Field in Jacksonville, Florida.

== Schedule ==
Date	Opponent	Site	Result	Attendance	Source
September 12	Davidson	D. B. Milne Field; Jacksonville, FL	W 19–14	4,890	
September 19	at Chowan	Garrison Stadium; Murfreesboro, NC	W 29–7	1,800	
September 26	at Mississippi College	Robinson-Hale Stadium; Clinton, MS	L 14–35	6,837	
October 3	Austin Peay	D. B. Milne Field; Jacksonville, FL	L 25–40	2,913	
October 10	Methodist	D. B. Milne Field; Jacksonville, FL	L 26–35	1,782	
October 17	at Greensboro	Pride Stadium; Greensboro, NC	W 35–14	479	
October 24	at Virginia–Wise	Carl Smith Stadium; Wise, VA	L 21–31	750	
November 7	La Salle	D. B. Milne Field; Jacksonville, FL	W 58–14	2,686	
November 14	Wagner	D. B. Milne Field; Jacksonville, FL	L 44–62	1,610	
