= 1998 Morgan State Bears football team =

American college football season

1998 Morgan State Bears football
- Conference: Mid-Eastern Athletic Conference
- Record: 1–10 (1–7 MEAC)
- Head coach: Stump Mitchell (3rd season)
- Home stadium: Hughes Stadium; Ravens Stadium at Camden Yards

1998 Mid-Eastern Athletic Conference football standings
	Conf.			Overall
Team	W		L	W		L
No. 5 Florida A&M +^	7	–	1	11	–	2
No. 11 Hampton +^	7	–	1	9	–	3
No. 18 Bethune–Cookman	6	–	2	8	–	3
North Carolina A&T	5	–	3	8	–	3
Howard	5	–	3	7	–	4
South Carolina State	3	–	5	5	–	6
Norfolk State	2	–	6	2	–	9
Morgan State	1	–	7	1	–	10
Delaware State	0	–	8	0	–	11
+ – Conference co-champions; ^ – NCAA Division I-AA playoff participant; Rankings from The Sports Network poll

The 1998 Morgan State Bears football team represented Morgan State University as a member of the Mid-Eastern Athletic Conference (MEAC) during the 1998 NCAA Division I-AA football season. Led by third-year head coach Stump Mitchell, the Bears compiled an overall record of 1–10, with a mark of 1–7 in conference play, and finished eighth in the MEAC.

== Schedule ==
Date	Opponent	Site	Result	Attendance	Source
September 3	at Towson*	Minnegan Stadium; Towson, MD (rivalry)	L 10–15	8,056	
September 12	Bethune–Cookman	Hughes Stadium; Baltimore, MD	L 20–25	1,000	
September 26	Norfolk State	Hughes Stadium; Baltimore, MD	L 43–46 ^{OT}		
October 3	at South Carolina State	Oliver C. Dawson Stadium; Orangeburg, SC	L 0–21		
October 10	at Buffalo*	University at Buffalo Stadium; Amherst, NY	L 17–35	19,854	
October 17	at North Carolina A&T	Aggie Stadium; Greensboro, NC	L 16–19	15,501	
October 24	Delaware State^{†}	Ravens Stadium at Camden Yards; Baltimore, MD	W 15–13	25,180	
October 31	at No. 7 Florida A&M	Bragg Memorial Stadium; Tallahassee, FL	L 32–59	12,122	
November 7	at Samford*	Seibert Stadium; Homewood, AL	L 12–13	4,003	
November 14	at Howard	William H. Greene Stadium; Washington, DC (rivalry)	L 3–69	6,903	
November 22	No. 10 Hampton	Hughes Stadium; Baltimore, MD	L 0–55		
*Non-conference game; ^{†}Homecoming; Rankings from The Sports Network Poll released prior to the game
