= 1998 North Dakota Fighting Sioux football team =

American college football season

1998 North Dakota Fighting Sioux football

NCAA Division II First Round, L 24–52 at Northern Colorado
- Conference: North Central Conference
- Record: 8–3 (7–2 NCC)
- Head coach: Roger Thomas (13th season)
- Defensive coordinator: Bubba Schweigert (2nd season)
- Home stadium: Memorial Stadium

1998 North Central Conference football standings
	Conf.			Overall
Team	W		L	W		L
No. 6 Northern Colorado +^	8	–	1	11	–	2
No. 16 Nebraska–Omaha +^	8	–	1	9	–	3
No. 7 North Dakota ^	7	–	2	8	–	3
North Dakota State	6	–	3	7	–	4
South Dakota State	5	–	4	6	–	5
Minnesota State	4	–	5	5	–	6
St. Cloud State	3	–	6	3	–	8
Augustana (SD)	2	–	7	4	–	7
South Dakota	1	–	8	3	–	8
Morningside	1	–	8	2	–	7
+ – Conference co-champions; ^ – NCAA Division II playoff participant; Rankings from NCAA Division II Football Committee poll

The 1998 North Dakota Fighting Sioux football team, also known as the Nodaks, was an American football team that represented the University of North Dakota as a member of the North Central Conference (NCC) during the 1998 NCAA Division II football season. Led by Roger Thomas in his 13th and final year as head coach, the Fighting Sioux compiled an overall record of 8–3 with a mark of 7–2 in conference play, placing third in the NCC. North Dakota advanced to the NCAA Division II Football Championship playoffs, losing to Northern Colorado in the first round. The team played home game at Memorial Stadium in Grand Forks, North Dakota.

== Schedule ==
Date	Opponent	Rank	Site	Result	Attendance	Source
September 12	Moorhead State*	No. 16	Memorial Stadium; Grand Forks, ND	W 34–0		
September 19	at South Dakota State	No. 16	Coughlin–Alumni Stadium; Brookings, SD	W 20–6	5,674	
September 26	Morningside	No. T–8	Memorial Stadium; Grand Forks, ND	W 46–7		
October 3	at No. T–18 Nebraska–Omaha	No. 9	Al F. Caniglia Field; [Omaha, NE	L 10–20	6,100	
October 10	Mankato State	No. 20	Memorial Stadium; Grand Forks, ND	W 27–17		
October 17	at North Dakota State	No. 17	Fargodome; Fargo, ND (Nickel Trophy)	W 39–25		
October 24	St. Cloud State	No. 11	Memorial Stadium; Grand Forks, ND	W 31–28 ^{OT}		
October 31	South Dakota	No. 7	Memorial Stadium; Grand Forks, ND (Sitting Bull Trophy)	W 33–14	6,162	
November 7	at Augustana (SD)	No. 7	Howard Wood Field; Sioux Falls, SD	W 35–18		
November 14	Northern Colorado	No. 7	Memorial Stadium; Grand Forks, ND	L 8–14		
November 21	at No. 6 Northern Colorado*	No. 7	Nottingham Field; Greeley, CO (NCAA Division II First Round)	L 24–52		
*Non-conference game; Rankings from AP Poll released prior to the game

== 1999 NFL draft ==
Player	Position	Round	Pick	NFL club
Jim Kleinsasser	Tight end	2	44	Minnesota Vikings
