= 1998 Georgia Southern Eagles football team =

American college football season

1998 Georgia Southern Eagles football

SoCon champion

NCAA Division I-AA Championship Game, L 43–55 vs. UMass
- Conference: Southern Conference

Ranking
- Sports Network: No. 2
- Record: 14–1 (8–0 SoCon)
- Head coach: Paul Johnson (2nd season)
- Offensive coordinator: Mike Sewak (2nd season)
- Offensive scheme: Triple option
- Defensive coordinator: Rusty Russell (2nd season)
- Base defense: 4–3
- Home stadium: Paulson Stadium

1998 Southern Conference football standings
| | Conf. | | | Overall |
| Team | W | | L | W | | L |
|---|---|---|---|---|---|---|
| No. 2 Georgia Southern $^ | 8 | – | 0 | 14 | – | 1 |
| No. 6 Appalachian State ^ | 6 | – | 2 | 10 | – | 3 |
| Western Carolina | 5 | – | 3 | 6 | – | 5 |
| Chattanooga | 4 | – | 4 | 5 | – | 6 |
| The Citadel | 4 | – | 4 | 5 | – | 6 |
| East Tennessee State | 3 | – | 5 | 4 | – | 7 |
| Wofford | 3 | – | 5 | 4 | – | 7 |
| Furman | 3 | – | 5 | 5 | – | 6 |
| VMI | 0 | – | 8 | 1 | – | 10 |
$ – Conference champion; ^ – NCAA Division I-AA playoff participant; Rankings from The Sports Network poll

The 1998 Georgia Southern Eagles football team represented the Georgia Southern University as a member of the Southern Conference (SoCon) during the 1998 NCAA Division I-AA football season. Led by second-year head coach Paul Johnson, the Eagles compiled and overall record of 14–1 with a mark of 8–0 in conference play, winning the SoCon title. Georgia Southern advanced to the NCAA Division I-AA Football Championship playoffs, where they defeated Colgate in the first round, Connecticut in the quarterfinals, and Western Illinois in the semifinals before falling to UMass in the NCAA Division I-AA Championship Game. The Eagles played their home games at Paulson Stadium in Statesboro, Georgia.

== Schedule ==
| Date | Time | Opponent | Rank | Site | Result | Attendance | Source |
|---|---|---|---|---|---|---|---|
| September 5 | | Elon* | No. 6 | Paulson Stadium; Statesboro, GA | W 31–17 | 13,233 | |
| September 12 | | Jacksonville State* | No. 6 | Paulson Stadium; Statesboro, GA | W 51–32 | 10,803 | |
| September 19 | 1:00 pm | Wofford | No. 3 | Paulson Stadium; Statesboro, GA | W 45–10 | 8,649 | |
| September 26 | 12:00 pm | at Chattanooga | No. 3 | Finley Stadium; Chattanooga, TN | W 42–25 | 6,574 | |
| October 3 | 1:00 pm | VMI | No. 3 | Paulson Stadium; Statesboro, GA | W 63–7 | 9,687 | |
| October 10 | | at Western Carolina | No. 2 | E. J. Whitmire Stadium; Cullowhee, NC | W 28–21 | 9,671 | |
| October 17 | | No. 3 Appalachian State | No. 2 | Paulson Stadium; Statesboro, GA | W 37–24 | 20,353 | |
| October 24 | | at The Citadel | No. 1 | Johnson Hagood Stadium; Charleston, SC | W 51–34 | 14,222 | |
| October 31 | | East Tennessee State | No. 1 | Paulson Stadium; Statesboro, GA | W 47–26 | 15,189 | |
| November 7 | | at Furman | No. 1 | Paladin Stadium; Greenville, SC | W 45–17 | 10,201 | |
| November 14 | 1:00 pm | No. 19 South Florida* | No. 1 | Paulson Stadium; Statesboro, GA | W 28–23 | 14,161 | |
| November 28 | | Colgate* | No. 1 | Paulson Stadium; Statesboro, GA (NCAA Division I-AA First Round) | W 49–28 | 7,676 | |
| December 5 | | No. 8 Connecticut* | No. 1 | Paulson Stadium; Statesboro, GA (NCAA Division I-AA Quarterfinal) | W 52–30 | 9,762 | |
| December 12 | | No. 4 Western Illinois* | No. 1 | Paulson Stadium; Statesboro, GA (NCAA Division I-AA Semifinal) | W 42–14 | 11,140 | |
| December 19 | 2:00 pm | vs. No. 12 UMass* | No. 1 | Finley Stadium; Chattanooga, TN (NCAA Division I-AA Championship Game) | L 43–55 | 17,501 | |
*Non-conference game; Rankings from The Sports Network Poll released prior to the game; All times are in Eastern time

== Rankings ==
Ranking movements Legend: ██ Increase in ranking ██ Decrease in ranking ( ) = First-place votes
| | Week | | | | | | | | | | | | | |
| Poll | Pre | 1 | 2 | 3 | 4 | 5 | 6 | 7 | 8 | 9 | 10 | 11 | 12 | Final |
|---|---|---|---|---|---|---|---|---|---|---|---|---|---|---|
| The Sports Network | 6 | 6 | 3 (1) | 3 (1) | 3 (1) | 2 (8) | 2 (9) | 1 (88) | 1 (93) | 1 (95) | 1 (95) | 1 (97) | 1 (84) | 2 |

== Game summaries ==
=== Vs. No. 12 UMass (Division I-AA Championship Game) ===
1998 Division I-AA Championship Game
No. 1 Georgia Southern Eagles vs. No. 12 UMass Minutemen – Game summary

| Quarter | 1 | 2 | 3 | 4 | Total |
|---|---|---|---|---|---|
| No. 1 Eagles | 7 | 14 | 12 | 10 | 43 |
| No. 12 Minutemen | 21 | 17 | 0 | 17 | 55 |

at Finley Stadium • Chattanooga, Tennessee

- Date: December 19
- Game time: 2:00 p.m. EST
- Game attendance: 17,501
- Referee: John W. Keys
- TV: ESPN

Game information
First quarter
- MASS – Marcel Shipp 25-yard run (Jason Cherry kick), 12:56. Minutemen 7–0. Drive: 7 plays, 67 yards, 2:04.
- MASS – Kole Ayi 9-yard fumble return (Jason Cherry kick), 8:29. Minutemen 14–0.
- GASO – Greg Hill 40-yard run (Chris Chambers kick), 7:25. Minutemen 14–7. Drive: 2 plays, 48 yards, 1:08.
- MASS – Adrian Zullo 7-yard pass from Jamie Holston (Jason Cherry kick), 5:04. Minutemen 21–7. Drive: 1 play, 7 yards, 0:07.

Second quarter

- MASS – Jason Cherry 22-yard field goal, 14:46. Minutemen 24–7. Drive: 11 plays, 63 yards, 3:34.
- GASO – Corey Joyner 6-yard pass from Greg Hill (Chris Chambers kick), 10:54. Minutemen 24–14. Drive: 6 plays, 36 yards, 2:11.
- MASS – Todd Bankhead 1-yard run (Jason Cherry kick), 7:17. Minutemen 31–14. Drive: 11 plays, 64 yards, 3:37.
- MASS – Marcel Shipp 4-yard run (Jason Cherry kick), 4:09. Minutemen 38–14. Drive: 5 plays, 26 yards, 1:35.
- GASO – Adrian Peterson 1-yard run (Chris Chambers kick), 2:01. Minutemen 38–21. Drive: 6 plays, 55 yards, 2:08.

Third quarter

- GASO – Adrian Peterson 5-yard run (kick failed), 8:54. Minutemen 38–27. Drive: 13 plays, 78 yards, 6:06.
- GASO – Greg Hill 2-yard run (run failed), 0:41. Minutemen 38–33. Drive: 14 plays, 98 yards, 6:07.

Fourth quarter

- MASS – Kevin Quinlan 2-yard run (Jason Cherry kick), 13:42. Minutemen 45–33. Drive: 5 plays, 72 yards, 1:59.
- MASS – Marcel Shipp 2-yard run (Jason Cherry kick), 11:51. Minutemen 52–33. Drive: 5 plays, 42 yards, 1:35.
- GASO – Chris Chambers 38-yard field goal, 8:39. Minutemen 52–36. Drive: 12 plays, 58 yards, 3:12.
- MASS – Jason Cherry 25-yard field goal, 2:21. Minutemen 55–36. Drive: 7 plays, 13 yards, 3:04.
- GASO – J. R. Revere 29-yard run (Chris Chambers kick), 1:04. Minutemen 55–43. Drive: 8 plays, 60 yards, 1:17.

| Statistics | GASO | MASS |
|---|---|---|
| First downs | 26 | 23 |
| Plays–yards | 86–595 | 77–462 |
| Rushes–yards | 65–457 | 51–303 |
| Passing yards | 138 | 159 |
| Passing: comp–att–int | 10–21–1 | 18–26–0 |
| Turnovers | 7 | 2 |
| Time of possession | 30:48 | 29:12 |

| Team | Category | Player | Statistics |
|---|---|---|---|
| Georgia Southern | Passing | Greg Hill | 8/16, 111 yards, TD, INT |
| Georgia Southern | Rushing | Greg Hill | 29 rushes, 228 yards, 2 TD |
| Georgia Southern | Receiving | Corey Joyner | 6 receptions, 94 yards, TD |
| UMass | Passing | Todd Bankhead | 17/25, 152 yards |
| UMass | Rushing | Marcel Shipp | 35 rushes, 244 yards, 3 TD |
| UMass | Receiving | Jimmy Moore | 6 receptions, 63 yards |
