= 1998 Hampton Pirates football team =

American college football season

1998 Hampton Pirates football

MEAC champion

NCAA Division I-AA First Round, L 34–42 at Connecticut
- Conference: Mid-Eastern Athletic Conference

Ranking
- Sports Network: No. 11
- Record: 9–3 (7–1 MEAC)
- Head coach: Joe Taylor (7th season)
- Offensive coordinator: Donald Hill-Eley (2nd season)
- Defensive coordinator: Alonzo Lee (2nd season)
- Home stadium: Armstrong Stadium

1998 Mid-Eastern Athletic Conference football standings
	Conf.			Overall
Team	W		L	W		L
No. 5 Florida A&M +^	7	–	1	11	–	2
No. 11 Hampton +^	7	–	1	9	–	3
No. 18 Bethune–Cookman	6	–	2	8	–	3
North Carolina A&T	5	–	3	8	–	3
Howard	5	–	3	7	–	4
South Carolina State	3	–	5	5	–	6
Norfolk State	2	–	6	2	–	9
Morgan State	1	–	7	1	–	10
Delaware State	0	–	8	0	–	11
+ – Conference co-champions; ^ – NCAA Division I-AA playoff participant; Rankings from The Sports Network poll

The 1998 Hampton Pirates football team represented Hampton University as a member of the Mid-Eastern Athletic Conference (MEAC) during the 1998 NCAA Division I-AA football season. Led by seventh-year head coach Joe Taylor, the Pirates compiled an overall record of 9–3 with a mark of 7–1 in conference play, winning the MEAC title. Hampton advanced to the NCAA Division I-AA Football Championship playoffs, were the Pirates lost in the first round to Connecticut. The team played home games at Armstrong Stadium in Hampton, Virginia.

== Schedule ==
Date	Opponent	Rank	Site	Result	Attendance	Source
September 5	at No. 17 Florida A&M*	No. 10	Bragg Memorial Stadium; Tallahassee, FL	W 21–14	18,805	
September 12	at No. 20 Howard	No. 10	RFK Stadium; Washington DC (rivalry)	W 38–31		
September 20	North Carolina A&T	No. 5	Armstrong Stadium; Hampton, VA	W 23–10		
September 27	vs. Grambling State*	No. 5	Giants Stadium; East Rutherford, NJ (Whitney Young Memorial Classic)	W 28–15	54,564	
October 10	Liberty	No. 3	Armstrong Stadium; Hampton, VA	W 21–0	3,019	
October 17	Norfolk State*	No. 4	Armstrong Stadium; Hampton, VA	W 59–14		
October 24	at South Carolina State	No. 2	Oliver C. Dawson Stadium; Orangeburg, SC	W 20–7		
October 31	No. 12 William & Mary*	No. 2	Armstrong Stadium; Hampton, VA	L 34–41	10,704	
November 7	Bethune–Cookman	No. 8	Armstrong Stadium; Hampton, VA	L 13–14		
November 15	at Delaware State	No. 14	Alumni Stadium; Dover, DE	W 41–13		
November 22	at Morgan State	No. 10	Hughes Stadium; Baltimore, MD	W 55–0		
November 29	at No. 8 Connecticut*	No. 9	Memorial Stadium; Storrs, CT (NCAA Division I-AA First Round)	L 34–42		
*Non-conference game; Rankings from The Sports Network Poll released prior to the game
