= 1998 Delaware State Hornets football team =

American college football season

1998 Delaware State Hornets football
- Conference: Mid-Eastern Athletic Conference
- Record: 0–11 (0–8 MEAC)
- Head coach: John McKenzie (2nd season)
- Home stadium: Alumni Stadium

1998 Mid-Eastern Athletic Conference football standings
	Conf.			Overall
Team	W		L	W		L
No. 5 Florida A&M +^	7	–	1	11	–	2
No. 11 Hampton +^	7	–	1	9	–	3
No. 18 Bethune–Cookman	6	–	2	8	–	3
North Carolina A&T	5	–	3	8	–	3
Howard	5	–	3	7	–	4
South Carolina State	3	–	5	5	–	6
Norfolk State	2	–	6	2	–	9
Morgan State	1	–	7	1	–	10
Delaware State	0	–	8	0	–	11
+ – Conference co-champions; ^ – NCAA Division I-AA playoff participant; Rankings from The Sports Network poll

The 1998 Delaware State Hornets football team represented Delaware State University as a member of the Mid-Eastern Athletic Conference (MEAC) during the 1998 NCAA Division I-AA football season. Led by second-year head coach John McKenzie, the Hornets compiled an overall record of 0–11, with a mark of 0–8 in conference play, and finished ninth in the MEAC.

== Schedule ==
Date	Opponent	Site	Result	Attendance	Source
September 5	at No. 14 Hofstra*	Hofstra Stadium; Hempstead, NY	L 0–68	7,129	
September 12	at Elon*	Burlington Memorial Stadium; Burlington, NC	L 15–37		
September 19	at Norfolk State	William "Dick" Price Stadium; Norfolk, VA	L 26–38		
October 3	No. 16 Florida A&M	Alumni Stadium; Dover, DE	L 21–56		
October 10	at Bethune–Cookman	Municipal Stadium; Daytona Beach, FL	L 8–50	10,678	
October 17	Liberty*	Alumni Stadium; Dover, DE	L 21–53		
October 24	at Morgan State	Ravens Stadium at Camden Yards; Baltimore, MD	L 13–15	25,180	
October 31	South Carolina State	Alumni Stadium; Dover, DE	L 14–31		
November 7	North Carolina A&T	Alumni Stadium; Dover, DE	L 15–47		
November 15	No. 14 Hampton	Alumni Stadium; Dover, DE	L 13–41	1,641	
November 21	at Howard	William H. Greene Stadium; Washington, DC	L 43–46		
*Non-conference game; Rankings from The Sports Network Poll released prior to the game
