= 1998 Samford Bulldogs football team =

American college football season

1998 Samford Bulldogs football
- Conference: Independent
- Record: 6–5
- Head coach: Pete Hurt (5th season)
- Offensive coordinator: Roger Carr (5th season)
- Defensive coordinator: Pete Hurt (6th season)
- Home stadium: Seibert Stadium

1998 NCAA Division I-AA independents football standings
	Conf.			Overall
Team	W		L	W		L
Morehead State		–		9	–	2
Davidson		–		8	–	2
No. 20 Hofstra		–		8	–	3
No. 22 South Florida		–		8	–	3
No. 19 Western Kentucky		–		7	–	4
Samford		–		6	–	5
Liberty		–		5	–	6
Southern Utah		–		5	–	6
Austin Peay		–		4	–	7
Buffalo		–		4	–	7
Jacksonville		–		4	–	5
La Salle		–		3	–	6
Cal Poly		–		3	–	8
Charleston Southern		–		3	–	8
Saint Mary's		–		2	–	8
Rankings from The Sports Network poll

The 1998 Samford Bulldogs football team represented Samford University as an independent during the 1998 NCAA Division I-AA football season. Led by fifth-year head coach Pete Hurt, the Bulldogs compiled an overall record of 6–5. The team played home games at Seibert Stadium in Homewood, Alabama.

== Schedule ==
Date	Time	Opponent	Site	Result	Attendance	Source
September 3	6:00 p.m.	at Chattanooga	Finley Stadium; Chattanooga, TN	L 13–23	9,778	
September 12		Austin Peay	Seibert Stadium; Homewood, AL	W 47–7		
September 19		at Furman	Paladin Stadium; Greenville, SC	L 24–34	8,101	
September 26		at No. 20 Troy State	Veterans Memorial Stadium; Troy, AL	L 23–27	16,574	
October 3		Nicholls State	Seibert Stadium; Homewood, AL	W 17–16	4,541	
October 10		Tennessee–Martin^{†}	Seibert Stadium; Homewood, AL	W 24–13	4,843	
October 17	2:00 p.m.	at Jacksonville State	Paul Snow Stadium; Jacksonville, AL (rivalry)	L 0–21	12,789	
October 31		Mars Hill	Seibert Stadium; Homewood, AL	W 20–2	2,411	
November 7		Morgan State	Seibert Stadium; Homewood, AL	W 13–12	4,003	
November 14		at Elon	Burlington Memorial Stadium; Burlington, NC	L 0–36		
November 21		at Tennessee Tech	Tucker Stadium; Cookeville, TN	W 22–12		
^{†}Homecoming; Rankings from The Sports Network Poll released prior to the game; All times are in Central time
