= 1998 South Florida Bulls football team =

American college football season

1998 South Florida Bulls football
- Conference: Independent
- Record: 8–3
- Head coach: Jim Leavitt (2nd season)
- Offensive coordinator: Mike Canales (2nd season)
- Offensive scheme: Pro-style
- Defensive coordinator: Rick Kravitz (2nd season)
- Base defense: 3–4
- Home stadium: Tampa Stadium; Raymond James Stadium

1998 NCAA Division I-AA independents football standings
| | Conf. | | | Overall |
| Team | W | | L | W | | L |
|---|---|---|---|---|---|---|
| Morehead State | | – | | 9 | – | 2 |
| Davidson | | – | | 8 | – | 2 |
| No. 20 Hofstra | | – | | 8 | – | 3 |
| No. 22 South Florida | | – | | 8 | – | 3 |
| No. 19 Western Kentucky | | – | | 7 | – | 4 |
| Samford | | – | | 6 | – | 5 |
| Liberty | | – | | 5 | – | 6 |
| Southern Utah | | – | | 5 | – | 6 |
| Austin Peay | | – | | 4 | – | 7 |
| Buffalo | | – | | 4 | – | 7 |
| Jacksonville | | – | | 4 | – | 5 |
| La Salle | | – | | 3 | – | 6 |
| Cal Poly | | – | | 3 | – | 8 |
| Charleston Southern | | – | | 3 | – | 8 |
| Saint Mary's | | – | | 2 | – | 8 |
Rankings from The Sports Network poll

The 1998 South Florida Bulls football team represented the University of South Florida (USF) as an independent during the 1998 NCAA Division I-AA football season. Led by second-year head coach Jim Leavitt, the Bulls compiled a record of 8–3. South Florida played home games at Tampa Stadium and Raymond James Stadium in Tampa, Florida.

== Schedule ==
| Date | Time | Opponent | Rank | Site | TV | Result | Attendance | Source |
|---|---|---|---|---|---|---|---|---|
| September 5 | 7:00 p.m. | No. 12 (D-II) Slippery Rock | | Tampa Stadium; Tampa, FL | | W 39–10 | 21,553 | |
| September 12 | 7:00 p.m. | Valparaiso | | Tampa Stadium; Tampa, FL | SCF | W 51–0 | 21,467 | |
| September 19 | 7:30 p.m. | at Liberty | | Williams Stadium; Lynchburg, VA | WTOG | W 24–21 | 11,689 | |
| October 3 | 7:00 p.m. | The Citadel | No. 23 | Raymond James Stadium; Tampa, FL | WTOG | W 45–6 | 32,598 | |
| October 10 | 7:00 p.m. | Elon | No. 19 | Raymond James Stadium; Tampa, FL | | W 35–7 | 26,541 | |
| October 17 | 7:00 p.m. | No. 19 Western Kentucky | No. 12 | Raymond James Stadium; Tampa, FL | WTOG | L 24–31 | 30,083 | |
| October 24 | 1:00 p.m. | at No. 20 Hofstra | No. 14 | James M. Shuart Stadium; Hempstead, NY | SCF | L 30–50 | 4,298 | |
| October 31 | 1:30 p.m. | at Charleston Southern | No. 20 | Buccaneer Field; Charleston, SC | | W 24–0 | 884 | |
| November 7 | 7:00 p.m. | Cumberland (TN)^{†} | No. 20 | Raymond James Stadium; Tampa, FL | | W 69–3 | 31,272 | |
| November 14 | 1:00 p.m. | at No. 1 Georgia Southern | No. 19 | Paulson Stadium; Statesboro, GA | SCF | L 23–28 | 14,161 | |
| November 21 | 7:00 p.m. | Morehead State | No. 21 | Raymond James Stadium; Tampa, FL | SCF | W 38–22 | 26,488 | |
^{†}Homecoming; Rankings from The Sports Network Poll released prior to the game; All times are in Eastern time
