= 1998 Bethune–Cookman Wildcats football team =

American college football season

1998 Bethune–Cookman Wildcats football

Heritage Bowl, L 2–28 vs. Southern
- Conference: Mid-Eastern Athletic Conference

Ranking
- Sports Network: No. 18
- Record: 8–3 (6–2 MEAC)
- Head coach: Alvin Wyatt (2nd season)
- Home stadium: Municipal Stadium

1998 Mid-Eastern Athletic Conference football standings
	Conf.			Overall
Team	W		L	W		L
No. 5 Florida A&M +^	7	–	1	11	–	2
No. 11 Hampton +^	7	–	1	9	–	3
No. 18 Bethune–Cookman	6	–	2	8	–	3
North Carolina A&T	5	–	3	8	–	3
Howard	5	–	3	7	–	4
South Carolina State	3	–	5	5	–	6
Norfolk State	2	–	6	2	–	9
Morgan State	1	–	7	1	–	10
Delaware State	0	–	8	0	–	11
+ – Conference co-champions; ^ – NCAA Division I-AA playoff participant; Rankings from The Sports Network poll

The 1998 Bethune–Cookman Wildcats football team represented Bethune–Cookman College (now known as Bethune–Cookman University) as a member of the Mid-Eastern Athletic Conference (MEAC) during the 1998 NCAA Division I-AA football season. Led by second-year head coach Alvin Wyatt, the Wildcats compiled an overall record of 8–3, with a mark of 6–2 in conference play, and finished third in the MEAC.

== Schedule ==
Date	Opponent	Rank	Site	Result	Attendance	Source
September 5	vs. Savannah State*		Alltel Stadium; Jacksonville, FL	W 14–7	13,760	
September 12	at Morgan State		Hughes Stadium; Baltimore, MD	W 25–20	1,000	
September 26	Virginia State*		Municipal Stadium; Daytona Beach, FL	W 63–57 ^{8OT}	6,278	
October 3	vs. Howard		RCA Dome; Indianapolis, IN (Circle City Classic)	L 25–32	52,672	
October 10	Delaware State		Municipal Stadium; Daytona Beach, FL	W 50–8	10,678	
October 17	at South Carolina State		Oliver C. Dawson Stadium; Orangeburg, SC	W 28–17		
October 31	at North Carolina A&T		Aggie Stadium; Greensboro, NC	W 34–27 ^{OT}		
November 7	at No. 8 Hampton		Armstrong Stadium; Hampton, VA	W 14–13	15,165	
November 14	Norfolk State	No. 18	Municipal Stadium; Daytona Beach, FL	W 59–38		
November 21	vs. No. 4 Florida A&M	No. 18	Florida Citrus Bowl; Orlando, FL (Florida Classic)	L 14–50	66,245	
December 26	vs. No. 14 Southern*	No. 18	Georgia Dome; Atlanta, GA (Heritage Bowl)	L 2–28	32,955	
*Non-conference game; Rankings from The Sports Network Poll released prior to the game
