= 1998 Liberty Flames football team =

American college football season

1998 Liberty Flames football
- Conference: Independent
- Record: 5–6
- Head coach: Sam Rutigliano (10th season)
- Home stadium: Williams Stadium

1998 NCAA Division I-AA independents football standings
	Conf.			Overall
Team	W		L	W		L
Morehead State		–		9	–	2
Davidson		–		8	–	2
No. 20 Hofstra		–		8	–	3
No. 22 South Florida		–		8	–	3
No. 19 Western Kentucky		–		7	–	4
Samford		–		6	–	5
Liberty		–		5	–	6
Southern Utah		–		5	–	6
Austin Peay		–		4	–	7
Buffalo		–		4	–	7
Jacksonville		–		4	–	5
La Salle		–		3	–	6
Cal Poly		–		3	–	8
Charleston Southern		–		3	–	8
Saint Mary's		–		2	–	8
Rankings from The Sports Network poll

The 1998 Liberty Flames football team represented Liberty University as an independent during the 1998 NCAA Division I-AA football season. Led by tenth-year head coach Sam Rutigliano, the Flames compiled an overall record of 5–6.

== Schedule ==
Date	Time	Opponent	Site	Result	Attendance	Source
September 5		at Appalachian State	Kidd Brewer Stadium; Boone, NC	L 19–28	13,161	
September 19	7:30 p.m.	South Florida	Williams Stadium; Lynchburg, VA	L 21–24	11,689	
September 26		Glenville State	Williams Stadium; Lynchburg, VA	W 21–7		
October 3	7:30 p.m.	Charleston Southern	Williams Stadium; Lynchburg, VA	W 28–21 ^{OT}	12,623	
October 10		at No. 3 Hampton	Armstrong Stadium; Hampton, VA	L 0–21	3,019	
October 17		at Delaware State	Alumni Stadium; Dover, DE	W 53–21		
October 24		Buffalo	Williams Stadium; Lynchburg, VA	W 27–24 ^{OT}	10,831	
October 31		at Elon	Burlington Memorial Stadium; Burlington, NC	L 14–36		
November 7		Norfolk State	Williams Stadium; Lynchburg, VA	W 45–12	7,321	
November 14		at Hofstra	Hofstra Stadium; Hempstead, NY	L 24–38		
November 21		at Cal Poly	Mustang Stadium; San Luis Obispo, CA	L 35–45		
Rankings from The Sports Network Poll released prior to the game; All times are in Eastern time
