= Ted Cain =

American football player and coach

Biographical details
- Born: c. 1952

Playing career
- 1971–1973: Furman
- Position: Tight end

Coaching career (HC unless noted)
- 1977–1985: Furman (assistant)
- 1986–1992: NC State (OC/TE)
- 1993–1995: NC State (OC/QB)
- 1996: NC State (OC/TE/OT)
- 1997–1998: VMI
- 2001–2009: Vanderbilt (OC/TE)
- 2009–2010: Vanderbilt (ST/TE)

Head coaching record
- Overall: 1–20

Ted Cain (born c. 1952) is an American former college football coach. He is the former offensive coordinator, former special teams coordinator, and former tight-ends coach at Vanderbilt. He was at Vanderbilt as offensive coordinator and tight ends coach for nine years under head coach Bobby Johnson whom he followed to Vanderbilt from Furman, his alma mater, and later as tight-ends coach and special teams coordinator under head coach Robbie Caldwell. He coached standouts Jay Cutler and Earl Bennett, both of whom were voted All-SEC during their time in Nashville. Cain started his career in 1977 at Furman and remained there until the 1986 season, where he took over as NC State's offensive coordinator and tight ends coach. He served as offensive coordinator until the 1997 season, when he was hired as the head football coach at Virginia Military Institute (VMI).

Cain was the 27th head coach at VMI for two seasons, from 1997 until 1998. His career coaching record at VMI was 1-20. He rejoined the staff at Furman following his dismissal.

Cain joined Johnson for the 2002 season at Vanderbilt as offensive coordinator and tight ends coach. During his time as offensive coordinator, he coached some of the best Vanderbilt offenses in school history, most notably the 2005 offense, led by quarterback Jay Cutler. However, after Cutler's departure, the Vanderbilt offense stagnated. Despite this, after the 2008 season, Cain was named assistant head coach, offense. The following year though, on February 11, 2010, after the conclusion of the 2009 football season, and possibly Cain's worst offense, Johnson announced Cain was relieved of his offensive coordinator duties and was reassigned as tight ends and special teams coach. He remained in this capacity under Johnson's successor, Robbie Caldwell, for the 2010 season. After Caldwell's resignation following the season, Cain was not retained by Caldwell's successor, James Franklin.

== Head coaching record ==
Year	Team	Overall	Conference	Standing	Bowl/playoffs
VMI Keydets (Southern Conference) (1997–1998)
1997	VMI	0–11	0–8	9th	
1998	VMI	1–9	0–7	9th	
VMI:		1–20	0–15		
Total:		1–20			
