= Missouri Western–Northwest Missouri State football rivalry =

American college football rivalry

- Missouri Western Griffons Northwest Missouri State Bearcats
- First meeting: September 19, 1981; Missouri Western, 20–8
- Latest meeting: November 8, 2025; Northwest Missouri State, 38–7
- Next meeting: 2026

Statistics
- Total meetings: 46
- All-time series: Northwest Missouri State leads, 34–12
- Largest victory: Northwest Missouri State, 42–0 (2010)
- Longest win streak: Northwest Missouri State, 12 (2013–present)
- Current win streak: Northwest Missouri State, 12 (2013–present)

The Missouri Western–Northwest Missouri State football rivalry between the Missouri Western Griffons football team and Northwest Missouri State Bearcats football team is between two Mid-America Intercollegiate Athletics Association NCAA Division II rivals that are less than 50 miles apart.

The schools off the field are constantly competing for state funds in the same market ever since Missouri Western expanded from a junior college to a four-year college in 1969 fulfilling a Missouri governor Warren Hearnes campaign promise to build the school St. Joseph, Missouri (2000 population 73,912). At the time Northwest at Maryville (2000 population 10,581) founded in 1905 was the sole four-year state college in northwest Missouri.

In 1988, the state under John Ashcroft recommended that Northwest be closed altogether.

In the wake of the ultimately abandoned proposal, both schools have considerably ramped up their football programs with Northwest appearing in ten NCAA Division II National Football Championships (winning six) while Missouri Western has hosted the Kansas City Chiefs summer training camp starting since 2010.

The rivalry on the field is a big draw. The biggest crowds at Spratt Stadium are 10,129 in 2009 and 9,007 in 2007. A crowd of 9,346 attended the September 13, 2008, game—the second biggest at Northwest's Bearcat Stadium. The 2010 game was attended by 10,805 the biggest in the stadium history.

== Game results ==
Missouri Western victories	Northwest Missouri State victories

No.	Date	Location	Winner	Score
1	September 19, 1981	St. Joseph, MO	Missouri Western	20–8
2	September 18, 1982	Maryville, MO	Missouri Western	17–14
3	September 17, 1983	St. Joseph, MO	Northwest Missouri State	19–9
4	September 22, 1984	Maryville, MO	Northwest Missouri State	30–27
5	September 21, 1985	St. Joseph, MO	Northwest Missouri State	24–18
6	September 20, 1986	Maryville, MO	Missouri Western	27–16
7	September 19, 1987	St. Joseph, MO	Northwest Missouri State	20–17
8	September 17, 1988	Pittsburg, KS	Missouri Western	27–16
9	September 2, 1989	St. Joseph, MO	Northwest Missouri State	45–29
10	September 1, 1990	Maryville, MO	Missouri Western	47–25
11	October 26, 1991	St. Joseph, MO	Northwest Missouri State	49–26
12	October 24, 1992	Maryville, MO	Northwest Missouri State	43–26
13	September 18, 1993	St. Joseph, MO	Missouri Western	21–14
14	September 17, 1994	Maryville, MO	Missouri Western	20–0
15	September 14, 1995	St. Joseph, MO	Missouri Western	24–20
16	October 19, 1996	Maryville, MO	Northwest Missouri State	31–24
17	September 27, 1997	St. Joseph, MO	Northwest Missouri State	52–13
18	September 26, 1998	Maryville, MO	Northwest Missouri State	45–32
19	October 9, 1999	St. Joseph, MO	Northwest Missouri State	38–34
20	October 7, 2000	Maryville, MO	Northwest Missouri State	46–27
21	November 3, 2001	St. Joseph, MO	Missouri Western	37–30
22	November 9, 2002	Maryville, MO	Northwest Missouri State	13–10
23	October 25, 2003	St. Joseph, MO	Missouri Western	30–27
24	October 16, 2004	Maryville, MO	Northwest Missouri State	31–13

No.	Date	Location	Winner	Score
25	September 17, 2005	St. Joseph, MO	Northwest Missouri State	31–21
26	September 23, 2006	Maryville, MO	Northwest Missouri State	24–21
27	September 15, 2007	St. Joseph, MO	Northwest Missouri State	44–20
28	September 13, 2008	Maryville, MO	Northwest Missouri State	42–35
29	October 3, 2009	St. Joseph, MO	Northwest Missouri State	49–35
30	October 2, 2010	Maryville, MO	Northwest Missouri State	42–0
31	November 20, 2010	Maryville, MO	Northwest Missouri State	28–24^{A}
32	November 5, 2011	St. Joseph, MO	Missouri Western	31–28
33	November 19, 2011	St. Joseph, MO	Northwest Missouri State	35–29^{A}
34	November 10, 2012	Maryville, MO	Missouri Western	21–20
35	November 16, 2013	St. Joseph, MO	Northwest Missouri State	51–21
36	November 1, 2014	Maryville, MO	Northwest Missouri State	40–3
37	October 31, 2015	St. Joseph, MO	Northwest Missouri State	24–10
38	November 12, 2016	Maryville, MO	Northwest Missouri State	44–3
39	November 11, 2017	St. Joseph, MO	Northwest Missouri State	30–0
40	August 30, 2018	Maryville, MO	Northwest Missouri State	28–6
41	September 5, 2019	St. Joseph, MO	Northwest Missouri State	45–35
42	October 2, 2021	St. Joseph, MO	Northwest Missouri State	30–7
43	October 1, 2022	Maryville, MO	Northwest Missouri State	16–3
44	October 14, 2023	St. Joseph, MO	Northwest Missouri State	27–23
45	November 9, 2024	St. Joseph, MO	Northwest Missouri State	33–23
46	November 8, 2025	Maryville, MO	Northwest Missouri State	38–7
Series: Northwest Missouri State leads 34–12

^{A} During the 2010 and 2011 college football seasons, the Griffons and Bearcats played twice; in this case, the second meeting was in the playoffs.

== See also ==
- List of NCAA college football rivalry games
