= 1998 Charleston Southern Buccaneers football team =

American college football season

1998 Charleston Southern Buccaneers football
- Conference: Independent
- Record: 3–8
- Head coach: David Dowd (8th season)
- Defensive coordinator: Todd Knight (1st season)
- Home stadium: Buccaneer Field

1998 NCAA Division I-AA independents football standings
	Conf.			Overall
Team	W		L	W		L
Morehead State		–		9	–	2
Davidson		–		8	–	2
No. 20 Hofstra		–		8	–	3
No. 22 South Florida		–		8	–	3
No. 19 Western Kentucky		–		7	–	4
Samford		–		6	–	5
Liberty		–		5	–	6
Southern Utah		–		5	–	6
Austin Peay		–		4	–	7
Buffalo		–		4	–	7
Jacksonville		–		4	–	5
La Salle		–		3	–	6
Cal Poly		–		3	–	8
Charleston Southern		–		3	–	8
Saint Mary's		–		2	–	8
Rankings from The Sports Network poll

The 1998 Charleston Southern Buccaneers football team represented Charleston Southern University as an independent during the 1998 NCAA Division I-AA football season. Led by eighth-year head coach David Dowd, the Buccaneers compiled a record of 3–8. Charleston Southern played home games at Buccaneer Field in North Charleston, South Carolina.

== Schedule ==
Date	Time	Opponent	Site	Result	Attendance	Source
September 5	1:30 pm	South Carolina State	Buccaneer Field; North Charleston, SC	L 7–17	5,750	
September 12	1:30 pm	at Presbyterian	Bailey Stadium; Clinton, SC	L 0–42	1,152	
September 19	1:30 pm	North Greenville	Buccaneer Field; North Charleston, SC	W 55–37	1,934	
September 26	7:00 pm	at Wofford	Gibbs Stadium; Spartanburg, SC	L 0–20	5,896	
October 3	7:30 pm	at Liberty	Williams Stadium; Lynchburg, VA	L 21–28 ^{OT}	12,623	
October 10	1:30 pm	Newberry	Buccaneer Field; North Charleston, SC	L 25–28	2,396	
October 17	4:00 pm	at Austin Peay	Governors Stadium; Clarksville, TN	W 17–14	4,221	
October 31	1:30 pm	No. 20 South Florida	Buccaneer Field; North Charleston, SC	L 0–24	884	
November 7	1:30 pm	Morehead State	Buccaneer Field; North Charleston, SC	L 20–27	781	
November 14		Bethel (TN)	Buccaneer Field; North Charleston, SC	W 71–0		
November 21		at East Tennessee State	Memorial Center; Johnson City, TN	L 29–41		
Rankings from The Sports Network Poll released prior to the game; All times are in Eastern time
