= 1998 Western Kentucky Hilltoppers football team =

American college football season

1998 Western Kentucky Hilltoppers football
- Conference: Independent

Ranking
- Sports Network: No. 19
- Record: 7–4
- Head coach: Jack Harbaugh (10th season)
- Home stadium: L. T. Smith Stadium

1998 NCAA Division I-AA independents football standings
	Conf.			Overall
Team	W		L	W		L
Morehead State		–		9	–	2
Davidson		–		8	–	2
No. 20 Hofstra		–		8	–	3
No. 22 South Florida		–		8	–	3
No. 19 Western Kentucky		–		7	–	4
Samford		–		6	–	5
Liberty		–		5	–	6
Southern Utah		–		5	–	6
Austin Peay		–		4	–	7
Buffalo		–		4	–	7
Jacksonville		–		4	–	5
La Salle		–		3	–	6
Cal Poly		–		3	–	8
Charleston Southern		–		3	–	8
Saint Mary's		–		2	–	8
Rankings from The Sports Network poll

The 1998 Western Kentucky Hilltoppers football team represented Western Kentucky University in the 1998 NCAA Division I-AA football season and were led by All-American quarterback Willie Taggart and head coach Jack Harbaugh. This would be the team's last year as an independent, the next year they would rejoin the Ohio Valley Conference as a football only member. The Hilltoppers primarily ran an option offense and were ranked 3rd in rush offense for NCAA Division I-AA. They missed returning to the NCAA Playoffs and finished the season ranked 19th in final 1AA postseason national poll.

Western Kentucky's roster included future NFL players Joseph Jefferson, Rod “He Hate Me” Smart, and Ben Wittman. Patrick Goodman, Andy Hape, and Taggart were named to the AP All American team and Taggart was also named I-AA Independent Offensive Player of the Year. The I-AA Independent All-Star Team included Goodman, Hape, Taggart, Delvechio Walls, Bryan Daniel, and Trae Hackett.

== Schedule ==
Date	Opponent	Rank	Site	Result	Attendance	Source
September 3	Tennessee–Martin	No. 8	L. T. Smith Stadium; Bowling Green, KY	W 49–7	9,000	
September 12	at No. 16 Murray State	No. 7	Roy Stewart Stadium; Murray, KY (Battle for the Red Belt)	L 31–36	12,198	
September 19	No. 16 Eastern Kentucky	No. 15	L. T. Smith Stadium; Bowling Green, KY (Battle of the Bluegrass)	L 16–27	14,200	
September 26	at Austin Peay	No. 24	Fortera Stadium; Clarksville, TN	W 56–14	7,600	
October 3	New Haven	No. 22	L. T. Smith Stadium; Bowling Green, KY	W 24–21	4,600	
October 17	at No. 12 South Florida	No. 19	Raymond James Stadium; Tampa, FL	W 31–24	30,083	
October 24	Elon^{†}	No. 12	L. T. Smith Stadium; Bowling Green, KY	W 41–38 ^{OT}	9,000	
October 31	at Louisville	No. 11	Cardinal Stadium; Louisville, KY	L 34–63	32,649	
November 7	Southern Illinois	No. 18	L. T. Smith Stadium; Bowling Green, KY	W 48–28	4,400	
November 14	Indiana State	No. 15	L. T. Smith Stadium; Bowling Green, KY	W 42–14	4,100	
November 21	at Southwestern Louisiana	No. 13	Cajun Field; Lafayette, LA	L 24–38	5,224	
^{†}Homecoming; Rankings from The Sports Network Poll released prior to the game
