= 1998 NCAA Division II football rankings =

The 1998 NCAA Division II football rankings are from the NCAA Division II football committee. This is for the 1998 season.

== Legend ==
	Increase in ranking
	Decrease in ranking
	Not ranked previous week
(#–#)	Win–loss record
(Italics)	Number of first place votes
т	Tied with team above or below also with this symbol

== NCAA Division II Football Committee poll ==
	Preseason	Week 1 Sept 22	Week 2 Sept 29	Week 3 Oct 6	Week 4 Oct 13	Week 5 Oct 20	Week 6 Oct 27	Week 7 Nov 3	Week 8 Nov 10	
1.	Northern Colorado (4)	Northern Colorado (3–0) (4)	Northern Colorado (4–0) (4)	Northern Colorado (5–0) (4)	Northern Colorado (6–0) (4)	Northern Colorado (7–0) (4)	Central Oklahoma (8–0) (4)	Central Oklahoma (9–0) (4)	Central Oklahoma (10–0) (4)	1.
2.	UC Davis	UC Davis (3–0)	IUP (4–0)	IUP (5–0)	Central Oklahoma (6–0)	Central Oklahoma (7–0)	Northwest Missouri State (8–0)	Northwest Missouri State (9–0)	Northwest Missouri State (10–0)	2.
3.	Carson–Newman	Southern Arkansas (3–0)	Central Oklahoma (4–0)	Central Oklahoma (5–0)	Northwest Missouri State (6–0)	Grand Valley State (7–0) т	Carson–Newman (6–1)	Carson–Newman (7–1)	Carson–Newman (9–1)	3.
4.	New Haven	IUP (3–0)	Northwest Missouri State (4–0)	Northwest Missouri State (5–0)	Grand Valley State (6–0)	Northwest Missouri State (7–0) т	UC Davis (7–1) т	UC Davis (8–1)	UC Davis (9–1)	4.
5.	Pittsburg State	Central Oklahoma (3–0) т	North Alabama (2–1)	North Alabama (3–1)	UC Davis (5–1)	Carson–Newman (6–1) т	Slippery Rock (7–1) т	Slippery Rock (8–1)	Slippery Rock (9–1)	5.
6.	Texas A&M–Kingsville	Northwest Missouri State (3–0) т	Grand Valley State (4–0)	Grand Valley State (5–0) т	Carson–Newman (5–1)	UC Davis (6–1) т	Northern Colorado (7–1)	Northern Colorado (8–1)	Northern Colorado (9–1)	6.
7.	North Dakota State	North Alabama (1–1)	UC Davis (3–1)	UC Davis (4–1) т	Slippery Rock (5–1)	Slippery Rock (6–1)	North Dakota (6–1)	North Dakota (7–1)	North Dakota (8–1)	7.
8.	Albany State	Grand Valley State (3–0) т	Carson–Newman (3–1)	Carson–Newman (4–1)	West Texas A&M (5–1)	Fort Valley State (7–0) т	IUP (7–1)	IUP (8–1)	IUP (9–1)	8.
9.	Northwest Missouri State	North Dakota (2–0) т	North Dakota (3–0)	West Texas A&M (4–1)	Fort Valley State (6–0)	West Texas A&M (6–1) т	Southern Arkansas (6–1)	Albany State (8–1)	Albany State (9–1)	9.
10.	Southern Arkansas	Carson–Newman (2–1) т	West Texas A&M (3–1)	Slippery Rock (4–1)	Central Missouri State (6–0)	West Georgia (7–0)	Grand Valley State (7–1)	Emporia State (8–1)	Emporia State (9–1)	10.
11.	Grand Valley State	West Texas A&M (2–0) т	Emporia State (4–0)	Fort Valley State (5–0)	Eastern New Mexico (6–0) т	North Dakota (5–1)	Emporia State (7–1)	Texas A&M–Kingsville (7–2)	Texas A&M–Kingsville (8–2)	11.
12.	Slippery Rock	Emporia State (2–1)	Slippery Rock (3–1)	Central Missouri State (5–0)	Nebraska–Omaha (5–1) т	Eastern New Mexico (7–0)	Albany State (7–1)	Fort Valley State (8–1)	Fort Valley State (9–1)	12.
13.	Central Oklahoma	Slippery Rock (2–1)	Fort Valley State (5–0)	Eastern New Mexico (5–0)	Saginaw Valley State (6–0)	IUP (6–1)	Texas A&M–Kingsville (6–2)	Shepherd (7–1)	Shepherd (8–1)	13.
14.	North Alabama	Eastern New Mexico (3–0)	Eastern New Mexico (4–0)	Nebraska–Omaha (4–1)	West Georgia (5–1)	Southern Arkansas (5–1)	Fort Valley State (7–1)	Grand Valley State (7–2)	Grand Valley State (8–2)	14.
15.	Chadron State	Fort Valley State (2–1)	Southern Arkansas (3–1)	Southern Arkansas (4–1)	Southern Arkansas (4–1)	Emporia State (6–1)	Nebraska–Omaha (6–2)	West Texas A&M (7–2)	West Texas A&M (8–2)	15.
16.	North Dakota	Central Missouri State (3–0) т	Saginaw Valley State (4–0)	Saginaw Valley State (5–0)	Chadron State (5–1)	Saginaw Valley State (6–1)	Eastern New Mexico (7–1)	Nebraska–Omaha (7–2)	Nebraska–Omaha (8–2)	16.
17.	Saginaw Valley State	Saginaw Valley State (3–0) т	Central Missouri State (4–0)	Chadron State (4–1)	North Dakota (4–1)	Albany State (6–1)	West Georgia (7–1)	Delta State (8–1)	Delta State (7–2)	17.
18.	Angelo State	Albany State (3–1) т	Albany State (4–1) т	Emporia State (4–1)	IUP (5–1)	Pittsburg State (5–1)	Shepherd (6–1)	West Georgia (8–1)	West Georgia (9–1)	18.
19.	Virginia State	Nebraska–Omaha (3–0) т	Nebraska–Omaha (3–1) т	Albany State (5–1)	Albany State (5–1) т	Texas A&M–Kingsville (5–1)	Pittsburg State (5–2) т	Eastern New Mexico (7–2) т	Chadron State (8–2)	19.
20.	IUP	Chadron State (2–1)	Chadron State (3–1)	North Dakota (3–1)	Emporia State (5–1) т	Central Missouri State (6–1)	West Texas A&M (6–2) т	Pittsburg State (6–2) т	Winona State (8–2)	20.
	Preseason	Week 1 Sept 22	Week 2 Sept 29	Week 3 Oct 6	Week 4 Oct 13	Week 5 Oct 20	Week 6 Oct 27	Week 7 Nov 3	Week 8 Nov 10	
		Dropped: 4 New Haven; 5 Pittsburg State; 6 Texas A&M–Kingsville; 7 North Dakota State; 18 Angelo State; 19 Virginia State	None	None	Dropped: 5 North Alabama	Dropped: 12 Nebraska–Omaha; 16 Chadron State	Dropped: 16 Saginaw Valley State; 20 Central Missouri State	Dropped: 9 Southern Arkansas	Dropped: 19 Eastern New Mexico; 20 Pittsburg State	
