= List of Tulane Green Wave bowl games =

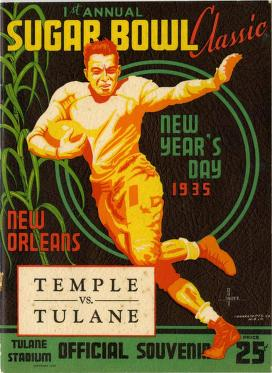
Program for the 1935 Sugar Bowl, the first bowl game that the Green Wave won

The Tulane Green Wave college football team competes as part of the NCAA Division I Football Bowl Subdivision (FBS), representing Tulane University in the American Athletic Conference. Since the establishment of the team in 1893, Tulane has appeared in 17 official bowl games and won 7. Its most recent bowl game was the 2024 Gasparilla Bowl, a 8–33 defeat against the Florida. The 1909 Bacardi Bowl was not sanctioned by the NCAA, and thus the Green Wave do not recognize the bowl appearance.

== Key ==
General
†	Bowl game record attendance
‡	Former bowl game record attendance

Results
W	Win
L	Loss

== Bowl games ==
List of Tulane Green Wave bowl games
#	Bowl	Score	Date	Season	Opponent	Stadium	Location	Attendance	Head coach
1	Bacardi Bowl	L 0–11	January 1, 1910	1909	Havana Athletic Club	La Tropical Stadium	Havana, Cuba		R. R. Brown
2	Rose Bowl	L 12–21	January 1, 1932	1931	USC	Rose Bowl	Pasadena, California	75,562^{‡}	Bernie Bierman
3	Sugar Bowl	W 20–14	January 1, 1935	1934	Temple	Tulane Stadium	New Orleans, Louisiana	22,206^{‡}	Ted Cox
4	Sugar Bowl	L 13–14	January 1, 1940	1939	Texas A&M	Tulane Stadium	New Orleans, Louisiana	73,000^{‡}	Red Dawson
5	Liberty Bowl	W 17–3	December 12, 1970	1970	Colorado	Memphis Memorial Stadium	Memphis, Tennessee	44,640	Jim Pittman
6	Bluebonnet Bowl	L 7–47	December 29, 1973	1973	Houston	Astrodome	Houston, Texas	44,358	Bennie Ellender
7	Liberty Bowl	L 6–9	December 22, 1979	1979	Penn State	Liberty Bowl Memorial Stadium	Memphis, Tennessee	50,021	Larry Smith
8	Hall of Fame Classic	L 15–34	December 27, 1980	1980	Arkansas	Legion Field	Birmingham, Alabama	30,000	Vince Gibson
9	Independence Bowl	L 12–24	December 19, 1987	1987	Washington	Independence Stadium	Shreveport, Louisiana	41,683	Mack Brown
10	Liberty Bowl	W 41–27	December 31, 1998	1998	BYU	Liberty Bowl Memorial Stadium	Memphis, Tennessee	52,192	Chris Scelfo (interim)
11	Hawaiʻi Bowl	W 36–28	December 25, 2002	2002	Hawaiʻi	Aloha Stadium	Honolulu, Hawaii	31,535	Chris Scelfo
12	New Orleans Bowl	L 21–24	December 21, 2013	2013	Louisiana-Lafayette	Mercedes-Benz Superdome	New Orleans, Louisiana	54,728^{‡}	Curtis Johnson
13	Cure Bowl	W 41–24	December 15, 2018	2018	Louisiana-Lafayette	Camping World Stadium	Orlando, Florida	19,066	Willie Fritz
14	Armed Forces Bowl	W 30–13	January 4, 2020	2019	Southern Miss	Amon G. Carter Stadium	Fort Worth, Texas	44,738	Willie Fritz
15	Famous Idaho Potato Bowl	L 27–38	December 22, 2020	2020	Nevada	Albertsons Stadium	Boise, Idaho	0	Willie Fritz
16	Cotton Bowl Classic	W 46–45	January 2, 2023	2022	USC	AT&T Stadium	Arlington, Texas	55,329	Willie Fritz
17	Military Bowl	L 20–41	December 27, 2023	2023	Virginia Tech	Navy–Marine Corps Memorial Stadium	Annapolis, Maryland	35,849	Slade Nagle (interim)
18	Gasparilla Bowl	L 8–33	December 20, 2024	2024	Florida	Raymond James Stadium	Tampa, Florida	41,472	Jon Sumrall
19	CFP First Round	L 10–41	December 20, 2025	2025	Ole Miss	Vaught-Hemingway Stadium	Oxford, Mississippi	68,251	Jon Sumrall
As of 2025 NCAA Division I FBS football season. Scores are sortable first by whether the result was a Tulane win, loss, or tie, and then by the point margin.
