= 1998 Humanitarian Bowl =

Southern Miss Golden Eagles	Idaho Vandals
(7–4)	(8–3)
C-USA	Big West
35	42
Head coach: Jeff Bower	Head coach: Chris Tormey
	1	2	3	4	Total
Southern Miss	13	8	0	14	35
Idaho	7	21	7	7	42
- Date: December 30, 1998
- Season: 1998
- Stadium: Bronco Stadium
- Location: Boise, Idaho
- MVP: John Welsh, QB – Idaho
- Favorite: Southern Miss by 16
- Referee: Nick Define (MAC)
- Attendance: 19,667
- Payout: US$750,000 per team

United States TV coverage
- Network: ESPN2
- Announcers: Wayne Larrivee, Randy Wright

The 1998 Humanitarian Bowl was the second edition of the bowl game, held on December 30 at Bronco Stadium in Boise, Idaho. Played on the blue turf, it featured the Southern Mississippi Golden Eagles and the Idaho Vandals, the champions of the Big West Conference. Idaho was in its first-ever bowl game and upset Southern Miss 42–35, after entering as a 16-point underdog.

It was Idaho's third season back in Division I-A; the Vandals had been in Division I-AA from 1978 through 1995 and were frequently in its postseason. Six weeks earlier, Idaho had defeated rival Boise State on this field by one point, scoring a two-point conversion in overtime to gain their only Big West title. Southern Miss was 5–1 in Conference USA, runner-up to undefeated Tulane; it was their tenth bowl game.

== Game summary ==
Clear skies and a high temperature of 50 °F (10 °C) greeted the teams on this Wednesday afternoon; kickoff was at one o'clock MST and the game was carried by ESPN2. Former Green Bay Packers guard Jerry Kramer, a Vandal from the 1950s, participated in the coin toss.

Idaho fumbled twice early and Southern Miss opened the scoring on a 2-yard touchdown pass from Lee Roberts to Sharrod Gideon. Idaho's Jerome Thomas took the ensuing kickoff 98 yards for a touchdown tying the game at seven. USM's Derrick Nix scored touchdown runs of 8 and 1 yards as Southern Miss took a 21–7 lead with ten minutes remaining in the half. Idaho answered with three touchdown passes from redshirt freshman quarterback John Welsh and the Vandals surged to a 28–21 halftime lead.

With three minutes remaining in the third quarter, running back Joel Thomas's 1-yard touchdown run gave Idaho a 14-point lead at 35–21. In the fourth quarter, Southern Miss got an 8-yard touchdown pass from Gideon to Roberts, then Derrick Nix's 15-yard touchdown run tied the game at 35 with under three seven minutes remaining. The Vandals scored the final points on Welsh's fourth touchdown pass, a 28-yarder to Ryan Prestimonico to win 42–35.

A sack and fumble recovery sealed the victory. With under two minutes left and a first down on Southern Miss's 19-yard line, Idaho head coach Chris Tormey directed his offense to run out the clock, rather than try to run up the score in a show of sportsmanship.

Idaho returned to this bowl in 2009, another close Vandal win, and it became the Famous Idaho Potato Bowl in 2011.
