= 1998 Idaho Vandals football team =

American college football season

1998 Idaho Vandals football

Big West champion Humanitarian Bowl champion

Humanitarian Bowl, W 42–35 vs. Southern Miss
- Conference: Big West Conference
- Record: 9–3 (4–1 Big West)
- Head coach: Chris Tormey (4th season)
- Offensive coordinator: Phil Earley (1st season)
- Offensive scheme: Spread
- Defensive coordinator: Jeff Mills (1st season)
- Base defense: 3–4
- Home stadium: Kibbie Dome

1998 Big West Conference football standings
	Conf.			Overall
Team	W		L	W		L
Idaho $	4	–	1	9	–	3
Nevada	3	–	2	6	–	5
North Texas	3	–	2	3	–	8
Boise State	2	–	3	6	–	5
Utah State	2	–	3	3	–	8
New Mexico State	1	–	4	3	–	8
$ – Conference champion

The 1998 Idaho Vandals football team represented the University of Idaho in the 1998 NCAA Division I-A football season. The Vandals, led by fourth-year head coach Chris Tormey, were members of the Big West Conference and played their home games at the Kibbie Dome, an indoor facility on campus in Moscow, Idaho.

In their third season back in Division I-A, the Vandals won their only Big West title in football and were invited to the Humanitarian Bowl in Boise, in which they defeated the heavily favored Southern Mississippi Golden Eagles of Conference USA. The Vandals were led by redshirt freshman quarterback John Welsh, in his fifth start; his first was at sixth-ranked LSU in late September. The season surpassed all expectations of the team, one publication ranked Idaho last among all Division I-A teams before the start of the season. Idaho began the season with very little experience at quarterback and two new coordinators, both promoted from within. Sophomore Ed Dean was the opening day quarterback, then junior college transfer Greg Robertson started six of the next eight games. He re-injured his shoulder on Halloween, and Welsh took over for the remainder of the season.

In the rivalry game to end the regular season against Boise State, also at Bronco Stadium, Idaho made a two-point conversion in overtime to win the conference title. This was the fifteenth win over the Broncos in the last seventeen games dating back to 1982, but stands as the most recent; the Vandals then dropped a dozen straight to BSU through 2010, the last meeting in the series.

The Big West Conference discontinued football following the 2000 season; this remains Idaho's most recent conference title in football.

== Schedule ==
Date	Time	Opponent	Site	TV	Result	Attendance	Source
September 5	6:05 pm	No. 21 (I-AA) Eastern Washington*	Kibbie Dome; Moscow, ID		W 31–14	10,495	
September 12	6:00 pm	at San Jose State*	Spartan Stadium; San Jose, CA		W 17–12	12,432	
September 19	2:00 pm	at Washington State*	Martin Stadium; Pullman, WA (Battle of the Palouse)		L 16–24	36,770	
September 26	5:00 pm	at No. 6 LSU*	Tiger Stadium; Baton Rouge, LA		L 20–53	80,466	
October 3	3:05 pm	Idaho State*^{†}	Kibbie Dome; Moscow, ID (rivalry)		W 52–3	15,103	
October 10	11:00 am	at Arkansas State*	Indian Stadium; Jonesboro, AR		W 52–14	12,674	
October 17	12:00 pm	at Utah State	Romney Stadium; Logan, UT		W 26–14	14,206	
October 24	3:05 pm	Nevada	Kibbie Dome; Moscow, ID		L 23–58	13,123	
October 31	4:35 pm	at North Texas	Fouts Field; Denton, TX		W 41–23	7,112	
November 14	3:05 pm	New Mexico State	Kibbie Dome; Moscow, ID		W 36–32	14,435	
November 21	12:00 pm	at Boise State	Bronco Stadium; Boise, ID (rivalry)		W 36–35 ^{OT}	30,208	
December 30	12:00 pm	vs. Southern Mississippi*	Bronco Stadium; Boise, ID (Humanitarian Bowl)	ESPN2	W 42–35	19,664	
*Non-conference game; ^{†}Homecoming; Rankings from AP Poll released prior to the game; All times are in Pacific time
