= 1998 Nevada Wolf Pack football team =

American college football season

1998 Nevada Wolf Pack football
- Conference: Big West Conference
- Record: 6–5 (3–2 Big West)
- Head coach: Jeff Tisdel (3rd season)
- Offensive coordinator: Chris Klenakis (2nd season)
- Offensive scheme: Pro-style
- Defensive coordinator: Ken Wilson (3rd season)
- Base defense: 3–4
- Home stadium: Mackay Stadium

1998 Big West Conference football standings
	Conf.			Overall
Team	W		L	W		L
Idaho $	4	–	1	9	–	3
Nevada	3	–	2	6	–	5
North Texas	3	–	2	3	–	8
Boise State	2	–	3	6	–	5
Utah State	2	–	3	3	–	8
New Mexico State	1	–	4	3	–	8
$ – Conference champion

The 1998 Nevada Wolf Pack football team represented the University of Nevada, Reno during the 1998 NCAA Division I-A football season. Nevada competed as a member of the Big West Conference (BWC). The Wolf Pack were led by third–year head coach Jeff Tisdel and played their home games at Mackay Stadium.

== Schedule ==
Date	Time	Opponent	Site	Result	Attendance	Source
September 5	1:00 p.m.	at Oregon State*	Parker Stadium; Coravllis, OR	L 6–48	27,426	
September 12		Colorado State*	Mackay Stadium; Reno, NV	L 14–26	22,882	
September 26	7:00 p.m.	at Fresno State*	Bulldog Stadium; Fresno, CA	W 27–24	39,477	
October 3		at UNLV*	Sam Boyd Stadium; Whitney, NV (Fremont Cannon)	W 31–20	22,006	
October 10		New Mexico State	Mackay Stadium; Reno, NV	L 45–48	23,142	
October 17		at North Texas	Fouts Field; Denton, TX	L 21–27		
October 24	3:00 p.m.	at Idaho	Kibbie Dome; Moscow, ID	W 58–23	13,123	
October 31	6:05 p.m.	Boise State^{†}	Mackay Stadium; Reno, NV (rivalry)	W 52–24	24,279	
November 7		at Utah State	Romney Stadium; Logan, UT	W 26–21	7,500	
November 14		Cal Poly (Div. I-AA)*	Mackay Stadium; Reno, NV	W 63–0	16,828	
November 21		Southern Miss*	Mackay Stadium; Reno, NV	L 28-55	18,336	
*Non-conference game; ^{†}Homecoming; Rankings from AP Poll released prior to the game; All times are in Pacific time
