= 1998 Idaho State Bengals football team =

American college football season

1998 Idaho State Bengals football
- Conference: Big Sky Conference
- Record: 3–8 (2–6 Big Sky)
- Head coach: Tom Walsh (2nd season)
- Home stadium: Holt Arena

1998 Big Sky Conference football standings
	Conf.			Overall
Team	W		L	W		L
No. 15 Montana $^	6	–	2	8	–	4
Cal State Northridge	5	–	3	7	–	4
No. 25 Montana State	5	–	3	7	–	4
Weber State	4	–	4	6	–	5
Eastern Washington	4	–	4	5	–	6
Portland State	4	–	4	5	–	6
Northern Arizona	3	–	5	6	–	5
Sacramento State	3	–	5	5	–	6
Idaho State	2	–	6	3	–	8
$ – Conference champion; ^ – NCAA Division I-AA playoff participant; Rankings from The Sports Network poll

The 1998 Idaho State Bengals football team represented Idaho State University as a member of the Big Sky Conference during the 1998 NCAA Division I-AA football season. Led by second-year head coach Tom Walsh, the Bengals compiled an overall record of 3–8, with a mark of 2–6 in conference play, and finished ninth in the Big Sky.

== Schedule ==
Date	Opponent	Site	Result	Attendance	Source
September 5	at New Mexico*	University Stadium; Albuquerque, NM	L 9–38	28,260	
September 19	Weber State	Holt Arena; Pocatello, ID	L 3–6	7,891	
September 26	at Portland State	Civic Stadium; Portland, OR	W 43–41	7,861	
October 3	at Idaho*	Kibbie Dome; Moscow, ID (rivalry)	L 3–52	15,103	
October 10	at Northern Arizona	Walkup Skydome; Flagstaff, AZ	L 7–30	12,301	
October 17	Eastern Washington	Holt Arena; Pocatello, ID	L 13–44	6,382	
October 24	Southern Utah*	Holt Arena; Pocatello, ID	W 50–33	4,936	
October 31	at Montana	Washington–Grizzly Stadium; Missoula, MT	L 13–40	17,384	
November 7	Sacramento State	Holt Arena; Pocatello, ID	L 13–36	3,412	
November 14	at No. 21 Montana State	Bobcat Stadium; Bozeman, MT	L 35–66	7,017	
November 21	No. 25 Cal State Northridge	Holt Arena; Pocatello, ID	W 32–29	4,151	
*Non-conference game; Rankings from The Sports Network Poll released prior to the game
