= 1998 Weber State Wildcats football team =

American college football season

1998 Weber State Wildcats football
- Conference: Big Sky Conference
- Record: 6–5 (4–4 Big Sky)
- Head coach: Jerry Graybeal (1st season)
- Home stadium: Stewart Stadium

1998 Big Sky Conference football standings
	Conf.			Overall
Team	W		L	W		L
No. 15 Montana $^	6	–	2	8	–	4
Cal State Northridge	5	–	3	7	–	4
No. 25 Montana State	5	–	3	7	–	4
Weber State	4	–	4	6	–	5
Eastern Washington	4	–	4	5	–	6
Portland State	4	–	4	5	–	6
Northern Arizona	3	–	5	6	–	5
Sacramento State	3	–	5	5	–	6
Idaho State	2	–	6	3	–	8
$ – Conference champion; ^ – NCAA Division I-AA playoff participant; Rankings from The Sports Network poll

The 1998 Weber State Wildcats football team represented Weber State University as a member of the Big Sky Conference during the 1998 NCAA Division I-AA football season. Led by first-year head coach Jerry Graybeal, the Wildcats compiled an overall record of 6–5, with a mark of 4–4 in conference play, and finished fourth in the Big Sky.

== Schedule ==
Date	Opponent	Rank	Site	Result	Attendance	Source
September 3	Montana Tech*		Stewart Stadium; Ogden, UT	W 38–7	7,411	
September 12	Humboldt State*		Stewart Stadium; Ogden, UT	W 41–12	8,836	
September 19	at Idaho State		Holt Arena; Pocatello, ID	W 6–3	7,891	
September 26	No. 11 Montana	No. 21	Stewart Stadium; Ogden, UT	W 27–20	16,954	
October 3	at Sacramento State	No. 12	Hornet Stadium; Sacramento, CA	W 27–14	3,516	
October 10	Montana State	No. 9	Stewart Stadium; Ogden, UT	L 7–10	8,002	
October 17	at Boise State*	No. 13	Bronco Stadium; Boise, ID	L 13–24	20,766	
October 24	at Portland State	No. 17	Civic Stadium; Portland, OR	L 27–34	7,214	
October 31	Cal State Northridge	No. 23	Wildcat Stadium; Ogden, UT	L 10–26	5,813	
November 7	at Northern Arizona		Walkup Skydome; Flagstaff, AZ	L 17–20	5,211	
November 14	Eastern Washington		Stewart Stadium; Ogden, UT	W 27–23	5,339	
*Non-conference game; Rankings from The Sports Network Poll released prior to the game
