= 1998 Utah State Aggies football team =

American college football season

1998 Utah State Aggies football
- Conference: Big West Conference
- Record: 3–8 (2–3 Big West)
- Head coach: Dave Arslanian (1st season)
- Offensive coordinator: Rich Ericson (1st season)
- Defensive coordinator: Paul Arslanian (1st season)
- Home stadium: Romney Stadium

1998 Big West Conference football standings
| | Conf. | | | Overall |
| Team | W | | L | W | | L |
|---|---|---|---|---|---|---|
| Idaho $ | 4 | – | 1 | 9 | – | 3 |
| Nevada | 3 | – | 2 | 6 | – | 5 |
| North Texas | 3 | – | 2 | 3 | – | 8 |
| Boise State | 2 | – | 3 | 6 | – | 5 |
| Utah State | 2 | – | 3 | 3 | – | 8 |
| New Mexico State | 1 | – | 4 | 3 | – | 8 |
$ – Conference champion

The 1998 Utah State Aggies football team represented Utah State University in the 1998 NCAA Division I-A football season as a member of the Big West Conference. The Aggies were led by first-year head coach Dave Arslanian, who had been hired from Weber State. The Aggies played their home games at Romney Stadium in Logan, Utah. Utah State finished with a 3–8 record in a difficult first year for Coach Arslanian.

== Schedule ==
| Date | Opponent | Site | Result | Attendance |
|---|---|---|---|---|
| September 5 | Utah* | Romney Stadium; Logan, UT (Battle of the Brothers, Beehive Boot) | L 12–20 | 30,218 |
| September 12 | at New Mexico* | University Stadium; Albuquerque, NM | L 36–39 | 31,267 |
| September 19 | at No. 15 Colorado* | Folsom Field; Boulder, CO | L 6–25 | 45,298 |
| September 26 | Sam Houston State* | Romney Stadium; Logan, UT | W 47–17 | 14,498 |
| October 3 | Oregon State* | Romney Stadium; Logan, UT | L 16–20 | 11,682 |
| October 10 | at Washington* | Husky Stadium; Seattle, WA | L 12–53 | 70,210 |
| October 17 | Idaho | Romney Stadium; Logan, UT | L 14–26 | 14,206 |
| October 24 | at Boise State | Bronco Stadium; Boise, ID | L 16–30 | 19,561 |
| October 31 | at New Mexico State | Aggie Memorial Stadium; Las Cruces, NM | W 29–26 | 13,312 |
| November 7 | Nevada | Romney Stadium; Logan, UT | L 21–26 | 7,500 |
| November 14 | North Texas | Romney Stadium; Logan, UT | W 28–27 | 7,376 |
*Non-conference game; Rankings from Coaches' Poll released prior to the game

== Season summary ==
Utah State finished the 1997 season with a record of 6-6, including a trip to the inaugural Humanitarian Bowl. Following the season, Coach John L. Smith accepted a position with Louisville as the new head football coach. Dave Arslanian was announced as the new head coach of Utah State on December 6, 1997.

The Aggies opened the season against their historical rivals, the Utah Utes. The game marked the 45th consecutive season in which the two teams played each other, but only the eighth time in that span the Aggies came into the game with a winning streak in the series. Replacing most of their significant contributors, as well as the vast majority of the coaching staff, proved to be the difference maker in the game. Despite two Utah State chances late in the game to tie, the Utes won 20-12 to snap a two-game losing streak (and would not lose to the Aggies again until 2012).

After difficult road games at New Mexico and Colorado, the Aggies earned their first win of the Arslanian era by defeating Sam Houston State at home 47-17. More difficult results would follow, however, including a close home losses to Oregon State and eventual Big West champion Idaho. The Aggies record would sink to 1-7 before finishing with two wins in three weeks as they were able to beat New Mexico State on the road and North Texas at home in the season finale. The win against New Mexico State, a double OT thriller, was Utah State's 19th consecutive victory in the series, constituting the longest winning streak the Aggies have enjoyed over any opponent.

== Awards and honors ==
The Aggies had ten players named to either the first or second all-conference team in the Big West.

| Player | Position | Team |
|---|---|---|
| Tony D'Amato | LB | 1ST |
| Brent Passey | LB | 1ST |
| Craig Miller | CB | 1ST |
| Lindsey Hassell | DL | 1ST |
| Walter Fiefia | DL | 1ST |
| Ken Watts | OL | 1ST |
| Brad Bohn | PK | 1ST |
| Robert Scott | WR | 2ND |
| Tony Walker | KR | 2ND |
| Johndale Carty | FS | 2ND |
