= 2002 Tulane Green Wave football team =

American college football season

2002 Tulane Green Wave football
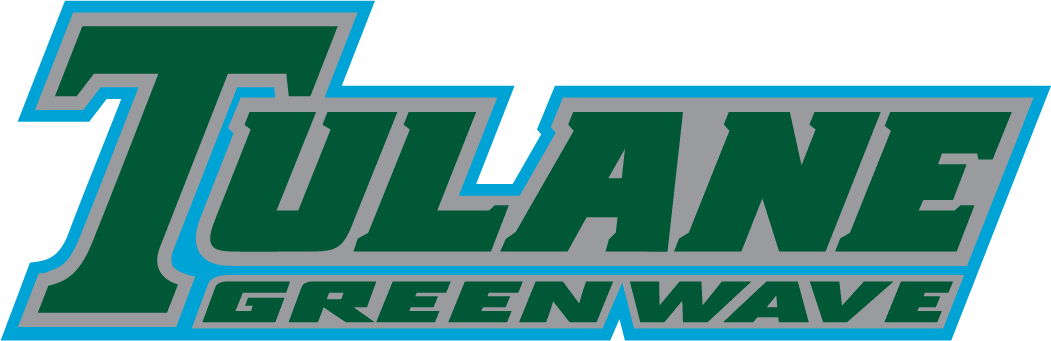

Hawaii Bowl champion

Hawaii Bowl, W 36–28 vs. Hawaii
- Conference: Conference USA
- Record: 8–5 (4–4 C-USA)
- Head coach: Chris Scelfo (4th season)
- Offensive coordinator: Frank Scelfo (2nd season)
- Offensive scheme: Multiple
- Defensive coordinator: Eric Schumann (1st season)
- Base defense: 4–3
- Home stadium: Louisiana Superdome; Tad Gormley Stadium

2002 Conference USA football standings
	Conf.			Overall
Team	W		L	W		L
Cincinnati +	6	–	2	7	–	7
No. 23 TCU +	6	–	2	10	–	2
Louisville	5	–	3	7	–	6
Southern Miss	5	–	3	7	–	6
Tulane	4	–	4	8	–	5
UAB	4	–	4	5	–	7
East Carolina	4	–	4	4	–	8
Houston	3	–	5	5	–	7
Memphis	2	–	6	3	–	9
Army	1	–	7	1	–	11
+ – Conference co-champions; Rankings from AP Poll

The 2002 Tulane Green Wave football team represented the Tulane University in the 2002 college football season. Led by J. P. Losman, the Green Wave won the Hawaii Bowl for the first time in the school's history.

== Schedule ==
Date	Time	Opponent	Site	TV	Result	Attendance	Source
August 31	2:30 pm	Southern*	Louisiana Superdome; New Orleans, LA		W 37–19	40,337	
September 7	7:00 pm	at Houston	Robertson Stadium; Houston, TX		W 34–13	16,307	
September 14	6:00 pm	at East Carolina	Dowdy–Ficklen Stadium; Greenville, NC		L 20–24	35,300	
September 21	7:00 pm	at Memphis	Liberty Bowl Memorial Stadium; Memphis, TN		L 10–38	32,120	
September 28	2:30 pm	No. 3 Texas*	Louisiana Superdome; New Orleans, LA	ESPN Plus	L 0–49	46,678	
October 5	6:00 pm	at Louisiana–Monroe*	Malone Stadium; Monroe, LA		W 52–9	11,645	
October 12	2:30 pm	Cincinnati	Louisiana Superdome; New Orleans, LA		W 35–17	19,575	
October 19	2:30 pm	UAB	Louisiana Superdome; New Orleans, LA		W 35–14	19,343	
October 26	2:30 pm	Navy*^{†}	Tad Gormley Stadium; New Orleans, LA		W 51–30	27,417	
November 9	2:00 pm	at TCU	Amon G. Carter Stadium; Fort Worth, TX		L 10–17	27,694	
November 16	2:30 pm	Army	Louisiana Superdome; New Orleans, LA		L 10–14	19,421	
November 23	2:30 pm	Southern Miss	Louisiana Superdome; New Orleans, LA		W 31–10	21,832	
December 25	7:00 pm	vs. Hawaii*	Aloha Stadium; Halawa, HI (Hawaii Bowl)	ESPN	W 36–28	35,513	
*Non-conference game; ^{†}Homecoming; Rankings from AP Poll released prior to the game; All times are in Central time

== Roster ==
2002 Tulane Green Wave football team roster
Players
Coaches
Offense

Pos.	#	Name	Class
QB	6	Nick Cannon	Fr
QB	7	J. P. Losman	Jr
WR	9	Roydell Williams	Jr
RB	21	Brant Hocke	Jr
WR	25	James Dunn	Jr
RB	26	Mewelde Moore	Jr
OL	60	Seth Zaunbrecher	Sr
OT	73	Joe Mitchell	Jr
WR	80	Chris Bush	So

Defense

Pos.	#	Name	Class
DB	3	Jeff Sanchez	Sr
SS	23	Tra Boger	So
LB	29	Nick Simpson	Sr
DB	30	Darren Sapp	So
LB	36	Anthony Cannon	Fr
LB	46	Blake Baker	So
DE	71	Stephen Segari	Jr
DL	81	Terrence Tarver	Jr
DL	89	Roxie Shelvin	Sr
DE	95	Michael Roberts	Fr

Special teams

Pos.	#	Name	Class
K	47	Seth Marler	Sr

Head coach

- Chris Scelfo

Coordinators/assistant coaches

Legend

- (C) Team captain
- (S) Suspended
- (I) Ineligible
- Injured
- Redshirt

Roster

== Team players in the NFL ==
No Tulane Green Wave players were selected in the 2003 NFL draft. The following finished their college career in 2002, were not drafted, but played in the NFL.

Player	Position	First NFL team
Seth Marler	Kicker	Jacksonville Jaguars
Jeff Sanchez	Cornerback	Dallas Cowboys
