= 1998 Northern Arizona Lumberjacks football team =

American college football season

1998 Northern Arizona Lumberjacks football
- Conference: Big Sky Conference
- Record: 6–5 (3–5 Big Sky)
- Head coach: Jerome Souers (1st season)
- Home stadium: Walkup Skydome

1998 Big Sky Conference football standings
	Conf.			Overall
Team	W		L	W		L
No. 15 Montana $^	6	–	2	8	–	4
Cal State Northridge	5	–	3	7	–	4
No. 25 Montana State	5	–	3	7	–	4
Weber State	4	–	4	6	–	5
Eastern Washington	4	–	4	5	–	6
Portland State	4	–	4	5	–	6
Northern Arizona	3	–	5	6	–	5
Sacramento State	3	–	5	5	–	6
Idaho State	2	–	6	3	–	8
$ – Conference champion; ^ – NCAA Division I-AA playoff participant; Rankings from The Sports Network poll

The 1998 Northern Arizona Lumberjacks football team was an American football team that represented Northern Arizona University (NAU) as a member of the Big Sky Conference (Big Sky) during the 1998 NCAA Division I-AA football season. In their first year under head coach Jerome Souers, the Lumberjacks compiled a 6–5 record (3–5 against conference opponents), outscored opponents by a total of 241 to 227, and tied for seventh place in the Big Sky.

The team played its home games at the J. Lawrence Walkup Skydome, commonly known as the Walkup Skydome, in Flagstaff, Arizona.

== Schedule ==
Date	Opponent	Site	Result	Attendance	Source
September 5	at Cal Poly*	Mustang Stadium; San Luis Obispo, CA	W 9–0	6,538	
September 12	Southwest Texas State*	Walkup Skydome; Flagstaff, AZ	W 38–16	9,471	
September 19	Cal State Northridge	Walkup Skydome; Flagstaff, AZ	L 10–41	7,144	
September 26	Western State (CO)*	Walkup Skydome; Flagstaff, AZ	W 28–9	11,616	
October 3	at Eastern Washington	Woodward Field; Cheney, WA	L 17–21	3,625	
October 10	at Idaho State	Holt Arena; Pocatello, ID	W 30–7	12,301	
October 17	at Montana	Washington–Grizzly Stadium; Missoula, MT	L 20–33	18,594	
October 24	Sacramento State	Walkup Skydome; Flagstaff, AZ	L 21–38	3,991	
October 31	at Montana State	Bobcat Stadium; Bozeman, MT	L 25–32	7,267	
November 7	Weber State	Walkup Skydome; Flagstaff, AZ	W 20–17	5,211	
November 14	at Portland State	Civic Stadium; Portland, OR	W 23–13		
*Non-conference game
