= 1998 Louisville Cardinals football team =

American college football season

1998 Louisville Cardinals football

Motor City Bowl, L 29–48 vs. Marshall
- Conference: Conference USA
- Record: 7–5 (4–2 C–USA)
- Head coach: John L. Smith (1st season)
- Offensive coordinator: Bobby Petrino (1st season)
- Offensive scheme: Multiple
- Defensive coordinator: Chris Smeland (1st season)
- Base defense: 4–3
- Home stadium: Papa John's Cardinal Stadium

1998 Conference USA football standings
	Conf.			Overall
Team	W		L	W		L
No. 7 Tulane $	6	–	0	12	–	0
Southern Miss	5	–	1	7	–	5
Louisville	4	–	2	7	–	5
East Carolina	3	–	3	6	–	5
Army	2	–	4	3	–	8
Houston	2	–	4	3	–	8
Memphis	1	–	5	2	–	9
Cincinnati	1	–	5	2	–	9
$ – Conference champion; Rankings from AP Poll

The 1998 Louisville Cardinals football team represented the University of Louisville as a member of Conference USA (C-USA) during the 1998 NCAA Division I-A football season. Led by first-year head coach John L. Smith, the Cardinals compiled an overall record of 7–5 with a mark of 4–2 in conference play, placing third in C-USA. Louisville was invited to the Motor City Bowl, where the Cardinals lost to Marshall. The team played home game at the newly opened Papa John's Cardinal Stadium in Louisville, Kentucky.

== Schedule ==
Date	Time	Opponent	Site	TV	Result	Attendance	Source
September 5	3:00 pm	Kentucky*	Papa John's Cardinal Stadium; Louisville, KY (Governor's Cup)	FSN	L 34–68	42,643	
September 12	9:00 pm	at Utah*	Rice–Eccles Stadium; Salt Lake City, UT	WDRB	L 22–45	44,112	
September 19	2:00 pm	at Illinois*	Memorial Stadium; Champaign, IL		W 35–9	39,414	
September 26	2:00 pm	Boston College*	Papa John's Cardinal Stadium; Louisville, KY		W 52–28	38,231	
October 3	2:00 pm	Cincinnati	Papa John's Cardinal Stadium; Louisville, KY (The Keg of Nails)		W 62–19	35,479	
October 10	6:00 pm	at Southern Miss	M. M. Roberts Stadium; Hattiesburg, MS	WDRB	L 21–56	22,043	
October 17	3:30 pm	at No. 24 Tulane	Louisiana Superdome; New Orleans, LA	FSN	L 22–28	26,217	
October 24	2:00 pm	Memphis	Papa John's Cardinal Stadium; Louisville, KY (rivalry)		W 35–32	39,247	
October 31	2:00 pm	No. 11 (I-AA) Western Kentucky	Papa John's Cardinal Stadium; Louisville, KY		W 63–34	32,649	
November 14	2:00 pm	at East Carolina	Dowdy–Ficklen Stadium; Greenville, NC		W 63–45	26,258	
November 21	2:00 pm	Army	Papa John's Cardinal Stadium; Louisville, KY		W 35–23	40,349	
December 23	8:00 pm	vs. Marshall*	Pontiac Silverdome; Pontiac, MI (Motor City Bowl)	ESPN	L 29–48	32,206	
*Non-conference game; Rankings from AP Poll released prior to the game; All times are in Eastern time

== Roster ==
- 2 RASHAD HOLMAN DB
- 2 FRANK ZEBICH PK
- 3 ANTONIO ROUNDTREE DB
- 4 BRIAN GAINES CB
- 4 STEVE VEENEMAN PK
- 5 RAFAEL COOPER RB
- 6 IBN GREEN TE
- 7 CHRIS REDMAN QB
- 8 CHARLES SHEFFIELD WR
- 9 CASSWELL GOODMAN LB
- 10 ARNOLD JACKSON WR
- 11 MIKE WATKINS QB
- 12 LAVELL BOYD WR
- 13 GARY GUMM QB
- 14 DAR-SHAY PURRY S
- 15 DAVE RAGONE QB
- 17 OTIS FLOYD LB
- 18 JEFF BRUNELLI QB
- 18 KAELEN MATTHEWS P
- 19 COURTNEY DINKINS S
- 20 BUD HERRING LB
- 22 GREG BRANT DB
- 23 JON HILBERT K
- 24 JAGUAR SANDERS CB
- 25 CALVIN HAMLER S
- 26 LEROY COLLINS RB
- 27 DON BIBB CB
- 28 DEWAYNE TAYLOR S
- 29 JASON WYATT LB
- 30 DAVID ASHBY DB
- 32 FRANK MOREAU RB
- 33 NATE BENNETT PK
- 34 DEREK TRONZO WR
- 35 MICHAEL BROWN LB
- 36 GARRET WILLIAMS RB
- 36 KEVIN WARE DB
- 37 RICO WILLIAMS WR
- 38 JEREMY BORSETH P
- 38 HERB YARBOURGH DB
- 39 ADRIEL WALKER DB
- 40 DAVID WASHINGTON TE
- 41 XAVIER BURRELL S
- 42 TONY STALLINGS LB
- 44 HENRY MILLER RB
- 45 BRETT SHIVELY LB
- 46 ZACH BUTLER DB
- 47 JEFF SHOLLY TE
- 49 KLARENS JONES S
- 50 CRAIG GOTCHER LB
- 51 PJ ZARICZNY C
- 52 RASHAD HARRIS LB
- 53 JEREMY COLLINS LB
- 54 DAN PARDUE OL
- 55 ANDRE COLLINS LB
- 57 ERIN SMITH DE
- 58 TOBY DAWSON DE
- 59 MATT SEXTON DE
- 61 AARON DARDZINSKI OL
- 62 JOSH RICHARDSON OT
- 64 ANTOINE SIMS OL
- 65 ANTHONY BYRD OT
- 69 JON SUSKI OL
- 70 RICK NORD OL
- 71 MARK GRIVNA OT
- 72 ARIEL RODRIGUEZ OL
- 73 RYAN LUNDGARD OL
- 74 MIKE GANTOUS DT
- 75 GEOFF MCBARNETTE OL
- 76 ROB EBLE OT
- 77 JOE OSHAUGHNESSY OL
- 80 ZEK PARKER WR
- 81 JASON JONES TE
- 82 CHIP MATTLINGLY TE
- 84 ALLEN CARROLL WR
- 85 DAMION DORSEY WR
- 86 BRIAN MCDONALD WR
- 87 JUSTIN THOMAS WR
- 89 NAT BINGHAM WR
- 90 REGGIE HARGROVE DE
- 91 BRAXTON ANDERSON DT
- 92 MICHAEL JOSIAH DE
- 93 ANTHONY BONNER DT
- 94 JAMES DENNIS DE
- 95 DEVON THOMAS DE
- 96 DERRICK KENNEDY DT
- 98 RANDY ZILKO DE
- 99 GRANT JOHNSON DT
