= 1998 Army Cadets football team =

American college football season

1998 Army Cadets football
- Conference: Conference USA
- Record: 3–8 (2–4 C-USA)
- Head coach: Bob Sutton (8th season)
- Offensive coordinator: Ed Warinner (1st season)
- Offensive scheme: Triple option
- Defensive coordinator: Denny Doornbos (8th season)
- Base defense: 4–3
- Captains: Neil Ravitz; Kenny Dale Rowland
- Home stadium: Michie Stadium

1998 Conference USA football standings
	Conf.			Overall
Team	W		L	W		L
No. 7 Tulane $	6	–	0	12	–	0
Southern Miss	5	–	1	7	–	5
Louisville	4	–	2	7	–	5
East Carolina	3	–	3	6	–	5
Army	2	–	4	3	–	8
Houston	2	–	4	3	–	8
Memphis	1	–	5	2	–	9
Cincinnati	1	–	5	2	–	9
$ – Conference champion; Rankings from AP Poll

The 1998 Army Cadets football team was an American football team that represented the United States Military Academy as a member of Conference USA (C-USA) in the 1998 NCAA Division I-A football season. In their eighth season under head coach Bob Sutton, the Cadets compiled a 3–8 record and were outscored by their opponents by a combined total of 325 to 257. In the annual Army–Navy Game, the Cadets defeated Navy, 34–30.

== Schedule ==
Date	Time	Opponent	Site	TV	Result	Attendance	Source
September 12		Miami (OH)*	Michie Stadium; West Point, NY		L 13–14		
September 19		Cincinnati	Michie Stadium; West Point, NY		W 37–20		
September 26		at Rutgers*	Rutgers Stadium; New Brunswick, NJ		L 15–27		
October 3		at East Carolina	Dowdy–Ficklen Stadium; Greenville, NC		L 25–30	40,607	
October 10		at Houston	Robertson Stadium; Houston, TX		W 38–28	18,480	
October 17		Southern Miss	Michie Stadium; West Point, NY		L 13–37	40,395	
October 24	2:30 p.m.	at No. 18 Notre Dame*	Notre Dame Stadium; Notre Dame, IN (rivalry)	NBC	L 17–20	80,012	
November 7		No. 25 Air Force*	Michie Stadium; West Point, NY (Commander-in-Chief's Trophy)		L 7–35		
November 14	12:00 p.m.	No. 14 Tulane	Michie Stadium; West Point, NY		L 35–49	39,083	
November 21	2:00 p.m.	at Louisville	Papa John's Cardinal Stadium; Louisville, KY		L 23–35	40,349	
December 5		vs. Navy*	Veterans Stadium; Philadelphia, PA (Army–Navy Game)		W 34–30		
*Non-conference game; Rankings from AP Poll released prior to the game; All times are in Eastern time

== Roster ==
1998 Army Cadets football team roster
Players
Coaches
Offense

Pos.	#	Name	Class
RB		Ty Amey
QB		Joe Gerena	So

Defense

Pos.	#	Name	Class
DB	17	Tony Coaxum	Jr

Special teams

Pos.	#	Name	Class

Head coach

- Bob Sutton

Coordinators/assistant coaches

Legend

- (C) Team captain
- (S) Suspended
- (I) Ineligible
- Injured
- Redshirt
