= 1998 New Mexico State Aggies football team =

American college football season

1998 New Mexico State Aggies football
- Conference: Big West Conference
- Record: 3–8 (1–4 Big West)
- Head coach: Tony Samuel (2nd season)
- Offensive coordinator: Barney Cotton (2nd season)
- Offensive scheme: Option
- Defensive coordinator: Jeff Jamrog (2nd season)
- Base defense: 4–3
- Home stadium: Aggie Memorial Stadium

1998 Big West Conference football standings
	Conf.			Overall
Team	W		L	W		L
Idaho $	4	–	1	9	–	3
Nevada	3	–	2	6	–	5
North Texas	3	–	2	3	–	8
Boise State	2	–	3	6	–	5
Utah State	2	–	3	3	–	8
New Mexico State	1	–	4	3	–	8
$ – Conference champion

The 1998 New Mexico State Aggies football team was an American football team that represented New Mexico State University in the Big West Conference during the 1998 NCAA Division I-A football season. In their second year under head coach Tony Samuel, the Aggies compiled a 3–8 record. The team played its home games at Aggie Memorial Stadium in Las Cruces, New Mexico.

== Schedule ==
Date	Opponent	Site	Result	Attendance	Source
September 5	at Texas*	Darrell K Royal–Texas Memorial Stadium; Austin, TX	L 36–66	75,914	
September 12	at Georgia Tech*	Bobby Dodd Stadium; Atlanta, GA	L 7–42	36,382	
September 19	New Mexico*	Aggie Memorial Stadium; Las Cruces, NM (rivalry)	W 28–27		
September 26	UTEP*	Aggie Memorial Stadium; Las Cruces, NM (rivalry)	W 33–24	32,993	
October 3	at Arkansas State*	Indian Stadium; Jonesboro, AR	L 31–34 ^{OT}		
October 10	at Nevada	Mackay Stadium; Reno, NV	W 48–45	23,142	
October 17	Colorado State*	Aggie Memorial Stadium; Las Cruces, NM	L 28–47		
October 31	Utah State	Aggie Memorial Stadium; Las Cruces, NM	L 26–29	13,312	
November 7	Boise State	Aggie Memorial Stadium; Las Cruces, NM	L 51–55	12,034	
November 14	at Idaho	Kibbie Dome; Moscow, ID	L 32–36	14,435	
November 21	at North Texas	Fouts Field; Denton, TX	L 11–19		
*Non-conference game
