= 1998 North Texas Mean Green football team =

American college football season

1998 North Texas Mean Green football
- Conference: Big West Conference
- Record: 3–8 (3–2 Big West)
- Head coach: Darrell Dickey (1st season)
- Offensive scheme: Pro spread
- Base defense: 3–4
- Home stadium: Fouts Field

1998 Big West Conference football standings
	Conf.			Overall
Team	W		L	W		L
Idaho $	4	–	1	9	–	3
Nevada	3	–	2	6	–	5
North Texas	3	–	2	3	–	8
Boise State	2	–	3	6	–	5
Utah State	2	–	3	3	–	8
New Mexico State	1	–	4	3	–	8
$ – Conference champion

The 1998 North Texas Mean Green football team represented the University of North Texas in the 1998 NCAA Division I-A football season. The Mean Green played their home games at the Fouts Field in Denton, Texas, and competed in the Big West Conference. They were led by first-year head coach Darrell Dickey, who took over for Matt Simon. Dickey had been hired away from SMU, serving as their offensive coordinator and quarterbacks coach the year prior. The team finished the regular season with a 3–8 overall record with a 3–2 mark in Big West play.

== Schedule ==
Date	Opponent	Site	Result	Attendance	Source
September 5	at Oklahoma*	Oklahoma Memorial Stadium; Norman, OK	L 9–37	72,831	
September 12	vs. Texas Tech*	Texas Stadium; Irving, TX	L 0–30	21,496	
September 19	at Arizona State*	Sun Devil Stadium; Tempe, AZ	L 15–34	61,158	
September 26	at No. 17 Texas A&M*	Kyle Field; College Station, TX	L 9–28	56,072	
October 10	Boise State	Fouts Field; Denton, TX	W 21–13	21,252	
October 17	Nevada^{†}	Fouts Field; Denton, TX	W 27–21		
October 24	Houston*	Fouts Field; Denton, TX	L 9–31	13,899	
October 31	Idaho	Fouts Field; Denton, TX	L 23–41	7,112	
November 7	at Kansas*	Kansas Memorial Stadium; Lawrence, KS	L 14–23	20,000	
November 14	at Utah State	Romney Stadium; Logan, UT	L 27–28	7,376	
November 21	New Mexico State	Fouts Field; Denton, TX	W 19–11		
*Non-conference game; ^{†}Homecoming; Rankings from AP Poll released prior to the game
