= 1998 Eastern Washington Eagles football team =

American college football season

1998 Eastern Washington Eagles football
- Conference: Big Sky Conference
- Record: 5–6 (4–4 Big Sky)
- Head coach: Mike Kramer (5th season)
- Home stadium: Woodward Field; Joe Albi Stadium

1998 Big Sky Conference football standings
	Conf.			Overall
Team	W		L	W		L
No. 15 Montana $^	6	–	2	8	–	4
Cal State Northridge	5	–	3	7	–	4
No. 25 Montana State	5	–	3	7	–	4
Weber State	4	–	4	6	–	5
Eastern Washington	4	–	4	5	–	6
Portland State	4	–	4	5	–	6
Northern Arizona	3	–	5	6	–	5
Sacramento State	3	–	5	5	–	6
Idaho State	2	–	6	3	–	8
$ – Conference champion; ^ – NCAA Division I-AA playoff participant; Rankings from The Sports Network poll

The 1998 Eastern Washington Eagles football team represented Eastern Washington University as a member of the Big Sky Conference during the 1998 NCAA Division I-AA football season. Led by fifth-year head coach Mike Kramer, the Eagles compiled an overall record of 6–5, with a mark of 4–4 in conference play, and finished tied for fourth in the Big Sky.

== Schedule ==
Date	Opponent	Rank	Site	Result	Attendance	Source
September 5	at Idaho*	No. 21	Kibbie Dome; Moscow, ID	L 14–31	10,495	
September 12	Portland State		Woodward Field; Cheney, WA	L 27–30 ^{OT}	5,032	
September 26	at Cal State Northridge		North Campus Stadium; Northridge, CA	L 35–38	3,920	
October 3	Northern Arizona		Woodward Field; Cheney, WA	W 21–17	3,625	
October 10	Western Washington*		Woodward Field; Cheney, WA	W 42–19	5,051	
October 17	at Idaho State		Holt Arena; Pocatello, ID	W 44–13	6,382	
October 24	Montana		Joe Albi Stadium; Spokane, WA (EWU–UM Governors Cup)	L 27–30	8,721	
October 31	at Sacramento State		Hornet Stadium; Sacramento, CA	W 31–25	4,237	
November 7	No. 14 Montana State		Woodward Field; Cheney, WA	W 31–24	4,028	
November 14	at Weber State		Stewart Stadium; Ogden, UT	L 23–27	5,339	
November 21	at Southern Utah*		Eccles Coliseum; Cedar City, UT	L 21–43	1,405	
*Non-conference game; Rankings from The Sports Network Poll released prior to the game
