= 1998 Montana State Bobcats football team =

American college football season

1998 Montana State Bobcats football
- Conference: Big Sky Conference

Ranking
- Sports Network: No. 25
- Record: 7–4 (5–3 Big Sky)
- Head coach: Cliff Hysell (5th season)
- Home stadium: Bobcat Stadium

1998 Big Sky Conference football standings
	Conf.			Overall
Team	W		L	W		L
No. 15 Montana $^	6	–	2	8	–	4
Cal State Northridge	5	–	3	7	–	4
No. 25 Montana State	5	–	3	7	–	4
Weber State	4	–	4	6	–	5
Eastern Washington	4	–	4	5	–	6
Portland State	4	–	4	5	–	6
Northern Arizona	3	–	5	6	–	5
Sacramento State	3	–	5	5	–	6
Idaho State	2	–	6	3	–	8
$ – Conference champion; ^ – NCAA Division I-AA playoff participant; Rankings from The Sports Network poll

The 1998 Montana State Bobcats football team was an American football team that represented Montana State University in the Big Sky Conference (Big Sky) during the 1998 NCAA Division I-AA football season. In their fifth season under head coach Cliff Hysell, the Bobcats compiled a 7–4 record (5–3 against Big Sky opponents), tied for second place in the Big Sky, and were ranked No. 25 in the final I-AA poll by The Sports Network (wire service).

The team played its home games in the new Bobcat Stadium in Bozeman, Montana. The new stadium was built on the site of the former Reno H. Sales Stadium. The west side was new and included a combined sky box and press box.

== Schedule ==
Date	Opponent	Rank	Site	Result	Attendance	Source
September 5	Fort Lewis*		Bobcat Stadium; Bozeman, MT	W 45–9	8,297	
September 12	at Wyoming*		War Memorial Stadium; Laramie, WY	L 9–17	15,445	
September 19	Western Washington*		Bobcat Stadium; Bozeman, MT	W 41–12	8,000	
September 26	Sacramento State^{†}		Bobcat Stadium; Bozeman, MT	W 37–30	10,227	
October 10	at No. 9 Weber State		Stewart Stadium; Ogden, UT	W 10–7	8,002	
October 17	Portland State	No. 21	Bobcat Stadium; Bozeman, MT	L 31–34	10,717	
October 24	at No. 24 Cal State Northridge		North Campus Stadium; Northridge, CA	W 32–26	6,124	
October 31	Northern Arizona	No. 21	Bobcat Stadium; Bozeman, MT	W 32–25	7,267	
November 7	at Eastern Washington	No. 14	Woodward Field; Cheney, WA	L 24–31	4,028	
November 14	Idaho State	No. 21	Bobcat Stadium; Bozeman, MT	W 66–35	7,017	
November 21	at No. 20 Montana	No. 19	Washington–Grizzly Stadium; Missoula, MT (rivalry)	L 21–28	19,238	
*Non-conference game; ^{†}Homecoming; Rankings from The Sports Network Poll released prior to the game
