= 1998 Montana Grizzlies football team =

American college football season

1998 Montana Grizzlies football

Big Sky champion

NCAA Division I-AA First Round, L 9–52 vs. Western Illinois
- Conference: Big Sky Conference

Ranking
- Sports Network: No. 14
- Record: 8–4 (6–2 Big Sky)
- Head coach: Mick Dennehy (3rd season)
- Offensive coordinator: Brent Pease (3rd season)
- Home stadium: Washington–Grizzly Stadium

1998 Big Sky Conference football standings
| | Conf. | | | Overall |
| Team | W | | L | W | | L |
|---|---|---|---|---|---|---|
| No. 15 Montana $^ | 6 | – | 2 | 8 | – | 4 |
| Cal State Northridge | 5 | – | 3 | 7 | – | 4 |
| No. 25 Montana State | 5 | – | 3 | 7 | – | 4 |
| Weber State | 4 | – | 4 | 6 | – | 5 |
| Eastern Washington | 4 | – | 4 | 5 | – | 6 |
| Portland State | 4 | – | 4 | 5 | – | 6 |
| Northern Arizona | 3 | – | 5 | 6 | – | 5 |
| Sacramento State | 3 | – | 5 | 5 | – | 6 |
| Idaho State | 2 | – | 6 | 3 | – | 8 |
$ – Conference champion; ^ – NCAA Division I-AA playoff participant; Rankings from The Sports Network poll

The 1998 Montana Grizzlies football team represented the University of Montana in the 1998 NCAA Division I-AA football season. The Grizzlies were led by third-year head coach Mick Dennehy and played their home games at Washington–Grizzly Stadium.

== Schedule ==
| Date | Time | Opponent | Rank | Site | TV | Result | Attendance | Source |
|---|---|---|---|---|---|---|---|---|
| September 5 | 6:05 pm | at No. 20 Stephen F. Austin* | No. 3 | Homer Bryce Stadium; Nacogdoches, TX | | W 49–42 | | |
| September 12 | 1:05 pm | Southern Utah* | No. 3 | Washington–Grizzly Stadium; Missoula, MT | | L 35–45 | 18,804 | |
| September 19 | 1:05 pm | Cal Poly* | No. 11 | Washington-Grizzly Stadium; Missoula, MT | | W 37–14 | 17,325 | |
| September 26 | 6:05 pm | at No. 21 Weber State | No. 11 | Stewart Stadium; Ogden, UT | KPAX | L 20–27 | 16,954 | |
| October 3 | 1:05 pm | Portland State^{†} | No. 21 | Washington-Grizzly Stadium; Missoula, MT | | W 20–17 | 18,731 | |
| October 10 | 4:00 pm | at No. 23 Cal State Northridge | No. 18 | North Campus Stadium; Northridge, CA | | L 7–21 | 5,237 | |
| October 17 | 1:05 pm | Northern Arizona | | Washington–Grizzly Stadium; Missoula, MT | | W 33–20 | 18,594 | |
| October 24 | 2:05 pm | at Eastern Washington | | Joe Albi Stadium; Spokane, WA (Governors Cup) | KPAX | W 30–27 | 8,721 | |
| October 31 | 1:05 pm | Idaho State | | Washington–Grizzly Stadium; Missoula, MT | KPAX | W 40–13 | 17,384 | |
| November 14 | 2:05 pm | at Sacramento State | No. 22 | Hornet Stadium; Sacramento, CA | | W 31–16 | | |
| November 21 | 12:35 pm | No. 19 Montana State | No. 20 | Washington–Grizzly Stadium; Missoula, MT (rivalry) | KPAX | W 28–21 | 19,238 | |
| November 28 | 11:30 am | at No. 4 Western Illinois* | No. 13 | Hanson Field; Macomb, IL (NCAA Division I-AA First Round) | | L 9–52 | 3,614 | |
*Non-conference game; ^{†}Homecoming; Rankings from The Sports Network Poll released prior to the game; All times are in Mountain time
