= 1998 Memphis Tigers football team =

American college football season

1998 Memphis Tigers football
- Conference: Conference USA
- Record: 2–9 (1–5 C-USA)
- Head coach: Rip Scherer (4th season)
- Co-offensive coordinators: Rusty Burns (2nd season); Dave Magazu (2nd season)
- Defensive coordinator: Jim Pletcher (4th season)
- Home stadium: Liberty Bowl Memorial Stadium

1998 Conference USA football standings
	Conf.			Overall
Team	W		L	W		L
No. 7 Tulane $	6	–	0	12	–	0
Southern Miss	5	–	1	7	–	5
Louisville	4	–	2	7	–	5
East Carolina	3	–	3	6	–	5
Army	2	–	4	3	–	8
Houston	2	–	4	3	–	8
Memphis	1	–	5	2	–	9
Cincinnati	1	–	5	2	–	9
$ – Conference champion; Rankings from AP Poll

The 1998 Memphis Tigers football team represented the University of Memphis in the 1998 NCAA Division I-A football season. Memphis competed as a member of the Conference USA. The team was led by head coach Rip Scherer, who was fired at the conclusion of the season. The Tigers played their home games at the Liberty Bowl Memorial Stadium.

== Schedule ==
Date	Time	Opponent	Site	TV	Result	Attendance	Source
September 5	6:00 pm	at Ole Miss*	Vaught–Hemingway Stadium; Oxford, MS (rivalry)	FSN	L 10–31	46,191	
September 12	11:30 am	Mississippi State*	Liberty Bowl Memorial Stadium; Memphis, TN	FSN	L 6–14	28,467	
September 19	2:30 pm	at Minnesota*	Hubert H. Humphrey Metrodome; Minneapolis, MN	FSN	L 14–41	35,919	
October 3	7:00 pm	at Houston	Robertson Stadium; Houston, TX		L 14–35	13,140	
October 10	2:30 pm	No. 20 Arkansas*	Liberty Bowl Memorial Stadium; Memphis, TN	ESPN2	L 9–23	42,766	
October 17	6:00 pm	Cincinnati	Liberty Bowl Memorial Stadium; Memphis, TN (rivalry)		W 41–23	17,252	
October 24	1:00 pm	at Louisville	Papa John's Cardinal Stadium; Louisville, KY (rivalry)		L 32–35	39,247	
October 31	1:00 pm	Arkansas State*^{†}	Liberty Bowl Memorial Stadium; Memphis, TN (Paint Bucket Bowl)		W 35–19	18,142	
November 7	1:00 pm	No. 15 Tulane	Liberty Bowl Memorial Stadium; Memphis, TN		L 31–41	18,192	
November 14	5:00 pm	at Southern Miss	M. M. Roberts Stadium; Hattiesburg, MS (Black and Blue Bowl)		L 3–45	19,132	
November 21	1:00 pm	East Carolina	Liberty Bowl Memorial Stadium; Memphis, TN		L 31–34	16,052	
*Non-conference game; ^{†}Homecoming; Rankings from AP Poll released prior to the game; All times are in Central time
