= Ron Ponciano =

American football coach (born c. 1961)

Biographical details
- Born: c. 1961 (age 64–65); Willows, California, U.S.

Playing career
- 1979–1982: Azusa Pacific
- Position: Linebacker

Coaching career (HC unless noted)
- 1984–1986: Azusa Pacific (DC)
- 1987–1988: USC (GA)
- 1989: Los Angeles Valley (DC)
- 1990: College of the Siskiyous (DC)
- 1991 (spring): Shasta (DC)
- 1991: Shasta (interim HC / DC)
- 1992 (spring): Mendocino
- 1992: Shasta (DC)
- 1993–1994: Missouri Western (DL)
- 1995–1996: Cal State Northridge (DC)
- 1997: San Jose State (DC)
- 1998: Cal State Northridge
- 1999: McPherson (DC)
- 2000: Los Angeles Valley (AHC)
- 2001–2004: Los Angeles Valley
- 2005–2008: Citrus (DC)
- 2009–2020: Citrus
- 2022: Antelope Valley (interim HC)

Head coaching record
- Overall: 7–4 (college); 67–106 (junior college)

Accomplishments and honors

Awards
- Big Sky Coach of the Year (1998)

Ronald Lloyd Ponciano (born c. 1961) is an American college football coach. He was the head football coach for Shasta College in 1991, Mendocino College in the spring of 1992, California State University, Northridge in 1998, Los Angeles Valley College from 2001 to 2004, Citrus College from 2009 to 2020, and Antelope Valley College in 2022.

Ponciano also coached for Azusa Pacific—where he played linebacker—USC, College of the Siskiyous, Missouri Western, San Jose State, and McPherson.

== Head coaching record ==
=== College ===
Year	Team	Overall	Conference	Standing	Bowl/playoffs
Cal State Northridge Matadors (Big Sky Conference) (1998)
1998	Cal State Northridge	7–4	5–3	T–2nd	
Cal State Northridge:		7–4	5–3		
Total:		7–4			

=== Junior college ===
Year	Team	Overall	Conference	Standing	Bowl/playoffs
Shasta Knights (Golden Valley Conference) (1991)
1991	Shasta	5–5	2–4	3rd	
Shasta:		5–5	2–4		
Los Angeles Valley Monarchs (Western State Conference) (2001–2004)
2001	Los Angeles Valley	3–7	3–4	T–4th (Mountain)	
2002	Los Angeles Valley	4–6	3–4	T–4th (Mountain)	
2003	Los Angeles Valley	1–9	0–7	9th (North)	
2004	Los Angeles Valley	3–7	2–5	7th (North)	
Los Angeles Valley:		11–29	8–20		
Citrus Owls (National Central Conference) (2009)
2009	Citrus	3–7	2–4	T–4th	
Citrus Owls (Central West Conference) (2010–2011)
2010	Citrus	2–8	1–4	T–5th	
2011	Citrus	3–7	3–2	T–2nd	
Citrus Owls (National Central Conference / League) (2012–2015)
2012	Citrus	7–4	3–3	4th	
2013	Citrus	8–3	4–2	3rd	
2014	Citrus	3–7	2–4	5th	
2015	Citrus	2–8	1–5	6th	
Citrus Owls (American Pacific League) (2016–2017)
2016	Citrus	4–6	1–4	5th	
2017	Citrus	3–7	2–3	4th	
Citrus Owls (American Mountain League) (2018–2020)
2018	Citrus	7–4	4–1	2nd	
2019	Citrus	4–6	1–4	T–4th	
2020–21	No team—COVID-19				
Citrus:		46–67	24–36		
Antelope Valley Marauders (American Pacific League) (2022)
2022	Antelope Valley	5–5	3–2	3rd	
Antelope Valley:		5–5	3–2		
Total:		67–106			
