= 1998 Sacramento State Hornets football team =

American college football season

1998 Sacramento State Hornets football
- Conference: Big Sky Conference
- Record: 5–6 (3–5 Big Sky)
- Head coach: John Volek (4th season)
- Home stadium: Hornet Stadium

1998 Big Sky Conference football standings
| | Conf. | | | Overall |
| Team | W | | L | W | | L |
|---|---|---|---|---|---|---|
| No. 15 Montana $^ | 6 | – | 2 | 8 | – | 4 |
| Cal State Northridge | 5 | – | 3 | 7 | – | 4 |
| No. 25 Montana State | 5 | – | 3 | 7 | – | 4 |
| Weber State | 4 | – | 4 | 6 | – | 5 |
| Eastern Washington | 4 | – | 4 | 5 | – | 6 |
| Portland State | 4 | – | 4 | 5 | – | 6 |
| Northern Arizona | 3 | – | 5 | 6 | – | 5 |
| Sacramento State | 3 | – | 5 | 5 | – | 6 |
| Idaho State | 2 | – | 6 | 3 | – | 8 |
$ – Conference champion; ^ – NCAA Division I-AA playoff participant; Rankings from The Sports Network poll

The 1998 Sacramento State Hornets football team represented California State University, Sacramento as a member of the Big Sky Conference during the 1998 NCAA Division I-AA football season. Led by fourth-year head coach John Volek, Sacramento State compiled an overall record of 5–6 with a mark of 3–5 in conference play, tying for seventh place in the Big Sky. The team was outscored by its opponents 300 to 289 for the season. The Hornets played home games at Hornet Stadium in Sacramento, California.

== Schedule ==
| Date | Opponent | Site | Result | Attendance | Source |
|---|---|---|---|---|---|
| September 5 | at Saint Mary's* | Saint Mary's Stadium; Moraga, CA | W 25–12 | 2,354 | |
| September 12 | Cal Poly* | Hornet Stadium; Sacramento, CA | W 22–14 | 5,011 | |
| September 19 | at No. 2 (D-II) UC Davis* | Toomey Field; Davis, CA (Causeway Classic) | L 17–35 | 10,467 | |
| September 26 | at Montana State | Bobcat Stadium; Bozeman, MT | L 30–37 | 10,227 | |
| October 3 | No. 12 Weber State | Hornet Stadium; Sacramento, CA | L 14–27 | 3,516 | |
| October 10 | at Portland State | Civic Stadium; Portland, OR | L 31–58 | 5,957 | |
| October 17 | No. 16 Cal State Northridge | Hornet Stadium; Sacramento, CA | W 35–21 | 5,947 | |
| October 24 | at Northern Arizona | Walkup Skydome; Flagstaff, AZ | W 38–21 | 3,991 | |
| October 31 | Eastern Washington | Hornet Stadium; Sacramento, CA | L 25–31 | 4,237 | |
| November 7 | at Idaho State | Holt Arena; Pocatello, ID | W 36–13 | 3,412 | |
| November 14 | No. 22 Montana | Hornet Stadium; Sacramento, CA | L 16–31 | 8,268 | |
*Non-conference game; Rankings from The Sports Network Poll released prior to the game

== Team players in the NFL ==
No Sacramento State players were selected in the 1999 NFL draft.

The following finished their college career in 1998, were not drafted, but played in the NFL.

| Player | Position | First NFL team |
| Kato Serwanga | Defensive back | 1999 New England Patriots |
| Wasswa Serwanga | Defensive back | 1999 San Francisco 49ers |
