= Rick Minter =

American football coach (born 1954)

Baltimore Ravens
- Title: Senior defensive analyst

Personal information
- Born: October 4, 1954 (age 72); Nash, Texas, U.S.

Career information
- High school: Texas (Texarkana, Texas)
- College: Henderson State

Career history
- Henderson State (1977) Graduate assistant; Arkansas (1978) Graduate assistant; Louisiana Tech (1979–1980) Defensive ends coach; North Carolina State (1980–1982) Defensive ends coach; New Mexico State (1984) Linebackers coach; Ball State (1985–1991) Defensive coordinator; Notre Dame (1992–1993) Defensive coordinator; Cincinnati (1994–2003) Head coach; South Carolina (2004) Defensive coordinator; Notre Dame (2005–2007) Defensive coordinator; Marshall (2008–2009) Defensive coordinator; Marshall (2009) Interim head coach; Indiana State (2010) Linebackers coach; Kentucky (2011–2012) Defensive coordinator; Philadelphia Eagles (2013–2015) Linebackers coach; Georgia State (2016) Defensive line coach; Florida Tech (2017–2018) Defensive coordinator; Birmingham Iron (2019) Defensive coordinator; Southern Miss (2020) Defensive analyst; Michigan (2022) Defensive analyst; Michigan (2023) Interim linebackers coach; Los Angeles Chargers (2024–2025) Senior defensive analyst; Baltimore Ravens (2026–present) Senior defensive analyst

Awards and highlights
- As assistant coach: CFP national champion (2023); As head coach: C-USA champion (2002)

Head coaching record
- Career: NCAA: 54–63–1 (.462)

Richard Minter (born October 4, 1954) is an American football coach who is the senior defensive analyst for the Baltimore Ravens of the National Football League (NFL). He previously served as the linebackers coach for the Michigan Wolverines and as a defensive coordinator for the Birmingham Iron in the Alliance of American Football (AAF). Minter has previously served as the head football coach at the University of Cincinnati from 1994 to 2003 and as the interim head coach for Marshall University in the 2009 Little Caesars Pizza Bowl, compiling a career college football record of 54–63–1.

== Early life and education ==
Minter was born on October 4, 1954, in Nash, Texas, and raised in Texarkana, Texas. He graduated from Texas High School in Texarkana. He then attended Henderson State University where he earned his undergraduate degree and a master's degree. He is also a member of the Phi Sigma Epsilon.

== Coaching career ==
Minter started his career as a graduate assistant coach at Henderson State University in 1977. In 1978, he was a graduate assistant coach at the University of Arkansas where the Razorbacks finished the season 9–2–1. In 1979, he became the defensive ends coach at Louisiana Tech. From 1980 to 1982, he was the linebackers coach at North Carolina State. In 1984, he was the linebackers coach at New Mexico State.

From 1985 to 1991, Minter was the assistant head coach and defensive coordinator at Ball State. From 1992 to 1993, he served as the defensive coordinator for the University of Notre Dame, where he led the Irish to a #2 national ranking. From 1994 to 2003, he was the head football coach at the University of Cincinnati, where he compiled a 53–63–1 record. Among Cincinnati's head coaches, Rick Minter has both the record for second most career wins and the record for most career losses. He was fired at the end of the 2003 season shortly after the school accepted an invite to Big East Conference. The Bearcats played in four bowl games during his tenure.

On February 7, 2026, it was announced that the Baltimore Ravens would be hiring Minter to serve as a senior defensive analyst on his son Jesse's first coaching staff.

== Personal life ==
Minter's son, Jesse, is the head coach of the Baltimore Ravens. Since the start of Jesse's coaching career, the two have coached eight seasons together on six different collegiate and professional teams.

== Head coaching record ==
Year	Team	Overall	Conference	Standing	Bowl/playoffs
Cincinnati Bearcats (NCAA Division I-A independent) (1994–1995)
1994	Cincinnati	2–8–1			
1995	Cincinnati	6–5			
Cincinnati Bearcats (Conference USA) (1996–2003)
1996	Cincinnati	6–5	2–3	T–3rd	
1997	Cincinnati	8–4	2–4	T–4th	W Humanitarian
1998	Cincinnati	2–9	1–5	T–7th	
1999	Cincinnati	3–8	0–6	9th	
2000	Cincinnati	7–5	5–2	T–2nd	L Motor City
2001	Cincinnati	7–5	5–2	T–2nd	L Motor City
2002	Cincinnati	7–7	6–2	T–1st	L New Orleans
2003	Cincinnati	5–7	2–6	9th	
Cincinnati:		53–63–1	23–30		
Marshall Thundering Herd (Conference USA) (2009)
2009	Marshall	1–0			W Little Caesars
Marshall:		1–0			
Total:		54–63–1			
National championship Conference title Conference division title or championship game berth
