= 1998 Southern Miss Golden Eagles football team =

American college football season

1998 Southern Miss Golden Eagles football

Humanitarian Bowl, L 35–42 vs. Idaho
- Conference: Conference USA
- Record: 7–5 (5–1 C-USA)
- Head coach: Jeff Bower (9th season)
- Offensive coordinator: Larry Kueck (2nd season)
- Offensive scheme: Pro-style
- Defensive coordinator: John Thompson (7th season)
- Base defense: Multiple
- Home stadium: M. M. Roberts Stadium

1998 Conference USA football standings
	Conf.			Overall
Team	W		L	W		L
No. 7 Tulane $	6	–	0	12	–	0
Southern Miss	5	–	1	7	–	5
Louisville	4	–	2	7	–	5
East Carolina	3	–	3	6	–	5
Army	2	–	4	3	–	8
Houston	2	–	4	3	–	8
Memphis	1	–	5	2	–	9
Cincinnati	1	–	5	2	–	9
$ – Conference champion; Rankings from AP Poll

The 1998 Southern Miss Golden Eagles football team represented the University of Southern Mississippi in the 1998 NCAA Division I-A football season. The Golden Eagles were led by ninth-year head coach Jeff Bower and played their home games at M. M. Roberts Stadium. Following a successful 1997 season, the Golden Eagles were ranked in the preseason for the first time in school history, 21st in both polls. However, they were unable to replicate the previous season's success, losing their opening two games to ranked opponents and started 1–3. They finished with an overall record of 7–5 (5–1 C-USA), finishing second in Conference USA. They were invited to the 1998 Humanitarian Bowl, where they lost to Idaho, 35–42.

== Schedule ==
Date	Opponent	Rank	Site	TV	Result	Attendance	Source
September 5	at No. 13 Penn State*	No. 21	Beaver Stadium; University Park, PA		L 6–34	96,617	
September 19	No. 17 Texas A&M*		M. M. Roberts Stadium; Hattiesburg, MS	FSNSW	L 6–24	33,233	
September 26	Southwestern Louisiana*		M. M. Roberts Stadium; Hattiesburg, MS		W 55–0	24,379	
October 3	at Tulane		Louisiana Superdome; New Orleans, LA (rivalry)		L 7–21	32,527	
October 10	Louisville		M. M. Roberts Stadium; Hattiesburg, MS		W 56–21	22,043	
October 17	at Army		Michie Stadium; West Point, NY		W 37–13	40,395	
October 24	East Carolina^{†}		M. M. Roberts Stadium; Hattiesburg, MS		W 41–7	24,020	
October 31	at Alabama*		Bryant–Denny Stadium; Tuscaloosa, AL		L 20–30	83,818	
November 7	at Houston		Robertson Stadium; Houston, TX		W 21–15	16,260	
November 14	Memphis		M. M. Roberts Stadium; Hattiesburg, MS (rivalry)		W 45–3	19,132	
November 21	at Nevada*		Mackay Stadium; Reno, NV		W 55–28	18,336	
December 30	vs. Idaho*		Bronco Stadium; Boise, ID (Humanitarian Bowl)	ESPN2	L 35–42	19,664	
*Non-conference game; ^{†}Homecoming; Rankings from AP Poll released prior to the game

== Rankings ==
- This season was the first time the Golden Eagles were ranked in the preseason.

Ranking movements Legend: ██ Increase in ranking ██ Decrease in ranking — = Not ranked
	Week															
Poll	Pre	1	2	3	4	5	6	7	8	9	10	11	12	13	14	Final
AP	21	—	—	—	—	—	—	—	—	—	—	—	—	—	—	—
Coaches Poll	21	—	—	—	—	—	—	—	—	—	—	—	—	—	—	—
BCS	Not released								—	—	—	—	—	—	—	Not released
