= 1998 Cal State Northridge Matadors football team =

American college football season

1998 Cal State Northridge Matadors football
- Conference: Big Sky Conference
- Record: 7–4 (5–3 Big Sky)
- Head coach: Ron Ponciano (1st season)
- Offensive coordinator: Rob Phenicie (2nd season)
- Home stadium: North Campus Stadium

1998 Big Sky Conference football standings
	Conf.			Overall
Team	W		L	W		L
No. 15 Montana $^	6	–	2	8	–	4
Cal State Northridge	5	–	3	7	–	4
No. 25 Montana State	5	–	3	7	–	4
Weber State	4	–	4	6	–	5
Eastern Washington	4	–	4	5	–	6
Portland State	4	–	4	5	–	6
Northern Arizona	3	–	5	6	–	5
Sacramento State	3	–	5	5	–	6
Idaho State	2	–	6	3	–	8
$ – Conference champion; ^ – NCAA Division I-AA playoff participant; Rankings from The Sports Network poll

The 1998 Cal State Northridge Matadors football team represented California State University, Northridge as a member of the Big Sky Conference during the 1998 NCAA Division I-AA football season. Led by Rob Phenicie in his first and only season as head coach, Cal State Northridge compiled an overall record of 7–4 with a mark of 5–3 in conference play, tying for second place in the Big Sky. The Matadors played home games at North Campus Stadium in Northridge, California.

== Schedule ==
Date	Opponent	Rank	Site	Result	Attendance	Source
September 5	at Boise State*		Bronco Stadium; Boise, ID	L 13–26	25,127	
September 19	at No. 13 Northern Arizona		Walkup Skydome; Flagstaff, AZ	W 41–10	7,144	
September 26	Eastern Washington		North Campus Stadium; Northridge, CA	W 38–35	3,920	
October 3	Southern Utah*		North Campus Stadium; Northridge, CA	W 44–17	3,317	
October 10	No. 18 Montana	No. 23	North Campus Stadium; Northridge, CA	W 21–7	5,237	
October 17	at Sacramento State	No. 16	Hornet Stadium; Sacramento, CA	L 21–35	5,947	
October 24	Montana State	No. 24	North Campus Stadium; Northridge, CA	L 26–32	6,124	
October 31	at Weber State		Wildcat Stadium; Ogden, UT	W 26–10	5,813	
November 7	Portland State		North Campus Stadium; Northridge, CA	W 32–28	3,813	
November 14	at Southwest Missouri State*	No. 25	Plaster Sports Complex; Springfield, MO	W 42–38	7,574	
November 21	at Idaho State	No. 25	Holt Arena; Pocatello, ID	L 29–32	4,151	
*Non-conference game; Rankings from The Sports Network Poll released prior to the game
