= 1998 Cincinnati Bearcats football team =

American college football season

1998 Cincinnati Bearcats football
- Conference: Conference USA
- Record: 2–9 (0–6 C-USA)
- Head coach: Rick Minter (5th season)
- Offensive coordinator: Greg Seamon (4th season)
- Offensive scheme: Pro-style
- Defensive coordinator: Kim Dameron (1st season)
- Base defense: 4–3
- Home stadium: Nippert Stadium

1998 Conference USA football standings
	Conf.			Overall
Team	W		L	W		L
No. 7 Tulane $	6	–	0	12	–	0
Southern Miss	5	–	1	7	–	5
Louisville	4	–	2	7	–	5
East Carolina	3	–	3	6	–	5
Army	2	–	4	3	–	8
Houston	2	–	4	3	–	8
Memphis	1	–	5	2	–	9
Cincinnati	1	–	5	2	–	9
$ – Conference champion; Rankings from AP Poll

The 1998 Cincinnati Bearcats football team represented the University of Cincinnati in the 1998 NCAA Division I-A football season. The team, coached by Rick Minter, played their home games in Nippert Stadium, as it has since 1924.

== Schedule ==
Date	Time	Opponent	Site	TV	Result	Attendance	Source
September 5	7:00 pm	Tulane	Nippert Stadium; Cincinnati, OH		L 34–52	20,721	
September 12	3:30 pm	Miami (FL)*	Nippert Stadium; Cincinnati, OH	FSN	L 12–38	20,681	
September 19		at Army	Michie Stadium; West Point, NY		L 20–37		
September 26	6:00 pm	Indiana*	Nippert Stadium; Cincinnati, OH		L 14–48	32,117	
October 3	2:00 pm	at Louisville	Papa John's Cardinal Stadium; Louisville, KY (The Keg of Nails)		L 19–62	35,479	
October 10	5:30 pm	at No. 24 Syracuse*	Carrier Dome; Syracuse, NY	ESPN2	L 21–63	47,251	
October 17	7:00 pm	at Memphis	Liberty Bowl Memorial Stadium; Memphis, TN (rivalry)		L 23–41	17,252	
October 24		Miami (OH)*	Nippert Stadium; Cincinnati, OH (Victory Bell)		L 0–41		
November 5	8:00 pm	East Carolina	Nippert Stadium; Cincinnati, OH	ESPN	L 21–24	19,098	
November 14		Houston	Nippert Stadium; Cincinnati, OH		W 44–43	16,886	
November 21		at Arkansas State*	Indian Stadium; Jonesboro, AR		W 51–7		
*Non-conference game; Rankings from AP Poll released prior to the game; All times are in Eastern time

== Roster ==
1998 Cincinnati Bearcats football team roster
Players
Coaches
Offense

Pos.	#	Name	Class
G	66	Ken Biggs	Jr
WR	2	Jason Collins-Baker	So
QB	7	Deontey Kenner	So
QB	4	Chad Plummer	Sr

Defense

Pos.	#	Name	Class
CB	8	Jeff Burrow	Jr
DT	92	Percy Evans	Sr
LB	59	Troy Evans	So
CB	40	Shawn Ferguson	Sr
CB	34	LaVar Glover	Fr
LB	22	DeJuan Gossett	So
SS	6	Eric Harper	Sr

Special teams

Pos.	#	Name	Class
K	13	Joe Judge	Jr

Head coach

- Rick Minter

Coordinators/assistant coaches

Legend

- (C) Team captain
- (S) Suspended
- (I) Ineligible
- Injured
- Redshirt

Roster
