= 1998 Portland State Vikings football team =

American college football season

1998 Portland State Vikings football
- Conference: Big Sky Conference
- Record: 5–6 (4–4 Big Sky)
- Head coach: Tim Walsh (6th season)
- Home stadium: Civic Stadium

1998 Big Sky Conference football standings
	Conf.			Overall
Team	W		L	W		L
No. 15 Montana $^	6	–	2	8	–	4
Cal State Northridge	5	–	3	7	–	4
No. 25 Montana State	5	–	3	7	–	4
Weber State	4	–	4	6	–	5
Eastern Washington	4	–	4	5	–	6
Portland State	4	–	4	5	–	6
Northern Arizona	3	–	5	6	–	5
Sacramento State	3	–	5	5	–	6
Idaho State	2	–	6	3	–	8
$ – Conference champion; ^ – NCAA Division I-AA playoff participant; Rankings from The Sports Network poll

The 1998 Portland State Vikings football team was an American football team that represented Portland State University during the 1998 NCAA Division I-AA football season as a member of the Big Sky Conference. In their sixth year under head coach Tim Walsh, the team compiled a 5–6 record, with a mark of 4–4 in conference play, and finished tied for fourth in the Big Sky.

== Schedule ==
Date	Opponent	Site	Result	Attendance	Source
September 12	at Eastern Washington	Woodward Field; Cheney, WA	W 30–27 ^{OT}	5,032	
September 19	at Boise State*	Bronco Stadium; Boise, ID	L 24–42	22,412	
September 26	Idaho State	Civic Stadium; Portland, OR	L 41–43	7,861	
October 3	at No. 21 Montana	Washington–Grizzly Stadium; Missoula, MT	L 17–20	18,731	
October 10	Sacramento State	Civic Stadium; Portland, OR	W 58–31	5,957	
October 17	at No. 21 Montana State	Bobcat Stadium; Bozeman, MT	W 34–31	10,717	
October 24	No. 17 Weber State	Civic Stadium; Portland, OR	W 34–27	7,214	
October 31	Cal Poly*	Civic Stadium; Portland, OR	W 41–34	5,337	
November 7	at Cal State Northridge	North Campus Stadium; Northridge, CA	L 28–32	3,813	
November 14	Northern Arizona	Civic Stadium; Portland, OR	L 13–23		
November 21	at Northeast Louisiana*	Malone Stadium; Monroe, LA	L 27–43	12,160	
*Non-conference game; Rankings from The Sports Network Poll released prior to the game
