= 1998 Liberty Bowl =

1998 AXA/Equitable Liberty Bowl
- 40th Liberty Bowl
BYU Cougars	Tulane Green Wave
(9–4)	(11–0)
WAC	C-USA
27	41
Head coach: LaVell Edwards	Head coach: Chris Scelfo (interim)
	AP / Coaches / BCS; 10 / 10 / 10
	1	2	3	4	Total
BYU	6	0	0	21	27
Tulane	10	10	14	7	41
- Date: December 31, 1998
- Season: 1998
- Stadium: Liberty Bowl Memorial Stadium
- Location: Memphis, Tennessee
- MVP: Shaun King, Tulane QB
- Referee: Doyle Jackson (SEC)
- Attendance: 52,197
- Payout: US$1,100,000

United States TV coverage
- Network: ESPN
- Announcers: Rich Waltz, Rod Gilmore, Holly Rowe

The 1998 Liberty Bowl was a college football bowl game played on December 31, 1998, at Liberty Bowl Memorial Stadium in Memphis, Tennessee. The 40th edition of the Liberty Bowl, the game matched the BYU Cougars of the Western Athletic Conference (WAC) and the Tulane Green Wave of Conference USA (C-USA). The game was sponsored by the Axa Equitable Life Insurance Company and was branded as the AXA/Equitable Liberty Bowl.

Tulane won the game, 41–27, to finish—along with the Tennessee Volunteers—as the only undefeated Division I-A teams for the 1998 NCAA Division I-A football season.

== Teams ==
=== BYU ===
After opening the season 2–3, BYU won seven consecutive games to earn a spot in the WAC Championship Game. In that contest, the Cougars lost to Air Force 20–13. Prior to the championship game, the Cougars accepted a bid to play in the 40th Liberty Bowl. The appearance in the game marked BYU's first New Year's Eve bowl, and their first all-time appearance in the Liberty Bowl. In mid-December, BYU head coach LaVell Edwards announced that starting running back Ronney Jenkins and defensive back Heshimu Robertson would be suspended for the Liberty Bowl for violating the Brigham Young University Honor Code.

=== Tulane ===
The 1998 Tulane squad entered the season with returning C-USA Offensive Player of the Year Shaun King at quarterback and picked to finish tied for second place with East Carolina in the preseason conference rankings. Following their week two victory over SMU, local media started to mention the Green Wave as a potential at-large opponent to play in the Sugar Bowl as part of the inaugural Bowl Championship Series (BCS). Although Tulane finished the regular season with an 11–0 record, since they finished outside the sixth position in the final BCS standings, the Green Wave did not qualify for a BCS bowl game. Instead they were invited to the Liberty Bowl as C-USA champions. The appearance in the game marked Tulane's first bowl since the 1987 Independence Bowl, and their third all-time appearance in the Liberty Bowl.

Following the conclusion of the regular season, on December 2 head coach Tommy Bowden resigned as head coach to accept the same position at Clemson. At that time offensive coordinator Rich Rodriguez was named interim head coach through at least the Liberty Bowl. Although Rodriguez was thought to be the top candidate for the coaching vacancy, on December 7 Tulane announced Georgia offensive coordinator Chris Scelfo as Tulane's new head coach. At the time of the announcement, officials also stated Scelfo would serve as head coach in the bowl game instead of Rodriguez, and that most of Bowden's staff would remain in place for the Liberty Bowl.

== Game summary ==
In a game ultimately dominated by Tulane, BYU scored the first points of the game. Early in the first, Kevin Feterik hit Ben Horton for an 11-yard touchdown reception, and after Owen Pochman missed the extra point the Cougars took an early 6–0 lead. The Green Wave responded on the following drive with a 31-yard Brad Palazzo field goal to cut the lead in half. With BYU driving on the ensuing possession, Michael Jordan intercepted a Feterik pass and returned it 79 yards for touchdown. The return was the longest in the history on the Liberty Bowl and gave Tulane a 10–6 lead. In the second quarter, Shaun King scored on a three-yard run and Palazzo hit a 23-yard field goal to give Tulane a 20–6 lead at the half. King continued the scoring in the third with a pair of touchdown passes to cap two 82-yard drives. The first came on a 60-yard pass to Kerwin Cook and the second on a 13-yard pass to Jamaican Dartez. With Tulane leading 34–6 entering the fourth quarter, BYU scored the first of three late touchdowns on a three-yard Aaron Cupp touchdown run. Tulane responded on the next drive with its final points of the game on a five-yard Toney Converse run to extend their lead to 41–13. The Cougars closed the contest with an 18-yard Cupp reception for a score and a three-yard Reno Mahe touchdown run to bring the final score to 41–27. For his 276 yards passing, 109 yards rushing and three total touchdowns, Tulane quarterback Shaun King was named the game's Most Valuable Player.

Scoring summary

Quarter	Time	Drive			Team	Scoring information	Score	
Quarter	Time	Plays	Yards	TOP	Team	Scoring information	BYU	TU
1	8:49	7	65	2:50	BYU	Ben Horton 11-yard touchdown reception from Kevin Feterik, Owen Pochman kick no good	6	0
1	4:23	11	56	4:26	TU	31-yard field goal by Brad Palazzo	6	3
1	1:35				TU	Interception returned 79 yards for touchdown by Michael Jordan, Brad Palazzo kick good	6	10
2	10:18	7	58	2:29	TU	Shaun King 3-yard touchdown run, Brad Palazzo kick good	6	17
2	00:41	10	45	4:09	TU	23-yard field goal by Brad Palazzo	6	20
3	13:48	4	82	2:12	TU	Kerwin Cook 60-yard touchdown reception from Shaun King, Brad Palazzo kick good	6	27
3	7:27	11	82	2:12	TU	Jamaican Dartez 13-yard touchdown reception from Shaun King, Brad Palazzo kick good	6	34
4	11:38	9	67	3:27	BYU	Aaron Cupp 3-yard touchdown run, Owen Pochman kick good	13	34
4	9:24	6	76	2:14	TU	Toney Converse 5-yard touchdown run, Brad Palazzo kick good	13	41
4	8:06	4	20	1:18	BYU	Aaron Cupp 18-yard touchdown reception from Kevin Feterik, Owen Pochman kick good	20	41
4	1:30				BYU	Reno Mahe 3-yard touchdown run, Owen Pochman kick good	27	41
"TOP" = time of possession. For other American football terms, see Glossary of American football.							27	41
