= 1998 Houston Cougars football team =

American college football season

1998 Houston Cougars football
- Conference: Conference USA
- Record: 3–8 (2–4 C-USA)
- Head coach: Kim Helton (6th season)
- Offensive coordinator: Dan Lounsbury (2nd season)
- Offensive scheme: Multiple
- Defensive coordinator: Gary Bartel (2nd season)
- Base defense: 4–3
- Captains: Jason deGroot; Jerrian James; Micah Malone
- Home stadium: Robertson Stadium

1998 Conference USA football standings
	Conf.			Overall
Team	W		L	W		L
No. 7 Tulane $	6	–	0	12	–	0
Southern Miss	5	–	1	7	–	5
Louisville	4	–	2	7	–	5
East Carolina	3	–	3	6	–	5
Army	2	–	4	3	–	8
Houston	2	–	4	3	–	8
Memphis	1	–	5	2	–	9
Cincinnati	1	–	5	2	–	9
$ – Conference champion; Rankings from AP Poll

The 1998 Houston Cougars football team, also known as the Houston Cougars, Houston, or UH represented the University of Houston in the 1998 NCAA Division I-A football season. It was the 53rd year of season play for Houston. The team was coached by Kim Helton. The team played all its home games at Robertson Stadium, a 32,000-person capacity stadium on campus in Houston, for the first time since 1950.

== Schedule ==
Date	Time	Opponent	Site	TV	Result	Attendance	Source
September 5	2:30 pm	at California*	California Memorial Stadium; Berkeley, CA		L 10–14	33,000	
September 12	7:30 pm	Minnesota*	Robertson Stadium; Houston, TX	MSC	L 7–14	17,540	
September 19	2:30 pm	No. 4 UCLA*	Robertson Stadium; Houston, TX	FX	L 24–42	19,540	
September 26	7:00 pm	at No. 4 Tennessee*	Neyland Stadium; Knoxville, TN	PPV	L 7–42	106,417	
October 3	7:00 pm	Memphis	Robertson Stadium; Houston, TX		W 35–14	13,140	
October 10		Army	Robertson Stadium; Houston, TX		L 28–38	18,480	
October 24		at North Texas*	Fouts Field; Denton, TX		W 31–9	13,899	
October 31	2:30 pm	at East Carolina	Dowdy–Ficklen Stadium; Greenville, NC	FSN	W 34–31	26,821	
November 7		Southern Miss^{†}	Robertson Stadium; Houston, TX		L 15–21	16,260	
November 14		at Cincinnati	Nippert Stadium; Cincinnati, OH		L 43–44	16,886	
November 21	2:30 pm	at No. 12 Tulane	Louisiana Superdome; New Orleans, LA	FSN	L 20–48	26,978	
*Non-conference game; ^{†}Homecoming; Rankings from AP Poll released prior to the game; All times are in Central time
