= 1998 Boise State Broncos football team =

American college football season

1998 Boise State Broncos football
- Conference: Big West Conference
- Record: 6–5 (2–3 Big West)
- Head coach: Dirk Koetter (1st season)
- Offensive coordinator: Dan Hawkins (1st season)
- Defensive coordinator: Brent Guy (1st season)
- Home stadium: Bronco Stadium

1998 Big West Conference football standings
	Conf.			Overall
Team	W		L	W		L
Idaho $	4	–	1	9	–	3
Nevada	3	–	2	6	–	5
North Texas	3	–	2	3	–	8
Boise State	2	–	3	6	–	5
Utah State	2	–	3	3	–	8
New Mexico State	1	–	4	3	–	8
$ – Conference champion

The 1998 Boise State Broncos football team represented Boise State University as a member of the Big West Conference during the 1998 NCAA Division I-A football season. Led by first-year head coach Dirk Koetter, the Broncos compiled an overall record of 6–5 with a mark of 2–3 in conference play, tying for fourth place in the Big West. The team played home games on campus, at Bronco Stadium in Boise, Idaho.

== Schedule ==
Date	Time	Opponent	Site	Result	Attendance	Source
September 5	7:05 pm	Cal State Northridge*	Bronco Stadium; Boise, ID	W 26–13	25,127	
September 12	7:05 pm	Washington State*	Bronco Stadium; Boise, ID	L 21–33	26,189	
September 19	7:05 pm	Portland State*	Bronco Stadium; Boise, ID	W 42–24	22,412	
September 26	7:00 pm	at Utah*	Rice–Eccles Stadium; Salt Lake City, UT	W 31–28	36,037	
October 3	3:00 pm	at Louisiana Tech*	Joe Aillet Stadium; Ruston, LA	L 28–63	17,623	
October 10	7:05 pm	North Texas	Bronco Stadium; Boise, ID	L 13–21	21,252	
October 17	7:05 pm	Weber State*^{†}	Bronco Stadium; Boise, ID	W 24–13	20,766	
October 24	7:05 pm	Utah State	Bronco Stadium; Boise, ID	W 30–16	19,561	
October 31	7:05 pm	at Nevada	Mackay Stadium; Reno, NV (rivalry)	L 24–52	24,279	
November 7	6:00 pm	at New Mexico State	Aggie Memorial Stadium; Las Cruces, NM	W 55–51	12,034	
November 21	1:00 pm	Idaho	Bronco Stadium; Boise, ID (rivalry)	L 35–36 ^{OT}	30,208	
*Non-conference game; ^{†}Homecoming; All times are in Mountain time
