= Chris Bush (gridiron football) =

American gridiron football player (born 1981)

No. 87
- Position: Wide receiver

Personal information
- Born: July 22, 1981 (age 45); Metairie, Louisiana, U.S.
- Listed height: 6 ft 1 in (1.85 m)
- Listed weight: 193 lb (88 kg)

Career information
- High school: East St. John (Reserve, Louisiana)
- College: Tulane (2000–2004)
- NFL draft: 2005: undrafted

Career history
- Tennessee Titans (2005)*; BC Lions (2006)
- * Offseason or practice squad member only

Chris Bush (born July 22, 1981) is an American former football wide receiver. He played college football for the Tulane Green Wave, and professionally for the BC Lions of the Canadian Football League (CFL).

== Biography ==
Bush was born in Metairie, Louisiana and attended East St. John High School in Reserve, Louisiana. He was named All-River Parish while catching 94 passes for 1,260 yards and 35 touchdowns. He was also All-State in both long jump and triple jump.

Bush played college football at Tulane University as a wide receiver. In his final year there, he started 20 games for Tulane catching 37 passes for an average of 18 yards per reception. After college, Bush was signed by the Tennessee Titans of the National Football League as an undrafted free agent, but was released in August 2005. He subsequently signed with the BC Lions of the Canadian Football League (CFL) in May 2006. He dressed in four games for the Lions during the 2006 CFL season before being released in August 2006.
