= Chris Scelfo =

American football player and coach (born 1963)

Current position
- Title: Special assistant to the head coach
- Team: Tulsa

Biographical details
- Born: September 30, 1963 (age 63); Abbeville, Louisiana, U.S.

Playing career
- 1981–1984: Northeast Louisiana
- Position: Offensive lineman

Coaching career (HC unless noted)
- 1986–1987: Northeast Louisiana (GA)
- 1988–1989: Oklahoma (GA)
- 1990–1992: Marshall (OL)
- 1993–1995: Marshall (OC/OL)
- 1996–1998: Georgia (assistant HC / OL)
- 1998–2006: Tulane
- 2008–2014: Atlanta Falcons (TE)
- 2017: Houston (OL)
- 2018: Charlotte (OL)
- 2019: Arizona Hotshots (OL)
- 2020: DC Defenders (OL)
- 2025–present: Tulsa (Spec. Assistant Head Coach)

Head coaching record
- Overall: 37–57
- Bowls: 2–0

Christopher Joseph Scelfo (born September 30, 1963) is an American football coach who serves as a special assistant to the head coach at Tulsa. He was most recently the offensive line coach for the DC Defenders of the XFL. He was the offensive line coach and run-game coordinator for the Arizona Hotshots of the Alliance of American Football, having previously served in a similar position with the Houston Cougars and Charlotte 49ers. He previously served as the tight ends coach for the Atlanta Falcons of the National Football League (NFL). He served as head coach at Tulane from 1998 to 2006, including in the aftermath of Hurricane Katrina, and amassed a 37–57 record. He previously held assistant coaching positions at Marshall and Georgia.

== Early life ==
Scelfo was born in Abbeville, Louisiana on September 30, 1963, and later lived in New Iberia, Louisiana, where he attended New Iberia Senior High. He went on to college at Northeast Louisiana University. He played football in high school and college, and was a three-year letterwinner at both institutions. In college, he also served as the team captain. Scelfo graduated with a bachelor's degree from Northeast Louisiana in 1986 and received a master's degree from there in 1988.

== Coaching career ==
Scelfo became a graduate assistant at his alma mater from 1986 to 1987, then in the same position at the University of Oklahoma from 1988 to 1989. He then served as the offensive line coach at Marshall University from 1990 to 1995, and also held the position of offensive coordinator in his last three seasons there. Scelfo then spent three seasons at the University of Georgia as assistant head and offensive line coach.

Tulane University in New Orleans hired Scelfo to replace Tommy Bowden as its 36th coach mid-season on December 7, 1998. The only game he coached that year was the Liberty Bowl, where he led the Green Wave to victory over Brigham Young. With the win, Tulane finished the season with a perfect 12–0 record and the Conference USA championship. In 2002, Scelfo led Tulane to the 2002 Hawaii Bowl, where they defeated June Jones' high-octane Hawaii Warriors. The Green Wave surprised observers by recovering an onside kick on the first play of the game, and went on to win, 36–28.

After Hurricane Katrina devastated New Orleans in August 2005, the Tulane football team was forced to play all 11 of its games on the road, each in a different city, which may have contributed to the Green Wave's 2–9 record. Ole Miss head coach Ed Orgeron contacted a Tulane assistant about players transferring in the wake of the hurricane. Scelfo accused Ole Miss of tampering and said:

"In the worst natural disaster in the history of the United States, you've got to stoop pretty low to do that. You're lower than dirt ... I'm not going to tolerate that. There's people in our business that don't belong in our business."

The Southeastern Conference investigated the matter and exonerated Ole Miss of any wrongdoing.

After failing to compile a winning season since 2002, Tulane fired Scelfo on November 29, 2006. His final record at Tulane was 37–57. In January 2008, the Atlanta Falcons of the NFL hired Scelfo as its tight ends coach.

He later became the offensive line coach for the Charlotte 49ers and Houston Cougars. In 2019, he returned to the professional level as the offensive line coach and run-game coordinator for the Arizona Hotshots of the Alliance of American Football, followed by the DC Defenders of the XFL in 2020.

== Personal life ==
Scelfo is married to wife Nancy née Caldwell, with whom he has a son and a daughter. His brother, Frank Scelfo, is currently the head coach at Southeastern Louisiana University. His nephew, Anthony Scelfo, played as a quarterback at Tulane. Scelfo's son, Joe Scelfo, played center at the University of South Alabama from 2012 to 2015. Following Joe's junior year, he graduate transferred to NC State University for his final year. He signed as an undrafted free agent to the Houston Texans following the 2017 NFL draft.

== Head coaching record ==
Year	Team	Overall	Conference	Standing	Bowl/playoffs	Coaches^{#}	AP^{°}
Tulane Green Wave (Conference USA) (1998–2006)
1998	Tulane	1–0*	0–0	1st	W Liberty	7	7
1999	Tulane	3–8	1–5	T–6th			
2000	Tulane	6–5	3–4	T–5th			
2001	Tulane	3–9	1–6	9th			
2002	Tulane	8–5	4–4	5th	W Hawaii		
2003	Tulane	5–7	3–5	8th			
2004	Tulane	5–6	3–5	6th			
2005	Tulane	2–9	1–5	6th (West)			
2006	Tulane	4–8	2–5	6th (West)			
Tulane:		37–57	18–39				
Total:		37–57					
National championship Conference title Conference division title or championship game berth
^{#}Rankings from final Coaches Poll.; ^{°}Rankings from final AP Poll.
