= 2002 Hawaii Bowl =

2002 ConAgra Foods Hawaii Bowl
- 2002 Hawaii Bowl logo
Hawaii Warriors	Tulane Green Wave
(10–3)	(7–5)
WAC	C-USA
28	36
Head coach: June Jones	Head coach: Chris Scelfo
	1	2	3	4	Total
Hawaii	7	7	0	14	28
Tulane	0	6	20	10	36
- Date: December 25, 2002
- Season: 2002
- Stadium: Aloha Stadium
- Location: Honolulu, Hawaii
- MVP: CB Lynaris Elpheage (Tulane); WR Justin Colbert (Hawai'i)
- Favorite: Hawaii by 14.5
- Referee: Jim Fogltance (Pac-10)
- Attendance: 35,513
- Payout: US$750,000 per team

United States TV coverage
- Network: ESPN
- Announcers: Steve Levy (play-by-play); Rod Gilmore (analyst); Alex Flanagan (sideline)

The 2002 ConAgra Foods Hawaii Bowl was the inaugural Hawaii Bowl game and matched the hometown Hawaii Warriors with the Tulane Green Wave. Hawaii came into the game 10–3 and Tulane came into the game 7–5. The game was sponsored by ConAgra Foods, a packaged foods company.

Hawaii opened the scoring with a 1-yard Thero Mitchell touchdown, to lead the game 7–0. In the second quarter, Josh Galeai scored on a 2-yard touchdown run giving the Warriors a 14–0 lead. Seth Marler kicked field goals from 22 and 37 yards before the end of the first half to cut the lead to 14–6. In the third quarter, Lynaris Elpheage scored on a 60-yard punt return to cut the lead to 14–12. Tulane went for two but failed, and the score remained 14-12 Hawaii.

Later, Tulane quarterback J. P. Losman scored on a 1-yard quarterback sneak. He ran in the two-point conversion, giving Tulane a 20–14 lead. Mewelde Moore later scored on a 25-yard touchdown run for Tulane. Tulane went for two again, but were denied, leaving the score 26–14 Tulane. Shawn Withy-Allen, subbing for an injured Timmy Chang, threw a 57-yard touchdown pass to wide receiver Justin Colbert in the third quarter to cut the lead to 26–21.

Losman scored on a 3-yard rushing touchdown. He then threw a pass to Damarcus Davis for the two-point conversion and a 34–21 lead. Wide receiver Colbert caught a 31-yard touchdown pass from Withy-Allen to cut the lead to 34–28. On Hawaii's next drive, Withy-Allen was sacked in the end zone for a safety, making the final margin 36–28.
