= 1998 East Carolina Pirates football team =

American college football season

1998 East Carolina Pirates football
- Conference: Conference USA
- Record: 6–5 (3–3 C-USA)
- Head coach: Steve Logan (7th season)
- Offensive coordinator: Doug Martin (3rd season)
- Offensive scheme: Spread
- Defensive coordinator: Paul Jette (5th season)
- Base defense: 4–3
- Home stadium: Dowdy–Ficklen Stadium

1998 Conference USA football standings
	Conf.			Overall
Team	W		L	W		L
No. 7 Tulane $	6	–	0	12	–	0
Southern Miss	5	–	1	7	–	5
Louisville	4	–	2	7	–	5
East Carolina	3	–	3	6	–	5
Army	2	–	4	3	–	8
Houston	2	–	4	3	–	8
Memphis	1	–	5	2	–	9
Cincinnati	1	–	5	2	–	9
$ – Conference champion; Rankings from AP Poll

The 1998 East Carolina Pirates football team was an American football team that represented East Carolina University as a member of Conference USA during the 1998 NCAA Division I-A football season. In their seventh season under head coach Steve Logan, the team compiled a 6–5 record. The Pirates offense scored 274 points while the defense allowed 297 points.

== Schedule ==
Date	Time	Opponent	Site	TV	Result	Attendance	Source
September 5	4:00 pm	at Virginia Tech*	Lane Stadium; Blacksburg, VA	HTS	L 3–38	48,134	
September 12	3:00 pm	Chattanooga*	Dowdy–Ficklen Stadium; Greenville, NC		W 31–0	34,028	
September 19	12:00 pm	at Ohio*	Peden Stadium; Athens, OH	WITN	W 21–14	19,186	
October 3	3:30 pm	Army	Dowdy–Ficklen Stadium; Greenville, NC	FSN	W 30–25	40,607	
October 10	3:30 pm	UAB*^{†}	Dowdy–Ficklen Stadium; Greenville, NC		W 26–7	31,002	
October 17	3:00 pm	Alabama*	Legion Field; Birmingham, AL	PPV	L 22–23	80,079	
October 24	2:30 pm	at Southern Miss	M. M. Roberts Stadium; Hattiesburg, MS	FSN	L 7–41	24,020	
October 31	3:30 pm	Houston	Dowdy–Ficklen Stadium; Greenville, NC	FSN	L 31–34	26,821	
November 5	8:00 pm	at Cincinnati	Nippert Stadium; Cincinnati, OH	ESPN	W 24–21	19,098	
November 14	2:00 pm	Louisville	Dowdy–Ficklen Stadium; Greenville, NC		L 45–63	26,258	
November 21	2:00 pm	at Memphis	Liberty Bowl Memorial Stadium; Memphis, TN		W 34–31	16,052	
*Non-conference game; ^{†}Homecoming; All times are in Eastern time
