= Jeff Mills (American football coach) =

American football player and coach

Current position
- Title: Senior quality control for defense
- Team: Iowa State

Biographical details
- Education: Western Washington (1988)

Playing career
- 1984–1987: Western Washington
- Positions: Quarterback, outside linebacker

Coaching career (HC unless noted)
- 1988: Western Washington (OL)
- 1989: Drake (TE)
- 1990–1991: Washington (GA)
- 1992–1994: Montana State (DB)
- 1995–1997: Idaho (DB)
- 1998–1999: Idaho (DC)
- 2000–2003: Nevada (DC)
- 2004–2005: Idaho (AHC/S)
- 2006: Idaho (DC)
- 2007–2008: Youngstown State (DC)
- 2009–2011: Washington (DB)
- 2012–2013: New Mexico (DC)
- 2014: Indiana State (DL)
- 2015–2016: New Mexico Highlands
- 2018–2020: Houston Baptist (DC/S)
- 2021–present: Iowa State (senior QC)

Head coaching record
- Overall: 2–20

Jeff Mills is an American football coach. He is the senior quality control for defense at Iowa State University, a position he has held since 2021. Mills served as the head football coach at New Mexico Highlands University in Las Vegas, New Mexico from 2015 to 2016, compiling a record of 2–20. He was as the defensive coordinator and safeties coach at Houston Baptist University—now known as Houston Christian University—from 2018 to 2020.

Mills is the brother of former Charleston Southern Buccaneers football coach Jay Mills.

== Head coaching record ==
Year	Team	Overall	Conference	Standing	Bowl/playoffs
New Mexico Highlands Cowboys (Rocky Mountain Athletic Conference) (2015–2016)
2015	New Mexico Highlands	2–9	2–7	9th	
2016	New Mexico Highlands	0–11	0–10	11th	
New Mexico Highlands:		2–20	2–17		
Total:		2–20			
