= 1998 Tulane Green Wave football team =

American college football season

1998 Tulane Green Wave football
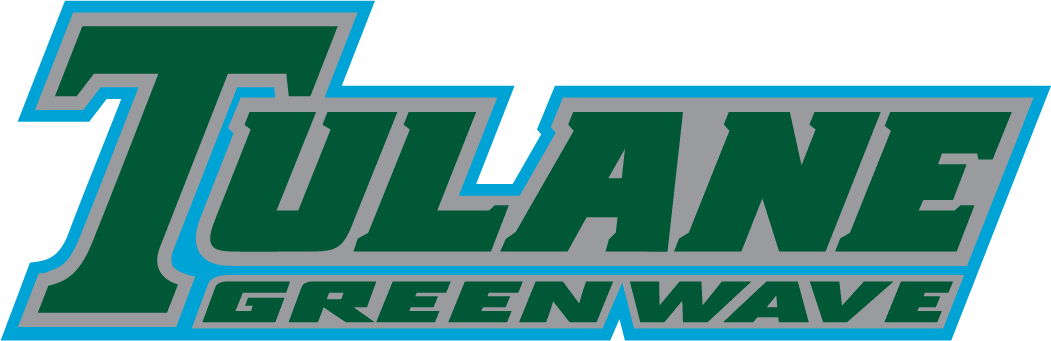

C-USA champion Liberty Bowl champion

Liberty Bowl, W 41–27 vs. BYU
- Conference: Conference USA

Ranking
- Coaches: No. 7
- AP: No. 7
- Record: 12–0 (6–0 C-USA)
- Head coach: Tommy Bowden (2nd season; regular season); Chris Scelfo (interim; bowl game)
- Offensive coordinator: Rich Rodriguez (2nd season)
- Offensive scheme: Spread option
- Defensive coordinator: Rick Smith (2nd season)
- Base defense: 4–3
- Home stadium: Louisiana Superdome

1998 Conference USA football standings
	Conf.			Overall
Team	W		L	W		L
No. 7 Tulane $	6	–	0	12	–	0
Southern Miss	5	–	1	7	–	5
Louisville	4	–	2	7	–	5
East Carolina	3	–	3	6	–	5
Army	2	–	4	3	–	8
Houston	2	–	4	3	–	8
Memphis	1	–	5	2	–	9
Cincinnati	1	–	5	2	–	9
$ – Conference champion; Rankings from AP Poll

The 1998 Tulane Green Wave football team represented Tulane University in the 1998 NCAA Division I-A football season. The Green Wave finished with a record of 12 wins and no losses, one of only two NCAA Division I-A teams to complete the season undefeated, the other being the BCS champion Tennessee Volunteers. It was the third undefeated and untied season in school history.

Despite finishing undefeated, the Green Wave were not considered for a BCS game, let alone a berth in the 1999 Fiesta Bowl—that year's national title game—because it was felt their strength of schedule was too weak to justify a berth in a higher-tier bowl. They did not play a single ranked team all season, and the only Automatic Qualifying conference member on their schedule was a Rutgers team that finished tied for sixth in the Big East. Moreover, they were the only team in Conference USA with fewer than five overall losses.

Prior to defeating Brigham Young in the Liberty Bowl, Tulane won the CUSA championship. The Green Wave finished the season ranked seventh in the nation in both the AP Poll and Coaches' Poll—in both cases, its highest rankings in school history since the 1939 Tulane football season when they were ranked No. 5 in the AP Poll.

The Green Wave won all of their games by six points or more. The combined 538 points set a single-season school record.

== Schedule ==
Date	Time	Opponent	Rank	Site	TV	Result	Attendance	Source
September 5	6:00 pm	at Cincinnati		Nippert Stadium; Cincinnati, OH		W 52–34	20,721	
September 12	7:00 pm	at SMU*		Cotton Bowl; Dallas, TX		W 31–21	12,316	
September 26	2:30 pm	Navy*		Louisiana Superdome; New Orleans, LA	FSN	W 42–24	19,371	
October 3	2:30 pm	Southern Miss		Louisiana Superdome; New Orleans, LA (rivalry)	FSN	W 21–7	32,527	
October 17	2:30 pm	Louisville^{†}	No. 24	Louisiana Superdome; New Orleans, LA	FSN	W 28–22	26,217	
October 24	11:00 am	at Rutgers*	No. 22	Rutgers Stadium; Piscataway, NJ		W 52–24	20,714	
October 31	2:30 pm	Southwestern Louisiana*	No. 19	Louisiana Superdome; New Orleans, LA		W 72–20	25,177	
November 7	1:00 pm	at Memphis	No. 15	Liberty Bowl Memorial Stadium; Memphis, TN		W 41–31	18,192	
November 14	12:00 pm	at Army	No. 14	Michie Stadium; West Point, NY	FSN	W 49–35	39,083	
November 21	2:30 pm	Houston	No. 12	Louisiana Superdome; New Orleans, LA	FSN	W 48–20	26,978	
November 26	7:00 pm	Louisiana Tech*	No. 11	Louisiana Superdome; New Orleans, LA		W 63–30	37,391	
December 31	12:30 pm	vs. BYU*	No. 10	Liberty Bowl Memorial Stadium; Memphis, TN (Liberty Bowl)	ESPN	W 41–27	52,197	
*Non-conference game; ^{†}Homecoming; Rankings from AP Poll released prior to the game; All times are in Central time

== Rankings ==
Ranking movements Legend: ██ Increase in ranking ██ Decrease in ranking — = Not ranked RV = Received votes т = Tied with team above or below
	Week															
Poll	Pre	1	2	3	4	5	6	7	8	9	10	11	12	13	14	Final
AP	—	—	RV	RV	25	25	24	22	19	16T	14	12	11	9	10	7
Coaches Poll	—	—	RV	RV	25	25	24	23	18	16	14	13	11	9	10	7
BCS	Not released								19	16	16	16	11	10	10	Not released

== Roster ==
1998 Tulane Green Wave football team roster
Players
Coaches
Offense

Pos.	#	Name	Class
QB	14	Jeff Curtis	Sr
WR	20	JaJuan Dawson	Jr
WR	8	P. J. Franklin	Sr
QB	10	Shaun King	Sr
QB	7	Patrick Ramsey	Fr
OT	74	Bernard Robertson	So

Defense

Pos.	#	Name	Class
SS	4	Tellius Carr	Sr
CB	15	Tim Carter	So
DE	58	Cory Green	So
CB	6	Michael Jordan	Sr
DT	65	Dennis O'Sullivan	Sr
CB	5	Alphonso Roundtree	Sr

Special teams

Pos.	#	Name	Class

Head coach

- Tommy Bowden

Coordinators/assistant coaches

Legend

- (C) Team captain
- (S) Suspended
- (I) Ineligible
- Injured
- Redshirt

Roster

== Game summaries ==
=== At Cincinnati ===
Tulane at Cincinnati

Team	1	2	3	4	Total
• Green Wave	17	14	14	7	52
Bearcats	0	6	8	20	34

- Location: Nippert Stadium, Cincinnati, OH
- Game start: 6:00 PM
- Game attendance: 20,721

=== At SMU ===
Tulane at SMU

Team	1	2	3	4	Total
• Green Wave	14	10	7	0	31
Mustangs	0	0	6	15	21

- Location: Cotton Bowl, Dallas, TX
- Game start: 7:00 PM
- Game attendance: 12,316

=== Navy ===
Navy at Tulane

Team	1	2	3	4	Total
Midshipmen	10	3	3	8	24
• Green Wave	7	14	14	7	42

- Location: Louisiana Superdome, New Orleans, LA
- Game start: 2:30 PM
- Game attendance: 19,371

=== Southern Miss ===
Southern Miss at No. 25 Tulane

Team	1	2	3	4	Total
Golden Eagles	0	0	7	0	7
• No. 25 Green Wave	7	7	7	0	21

- Location: Louisiana Superdome, New Orleans, LA
- Game start: 2:30 PM
- Game attendance: 32,527

=== Louisville ===
Louisville at No. 24 Tulane (Homecoming Game)

Team	1	2	3	4	Total
Cardinals	7	9	3	3	22
• No. 24 Green Wave	0	21	7	0	28

- Location: Louisiana Superdome, New Orleans, LA
- Game start: 2:30 PM
- Game attendance: 26,217
- TV announcers (FSN): Paul Kennedy and Trevor Matich

=== At Rutgers ===
No. 22 Tulane at Rutgers

Team	1	2	3	4	Total
• No. 22 Green Wave	10	28	7	7	52
Scarlet Knights	10	7	0	7	24

- Location: Rutgers Stadium, Piscataway, New Jersey
- Game start: 11:00 AM
- Game attendance: 20,714

=== Southwestern Louisiana ===
SW Louisiana at No. 19 Tulane

Team	1	2	3	4	Total
Ragin' Cajuns	0	7	0	13	20
• No. 19 Green Wave	16	28	7	21	72

- Location: Louisiana Superdome, New Orleans, LA
- Game start: 2:30 PM
- Game attendance: 25,177

=== At Memphis ===
No. 15 Tulane at Memphis

Team	1	2	3	4	Total
• No. 15 Green Wave	21	6	14	0	41
Tigers	7	0	3	21	31

- Location: Liberty Bowl, Memphis, Tennessee
- Game start: 1:00 PM
- Game attendance: 18,192

=== At Army ===
No. 14 Tulane at Army

Team	1	2	3	4	Total
• No. 14 Green Wave	14	7	14	14	49
Cadets	7	14	7	7	35

- Location: Michie Stadium, West Point, New York
- Game start: 12:00 PM
- Game attendance: 39,083

=== Houston ===
Houston at No. 12 Tulane

Team	1	2	3	4	Total
Cougars	7	6	0	7	20
• No. 12 Green Wave	3	14	17	14	48

- Location: Louisiana Superdome, New Orleans, LA
- Game start: 2:30 PM
- Game attendance: 26,978
- Television network: FSN

=== Louisiana Tech ===
Louisiana Tech at No. 11 Tulane

Team	1	2	3	4	Total
Bulldogs	10	6	14	0	30
• No. 11 Green Wave	14	21	21	7	63

- Location: Louisiana Superdome, New Orleans, LA
- Game start: 2:30 PM
- Game attendance: 37,391

=== Vs. BYU ===
BYU vs No. 10 Tulane

Team	1	2	3	4	Total
BYU	6	0	0	21	27
• No. 10 Tulane	10	10	14	7	41

- Location: Liberty Bowl, Memphis, Tennessee
- Game start: 12:30 PM
- Game attendance: 52,197
- Television network: ESPN

== Team players in the NFL ==
Player	Position	Round	Pick	NFL Team
Shaun King	Quarterback	2	50	Tampa Bay Buccaneers
Dennis O'Sullivan	Long Snapper	-	-	New York Jets / Houston Texans
