= 1998 Notre Dame Fighting Irish football team =

American college football season

1998 Notre Dame Fighting Irish football

Gator Bowl, L 28–35 vs. Georgia Tech
- Conference: Independent

Ranking
- Coaches: No. 22
- AP: No. 22
- Record: 9–3
- Head coach: Bob Davie (2nd season)
- Offensive coordinator: Jim Colletto (2nd season)
- Offensive scheme: Option
- Defensive coordinator: Greg Mattison (2nd season)
- Base defense: 4–3
- MVP: Autry Denson
- Captains: Bobbie Howard; Kory Minor; Mike Rosenthal
- Home stadium: Notre Dame Stadium

1998 NCAA Division I-A independents football records
	Conf.			Overall
Team	W		L	W		L
UCF		–		9	–	2
No. 22 Notre Dame		–		9	–	3
Louisiana Tech		–		6	–	6
Northeast Louisiana		–		5	–	6
UAB		–		4	–	7
Arkansas State		–		4	–	8
Navy		–		3	–	8
Southwestern Louisiana		–		2	–	9
Rankings from AP Poll

The 1998 Notre Dame Fighting Irish football team was an American football team that represented the University of Notre Dame as an independent during the 1998 NCAA Division I-A football season. In their second year under head coach Bob Davie, the Irish compiled a 9–3 record, outscored opponents by a total of 300 to 213, and were ranked No. 22 in the final AP poll and UPI polls. They opened the season with a victory over No. 5 Michigan but lost the following week to unranked Michigan State. They then won eight straight games over unranked opponents before losing to USC. They ended the season with a loss to Georgia Tech in the Gator Bowl.

The team's statistical leaders included quarterback Jarious Jackson (1,740 passing yards), tailback Autry Denson (1,274 rushing yards, 90 points scored), wide receiver Malcolm Johnson (43 receptions for 692 yards), and linebacker Bobbie Howard (118 tackles).

The team played its home games at Notre Dame Stadium in Notre Dame, Indiana.

== Schedule ==
Date	Time	Opponent	Rank	Site	TV	Result	Attendance	Source
September 5	2:30 p.m.	No. 5 Michigan	No. 22	Notre Dame Stadium; Notre Dame, IN (rivalry)	NBC	W 36–20	80,012	
September 12	8:00 p.m.	at Michigan State	No. 10	Spartan Stadium; East Lansing, MI (rivalry)	ABC	L 23–45	74,267	
September 26	2:30 p.m.	Purdue	No. 23	Notre Dame Stadium; Notre Dame, IN (rivalry)	NBC	W 31–30	80,012	
October 3	2:30 p.m.	Stanford	No. 23	Notre Dame Stadium; Notre Dame, IN (rivalry)	NBC	W 35–17	80,012	
October 10	3:30 p.m.	at Arizona State	No. 22	Sun Devil Stadium; Tempe, AZ	ABC	W 28–9	73,501	
October 24	2:30 p.m.	Army	No. 18	Notre Dame Stadium; Notre Dame, IN (rivalry)	NBC	W 20–17	80,012	
October 31	2:30 p.m.	Baylor	No. 16	Notre Dame Stadium; Notre Dame, IN	NBC	W 27–3	80,012	
November 7	12:00 p.m.	at Boston College	No. 13	Alumni Stadium; Chestnut Hill, MA (Holy War)	CBS	W 31–26	44,500	
November 14	3:30 p.m.	vs. Navy	No. 12	Jack Kent Cooke Stadium; Landover, MD (rivalry)	CBS	W 30–0	78,844	
November 21	1:30 p.m.	LSU	No. 10	Notre Dame Stadium; Notre Dame, IN	NBC	W 39–36	80,012	
November 28	8:00 p.m.	at USC	No. 9	Los Angeles Memorial Coliseum; Los Angeles, CA (rivalry)	ABC	L 0–10	90,069	
January 1, 1999	12:00 p.m.	vs. No. 12 Georgia Tech	No. 17	Alltel Stadium; Jacksonville, FL (Gator Bowl, rivalry)	NBC	L 28–35	70,791	
Rankings from AP Poll released prior to the game; All times are in Eastern time

== Rankings ==
Ranking movements Legend: ██ Increase in ranking ██ Decrease in ranking — = Not ranked RV = Received votes т = Tied with team above or below
	Week															
Poll	Pre	1	2	3	4	5	6	7	8	9	10	11	12	13	14	Final
AP	22	10	23	23T	23T	22	18	18	16	13	12	10	9	16	17	22
Coaches Poll	24	11	25	RV	23	22	20	20	16	13	13	10	10	16	18	22
BCS	Not released								16	13	12	10	9	—	—	Not released

== Season summary ==
With wins in their final five regular season games of 1997, the Irish started Davie's second season with confidence. Despite losing record-setting quarterback Ron Powlus, the Irish returned 14 starters, including tailback Autry Denson and three senior linebackers that were placed on the preliminary list for the Dick Butkus Award. Powlus was replaced by Jarious Jackson who had played sparingly in 1997 but had amassed almost 200 passing yards in the time. In Jackson's first start, against Michigan, he threw two touchdowns to lead the Irish, ranked 22nd, over the 5th ranked Wolverines. Denson added 162 yards and two touchdowns to give the Irish a 36–20 win. The Irish moved to tenth in the rankings, however didn't stay long, as Michigan State, who led by 39 points at halftime, beat the Irish for the second year in a row. Dropping back to 23rd in the nation, the Irish returned home to face Purdue. The Boilermakers handed the Irish their first loss in 1997 which dropped the Irish from the rankings, and the Irish looked for retribution in this game. With the Irish down two with less than two minutes remaining, Tony Driver, who was switched to cornerback in the offseason, intercepted a Drew Brees pass to set up the go-ahead field goal for the Irish. With the Boilermakers once again moving the ball, Driver had his second interception with less than a minute remaining to preserve the win for the Irish.

The Irish won all four of their October games, including a win over Stanford, a dominating win at Arizona State, a last minute win over Army, and a win over Baylor led by Denson's career high of 189 yards, to move back into the top-15 in the rankings. In the next game, the Boston College Eagles were poised for the upset of the Irish. Down 30–26, the Eagles had the ball on the Irish four-yard line with less than a minute remaining. The Irish defense, however, held the Eagles for four downs to preserve the win. The next week, led by Denson, who became the all-time leader in rushing yards at Notre Dame, the Irish shut-out Navy to increase their NCAA record winning streak over the Midshipmen to 35 games. Once again ranked tenth, the Irish faced LSU in their final home game. Avenging their loss in the 1997 Independence Bowl, the Irish beat the Tigers on a late touchdown run. With a potential BCS berth on the line, and without Jackson, who was injured in the final play against LSU, the Irish traveled to face rivals USC in their final regular season game. Playing two backups at quarterback, including true freshman Arnaz Battle, the Irish were dominated by the tough Trojan defense that caused five turnovers. Though the Trojans, led by freshman quarterback Carson Palmer, couldn't produce much offense themselves, they only needed two scores to defeat the Irish 10–0. Missing out on a BCS bowl game, the Irish, who signed a deal early in the year that gave them a tie-in with the Big East Conference bowl games, accepted a bid to play Georgia Tech in the Gator Bowl. Wearing their alternate green jerseys for the first time since the 1995 Fiesta Bowl, the Irish got behind early to the Yellow Jackets with two long touchdowns. Though closing the gap to a touchdown in the fourth quarter, the Irish couldn't move the ball on their last two drives and lost their fourth straight bowl game. They finished the season with a 9–3 record and dropped to 22nd in the national rankings.

After the season, seven players were taken in the 1999 National Football League (NFL) draft. Among them were Denson, who left with multiple Notre Dame rushing records, Malcolm Johnson, who left with a Notre Dame record of six consecutive games with a touchdown catch, and most of the offensive line starters. Also, offensive coordinator, Jim Colletto, was lured away to the NFL by Baltimore.

== Game summaries ==
=== Michigan ===
No. 5 Michigan Wolverines (0–0) at No. 22 Notre Dame Fighting Irish (0–0)

Quarter	1	2	3	4	Total
Michigan	3	10	0	7	20
Notre Dame	3	3	17	13	36

at Notre Dame Stadium, South Bend, Indiana

- Date: September 5
- Game time: 3:30 p.m. EDT
- Game weather: Sunny, 83 °F (28 °C)
- Game attendance: 80,012
- TV announcers (NBC): Dick Enberg and Pat Haden
- Box Score, Box Score

Team	Category	Player	Statistics
Michigan	Passing	Tom Brady	23/36, 267 Yds
Michigan	Rushing	Clarence Williams	13 Rush, 114 Yds
Michigan	Receiving	Marcus Knight	5 Rec, 126 Yds
Notre Dame	Passing	Jarious Jackson	4/10, 96 Yds, 2 TD, INT
Notre Dame	Rushing	Autry Denson	24 Rush, 162 Yds, 2 TD
Notre Dame	Receiving	Raki Nelson	2 Rec, 68 Yds, TD

Scoring summary

Quarter	Time	Drive			Team	Scoring information	Score	
Quarter	Time	Plays	Yards	TOP	Team	Scoring information	UM	ND
1	9:37		57		Michigan	36-yard field goal by Kraig Baker	3	0
1	7:30	5	57		Notre Dame	32-yard field goal by Jim Sanson	3	3
2	11:36	7	54	2:28	Michigan	21-yard field goal by Jay Feely	6	3
2	3:08	11	50	4:29	Notre Dame	27-yard field goal by Jim Sanson	6	6
2	0:23	12	72	2:45	Michigan	Tom Brady 1-yard touchdown run, Jay Feely kick good	13	6
3	11:34	10	62	3:26	Notre Dame	32-yard field goal by Jim Sanson	13	9
3	7:40	7	34	3:43	Notre Dame	Dan O'Leary 4-yard touchdown reception from Jarious Jackson, Jim Sanson kick good	13	16
3	5:02	1	35		Notre Dame	Raki Nelson 35-yard touchdown reception from Jarious Jackson, Jim Sanson kick good	13	23
4	13:23	9	52	4:05	Notre Dame	Autry Denson 3-yard touchdown run, Jim Sanson kick good	13	30
4	4:09				Notre Dame	Autry Denson 1-yard touchdown run, Jim Sanson kick no good	13	36
4	2:09		80		Michigan	Jerame Tuman 8-yard touchdown reception from Drew Henson, Jay Feely kick good	20	36
"TOP" = time of possession. For other American football terms, see Glossary of American football.							20	36

=== Stanford ===
Stanford Cardinal (1–3) at No. 23 Notre Dame Fighting Irish (2–1)

Quarter	1	2	3	4	Total
Stanford	3	0	0	14	17
Notre Dame	21	7	7	0	35

at Notre Dame Stadium, South Bend, Indiana

- Date: October 3
- Game time: 2:30 p.m. EDT
- Game weather: Cloudy, 53 °F (12 °C)
- Game attendance: 80,012
- TV: NBC
- Box Score

Team	Category	Player	Statistics
Stanford	Passing	Todd Husak	25/41, 226 Yds, TD
Stanford	Rushing	Coy Wire	19 Rush, 79 Yds
Stanford	Receiving	DeRonnie Pitts	8 Rec, 112 Yds
Notre Dame	Passing	Jarious Jackson	11/15, 163 Yds, INT
Notre Dame	Rushing	Jarious Jackson	18 Rush, 100 Yds, 3 TD
Notre Dame	Receiving	Malcolm Johnson	7 Rec, 113 Yds

== Roster ==
1998 Notre Dame Fighting Irish football team roster
Players
Coaches
Offense

Pos.	#	Name	Class
QB	3	Arnaz Battle	Fr
SE	6	Malcolm Johnson	Sr
QB	7	Jarious Jackson	Sr
QB	8	Eric Chappell	Jr
WR	9	Raki Nelson	Jr
SE	11	Jay Johnson	Jr
RB	12	Tony Fisher	Fr
WR	14	David Givens	Fr
QB	16	Zak Kustok	So
TE	16	John Shingler	Sr
FB	17	Jeremy Juarez	So
SE	18	Joey Getherall	So
WR	21	Javin Hunter	Fr
RB	22	Jay Vickers	Jr
RB	23	Autry Denson	Sr
RB	31	Darcey Levy	So
RB	32	Terrance Howard	Fr
FB	33	Jamie Spencer	Sr
FB	35	Jascint Vukelich	So
FB	36	Tom Lopienski	Fr
FB	40	Jason Murray	So
FB	45	Joey Goodspeed	Jr
TE	46	Benjamin Robinson	Sr
FB	47	Mike McNair	Fr
SE	48	Johnathan Hebert	Jr
G	50	David Payne	Sr
OT	54	Luke Petitgout	Sr
G	55	Jim Jones	Jr
G	58	Brendan O'Connor	Jr
OT	62	Casey Robin	So
C	64	John Merandi	Jr
C	66	JW Jordan	So
OT	67	John Wagner	Sr
OT	68	Matt Brennan	Jr
G	69	Mike Gandy	Jr
G	70	Tim Ridder	Sr
G	71	Jerry Wisne	Sr
OL	72	Ryan Scarola	Fr
OL	73	Jeff Roehl	Fr
C	74	Rob Mowl	Jr
OT	76	John Teasdale	So
OL	78	Jordan Black	Fr
OT	79	Mike Rosenthal	Sr
WR	81	Lewis Dawson	Jr
TE	84	Gerald Morgan	Fr
WR	85	Mark Rule	Sr
TE	86	Dan O'Leary	Jr
TE	87	Jabari Holloway	So
WR	88	Bobby Brown	Sr
TE	89	John Day-Owens	Fr

Defense

Pos.	#	Name	Class
FS	1	Deke Cooper	Jr
SS	2	Benny Guilbeaux	Sr
OLB	4	Kory Minor	Sr
FS	5	A'Jani Sanders	Sr
CB	10	Deveron Harper	Jr
MLB	13	Jimmy Friday	Sr
DB	15	Clifford Jefferson	Fr
LB	20	Carlos Pierre-Antoine	Fr
CB	24	Ty Goode	Sr
FS	25	Tony Driver	So
SS	26	Lee Lafayette	Jr
MLB	27	Bobbie Howard	Sr
DB	28	Donald Dykes	Fr
FS	28	Mike Grady	Jr
CB	29	Justin Smith	So
DB	30	Rocky Boiman	Fr
CB	31	Eric Himan	Sr
SS	32	Justin Meko	Sr
CB	33	Phil Sicuso	Sr
MLB	34	Ronnie Nicks	Jr
CB	36	Tim Lynch	Sr
CB	37	Ron Israel	So
SS	37	Kevin Rice	Sr
CB	38	Brock Williams	So
OLB	39	Anthony Denman	So
SS	39	Chris Leck	Jr
MLB	40	Brendan Farrell	Jr
OLB	41	Joe Ferrer	Jr
NG	42	Antwoine Wellington	Jr
MLB	43	Hugh Holmes	So
OLB	44	Grant Irons	So
OLB	46	Kevin Dansby	So
MLB	49	Joe Thomas	Sr
LB	51	Tyreo Harrison	Fr
DE	53	Lamont Bryant	Sr
MLB	63	Mike Tribe	Jr
DE	77	Brad Williams	Jr
NG	85	Antwon Jones	Sr
NG	90	Lance Legree	Jr
DE	91	Noah VanHook-Drucker	Jr
DE	93	B.J. Scott	Jr
NG	94	Andy Wisne	So
LB	95	Ryan Roberts	Fr
DL	96	Sean Mahan	Fr
DT	97	Kurt Vollers	So
DT	98	Eric Glass	Jr
DL	98	Anthony Weaver	Fr
DE	99	Jason Ching	Jr

Special teams

Pos.	#	Name	Class
P	17	Hunter Smith	Sr
K	19	Jim Sanson	Jr
K	21	Kevin McDonnell	Sr
K	35	David Miller	Fr
K	92	Adam Tibble	Fr

Head coach

- Bob Davie

Coordinators/assistant coaches

- Kirk Doll – Assistant Head Coach, Drop Outside and Inside Linebackers
- Jim Colletto – Offensive Coordinator, Tight Ends
- Greg Mattison – Defensive Coordinator, Defensive Ends, Nose Guards
- Urban Meyer – Receivers, Special Teams
- Desmond Robinson – Running Backs
- Mike Sanford – Quarterbacks
- Dave Borbely – Offensive Line
- Tom McMahon – Defensive Backfield
- Charlie Strong – Defensive Ends, Rush Outside Linebackers
- Bob Chmiel – Coordinator of Football Operations
- Jay Sawvel – Graduate Assistant
- Chris Wiesehan – Graduate Assistant

Legend

- (C) Team captain
- (S) Suspended
- (I) Ineligible
- Injured
- Redshirt

Roster

== Statistics ==
Passing

1. Jarious Jackson - 104 of 188 (55.3%) for 1,740 yards, 13 touchdowns, 6 interceptions
2. Arnaz Battle - 8 of 20 (40.0%) for 134 yards, 0 touchdowns and 2 interceptions

Rushing

1. Autry Denson - 1,176 yards on 251 attempts, 4.7-yard average, 15 touchdowns
2. Jarious Jackson - 441 yards on 113 attempts, 3.9-yard average, 3 touchdowns
3. Jamie Spencer - 256 yards on 54 attempts, 4.7-yard average, 2 touchdowns
4. Joey Goodspeed, 202 yards on 29 attempts, 7.0-yard average, 0 touchdowns

Receiving

1. Malcolm Johnson - 43 receptions for 692 yards, 16.1-yard average, 6 touchdowns
2. Bobby Brown - 13 receptions for 286 yards, 22.0-yard average, 1 touchdown
3. Jabari Holloway - 15 receptions for 262 yards, 17.5-yard average, 2 touchdowns
4. Raki Nelson - 11 receptions for 217 yards, 19.7-yard average, 2 touchdowns
5. Joey Getherall - 13 receptions for 197 yards, 15.2-yard average, 1 touchdown

Scoring

1. Autry Denson - 90 points scored, 15 touchdowns
2. Jim Sanson - 64 points scored, 31 or 36 PAT, 11 of 15 field goals
3. Malcolm Johnson - 36 points, 6 touchdowns

Tackles

1. Bobbie Howard (LB) - 118
2. Jimmy Friday (LB) - 79
3. Deke Cooper (DB) - 78
4. Tony Driver (CB) - 60
5. Kory Minor (LB) - 60
6. A'Jani Sanders (S) - 58
