= 1998 UCF Golden Knights football team =

American college football season

1998 UCF Golden Knights football
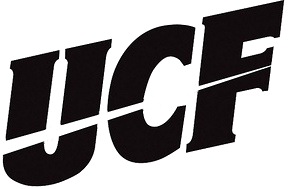
- Conference: Independent
- Record: 9–2
- Head coach: Mike Kruczek (1st season)
- Offensive coordinator: Paul Lounsberry (1st season)
- Defensive coordinator: Gene Chizik (1st season)
- Home stadium: Florida Citrus Bowl

1998 NCAA Division I-A independents football records
	Conf.			Overall
Team	W		L	W		L
UCF		–		9	–	2
No. 22 Notre Dame		–		9	–	3
Louisiana Tech		–		6	–	6
Northeast Louisiana		–		5	–	6
UAB		–		4	–	7
Arkansas State		–		4	–	8
Navy		–		3	–	8
Southwestern Louisiana		–		2	–	9
Rankings from AP Poll

The 1998 UCF Golden Knights football season was the twentieth season overall for the team, and third season as an NCAA Division I-A Independent. After the resignation of Gene McDowell, Mike Kruczek became the new head coach of the Golden Knights. Kruczek led UCF to a 9–2 record in 1998, the program's best season at the time. Quarterback Daunte Culpepper finished sixth in the Heisman Trophy voting and set a then-NCAA record for completion percentage (73.4%). UCF received a tentative verbal agreement to play in the Oahu Bowl. However, the arrangement fell through in the final week of the season.

UCF started out with a bang, routing Louisiana Tech and Eastern Illinois. Daunte Culpepper accounted for seven touchdowns against Eastern Illinois, earning him the USA Today Player of the Week honors. At 2–0, the Golden Knights faced Purdue on September 19. It was UCF's first nationally televised game on ESPN. The Golden Knights faltered, however, and lost 35-7.

On November 7 at Auburn, the team experienced one of the most heartbreaking losses in school history. UCF entered with a record of 7-1, working towards a possible at-large bowl bid. Leading 6–3 late in the game, Culpepper fumbled away a bad shotgun snap. Auburn recovered, and threw a 58-yard game-winning touchdown pass with one minute left.

Following the season, Daunte Culpepper was drafted with the 11th pick in the first round by the Minnesota Vikings. It marked the highest draft pick of a UCF player, until Blake Bortles was drafted with the third pick in 2014.

== Schedule ==
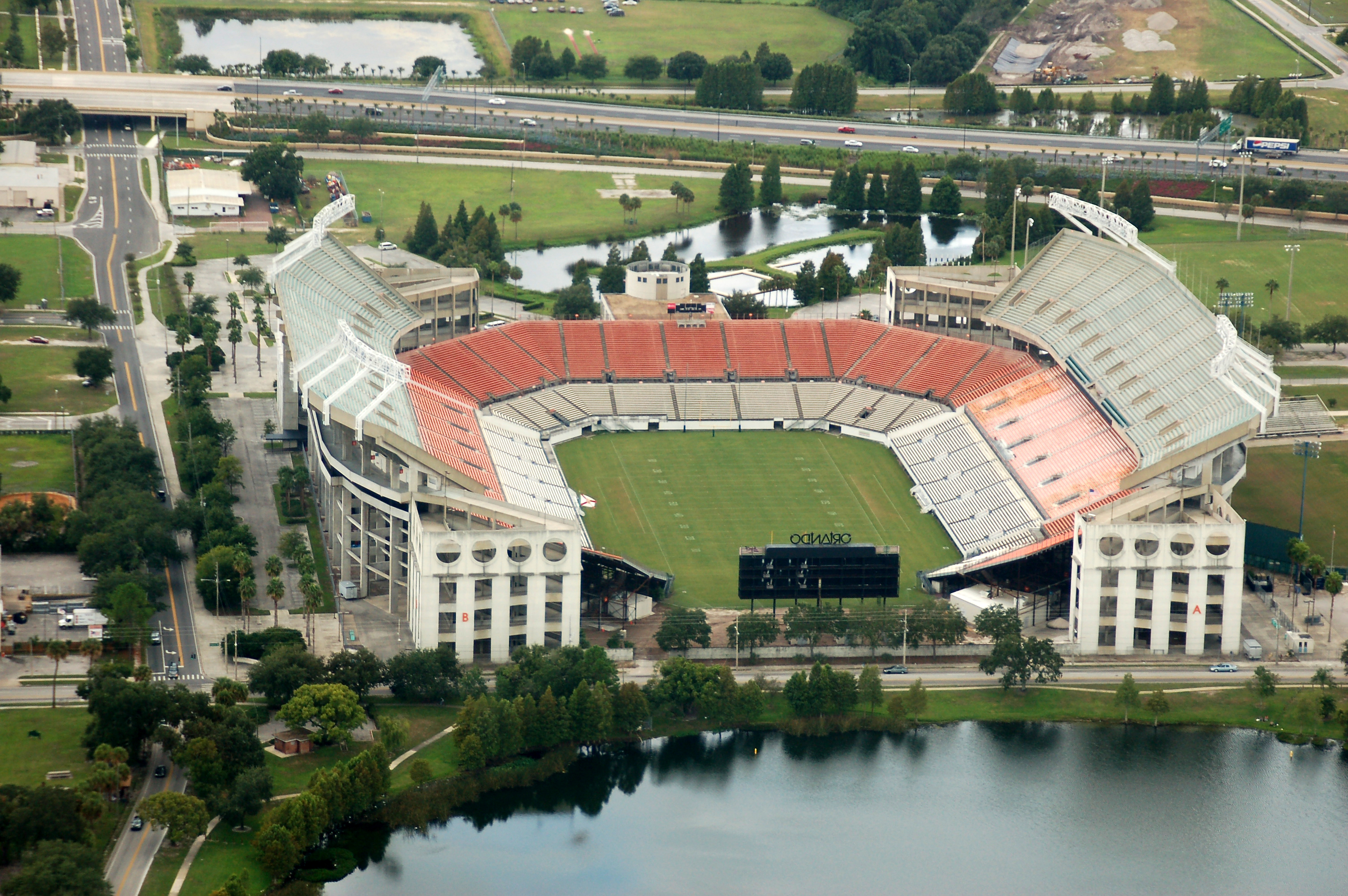
The Florida Citrus Bowl, the Knights' home field

Date	Time	Opponent	Site	TV	Result	Attendance	Source
September 5	7:00 pm	at Louisiana Tech	Joe Aillet Stadium; Rustin, LA	SUN	W 64–30	23,677	
September 12	6:00 pm	Eastern Illinois	Florida Citrus Bowl; Orlando, FL		W 48–0	35,219	
September 19	12:00 pm	at Purdue	Ross–Ade Stadium; West Lafayette, IN	ESPN	L 7–35	53,469	
September 26	12:00 pm	at Bowling Green	Doyt Perry Stadium; Bowling Green, OH	SUN	W 38–31	15,824	
October 3	7:00 pm	at Toledo	Glass Bowl; Toledo, OH	SUN	W 31–24	20,008	
October 10	6:00 pm	Northern Illinois	Florida Citrus Bowl; Orlando, FL		W 38–17	30,415	
October 24	8:00 pm	at Southwestern Louisiana	Cajun Field; Lafayette, LA	SUN	W 42–10	10,124	
October 31	6:00 pm	Youngstown State	Florida Citrus Bowl; Orlando, FL		W 44–32	21,251	
November 7	2:00 pm	at Auburn	Jordan-Hare Stadium; Auburn, AL	SUN	L 6–10	80,743	
November 14	4:00 pm	Ball State	Florida Citrus Bowl; Orlando, FL		W 37–14	31,412	
November 21	1:00 pm	New Mexico	Florida Citrus Bowl; Orlando, FL		W 38–6	19,025	
All times are in Eastern time

== Game summaries ==
=== September 5 — at Louisiana Tech ===
In new head coach Mike Kruczek's debut, the Golden Knights defeated Louisiana Tech by the score of 64–30. Quarterback Daunte Culpepper threw for 370 yards and four touchdown passes without a sack. He also ran for 69 yards and two touchdowns on the ground. UCF built a 17–7 lead in the first quarter. They scored 30 points in the third quarter, and put the game out of reach. Bulldogs quarterback Tim Rattay threw for 524 yards, including a 72-yard touchdown to Troy Edwards, but they could still not keep up with the explosive Golden Knights offense.

=== September 12 — Eastern Illinois ===
In their first home game of the season, UCF shutout I-AA Eastern Illinois 48–0 at the Florida Citrus Bowl. Quarterback Daunte Culpepper threw for 406 yards and four touchdown passes, again without a sack or an interception. The UCF defense achieved their first shutout win since 1994. Despite the win, miscues on offense snuffed out multiple scoring drives. The Golden Knights lost three fumbles, including a fumble into the Panthers end zone that was lost for a touchback. After only two games, Culpepper's stellar passing statistics were drawing attention towards Heisman consideration.

=== September 19 — at Purdue ===
UCF traveled to Purdue for their first ever nationally televised game on ESPN. The 2–0 Golden Knights were looking for their first win against a major opponent, and hoped to showcase the young program, as well as quarterback Daunte Culpepper, on a national stage. The game did not go UCF's way however. Mistakes and sloppy play saw them fall by the lopsided score of 35–7.

After a scoreless first quarter, Purdue took a 7–0 lead. Drew Brees threw an 8-yard touchdown pass to Gabe Cox. Paul Miranda returned the ensuing kickoff 35 yards for UCF, then Daunte Culpepper found Siaha Burley for a 45-yard pass down to the Purdue 3 yard line. Culpepper's pass to Charles Lee in the endzone went off of his hands and was intercepted by Mike Hawthorne. Three yards deep in the endzone, Hawthorne took off down field going the other way. At the UCF 35, Culpepper chased him down to tackle him, but not before he lateralled the ball to teammate Billy Gustin, who ran it the rest of the way for a 103-yard "pick-6" touchdown. It was Culpepper's first interception of the season, and a huge turning point in the game. The Golden Knights later drove inside the red zone, facing a 4th & Goal inside the 1 yard line. Culpepper was going to run a quarterback sneak, but called an audible at the line of scrimmage. He instead lofted a pass to Siaha Burley, but it fell incomplete, and the Golden Knights turned the ball over on downs. The Boilermakers took a 14–0 lead into halftime.

Purdue got the ball to start the second half. Brees exploited a busted coverage, and threw a 38-yard touchdown pass to Cliff Jackson to stretch their lead to 21–0. UCF avoided the shutout, scoring on a 12-yard touchdown pass to Burley late in the fourth quarter. Culpepper finished the day with 368 yards passing, and UCF outgained Purdue 470 yards to 429. However, three turnovers, a blocked field goal, and the turnover on downs inside the 1 ruined any chances for the Golden Knights.

=== September 26 — at Bowling Green ===
UCF traveled to take on winless Bowling Green. The Falcons started off the game with a surprise onside kick, and later executed a fake punt, jumping out to an early 21–7 lead. The Golden Knights rallied in the second half, and came out with a 38–31 victory. Daunte Culpepper threw for 320 yards and four touchdowns, and ran for a touchdown, but also lost a fumble. Culpepper notably moved into first place all-time in school history in career passing yards. Bowling Green had one last chance, scoring a touchdown with just over a minute to go. They attempted an onside kick, but Charles Lee recovered it and UCF ran out the clock to secure the win.

=== October 3 — at Toledo ===
UCF won their second road victory against a MAC opponent, defeating Toledo 31–24. Daunte Culpepper threw for 349 yards and two touchdowns, and ran for 53 yards and a touchdown. With the Rockets leading 24–17 late in the third quarter, Marv Richardson sacked Toledo quarterback Chris Wallace. UCF linebacker Deon Porter scooped up the fumble and ran it back to the Toledo 1 yard line. Three plays later, Culpepper found Blake Thames for a 1-yard touchdown pass, and tied the score 24–24. Later, Mike Grant's 12-yard touchdown run with 7:59 put the Golden Knights ahead for good.

=== October 10 — Northern Illinois ===
The Golden Knights hosted Northern Illinois in their second home game of the season. The winless Huskies entered the game riding a 22-game losing streak, and were 35½ point underdogs. Northern Illinois put a scare into the Knights, tying the score 17–17, before UCF pulled away for a 38–17 victory. Three turnovers (two fumbles and one interception), and poor play on defense kept the Huskies in the game during the first half. Daunte Culpepper's 55-yard touchdown pass to Mark Nonsant late in the third quarter finally put the game out of reach. By the conclusion of the game, Culpepper passed Danny Wuerffel for most career passing yards all-time in the state of Florida.

=== October 24 — at Southwestern Louisiana ===
UCF routed Southwestern Louisiana 42–10 on a record-setting day. Quarterback Daunte Culpepper threw for a then-school record 438 yards, and wide receiver Siaha Burley caught 10 passes (two of which were touchdowns) for a school record 266 yards. Paul Miranda got the rout started early, with a 38-yard interception returned for a touchdown. UCF jumped out to a 21–3 lead, and despite five sacks, controlled the game from start to finish. Culpepper ran for two scores, and threw three touchdown passes of 47 yards, 54 yards, and 50 yards, respectively. The Golden Knights improved to 6–1 on the season.

=== October 31 — Youngstown State ===
UCF hosted defending I-AA Champion Youngstown State on Halloween. The Golden Knights built a 28–3 lead, but the Penguins rallied late to pull within 6 points. With just over 11 minutes left in regulation, wide receiver Eric Leister fumbled a would-be toss back to Daunte Culpepper. Tony Pannunzio recovered the ball and ran it back for a 24-yard touchdown. The Penguins cut the deficit to 38–32. On their next possession, UCF was forced to punt. They were able to pin Youngstown State back at their own 10. The Golden Knights defense forced a three-and-out, and the Penguins punted. A 15-yard personal foul penalty on the return advanced UCF to the 33 yard line. Culpepper took advantage of the short field, and easily drove for another score. UCF padded their lead to 44–32 with 1:41 to go, and held on for the win.

=== November 7 — at Auburn ===
	1	2	3	4	Total
Golden Knights	3	3	0	0	6
Tigers	0	0	3	7	10

UCF traveled to Auburn to take on the Tigers, their second visit to Jordan–Hare Stadium. The previous meeting in 1997 was a lopsided 41–14 loss. The Golden Knights entered the game with a record of 7–1, while the Tigers were 2–6, suffering through a bad season (head coach Terry Bowden resigned In October). The game was seen as an opportunity for the Golden Knights to notch their first victory against a major Division I-A team, first win against an SEC team, and potentially be a program-defining moment. With bowl scouts in attendance, it was also a showcase for the team to potentially earn their first bowl game invitation. In a defensive struggle, what could have been the team's biggest win to-date turned into one of the most heartbreaking losses in program history.

On a cool, crisp, 57-degree afternoon, under blue skies and little breeze, the Golden Knights had about 2,500 fans make the trip to Auburn, said to be their second-largest away game fan contingent at the time. UCF won the coin toss, and elected to receive. Quarterback Daunte Culpepper drove the Golden Knights 58 yards in 14 plays, twice converting on third down. The drive finally stalled at the Auburn 7 yard line. Fred Waczewski kicked a 24-yard field goal, and UCF took a 3–0 lead. Auburn went three-and-out their first drive, and punted right back to UCF. With a mix of short passes and short runs, Culpepper got UCF in Auburn territory again. Facing a 4th & 5 at the Auburn 37, UCF went for it, but Culpepper's pass was intercepted by Larry Casher at the 21.

Early in the second quarter, Auburn got good field position off of a punt, and had the ball to start their drive at the UCF 45. Gabe Gross was intercepted by Damian Demps. The ball was subsequently fumbled, and ultimately recovered by UCF at the Auburn 36. UCF moved quickly, and had a 1st & Goal at the Auburn 3. Two penalties (False start and Delay of game) stymied the drive, however, and on 3rd & Goal from the 10, Culpepper was intercepted for the second time. Jayson Bray picked off the pass at the 5. The UCF defense did their job, and forced Auburn into another three-and-out. Siaha Burley's 26-yard punt return set the Golden Knights up at the Auburn 24. The Auburn defense stiffened, and kept UCF out of the endzone. Waczewski kicked his second field goal of the game, and UCF led 6–0 at halftime.

Auburn got the ball to start the second half. They crossed midfield, but the drive stalled and they again had to punt. UCF took over at their own 15. After crossing midfield, Culpepper was sacked for a loss of 9, then threw an interception, his third of the game. This time, Auburn was able to get points off of the turnover. Rob Bironas made a 44-yard field goal, and the score was now 6–3. Late in the third quarter, UCF found themselves with a 1st & Goal at the Auburn 6. Another red zone turnover, however, snuffed out the scoring opportunity. Culpepper threw his fourth interception, this time it was Larry Casher picking it off at the goal line.

UCF clung to a 6–3 lead into the fourth quarter. With 9:53 to go, Gabe Gross found Rusty Williams for a 12-yard gain down to the UCF 20. However, the UCF defense forced a fumble, and recovered it to shut down the drive. With just over 9 minutes left in regulation, the Golden Knights were looking to run as much time off the clock as they could, and hold on for the win. They went 46 yards in 7 plays, burning nearly 3 minutes off the clock. Head coach Mike Kruczek bluffed going for it on 4th & 2 at the 34, but instead had Chad Downey execute a "pooch punt". He successfully pinned the Tigers back at their own 2 yard line with 7:14 to go. The Tigers managed one first down, but otherwise got nowhere on the drive. Siaha Burley fielded the punt and UCF took over at the 38 yard line with 4:20 left on the clock.

Edward Mack took a handoff for 5 yards on first down, then blasted for a 21-yard gain on second down. He followed that up with an 11-yard run down to the Auburn 36. Culpepper on a quarterback keeper gained 5 yards, and UCF faced a 3rd & 5 at the Auburn 20. With 1:51 left in regulation, center Chris Lorenti made an errant shotgun snap. The ball dribbled at Culpepper's feet, took a funny bounce and was fumbled away for a 9-yard loss. Auburn recovered the loose ball at the 29 yard line with 1:43 to go.

Gabe Gross threw three straight incompletions, and quickly it was 4th & 10. A stop on fourth down would have likely iced the game. Gross found Clifton Robinson on a comeback route for a 13-yard gain and a first down. With 1:22 left and counting, Gross hit Karsten Bailey on a short out. The Knights defense missed a tackle, and Bailey turned upfield and sprinted down the sidelines for an improbable 58-yard go-ahead touchdown. With 57 seconds left, UCF had last shot. Culpepper connected with Charles Lee for a 19-yard completion, but with the clock ticking, the Golden Knights were running out of time. Culpepper's threw up a Hail Mary as time expired, but it was for naught. Auburn escaped with a 10–6 victory.

The Golden Knights dominated the time of possession (38:14), outgained the Tigers 278–240, made five trips inside the red zone, but came up with only 6 points. Culpepper threw four interceptions, lost a fumble, and was sacked seven times, his worst game of the 1998 season. Nevertheless, UCF was just over a minute away from an upset victory. It was the first of two back-to-back near-misses at Auburn.

=== November 14 — Ball State ===
UCF hosted Ball State (1–8) on Homecoming. A sluggish first half for the Golden Knights resulted in a 7–7 tie at halftime. The Cardinals managed 277 yards rushing on 50 carries, sparking fears of an upset. But momentum shifted mightily in the second half. UCF put up 30 points in the second half, and pulled away for a 37–14 victory. Quarterback Daunte Culpepper threw a 28-yard touchdown pass to Charles Lee to start the third quarter, and gave UCF a 14–7 lead. On the next drive, James Terrell fumbled the ball for the Cardinals. Davin Bush scooped up the fumble and ran it back 15 yards for a touchdown. In the fourth quarter, with UCF leading 31–14, Bush intercepted a pass from Clay Walters. He returned the ball to the 9 yard line, setting up a 10-yard touchdown pass to Ben Goldberg with 4:35 left, which iced the game for the Golden Knights.

=== November 21 — New Mexico ===
UCF hosted New Mexico in their season finale. The game was played as part of doubleheader at the Citrus Bowl with the Florida Classic. The Golden Knights dominated the Lobos, winning 38–6, and finished the regular season with a record of 9–2. In his final game with UCF, quarterback Daunte Culpepper threw for 263 yards and two touchdown passes. He also rushed for 94 yards on 18 carries.

The Golden Knights won the coin toss and elected to receive. On the third play of the game, Daunte Culpepper broke free for a 53-yard run down to the Lobos 20 yard line. On the very next play, Culpepper completed a 15-yard screen pass to Mark Nonsant. But Marcus McDavid forced a fumble, and Brian Urlacher recovered the ball for New Mexico at their own 3 yard line. The Lobos then drove 97 yards in 14 plays. They finished the drive with a 9-yard touchdown run by Kevin Leigh. UCF answered with a 41-yard kickoff return by Edward Mack, which set up a 2-yard touchdown run by Mike Grant.

Culpepper's 31-yard quarterback draw put UCF in position for their second touchdown. Culpepper's 13-yard touchdown pass to Mark Nonsant made the score 12–6 early in the second quarter. Siaha Burley's 34-yard punt return set the Golden Knights up in New Mexico territory on the next drive. With just over three minutes left in the first half, Grant's second rushing touchdown made the score 18–6.

New Mexico got the ball to start the third quarter. Facing 3rd & 9 at their own 23 yard line, Graham Leigh's pass was intercepted by Justen Moore, and UCF took over at the 11. One play later, Culpepper found Burley for an 11-yard touchdown. Kicker Fred Waczewski missed his fourth extra point of the game, and UCF's lead was 24–6. The Lobos were facing a 4th & 19 near midfield to start the fourth quarter. Siaha Burley's 91-yard punt return touchdown put the Golden Knights up 31–6. It was longest punt return in school history. Back-up quarterback Jason Thorpe came into the game late in the fourth quarter, and added a touchdown pass for a final score of 38–6.

== Postseason ==
Daunte Culpepper finished his college career with 11,412 total passing yards and 84 touchdown passes (both categories still are school records as of 2022). His single-season total of 3,690 passing yards was also a school record at the time. He was responsible for a school-record 108 career touchdowns (passing & rushing), and compiled 12,432 total career scrimmage yards (passing & rushing). He became only the third college quarterback in NCAA history to pass for 10,000+ yards and rush for 1,000+ yards. Culpepper finished sixth in the Heisman voting, won the Sammy Baugh Trophy, and notably set an NCAA single-season record for best completion percentage (73.6%).

Scouts for multiple bowls visited UCF's games in the latter part of the season. At 9–2, and with a Heisman-candidate quarterback, the Golden Knights were in a strong position for an at-large bid. However, the last-minute loss at Auburn, and lack of school name recognition, may have swayed some opinions. A representative from the Liberty Bowl attended two games, but politely declined to offer UCF an invitation. Officials from the Micron PC Bowl were at the season finale, and were said to be courting the Golden Knights for an at-large bid. The offer was originally predicated on Michigan State losing at #23 Penn State on November 28, which would have left the Big Ten without a qualified team to fill their scheduled berth. The Spartans lost the game to finish 6–6 and not bowl-eligible. However, the Micron PC Bowl elected to invite Miami instead.

After other rumored links to the Aloha, Motor City, and Music City bowls never materialized, UCF received a provisional invitation to the Oahu Bowl (December 25) to face the WAC champion #16 Air Force. The invitation, however, came with a condition. No. 1 ranked UCLA had to defeat Miami on December 5, and as a result, assure themselves a spot in the BCS National Championship Game (Fiesta Bowl). In a stunning upset, Miami beat the previously undefeated Bruins 49–45. The result had a cascading effect on several bowls, including the Oahu, which had to drop UCF's invitation.

A last-minute shot at the Sun Bowl fell through when the committee selected TCU. A handful of other bowl vacancies filled up, and UCF was left out of the bowl picture, despite finishing 9–2. Only 10–1 Miami (OH) finished with a better record and did not go to a bowl. The disappointment of not going to a bowl game reflected on UCF still being a Division I-A Independent, without any contractual bowl tie-ins. In the years to follow, the school would aggressively lobby to join a conference, and as a result, have an automatic bowl tie-in(s) available. The Knights joined the MAC in 2002, then switched to C-USA in 2005, and made their first bowl appearance in 2005.

Without a bowl to play in, Daunte Culpepper and five other UCF players accepted invitations to play in the Gridiron Classic, a post-season all-star game that coincidentally was played in UCF's home stadium, the Citrus Bowl. Culpepper threw for 134 yards, and had a rushing touchdown, earning the game's offensive MPV award.
