= 1998 Northeast Louisiana Indians football team =

American college football season

1998 Northeast Louisiana Indians football
- Conference: Independent
- Record: 5–6
- Head coach: Ed Zaunbrecher (5th season)
- Offensive coordinator: Ed Zaunbrecher (5th season)
- Defensive coordinator: Drew Fabianich (3rd season)
- Home stadium: Malone Stadium

1998 NCAA Division I-A independents football records
	Conf.			Overall
Team	W		L	W		L
UCF		–		9	–	2
No. 22 Notre Dame		–		9	–	3
Louisiana Tech		–		6	–	6
Northeast Louisiana		–		5	–	6
UAB		–		4	–	7
Arkansas State		–		4	–	8
Navy		–		3	–	8
Southwestern Louisiana		–		2	–	9
Rankings from AP Poll

The 1998 Northeast Louisiana Indians football team represented Northeast Louisiana University (now known as the University of Louisiana at Monroe) as an independent during the 1998 NCAA Division I-A football season. Led by fifth-year head coach Ed Zaunbrecher, the Indians compiled an overall record of 5–6, and the offense scored 227 points while the defense allowed 322 points. The team played home games at Malone Stadium in Monroe, Louisiana.

== Schedule ==
Date	Time	Opponent	Site	Result	Attendance	Source
September 5		Nicholls State	Malone Stadium; Monroe, LA	W 44–10		
September 12		at No. 3 Florida	Ben Hill Griffin Stadium; Gainesville, FL	L 10–42	85,228	
September 19		No. 24 (I-AA) Stephen F. Austin	Malone Stadium; Monroe, LA	W 21–10	13,908	
September 26	1:10 pm	at No. 5 Kansas State	KSU Stadium; Manhattan, KS	L 7–62	42,029	
October 3		at Western Michigan	Waldo Stadium; Kalamazoo, MI	L 14–27	15,037	
October 10		Louisiana Tech	Malone Stadium; Monroe, LA	L 14–44	28,725	
October 24		at No. 14 Arizona	Arizona Stadium; Tucson, AZ	L 7–45	39,218	
October 31	7:00 pm	UAB	Malone Stadium; Monroe, LA	W 20–14	11,886	
November 7		Southwestern Louisiana	Malone Stadium; Monroe, LA (Battle on the Bayou)	W 34–24	12,647	
November 14		at Arkansas State	Indian Stadium; Jonesboro, AR	L 13–17	5,192	
November 21		Portland State	Malone Stadium; Monroe, LA	W 43–27	12,160	
Rankings from AP Poll released prior to the game; All times are in Central time
