= 1998 Southwest Missouri State Bears football team =

American college football season

1998 Southwest Missouri State Bears football
- Conference: Gateway Football Conference
- Record: 5–6 (3–3 GFC)
- Head coach: Del Miller (4th season)
- Offensive coordinator: Tim Beck (1st season)
- Co-defensive coordinators: J. C. Harper (2nd season); Bob Boyce (2nd season)
- Captains: Tony Flint; Derek Jensen; Michael Holloway; Corky Martin
- Home stadium: Plaster Sports Complex

1998 Gateway Football Conference standings
	Conf.			Overall
Team	W		L	W		L
No. 4 Western Illinois $^	5	–	1	11	–	3
No. 16 Illinois State ^	4	–	2	8	–	4
Northern Iowa	3	–	3	7	–	4
Youngstown State	3	–	3	6	–	5
Southwest Missouri State	3	–	3	5	–	6
Indiana State	2	–	4	5	–	6
Southern Illinois	1	–	5	3	–	8
$ – Conference champion; ^ – NCAA Division I-AA playoff participant; Rankings from The Sports Network poll

The 1998 Southwest Missouri State Bears football team represented Southwest Missouri State University (now known as Missouri State University) as a member of the Gateway Football Conference (GFC) during the 1998 NCAA Division I-AA football season. Led by fourth-year head coach Del Miller, the Bears compiled an overall record of 5–6, with a mark of 3–3 in conference play, and finished tied for third in the GFC.

== Schedule ==
Date	Opponent	Site	Result	Attendance	Source
September 5	at Tulsa*	Skelly Stadium; Tulsa, OK	L 14–49	24,332	
September 12	Harding*	Plaster Sports Complex; Springfield, MO	W 52–12	13,580	
September 19	at Arkansas State*	Indian Stadium; Jonesboro, AR	L 24–28		
October 3	at No. 17 Northern Iowa	UNI-Dome; Cedar Falls, IA	W 24–21	14,103	
October 10	No. 5 Western Illinois	Plaster Sports Complex; Springfield, MO	L 13–20	12,377	
October 17	at Indiana State	Memorial Stadium; Terre Haute, IN	L 14–24		
October 24	Southeast Missouri State*	Plaster Sports Complex; Springfield, MO	W 45–10	13,122	
October 31	Southern Illinois	Plaster Sports Complex; Springfield, MO	W 28–13	6,149	
November 7	at No. 21 Illinois State	Hancock Stadium; Normal, IL	W 49–42	5,297	
November 14	No. 25 Cal State Northridge*	Plaster Sports Complex; Springfield, MO	L 38–42	7,574	
November 21	Youngstown State	Plaster Sports Complex; Springfield, MO	L 17–24	5,072	
*Non-conference game; Rankings from The Sports Network Poll released prior to the game
