= 1998 Western Illinois Leathernecks football team =

American college football season

1998 Western Illinois Leathernecks football

Gateway champion

NCAA Division I-AA Semifinal, L 14–42 at Georgia Southern
- Conference: Gateway Football Conference

Ranking
- Sports Network: No. 4
- Record: 11–3 (5–1 Gateway)
- Head coach: Randy Ball (9th season)
- Home stadium: Hanson Field

1998 Gateway Football Conference standings
	Conf.			Overall
Team	W		L	W		L
No. 4 Western Illinois $^	5	–	1	11	–	3
No. 16 Illinois State ^	4	–	2	8	–	4
Northern Iowa	3	–	3	7	–	4
Youngstown State	3	–	3	6	–	5
Southwest Missouri State	3	–	3	5	–	6
Indiana State	2	–	4	5	–	6
Southern Illinois	1	–	5	3	–	8
$ – Conference champion; ^ – NCAA Division I-AA playoff participant; Rankings from The Sports Network poll

The 1998 Western Illinois Leathernecks football team represented Western Illinois University as a member of the Gateway Football Conference during the 1998 NCAA Division I-AA football season. They were led by ninth-year head coach Randy Ball and played their home games at Hanson Field. The Leathernecks finished the season with an 11–3 record overall and a 5–1 record in conference play, making them conference champions. The team received an automatic bid to the NCAA Division I-AA Football Championship playoffs, where they defeated Montana and Florida A&M before losing to Georgia Southern in the semifinals. The team was ranked No. 4 in The Sports Network's postseason ranking of Division I-AA.

== Schedule ==
Date	Opponent	Rank	Site	Result	Attendance	Source
September 3	St. Cloud State*	No. 8	Hanson Field; Macomb, IL	W 23–7	7,417	
September 12	at Central Michigan*	No. 11	Kelly/Shorts Stadium; Mount Pleasant, MI	L 14–35	26,412	
September 19	at Elon*	No. 17	Burlington Memorial Stadium; Burlington, NC	W 17–7	6,241	
September 26	Southern Utah*	No. 14	Hanson Field; Macomb, IL	W 31–3		
October 3	No. 1 Youngstown State	No. 11	Hanson Field; Macomb, IL	W 14–0	10,304	
October 10	at Southwest Missouri State	No. 5	Robert W. Plaster Stadium; Springfield, MO	W 20–13	12,377	
October 17	at Southern Illinois	No. 5	McAndrew Stadium; Carbondale, IL	W 13–3	12,600	
October 24	No. 18 Illinois State	No. 3	Hanson Field; Macomb, IL	W 37–10	16,741	
October 31	at Buffalo*	No. 3	University at Buffalo Stadium; Amherst, NY	W 41–6	18,648	
November 7	Indiana State	No. 2	Memorial Stadium; Terre Haute, IN	W 26–9	7,994	
November 14	at Northern Iowa	No. 2	UNI-Dome; Cedar Falls, IA	L 6–10	12,118	
November 28	No. 14 Montana*	No. 4	Hanson Field; Macomb, IL (NCAA Division I-AA First Round)	W 52–9	3,614	
December 5	No. 3 Florida A&M*	No. 4	Hanson Field; Macomb, IL (NCAA Division I-AA Quarterfinal)	W 24–21	7,400	
December 12	at No. 1 Georgia Southern*	No. 4	Paulson Stadium; Statesboro, GA (NCAA Division I-AA Semifinal)	L 14–42	11,140	
*Non-conference game; Rankings from The Sports Network Poll released prior to the game
