= 1998 McNeese State Cowboys football team =

American college football season

1998 McNeese State Cowboys football

NCAA Division I-AA First Round, L 19–21 vs. UMass
- Conference: Southland Conference

Ranking
- Sports Network: No. 8
- Record: 9–3 (5–2 Southland)
- Head coach: Bobby Keasler (9th season)
- Offensive coordinator: Mike Santiago (9th season)
- Defensive coordinator: Kirby Bruchhaus (9th season)
- Home stadium: Cowboy Stadium

1998 Southland Football League standings
	Conf.			Overall
Team	W		L	W		L
No. 3 Northwestern State $^	6	–	1	11	–	3
No. 8 McNeese State ^	5	–	2	9	–	3
No. 13 Troy State ^	5	–	2	8	–	4
Jacksonville State	4	–	3	7	–	4
Nicholls State	3	–	4	4	–	7
Southwest Texas State	2	–	5	4	–	7
Stephen F. Austin	2	–	5	3	–	8
Sam Houston State	1	–	6	3	–	8
$ – Conference champion; ^ – NCAA Division I-AA playoff participant; Rankings from The Sports Network poll

The 1998 McNeese State Cowboys football team was an American football team that represented McNeese State University as a member of the Southland Conference (Southland) during the 1998 NCAA Division I-AA football season. In their ninth year under head coach Bobby Keasler, the team compiled an overall record of 9–3, with a mark of 5–2 in conference play, and finished tied for second in the Southland. The Cowboys advanced to the Division I-AA playoffs and lost to UMass in the first round.

== Schedule ==
Date	Time	Opponent	Rank	Site	Result	Attendance	Source
September 5		Southeastern Oklahoma State*	No. 2	Cowboy Stadium; Lake Charles, LA	W 43–3		
September 12	6:30 p.m.	at No. 5 Northern Iowa*	No. 2	Memorial Stadium; Waterloo, IA	W 20–17 ^{OT}	5,840	
September 19		at No. 22 Southern Utah*	No. 2	Eccles Coliseum; Cedar City, UT	W 66–17		
September 26		Arkansas–Monticello*	No. 2	Cowboy Stadium; Lake Charles, LA	W 65–7	17,052	
October 10		Jacksonville State	No. 1	Cowboy Stadium; Lake Charles, LA	W 30–14	17,000	
October 15		at No. 8 Northwestern State	No. 1	Harry Turpin Stadium; Natchitoches, LA (rivalry)	L 10–14	14,247	
October 24		Stephen F. Austin	No. 5	Cowboy Stadium; Lake Charles, LA	W 20–17	17,500	
October 31		at Sam Houston State	No. 5	Bowers Stadium; Huntsville, TX	W 35–13		
November 7		Southwest Texas State	No. 3	Cowboy Stadium; Lake Charles, LA	W 27–0		
November 14		at No. 9 Troy State	No. 3	Veterans Memorial Stadium; Troy, AL	W 23–3	16,125	
November 21		Nicholls State	No. 2	Cowboy Stadium; Lake Charles, LA	L 20–31		
November 28		No. 12 UMass*	No. 6	Cowboy Stadium; Lake Charles, LA (NCAA Division I-AA First Round)	L 19–21	11,349	
*Non-conference game; Rankings from The Sports Network Poll released prior to the game; All times are in Central time
