= 1998 Northwestern State Demons football team =

American college football season

1998 Northwestern State Demons football

Southland champion

NCAA Division I-AA Semifinal, L 31–41 vs. UMass
- Conference: Southland Conference

Ranking
- Sports Network: No. 3
- Record: 11–3 (6–1 Southland)
- Head coach: Sam Goodwin (16th season)
- Offensive coordinator: Doug Ruse (2nd season)
- Defensive coordinator: Bradley Dale Peveto (3rd season)
- Home stadium: Harry Turpin Stadium

1998 Southland Football League standings
	Conf.			Overall
Team	W		L	W		L
No. 3 Northwestern State $^	6	–	1	11	–	3
No. 8 McNeese State ^	5	–	2	9	–	3
No. 13 Troy State ^	5	–	2	8	–	4
Jacksonville State	4	–	3	7	–	4
Nicholls State	3	–	4	4	–	7
Southwest Texas State	2	–	5	4	–	7
Stephen F. Austin	2	–	5	3	–	8
Sam Houston State	1	–	6	3	–	8
$ – Conference champion; ^ – NCAA Division I-AA playoff participant; Rankings from The Sports Network poll

The 1998 Northwestern State Demons football team represented Northwestern State University as a member of the Southland Conference during the 1998 NCAA Division I-AA football season. Led by 16th-year head coach Sam Goodwin, the Demons compiled an overall record of 11–3 with a mark of 6–1 in conference play, winning the Southland title. Northwestern State advanced to the NCAA Division I-AA Football Championship playoffs, where the Demons beat Illinois State in the first round and Appalachian State in the quarterfinals before losing to the eventual national champion, UMass in the semifinals. The team played home games at Harry Turpin Stadium in Natchitoches, Louisiana.

== Schedule ==
Date	Time	Opponent	Rank	Site	Result	Attendance	Source
September 5		No. 12 Southern*	No. 16	Harry Turpin Stadium; Natchitoches, LA	W 28–7	16,706	
September 12		at Southwestern Louisiana*	No. 14	Cajun Field; Lafayette, LA	W 24–22		
September 19		Henderson State*	No. 10	Harry Turpin Stadium; Natchitoches, LA	W 53–7		
September 26		at Southwest Texas State	No. 8	Bobcat Stadium; San Marcos, TX	W 34–10		
October 3	1:00 p.m.	at No. 25 (I-A) Missouri*	No. 7	Faurot Field; Columbia, MO	L 14–35	48,298	
October 15		No. 1 McNeese State	No. 8	Harry Turpin Stadium; Natchitoches, LA (rivalry)	W 14–10	14,247	
October 24		at Nicholls State	No. 4	John L. Guidry Stadium; Thibodaux, LA (rivalry)	W 28–26		
October 31		No. 15 Troy State	No. 4	Harry Turpin Stadium; Natchitoches, LA	L 13–14	10,362	
November 7	2:00 p.m.	No. 22 Jacksonville State	No. 9	Harry Turpin Stadium; Natchitoches, LA	W 53–36	12,779	
November 14		Sam Houston State	No. 7	Harry Turpin Stadium; Natchitoches, LA	W 59–3	5,117	
November 21		at Stephen F. Austin	No. 5	Homer Bryce Stadium; Nacogdoches, TX (rivalry)	W 35–21		
November 28		No. 21 Illinois State*	No. 2	Harry Turpin Stadium; Natchitoches, LA (NCAA Division I-AA First Round)	W 48–28	8,118	
December 5		No. 7 Appalachian State*	No. 2	Harry Turpin Stadium; Natchitoches, LA (NCAA Division I-AA Quarterfinal)	W 31–20	10,817	
December 12	1:00 p.m.	No. 12 UMass*	No. 2	Harry Turpin Stadium; Natchitoches, LA (NCAA Division I-AA Semifinal)	L 31–41	10,424	
*Non-conference game; Rankings from The Sports Network Poll released prior to the game; All times are in Central time
