= 1998 Northern Iowa Panthers football team =

American college football season

1998 Northern Iowa Panthers football
- Conference: Gateway Football Conference
- Record: 7–4 (3–3 Gateway)
- Head coach: Mike Dunbar (2nd season)
- Offensive coordinator: Bret Ingalls (2nd season)
- Home stadium: UNI-Dome

1998 Gateway Football Conference standings
| | Conf. | | | Overall |
| Team | W | | L | W | | L |
|---|---|---|---|---|---|---|
| No. 4 Western Illinois $^ | 5 | – | 1 | 11 | – | 3 |
| No. 16 Illinois State ^ | 4 | – | 2 | 8 | – | 4 |
| Northern Iowa | 3 | – | 3 | 7 | – | 4 |
| Youngstown State | 3 | – | 3 | 6 | – | 5 |
| Southwest Missouri State | 3 | – | 3 | 5 | – | 6 |
| Indiana State | 2 | – | 4 | 5 | – | 6 |
| Southern Illinois | 1 | – | 5 | 3 | – | 8 |
$ – Conference champion; ^ – NCAA Division I-AA playoff participant; Rankings from The Sports Network poll

The 1998 Northern Iowa Panthers football team was an American football team that represented the University of Northern Iowa as a member of the Gateway Football Conference (Gateway Conference) during the 1998 NCAA Division I-AA football season. In its second year under head coach Mike Dunbar, the team compiled a 7–4 record (3–3 in conference games), were outscored opponents by a total of 288 to 191, and tied for third place in the Gateway Conference.

The team's statistical leaders included Ryan Helming (2,475 passing yards), wide receiver Mike Furrey (86 receptions for 1,074 yards, 60 points scored), Steve Jenkins (829 rushing yards), and Matt Pedersen (121 total tackles). Five Northern Iowa players received first-team honors on the 1998 all-Gateway Conference football team: Furrey offensive linemen Matt Beals and Brad Meester; linebacker Matt Pedersen; and defensive back Tyree Talton.

The team played its home games at the UNI-Dome in Cedar Falls, Iowa.

== Schedule ==
| Date | Time | Opponent | Rank | Site | Result | Attendance | Source |
|---|---|---|---|---|---|---|---|
| September 3 | 5:00 p.m. | at Eastern Michigan* | No. 5 | Rynearson Stadium; Ypsilanti, MI | W 13–10 | 12,305 | |
| September 12 | 6:30 p.m. | No. 2 McNeese State* | No. 5 | UNI-Dome; Cedar Falls, IA | L 17–20 ^{OT} | 5,840 | |
| September 19 | 1:30 p.m. | at Southern Illinois | No. 6 | McAndrew Stadium; Carbondale, IL | L 20–27 | 6,500 | |
| September 26 | 7:00 p.m. | at Stephen F. Austin* | No. 17 | Homer Bryce Stadium; Nacogdoches, TX | W 14–10 | 10,939 | |
| October 3 | 6:30 p.m. | Southwest Missouri State | No. 17 | UNI-Dome; Cedar Falls, IA | L 21–24 | 14,103 | |
| October 10 | 6:30 p.m. | Illinois State | | UNI-Dome; Cedar Falls, IA | L 23–38 | 8,369 | |
| October 17 | 1:30 p.m. | Cal Poly^{†} | | UNI-Dome; Cedar Falls, IA | W 31–7 | 13,117 | |
| October 31 | 12:30 p.m. | at Indiana State | | Memorial Stadium; Terre Haute, IN | W 31–28 | 3,237 | |
| November 7 | 12:00 p.m. | at No. 17 Youngstown State | | Stambaugh Stadium; Youngstown, OH | W 42–14 | 12,966 | |
| November 14 | 6:30 p.m. | No. 2 Western Illinois | | UNI-Dome; Cedar Falls, IA | W 10–6 | 12,118 | |
| November 21 | 6:30 p.m. | No. 20 (D-II) Winona State* | No. 25 | UNI-Dome; Cedar Falls, IA | W 66–7 | 10,121 | |
*Non-conference game; ^{†}Homecoming; Rankings from The Sports Network Poll released prior to the game; All times are in Central time
