= 1998 Jacksonville State Gamecocks football team =

American college football season

1998 Jacksonville State Gamecocks football
- Conference: Southland Football League
- Record: 7–4 (4–3 Southland)
- Head coach: Mike Williams (2nd season)
- Offensive coordinator: Doug Meacham (2nd season)
- Defensive coordinator: Charles Kelly (2nd season)
- Home stadium: Paul Snow Stadium

1998 Southland Football League standings
	Conf.			Overall
Team	W		L	W		L
No. 3 Northwestern State $^	6	–	1	11	–	3
No. 8 McNeese State ^	5	–	2	9	–	3
No. 13 Troy State ^	5	–	2	8	–	4
Jacksonville State	4	–	3	7	–	4
Nicholls State	3	–	4	4	–	7
Southwest Texas State	2	–	5	4	–	7
Stephen F. Austin	2	–	5	3	–	8
Sam Houston State	1	–	6	3	–	8
$ – Conference champion; ^ – NCAA Division I-AA playoff participant; Rankings from The Sports Network poll

The 1998 Jacksonville State Gamecocks football team represented Jacksonville State University as a member of the Southland Football League during the 1998 NCAA Division I-AA football season. Led by second-year head coach Mike Williams, the Gamecocks compiled an overall record of 7–4 with a mark of 4–3 in conference play, placing fourth in the Southland. Jacksonville State played home games at Paul Snow Stadium in Jacksonville, Alabama.

== Schedule ==
Date	Time	Opponent	Rank	Site	Result	Attendance	Source
September 5	2:00 p.m.	at Alabama A&M*		Louis Crews Stadium; Normal, AL	W 19–13	14,673	
September 12	12:00 p.m.	at No. 6 Georgia Southern*		Paulson Stadium; Statesboro, GA	L 32–51	10,803	
September 19	7:00 p.m.	No. 20 Middle Tennessee*		Paul Snow Stadium; Jacksonville, AL	W 10–7	12,678	
September 26	6:30 p.m.	at Nicholls State		John L. Guidry Stadium; Thibodaux, LA	W 21–20	2,418	
October 1	6:00 p.m.	Stephen F. Austin		Paul Snow Stadium; Jacksonville, AL	W 22–16	13,027	
October 10	7:00 p.m.	at No. 1 McNeese State		Cowboy Stadium; Lake Charles, LA	L 14–30	17,000	
October 17	2:00 p.m.	Samford*		Paul Snow Stadium; Jacksonville, AL (rivalry)	W 21–0	12,789	
October 24	2:00 p.m.	Sam Houston State		Paul Snow Stadium; Jacksonville, AL	W 31–19	5,237	
November 7	2:00 p.m.	No. 9 Northwestern State	No. 22	Paul Snow Stadium; Jacksonville, AL	L 36–53	12,779	
November 14	2:00 p.m.	at Southwest Texas State	No. 24	Bobcat Stadium; San Marcos, TX	W 33–27	4,825	
November 21	2:00 p.m.	No. 14 Troy State	No. 24	Paul Snow Stadium; Jacksonville, AL (rivalry)	L 7–31	14,987	
*Non-conference game; Rankings from The Sports Network Poll released prior to the game; All times are in Central time
