= 1998 Youngstown State Penguins football team =

American college football season

1998 Youngstown State Penguins football
- Conference: Gateway Football Conference
- Record: 6–5 (3–3 Gateway)
- Head coach: Jim Tressel (13th season)
- Home stadium: Stambaugh Stadium

1998 Gateway Football Conference standings
	Conf.			Overall
Team	W		L	W		L
No. 4 Western Illinois $^	5	–	1	11	–	3
No. 16 Illinois State ^	4	–	2	8	–	4
Northern Iowa	3	–	3	7	–	4
Youngstown State	3	–	3	6	–	5
Southwest Missouri State	3	–	3	5	–	6
Indiana State	2	–	4	5	–	6
Southern Illinois	1	–	5	3	–	8
$ – Conference champion; ^ – NCAA Division I-AA playoff participant; Rankings from The Sports Network poll

The 1998 Youngstown State Penguins football team represented Youngstown State University in the 1998 NCAA Division I-AA football season. The team was led by Jim Tressel in his thirteenth season as head coach and played its home games at Stambaugh Stadium in Youngstown, Ohio. The Penguins finished the season with a 6–5 record overall and a 3–3 record in Gateway Football Conference games.

== Schedule ==
Date	Opponent	Rank	Site	Result	Attendance	Source
September 3	Clarion*	No. 1	Stambaugh Stadium; Youngstown, OH	W 50–6	16,416	
September 12	at Kent State*	No. 1	Dix Stadium; Kent, OH	W 24–10	17,782	
September 19	Indiana State	No. 1	Stambaugh Stadium; Youngstown, OH	W 20–14	18,162	
October 3	at No. 11 Western Illinois	No. 1	Hanson Field; Macomb, IL	L 0–14	10,304	
October 10	Southern Illinois^{†}	No. 7	Stambaugh Stadium; Youngstown, OH	W 34–21	20,380	
October 17	No. 10 Delaware*	No. 6	Stambaugh Stadium; Youngstown, OH	L 20–30	17,107	
October 24	New Haven*	No. 11	Stambaugh Stadium; Youngstown, OH	W 18–15 ^{OT}	12,787	
October 31	at UCF*	No. 10	Florida Citrus Bowl; Orlando, FL	L 32–44	21,251	
November 7	Northern Iowa	No. 17	Stambaugh Stadium; Youngstown, OH	L 14–42	12,966	
November 14	at Illinois State		Hancock Stadium; Normal, IL	L 14–48	5,962	
November 21	at Southwest Missouri State		Plaster Sports Complex; Springfield, MO	W 24–17	5,072	
*Non-conference game; ^{†}Homecoming; Rankings from The Sports Network Poll released prior to the game
