= 1998 Southern Illinois Salukis football team =

American college football season

1998 Southern Illinois Salukis football
- Conference: Gateway Football Conference
- Record: 3–8 (1–5 Gateway)
- Head coach: Jan Quarless (2nd season)
- Home stadium: McAndrew Stadium

1998 Gateway Football Conference standings
	Conf.			Overall
Team	W		L	W		L
No. 4 Western Illinois $^	5	–	1	11	–	3
No. 16 Illinois State ^	4	–	2	8	–	4
Northern Iowa	3	–	3	7	–	4
Youngstown State	3	–	3	6	–	5
Southwest Missouri State	3	–	3	5	–	6
Indiana State	2	–	4	5	–	6
Southern Illinois	1	–	5	3	–	8
$ – Conference champion; ^ – NCAA Division I-AA playoff participant; Rankings from The Sports Network poll

The 1998 Southern Illinois Salukis football team represented Southern Illinois University as a member of the Gateway Football Conference during the 1998 NCAA Division I-AA football season. They were led by second-year head coach Jan Quarless and played their home games at McAndrew Stadium in Carbondale, Illinois. The Salukis finished the season with a 3–8 record overall and a 1–5 record in conference play.

== Schedule ==
Date	Time	Opponent	Site	Result	Attendance	Source
September 5		at No. 23 Murray State*	Roy Stewart Stadium; Murray, KY	L 13–41	8,941	
September 12		at Tennessee–Martin*	Skyhawk Stadium; Martin, TN	W 36–7	5,023	
September 19	1:30 p.m.	No. 6 Northern Iowa	McAndrew Stadium; Carbondale, IL	W 27–20	6,500	
September 26		at Illinois State	Hancock Stadium; Normal, IL	L 38–41 ^{OT}	9,611	
October 3		Southwest Texas State*	McAndrew Stadium; Carbondale, IL	L 25–30	8,500	
October 10		at No. 7 Youngstown State	Stambaugh Stadium; Youngstown, OH	L 21–34	20,380	
October 17		No. 5 Western Illinois	McAndrew Stadium; Carbondale, IL	L 3–13	12,600	
October 24		Indiana State	McAndrew Stadium; Carbondale, IL	L 21–27	4,000	
October 31		at Southwest Missouri State	Plaster Sports Complex; Springfield, MO	L 13–28	6,149	
November 7		at No. 18 Western Kentucky*	L. T. Smith Stadium; Bowling Green, KY	L 28–48	4,400	
November 14		at Southeast Missouri State*	Houck Stadium; Cape Girardeau, MO	W 34–7	2,500	
*Non-conference game; Rankings from The Sports Network Poll released prior to the game; All times are in Central time
