= Del Miller =

American football player and coach (born 1950)

Biographical details
- Born: November 6, 1950 (age 75); Marengo, Iowa, U.S.

Playing career
- c. 1970: Central (IA)
- Positions: Linebacker, fullback, defensive back

Coaching career (HC unless noted)
- 1972–1974: Plainfield HS (IA)
- 1975–1976: Eagle Grove HS (IA) (DC)
- 1977: Eagle Grove HS (IA)
- 1978–1988: Iowa (assistant)
- 1989–1990: Kansas State (OC)
- 1991–1994: Kansas State (AHC/OC)
- 1995–1998: Southwest Missouri State
- 2000: Oklahoma State (OC)
- 2001–2002: Kansas State (assistant)
- 2002–2003: Kansas State (DE)
- 2003–2005: Kansas State (co-OC/QB)
- 2006–2008: San Diego State (OC/QB)
- 2009–2016: Kansas State (OC/QB)

Head coaching record
- Overall: 21–23 (college)

Del Miller (born November 6, 1950) is an American former football coach. He served as the head football coach at Southwest Missouri State University—now known as Missouri State University—from 1995 to 1998, compiling a record of 21–23. Miller was a longtime assistant to Kansas State University under head coach Bill Snyder. He was the first assistant hired by Snyder in 1989, and has served three separate stints with the program. Miller and Snyder had previously coached together as assistants at the University of Iowa under Hayden Fry. Miller shared the offensive coordinator duties at Kansas State with Dana Dimel from 2009 to 2016.

Miller graduated from Iowa Valley High School in 1968.

== Head coaching record ==
=== College ===
Year	Team	Overall	Conference	Standing	Bowl/playoffs
Southwest Missouri State Bears (Gateway Football Conference) (1995–1998)
1995	Southwest Missouri State	4–7	1–5	7th	
1996	Southwest Missouri State	7–4	3–2	T–2nd	
1997	Southwest Missouri State	5–6	3–3	4th	
1998	Southwest Missouri State	5–6	3–3	T–3rd	
Southwest Missouri State:		21–23	10–13		
Total:		21–23			
