= 1998 Southwestern Louisiana Ragin' Cajuns football team =

American college football season

1998 Southwestern Louisiana Ragin' Cajuns football
- Conference: Independent
- Record: 2–9
- Head coach: Nelson Stokley (13th season)
- Offensive coordinator: Doug Fertsch (3rd season)
- Home stadium: Cajun Field

1998 NCAA Division I-A independents football records
	Conf.			Overall
Team	W		L	W		L
UCF		–		9	–	2
No. 22 Notre Dame		–		9	–	3
Louisiana Tech		–		6	–	6
Northeast Louisiana		–		5	–	6
UAB		–		4	–	7
Arkansas State		–		4	–	8
Navy		–		3	–	8
Southwestern Louisiana		–		2	–	9
Rankings from AP Poll

The 1998 Southwestern Louisiana Ragin' Cajuns football team was an American football team that represented the University of Southwestern Louisiana (now known as the University of Louisiana at Lafayette) as an independent during the 1998 NCAA Division I-A football season. In their 13th year under head coach Nelson Stokley, the Ragin' Cajuns compiled a 2–9 record.

== Schedule ==
Date	Opponent	Site	Result	Attendance	Source
September 5	at Arkansas	Razorback Stadium; Fayetteville, AR	L 17–38	47,562	
September 12	No. 14 (I-AA) Northwestern State	Cajun Field; Lafayette, LA	L 22–24		
September 19	at Louisiana Tech	Joe Aillet Stadium; Ruston, LA (rivalry)	L 14–77	16,460	
September 26	at Southern Miss	M. M. Roberts Stadium; Hattiesburg, MS	L 0–55	24,379	
October 3	at UAB	Legion Field; Birmingham, AL	L 13–24	14,217	
October 17	Arkansas State	Cajun Field; Lafayette, LA	W 21–19		
October 24	UCF	Cajun Field; Lafayette, LA	L 10–42	10,124	
October 31	at No. 19 Tulane	Louisiana Superdome; New Orleans, LA	L 20–72	25,177	
November 7	at Northeast Louisiana	Malone Stadium; Monroe, LA (rivalry)	L 24–34	12,647	
November 14	at Oklahoma State	Lewis Field; Stillwater, OK	L 20–44	37,245	
November 21	No. 13 (I-AA) Western Kentucky	Cajun Field; Lafayette, LA	W 38–24	5,224	
Rankings from AP Poll released prior to the game
