= 1998 UAB Blazers football team =

American college football season

1998 UAB Blazers football
- Conference: Independent
- Record: 4–7
- Head coach: Watson Brown (4th season)
- Offensive scheme: Multiple
- Defensive coordinator: Bill Clay (2nd season)
- Base defense: 4–3
- Home stadium: Legion Field; Hoover Metropolitan Stadium

1998 NCAA Division I-A independents football records
	Conf.			Overall
Team	W		L	W		L
UCF		–		9	–	2
No. 22 Notre Dame		–		9	–	3
Louisiana Tech		–		6	–	6
Northeast Louisiana		–		5	–	6
UAB		–		4	–	7
Arkansas State		–		4	–	8
Navy		–		3	–	8
Southwestern Louisiana		–		2	–	9
Rankings from AP Poll

The 1998 UAB Blazers football team represented the University of Alabama at Birmingham (UAB) as a independent during the 1998 NCAA Division I-A football season, and was the eighth team fielded by the school. Led by fourth-year head coach Watson Brown, the Blazers compiled a record of 4–7 in their third season at the NCAA Division I-A level. UAB played five home games at Legion Field in Birmingham, Alabama and one home game at the Hoover Metropolitan Stadium in Hoover, Alabama.

== Schedule ==
Date	Time	Opponent	Site	TV	Result	Attendance	Source
September 5	12:30 p.m.	at No. 3 Nebraska	Memorial Stadium; Lincoln, NE		L 7–38	75,921	
September 19	6:00 p.m.	Tennessee Tech	Legion Field; Birmingham, AL		W 38–6	18,500	
September 26	6:00 p.m.	Kansas	Legion Field; Birmingham, AL		L 37–39 ^{4OT}	30,543	
October 3	6:00 p.m.	Southwestern Louisiana	Legion Field; Birmingham, AL		W 24–13	14,217	
October 10	2:30 p.m.	at East Carolina	Dowdy–Ficklen Stadium; Greenville, NC	FSN	L 7–26	31,002	
October 17	6:00 p.m.	at Louisiana Tech	Joe Aillet Stadium; Ruston, LA		L 23–54	13,876	
October 24	6:00 p.m.	No. 21 Virginia Tech^{†}	Legion Field; Birmingham, AL		L 0–41	31,897	
October 31	7:00 p.m.	at Northeast Louisiana	Malone Stadium; Monroe, LA		L 14–20	11,886	
November 7	3:00 p.m.	at No. 2 Tennessee	Neyland Stadium; Knoxville, TN	PPV	L 13–37	106,508	
November 14	1:00 p.m.	Middle Tennessee State	Legion Field; Birmingham, AL		W 26–17	10,263	
November 21	1:00 p.m.	Tennessee–Martin	Hoover Metropolitan Stadium; Hoover, AL		W 48–17	3,571	
^{†}Homecoming; Rankings from AP Poll released prior to the game; All times are in Central time
