= 1998 Southwest Texas State Bobcats football team =

American college football season

1998 Southwest Texas State Bobcats football
- Conference: Southland Football League
- Record: 4–7 (2–5 Southland)
- Head coach: Bob DeBesse (2nd season)
- Offensive coordinator: Scott Bruning (2nd season)
- Defensive coordinator: David Bailiff (2nd season)
- Home stadium: Bobcat Stadium

1998 Southland Football League standings
	Conf.			Overall
Team	W		L	W		L
No. 3 Northwestern State $^	6	–	1	11	–	3
No. 8 McNeese State ^	5	–	2	9	–	3
No. 13 Troy State ^	5	–	2	8	–	4
Jacksonville State	4	–	3	7	–	4
Nicholls State	3	–	4	4	–	7
Southwest Texas State	2	–	5	4	–	7
Stephen F. Austin	2	–	5	3	–	8
Sam Houston State	1	–	6	3	–	8
$ – Conference champion; ^ – NCAA Division I-AA playoff participant; Rankings from The Sports Network poll

The 1998 Southwest Texas State Bobcats football team was an American football team that represented Southwest Texas State University (now known as Texas State University) during the 1998 NCAA Division I-AA football season as a member of the Southland Football League. In their second year under head coach Bob DeBesse, the team compiled an overall record of 4–7 with a mark of 2–5 in conference play.

== Schedule ==
Date	Opponent	Site	Result	Attendance	Source
September 3	Delta State*	Bobcat Stadium; San Marcos, TX	W 17–10	9,581	
September 12	at Northern Arizona*	Walkup Skydome; Flagstaff, AZ	L 16–38	9,471	
September 19	No. 7 Hofstra*	Bobcat Stadium; San Marcos, TX	L 3–17		
September 26	No. 8 Northwestern State	Bobcat Stadium; San Marcos, TX	L 10–34		
October 3	at Southern Illinois*	McAndrew Stadium; Carbondale, IL	W 30–25	8,500	
October 22	at No. 16 Troy State	Veterans Memorial Stadium; Troy, AL	L 17–20	16,780	
October 29	Stephen F. Austin	Bobcat Stadium; San Marcos, TX	W 14–7		
November 7	at No. 3 McNeese State	Cowboy Stadium; Lake Charles, LA	L 0–27		
November 14	Jacksonville State	Bobcat Stadium; San Marcos, TX	L 27–33	4,825	
November 21	at Sam Houston State	Bowers Stadium; Huntsville, TX (rivalry)	L 24–31		
November 28	Nicholls State	Bobcat Stadium; San Marcos, TX (rivalry)	W 28–27		
*Non-conference game; Rankings from The Sports Network Poll released prior to the game
