= 1998 Troy State Trojans football team =

American college football season

1998 Troy State Trojans football

Southland champion

NCAA Division I-AA First Round, L 17–27 at Florida A&M
- Conference: Southland Football League

Ranking
- Sports Network: No. 13
- Record: 8–4 (5–2 Southland)
- Head coach: Larry Blakeney (8th season)
- Offensive coordinator: Don Jacobs (8th season)
- Defensive coordinator: Wayne Bolt (2nd season)
- Base defense: 4–3
- Home stadium: Veterans Memorial Stadium

1998 Southland Football League standings
	Conf.			Overall
Team	W		L	W		L
No. 3 Northwestern State $^	6	–	1	11	–	3
No. 8 McNeese State ^	5	–	2	9	–	3
No. 13 Troy State ^	5	–	2	8	–	4
Jacksonville State	4	–	3	7	–	4
Nicholls State	3	–	4	4	–	7
Southwest Texas State	2	–	5	4	–	7
Stephen F. Austin	2	–	5	3	–	8
Sam Houston State	1	–	6	3	–	8
$ – Conference champion; ^ – NCAA Division I-AA playoff participant; Rankings from The Sports Network poll

The 1998 Troy State Trojans football team represented Troy State University—now known as Troy University—as a member of the Southland Football League during the 1998 NCAA Division I-AA football season. Led by eighth-year head coach Larry Blakeney, the Trojans compiled an overall record of 8–4 with a mark of 5–2 in conference play, tying of second place the Southland title. For the fifth time in six seasons, Troy State advanced to the NCAA Division I-AA Football Championship playoffs, where the Trojans lost to Florida A&M in the first round. The Trojans finished the season ranked No. 13 in the Sports Network poll. The team played home games at Veterans Memorial Stadium in Troy, Alabama.

== Schedule ==
Date	Opponent	Rank	Site	Result	Attendance	Source
September 5	Alabama State*	No. 25	Veterans Memorial Stadium; Troy, AL	W 26–0	18,845	
September 12	at Marshall*	No. 23	Marshall University Stadium; Huntington, WV	L 12–42	25,625	
September 19	at Chattanooga*	No. 25	Finley Stadium; Chattanooga, TN	W 23–6	7,618	
September 26	Samford*	No. 20	Veterans Memorial Stadium; Troy, AL	W 27–23	16,574	
October 3	at Sam Houston State	No. 19	Bowers Stadium; Huntsville, TX	W 17–14	6,014	
October 17	at Stephen F. Austin	No. 11	Homer Bryce Stadium; Nacogdoches, TX	L 14–21	12,421	
October 22	Southwest Texas State^{†}	No. 16	Veterans Memorial Stadium; Troy, AL	W 20–17	16,780	
October 31	at No. 4 Northwestern State	No. 15	Harry Turpin Stadium; Natchitoches, LA	W 14–13	10,362	
November 7	Nicholls State^{†}	No. 11	Veterans Memorial Stadium; Troy, AL	W 31–10	16,631	
November 14	No. 3 McNeese State	No. 9	Veterans Memorial Stadium; Troy, AL	L 3–23	16,125	
November 21	No. 24 Jacksonville State	No. 14	Paul Snow Stadium; Jacksonville, AL (rivalry)	W 31–7	14,987	
November 28	at No. 3 Florida A&M*	No. 11	Bragg Memorial Stadium; Tallahassee, FL (NCAA Division I-AA First Round)	L 17–27	16,509	
*Non-conference game; ^{†}Homecoming; Rankings from The Sports Network Poll released prior to the game
