= 1998 Sam Houston State Bearkats football team =

American college football season

1998 Sam Houston State Bearkats football
- Conference: Southland Conference
- Record: 3–8 (1–6 Southland)
- Head coach: Ron Randleman (17th season)
- Defensive coordinator: Mike Lucas (9th season)
- Home stadium: Bowers Stadium

1998 Southland Football League standings
	Conf.			Overall
Team	W		L	W		L
No. 3 Northwestern State $^	6	–	1	11	–	3
No. 8 McNeese State ^	5	–	2	9	–	3
No. 13 Troy State ^	5	–	2	8	–	4
Jacksonville State	4	–	3	7	–	4
Nicholls State	3	–	4	4	–	7
Southwest Texas State	2	–	5	4	–	7
Stephen F. Austin	2	–	5	3	–	8
Sam Houston State	1	–	6	3	–	8
$ – Conference champion; ^ – NCAA Division I-AA playoff participant; Rankings from The Sports Network poll

The 1998 Sam Houston State Bearkats football team represented Sam Houston State University as a member of the Southland Conference during the 1998 NCAA Division I-AA football season. Led by 17th-year head coach Ron Randleman, the Bearkats compiled an overall record of 3–8 with a mark of 1–6 in conference play, and finished eighth in the Southland.

== Schedule ==
Date	Opponent	Site	Result	Attendance	Source
September 5	at Angelo State*	San Angelo Stadium; San Angelo, TX	W 27–26	6,850	
September 12	Chadron State*	Bowers Stadium; Huntsville, TX	W 17–6	7,221	
September 19	Texas A&M–Kingsville*	Bowers Stadium; Huntsville, TX	L 10–16	10,221	
September 26	at Utah State*	Romney Stadium; Logan, UT	L 17-47	14,498	
October 3	No. 19 Troy State	Bowers Stadium; Huntsville, TX	L 14–17	6,014	
October 8	at Nicholls State	John L. Guidry Stadium; Thibodaux, LA	L 33–36	3,188	
October 24	at Jacksonville State	Paul Snow Stadium; Jacksonville, AL	L 19–31	5,237	
October 31	No. 5 McNeese State	Bowers Stadium; Huntsville, TX	L 13–35		
November 7	at Stephen F. Austin	Homer Bryce Stadium; Nacogdoches, TX (Battle of the Piney Woods)	L 7–38		
November 14	at No. 7 Northwestern State	Harry Turpin Stadium; Natchitoches, LA	L 3–59	5,117	
November 21	Southwest Texas State	Bowers Stadium; Huntsville, TX (rivalry)	W 31–24		
*Non-conference game; Rankings from The Sports Network Poll released prior to the game
