= 1998 Stephen F. Austin Lumberjacks football team =

American college football season

1998 Stephen F. Austin Lumberjacks football
- Conference: Southland Conference
- Record: 3–8 (2–5 SLC)
- Head coach: John Pearce (7th season)
- Home stadium: Homer Bryce Stadium

1998 Southland Football League standings
	Conf.			Overall
Team	W		L	W		L
No. 3 Northwestern State $^	6	–	1	11	–	3
No. 8 McNeese State ^	5	–	2	9	–	3
No. 13 Troy State ^	5	–	2	8	–	4
Jacksonville State	4	–	3	7	–	4
Nicholls State	3	–	4	4	–	7
Southwest Texas State	2	–	5	4	–	7
Stephen F. Austin	2	–	5	3	–	8
Sam Houston State	1	–	6	3	–	8
$ – Conference champion; ^ – NCAA Division I-AA playoff participant; Rankings from The Sports Network poll

The 1998 Stephen F. Austin Lumberjacks football team was an American football team that represented Stephen F. Austin State University as a member of the Southland Conference during the 1998 NCAA Division I-AA football season. In their seventh year under head coach John Pearce, the team compiled an overall record of 3–8, with a mark of 2–5 in conference play, and finished tied for sixth in the Southland.

== Schedule ==
Date	Opponent	Rank	Site	Result	Attendance	Source
September 5	No. 3 Montana*		Homer Bryce Stadium; Nacogdoches, TX	L 42–49		
September 12	Tarleton State*		Homer Bryce Stadium; Nacogdoches, TX	W 28–3	6,314	
September 19	at Northeast Louisiana*	No. 24	Malone Stadium; Monroe, LA	L 10–21	13,908	
September 26	No. 17 Northern Iowa*		Homer Bryce Stadium; Nacogdoches, TX	L 10–14	10,939	
October 1	at Jacksonville State		Paul Snow Stadium; Jacksonville, AL	L 16–22	13,027	
October 17	No. 11 Troy State		Homer Bryce Stadium; Nacogdoches, TX	W 21–14	12,421	
October 24	at No. 5 McNeese State		Cowboy Stadium; Lake Charles, LA	L 17–20	17,500	
October 29	at Southwest Texas State		Bobcat Stadium; San Marcos, TX	L 7–14	6,295	
November 7	Sam Houston State		Homer Bryce Stadium; Nacogdoches, TX (rivalry)	W 38–7		
November 14	at Nicholls State		John L. Guidry Stadium; Thibodaux, LA	L 7–14	1,847	
November 21	No. 5 Northwestern State		Homer Bryce Stadium; Nacogdoches, TX (rivalry)	L 21–35	6,221	
*Non-conference game; Rankings from The Sports Network Poll released prior to the game
