= 1998 Nicholls State Colonels football team =

American college football season

1998 Nicholls State Colonels football
- Conference: Southland Football League
- Record: 4–7 (3–4 Southland)
- Head coach: Darren Barbier (4th season)
- Defensive coordinator: Manny Michel (4th season)
- Home stadium: John L. Guidry Stadium

1998 Southland Football League standings
	Conf.			Overall
Team	W		L	W		L
No. 3 Northwestern State $^	6	–	1	11	–	3
No. 8 McNeese State ^	5	–	2	9	–	3
No. 13 Troy State ^	5	–	2	8	–	4
Jacksonville State	4	–	3	7	–	4
Nicholls State	3	–	4	4	–	7
Southwest Texas State	2	–	5	4	–	7
Stephen F. Austin	2	–	5	3	–	8
Sam Houston State	1	–	6	3	–	8
$ – Conference champion; ^ – NCAA Division I-AA playoff participant; Rankings from The Sports Network poll

The 1998 Nicholls State Colonels football team represented Nicholls State University as a member of the Southland Football League during the 1998 NCAA Division I-AA football season. Led by Darren Barbier in his fourth and final season as head coach, the Colonels compiled an overall record of 4–7 with a mark of 3–4 in conference play, placing fifth in the Southland. Nicholls State played home games at John L. Guidry Stadium in Thibodaux, Louisiana.

== Schedule ==
Date	Opponent	Site	Result	Attendance	Source
September 5	at Northeast Louisiana*	Malone Stadium; Monroe, LA	L 10–44		
September 12	vs. Mississippi Valley State*	Tad Gormley Stadium; New Orleans, LA (Gormley Gridiron Classic)	W 41–26		
September 26	Jacksonville State	John L. Guidry Stadium; Thibodaux, LA	L 20–21	2,418	
October 3	at Samford*	Seibert Stadium; Homewood, AL	L 16–17	4,541	
October 8	Sam Houston State	John L. Guidry Stadium; Thibodaux, LA	W 36–33	3,188	
October 24	No. 4 Northwestern State	John L. Guidry Stadium; Thibodaux, LA (rivalry)	L 26–28		
October 31	at Louisiana Tech*	Joe Aillet Stadium; Ruston, TX	L 28–56	12,204	
November 7	at No. 11 Troy State	Veterans Memorial Stadium; Troy, AL	L 10–31	16,631	
November 14	Stephen F. Austin	John L. Guidry Stadium; Thibodaux, LA	W 14–7		
November 21	at No. 2 McNeese State	Cowboy Stadium; Lake Charles, LA	W 31–20		
November 28	at Southwest Texas State	Bobcat Stadium; San Marcos, TX (rivalry)	L 27–28		
*Non-conference game; Rankings from The Sports Network Poll released prior to the game
