= 1998 Arkansas State Indians football team =

American college football season

1998 Arkansas State Indians football
- Conference: Independent
- Record: 4–8
- Head coach: Joe Hollis (2nd season)
- Offensive coordinator: Randy Fichtner (1st season)
- Defensive coordinator: Keith Butler (1st season)
- Home stadium: Indian Stadium

1998 NCAA Division I-A independents football records
| | Conf. | | | Overall |
| Team | W | | L | W | | L |
|---|---|---|---|---|---|---|
| UCF | | – | | 9 | – | 2 |
| No. 22 Notre Dame | | – | | 9 | – | 3 |
| Louisiana Tech | | – | | 6 | – | 6 |
| Northeast Louisiana | | – | | 5 | – | 6 |
| UAB | | – | | 4 | – | 7 |
| Arkansas State | | – | | 4 | – | 8 |
| Navy | | – | | 3 | – | 8 |
| Southwestern Louisiana | | – | | 2 | – | 9 |
Rankings from AP Poll

The 1998 Arkansas State Indians football team represented Arkansas State University as an independent during the 1998 NCAA Division I-A football season. Led by second-year head coach Joe Hollis, the Indians compiled a record of 4–8. The Indians played and won their first overtime game in school history against New Mexico State.

== Schedule ==
| Date | Opponent | Site | Result | Attendance | Source |
|---|---|---|---|---|---|
| September 5 | at Minnesota | Hubert H. Humphrey Metrodome; Minneapolis, MN | L 14–17 | 40,112 | |
| September 12 | at No. 7 LSU | Tiger Stadium; Baton Rouge, LA | L 6–42 | 80,051 | |
| September 19 | Southwest Missouri State | Indian Stadium; Jonesboro, AR | W 28–24 | | |
| September 26 | at Hawaii | Aloha Stadium; Halawa, HI | W 20–0 | 28,159 | |
| October 3 | New Mexico State^{†} | Indian Stadium; Jonesboro, AR | W 34–31 ^{OT} | | |
| October 10 | Idaho | Indian Stadium; Jonesboro, AR | L 14–52 | 12,674 | |
| October 17 | at Southwestern Louisiana | Cajun Field; Lafayette, LA | L 19–21 | | |
| October 24 | at Ole Miss | Vaught–Hemingway Stadium; Oxford, MS | L 17–30 | 38,116 | |
| October 31 | at Memphis | Liberty Bowl Memorial Stadium; Memphis, TN (Paint Bucket Bowl) | L 19–35 | 18,142 | |
| November 7 | Louisiana Tech | Indian Stadium; Jonesboro, AR | L 21–69 | 8,316 | |
| November 14 | Northeast Louisiana | Indian Stadium; Jonesboro, AR | W 17–13 | 5,192 | |
| November 21 | Cincinnati | Indian Stadium; Jonesboro, AR | L 7–51 | | |
^{†}Homecoming; Rankings from AP Poll released prior to the game
