= 1998 Louisiana Tech Bulldogs football team =

American college football season

1998 Louisiana Tech Bulldogs football
- Conference: Independent
- Record: 6–6
- Head coach: Gary Crowton (3rd season)
- Captain: None
- Home stadium: Joe Aillet Stadium

1998 NCAA Division I-A independents football records
	Conf.			Overall
Team	W		L	W		L
UCF		–		9	–	2
No. 22 Notre Dame		–		9	–	3
Louisiana Tech		–		6	–	6
Northeast Louisiana		–		5	–	6
UAB		–		4	–	7
Arkansas State		–		4	–	8
Navy		–		3	–	8
Southwestern Louisiana		–		2	–	9
Rankings from AP Poll

The 1998 Louisiana Tech Bulldogs football team was an American football team that represented Louisiana Tech University as an independent during the 1998 NCAA Division I-A football season. In their third year under head coach Gary Crowton, the team compiled an 6–6 record. However, Louisiana Tech was retroactively awarded a forfeit win over Texas A&M because one of the Aggies was ineligible.

== Schedule ==
Date	Opponent	Site	Result	Attendance	Source
August 29	at No. 4 Nebraska	Memorial Stadium; Lincoln, NE (Eddie Robinson Classic)	L 27–56	76,021	
September 5	UCF	Joe Aillet Stadium; Ruston, LA	L 30–64	23,575	
September 12	at No. 18 Texas A&M	Kyle Field; College Station, TX	L 7–28	55,073	
September 19	Southwestern Louisiana	Joe Aillet Stadium; Ruston, LA (rivalry)	W 77–14	16,460	
September 26	at Wyoming	War Memorial Stadium; Laramie, WY	L 19–31	14,924	
October 3	Boise State	Joe Aillet Stadium; Ruston, LA	W 63–28	17,623	
October 10	at Northeast Louisiana	Malone Stadium; Monroe, LA (rivalry)	W 44–14	28,725	
October 17	UAB	Joe Aillet Stadium; Ruston, LA	W 54–23	13,876	
October 24	at Auburn	Jordan–Hare Stadium; Auburn, AL	L 17–32	74,823	
October 31	Nicholls State	Joe Aillet Stadium; Ruston, LA	W 56–28	12,204	
November 7	at Arkansas State	Indian Stadium; Jonesboro, AR	W 69–21	8,316	
November 26	at No. 11 Tulane	Louisiana Superdome; New Orleans, LA	L 30–63	37,391	
Rankings from AP Poll released prior to the game
