= 1998 Navy Midshipmen football team =

American college football season

1998 Navy Midshipmen football
- Conference: Independent
- Record: 3–8
- Head coach: Charlie Weatherbie (4th season)
- Offensive coordinator: Ken Niumatalolo (2nd season)
- Offensive scheme: Triple option
- Defensive coordinator: Dick Bumpas (4th season)
- Base defense: 4–2–5
- MVP: Jason Snider
- Captains: Jason Wolf; Jason Snider
- Home stadium: Navy–Marine Corps Memorial Stadium

1998 NCAA Division I-A independents football records
| | Conf. | | | Overall |
| Team | W | | L | W | | L |
|---|---|---|---|---|---|---|
| UCF | | – | | 9 | – | 2 |
| No. 22 Notre Dame | | – | | 9 | – | 3 |
| Louisiana Tech | | – | | 6 | – | 6 |
| Northeast Louisiana | | – | | 5 | – | 6 |
| UAB | | – | | 4 | – | 7 |
| Arkansas State | | – | | 4 | – | 8 |
| Navy | | – | | 3 | – | 8 |
| Southwestern Louisiana | | – | | 2 | – | 9 |
Rankings from AP Poll

The 1998 Navy Midshipmen football team represented the United States Naval Academy (USNA) as an independent during the 1998 NCAA Division I-A football season. The team was led by fourth-year head coach Charlie Weatherbie.

== Schedule ==
| Date | Time | Opponent | Site | TV | Result | Attendance | Source |
|---|---|---|---|---|---|---|---|
| September 10 | 8:00 p.m. | at Wake Forest | Groves Stadium; Winston-Salem, NC | ESPN | L 14–26 | 26,032 | |
| September 19 | | Kent State | Navy–Marine Corps Memorial Stadium; Annapolis, MD | | W 38–24 | | |
| September 26 | | at Tulane | Louisiana Superdome; New Orleans, LA | | L 24–42 | 19,371 | |
| October 3 | 12:00 p.m. | West Virginia | Navy–Marine Corps Memorial Stadium; Annapolis, MD | FSN | L 24–45 | 36,009 | |
| October 10 | | at Air Force | Falcon Stadium; Colorado Springs, CO (Commander-in-Chief's Trophy) | | L 7–49 | 54,652 | |
| October 17 | | Colgate^{†} | Navy–Marine Corps Memorial Stadium; Annapolis, MD | | W 42–35 | 28,504 | |
| October 24 | 12:00 p.m. | at Boston College | Alumni Stadium; Chestnut Hill, MA | ESPN+ | W 32–31 | 42,877 | |
| November 7 | | Rutgers | Navy–Marine Corps Memorial Stadium; Annapolis, MD | | L 33–36 | | |
| November 14 | | vs. Notre Dame | Jack Kent Cooke Stadium; Landover, MD (rivalry) | CBS | L 0–30 | 78,844 | |
| November 21 | 12:00 p.m. | SMU | Navy–Marine Corps Memorial Stadium; Annapolis, MD (rivalry) | | L 11–24 | 27,487 | |
| December 5 | | vs. Army | Veterans Stadium; Philadelphia, PA (Army–Navy Game) | | L 30–34 | | |
^{†}Homecoming

== Roster ==
1998 Navy Midshipmen football team roster
Players
Coaches
Offense

| Pos. | # | Name | Class |
|---|---|---|---|
| QB | | Brian Broadwater | So |
| RB | 35 | Irv Dingle |

Defense

| Pos. | # | Name | Class |

Special teams

| Pos. | # | Name | Class |

Head coach

- Charlie Weatherbie

Coordinators/assistant coaches

Legend

- (C) Team captain
- (S) Suspended
- (I) Ineligible
- Injured
- Redshirt
