= 1998 Illinois State Redbirds football team =

American college football season

1998 Illinois State Redbirds football

NCAA Division I-AA First Round, L 28–48 vs. Northwestern State
- Conference: Gateway Football Conference

Ranking
- Sports Network: No. 16
- Record: 8–4 (4–2 Gateway)
- Head coach: Todd Berry (3rd season)
- Offensive coordinator: John Bond (3rd season)
- Offensive scheme: Spread
- Defensive coordinator: Dennis Therrell (3rd season)
- Base defense: 4–4
- MVPs: Kevin Glenn; Galen Scott
- Captains: Steve Farmer; Kevin Glenn; Jacob Niete; Chad Pegues
- Home stadium: Hancock Stadium

1998 Gateway Football Conference standings
	Conf.			Overall
Team	W		L	W		L
No. 4 Western Illinois $^	5	–	1	11	–	3
No. 16 Illinois State ^	4	–	2	8	–	4
Northern Iowa	3	–	3	7	–	4
Youngstown State	3	–	3	6	–	5
Southwest Missouri State	3	–	3	5	–	6
Indiana State	2	–	4	5	–	6
Southern Illinois	1	–	5	3	–	8
$ – Conference champion; ^ – NCAA Division I-AA playoff participant; Rankings from The Sports Network poll

The 1998 Illinois State Redbirds football team represented Illinois State University as a member of the Gateway Football Conference during the 1998 NCAA Division I-AA football season. Led by third-year head coach Todd Berry, the Redbirds compiled an overall record of 8–4 with a mark of 4–2 in conference play, placing second in the Gateway. Illinois State received an at-large bid to the NCAA Division I-AA Football Championship playoffs, losing to Northwestern State in the first round. Illinois State was ranked No. 16 in The Sports Network's postseason ranking of NCAA Division I-AA teams. The team played home games at Hancock Stadium in Normal, Illinois.

== Schedule ==
Date	Time	Opponent	Rank	Site	Result	Attendance	Source
September 12	6:30 pm	St. Francis (IL)*		Hancock Stadium; Normal, IL	W 47–3	7,951	
September 19	7:00 pm	at Kansas*		Memorial Stadium; Lawrence, KS	L 21–63	31,100	
September 26	3:30 pm	Southern Illinois^{†}		Hancock Stadium; Normal, IL	W 41–38 ^{OT}	9,611	
October 3	2:00 pm	at Indiana State		Memorial Stadium; Terre Haute, IN	W 24–20	5,174	
October 10	6:30 pm	at Northern Iowa		UNI-Dome; Cedar Falls, IA	W 38–23	8,369	
October 17	1:30 pm	at No. 14 Eastern Illinois*		O'Brien Field; Charleston, IL (Mid-America Classic)	W 36–22	9,064	
October 24	1:30 pm	at No. 3 Western Illinois	No. 18	Hanson Field; Macomb, IL	L 10–37	16,741	
October 31	1:30 pm	Southern Utah*	No. 24	Hancock Stadium; Normal, IL	W 42–14	10,238	
November 7	1:30 pm	Southwest Missouri State	No. 21	Hancock Stadium; Normal, IL	L 42–49	5,297	
November 14	1:30 pm	Youngstown State		Hancock Stadium; Normal, IL	W 48–14	5,962	
November 21	1:30 pm	Kentucky State*		Hancock Stadium; Normal, IL	W 48–10	4,637	
November 28		at No. 2 Northwestern State*	No. 21	Harry Turpin Stadium; Natchitoches, LA (NCAA Division I-AA First Round)	L 28–48	8,118	
*Non-conference game; ^{†}Homecoming; Rankings from The Sports Network Poll released prior to the game; All times are in Central time
