= Malcolm Johnson (wide receiver) =

American football player (born 1977)

No. 83, 82, 80
- Position: Wide receiver

Personal information
- Born: August 27, 1977 (age 49); Washington, D.C., U.S.
- Listed height: 6 ft 5 in (1.96 m)
- Listed weight: 215 lb (98 kg)

Career information
- High school: Gonzaga College (Washington, D.C.)
- College: Notre Dame (1994–1998)
- NFL draft: 1999: 5th round, 166th overall pick

Career history
- Pittsburgh Steelers (1999–2000); New York Jets (2000); Cincinnati Bengals (2001)*; Ottawa Renegades (2002)
- * Offseason or practice squad member only
- Stats at Pro Football Reference

Malcolm Alexander Johnson (born August 27, 1977) is an American former professional football wide receiver who played two seasons in the National Football League (NFL) with the Pittsburgh Steelers and New York Jets. He was selected by the Steelers in the fifth round of the 1999 NFL draft after playing college football at the University of Notre Dame. He also played for the Ottawa Renegades of the Canadian Football League (CFL).

== Early life ==
Malcolm Alexander Johnson was born on August 27, 1977, in Washington, D.C. He attended Gonzaga College High School in Washington D.C.

== College career ==
Johnson played college football for the Notre Dame Fighting Irish from 1995 to 1998. He was redshirted in 1994. He caught 25 passes for 449 yards and two touchdowns in 1996, 42 passes for 596 and two touchdowns in 1997, and 43 catches for 692 yards and six touchdowns in 1998.

== Professional career ==
Johnson was selected by the Pittsburgh Steelers in the fifth round, with the 166th overall pick, of the 1999 NFL draft. He officially signed with the team on July 12. He played in six games for the Steelers during his rookie year in 1999, catching two passes for 23 yards on nine targets. He appeared in four games for the Steelers during the 2000 season and was targeted eight times but did not record a reception. He was waived on November 20, 2000.

Johnson was claimed off waivers by the New York Jets on November 21, 2000. He played in one game before being waived on December 5. He was signed to the team's practice squad two days later. He signed a futures contract with the Jets on December 26, 2000. He was waived on June 1, 2001.

Johnson was claimed off waivers by the Cincinnati Bengals on June 11, 2001. He was waived on September 2, 2001, and signed to the team's practice squad the next day. He was waived by the Bengals on December 27, 2001.

Johnson played in five games for the Ottawa Renegades of the Canadian Football League in 2002, recording 16 receptions for 185 yards and five tackles.

== Post-football career ==
After his football career, he graduated from Carnegie Mellon University with an MBA and became a banker.
