= Davin Bush =

American gridiron football player (born 1977)

No. 2
- Position: Defensive back

Personal information
- Born: October 5, 1977 (age 49); Miami, Florida, U.S.
- Listed height: 5 ft 8 in (1.73 m)
- Listed weight: 165 lb (75 kg)

Career information
- College: UCF

Career history
- 2001–2006: Saskatchewan Roughriders
- 2007: Winnipeg Blue Bombers
- Stats at CFL.ca (archive)

Davin Bush (born October 5, 1977) is an American former professional football defensive halfback who played in the Canadian Football League.

Bush was signed as a free agent by the Winnipeg Blue Bombers in 2007 after playing with the Saskatchewan Roughriders from 2001 to 2006. He was released by the Blue Bombers on January 30, 2008. He attended college at the University of Central Florida. His brother Devin Bush is a former safety in the National Football League.
